= Moby Dick (1954 film) =

1954 live television adaptation by George Schaefer

- Based on: Moby Dick by Herman Melville
- Written by: Howard Rodman
- Directed by: Albert McCleery
- Starring: Victor Jory; Lamont Johnson
- Country of origin: United States
- Original language: English

Production
- Producer: Albert McCleery
- Running time: 60 minutes
- Production company: Hallmark Hall of Fame Productions

Original release
- Network: NBC
- Release: May 16, 1954

Moby Dick is a live television adaptation of the like-named novel by Herman Melville, presented as the May 16, 1954 episode of the American anthology series Hallmark Hall of Fame. Written by Howard Rodman, directed by Albert McCleery, and starring Victor Jory, Hugh O'Brian, and actor-director Lamont Johnson,, this episode is now considered "lost".

== Cast ==
- Sarah Churchill as self (host)
- Victor Jory as Captain Ahab
- Lamont Johnson as Ishmael
- Harvey Stephens as Stubb
- Hugh O'Brian as Starbuck
- Steve Darrell as Tashtego
- Tim Graham as Carpenter
- John Hamilton as 'Jeroboam' Captain
- Thomas Browne Henry as Fedallah (as Thomas B. Henry)
- John Larch as 1st Sailor
- Earl Lee as Elijah
- James Logan as Captain of the Rachael
- Charles Mauu as Queequeg
- Howard McNeely as Pip
- Nestor Paiva as Capt. Peleg

== Production ==
A few days before the broadcast, McCleery informed INS reporter Emily Belser that, with his contrastingly intimate and whale-less production, he was bringing this episode in for an estimated twenty thousand dollars, which he contrasted to the projected $3,000,000 to be spent on the upcoming John Huston, Ray Bradbury big screen version. (Note: By November 1954, the latter film's projected cost had reportedly risen by at least another million.)

== Reception ==
Variety commended Hallmark for "d[oing] a remarkably fine job of telescoping Herman Melville's classic, Moby Dick, into a fluid dramatic hour of television.

Producer-director Albert McCleery and adapter Ho ward Rodman accomplished two difficult things on the show: (1)they lent plenty of action to the story, though largely confined to one set, and (2) developed the character and motivation of Captain Ahab sharply and strongly. Much of the credit for the former must go to Victor Jory, who turned in a notable performance as the Captain. [...] Supporting cast was equally good, notably Hugh O'Brien as Starbuck, Lamont Johnson as Ishmael, and Thomas B. Henry as Fedallah. Staging was ingenious. Most of the action was centered on the main deck, a convincing replica of a whaling boat deck, with supplementary sets in the crew's quarters and on a small boat. McCleery got a sense of action and drive into the teleplay all within those confines, all the more remarkable because the original novel itself is of the plodding variety. Everything about this production–script, acting, sets, lighting–was topnotch, and McCleery and his NBC Hollywood staff can take a long, self-congratulatory bow.
