= Moby Dick (2010 film) =

2010 film by Trey Stokes

- DVD cover
- Directed by: Trey Stokes
- Screenplay by: Paul Bales
- Based on: Moby-Dick by Herman Melville
- Produced by: David Michael Latt; David Rimawi; Paul Bales
- Starring: Barry Bostwick; Renee O'Connor; Michael B. Teh; Adam Grimes
- Cinematography: Alexander Yellen
- Edited by: Alex Evans
- Music by: Chris Ridenhour
- Distributed by: The Asylum
- Release date: November 23, 2010
- Running time: 87 minutes
- Country: United States
- Language: English
- Budget: $500,000

Moby Dick (alternatively titled 2010: Moby Dick or Moby Dick: 2010) is a 2010 American thriller film that is an adaptation of Herman Melville's 1851 novel Moby-Dick. The film is an Asylum production, and stars Barry Bostwick as Captain Ahab. It also stars Renee O'Connor, Michael B. Teh, and Adam Grimes and is directed by Trey Stokes.

== Plot ==
On November 20, 1969, 50 miles off Soviet waters, the USS Acushnet dives under the ice. A young Ahab listens to sonar for enemy submarines when suddenly he detects an unknown target. When the captain listens, he hears nothing, but Ahab insists on a presence in the emptiness. The target dives into a trench, but the captain abandons his search in favor of photographing the target. The target attacks the submarine and brings the vessel up to the icy surface, revealing to be an enormous white whale. Ahab survives, but loses his left leg to the beast when it hauls the other half of the submarine back underwater.

In the present day, Dr. Michelle Herman (O'Connor) and her assistant Pip (Derrick Scott) test a whale-song generator when the USS Pequod surfaces behind them and Lieutenant Commander Starbuck (Grimes), the executive officer, persuades them to come aboard. In the submarine, Starbuck tells them about several attacks in which eyewitnesses all report seeing an enormous whale, recorded to be about 500 ft (150 m) in length. Michelle theorizes that it could be a surviving species from prehistoric times, as the largest recorded size for a Sperm Whale is far too small. After she explains that the whale-song generator needs a recorded whale's vocalization, Captain Ahab (Bostwick) comes to the deck and gives her the recording he took of the creature back in 1969, identifying the creature to be Moby Dick, a legendary sea creature of evil and immortality. Although Michelle disagrees on joining a Navy submarine with the intent of killing an animal, she has no choice and Ahab claims to want to stop the attacks.

In San Diego, Captain Boomer (another survivor of the attack of '69) is told by his superiors of suspicious activity revolving around the Pequod. He is assigned to investigate, and thanks to a survivor from a recent attack by the White Whale, he comes to the conclusion that Ahab is on the hunt for Moby Dick.

Meanwhile, the USS Essex is searching for the Pequod off Hawaii. When they go to active sonar, it attracts the attention of the wandering Moby Dick. The Essex engages what appears to be the submarine they were searching for, but realizes too late that their adversary is biological just before the submarine is destroyed by a torpedo it shot. Later the Pequod comes to their location with no sign of the whale, but encounter the corpses of the Essex's crew. Rousing his crew with a speech, Ahab moves on to search for the beast.

A helicopter in search of the Pequod encounters it while the submarine is following a 500-foot target. As the helicopter engages them, the submarine fires a nuke at the unknown target, but the confused helicopter crew tell them they shot a school of giant squid just before they are swallowed alive by Moby Dick.

The whale then attacks the S.S. Rachel, a cruise liner, when the Pequod intervenes with Michelle's whale-song generator. This, however, causes the whale to attack them, subsequently destroying a fin on the Pequod. The submarine fires a harpoon made from the Acushnet's hull on top of Moby Dick's eye, which forces him to dive deeper, dragging the Pequod with it. As the water pressure begins to damage the hull, the line snaps and Starbuck forces the ship to surface.

Moby Dick surfaces too, and the Pequod, along with the help of Boomer in a helicopter, forces the whale into an atoll. The submarine gets trapped in shallow water, and three boats are sent out to face the whale with guns and Ahab's harpoon. Moby Dick destroys two of the boats and forces the survivors onto the island's shores. The whale attacks them again, resulting in the death of Queequeg (Michael Teh). Ahab takes the last boat and fires his harpoon at the whale's other eye. Moby Dick destroys the boat, killing Ahab. The remaining crew of the Pequod, including Starbuck, and Pip, follow Ahab's orders and fire nukes at the island. Moby Dick dodges the nukes and crushes the Pequod just as the island explodes. The White Whale survives possibly to wreak havoc another day; Michelle swims to the surface just as a rescue helicopter arrives.

== Cast ==
- Barry Bostwick as Captain Jonah Ahab
- Renee O'Connor as Dr. Michelle Herman
- Jay Gillespie as Young Jonah Ahab
- Michael B. Teh as Queequeg
- Adam Grimes as Starbuck
- Cindi Arrata as Lieutenant Vanessa
- Carlos Antonio as Captain Macey
- Matt Lagan as Captain John "Boomer" Enderby
- Jay Beyers as Young John "Boomer" Enderby
- Dean Kreyling as Admiral De Deer
- Carlos Javier Castillo as Cabaco
- Oliver Rayon as Bulkington
- Durant Fowler as Doughby
- Michael Gaglio as XO / Millard Davis
- Bart Baggett as Lieutenant Flask
- Derrick Scott as Pip
- Carl Watts as Captain Pollard
- Kevin Sumethasorn as Archy
- Kevin Allen as Pilot
- Jett Turner as Essex Sonar
- Jeff Jones as Seaman #1

== Production ==
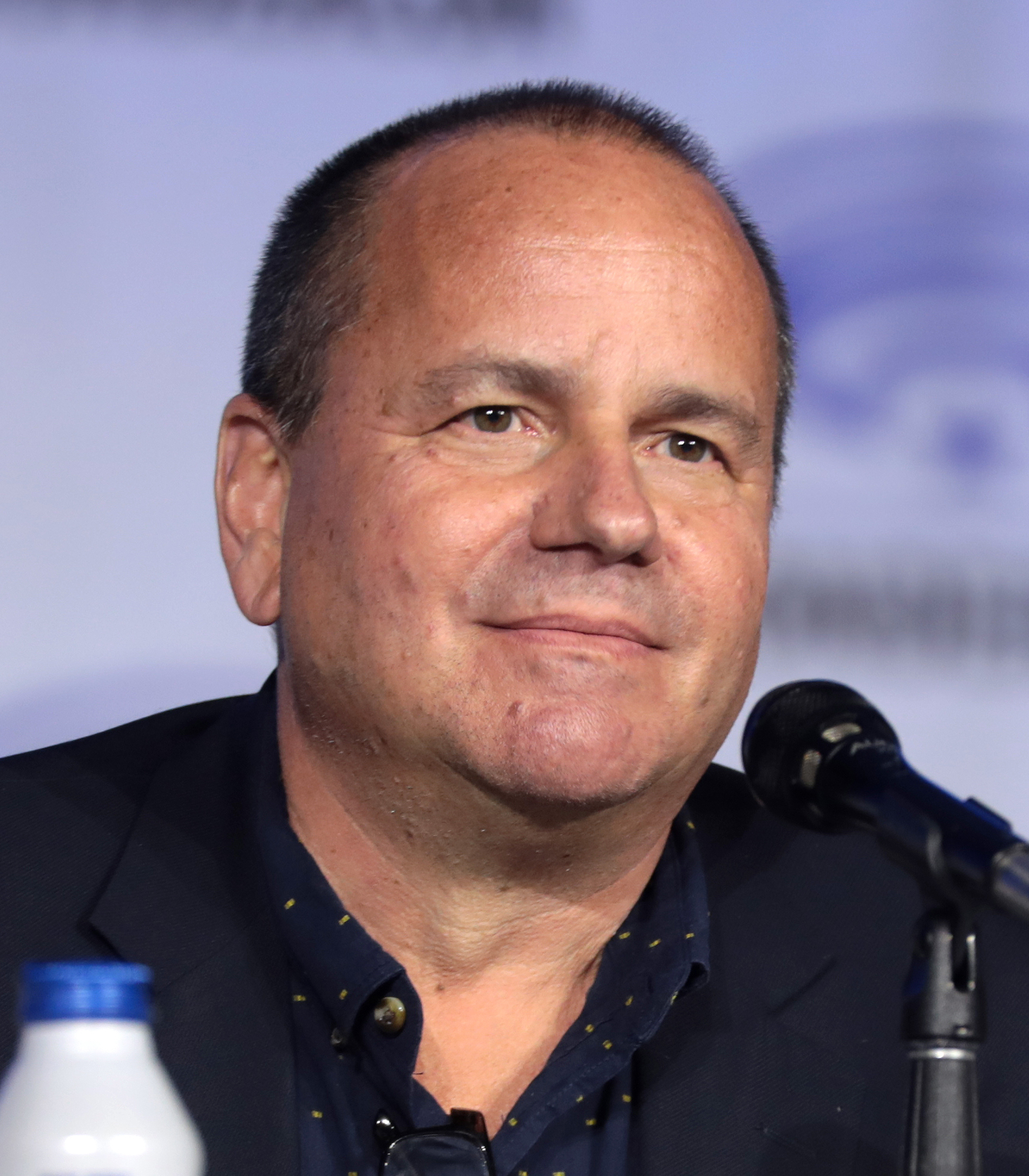
Writer Paul Bales

The film's script was written by Paul Bales, who was tasked with updating the story so that it would take place in 1975. The decision was also made to give the titular whale abilities that Melville's whale did not, such as the capability to travel on land. In an interview with Media Mikes, Bostwick described the production as "one of those ten day jobs where I did it just to see if I could do it" and that he created the harpoon gun used in the end of the film after being handed a spear gun purchased at a yard sale. Of this choice, Bostwick stated that "I didn’t want to be embarrassed by the fact that they only had a dollar and a quarter, you know, to make that movie. I still have that gun mounted in my workshop. I felt the gun had to be something reflective of the character...much larger than life."

== Release ==
2010: Moby Dick was released direct to video in the United States on November 23, 2010.

== Reception ==
Dread Central rated the film at 2 1/2 out of 5, criticizing the choice to add 2010 into the film's title and stating that some viewers could find some "schlock value" but warned that they may "mash the fast forward button between the first and last fifteen minutes". Kevin Carr of 7M Pictures was more favorable, as they felt that it was "silly and it's fun, and it actually plays better than most of the Asylum knock-offs." Paul Constant of The Stranger also wrote a favorable review, noting that "It's perfect distracted holiday viewing. Watch it while you're drunkenly wrapping presents."

In an article for the Journal of Film and Video David Dowling wrote that "The crass spectacle the film makes of the whale’s animality and agency is not uniformly sophomoric, however. One scene in particular, shot with tongue in cheek, is simultaneously self-referential and critical, calling attention to its own place within the trappings of a campy third-rate action monster movie, while also mocking the well-meaning piety of whale watchers as embodying yet another equally blind androcentric understanding of the whale."
