= Pip (Moby-Dick character) =

Fictional character from the novel Moby-Dick

- Moby Dick character
- Created by: Herman Melville

In-universe information
- Gender: Male
- Occupation: Cabin boy
- Nationality: American

Pip, short for Pippin, is the African-American cabin-boy on the whaling-ship Pequod in Herman Melville's 1851 novel, Moby-Dick. When Pip falls overboard he is left stranded in the sea, and rescued only by chance and becomes "mad". The book's narrator, Ishmael, however, thinks that this "madness" gives Pip the power to see the world as it is. Pip is first described as "insignificant", but is the only member of the crew to awaken feelings of humanity in Ahab, the ship's monomaniacal captain.

Critics say that Pip shows Melville's use of irony and contradiction to explore race relations and human rights in the 19th-century United States.

Pip Cliffs is a site in the Antarctic Peninsula, one of a group named after characters in Moby-Dick.

== Role in the plot ==
Pip may have been inspired by John Backus, a member of the Acushnet, Melville's first whaling ship. Melville listed the members of that crew, describing Backus as a "little black", and another member of that crew wrote that he saw Backus leap from a boat led by a crew member he identified with Stubb and become fouled in the harpoon line.

Although he had been hired as a cabin-boy, Pip is forced to replace an injured crew member in Second Mate Stubb's boat on its hunt. Pip panics and leaps into the water but is tangled in the harpoon line. Stubb grudgingly orders the line to be cut, letting the whale free. Stubb warns Pip: “We can’t afford to lose whale by the likes of you.... a whale would sell for thirty times what you would Pip, in Alabama,” a reference to the price at a slave market. A few days later, Pip once again leaps in panic, Stubb does not stop the boat, and this time only by chance does the Pequod itself come across him. Pip then wanders the decks as what Ishmael calls "an idiot". The traumatized Pip can only repeat the language of an advertisement for the return of a fugitive slave: "Pip! Reward for Pip!" Ishmael adds that Pip saw "God’s foot upon the treadle of the loom, and spoke it; and therefore his shipmates called him mad." "So man's insanity is heaven's sense." Ishmael notes that Pip's disaster foreshadows what will happen to the Pequod. This chapter centers on Pip's isolation, and is followed by chapters that center on fellowship and shared experience.

In chapter 125, when Ahab calls upon him to help mend a frayed line, Pip hallucinates and says of himself, “Pip? ... Pip jumped from the whaleboat. Pip’s missing.... we haul in no cowards here.” Ahab is struck: "Oh, ye frozen heavens! .... Ye did beget this luckless child, and have abandoned him.... Here, boy; Ahab’s cabin shall be Pip’s home henceforth, .... Come! I feel prouder leading thee by thy black hand, than though I grasped an Emperor’s!"

In chapter 129, on what is to be the last and fatal day of Ahab's pursuit of Moby Dick, Ahab orders Pip to stay behind in the captain's cabin. Pip, alone at the captain's table after Ahab departs, hallucinates again, this time that he is hosting great admirals: "What an odd feeling, now, when a black boy’s host to white men with gold lace upon their coats!" "Monsieurs," Pip addresses them deliriously: "have ye seen one Pip?—a little negro lad, five feet high, hang-dog look, and cowardly! Jumped from a whale-boat once;—seen him? No! Well then, fill up again, captains, and let’s drink shame upon all cowards!"

== Thematic role ==
Critics comment on Pip's thematic role. Although Pip is introduced as "the most insignificant of the Pequod's crew." John Bryant says that the "dramatic irony is that Pip is the mechanism Melville chooses to lure Ahab back to sanity." F.O. Matthiessen observed that one of the "crucial elements in the evolution of the old captain is his relation with Pip, a relation that, in its interplay of madness and wisdom, is endowed with the pathos of the bond between the King Lear and his Fool in King Lear, Shakespeare's tragedy. Andrew Delbanco agrees that Ahab echoes Lear's deference to his Fool in Shakespeare's tragedy.

Chapter 129 "The Cabin: Ahab and Pip," although brief, says Mary Petrus Sullivan, is in many respects the "high point" in Ahab's tragedy. Ahab rejects Pip's offered hand and a chance to offer love. Both are mad, but Pip, says Sullivan, is "utterly generous and self-sacrificing in his insanity."

In chapter 99, Ahab hammers a gold doubloon to the ship's mast as reward for the man who first sights Moby Dick. Each member of the crew sees a meaning in the coin that reflects his view of the world. Pip, coming last says “I look, you look, he looks; we look, ye look, they look.” Pip uses these grammatical forms, says Delbanco, to imply that each sees the world as a reflection of himself.

C.L.R. James, the Trinidadian historian and literary critic who wrote from a Marxist point of view, sees Ahab as a dictator who will bury himself in the wreck of industrial civilization. Pip offers a vision. "Pip plays no great part in the book, as the Pips play no great part in the world. But his importance is in the mind of his creator." Pip's "madness" is only "madness so-called" which in reality is "the wisdom of heaven." When Pip went "mad," he lost fear, "Alone of all the crew he now spoke to the terrible Ahab as one human being to another."

== African-American themes and slavery ==
Pip's status as an African-American does not stand out among the diverse crew of the Pequod, which has sailors from all corners of the world. Pip's introduction in Chapter 93, observes Melville scholar John Bryant, "begins in stereotype but builds through, around, and finally away from his audience's vile assumptions about black consciousness...." Carolyn Karcher points to Ishmael's comment that Pip, "though over tender-hearted, was at bottom very bright," for "even blackness has its brilliancy...." In his native Tolland County, Connecticut, Pip had once enlivened many a fiddler’s frolic on the green" and "had turned the round horizon into one star-belled tambourine." In stating that Pip enjoyed life's pleasure in a way that other races could not, Karcher argues, Melville does approach romantic racialism but refuses to go along with the notion, common at the time, that Pip and his race suffer less sorrow or pain. On the contrary, Pip's love of life and "all life's peaceable securities" made his suffering all the more acute. Pip's joyful pleasure, Karcher continues, "turns sinister against the backdrop of slavery, where song and dance function to deaden pain rather than to express happiness."

In chapter 40 “Midnight, Forecastle,” the sailors urge Pip to dance and play his tambourine, an instrument associated with minstrel shows. Sterling Stuckey, however, finds that Melville rejects the “specter of minstrelsy” in these antics. Melville was well aware, Stuckey says, of the roots of minstrelsy, since he had seen African-American dances as a young man. George Cotkin, on the other hand, writes that Pip may have been reluctant to engage in a black-face performance, and that Melville might have used the incident to illustrate the racial divisions that existed both on ship and in the United States leading up to the American Civil War.

== Popular culture ==
- Pip’s Aria in Jake Heggie's opera, Moby-Dick.
- Rick Moody, "Pip Adrift," in his The Ring of Brightest Angels Around Heaven (Boston: Little, Brown, 1995), 101-12 (first published in Story).
- Alan Cheuse, "Pip: A Story in Three Parts," Michigan Quarterly Review Volume 51, Issue 1, Winter 2012.

== References and further reading ==
- Bryant, John (1997), "The Persistence of Melville: Representative Writer for a Multicultural Age", in Bryant, John; Milder, Robert (eds.), Melville's Evermoving Dawn: Centennial Essays, Kent, Ohio, London: Kent State University Press, pp. 3–28, ISBN 9780873385626.
- Cameron, Sharon (1981). "Ahab and Pip: Those Are Pearls That Were His Eyes". ELH. 48 (3): 573–593. doi:10.2307/2872914. JSTOR 2872914.
- Cotkin, George (2012). Dive Deeper: Journeys with Moby-Dick. New York: Oxford University Press. ISBN 9780199855735.
- Delbanco, Andrew (2005). Melville, His World and Work. New York: Knopf. ISBN 978-0-375-40314-9. OCLC 845847813.
- Freeburg, Christopher (2019). "Pip and the Sounds of Blackness in Moby Dick". In Marrs, Cody (ed.). The New Melville Studies. United Kingdom: Cambridge University Press. pp. 42–52. doi:10.1017/9781108646383.004. ISBN 9781108646383. S2CID 192470591.
- James, Cyril Lionel Robert (2001). Mariners, Renegades & Castaways: The Story of Herman Melville and the World We Live In. Preface by Donald E. Pease. Hanover (N.H.); Hanover (N.H.): Dartmouth College Press; London : University Press of New England. ISBN 9781584650942.
- Karcher, Carolyn L. (2007). "A Jonah's Warning to America in Moby-Dick". In Bloom, Harold (ed.). Herman Melville's Moby-Dick. Infobase. pp. 67–. ISBN 978-0-7910-9363-4. excerpt from Karcher, Carolyn L. (1980), Shadow Over the Promised Land: Slavery, Race, and Violence in Melville's America, Louisiana State University Press, ISBN 0807105651.
- Packham, Jimmy (2017), "Pip's Oceanic Voice: Speech and the Sea in Moby-Dick" (PDF), The Modern Language Review, 112 (3): 567–84, doi:10.5699/modelangrevi.112.3.0567, JSTOR 10.5699/modelangrevi.112.3.0567, S2CID 164258784
- Pease, Donald (2012), "Pip, "Moby-Dick", Melville's Governmentality", Novel: A Forum on Fiction, 45 (3): 327–42, doi:10.1215/00295132-1722980, JSTOR stable/41810119
- Schultz, Elizabeth (2001). "The Common Continent of Men": Visualizing Race in Moby-Dick". Leviathan. 3 (2): 19–34. doi:10.1111/j.1750-1849.2001.tb00107.x. S2CID 143824964.
- Short, Bryan C (2002). "Multitudinous, God-Omnipresent, Coral Insects: Pip, Isabel, and Melville's Miltonic Sublime". Leviathan. 4 (1): 7–28. doi:10.1111/j.1750-1849.2002.tb00053.x. S2CID 144615870.
- Stuckey, Sterling (2008). African Culture and Melville's Art: The Creative Process in Benito Cereno and Moby-Dick. Oxford University Press. ISBN 978-0199706860.
- Sullivan, Mary Petrus (1 September 1965), "Moby Dick: Chapter CXXIX, "The Cabin"", Nineteenth-Century Fiction, 20 (2): 188–190, doi:10.2307/2932547, JSTOR 2932547
