= Moby-Dick (opera) =

Opera by Jake Heggie

- Opera by Jake Heggie
- The piano/vocal score of Moby-Dick
- Librettist: Gene Scheer
- Based on: Moby-Dick by Herman Melville
- Premiere: 30 April 2010; Winspear Opera House, Dallas
- Website: jakeheggie.com/moby-dick-2010

Moby-Dick is an American opera in two acts, with music by Jake Heggie and libretto by Gene Scheer, adapted from Herman Melville's 1851 novel Moby-Dick. The opera received its premiere at Dallas Opera in Dallas, Texas, on 30 April 2010. Heggie dedicated the opera to Stephen Sondheim.

== Composition history ==
In 2005, Dallas Opera commissioned an opera from Heggie, intended for the company's inaugural season in the Winspear Opera House in 2010. In consultation with Terrence McNally, Heggie suggested Moby-Dick as the subject. Subsequently, Dallas Opera shared this commission jointly with San Francisco Opera, San Diego Opera, State Opera of South Australia and Calgary Opera. McNally subsequently withdrew from work on the opera because of health issues. Heggie continued work on the opera in collaboration with Scheer and stage director Leonard Foglia. Scheer estimated that approximately 50% of his libretto used Melville's words directly. Heggie specifically wrote the role of Ahab with Ben Heppner in mind.

== Performance history ==
The Dallas Opera performances occurred from late April to mid-May 2010. The premiere production, directed by Foglia, featured lighting design by Donald Holder, set design by Robert Brill, costume design by Jane Greenwood and projection design by Elaine J. McCarthy. As noted, the cast was headed by Ben Heppner as Ahab, with Morgan Smith as Starbuck, Stephen Costello as Greenhorn and Jonathan Lemalu as Queequeg. The conductor was Patrick Summers. Duncan Osborne, the great-great-grandson of Herman Melville, was in attendance.

The production at the State Opera of South Australia in Adelaide followed in August–September 2011, with Jay Hunter Morris as Ahab.

Calgary Opera staged the work in early 2012, with Heppner, Brett Polegato as Starbuck and Colin Ainsworth as Greenhorn.

San Diego Opera staged its performances in January and February 2012, again with Heppner as Ahab, but he withdrew after the first performance and was replaced by Jay Hunter Morris.

San Francisco Opera produced the opera in November 2012. The San Francisco Opera production was filmed for later television relay, which occurred in late 2013, and was subsequently released on DVD. Jay Hunter Morris was Ahab, and many others in the cast recreated their roles of the Dallas premiere, including Morgan Smith, Stephen Costello and Jonathan Lemalu, as well as conductor Patrick Summers.

Following the initial productions by the companies involved in the commission of the opera, Washington National Opera produced the work in February/March 2014. Los Angeles Opera staged its production in November 2015. Dallas Opera revived the original production in November 2016.

For their January 2018 performance, Utah Opera built a set and created costumes to make the opera more accessible to regional opera companies with constrained budgets. Unlike the earlier productions, the set is designed so that it can be adjusted to many different venues.

The Metropolitan Opera performed Moby-Dick March 3-29 during its 2024-2025 season. Ahab was sung by Brandon Jovanovich.

== Roles ==
Roles, voice types, premiere cast
Role	Voice type	Premiere cast, 30 April 2010 Conductor: Patrick Summers	Met Opera cast, March 2025 Conductor: Karen Kamensek
Captain Ahab	tenor (jugendlich heldentenor, or heldentenor)	Ben Heppner	Brandon Jovanovich
Greenhorn	tenor (lyric tenor)	Stephen Costello	Stephen Costello
Starbuck	baritone	Morgan Smith	Peter Mattei
Queequeg	bass-baritone	Jonathan Lemalu	Ryan Speedo Green
Flask	tenor	Matthew O'Neill	William Burden
Stubb	baritone	Robert Orth	Malcolm MacKenzie
Pip	soprano (breeches role, coloratura)	Talise Trevigne	Janai Brugger
Captain Gardiner	baritone	Jonathan Beyer	Brian Major

== Synopsis ==
=== Act 1 ===
Scenes 1-4. Day One: The whaling ship Pequod has been at sea for one week.

Captain Ahab is alone on deck before dawn. Below deck, most of the crew is sleeping. The harpooneer Queequeg prays and wakes Greenhorn (the novel's Ishmael, renamed for the opera), who is a loner and newcomer to whaling. Dawn breaks and the call is made for "All Hands!" The crew raises the ship's sails. Starbuck, Stubb, and Flask talk about Ahab, whom no one has seen since the Pequod left Nantucket.

After the crew sings of whales, wealth and home, Captain Ahab suddenly appears. He tells them of Moby Dick, the white whale that took off one of his legs. He then nails a gold doubloon to the mast and promises it to the man who first sights Moby Dick. Ahab explains that the real reason for the voyage is to find and destroy this one whale, and calls "Death to Moby Dick!" The crew are excited at this call, except for the first mate, Starbuck. Starbuck confronts Ahab about what this mission, viewing it as futile and blasphemous.

Starbuck teaches Greenhorn about the dangers of whaling. Starbuck ponders that he'll never again see his wife and son. Subsequently, overcome with emotion, he orders Queequeg to complete the lesson. Stubb sights a pod of whales, but Ahab forbids the crew to hunt them, since Moby Dick has not yet been sighted. Starbuck orders the crew to sail on and sends Greenhorn up to the lookout on the masthead. Queequeg then joins Greenhorn.

At sunset, Ahab looks over the wake of the ship and reflects that his obsession deprives him of any enjoyment of beauty, leaving him only with anguish. Queequeg and Greenhorn remain at the masthead. On deck, Starbuck bemoans Ahab's obsession.

Scenes 5-7. Day Two: Three months later

Three months have passed without a single whale hunt for the crew of the Pequod. Stubb jokes with the young Black cabin boy Pip about the sharks that circle the ship. The full crew engages in a dance. However, rising tensions emerge and lead to a dangerous racial fight. Greenhorn suddenly sights a fresh pod of whales. Starbuck finally persuades Ahab to let the men hunt. Starbuck and Stubb harpoon whales, but Flask's boat capsizes and Pip is lost at sea.

On board the Pequod, the crew butcher an enormous whale and render the oil in the burning tryworks. Flask tells Ahab of the search for Pip, but Ahab thinks only of finding Moby Dick. The crew imagines Pip lost and struggling. Flask tells Starbuck that many oil barrels are leaking. Starbuck goes below deck to tell Ahab they must find a port for repairs.

Ahab, concerned only with Moby Dick, listens unmoved by Starbuck's report. Starbuck refuses to leave. Ahab grabs a musket and orders Starbuck to his knees. Greenhorn shouts that Pip has been sighted. Ahab orders Starbuck away.

On deck, the crew hears from Greenhorn of how Queequeg rescued Pip. The men return to work. Greenhorn pleads to Starbuck for assistance for Pip, who has become unhinged. Starbuck ignores the pleas. Seeing the realities of life at sea, Greenhorn decides to befriend Queequeg.

Starbuck returns to Ahab's cabin and finds him asleep. He takes Ahab's musket and contemplates killing Ahab, thinking that doing so may allow him to see his wife and child again. Ahab cries out in his sleep. Starbuck replaces the musket and leaves the cabin.

=== Act 2 ===
Scenes 1-3: Day Three: One year later

As a great storm approaches, Stubb, Flask and the crew sing a jolly work song. At the masthead, Greenhorn and Queequeg talk of traveling together to his native island. Greenhorn wants to learn Queequeg's language and write down their adventures. Queequeg suddenly collapses, and the crew brings him down. Ahab says that he will take the masthead watch himself, as he wants to sight Moby Dick first.

Below deck, Queequeg tells Greenhorn that he is dying and asks that a coffin be built for him. Pip begins to sing a lament, in which Greenhorn joins in.

The storm now surrounds the Pequod. Ahab sings defiantly, whilst lightning bolts engulf the ship and the masts glow with St. Elmo's fire. Ahab demands that the men hold their posts, stating that the white flame is a sign from heaven to guide them to Moby Dick. This freshly inspires the crew, to Starbuck's dismay.

Scenes 4-7. Day Four: The next morning

The Pequod has weathered the storm. From afar, Gardiner, captain of the Rachel, another whaling vessel, pleads for help to search for his 12-year-old son who was lost in the storm. Ahab refuses. Pip replies to Gardiner of the Pequod's own lost boy, then cuts himself. Ahab's clothes are stained with Pip's blood. Ahab orders the ship to sail on, leaving Gardiner behind. Ahab ponders the heartless God who devastates so many lives and baptizes his new harpoon with Pip's blood.

Below deck, Greenhorn sees Queequeg's newly built coffin and contemplates the state of the ship and crew.

On deck, Ahab and Starbuck look over the horizon. Ahab describes his forty years at sea and all that he has left behind, and asks to what purpose, which he cannot answer. He sees in Starbuck's eyes human decency, which touches him. Seizing the moment, Starbuck attempts to persuade Ahab that the ship should return to Nantucket, and the crew return to their families. Ahab seems about to relent, but then he sights Moby Dick on the horizon. In the ensuing excitement, the whale boats are lowered. Ahab looks again in Starbuck's eyes and orders him to remain on board. The crew affirms its loyalty to Ahab.

During the chase, Moby Dick destroys two whale boats in succession, drowning their crews. The whale then rams the Pequod, which sinks. The whale next attacks Ahab's whale boat. All but Ahab jump or fall off. Finally alone with the white whale, Ahab cries out and stabs at Moby Dick, before he is dragged down into the sea.

Epilogue: Many days later

Greenhorn floats on Queequeg's coffin, barely alive, singing Queequeg's prayer. Gardiner calls out, thinking that he has found his missing son. Instead, he realises that Ahab and all but one of the crew of the Pequod have drowned. Gardiner asks Greenhorn his name. Greenhorn replies: "Call me Ishmael."
