= Father Mapple =

- Moby-Dick character
- Created by: Herman Melville

In-universe information
- Gender: Male
- Occupation: Minister
- Nationality: American

Father Mapple is a fictional character in Herman Melville's novel Moby-Dick (1851). A former whaler, he has become a preacher in the New Bedford Whaleman's Chapel. Ishmael, the narrator of the novel, hears Mapple's sermon on the subject of Jonah, who was swallowed by a whale but did not turn against God.

The sermon presents themes which concerned Melville and run through the rest of the novel. Father Mapple believes, as Captain Ahab does, that truth is clear to see, and that human beings must pursue it in spite of all obstacles. Ishmael, on the other hand, finds that truth has many forms and is difficult to see or understand.

== Background ==
=== Models for the character ===
Enoch Mudge, a Methodist minister who was the chaplain of the New Bedford Seamen's Bethel, and Father E. T. Taylor, pastor of the Seamen's Bethel in Boston's North End and another Methodist, served as models for Father Mapple. Before his own whaling voyage, Melville heard Mudge preach at the Seamen's Bethel. Mudge was a contributor to Sailor's Magazine, which in December 1840 printed a series of sermons on Jonah. Father Taylor was a well-known preacher whose admirers included Emerson and Whitman. Both Taylor and Mapple fused Biblical imagery and colloquial language to deliver "anecdotal sermons to rough sailor congregations while perched theatrically on an elevated pulpit decorated with ship gear and backed by a wall painting of a seascape." The rope ladder is Melville's own amplification.

=== Models for the sermon ===
As David S. Reynolds explains, Melville was keenly aware of the popular literature and oratory of his time. Father Mapple's sermon is inspired by the more imaginative style of sermon that was becoming very popular in the United States. In addition, Reynolds argues, that Father Mapple would choose Jonah for a topic is in keeping with a 19th-century tradition of retellings of the biblical account in sermon form; Reynolds cites examples from as early as 1829. Such sermons employed nautical metaphors and colloquialisms, "producing a mixture of the imaginative and the sacred that directly anticipated Father Mapple's salty sermon".

== Father Mapple's sermon ==
In chapters 7–9, Ishmael, a sailor about to sail for Nantucket where he will embark on a whaling voyage with Captain Ahab on the Pequod, goes to the Whaleman's Chapel in New Bedford. Father Mapple appears and climbs a rope ladder to his pulpit, which is the form of a ship's prow: "Its panelled front was in the likeness of a ship’s bluff bows, and the Holy Bible rested on a projecting piece of scroll work, fashioned after a ship's fiddle-headed beak."

Father Mapple addresses the parishioners as "Shipmates" and leads them in a whaling hymn:

The ribs and terrors in the whale
Arched over me a dismal gloom,
While all God's sun-lit waves rolled by,
And lift me deepening down to doom.
...

In black distress, I called my God,
When I could scarce believe him mine,
He bowed his ear to my complaints-
No more the whale did me confine.

With speed he flew to my relief,
As on a radiant dolphin borne;
Awful, yet bright, as lightning shone
The face of my Deliverer God.
...

Mapple then takes as his text "And God had prepared a great fish to swallow up Jonah." The lesson, he says, is a "two-stranded lesson; a lesson to us all as sinful men, and a lesson to me as a pilot of the living God."

Jonah, Mapple begins, refuses God's commandment to go to the city of Nineveh and prophesy against rampant sin but instead tries to flee by taking passage on a ship. The sailors know from merely looking at him that Jonah is some sort of fugitive:

"Jack, he's robbed a widow;" or, "Joe, do you mark him; he's a bigamist;" or, "Harry lad, I guess he's the adulterer that broke jail in old Gomorrah, or belike, one of the missing murderers from Sodom."

But the Lord raises a great storm, and after Jonah confesses to the sailors that his disobedience is the cause, Jonah is "taken up as an anchor and dropped into the sea." Instantly an "oily calmness floats out from the east, and the sea is still." Yet the storm follows Jonah, and he drops "seething into the yawning jaws awaiting him". Jonah prays unto the Lord:

But observe his prayer, and learn a weighty lesson. For sinful as he is, Jonah does not weep and wail for direct deliverance. He feels that his dreadful punishment is just ... And here, shipmates, is true and faithful repentance; not clamorous for pardon, but grateful for punishment.

Mapple returns to the "two-stranded lesson":

Shipmates, God has laid but one hand upon you; both his hands press upon me ... And now how gladly would I ... listen, while some one of you reads me that other and more awful lesson which Jonah teaches to me, as a pilot of the living God. How being an anointed pilot-prophet, or speaker of true things ... Jonah, appalled at the hostility he should raise, fled from his mission, and sought to escape his duty and his God ... This, shipmates, this is that other lesson ... Woe to him who seeks to please rather than to appal! Woe to him whose good name is more to him than goodness! Woe to him who, in this world, courts not dishonor! Woe to him who would not be true, even though to be false were salvation!

== Style ==
Father Mapple speaks the language of Biblical prophets, scholar Nathalia Wright observes. In addition to the twelve quotations from the book of Jonah which appear in the first part of his sermon, he uses Biblical idioms such as "cast him forth", and "spake unto the fish." The interjection of "woe" in the penultimate paragraph derives from the prophets Jeremiah, Isaiah, and Ezekiel. The paragraph with "woes" is followed by a paragraph with "delights": the structure of the two paragraphs is parallel, though the content is antithetical. Besides the structure, the phraseology also echoes the prophets.

== The psalm ==
"The ribs (Note: Substitution for "Death" makes natural the substitution in the next line.) and terrors in the whale,
Arched (Note: Substitution for "Spread" prepared by the preceding substitution.) over me a dismal gloom (Note: Rhyme change enables alliteration and assonance of the stanza's final line.),
While all God's sun-lit waves rolled by,
And left me deepening down to doom (Note: Added assonance and alliteration.).

"I saw the opening maw (Note: Substitution to sustain the whale imagery.) of hell,
With endless pains and sorrows there;
Which none but they that feel can tell--
Oh, I was plunging (Note: Changes heighten the emotional quality and substitute a more vividly specific image.) to despair.

"In black distress, I called my God,
When I could scarce believe him mine,
He bowed his ear to my complaints--
No more the whale did me confine (Note: Keeping the rhyme in a most skilful revision.).

"With speed he flew to my relief,
As on a radiant dolphin (Note: Ingenious substitution for "a cherub's wings.") borne (Note: Eliminates the partial rhyme of "rode" while establishing another partial rhyme with "shone.");
Awful, yet (Note: Substitution for "and," necessary because of the change in meaning of "awful" from the older "filling with awe" to the more modern sense of "terrible" that Melville usually gives it.) bright, as lightning shone
The face of my Deliverer God.

"My song for ever shall record
That terrible, that joyful hour;
I give the glory to my God (Note: Substitution for "Lord" loses the rhyme with "record."),
His all the (Note: Revision to get rid of the awkward trochaic foot.) mercy and the power."

— The hymn in "The Sermon" (Ch.9) with David Battenfeld's commentary on the changes from the source.

2 Death, and the terrors of the grave,
Spread over me their dismal shade;
While floods of high temptations rose,
And made my sinking soul afraid.

3 I saw the opening gates of hell,
With endless pains and sorrows there,
Which none but they that feel, can tell;
While I was hurried to despair.

4 In my distress I call'd my God,
When I could scarce believe him mine;
He bow'd his ear to my complaints;
Then did his grace appear divine.

5 With speed he flew to my relief,
As on a cherub's wings he rode:
Awful and bright as lightning shone
The face of my deliv'rer, God.

8 My song for ever shall record
That terrible, that joyful hour;
And give the glory to the Lord,
Due to his mercy and his pow'r.

— Psalm 18:2-5 & 8, in The Psalms and Hymns... of the Reformed Protestant Dutch Church in North America (Philadelphia 1854)

An example of Melville's appropriation and development of religious material for his own thematic purposes is the hymn in Father Mapple's sermon, which draws upon Psalm 18 in the version of The Psalms and Hymns... of the Reformed Protestant Dutch Church in North America (compare quoteboxes). Melville's changes and revisions transform the generalized theme of the Psalm into something that bears specific correspondence to the story of Jonah. While some of the changes are purely stylistic improvements, the whole exercise demonstrates the author's "ability to keep within the framework of his source while substituting particularized relevant material." While adhering to the meter and rhyme scheme of the original, the second stanza (the hymn's first stanza), is almost completely rewritten to reflect Jonah's situation as stated in the King James Version of the Book of Jonah, especially 2:3: "For thou hadst cast me into the deep, in the midst of the seas; and the floods compassed me about: all thy billows and thy waves passed over me." Unpredictable is the rejection of the word "flood," which appears in the Jonah story as well as in the Psalm. Three stanzas from the Psalm are omitted, probably because their subject matter is not apt for the Jonah story.

== Thematic significance in the novel ==
Father Mapple's sermon addresses questions that fascinated Melville and tensions that run through the rest of the novel, since Father Mapple believes, as does Ahab, that truth is clear to see, and that human beings must pursue it in spite of all obstacles; Ishmael on the other hand finds that truth has many forms and is difficult to see or understand. Reynolds notes that Father Mapple, who changes the common metaphor of God as a ship's pilot and makes himself "the pilot of the living God", confirms "man's capacities as a truth seeker".

John Bryant argues that this sermon of Jonah's duty to deliver God's "appalling message" of destruction to the people of Nineveh parallels Melville's duty to "confront his own readers with the blasphemy yet logic of Ahab's anger and defiance". Nathalia Wright emphasizes Melville's general use of Biblical rhetoric and tone, and that his "prophetic strain" is most distinct in Father Mapple's sermon. Melville has Mapple use "the most familiar linguistic device of the Hebrew prophets", such as the repeated ejaculation "Woefullness of time", "outer darkness", "the blackness of darkness", and "the quick and the dead".

== In adaptations ==
- John Ince plays the part in the 1930 film, in which Father Mapple also has a daughter (played by Joan Bennett) with whom Ahab (John Barrymore) falls in love.
- Father Mapple was played by Orson Welles in the 1956 film.
- Gregory Peck, who played Ahab in the 1956 film, won a Golden Globe as Father Mapple in the 1998 television series.
- In the 2011 television series Donald Sutherland plays Father Mapple.

== Bibliography ==
- Battenfeld, David H. (1955). "The Source for the Hymn in Moby-Dick." American Literature 27, November 1955, 393-6.
- Bryant, John; Springer, Haskell (2007). "Introduction". Moby-Dick: A Longman Critical Edition. New York, Boston: Pearson Education.
- Herman Melville, Moby-Dick, or The Whale (London, New York 1851).
- Heflin, Wilson Lumpkin (2004). Mary K. Bercaw; Edwards, Thomas Farel Heffernan (eds.). Herman Melville's Whaling Years. Vanderbilt UP. ISBN 9780826513823.
- Kerman, Judith B.; Brusso, Andrew (2014). "Moby-Dick". In Jeffrey Weinstock (ed.). The Ashgate Encyclopedia of Literary and Cinematic Monsters. Ashgate. pp. 419–21. ISBN 9781409425625.
- Reynolds, David S. (2011). Beneath the American Renaissance: The Subversive Imagination in the Age of Emerson and Melville. Oxford UP. ISBN 9780199782840.
- Wright, Nathalia (1949). Melville's Use of the Bible. Durham, North Carolina: Duke University Press.
