= Moby Dick (1998 miniseries) =

1998 American television miniseries

- UK DVD cover
- Based on: Moby-Dick by Herman Melville
- Screenplay by: Anton Diether; Franc Roddam; Benedict Fitzgerald (uncredited)
- Directed by: Franc Roddam
- Starring: Patrick Stewart; Henry Thomas; Ted Levine; Bruce Spence; Hugh Keays-Byrne; Gregory Peck
- Countries of origin: United States; Australia
- Original language: English
- No. of episodes: 2

Production
- Executive producers: Robert Halmi Sr. Francis Ford Coppola; Fred Fuchs
- Producers: Franc Roddam; Kris Noble
- Running time: 180 minutes
- Production companies: American Zoetrope; Hallmark Entertainment; Nine Network Australia; USA Pictures
- Budget: US $20 million

Original release
- Network: USA Network
- Release: March 15 – March 16, 1998

Moby Dick is a 1998 American television miniseries directed by Franc Roddam, written by Roddam, Anton Diether, and Benedict Fitzgerald, and executive produced by Francis Ford Coppola. It is based on Herman Melville's 1851 novel of the same name. It was filmed in Australia in 1997 and first released in the United States in 1998. The miniseries consisted of two episodes, each running two hours with commercials on March 15 and 16 of 1998 on the USA Network. This is Gregory Peck's final on-screen role.

== Plot ==
Ishmael is a young sailor who joins the crew of the whaling ship Pequod. At an inn, he befriends Queequeg, a Pacific Islander and experienced harpooner, who joins him on his journey. The captain of the Pequod, Ahab, appears to the crew only after the ship has sailed, and charges them with helping him fulfill his mission of vengeance against the legendary sperm whale Moby Dick, who bit off his leg years earlier.

Starbuck, the ship's first mate, repeatedly pleads with Ahab that by obsessively pursuing Moby Dick and passing up several opportunities to hunt other whales, he is costing them profits, hurting the crew's morale, and endangering the ship, but Ahab rejects his concerns. The Pequod encounters several other ships on its journey, but Ahab receives them coldly, denying the crew any opportunity to socialize, only pausing briefly enough to extract any news of the white whale before making sail. After Pip, the ship's boy, is traumatized from being thrown overboard during a hunt, Queequeg decides the ship is cursed and sits down on deck, passively refusing to do any further work.

As months pass by with no sighting of Moby Dick, Ahab's madness becomes more and more obvious. He refuses to assist another ship, the Rachel, captained by a personal acquaintance, searching for his son lost at sea. He forces the Pequod into an ice field, which the ship barely survives, and refuses to turn away from a massive storm. Yet despite several sailors perishing, the majority of the crew refuse to stop following him in his obsession.

Finally, the Pequod locates Moby Dick, and Ahab personally leads the hunt. Despite being harpooned several times, the whale manages to destroy all of the Pequods whaling boats. Ahab leaps onto the whale's back and repeatedly stabs him, but is tangled in rope and dragged down to his death. Moby Dick then rams and sinks the Pequod. Ishmael is the only survivor, clinging to wreckage until he is found by the Rachel, still searching for its lost son.

== Cast ==
- Patrick Stewart as Captain Ahab
- Henry Thomas as Ishmael
- Gregory Peck as Father Mapple
- Ted Levine as Starbuck
- Bruce Spence as Elijah
- Hugh Keays-Byrne as Mr. Stubb
- Piripi Waretini as Queequeg
- Dominic Purcell as Bulkington
- Norman D. Golden II as Little Pip
- Norman Yemm as Carpenter
- Shane Connor as Mr. Flask
- Peter Sumner as Captain Gardiner
- Janet Andrewartha as Ahab's wife
- Harold Hopkins as Captain Peleg
- Matthew Montoya as Tashtego
- Michael Edward Stevens as Dagoo
- Kee Chan as Fedallah
- Warren Owens as Cook

Patrick Stewart took the lead role shortly after making a striking reference to the book, and quoting from it, in Star Trek: First Contact.

Gregory Peck appeared as Father Mapple more than 40 years after he played Ahab in the 1956 film adaptation directed by John Huston.

== Awards and nominations ==
Moby Dick received award nominations: including five Primetime Emmy Awards, two Golden Globe Awards (winning Best Supporting Actor for Peck), a Satellite Award, and a Television Critics Association Award. Also composer Christopher Gordon was nominated and won for his score including an Australian Guild of Screen Composers Award and a APRA Music Award.

Year	Award	Category	Nominee(s)	Result	Ref.
1998	Artios Awards	Best Casting for Mini-Series	Lynn Kressel	Nominated	
1998	Australian Guild of Screen Composers Awards	Best Original Music in a Television Series or Serial	Christopher Gordon	Nominated	
1998	Australian Guild of Screen Composers Awards	Best Original Title Theme Composed for a Television Series, Serial or Mini-Series	Christopher Gordon	Won	
1998	Australian Guild of Screen Composers Awards	Best Soundtrack Album	Christopher Gordon	Nominated	
1998	International Film Music Critics Association Awards	Best Original Score for an Adventure Film	Christopher Gordon	Nominated	
1998	Online Film & Television Association Awards	Best Actor in a Motion Picture or Miniseries	Patrick Stewart	Nominated	
1998	Online Film & Television Association Awards	Best Sound in a Motion Picture or Miniseries		Nominated	
1998	Online Film & Television Association Awards	Best Visual Effects in a Motion Picture or Miniseries		Nominated	
1998	Primetime Emmy Awards	Outstanding Miniseries	Robert Halmi Sr., Francis Ford Coppola, Fred Fuchs, Franc Roddam, Kris Noble, and Steven R. McGlothen	Nominated	
1998	Primetime Emmy Awards	Outstanding Lead Actor in a Miniseries or a Movie	Patrick Stewart	Nominated	
1998	Primetime Emmy Awards	Outstanding Supporting Actor in a Miniseries or a Movie	Gregory Peck	Nominated	
1998	Primetime Emmy Awards	Outstanding Art Direction for a Miniseries or a Movie	Leslie Binns, Andrew Walpole, Peter Kendall, and Jill Eden	Nominated	
1998	Primetime Emmy Awards	Outstanding Special Visual Effects for a Miniseries or a Movie	Brian Pearce, Peter Armstrong, Rob Heggie, Lisa Wang, Dale Duguid, James Rogers, Tim Crosbie, Ry Snow, Kit Amore, Jamie Doolan, Mike Logan, David Tremont, and Graham Duesberry	Nominated	
1998	Television Critics Association Awards	Outstanding Achievement in Movies, Miniseries and Specials		Nominated	
1999	Australasian Performing Right Association Awards	Best Television Theme	Christopher Gordon	Won	
1999	Australian Cinematographers Society	Award of Distinction (Telefeatures, TV Drama & Mini-series)	David Connell	Won	
1999	Golden Globe Awards	Best Actor in a Miniseries or Motion Picture Made for Television	Patrick Stewart	Nominated	
1999	Golden Globe Awards	Best Supporting Actor in a Series, Miniseries or Motion Picture Made for Television	Gregory Peck	Won (Note: Tied with Don Cheadle for The Rat Pack.)	
1999	Satellite Awards	Best Actor in a Miniseries or a Motion Picture Made for Television	Patrick Stewart	Nominated	
