= Steve Darrell =

American actor (1904–70)

Steve Darrell (born Darrell Eugene Horsfall, November 19, 1904 – August 14, 1970) was an American actor, also known as Stevan Darrell or Steven Darrell.

== Early life and career ==
A native of Osage, Iowa, Darrell was the first of four children born to Moss David Horsfall and Katherine Agnes McHugh. He attended Washington High School in Cedar Rapids.

Darrell's career began in 1931 when he acted with the Trousdale Players in Des Moines, Iowa, and worked with the Cedar Rapids Community Players.

He was cast as Tashtego in the 1954 Hallmark Hall of Fame episode, "Moby Dick", and as the wise Comanche chief Little Elk in the 1958 episode "Renegades" of Cheyenne.

== Death ==
Darrell died from a brain tumor in Hollywood, California. He is buried at Westwood Village Memorial Park Cemetery.

== Partial filmography ==
- Code of the Secret Service (1939)
- Nothing but Trouble (1944)
- Heldorado (1946)
- Roll on Texas Moon (1946)
- Terrors on Horseback (1946)
- Lightning Raiders (1946)
- Gentlemen with Guns (1946)
- On the Old Spanish Trail (1947)
- Prairie Express (1947)
- Trailing Danger (1947)
- Valley of Fear (1947)
- Adventures of Frank and Jesse James (1948)
- Carson City Raiders (1948)
- I Wouldn't Be in Your Shoes (1948)
- Night Time in Nevada (1948)
- Partners of the Sunset (1948)
- Abandoned (1949)
- Riders in the Sky (1949)
- The Blazing Trail (1949)
- The Blazing Sun (1950)
- Cow Town (1950)
- Pecos River (1951)
- Jack Slade (1953)
- Dangerous Mission (1954)
- Hallmark Hall of Fame
  - 1954 episode, "Moby Dick" as Tashtego
- Tarantula (1955)
- The Tall Men (1955) as Colonel Norris, U.S. Cavalry
- Treasure of Ruby Hills (1955)
- The Proud Ones (1956)
- Utah Blaine (1957)
- The Monolith Monsters (1957)
- The Rifleman (1959) (S2:E4) as Ben Russell
- Wanted Dead or Alive (TV series)
  - season 2 episode 8 (Bad Gun) : Sheriff Simmons
  - season 2 episode 16 (Vanishing Act) : Sheriff Toole
- Gunsmoke (1965) as Judge
