= Moby Dick (1930 film) =

1930 film

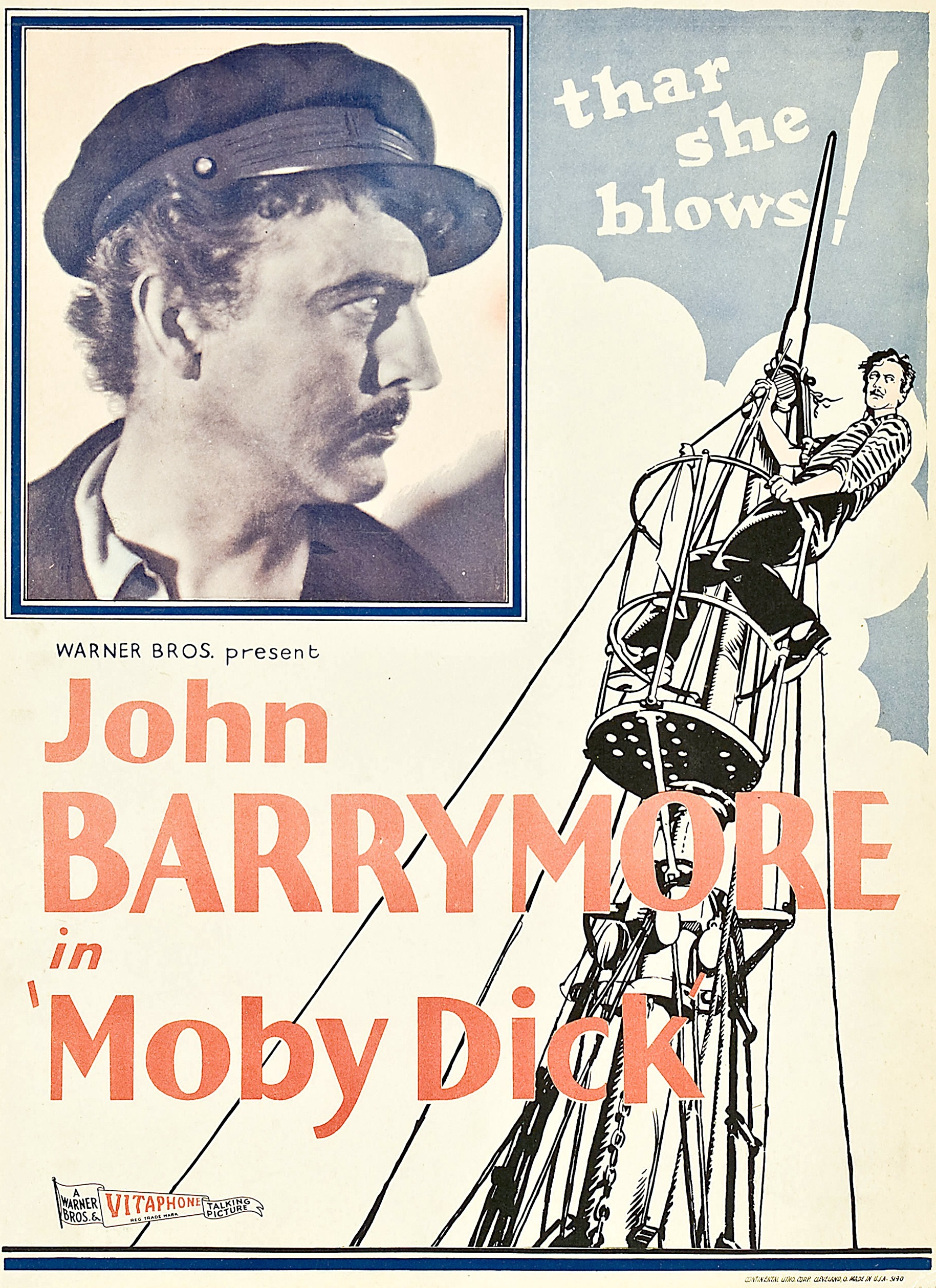
- Theatrical poster
- Directed by: Lloyd Bacon
- Written by: Oliver H.P. Garrett (adaptation)
- Screenplay by: J. Grubb Alexander
- Based on: Moby-Dick; 1851 novel by Herman Melville
- Produced by: Hal B. Wallis; Harry M. Warner; Jack L. Warner
- Starring: John Barrymore
- Cinematography: Robert Kurrle
- Edited by: Desmond O'Brien
- Music by: William Axt; David Mendoza
- Production company: The Vitaphone Corp.
- Distributed by: Warner Bros. Pictures, Inc.
- Release date: September 30, 1930
- Running time: 80 minutes
- Country: United States
- Language: English
- Budget: $604,000
- Box office: $797,000

Moby Dick is a 1930 American pre-Code film from Warner Bros. Pictures, directed by Lloyd Bacon, and starring John Barrymore, Joan Bennett and Walter Lang. The film is a sound remake of the 1926 silent movie, The Sea Beast, which also starred Barrymore. It is the first film adaptation of Herman Melville's 1851 novel Moby-Dick that includes a soundtrack.

== Plot ==
Moby Dick (1930)

The film tells of a sea captain's maniacal quest for revenge on the great white whale that bit off his leg.

After disembarking in New Bedford, Ahab Ceely meets and falls in love with Faith Mapple, the daughter of the local minister. Although courted by Ahab's brother Derek, she falls in love with the daring Ahab. She is heartbroken when he leaves on another voyage, but says she will wait three years for him to return. During this next voyage, Ahab loses his right leg to Moby Dick, a white whale. When Ahab returns to New Bedford, he mistakenly believes that the woman he loves no longer wants to see him because of his disfigurement, an opinion encouraged by Ahab's brother, who wants Faith for himself. Ahab vows revenge against the whale, to kill it or be killed in the process, and returns to sea. Eventually, Ahab raises enough capital to buy his own ship, but no one wants to sail with him because of his passion for destroying Moby Dick. On a resupply visit to New Bedford, most of the crew deserts the ship. Ahab directs his first mate to shanghai the necessary men and unknowingly takes his brother on board. During a storm, the crew mutinies and Ahab's brother tries to kill him; he fails, and Queequeg breaks his back. Ahab orders that Derek be taken to Ahab's cabin. Moby Dick is sighted, and Ahab leads the boats out to get him. Driven by bloodlust, he stands on Moby Dick's back and stabs him repeatedly with a harpoon as the dying whale's spouting blood covers him. The crew renders the whale for oil, and they return to New Bedford, where Ahab and Faith are reunited.

== Cast ==
- John Barrymore as Captain Ahab Ceely
- Joan Bennett as Faith Mapple
- Lloyd Hughes as Derek Ceely
- Noble Johnson as Queequeg
- Nigel De Brulier as Elijah
- Walter Long as Mr Stubbs
- May Boley as Whale Oil Rosie
- Tom O'Brien as Starbuck
- John Ince as Reverend Mapple

== Foreign-language versions ==
One foreign-language version of the 1930 film of Moby Dick was produced. The German version was titled Dämon des Meeres and was directed by Michael Curtiz.

== Box office ==
According to records at Warner Bros., the film earned $579,000 in the U.S. and $218,000 in other markets.

== Reception ==
In his August 15, 1930, review, The New York Times critic Mordaunt Hall compared Moby Dick to The Sea Beast: "Enhanced by a variety of sounds and the power of speech, the audible picturization…(is) a far more impressive melodrama than the silent version, which was presented here three and a half years ago. And John Barrymore, who fills the rôle of the indomitable, half-crazed Ahab Ceeley, gives a performance that puts his work, even the latter part of the mute offering, in the shade. With all the liberties taken with the original story, … It is a well-knit tale of the men who went down to the seas in whaling ships and when one hears the man in the main top shouting, "Thar she blows!" it creates a thrill such as the screen is seldom capable of affording. One is willing to overlook melodramatic glimpses, for the picture as a whole is splendidly handled. Twice during the unfurling of this story the screen is enlarged and compelling scenes are projected. Sometimes it is the whaler under full sail silhouetted on the sun-silvered, choppy sea. Another time it is the wild-eyed Ahab's ship battling against a realistic storm. Then there are flashes of the shanghaied crew, a gang of cutthroats described as more accustomed to murder than hurling harpoons at whales.The story races along, and it matters not if the whale is real or not, for the effect is there, whether the white monster of the deep is pulling the small boat through the water at amazing speed, dashing it to bits with a swish of its tail, or, when its great bulk is seen with what looks like a Lilliputian sticking something that looks no larger than a good-sized needle into its half-submerged form. Then follow close-ups that last night caused more than one woman to cover her eyes with her program, for in these glimpses Ahab is seen vigorously getting his revenge on the white whale that had bitten off half his right leg in an earlier cruise.The scenes in New Bedford and the romance of Ahab and Faith are capitally pictured and flawlessly acted....Lloyd Hughes has a real opportunity this time, in the part of the treacherous Derek, to reveal his histrionic ability...There is also a clever dog, (whose devotion)... is subtly portrayed in contrast with the conduct of Faith when she is shocked by the realization that Ahab has returned with a peg-leg. Lloyd Bacon, the director, has done an excellent job. He has inculcated feeling into his picture as well as lending to it sterling photographic effects. Moreover, he has taken full advantage of the chances for sound, whether it is the lapping of the water, the noises aboard ship during the excitement of sighting a whale or those on the vessel when the whalers return joyously to their home port. Mr. Barrymore is Mr. Barrymore of the stage in this film, and not the great silent lover who is made to turn his profile to the camera on the slightest provocation. Words bring out his true talent, ...There is no shilly-shallying in his portrayal of the character, which makes a whaler a man of the seas, one who gloats over the tattooed figures of women on his arm and who evidently only represses oaths when confronted by the charming presence of Faith. Although there is the sequence where a red-hot iron is used on the stump of Ahab's leg, it is filmed less extravagantly than it was in the old silent film. True, there is the agony and the director does not mince matters in giving the details, but once it is over he shifts quickly to a gentle scene depicting Faith in her home. (Miss Bennett's) ...acting is enough to make even a hardened soul wish for a happy ending. The Sea Beast was a huge success...but this vocalized "Moby Dick" should reap an infinitely greater reward."

== Preservation status ==
The film survives intact and has been broadcast on television and cable and is available through Warner Archive DVD-on-demand. A print has long been preserved at the Library of Congress.

== Comparison to novel ==
This Moby Dick bears little resemblance to the novel. The filmmakers even put words in Melville's mouth. Marc Di Paolo describes it as "a poorly conceived and unfaithful version...in which Ahab...slays the white whale at the end and goes home to his true love." Walter C. Metz observes that the film excludes the novel's central character Ishmael and "produces a conventional Hollywood love story between Ahab and Faith, the invented daughter of Rev. Mapple, whose moral purity reforms Ahab from a bawdy sailor into a marriageable man." The filmmakers created Ahab's back story, creating a love story that does not appear in the novel.
