= Dale Duguid =

Australian filmmaker

Dale Duguid is an Australian visual effects supervisor and production designer who is credited on multiple films and TV series. After a career spanning production design, art direction, directing and screenwriting, Duguid established a viable visual effects industry for long form production within Australia through the creation of the Visual Effects design and production company Photon Stockman in 1991. Duguid was recognised with a medal from Queen Elizabeth II for having been a prime mover for the VFX industry in Australia. According to one report: "He was awarded the Australian Centenary Medal in the 2001 Queen's New Years Honours List for his services to the Queensland film industry."

Duguid’s VFX credits include Superman Returns, Australia, House of Wax, Ghost Ship, and several others. His most recent listed movie which he worked on was The Chronicles of Narnia: The Voyage of the Dawn Treader (2010). Duguid has worked with some noted Hollywood talent, and contributed to visual effects nominated for an Oscar (on Superman Returns produced by Gil Adler), and an Emmy award (for mini-series, Moby Dick, which starred Patrick Stewart as Captain Ahab, and was produced by Francis Ford Coppola). Duguid was also an executive producer and CEO of SMI-photon, a visual effects and animation multi-national with interests in Beijing, Hong Kong and Australia.

== Accolades ==
Accolades received by Dale Duguid
| Award | Date of ceremony | Category | Recipient(s) | Result | Ref(s) |
|---|---|---|---|---|---|
| Emmy Awards | September 13, 1998 | Primetime Emmy Award for Outstanding Special Visual Effects | Moby Dick | Nominated | |
