= Bulkington (character) =

Character from the novel Moby-Dick

- Moby-Dick character
- Created by: Herman Melville

In-universe information
- Gender: Male
- Occupation: Sailor
- Nationality: American

Bulkington is a character in Herman Melville's 1851 novel Moby-Dick. Bulkington is referred to only by his last name and appears only twice, briefly in Chapter 3, "The Spouter Inn", and then in Chapter 23, "The Lee Shore", a short chapter of several hundred words devoted entirely to him.

Critics and scholars, however, have paid attention to his role. Some see Bulkington as representing a historical or contemporary figure, or take his early appearance and then disappearance to bolster the theory that Melville composed the novel in several stages and Bulkington became unnecessary when Melville expanded his conception.

The Bulkington Pass is on the south side of the Flask Glacier and west of Bildad Peak, a series of features that the United Kingdom Antarctic Place-names Committee named after characters from Moby-Dick.

== Appearances ==
In Chapter 3, "The Spouter Inn", the crew of the ship USS Grampus celebrate their return from three years at sea. Bulkington stands aloof but Ishmael says "this man interested me at once; and since the sea-gods had ordained that he should soon become my shipmate (though but a sleeping-partner one, so far as this narrative is concerned)", that he will give a "little description of him". Bulkington is tall, with "noble shoulders", muscular, with a face that is "deeply brown and burnt", while his voice indicates that he was a Southerner. He slips away and is soon missed by his shipmates, who pursue him with cries of "Where's Bulkington?"

Bulkington does not appear again until Chapter 23, "The Lee Shore", and does not appear after it. Ishmael calls the chapter the "stoneless grave of Bulkington", since in it he announces Bulkington will die, and, because it is so short, a "six inch chapter" (in fact, 361 words). Since Bulkington had just returned from four years at sea, Ishmael is amazed to see him standing at the helm of the Pequod, guiding it from the harbor. Bulkington, he muses, is driven to sea just as a ship is driven to the lee shore – "the land seemed scorching to his feet". Ishmael sees a parallel and a paradox: A favorable wind drives a ship toward the warmth and safety of its home port, but when a gale drives it to destruction on the shore, the ship must avoid the seeming warmth and safety of home to put on all sail to seek safety in the "landless sea". Bulkington, says Ishmael, should recognize that, likewise, the soul must keep to the "open independence" of her sea. "But as in landlessness alone resides highest truth, shoreless, indefinite as God – so better is it to perish in that howling infinite, than be ingloriously dashed upon the lee, even if that were safety!" Ishmael foretells Bulkington's death by drowning: "Up from the spray of thy ocean-perishing – straight up, leaps thy apotheosis!"

== Critical discussion ==
Bulkington's striking physical appearance and the poetic force and thematic resonance of Chapter 23 have intrigued critics. Andrew Delbanco writes that Bulkington is a "natural aristocrat – an almost cartoonish paragon of manly virtue", the "democratic leader who commands respect out of trust and comradely love". Critics see resemblances to historical or mythological figures, such as Hercules, the Greek god, or a tribute to J. M. W. Turner (1775–1851), one of the many references in the novel to that painter of sea scenes and storms, and to Edgar Allan Poe. Chapter 23 may represent the virtues of Emersonian "self-reliance" in the quest for truth, and the preference for philosophical realities.

Scholars and critics offer other answers to the question of why he appeared so briefly. The literary critic Richard Chase postulated that Bulkington was the novel's "true Promethean hero," but one who could not play an important role because such a hero would have to resist Ahab, the novel's "false" Prometheus. He must disappear because "if he had been more a part of the story it would have been inevitable that he should do what Starbuck can only try to do: oppose the command of Ahab and save the ship". But he is also the “heroic American”, the "hope of the world", as only they see themselves.

== In Melville's process of composition ==
Critics have long speculated that Bulkington was introduced in an early draft but was no longer needed when Melville changed his concept of the novel from a whaling adventure to a metaphysical tale focused on Ahab's quest. The second version needed a different sort of character to contrast with Ahab, a character who turned out to be Starbuck, Pequod's first mate. Melville, some scholars speculate, then inserted Chapter 23 to explain Bulkington's disappearance.

"Detailed reconstruction of Melville's revision of Moby-Dick", says Delbanco, "is impossible since no manuscript or notes survive. But that he changed his ideas about who should lead and who should resist aboard the Pequod can hardly be doubted". Delbanco argues that Bulkington seems destined to play a major role in the book for he has "dignity, bearing, refinement", which make him Melville's first candidate to resist Ahab. Instead, Melville gives that role to a lesser man, Starbuck, who recognizes Ahab's madness but does not have Bulkington's strength to challenge him. "But why leave him in the book at all?", Delbanco asks. His own answer is that long before Freud, Melville was representing the unconscious in words, and Bulkington was what Freud would call a "memory-trace".

One critic speculates that Melville chose not to revise chapter 3, "The Spouter-Inn", to remove Bulkington, but to add a chapter apotheosizing him as a character who, "though absent, represents his own artistic strivings for truth and independence of thought in the face of forces that would conspire to cast him 'on the treacherous, slavish shore'".

Harrison Hayford speculates as part of a larger argument that Bulkington is one of a group of "unnecessary duplicates", one who was left "vestigial" when Melville changed the relation between the characters. Hayford speculates that when Melville added the character Queequeg, he took Bulkington's role as Ishmael's companion, or "sleeping partner". His implied role as "truth-seeker" was given to Starbuck. Hayford offers no guess for why Melville did not remove Bulkington entirely, "beyond the humdrum one that Melville, like lesser writers, found it hard to throw away good words he had written".
