= Ishmael (Moby-Dick) =

Fictional character from the novel Moby-Dick

- Moby-Dick character
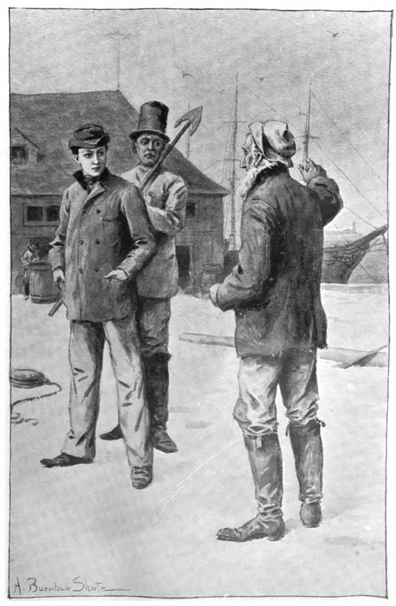
- Ishmael (left) depicted in a 1920 edition of the book
- Created by: Herman Melville

In-universe information
- Gender: Male
- Occupation: Schoolmaster; sailor; oarsman; whaler
- Family: Unnamed stepmother John D'Wolf (uncle)
- Children: At least one (implied)
- Nationality: American

Ishmael is a character in Herman Melville's Moby-Dick (1851), which opens with the line "Call me Ishmael." He is the first-person narrator of the book. Because Ishmael plays a minor role in the plot, early critics of Moby-Dick assumed that Captain Ahab was the protagonist. Many either confused Ishmael with Melville or overlooked the role he played. Later critics distinguished Ishmael from Melville, and some saw his mystic and speculative consciousness as the novel's central force rather than Captain Ahab's monomaniacal force of will.

The Biblical name Ishmael has come to symbolize orphans, exiles, and social outcasts. By contrast with his eponym from the Book of Genesis, who is banished into the desert, Melville's Ishmael wanders upon the sea. Each Ishmael, however, experiences a miraculous rescue; in the Bible from thirst, in the novel from drowning.

== Characteristics ==
Both Ahab and Ishmael are fascinated by the whale, but whereas Ahab perceives him exclusively as evil, Ishmael keeps an open mind. Ahab has a static world view, blind to new information, but Ishmael's world view is constantly in flux as new insights and realizations occur. "And flux in turn ... is the chief characteristic of Ishmael himself." In the chapter "The Doubloon", Ishmael reports how each spectator sees his own personality reflected in the coin, but does not look at it himself. Fourteen chapters later, in "The Gilder", he participates in "what is clearly a recapitulation" of the earlier chapter. The difference is that the surface of the golden sea in "The Gilder" is alive, whereas the surface of the doubloon is unalterably fixed, "only one of several contrasts between Ishmael and Ahab."

Ishmael meditates on a wide range of topics. In addition to explicitly philosophical references, in Chapter 89, for instance, he expounds on the legal concept, "Fast-Fish and Loose-Fish", which he takes to mean that possession, rather than a moral claim, bestows the right of ownership.

== Biography ==
Ishmael, like Melville, first worked as a school teacher before securing a position on a merchant vessel. After several voyages in the merchant service, he decides to sail as a green hand on a whaling ship, leaving from Nantucket.

Ishmael first travels from Manhattan Island to New Bedford. The inn is crowded, and he must share a bed with the tattooed Polynesian, Queequeg, a harpooneer whom Ishmael assumes to be a cannibal. Two days later Ishmael and Queequeg head for Nantucket. Ishmael signs up for a voyage on the whaler Pequod, under Captain Ahab. Ahab is obsessed with the white whale, Moby Dick, who on a previous voyage had severed his leg. In his quest for revenge Ahab has lost all sense of responsibility, and when the whale sinks the ship and destroys the whaleboats, all crewmembers drown with the exception of Ishmael: "And I only am escaped alone to tell thee". (Note: "Only I am escaped alone to tell thee" is a tagline repeated several times in the opening scenes of the Book of Job, as Job's servants report the various calamities that have befallen his family, household, and possessions. This quotation from Job is used as the epigraph of the final chapter of Moby-Dick.) A life buoy fashioned from Queequeg's coffin (Note: The coffin had previously been made by the ship's carpenter for Queequeg when the latter was suffering from a severe fever.) bobs up to the surface, and Ishmael keeps himself afloat on it until another whaling ship, the Rachel, arrives to rescue him.

== Family ==
The only family Ishmael mentions include an unnamed stepmother and an uncle, Captain D'Wolf. John D'Wolf, in reality, was Melville's uncle, having married his paternal aunt Mary. Ishmael, writing the narrative of the book as an older man, also implies in Chapter 35 that he's a father ("we fathers being the original inventors and patentees...").

In Chapter 132, "The Symphony", the following paragraph is found in the American edition but not in the English edition:

Oh, immortal infancy, and innocency of the azure! Invisible winged creatures that frolic all round us! Sweet childhood of air and sky! how oblivious were ye of old Ahab’s close-coiled woe! But so have I seen little Miriam and Martha, laughing-eyed elves, heedlessly gambol around their old sire; sporting with the circle of singed locks which grew on the marge of that burnt-out crater of his brain.

"Miriam and Martha" may, it is speculated, be the names of Ishmael's daughters, whom he had after the events of the novel but before his narration of the events (which, after all, begins with "Some years ago—never mind how long precisely—", and contains several anachronistic anecdotes).

== Ishmael (Old Testament) ==
The name Ishmael is Biblical in origin: in Genesis 16:1-16; 17:18-25; 21:6-21; 25:9-17, Ishmael was the son of Abraham by Hagar. In 21:6-21, the most significant verses for Melville's allegory, Hagar was cast off after the birth of Isaac, who inherited the covenant of the Lord instead of his older half-brother.

Melville shapes his allegory to the Biblical Ishmael as follows:

- Biblical Ishmael is banished to "the wilderness of Beer-sheba", while the narrator of Moby-Dick wanders, in his own words, in "the wilderness of waters." In the Bible, the desert or wilderness is a common setting for a vision of one kind or another. By contrast, Melville's Ishmael takes to sea searching for insights.
- In Genesis, Hagar was visited by an angel who instructed her to call her still unborn child Yishma'el, meaning "God shall hear". This prophecy was fulfilled when Ishmael, perishing in the desert, was saved by a miracle: the sudden appearance of a well of water. In Moby-Dick, only Ishmael escapes the sinking of the Pequod, which is described as "that by a margin so narrow as to seem miraculous."
- In direct translation from the Hebrew Bible about Ishmael: "His hand in all, and the hand of all in him."

The name further points to a Biblical analogy that marks Ishmael as the prototype of "wanderer and outcast", the man set at odds with his fellows. Nathalia Wright says that all Melville's heroes—with the exception of Benito Cereno and Billy Budd—are manifestations of the Biblical Ishmael, and four are actually identified with him: Redburn, Ishmael, Pierre, and Pitch from The Confidence-Man.

== Critical views ==
During the early decades of the Melville revival, readers and critics often confused Ishmael with Melville, whose works were perceived as autobiography. The critic F.O. Matthiessen complained as early as 1941 that "most of the criticism of our past masters has been perfunctorily tacked onto biographies" and objected to the "modern fallacy" of the "direct reading of an author's personal life into his works." In 1948 Howard P. Vincent, in his study The Trying-Out of Moby-Dick, "warned against forgetting the narrator", that is, assuming that Ishmael was merely describing what he saw. Robert Zoellner pointed out that Ishmael's role as narrator "breaks down" either when Ahab and Stubb "have a conversation off by themselves" in chapter 29 or else when Ishmael reports "the soliloquy of Ahab sitting alone" in chapter 37.

Views also differ as to whether the protagonist is Ishmael or Ahab. M.H. Abrams finds Ishmael is "only a minor or peripheral" participant in the story he tells, but Walter Bezanson argues that the novel is not so much about Ahab or the White Whale as it is about Ishmael, who is "the real center of meaning and the defining force of the novel."

Bezanson argues that there are two Ishmaels. The first is the narrator, "the enfolding sensibility of the novel" and "the imagination through which all matters of the book pass." The reader is not told how long after the voyage Ishmael begins to tell his adventure, the second sentence's "some years ago" being the only clue. The "second Ishmael", continues Bezanson, is "forecastle Ishmael", or the "younger Ishmael of 'some years ago.'... Narrator Ishmael is merely young Ishmael grown older." Forecastle Ishmael is "simply one of the characters in the novel, though, to be sure, a major one whose significance is possibly next to Ahab's." From time to time there are shifts of tense to indicate that "while forecastle Ishmael is busy hunting whales, narrator Ishmael is sifting memory and imagination in search of the many meanings of the dark adventure he has experienced."

In a 1986 essay, Bezanson calls Ishmael "not even particularly interesting except as the narrator, a mature and complex sensibility, examines his inner life from a distance, just as he examines the inner life of Ahab..."

John Bryant points out that as the novel progresses the central character is "flip-flopping from Ishmael to Ahab". The beginning of the book is "comedy" in which anxious Ishmael and serene Queequeg "bed down, get 'married,' and take off on a whaling adventure come-what-may." After Ahab enters in Ch. 29, Ishmael, who does not reappear until Ch. 41, is no longer the "central character", but the novel's "central consciousness and narrative voice". As his role as a character erodes, says Bryant, "his life as a lyrical, poetic meditator upon whales and whaling transforms the novel once again...." Ishmael wrestles with the realization that he cannot follow Ahab to a fiery doom but must be content with "attainable felicity", (Ch. 94) but Ahab then takes over once more.

Narrator-Ishmael demonstrates "an insatiable curiosity" and an "inexhaustible sense of wonder", says Bezanson, but has not yet fully understood his adventures: "'It was the whiteness of the whale that above all things appalled me. But how can I hope to explain myself here; and yet, in some dim, random way, explain myself I must, else all these chapters might be naught.'" This Ishmael must not be equated with Melville himself: "we resist any one-to-one equation of Melville and Ishmael." Bezanson does attribute characteristic Melvillean features to the narrator, who in the Epilogue, likens himself to "another Ixion".

Bezanson also insists that it would be a mistake "to think the narrator indifferent to how his tale is told." Earlier critics charged that Melville did not pay a great deal of attention to point of view, "and of course this is true" in Henry James's sense of the technique, yet Ishmael-narrator's "struggle" with the shaping of his narrative, "under constant discussion, is itself one of the major themes of the book." Ishmael deploys, among other genres and styles, a sermon, a dream, a comic set-piece, a midnight ballet, a meditation, and an emblematic reading.

== Actors who have played Ishmael ==
- Howard Duff in the 1948 NBC Favorite Story radio adaptation in which William Conrad portrayed Ahab.
- Richard Basehart in Moby Dick, a 1956 film adaptation in which Gregory Peck plays Ahab.
- Henry Thomas in Moby Dick, a 1998 television miniseries adaptation in which Patrick Stewart plays Ahab.
- Tim Guinee in Animated Epics: Moby Dick, a 2000 animated movie in which Rod Steiger provides the voice of Ahab.
- Terry O'Neill in The League of Extraordinary Gentlemen, a 2003 film based on the comic book of the same name, as the first mate of Captain Nemo.
- Jack Aranson (and 8 other characters) in a 2003 stage adaptation of the book.
- F. Murray Abraham in the 2006 three-part BBC Radio 4 radio play.
- Renee O'Connor plays Michelle Herman, a female counterpart of Ishmael in Moby Dick, a 2010 modern-day film adaptation in which Barry Bostwick plays Ahab.
- Charlie Cox in Moby Dick, a 2011 television miniseries adaptation in which William Hurt plays Ahab.
- Stephen Costello plays Greenhorn, the renamed Ishmael character, in the 2010 opera version by Jake Heggie.
- PJ Brennan as a young man in the 2010 two-part BBC Radio 4 radio play.
