= Stephen Costello =

American opera singer (born 1981)

Stephen John Costello (born September 29, 1981 in Philadelphia) is an American operatic tenor and a recipient of the 2009 Richard Tucker Award. Costello has performed in noted opera houses around the world including Covent Garden, Metropolitan Opera, and Lyric Opera of Chicago. In 2010, Costello originated the role of Greenhorn (Ishmael) in the world premiere of Jake Heggie's Moby-Dick at the Dallas Opera.

== Education and vocal training ==
A native of Philadelphia, Costello is a 2007 graduate of that city's Academy of Vocal Arts, where he performed the Duke in Rigoletto, Rodolfo in La bohème, Nemorino in L'elisir d'amore, Ferrando in Così fan tutte, Fritz in L'amico Fritz, Roberto in Le villi, and Des Grieux in Massenet’s Manon. He studied with voice teacher Bill Schuman.

== Professional operatic career ==
While still in school, Costello made his professional debut as Rodolfo in La bohème with the Fort Worth Opera in March 2006, and his European debut with Opéra National de Bordeaux as Nemorino in L'elisir d'amore in September 2006. Also in 2006, he made debuts with the Dallas Opera as Leicester in Maria Stuarda and with Opera Orchestra of New York as the Fisherman in Guillaume Tell (his Carnegie Hall debut).

Costello made his debut at the Metropolitan Opera on the opening night of its 2007-2008 season, as Arturo in Lucia di Lammermoor He portrayed Cassio in Verdi's Otello at the Salzburg Festival in 2008. He made his debut at Covent Garden in 2009 as Carlo in Linda di Chamounix. That same season, he debuted at Lyric Opera of Chicago as Camille in The Merry Widow and at the Tchaikovsky Concert Hall in Moscow as Roméo in Roméo et Juliette, the role of his subsequent San Diego Opera debut. Other notable roles include Christian in Cyrano with Opera Company of Philadelphia, the title role of Roberto Devereux at The Dallas Opera and Rinuccio in Gianni Schicchi at the Spoleto Festival conducted by James Conlon.

On April 30, 2010, Costello originated the role of Greenhorn (Ishmael) in the world premiere of Jake Heggie's Moby-Dick at The Dallas Opera (with Ben Heppner as Captain Ahab). In 2010, he also appeared as Rodolfo in La bohème at Deutsche Oper Berlin, Cincinnati Opera, and Wiener Staatsoper, and debuted at the Salzburg Festival in Roméo et Juliette. In November 2010, he portrayed Percy in Anna Bolena, and thereby portrayed the 3 lead tenor characters in each of Donizetti's Tudor Operas within a 4-season span at the Dallas Opera. His debut at the Santa Fe Opera was as Roméo in Roméo et Juliette in July 2016.

== Honors ==
In addition to the 2009 Richard Tucker Award, Costello received a 2007 Career Grant from the Richard Tucker Music Foundation, as well as a 2006 Sara Tucker Study Grant. He won First Prize in the 2006 George London Foundation For Singers Competition, First Prize and Audience Prize in the Giargiari Bel Canto Competition at the Academy of Vocal Arts, and First Prize in the Licia Albanese Puccini Foundation Competition.

== Sources ==
- Cappelletto, Sandro, "Quel padrino di Puccini", La Stampa, July 4, 2009
- De Butts, Lucy, "Review: Linda di Chamounix, Royal Opera House", The Independent, September 15, 2009
- Midgette, Anne, "Moby-Dick premieres in Dallas", Washington Post, May 3, 2010
- Philadelphia Inquirer, "Philadelphia native tenor wins Richard Tucker Award", April 17, 2009, p. B8
- Oshinsky, Matthew "Rising tenor returns to Ocean Grove, where his career began", The Star-Ledger, July 17, 2009
- Taylor, Kate, "Tenors in Training: The Next Generation", New York Sun, August 18, 2008
