= Captain Ahab =

Fictional character from the novel Moby-Dick

Ahab
- Moby-Dick character
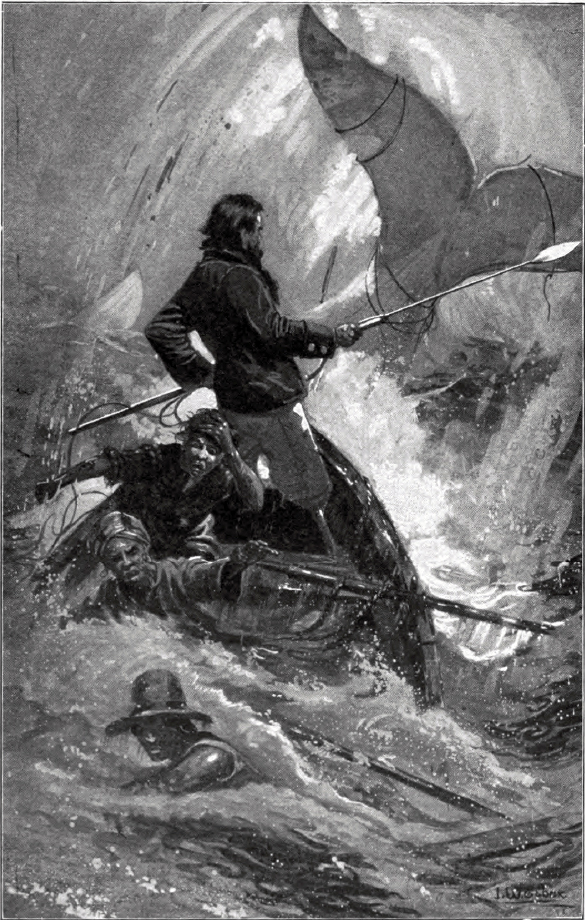
- Ahab in his final chase with Moby Dick, by I. W. Taber
- Created by: Herman Melville

In-universe information
- Nickname: Old Thunder
- Gender: Male
- Title: Captain
- Occupation: Sea captain
- Spouse: Unnamed wife
- Children: Unnamed son
- Religion: Quaker
- Nationality: American

Captain Ahab is a fictional character and one of the protagonists in Herman Melville's Moby-Dick (1851). He is the monomaniacal captain of the whaling ship Pequod. On a previous voyage, the white whale Moby Dick bit off Ahab's leg and he now wears a prosthetic leg made out of ivory. The whaling voyage of the Pequod ends up as a hunt for revenge on the whale, as Ahab forces the crew members to support his fanatical mission. When Moby Dick is finally sighted, Ahab's hatred robs him of all caution, and the whale drags him to his death beneath the sea and sinks the Pequod.

Melville biographer Andrew Delbanco calls Ahab "a brilliant personification of the very essence of fanaticism". Scholar F. O. Matthiessen calls attention to the fact that Ahab is called an "ungodly god-like man". Ahab's "tragedy is that of an unregenerate will" whose "burning mind is barred out from the exuberance of love" and argues that he "remains damned". Writer D. H. Lawrence felt little sympathy for Ahab and found that the whale should have "torn off both his legs, and a bit more besides".

The character of Ahab was created under the influence of Samuel Taylor Coleridge's lecture on Hamlet and figures in biblical and classical literature such as Shakespeare and Milton. His prosthesis, for instance, has been taken for an allusion to the Oedipus myth.

Ahab is firmly established in popular culture by cartoons, comic books, films and plays. Most famously, he provided J. M. Barrie with the model for his Captain Hook character, who is obsessed with not a whale but a crocodile.

== Biography ==
Ahab was named by his insane, widowed mother, who died when he was twelve months old. The etymology of the name Ahab derives from Hebrew, meaning "father's brother" as cited in Strong's Concordance no. 256, and his name is an auspicious allusion to the Biblical character of the same name, known for his wickedness and idolatry. At age 18, Ahab first took to sea as a harpooner. Less than three voyages prior to the start of the novel, Ahab married a young woman, with whom he had a young son.

Captain Peleg, one of the co-owners of the Pequod, sailed as mate with Ahab on a previous voyage in which a typhoon near Japan broke all three of her masts and flung them overboard. While the crew feared that the ship would sink, Ahab and Peleg instead concentrated on saving all hands and rigging temporary masts in order to reach the nearest port and make repairs.

Before the ship sails from Nantucket, Ishmael encounters a man named Elijah, who tells him about some of Ahab's past deeds. According to Elijah, Ahab once lay near death for three days and nights near Cape Horn, took part in a deadly battle against Spanish forces before an altar in Santa, and spat into its silver chalice. Ahab lost his leg during his most recent whaling voyage, leaving him with a grim disposition and a strong desire for revenge against Moby Dick.

In addition to the prosthetic leg, Ahab has a mark that runs down one side of his face and neck: "Threading its way out from among his grey hairs, and continuing right down one side of his tawny scorched face and neck, till it disappeared in his clothing, you saw a slender rod-like mark, lividly whitish. It resembled that perpendicular seam sometimes made in the straight, lofty trunk of a great tree, when the upper lightning tearingly darts down it, leaving the tree still greenly alive, but branded". –(Moby-Dick, p. 129.) The mark and its origins – whether a birthmark, the scar from a wound, or otherwise – are rarely mentioned or discussed. Ahab's leg includes a small flat patch that he uses as a slate for making navigational calculations. The deck planks of the Pequod have been bored with shallow holes, the same diameter as the lower end, to allow him to steady himself against the motion of the ship. While at sea, he turns to the ship's carpenter and blacksmith to fashion a replacement leg and fittings after damaging the one he wears.

Ahab is age 58 at the time of Pequod's last voyage. Peleg and Bildad pilot the ship out of the harbor, and Ahab first appears on deck when the ship is already at sea. Instead of embarking on a regular whaling voyage, Ahab declares he is out for revenge and nails a doubloon to the mast, as a reward for the crewmember who first sights Moby Dick. As the voyage proceeds, Ahab gradually abandons the physical comforts of his life, symbolized by such actions as throwing his pipe overboard and giving his shaving razors to the ship's blacksmith for use in forging a special harpoon he intends to use against Moby Dick. When the whale is eventually sighted, a disastrous three-day chase begins. Ahab throws his harpoon and hits Moby Dick, but its line wraps around his neck and drags him off his boat when the whale dives, drowning him.

Peleg refers to Ahab respectfully as a "grand, ungodly, god-like man", but he is also nicknamed "Old Thunder".

== Concept and creation ==
According to Melville biographer Leon Howard, "Ahab is a Shakespearean tragic hero, created according to the Coleridgean formula." The creation of Ahab, who apparently does not derive from any captain Melville sailed under, was heavily influenced by the observation in Samuel Taylor Coleridge's lecture on Hamlet that "one of Shakespeare's modes of creating characters is to conceive any one intellectual or moral faculty in morbid excess, and then to place himself ... thus mutilated or diseased, under given circumstances." Whenever Moby-Dick's narrator comments on Captain Ahab as an artistic creation, the language of Coleridge's lecture appears: "at all detract from him, dramatically regarded, if either by birth or other circumstances, he have what seems a half-wilful over-ruling morbidness at the bottom of his nature." All men "tragically great," Ishmael says, "are made so through a certain morbidness." All mortal greatness "is but disease."

Ahab's speech combines Quaker archaism with Shakespeare's idiom to serve as "a homegrown analogue to blank verse."

It has been speculated that Ahab may be based on Captain Charles Wilkes who commanded the United States Exploring Expedition. He was noted for being particularly cruel to his men; moreover, the Expedition is mentioned a few times throughout Moby-Dick.

Ahab's death seems to be based on an actual event. On May 18, 1843, Melville was aboard The Star, which sailed for Honolulu. Aboard were two sailors from the ship Nantucket, who could have told him that they had seen their second mate "taken out of a whaleboat by a foul line and drowned, as is Captain Ahab of Moby-Dick."

== Ahab allegorically regarded ==
Ahab's character is shaped by mythic and literary patterns that overlap and reinforce each other in such a complementary way that "the apparent irony of one allusion is frequently the truth of another." For instance, allusions to Oedipus, which flesh out Ahab's ignorance and lack of self-knowledge, are complemented by references to Narcissus, which evoke the psychological causes for his ignorance. Ahab's use of a spade for a crutch in Chapter 70, "The Sphinx," reminds the reader that he is lame, like Oedipus, and also wounded, like Prometheus. However, Ahab should be considered both in relation to the allusions and in contrast to the other characters.

=== King Ahab (Old Testament) ===
Ahab is named for the biblical story of Ahab in the Books of Kings 16:28–22:40, the evil idol-worshipping ruler. This association prompts Ishmael to ask, after first hearing Ahab's name: "When that wicked king was slain, the dogs, did they not lick his blood?" He is rebuked by one of Ahab's colleagues, who points out that "He did not name himself."

For Melville's allegory the single most important thing was that Ahab "did evil in the sight of the Lord above all that were before him" in 16:30–31. The biblical Ahab foreshadows the tragic end of Captain Ahab and the essential duality of his character. Both Ahabs are shrewd in their secular associations. The captain is successful in whaling, with a record of forty years. "The very evidence of this success," Nathalia Wright observes, "is fantastically like that in King Ahab's story: Captain Ahab, too, lives in an ivory house, 'the ivory Pequod' as it is often called, tricked out in trophies of whale bones and teeth from profitable voyages." The ship's last voyage, however, is not entirely commercial: from the moment Ahab attaches the golden doubloon on the mast, it becomes a pursuit of a perceived enemy, under a captain unable to compromise. King Ahab, an able politician but a patron of foreign gods, offended Jehovah (YHWH) by introducing Baal as a god. Jehovah tolerated no other gods and contrived with prophets to destroy King Ahab.

Like his eponym, Captain Ahab worships pagan gods, particularly the spirit of fire. Fedallah the Parsee, his harpooner, is a fire-worshipping Zoroastrian. Fedallah makes three prophecies regarding Ahab's death:

- That before he dies, he must see two hearses, one not made by human hands and one built from American wood
- That Fedallah will die before him and serve as his pilot into death
- That only hemp can kill him

Ahab interprets these prophecies to mean that he cannot die on land or sea, but they prove to be accurate if cryptic predictions of his death. Fedallah is swept off Ahab's whaleboat during the final three-day chase, and Ahab later sees his corpse bound to Moby Dick with a harpoon line. The whale proves to be the first of the two hearses; the Pequod becomes the second when it sinks with the loss of all hands aboard. The line around Ahab's neck serves as the fatal hemp, and Moby Dick's final dive allows Fedallah to lead Ahab to his death.

=== King Lear (Shakespeare) ===
Charles Olson mentions three modes of madness in King Lear, the King's, the Fool's, and Edgar's; as allegorized in Moby-Dick, Ahab takes the role of Lear, and Pip the roles of both the Fool and Edgar. Melville makes his points by way of contrasts to Shakespeare. Olson identifies the typhoon in chapter 119, "The Candles," with the storm in Lear. "Ahab, unlike Lear," Olson observes, "does not in this night of storm discover his love for his fellow wretches. On the contrary, this night Ahab uncovers his whole hate." Later, in chapter 125, "The Log and Line," Ahab says to Pip, in Lear's words to his Fool, "Thou touchest my inmost centre, boy; thou are tied to me by chords woven of my heart-strings." While Sweeney endorses Olson's identification, he finds exaggerated the claim that Ahab learns from his cabin-boy just as Lear does from the Fool. Ahab learns "little or nothing" throughout the book.

=== Satan (Milton) ===
Milton's Satan is "not the least element of which Captain Ahab is compounded," says Nathalia Wright. The words with which Ishmael and Starbuck portray him—infidel, impious, diabolic, blasphemous—describe him as a towering rebel.

In "The Candles" (Ch. 119) Ahab's harpoon is called a "fiery dart." The phrase is taken from book XII of John Milton's Paradise Lost, as Henry F. Pommer recognized, where Michael promised Adam "spiritual armour, able to resist/ Satan's assaults, and quench his fiery darts" (XII, 491-2). Pommer argues that Milton's work was more immediate than Shakespeare, because while some of Melville's soliloquies appear to find their prototypes in Shakespeare, "there is a slight step from dramatic monologue to fictional thought," and Milton "had already taken that step, using, in his own extended narrative, soliloquies precisely like Melville's."

Further allusions identify Ahab with Satan. Milton's scene set in Hell includes the lines "Their appetite with gust, instead of fruit/Chew'd bitter ashes, which the offended taste/With spattering noise rejected" (X, 565–567), and Moby-Dick chapter 132, "The Symphony," has "like a blighted fruit-tree he [Ahab] shook, and cast his last, cindered apple to the soil." On the last day of the chase, Ahab evokes the Creation: ""What a lovely day again! were it a new-made world, and made for a summerhouse to the angels, and this morning the first of its throwing open to them, a fairer day could not dawn upon that world." Later that day Moby Dick, "seemed combinedly possessed by all the angels that fell from heaven," sinks the ship. Tashtego hammers a sky-hawk to the mast: "And so the bird of heaven, with archangelic shrieks, and his imperial beak thrust upward, and his whole captive form folded in the flag of Ahab, went down with his ship, which, like Satan, would not sink to hell till she had dragged a living part of heaven with her, and helmeted herself with it." Pommer finds "most impressive of all" the Latin in chapter 113, "The Forge", with which Ahab cries: "Ego non baptizo te in nomine patris, sed in nomine diaboli." ("I baptize thee not in the name of the Father but in the name of the devil".)

Ahab's scar may have been modeled on the description of Satan's face, which "Deep scars of thunder had intrench'd." (I, 600–601)

The greatness and woe of both Satan and Ahab lies in pride. "The proud person," Pommer explains, "believing that he deserves treatment appropriate to his self-inflated dignity, is quick to anger when he receives a less welcome treatment. At the exaltation of the Messiah, Satan 'could not bear/Through pride that sight, and thought himself impair'd.'" Satan's "sense of injur'd merit" is reported in his first speech in Hell. Ahab's story, caused by Moby Dick biting off his leg, follows the same psychological pattern of being spiritually and physically impaired.

=== Prometheus (Aeschylus) ===
Overlapping with Lear, the typhoon scene in "The Candles" also seems to be Melville's recreation of the mythic theft of fire. Prometheus accomplished his theft by the stealthy hiding of the divine spark in a fennel stalk. In contrast, "Ahab's theft is a boldly defiant deed, set amidst elemental nature in furious eruption." The whole business of whaling is a theft of fire, for the sperm whale's oil is used as fuel for flames. The hunt for the White Whale, described by Ishmael as "the fiery hunt," thus represents a conflict with a deity—hence the references to Moby Dick as a god. Ahab waving the fiery harpoon is Melville's "modified equivalent of Prometheus's smuggling from heaven the fire-laden fennel stalk." Both Prometheus and Ahab try to alter or reverse "the supernatural design, and herein lies the acme of their tragic hubris." Prometheus, mistakenly convinced that Zeus planned the destruction of man, stole fire in order to contravene the will of the god; Ahab, thinking his mind can penetrate the mystery of evil, is convinced that killing Moby Dick will "expel evil from the cosmos."

In a tragedy a hero has a mad counterpart: Prometheus has Io, Moby-Dick has Pip. The madness of Io and Pip is caused by their unintentional contact with the primal elements or with the deity. "The Pip who dances and shakes his tambourine before Queequeg's coffin," Sweeney compares, "is clearly a maniac, completely detached from his former personality." Likewise, Io, tortured by the gadfly, "bursts upon the stage in a wild dance...While on the stage, Io speaks with a disjointed frenzy much the same as Pip's."

=== Oedipus (Sophocles) ===
In "The Candles," Ahab is temporarily stricken by blindness, an allusion to the Oedipus myth. In the chapter "The Sphynx," Ahab stands before a sperm whale's head hanging from the side of his ship: "it seemed the Sphynx's in the desert." Ahab orders the head to "tell us the secret thing that is in thee." Here Ahab resembles Oedipus and the monster of Thebes, the more for his using a spade alternatively as both a crutch and as a tool with which to dissect the whale. Oedipus' staff, Sweeney notes, is both "a walking tool and the murder weapon with which he killed his father." The Promethean and Oedipean sides of Ahab connect in this chapter by way of the crutch. In addition to this, blindness is alluded to. Oedipus and Ahab are intelligent and ignorant at the same time, excessively proud, and both face a riddle (the mystery of evil).

=== Narcissus (Ovid) ===
The opening chapter contains an extended allusion to "that story of Narcissus, who because he could not grasp the tormenting, mild image he saw in the fountain, plunged into it and was drowned" (Ch. 1, "Loomings"). Ahab does not realize that the malice he sees in the White Whale is his own, "wildly projected." His Narcissistic self-delusion (he is unaware that he sees himself in the whale) complements "his Oedipean self-ignorance" (he does not know who he really is). The Narcissus myth also explains why Ahab, unlike Oedipus, remains self-ignorant. While two messengers enlight Oedipus and separate him from his obsession, Narcissus and Ahab are never interrupted from theirs. The contrast between Narcissus and Ahab is that the first contemplates a beautiful image which he loves, while Ahab projects an evil image which he hates, which Sweeney calls "an ironic reversal on Melville's part." In several ways Ahab and Moby Dick resemble each other:

- both are described with images of royalty, divinity, and archeology.
- both share physical features, they are scarred or wounded, and each has a prominent brow or forehead.
- both share the same internal characteristics: isolated, stubborn, vengeful, quickly enraged.
- Finally, both are "ultimately unknowable." According to Ishmael in "The Nut," all things that are mighty wear "a false brow to the common world." Ahab hates the mask as much as he does the thing itself.

==== Fedallah as Echo ====
A subtle connection between Ahab, Moby Dick and Fedallah is formed by the imagery of the brow and forehead. According to Sweeney, Fedallah is "clearly an external projection of Ahab's own depravity" and at the same time a double of what Ahab finds most evil in the whale. Fedallah is several times described using "phantom" imagery in the chapter "Ahab's Boat and Crew. Fedallah." In Ovid's myth Narcissus has an airy counterpart in the speech-deprived nymph Echo, who can only repeat the sounds she hears. Echo is an auditory complement to the visual reflection and a foreshadowing of Narcissus' death. In the same way Fedallah, who only says what Ahab wants to hear, is an auditory reflection of Ahab's evil, of which Moby Dick is the visual reflection. Fedallah foreshadows Ahab's death.

== Reception ==
=== Critical ===
When the book was first published, reviewers mostly focused on Ahab and the whale. According to George Ripley in Harper's New Monthly Magazine for December 1851, Ahab "becomes the victim of a deep, cunning monomania; believes himself predestined to take a bloody revenge on his fearful enemy; pursues him with fierce demoniac energy of purpose." Ripley admires the creation of Ahab, who "opens upon us with wonderful power. He exercises a wild, bewildering fascination by his dark and mysterious nature."

During the onset of Melville's rediscovery there was no change of emphasis on Ahab and his struggle with the whale. During the 1950s and 1960s literary scholars shifted their attention to narrative technique and point of view, which for Melville studies meant that the spotlight switched from Ahab to Ishmael.

== In popular culture ==
=== Books ===
There have been a number of works that have reimagined Ahab's story and his early life, including:

- Ahab's Return: or, The Last Voyage (2018) by Jeffrey Ford, in which Captain Ahab returns to the mainland to discover that he has been declared dead thanks to a notorious fiction called Moby-Dick and that his wife and son have left Nantucket for New York, leaving Ahab on a desperate quest to reunite with them.
- Ahab's Bride: The Legacy of Ahab: Book One (2021) by Louise M. Gouge, telling of Ahab's romance with Hannah Oldweiler, who would become his wife.
- Ahab, a Love Story (2023) by Stephen Melillo, reimagining Ahab's early life.
- Ahab's Wife or, The Star-Gazer (1999) by Sena Jeter Naslund, imagining the life of Ahab's wife

=== Films, television and video ===
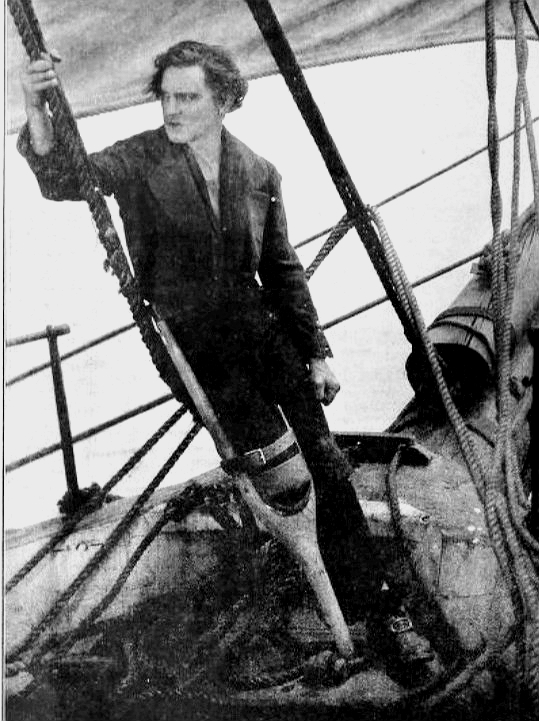
John Barrymore as Ahab Ceeley in The Sea Beast

The first two film adaptations show "the radical surgery that Hollywood performed on Herman Melville's masterpiece." The first was a 1926 silent movie, The Sea Beast, a romantic love story in which the character of Ahab (John Barrymore) is transformed into "a handsome young sailor", a New Bedford harpooner who has little in common with Ahab, not even his full name, which is extended to Ahab Ceeley. Though, in the book, Ahab has already lost his leg, in the film, a "crude papier mache monster" bites it off. When the movie opened on Broadway, it made $20,000 a week and ran longer than any Warner film up to that time.

Barrymore is also Ahab in the 1930 Moby Dick. Ahab is "shrieking in pain" as the ship's (called Mary-Ann) blacksmith holds a fiery, hot-bladed tool against his stump. Again, the whale is just a means to separate lovers. In another divergence from the book, Ahab's sweetheart is the daughter of Father Mapple. Once again, it became a hit at the box office.

In 1955, Orson Welles played Ahab in a filmed production of his play Moby Dick Rehearsed; however, this film is considered "lost".

Warner Brothers' third adaptation was directed in 1956 by John Huston, with a screenplay by Ray Bradbury, the first serious attempt to follow the book. Completion of the script took a year, filming another year, and editing and scoring a third year. Gregory Peck's Ahab is a "stern authoritarian Lincoln in black." The otherwise positive reviews agreed that Peck was unsuited for the part.

There have been two French film versions of Moby-Dick: Capitaine Achab (2004), starring Frédéric Bonpart and Capitaine Achabin (2007) starring Denis Lavant.

Ahab has been portrayed on television, beginning with Victor Jory's portrayal in 1954 on the Hallmark Hall of Fame and including portrayals by Patrick Stewart in the 1998 mini-series and William Hurt in the 2011 mini-series. In films that were released directly to video, Captain Ahab was played by Barry Bostwick in a 2010 modern re-imagining of Moby Dick, and by Danny Glover in the 2011 film Age of the Dragons, a fantasy-themed re-imagining.

In Star Trek II: The Wrath of Khan (1982), Khan's pursuit of Captain Kirk focuses on the theme of vengeance, and The Wrath of Khan borrows heavily from Moby-Dick. To make the parallels clear, there is a copy of Moby-Dick in Khan's dwelling. Khan liberally paraphrases Ahab, with "I'll chase him round the moons of Nibia and round the Antares maelstrom and round perdition's flames before I give him up!". Khan quotes Ahab's tirade at the end of the novel verbatim with his final lines: "To the last I grapple with thee; from Hell's heart I stab at thee; for hate's sake, I spit my last breath at thee."

In the 2008 video game Fallout 3, an interaction with one of the Brotherhood Outcasts at Fort Independence involves them referring to the Brotherhood of Steel's leader, Owyn Lyons, by the derogatory "Ahab Lyons" and remarking that he has lost sight of his order's mission by "chasing his Super Mutant white whale." The player character can pass a levelled skill check to deepen the reference to Ahab by suggesting Lyons' quest will get him killed; the Outcast member will express surprise that they know the analogy's origins.

In the light novel series Fate/strange Fake and its later manga and anime adaptations, Ahab appears as "The Captain" as one of the manifestations of the Watcher, an entity that floats high above the ground and relays information to their master, and whose real form in turn resembles an ethereal Moby Dick.

Captain Ahab: The Story of Dave Stieb is a 2022 four-part sports documentary by Secret Base's Jon Bois and Alex Rubenstein, about Dave Stieb, a baseball pitcher, whose pursuit of a no-hitter is likened to Ahab chasing the white whale. Stieb, who was not involved in the documentary's production, also noted the similarity.

In the 2023 South Korean indie gacha game Limbus Company, Captain Ahab is a major antagonist in the fifth chapter, or "canto" of the game. One of the 12 main playable characters, Ishmael, gains an obsession with hunting down and killing Ahab. Ahab is portrayed as being blindly focused on and obsessed with killing the Pallid Whale, disregarding anyone or anything else to achieve her goal.

=== Comic books ===
An acclaimed version of Moby-Dick and Ahab was made by the trio of Argentine artists consisting of Enrique Breccia, Leopoldo Durañona and Guillermo Saccomanno, which was released in a completed and collected graphic novel format in 1979.

=== Music ===
The second song on Leviathan, a Moby-Dick-based concept album by the American rock band Mastodon, is called "I am Ahab".

== Sources ==
- Barbour, James. (1986). "Melville Biography: A Life and the Lives." A Companion to Melville Studies. Ed. John Bryant. New York, Westport, London: Greenwood Press.
- Delbanco, Andrew. (2005). Melville: His World and Work. New York: Alfred A. Knopf. ISBN 9780375403149
- Heflin, Wilson. (2004). Herman Melville's Whaling Years. Eds. Mary K. Bercaw Edwards and Thomas Farel Heffernan. Nashville: Vanderbilt University Press.
- Howard, Leon. (1940). "Melville's Struggle with the Angel." Modern Language Quarterly, June 1940. Reprinted in Hershel Parker (ed.), The Recognition of Herman Melville. Selected Criticism since 1846. Ann Arbor: University of Michigan Press 1967, Paperback printing 1970.
- Inge, M. Thomas. (1986). "Melville in Popular Culture." A Companion to Melville Studies. Ed. John Bryant. New York, Westport, Connecticut, London: Greenwood Press.
- Lawrence, D.H. (1923). Studies in Classic American Literature. Reprinted London: Penguin Books. ISBN 9780140183771
- Lee, A. Robert (ed.). (2001). Herman Melville: Critical Assessments. Volume I. The Banks, East Sussex: Helm Information.
- Mansfield, Luther S. and Howard P. Vincent. (1952). "Introduction" and "Explanatory Notes". Herman Melville, Moby-Dick; or, The Whale. Eds. Luther S. Mansfield and Howard P. Vincent. New York: Hendricks House. HathiTrust online free access
- Matthiessen, F.O. (1941). American Renaissance: Art and Expression in the Age of Emerson and Whitman. Tenth Printing 1966, New York, London and Toronto: Oxford University Press.
- Milder, Robert. (1988). "Herman Melville." Columbia Literary History of the United States. Gen. Ed. Emory Elliott. New York: Columbia University Press. ISBN 0-231-05812-8
- Olson, Charles (1938). "Lear and Moby Dick". Twice a Year. 1: 165–89. Reprinted in Brian Higgins and Hershel Parker (eds.), Critical Essays on Herman Melville's Moby-Dick. New York & Toronto: G.K. Hall & Co., and Maxwell Macmillan Canada, 1992.
- Olson, Charles (1947). Call Me Ishmael. Reprint: City Lights Books, San Francisco, 1958. Internet Archive
- Pommer, Henry F. (1950). Milton and Melville. University of Pittsburgh Press.
- Sealts Jr., Merton M. (1997), "Whose Book is Moby-Dick?", in Bryant, John; Milder, Robert (eds.), Melville's Evermoving Dawn: Centennial Essays, Kent, Ohio, London: The Kent State University Press, ISBN 9780873385626.
- Stone, Edward. (1975). "Ahab Gets Girl, or Herman Melville Goes to the Movies." Reprinted: The Critical Response to Herman Melville's Moby-Dick. Ed. Kevin J. Hayes. Westport, Connecticut and London: Greenwood Press, 1994.
- Sweeney, Gerard M. (1975). Melville's Use of Classical Mythology. Amsterdam: Rodopi N.V.
- Tanselle, G. Thomas. (1988). "Historical Note Section VI". Herman Melville, Moby-Dick; or, The Whale. The Writings of Herman Melville Volume Six. Eds. Harrison Hayford, Hershel Parker, G. Thomas Tanselle. Evanston and Chicago: Northwestern University and the Newberry Library.
- Williams, David Park. (1965)."Hook and Ahab: Barrie's Strange Satire on Melville." PMLA, December 1965. Retrieved 25 March 2014.
- Wilson, A.N. (2008). "Moby-Dick – a modern tragedy." The Telegraph, 27 October 2008. Retrieved 25 March 2014.
- Wright, Nathalia. (1949). Melville's Use of the Bible. Durham, North Carolina: Duke University Press.Internet Archive free Online.
