= Pequod (Moby-Dick) =

Fictional ship from the novel Moby-Dick

- Moby-Dick vehicle
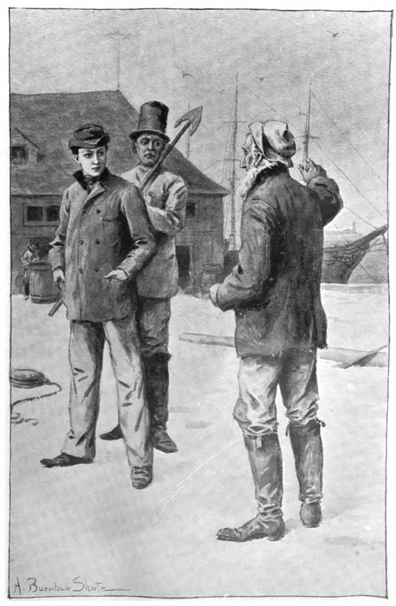
- Elijah points out the Pequod to Ishmael and Queequeg
- Captain: Captain Ahab

General characteristics
- Type: Whaling ship

The Pequod is a fictional 19th-century Nantucket whaling ship that appears in the 1851 novel Moby-Dick by American author Herman Melville. Pequod and her crew, commanded by Captain Ahab, are central to the story, which, after the initial chapters, takes place almost entirely aboard the ship during a three-year whaling expedition in the Atlantic, Indian and South Pacific oceans. Most of the characters in the novel are part of Pequod's crew.

Ishmael, the novel's narrator, encounters the ship after he arrives in Nantucket and learns of three ships that are about to leave on three-year cruises. Tasked by his new friend, the Polynesian harpooneer Queequeg (or more precisely, Queequeg's idol-god, Yojo), to make the selection for them both, Ishmael, a self-described "green hand at whaling", goes to the Straight Wharf and chooses the Pequod.

== Name ==
Ishmael says that Pequod was named for the Algonquian-speaking Pequot tribe of Native Americans. Melville knew of the tribe's history, that it was decimated and scattered in the early 1600s by the Pequot War and by the epidemic that preceded it. The Mashantucket Pequot Tribe (Western Pequot tribe) and the Eastern Pequot Tribal Nation still inhabit their reservation in Connecticut.

Melville referred to the Pequot in other works, as well. Oshima Yukiko points to other symbolic references to the tribe in the novel and says that, in the final scene, Moby Dick's destruction of the Pequod reflects the destruction of the Pequot people. The name also evokes Biblical meanings; in Jeremiah 50:21, Babylon is referred to as Pekod ("Punishment").

== Description ==
Pequod has endured the years and the elements, but not without sustaining damage. The ship has a quarterdeck and a forecastle and is three-masted like most Nantucket whalers of the time, but all three masts are replacements, taken on when the originals were lost in a typhoon off Japan.

Pequod is not unlike Ahab in this respect, since many of the rest of these missing elements have been replaced by the bones of the whales she hunts. She is not a new vessel, and with age would usually come some veneration and respect, which Ishmael tries to convey by using several historical references in his description of her. But in Pequod's case this has been negated by the thick veneer of barbarity that has been overlaid onto the ship in the form of fantastic scrimshaw embellishment. Far from enjoying mere utilitarian replacements out of available whalebone, she has been ornately decorated, even to the whale teeth set into the railing that now resemble an open jaw. Like a fingerbone necklace on a cannibal, these adornments are clear evidence of Pequod's success as a hunter and killer of whales.

...a rare old craft... [...]

She was a ship of the old school, rather small if anything; with an old fashioned claw-footed look about her. Long seasoned and weather-stained in the typhoons and calms of all four oceans, her old hull's complexion was darkened like a French grenadier's, who has alike fought in Egypt and Siberia. Her venerable bows looked bearded. Her masts... stood stiffly up like the spines of the three old kings of Cologne. Her ancient decks were worn and wrinkled, like the pilgrim-worshipped flag-stone in Canterbury Cathedral where Beckett bled. But to all these her old antiquities, were added new and marvellous features, pertaining to the wild business that for more than half a century she had followed... [...]

She was apparelled like any barbaric Ethiopian emperor, his neck heavy with pendants of polished ivory. She was a thing of trophies. A cannibal of a craft, tricking herself forth in the chased bones of her enemies. All round, her unpanelled, open bulwarks were garnished like one continuous jaw, with the long sharp teeth of the sperm whale, inserted there for pins, to fasten her old hempen thews and tendons to. Those thews ran not through base blocks of land wood, but deftly travelled over sheaves of sea-ivory. Scorning a turnstile wheel at her reverend helm, she sported there a tiller; and that tiller was in one mass, curiously carved from the long narrow lower jaw of her hereditary foe...A noble craft, but somehow a most melancholy! All noble things are touched with that.

— Moby-Dick, Ch. 16

The principal owners of the vessel are two well-to-do Quaker retired whaling captains, therefore "the other and more inconsiderable and scattered owners, left nearly the whole management of the ship's affairs to these two."

Captain Bildad, who along with Captain Peleg was one of the largest owners of the vessel; the other shares, as is sometimes the case in these ports, being held by a crowd of old annuitants; widows, fatherless children, and chancery wards; each owning about the value of a timber head, or a foot of plank, or a nail or two in the ship. People in Nantucket invest their money in whaling vessels, the same way that you do yours in approved state stocks bringing in good interest..

— Moby-Dick, Ch. 16

Peleg served as first mate under Ahab on the Pequod before obtaining his own command, and is responsible for all her whalebone embellishments.

...during the term of his chief-mateship, [he] had built upon her original grotesqueness, and inlaid it, all over, with a quaintness both of material and device, unmatched by anything except it be Thorkill-Hake's carved buckler or bedstead...

— Moby-Dick, Ch. 16

== Symbolic significance ==
Scholars have seen the Pequod and its crew as symbolic but have disagreed on the specifics. The racial diversity of the ship's crew has been taken to reflect the ideal of the American racial community. Its thirty-member crew equals the number of American states at the time, and, in the words of Andrew Delbanco, the Pequod "becomes a replica of the American ship of state." Some agree in seeing the ship as an "assemblage," that is a group that stands for a larger group, while others have challenged the "well-known" interpretation.

== Cultural references ==
- Petuch, Brian (2020), The Pequod, UCLA Contemporary Music Score Collection
- Di Paolo, Rosella (2020). "Pequod Speaks". World Literature Today. 94: 50.
- "PEQUOD" is an acronym for "Pacific Equatorial Ocean Dynamics" project
- In Metal Gear Solid V: The Phantom Pain, the support helicopter is named 'Pequod' after the vessel in Moby-Dick
- In the videogame Limbus Company by Studio Project Moon, The Pequod Whaling Ship and some characters from Moby-Dick (Pip, Starbuck, Stubb, Ishmael (portrayed as female), Queequeg (portrayed as female) and the Pequod Captain Ahab (portrayed as female)) appear in the game's 5th chapter

== Citations ==
=== Sources ===
- Berkaw Edwards, Mary K. (2001), "Pequod", Encyclopedia of American Literature of the Sea and Great Lakes., ABC-CLIO, p. 348, ISBN 978-0313301483
- Braude, William G. (1962). "23. Melville's Moby Dick". The Explicator. 21 (3): 41–43. doi:10.1080/00144940.1962.11482319.
- Delbanco, Andrew (2005). Melville, His World and Work. New York: Knopf. ISBN 978-0-375-40314-9. OCLC 845847813.
- Erthel, Thomas (2016). "The Common Continent of Men"? Die Pequod Und Ihre Crew Als Verhandlungsraum Von 'Welt' in Melvilles Moby-Dick; or, the Whale". Arcadia. 51 (2): 308–324. doi:10.1515/arcadia-2016-0025. S2CID 191882621.
- Hart, James D. (1986), "Pequod", The Concise Oxford Companion to American Literature, Oxford University Press, ISBN 9780195047714
- Heflin, Wilson. (2004). 'Herman Melville's Whaling Years Edited by Mary K. Bercaw Edwards and Thomas Farel Heffernan. Nashville: Vanderbilt University Press.
- Kado, Martina (2018). "The Ship as Assemblage: Melville's Literary Shipboard Geographies". Atlantic Studies. 15 (1): 40–61. doi:10.1080/14788810.2017.1347380. S2CID 148721482.
- Oshima, Yukiko (2013), "Herman Melville's "Pequot Trilogy": The Pequot War in Moby-Dick, Israel Potter, and Clarel" (PDF), The Japanese Journal of American Studies
- ——— (2001), "The Red Flag of the Pequod/Pequot", Melville Among the Nations, Kent State University Press, ISBN 0873386965
- Robertson-Lorant, Laurie (2003). "Red Blood, White Bones the Native American Presence in Moby-Dick". Comparative American Studies. 1 (3): 379–390. doi:10.1177/14775700030013008. S2CID 161104626.
