= List of Moby-Dick characters =

Moby-Dick (1851) is a novel by Herman Melville. While some characters only appear in the shore-based chapters at the beginning of the book, and others are captains and crewmembers of other ships, the majority of the characters are officers or crewmembers of the whaling ship Pequod.

== Ishmael ==
Ishmael is the narrator of the book. He recounts the whaling voyage led by Captain Ahab while also explaining the history and mechanics of whaling and attempting to promote the nobility of the trade. He primarily observes the major events of the novel as opposed to being an active participant in them. In the epilogue, it is revealed that Ishmael was the only survivor of the sinking of the Pequod. The name Ishmael has come to symbolize orphans, exiles, and social outcasts in reference to the biblical character from which his name is taken.

== Captain Ahab ==
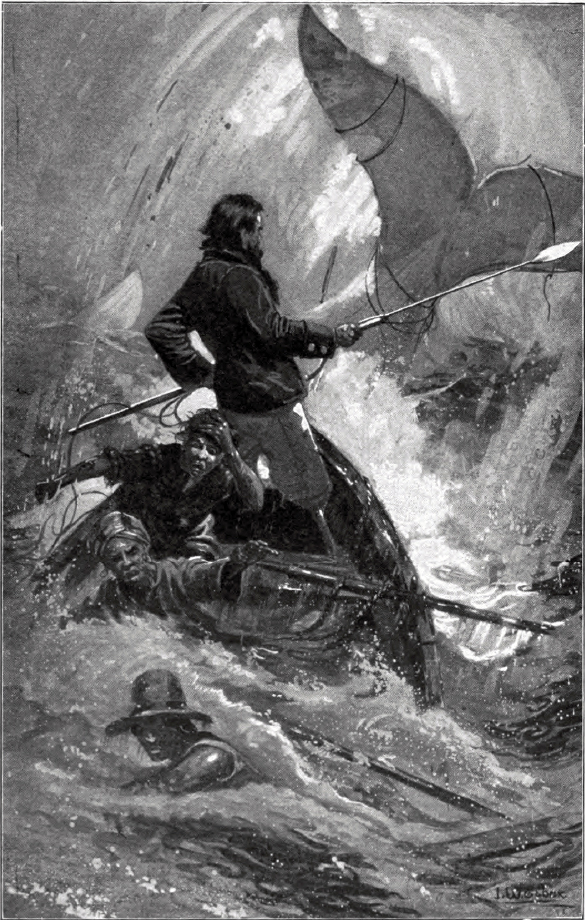
Ahab facing Moby Dick

Captain Ahab is the tyrannical captain of Pequod. Prior to the events of the novel, Captain Ahab lost his leg while hunting Moby Dick, leading to a monomaniacal desire in Ahab to kill the "White Whale". It is his obsession with Moby Dick that dooms Pequod and her crew, with Ishmael as the sole survivor. Following his introduction, Ahab overtakes Ishmael as the central figure of the book. He is the main protagonist of the novel.

== Moby Dick ==
The title character is a giant, largely white bull sperm whale and arguably the main antagonist of the novel.

== Ashore ==
=== Father Mapple ===
A former whaler who is a preacher in the New Bedford Whaleman's Chapel.

=== Elijah ===
The character Elijah (named for the Biblical prophet Elijah), on learning that Ishmael and Queequeg have signed onto Ahab's ship, asks, "Anything down there about your souls?" When Ishmael reacts with surprise, Elijah continues:

"Oh, perhaps you hav'n't got any," he said quickly. "No matter though, I know many chaps that hav'n't got any — good luck to 'em; and they are all the better off for it. A soul's a sort of a fifth wheel to a wagon."

— Moby-Dick, Ch. 19

Later in the conversation, Elijah adds:

Well, well, what's signed, is signed; and what's to be, will be; and then again, perhaps it wont be, after all. Any how, it's all fixed and arranged a'ready; and some sailors or other must go with him, I suppose; as well these as any other men, God pity 'em! Morning to ye, shipmates, morning; the ineffable heavens bless ye; I'm sorry I stopped ye.

— Moby-Dick, Ch. 19

=== Captain Bildad and Captain Peleg ===
The principal owners of the Pequod, two well-to-do Quaker retired whaling captains. Both have names taken from the Bible: Peleg and Bildad. Peleg served as first mate under Ahab on the Pequod before obtaining his own command, and is responsible for all her whalebone embellishment.

=== Captain Bildad's sister, Charity ===
She comes aboard the Pequod before it sails with various things she deems necessary, such as a hymnal laid on each sailor's bunk.

== Crew of the Pequod ==
The crew is international. In chapter 40, "Midnight, Forecastle," a partial list of the speakers includes sailors from the Isle of Man, France, Iceland, the Netherlands, the Azores, Sicily, Malta, China, Chile, Denmark, India, England, Spain, and Ireland.

Although in fact 44 members of the crew are mentioned, in the final chapters Melville writes three times that there are 30 crewmembers. Since there were thirty states in the union at the time, it has been suggested that, in its diversity, the Pequod was a metaphor for the 'American ship of state'.

=== Mates ===
The three mates of the Pequod are all from New England, specifically Massachusetts.

==== Starbuck ====
The young chief mate. A thoughtful and intellectual Quaker from Nantucket. He is married and has a son. Such is his desire to return to them that, when nearly reaching the last leg of their quest for Moby Dick, he considers arresting or even killing Ahab with a loaded musket, and turning the ship back for home. Starbuck is alone among the crew in objecting to Ahab's quest, declaring it madness to want revenge on an animal, which lacks reason; such a desire is blasphemous to his Quaker religion. Starbuck advocates continuing the more mundane pursuit of whales for their oil. But he lacks the support of the crew in his opposition to Ahab, and is unable to persuade them to turn back. Despite his misgivings, he feels himself bound by his obligations to obey the captain. Starbuck was an important Quaker family name on Nantucket, and there were dozens of actual whalemen of this period named Starbuck, as evidenced by the name of Starbuck Island in the South Pacific whaling grounds.

==== Stubb ====
The second mate. From Cape Cod, always seems to have a pipe in his mouth and a smile on his face. "Good-humored, easy, and careless, he presided over his whaleboat as if the most deadly encounter were but a dinner, and his crew all invited guests" (Moby-Dick, Ch. 27). Although he is not an educated man, Stubb is remarkably articulate, and during whale hunts keeps up an imaginative patter reminiscent of that of some characters in Shakespeare. Scholarly portrayals range from that of an optimistic simpleton to a paragon of lived philosophic wisdom.

==== Flask ====
The third mate. A short, stout man hailing from Martha's Vineyard, he approaches the practice of whaling as if trying to avenge some deep offense the whales have done him. Flask is nicknamed "King-Post" by the crew, as his physical stature reminds them of this short, strong timber that is often used to brace ships and structures.

=== Harpooneers ===
The harpooneers of the Pequod are non-Christians from various parts of the world. Each serves on a mate's boat.

==== Queequeg ====
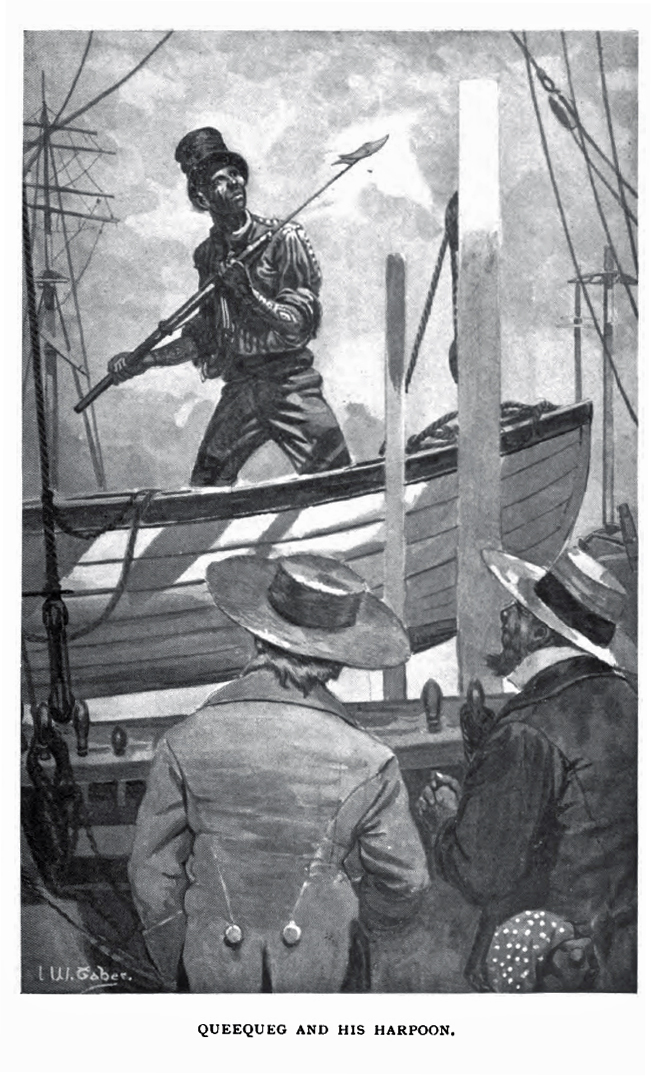
Queequeg

Hails from the fictional island of Rokovoko in the South Seas, inhabited by a cannibal tribe, and is the son of the chief of his tribe. He is an extremely skillful harpooneer and a strong swimmer. He and Ishmael bond early in the novel, when they share a bed before leaving for Nantucket. He is described as existing in a state between 'civilized' and 'savage', with his extensive tattoos at first frightening and then fascinating Ishmael. Queequeg is the harpooneer on Starbuck's boat, where Ishmael is also an oarsman. Queequeg and Ishmael are deeply intimate at the beginning of the novel (with Queequeg going so far in Chapter 10 as to declare the two of them 'married'), but they are separated on board the Pequod, with Ishmael working before the mast as a common sailor and Queequeg keeping a more privileged position aft.

==== Tashtego ====
A Gay Head (Wampanoag) Native American harpooneer. The personification of the hunter, he turns from hunting land animals to hunting whales. Tashtego is the harpooneer on Stubb's boat.

==== Daggoo ====
A tall (6' 5") West African harpooneer with a noble, graceful bearing. He is the harpooneer on Flask's boat. His height and placid demeanor contrast humorously with Flask's short stature and irascibility.

==== Fedallah ====
Harpooneer on Ahab's boat. He is of Indian Zoroastrian ("Parsee") descent, and is described as having lived in China. When the Pequod sets sail, Fedallah is hidden on board with the crew of Ahab's boat; he emerges only when the boats are first lowered to pursue a whale. Fedallah is referred to in the text as Ahab's "Dark Shadow." Ishmael calls him a "fire worshipper" and the crew speculates that he is a devil in man's disguise. He is the source of a variety of prophecies regarding Ahab and his hunt for Moby Dick, including one about the manner of Ahab's death: "Hemp only can kill thee." This prophecy later comes true in the final chapter, when a harpoon rope wraps around Ahab's neck and drags him into the sea, leading to his death by drowning.

=== Pip ===
Nicknamed "Pippin", but "Pip" for short, an African-American youth said to be from Tolland County, Connecticut, although he is referred to as "Alabama Boy". He is "the most insignificant of the Pequod's crew". Because he is physically slight, he is made a ship-keeper (a sailor who stays aboard the ship while its whaleboats go out). Ishmael contrasts him with the "dull and torpid in his intellects" — and paler and much older — steward Dough-Boy, describing Pip as "over tender-hearted" but "at bottom very bright, with that pleasant, genial, jolly brightness peculiar to his tribe". Ishmael goes so far as to chastise the reader: "Nor smile so, while I write that this little black was brilliant, for even blackness has its brilliancy; behold yon lustrous ebony, paneled in king's cabinets".

The after-oarsman on Stubb's boat is injured, however, so Pip is temporarily reassigned to Stubb's whaleboat crew. The first time out, Pip jumps from the boat, causing Stubb and Tashtego to lose their already-harpooned whale. Tashtego and the rest of the crew are furious; Stubb chides him "officially" and "unofficially", even raising the specter of slavery: "A whale would sell for thirty times what you would, Pip, in Alabama". The next time a whale is sighted, Pip again jumps overboard and is left stranded in the "awful lonesomeness" of the sea while Stubb's and the others' boats are dragged along by their harpooned whales. By the time he is rescued, he has become (at least to the other sailors) "an idiot", "mad". Ishmael, however, thought Pip had a mystical experience: "So man's insanity is heaven's sense". Pip and his experience are crucial because they serve as foreshadowing, in Ishmael's words, "providing the sometimes madly merry and predestinated craft with a living and ever accompanying prophecy of whatever shattered sequel might prove her own". Pip's madness is full of poetry and eloquence; he is reminiscent of Tom in King Lear. Ahab later sympathizes with Pip and takes the young boy under his wing.

=== Bulkington ===
Bulkington is a handsome, popular mariner whom Ishmael encounters briefly at the Spouter Inn in New Bedford (Chapter 3), when he has just returned from a four-year-long voyage. Later, Ishmael finds that he is also a member of the crew of the Pequod. He is the subject of Chapter 23, "The Lee Shore", but does not appear in the rest of the novel.

=== Others ===
==== Dough Boy ====
The pale, nervous steward of the ship.

==== Fleece ====
The ship's cook. A very old, half-deaf African-American with bad knees, he is presented in the chapter "Stubb's Supper" at some length. Stubb good-humoredly takes him to task on how to prepare a variety of dishes from the whale's carcass, then has him preach an admonishing sermon to the sharks gorging themselves on its blubber.

==== Perth ====
The ship's blacksmith. Ahab has Perth forge a special harpoon that he carries into the final confrontation with Moby Dick. Perth is one of the few characters whose previous life is described in much detail: his life ashore has been ruined by alcoholism.

==== The Carpenter ====
The unnamed ship's carpenter, responsible for repairs to boats and other equipment. After Ahab's prosthetic leg is damaged, he has the carpenter fashion a replacement from the sections of whalebone in storage, then calls on Perth to forge a set of fittings for it.

==== The Manxman ====
Oldest member of the crew. He is "popularly invested with preternatural powers of discernment", has "studied signs", and is given to dark prophecies. His age and origin on the Isle of Man are the subject of one of Ahab's commentaries on the nature of man in Chapter 125, "The Log and Line".

== Others met at sea ==
=== Captain Boomer ===
Boomer commands the Samuel Enderby of London, one of the ships that Ahab encounters at sea. He has not only seen Moby Dick recently, but lost his arm to him in a previous attack. Like Ahab, he has replaced the missing limb with a prosthesis made of sperm whale bone, in his case a mallet. Ahab immediately assumes he has found a kindred spirit in his thirst for vengeance, but Boomer is yet another representation of the duality to be found throughout the novel; in this instance, a sane and rational counterpart to Ahab. While Boomer also anthropomorphizes Moby Dick, describing the "boiling rage" the whale seemed to be in when Boomer attempted to capture him, he has easily come to terms with losing his arm, and harbors no ill-will against Moby Dick, advising Ahab to abandon the pursuit. The Enderby's doctor provides solid reasoning for this attitude, informing the gathering:

Do you know, gentlemen, that the digestive organs of the whale are so inscrutably constructed by Divine Providence, that it is quite impossible for him to completely digest even a man's arm? And he knows it too. So that what you take for the White Whale's malice is only his awkwardness. For he never means to swallow a single limb; he only thinks to terrify by feints.

— Moby-Dick, Ch. 100

Boomer jokingly tells a long yarn about the loss of his arm; this attitude, coupled with a lack of urgency in telling where he sighted Moby Dick, infuriates Ahab, leading Boomer to query, "Is your captain crazy?" Ahab immediately quits the Enderby and is so hasty in his return to the Pequod that he cracks and splinters his whalebone leg, then further damages it in admonishing the helmsman. While appearing to be whole, the leg is badly damaged and cannot be trusted; it now serves as metaphor for its wearer.

=== Derick de Deer ===
Derick de Deer is a German captain in command of the whaling ship Jungfrau (Virgin). Melville disparages the whaling prowess of both de Deer and Germans generally. De Deer's ship has succeeded in capturing no whales, so he begs the Pequod's crew for oil for the ship's lamps. During this transaction, whales are sighted and the crews of both boats pursue, de Deer trying (unsuccessfully) to hinder the rival crews. De Deer is last seen pursuing a fin whale, according to Melville too swift a swimmer to be captured by 19th-century whalers.

=== Other whaling captains ===
The Pequod encounters a number of other whaling ships in the course of her voyage. The captains are not named, but some play significant minor roles:

- Bachelor: his ship fully laden after a successful cruise, the captain angers Ahab by refusing to believe in Moby Dick's existence, reinforcing the ambiguity between the whale's real and mythical characteristics.
- Bouton de Rose (Rosebud): the captain of this French ship is also disparaged, being described as a "cologne manufacturer". He has captured two already-dead whales whose blubber and oil will be of little value. However, Stubb suspects that they may contain valuable ambergris, and tricks the captain and his crew into releasing the whales. He is proven correct, but recovers only a portion of the material from one carcass before Ahab summons him back to the Pequod.
- Rachel: Captain Gardiner wishes Ahab to help him seek a missing whaleboat in which his son was a crew member (described, Biblically, as "seeking her children"). Ahab refuses. After Moby Dick sinks the Pequod, the Rachel rescues Ishmael, the sole survivor.
- Delight: the captain has attempted to capture Moby Dick, resulting in the destruction of one of its whaleboats and the deaths of five crewmen. This misfortune serves as a harbinger of the doom that is about to befall the Pequod.
