= Queequeg =

Character from the novel Moby-Dick

- Moby Dick character
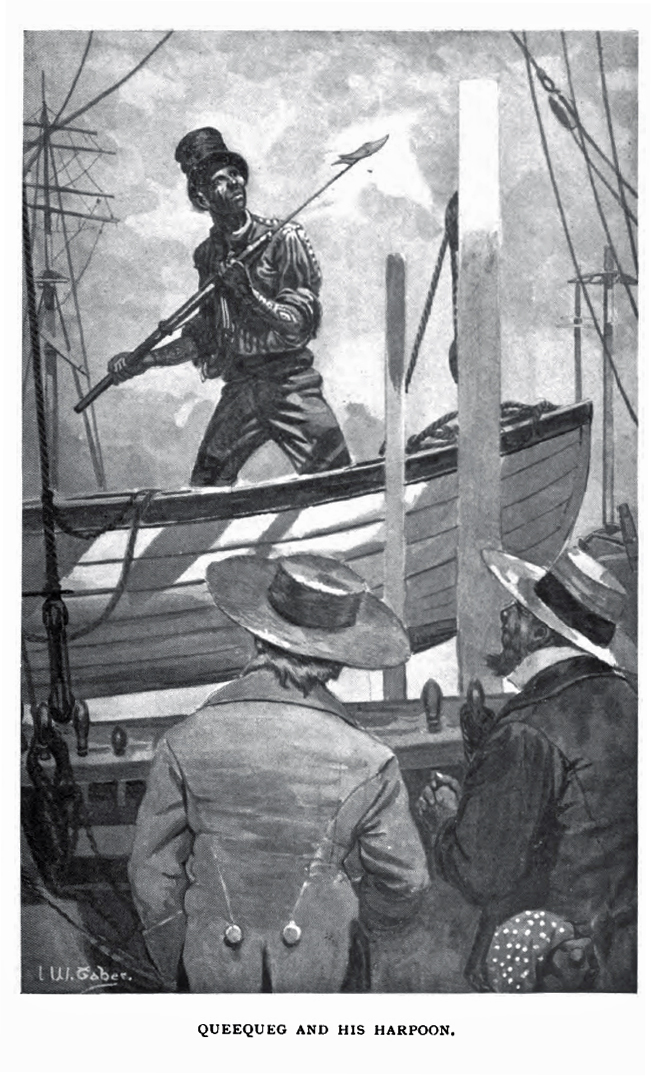
- Created by: Herman Melville

In-universe information
- Gender: Male
- Nationality: South Pacific Islander

Queequeg is a character in the 1851 novel Moby-Dick by American author Herman Melville. The story outlines his royal, Polynesian descent, as well as his desire to "visit Christendom" that led him to leave his homeland. Queequeg is visually distinguished by his striking facial tattoos and tan skin. Ishmael encounters Queequeg in Chapter Three and they become unlikely friends. Once aboard the whaling ship the Pequod, Queequeg becomes the harpooneer for the mate Starbuck.

== Familial and cultural history ==
Queequeg is native to the fictional island of Kokovoko (also known as Rokovoko), an "island far away to the West and South", or more specifically in the South Pacific Ocean. His father was the High Chief or King of his tribe, while his uncle was the High Priest, and several of his aunts were the wives of mighty warriors. Queequeg's culture is referenced to be cannibalistic. The narration of the book makes it clear that cannibalism was not universally accepted at this time.

In the novel, Queequeg is described as having an "ambitious soul" and a "wild desire to visit Christendom". When a Sag Harbor whaling ship docked at the island, he attempted to board but was turned away because the captain had a full complement of crewmen. As the ship was leaving, Queequeg caught up to it in a canoe and boarded. The captain was so impressed by his tenacity that he allowed Queequeg to join the crew. He was trained as a whaleman during this time and continued in this profession going forward.

Despite his interest in "Christendom", Queequeg practices a pagan religion, a form of animism using a small idol named Yojo, for whom he builds small ceremonial fires. As part of his religion, he practices a prolonged period of fasting and silence (which Ishmael calls his "Ramadan"). In chapter seventeen, Queequeg locks himself in his room in Nantucket to keep his fast and silence. Even after Ishmael enters the room, Queequeg is unbothered and does not acknowledge his presence.

== Queequeg's tattoos ==
In her book Tattooing the World, author Juniper Ellis contemplates the significance of Queequeg's face and bodily markings. Ellis claims that Melville was inspired by a representation of the Māori Chief Te Pēhi Kupe in George Lillie Craik's book, The New Zealanders. Records indicate that Melville's encounter with Craik's book in 1850 caused him to replace Bulkington (the originally intended companion of Ishmael) with a new character: Queequeg.

While the descriptions of Queequeg's tattoos are dissimilar to those of the Māori Chief, Ellis claims that Melville took inspiration from Te Pēhi Kupe. The parallels and distinctions between his source of inspiration are important to Ellis's interpretation of Queequeg. Although they are similar, Queequeg's tattoos are described in the text as more geometric and square-shaped than the Māori tattoos that are often "rounded into spirals". Because the historical evidence points to Craik's book as an inspiration for Melville, Ellis argues that these tattoos similarly indicate genealogy, family, and individual identities. Additionally, she believes that these parallels create a stronger link between Queequeg and Pacific origin cultures.

== Relationship with Ishmael ==
Queequeg and Ishmael first meet in New Bedford, Massachusetts when Ishmael and he are placed in the same room of The Spouter-Inn. At this moment, Queequeg had just returned from a whaling voyage and Ishmael was staying the night on the way towards a voyage as well. Queequeg returns late to the inn, not knowing that Ishmael has been booked into the same room with him. Ishmael is at first afraid of this unfamiliar person who he must share a bed with, however, he keeps an open mind. He quickly comes to the conclusion that "for all his tattooings he [Queequeg] was on the whole a clean, comely-looking cannibal."

Chapter Four begins with Queequeg's arm "thrown over" Ishmael in his sleep. This scene is an abrupt, striking contrast to the previous chapter in which Queequeg threatens to kill Ishmael. Ishmael states that "You had almost thought I had been his wife." Soon after, in Chapter 10, Queequeg proclaims that they are married, which in his country implies that they are "bosom friends".

Steven B. Herrmann analyzes this relationship in his journal article "Melville's Portrait of Same-Sex Marriage in Moby-Dick," interpreting it as "the first portrait of same-sex marriage in American literature." He sees the physical affection between the two characters as Melville moving beyond the "cultural imprints of homophobia" in literature.

== Queequeg's coffin ==
Toward the end of the novel Queequeg falls ill and is presumed to die. In chapter 110, Queequeg expresses his desire to not be buried in his hammock, "according to the usual sea-custom", but rather that a canoe-like coffin be made for him when he dies. Sickness does not overtake Queequeg. While he recovers from his illness, he does die by other means in the end. He does not survive the Pequod's wreck as Ishmael is the only survivor. Still, he is ultimately responsible for saving Ishmael's life from beyond the grave. Ishmael survives the wreck by clinging to the coffin that had been made for Queequeg.

Michael C. Berthold's journal article titled "Moby-Dick and American Slave Narrative" from the Massachusetts Review outlines one idea regarding the symbolic meaning of Queequeg's coffin. When Queequeg heals and is no longer presumed to die in chapter 110, the book mentions how he spent many hours "carving the lid with all manner of grotesque figures and drawings...to copy parts of the twisted tattooing on his body." In his article, Berthold says that because of the tattoos carved into it, the coffin is "Queequeg's sacred text and co-extensive with his own body." Berthold sees this moment as in contrast to chapter 18 when Captain Peleg mislabels him as Quohog in the forms enrolling him to work on the ship. Queequeg is unable to correct Peleg's mistake because he cannot read or write. He is only able to sign the document with a mark that replicates one tattoo on his right arm. Dissimilarly, Berthold mentions that the coffin allows for Queequeg to "reproduce his entire body" in terms of tattoos. Berthold sees this full representation of Queequeg's tattoos on the coffin as a reclamation of "the wholeness that the official discourse of a Peleg denies him" previously in chapter 18.

== Race through Queequeg ==
In her journal article "'Defamiliarization' and the Ideology of Race in 'Moby Dick'", Martha Vick states that the "use of language to acknowledge equality [specifically in descriptions of Queequeg] bestows the highest dignity possible on a nonwhite character at the same time that it calls into question the use of racial characteristics as criteria for determining identity." For example, Ishmael initially describes Queequeg as a cannibal and a savage, but soon realizes that his appearances are misleading. Vick believes that Ishmael's consideration of Queequeg that contrasts the "illusion of his darkness" with the "reality of his goodness" promotes questioning of the traditional ideas of the racial hierarchy. Vick mentions how Ishmael then states that "a man can be honest in any sort of skin", which contributes to her argument that Melville's language encourages a new and just way of thinking.

At one point in chapter 10, Ishmael describes Queequeg as having "large, deep eyes, fiery black and bold... He looked like a man who had never cringed and never had had a creditor... His [Queequeg's] forehead was drawn out in freer and brighter relief, and looked more expansive than it otherwise would." Ishmael goes on to equate this description of Queequeg to George Washington's head. Ishmael states: "It had the same long regularly graded retreating, like two long promontories thickly wooded on top. Queequeg was George Washington cannibalistically developed."

== Skills and interests ==
In Chapter Three, Queequeg stays out late selling human heads from New Zealand.

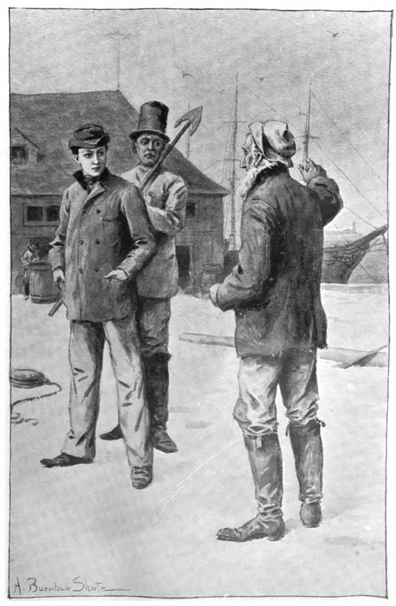
Queequeg (center) and Ishmael approach the Pequod

He is an extraordinary harpooner, demonstrating his skill for the money-tight owners of the Pequod by striking a small drop of tar floating on the water with one throw. The owners are so impressed that they immediately offer him a 90th lay (1/90 of the ship's profit) in exchange for his signing on with the crew. By contrast, Ishmael (who has experience in the merchant marine but none as a whaler) is initially offered a 777th lay but eventually secures a 300th. In port, Queequeg carries his sharpened harpoon with him at all times, unless prevented from doing so. He shaves with his harpoon as well and smokes regularly from a tomahawk that he carries with him.

== Cultural references ==
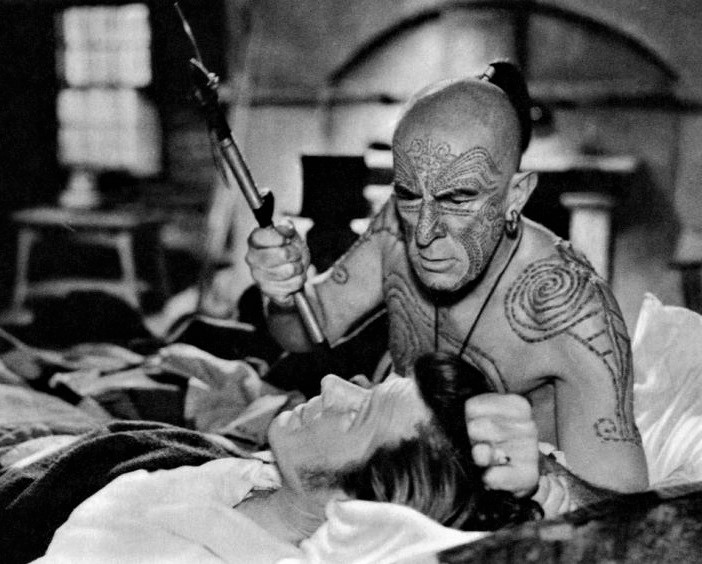
Austrian actor Friedrich von Ledebur as Queequeg in the 1956 film adaptation

- Sam Baker's most memorable role was Queequeg in The Sea Beast (1926).
- A version of Queequeg appears as a character in the Futurama episode "The Day the Earth Stood Stupid".
- On The X-Files, Special Agent Dana Scully named her dog Queequeg (last appearance Season 3 Episode 22) after the Moby-Dick character. The name was also taken as an email handle by Scully. In Season 11 Episode 7, Scully tells a security company representative her password to reset her home alarm is Queequeg.
- Queequeg's is the name of a coffee chain in the video game universe of Deus Ex: Invisible War. Its supposed in-game rival chain is named Pequod's.
- An alien species called Weequay is introduced in Return of the Jedi, whose denomination and physical appearance is a clear nod to Melville's Queequeg.
- In the eleventh book of Lemony Snicket's A Series of Unfortunate Events, the main characters, the Baudelaires, board a submarine named the Queequeg, operated by a crew who wear portraits of Herman Melville on their uniforms.
- In the South Korean indie gacha game Limbus Company, one of the 12 playable characters is a young woman named Ishmael. Her backstory, like that of every protagonist in the game, mirrors that of her literary counterpart. Queequeg is an important figure in Ishmael's backstory, and is depicted as an intimidating, muscular woman who had taken Ishmael under her wing, and with whom Ishmael had formed a deeper bond.
