= John Barrymore on stage, screen and radio =

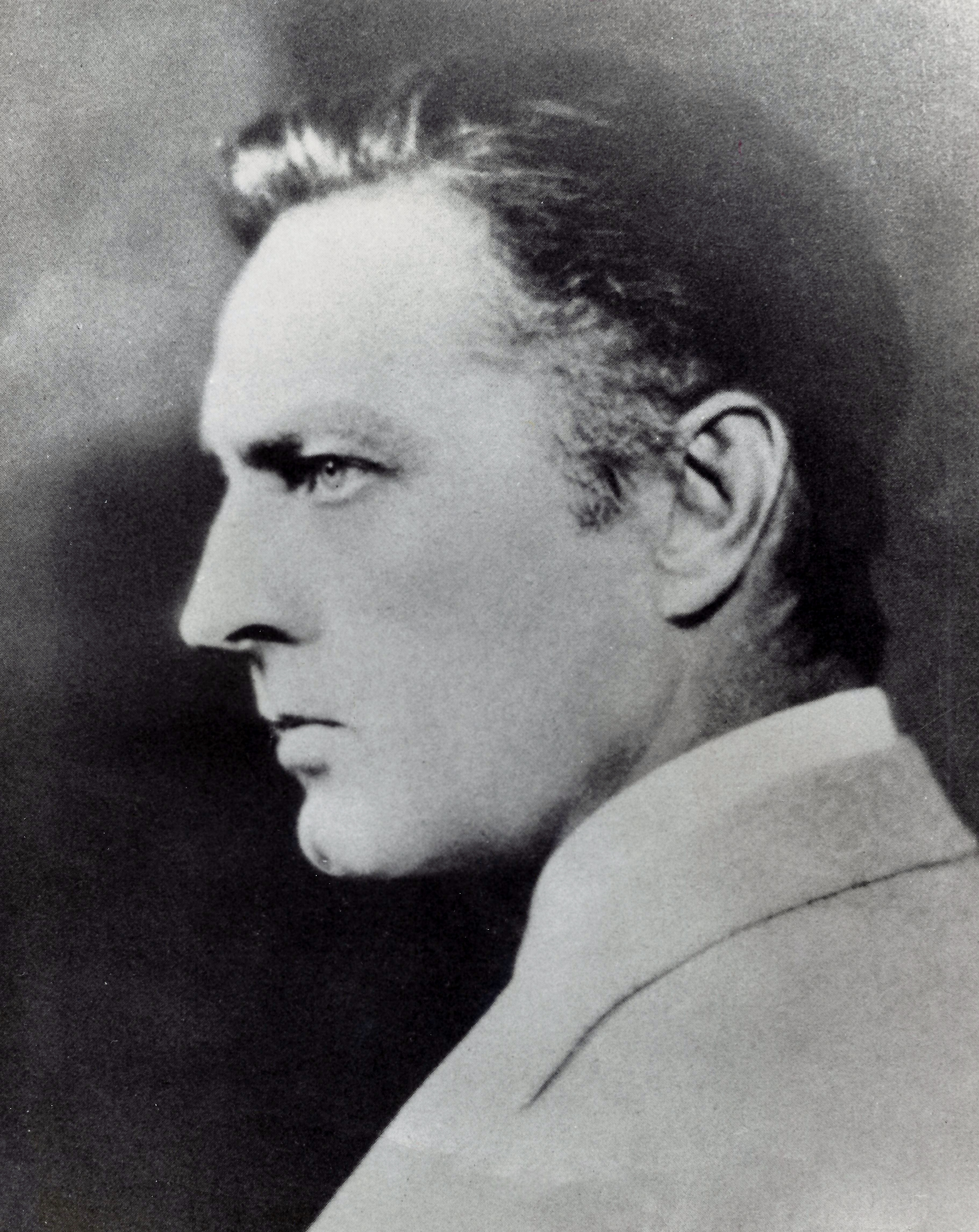
Barrymore in 1927

John Barrymore (born John Sidney Blyth; 1882–1942) was an American actor of stage, screen and radio who appeared in more than 40 plays, 60 films and 100 radio shows. He was the youngest child of the actors Maurice Barrymore and Georgie Drew Barrymore, and his two siblings were Lionel and Ethel; together they were known as America's "Royal Family" of actors, and John was "perhaps the most influential and idolized actor of his day", according to his biographer Martin F. Norden.

After Barrymore tried to start a career in art, becoming an illustrator at the New York Evening Journal, his father tempted him to appear on stage in 1901 in A Man of the World; the theater proved more interesting than the newspaper industry, and he quickly changed professions. In 1904 he appeared in his first stage show on Broadway, where he appeared in light comedies and musicals until 1914 when he began to turn to more serious roles, starting with The Yellow Ticket and Kick In. That year he also began to work in full-length films, and appeared in nine between 1914 and 1918, all of them slapstick or farce comedies. During the 1920s film roles became more serious, and he appeared in the lead role in Dr. Jekyll and Mr. Hyde (1920), which he followed with The Lotus Eater (1921), Sherlock Holmes (1922), Beau Brummel (1924) and The Sea Beast (1926). In between his film roles, he also took the lead in two major stage productions of Shakespeare. In 1920 he played Richard, Duke of Gloucester in Richard III; although a success, the play closed after only 31 performances when Barrymore "collapsed from the physical and psychological challenges of the role". In November 1922 he played the title character in Hamlet on Broadway for 101 performances, before touring the US until January 1924; Norden described the critics' reaction as "universally praising the production as the best Hamlet they had ever seen". After the US tour, Barrymore took the production to London, where it ran for a further 68 performances; The Manchester Guardian later described the first performance as "the most memorable first night for years".

Such was the success of Hamlet, that Warner Bros. signed Barrymore to a film contract. When his time with Warner Bros. finished, he signed a contract with United Artists to make three features: The Beloved Rogue (1927), Tempest (1928) and Eternal Love (1929). When that contract ended he returned to Warner Bros. for five further films, and was then picked up by Metro-Goldwyn-Mayer, where he appeared in Grand Hotel, A Bill of Divorcement and Rasputin and the Empress (all 1932). At the end of the MGM contract he became "a journeyman movie actor", in the words of Norden. In September 1940 Barrymore was invited to leave his imprint in the forecourt of Grauman's Chinese Theatre; instead of the traditional handprint, Barrymore left his facial profile, reflecting his nickname "The Great Profile". He was inducted to the Hollywood Walk of Fame on February 8, 1960.

Although Barrymore appeared in a number of successful films in the 1930s, including Counsellor at Law (1933) and Twentieth Century (1934), his increasing alcoholism led to memory loss and the inability to remember his lines. His problems with alcohol affected his confidence and he admitted to Helen Hayes, his co-star of Night Flight, that he had "completely lost [his] nerve" and that he "could never appear before an audience instead". In 1935 he was hospitalized after being unable to remember neither his seven lines for the film Hat, Coat, and Glove, nor his character's name. After his discharge from the hospital he enjoyed a brief career revival, although much of his film work "bore little distinction", according to Norden; the film historians Donald McCaffrey and Christopher Jacobs opine that Barrymore's "contribution to the art of cinematic acting began to fade" after the mid-1930s. Barrymore also enjoyed a fruitful career on radio, which included broadcasting six of Shakespeare's plays in a Streamlined Shakespeare series. Much of his radio work was in the 74 episodes of The Sealtest Show with Rudy Vallée; it was during a rehearsal for the show in May 1942 that Barrymore collapsed and was admitted to hospital, where he died on May 29.

== Stage appearances ==
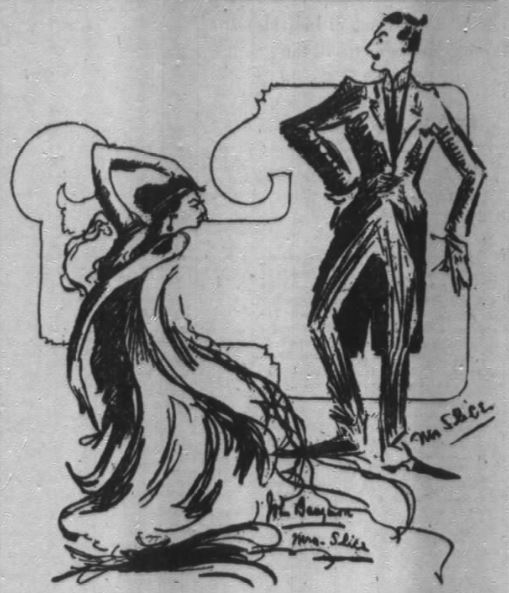
Barrymore drew a caricature of himself and Ethel in A Slice of Life, 1912

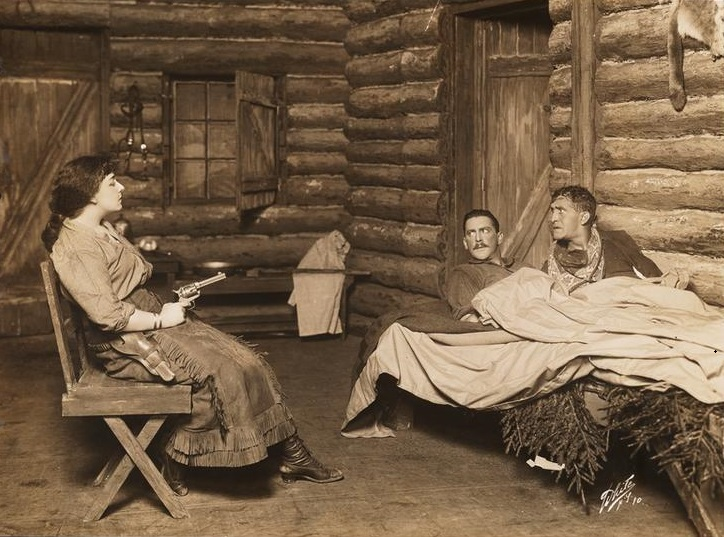
Mary Young, John Barrymore and Frank Campeau in Believe Me, Xantippe, 1913

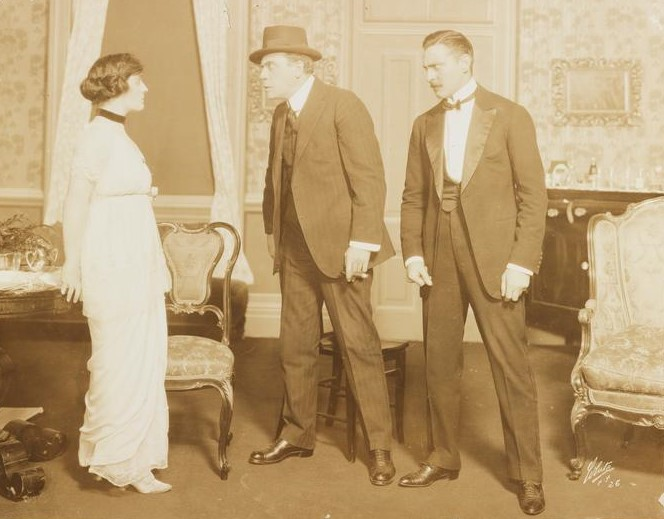
Jane Grey, Paul Everton and John Barrymore in Kick In, 1914

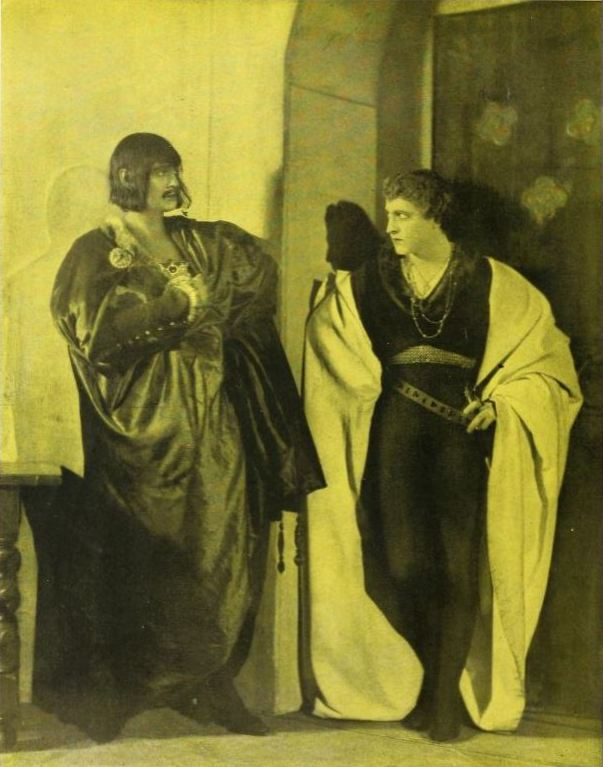
Barrymore (right) with his brother Lionel in The Jest, 1919

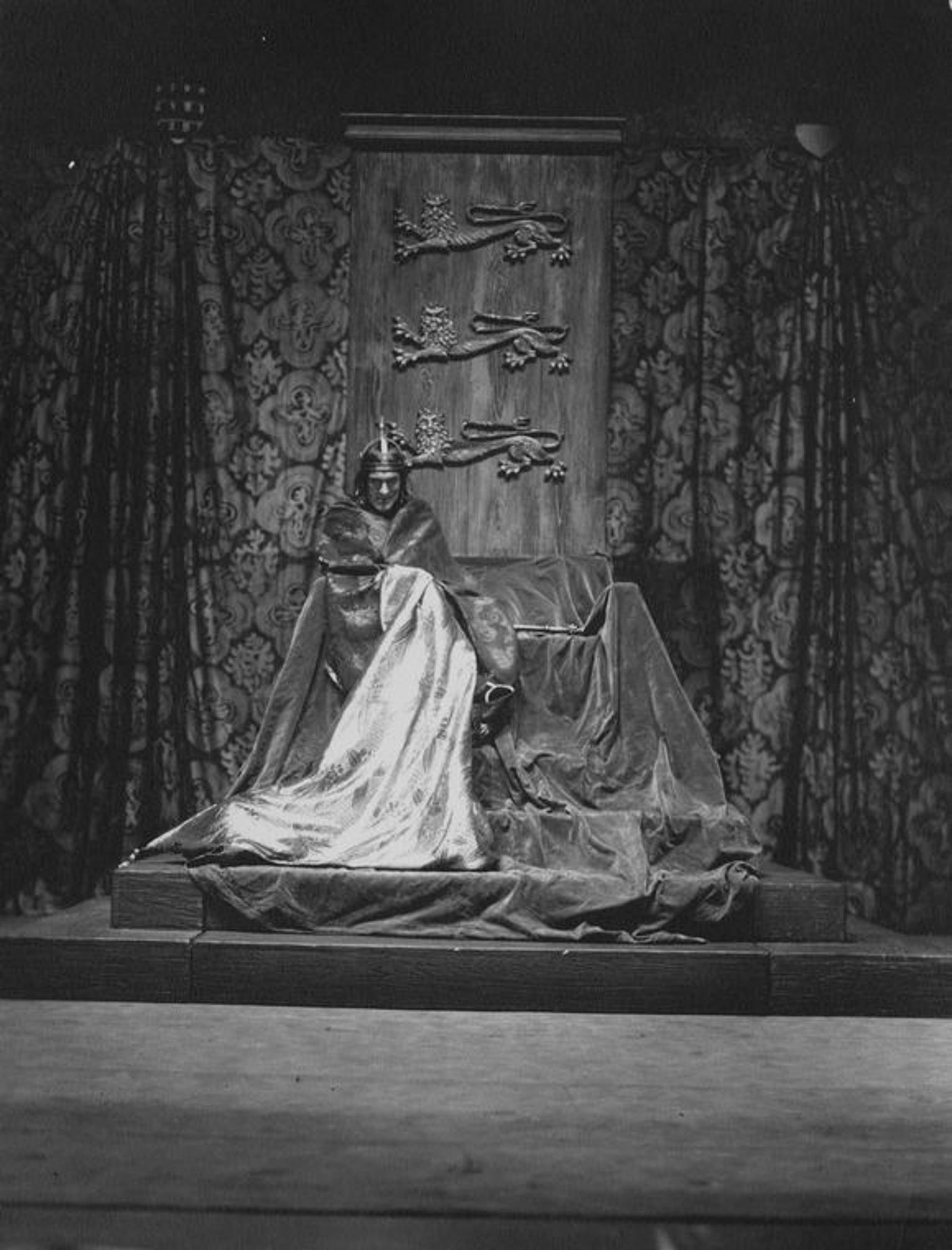
Barrymore as Richard III, 1920

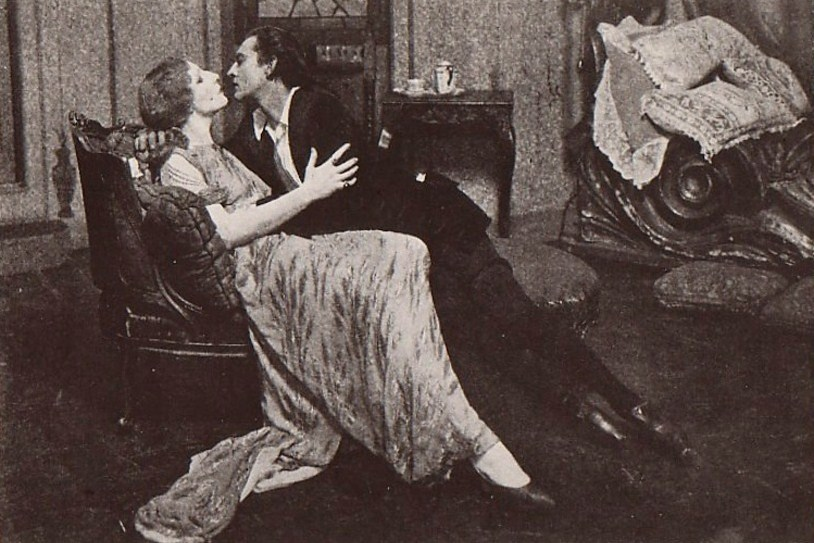
Violet Kemble-Cooper and Barrymore in Clair de Lune, 1921

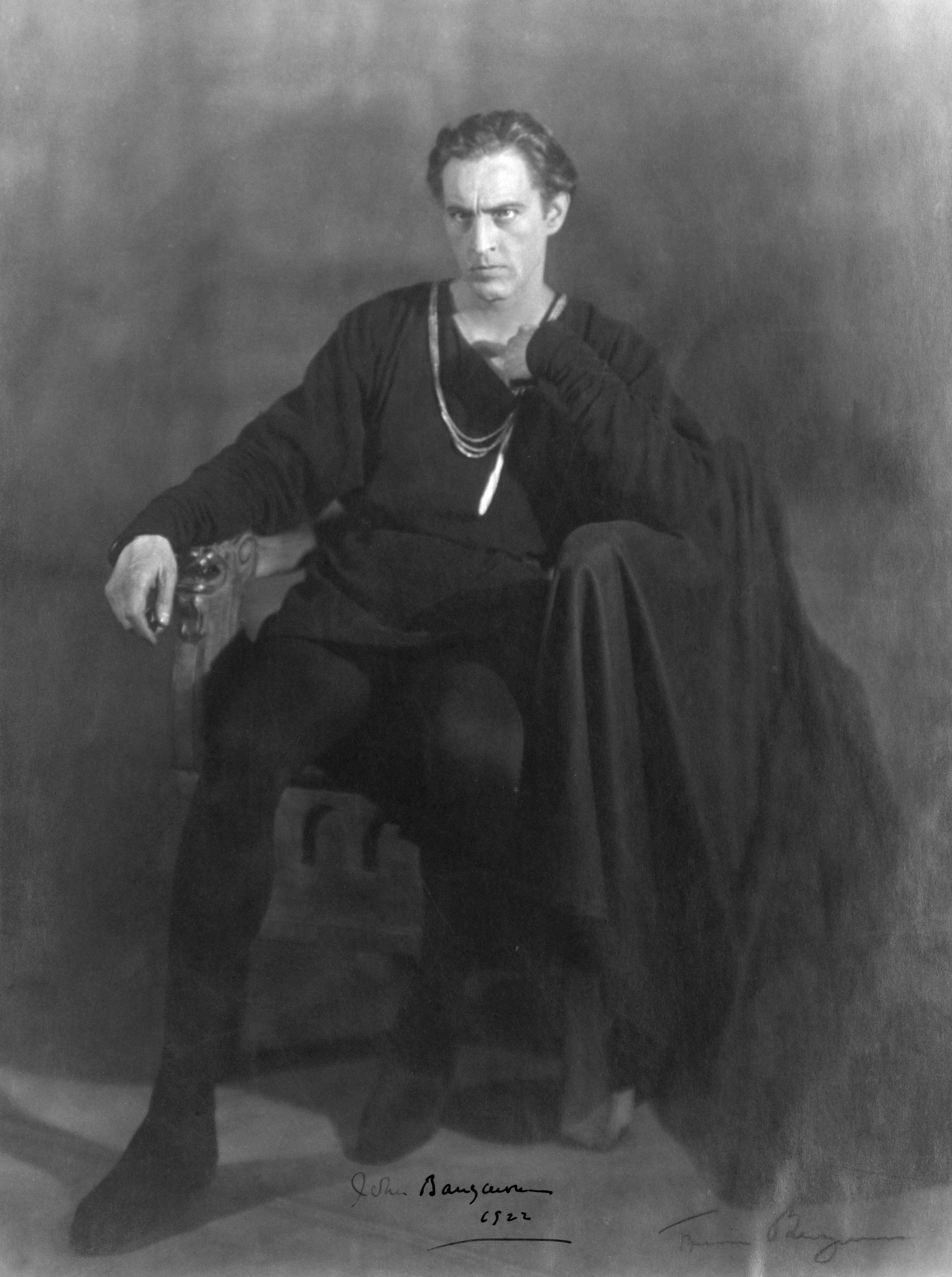
Barrymore as Hamlet, 1922

Barrymore's stage appearances
Production	Date	Theatre (New York, unless stated)	Role	Number of performances
A Man of the World	January 1901	Touring	George Ellis	
Captain Jinks of the Horse Marines	1901 – 02 season	Touring	Charles "Charlie" La Martine	
Madga	October 31, 1903	W. S. Cleveland's Theatre, Chicago	Lt. Max von Wendlowski	10
Leah the Forsaken	November 8, 1903	W. S. Cleveland's Theatre, Chicago	Jacob	18
Glad of It	December 28, 1903	Savoy Theatre	Corley	32
The Dictator	April 4, 1904	Criterion Theatre, then touring in US and Britain (September 1904 to July 1905)	Charlie Hyne	105
Yvette	May 13, 1904	Knickerbocker Theatre	Signor Valreali	1
Sunday	September – December 1905	Touring	Jacky	
Pantaloon	December 25, 1905 – March 1906	Criterion Theatre for 81, then touring from May 1906	Clown	81
Alice Sit-by-the-Fire	December 25, 1905 – March 1906	Criterion Theatre for 81, then touring (March to April 1906 and September 1906 to February 1907)	Stephen Rollo	81
Miss Civilization	January 26, 1906	Broadway Theatre	Brick Meakin, alias "Reddy the Kid"	1
On the Quiet	March – October 1906	Touring, US and Australia	Duke of Carbondale	
The Dictator	April – August 1906	Touring, US and Australia	Charley Hyne	
A Doll's House	January 31, 1907	Colonial Theatre, Boston	Dr. Rank	1
His Excellency the Governor	April 4, 1907	Empire Theatre	Capt. Charles Carew	36
The Boys of Company B	May 23 – July 1907	Lyceum Theatre, then touring (July to September 1907)	Tony Allen	96
Toddles	March 16, 1908	Garrick Theatre	Lord Meadows	16
A Stubborn Cinderella	June 1908 – May 1909	Touring (June 1908 – January 1909), then Broadway Theatre, Boston (January – April 1909), then touring (April – May 1909)	Mac	88
The Candy Shop	May – June 12, 1909	Knickerbocker Theatre	Jack Sweet	56
The Fortune Hunter	September 4, 1909 – May 1911	Gaiety Theatre, the touring (September 1910 to May 1911)	Nat Duncan	345
Uncle Sam	August 28, 1911	Touring (August to October 1911), then Liberty Theatre	Robert Hudson	48
Princess Zim-Zim	December 1911 – January 1912	Touring	Peter Milholland	
A Slice of Life	January 29 – March 1912	Empire Theatre	Mr. Hyphen-Brown	48
Half a Husband	March 11, 1912	Touring (less than 2 weeks)	Tony Bleecker	
On the Quiet	July 1, 1912	Belasco Theatre, Los Angeles	Robert Ridgway	14
The Honor of the Family	July 15, 1912	Belasco Theatre, Los Angeles	Colonel Philippe Bridau	6 (est)
The Man from Home	July 22, 1912	Belasco Theatre, Los Angeles	Daniel Voorhees Pike	14 (est)
The Affairs of Anatol	October 14, 1912	Little Theatre	Anatol	72
A Thief for a Night	March 13, 1913	McVicker's Theatre, Chicago	Robert Edgar Willoughby "Bobby" Pitt	46
Believe Me Xantippe	August 19, 1913	Thirty-Ninth St. Theatre	George MacFarland	79
The Yellow Ticket	January 20, 1914	Eltinge Theatre	Julian Rolfe	183
Kick In	October 19, 1914	Longacre Theatre	Chick Hewes	188
Actors' Fund Benefit	January 28, 1916	Forth-Fourth Street		1
Justice	April 3, 1916 – January 1917	Candler Theatre (April to September 1916), then touring (to January 1917)	William Falder	104
Junior Patriots of America Benefit	March 25, 1917	Hippodrome	Sailor	2
Peter Ibbetson	April 18, 1917 – May 1918	Republic Theatre (April to November 1917), then touring (to May 1918)	Peter Ibbetson	71
The National Red Cross Pageant	October 5, 1917	Rosemary Open Air Theatre	Tyrant	4
Redemption	October 3, 1918	Plymouth Theatre	Fedor "Fedya" Vasilyevich Protasov	204
The Jest	April 9, 1919	Plymouth Theatre	Giannetto Malespini	256
Richard III	March 6, 1920	Plymouth Theatre	Richard, Duke of Gloucester	31
Clair de Lune	April 18, 1921	Empire Theatre	Gwymplane	64
Annual Equity Show	May 1, 1921	Metropolitan Opera House	Romeo	2
Hamlet	November 16, 1922 – January 26, 1924	Sam H. Harris Theatre (November 1922 – February 1923), Manhattan Opera House (November and December 1923 – 3 weeks), then touring (December 1923 – January 26, 1924)	Hamlet	101
Hamlet	February 19, 1925	Theatre Royal Haymarket, London	Hamlet	68
My Dear Children	March 1939	Touring (March 1939 to January 1940), then the Belasco Theatre	Allan Manville	
The Green Goddess	June 9, 1939	Palace Theatre, Chicago		20 (est)

== Filmography ==
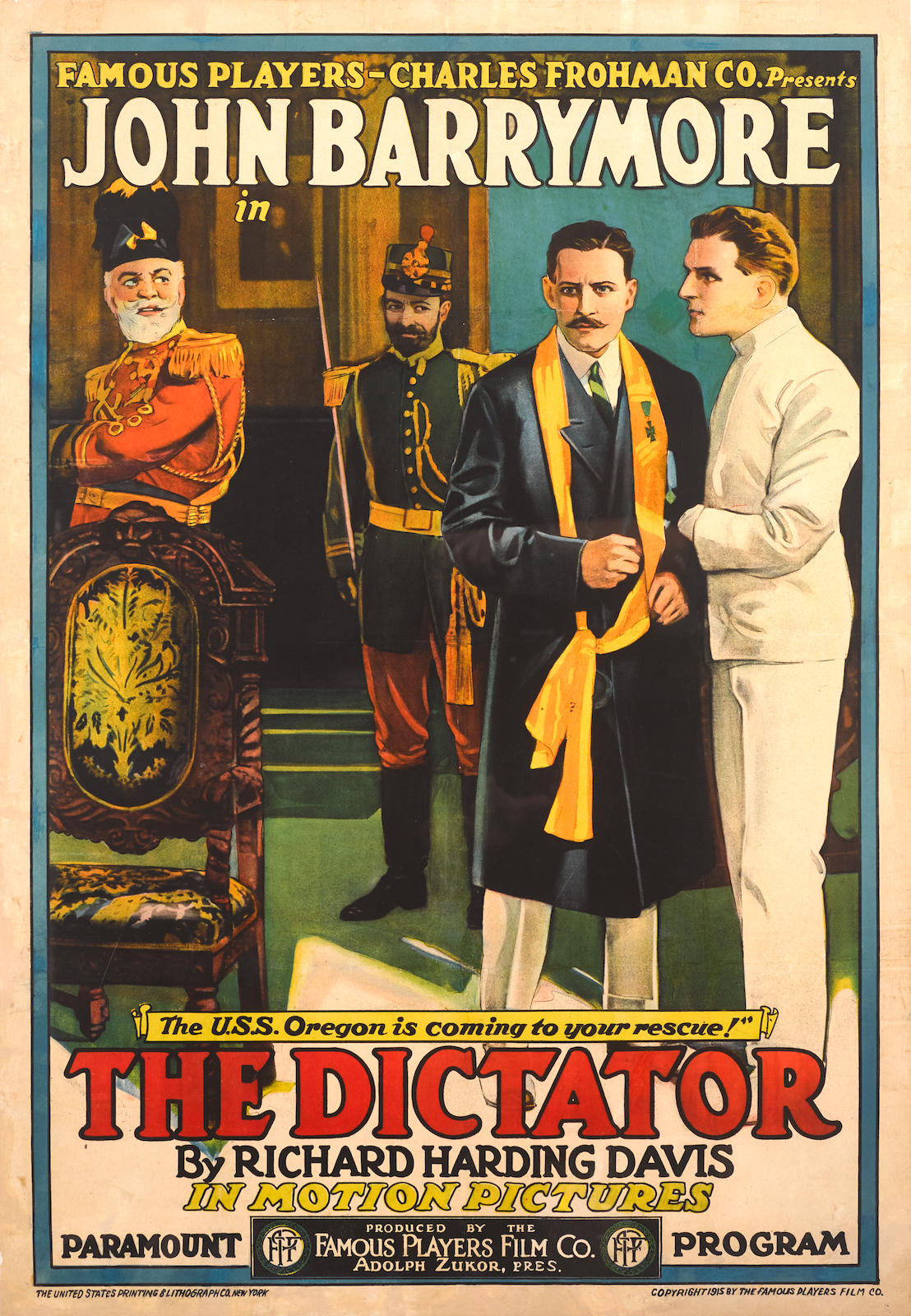
The Dictator, 1915

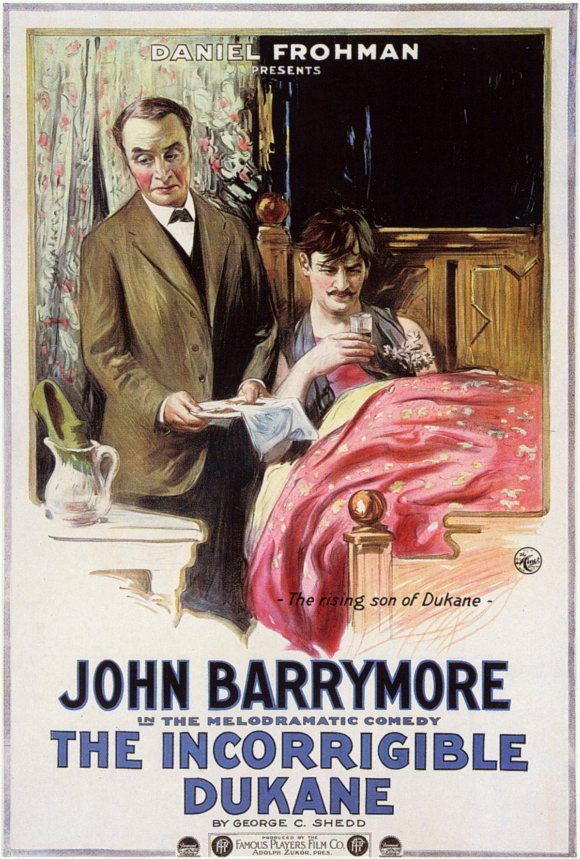
The Incorrigible Dukane, 1915

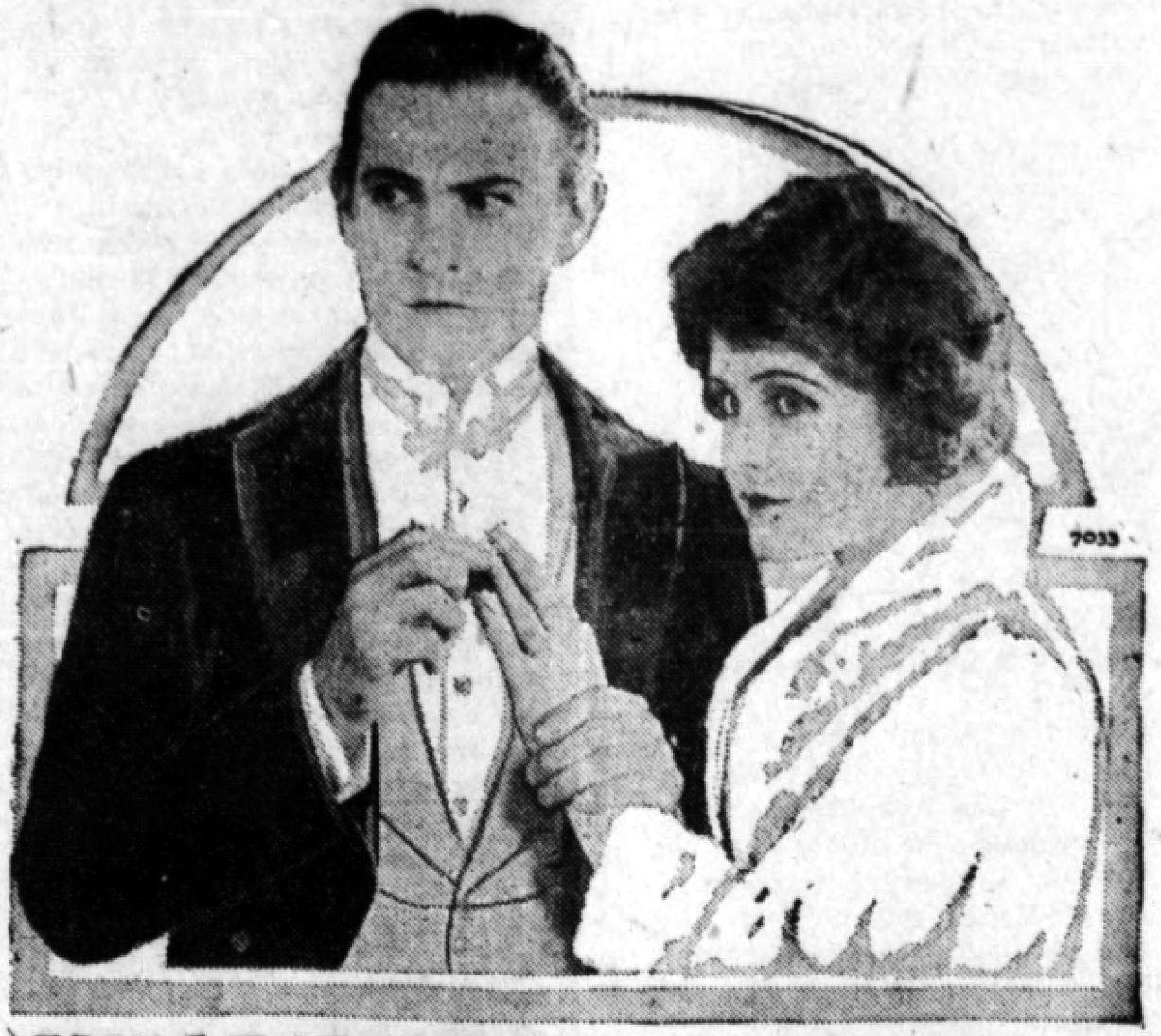
Barrymore and Lois Meredith in the 1918 film On the Quiet

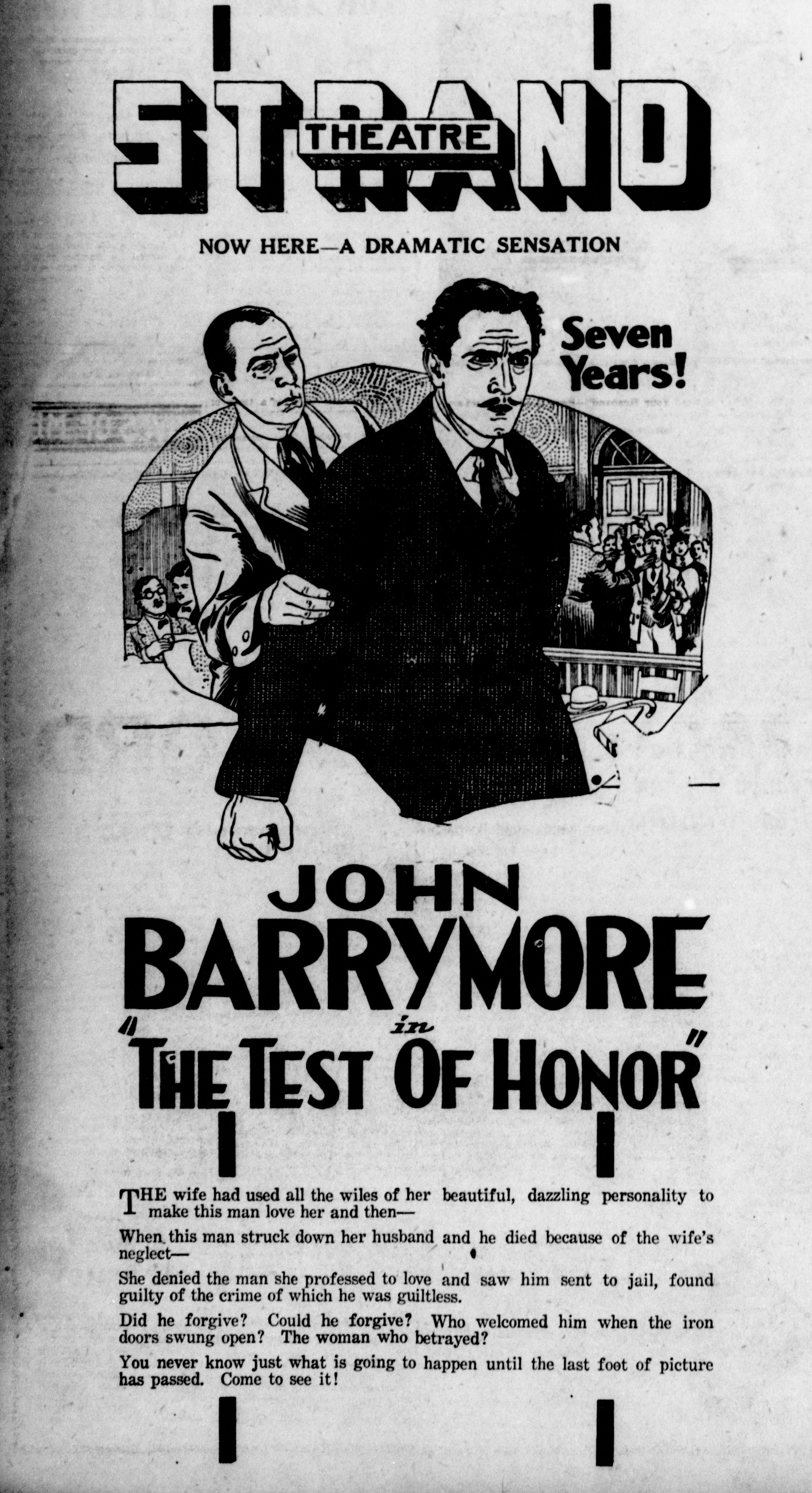
The Seattle Star newspaper ad for The Test of Honor(1919)

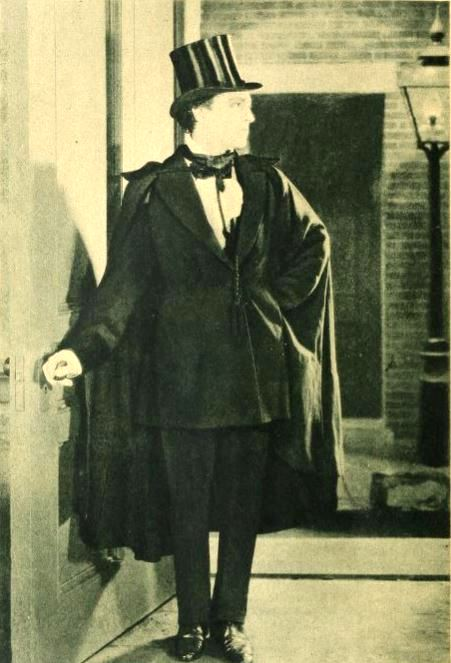
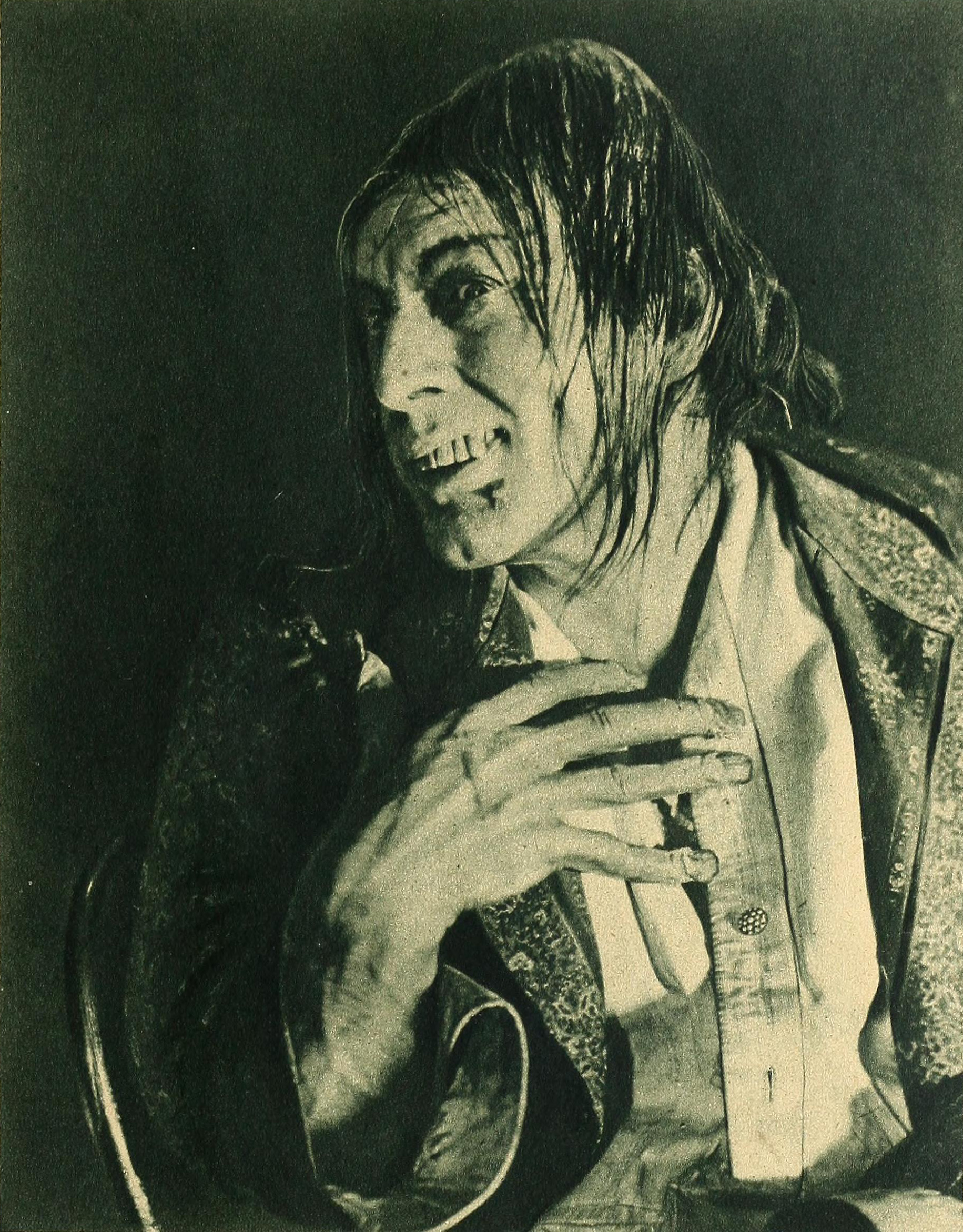
Barrymore as Dr. Jekyll (top) and Mr. Hyde (bottom) in Dr. Jekyll and Mr. Hyde (1920)

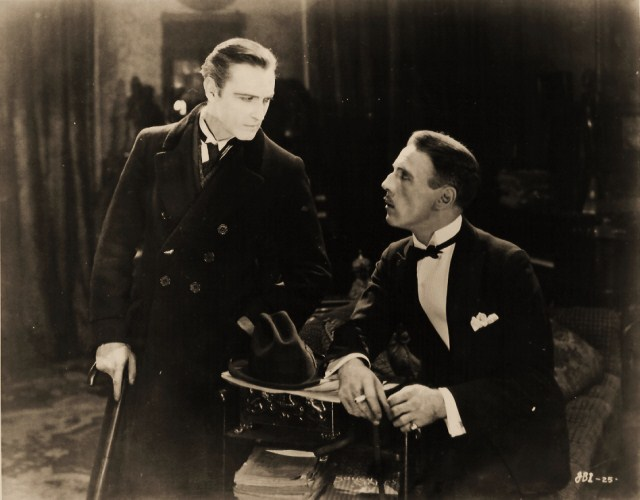
Barrymore (left), as Sherlock Holmes, with Roland Young, 1922

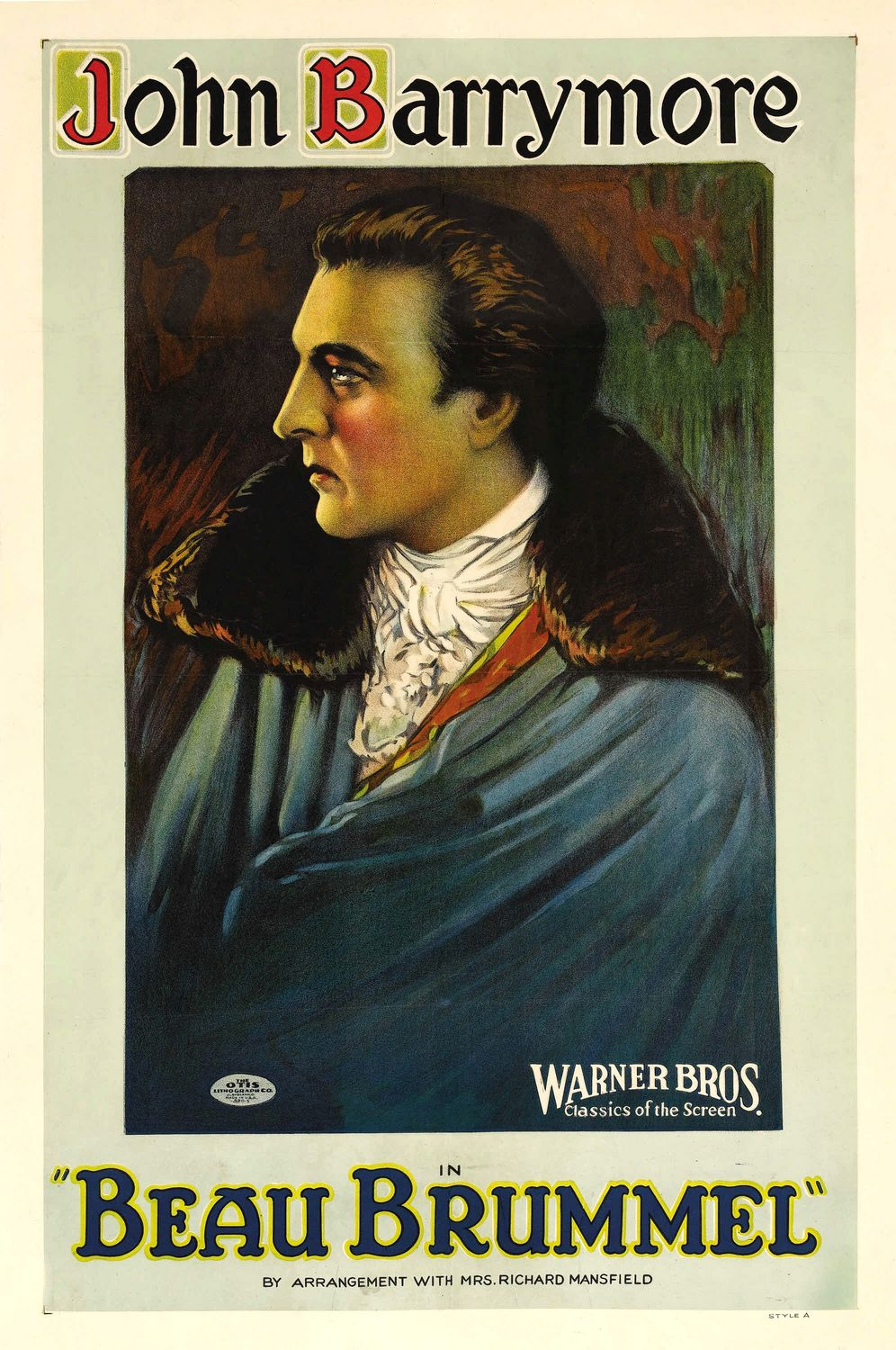
Poster for the 1924 film Beau Brummel

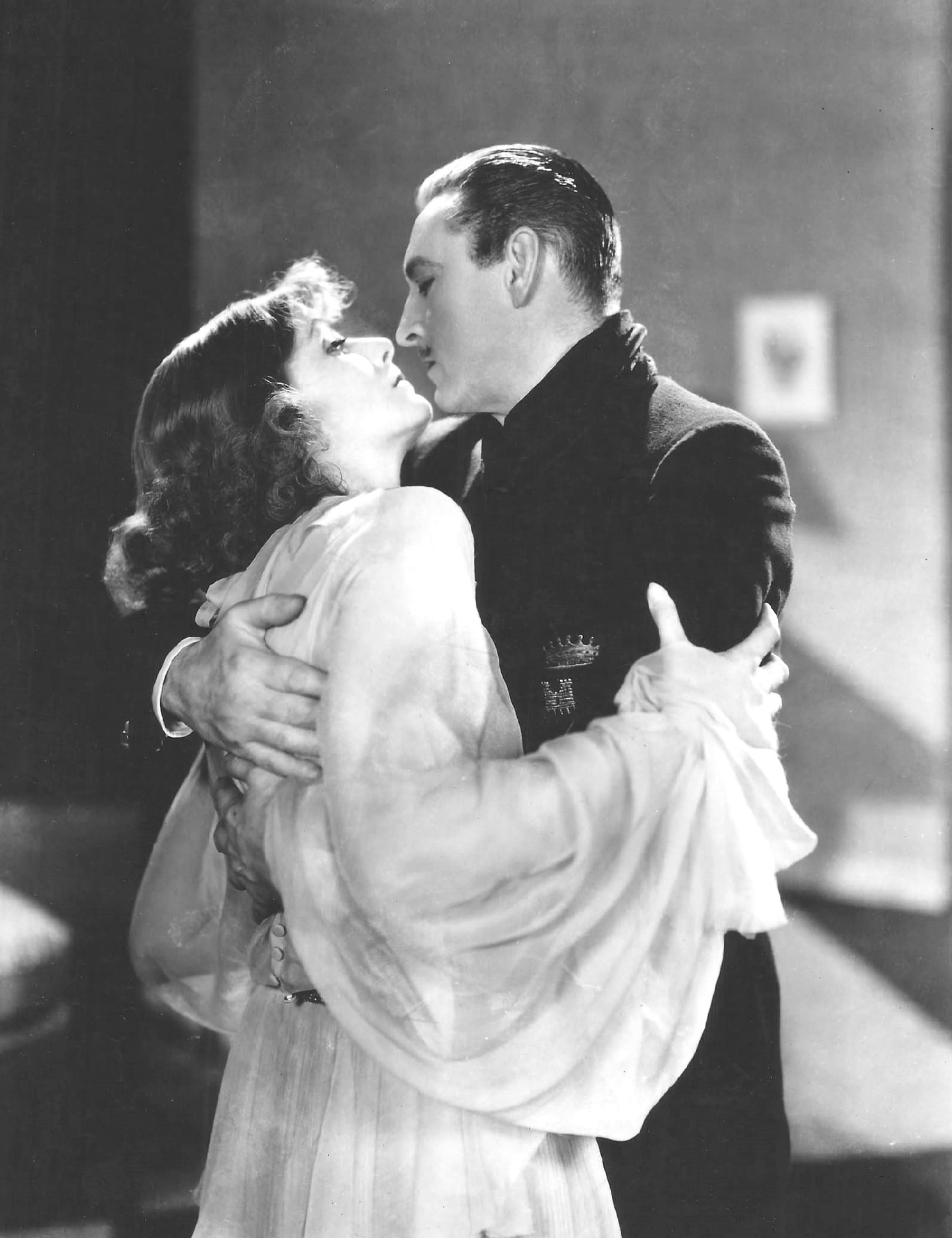
Barrymore with Greta Garbo in Grand Hotel, 1932

Barrymore's filmography
Film	Year	Role	Notes
A Lodging for the Night	1912	Thug	Both John and his brother Lionel appear uncredited. A D. W. Griffith directed short starring Mary Pickford, both brothers appearances seem impromptu though Lionel was a regular in Griffith productions at this time.
Dream of a Motion Picture Director	1912	Boss	Lost film; 1 reel. Credited as "Jack Barrymore", this is probably John Barrymore, although Norden notes that "we may never know for certain if ... [these films] are in fact Barrymore movies".
The Widow Casey's Return	1912	Sullivan	Lost film; 1 reel. Credited as "Jack Barrymore", this is probably John Barrymore, although Norden notes that "we may never know for certain if ... [these films] are in fact Barrymore movies".
A Prize Package	1912	Si Hawkins	Lost film; 1 reel. Credited as "Jack Barrymore", this is probably John Barrymore, although Norden notes that "we may never know for certain if ... [these films] are in fact Barrymore movies".
One on Romance	1913	Helen's Father	Lost film; on a split reel (Note: A split reel is where two films are placed on the same reel.) Credited as "Jack Barrymore", this is probably John Barrymore, although Norden notes that "we may never know for certain if ... [these films] are in fact Barrymore movies".
An American Citizen	1914	Beresford Kruger	Lost film
The Man from Mexico	1914	Fitzhugh	Lost film
Are You a Mason?	1915	Frank Perry	Lost film
The Dictator	1915	Brooke Travers	Lost film
The Incorrigible Dukane	1915	James Dukane	
Nearly a King	1916	Jack Merriwell, Prince of Bulwana	Lost film
The Lost Bridegroom	1916	Bertie Joyce	Lost film
The Red Widow	1916	Cicero Hannibal Butts	Lost film
Raffles, the Amateur Cracksman	1917	A. J. Raffles	
National Red Cross Pageant	1917	The Tyrant (Russian episode)	Lost film
On the Quiet	1918	Robert Ridgeway	Lost film
Here Comes the Bride	1919	Frederick Tile	Lost film
The Test of Honor	1919	Martin Wingrave	Lost film
Dr. Jekyll and Mr. Hyde	1920	Dr. Henry Jekyll and Mr. Edward Hyde	
The Lotus Eater	1921	Jacques Leroi	Lost film
Sherlock Holmes	1922	Sherlock Holmes	
Beau Brummel	1924	Gordon Bryon "Beau" Brummell	
The Sea Beast	1926	Captain Ahab Ceeley	
Don Juan	1926	Don Jose de Marana/Don Juan de Marana	
When a Man Loves	1927	Chevalier Fabien des Grieux	
The Beloved Rogue	1927	François Villon	
Tempest	1928	Sgt. Ivan Markov	
Eternal Love	1929	Marcus Paltran	
The Show of Shows	1929	Richard, Duke of Gloucester	in Henry VI, Part 3
General Crack	1930	Duke of Kurland/Prince Christian	
The Man from Blankley's	1930	Lord Strathpeffer	Lost film
Moby Dick	1930	Captain Ahab Ceely	
Svengali	1931	Svengali	
The Mad Genius	1931	Ivan Tsarakov	
Arsène Lupin	1932	Arsène Lupin	
Grand Hotel	1932	The Baron	Grand Hotel was inducted into the National Film Registry in 2007.
State's Attorney	1932	Tom Cardigan	
A Bill of Divorcement	1932	Hilary Fairfield	
Rasputin and the Empress	1932	Prince Paul Chegodieff	
Topaze	1933	Prof. Auguste A. Topaze	
Reunion in Vienna	1933	Archduke Rudolf von Habsburg	
Dinner at Eight	1933	Larry Renault	
Night Flight	1933	A. Riviére	
Counsellor at Law	1933	George Simon	
Long Lost Father	1934	Carl Bellairs	
Twentieth Century	1934	Oscar Jaffe	Twentieth Century was inducted into the National Film Registry in 2011.
Romeo and Juliet	1936	Mercutio	
Maytime	1937	Nicolai Nazaroff	
Bulldog Drummond Comes Back	1937	Colonel Neilson	
Night Club Scandal	1937	Dr. Ernest Tindal	
Bulldog Drummond's Revenge	1937	Colonel Neilson	
True Confession	1937	Charles "Charley" Jasper	
Bulldog Drummond's Peril	1938	Colonel Neilson	
Romance in the Dark	1938	Zoltan Jason	
Marie Antoinette	1938	King Louis XV	
Spawn of the North	1938	Windy Turlon	
Hold That Co-Ed	1938	Governor Gabby Harrigan	
The Great Man Votes	1939	Gregory Vance	
Midnight	1939	Georges Flammarion	Midnight was inducted into the National Film Registry in 2013.
The Great Profile	1940	Evans Garrick	
The Invisible Woman	1940	Professor Gibbs	
World Premiere	1941	Duncan DeGrasse	
Playmates	1941	John Barrymore	

== Radio broadcasts ==
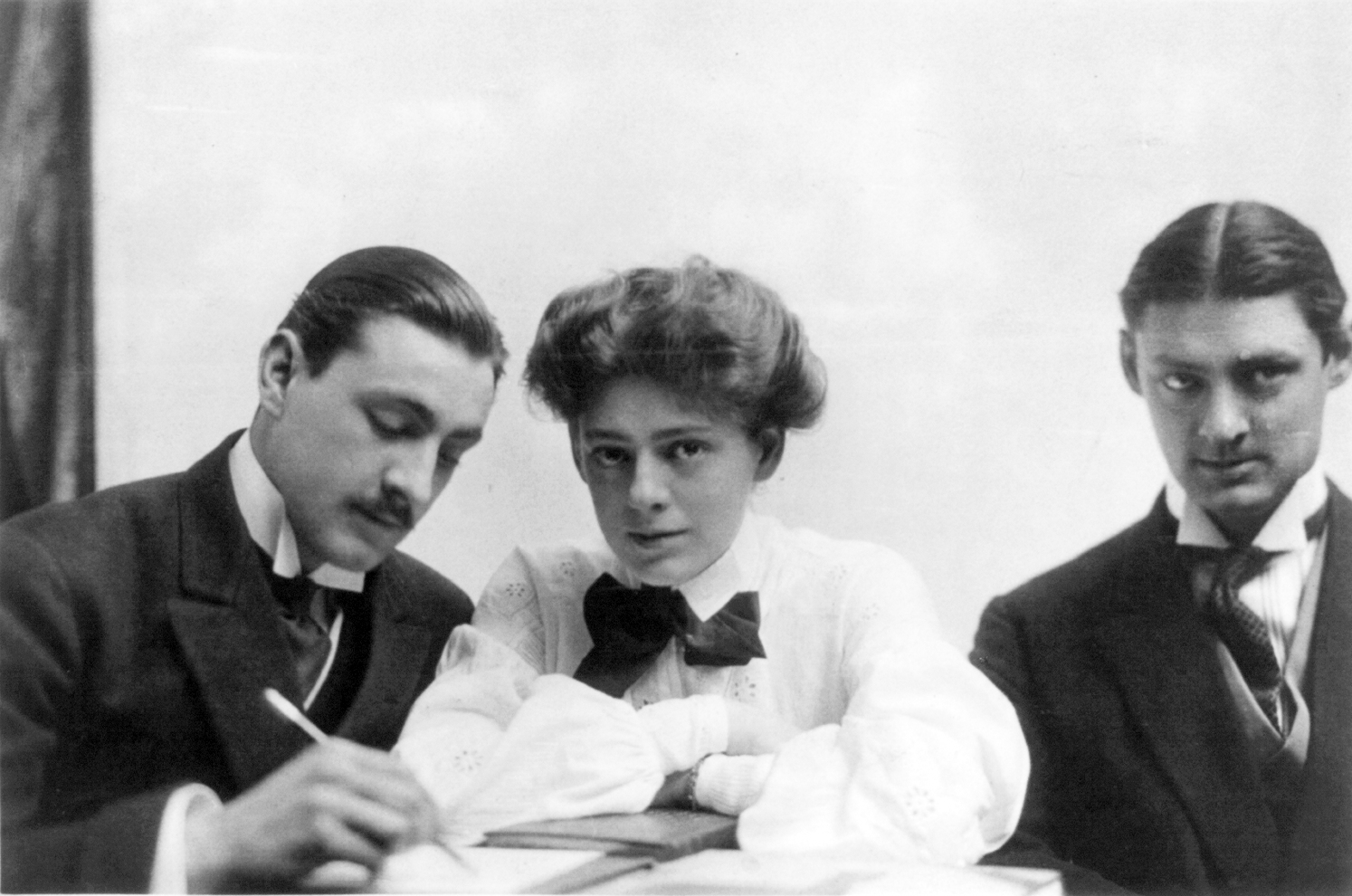
Barrymore (left), with his siblings Lionel and Ethel, 1904

Barrymore, by John Singer Sargent, 1923

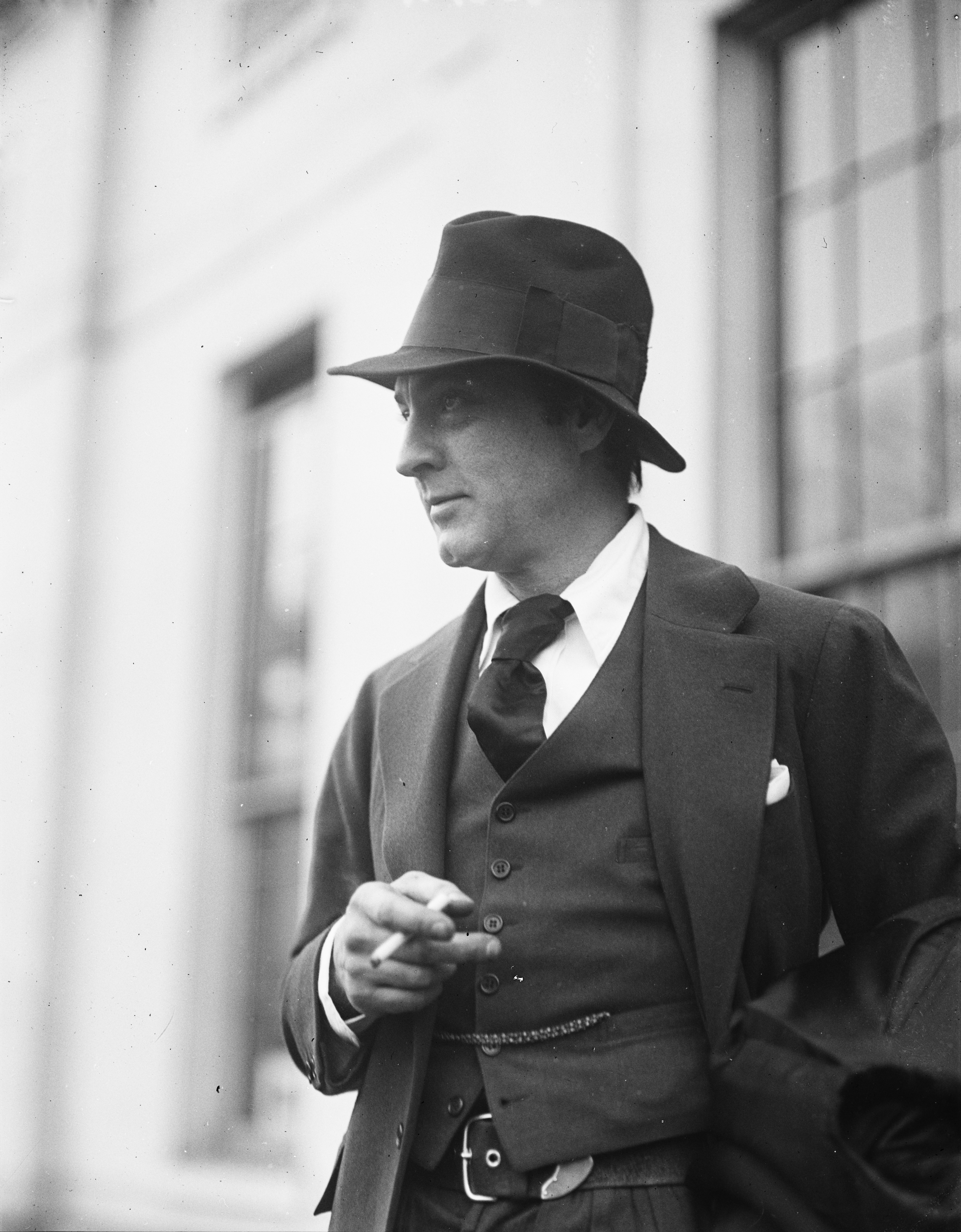
Barrymore at the White House in January 1924

Barrymore's radio broadcasts
Broadcast	Date	Network	Role	Notes
Hamlet	March 8, 1925	2LO, UK	Hamlet	
[Unknown]	January 15, 1926	WBPI, New York		
Dodge Brothers Hour	March 29, 1928	NBC Blue Network		
The Fleischmann's Yeast Hour	May 23, 1935	NBC Red Network		
Shell Chateau	December 14, 1935	NBC Red Network		
Hollywood Hotel: "A Christmas Carol"	December 25, 1936	CBS	Scrooge	
Streamlined Shakespeare: Hamlet	June 21, 1937	NBC Blue Network	Hamlet	
Interview (Note: The New York Times lists the show as John Barrymore and Elaine Barrie, Actors, Interviewed; the Library of Congress lists it as John and Elaine Barrymore.)	June 25, 1937	NBC Blue Network		
Streamlined Shakespeare: Richard III	June 28, 1937	NBC Blue Network	Richard, Duke of Gloucester	
Streamlined Shakespeare: Macbeth	July 5, 1937	NBC Blue Network	Macbeth	
Streamlined Shakespeare: The Tempest	July 12, 1937	NBC Blue Network	Prospero/Caliban	
Streamlined Shakespeare: Twelfth Night	July 19, 1937	NBC Blue Network	Sir Toby Belch/Malvolio	
Streamlined Shakespeare: The Taming of the Shrew	July 26, 1937	NBC Blue Network	Petruchio	
The Animal Kingdom	September 6, 1937	NBC Blue Network	Tom Collier	
Accent on Youth	September 13, 1937	NBC Blue Network		
The Baker's Broadcast	October 10, 1937	NBC Blue Network		
This is New York	February 19, 1938	CBS		
The Camel Caravan	June 6, 1938	CBS		
The Texaco Star Theatre	October 12, 1938 – January 11, 1939	CBS		9 episodes
The Kate Smith Calumet Baking Powder Show	January 26, 1939	CBS		
The Chase and Sanborn Show	September 22, 1940	NBC Red Network		
The Sealtest Show	October 17, 1940 – May 14, 1942	NBC Red Network		74 episodes
The Screen Guild Theater: "The Great Man Votes"	November 3, 1940	CBS	Gregory Vance	
Salute to Ethel Barrymore: Forty Years a Star	February 4, 1941	NBC Blue Network		
Time to Smile	February 26, 1941	NBC Red Network		
Hollywood	June 2, 1941	CBS		
United Service Organizations Benefit	June 29, 1941	CBS		

== Notes and references ==
=== Sources ===
- Byers, Paula K., ed. (1998). "The Barrymores". Encyclopedia of World Biography. Detroit, MI: Gale Research. ISBN 978-0-7876-2541-2.
- McCaffrey, Donald W.; Jacobs, Christopher P. (1999). Guide to the Silent Years of American Cinema. Westport, CT: Greenwood Publishing Group. ISBN 978-0-313-30345-6.
- Kobler, John (1977). Damned in Paradise: The Life of John Barrymore. New York, NY: Atheneum. ISBN 978-0-689-10814-3.
- Miller, Blair (1995). American Silent Film Comedies: An Illustrated Encyclopedia of Persons, Studios and Terminology. Jefferson, NC: McFarland & Co. ISBN 978-0-89950-929-7.
- Morrison, Michael A. (1997). John Barrymore: Shakespearean Actor. Cambridge: Cambridge University Press. ISBN 978-0-521-62028-4.
- Norden, Martin F. (1995). John Barrymore: A Bio-Bibliography. Westport, CT: Greenwood Publishing Group. ISBN 978-0-313-29268-2.
- Norden, Martin F. (2000). "Barrymore, John (1882–1942)". In Pendergast, Sara; Pendergast, Tom (eds.). St. James Encyclopedia of Popular Culture, Volume 1. Detroit, MI: St. James Press. ISBN 978-1-55862-401-6.
- Peters, Margot (1990). The House of Barrymore. New York, NY: Touchstone. ISBN 978-0-671-74799-2.
- Tibbetts, John C.; Welsh, James M. (2010). American Classic Screen Features. Plymouth: Scarecrow Press. ISBN 978-0-8108-7679-8.
