= The Sea Beast (1926 film) =

1926 American silent drama film

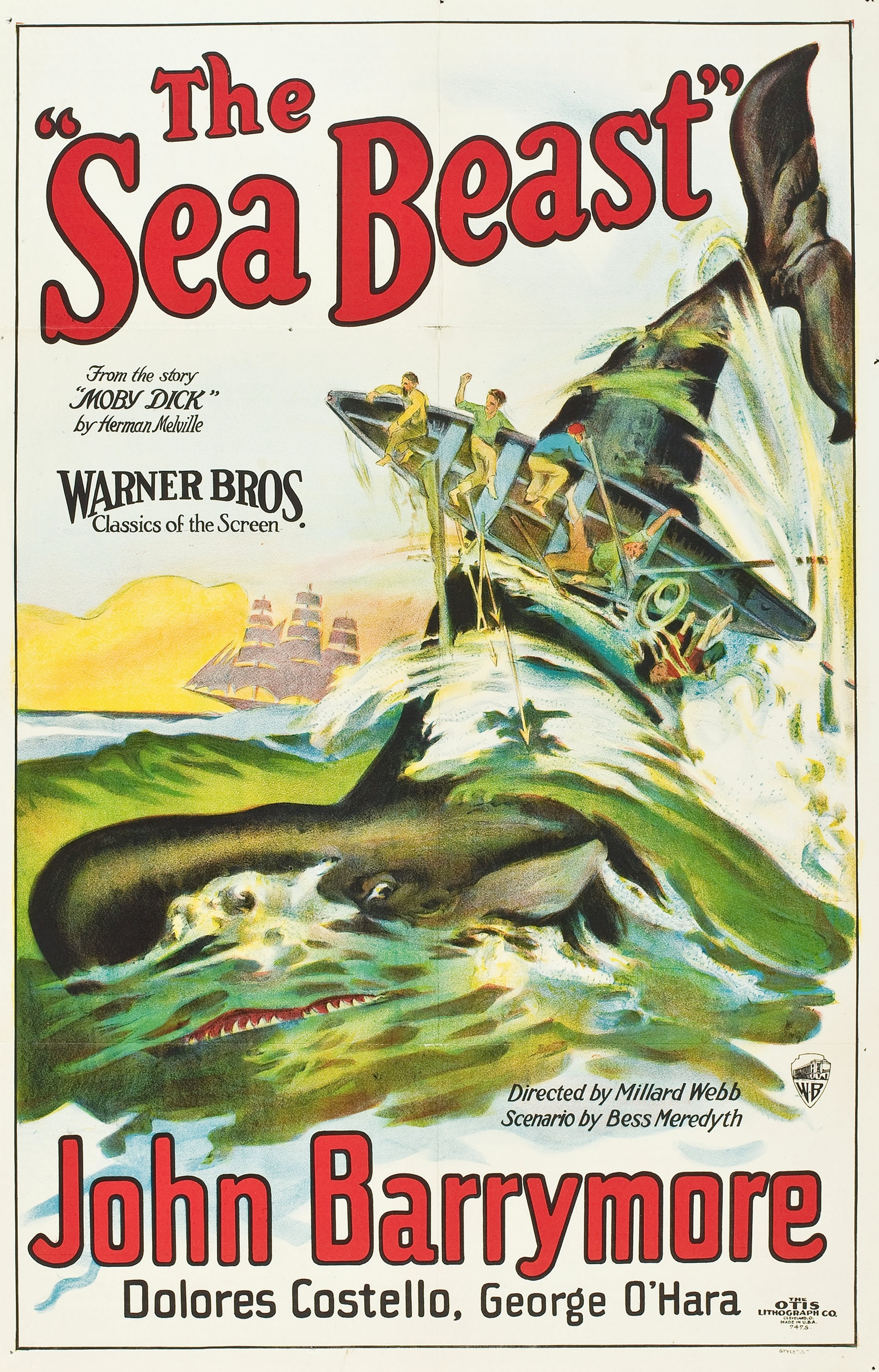
- Film poster
- Directed by: Millard Webb
- Written by: Bess Meredyth; Rupert Hughes; Jack Wagner
- Based on: Moby-Dick (1851) by Herman Melville
- Starring: John Barrymore; Dolores Costello; George O'Hara
- Cinematography: Byron Haskin; Frank Kesson
- Edited by: Rupert Hughes
- Production company: Warner Bros.
- Distributed by: Warner Bros.(US); Gaumont Warner Brothers (Europe)
- Release date: January 15, 1926
- Running time: 100 minutes
- Country: United States
- Language: Silent (English intertitles)
- Budget: $503,000
- Box office: $938,000 (worldwide rentals)

The full film

The Sea Beast is a 1926 American silent drama film directed by Millard Webb, starring John Barrymore, Dolores Costello and George O'Hara. The film was a major commercial success and one of the biggest pictures of 1926 becoming Warner Brothers' highest-grossing film at the time. The Sea Beast is the first adaptation of Herman Melville's 1851 novel Moby-Dick, a story about a monomaniacal hunt for a great white whale. However, the film alters the novel's plotline by establishing prequel and sequel elements that are not in the original story—such as the romancing of Esther and Ahab's safe return, respectively—and substitutes a happy ending for Melville's original tragic one. Some of the characters in the film do not appear in Melville's original novel. The film was so successful that in 1930 Warner Bros redid it in English and German, under the title Moby Dick, with Joan Bennett taking the role of Ahab's love because Dolores Costello was pregnant at the time.

== Plot ==
At the beginning of the story, Ahab and his half brother Derek compete for the affections of a winsome minister's daughter, Esther Wiscasset. Meanwhile, an albino whale has been eluding harpooners, and bears the scars of many failed attacks against him. The animal's fame has reached epic proportions. One day, Ahab and Derek are on the same whaler as the whale heaves into view. Ahab raises his harpoon to kill the beast, but at that moment, Derek pushes him overboard and Ahab loses his right leg to the whale. Not long after this incident, the shallow Esther rebuffs Ahab as her suitor once she catches sight of his peg leg. Heartbroken at this turn of events, Ahab blames neither Esther nor his brother; instead he transfers blame and an undying hatred onto the whale. The following saga of Ahab's pursuit of the whale takes on the aura of a super-human quest, far beyond the proportions of its first motivation.

== Cast ==
- John Barrymore as Captain Ahab Ceeley
- Dolores Costello as Esther Harper
- George O'Hara as Derek Ceeley
- Mike Donlin as Flask
- Sam Baker as Queequeg
- Sōjin Kamiyama as Fedallah
- George Berrell as Perth/As Himself
- Sam Allen as Captain
- Frank Nelson as Stubbs
- Mathilde Comont as Mula
- James O. Barrows as Rev. Harper
- Vadim Uraneff as Pip
- Frank Hagney as Daggoo
- Joyzelle Joyner as Dancer in prologue

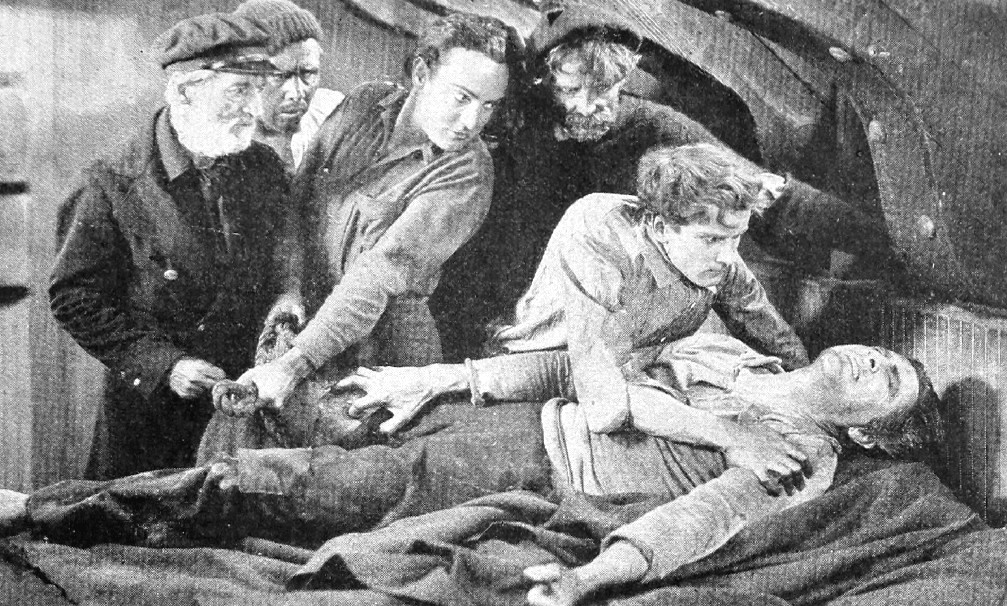
Scene from The Sea Beast

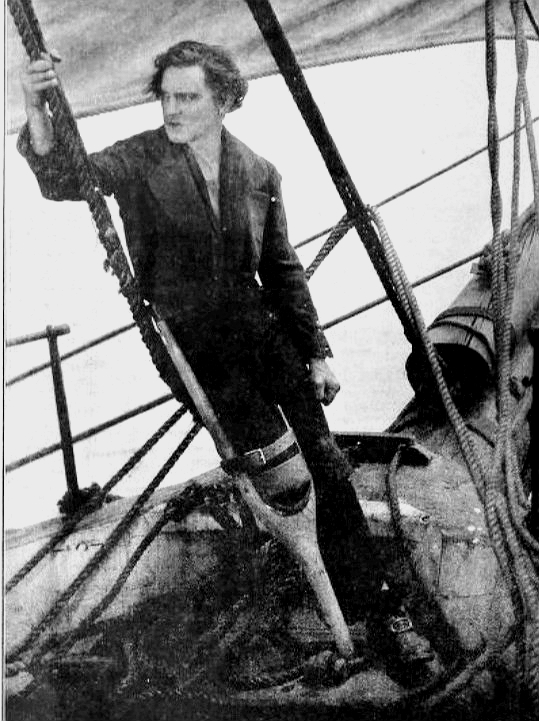
A still from The Sea Beast

== Production ==
John Barrymore signed a three-film contract with Warner Brothers in 1925 after the success of 1924's Beau Brummel. Barrymore had always wanted to do a film version of Moby-Dick and insisted on making this film first rather than the prospected first contract film Don Juan. In retrospect and because of this delay, Don Juan became the first Warner feature to have the Vitaphone soundtrack rather than The Sea Beast.

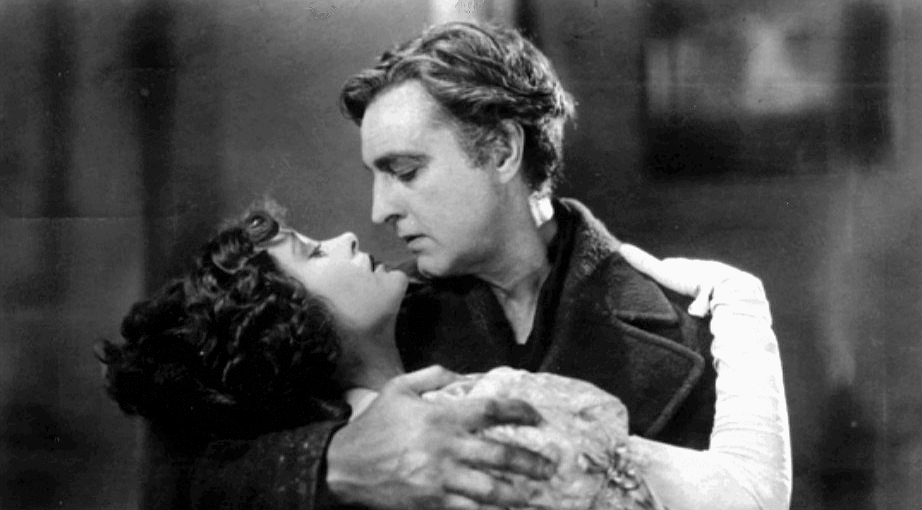
Barrymore and Costello

One of the most popular of Barrymore's films, this version extends the story beyond the final battle of man versus whale in a variation on Melville's book. Adding publicity to the film was a bit of early Hollywood hype, unintentional though it may seem: the actress Priscilla Bonner was fired by Barrymore from the role of Esther Harper, in preference for his lover, actress Dolores Costello, and Bonner successfully sued the studio and won a considerable out-of-court settlement. Barrymore exploited the romantic scenes with Costello to their full potential in the film, displaying a "boyish enthusiasm" according to biographer Margot Peters, which made him fall out with Costello's mother. Barrymore drank heavily during the production of the film, and his eyes were constantly bloodshot, with stubble on his chin. Producer Jack L. Warner said "that's a great makeup job" to director Millard Webb, who retorted, "That's not makeup. It's a hangover". The ship used in the film, The Narwhal, was actually a former fighting ship with decks stained with blood from fights. The theme in the orchestral score is "Love's Old Sweet Song".

Due to the success of this film, an all-talking version was released in 1930 under Melville's original book title, with Barrymore again in the role of Captain Ahab. The 1930 film used the plotline of The Sea Beast rather than following Melville's novel. A German-language version, Daemon des Mers, was filmed simultaneously in Hollywood by Warner Bros. It was directed by William Dieterle, beginning his American career.

== Reception ==
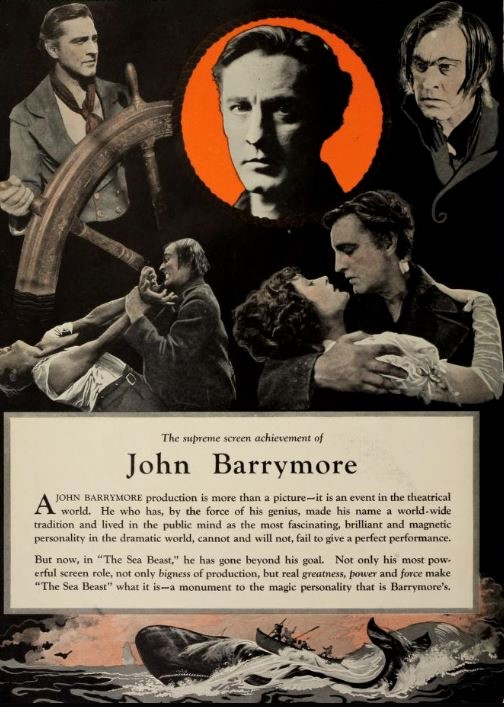
A trade ad for The Sea Beast

The Sea Beast proved to be "extremely popular" with the public, and was generally well received by critics when released in January 1926. The romantic scenes between Barrymore and Costello were particularly well received. Douglas Fairbanks, Jr., whose father was an old friend of Barrymore's, said he saw the film half a dozen times. The New Castle News of Pennsylvania called it a "remarkable picture" which "represents the finest in motion picture art", considering it to be the biggest picture of the year. The Post-Crescent of Appleton, Wisconsin heavily praised the cast and cinematography, referring to it as "a picture of rich, colorful beauty of heart-searing pathos, of poetry that sings in action of courageous deeds of emotions as violent and eternal as the terrific storms that sweep through the picture".

Mordaunt Hall of The New York Times devoted almost two columns to a review that detailed much of the unfamiliar plot. He found Costello's performance “praiseworthy” noted the "energy, earnestness and virility" John Barrymore displayed in the role of Ahab Ceeley, stating that his "real triumph in this photoplay comes in the second half of the picture, for he has a great opportunity as the grim master of a whaler with a mixed crew of half-mad yellow, white and black scum". Hall praised the effectiveness of the scene in which the stump of Ahab's leg is cauterized, noting that several women in the audience found the scene hard to take. He believed that the exploits with the whale were not as effective as they could have been, concluding that "this is a good production and one which contains much interest, but it is not a great photoplay".

Photoplay magazine wrote: "John Barrymore gives his usual finished performance. His agony is almost too realistic in the scene wherein the sailors cauterize the bloody stump of the leg torn off by the sea beast. It's too gruesome for the sensitive souls... Dolores Costello's beauty is a delight to behold, and her acting is unbelievably good for a comparative newcomer. The scene in which she first sees the havoc wrought upon her lover by the white whale reaches artistic heights that leave one trembling. And the scene is perfect pictorially." However, Movie Monthly was less enthusiastic about the film, declaring that it "does not come up to expectations, principally because its story turns out to be quite preposterous".

== Preservation ==
The film survives intact and was broadcast on television in the 1950s. The film is listed as being held by several archives around the world. It is available on DVD from Televista. In May 2021 the film and a large poster became available on Alpha Video.

== See also ==
- List of American films of 1926
- John Barrymore filmography

== Bibliography ==
- Nichols, Bill (January 1, 1985). Movies and Methods: An Anthology. University of California Press. ISBN 978-0-520-05409-7.
- Peters, Margot (1990). The House of Barrymore. New York, NY: A.A. Knopf. pp. 641. ISBN 978-0-6717-4799-2.
- Slide, Anthony (February 25, 2014). The New Historical Dictionary of the American Film Industry. Routledge. ISBN 978-1-135-92554-3.
