= Sam Baker (actor) =

American actor

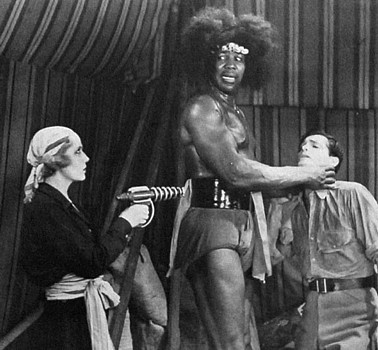
- Sam Baker as Hugo in The Lost City (1935)
- Born: 7 May 1907; Taylor, Indiana, United States
- Died: 8 May 1982 (aged 75); Abilene, Kansas, United States
- Occupation: Actor

Sam Baker (Taylor, Indiana; 7 May 1907– Abilene, Kansas; 8 May 1982), born Samuel D. Baker, was an American actor who usually performed with Rudolph Valentino, Ramon Novarro, Harold Lloyd and Charlie Chaplin.

== Career ==
This Indiana-born actor played the Link in the film The Missing Link (1927), whose imposing presence made him a natural for early jungle flicks. His most easily recalled role may have been Hugo in Sherman S. Krellberg's notorious serial The Lost City (1935). His most memorable role was Queequeg in The Sea Beast (1926).

Baker's filmography is brief, as the sound era saw him move quickly from featured roles as African chieftains to bits as black convicts. His first screen appearance was in a genre project: he was the sworder in Douglas Fairbanks' The Thief of Bagdad (1924). In John Barrymore's The Sea Beast, a silent Moby Dick, he played Queequeg. In the sound remake of The Island of Lost Ships (1929), he played himself and received the smallest mention.

He died in Abilene, Kansas, in early May 1982.

== Filmography ==
| Year | Title | Role | Notes |
|---|---|---|---|
| 1924 | The Thief of Bagdad | Sworder | Uncredited |
| 1926 | The Sea Beast | Queequeeq | |
| 1926 | The Road to Mandalay | Minor Role | Uncredited |
| 1927 | The Missing Link | The Missing Link | |
| 1929 | The Far Call | Tubal | |
| 1929 | The Isle of Lost Ships | Native Tribeman | |
| 1931 | Women of All Nations | Chief Eunuch | Uncredited |
| 1932 | Jungle Mystery | Zungu | Serial |
| 1933 | King of the Jungle | Gwana | |
| 1934 | Drums O' Voodoo | | |
| 1935 | Under Pressure | Iron Man | Uncredited |
| 1935 | The Lost City | Hugo | Serial |
| 1935 | Les Misérables | Black Convict | Uncredited |
| 1935 | Public Hero ﹟1 | Mose Jones | |
| 1935 | Steamboat Round the Bend | Minor Role | Uncredited, (final film role) |

== Bibliography ==
- Soister, John T.; Nicolella, Henry; Joyce, Steve (31 January 2013). American Silent Horror, Science Fiction and Fantasy Feature Films, 1913–1929. McFarland Publishing. p. 830. ISBN 9780786487905.
