= The Secret of Rosette Lambert =

1920 film directed by Raymond Bernard

Le Secret de Rosette Lambert (English: 'The Secret of Rosette Lamber')
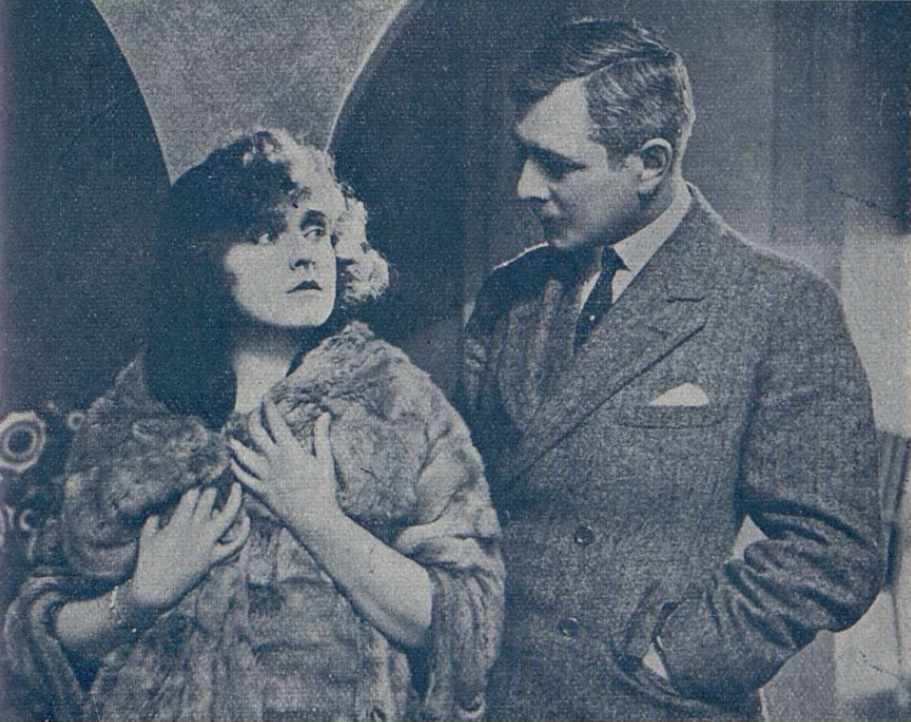
- Directed by: Raymond Bernard
- Produced by: Adolphe Osso
- Starring: Lois Meredith; Sylvia Grey; Paul Amiot; Camille Bert; Charles Dullin; Henri Debain; Jacques Roussel
- Release date: 1920
- Country: France
- Language: French

The Secret of Rosette Lambert (French: Le Secret de Rosette Lambert) is a 1920 French film directed by Raymond Bernard.

== Cast ==
- Lois Meredith as Rosette Lambert
- Sylvia Grey as Claire
- Paul Amiot as Lambert
- Camille Bert as Branchu
- Charles Dullin as Bertrand
- Henri Debain as James Janvier
- Jacques Roussel as Henri

== See also ==
- 1920 in films
