= The Lost City (1935 serial) =

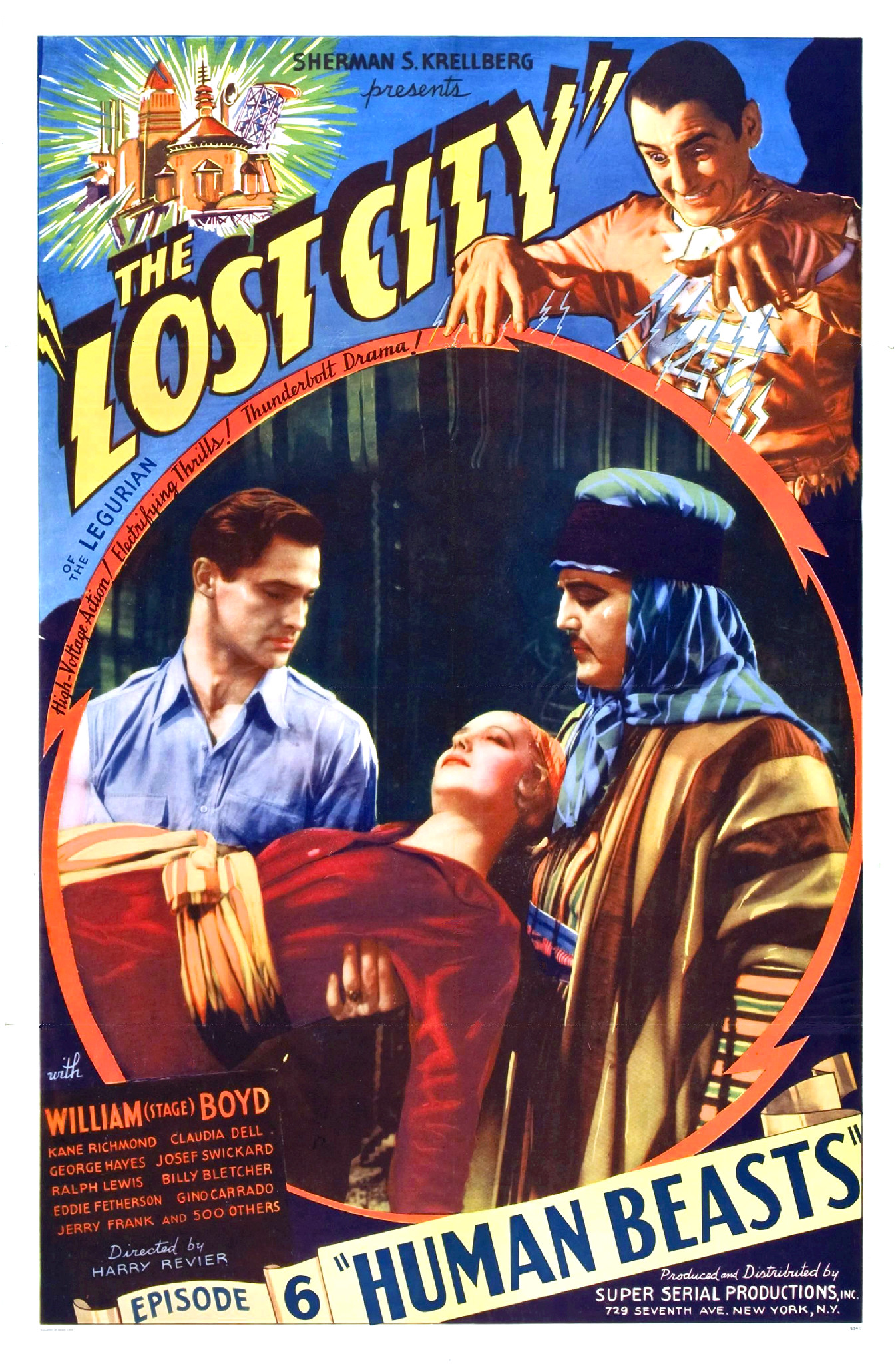
- Directed by: Harry Revier
- Written by: Zelma Carroll; Geo. M. Merrick; Robert Dillon; Eddie Granemann; Leon D'Usseau; Perley Sheehan
- Produced by: Sherman S. Krellberg
- Starring: William "Stage" Boyd; Kane Richmond; Claudia Dell; Josef Swickard
- Cinematography: Edward Linden; Roland Price
- Edited by: Holbrook Todd
- Distributed by: Super Serial Productions Inc.
- Release date: March 6, 1935
- Running time: 12 chapters (240 minutes)
- Country: United States
- Language: English

The full film

The Lost City is an independently made 12 chapter science fiction film serial created and produced in 1935 by Sherman S. Krellberg and directed by Harry Revier.

== Plot ==
Scientist Bruce Gordon comes to a secluded area in Africa after concluding that a series of electrically induced natural disasters had originated from in the area. There he finds the crazed Zolok, last of the Lemurians, in a secret complex inside a mountain.

Zolok had created the natural disasters as a prelude to his attempt to take over the world, holding a brilliant scientist, Dr. Manyus, there hostage, along with his daughter, Natcha. He had forced Manyus to create mindless "giant" slaves out of the natives as a private army and as the serial progresses we learn Manyus also turned another tribe, the spider-worshipping Wangas, into thin, impotent whites. Gordon helps Manyus and his daughter to escape Zolok, but they encounter Ben Ali, a malignant slave trader; meet the sexy native Queen Rama, who tries to help them; and survive harrowing jungle adventures before returning to the Lost City and stopping Zolok's plan.

== Cast ==
- William "Stage" Boyd as Zolok
- Kane Richmond as Bruce Gordon
- Claudia Dell as Natcha Manyus
- Josef Swickard as Dr. Manyus
- Eddie Fetherston as Jerry Delaney
- George F. Hayes as Butterfield
- Billy Bletcher as Gorzo
- Jerry Frank as Apollon
- Gino Corrado as Ben Ali
- Margot D'Use as Queen Rama
- Sam Baker as Hugo.

== Chapter titles ==
1. "Living Dead-Men" (27 min, 51 s)
2. "The Tunnel of Flame" (20 min, 42 s)
3. "Dagger Rock" (19 min, 52 s)
4. "Doomed" (18 min, 30 s)
5. "Tiger Prey" (19 min, 31 s)
6. "Human Beasts" (18 min, 25 s)
7. "Spider Men" (17 min, 4 s)
8. "Human Targets" (17 min, 36 s)
9. "Jungle Vengeance" (23 min, 4 s)
10. "The Lion Pit" (18 min, 21 s)
11. "Death Ray" (20 min, 31 s)
12. "The Mad Scientist" (18 min, 23 s)

_{Source:}

== Production ==
The film took the premise of that year's The Phantom Empire but transferred the lost civilization motif from the west to another popular serial locale, the African jungle.

== Feature-length versions ==
Sherman S. Krellberg had the serial edited into four different feature versions over time, perhaps setting a record for feature versions of a serial. The first feature consisted of the first three episodes of the serial and the first reel of the fourth episode edited together, and supplemented with footage not part of the serial itself which drew the adventure to a loose conclusion; and the second was compiled from material in the first and last four chapters of the serial, omitting the adventures with the slave traders, the spider people and Queen Rama, but ending as did the serial. Both these features were made and released in 1935 and both were also called The Lost City. The first of these was also designed so that it could be followed over successive weeks by the remaining chapters in the serial.

In the early '40s Krellberg created a new feature version that incorporated material from the adventures with the slavers, spider people and jungle queen, and released this under the title City of Lost Men. Finally, in the 1970s, he took the first feature version and clumsily edited in, at the end, most of the footage from the last chapter, creating what goes beyond a continuity gap and is rather a continuity abyss, and attached the City of Lost Men title to this feature.

It is not clear whether the last feature had an actual theatrical release or went directly to television. The first City of Lost Men appears to be lost, and videos and DVDs being sold under that title are sourced from film prints of this final feature. Since it incorporates the entire first feature version entitled Lost City, that film cannot fairly be said to be lost, although no separate video issue of that version under its own titles is known. Video/DVD offerings of The Lost City as a feature are from prints of the second feature version described.

== See also ==
- List of film serials
- List of film serials by studio
- List of films in the public domain in the United States
