= Spellbound (1916 film) =

- Directed by: Harry Harvey
- Written by: Bess Meredyth
- Produced by: E.D. Horkheimer; H.M. Horkheimer
- Starring: Lois Meredith; William Conklin; Bruce Smith
- Production company: Balboa Amusement Producing Company
- Distributed by: General Film Company
- Release date: May 17, 1916 (U.S.)
- Country: United States

Spellbound or The One-Eyed God, is a 1916 American crime drama silent black and white film directed by Harry Harvey and produced by E.D. Horkheimer and H.M. Horkheimer. It is written by Bess Meredyth.

With another numerous films, Spellbound appropriated the medical, legal and literary tales of hypnotic crime. Oscar Cooper, in his review for Motion Picture News, doesn't bother to comment the story and acting and he offers some praise for the lighting and photography. The Salt Lake Tribune claimed that the fantastic story did not preclude at least one nod to reality.

== Cast ==
- Lois Meredith as Elsie York
- William Conklin as Harrington Graeme
- Bruce Smith as Major Cavendish
- Edward J. Brady as Katti Hab
- Frank Erlanger as Mematu
- Edward Peters as Azetic
- R. Henry Grey as Graham
