= The Greater Will =

1915 silent film

- Directed by: Harley Knoles
- Written by: Harley Knoles
- Starring: Cyril Maude; Lois Meredith; Montagu Love
- Production company: Premo Film Company
- Distributed by: Pathe Exchange
- Release date: December 10, 1915
- Running time: 50 minutes
- Country: United States
- Languages: Silent; English intertitles

The Greater Will is a 1915 American silent drama film directed by Harley Knoles and starring Cyril Maude, Lois Meredith and Montagu Love.

== Cast ==
- Cyril Maude as Professor Cornelius Sloane
- Lois Meredith as Peggy Sloane
- Montagu Love as Stuart Watson
- Henry Carvill as Father Malone
- William T. Carleton as Edward Carson
- Charles H. France
- Margot Williams
- Lionel Belmore
- Walter Craven

== Bibliography ==
- Soister, John T., Nicolella, Henry & Joyce, Steve. American Silent Horror, Science Fiction and Fantasy Feature Films, 1913-1929. McFarland, 2014.
