= The Road to Mandalay (1926 film) =

1926 American film

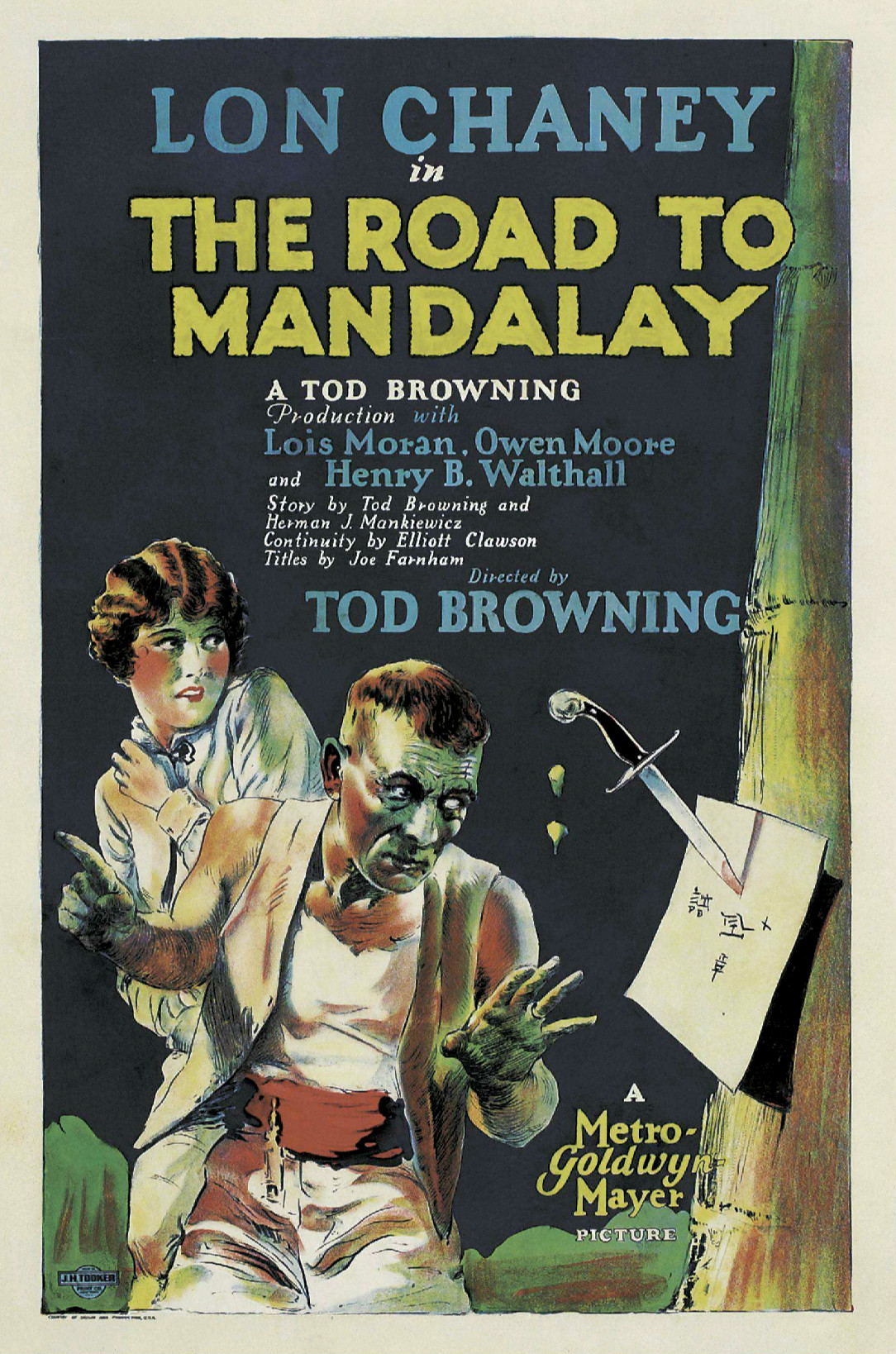
- Film poster
- Directed by: Tod Browning
- Written by: Elliott J. Clawson (screenplay); Joseph Farnham (titles); Herman J. Mankiewicz (story)
- Story by: Tod Browning
- Produced by: Irving Thalberg
- Starring: Lon Chaney; Lois Moran; Owen Moore; Henry B. Walthall; John George
- Cinematography: Merritt B. Gerstad
- Edited by: Errol Taggart
- Distributed by: MGM
- Release date: June 28, 1926
- Running time: 70 minutes; 7 reels (2,000 meters)
- Country: United States
- Language: Silent (English intertitles)
- Budget: $209,000
- Box office: $724,000

Full film

The Road to Mandalay is a 1926 American silent drama film directed by Tod Browning and starring Lon Chaney, Owen Moore, and Lois Moran. It was written by Elliott Clawson (with Joseph Farmham doing the intertitles), based on a story idea by Tod Browning and Herman Mankiewicz. The script's original shooting title was Singapore. The film took 28 days to complete at a cost of $209,000. The worldwide box office gross was $724,000. Some stills exist showing Chaney's makeup as Singapore Joe.

Originally a 7-reel feature, the film was considered lost until a 9.5mm abridged version, of about 35 minutes, with French intertitles surfaced in Paris and was transferred to 16mm. This fair quality French abridgement is all that survives of The Road to Mandalay. The intertitles were translated back into English, and the print now resides in the Warner Brothers Classics Vault.

Archivist Jon Mirsalis (who restored the film) opined, "The English-to-French-back-to-English intertitles lost something in the translation, but I was able to restore the original intertitles from the original MGM cutting continuity. After all that work, one would like to say that the finished product is a great film waiting to be rediscovered. Sadly, it is not. THE ROAD TO MANDALAY is probably the worst of the Chaney/Browning features done at MGM. It is predominantly style with little substance, and even lacks many of the odd Browning touches that add to most of his other pictures of the era. Still, Chaney's make-up and performance are fascinating to watch. He . . . used collodion to form a deep gash across his forehead, and put several large tattoos on his arms. He spends much of the film sneering and growling, and comes across as one of the most distasteful characters of his career."

Dr. Hugo Kiefer, a Los Angeles optician, designed the white glass contact lens that Chaney wore to simulate the blind eye. Two of these contact lenses can still be found in Chaney's make-up case at the Natural History Museum in Los Angeles.

== Plot ==
Singapore Joe is a captain on board a ship bound for Mandalay with his wife, who lies gravely ill in her cabin. His wife dies giving birth to a daughter, and the Captain leaves the child in the care of his brother Father James, a priest who raises the girl as his own. Twenty years pass, and the captain is now a hardened criminal with a blind eye who runs a Singapore brothel along with a vile Chinese associate named English Charlie Wing. A third partner in their shady dealings is known as "The Admiral," a fallen young man who was once a well-to-do Englishman.

Whenever he finds himself in Mandalay, Joe has always makes a point of visiting his daughter, who is an adult now and runs a religious curio shop in town. She does not know that Joe is her father and is repulsed by the crude one-eyed man whenever he stops by. The Admiral wanders into her shop one day and he and she become romantically involved. Joe tells Father James that he is thinking of cleaning up his act, and wants to turn over a new leaf and take his daughter away to start a new life together, but the priest warns him that he already has too many sins on his soul weighing him down. Joe learns that his daughter is planning to get married, and on the day of the wedding, he sneaks inside the church, and is shocked to find that her intended husband-to-be is "The Admiral".

Joe prevents the priest from carrying out the ceremony, then his men kidnap The Admiral and smuggle him back to Joe's whorehouse in Singapore. The girl suspects Joe has abducted her fiancé and travels to the brothel to rescue him. Charlie Wing lures the young girl upstairs and is about to rape her when Joe enters and stops him. The Admiral arrives and fights with Joe, and during the fight the girl fatally stabs Joe, not realizing he is her father. Joe tells The Admiral to take her far away, and he holds Charlie Wing at bay while the two lovers escape. Father James arrives just in time to see Singapore Joe die from his knife wound.

== Cast ==
- Lon Chaney as Singapore Joe
- Lois Moran as Joe's Daughter
- Owen Moore as The Admiral
- Henry B. Walthall as Father James
- Kamiyama Sojin as English Charlie Wing
- Rose Langdon as Pansy
- John George as Servant
- Eddie Sturgis as the Bartender
- Willie Fung as Chinese man in bar
- Lenore Bushman
- Virginia Bushman
- Robert Seiter
- Eric Mayne
- Sam Baker
- Margie and Mary Angus (uncredited)

== Critical comments ==
"It's a story of the underworld of Singapore. Chaney has another of those characteristic roles. This time, his deformity is a sightless white eye.... The picture is Chaney, who unquestionably has a big following...The picture undoubtedly will go over big. It appeals to the modern taste for what is called 'morbid,' but which nowadays is spoken of as 'sensational.'" --- Variety

"In an intensely dramatic story, Lon Chaney...again demonstrates that he is without a peer as a genius of make-up... THE ROAD TO MANDALAY is one of the most stirringly dramatic and virile that Chaney has ever had and adds another laurel to his masterful characterizations." --- Moving Picture World

"There is, for instance, Lon Chaney, whose performance is not to be compared with his acting in other films. This picture is quite tedious, and it strikes one that Mr. Browning did not quite know what to do with the players in a number of scenes." --- The New York Times

"Not much as a story, but lifted to melodramatic interest by the highly colored performance of Lon Chaney as Singapore Joe. Chaney affects another of those bizarre make-ups." --- Photoplay

"For the kind of story it is, it is perfect and Browning deserves only praise. I was beginning to wonder if Lon Chaney could really act, but this picture cleared away any doubt. He can!" --- Film Spectator

"Exceptionally fine direction and great acting...Chaney is splendid as usual." --- Film Daily

"This picture cannot be called any "great shakes". Chaney saves it however. He appears as a one-eyed derelict of Singapore who rises from the depths only whenever he comes in contact with his pure and undefiled offspring....a girl reared in the sanctuary of sweetness and light." --- Motion Picture Magazine
