= The Headless Horseman (1922 film) =

1922 film

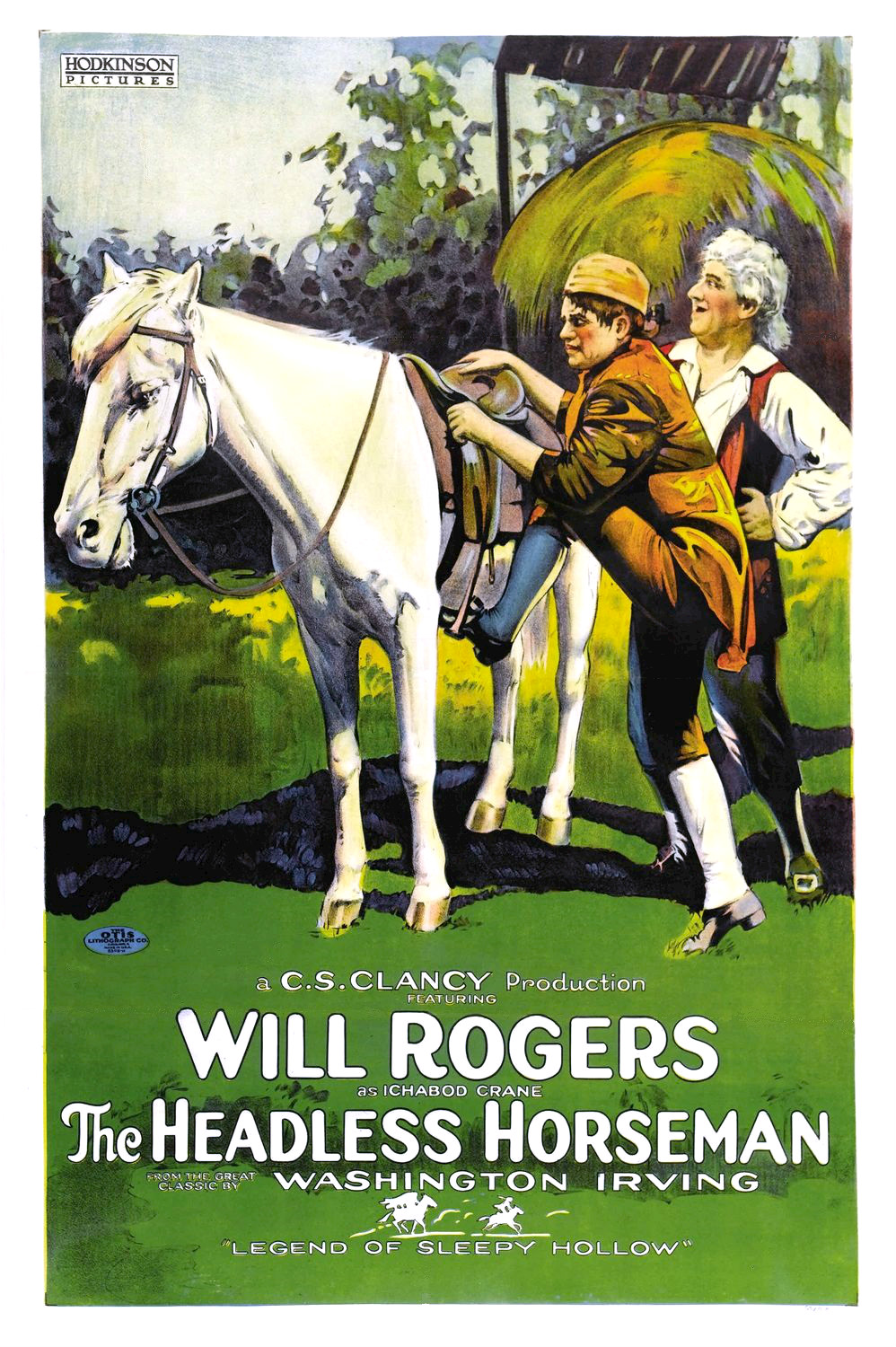
- Film poster
- Directed by: Edward D. Venturini
- Written by: Carl Stearns Clancy
- Based on: The Legend of Sleepy Hollow by Washington Irving
- Produced by: Carl Stearns Clancy
- Starring: Will Rogers; Lois Meredith; Ben Hendricks Jr.
- Cinematography: Ned Van Buren
- Production company: Sleepy Hollow Corporation
- Distributed by: W. W. Hodkinson Corporation
- Release date: November 5, 1922
- Running time: 68 minutes
- Country: United States
- Language: Silent (English intertitles)

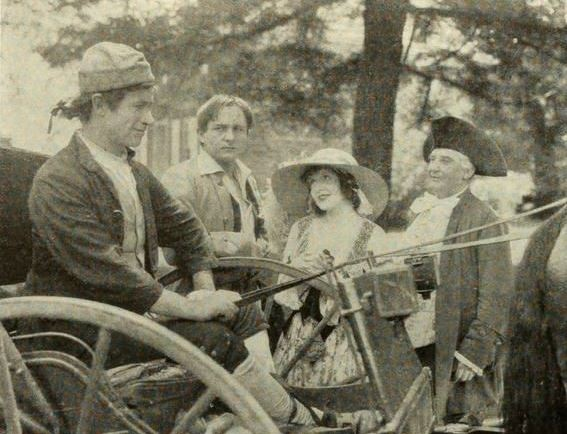
Film still with Will Rogers and Lois Meredith

The Headless Horseman is a 1922 American silent film adaptation of Washington Irving's 1820 short story "The Legend of Sleepy Hollow" directed by Edward D. Venturini. It stars Will Rogers, Lois Meredith (in her last major on-screen appearance) and Ben Hendricks Jr. It was the first panchromatic black-and-white feature film.

There were three silent film adaptations of the story, but this 1922 version is the longest of the three, as well as the only one that survives today. Film critic Christopher Workman states: "The obvious day-for-night shooting foreshadows the work of Edward D. Wood Jr. [The film] is a motion picture that wavers between irritating and flat-out dull." He says the Headless Horseman only appears in two all-too-brief sequences in the film, once at the beginning and again in the finale.

== Plot ==
The village of Sleepy Hollow, New York is getting ready to greet the new schoolteacher, Ichabod Crane, who is coming from New York. Crane has already heard of the village's legendary ghost, a headless horseman who is said to be searching for the head that he lost in battle.

The schoolteacher has barely arrived when he begins to pursue the beautiful young heiress Katrina Van Tassel, angering Abraham Van Brunt (aka "Brom Bones"), who was courting her. Crane's harsh, small-minded approach to teaching also turns some of the villagers against him. Soon, there are many who would like to see him leave the village altogether.

Brom Bones trashes the schoolhouse and tries to make it look like witches allied with Ichabod Crane caused the destruction.

== Cast ==
- Will Rogers as Ichabod Crane
- Lois Meredith as Katrina Van Tassel
- Ben Hendricks Jr. as Abraham Van Brunt ("Brom Bones")
- Charles E. Graham as Hans Van Ripper
- Mary Foy as Dame Martling
- Bernard A. Reinold as Baltus Van Tassel
- Downing Clarke as Dominie Heckwelder
- Jerry Devine as Adrian Van Ripper
- James Sheridan as Jethro Martling
- Kay MacCausland as Elsa Vanderdonck
- Nancy Chase as Gretchen

== Production ==
The stern schoolmaster Ichabod Crane, who at one point beats a student, was played by Rogers, a popular actor playing against his typical roles for which he received $19,583.20. For authenticity, filming took place in the Hudson River Valley around Tarrytown, New York, the setting of Washington Irving's story, with its Dutch farm houses and covered bridges.

The Headless Horseman was the first black-and-white feature film photographed entirely on panchromatic stock, which, while two to three times more expensive, did not have the tendency to turn blue eyes and skies white and lipstick as black like the commonly used orthochromatic film did. One effective special effect was the use of a double exposure to give the headless horseman a phantom-like appearance.

== Preservation ==
Copies of The Headless Horseman exist in several collections and it has been released on DVD. Alpha Video released the movie in a double-feature with Italian film The Mechanical Man (1921).
