= Help Wanted (1915 film) =

1915 film by Hobart Bosworth

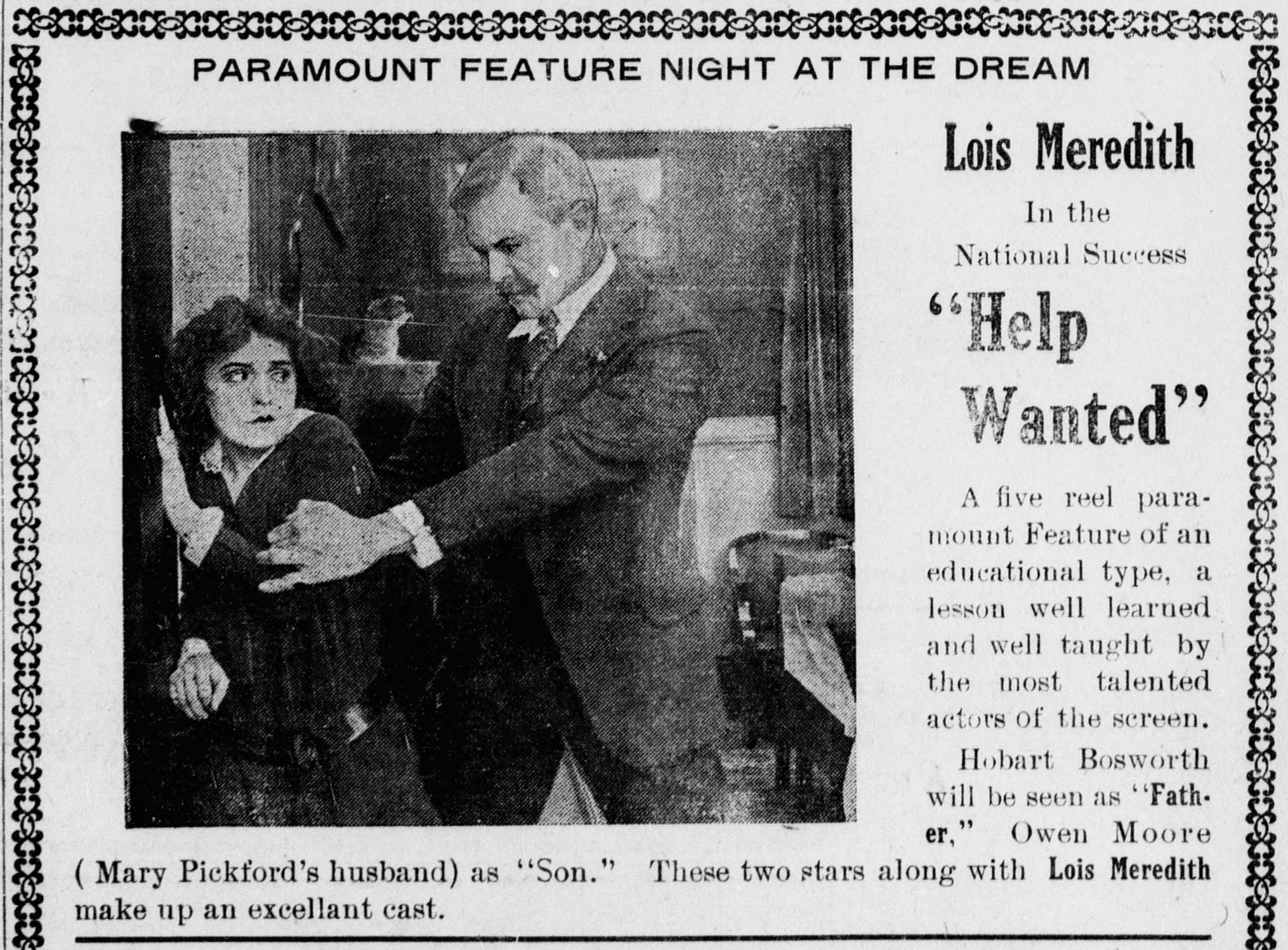
- Newspaper advertisement
- Directed by: Hobart Bosworth
- Screenplay by: Elmer Blaney Harris; Jack Lait
- Produced by: Hobart Bosworth
- Starring: Hobart Bosworth; Lillian Elliott; Adele Farrington; Lois Meredith; Owen Moore; Herbert Standing; Myrtle Stedman
- Production companies: Hobart Bosworth Productions; Oliver Morosco Photoplay Company
- Distributed by: Paramount Pictures
- Release date: April 29, 1915
- Country: United States
- Language: English

Help Wanted is a 1915 American drama silent film directed by Hobart Bosworth and written by Elmer Blaney Harris and Jack Lait. The film stars Hobart Bosworth, Lillian Elliott, Adele Farrington, Lois Meredith, Owen Moore, Herbert Standing and Myrtle Stedman. The film was released on April 19, 1915, by Paramount Pictures.

== Plot ==
Jerrold D. Scott, a New York importer, takes him with him as a partner in his firm after his stepson Jack finishes college. On the first day, the young man meets Gertie, the daughter of a poor washerwoman, who has come to have a job interview as a stenographer. Jerrold, who notices the girl for her beauty, decides to hire her and sets her a higher pay than she asks. Gertie is not a great stenographer and Jerrold seems increasingly interested in her, despite the fact that she does not appreciate all his attention. On the contrary, Jack falls in love with the girl and begins to think about marriage. One evening, Jerrold keeps Gertie in the office after hours. Left alone, the man attacks her. The girl's screams bring Jack who has to break the glass door to stop his stepfather. Jerrold, unaware that the young man is in love with Gertie, throws him out of the office and fires him. However, when he discovers that neither the girl nor Jack has said anything to his wife, he regrets his behavior and resumes his stepson to work with him, even agreeing to his marriage to Gertie.

== Cast ==
- Hobart Bosworth as Jerrold D. Scott
- Lillian Elliott as Mrs. Meyers
- Adele Farrington as Mrs. Jerrold Scott
- Lois Meredith as Gertie Meyers
- Owen Moore as Jack Scott
- Herbert Standing as Crane
- Myrtle Stedman as Miss Wiggins
- Carl von Schiller as Paul Montgomery
- Helen Wolcott as Josephine Scott
