= On the Quiet =

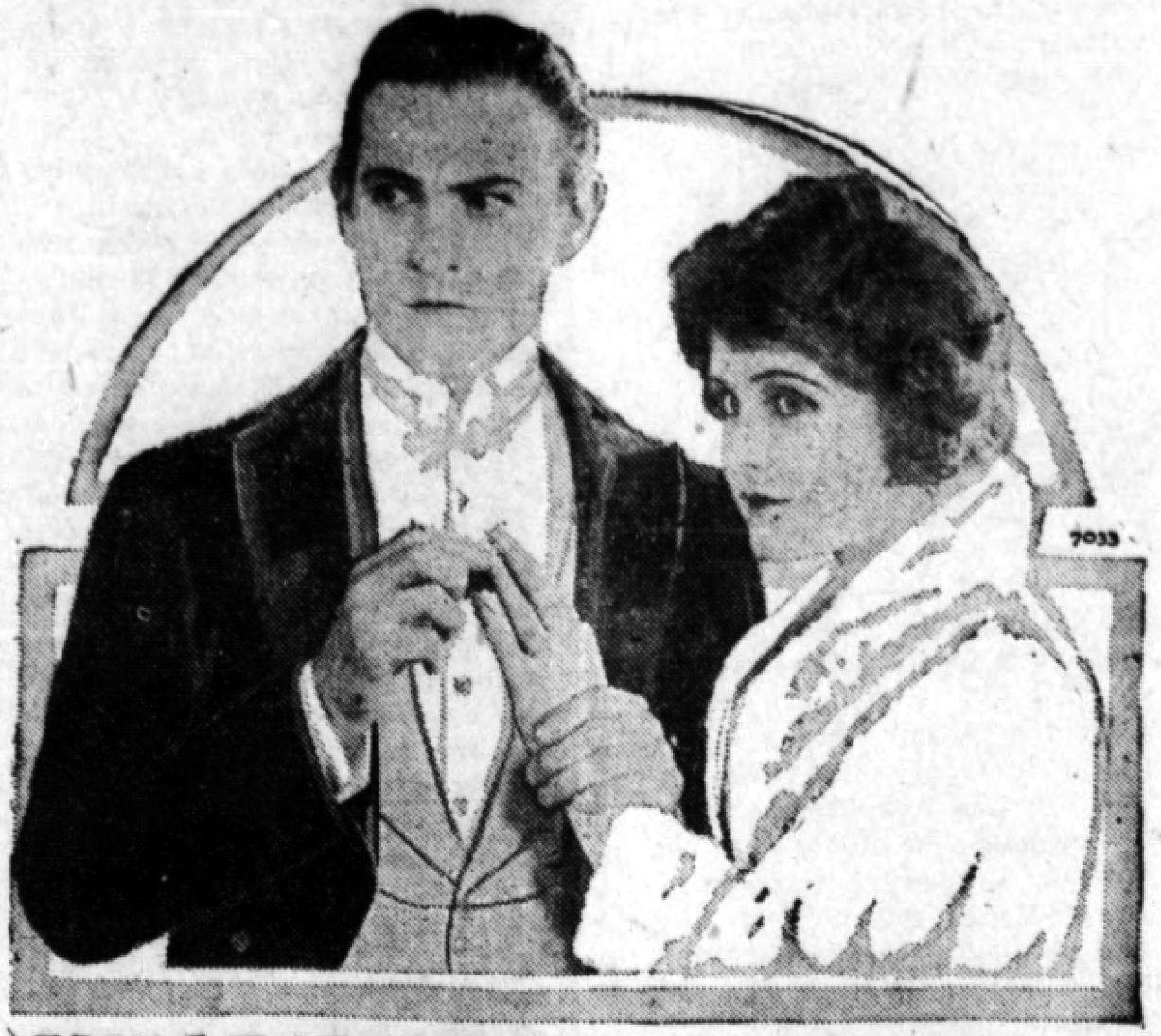
- Contemporary newspaper publicity
- Directed by: Chester Withey
- Written by: Augustus Thomas (play); Charles E. Whittaker (scenario)
- Produced by: Adolph Zukor; Jesse Lasky
- Starring: John Barrymore
- Cinematography: William Marshall
- Distributed by: Paramount Pictures
- Release date: September 1, 1918
- Running time: 5 reels; 4,549 feet
- Country: United States
- Language: Silent (English intertitles)

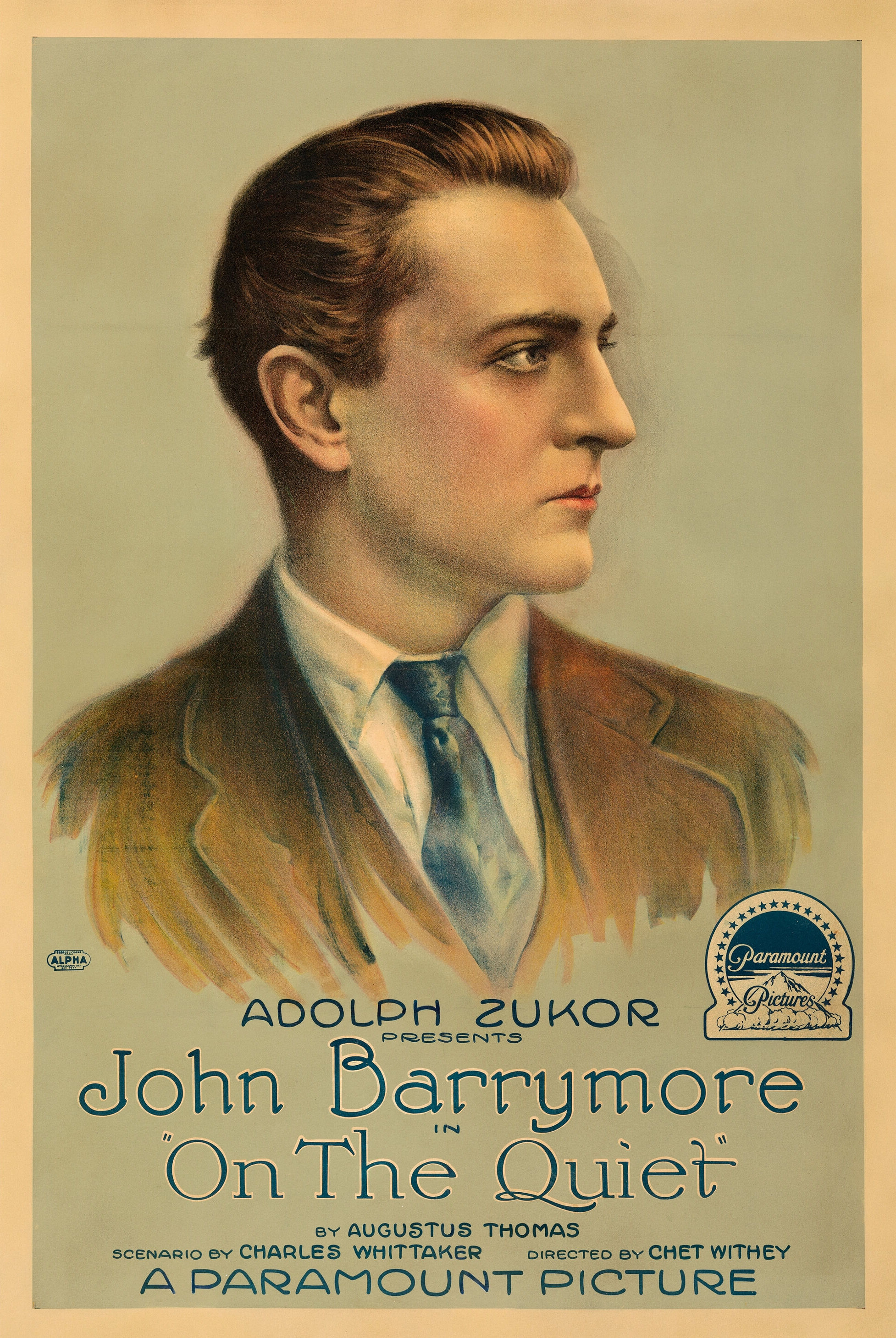
lobby poster. The left profile is actually printed backwards.

On the Quiet is a lost 1918 American silent comedy film produced by Famous Players–Lasky and released by Paramount Pictures. It was directed by Chester Withey and starred John Barrymore. The film, based on an original 1901 play, was written by Augustus Thomas and served as a popular hit for William Collier Sr.

== Plot ==
As described in a film magazine, Robert Ridgway is in love with Agnes Colt, but her brother who is the guardian of her estate objects to Robert's wild escapades. They are married on the quiet. Robert goes back to college and promises to be good. Agnes's sister is jealous of her husband, a Duke, and to test their love the Duke holds a party in Robert's room. Agnes visits Robert while the party is in progress, and when her brother discovers her absence he goes to hunt her up. Robert and Agnes escape to a life saving station, don diving helmets, and hide at the bottom of the sea. Meanwhile, McGeachy, who was a witness at the wedding, explains everything.

== Cast ==
- John Barrymore as Robert Ridgway
- Lois Meredith as Agnes Colt
- Frank Losee as Judge Ridgway
- J.W. Johnston as Horace Colt
- Alfred Hickman as Hix
- Helen Greene as Ethel Colt
- Cyril Chadwick as Duke of Carbonddale
- Frank Belcher as McGeachy
- Nan Christy as Chorus Girl
- Dell Boone as Chorus Girl
- Dan Mason as Clerk
- Frank Hilton as Secretary
- Otto Okuga as Valet
- Louise Lee as Maid

== See also ==
- List of lost films
- John Barrymore filmography
