= Sherman S. Krellberg =

American film producer

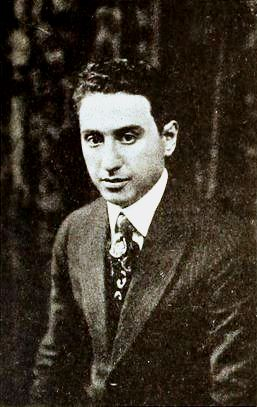

Samuel Sherman Krellberg (1892 - 1979) was a film distributor and producer in the United States. The Library of Congress has a collection of his papers. He distributed films nationally under various corporate names including Regal Talking Pictures, Super Serial Productions, Goodwill Pictures and Ultra Pictures. His mainstay business, however was the New York "states rights" (regional) Principal Film Exchange, which he acquired from Sol Lesser in 1936.

Krellberg also produced several plays. He and John Wildberg established a fund for theatrical productions.

== Filmography ==
- The Fatal Fortune (1919)
- Broadway After Midnight (1927)
- Faithless Lover (1928)
- His Last Bullet (1928)
- When Lightning Strikes (1934)
- Outlaws' Highway, aka Fighting Fury (1934)
- Man's Best Friend (1935)
- Lost City (1935), a science fiction serial also distributed in 3 different feature versions.
- The Eagle's Brood (originally 1935), a post-War reissue
- Bar 20 Rides Again (originally 1935), a post-War reissue
- Thunderbolt (1936 film)
- Rocket Ship (1938 film) (1949), the feature version of the Universal serial Flash Gordon (serial), which had previously only been exhibited abroad.
- Planet Outlaws (1952), a Krellberg-originated feature version of the serial Buck Rogers (serial)
