= Lois Meredith =

American actress

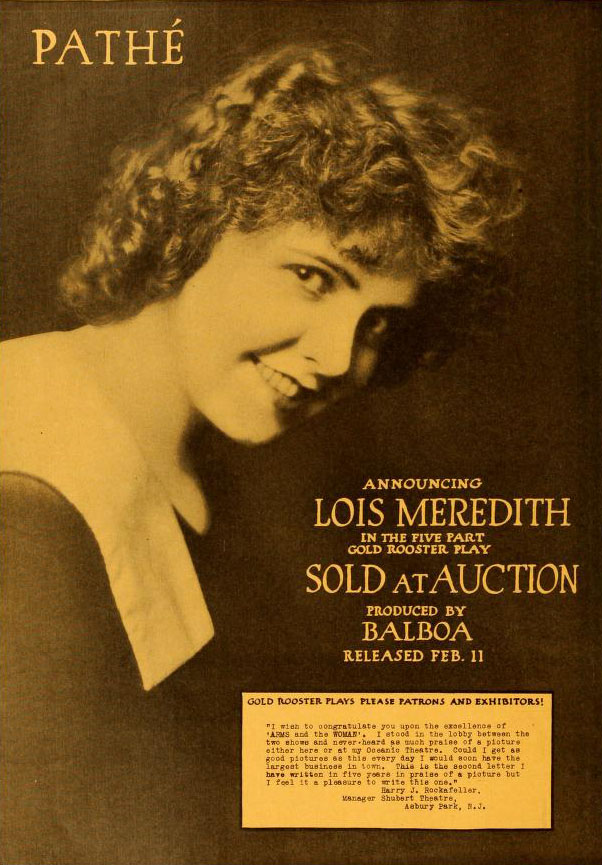
- Advertisement (1917)
- Born: June 26, 1897; Pittsburgh, Pennsylvania, U.S.
- Died: January 15, 1967 (aged 69)
- Other name: Loïs Mérédith
- Occupation: Actress
- Years active: 1911–1922, 1937

Lois Meredith (alternative styling Loïs Mérédith) (June 26, 1897 – January 15, 1967) was a silent film and theatre actress.

== Early years ==
Meredith was born in Pittsburgh, Pennsylvania.

== Career ==
She infrequently appeared on the Broadway stage from 1911 to 1926, appearing in The Duchess (1911), Help Wanted (1914), The Czarina (1922), and Number 7 (1926). Meredith appeared in 22 films, of which 21 were made between 1914 and 1922, with a 15-years gap before her final uncredited minor film role in 1937.

== Filmography ==
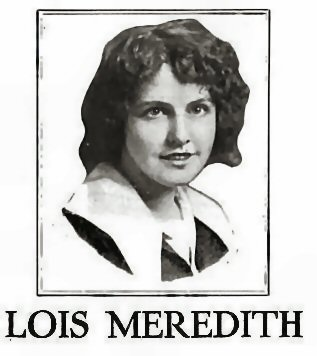
The Moving Picture World, August 14, 1915

- The Conspiracy (1914) as Margaret Holt
- Dan (1914) as Lila Dabney
- The Seats of the Mighty (1914) as Mathilde
- An Enemy to Society (1915) as Decima Duress
- The Greater Will (1915) as Peggy Sloane
- Help Wanted (1915) as Gertie Meyers
- The Legacy of Folly (1915) as Constance
- My Best Girl (1915) as Dora Lane
- The Woman (1915) as Wanda Kelly
- The Precious Parcel (also known as The Precious Packet) (1916) as Jacqueline Bourbon
- Spellbound (1916) as Elsie York
- The Girl Who Can Cook (1917)
- In the Hands of the Law (1917)
- Sold at Auction (1917) as Nan
- Her Mistake (1918) as Viola Shepard
- On the Quiet (1918) as Agnes Colt
- Over the Top (1918) as Helen Lloyd
- Autour du Mystère (1920)
- Le Secret de Rosette Lambert (also known as The Secret of Rosette Lambert) (1920) as Rosette Lambert
- L'Inconnue (1921) (as Loïs Mérédith)
- The Headless Horseman (1922) as Katrina Van Tassel
- Conquest (also known as Marie Walewska) (1937) as Countess Potocka (uncredited)
