= White Whale (disambiguation) =

White whale or beluga whale is an Arctic and sub-Arctic species of cetacean.

White Whale may also refer to:

- Mocha Dick, a notorious sperm whale killed in 1838.
- Moby Dick (whale), fictional whale partially inspired by Mocha
  - "White whale" as a byword for one's object of obsession
- White Whale (band), a band based in Lawrence, Kansas
- "White Whale" (Brooklyn Nine-Nine), 2018 TV sitcom episode
- "White Whale" (song), track on Everything Everything 2017 album A Fever Dream
- Operation White Whale, a 2005 international money-laundering ring
- White Whale Records, a defunct 1960s record label
- White Whale (Xenoblade Chronicles), a spaceship appearing in Xenoblade Chronicles X
- White whale, a mabeast creature in the 2016 anime series Re:Zero − Starting Life in Another World
- White Whales (film), 1987 Icelandic film

== See also ==
- Great White Whale, a 2008 album by Secret and Whisper
- Migaloo, a white humpback whale that frequents the Australian coastline
- Essex (1799 whaleship) whaler
- Narwhal
- Sperm whale
- Hakugei (disambiguation), Japanese word for “White Whale”
