= Moby Dick (whale) =

Fictional whale, namesake of the novel Moby-Dick

- Moby Dick character
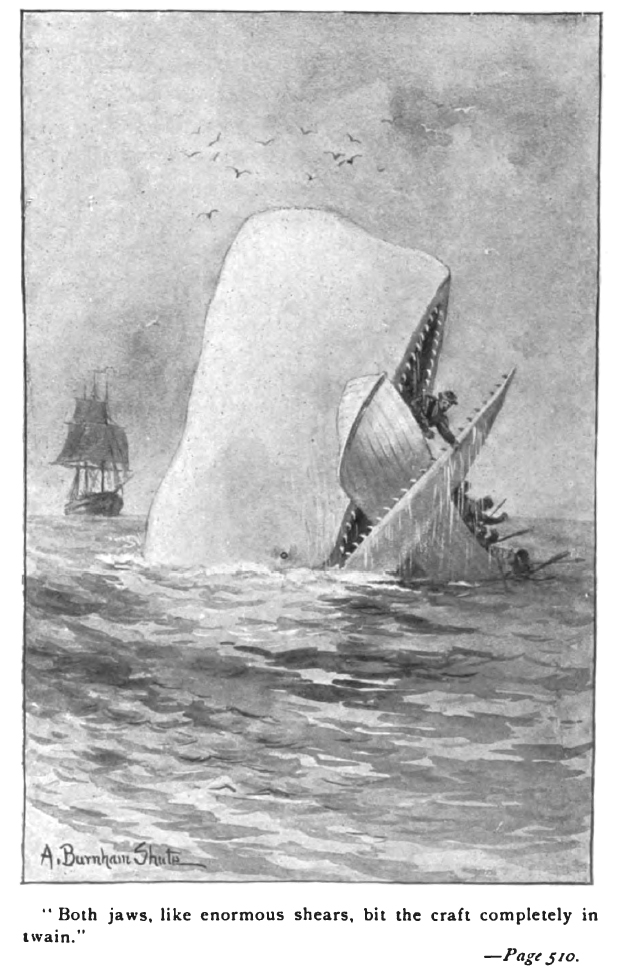
- Moby Dick with his head out of the water and breaking a boat in half with his jaws
- Created by: Herman Melville
- Based on: Mocha Dick

In-universe information
- Species: Sperm whale
- Gender: Male

Moby Dick is a fictional white sperm whale and the main antagonist in Herman Melville's 1851 novel of the same name. Melville based the sperm whale on a leucistic sperm whale of that period, Mocha Dick.

== Description ==
Ishmael describes Moby Dick as having two prominent white areas around "a peculiar snow-white wrinkled forehead, and a high, pyramidical white hump", the rest of his body being of stripes and patches between white and gray. The animal's exact dimensions are never given, but the novel claims that the largest sperm whales can reach a length of 90 ft (27 m) (larger than any officially recorded sperm whale) and that Moby Dick is possibly the largest sperm whale that ever lived. Ahab tells the crew that the White Whale can be told apart because he has an unusual spout, a deformed jaw, three punctures in his right fluke and several harpoons embedded in his side from unsuccessful hunts. Yet Ishmael insists that what invested the whale with "natural terror" was that "unexampled, intelligent malignity" which he had shown in his assaults. When he fled before "exalting pursuers", giving every symptom of alarm, he would suddenly turn round and stave their boats to splinters or drive them back to their ship. What seemed the White Whale's "infernal aforethought of ferocity" was that every dismembering or death that he caused was not wholly regarded as that of an "unintelligent agent". He bit off Ahab's leg, leaving Ahab to swear "wild vindictiveness" on him. Ishmael, however, is haunted by a "nameless horror" so "mystical and well nigh ineffable" that he could hardly express; it was "the whiteness of the whale that above all things appalled me".

At the end of the novel, Moby Dick destroys the Pequod. Ahab and the crew were drowned, with the exception of Ishmael. The novel does not say whether Moby Dick survives or not.

== Real-life models ==
Although attacks by whales on whalers were not at all common, there were instances, of which Melville was aware.

One was the sinking of the Nantucket whaler Essex in 1820, after a large sperm whale rammed her 2,000 miles (3,200 km) from the western coast of South America. First mate Owen Chase, one of eight survivors, recorded the events in his 1821 Narrative of the Most Extraordinary and Distressing Shipwreck of the Whale-Ship Essex.

The other event was the alleged killing in the late 1830s of the albino sperm whale Mocha Dick, in the waters off the Chilean island of Mocha. Mocha Dick was rumored to have nineteen harpoons in his back from other whalers, and appeared to attack ships with premeditated ferocity. One of his battles with a whaler served as the subject for an article by explorer Jeremiah N. Reynolds in the May 1839 issue of The Knickerbocker or New-York Monthly Magazine. Melville was familiar with the article, which described:

This renowned monster, who had come off victorious in a hundred fights with his pursuers, was an old bull whale, of prodigious size and strength. From the effect of age, or more probably from a freak of nature ... a singular consequence had resulted – he was white as wool!

Mocha Dick had over 100 encounters with whalers in the decades between 1810 and the 1830s. He was described as being gigantic and covered in barnacles. Although he was the most famous, Mocha Dick was not the only white whale in the sea nor the only whale to attack hunters. While an accidental collision with a sperm whale at night accounted for sinking of the Union in 1807, it was not until August 1851 that the whaler Ann Alexander, while hunting in the Pacific off the Galapagos Islands, became the second vessel since Essex to be attacked, holed and sunk by a whale. Melville remarked:

Ye Gods! What a commentator is this Ann Alexander whale. What he has to say is short & pithy & very much to the point. I wonder if my evil art has raised this monster.

== Symbolism ==
Melville presents Moby Dick as a symbol of many things, among them God, nature, fate, evil, the ocean, and the very universe itself. Yet the symbolism of the White Whale is deliberately enigmatic, and its inscrutability is a deliberate challenge to the reader. Ishmael describes the whale's forehead as having wrinkles and scars on it that look like hieroglyphics. He muses on the difficulty of understanding what he saw:

If then, Sir William Jones, who read in thirty languages, could not read the simplest peasant's face in its profounder and more subtle meanings, how may unlettered Ishmael hope to read the awful Chaldee of the Sperm Whale's brow? I but put that brow before you. Read it if you can.

== See also ==
- List of individual cetaceans
- Devil Whale
