= Cetology of Moby-Dick =

Zoological classification of whales in the novel Moby-Dick

The cetology in Herman Melville's 1851 novel, Moby-Dick, is a running theme that appears most importantly in Ishmael's zoological classification of whales, in Chapter 32, "Cetology". The purpose of that chapter, the narrator says, is "to attend to a matter almost indispensable to a thorough appreciative understanding of the more special leviathanic revelations and allusions of all sorts which are to follow." Further descriptions of whales and their anatomy occur in seventeen other chapters, including "The Sperm Whale's Head -- Contrasted View" (Chapter 74) and "The Right Whale's Head -- Contrasted View" (Chapter 75).

Although writing a work of fiction, Melville included extensive material that presents the properties of whales in a seemingly scientific form. Many of the observations are taken from Melville's reading in whaling sources in addition to his own experiences in whaling in the 1840s. They include descriptions of a range of species in the infraorder of Cetacea. The detailed descriptions are a digression from the story-line, but critics argue that their objectivity and encyclopedic form balance the spiritual elements of the novel and ground its cosmic speculations. Although Melville "keenly parodies nonsense statistics, rigid hierarchies, and the arbitrarily definitive taxonomies characteristic of antebellum natural science", Melville also "showed the elasticity of cataloguing: how it could be used as a literary device, stylistic trait, and even function as an argument . . . the list is offered as vehicle of thought and argumentation, and for its ability to plainly display information in a systematic and exhaustive manner". These chapters, however, are the most likely to be omitted in abridged versions.

== Description ==
Ishmael's observations are not a complete scientific study, even by standards of the day. The cetological chapters do add variety and give readers information that helps them understand the story, but Melville also has thematic and aesthetic purposes. Critics justify and even praise the sections for keeping the metaphysical and spiritual meanings in the novel anchored to matter-of-fact reality and balance the extraordinary with the ordinary. The extensive descriptions show that the starting point for the “cosmic and spiritual is earthly and physical” and give the novel what one critic calls the “illusion of objectivity and the effect of a wide view of life.”

Ishmael asserts in the novel that the whale is a "spouting fish with a horizontal tail". (Whales were known to be mammals by this time, a consideration that Ishmael discusses and dismisses as irrelevant.) He attempts a taxonomy of whales largely based on size, based on his assertion that other characteristics, such as the existence of a hump or baleen, make the classification too confusing. Borrowing an analogy from publishing and bookbinding, he divides whales into three "books", called the Folio Whale (largest), Octavo Whale and the Duodecimo Whale (smaller), represented respectively by the sperm whale, the orca (which he calls the grampus) and the porpoise. Each such book is then divided into "chapters" representing a separate species.

By the current taxonomy of Cetacea, the classification in Moby-Dick is inaccurate and incomplete as well, presenting only a fraction of the nearly ninety species of Cetaceans known today. In the case of some species, in particular the blue whale (which Ishmael calls the "sulphur-bottom whale"), very little was known at the time. The classification is thus heavily weighted toward whales hunted for oil and other uses, and presents a picture of the common knowledge of whales at the time of the novel. Since Melville presents the study within a fictional context, voiced by a fictional character in the narrative, it is arguable whether or not Melville intended the classification as a serious scientific contribution. One view is that Melville "roundly ridicules his own attempts at a scientific account of the whale" and "ridicules those who attempt to understand reality with the measuring." Near the end of the chapter, Ishmael, alluding to Shakespeare's tomorrow and tomorrow and tomorrow speech, characterizes a list of omitted whale names as "mere sounds, full of Leviathanism, but signifying nothing."

== Ishmael's classification ==
The following is the classification introduced by Ishmael in Chapter XXXII, with the spellings and alternative names mentioned by Melville. He does not introduce the Latin scientific names, however, which are provided here as a cross-reference to the modern taxonomy. The Roman numerals shown here are those used by Ishmael for each "book" and "chapter".

=== I. The Folio Whale ===
These are the whales of the largest size.

- I. Sperm whale (Physeter macrocephalus), the most important prey of Nantucket whaling fleet, which operated principally in the Pacific Ocean and Indian Ocean. The notorious fictional white whale Moby Dick in the novel is of this species, and is based on the real-life sperm whale Mocha Dick in the South Pacific in the 1840s. For dramatic effect, Melville asserts inaccurately that the sperm whale is the largest creature on Earth. While the blue whale, the true largest whale, was not well-observed at that time, the fin-back whale, the second-largest whale species, was known to whalers and occasionally hunted. The sperm whale is the third-largest whale species.
- II. Right whale (several species of the genus Eubalaena of the family Balaenidae), also known simply as the Whale, the Greenland Whale, the Black Whale, the Great Whale. Melville claims this whale was the first to be regularly hunted by human beings and is famously known for providing baleen, which was also known as "whalebone" at the time. The oil of this whale was commercially known as "whale oil" and was of inferior grade to that of the sperm whale. During the middle 19th century, it was the principal prey of the whaling fleets of the United Kingdom and the Netherlands, which operated largely in the North Atlantic and Arctic Ocean.
- III. Fin-back whale (Balaenoptera physalus), also called the Tall-Spout and Long-John. According to Melville, the whale had been seen in almost every part of the oceans and was commonly observed by passengers crossing the Atlantic Ocean between Europe and New York City.
- IV. Hump-back whale (Megaptera novaeangliae). Melville states that this species is seen frequently on the northern coast of the United States, where it is frequently captured and towed back to harbor. He compares the distinctive hump on its back to the pack of a peddler. Its oil is not very valuable. "He is the most gamesome of species and light-hearted of all the whales, making more gay foam and white water generally than any other of them".
- V. Razor-back whale (probably Balaenoptera physalus, identical to the fin-back). The name "Razorback whale" is now used as a synonym for the finback. Melville includes the razorback as a separate "chapter", but states (in the voice of Ishmael) that he has only observed him at a distance off Cape Horn. He knows little about this species, "nor does anyone else".
- VI. Sulphur-bottom whale (Balaenoptera musculus, commonly known today as the blue whale). This species was elusive in Melville's day and he states he has observed it only from a distance in the southern seas. Knowledge of the whale among the Nantucket whaling fleet is sparse. He thus provides an incomplete description, mentioning the prominent feature of its "brimstone belly". According to Melville, the whale is never chased, since "he would run away with rope-walks of line".

=== II. The Octavo Whale ===
These are the whales of middle size.

- I. Grampus (Orcinus orca, commonly known as the orca or killer whale). Melville states that this species is known for its loud blowing and is well known among whalemen. According to Melville, it swims in herds and is never regularly hunted, although it has considerable oil that is good for producing light. He states that the appearance of the grampus is often taken by whalemen to presage the appearance of the sperm whale. Melville writes that "he is of moderate octavo size, varying from fifteen to twenty-five feet in length", which is much larger than the eight to thirteen feet of Risso's dolphin, also called a grampus.
- II. Black Fish whale (one or both species of the genus Globicephala, known today as the pilot whale). Melville calls him the Hyena whale, based on its appearance, stating "the inner angles of his lips are curved upwards, he carries an everlasting Mephistophelian grin on his face". He states that the whale is found in all latitudes, and has a peculiar fin which appears similar to a Roman nose. The whale is often hunted by Nantucket whalers when sperm whales are not available, primarily to keep up the ship's own supply of oil. Although it has thin blubber, a single whale can yield up to thirty gallons of oil.
- III. Narwhal or Nostril whale (Monodon monoceros). Melville writes at length about this whale, which at the time was a well-known denizen of the polar seas. He describes the horn of the narwhal and speculates on its purpose. According to Melville, it is also known as the tusked whale, horned whale and the unicorn whale. In ancient days the horn was used as an antidote for poison. He recounts that Martin Frobisher presented a narwhal horn to Elizabeth I upon returning from the Canadian Arctic. The oil of the narwhal is "very superior, clear and fine; but there is little of it, and he is seldom hunted".
- IV. Killer whale (probably the orca). Melville states that the whale is little known both by the Nantucket whaling community and by naturalists. Ishmael claims to have seen him from a distance, stating that it is approximately the size of the grampus. It is known to seize the large whales by the lip, hanging there "like a leech, till the mighty brute is worried to death". It is never hunted and the type of oil it contains is unknown to the narrator. Ishmael somewhat dislikes the name, stating that "we are all killers, on land and on sea; Bonapartes and sharks included".
- V. Thrasher whale (probably the orca, mistaken as a separate species in the North Atlantic). Melville states that little is known of the whale, but it has been observed to mount the Folio whale's back as it swims, working its way upwards by flogging the larger whale with its tail.

=== III. The Duodecimo Whale ===
These are the species of the smallest size, which Melville generically calls porpoises.

- I. Huzza porpoise (Common dolphin, Delphinus delphis.). The identification arises from Melville's statement that this is the "common porpoise found all over the globe". Melville's name is completely invented here, based on the fact that "he always swims in hilarious shoals... their appearance is generally hailed with delight by the mariner... They are accounted a lucky omen". He states that a well-fed specimen will yield one gallon of good oil, but that the "fine and delicate fluid extracted from his jaws is exceedingly valuable" and is used by jewelers and watchmakers. The meat from this porpoise is also said to be "good eating".
- II. Algerine porpoise. Melville states that this species is found only in the Pacific Ocean and is slightly larger than the "Huzza porpoise". Ishmael states that the species is ferocious when attacked, and that although he has lowered for this species many times, he has yet to see this species captured. It is unclear what species Melville meant here. Possibly a pygmy killer whale or the false killer whale.
- III. Mealy-mouthed porpoise (Lissodelphis peronii, the southern right whale dolphin). Melville also calls this the right-whale porpoise, since it is often found in the vicinity of the right whale. According to Melville, it is found only in the Pacific Ocean.

== Beyond the Duodecimo ==
Ishmael also lists "a rabble of uncertain, fugitive half-fabulous whales" of which he knew only by name and not experience. These were the Bottlenose Whale, Junk Whale, Pudding-Headed Whale, Cape Whale, Leading Whale, Cannon Whale, Scragg Whale, Coppered Whale, Elephant Whale, Iceberg Whale, Quog Whale, and Blue Whale. Their lack of description makes it difficult to know exactly which taxonomically correct whales these names might refer to, if any. He notes that should any of them be caught and classified they could be easily incorporated into his system.
