= Hakugei =

Hakugei is Japanese for "White whale". It may refer to:

- Hakugei: Legend of the Moby Dick, a Japanese animated television series based on Herman Melville's 1851 novel Moby-Dick
- Hakugei (roller coaster), a roller coaster in Nagashima Spa Land
- JS Hakugei, a Taigei-class attack submarine
