= Mocha Island =

Island in Chile

Native name: Isla Mocha
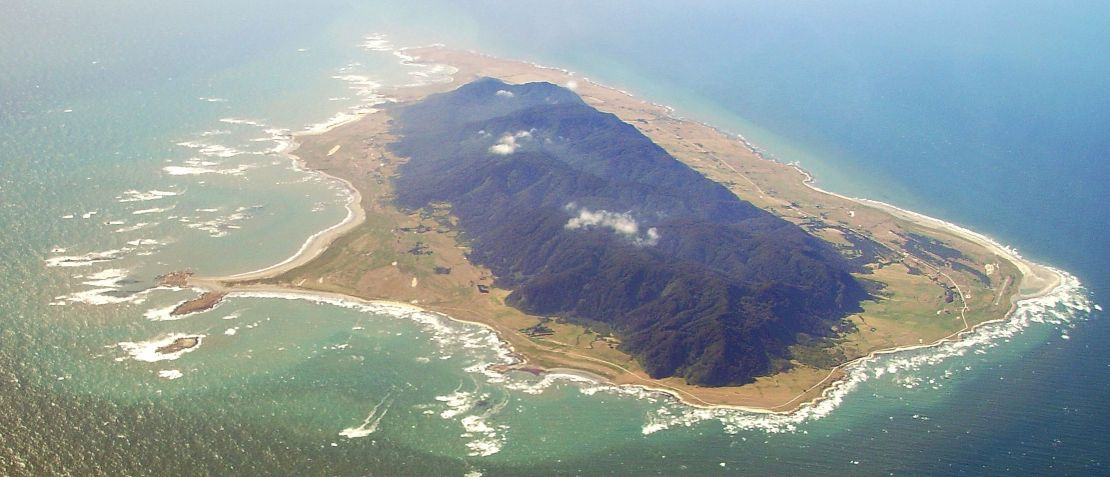
- Aerial view of Mocha Island

- Location within Chile

Geography
- Location: South-central Chile
- Coordinates: 38°21′54″S 73°54′54″W
- Area: 48 km^{2} (19 sq mi)
- Highest elevation: 300 m (1000 ft)

Administration
- Chile
- Region: Bío Bío
- Province: Arauco
- Comuna: Lebu

Demographics
- Population: ~800
- Ethnic groups: Chileans, Mapuches

Mocha Island (Spanish: Isla Mocha [ˈisla ˈmotʃa]) is a Chilean island located west of the coast of Arauco Province in the Pacific Ocean. The island is the location of numerous historic shipwrecks. In Mapuche mythology, the souls of dead people travel west to visit this island. The waters off the island are a popular place for recreational sea fishing.

== History ==
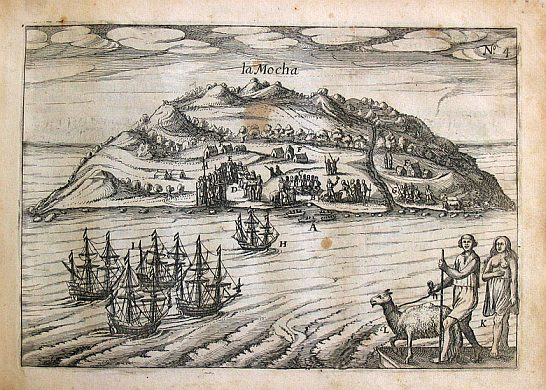
Depiction of Isla Mocha during an incursion by a Dutch pirate fleet in 1616. From the book that narrates the adventures of Dutch pirate Joris van Spilbergen.

The island was historically inhabited by an indigenous coastal population of Mapuches known as the Lafkenches. The first European to document Mocha was Juan Bautista Pastene on September 10, 1544, who named it Isla de San Nicolas de Tolentino.

According to Juan Ignacio Molina, the Dutch captain Joris van Spilbergen observed the use of chilihueques (a South American camelid) by native Mapuches of Mocha Island as plough animals in 1614.

Mocha Island was regularly visited by pirates and privateers from the Netherlands and England. Francis Drake and Olivier van Noort are known to have used the island as a supply base. When Drake was visiting it during his circumnavigation of the globe he was seriously hurt by its Mapuche inhabitants. Richard Hawkins, Drake's cousin, also passed with his ship the Dainty. In 1685, the Mapuche were transported by Governor José de Garro to a reducción on the plain on the right bank of the Bio Bio River called the Valley of Mocha that later became the location of the modern city of Concepción, Chile.

The waters off the island were inhabited by sperm whale, including Mocha Dick, who was depicted by American explorer and author Jeremiah N. Reynolds in his published account, "Mocha Dick: Or The White Whale of the Pacific: A Leaf from a Manuscript Journal" in May, 1839 in The Knickerbocker magazine in New York. Mocha Dick was one of the inspirations for the fictional whale Moby Dick in the 1851 novel Moby-Dick by Herman Melville.

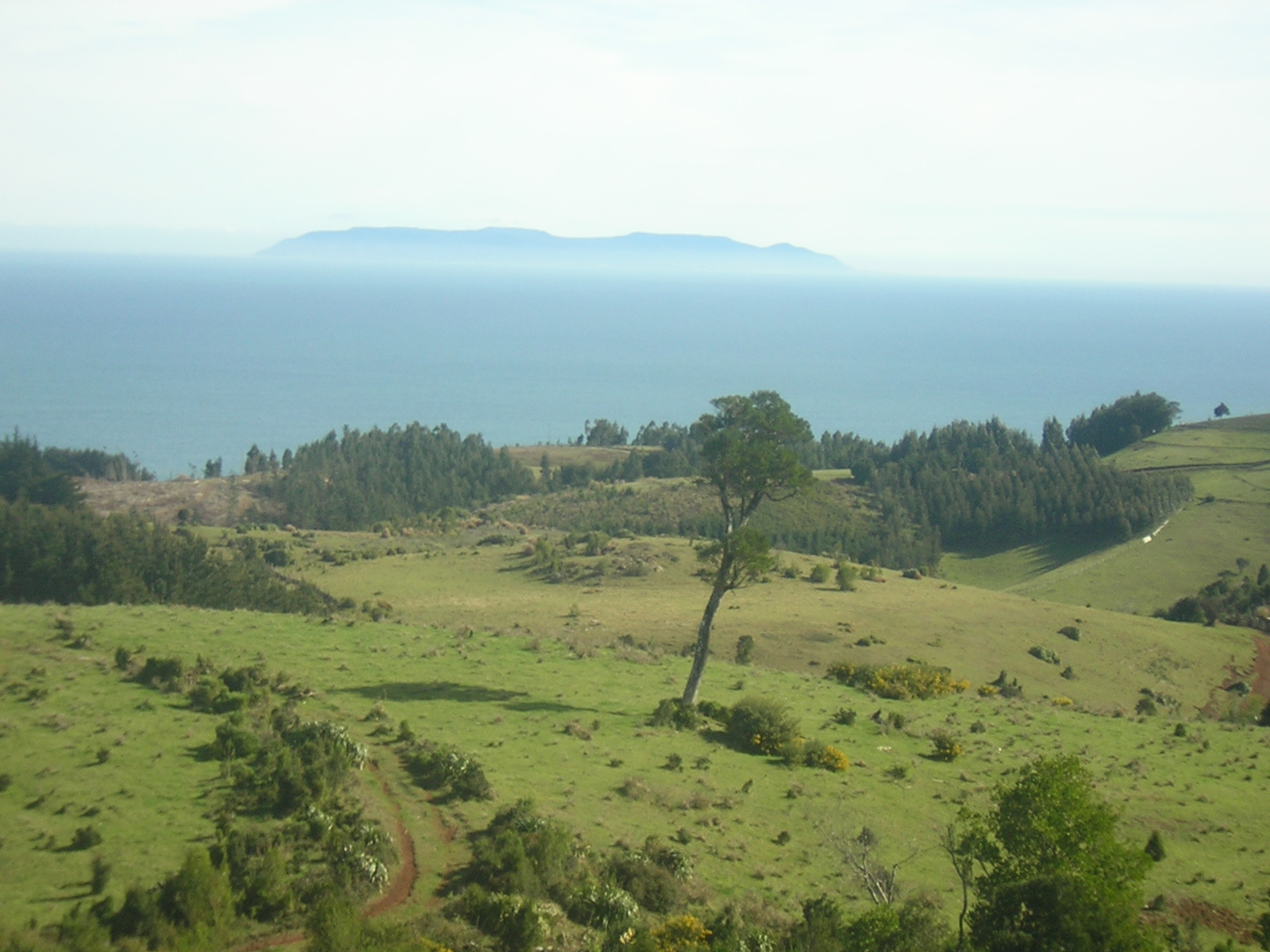
Carahue coastal area with Mocha Island in the distance

=== Polynesian contact ===
In December 2007 several human skulls with Polynesian features, such as a pentagonal shape when viewed from behind, were found lying on a shelf in a museum in Concepción. These skulls originated from Mocha Island.

== Geography ==
The island is approximately 48 km^{2} (19 sq mi) in area, with a chain of mountains running north–south.

=== Geology ===
Geologically, the island is made of sedimentary rock stratum of Ranquil Formation, a formation whose main outcrops lie in the continent. The island was permanently uplifted as result of the 2010 Chile earthquake but this uplift was less than in the adjacent coast where Tirúa had the largest uplift of all the coast. The existence of a splay fault called Tirúa-Mocha Fault may explain the different behaviour of Mocha Island relative to the mainland during this earthquake.

=== Environment ===
Mocha Island National Reserve covers approximately 45% of the island's surface. The Pacific degu (Octodon pacificus), also known as the Mocha Island degu, a species of rodent in the family Octodontidae, is endemic to Mocha Island. The island has been designated an Important Bird Area (IBA) by BirdLife International because it supports significant populations of pink-footed shearwaters, Peruvian pelicans, red-legged cormorants and elegant terns.

=== Climate ===
Climate data for Mocha Island
Month	Jan	Feb	Mar	Apr	May	Jun	Jul	Aug	Sep	Oct	Nov	Dec	Year
Mean daily maximum °C (°F)	18.2 (64.8)	18.1 (64.6)	17.1 (62.8)	15.7 (60.3)	14.7 (58.5)	13.3 (55.9)	12.9 (55.2)	12.9 (55.2)	13.2 (55.8)	13.9 (57.0)	15.5 (59.9)	17.5 (63.5)	15.3 (59.5)
Daily mean °C (°F)	15.5 (59.9)	15.1 (59.2)	14.6 (58.3)	13.4 (56.1)	12.0 (53.6)	10.7 (51.3)	10.4 (50.7)	10.1 (50.2)	10.3 (50.5)	11.6 (52.9)	12.9 (55.2)	14.6 (58.3)	12.6 (54.7)
Mean daily minimum °C (°F)	12.2 (54.0)	12.0 (53.6)	11.7 (53.1)	10.4 (50.7)	9.1 (48.4)	7.7 (45.9)	7.4 (45.3)	6.9 (44.4)	7.3 (45.1)	8.5 (47.3)	9.7 (49.5)	11.2 (52.2)	9.5 (49.1)
Average precipitation mm (inches)	33.9 (1.33)	37.8 (1.49)	83.3 (3.28)	129.1 (5.08)	217.9 (8.58)	207.2 (8.16)	203.5 (8.01)	149.0 (5.87)	113.6 (4.47)	55.9 (2.20)	77.9 (3.07)	63.8 (2.51)	1,372.9 (54.05)
Average relative humidity (%)	86	87	88	89	89	89	90	89	89	87	86	85	88
Source: Bioclimatografia de Chile

== Sources ==
- Francisco Solano Asta-Buruaga y Cienfuegos, Diccionario geográfico de la República de Chile, SEGUNDA EDICIÓN CORREGIDA Y AUMENTADA, NUEVA YORK, D. APPLETON Y COMPAÑÍA. 1899. pg. 449–450 Mocha (Isla de)
