= Moby-Dick =

1851 novel by Herman Melville

Moby-Dick; or, The Whale
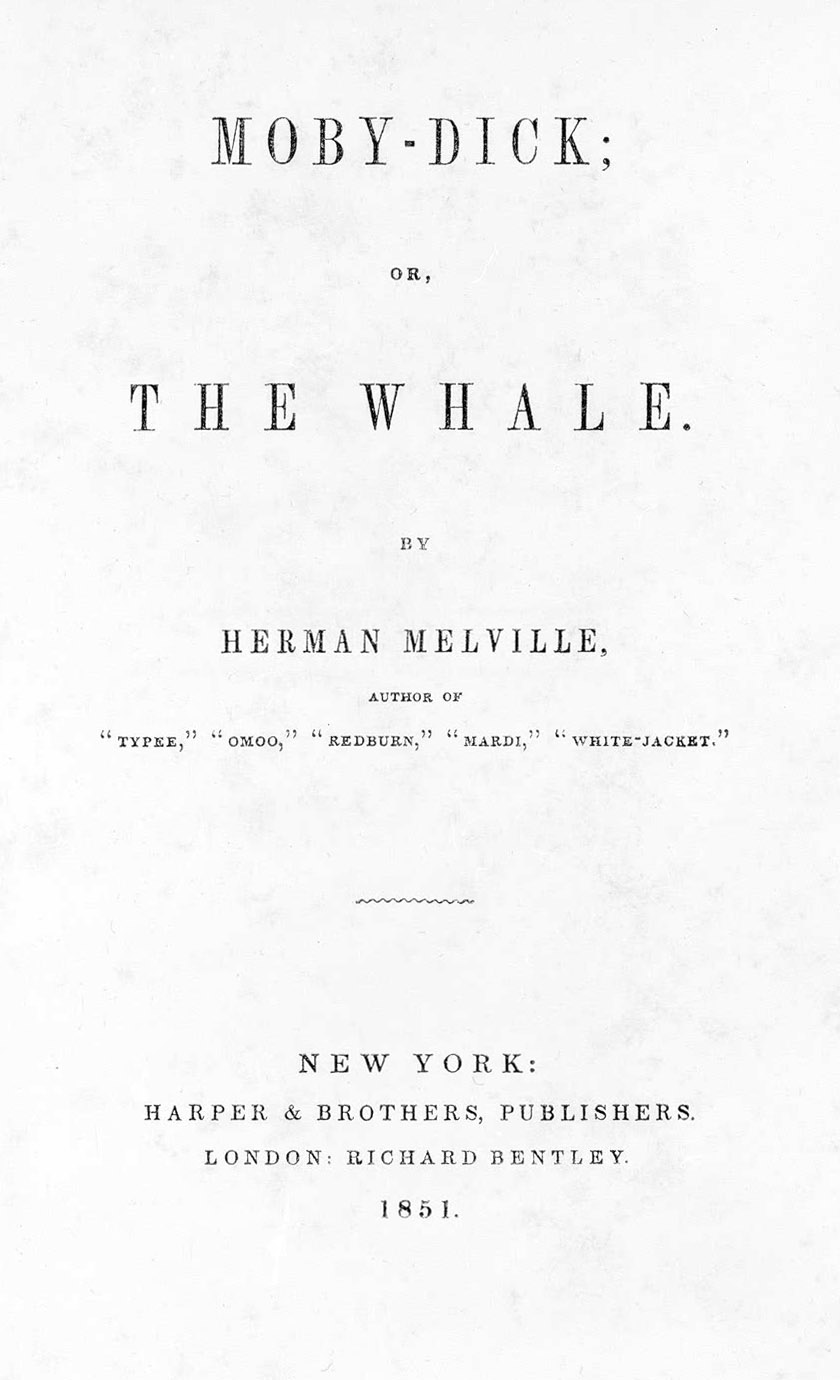
- The cover of the first American edition of Moby-Dick, published in November 1851
- Author: Herman Melville
- Language: English
- Genre: Adventure fiction; epic; sea story; encyclopedic novel
- Publisher: Richard Bentley (United Kingdom); Harper & Brothers (United States)
- Publication date: October 18, 1851 (United Kingdom); November 14, 1851 (United States)
- Publication place: United States
- Pages: 635 (U.S. edition)
- Dewey Decimal: 813.3
- LC Class: PZ3.M498 Mo3
- Text: Moby-Dick; or, The Whale at Wikisource

Moby-Dick; or, The Whale is an 1851 epic novel by American writer Herman Melville. The book centers on the sailor Ishmael's narrative of the maniacal quest of Ahab, captain of the whaling ship Pequod, for vengeance against Moby Dick, the giant white sperm whale that bit off his leg on the ship's previous voyage. A contribution to the literature of the American Renaissance, Moby-Dick was published to mixed reviews, was a commercial failure, and was out of print at the time of the author's death in 1891. Its reputation as a Great American Novel was established only in the 20th century, after the 1919 centennial of its author's birth. William Faulkner said he wished he had written the book himself, and D. H. Lawrence called it "one of the strangest and most wonderful books in the world" and "the greatest book of the sea ever written". Its opening sentence, "Call me Ishmael", is among world literature's most famous.

Melville began writing Moby-Dick in February 1850 and finished 18 months later, a year after he had anticipated. Melville drew on his experience as a common sailor from 1841 to 1844, including on whalers, and on wide reading in whaling literature. The white whale is modeled on a notoriously hard-to-catch albino whale Mocha Dick, and the book's ending is based on the sinking of the whaleship Essex in 1820. The detailed and realistic descriptions of sailing, whale hunting and of extracting whale oil, as well as life aboard ship among a culturally diverse crew, are mixed with exploration of class and social status, good and evil, and the existence of God.

The book's literary influences include Shakespeare, Thomas Carlyle, Sir Thomas Browne and the Bible. In addition to narrative prose, Melville uses styles and literary devices ranging from songs, poetry, and catalogs to Shakespearean stage directions, soliloquies, and asides. In August 1850, with the manuscript perhaps half finished, he met Nathaniel Hawthorne and was deeply impressed by his Mosses from an Old Manse, which he compared to Shakespeare in its cosmic ambitions. This encounter may have inspired him to revise and deepen Moby-Dick, which is dedicated to Hawthorne, "in token of my admiration for his genius".

The book was first published (in three volumes) as The Whale in London in October 1851, and under its definitive title, Moby-Dick; or, The Whale, in a single-volume edition in New York in November. The London publisher, Richard Bentley, censored or changed sensitive passages; Melville made revisions as well, including a last-minute change of the title for the New York edition. The whale, however, appears in the text of both editions as "Moby Dick", without the hyphen. Reviewers in Britain were largely favorable, though some objected that the tale seemed to be told by a narrator who perished with the ship, as the British edition lacked the epilogue recounting Ishmael's survival. American reviewers were more hostile.

== Plot ==
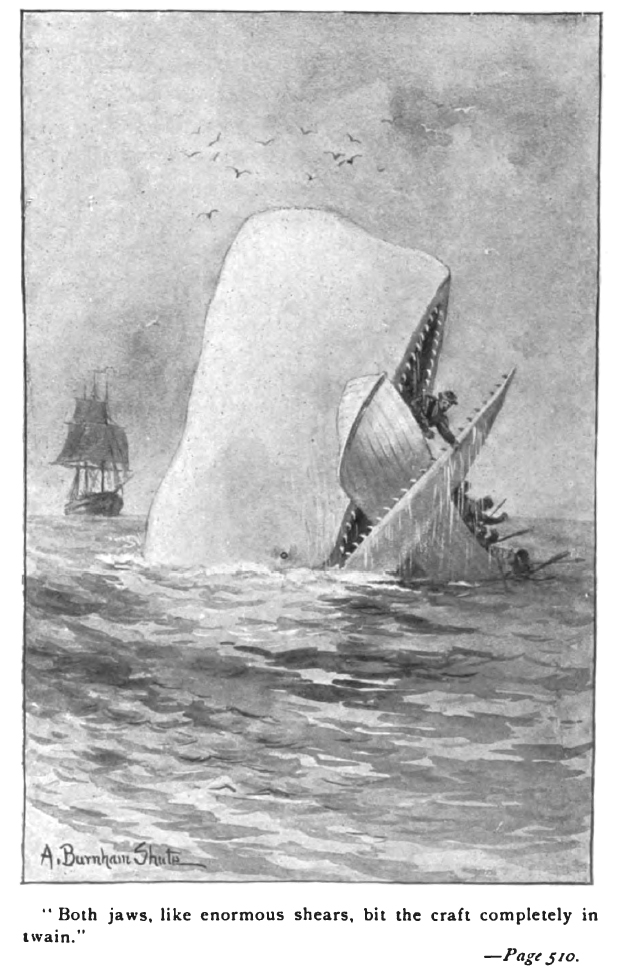
Moby Dick attacking a whaling boat

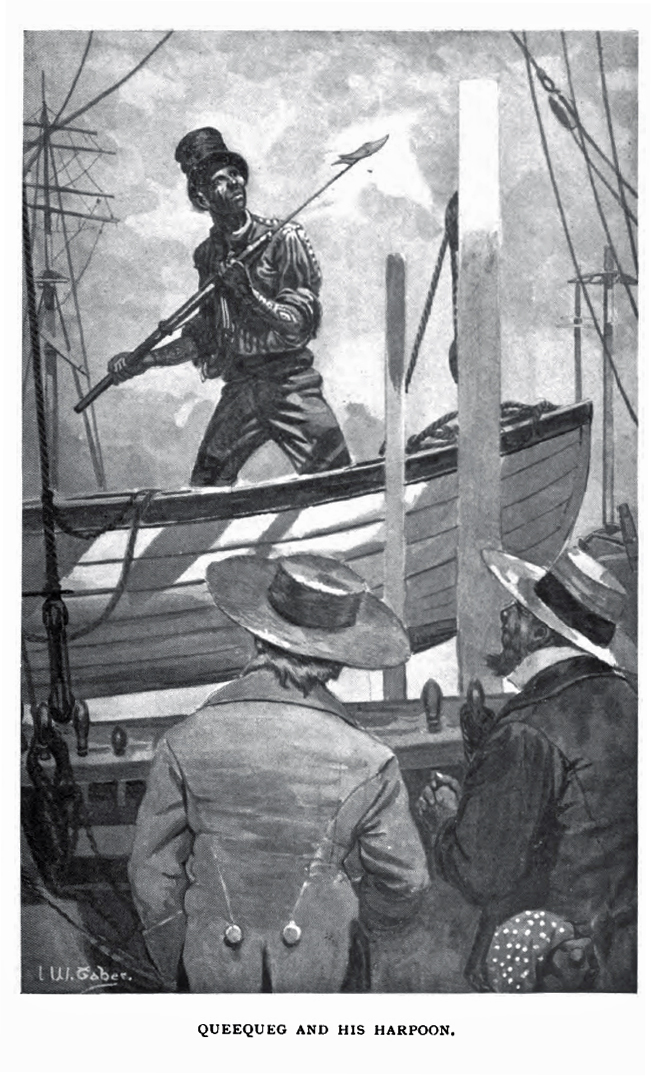
The illustration of Queequeg in a 1902 edition

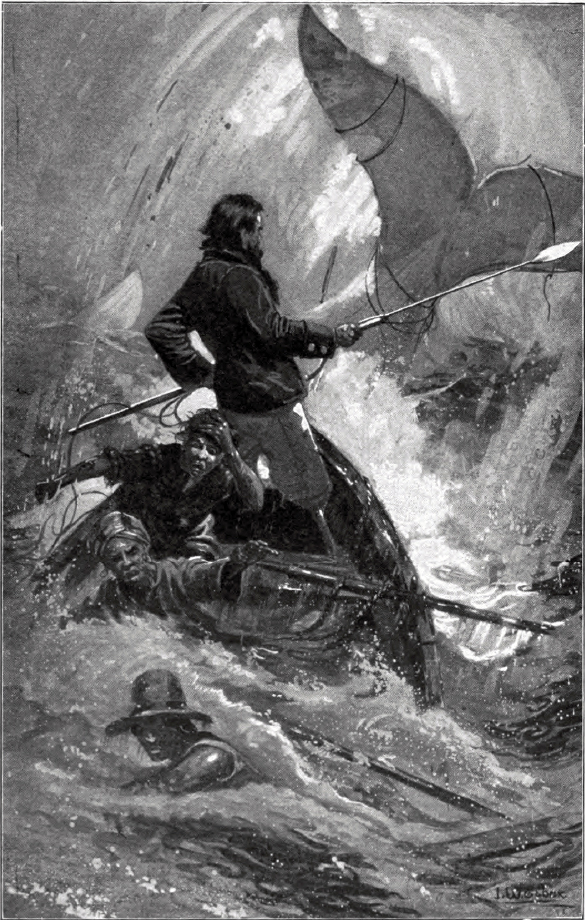
Moby Dick in a 1902 edition

Ishmael travels in December from Manhattan Island to New Bedford to join a whaling voyage as a green hand. At a crowded inn, he shares a bed with Queequeg, a tattooed Polynesian harpooneer and son of a king from the island of Rokovoko. The next morning, they attend Father Mapple's sermon on Jonah before heading to Nantucket. Ishmael signs aboard the Pequod under Quaker owners Bildad and Peleg. Peleg describes Captain Ahab as a "grand, ungodly, god-like man" who nevertheless has "his humanities". Queequeg joins the crew, and a man named Elijah prophesies a dire fate should Ishmael and Queequeg join Ahab. Shadowy figures board the ship, and on Christmas Day the Pequod departs.

Ishmael extensively discusses cetology and introduces the crew members: chief mate Starbuck, a realist Nantucket Quaker; cheerful second mate Stubb from Cape Cod; third mate Flask; and their harpooners Queequeg, the Gay Head Indian Tashtego, and the African Daggoo. Ahab finally appears on the quarterdeck, his leg replaced with a prosthesis fashioned from a whale's jawbone. He nails a doubloon to the mast as a reward for the first man to sight Moby Dick, the white whale which took his leg. Ahab's vow of vengeance captivates Ishmael, despite Starbuck's objection that the voyage is meant to be for profit.

The Pequod sails toward the Azores, then southwest along South America before crossing to the Indian Ocean via the Cape of Good Hope rather than rounding Cape Horn. En route, Tashtego sights a sperm whale, and the shadowy figures are revealed as Ahab's special crew, led by the Parsee Fedallah. The Pequod begins making "gams", a form of social meeting, with other ships. The Goney cannot answer Ahab's question about Moby Dick, and the Town-Ho reveals a concealed story of divine judgement involving the whale.

Stubb kills a sperm whale, and the cook Fleece delivers a sermon to the sharks feasting on the whale's carcass. Later, Queequeg mounts it, tied to Ishmael's belt by a monkey-rope as if they were Siamese twins. Stubb and Flask later kill a right whale whose head is fastened to a yardarm opposite the sperm whale's head. Ishmael philosophically compares the two heads: the right whale is Lockean, stoic, and the sperm whale is Kantean, platonic. Tashtego nearly drowns in the sperm whale's head while retrieving spermaceti but is rescued by Queequeg. Pip, a young black cabin-boy, twice leaps from a whale boat in terror; the second time he is abandoned at sea and is insane by the time they rescue him.

The crew processes various harvested whale parts: liquifying congealed spermaceti, boiling blubber, decanting warm oil into casks, and stowing them in cargo. Ahab interprets the doubloon's symbolism as representing his energy, firmness, and victory. In a gam with the Samuel Enderby, its captain says he lost an arm to Moby Dick yet bears no animosity. Queequeg falls ill, prompting the carpenter to make a coffin, but Queequeg recovers and uses it as a seachest. Ahab has the blacksmith forge a special harpoon tempered in the blood of his harpooners. Fedallah prophesies Ahab's death: Ahab will see two hearses (one not made by mortal hands and the other made of American wood); Fedallah will die before Ahab; and only hemp can kill Ahab.

During a typhoon, lightning strikes the mast and disorients the compass. Ahab makes a new one and orders the log be heaved, but the weathered line snaps, leaving the ship with no way to fix its location. The Rachel, commanded by a Nantucket captain, seeks survivors from one of her whaleboats which had pursued Moby Dick, including the captain's son, but Ahab refuses to join the search. In a final gam with the damaged Delight, Ahab flourishes his special harpoon and presses onward.

Ahab sights Moby Dick and claims the doubloon for himself. On the first day of the chase, the whale bites Ahab's whaleboat in two, tosses the captain into the sea and scatters his crew. On the second day, it smashes the three boats hunting it; Fedallah is killed and lashed to the whale's back, which becomes the first "hearse" of his prophecy. On the third day, Moby Dick destroys the Pequod, making it the "hearse of American wood". Ahab plants his harpoon in the whale's flank, but the line loops around his neck, dragging him to his death. Queequeg's coffin escapes the suction of the sinking Pequod. Ishmael clings to the coffin until the Rachel rescues him while still searching for her lost seamen.

== Structure ==
=== Point of view ===
Ishmael is the narrator, shaping his story with the use of many different genres including sermons, stage plays, soliloquies, and emblematical readings. Repeatedly, Ishmael refers to his writing of the book: "But how can I hope to explain myself here; and yet, in some dim, random way, explain myself? I must, else all these chapters might be naught." Scholar John Bryant calls him the novel's "central consciousness and narrative voice". Walter Bezanson first distinguishes Ishmael as narrator from Ishmael as character, whom he calls "forecastle Ishmael", the younger Ishmael of some years ago. Narrator Ishmael, then, is "merely young Ishmael grown older". A second distinction is between either or both Ishmaels with the author Herman Melville. Bezanson warns readers to "resist any one-to-one equation of Melville and Ishmael".

=== Chapter structure ===
According to critic Walter Bezanson, the chapter structure can be divided into "chapter sequences", "chapter clusters", and "balancing chapters". The simplest sequences are of narrative progression, then sequences of theme such as the three chapters on whale painting, and sequences of structural similarity, such as the five dramatic chapters beginning with "The Quarter-Deck" or the four chapters beginning with "The Candles". Chapter clusters are the chapters on the significance of the color white, and those on the meaning of fire. Balancing chapters are chapters of opposites, such as "Loomings" versus the "Epilogue", or similars, such as "The Quarter-Deck" and "The Candles".

Scholar Lawrence Buell describes the arrangement of the non-narrative chapters (Note: Chapters that are of a non-narrative, descriptive type are 32–33, 35, 42, 45, 55–57, 62–63, 68, 74–77, 79–80, 82–83, 85–86, 88–90, 92, and 101–105. Together, they constitute about one fifth of the total number of chapters.) as structured around three patterns: first, the nine meetings of the Pequod with ships that have encountered Moby Dick. Each has been more and more severely damaged, foreshadowing the Pequod's own fate. Second, the increasingly impressive encounters with whales. In the early encounters, the whaleboats hardly make contact; later there are false alarms and routine chases; finally, the massive assembling of whales at the edges of the China Sea in "The Grand Armada". A typhoon near Japan sets the stage for Ahab's confrontation with Moby Dick.

The third pattern is the cetological documentation, so lavish that it can be divided into two subpatterns. These chapters start with the ancient history of whaling and a bibliographical classification of whales, getting closer with second-hand stories of the evil of whales in general and of Moby Dick in particular, a chronologically ordered commentary on pictures of whales. The climax to this section is chapter 57, "Of whales in paint etc.", which begins with the humble (a beggar in London) and ends with the sublime (the constellation Cetus). The next chapter ("Brit"), thus the other half of this pattern, begins with the book's first description of live whales, and next the anatomy of the sperm whale is studied, more or less from front to rear and from outer to inner parts, all the way down to the skeleton. Two concluding chapters set forth the whale's evolution as a species and claim its eternal nature.

Some "ten or more" of the chapters on whale killings, beginning at two-fifths of the book, are developed enough to be called "events". As Bezanson writes, "in each case a killing provokes either a chapter sequence or a chapter cluster of cetological lore growing out of the circumstance of the particular killing," thus these killings are "structural occasions for ordering the whaling essays and sermons".

Buell observes that the "narrative architecture" is an "idiosyncratic variant of the bipolar observer/hero narrative", that is, the novel is structured around the two main characters, Ahab and Ishmael, who are intertwined and contrasted with each other, with Ishmael the observer and narrator. As the story of Ishmael, remarks Robert Milder, it is a "narrative of education".

Bryant and Springer find that the book is structured around the two consciousnesses of Ahab and Ishmael, with Ahab as a force of linearity and Ishmael a force of digression. While both have an angry sense of being orphaned, they try to come to terms with this hole in their beings in different ways: Ahab with violence, Ishmael with meditation. And while the plot in Moby-Dick may be driven by Ahab's anger, Ishmael's desire to get a hold of the "ungraspable" accounts for the novel's lyricism. Buell sees a double quest in the book: Ahab's is to hunt Moby Dick, Ishmael's is "to understand what to make of both whale and hunt".

One of the most distinctive features of the book is the variety of genres. Bezanson mentions sermons, dreams, travel account, autobiography, Elizabethan plays, and epic poetry. He calls Ishmael's explanatory footnotes to establish the documentary genre "a Nabokovian touch".

=== Nine meetings with other ships ===
A significant structural device is the series of nine meetings between the Pequod and other ships. These meetings are important in three ways. First, their placement in the narrative: the initial two meetings and the last two are both close to each other. The central group of five gams are separated by about 12 chapters. This pattern provides a structural element, remarks Bezanson, as if the encounters were "bones to the book's flesh". Second, Ahab's developing responses to the meetings plot the "rising curve of his passion" and of his monomania. Third, in contrast to Ahab, Ishmael interprets the significance of each ship individually: "each ship is a scroll which the narrator unrolls and reads".

Bezanson sees no single way to account for the meaning of all of these ships. Instead, they may be interpreted as "a group of metaphysical parables, a series of biblical analogues, a masque of the situation confronting man, a pageant of the humors within men, a parade of the nations, and so forth, as well as concrete and symbolic ways of thinking about the White Whale".

Scholar Nathalia Wright sees the meetings and the significance of the vessels along other lines. She singles out the four vessels which have already encountered Moby Dick. The first, the Jeroboam, is named after the predecessor of the biblical King Ahab. Her "prophetic" fate is "a message of warning to all who follow, articulated by Gabriel and vindicated by the Samuel Enderby, the Rachel, the Delight, and at last the Pequod". None of the other ships has been completely destroyed because none of their captains shared Ahab's monomania; the fate of the Jeroboam reinforces the structural parallel between Ahab and his biblical namesake: "Ahab did more to provoke the Lord God of Israel to anger than all the kings of Israel that were before him" (I Kings 16:33).

== Themes ==
An early enthusiast for the Melville Revival, the English author E. M. Forster remarked in 1927: "Moby-Dick is full of meanings: its meaning is a different problem." Yet he saw as "the essential" in the book "its prophetic song", which flows "like an undercurrent" beneath the surface action and morality. The hunt for the whale can be seen as a metaphor for an epistemological quest—in the words of biographer Laurie Robertson-Lorant, "man's search for meaning in a world of deceptive appearances and fatal delusions". Ishmael's taxonomy of whales merely demonstrates "the limitations of scientific knowledge and the impossibility of achieving certainty". She also contrasts Ishmael's and Ahab's attitudes toward life, with Ishmael's open-minded and meditative, "polypositional stance" as antithetical to Ahab's monomania, adhering to dogmatic rigidity.

Melville biographer Andrew Delbanco cites race as an example of this search for truth beneath surface differences, noting that all races are represented among the crew members of the Pequod. Although Ishmael initially is afraid of Queequeg as a tattooed possible cannibal, he soon decides that he would "Better sleep with a sober cannibal than a drunken Christian." While it may be rare for a mid-19th century American book to feature Black characters in a nonslavery context, slavery is frequently mentioned. The theme of race is carried primarily by Pip, the diminutive Black cabin boy. When Pip has almost drowned, and Ahab, genuinely touched by Pip's suffering, questions him gently, Pip "can only parrot the language of an advertisement for the return of a fugitive slave: 'Pip! Reward for Pip!'".

Editors Bryant and Springer suggest that perception is a central theme—the difficulty of seeing and understanding, which makes deep reality hard to discover and truth hard to pin down. Ahab explains that, like all things, the evil whale wears a disguise: "All visible objects, man, are but pasteboard masks"—and Ahab is determined to "strike through the mask! How can the prisoner reach outside, except by thrusting through the wall? To me, the white whale is that wall" (Ch. 36, "The Quarter-Deck"). This theme pervades the novel, perhaps never so emphatically as in "The Doubloon" (Ch. 99), where each crewmember perceives the coin in a way shaped by his own personality. Later, the American edition has Ahab "discover no sign" (Ch. 133) of the whale when he is staring into the deep. In fact, Moby Dick is then swimming up at him. In the British edition, Melville changed the word "discover" to "perceive", and with good reason, for "discovery" means finding what is already there, but "perceiving", or better still, perception, is "a matter of shaping what exists by the way in which we see it". The point is not that Ahab would discover the whale as an object, but that he would perceive it as a symbol of his making.

Yet Melville does not offer easy solutions. Ishmael and Queequeg's sensual friendship initiates a kind of racial harmony that is shattered when the crew's dancing erupts into racial conflict in "Midnight, Forecastle" (Ch. 40). Fifty chapters later, Pip suffers mental disintegration after he is reminded that as a slave he would be worth less money than a whale. Commodified and brutalized, "Pip becomes the ship's conscience". His views of property are another example of wrestling with moral choice. In Chapter 89, "Fast-Fish and Loose-Fish", Ishmael expounds the legal concept "fast-fish and loose-fish", which gives right of ownership to those who take possession of an abandoned fish or ship; he compares the concept to various forms of domination, such as slavery, serfdom, tithes and military conquest.

The novel has also been read as critical of the contemporary literary and philosophical movement Transcendentalism, attacking the thought of leading Transcendentalist Ralph Waldo Emerson in particular. The life and death of Ahab has been read as an attack on Emerson's philosophy of self-reliance, for one, in its destructive potential and possible justification for egoism. Richard Chase writes that for Melville, "Death—spiritual, emotional, physical—is the price of self-reliance when it is pushed to the point of solipsism, where the world has no existence apart from the all-sufficient self." In that regard, Chase sees Melville's art as antithetical to that of Emerson's thought, in that Melville "[points] up the dangers of an exaggerated self-regard, rather than, as ... Emerson loved to do, [suggested] the vital possibilities of the self". Newton Arvin further suggests that self-reliance was, for Melville, really the "[masquerade in kingly weeds of] a wild egoism, anarchic, irresponsible, and destructive".

== Style ==
"Above all", say the scholars Bryant and Springer, Moby-Dick is language: "nautical, biblical, Homeric, Shakespearean, Miltonic, cetological, alliterative, fanciful, colloquial, archaic and unceasingly allusive". Melville stretches grammar, quotes well-known or obscure sources, or swings from calm prose to high rhetoric, technical exposition, seaman's slang, mystic speculation, or wild prophetic archaism. Melville coined words, critic Newton Arvin recognizes, as if the English vocabulary were too limited for the complex things he had to express. Perhaps the most striking example is the use of verbal nouns, mostly plural, such as allurings, coincidings, and leewardings. Equally abundant are unfamiliar adjectives and adverbs, including participial adjectives such as officered, omnitooled, and uncatastrophied; participial adverbs such as intermixingly, postponedly, and uninterpenetratingly; rarities such as the adjectives unsmoothable, spermy, and leviathanic, and adverbs such as sultanically, Spanishly, and Venetianly; and adjectival compounds ranging from odd to magnificent, such as "the message-carrying air", "the circus-running sun", and "teeth-tiered sharks". It is rarer for Melville to create his own verbs from nouns, but he does this with what Arvin calls "irresistible effect", such as in "who didst thunder him higher than a throne", and "my fingers ... began ... to serpentine and spiralize". For Arvin, the essence of the writing style of Moby-Dick lies in

the manner in which the parts of speech are 'intermixingly' assorted in Melville's style—so that the distinction between verbs and nouns, substantives and modifiers, becomes a half unreal one—this is the prime characteristic of his language. No feature of it could express more tellingly the awareness that lies below and behind Moby-Dick—the awareness that action and condition, movement and stasis, object and idea, are but surface aspects of one underlying reality.

Later critics have expanded Arvin's categories. The superabundant vocabulary can be broken down into strategies used individually and in combination. First, the original modification of words as "Leviathanism" and the exaggerated repetition of modified words, as in the series "pitiable", "pity", "pitied" and "piteous" (Ch. 81, "The Pequod Meets the Virgin"). Second, the use of existing words in new ways, as when the whale "heaps" and "tasks". Third, words lifted from specialized fields, as "fossiliferous". Fourth, the use of unusual adjective-noun combinations, as in "concentrating brow" and "immaculate manliness" (Ch. 26, "Knights and Squires"). Fifth, using the participial modifier to emphasize and to reinforce the already established expectations of the reader, as the words "preluding" and "foreshadowing" ("so still and subdued and yet somehow preluding was all the scene ..."; "In this foreshadowing interval ...").

Other characteristic stylistic elements are the echoes and overtones, both imitation of distinct styles and habitual use of sources to shape his own work. His three most important sources, in order, are the Bible, Shakespeare, and Milton.

The novel uses several levels of rhetoric. The simplest is "a relatively straightforward expository style", such as in the cetological chapters, though they are "rarely sustained, and serve chiefly as transitions" between more sophisticated levels. A second level is the "poetic", such as in Ahab's quarterdeck monologue, to the point that it can be set as blank verse. Set over a metrical pattern, the rhythms are "evenly controlled—too evenly perhaps for prose", Bezanson suggests. A third level is the idiomatic, and just as the poetic it hardly is present in pure form. Examples of this are "the consistently excellent idiom" of Stubb, such as in the way he encourages the rowing crew in a rhythm of speech that suggests "the beat of the oars takes the place of the metronomic meter". The fourth and final level of rhetoric is the composite, "a magnificent blending" of the first three and possible other elements:

The Nantucketer, he alone resides and riots on the sea; he alone, in Bible language, goes down to it in ships; to and fro ploughing it as his own special plantation. There is his home; there lies his business, which a Noah's flood would not interrupt, though it overwhelmed all the millions in China. He lives on the sea, as prairie cocks in the prairie; he hides among the waves, he climbs them as chamois hunters climb the Alps. For years he knows not the land; so that when he comes to it at last, it smells like another world, more strangely than the moon would to an Earthsman. With the landless gull, that at sunset folds her wings and is rocked to sleep between billows; so at nightfall, the Nantucketer, out of sight of land, furls his sails, and lays him to his rest, while under his very pillow rush herds of walruses and whales.
("Nantucket", Ch. 14).

Bezanson calls this chapter a comical "prose poem" that blends "high and low with a relaxed assurance". Similar passages include the "marvelous hymn to spiritual democracy" in the middle of "Knights and Squires".

The elaborate use of the Homeric simile may not have been learned from Homer himself, yet Matthiessen finds the writing "more consistently alive" on the Homeric than on the Shakespearean level, especially during the final chase the "controlled accumulation" of such similes emphasizes Ahab's hubris through a succession of land-images, for instance: "The ship tore on; leaving such a furrow in the sea as when a cannon-ball, missent, becomes a ploughshare and turns up the level field" ("The Chase – Second Day", Ch. 134). A paragraph-long simile describes how the 30 men of the crew became a single unit:

For as the one ship that held them all; though it was put together of all contrasting things—oak, and maple, and pine wood; iron, and pitch, and hemp—yet all these ran into each other in the one concrete hull, which shot on its way, both balanced and directed by the long central keel; even so, all the individualities of the crew, this man's valor, that man's fear; guilt and guiltiness, all varieties were welded into oneness, and were all directed to that fatal goal which Ahab their one lord and keel did point to.
("The Chase – Second Day", Ch. 134).

The final phrase fuses the two halves of the comparison; the men become identical with the ship, which follows Ahab's direction. The concentration only gives way to more imagery: the "mastheads, like the tops of tall palms, were outspreadingly tufted with arms and legs". All these images contribute their "startling energy" to the advance of the narrative. When the boats are lowered, the imagery serves to dwarf everything but Ahab's will in the presence of Moby Dick. These similes, with their astonishing "imaginative abundance," not only create dramatic movement, Matthiessen observes: "They are no less notable for breadth; and the more sustained among them, for an heroic dignity."

=== Assimilation of Shakespeare ===
F. O. Matthiessen, in 1941, declared that Melville's "possession by Shakespeare went far beyond all other influences" in that it made Melville discover his own full strength "through the challenge of the most abundant imagination in history". This insight was then reinforced by the study of Melville's annotations in his reading copy of Shakespeare, which show that he immersed himself in Shakespeare when he was preparing for Moby-Dick, especially King Lear and Macbeth. Reading Shakespeare, Matthiessen observes, was "a catalytic agent", one that transformed his writing "from limited reporting to the expression of profound natural forces".

The creation of Ahab, Melville biographer Leon Howard discovered, followed an observation by Coleridge in his lecture on Hamlet: "one of Shakespeare's modes of creating characters is to conceive any one intellectual or moral faculty in morbid excess, and then to place himself. ... thus mutilated or diseased, under given circumstances". Coleridge's vocabulary is echoed in some phrases that describe Ahab. Ahab seemed to have "what seems a half-wilful over-ruling morbidness at the bottom of his nature", and "all men tragically great", Melville added, "are made so through a certain morbidness; "all mortal greatness is but disease". In addition to this, in Howard's view, the self-references of Ishmael as a "tragic dramatist", and his defense of his choice of a hero who lacked "all outward majestical trappings" is evidence that Melville "consciously thought of his protagonist as a tragic hero of the sort found in Hamlet and King Lear".

Matthiessen demonstrates the extent to which Melville was in full possession of his powers in the description of Ahab, which ends in language

that suggests Shakespeare's but is not an imitation of it: 'Oh, Ahab! what shall be grand in thee, it must needs be plucked from the skies and dived for in the deep, and featured in the unbodied air!' The imaginative richness of the final phrase seems particularly Shakespearean, "but its two key words appear only once each in the plays ... and to neither of these usages is Melville indebted for his fresh combination".

Melville's assimilation of Shakespeare, Matthiessen concludes, gave Moby-Dick "a kind of diction that depended upon no source", and that could, as D.H. Lawrence put it, convey something "almost superhuman or inhuman, bigger than life". The prose is not based on anybody else's verse but on "a sense of speech rhythm".

Matthiessen finds debts to Shakespeare, whether hard or easy to recognize, on almost every page. He points out that the phrase "mere sounds, full of Leviathanism, but signifying nothing" at the end of "Cetology" (Ch.32) echoes the famous phrase in Macbeth: "Told by an idiot, full of sound and fury, Signifying nothing." Matthiessen shows that Ahab's first extended speech to the crew, in the "Quarter-Deck" (Ch.36), is "virtually blank verse, and can be printed as such":

But look ye, Starbuck, what is said in heat,
That thing unsays itself. There are men
From whom warm words are small indignity.
I mean not to incense thee. Let it go.
Look! see yonder Turkish cheeks of spotted tawn—
Living, breathing pictures painted by the sun.
The pagan leopards—the unrecking and
Unworshipping things, that live; and seek and give
No reason for the torrid life they feel!

In addition to this sense of rhythm, Matthiessen shows that Melville "now mastered Shakespeare's mature secret of how to make language itself dramatic". He had learned three essential things, Matthiessen sums up:

- To rely on verbs of action, "which lend their dynamic pressure to both movement and meaning". The effective tension caused by the contrast of "thou launchest navies of full-freighted worlds" and "there's that in here that still remains indifferent" in "The Candles" (Ch. 119) makes the last clause lead to a "compulsion to strike the breast", which suggests "how thoroughly the drama has come to inhere in the words".
- The Shakespearean energy of verbal compounds was not lost on him ("full-freighted").
- Finally: Melville learned how to handle "the quickened sense of life that comes from making one part of speech act as another—for example, 'earthquake' as an adjective, or the coining of 'placeless', an adjective from a noun".

=== Thomas Carlyle ===
Critics have seen parallels between Moby-Dick and Thomas Carlyle's work, particularly Sartor Resartus (1833–34), On Heroes, Hero-Worship, & the Heroic in History (1841) and the Critical and Miscellaneous Essays, which Melville read while writing the novel. James Barbour and biographer Leon Howard write that "Carlyle's rhetoric is reflected" in much of the dialogue of Ahab and Ishmael, while Melville uses Sartor's philosophical concepts of "an emblematic universe" and a "weaver god" "almost in Carlyle's words". Alexander Welsh argues that Carlyle figured "largely in the undertaking of Moby Dick", noting that the "figure of the sheep in 'The Funeral' ... is taken directly from Carlyle", specifically the essay "Boswell's Life of Johnson" (1832) and that the "language of herring and whales, fleets and commodores" may have been borrowed from Sartor. According to Paul Giles, Sartor "furnished Melville with a prototype for his playful iconoclastic style in Moby-Dick", particularly in its narrative strategy and romantic ironic paradoxes. The "shared use of the clothing metaphor" is also inspired by Sartor.

Jonathan Arac sees in Moby-Dick "a direct appropriation" of Carlyle's "Hero". "Ahab", writes Arac, "is very much a Carlylean hero", which Carlyle's "romantic image of Cromwell helped Melville to create". Carlyle's portraits of Dante Alighieri and Shakespeare in "The Hero as Poet", the third lecture of On Heroes, "offered models that helped Melville to develop as a reader and to achieve the definition of himself as a writer that made Moby-Dick possible".

=== Renaissance humanism ===
During the composition of Moby-Dick Melville also read Renaissance humanists such as Thomas Browne, Robert Burton, and Rabelais. Hershel Parker notes that Melville adopted not only their poetic and conversational prose styles, but also their skeptical attitudes towards religion. Browne's statement "I love to lose my selfe in a mystery to pursue my reason to an ob altitudo" mirrors both in ethos and poetics Ishmael's "I love to sail forbidden seas, and land on barbarous coasts. Not ignoring what is good, I am quick to perceive a horror, and could still be social with it."

Ishmael also mirrors the epistemological uncertainty of Renaissance humanists. For example, Browne argues that "where there is an obscurity too deepe for our reason ... [reason] becomes more humble and submissive unto the subtilties of faith.... I believe there was already a tree whose fruit our unhappy parents tasted, though in the same chapter, when God forbids it, 'tis positivley said, the plants of the field were not yet growne." Ishmael similarly embraces paradox when he proclaims "Doubts of all things earthly, and intuitions of some things heavenly; this combination makes neither believer nor infidel, but makes a man who regards them both with equal eye."

Scholars have also called attention to similarities between Melville's style and that of Robert Burton in Anatomy of Melancholy. William Engel notes that Melville had Burton's book at his side, and says "this encyclopedic work will serve as a conceptual touchstone for analyzing his looking back to an earlier aesthetic practice." Additionally, Hershel Parker writes that in 1847, Anatomy of Melancholy served as Melville's "sonorous textbook on morbid psychology" and in the following year he bought a set of Michel de Montaigne's works. In the Essays he found "a worldly wise skepticism that braced him against the superficial pieties demanded by his time". Melville then read Browne's Religio Medici which he adored, describing Browne to a friend as "a kind of 'crack'd archangel'".

== Background ==
=== Autobiographical elements ===
Moby-Dick draws on Melville's experience on the whaler Acushnet, but is not autobiographical. On December 30, 1840, Melville signed on as a green hand for the maiden voyage of the Acushnet, planned to last for 52 months. Its owner, Melvin O. Bradford, like Bildad, was a Quaker: on several instances when he signed documents, he erased the word "swear" and replaced it with "affirm". However, the shareholders of the Acushnet were relatively wealthy, whereas the owners of the Pequod included poor widows and orphaned children.

The model for the Whaleman's Chapel of chapter 7 is the Seamen's Bethel on Johnny Cake Hill. Melville attended a service there shortly before he shipped out on the Acushnet, and he heard a sermon by Reverend Enoch Mudge, who is at least in part the inspiration for Father Mapple. Even the topic of Jonah and the Whale may be authentic, for Mudge contributed sermons on Jonah to Sailor's Magazine.

The crew was not as heterogenous or exotic as the crew of the Pequod. Five were foreigners, four of them Portuguese, and the others were American either at birth or naturalized. Three black men were in the crew, two seamen and the cook. Fleece, the black cook of the Pequod, was probably modeled on this Philadelphia-born William Maiden. A first mate, actually called Edward C. Starbuck was discharged at Tahiti under mysterious circumstances. The second mate, John Hall, is identified as Stubb in an annotation in the book's copy of crew member Henry Hubbard, who also identified the model for Pip: John Backus, a little black man added to the crew during the voyage. Hubbard witnessed Pip's fall into the water.

Ahab seems to have had no model, though his death may have been based on an actual event. Melville was aboard The Star in May 1843 with two sailors from the Nantucket who could have told him that they had seen their second mate "taken out of a whaleboat by a foul line and drowned".

=== Whaling sources ===
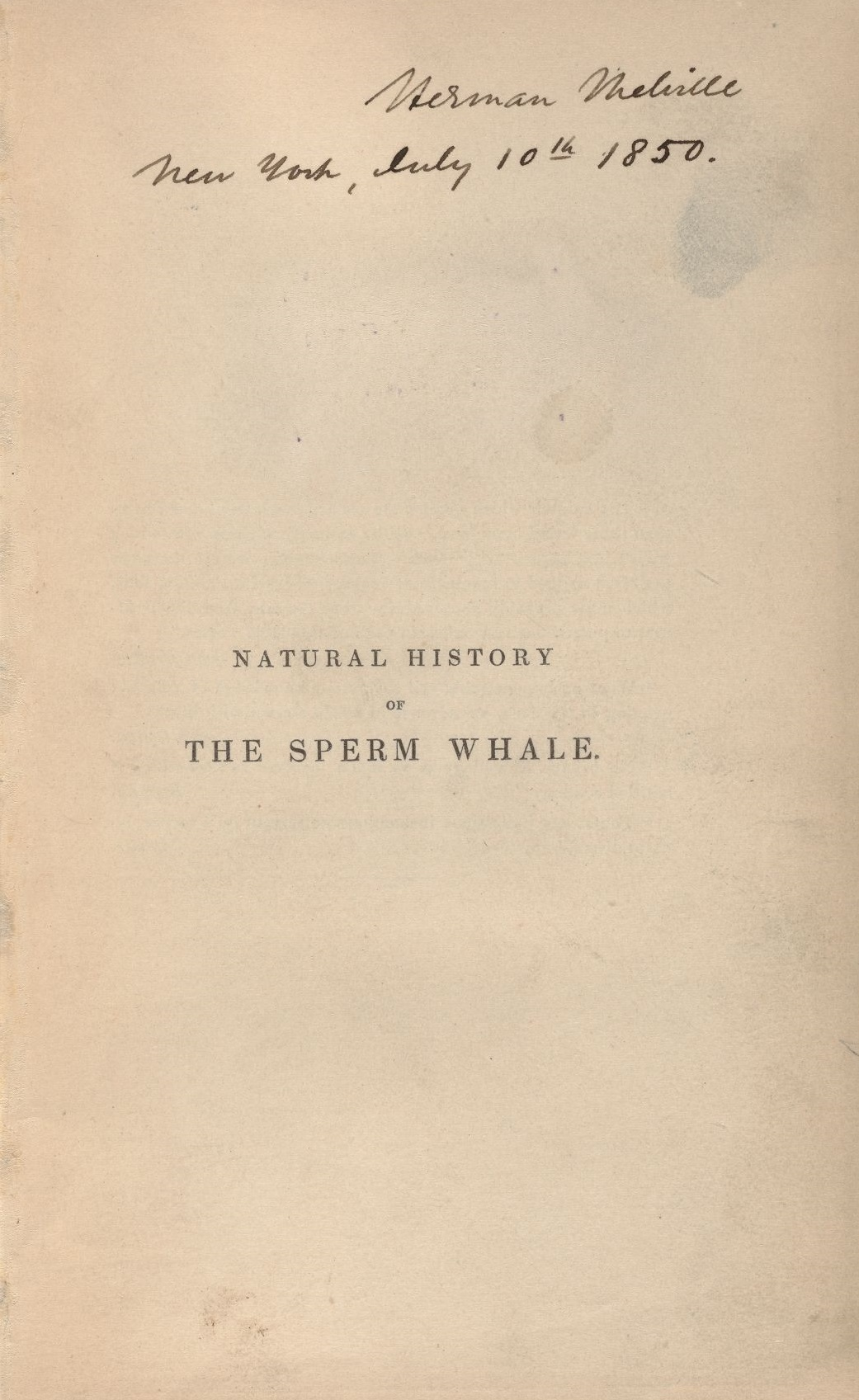
Melville's copy of Natural History of the Sperm Whale, published in 1839

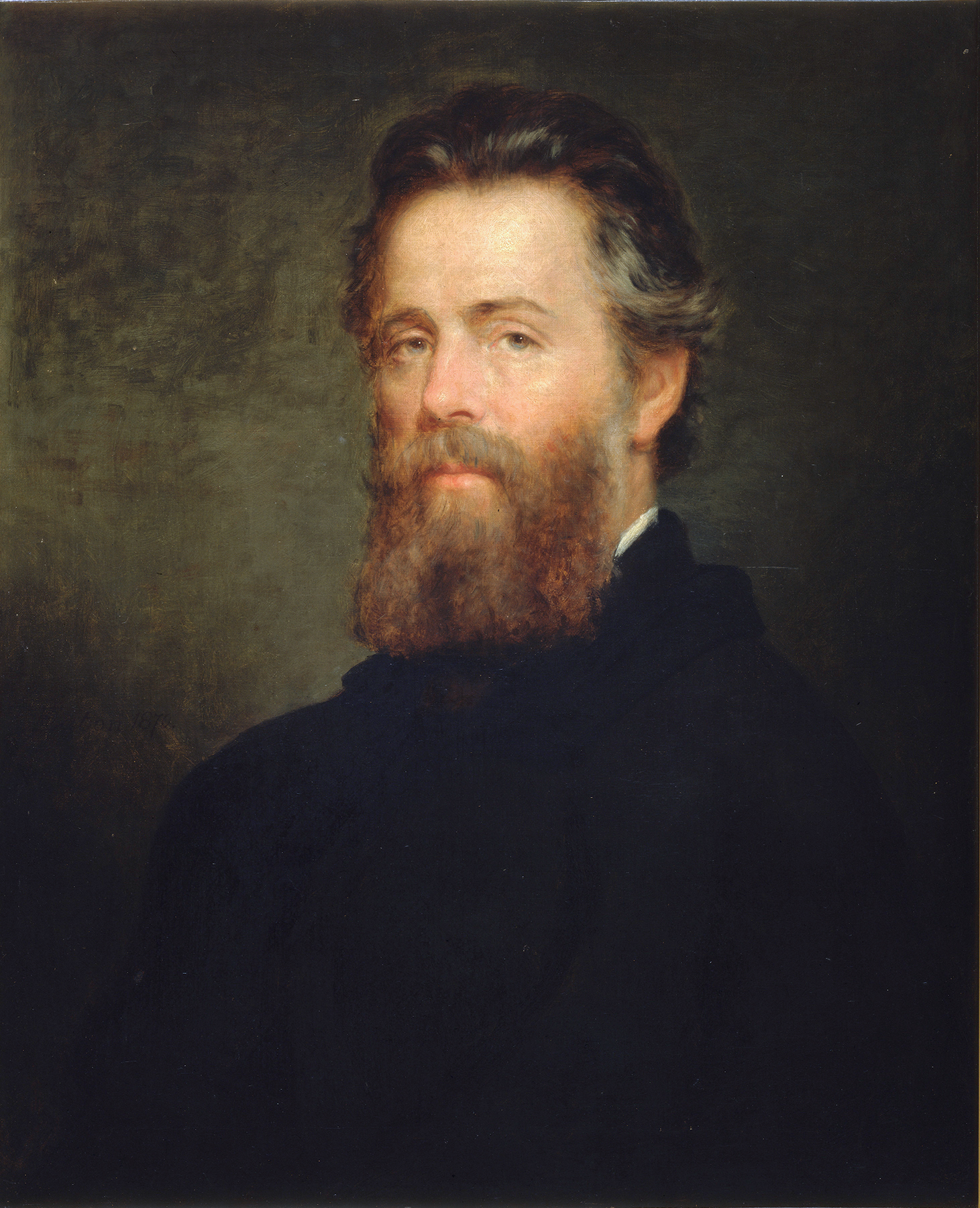
A portrait of Moby-Dick author Herman Melville

In addition to his own experience on the whaling ship Acushnet, two actual events served as the genesis for Melville's tale. One was the sinking of the Nantucket ship Essex in 1820, after a sperm whale rammed her 2,000 miles (3,200 km) from the western coast of South America. First mate Owen Chase, one of eight survivors, recorded the events in his 1821 Narrative of the Most Extraordinary and Distressing Shipwreck of the Whale-Ship Essex.

The other event was the alleged killing in the late 1830s of the albino sperm whale Mocha Dick, in the waters off the Chilean island of Mocha. Mocha Dick was rumored to have 20 or so harpoons in his back from other whalers, and appeared to attack ships with premeditated ferocity. One of his battles with a whaler served as subject for an article by explorer J. N. Reynolds in the May 1839 issue of The Knickerbocker or New-York Monthly Magazine. Melville was familiar with the article, which described:

This renowned monster, who had come off victorious in a hundred fights with his pursuers, was an old bull whale, of prodigious size and strength. From the effect of age, or more probably from a freak of nature ... a singular consequence had resulted — he was white as wool!

Significantly, Reynolds writes a first-person narration that serves as a frame for the story of a whaling captain he meets. The captain resembles Ahab and suggests a similar symbolism and single-minded motivation in hunting this whale, in that when his crew first encounters Mocha Dick and cowers from him, the captain rallies them:

As he drew near, with his long curved back looming occasionally above the surface of the billows, we perceived that it was white as the surf around him; and the men stared aghast at each other, as they uttered, in a suppressed tone, the terrible name of MOCHA DICK! "Mocha Dick or the d----l [devil]', said I, 'this boat never sheers off from any thing that wears the shape of a whale.'"

Mocha Dick had over 100 encounters with whalers in the decades between 1810 and the 1830s. He was described as being gigantic and covered in barnacles. Although he was the most famous, Mocha Dick was not the only white whale in the sea, nor the only whale to attack hunters.

While an accidental collision with a sperm whale at night accounted for sinking of the Union in 1807, it was not until August 1851 that the whaler Ann Alexander, while hunting in the Pacific off the Galápagos Islands, became the second vessel since the Essex to be attacked, holed, and sunk by a whale. Melville remarked, "Ye Gods! What a commentator is this Ann Alexander whale. What he has to say is short & pithy & very much to the point. I wonder if my evil art has raised this monster."

While Melville had already drawn on his different sailing experiences in his previous novels, such as Mardi, he had never focused specifically on whaling. The 18 months he spent as an ordinary seaman aboard the whaler Acushnet in 1841–42, and one incident in particular, now served as inspiration. During a mid-ocean "gam" (rendezvous at sea between ships), he met Chase's son William, who lent him his father's book. Melville later wrote:

I questioned him concerning his father's adventure; ... he went to his chest & handed me a complete copy ... of the Narrative [of the Essex catastrophe]. This was the first printed account of it I had ever seen. The reading of this wondrous story on the landless sea, and so close to the very latitude of the shipwreck, had a surprising effect upon me.

The book was out of print, and rare. Melville let his interest in the book be known to his father-in-law, Lemuel Shaw, whose friend in Nantucket procured an imperfect but clean copy which Shaw gave to Melville in April 1851. Melville read this copy avidly, made copious notes in it, and had it bound, keeping it in his library for the rest of his life.

Moby-Dick contains large sections, most of which are narrated by Ishmael, that seemingly have nothing to do with the plot, but describe aspects of the whaling business. Although a successful earlier novel about Nantucket whalers had been written, Miriam Coffin or The Whale-Fisherman (1835) by Joseph C. Hart, which is credited with influencing elements of Melville's work, most accounts of whaling tended to be sensational tales of bloody mutiny. Melville believed that no book up to that time had portrayed the whaling industry in as fascinating or immediate a way as he had experienced it.

Melville found the bulk of his data on whales and whaling in five books, the most important of which was by the English ship's surgeon Thomas Beale, Natural History of the Sperm Whale (1839), a book of reputed authority which Melville bought on July 10, 1850. "In scale and complexity," scholar Steven Olsen-Smith writes, "the significance of [this source] to the composition of Moby-Dick surpasses that of any other source book from which Melville is known to have drawn." According to scholar Howard P. Vincent, the general influence of this source is to supply the arrangement of whaling data in chapter groupings. Melville followed Beale's grouping closely, yet adapted it to what art demanded, and he changed the original's prosaic phrases into graphic figures of speech. The second most important whaling book is Frederick Debell Bennett, A Whaling Voyage Round the Globe, from the Year 1833 to 1836 (1840), from which Melville also took the chapter organization, but in a lesser degree than he learned from Beale.

The third book was the one Melville reviewed for the Literary World in 1847, J. Ross Browne's Etchings of a Whaling Cruise (1846), which may have given Melville the first thought for a whaling book, and in any case contains passages embarrassingly similar to passages in Moby-Dick. The fourth book, Reverend Henry T. Cheever's The Whale and His Captors (1850), was used for two episodes in Moby-Dick but probably appeared too late in the writing of the novel to be of much more use. Melville did plunder a fifth book, William Scoresby Jr., An Account of the Arctic Regions with a History and Description of the Northern Whale Fishery (1820), though—unlike the other four books—its subject is the Greenland whale rather than the sperm whale. Although the book became the standard whaling reference soon after publication, Melville satirized and parodied it on several occasions—for instance in the description of narwhales in the chapter "Cetology", where he called Scoresby "Charley Coffin" and gave his account "a humorous twist of fact": "Scoresby will help out Melville several times, and on each occasion Melville will satirize him under a pseudonym." Vincent suggests several reasons for Melville's attitude towards Scoresby, including his dryness and abundance of irrelevant data, but the major reason seems to have been that the Greenland whale was the sperm whale's closest competitor for the public's attention, so Melville felt obliged to dismiss anything dealing with it.

In addition to cetological works, Melville also consulted scattered literary works that mention or discuss whales, as the opening "Extracts" section of the novel demonstrates. For instance, Thomas Browne's essay "Of Sperma-Ceti, and the Sperma-Ceti Whale" from his Pseudodoxia Epidemica is consulted not only in the extracts but also in the chapter titled "Cetology". Ishmael notes: "Many are the men, small and great, old and new, landsmen and seamen, who have at large or in little, written of the whale. Run over a few:—The Authors of the Bible; Aristotle; Pliny; Aldrovandi; Sir Thomas Browne." Browne's playful examination of whales, which values philosophical interpretations over scientifically accurate examinations, helped shape the novel's style. Browne's comment on "the [Sperm-Whale's] eyes but small, the pizell [penis] large, and prominent" likely helped shape the comical chapter concerning whale penises, "The Cassock".

=== Composition ===
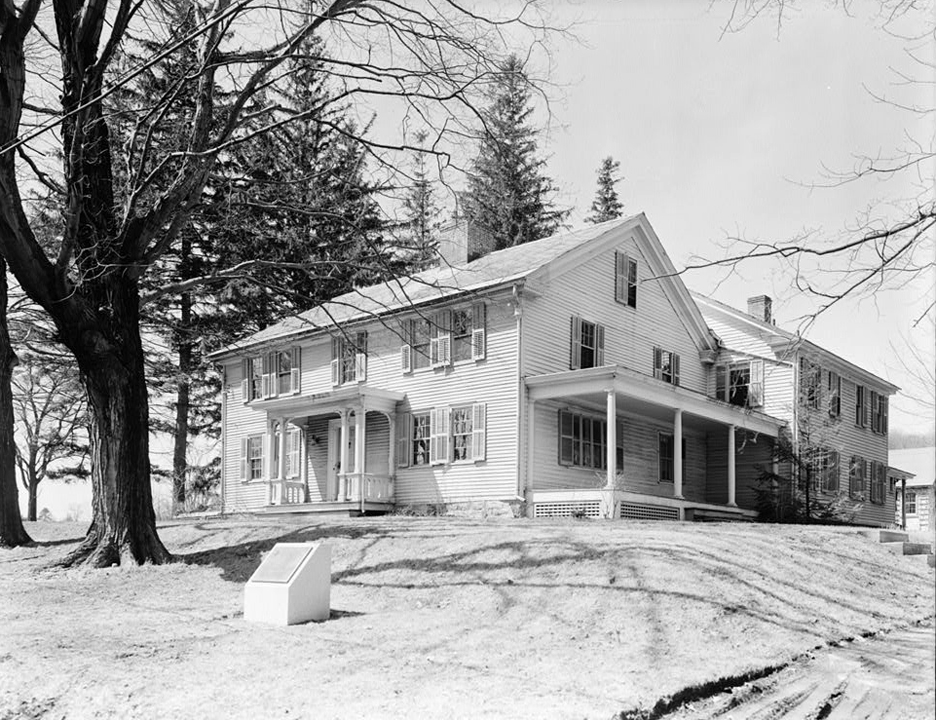
Arrowhead, the house in Pittsfield, Massachusetts where Melville wrote most of Moby-Dick over the winter of 1850–1851

Scholars have concluded that Melville composed Moby-Dick in two or even three stages. Reasoning from biographical evidence, analysis of the functions of characters, and a series of unexplained but perhaps meaningful inconsistencies in the final version, they hypothesize that reading Shakespeare and his new friendship with Hawthorne, in the words of Lawrence Buell, inspired Melville to rewrite a "relatively straightforward" whaling adventure into "an epic of cosmic encyclopedic proportions".

The earliest surviving mention of what became Moby-Dick is a letter Melville wrote to Richard Henry Dana Jr. on May 1, 1850:

About the "whaling voyage"—I am half way in the work, & am very glad that your suggestion so jumps with mine. It will be a strange sort of book, tho', I fear; blubber is blubber you know; tho' you may get oil out of it, the poetry runs as hard as sap from a frozen maple tree; — & to cook the thing up, one must needs throw in a little fancy, which from the nature of the thing, must be ungainly as the gambols of the whales themselves. Yet I mean to give the truth of the thing, spite of this.

Bezanson objects that the letter contains too many ambiguities to assume "that Dana's 'suggestion' would obviously be that Melville do for whaling what he had done for life on a man-of-war in White-Jacket". Dana had experienced how incomparable Melville was in dramatic storytelling when he met him in Boston, so perhaps "his 'suggestion' was that Melville do a book that captured that gift". And the long sentence in the middle of the above quotation simply acknowledges that Melville is struggling with the problem, not of choosing between fact and fancy but of how to interrelate them. The most positive statements are that it will be a strange sort of a book and that Melville means to give the truth of the thing, but what thing exactly is not clear.

Melville may have found the plot before writing or developed it after the writing process was underway. Considering his elaborate use of sources, "it is safe to say" that they helped him shape the narrative, its plot included. Scholars John Bryant and Haskell Springer cite the development of the character Ishmael as another factor which prolonged Melville's process of composition and which can be deduced from the structure of the final version of the book. Ishmael, in the early chapters, is simply the narrator, just as the narrators in Melville's earlier sea adventures had been, but in later chapters becomes a mystical stage manager who is central to the tragedy.

Less than two months after mentioning the project to Dana, Melville reported in a letter of June 27 to Richard Bentley, his English publisher:

My Dear Sir, — In the latter part of the coming autumn I shall have ready a new work; and I write you now to propose its publication in England. The book is a romance of adventure, founded upon certain wild legends in the Southern Sperm Whale Fisheries, and illustrated by the author's own personal experience, of two years & more, as a harpooneer.

Nathaniel Hawthorne and his family had moved to a small red farmhouse near Lenox, Massachusetts, at the end of March 1850. He met Melville on August 5, 1850, when the authors met at a picnic hosted by a mutual friend that included, among others, Oliver Wendell Holmes Sr. and James T. Fields. Melville wrote an unsigned review of Hawthorne's short story collection Mosses from an Old Manse titled "Hawthorne and His Mosses", which appeared in The Literary World on August 17 and 24. Bezanson finds the essay "so deeply related to Melville's imaginative and intellectual world while writing Moby-Dick" that it could be regarded as a virtual preface and should be "everybody's prime piece of contextual reading". In the essay, Melville compares Hawthorne to Shakespeare and Dante, and his "self-projection" is evident in the repeats of the word "genius", the more than two dozen references to Shakespeare, and in the insistence that Shakespeare's "unapproachability" is nonsense for an American.

The most intense work on the book was done during the winter of 1850–1851, when Melville had changed the noise of New York City for a farm in Pittsfield, Massachusetts. The move may well have delayed finishing the book. During these months, he wrote several excited letters to Hawthorne, including one of June 1851 in which he summarizes his career: "What I feel most moved to write, that is banned,—it will not pay. Yet, altogether, write the other way I cannot. So the product is a final hash, and all my books are botches."

This is the stubborn Melville who stood by Mardi and talked about his other, more commercial books with contempt. The letter also reveals how Melville experienced his development from his 25th year: "Three weeks have scarcely passed, at any time between then and now, that I have not unfolded within myself. But I feel that I am now come to the inmost leaf of the bulb, and that shortly the flower must fall to the mould."

Buell finds the evidence that Melville changed his ambitions during writing "on the whole convincing", since the impact of Shakespeare and Hawthorne was "surely monumental", but others challenge the theories of the composition in three ways. The first raises objections on the use of evidence and the evidence itself. Bryant finds "little concrete evidence, and nothing at all conclusive, to show that Melville radically altered the structure or conception of the book" and scholar Robert Milder sees "insufficient evidence and doubtful methodology" at work. A second type of objection is based on assumptions about Melville's intellectual development. Bryant and Springer object to the conclusion that Hawthorne inspired Melville to write Ahab's tragic obsession into the book; Melville already had experienced other encounters which could just as well have triggered his imagination, such as the Bible's Jonah and Job, Milton's Satan, Shakespeare's King Lear, Byron's heroes. Bezanson is also not convinced that before he met Hawthorne, "Melville was not ready for the kind of book Moby-Dick became", because in his letters from the time Melville denounces his last two "straight narratives, Redburn and White-Jacket, as two books written just for the money, and he firmly stood by Mardi as the kind of book he believed in. His language is already "richly steeped in 17th-century mannerisms", characteristics of Moby-Dick. A third type calls upon the literary nature of passages used as evidence. According to Milder, the cetological chapters cannot be leftovers from an earlier stage of composition and any theory that they are "will eventually founder on the stubborn meaningfulness of these chapters", because no scholar adhering to the theory has yet explained how these chapters "can bear intimate thematic relation to a symbolic story not yet conceived".

Buell finds that theories based on a combination of selected passages from letters and what are perceived as "loose ends" in the book not only "tend to dissolve into guesswork", but he also suggests that these so-called loose ends may be intended by the author: repeatedly the book mentions "the necessary unfinishedness of immense endeavors".

== Publication history ==
Melville first proposed the British publication in a June 27, 1850, letter to Richard Bentley, London publisher of his earlier works. Textual scholar G. Thomas Tanselle said that, in these earlier books, American proof sheets had been sent to the British publisher and that publication in the United States did not commence until the work had been set in type and published in England. This procedure was intended to provide the best (though still uncertain) claim for the UK copyright of an American work. In the case of Moby-Dick, Melville had taken almost a year longer than promised, and could not rely on Harpers to prepare the proofs as they had done for the earlier books. Indeed, Harpers had denied him an advance, and since he was already in debt to them for almost $700, he was forced to borrow money and to arrange for the typesetting and plating himself. John Bryant suggests that he did so "to reduce the number of hands playing with his text".

The final stages of composition overlapped with the early stages of publication. At the end of May 1851, Melville delivered the bulk of his manuscript to Harper's for plating and printing of proof sheets. In June, he wrote to Hawthorne that he was in New York to "work and slave on my 'Whale' while it is driving through the press". He was staying with Allan and Sophia in a small room to correct proofs, and to (re)write the closing pages. By the end of the month, "wearied with the long delay of printers", Melville came back to finish work on the book in Pittsfield. Three weeks later, the typesetting was almost done, as he announced to Bentley on July 20: "I am now passing thro' the press, the closing sheets of my new work". While Melville was simultaneously writing and proofreading what had been set, the corrected proof would be plated, that is, the type fixed in final form. Since earlier chapters were already plated when he was revising the later ones, Melville must have "felt restricted in the kinds of revisions that were feasible".

On July 3, 1851, Bentley offered Melville £150 and "half profits", that is, half the profits that remained after the expenses of production and advertising. On July 20, Melville accepted, after which Bentley drew up a contract on August 13. Melville signed and returned the contract in early September, and then went to New York with the proof sheets, made from the finished plates, which he sent to London by his brother Allan on September 10. For over a month, these proofs had been in Melville's possession, and because the book would be set anew in London he could devote all his time to correcting and revising them. He still had no American publisher, so the usual hurry about getting the British publication to precede the American was not present. Only on September 12 was the Harper publishing contract signed. Bentley received the proof sheets with Melville's corrections and revisions marked on them on September 24. He published the book less than four weeks later.

In the October 1851 issue of Harper's New Monthly Magazine "The Town Ho's Story" was published, with a footnote reading: "From 'The Whale'. The title of a new work by Mr. Melville, in the press of Harper and Brothers, and now publishing in London by Mr. Bentley."

On October 18, the British edition, The Whale, was published in a printing of only 500 copies, fewer than Melville's previous books. Their slow sales had convinced Bentley that a smaller number was more realistic. The London Morning Herald on October 20 printed the earliest known review. On November 14, the American edition, Moby-Dick, was published and the same day reviewed in both the Albany Argus and the Morning Courier and New-York Enquirer. On November 19, Washington received the copy to be deposited for copyright purposes. The first American printing of 2,915 copies was almost the same as the first of Mardi, but the first printing of Melville's other three Harper books had been a thousand copies more.

=== Melville's revisions and British editorial revisions ===
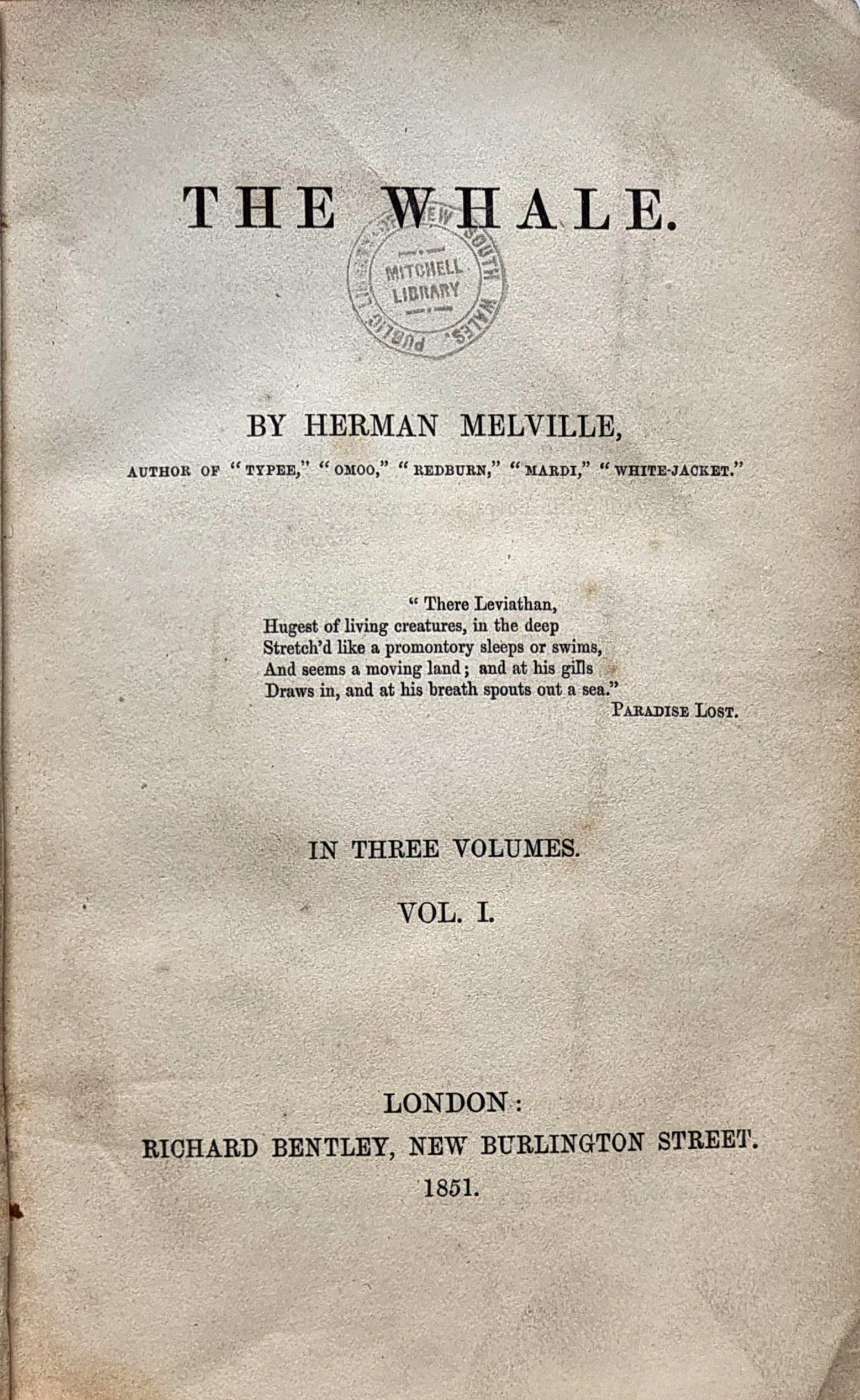
The whale or Moby Dick (half-title page), Herman Melville, 1851

The British edition, set by Bentley's printers from the American page proofs with Melville's revisions and corrections, differs from the American edition in over 700 wordings and thousands of punctuation and spelling changes.

Excluding the preliminaries and the one extract, the three volumes of the British edition came to 927 pages and the single American volume to 635 pages. Accordingly, the dedication to Hawthorne in the American edition—"this book is inscribed to"—became "these volumes are inscribed to" in the British. The table of contents in the British edition generally follows the actual chapter titles in the American edition, but 19 titles in the American table of contents differ from the titles above the chapters themselves. This list was probably drawn up by Melville himself: the titles of chapters describing encounters of the Pequod with other ships had—apparently to stress the parallelisms between these chapters—been standardized to "The Pequod meets the ...," with the exception of the already published 'The Town-Ho's Story'.

For unknown reasons, the "Etymology" and "Extracts" were moved to the end of the third volume. An epigraph from Paradise Lost, taken from the second of the two quotations from that work in the American edition, appears on the title page of each of the three British volumes. Melville's involvement with this rearrangement is not clear: if it was Bentley's gesture toward accommodating Melville, as Tanselle suggests, its selection put an emphasis on the quotation Melville might not have agreed with.

The largest of Melville's revisions is the addition to the British edition of a 139-word footnote in Chapter 87 explaining the word "gally". The edition also contains six short phrases and some 60 single words lacking in the American edition. In addition, about 35 changes produce genuine improvements, as opposed to mere corrections: "Melville may not have made every one of the changes in this category, but it seems certain that he was responsible for the great majority of them."

=== British censorship and missing "Epilogue" ===
The British publisher hired one or more revisers who were, in the evaluation of scholar Steven Olsen-Smith, responsible for "unauthorized changes ranging from typographical errors and omissions to acts of outright censorship". According to biographer Robertson-Lorant, the result was that the British edition was "badly mutilated". The expurgations fall into four categories, ranked according to the apparent priorities of the censor:

1. Sacrilegious passages, more than 1,200 words: Attributing human failures to God was grounds for excision or revision, as was comparing human shortcomings to divine ones. For example, in chapter 28, "Ahab", Ahab stands with "a crucifixion in his face" was revised to "an apparently eternal anguish";
2. Sexual matters, including the sex life of whales and even Ishmael's worried anticipation of the nature of Queequeg's underwear, as well as allusions to fornication or harlots, and "our hearts' honeymoon" (in relation to Ishmael and Queequeg). Chapter 95, however, "The Cassock", referring to the whale's genital organ, was untouched, perhaps because of Melville's indirect language.
3. Remarks "belittling royalty or implying a criticism of the British": This meant the exclusion of the complete chapter 25, a "Postscript" on the use of sperm oil at coronations;
4. Perceived grammatical or stylistic anomalies were treated with "a highly conservative interpretation of rules of 'correctness'".

These expurgations also meant that any corrections or revisions Melville had marked upon these passages are now lost.

The final difference in the material not already plated is that the "Epilogue", thus Ishmael's miraculous survival, is omitted from the British edition. Obviously, the epilogue was not an afterthought supplied too late for the edition, for it is referred to in "The Castaway": "in the sequel of the narrative, it will then be seen what like abandonment befell myself." Why the "Epilogue" is missing is unknown. Since nothing objectionable was in it, most likely it was somehow lost by Bentley's printer when the "Etymology" and "Extracts" were moved.

=== Last-minute change of title ===
After the sheets had been sent, Melville changed the title. Probably late in September, Allan sent Bentley two pages of proof with a letter of which only a draft survives which informed him that Melville "has determined upon a new title & dedication—Enclosed you have proof of both—It is thought here that the new title will be a better selling title". After expressing his hope that Bentley would receive this change in time, Allan said that "Moby-Dick is a legitimate title for the book, being the name given to a particular whale who if I may so express myself is the hero of the volume". Biographer Hershel Parker suggests that the reason for the change was that Harper's had two years earlier published a book with a similar title, The Whale and His Captors.

Changing the title was not a problem for the American edition, since the running heads throughout the book only showed the titles of the chapters, and the title page, which would include the publisher's name, could not be printed until a publisher was found. In October Harper's New Monthly Magazine printed chapter 54, "The Town-Ho's Story", with a footnote saying: "From The Whale. The title of a new work by Mr. Melville". The one surviving leaf of proof, "a 'trial' page bearing the title 'The Whale' and the Harper imprint," shows that at this point, after the publisher had been found, the original title still stood. When Allan's letter arrived, no sooner than early October, Bentley had already announced The Whale in both the Athenaem and the Spectator of October 4 and 11. Probably to accommodate Melville, Bentley inserted a half-title page in the first volume only, which reads "The Whale; or, Moby Dick".

=== Sales and earnings ===
The British printing of 500 copies sold fewer than 300 within the first four months. In 1852, some remaining sheets were bound in a cheaper casing, and in 1853, enough sheets were still left to issue a cheap edition in one volume. Bentley recovered only half on the £150 he advanced Melville, whose share from actual sales would have been just £38, and he did not print a new edition. Harper's first printing was 2,915 copies, including the standard 125 review copies. The selling price was $1.50, about a fifth of the price of the British three-volume edition.

About 1,500 copies were sold within 11 days, and then sales slowed down to less than 300 the next year. After three years, the first edition was still available, almost 300 copies of which were lost when a fire broke out at the firm in December 1853. In 1855, a second printing of 250 copies was issued, in 1863, a third of 253 copies, and finally in 1871, a fourth printing of 277 copies, which sold so slowly that no new printing was ordered. Moby-Dick was out of print during the last four years of Melville's life, having sold 2,300 in its first year and a half and on average 27 copies a year for the next 34 years, totaling 3,215 copies.

Melville's earnings from the book add up to $1,260: the £150 advance from Bentley was equivalent to $703, and the American printings earned him $556, which was $100 less than he earned from any of his five previous books. Melville's widow received another $81 when the United States Book Company issued the book and sold almost 1,800 copies between 1892 and 1898.

== Reception ==
The reception of The Whale in Britain and of Moby-Dick in the United States differed in two ways, according to Parker. First, British literary criticism was more sophisticated and developed than in the still-young republic, with British reviewing done by "cadres of brilliant literary people" who were "experienced critics and trenchant prose stylists", while the United States had only "a handful of reviewers" capable enough to be called critics, and American editors and reviewers habitually echoed British opinion. American reviewing was mostly delegated to "newspaper staffers" or else by "amateur contributors more noted for religious piety than critical acumen." Second, the differences between the two editions caused "two distinct critical receptions."

=== British ===
Twenty-one reviews appeared in London, and later one in Dublin. The British reviewers, according to Parker, mostly regarded The Whale as "a phenomenal literary work, a philosophical, metaphysical, and poetic romance". The Morning Advertiser for October 24 was in awe of Melville's learning, of his "dramatic ability for producing a prose poem", and of the whale adventures which were "powerful in their cumulated horrors." To its surprise, John Bull found "philosophy in whales" and "poetry in blubber", and concluded that few books that claimed to be either philosophical or literary works "contain as much true philosophy and as much genuine poetry as the tale of the Pequod's whaling expedition", making it a work "far beyond the level of an ordinary work of fiction". The Morning Post found it "one of the cleverest, wittiest, and most amusing of modern books", and predicted that it was a book "which will do great things for the literary reputation of its author".

Melville himself never saw these reviews, and Parker calls it a "bitter irony" that the reception overseas was "all he could possibly have hoped for, short of a few conspicuous proclamations that the distance between him and Shakespeare was by no means immeasurable."

One of the earliest reviews, by the extremely conservative critic Henry Chorley in the highly regarded London Athenaeum, described it as

[A]n ill-compounded mixture of romance and matter-of-fact. The idea of a connected and collected story has obviously visited and abandoned its writer again and again in the course of composition. The style of his tale is in places disfigured by mad (rather than bad) English; and its catastrophe is hastily, weakly, and obscurely managed.

According to the London Literary Gazette and Journal of Science and Art for December 6, 1851, "Mr. Melville cannot do without savages, so he makes half of his dramatis personae wild Indians, Malays, and other untamed humanities", who appeared in "an odd book, professing to be a novel; wantonly eccentric, outrageously bombastic; in places charmingly and vividly descriptive". Most critics regretted the extravagant digressions because they distracted from an otherwise interesting and even exciting narrative, but even critics who did not like the book as a whole praised Melville's originality of imagination and expression.

Because the English edition omitted the epilogue describing Ishmael's escape, British reviewers read a book with a first-person narrator who apparently did not survive. The reviewer of the Literary Gazette asked how Ishmael, "who appears to have been drowned with the rest, communicated his notes to Mr. Bentley". The reviewer in the Spectator objected that "nothing should be introduced into a novel which it is physically impossible for the writer to have known: thus, he must not describe the conversation of miners in a pit if they all perish." The Dublin University Magazine asked "how does it happen that the author is alive to tell the story?" A few other reviewers, who did not comment upon the apparent impossibility of Ishmael telling the story, pointed out violations of narrative conventions in other passages.

Other reviewers accepted the flaws they perceived. John Bull praised the author for making literature out of unlikely and even unattractive matter, and the Morning Post found that delight far outstripped the improbable character of events. Though some reviewers viewed the characters, especially Ahab, as exaggerated, others felt that it took an extraordinary character to undertake the battle with the white whale. Melville's style was often praised, although some found it excessive or too American.

=== American ===
Some sixty reviews appeared in America, the criterion for counting as a review being more than two lines of comment. Only a couple of reviewers expressed themselves early enough not to be influenced by news of the British reception. Though Moby-Dick did contain the Epilogue and so accounted for Ishmael's survival, the British reviews influenced the American reception. The earliest American review, in the Boston Post for November 20, quoted the London Athenaeum's scornful review, not realizing that some of the criticism of The Whale did not pertain to Moby-Dick. This last point, and the authority and influence of British criticism in American reviewing, is clear from the review's opening: "We have read nearly one half of this book, and are satisfied that the London Athenaeum is right in calling it 'an ill-compounded mixture of romance and matter-of-fact'". Though the Post quoted the greater portion of the review, it omitted the condensed extract of Melville's prose the Athenaeum had included to give readers an example of it. The Post deemed the price of one dollar and fifty cents far too much: "'The Whale' is not worth the money asked for it, either as a literary work or as a mass of printed paper".

The New York North American Miscellany for December summarized the verdict in the Athenaeum. The reviewer of the December New York Eclectic Magazine had actually read Moby-Dick in full, and was puzzled why the Athenaeum was so scornful of the ending. The attack on The Whale by the Spectator was reprinted in the December New York International Magazine, which inaugurated the influence of another unfavorable review. Rounding off what American readers were told about the British reception, in January Harper's Monthly Magazine attempted some damage control, and wrote that the book had "excited a general interest" among the London magazines.

The most influential American review, ranked according to the number of references to it, appeared in the weekly magazine Literary World, which had printed Melville's "Mosses" essay the preceding year. The author of the unsigned review in two installments, on November 15 and 22, was later identified as publisher Evert Duyckinck. The first half of the first installment was devoted to an event of remarkable coincidence: early in the month, between the publishing of the British and the American edition, a whale had sunk the New Bedford whaler Ann Alexander near Chile.

In the second installment, Duyckinck described Moby-Dick as three books rolled into one: he was pleased with the book as far as it was a thorough account of the sperm whale, less so with it as far as the adventures of the Pequod crew were considered, perceiving the characters as unrealistic and expressing inappropriate opinions on religions, and condemned the essayistic rhapsodizing and moralizing with what he thought was little respect of what "must be to the world the most sacred associations of life violated and defaced." The review prompted Hawthorne to take the "unusually aggressive step of reproving Duyckinck" by criticizing the review in a letter to Duyckinck of December 1:

What a book Melville has written! It gives me an idea of much greater power than his preceding ones. It hardly seemed to me that the review of it, in the Literary World, did justice to its best points.

The Transcendental socialist George Ripley published a review in the New York Tribune for November 22, in which he compared the book favorably to Mardi, because the "occasional touches of the subtle mysticism" was not carried on to excess but kept within boundaries by the solid realism of the whaling context. Ripley was almost surely also the author of the review in Harper's for December, which saw in Ahab's quest the "slight framework" for something else: "Beneath the whole story, the subtle, imaginative reader may perhaps find a pregnant allegory, intended to illustrate the mystery of human life." Among the handful of other favorable reviews was one in the Albion on November 22 which saw the book as a blend of truth and satire.

Melville's friend Nathaniel Parker Willis, reviewing the book in November 29 Home Journal, found it "a very racy, spirited, curious and entertaining book ... it enlists the curiosity, excites the sympathies, and often charms the fancy". In December 6 Spirit of the Times, editor William T. Porter praised the book, and all of Melville's five earlier works, as the writings "of a man who is at once philosopher, painter, and poet". Some other, shorter reviews mixed their praise with genuine reservations about the "irreverence and profane jesting", as the New Haven Daily Palladium for November 17 phrased it. Many reviewers, Parker observes, had come to the conclusion that Melville was capable of producing enjoyable romances, but they could not see in him the author of great literature.

Reviewers who actually did read the book "found much to praise," Robertson-Lorant writes, but conservative reviewers did not like it. A friend of Duyckinck's, William Allen Butler, protested in the National Intelligencer against "the querulous and cavilling innuendoes" and the "irreverent wit," while the Boston Post called it "a crazy sort of affair."

== Legacy and adaptations ==
Within a year after Melville's death in 1891, Moby-Dick, along with Typee, Omoo, and Mardi, was reprinted by Harper & Brothers, giving it a chance to be rediscovered. However, only New York's literary underground showed interest, just enough to keep Melville's name circulating for the next 25 years in the capital of American publishing. During this time, a few critics were willing to devote time, space, and a modicum of praise to Melville and his works, or at least those that could still be easily obtained or remembered. Other works, especially the poetry, went largely forgotten.

In 1917, American author Carl Van Doren became the first of this period to proselytize about Melville's value in his 1921 study, The American Novel, calling Moby-Dick a pinnacle of American Romanticism. In his 1923 Studies in Classic American Literature, novelist, poet, and short story writer D. H. Lawrence celebrated the originality and value of American authors, among them Melville. Lawrence saw Moby-Dick as a work of the first order despite his using the expurgated original English edition, which lacked the epilogue. The Modern Library brought out Moby-Dick in 1926, and the Lakeside Press in Chicago commissioned Rockwell Kent to design and illustrate a striking three-volume edition, which appeared in 1930. Random House then issued a one-volume trade version of Kent's edition, which in 1943 they reprinted as a less expensive Modern Library Giant.

The novel has been adapted or represented in art, film, books, cartoons, television, and more than a dozen versions in comic-book format. The first adaptation was the 1926 silent movie The Sea Beast, starring John Barrymore, in which Ahab returns to marry his fiancée after killing the whale. The most famous adaptation was the John Huston 1956 film produced from a screenplay by author Ray Bradbury. The long list of adaptations, as Bryant and Springer put it, demonstrates that "the iconic image of an angry embittered American slaying a mythic beast seemed to capture the popular imagination." They conclude that "different readers in different periods of popular culture have rewritten Moby-Dick" to make it a "true cultural icon". American artist David Klamen has cited the novel as an important influence on his dark, slow-to-disclose paintings, noting a passage in the book in which a mysterious, undecipherable painting in a bar is gradually revealed to depict a whale.

Both Mystic Seaport and the New Bedford Whaling Museum hold annual marathon live readings of Melville's novel in which volunteers read chapters aloud. The Mystic Seaport Marathon Reading is usually held July 31 to August 1 aboard the whaling vessel Charles W. Morgan with an actor portraying Herman Melville reading the first and final chapters, culminating in a celebration of Melville's birthday. The 2025 New Bedford Whaling Museum Marathon was held January 3–5, 2025.

American author Ralph Ellison wrote a tribute to the book in the prologue of his 1952 novel Invisible Man. The narrator remembers a moment of truth under the influence of marijuana and evokes a church service: "Brothers and sisters, my text this morning is the 'Blackness of Blackness.' And the congregation answers: 'That blackness is most black, brother, most black ... '" This scene, Ellison biographer Arnold Rampersad observes, "reprises a moment in the second chapter of Moby-Dick", where Ishmael wanders around New Bedford looking for a place to spend the night, and momentarily joins a congregation: "It was a negro church; and the preacher's text was about the blackness of darkness, and the weeping and wailing and teeth-gnashing there." According to Rampersad, it was Melville who "empowered Ellison to insist on a place in the American literary tradition" by his example of "representing the complexity of race and racism so acutely and generously in his text". Rampersad also believes Ellison's choice of a first-person narrator was inspired above all by Moby-Dick, and the novel even has a similar opening sentence with the narrator introducing himself ("I am an invisible man"). The oration by Ellison's blind preacher Barbee resembles Father Mapple's sermon in that both prepare the reader for what is to come.

In 1961, a Japanese author, Kōichirō Uno, won the Akutagawa Prize with his novel The Whale God, which was later made into a somewhat tangential tokusatsu film by Daiei Film next year. Uno's The Whale God was presumably inspired by Moby-Dick as the former also focuses on vengeful whalers who seek after an unusually large and powerful whale.

The Ice Schooner is a minor work by Michael Moorcock which retells the story in a grimdark post-apocalyptic frontier setting where technology has reverted to an early 19th century level and books, wooden furniture and batteries have become rare and expensive luxuries. Land yachts hunt carnivorous mutant sperm whales during an ice age caused by climate change and nuclear war. Captain Konrad Arflane is driven to misfortune not by hatred of the whale (which he kills early in the story), but by curiosity, namely the desire to discover the lost ancient city of New York and meet the goddess he worships known as the Ice Mother. Urquhart, the counterpart to the harpooner Queequeg, joins a human sacrifice cult and reverts to primitive savagery by castrating and mutilating the idealistic young nobleman Manfred Rorfesne before Arflane is forced to fight and kill him to prevent Urquhart from sacrificing his own sister. The technologically advanced and peaceful inhabitants of New York use a helicopter to return the shipwrecked survivors to their home city of Friesgalt, but Arflane chooses to continue heading North on skis to find the goddess, his ultimate fate unknown.

External videos
- Nantucket Historical Association Conference on Herman Melville, August 14, 2019, C-SPAN

British explorer Tim Severin wrote in his 1999 book In Search of Moby Dick: Quest for the White Whale about traveling throughout the Pacific, inquiring among indigenous fishermen and watermen about white whales, in personal experience or local folklore. American songwriter Bob Dylan's Nobel Prize Acceptance Speech of 2017 cited Moby-Dick as one of the three books that influenced him most. Dylan's description ends with an acknowledgment: "That theme, and all that it implies, would work its way into more than a few of my songs."

== Editions ==
- Melville, H., The Whale. London: Richard Bentley, 1851. 3 vols. (viii, 312; iv, 303; iv, 328 pp.). Published October 18, 1851.
- Melville, H., Moby-Dick; or, The Whale. New York: Harper and Brothers, 1851. xxiii, 635 pages. Published probably on November 14, 1851.
- Melville, H., Moby-Dick; or, The Whale. Edited by Luther S. Mansfield and Howard P. Vincent. New York: Hendricks House, 1952. Includes a 25-page Introduction and over 250 pages of Explanatory Notes with an Index.
- Melville, H., Moby-Dick; or, The Whale: An Authoritative Text, Reviews and Letters by Melville, Analogues and Sources, Criticism. A Norton Critical Edition. Edited by Harrison Hayford and Hershel Parker. New York: W.W. Norton, 1967. ISBN 0-393-09670-X.
- Melville, H. Moby-Dick, or The Whale. Northwestern-Newberry Edition of the Writings of Herman Melville 6. Evanston, Ill.: Northwestern U. Press, 1988. A critical text with appendices on the history and reception of the book.
- Moby-Dick. A Norton Critical Edition. Parker, Hershel, and Harrison Hayford (eds.). Second Edition, New York and London: W.W. Norton & Company. ISBN 978-0-393-97283-2.
- Moby-Dick: A Longman Critical Edition, Edited by John Bryant and Haskell Springer. New York: Longman, 2007 and 2009. ISBN 978-0-321-22800-0.
- Moby-Dick: An Authoritative Text, Contexts, Criticism, Hershel Parker, ed. (W. W. Norton and Company, 2018). ISBN 978-0-393-28500-0.

== General references ==
- Abrams, M. H. (1999). A Glossary of Literary Terms. Seventh Edition. Fort Worth, Texas: Harcourt Brace College Publishers. ISBN 978-0-15-505452-3
- Arvin, Newton (1950). "The Whale." Excerpt from Newton Arvin, Herman Melville (New York: William Sloane Associates, Inc., 1950), in Parker and Hayford (1970).
- Bercaw, Mary K. (1987). Melville's Sources. Evanston, Illinois: Northwestern University Press. ISBN 0-8101-0734-1
- Berthoff, Warner (1962). The Example of Melville. Reprinted 1972, New York: W. W. Norton.
- Bezanson, Walter E. (1953). "Moby-Dick: Work of Art". Reprinted in Parker and Hayford (2001).
- Bezanson, Walter E. (1986). "Moby-Dick: Document, Drama, Dream." In Bryant 1986.
- Branch, Watson G. (1974). Melville: The Critical Heritage. First edition 1974. Paperback edition 1985, London and Boston: Routledge and Kegan Paul. ISBN 0-7102-0513-9
- Bryant, John, ed. (1986). A Companion to Melville Studies. Greenport, CT: Greenwood Press. ISBN 978-0-313-23874-1
- Bryant, John (1998). "Moby-Dick as Revolution". In Levine 1998.
- Bryant, John (2006). "The Melville Text". In Kelley 2006.
- Bryant, John, and Haskell Springer (2007). "Introduction", "Explanatory Notes" and "The Making of Moby-Dick". In John Bryant and Haskell Springer (eds), Herman Melville, Moby-Dick. New York Boston: Pearson Longman (A Longman Critical Edition). ISBN 0-321-22800-6.
- Buell, Lawrence (2014). The Dream of the Great American Novel. Cambridge, MA / London: The Belknap Press of Harvard University Press. ISBN 978-0-674-05115-7.
- Cotkin, George (2012). Dive Deeper: Journeys with Moby-Dick. New York: Oxford University Press. ISBN 978-0-19-985573-5. Chapter by chapter explication of the text and references.
- Delbanco, Andrew (2005). Melville: His World and Work. New York: Knopf. ISBN 978-0-375-40314-9. OCLC 845847813.
- Faulkner, William (1927). "I Wish I Had Written That". Originally in the Chicago Tribune, July 16, 1927. Reprinted in Parker and Hayford (2001), 640.
- Forster, E.M. (1927). Aspects of the Novel. Reprinted Middlesex: Penguin Books 1972. ISBN 0-14-020557-8
- Franklin, H. Bruce (1963). The Wake of the Gods: Melville's Mythology (1st ed.). Stanford University Press. p. 236. ISBN 9780804701372.
- Gale, Robert L. (1972). Plots and Characters in the Fiction and Narrative Poetry of Herman Melville. Cambridge, MA / London: The MIT Press.
- Grey, Robin (2006). "The Legacy of Britain". In Kelley (2006).
- Hayford, Harrison (1988). "Historical Note Section V". In Melville (1988).
- Heflin, Wilson (2004). Herman Melville's Whaling Years. Edited by Mary K. Bercaw Edwards and Thomas Farel Heffernan. Nashville: Vanderbilt University Press.
- Higgins, Brian; Parker, Hershel, eds. (1992). Critical Essays on Herman Melville's Moby Dick. New York: G. K. Hall. ISBN 978-0-8161-7318-1. At Internet Archive Online
- Howard, Leon (1940). "Melville's Struggle with the Angel". Modern Language Quarterly. 1 (2): 195–206. doi:10.1215/00267929-1-2-195. Reprinted in Hershel Parker, ed. (1967). The recognition of Herman Melville; selected criticism since 1846. Ann Arbor, MI: University of Michigan Press. p. 232. OL 5535300M.
- Kelley, Wyn, ed. (2006). A Companion to Herman Melville. Malden, MA, Oxford, UK, and Carlton, Australia: Blackwell Publishing Ltd. ISBN 978-1-4051-2231-3
- King, Richard J. (2019). Ahab's Rolling Sea: A Natural History of Moby-Dick. Chicago: University of Chicago Press.
- Lawrence, D. H. (1923). Studies in Classic American Literature. Reprinted London: Penguin Books. ISBN 978-0-14-018377-1
- Lee, Maurice S. (2006). "The Language of Moby-Dick: 'Read It If You Can'". In Kelley, Wyn (ed.). A Companion to Herman Melville. Malden, MA; Oxford: Blackwell. pp. 393–407. ISBN 1-4051-2231-5.
- Levine, Robert S. (1998). The Cambridge Companion to Herman Melville. Cambridge: Cambridge University Press. ISBN 0-521-55571-X
- Matthiessen, F.O. (1941). American Renaissance: Art and Expression in the Age of Emerson and Whitman. New York, London and Toronto: Oxford University Press. ISBN 978-0-19-972688-2..
- Melville, Herman (1988). Harrison Hayford; Hershel Parker; G. Thomas Tanselle (eds.). Moby-Dick; or, the Whale. Chicago: Northwestern University Press. ISBN 0-8101-0324-9.
- Melville, Herman (1993). Correspondence. The Writings of Herman Melville, Vol. 14, edited by Lynn Horth. Evanston and Chicago: Northwestern University Press and The Newberry Library. ISBN 978-0-8101-0995-7
- Milder, Robert (1977). The Composition of Moby-Dick: A Review and a Prospect." ESQ: A Journal of the American Renaissance.
- Milder, Robert (1988). "Herman Melville." In Emory Elliott (General Editor), Columbia Literary History of the United States. New York: Columbia University Press. ISBN 0-231-05812-8
- Miller, Edwin Haviland (1991). Salem Is My Dwelling Place: A Life of Nathaniel Hawthorne. Iowa City: University of Iowa Press. ISBN 0-87745-332-2
- Olson, Charles (2015) [1947]. Call Me Ishmael, Eastford, Connecticut: Martino Publishing. ISBN 1-61427-907-1.
- Olsen-Smith, Steven (2008). [Review of Bryant and Springer 2007]. Leviathan: A Journal of Melville Studies, June 2008, 96–9.
- Paglia, Camille (2001). "Moby-Dick as Sexual Protest". In Parker and Hayford, eds., 2001.
- Parker, Hershel (1988). "Historical Note Section VII". In Melville (1988).
- Parker, Hershel, and Harrison Hayford, eds. (1970). Moby-Dick as Doubloon: Essays and Extracts (1851-1970). New York: W. W. Norton & Company Inc., 1970.
- Parker, Hershel, and Harrison Hayford, eds. (2001). Herman Melville, Moby-Dick. A Norton Critical Edition. Second Edition, New York and London: W.W. Norton & Company. ISBN 978-0-393-97283-2
- Parker, Hershel (2002). Herman Melville: A Biography. Volume 2, 1851–1891. Baltimore and London: The Johns Hopkins University Press. ISBN 0-8018-6892-0
- Philbrick, Nathaniel (2000). In the Heart of the Sea: The Tragedy of the Whaleship Essex. New York: Viking. ISBN 0-670-89157-6.
- Rampersad, Arnold (1997). "Shadow and Veil: Melville and Modern Black Consciousness." Melville's Evermoving Dawn: Centennial Essays. Edited by John Bryant and Robert Milder. Kent, Ohia, and London, England: The Kent State University Press. ISBN 0-87338-562-4
- Rampersad, Arnold (2007). Ralph Ellison: A Biography. New York: Alfred A. Knopf. ISBN 978-0-375-40827-4
- Robertson-Lorant, Laurie (1996). Melville: A Biography. New York: Clarkson Potters/Publishers. ISBN 0-517-59314-9
- Tanselle, G. Thomas (1988). "Historical Note Section VI", "Note on the Text", and "The Hubbard Copy of The Whale". In Melville (1988).
- Vincent, Howard P. (1949). The Trying-Out of Moby-Dick. Boston: Houghton Mifflin Company.
- Wright, Nathalia (1940). "Biblical Allusion in Melville's Prose." American Literature, May 1940, 185–199.
- Wright, Nathalia. (1949). Melville's Use of the Bible. Durham, North Carolina: Duke University Press.Internet Archive free Online.
