= Operation White Whale =

2005 international money-laundering operation

- Date: March 2005
- Venue: Near Costa del Sol, Spain
- Location: Marbella, Spain
- Type: Law enforcement operation
- Cause: International money laundering
- Motive: To disrupt and recover laundered money
- Target: Money laundering operations
- Perpetrators: Interpol, EUROPOL, Spanish authorities
- Organised by: Interpol, EUROPOL
- Participants: Spanish, French, Finnish, Russian, and Ukrainian nationals
- Outcome: Over €250 million recovered 41 arrests seizure of assets
- Arrests: 41 (initial) more later related to bribery
- Charges: Money laundering bribery
- Investigation expanded to include bribery in Marbella council

White Whale is the codename given by Interpol and EUROPOL for the international money laundering operation near Costa del Sol, Kingdom of Spain.

What began in September 2003, concluded with a massive crackdown in March 2005 near the coast of Marbella, Spain. Authorities estimate over €250 million has been recovered, and among the seized items are: 42 luxury cars, a yacht, 2 planes, paintings, and other luxury items. Spanish, French, Finnish, Russian and Ukrainian nationals were among the 41 apprehended.

In 2006 the investigation spread, to consider allegations of bribery in the Marbella council. Specifically, it appears that developers were being asked to pay for planning permission, and that permission was granted outside the remit of the local plan (e.g. residential development on non residentially zoned land). Mayor Marisol Yague, planning supremo Juan Antonio Roca, and others were arrested, including almost two thirds of councillors. Heads of construction companies and real estate agencies were also arrested.

The scale of the corruption alleged has necessitated handing over control of Marbella ayuntamiento (municipality) to a caretaker administration appointed by the Junta de Andalucia until local elections take place in 2007.

== See also ==
- Money laundering
- Organized crime
- Tax evasion
