= J. N. Reynolds =

American explorer (1799-1858)

- Born: Fall 1799; Cumberland County, Pennsylvania, U.S.
- Died: August 25, 1858; Canada
- Education: Ohio University
- Occupations: Newspaper editor; lecturer; explorer; writer; lawyer
- Known for: Advocacy of scientific expeditions
- Notable work: Address on the Subject of a Surveying and Exploring Expedition to the Pacific Ocean and the South Seas; Mocha Dick: Or the White Whale of the Pacific

J. N. Reynolds (Note: Variously referred to as Jeremiah, James, and John.) (fall 1799 – August 25, 1858), was an American newspaper editor, lecturer, explorer and writer who became an influential advocate for scientific expeditions. His lectures on the possibility of a hollow Earth appear to have influenced Edgar Allan Poe's The Narrative of Arthur Gordon Pym of Nantucket (1838), and Reynolds' 1839 account of the whale Mocha Dick, Mocha Dick: Or the White Whale of the Pacific, influenced Herman Melville's Moby-Dick (1851).

== Early life ==
Born into poverty in Cumberland County Pennsylvania, he moved to Ohio as a child. In his teenage years and early 20s, he did farm labor, taught school, saved his money, and attended Ohio University in Athens, Ohio for three years. He then edited the Spectator newspaper in Wilmington, Ohio, but sold his interest in it in about 1823.

The next year, Reynolds began a lecture tour with John Cleves Symmes Jr. Reynolds had become a convert to Symmes' theory that the earth is hollow. The two presented talks on the subject. When Symmes died, Reynolds continued his lectures, which were given to full houses in eastern U.S. cities (with a charge of 50 cents for admission).

Over time, Reynolds became willing to accept the possibility that the theory was wrong. In Philadelphia, Reynolds and Symmes parted.

== Adventures ==
Gaining the support of members of President John Quincy Adams' cabinet, and speaking before Congress, Reynolds succeeded in fitting out a national expedition to the South Pole. However, Andrew Jackson opposed the project, and after he became president it was squelched.

Reynolds garnered support from private sources, and the expedition sailed from New York City in 1829. Encountering much danger, the expedition reached the Antarctic shore and returned north, but at Valparaíso, Chile, the crew mutinied. The mutineers set Reynolds and the artist John Frampton Watson on shore, where they tramped for the next two years.

In 1832, the United States frigate Potomac, under Commodore John Downes, arrived. The ship had been ordered to the coast of Sumatra to avenge an attack on an American ship, Friendship, of Salem, Massachusetts, and was returning home in what became a circumnavigation of the globe. Reynolds joined Downes as his private secretary for the trip and wrote a book about the experience.

== Later life ==
Back in New York City, Reynolds studied law and became a success as an advocate. In 1848 he organized a stock company in New York City for a New Mexico mining operation.

Reynolds missed joining the United States Exploring Expedition of 1838–1842, even though that venture was a result of his agitation. He did not participate because he had offended too many in his call for such a trip.

His health broke down and on August 25, 1858, at the age of 59, he died suddenly while visiting St. Catharine Springs, Canada.

== Influence ==
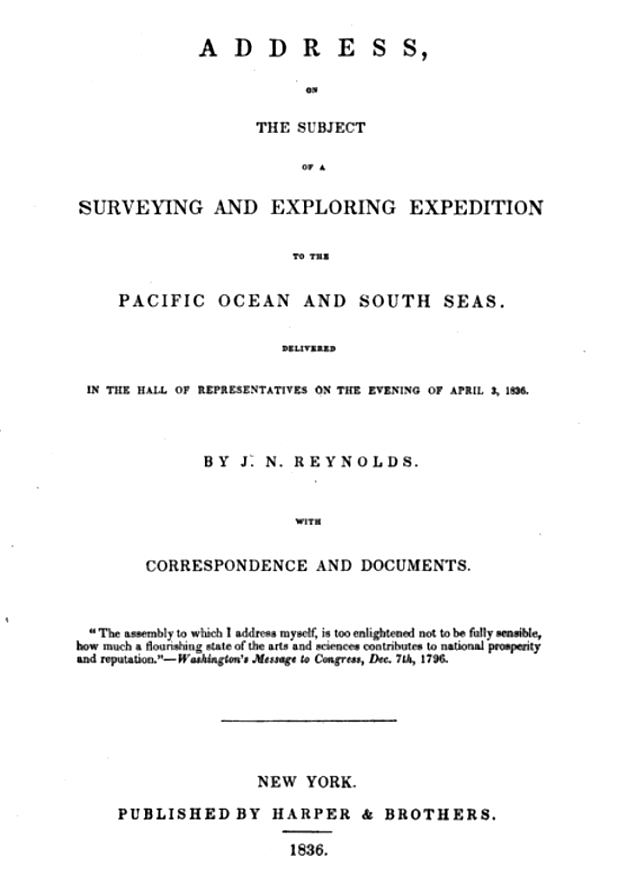
Edgar Allan Poe was influenced by "Address on the Subject of a Surveying and Exploring Expedition to the Pacific Ocean and the South Seas" (1836).

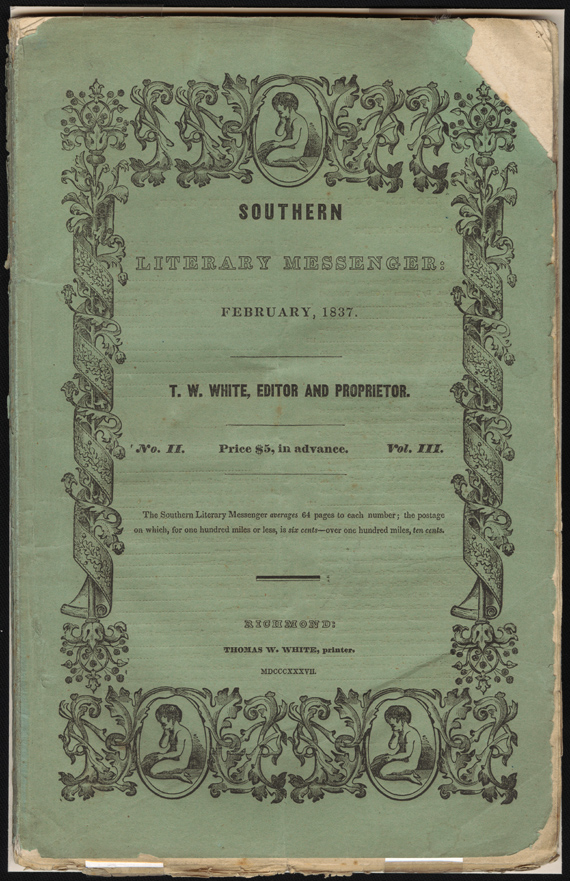
The Southern Literary Messenger, February, 1837, containing the second installment of The Narrative of Arthur Gordon Pym.

In the January 1837 issue of the Southern Literary Messenger, Edgar Allan Poe reviewed Reynolds' "Address, on the Subject of a Surveying and Exploring Expedition to the Pacific Ocean and South Seas (New York, 1836) first given to the House of Representatives on April 2, 1836".

"Poe used some seven hundred words of Reynolds' Address in the fifteen hundred words of Chapter XVI of The Narrative of Arthur Gordon Pym", wrote Daniel Tynan of the Colorado College in an article about the Poe text, adding a synopsis of "sections from Chapter IV of Reynolds' Voyage and Chapter XIV of Pym, indicating to what extent Poe borrowed from Reynolds' book for his own purposes".

Tynan's assumption, however, that the "Mr. Reynolds" Poe praised (actually not in January 1837 in the SLM but only in September 1843 in Graham's Magazine, Vol. XXIV No. 3) as "the prime mover of this important undertaking", the United States Exploring Expedition, can be identified with J. N. Reynolds seems more than doubtful.

The Knickerbocker of May 1839 published "Mocha Dick: Or the White Whale of the Pacific", Reynolds' account of Mocha Dick, a white sperm whale off Chile who bedeviled a generation of whalers for thirty years before succumbing to one.

The novel Our Plague, A Film from New York (1993) by James Chapman includes scenes of Reynolds as a character, making his way in scientific circles and delivering a lecture in New York. Reynolds also appears in Félix J. Palma's The Map of the Sky.
