= Mocha Dick =

Sperm whale that inspired the novel Moby Dick

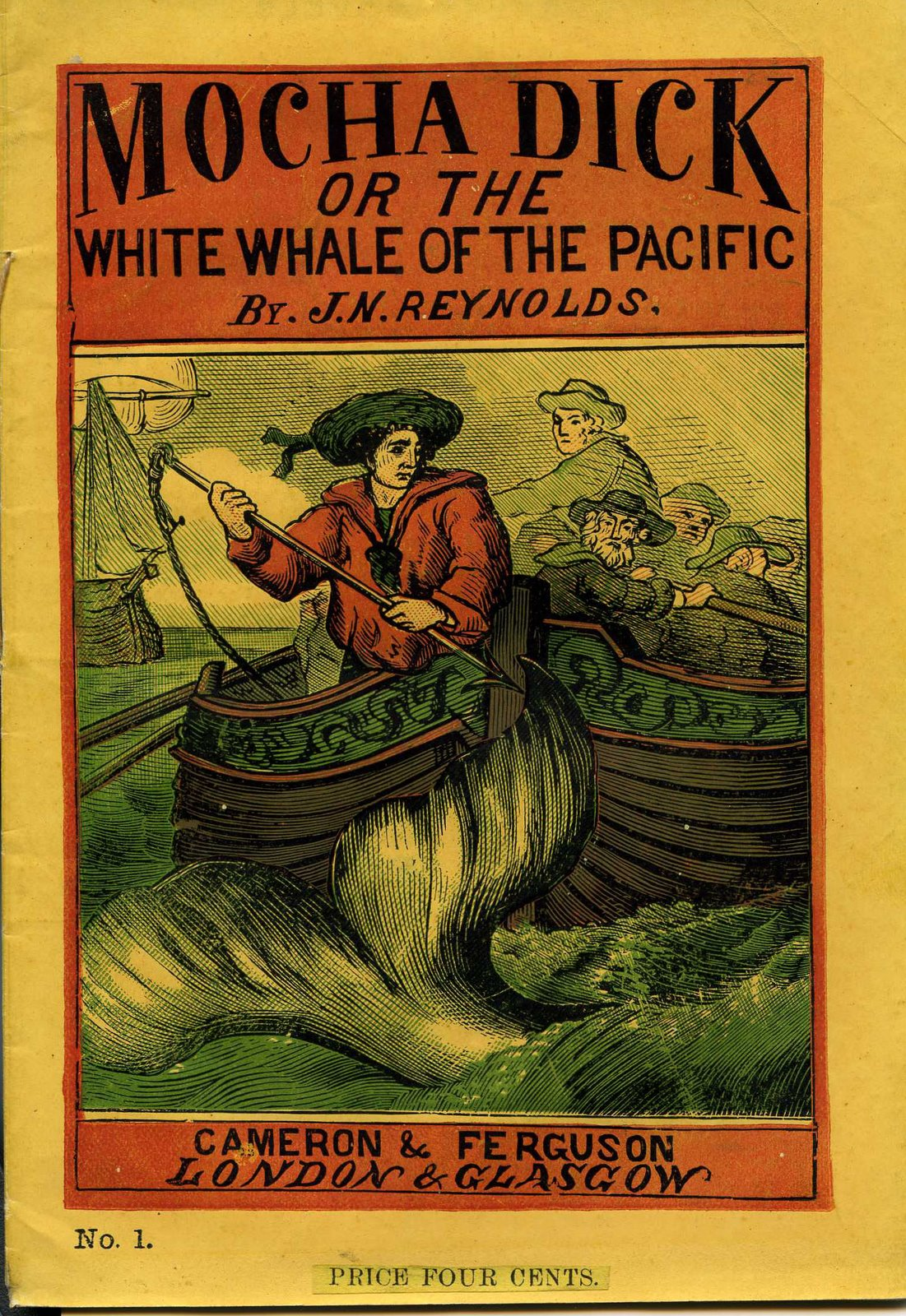
- Mocha Dick: Or The White Whale of the Pacific by Jeremiah N. Reynolds, Cameron and Ferguson, London, Glasgow. 1870.
- Other name: The White Whale
- Species: Sperm whale (Physeter macrocephalus)
- Sex: Male
- Born: Before 1800
- Died: 1838; Pacific Ocean
- Cause of death: Killed by whalers
- Years active: 1810–38
- Known for: Attacking ships
- Residence: Off Mocha Island
- Height: 21.3 m (70 ft) in length
- Named after: Mocha Island

Mocha Dick (/ˈmɒtʃə dɪk/; died 1838) was an albino (or possibly leucistic) male sperm whale (Physeter macrocephalus) that lived in the southeastern Pacific Ocean in the early 19th century, usually encountered in the waters near Mocha Island, off the central coast of Chile. American explorer and author J. N. Reynolds published an account of the whale in Mocha Dick, or The White Whale of the Pacific: A Leaf from a Manuscript Journal, printed in The Knickerbocker in 1839. Mocha Dick was part of the inspiration behind Herman Melville's novel Moby-Dick (1851).

== History ==
Mocha Dick survived many skirmishes (by Reynolds' account at least 100) with whalers before he was eventually killed. He was large and powerful, capable of wrecking small craft with his fluke. Explorer J.N. Reynolds gathered first-hand observations of Mocha Dick and published his account "Mocha Dick: Or the White Whale of the Pacific: A Leaf from a Manuscript Journal", in the May 1839 issue of The Knickerbocker. Reynolds described Mocha Dick as "an old bull whale, of prodigious size and strength... white as wool". According to Reynolds, Mocha Dick's head was covered with barnacles, which gave him a rugged appearance. The whale also had a peculiar method of spouting:

Instead of projecting his spout obliquely forward, and puffing with a short, convulsive effort, accompanied by a snorting noise, as usual with his species, Mocha Dick flung the water from his nose in a lofty, perpendicular, expanded volume, at regular and somewhat distant intervals; its expulsion producing a continuous roar, like that of vapor struggling from the safety valve of a powerful steam engine.

Mocha Dick was most likely first encountered and attacked sometime before 1810 off Mocha Island. His survival of the first encounters coupled with his unusual appearance quickly made him famous among Nantucket whalers. Many captains attempted to hunt him after rounding Cape Horn. Mocha Dick was quite docile, sometimes swimming alongside the ship, but once attacked he retaliated with ferocity and cunning, and was widely feared by harpooners. When agitated he would sound and then breach so aggressively that his entire body would sometimes come completely out of the water.

In Reynolds' account, Mocha Dick was killed in 1838, after he appeared to come to the aid of a distraught cow whose calf had just been slain by the whalers. His body was 21.3 m (70 ft) long and yielded 100 barrels of oil, along with some ambergris—a substance used in the making of perfumes and at times worth more per ounce than gold. He also had 20 harpoons in his body.

A decade later, The Knickerbocker reported another sighting of Mocha Dick in the Arctic Ocean, concluding, "Vive Mocha Dick!"

== Legacy ==
Mocha Dick was not, apparently, the only white whale in the sea. A Swedish whaler claimed to have taken a very old white whale off the coast of Brazil in 1859. In 1902, the New Bedford whaling barque Platina, captained by Thomas McKenzie, harpooned and killed an albino sperm whale near the Azores in the Atlantic Ocean, using a harpoon tipped with an explosive device. Amos Smalley harpooned the white whale and recounted his experience to Reader's Digest. He remembers Captain McKenzie estimating by the wear on the whale's teeth that it was "at least a hundred years old, maybe two hundred". Smalley was a guest at the premiere of John Huston's film Moby Dick, 1956, where he was introduced as "the man who killed Moby Dick".

In 1952, Time magazine reported the harpooning of a white whale off the coast of Peru. Since 1991, there have been sightings reported of a white humpback whale near Australia, nicknamed Migaloo. In 2012, a white humpback, nicknamed Willow the White Whale, was filmed off the coast of Norway. Sightings of white sperm whales have also been recorded off Sardinia in the Mediterranean Sea in 2006 and 2015. More recently, a white sperm whale was filmed in Caribbean waters offshore from Jamaica in 2021, by crew of a Dutch merchant ship.

Noted explorer Tim Severin wrote (in his 1999 book In Search of Moby Dick: Quest for the White Whale) of traveling about the Pacific, inquiring among indigenous fishermen and watermen about white whales, in personal experience or local folklore.

In 2010, Williams College Museum of Art presented a whale-sized work titled "Mocha Dick" — a 52 ft (16 m), ghostly white sperm whale sculptured from industrial felt, created by artist Tristin Lowe. The art show was sponsored by the Williams-Mystic Maritime Studies Program, an interdisciplinary ocean and coastal studies program created by Williams College and the Mystic Seaport maritime museum. In an interview with The Berkshire Eagle, Lowe said, "This is the archetypical whale... It's so symbolic: 'Moby Dick,' the white whale, and to have it all based on a real whale 'as white as wool,' it was all too perfect. There's a majestic quality to the whale, a calling, almost like the sea/ocean itself."

== See also ==
- List of individual cetaceans
