= Moby Dick (1956 film) =

Adventure film by John Huston

- Directed by: John Huston
- Screenplay by: Ray Bradbury; John Huston
- Based on: Moby-Dick; 1851 novel by Herman Melville
- Produced by: John Huston
- Starring: Gregory Peck; Richard Basehart; Leo Genn; Orson Welles
- Cinematography: Oswald Morris
- Edited by: Russell Lloyd
- Music by: Philip Sainton
- Production company: Moulin Productions
- Distributed by: Warner Bros.
- Release dates: June 27, 1956 (New Bedford); November 7, 1956 (London)
- Running time: 116 minutes
- Countries: United Kingdom; United States
- Language: English
- Budget: US$ 4,500,000 or £2 million
- Box office: $5.2 million (US)

Moby Dick is a 1956 adventure film directed and produced by John Huston, adapted by Huston and Ray Bradbury from Herman Melville's 1851 novel Moby-Dick. It stars Gregory Peck as Captain Ahab, Richard Basehart as Ishmael, and Leo Genn as Starbuck, with supporting performances by James Robertson Justice, Harry Andrews, Bernard Miles, Noel Purcell and Orson Welles as Father Mapple.

A co-production of the United Kingdom and the United States, the film was distributed by Warner Bros. on June 27, 1956. It received positive reviews from critics and audiences and was a commercial success. The National Board of Review ranked the film in its Top 10 Films at their 1956 awards, with Huston winning Best Director and Basehart winning for Best Supporting Actor. Huston was nominated for a Directors Guild of America Award for Outstanding Directing – Feature Film at the 9th Directors Guild of America Awards.

== Plot ==
In 1841, a sailor named Ishmael heads to the New England town of New Bedford, Massachusetts, to sign on a whaling ship. In the inn where he is staying for the night, he is forced to share his room with a Pacific Islander and harpooner named Queequeg, whom he befriends after a tense first meeting. The next morning, the two of them hire onto a whaling ship named Pequod, which is commanded by grim Captain Ahab, who is obsessed with hunting and killing a legendary white-skinned whale named Moby Dick, who was responsible for severing Ahab's left leg. Just before their departure, Ishmael and Queequeg encounter a man named Elijah, who delivers an ominous warning about Ahab and states that all but one of the crew who follow him will find their deaths on this voyage.

As the ship casts off, and for some time afterwards, Ahab remains unseen until he finally appears to align his crew to the hunt for Moby Dick and sets course for the Bikini Atoll, where the whale is said to dwell. While the crew reaps a fair bounty of oil on their journey, Ahab's obsession with Moby Dick remains foremost in his mind. When the captain of a passing ship, who recently lost his hand to the white whale, informs Ahab of Moby Dick's latest whereabouts near the coast of Madagascar, Ahab immediately breaks off a particularly successful hunt, unsettling his crew, particularly his chief mate Starbuck. Starbuck suggests to his fellow officers Stubb and Flask to wrest command of the Pequod from Ahab, which the two refuse.

As the Pequod nears the atoll, a man falls from the ship's mast into the sea and disappears. Right afterwards, the Pequod is stuck in slack water for days. Casting bones to read his future, Queequeg foresees his death and orders the ship's carpenter to make him a coffin, before he sits down to await his demise. When one of the crew prepares to cut Queequeg's skin for fun, Ishmael rises to his friend's defense, prompting Queequeg to break his death reverie and defend Ishmael. Just then, Moby Dick briefly appears before the ship and escapes before the Pequod crew can attack him.

After rowing the ship out of the becalmed area, Ahab resumes the hunt. They encounter the Rachel, another whaler from New Bedford, whose captain, Gardiner, asks Ahab to help search for his son, who was carried off by Moby Dick. Ahab refuses his aid and departs. When the Pequod hits a typhoon, Ahab uses the gale to speed the chase, endangering the ship. Starbuck decides to depose Ahab by force, but relents when in a rare humane moment Ahab reminisces about his self-destructive obsession for revenge.

Right after this conversation, a strange omen portends the fulfillment of Elijah's baleful prophecy, which Ishmael recounts to Ahab. The captain seems affected, but shakes off his doubts when Moby Dick reappears moments later. The Pequod crew sets out in their boats to bring him down. In the chaotic altercation, Moby Dick destroys Ahab's boat, but Ahab climbs onto the whale's back and stabs him until Moby Dick submerges, entangling Ahab in the harpoon lines on his back and drowning him. Instead of calling off the hunt, Starbuck orders the men to continue. Moby Dick attacks the boats, smashing them and killing the men; he then rams and sinks the Pequod before disappearing. Ishmael, the only survivor, manages to cling onto Queequeg's coffin until he is found and picked up by the Rachel.

== Cast ==
- Gregory Peck as Captain Ahab
- Richard Basehart as Ishmael
- Leo Genn as Starbuck
- Orson Welles as Father Mapple
- James Robertson Justice as Captain Boomer
- Harry Andrews as Stubb
- Friedrich von Ledebur as Queequeg
- Bernard Miles as the Manxman
- Noel Purcell as Ship's Carpenter
- Edric Connor as Daggoo
- Mervyn Johns as Peleg
- Joseph Tomelty as Peter Coffin
  - John Huston as Peter Coffin (voice, uncredited)
- Francis de Wolff as Captain Gardiner
- Philip Stainton as Bildad
- Royal Dano as Elijah
- Seamus Kelly as Flask
- Tamba Allenby as Pip
- Tom Clegg as Tashtego
- Ted Howard as Perth
- Iris Tree as Bible Woman
- A.L. Lloyd as Balladeer

== Production ==
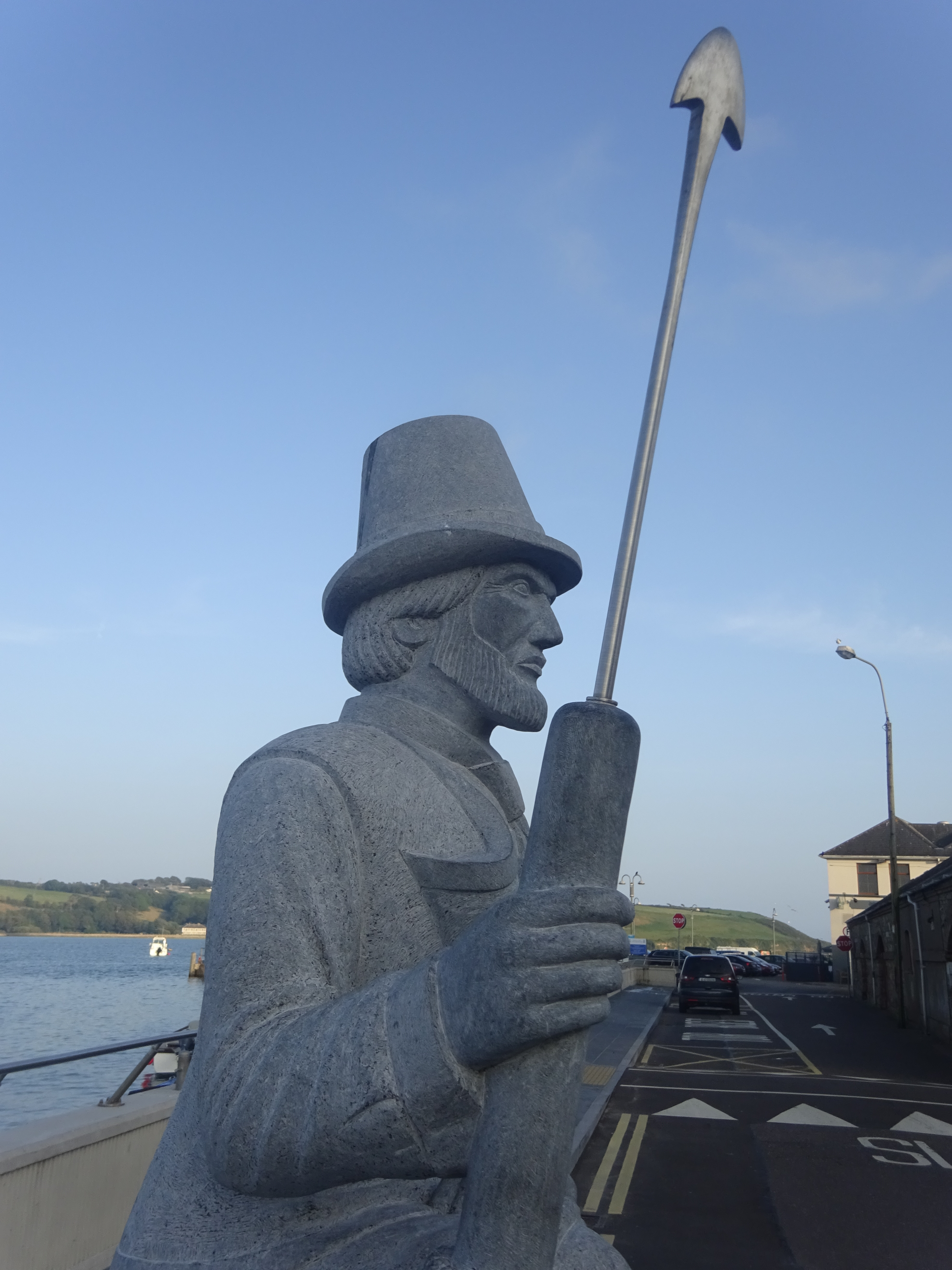
Statue of Captain Ahab in Youghal commemorating the filming of Moby Dick in the town

=== Development and writing ===
During a meeting to discuss the screenplay, Ray Bradbury informed John Huston that regarding Herman Melville's novel, he had "never been able to read the damned thing". According to the biography The Bradbury Chronicles, there was much tension and anger between the two men during the making of the film, allegedly due to Huston's bullying attitude and attempts to tell Bradbury how to do his job, despite Bradbury being an accomplished writer.

Norman Corwin did some uncredited rewrites.

The film was bankrolled by brothers Walter, Harold, and Marvin Mirisch, who financed Huston's Moulin Rouge. The Mirisches made a deal with Warner Bros. Pictures in order to release the film. Under the agreement, WB would distribute Moby Dick for seven years, after which all rights would revert to the Mirisch brothers' company, Moulin Productions.

=== Casting ===
Gregory Peck was initially surprised to be cast as Ahab (part of the studio's agreement to fund the film was that Huston use a "name" actor as Ahab). Peck later commented that he felt Huston himself should have played Ahab. Huston had long wanted to make a film of Moby-Dick, and had intended to cast his own father, actor Walter Huston as Ahab, but he had died in 1950. Peck went on to play the role of Father Mapple in the 1998 television miniseries adaptation of Melville's novel, with Patrick Stewart as Ahab. Peck, comparing his performances in this film and the 1998 Moby Dick miniseries, said he liked the miniseries better because it was more faithful to the novel and had a greater sense of adventure.

Peck and Huston intended to shoot Herman Melville's Typee in 1957, but the funding fell through. Not long after, the two had a falling-out. According to one biography, Peck discovered to his disappointment that he had not been Huston's choice for Ahab, but in fact was thrust upon the director by the Mirisch brothers to secure financing. Peck felt Huston had deceived him into taking a part for which Peck felt he was ill-suited. Years later, the actor tried to patch up his differences with the director, but Huston, quoted in Lawrence Grobel's biography The Hustons, rebuked Peck ("It was too late to start over", said Huston) and the two never spoke to each other again. Nevertheless, Huston's daughter Anjelica confirmed in a 2003 Larry King Live interview that her father had "adored" Peck.

At the age of four, Anjelica Huston met Peck dressed as Ahab when she visited the set of her father's film. Decades later, she and Peck would meet again and become close friends until the latter's death.

Orson Welles later used the salary from his appearance to fund his own stage production, Moby Dick—Rehearsed, in which Rod Steiger played Captain Ahab.

Friedrich von Ledebur wore skintight prosthetics made by a local nylon factory for Queequeg's tattoos.

Folk singer A.L. Lloyd makes a cameo appearance, singing a sea shanty in the inn before Ishmael (Richard Basehart) signs aboard the Pequod.

=== Filming ===
The film began shooting in Wales at Fishguard and Ceibwr Bay, Fishguard at Huston's request. Parts of the movie were shot at the sea in front of Caniçal, a traditional whaling parish in Madeira Islands, Portugal, with real action of whaling done by whalers of Madeira Island. It was also filmed in Las Canteras beach, Las Palmas de Gran Canaria, Canary Islands, Spain. Captain Alan Villiers commanded the ship for the film.

Many exterior scenes set in New Bedford were shot on location in Youghal, Co. Cork, Ireland. Reportedly in search of "a port that hadn't changed in a hundred years", Huston chose the town from a shortlist that included Wicklow, Arklow, and Kinsale. The local government made Huston a freeman of Youghal in thanks. The town's harbor basin stood in for New Bedford's harbor. Production required local craftsmen to dredge the harbor by hand, erect facades over coastal buildings to resemble 1800s New Bedford, and dress telephone poles with canvas to appear as ships' masts. Nearly twenty-thousand people descended on Youghal to watch filming during the summer of 1954, with female extras playing the crew's wives and daughters who wave to the departing ship. The production brought in male extras from Cork, as Youghal did not have enough bearded men.

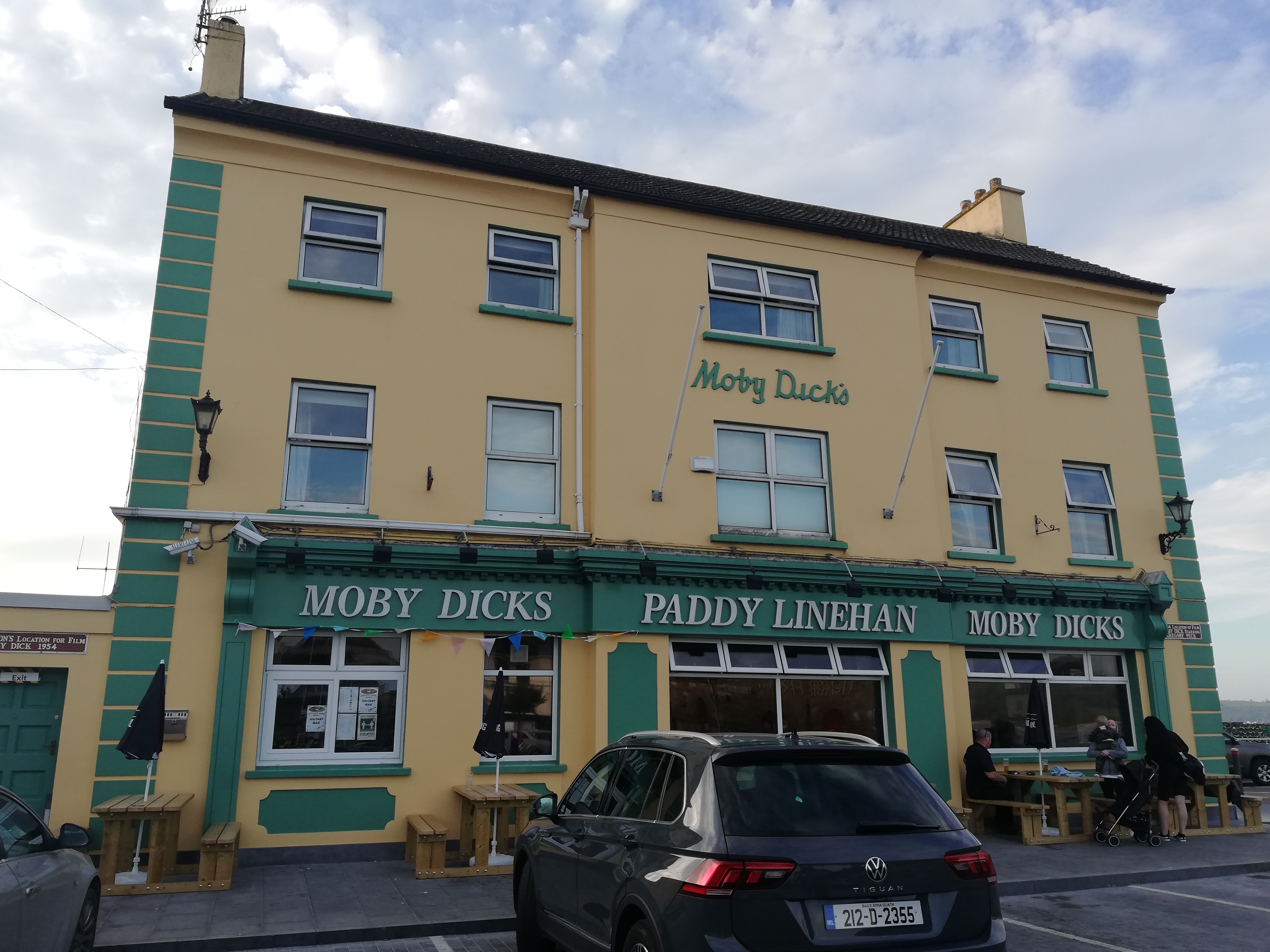
Paddy Linehan's pub, Youghal, which was renamed "Moby Dick's" after appearing in the film

The town has a public house, originally called Linehan's, whose exterior appears in the movie. It was renamed Moby Dick's shortly after filming by Linehan. It is still owned and run by the Linehan family and boasts a fine collection of photographs taken of the cast and crew during the making of the film. Peck donated to the bar his prop whalebone leg, which remains on display. While there, John Huston used the bar as his headquarters to plan each day's filming; the cast and crew likewise frequented it at night. Youghal's nineteenth century lighthouse also appears in a scene of the Pequod putting to sea (at sunset) on her fateful voyage.

In order to create a visual effect reminiscent of old whaling prints, a black and white print was superimposed on a color print. The resulting effect was similar to a bleach bypass.

The film went overbudget, from $2 million to around $4.4 million, which crippled Moulin Productions; Moby Dick was ultimately sold to United Artists in order to recoup some of the Mirisch brothers' debt (Warner Bros. still distributed the film, corresponding to their original licensing agreement; when the agreement ended, United Artists took over the film's distribution rights. After UA was acquired by MGM in 1981, the latter studio assumed distribution and holds the film's copyright). Moby Dick did not recoup its budget upon its initial release.

=== Special effects ===
A myth that was put to rest in cinematographer Oswald Morris' autobiography, Huston, We Have a Problem, is that no full-length whale models were ever built for the production. Previous accounts have claimed that as many as three 60-foot rubber "white whales" were lost at sea during filming, making them "navigational hazards". In fact the titular whale shown in the film was constructed by Dunlop in Stoke-on-Trent, England. Moby Dick was 75 ft long and weighed 12 tons, and required 80 drums of compressed air and a hydraulic system in order to remain afloat and operational. However the artificial whale came loose from its tow-line and drifted away in a fog. Peck confirmed in 1995 that he was aboard the prop. According to Morris, after the prop was lost the Pequod was followed by a barge with various whale parts (hump, back, fin, tail). Ninety percent of the shots of the white whale are various size miniatures filmed in a water tank in Shepperton Studios in Surrey, near London. Whales and longboat models were built by a special effects man, August Lohman, working in conjunction with art director Stephen Grimes. Studio shots also included a life-size Moby jaw and head - with working eyes. The head apparatus which could move like a rocking horse was employed when actors were in the water with the whale. Gregory Peck's last speech is delivered in the studio while riding the white whale's hump (a hole was drilled in the side of the whale so Peck could conceal his real leg).

=== Ships ===
The Pequod was portrayed by, appropriately, the Moby Dick. Built in England in 1887 as the Ryelands, the ship came into the hands of the film industry in the 50s, and was also used in Treasure Island. It was destroyed by fire in Morecambe, England, in 1970. The schooners used were Harvest King and James Postlethwaite, both from Arklow, Ireland.

In the documentary accompanying the DVD marking the 30th anniversary of the film Jaws, director Steven Spielberg states his original intention had been to introduce the Ahab-like character Quint (Robert Shaw), by showing him watching the 1956 version of the film and laughing at the inaccuracies therein. However, permission to use footage of the original film was denied by Gregory Peck as he was uncomfortable with his performance.

== Release ==
The film premiered in New Bedford, Massachusetts on June 27, 1956. A UK premiere took place in London on November 7, followed by a general release in January the following year.

== Reception ==
According to Kinematograph Weekly the film was "in the money" at the British box office in 1957.

=== Critical response ===
Bosley Crowther of The New York Times called Moby Dick "a rolling and thundering color film that is herewith devoutly recommended as one of the great motion pictures of our times ... Space does not possibly permit us to cite all the things about this film that are brilliantly done or developed, from the strange, subdued color scheme employed to the uncommon faithfulness to details of whaling that are observed."

Time praised the film and the cast, but felt that Gregory Peck was miscast: "What emerges is a brilliant film both for Melville enthusiasts and for those who have tried to read the book and lost their way. The most difficult role, Ahab, is unfortunately handed to the actor probably least able to cope with it ... But his failure is only a measure of the high success of the rest of the cast."

Variety wrote: "Essentially it is a 'chase' picture with all the inherent interest thereby implied and yet not escaping the quality of sameness and repetition which often dulls the chase formula." The review also found that "Peck often seems understated and much too gentlemanly for a man supposedly consumed by insane fury."

Edwin Schallert of The Los Angeles Times found the film to be "something less than really great," although it "has great moments, and is amazingly individual in its art, various phases of its drama, and notably in characters."

Richard L. Coe of The Washington Post called the film "one of the rare ones, the sort of picture people will remember and rank as one of the screen's classics ... Not only is the film immensely exciting in purely screen terms, it is a haunting philosophical study."

Harrison's Reports praised the "excellence of the production values" but noted, "It is not until the last few reels, where a violent battle to the death takes place between the whale and the crew, that the action becomes highly exciting. This fierce combat with the whale has been staged in thrilling fashion and is the highlight of the film, but it is not enough to compensate for the lack of excitement in the preceding reels."

John McCarten of The New Yorker called Moby Dick "a fine, big, elementary job that misses the mystical Melville by several nautical miles but affords us an almost completely satisfactory tour of the bounding main."

The Monthly Film Bulletin wrote: "The physical excitements of the adventure story which is the superstructure of Melville's book are all admirably done. Where Huston has failed is in suggesting the mysticism of the book and the ominous influence of Moby Dick himself. The great white whale is no 'portentous and mysterious monster ... the gliding great demon of the seas of life'; he is often, only too clearly made of plastic and electronically controlled. Without this presence and motivation much of the story loses its significance."

TimeOut said: "[T]he great white whale is significantly less impressive when lifting bodily out of the sea to crush the Pequod than when first glimpsed one moonlit night ... a pitifully weak Starbuck. But there are marvelous things here ... [such as] nearly all the whaling scenes. Lent a stout overall unity by ... the intelligent adaptation (and) by color grading which gives the images the tonal quality of old whaling prints..it is often staggeringly good."

The film has an 81% rating on Rotten Tomatoes, with the consensus that "It may favor spectacle in place of the deeper themes in Herman Melville's novel, but John Huston's Moby Dick still makes for a grand movie adventure."

== Comic-book adaptation ==
- Dell Four Color #717 (August 1956)

== Home media ==
Despite being a Warner Bros. film, United Artists released Moby Dick in VHS format through MGM on November 12, 1996, as part of the MGM's Vintage Classics lineup, which was available exclusively through Warner Home Video worldwide. Kino Lorber released a DVD version on September 15, 2015. A limited-edition Blu-ray version was released on November 15, 2016, by Twilight Time, and the film has also been released in Blu-ray format in Spain.

== See also ==
- List of American films of 1956
