= Mayrisch =

Mayrisch is a surname. Notable people with the surname include:

- Aline Mayrisch de Saint-Hubert (1874–1947), Luxembourgian women's rights campaigner, socialite, philanthropist
- Émile Mayrisch (1862–1928), Luxembourgian industrialist and businessman
- Lycée Aline Mayrisch, high school in Luxembourg City, in southern Luxembourg
- Stade Émile Mayrisch, football and athletics stadium, in Esch-sur-Alzette, in south-western Luxembourg

== See also ==
- Mayres (disambiguation)
- Mirisch
- Myrice, a genus of moths in the family Geometridae
