= Mirisch =

Mirisch or Mirić is a Jewish surname of Sephardic origin. The family (Rabbi David Marich merchant and doctor and Don Abraham Marich merchant) is attested in Ferrara following the Expulsion of 1492. Following the immigration of Sephardic Jews to the wider Balkan area the Marich settle in Banja Luka and later move to Sarajevo. Following the Ottoman rule family members immigrate further East into Serbia (where they locally adapt their name to Mirić whose local significance happens to mean 'peace') and further North into Poland where hundreds of Mirisch will die during the holocaust.

Notable people with the surname include:

- Harold Mirisch (1907–1968)
- Marvin Mirisch (1918–2002)
- Walter Mirisch (1921–2023), American film producer

== See also ==
- Mirisch Company, a motion picture production company
- Mirisch Films
- Mirischia
