= 1836 Massachusetts legislature =

57th Massachusetts General Court

57th Massachusetts General Court
←	56th	58th	→

Overview
- Legislative body: General Court
- Term: 1836 –

Senate
- Members: 40
- President: Horace Mann

House
- Members: 619
- Speaker: Julius Rockwell

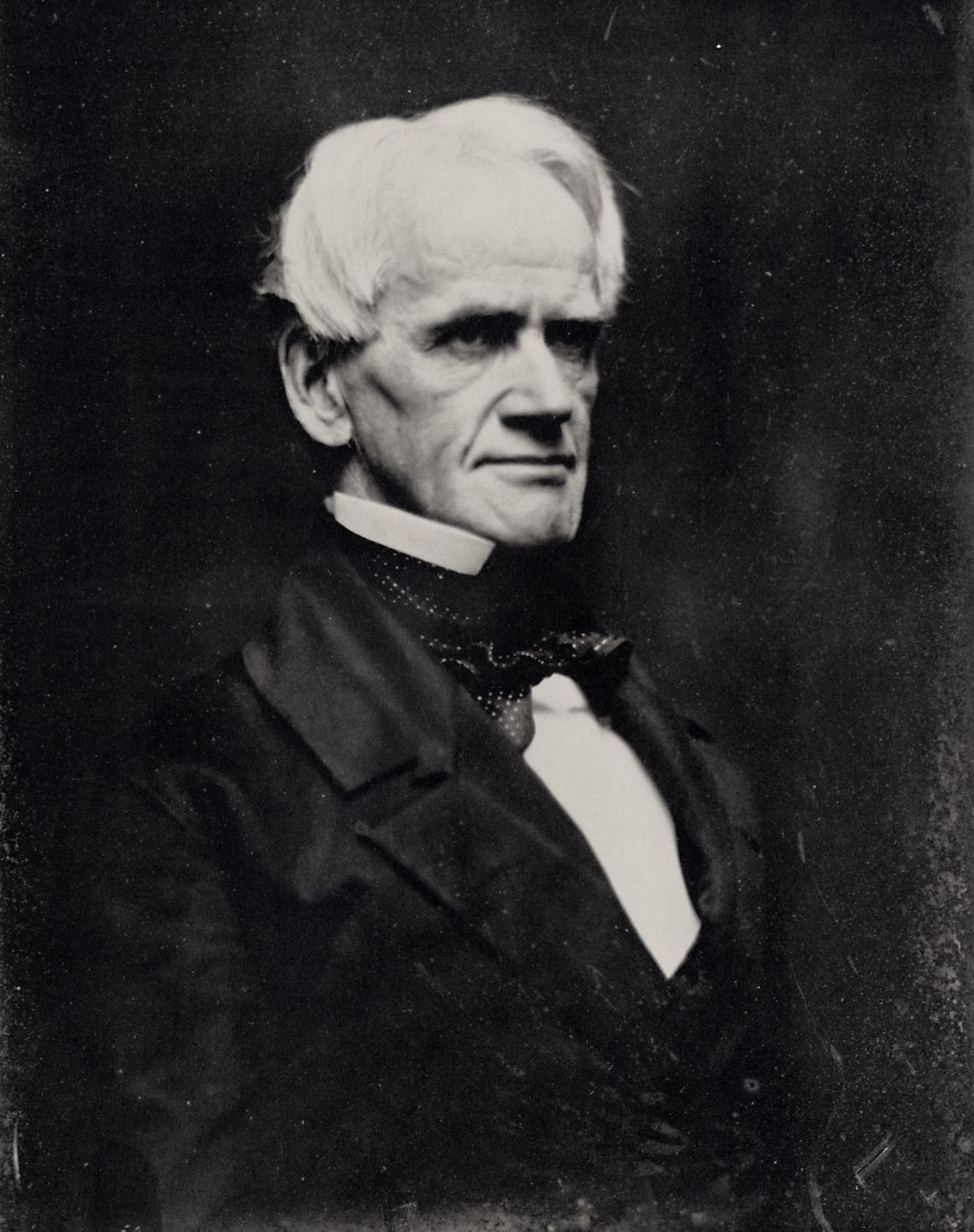
Horace Mann, Senate president.

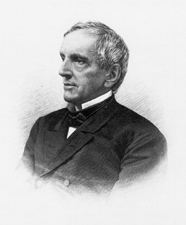
Julius Rockwell, House speaker.

Leaders of the Massachusetts General Court, 1836.

The 57th Massachusetts General Court, consisting of the Massachusetts Senate and the Massachusetts House of Representatives, met in 1836 during the governorship of Edward Everett. Horace Mann served as president of the Senate and Julius Rockwell served as speaker of the House.

== Senators ==
- Charles Allen
- Reuben Bacon
- Ebenezer Blake
- Russell Brown
- Harvey Chapin
- Linus Child
- Abel Cushing
- Stephen Fairbanks
- Joseph Fitch
- Waldo Flint
- John C. Gray
- Ethan A. Greenwood
- Nathan Gurney
- James H. Hardy
- Ephraim Hastings
- Charles Hudson
- Charles Kimball
- Abel Kingman
- Joseph Kittredge
- Myron Lawrence
- William Livingston
- George Lunt
- Horace Mann
- Charles Marston
- Leonard M. Parker
- William Parmenter
- Stephen Pope
- Charles Russell
- Orren Sage
- Jonathan Shove
- Phineas Sprague
- William Sturgis
- John Tenney
- Leavitt Thaxter
- John B. Turner
- William Ward
- Stephen P. Webb
- Seth Whitmarsh
- Benjamin P. Williams
- Henry Williams

== See also ==
- 24th United States Congress
- List of Massachusetts General Courts
