= Sharona Nazarian =

American politician and psychologist

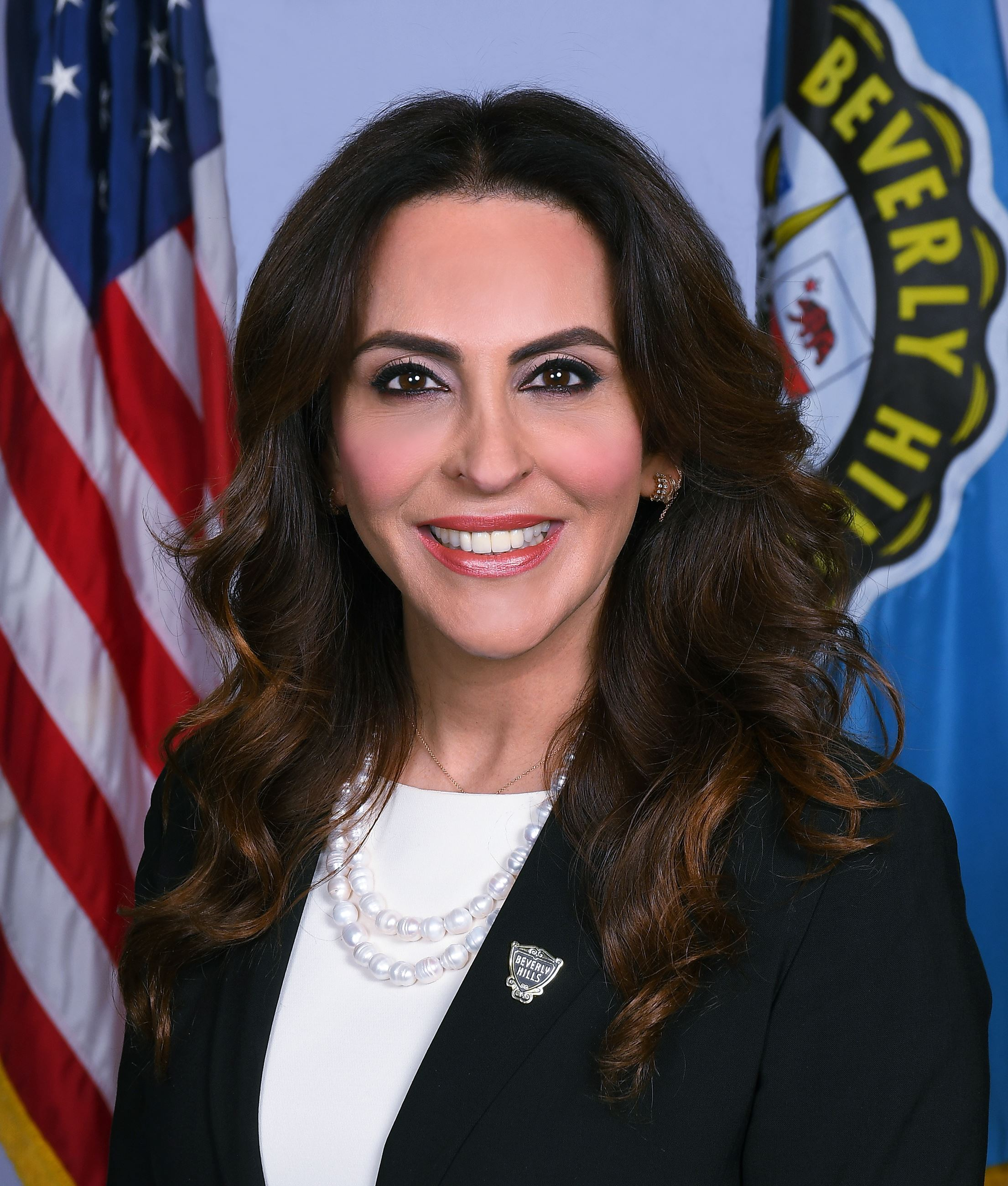

85th Mayor of Beverly Hills
- In office April 1st, 2025 – 2026
- Preceded by: Lester Friedman
- Succeeded by: Craig A. Corman

Member of the Beverly Hills City Council
- Incumbent
- Assumed office June 2022

Vice Mayor of Beverly Hills
- In office 2024–2025

Personal details
- Born: 1974 (age 51–52) Iran
- Party: Democratic
- Spouse: Daniel Nazarian
- Children: 3
- Education: University of Southern California (B.A.); Alliant International University (PsyD)
- Profession: Politician

Sharona Nazarian (born 1974) is an Iranian-American politician and psychologist who served as the mayor of Beverly Hills from 2025 to 2026. A member of the Democratic Party, she has previously served as the vice mayor of Beverly Hills from 2024 to 2025 and has been a member of the Beverly Hills City Council since 2022.

== Early life and education ==
Sharona Nazarian was born in Iran to a Jewish family. After the Iranian Revolution, her family had to flee Iran due to religious persecution. Alongside her mother and younger brother, the family initially settled in Israel before moving to the United States, where she would reunite with her father.

Nazarian completed a double major in psychology and sociology from the University of Southern California and a doctorate of psychology from Alliant International University.

Before joining the Beverly Hills City Council, Nazarian worked as a clinical psychologist and served as vice president of Beit Halochem USA

== Political career ==
Nazarian was first elected to the Beverly Hills City Council in 2022. She served as vice mayor of Beverly Hills from 2024 to 2025 before becoming mayor of Beverly Hills in 2025.

She was the first Iranian-American woman to serve as the mayor of Beverly Hills and the second Jewish Iranian-American mayor of Beverly Hills after Jimmy Delshad.

== Personal life ==
Sharona Nazarian is married to Daniel Nazarian and has three sons.
