= 1837 Massachusetts legislature =

American state legislature

58th Massachusetts General Court
←	57th	59th	→

Overview
- Legislative body: General Court
- Term: 1837 –

Senate
- Members: 40
- President: Horace Mann

House
- Members: 635
- Speaker: Julius Rockwell

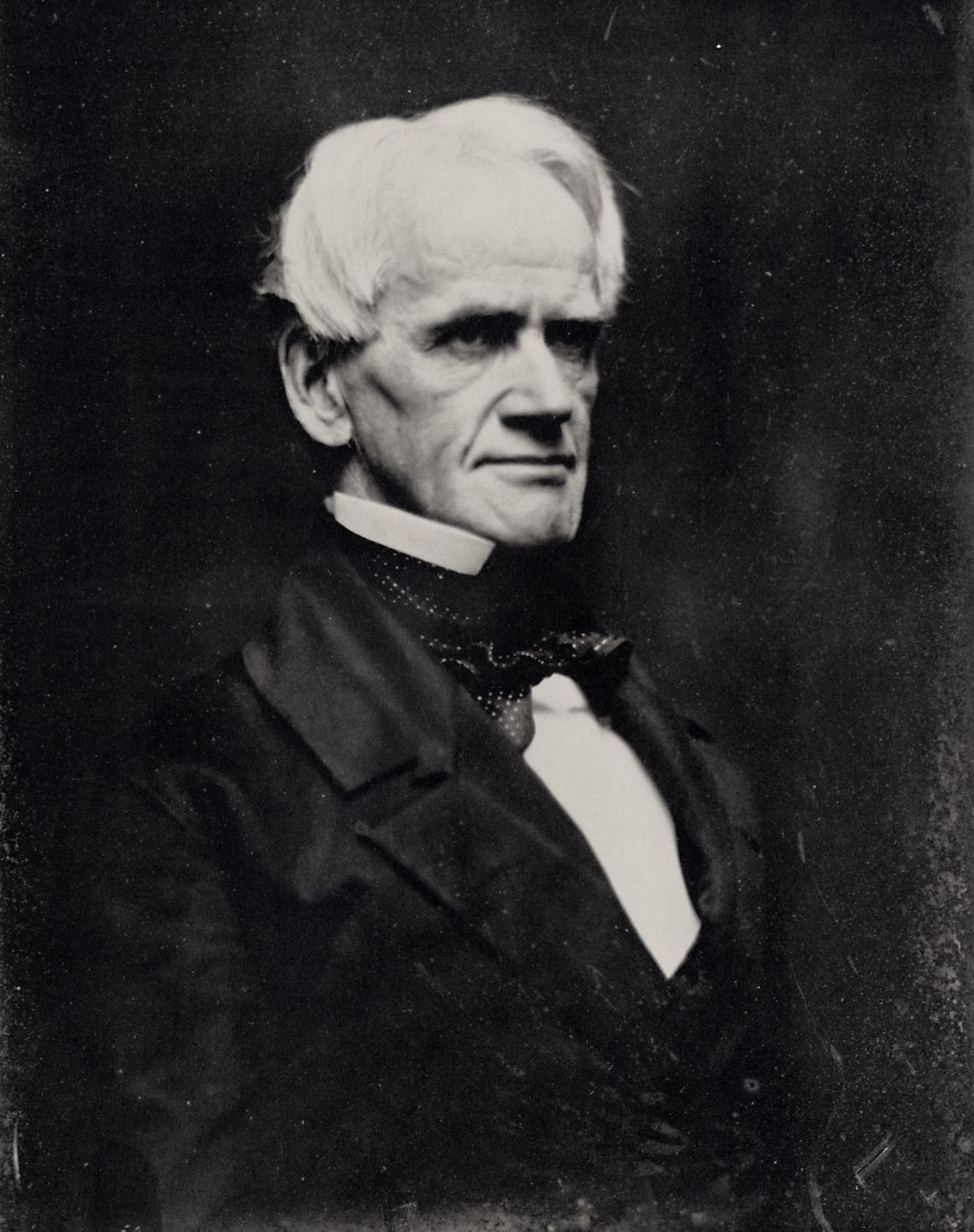
Horace Mann, Senate president.

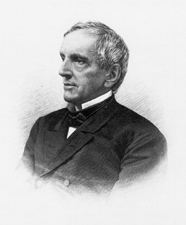
Julius Rockwell, House speaker.

Leaders of the Massachusetts General Court, 1837.

The 58th Massachusetts General Court, consisting of the Massachusetts Senate and the Massachusetts House of Representatives, met in 1837 during the governorship of Edward Everett. Horace Mann served as president of the Senate and Julius Rockwell served as speaker of the House.

== Historical context ==
The 58th Massachusetts General Court convened during a pivotal year in the history of American public education. Governor Edward Everett, serving his third term, worked alongside the legislature to establish the [[Massachusetts State Board of Education]] — one of the first such bodies in the United States. The legislation creating the Board was championed by Senate president Horace Mann, who was subsequently appointed as its first secretary — a role in which he served for twelve years and fundamentally transformed public schooling in the United States.

== Senate president: Horace Mann ==
Horace Mann (1796–1859), who presided over the Senate during this session, is widely regarded as the "father of American public education." He had previously served in the Massachusetts House of Representatives (1827–1833) before winning election to the Senate in 1835 and being named its president the following year. During his legislative years he also championed the construction of railroads and canals, and secured the establishment of a state asylum for the insane in Worcester. Mann resigned from the Senate presidency upon accepting the secretariat of the new Board of Education, marking a decisive shift in his career from legislator to educator.

== Governor: Edward Everett ==
Edward Everett (1794–1865), under whose governorship the 58th General Court sat, was a Whig politician, scholar, and orator who ultimately served four consecutive terms as governor until 1840. A Harvard-educated classicist, Everett was renowned as one of the greatest orators of the era — today most remembered for the two-hour speech he delivered at Gettysburg on the same platform as President Abraham Lincoln's far shorter address in 1863.

== Senators ==
- Daniel Adams III
- Charles Allen
- Reuben Bacon
- Francis Bowman
- Harvey Chapin
- Linus Child
- Henry H. Childs
- Abel Cushing
- Samuel Dorr
- Stephen Fairbanks
- Joseph Fitch
- Thomas French
- Ethan A. Greenwood
- Nathan Gurney
- William Hancock
- James H. Handy
- Ephraim Hastings
- Charles Hudson
- David Joy
- Charles Kimball
- Abel Kingman
- Myron Lawrence
- William Livingston
- Horace Mann
- Charles Marston
- Stephen Oliver
- Warwick Palfray Jr.
- Leonard M. Parker
- Stephen Pope
- Josiah Quincy Jr.
- Charles Russell
- Orren Sage
- Jonathan Shove
- Phineas Sprague
- John Tenney
- John B. Turner
- William Ward
- Seth Whitmarsh
- Benjamin P. Williams
- Henry Williams

== See also ==
- 25th United States Congress
- List of Massachusetts General Courts
