= Mayre =

Mayre or Mayré may refer to:

- 3870 Mayré, a main-belt asteroid, named after the discoverer's daughter
- Mayre Griffiths (Trot) name of a fictional character in the works of L. Frank Baum and later writers of Oz books.
- Mayré Martínez, Venezuelan pop singer

== See also ==
- Mayres (disambiguation)
