= Nancy Krasne =

American politician and philanthropist

73rd Mayor of Beverly Hills
- In office 2009–2010
- Preceded by: Barry Brucker
- Succeeded by: Jimmy Delshad

Personal details
- Spouse: James L. Krasne
- Children: 2
- Education: University of California, Los Angeles
- Profession: Politician, philanthropist

Nancy Krasne is an American politician and philanthropist. She served as the mayor of Beverly Hills, California from 2009 to 2010.

== Biography ==
=== Early life ===
She grew up in Los Angeles, California and paid for her own education by working as a sales girl at Fedway in Westwood and at J. W. Robinson's, and as an operator at the Telephone Company. She graduated from the University High School and the University of California, Los Angeles.

=== Career ===
She worked as an elementary school teacher in the Los Angeles Unified School District for eighteen years. She served on the Beverly Hills Planning Commission from 2003 to 2007, on the Beverly Hills City Council from 2007 to 2009, and as Mayor from 2009 to 2010. In 2013, she was elected to the Beverly Hills City Council again.

=== Philanthropy ===
She has served on the Boards of Trustees of the Friends of Greystone, the National Council of Jewish Women and the Los Angeles Child Guidance Clinic. She was a member of Los Angeles County Museum of Art Costume Council. She also volunteers for The Salvation Army and The City of Hope. She collects Japanese art.

=== Personal life ===
She married James L. Krasne in 1966, and they have two sons, Kevin and David. They reside in Beverly Hills.

Political offices
Preceded by Barry Brucker	Mayor of Beverly Hills, California; 2009-2010	Succeeded by Jimmy Delshad
