= John A. Mirisch =

American politician (born 1963)

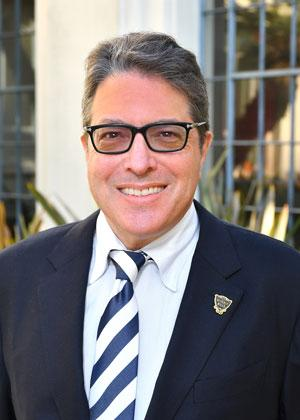

73rd, 76th, and 79th Mayor of Beverly Hills
- In office March 27, 2013 – February 25, 2014
- Preceded by: William W. Brien
- Succeeded by: Lili Bosse
- In office March 2016 – March 28, 2017
- Preceded by: Julian Gold
- Succeeded by: Lili Bosse
- In office March 20, 2019 – March 31, 2020
- Preceded by: Julian Gold
- Succeeded by: Lester Friedman

Personal details
- Born: February 15, 1963 (age 63)
- Party: Republican
- Relations: Harold Mirisch (grandfather); Walter Mirisch (half-great-uncle); Marvin Mirisch (half-great-uncle)
- Children: 2
- Profession: Politician

John A. Mirisch (born February 15, 1963 in Los Angeles, California) is an American politician and former film studio executive. He is currently a city council member of Beverly Hills, California. He also served as mayor from 2013 to 2014, from 2016 to 2017, and from 2019 to 2020.

== Early life ==
John A. Mirisch was born to a prominent family in Beverly Hills. He has a brother and a step-sister, the daughter of his mother's second husband Leonard Goldberg. His grandfather, Harold Mirisch, alongside his great-uncles Walter Mirisch (1921–2023) and Marvin Mirisch (1918–2002), founded the Mirisch Company in 1957. He attended Hawthorne Elementary and Beverly Hills High School, graduating in 1981. He graduated from Yale University magna cum laude in 1985.

== Career ==
Mirisch began his career at 20th Century Fox. He later worked as managing director of the Austrian office of United International Pictures, following by the Swedish office. He served on the boards of the Austrian and Swedish Film Distributors' Associations and the Swedish Academy Awards Selection Committee. He worked as an executive both at IMAX and at Paramount Pictures.

Mirisch was elected to the Beverly Hills City Council in 2009. As councilor, he opposed plans to annex Holmby Hills, Los Angeles as part of the city of Beverly Hills. He served as vice mayor of Beverly Hills in 2012, and became mayor for the first time in 2013. His first term ended in March 2014, when Lili Bosse was sworn in as mayor.

Mirisch served his second term as mayor from March 2016 to March 2017 and began his third term as mayor in March 2019.

In June 2019, Mirisch supported a ban on the sale of tobacco products in the city.

Mirisch was re-elected to an unprecedented fourth term in 2022.

In August 2023, Mirisch asked the city council to probe Hamad bin Jassim bin Jaber Al Thani, the former Qatari prime minister and owner of the Maybourne Beverly Hills hotel, citing allegations of terrorism enablement. In 2025, Mirisch participated in protests in front of the hotel that raised concerns of Qatari support for Hamas.

In April 2025, Mirisch was sworn in as the vice mayor of Beverly Hills. In August 2025, Mirisch supported an effort to fly the flag of Israel inside of all Beverly Hills public school campuses and facilities.

=== Actions on housing ===
Mirisch opposes increases in housing supply in Beverly Hills and has criticized YIMBY activists who he says wants the "elimination of single-family neighborhoods." He has said that Beverly Hills's character is "low-rise and human-scale" and that "Beverly Hills is not Manhattan."

In 2016, he opposed the construction of a 375-foot apartment building next to the Beverly Hilton Hotel. In 2021, he opposed a $2-billion project that entailed the construction of two apartment buildings next to the Beverly Hilton and Waldorf Astoria hotels, a hotel with 42 suites and 37 branded residences, and 35,000 square feet devoted to retail and restaurants, and which was estimated to contribute $1.7 billion in tax revenue. In 2023, he opposed the construction of a luxury hotel on Rodeo Drive that was estimated to contribute $725 million in tax revenue to Beverly Hills.

=== Lawsuit against Beverly Hills ===
In January 2026, Mirisch filed a lawsuit against the city of Beverly Hills, alleging that the city is blocking him from running for a fifth term on the city council.

== Personal life ==
Mirisch has two sons. He is a member of the Geelong Football Club of the Australian Football League. He is a dual Swedish-American citizen and also a citizen of Canada.

In 2016, the city of Beverly Hills was ordered to pay $9,357 in legal fees to a journalist who filed suit for release of police records related to alleged domestic abuse by Mirisch. The records included incident reports from police visits to Mirisch's home. An affidavit filed by Magdalena Mirisch for a restraining order during divorce proceedings in 2011 claimed that Mirisch emotionally abused her and was neglectful toward their son.

Political offices
Preceded by William W. Brien	Mayor of Beverly Hills, California; 2013–2014	Succeeded by Lili Bosse
Preceded by Julian Gold	Mayor of Beverly Hills, California; 2016–2017	Succeeded by Lili Bosse
