= Barry Brucker =

American businessman and politician

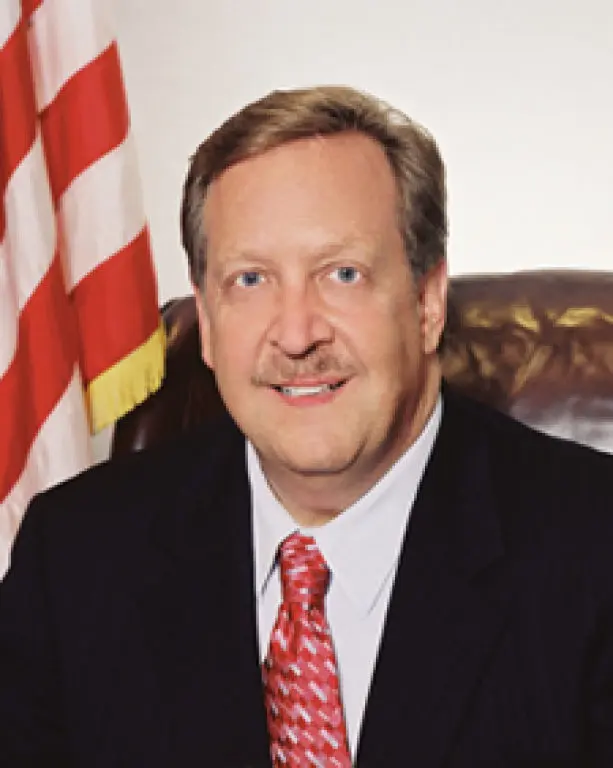

66th Mayor of Beverly Hills
- In office March 2008 – March 2009
- Preceded by: Jimmy Delshad
- Succeeded by: Nancy Krasne

71st Mayor of Beverly Hills
- In office March 2011 – March 2012
- Preceded by: Jimmy Delshad
- Succeeded by: William W. Brien

Personal details
- Spouse: Sue Brucker

Barry Brucker is an American businessman and politician. He served twice as the Mayor of Beverly Hills, California.

== Early life ==
Barry Brucker grew up in Beverly Hills. He attended Beverly Vista School and graduated from Beverly Hills High School in 1975. He then received a Bachelor of Arts with honors in Business and Economics from the University of California, Santa Barbara. He is a member of Omicron Delta Epsilon.

== Career ==
He serves as President and Chief Executive Officer of Independent Ink, a global manufacturer of printer ink.

In 1997, he was elected to the Beverly Hills Unified School District Board of Education and he was reelected in 2001, serving two terms as school board president, in 1999 and 2003. In 2005, he was elected to the Beverly Hills City Council, and again in 2009. He served as Vice-Mayor in 2009 and 2010. He was elected as Mayor in 2008, and was reelected in 2011.

He serves as Vice President of the Beverly Hills Education Foundation. Previously, he served on the Board of Governors of Century City Hospital. He now serves on the Board of Directors of Friends of Sheba Hospital in Israel.

After eight years on the city council and two terms as Mayor, Brucker decided to retire in 2013.

== Personal life ==
Brucker holds a black belt in karate. He is married to Sue Brucker, and they have two children, Richard and Lauren. He is Jewish, and he volunteers at Temple Emanuel of Beverly Hills.
