= William W. Brien =

American physician

William Warren Brien

72nd Mayor of Beverly Hills
- In office March 2012 – 2013
- Preceded by: Barry Brucker
- Succeeded by: John A. Mirisch

Personal details
- Born: November 30, 1957 (age 68)
- Party: Democratic
- Spouse: Connie Agnew
- Relations: Earl Warren (grandfather)
- Children: Willie Jr., Brent, Kelly and Ashley
- Education: University of Southern California; UCLA School of Medicine
- Profession: Orthopedic surgeon

William "Willie" Warren Brien (born November 30, 1957) is an American politician who was the Chief Medical Officer and Chief Quality Officer of University Hospitals in Cleveland, Ohio. Previously, he was the Executive Vice Chairman of the Department of Surgery, Director of the Cedars-Sinai Orthopaedic Center and also served as the Chief of Staff at Cedars-Sinai Medical Center. He was elected as a Council Member of the City of Beverly Hills in 2009 and became Mayor of Beverly Hills in March, 2012.

== Biography ==
He was elected to the Beverly Hills City Council in 2009. Prior to being elected to the council, he served on the Recreation and Parks Commission and the Beverly Hills Board of Education.

Brien received his medical degree from the University of California, Los Angeles and completed his residency in orthopaedic surgery at the Los Angeles County/USC School of Medicine. A lifelong Beverly Hills resident, Brien joined the Cedars-Sinai medical team in 1991. He currently serves on the California Health Policy and Data Advisory Commission and the California Orthopaedic Association Board of Directors and is a fellow of the American Academy of Orthopedic Surgeons.

Board-certified in orthopedic surgery and as a medical examiner, he is the recipient of numerous honors and awards, including the Rancho Los Amigos Research Award, the Philip D. Wilson Research Award at Cornell University, and the Otto Aufranc Research Award from the Hip Society. Through his research efforts, he seeks to improve surgical treatment of femur fractures as well as of hip and knee replacements. He has presented nearly 100 scientific papers and exhibits and has authored numerous articles and abstracts.

Brien was President of the Beverly Hills Board of Education from 1999 to 2003. In 1998, he was appointed to the Recreation and Parks Commission, later serving as the vice-chairperson. He was elected to the BHUSD Board of Education and served one term from 1999 to 2003. He also served as president of the Beverly Hills Little League, as an assistant commissioner for AYSO Region 76, a member of the Southern California chapter of the Arthritis Foundation's board of directors, and is active in the United Jewish Fund.

In 2016, Brien was vice president of medical operations and chief clinical officer at Baylor St. Luke's Medical Center in Houston. The position required him to resign his seat on the Beverly Hills City Council.

== Milestones ==
In August 2010, the Beverly Hills City Council paid tribute to Senator Thomas Kuchel on the 100th anniversary of his birth. Thomas' widow Betty Kuchel and daughter Karen Kuchel accepted a proclamation from Councilman Brien at the August 17th council meeting. Kuchel was a contemporary of Brien's grandfather Earl Warren in California politics.

== Family ==
Willie and his wife, Connie Agnew, also a physician, have four children: Willie Jr., Brent, Kelly and Ashley who attended Beverly Hills schools. Willie Jr. graduated from Yale University and Harvard Law School, Brent graduated from Carnegie Mellon University and the University of Minnesota Law School, Kelly graduated from the University of Colorado at Boulder, and Ashley graduated from Duke University in 2016.
