= Robert Wunderlich =

American politician; mayor of Beverly Hills, California

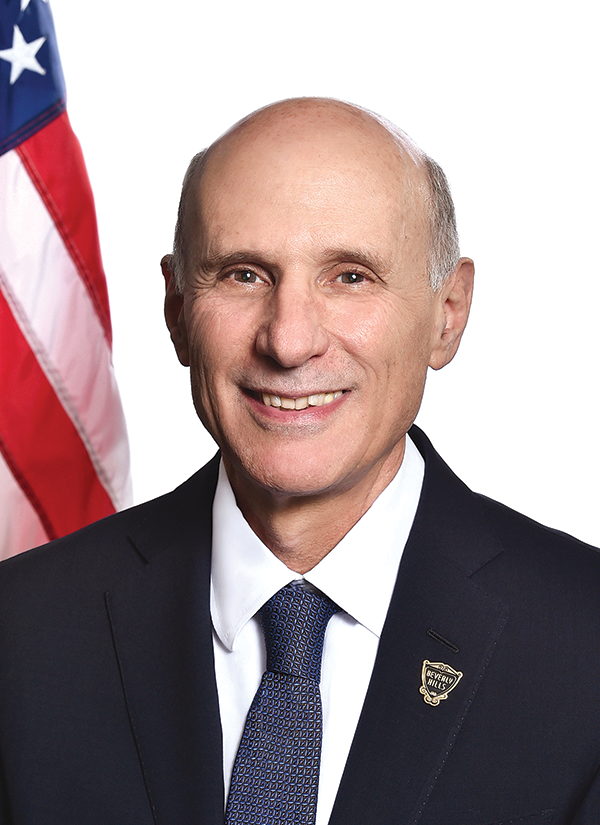

81st Mayor of Beverly Hills
- In office April 6, 2021 – April 5, 2022
- Preceded by: Lester Friedman
- Succeeded by: Lili Bosse

Personal details
- Born: Queens, New York
- Education: Columbia University (BA); Harvard University (PhD); University of California, Los Angeles (MBA)
- Profession: Politician, consultant, chemical engineer

Robert Wunderlich is an American politician. He served as the 81st mayor of Beverly Hills, California.

== Biography ==
Wunderlich grew up the son of an electrician in Queens, New York. He then went on to study English and earned a B.A. in chemistry from Columbia University on a scholarship from the electrician’s union, graduating in 1975. He then received a master's in physics and a Ph.D. in chemical physics from Harvard University.

Inspired by his wife, Andrea Spatz, who is a financial planner, Wunderlich earned an MBA in finance from UCLA and went on to found a financial consulting firm. He began his public service by serving as Beverly Hills' representative of the Metropolitan Water District of Southern California from 2007. In 2017, he won the race for City Councilman focusing on the city's infrastructure, environmental sustainability and transportation. Wunderlich won the race by a narrow margin of 18 votes.

On April 6, 2021, he was installed as mayor of Beverly Hills, California in a virtual ceremony.
