= National Board of Review Awards 1956 =

Annual US film awards ceremony

28th National Board of Review Awards

December 20, 1956

The 28th National Board of Review Awards were announced on December 20, 1956.

== Top Ten Films ==
1. Around the World in 80 Days
2. Moby Dick
3. The King and I
4. Lust for Life
5. Friendly Persuasion
6. Somebody Up There Likes Me
7. The Catered Affair
8. Anastasia
9. The Man Who Never Was
10. Bus Stop

== Top Foreign Films ==
1. The Silent World
2. War and Peace
3. Richard III
4. La strada
5. Rififi

== Winners ==
- Best Film: Around the World in 80 Days
- Best Foreign Film: The Silent World
- Best Actor: Yul Brynner (The King and I, Anastasia, The Ten Commandments)
- Best Actress: Dorothy McGuire (Friendly Persuasion)
- Best Supporting Actor: Richard Basehart (Moby Dick)
- Best Supporting Actress: Debbie Reynolds (The Catered Affair)
- Best Director: John Huston (Moby Dick)
