= Lili Bosse =

American politician (born 1961)

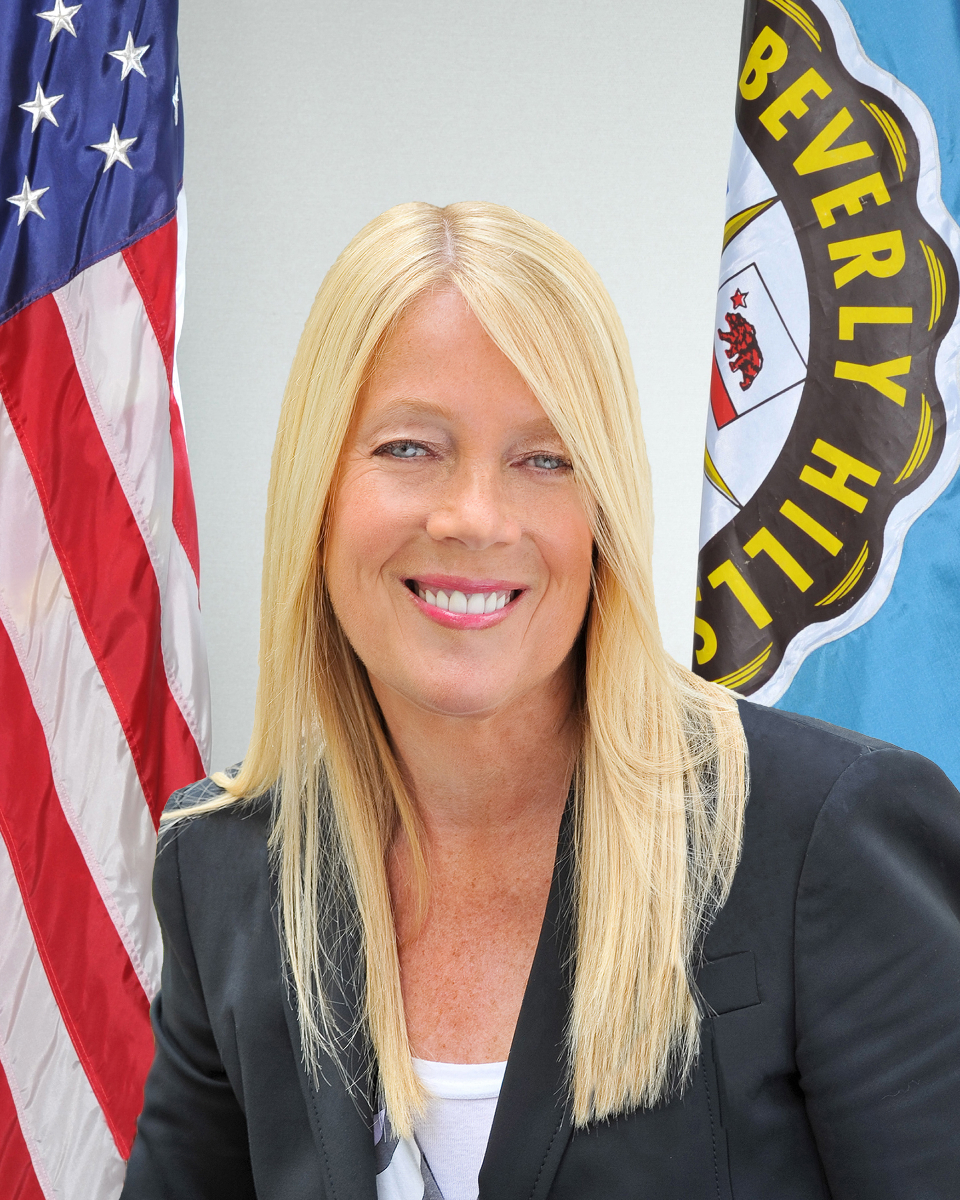
- Lili Bosse, three-time Mayor of Beverly Hills

73rd, 76th, and 82nd Mayor of Beverly Hills
- In office April 5, 2022 – April 4, 2023
- Preceded by: Robert Wunderlich
- In office March 28, 2017 – March 20, 2018
- Preceded by: John A. Mirisch
- Succeeded by: Julian Gold
- In office March 25, 2014 – March 24, 2015
- Preceded by: John A. Mirisch
- Succeeded by: Julian Gold

Personal details
- Born: Lili Toren; October 6, 1961 (age 65) Rego Park, New York, U.S.
- Spouse: Jon Bosse
- Children: 2
- Education: University of Southern California
- Profession: Politician, philanthropist

Lili Bosse (née Toren; born October 6, 1961) is an American politician and philanthropist who served three non-consecutive terms as Mayor of Beverly Hills, California (2014–15, 2017–18, 2022–23). She has been a member of the Beverly Hills City Council since 2011.

== Early life ==
Bosse was born in Rego Park, Queens, New York City, to Holocaust survivors Rosalia and Jack Toren. The majority of her extended family had been murdered in the Holocaust. At the age of nine, her family relocated to Beverly Hills, California.

Her parents met in Israel shortly after World War II and later immigrated to the United States. Her mother, Rosalia Toren (née Orenstein), was born in Poland and authored two books about her experiences escaping from the Auschwitz concentration camp. She died in February 2015. Bosse's father, Jack Toren, died in 1993.

Bosse graduated from the University of Southern California.

== Political career ==
Bosse served on the Beverly Hills Traffic and Parking Commission from 1997 to 2002, and the Beverly Hills Planning Commission from 2007 to 2011. In 2011, she was elected to the Beverly Hills City Council.

In 2013, Bosse was appointed vice mayor. In March 2014, she was sworn in as the city's mayor at the Wallis Annenberg Center for the Performing Arts. Actor Sidney Poitier administered the oath of office.

In 2014, Bosse supported a City Council resolution urging Brunei Sultan Hassanal Bolkiah to divest from the Beverly Hills Hotel after the government of Brunei adopted Islamic sharia law. She stated she would not visit the hotel until the issue was resolved.

In May 2014, Bosse led a delegation to China to promote trade between Beverly Hills and several Chinese cities, with a focus on industries making luxury goods. Her delegation's visit included stops in Beijing, Guangzhou, and Wuhan.

Bosse began her second term as the city's mayor in March 2017. She re-launched her "Walk With the Mayor" program and announced a partnership between the City of Beverly Hills and author Deepak Chopra. In August 2017, she introduced the Beverly Hills Open Later Days (BOLD) initiative, encouraging businesses on Rodeo Drive and elsewhere to extend evening hours.

In April 2022, Bosse was sworn in for a third term as the city's mayor. During this period, she launched the Real Time Watch Centre to monitor public areas and introduced a "BHPD Alert" system to provide residents with updates on police activity.

In October 2022, following the murder of Mahsa Amini and the subsequent protests that erupted across Iran, Bosse led the City Council in passing a resolution that called for sanctions against the Islamic Republic of Iran, including that country's removal from the United Nations Commission on the Status of Women.

In December 2022, she participated in the second annual Mayors' Summit Against Antisemitism in Athens, Greece, where leaders from 53 different cities and 23 countries signed a joint declaration, pledging to combat antisemitism through education, awareness, and interfaith cooperation.

== Philanthropy ==
She served as president of the Beverly Hills Education Foundation and received the Spirit of Philanthropy Award. She also contributed to the Beverly Hills 9/11 Memorial Garden, alongside serving as a founding member of the Police and Community Together organization.

In 2013, she and her husband, Jon Bosse, donated $100,000 to the Moriah Films division of the Simon Wiesenthal Center to honor her mother's 90th birthday. As a part of this donation, her mother's name, Rose Orenstein Toren, was included in the credits of all subsequent Moriah Films productions. That year, the couple also joined the Southern California Regional Council of Birthright Israel, a Jewish heritage organization.

Bosse co-founded Visionary Women, a nonprofit organization focused on women in leadership, where she also serves on the executive board. She also serves as a fellow of Vital Voices, a global network of women's leadership.

== Personal life ==
Bosse is married to Jon Bosse, the co-president and chief investment officer of NWQ, an affiliate of Nuveen Investments. They have two sons and reside in Beverly Hills, California.
