= A. Fredric Leopold =

American lawyer and politician

- Born: November 10, 1919
- Died: January 1, 2008 (age 88)
- Education: B.A. Dartmouth College; J.D. Columbia Law School
- Spouses: Adele Hall (divorced); Joan Leopold
- Children: Georgena Felicia Leopold; Dorian Leopold Dreyfuss; Fredric Leopold; Tess Leopold; Michael Wilmeth (stepson)
- Family: Dorothy Schiff (mother-in-law)

A. Fredric Leopold (November 10, 1919 – January 1, 2008) was an American entertainment lawyer and politician. He served as the mayor of Beverly Hills, California, from 1967 to 1968 and from 1971 to 1972.

== Career ==
Leopold served during World War II as a lieutenant in the Navy where he earned five battle stars. He was a Phi Beta Kappa graduate of Dartmouth College and a Harlan Fiske Stone Scholar graduate of Columbia Law School. He founded the law firm of “Youngman, Hungate & Leopold” which later became “Leopold, Petrich & Smith” where he earned the nickname "dean of the Hollywood script vetters" as he was one of a very few lawyers who would review programming for legal liability that either involved ordinary people in risky situations or hidden cameras such as Survivor, Cops, or Big Brother. His legal work in helping to bring about Disneyland was recognized by Walt Disney by putting the firm Youngman & Leopold on a window above the Disneyana store on Main Street in Disneyland.

He received a Lifetime Achievement award from the Los Angeles Copyright Society where he served as president. Leopold served as mayor of Beverly Hills from 1967-1968 and 1971-1972, as a Delegate to the Democratic National Convention in 1968, served as the Treasurer of the Democratic State Committee, and as Vice Chairman of the Los Angeles County Council of Mayors.

== Personal life ==
He was married 3 times. He had two daughters with his first wife, Georgene and Dorian Leopold. His second wife was Adele Hall, daughter of publisher Dorothy Schiff; they had 2 children, Fredric Leopold and Theresa "Tess" Leopold. His third wife was Joan Leopold; he also has a stepson, Michael Wilmeth. He was survived by eight grandchildren: Justin, Rebecka, Alexander, Madelyn, Patrick, Caroline, Adele, and Claudia. Funeral services were held at Hillside Memorial Park.

Political offices
Preceded by Jacob M. Stuchen	Mayor of Beverly Hills, California; 1967–1968	Succeeded by George Slaff
Preceded by Jacob M. Stuchen	Mayor of Beverly Hills, California; 1971–1972	Succeeded by Richard A. Stone
