= List of mayors of Beverly Hills, California =

Mayor of Beverly Hills
- Seal of Beverly Hills

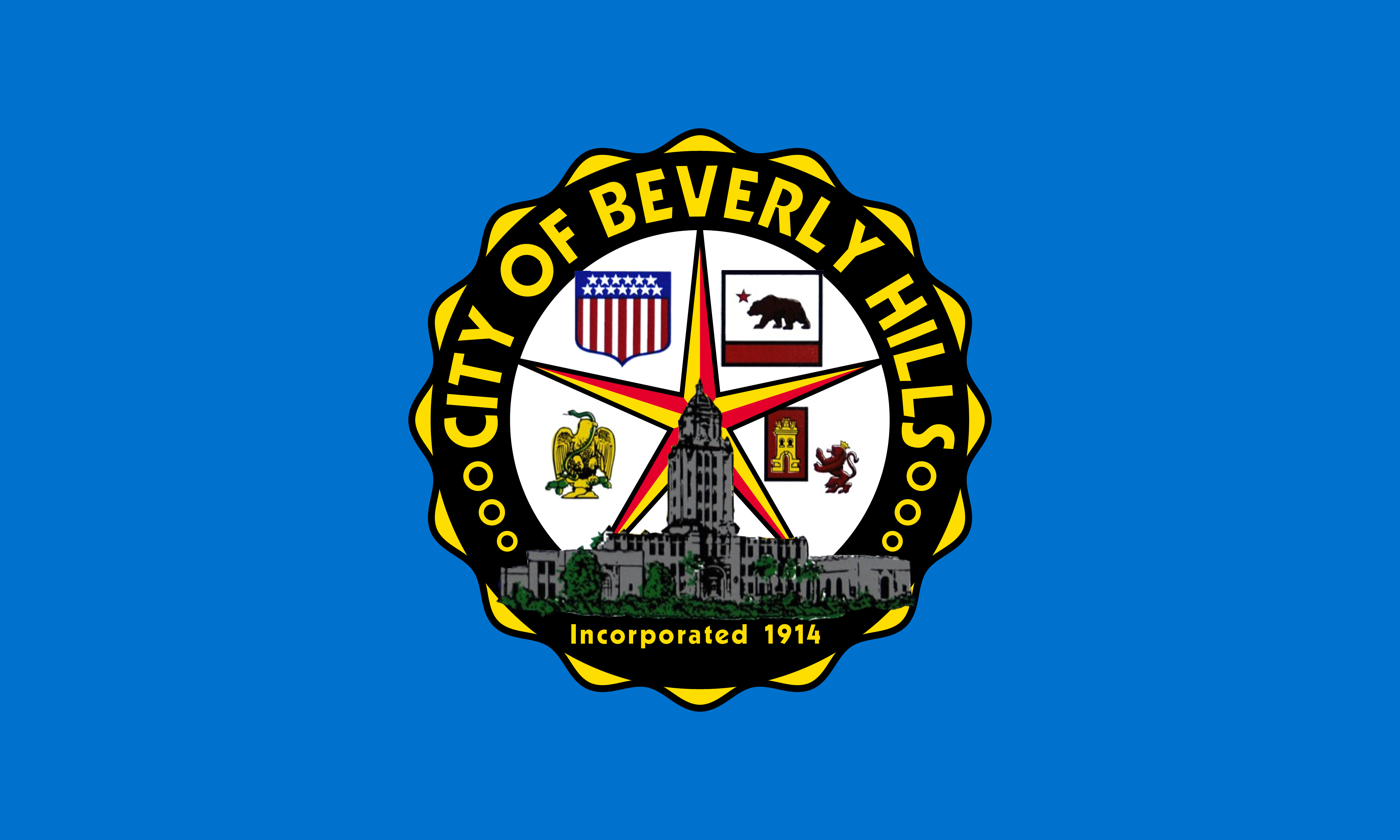
- Flag of Beverly Hills

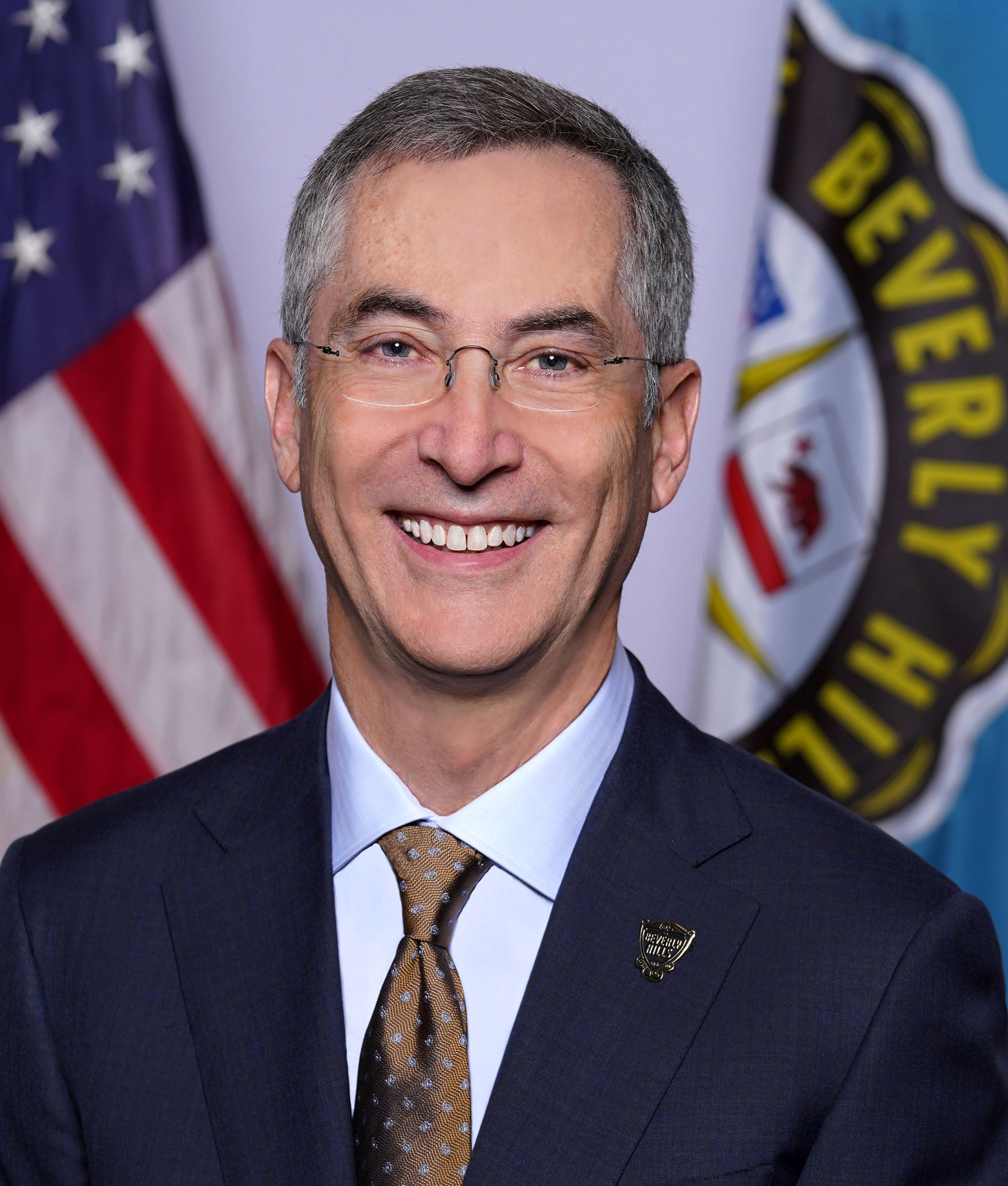
- Incumbent; Craig A. Corman since April 14, 2026
- Term length: 1 year
- Formation: April 17, 1922
- First holder: Silsby Spalding

Beverly Hills, California, was incorporated January 24, 1914. The City Council members of Beverly Hills are elected by the voters. The rotating positions of Mayor and Vice Mayor are selected by the City Council from among themselves. The following is a list of the city's mayors.

== Mayors of Beverly Hills ==
=== Ex-officio mayors ===
No.	Portrait	Officeholder	Tenure start	Tenure end	Ref.
1		William Todd Gould	January 28, 1914	April 24, 1916	
2		Pierce E. Benedict	April 24, 1916	April 17, 1922	

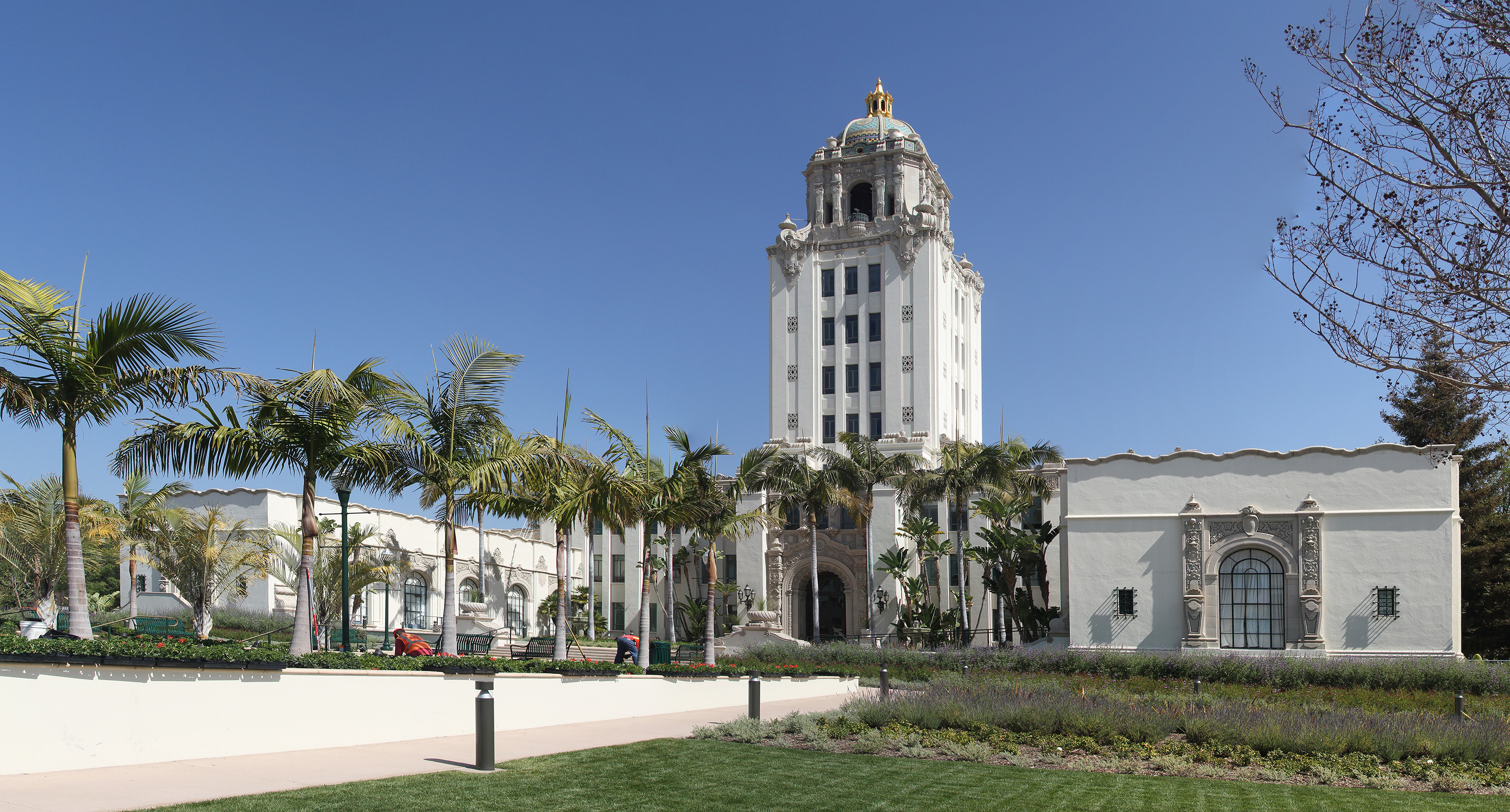
The mayoral offices are located in the Beverly Hills City Hall.

=== Mayors ===
No.	Portrait	Officeholder	Tenure start	Tenure end	Ref.
1		Silsby Spalding	April 17, 1922	July 23, 1929	
–		Will Rogers	December 21, 1926	December 23, 1926	
2		Paul E. Schwab	July 23, 1929	March 21, 1933	
3		Edward E. Spence	March 28, 1933	May 18, 1941	
4		James L. Kennedy	June 3, 1941	April 21, 1942	
5		Arthur L. Erb	April 21, 1942	August 28, 1945	
6		E. P. Dentzel	September 25, 1945	April 20, 1948	
7		Otto A. Gerth	April 20, 1948	April 18, 1950	
8		F. Britton McConnell	April 18, 1950	May 1, 1951	
9		C. Dean Olson	May 1, 1951	April 5, 1952	
10		David Tannenbaum	April 15, 1952	March 31, 1953	
11		Floyd E. Fischer	March 31, 1953	May 4, 1954	
12		Harold L. George	May 4, 1954	March 29, 1955	
13		George W. Davis	March 29, 1955	June 6, 1956	
14		David Tannenbaum	June 7, 1956	July 30, 1957	
15		Floyd E. Fischer	July 30, 1957	April 15, 1958	
16		George W. Davis	April 15, 1958	September 15, 1959	
17		Harold L. George	September 15, 1959	January 19, 1960	
18		Hugh W. Darling	January 19, 1960	April 18, 1961	
19		Jack Freeman	April 18, 1961	April 17, 1962	
20		Leroy H. Watson	April 17, 1962	April 16, 1963	
21		Eugene W. Gunther	April 16, 1963	1964	
22		Leonard Horwin	1964	1965	
23		Frank Clapp	1965	1966	
24		Jacob M. Stuchen	1966	1967	
25		A. Fredric Leopold	1967	1968	
26		George Slaff	1968	1969	
27		Frank Clapp	1969	1970	
28		Jacob M. Stuchen	1970	1971	
29		A. Fredric Leopold	1971	1972	
30		Richard A. Stone	1972	1973	
31		Phyllis Seaton	1973	1974	
32		Charles Aronberg	1974	1975	
33		George Slaff	1975	1976	
34		Donna Ellman-Garber	1976	1977	
35		Richard A. Stone	1977	1978	
36		Joseph N. Tilem	1978	1979	
37		Charles Aronberg	1979	1980	
38		Edward I. Brown	1980	1981	
39		Donna Ellman-Garber	1981	1982	
40		Benjamin H. Stansbury Jr.	1982	1983	
41		Benjamin Norton	1983	1984	
42		Annabelle Heiferman	1984	1985	
43		Edward I. Brown	1985	April 15, 1986	
44		Charlotte Spadaro	April 15, 1986	April 5, 1987	
45		Benjamin H. Stansbury Jr.	April 5, 1987	April 19, 1988	
46		Robert K. Tanenbaum	April 19, 1988	1989	
47		Maxwell H. Salter	1989	1990	
48		Allan Alexander	1990	1991	
49		Vicki Reynolds	1991	1992	
50		Robert K. Tanenbaum	1992	1993	
51		Maxwell H. Salter	1993	1994	
52		Vicki Reynolds	1994	1995	
53		Allan Alexander	1995	1996	
54		Thomas S. Levyn	1996	1997	
55		MeraLee Goldman	1997	1998	
56		Les Bronte	1998	1999	
57		Thomas S. Levyn	1999	2000	
58		Vicki Reynolds	2000	2001	
59		Mark Egerman	2001	2002	
60		MeraLee Goldman	2002	2003	
61		Thomas S. Levyn	2003	2004	
62		Mark Egerman	2004	2005	
63		Linda J. Briskman	2005	March 21, 2006	
64		Stephen P. Webb	March 21, 2006	March 27, 2007	
65		Jimmy Delshad	March 27, 2007	March 22, 2008	
66		Barry Brucker	March 22, 2008	March 11, 2009	
67		Frank Fenton	March 11, 2009	March 25, 2009	
68		Nancy Krasne	March 25, 2009	March 16, 2010	
70		Jimmy Delshad	March 16, 2010	March 22, 2011	
71		Barry Brucker	March 22, 2011	March 20, 2012	
72		William W. Brien	March 20, 2012	March 27, 2013	
73		John A. Mirisch	March 27, 2013	March 25, 2014	
74		Lili Bosse	March 25, 2014	March 24, 2015	
75		Julian Gold	March 24, 2015	March 2016	
76		John A. Mirisch	March 2016	March 28, 2017	
77		Lili Bosse	March 28, 2017	March 20, 2018	
78		Julian Gold	March 20, 2018	March 20, 2019	
79		John A. Mirisch	March 20, 2019	March 31, 2020	
80		Lester Friedman	March 31, 2020	April 6, 2021	
81		Robert Wunderlich	April 6, 2021	April 5, 2022	
82		Lili Bosse	April 5, 2022	April 4, 2023	
82		Julian Gold	April 4, 2023	April 2, 2024	
84		Lester Friedman	April 2, 2024	April 1, 2025	
85		Sharona Nazarian	April 1, 2025	April 14, 2026	
86		Craig A. Corman	April 14, 2026	Incumbent	
