= Stephen P. Webb =

American politician (born 1946)

Stephen P. Webb (born February 23, 1946) is an American politician. He served on the Beverly Hills Planning Commission, and was elected to the Beverly Hills City Council in 2003. He served as the mayor of Beverly Hills, California from 2006 to 2007. He was defeated for re-election in 2007.

== Biography ==
He attended the University of Denver and received a B.A. from the California State University at Northridge in 1968. In 1971, he received a J.D. from the University of San Diego.

He is a partner at Tilles, Webb, Kulla & Grant, ALC in Beverly Hills.

== Personal life ==
He is married to Bonnie Wood Webb, and they have two adult children.

Political offices
Preceded by Linda J. Briskman	Mayor of Beverly Hills, California; 2006-2007	Succeeded by Jimmy Delshad
