= Harold Mirisch =

American film production company executive

- Born: April 5, 1907; New York City, U.S.
- Died: December 5, 1968 (aged 61); Beverly Hills, California, U.S.
- Occupation: Film producer
- Spouse: Lottie Mandell (m. 1928)
- Children: 2
- Relatives: Walter Mirisch (half-brother); Marvin Mirisch (half-brother); John A. Mirisch (grandson)

Harold Mirisch (March 4, 1907 – December 5, 1968) was an American film production company executive.

== Early life ==
He was born on May 4, 1907 to a Jewish family in New York, New York, one of two sons born to Flora (née Glasshut) and Max Mirisch. His father emigrated from Kraków in 1891 at the age of 17, arriving in New York City where he worked as a tailor. His mother was the daughter of immigrants; she died of cancer at the age of 40 and his father remarried to Josephine Frances Urbach with whom he had two sons. He was the brother of Irving Mirisch and half-brother of Marvin Mirisch and Walter Mirisch.

== Career ==
At the age of 14, Mirisch worked as an office boy at Warner Brothers in New York City. In 1938, at the prodding of a Warner executive, he moved to Memphis where he learned the theater management side of the business. In 1942, he joined RKO Theaters in New York City and was in charge of booking their circuit. In 1947, he moved to Los Angeles with his brothers to produce low‐budget films for Allied Artists. He made a fortune in the Midwest thanks to the Theater Candy Company, which sold candies to moviegoers.

He moved to California, and served as Vice President of Allied Artists, a film production company. He was an uncredited executive producer on Beachhead in 1954. In 1957, together with his brothers Marvin and Walter, he co-founded The Mirisch Company, one of the leading independent production companies, and served as its President.

== Personal life and death ==
In 1928, he married Lottie Mandell; they had two children, Maxine Mirisch Segal and Robert Mirisch. Prior to his death on December 5, 1968, in Beverly Hills.

His grandson, John A. Mirisch, served as the mayor of Beverly Hills, California from March 2013 to March 2014.
