= Mayres =

Mayres may refer to the following places in France:

- Mayres, Ardèche, commune in the department of Ardèche
- Mayres, Puy-de-Dôme, commune in the department of Puy-de-Dôme
- Mayres-Savel, commune in the department of Isère
