= Linus Child =

American politician

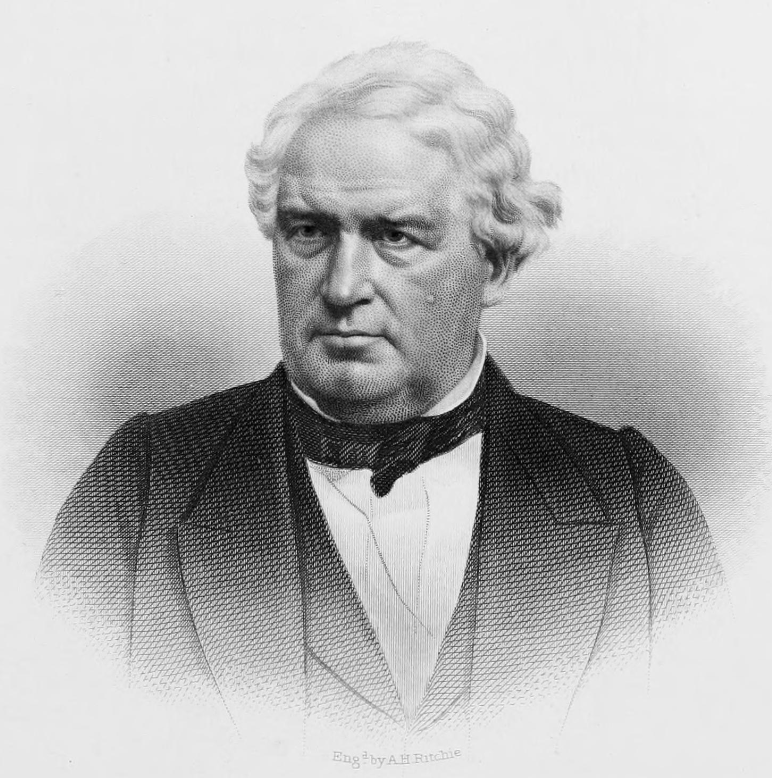

Member of the Massachusetts Senate
- In office 1835–1840

Personal details
- Born: February 27, 1802 North Woodstock, Connecticut
- Died: August 26, 1870 (aged 68) Hingham, Massachusetts
- Spouse: Berinthia Mason (m. 1829)
- Children: 3
- Education: Yale College
- Occupation: Lawyer, politician

Linus Child (February 27, 1802 – August 26, 1870) was an American lawyer and politician.

== Biography ==
Child was born in North Woodstock, Connecticut, February 27, 1802, being one of nine children of Rensselaer and Priscilla (Cowles) Child. He completed his preparatory studies at the Colchester Academy, and entered Yale College near the close of the Freshman year, where he graduated in 1824.

After studying with S. P. Staples, Esq., of New Haven, and Hon. E. Stoddard, of Woodstock, he was admitted to the bar in Connecticut in 1826. He then spent a year in the office of Hon. George Tufts, of Dudley, Massachusetts, and in 1827 began the practice of law in Southbridge, where he continued till 1845. In that year, relinquishing his profession, he removed to Lowell, to take charge of one of the large manufacturing establishments of that city, in which employment he continued till 1862, when he resumed the practice of the law in Boston in company with his son, and so continued till his death.

In 1835 he was chosen a member of the Massachusetts Senate, and continued in that body for five years. As chairman of the Rail Road Committee during that time, he had a large share in shaping the railroad charters and policy of Massachusetts. He was for many years a member of the Prudential Committee of the American Board of Commissioners for Foreign Missions, and of the Boards of Trustees of Amherst College, Andover Theological Seminary, and Phillips' Academy at Andover to these and kindred institutions he devoted a large share of his time.

Child was married, in 1829, to Berinthia, daughter of Oliver Mason, Esq, of Southbridge, and by her had two daughters and one son.

He died in Hingham, Massachusetts, his summer residence, suddenly, of congestion, on August 26, 1870, in his 69th year.
