= Marvin Mirisch =

American film producer

- Born: Marvin Eliot Mirisch; March 19, 1918; New York City, U.S.
- Died: November 17, 2002 (aged 84); Los Angeles, California, U.S.
- Occupation: Film producer
- Spouse: Florence Smuckler (m. 1942)
- Children: 3
- Relatives: Walter Mirisch (brother); Harold Mirisch (half-brother); John A. Mirisch (half-great-nephew)

Marvin Eliot Mirisch (March 19, 1918 – November 17, 2002) was an American film producer.

== Biography ==
Mirisch was born to a Jewish family on March 19, 1918, in New York City, one of two sons born to Josephine Frances (née Urbach) and Max Mirisch. His father emigrated from Kraków in 1891 at the age of 17 arriving in New York City where he worked as a tailor. His mother was the daughter of immigrants from Hungary and Poland. His father was previously married to Flora Glasshut with whom he had two sons; she died of cancer at the age of 40. He was the brother of Walter Mirisch and the half-brother of Harold Mirisch, who were also film executives; and the half-brother of Irving Mirisch, who ran a company which supplied candy to movie theatres.

== Career ==
In 1953, he moved to Los Angeles to join his brothers Harold and Walter at Monogram Pictures, later known as Allied Artists. In 1957, they founded The Mirisch Company, one of the leading independent production companies. He was the executive producer of the movies Romantic Comedy (1983) and Dracula (1979). He was associate producer for The Human Jungle and Arrow in the Dust (both 1954).

== Personal life and death ==
Mirisch was married to Florene Smuckler for 60 years; they had three children: Donald I. Mirisch; Carol Mirisch Hartmann, and Lynn Mirisch Rogo. He died of a heart attack on November 17, 2002, in Los Angeles, at the age of 84. He was buried in the Hillside Memorial Park Cemetery, a Jewish cemetery in Culver City, California. His great-nephew, John A. Mirisch has served as the mayor of Beverly Hills, California, since March 2013.
