= Walter Mirisch =

American film producer (1921–2023)

- Born: Walter Mortimer Mirisch; November 8, 1921; New York City, U.S.
- Died: February 24, 2023 (aged 101); Los Angeles, California, U.S.
- Occupation: Film producer
- Spouse: Patricia Kahan (died 2005)
- Children: 3
- Awards: Academy Award for Best Picture as producer of In the Heat of the Night (1967); Producer of the Year Award, Producers' Guild of America (1967)

Walter Mortimer Mirisch (November 8, 1921 – February 24, 2023) was an American film producer. He was the president and executive head of production of The Mirisch Corporation, an independent film production company which he formed in 1957 with his brother, Marvin, and half-brother, Harold. He won the Academy Award for Best Picture as producer of In the Heat of the Night (1967).

== Life and career ==
=== Early years ===
Born to a Jewish family in New York, Mirisch was the youngest of three sons born to Josephine Frances (née Urbach) and Max Mirisch. His siblings included film producer Marvin. His father emigrated from Kraków, Poland in 1891 at the age of 17, arriving in New York City where he worked as a tailor. His mother was the daughter of immigrants from Hungary and Poland. His father was previously married to Flora Glasshut with whom he had two sons; she died of cancer at the age of 40. Walter Mirisch graduated from DeWitt Clinton High School. He was a summer vacation usher in Jersey City's State Theater, his first job associated with the movie business. He soon moved up to higher positions at other theaters.

A heart murmur kept him from joining the Navy, but Mirisch was still eager to serve his country during World War II. He moved to Burbank, California, to work at a bomber-plane plant, where he wrote technical articles, sharing knowledge with other military manufacturers. After the war ended Mirisch immediately turned his attention back to his original passion, the movies. In 1942, he received a BA degree from the University of Wisconsin–Madison and the next year he graduated from Harvard's Graduate School of Business Administration. He produced his first film, Fall Guy (1947), for Monogram Pictures.

=== Career ===
At the age of 29, Mirisch became production head at Allied Artists Studio, initially only a division of Monogram, with some 30 films to oversee. During his tenure, he found time to personally produce Flat Top (1952), Wichita (1955), which received a Golden Globe Award from the Hollywood Foreign Press Association as Best Outdoor Drama of 1955, The First Texan (1956), and An Annapolis Story (1955). Among other films, he supervised the productions of Invasion of the Body Snatchers, Friendly Persuasion (both 1956), and the Billy Wilder-directed Love in the Afternoon (1957).

The Mirisch Company was founded in 1957. It produced 68 films for United Artists, including three that won the Academy Award for Best Picture, namely The Apartment (1960), West Side Story (1961) and In the Heat of the Night (1967), which also won four other Oscars. Among the most noteworthy Mirisch projects that Walter personally produced are: Man of the West (1958); The Magnificent Seven (1960); Two for the Seesaw (1962); Toys in the Attic (1963); the film version of James A. Michener's monumental novel, Hawaii (1966), which was nominated for seven Oscars, and its sequel, The Hawaiians (1970); Midway (1976), the saga of America's greatest naval victory; the tender and moving Same Time, Next Year (1978); and Romantic Comedy (1983).

For the NBC television network, Mirisch was executive producer of Wichita Town with Joel McCrea (1959–1960), Peter Loves Mary (1960–1961), Desperado; Return of Desperado; Desperado: Avalanche At Devil’s Ridge; Desperado: Legacy; Desperado: Sole Survivor; and in 1993, Troubleshooters: Trapped Beneath The Earth. Mirisch was executive producer of Lily in Winter for the USA Network in 1994, A Class for Life for ABC in 1995, as well as The Magnificent Seven, a weekly series for CBS in 1997.

Ron Howard said of Mirisch, "From Bomba, the Jungle Boy to Some Like It Hot and In the Heat of the Night ... Walter Mirisch produced many of the films which dazzled and inspired me (and I'm not kidding about Bomba. I loved those movies as a kid). When I later acted in one of his (lesser) productions, The Spikes Gang, I learned that a prolific and brilliant producer could also be a terrific guy and a wonderful teacher."

=== Honors and awards ===
Mirisch received the 1967 Academy Award for Best Picture for his production of In the Heat of the Night.

Throughout the years he was the recipient of numerous awards and honors, including The Producer of the Year Award: first, from the Producers' Guild of America (1967); later, the National Association of Theatre Owners (1972); and then ShowaRama (1975).

In addition, he received the Cecil B. DeMille Award of the Hollywood Foreign Press Association for "outstanding contribution to the entertainment field" (1976), the Irving G. Thalberg Memorial Award of the Academy of Motion Picture Arts and Sciences for his "consistently high quality of motion picture production (1978), and the Academy's Jean Hersholt Humanitarian Award, which is given to an individual whose "humanitarian efforts have brought credit to the industry" (1983).

Mirisch served three terms as president of the Producers Guild of America. He served four terms as President of the Academy of Motion Picture Arts and Sciences. He was a former president and Governor of the Performing Arts Council of the Los Angeles Music Center, as well as a trustee of the Motion Picture and Television Fund. Mirisch was also an Emeritus member of the board of directors of Cedars-Sinai Medical Center of Los Angeles, and the board of directors of the UCLA Foundation.

He was decorated by the Republic of France with its Order of Arts and Letters in 1961.

In May 1989, he received an honorary doctorate in Humane Letters from the University of Wisconsin–Madison. In June 1989, he was the recipient of the UCLA Medal, the university's highest award.

In 2004, he was honored with a retrospective at the Los Angeles County Museum of Art entitled "The Magnificent Mirisches". The Museum of Modern Art (MoMA) in New York honored him in 2006 with a retrospective of twelve films.

On February 2, 2008, Mirisch presented the Darryl F. Zanuck Producer of the Year award at the 19th Annual Producers Guild of America Awards. The top honor (the equivalent of the Academy Award for Best Picture) went to Scott Rudin, Joel and Ethan Coen for No Country for Old Men.

== Personal life and death ==
Mirisch was married to Patricia Kahan (1924–2005); they had three children.

Mirisch turned 100 on November 8, 2021, and died of natural causes in Los Angeles on February 24, 2023, at the age of 101.

== Selected filmography ==
Year	Title	Notes
1958	Fort Massacre	producer
1958	Man of the West	producer
1959	The Gunfight at Dodge City	producer
1959	The Man in the Net	producer
1959	Cast a Long Shadow	producer
1960	The Magnificent Seven	executive producer
1961	By Love Possessed	producer
1961	West Side Story	executive producer (uncredited)
1961	The Children's Hour	executive producer (uncredited)
1962	Follow That Dream	executive producer (uncreated)
1962	Kid Galahad	executive producer (uncredited)
1962	Two for the Seesaw	producer
1963	The Great Escape	executive producer (uncredited)
1963	Toys in the Attic	producer
1963	The Pink Panther	executive producer (uncredited)
1964	633 Squadron	executive producer (uncredited)
1964	A Shot in the Dark	executive producer (uncredited)
1966	The Russians Are Coming, the Russians Are Coming	producer (uncredited)
1966	Hawaii	producer
1967	How to Succeed in Business Without Really Trying	executive producer (uncredited)
1967	In the Heat of the Night	producer
1967	Fitzwilly	producer
1968	The Party	executive producer (uncredited)
1968	The Thomas Crown Affair	executive producer (uncredited)
1969	Sinful Davey	executive producer
1969	Some Kind of a Nut	producer
1970	Halls of Anger	executive producer
1970	The Landlord	executive producer (uncredited)
1970	The Hawaiians	producer
1970	They Call Me Mister Tibbs!	executive producer
1971	The Organization	producer
1971	Fiddler on the Roof	executive producer (uncredited)
1973	Scorpio	producer
1974	The Spikes Gang	producer
1974	Mr. Majestyk	producer
1976	Midway	producer
1978	Gray Lady Down	producer
1978	Same Time, Next Year	producer
1979	Dracula	producer
1979	The Prisoner of Zenda	producer
1983	Romantic Comedy	producer
1993–1996	The Pink Panther	executive producer
2010	Pink Panther and Pals	executive producer
2016	The Magnificent Seven	executive producer

== Bibliography ==
- Mirisch, Walter (2008). I Thought We Were Making Movies, Not History. Madison, Wisconsin: University of Wisconsin Press. ISBN 978-0-299-22640-4.

Non-profit organization positions
Preceded by Daniel Taradash	President of Academy of Motion Pictures, Arts and Sciences; 1973–1977	Succeeded by Howard W. Koch
