= Jimmy Delshad =

Iranian-American politician

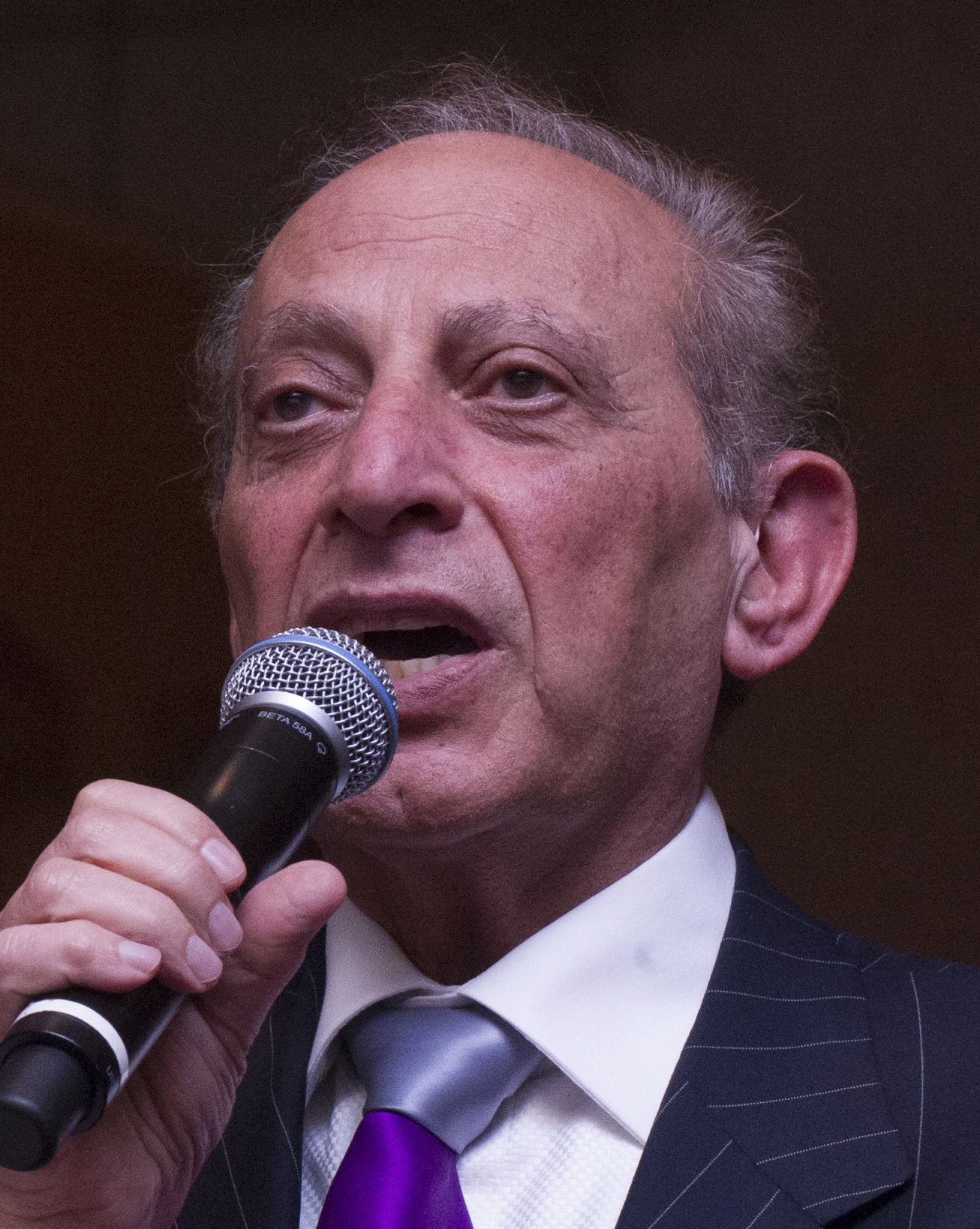
- Delshad in 2011

67th and 70th Mayor of Beverly Hills
- In office March 27, 2007 – March 18, 2008
- Preceded by: Stephen P. Webb
- Succeeded by: Barry Brucker
- In office March 16, 2010 – March 22, 2011
- Preceded by: Nancy Krasne
- Succeeded by: Barry Brucker

Personal details
- Born: March 22, 1940 (age 86) Shiraz, Imperial State of Iran
- Citizenship: United States
- Party: Democratic
- Spouse: Lonnie Gerstein Delshad

Jamshid "Jimmy" Delshad (Persian: جمشید «جیمی» دلشاد) is an Iranian-American politician in the state of California. He became Mayor of Beverly Hills on March 21, 2007 when he was sworn in by Fred Hayman, and again on March 16, 2010. He is the first Iranian-American to hold public office in Beverly Hills.

== Biography ==
Delshad was born to a Jewish family in Shiraz. He left Iran in 1959 and came to the United States with his brothers. He studied at the University of Minnesota and received his bachelor's degree from California State University, Northridge. He started a technology company in 1978.

== Political career ==
In 1998 he became the first Persian Jew to be elected as president of Sinai Temple, Los Angeles' oldest and largest Conservative congregation.

In 2003 he was elected to the Beverly Hills city council, and became mayor in 2007. On March 16, 2010, Delshad began his second one-year term as mayor of Beverly Hills.
