= Herman Melville bibliography =

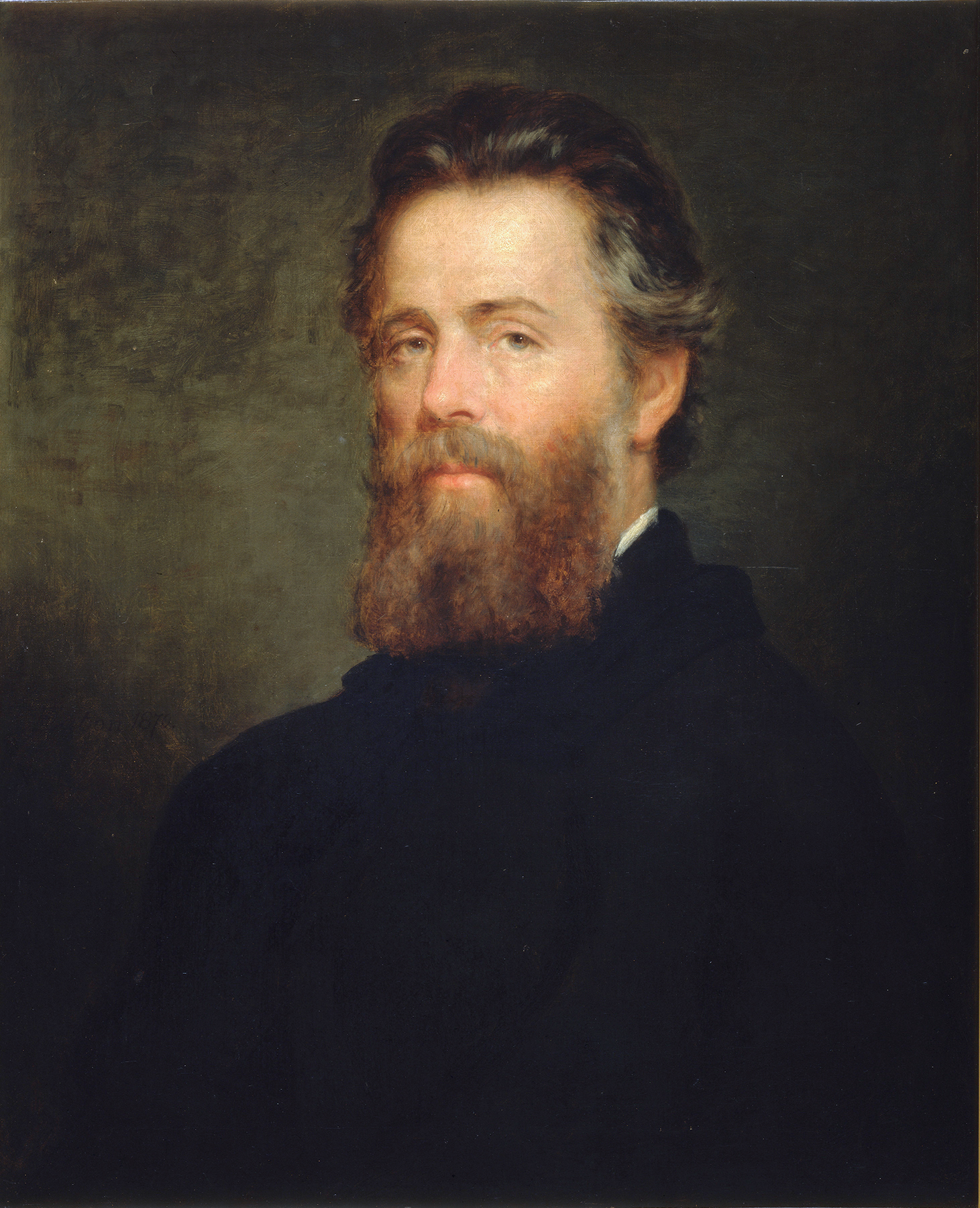
- Herman Melville, 1870. Oil painting by Joseph Oriel Eaton.
- Novels↙: 11
- Articles↙: 8
- Stories↙: 17
- Collections↙: 5
- Unfinished works↙: 1

The bibliography of Herman Melville includes magazine articles, book reviews, other occasional writings, and 15 books. Of these, seven books were published between 1846 and 1853, seven more between 1853 and 1891, and one in 1924. Melville was 26 when his first book was published, and his last book was not released until 33 years after his death. At the time of his death he was on the verge of completing the manuscript for his first novel in three decades, Billy Budd, and had accumulated several large folders of unpublished verse.

The year 1853 saw a physical disaster that renders the books published by him in America prior to that date even more scarce today than would normally have been the case. At one o'clock on the afternoon of Saturday, December 10, 1853, the establishment of Melville's publishers Harper Brothers was completely destroyed by fire, reportedly caused by a plumber throwing a lit candle into a bucket of camphene, which he mistook for water. The fire burned Harper's stock of Melville's unsold books, which consisted of Typee, 185; Omoo, 276; Mardi, 491; Redburn, 296; White Jacket, 292; Moby-Dick, 297; and Pierre, 494. Mardi and Pierre, Melville's two least popular books, had the largest number of unsold copies burned. Isle of the Cross is a possible lost work that was rejected for publication in 1853. That year was also the beginning of the long period of unpopularity precipitated by the appearance of Pierre in 1852 and exacerbated by the publication of The Confidence-Man in 1857. Melville then turned his attention to poetry, to which he devoted more years than he had to fiction.

A Melville revival that began in the 1920s led to the reprinting of many of his works, which had gone out of print in the United States, and the publication of the first collected edition. In 1926, Moby-Dick was among the first titles in the newly founded Modern Library series. Beginning in 1948, independent publisher Walter Hendricks recruited scholars to edit annotated editions of Melville's works, beginning with a volume of his poetry. Produced under the general editorship of Howard P. Vincent, the series was originally projected to include 14 volumes but in the end only 7 appeared.

Melville's lifetime earnings from his first seven books (over a period of 41 years, from 1846 to 1887) amounted to $10,444.53, of which $5,966.40 came from American publishers and $4,478.13 from British. The bestselling title in the United States was Typee (with 9,598 copies). The book that earned Melville the most in the United States was Omoo ($1,719.78).

== Reference edition ==
The scholarly reference edition is The Northwestern-Newberry Edition of the Writings of Herman Melville published in fifteen volumes by Northwestern University Press in conjunction with the Newberry Library and the Modern Language Association's Center for Scholarly Editions between 1968 and 2017, under the general editorship of Harrison Hayford, Hershel Parker and G. Thomas Tanselle.

Its aim is to present unmodernized critical texts which represent "as nearly as possible the author's intentions." The editors adopted as copy text either the author's fair-copy manuscript or the first printing based on it, which were then collated against any further printings in Melville's lifetime, since he might have made corrections or changes. In the case of Moby-Dick, for instance, after collating the American and British editions from the various printings, the editors adopted 185 revisions and corrections from the English edition and incorporated 237 emendations made by the editors. The editorial appendices for each volume include an historical note on composition and publication, an extensive account of the editorial process, a list of emendations and changes, as well as related documents.

All volumes remain in print in one format or another. Individual volumes are edited by Hayford, Parker and Tanselle unless otherwise indicated.

1. Typee, A Peep at Polynesian Life (1968)
2. Omoo, A Narrative of Adventures in the South Seas (1968)
3. Mardi and a Voyage Thither (1970)
4. Redburn, His First Voyage (1969)
5. White Jacket, or The World in a Man-of-War (1970)
6. Moby-Dick, or The Whale (1988)
7. Pierre, or The Ambiguities (1972)
8. Israel Potter, His Fifty Years of Exile (1982)
9. The Piazza Tales and Other Prose Pieces, 1839–1860 (1987) edited by Hayford, Tanselle and Alma MacDougall Reising
10. The Confidence-Man, His Masquerade (1984)
11. Published Poems (2009) edited by Hayford, Tanselle, Robert C. Ryan and Alma MacDougall Reising
12. Clarel, A Poem and Pilgrimage in the Holy Land (1991) edited by Hayford, Parker, Tanselle and Alma MacDougall Reising
13. Billy Budd, Sailor and Other Uncompleted Writings (2017) edited by Hayford, Tanselle, Robert A. Sandberg and Alma MacDougall Reising
14. Correspondence (1993) edited by Lynn Horth
15. Journals (1989) edited by Howard C. Horsford and Lynn Horth

The only previous collected edition of Melville's works was published in sixteen volumes by Constable of London between 1922 and 1924 under the supervision of Michael Sadleir. The Piazza Tales (1856), The Confidence-Man (1857), Battle-Pieces (1866) and Clarel (1876) were reprinted in this edition for the first time since their original publication. It also included the first publication of Billy Budd. Melville's earliest biographer, Raymond Weaver, is credited as the editor of the Billy Budd volume (the thirteenth, Billy Budd and Other Prose Pieces, 1924), but not of the edition as a whole. The Constable set was reissued in facsimile by Russell & Russell of New York in 1963. The Pequod Edition launched in 1924 by Albert & Charles Boni of New York under the editorship of Raymond Weaver was abandoned after four volumes (Israel Potter and Redburn in 1924, Moby-Dick and Mardi in 1925).

== Novels ==
Title	Date	First publisher	Notes
Typee: A Peep at Polynesian Life	1846	John Murray	Murray purchased the English rights to print 1000 copies for £100. It first appeared in two parts in Murray's Home and Colonial Library, Part I, February 26, 1846; Part II, April 1, 1846. Four thousand copies of the first edition of the book were printed. The American rights were purchased by Wiley & Putnam after John Murray had agreed to publish the book in England, so that the credit of having first recognized Melville belongs to Murray's London publishing house. It appeared in book form in 1846 simultaneously in New York and London, being one of the first works to be published in this manner. The sequel, containing "The Story of Toby", was written in July, 1846, and incorporated in the Revised Edition published in the same year. Extracts from the Sequel were also published prior to its appearance in book form. In England, John Murray paid an additional £50 for the Sequel, which was first printed as a small pamphlet in an edition of 1250 copies, and subsequently incorporated in the book. Reprinted: New York: Wiley and Putnam, 1847; Harpers, 1849 (new copyright, printed from original plates); 1850; 1855; 1857; 1865; 1871; 1876; Arthur Stedman, Ed., 1892; 1896; W. Clark Russell, Ed., 1904; Ernest Rhys, Ed., 1907; W. Clark Russell, Ed., 1911; A. L. Sterling, Ed., 1920; Ernest Rhys, Ed., 1921.; Boston: Arthur Stedman, Ed., 1900; 1910; 1919; W. P. Trent, Ed., 1902.; London: John Murray, 1847 (1000 copies); 1848 (1000 copies); 1850; 1855 (750 copies); 1861; 1866; 1877 (500 copies); 1893 (1000 copies); Routledge, 1855 (6000 copies); 1910; H. S. Salt, Ed., 1892; 1898, 1899; W. P. Trent, Ed., 1903; W. Clark Russell, Ed., 1904; 1910; Ernest Rhys, Ed., 1907; 1921.
Omoo: A Narrative of Adventures in the South Seas	1847	John Murray	The manuscript was written in 1846, and the book was published in March, 1847. In England, John Murray paid £150 for the copyright. Together with Typee, Omoo was one of the earliest works to be published simultaneously in New York and London. The first English edition consisted of 4000 copies. The Harper Brothers published in New York the same year. In their catalog for 1847 the book was advertised: "Muslin $1.25, paper $1.00." In 1849 Harper advertised: "In two parts 50 cents each, or complete in muslin gilt $1.25." Reprinted: New York: Harpers, 1847 (four re-printings); 1855; 1863; 1868; Arthur Stedman, Ed., 1892 (new copyright); 1896; H. Clark Russell, Ed., 1904; 1911; Ernest Rhys, Ed., 1908, 1921.; Boston: Arthur Stedman, Ed., 1900; 1910; 1919.; London: John Murray, 1848 (1000 copies); 1849; 1850; 1861 (1000 copies); 1866; 1877 (500 copies); 1893 (1000 copies); Routledge, 1855 (6000 copies); 1910; H. S. Salt, Ed., 1892; 1893; H. Clark Russell, Ed., 1904; 1911; Ernest Rhys, Ed., 1908; 1921.
Mardi: And a Voyage Thither	1849	Richard Bentley	The novel appeared in two volumes on March 16, 1849, in London (1000 copies), and on April 14, 1849, in New York in three volumes. It was the first Melville book published in England by Bentley. Raymond Weaver stated that up to February 22, 1850, 2154 copies were sold. Reprinted: New York: Harpers, 1855; 1864.
Redburn: His First Voyage	1849	Harper & Brothers	The manuscript was written in New York during the summer of 1849. The book appeared on August 18, 1849, in New York, and on September 29, 1849, in London (750 copies). Weaver stated that up to February 22, 1850, 4011 copies were sold. Reprinted: New York: Harpers, 1850; 1855; 1863.; London: Bentley, 1853.
White-Jacket; or, The World in a Man-of-War	1850	Richard Bentley	The manuscript was written in New York City during the summer of 1849. In November of that year Melville went to London to dispose of it. Richard Bentley offered £200 for the English rights to print 1000 copies. The manuscript was refused by Murray, Colbour, and Moxon. Finally, in December, Bentley confirmed his previous offer, and accepted the manuscript for publication at the end of March, 1850 (1000 copies). The American Harpers edition came after the English. Reprinted: New York: Harper, 1855; Arthur Stedman, Ed., 1892; 1896.; Boston: Arthur Stedman, Ed., 1900; 1910; 1919.; London: 1855; 1892; 1893; 1901.
Moby-Dick; or, The Whale	1851	Richard Bentley	The manuscript was written at Arrowhead, Massachusetts, in 1850–1851 and was first published in October, 1851. In England Richard Bentley agreed to pay £150 for the first 1000 copies, and half profits thereafter. The American edition (Harpers: 1 volume) is subsequent to the English (3 volumes, 500 copies) and contained thirty-five passages omitted from the English edition. The published price was $1.50. Reprinted: New York: Harper, 1863, Arthur Stedman, Ed., 1892; 1896. Another edition, 1892; 1899; Ernest Rhys, Ed., 1907; 1921. Dodd Mead, 1922.; Boston: Arthur Stedman, Ed., 1900; 1910; 1919.; London: Bentley, 1853; L. Becke, Ed., 1901; Ernest Rhys, Ed., 1907; 1921. Another edition, 1912; Viola Meynell, Ed., 1920; 1921.
Pierre; or, The Ambiguities	1852	Harper & Brothers	The manuscript was written at Arrowhead, Massachusetts, from late 1851 through early 1852 and was first published in August, 1852. Copies issued in England in November of that year consist of the American sheets, with a cancel title = Pierre : Or The Ambiguities. By Herman Melville. London:Sampson Low Son and Co., 47 Ludgate Hill. 1852.
Isle of the Cross	1853	Unpublished	Rejected by Harper & Brothers in June 1853 and since lost or destroyed.
Israel Potter: His Fifty Years of Exile	1855	G. P. Putnam & Co.	Published in April 1855, by Putnam, having previously appeared serially in Putnam's Monthly Magazine, July 1854 – March 1855.) A pirated edition was published under the title The Refugee in Philadelphia: T. B. Peterson, 1865.
The Confidence-Man: His Masquerade	1857	Dix, Edwards & Co.	Published in April, 1857.
Billy Budd, Sailor (An Inside Narrative)	1924	Constable	The heavily revised manuscript is dated April 19, 1891 but Harrison Hayford and Merton Sealts believe Melville probably kept working on it in the months remaining to him, ultimately leaving it unfinished. Raymond Weaver edited the text for its first publication in The Works of Herman Melville (Constable, 1924), and revised it for his edition of the Shorter Novels (Liverlight, 1928). Frederic Barron Freeman produced an edit (Harvard University Press, 1948) so flawed that it had to be accompanied by a Corrigenda prepared by Elizabeth Treeman (Harvard University Press, 1953). Treeman eventually merged her corrections and additional research into Freeman's text, and this Freeman-Treeman version formed the basis for several editions, starting with its appearance in the anthology The American Tradition in Literature (Norton, 1956). Its prevalence declined after Hayford and Sealts produced their "genetic text" along with a reading version for general use (University of Chicago Press, 1962). Most subsequent editions follow this version, which is also the source of the title used here. The Northwestern-Newberry edition of Billy Budd (Northwestern University Press, 2017), in which Harrison Hayford was also involved, offers a revised version of the Hayford-Sealts text that has not so far displaced the original.

== Short stories ==
The publication dates of Melville's stories in no way correspond to their dates of composition; with editorial considerations, such as length vs. amount of space available, usually determining when they would appear. The Piazza Tales was the only collection of Melville's stories published under his direct supervision. The volume sold slowly in spite of generally favorable notices. Its publishers, Dix & Edwards, dissolved their partnership in 1857 and, it appears, paid the author no royalties on either this book or their other published title of his, The Confidence Man. The plates were put up for sale at publishers' auction but attracted no bidders. As one editor said, "no one would risk a dollar on Melville."

The plates were subsequently sold for scrap. In 1922, during the Melville revival, there was a complete resetting of the book for its publication in the Constable edition of Melville's Complete Works. That same year saw the Princeton University Press issue a collection of the remaining known stories under the title The Apple-Tree Table and Other Sketches. The final two stories in the list were discovered in the box turned over to biographer Raymond Weaver by Melville's granddaughter (the same box that yielded Billy Budd) and appeared in the Constable volume titled Billy Budd and Other Prose Pieces.

Title	Publication date	First published in	Notes
"Bartleby, the Scrivener"	November–December 1853	Putnam's Monthly Magazine	Collected in The Piazza Tales (1856)
"Cock-A-Doodle-Doo!"	December 1853	Harper's New Monthly Magazine	Collected in The Apple-Tree Table and Other Sketches (1922) by Princeton University Press, which includes the essay, "Hawthorne and His Mosses" (1850), and contains an introductory note by Henry Chapin. Internet Archive has four versions of the scanned book.
"The Encantadas, or Enchanted Isles"	March–May 1854	Putnam's Monthly Magazine	Collected in The Piazza Tales. Melville received a monthly payment of $50 for each of the three installments for a total of $150. He received no additional payment from the Piazza Tales because the collection never generated any royalties.
"Poor Man's Pudding and Rich Man's Crumbs"	June 1854	Harper's New Monthly Magazine	Collected in The Apple-Tree Table and Other Sketches
"The Happy Failure"	July 1854	Harper's New Monthly Magazine	Collected in The Apple-Tree Table and Other Sketches
"The Lightning-Rod Man"	August 1854	Putnam's Monthly Magazine	Collected in The Piazza Tales
"The Fiddler"	September 1854	Harper's New Monthly Magazine	Collected in The Apple-Tree Table and Other Sketches
"The Paradise of Bachelors and the Tartarus of Maids"	April 1855	Harper's New Monthly Magazine	Collected in The Apple-Tree Table and Other Sketches
"The Bell-Tower"	August 1855	Putnam's Monthly Magazine	Collected in The Piazza Tales
"Benito Cereno"	October–December 1855	Putnam's Monthly Magazine	Collected in The Piazza Tales
"Jimmy Rose"	November 1855	Harper's New Monthly Magazine	Collected in The Apple-Tree Table and Other Sketches
"The 'Gees"	March 1856	Harper's New Monthly Magazine	Collected in The Apple-Tree Table and Other Sketches
"I and my Chimney"	March 1856	Putnam's Monthly Magazine	Collected in The Apple-Tree Table and Other Sketches
"The Apple-Tree Table"	May 1856	Putnam's Monthly Magazine	Collected in The Apple-Tree Table and Other Sketches
"The Piazza"	1856	The Piazza Tales	The only story specifically written for the collection
"The Two Temples"	1924	Billy Budd and Other Prose Pieces	Originally rejected by Harper's because it might offend religious sensibilities, it was subsequently printed from manuscript as a part of Constable's Works, Raymond Weaver editor
"Daniel Orme"	1924	Billy Budd and Other Prose Pieces	First printed in London, Volume 13 of Constable's Works

== Poetry ==
Melville's reputation as a poet rose dramatically in the late 20th century. After the disastrous publication of The Confidence-Man in 1857, Melville turned to the writing of poetry. Virtually ignored by the public and scorned by reviewers, he nevertheless persevered in this endeavor for the next 30 years. Early biographers conveyed the perception of Melville as a novelist who dabbled unsuccessfully in verse. Despite early claims for him as one of the three best American poets before 1900, histories of American poetry for many years all but ignored him. The neglect was partly because until the Northwestern-Newberry edition, the poetry was available only in incomplete "complete" editions, selections, reprints, and editions of individual titles—most of these out of print, few of them textually reliable, and all of them together falling well short of completeness. "That Melville was a poet only in prose is a truth almost universally acknowledged among his critics, one guaranteed to endure as long as the poems remain unavailable in a complete, reliable edition."

In July 2009 Northwestern-Newberry released Published Poems as volume 11 of The Writings of Herman Melville — the most complete collection to date, containing substantial scholarly notes on individual poems. Clarel had appeared earlier as volume 12, while the unpublished poems were included in volume 13, Billy Budd, Sailor and Other Uncompleted Writings. Melville wrote fiction for eleven years, poetry for over thirty. Although it is true he wrote more prose than poetry, the same can be said of Walt Whitman and T. S. Eliot, both of whom wrote less verse than Melville did. With Clarel, he wrote one of the longest poems in the English language. If one includes the poems contained in his novels his entire poetic oeuvre approaches the size of Lord Byron's or Robert Browning's.

=== Collections ===
Title	Date	First publisher	Notes
Poems	1860	Unpublished	Melville tried to have his early collected poems printed in 1860, offering them to two publishers who rejected the work. The contents of the volume were then lost or dispersed into later works.
Battle-Pieces and Aspects of the War	1866	Harper Bros.	1200 copies were printed of which only 486 were sold by February 13, 1868. In the seven years that followed, only eleven additional copies were sold. Published price: $1.75. The book was not issued in England. Melville states that "with few exceptions, the pieces in this volume originated in an impulse imparted by the fall of Richmond..." Of the poems included in this volume, the following had already appeared in magazines: "The March to the Sea," Harper's New Monthly Magazine, February 1866.; "The Cumberland," Harper's New Monthly Magazine, March 1866.; "Philip," Harper's New Monthly Magazine, April 1866.; "Chattanooga," Harper's New Monthly Magazine, June 1866.; "Gettysburg: July, 1863," Harper's New Monthly Magazine, July 1866.; The work was Melville's last commercially funded publication of any sort. He lost $400 on the volume.
Clarel: A Poem and Pilgrimage in the Holy Land	1876	G. P. Putnam's Sons	2 volumes; published price $3.00. The book was not issued in England. Published in July 1876 at the expense of Melville's uncle, Peter Gansevoort. The manuscript had been in existence for some time.
John Marr and Other Sailors	1888	The De Vinne Press	The volume contains 19 poems. The edition was privately printed and limited to 25 copies. Princeton University press issued an edition in 1922 edited by Henry Chapin.
Timoleon	1891	The Caxton Press	The volume contains 43 poems, was privately printed and limited to 25 copies.

=== Single poems ===
- "The Admiral of the White," published in 1885 in both the New York Daily Tribune and the Boston Herald.

=== Uncollected or unpublished in Melville's lifetime ===
- Weeds and Wildings, with a Rose or Two (1924) A book of poems written for his wife and dedicated to her. Unpublished at the time of his death although a fair copy had been made by Elizabeth Melville for the printer. First published in Volume 16 of the Constable edition of Melville's Works (London 1924), then reprinted in a somewhat different order and form in Collected Poems of Herman Melville, Chicago 1947.
- "Epistle to Daniel Shepherd" – first published in Herman Melville: Representative Selections, Willard Thorp, Ed. (New York, 1938).

The following were first published in Collected Poems of Herman Melville, Howard P. Vincent Ed. (Chicago 1947):

- "Inscription for the Slain at Fredericksburgh" [sic]
- "The Haglets" (an expansion of "The Admiral of the White")
- "To Tom"
- "Suggested by the Ruins of a Mountain-temple in Arcadia"
- "Puzzlement"
- "The Continents"
- "The Dust-Layers"
- "A Rail Road Cutting near Alexandria in 1855"
- "A Reasonable Constitution"
- "Rammon"
- "A Ditty of Aristippus"
- "In a Nutshell"
- "Adieu"

== Essays ==
The following essays were uncollected during Melville's lifetime:

- "Fragments from a Writing Desk, No. 1" (Democratic Press, and Lansingburgh Advertiser, May 4, 1839)
- "Fragments from a Writing Desk, No. 2" (Democratic Press, and Lansingburgh Advertiser, May 18, 1839)
- "Etchings of a Whaling Cruise" (New York Literary World, March 6, 1847)
- "Authentic Anecdotes of 'Old Zack'" (Yankee Doodle, II, excerpted September 4, published in full weekly from July 24 to September 11, 1847)
- "Mr Parkman's Tour" (New York Literary World, March 31, 1849)
- "Cooper's New Novel" (New York Literary World, April 28, 1849)
- "A Thought on Book-Binding" (New York Literary World, March 16, 1850)
- "Hawthorne and His Mosses" (New York Literary World, August 17 and August 24, 1850)

== Other ==
- Correspondence, Ed. Lynn Horth. Evanston, IL and Chicago: Northwestern University Press and The Newberry Library (1993). ISBN 0-8101-0995-6
- Journals, Ed. Howard C. Horsford with Lynn Horth. Evanston, IL and Chicago: Northwestern Univ. Pr. and The Newberry Library (1989). ISBN 0-8101-0823-2
