= Arrowhead (Herman Melville House) =

Historic house in Massachusetts, United States

Coordinates: 42°24′55.4″N 73°14′55.7″W

- U.S. National Register of Historic Places
- U.S. National Historic Landmark
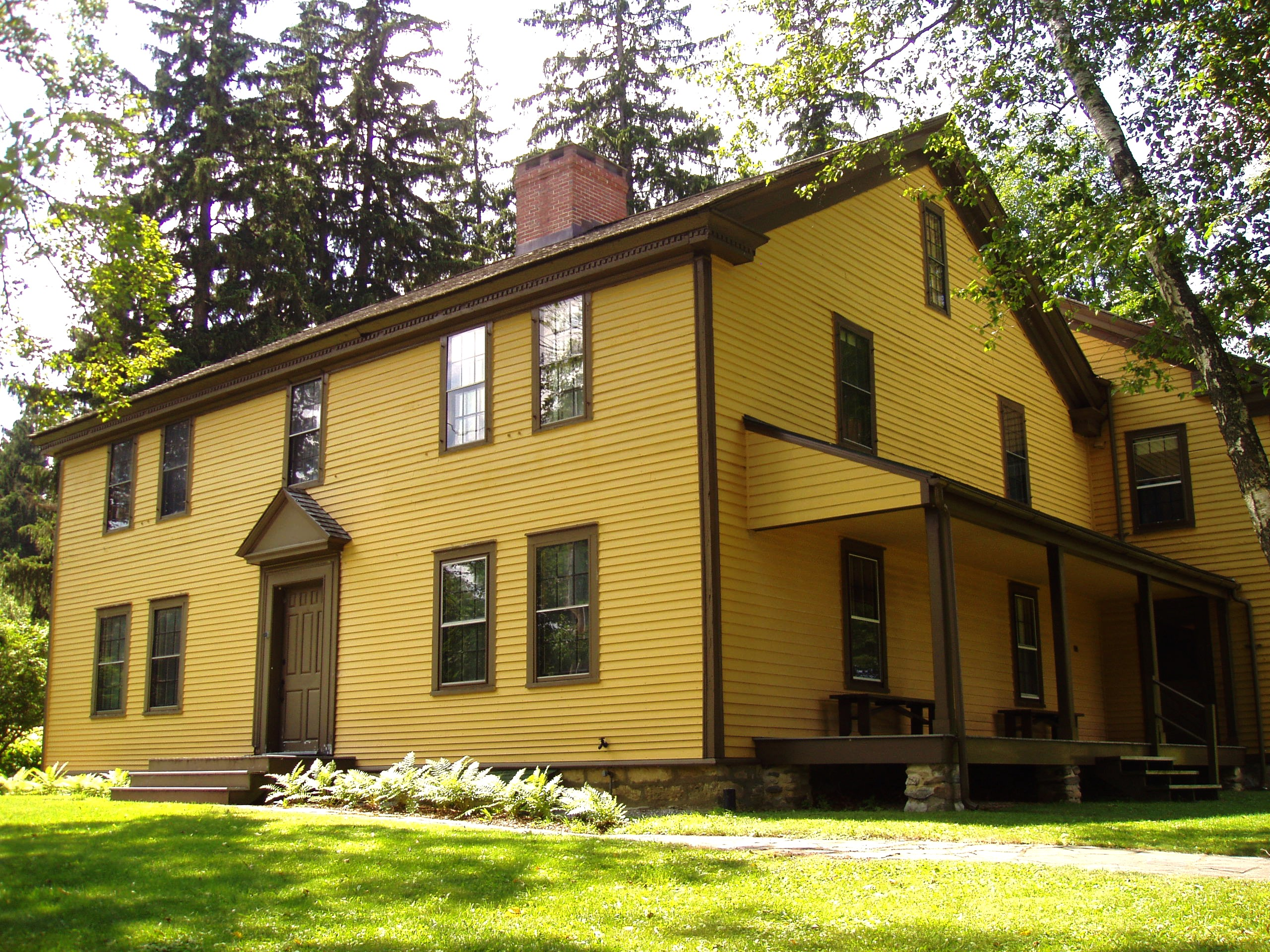
- Arrowhead in 2006; the piazza (porch) is to the right

- Location within Massachusetts Location within the United States
- Interactive map showing the location for Arrowhead
- Location: 780 Holmes Road, Pittsfield, Massachusetts
- Area: 44.909 acres (18.174 ha)
- Built: 1785
- Architect: Capt. David Bush
- NRHP reference No.: 66000126

Significant dates
- Added to NRHP: October 15, 1966
- Designated NHL: December 29, 1962

Arrowhead, also known as the Herman Melville House, is a historic house museum in Pittsfield, Massachusetts. It was the home of American author Herman Melville from 1850 to 1863. Melville wrote several of his major works at Arrowhead, including the novels Moby-Dick, Pierre (dedicated to nearby Mount Greylock), The Confidence-Man, and Israel Potter; The Piazza Tales (a short story collection named for Arrowhead's porch); and magazine stories such as "I and My Chimney."

The house, located at 780 Holmes Road in Pittsfield, was built in the 1780s as a farmhouse and inn. It was adjacent to a property owned by Melville's uncle Thomas, where Melville had developed an attachment to the area through repeated visits. He purchased the property in 1850 with borrowed money and spent the next twelve years farming and writing there. Financial considerations prompted his family's return to New York City in 1863, and Melville sold the property to his brother.

The house remained in private hands until 1975, when the Berkshire County Historical Society acquired the house and a portion of the original 160-acre (65 ha) property. The Society restored most of the house to Melville's period and operates it as a house museum; it is open to the public during warmer months. It has been designated a National Historic Landmark and is listed on the National Register of Historic Places.

== Construction and early history ==
Construction of the oldest portions of the house known as Arrowhead took place in the 1780s. Built by Captain David Bush, the wood frame and clapboard house was apparently used as an inn. The Bush family sold the property to Pittsfield doctor John Brewster in 1844, who in 1850 sold the 160 acres (65 ha) property to the writer Herman Melville. The house at that time consisted of a simple rectangular structure with five window bays across and two deep, with a large central chimney. There is some evidence that the house may originally have had three stories, but at the time of the Melville purchase in 1850, it only had two and a half.

== Melville in Pittsfield ==
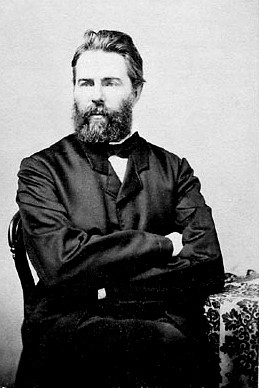
Herman Melville, c. 1860

Herman Melville was born in New York City in 1819. His maternal grandparents lived in Albany, New York, where his parents took their family in 1830 after a series of financial setbacks. His uncle Thomas Melvill owned property in Pittsfield that the family had visited a few times when Melville was younger. The first significant visit Melville made to his uncle was a brief one in August 1831. After his father died in January 1832, Melville's mother took the family to Pittsfield to escape an outbreak of cholera in July 1832. It is from the time of this brief stay that Melville's interest in the Berkshires developed. In 1837 he ran his uncle's farm while the latter traveled to Illinois to pursue business opportunities. According to Melville's cousin Priscilla, during this time his attachment to the area deepened considerably.

In the summer of 1850, Melville, his wife Lizzie, and their son Malcolm vacationed in Pittsfield. The visit to his uncle's farm was bittersweet, for his uncle had agreed to sell the property, and it would be the family's last visit there. On August 5, 1850, Melville met Nathaniel Hawthorne for the first time, having only recently read his short story collection Mosses from an Old Manse. The two were among several invited to a picnic on Monument Mountain south of Pittsfield with a group that also included Evert Augustus Duyckinck and Oliver Wendell Holmes Sr. Melville and Hawthorne struck up an instant friendship. Attracted by the Hawthornes, and apparently unwilling to abandon the Berkshires, Melville decided on impulse to purchase the Brewster farm, which abutted his uncle's property. According to a news report of his purchase, the property "commands one of the most extensive and splended views in Berkshire." He secured a $3,000 loan from his father-in-law Lemuel Shaw (a Massachusetts Supreme Judicial Court Chief Justice who was in Lenox for a court session at the time), received a $1,500 mortgage from Brewster, and promised to pay the rest of the $6,500 purchase price when his New York lease was sold. The sale was finalized on September 14, 1850. To raise funds, Melville sold off 80 acres (32 ha) in the 1850s. Shaw assumed the mortgage in 1856, took title to the property in 1857, and transferred it to Melville's wife in 1860.

== Melville at Arrowhead ==
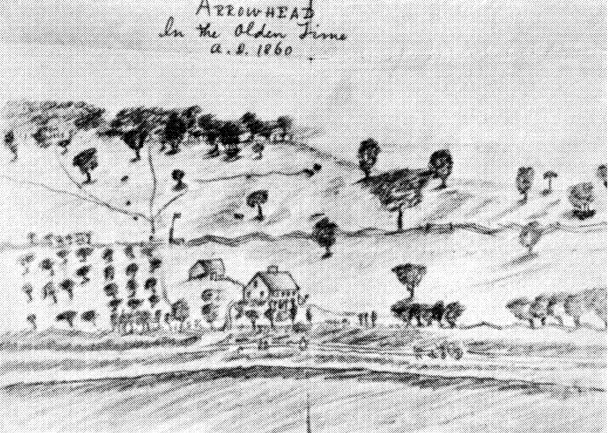
Sketch of Arrowhead estate by Melville, c. 1860

Melville called his new home Arrowhead because of the arrowheads that were dug up around the property during planting season. New York publisher Evert Augustus Duyckinck wrote that its "grounds would satisfy an English nobleman—for the noble maples and elms and various seclusions and outlooks". In August 1850, he described his routine to Duyckinck:

I rise at eight—thereabouts—& go to my barn—say good-morning to the horse, & give him his breakfast. (It goes to my heart to give him a cold one, but it can't be helped.) Then, pay a visit to my cow—cut up a pumpkin or two for her, & stand by to see her eat it—for it's a pleasant sight to see a cow move her jaws—she does it so mildly and with such a sanctity.—My own breakfast over, I go to my work-room & light my fire—then spread my M.S.S. on the table—take one business squint at it, & fall to with a will. At 2 1/2 P.M. I hear a preconcerted knock at my door, which (by request) continues till I rise & go to the door, which serves to wean me effectively from my writing, however interested I may be. My friends the horse & cow now demand their dinner—& I go & give it to them.

It was at Arrowhead that Melville finished his novel Moby-Dick; though the work was not recognized during the author's lifetime, it has since become known as one of the greatest American literary masterpieces. Hawthorne's influence on Melville while writing the book is significant. Melville wrote a review of Mosses from an Old Manse, published by Duyckinck, and in it he believed that these stories revealed a dark side to Hawthorne, "shrouded in blackness, ten times black". Moby-Dick was dedicated to Hawthorne: "In token of my admiration for his genius, this book is inscribed to Nathaniel Hawthorne." Hawthorne, in turn, referenced Melville in his book A Wonder-Book for Girls and Boys: "On the higher side of Pittsfield, sits Herman Melville, shaping out the gigantic conception of his 'White Wale' while the gigantic shape of Graylock [sic] looms upon him from his study-window."

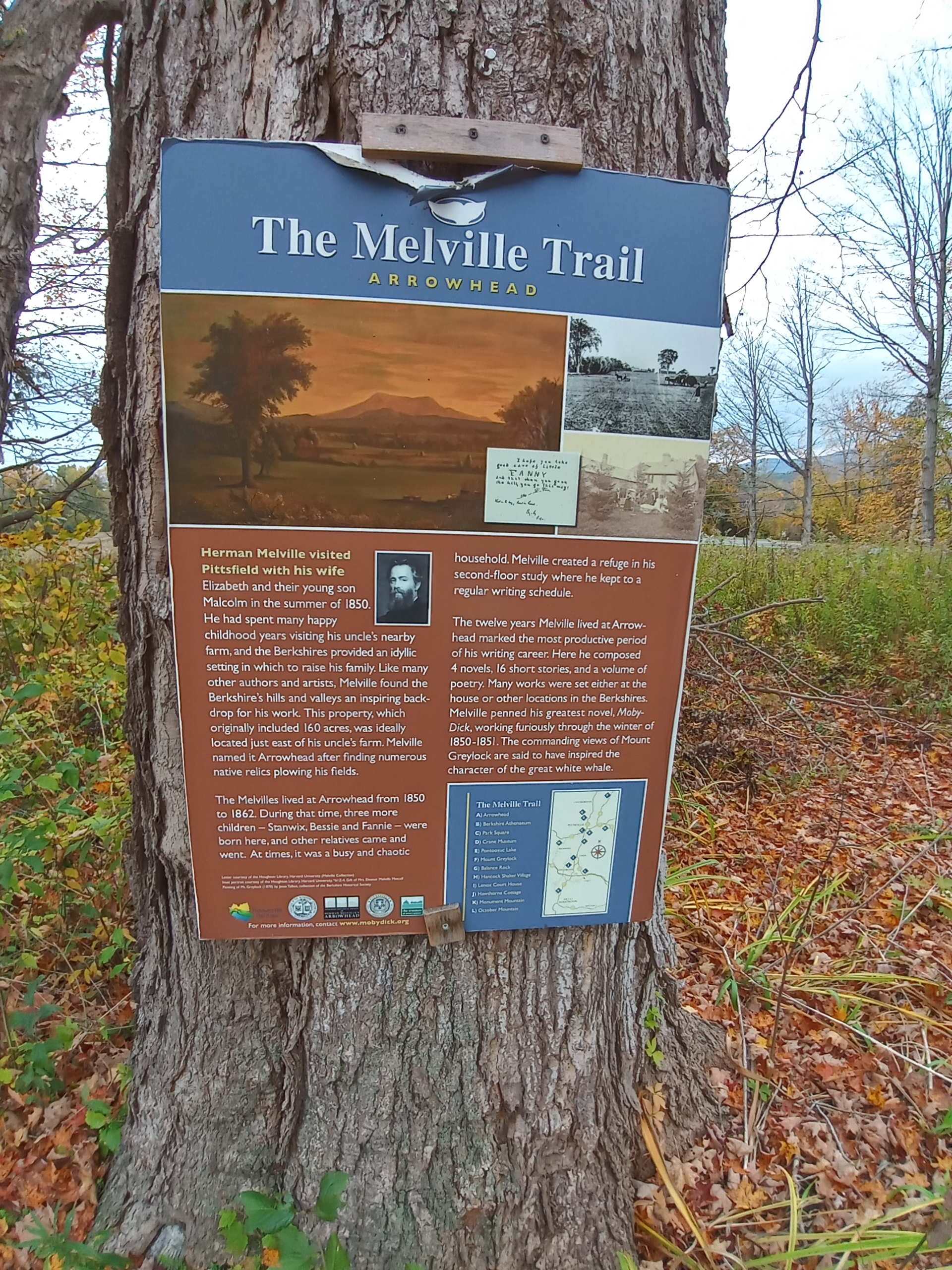
Arrowhead house Melville Trail description

Melville incorporated domestic features of Arrowhead into several stories. The piazza (or porch), after which The Piazza Tales were named, was added to the north side of Arrowhead shortly after Melville purchased the property. Unlike the more typical Berkshires properties that located the porch facing south, Melville chose to face it toward Mount Greylock, to which he dedicated Pierre.

In his short story "The Piazza," he describes a house inspired by Arrowhead, including its initial lack of a piazza and subsequent addition of one:

Now, for a house, so situated in such a country, to have no piazza for the convenience of those who might desire to feast upon the view, and take their time and ease about it, seemed as much of an omission as if a picture-gallery should have no bench; for what but picture-galleries are the marble halls of these same limestone hills?—galleries hung, month after month anew, with pictures ever fading into pictures ever fresh.

In "I and My Chimney", published in Putnam's Monthly Magazine in 1856, he described Arrowhead's large chimney:

It need hardly be said, that the walls of my house are entirely free from fire-places. These all congregate in the middle—in the one grand central chimney, upon all four sides of which are hearths—two tiers of hearths—so that when, in the various chambers, my family and guests are warming themselves of a cold winter’s night, just before retiring, then, though at the time they may not be thinking so, all their faces mutually look towards each other, yea, all their feet point to one centre; and when they go to sleep in their beds, they all sleep round one warm chimney.

Melville lived, farmed, and wrote at Arrowhead for 13 years, receiving visitors including Hawthorne, Holmes, and Catharine Maria Sedgwick. Other well-known works that he wrote there include the novels Israel Potter and The Confidence-Man, and the stories "Bartleby, the Scrivener" and "Benito Cereno" (which were collected in The Piazza Tales). During that time, however, his writing was not providing him much income. In order to improve the family finances, the Melvilles moved into Pittsfield in 1862, and sold Arrowhead the following year to his brother Allan. The Melvilles then returned to New York City, where Herman eventually found work as a customs inspector.

== After Herman Melville ==
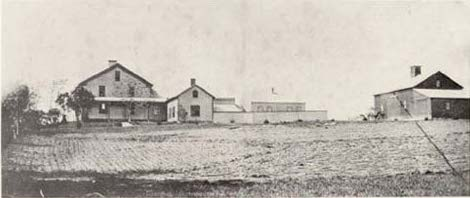
Arrowhead in the 1860s

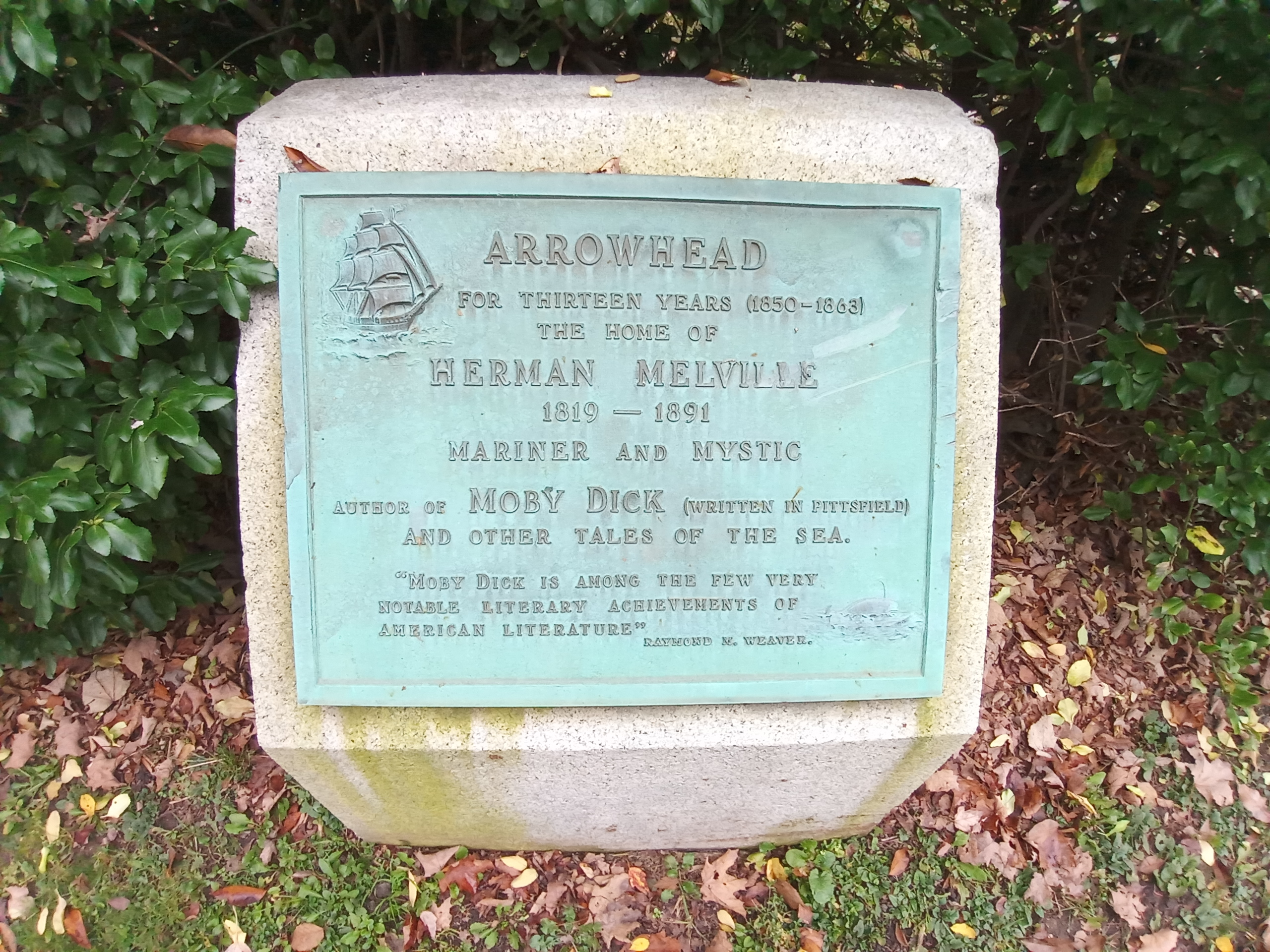
Arrowhead description plaque

Melville continued to visit Arrowhead occasionally during his brother's ownership of the property. Members of the Melville family owned the house until 1927. It remained in private hands until 1975, when the Berkshire County Historical Society purchased the house. In the years between Melville's ownership and the historical society acquisition, major portions of the property were sold off until only 14.2 acres (5.7 ha) remained, although a significant amount of it remains open land; the society later acquired another 30.7 acres (12.4 ha). Owners after Herman Melville made substantial additions to the house, principally two ells. The piazza was removed in the 20th century, but a large window was added on the north side of the house to maintain the view of Mount Greylock. Arrowhead was declared a National Historic Landmark in 1962.

== Museum ==
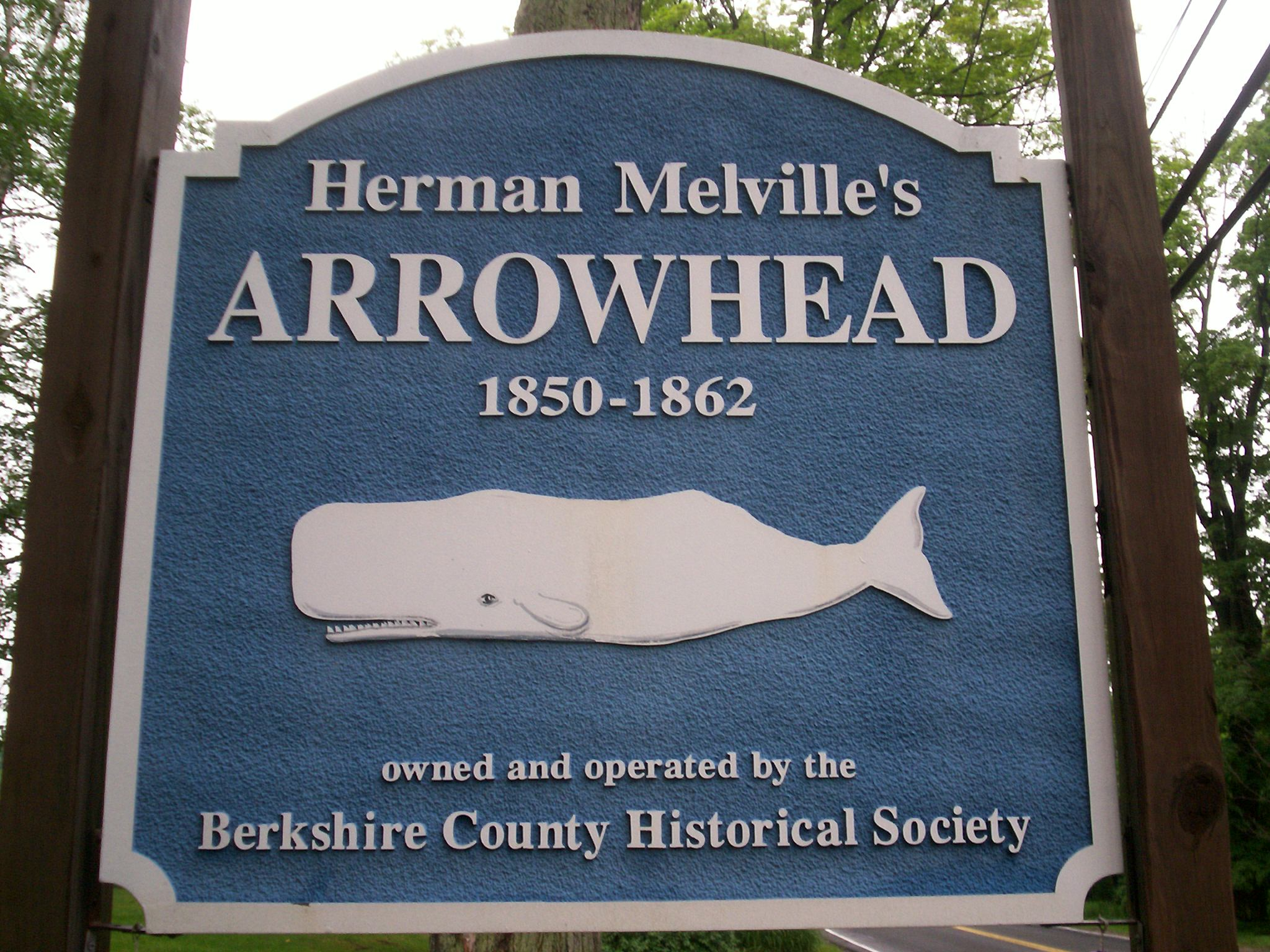
Sign at Arrowhead

The Historical Society, after acquiring the property, worked to restore it to the condition it was in Melville's time. Numerous interior alterations were undone, windows that had been changed were restored to their original size and configuration, and the piazza was restored. The Society also restored the upstairs study in which Melville did his writing to its original state.

Arrowhead is now a non-profit historic house museum operated by the Berkshire County Historical Society, which uses a portion of the house as office space. The remainder is open to the public for guided tours during the warmer months of the year. It is located at 780 Holmes Road, and is open from Memorial Day to Columbus Day.

== See also ==
- Herman Melville House, in Troy, New York, where Melville lived between 1838 and 1847
- National Register of Historic Places listings in Berkshire County, Massachusetts
- List of National Historic Landmarks in Massachusetts
- List of residences of American writers
