= Walter E. Bezanson =

American literature scholar

Walter E. Bezanson (June 19, 1911, in Needham, Massachusetts – February 5, 2011, in Saint Paul, Minnesota) was a scholar and critic of American literature best known for his studies of Herman Melville and contributions to the Melville revival that restored the writer to prominence in the 1940s and 1950s. Bezanson's research and editorial work rescued from neglect Melville's unappreciated epic poem, Clarel, and he published essays on Moby-Dick that were widely cited and reprinted.

He joined the English Department of Rutgers University and taught there for 35 years. He was a founding member and three-time president of the Melville Society, which established the Walter Bezanson Memorial prize in his honor. He was awarded a Fulbright professorship in Belgium and Ford Foundation Faculty Fellowship 1952–1953.

== Early life and career ==
Bezanson graduated from Needham High School in Needham, Massachusetts and received his undergraduate degree from Dartmouth College. He then joined a group of graduate students at Yale University who worked under Stanley Williams, who encouraged them to explore the then neglected works and life of Herman Melville. He left graduate school to become a lieutenant and an instructor in the U.S. Naval Air Force, 1943–46. He was on the aircraft carrier Intrepid off the coast of Japan when the war ended. He taught in the English Department at Harvard for three years, but was attracted to the greater freedom and opportunity to build new programs at Rutgers University, where he taught for the next 35 years.

== Scholarship and criticism ==
=== Clarel ===
Bezanson was in the generation of scholars of the Melville revival who questioned the earlier view that Melville lost interest in writing in the 1850s when his fiction was poorly received. They showed that Melville turned to poetry, which formed the second half of his career.

Clarel was hardly noticed by reviewers or the public when it was published in 1876. The poem is 18,000 lines long and full of now unfamiliar allusions. With verse that is "tight, gnarled, and rugged," says Melville's early biographer Newton Arvin, much of the poem depends on complex allusions to the Bible, history, and geography as well as a play of thought that is "intricate, elusive, [and] sometimes shadowy". Melville's first biographers largely dismissed Clarel because they thought Melville ended his career in the 1850s when his novels were poorly received. Poetry, in that view, was just a hobby, and Melville a genius neglected by crass society. Bezanson and his cohort of scholars in the Melville revival set out to disprove what they saw as this romantic view. Melville scholar and biographer Hershel Parker wrote that among the new generation Bezanson was the scholar who set out to understand Clarel "at a time when no one else alive could make sense of the whole thing. It is the only one of Melville's books that everyone who has now read it was able to read it only because of one person, Bezanson."

Over several decades Bezanson found evidence and developed arguments that Melville based the character Vine on Nathaniel Hawthorne In 1960, Bezanson published the results of his several decades of study in the Hendricks House edition of Clarel, which included extensive notes and annotations. The Introduction is a history and critical study of the work. The review in New England Quarterly praised the edition, saying "Every now and again a book appears that is destined not only to modify previous criticism but also to stimulate renewed interest in a great man and a great work". The edition "rescues Melville from himself" for he made nothing easy for the reader. Newton Arvin, reviewing it in Hudson Review wrote that the "long and searching Introduction" is the "most thorough and penetrating treatment Clarel has ever had."

The 1991 Northwestern-Newberry edition incorporates the Hendrick's House notes along with later findings and prints Bezanson's Introduction intact.

=== Moby-Dick ===
Bezanson's lengthy essay, "Moby-Dick as a Work of Art," delivered in 1951 as a talk at Oberlin College to mark the centennial of the American publication of Moby-Dick, was the first to treat Ishmael as what he called the "enfolding sensibility of the novel, the hand that writes the tales, the imagination through which all matters of the book pass." Most earlier critics had placed Ahab at the center of the work, assuming that Ishmael was merely narrating, rather than struggling with the events as he later recalled them. Bezanson saw two Ishmaels, an earlier Ishmael who witnessed the events, and Ishmael the later writer. The essay was reprinted in the Norton Critical Edition of Moby-Dick in 1961 and in following editions, which Hershel Parker calculated must be more copies than any other academic essay on Moby-Dick. The article is widely cited.

His essay "Moby-Dick: Document, Drama, Dream" further argued "It is the narrator who settles in to probe for understanding, summoning evidences from world culture in an effort to break through into meaning . . . . For Ishmael's struggle with how to tell his tale is under constant discussion, is itself one of the major themes of the book. A modern reader's fascination with Moby-Dick might well begin with attention to Ishmael's search for forms— a sermon, a dream, a comic set-piece, a midnight ballet, a meditation, and emblematic reading. It is as if finding a temporary form would in itself constitute one of those 'meanings' which Ishmael is always so portentously in search of. Also it is as if Ishmael would stop at nothing in his efforts to entertain, to show off, to perform."

His essay "Melville: Uncommon Common Sailor" emphasized Melville's humor and ear for language, writing that his "comic flair no doubt began with temperament, nourished by youth and good health. But the nub of its style came right out of the fisheries, especially the sort of hangman's humor not unlike the black comedy bred by modern wars . . . . Given a temperamental bent toward humor (merely struggling for existence in the pre-Pacific writings), Melville found right here in the whaleboat the perfect incubator for his hyena laugh. It erupts in the sea books; it declines, or perhaps ascends, into subtler ironies in the later years."

== Other Melville scholarship ==
He also supplied the "Historical Note" for the Northwestern-Newberry edition of Israel Potter. Parker remarked that this novel

== Selected publications ==
- ———— (1953). "Moby-Dick: Work of Art". Moby-Dick Centennial Essays: 30–58., reprinted in Harrison Hayford, Hershel Parker, ed., Moby-Dick (Norton Critical Edition, 1sr ed., 1967; 2nd ed.; Hershel Parker, ed., Moby-Dick (Norton Critical Edition, 2019).
- ———— (2015). "Interplanetary Criticism: Notes on Richard Chase's Herman Melville". Leviathan. 17 (2): 132–138. doi:10.1353/lvn.2015.0025. S2CID 141938702. Written in 1953 but not published.
- ———— (1954). "Melville's Reading of Arnold's Poetry". Publications of the Modern Language Association of America. 69 (3): 365–391. doi:10.2307/460065. JSTOR 460065.
- ———— (1954). "Melville's Clarel: The Complex Passion". ELH. 21 (2): 146–159. doi:10.2307/2872021. JSTOR 2872021.
- ————, ed. (1960). Clarel, a Poem and Pilgrimage in the Holy Land. New York: Hendricks House. hdl:2027/mdp.39015005201424. HathiTrust Full Text online
- ———— (1982). "Historical Note". Israel Potter: His Fifty Years of Exile. By Melville. Ed. Harrison Hayford et Al. Evanston, IL: Northwestern University Press and Newberry Library: 173–236.
- ———— (1986). "Moby-Dick: Document, Drama, Dream". In Bryant, John (ed.). A Companion to Melville Studies. Greenwood Press. pp. 169–210.
- ———— (1991). "Historical and Critical Note". Clarel: A Poem and Pilgrimage in the Holy Land. 12: 505–637.
- ———— (1991). Clarel: A Poem and Pilgrimage in the Holy Land. with Harrison Hayford, Hershel Parker, G. Thomas Tanselle, Ed’s. Northwestern University Press. ISBN 9780810109070.
- ———— (1997). "Herman Melville: Uncommon Common Sailor". In Bryant, John; Milder, Robert (eds.). Melville's Evermoving Dawn: Centennial Essays. Kent State University Press. pp. 31–58.
- ———— (1997). Bezanson, Walter; Harrison Hayford; Hershel Parker; G. Thomas Tanselle (eds.). Israel Potter : His Fifty Years of Exile. Evanston, Ill.: Northwestern University Press. ISBN 0810115913.
