= Clarel =

1876 epic poem by Herman Melville

- Author: Herman Melville
- Genre: Epic poem
- Publication date: 1876
- Media type: Print
- Preceded by: Battle-Pieces and Aspects of the War
- Followed by: John Marr and Other Sailors
- Original text: Clarel at English Wikisource

Clarel: A Poem and Pilgrimage in the Holy Land is an epic poem by American writer Herman Melville, originally published in two volumes in 1876. It is a poetic fiction about a young American man named Clarel, on pilgrimage through the Holy Land with a cluster of companions who question each other as they pass through Biblical sites. Melville uses this situation to explore his own spiritual dilemma, his inability to either accept or reject inherited Christian doctrine in the face of Darwin's challenge, and to represent the general theological crisis in the Victorian era.

Clarel is perhaps the longest poem in American literature, spanning 18,273 iambic tetrameter lines (longer even than European classics such as the Iliad, Aeneid and Paradise Lost). As well as for its great length, Clarel is notable for being the major work of Melville's later years. Critics at the time were baffled by its style, which is terse and philosophical, rather than the lyric and poetic style in his better known prose. But Melville has gradually gained a reputation as one of America's great nineteenth-century poets, and Clarel is now acclaimed alongside his prose fiction as one of his great works.

== Plot ==
=== Part One: Jerusalem ===
Clarel, a young American theology student whose Christian beliefs have begun to waver, travels to Jerusalem to renew his faith among some of the sites and scenes of the Old and New Testaments, especially some of the most important places in Jesus's life. He is shocked to see how barren, gray, and often soulless the city seems, with sometimes barely a person to be seen. He stays in a hostel run by Abdon, a Black Jewish man—seemingly a living representation of Jerusalem, but actually an immigrant from India. As Clarel explores the city more and sees greater activity from natives, pilgrims, and tourists, he is initially amazed by the religious diversity there; he sees Jews, Protestants, Catholics, Muslims, Hindus and Buddhists walking its streets and recognizes their common faith in divinity. At one point Clarel exchanges looks with Celio, an Italian youth with lumbago who, as a foundling, was reared too protectively by Catholic monks in a Jerusalem monastery but remained very skeptical of Catholicism. The two young men recognize each other as kindred spirits and realize it would be a good idea to meet, but neither takes the initiative. When Celio dies shortly thereafter, Clarel feels he may have passed up an opportunity to regain his faith.

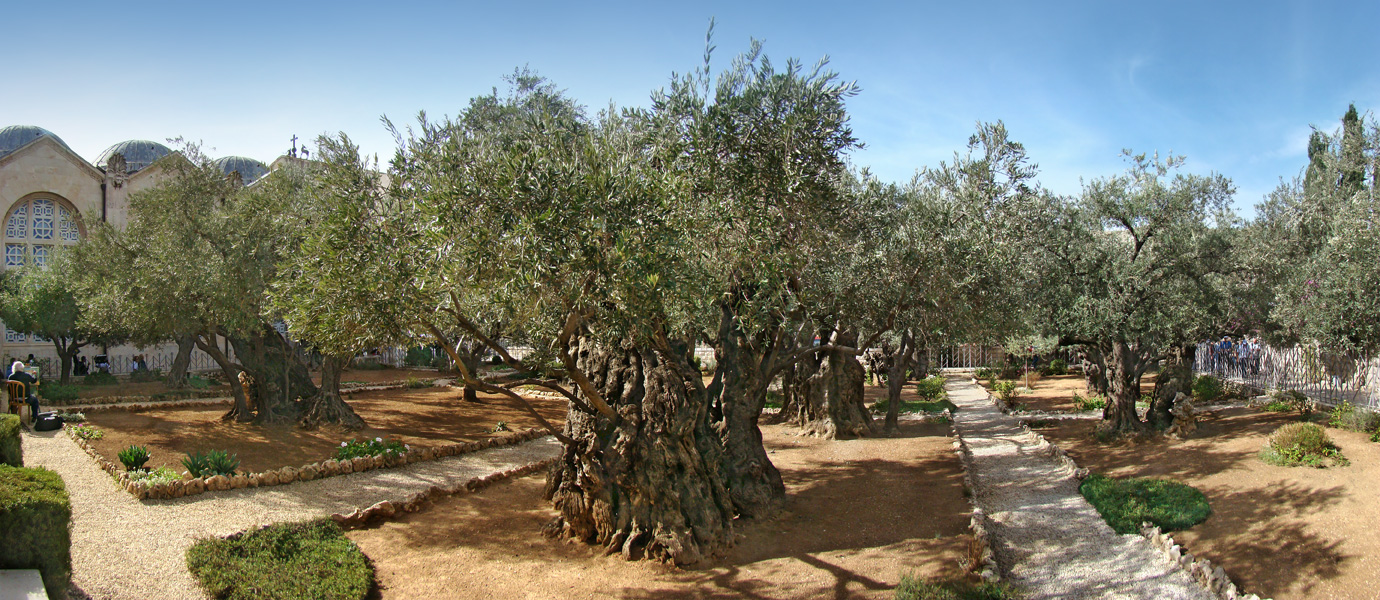
Gethsemane

While walking through Jerusalem's streets, Clarel meets Nehemiah, a humble American Christian given to mysticism who hands out proselytizing tracts to pilgrims and tourists. Having lived and evangelized in Jerusalem for many, many years, Nehemiah immediately takes Clarel under his wing, becoming his sightseeing and spiritual guide around Jerusalem. At the Wailing Wall, Clarel notices Abdon in the crowd as well as an American Jewish man named Nathan and his daughter, Ruth. Nehemiah later introduces Clarel to Ruth, with whom he falls in love. But Nathan's adherence to Jewish custom and the family's jealous rabbi keep Clarel and Ruth apart much of the time, so Clarel continues exploring Jerusalem with Nehemiah. However, Ruth's mother, Agar, approves of the romance.

In Gethsemane, Clarel meets Vine and Rolfe, seemingly almost complete opposites. Rolfe is a talkative, street-smart Protestant and religious skeptic who historicizes Jerusalem and calls into question Jesus's claim to divinity. Vine is an extremely quiet man who seems either to observe completely—his only reaction to some men or situations a strange, silly, or even disturbing look—or to withdraw within himself, distant and lost in thought. However, Vine's example leads Clarel to hope for faith—at least initially. When Vine and Rolfe decide to take a tour of other important sites near Jerusalem—the wilderness where John the Baptist preached and baptized Jesus, the monastery at Mar Saba, and Bethlehem—Clarel wants to accompany them, but he does not wish to leave Ruth.

At this critical juncture, Nathan dies. Jewish customs prohibit Clarel's presence during Ruth and Agar's period of mourning, so the student decides to go on the same pilgrimage Vine and Rolfe will join, confident he will see his beloved when he returns to Jerusalem in a few days. The night before his departure, he sees a frieze depicting the death of a young bride, which makes him pause with foreboding. He banishes his doubts and sets off on his pilgrimage.

=== Part Two: The Wilderness ===
Clarel travels with a range of fellow English-speaking pilgrims, among them Nehemiah, Rolfe and Vine. Other characters appear: Djalea, an emir's son turned tour guide when his people were slaughtered by invaders; Belex, the leader of six armed guards protecting the pilgrims; a wealthy Greek banker and his son-in-law Glaucon; an optimistic Anglican minister named Derwent; an unnamed former elder who has lost the faith; and a Swedish religious seeker and former revolutionist named Mortmain. The tour through the desert starts with an explicit statement that this pilgrimage will be nothing like Chaucer's The Canterbury Tales, for this one has

Nor franklin, squire, nor morris-dance
Of wit and story good as then:
Another age, and other men,
And life an unfulfilled romance.

(II.i.10-14)

Unaccustomed to desert hardships, the banker and his son-in-law soon abandon the group for a caravan headed back to Jerusalem. When Clarel and his companions come to the stretch of road where the good Samaritan reportedly rescued a Jew from robbers, the taciturn elder also departs, scoffing at the cautions of Djalea and Belex, who fear robbers. Mortmain decides not to go with the pilgrims to Jericho, refusing to enter a city he considers wicked. Later they are joined by Margoth, an apostate Jewish geologist who scoffs at the faith expressed by Derwent. Listening to Margoth's atheism prompts Rolfe to move closer to Derwent's faith. The company also speaks briefly with a Dominican friar traveling through the desert.

As the pilgrimage continues, Derwent and Rolfe engage in several heated debates as to the veracity of biblical accounts and the relationship between the various Protestant sects. Derwent staunchly maintains his faith in biblical accuracy, while Rolfe questions the Bible's basis as factual history even as he acknowledges his desire to believe. Clarel eagerly listens to these conversations but rarely participates, unsure of whether his faith is being shored up or torn down by the debates. He seeks Vine out yearning for real intimacy, but Vine's stoic silence resists interpretation, and Vine denies Clarel's request for more open talk.

When the party arrives at the Dead Sea, they make camp, where Mortmain rejoins them. Seeming mentally disturbed, he drinks the salty Dead Sea water despite warnings that it is poisonous. Mortmain survives but, when the pilgrims wake in the morning, they discover Nehemiah has died in the night. He had had a vision of John's heavenly city in the air above the ruins of Sodom and Gomorrah. While the company buries the man by the Dead Sea, Clarel looks out over the water. He sees a faint fogbow, which seems to offer hope as it did for Noah, but in the final two lines of Book II, the bow "... showed half spent— / Hovered and trembled, paled away, and— went."

=== Part Three: Mar Saba ===
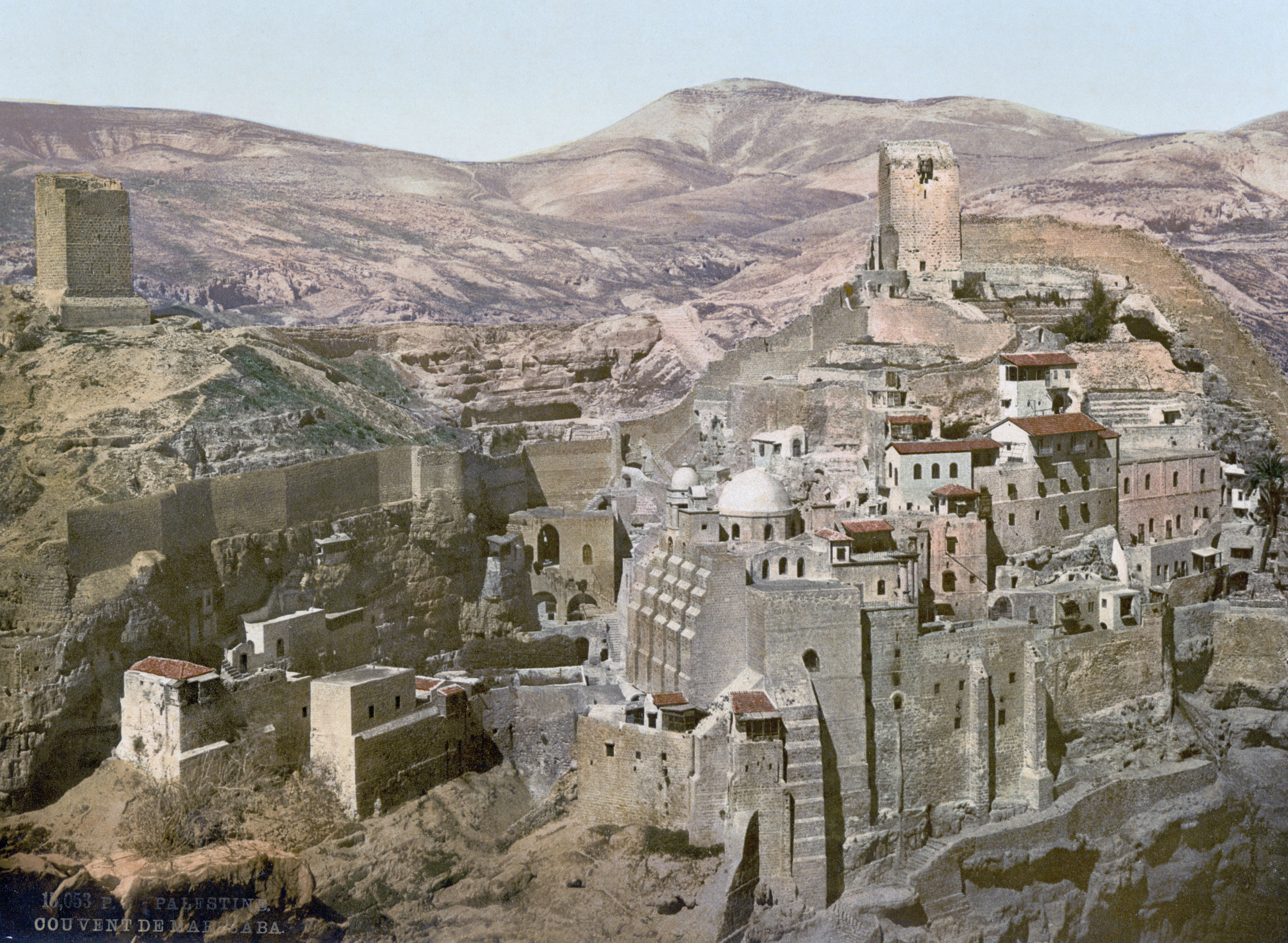
Mar Saba in 1900.

Clarel and the other pilgrims travel to the Greek Orthodox monastery of Mar Saba, where one St. Saba discovered a fountain in the desert and planted a palm tree now more than one thousand years old. On their way to the monastery, they meet a young man from Cyprus who has just left Mar Saba and is traveling to the Dead Sea. The Cypriot's faith is unshaken, and all who hear his singing envy him. On their way to Mar Saba, the travelers pass through the "tents of Kedar", where a band of robbers camp and exact a toll of travelers to the monastery. These robbers recognize Arab royalty in Djalea, however, and let the pilgrims pass without molesting them.

At Mar Saba, Clarel and his friends are fed by the monks and entertained with a masque portraying the story of Cataphilus, a wandering Jew. Hearing Cataphilus described as having lost his faith "and meriteth no ruth", Clarel thinks he resembles the Jew. The monks leave the group with Lesbos, a Muslim merchant visiting the monastery. Lesbos leads the group in a drunken revel, persuading even the staid Derwent to participate. He also introduces the group to Agath, another visitor at Mar Saba, a Greek sailor who was sent to Mar Saba to recover after being attacked in the Judean desert, similarly to the wounded Jew in Christ's parable of the Good Samaritan. Reminiscent of Melville's novels such as White-Jacket and Moby-Dick, Agath and Lesbos tell several sea stories to Clarel, who listens attentively to the tales.

In conversations among the pilgrims and monks, Clarel learns that no one has faith—not Vine, Rolfe, Belex, Lesbos—nor Derwent, whose professions until this point had been staunch. After confessing his lack of faith to Clarel, Derwent takes a tour of the monastery. He cannot appreciate the monks' faith; he scoffs at the holy relics showed him by the abbot, considers several of the monks to be insane, and cannot believe that the holy palm tree is either holy or a thousand years old. When he takes his eyes from the palm, Derwent sees Mortmain's skull cap flutter down from an outcropping where the Jew is observing the palm.

All of the pilgrims fall asleep looking at the palm tree. In the morning, when the caravan is about to leave, Mortmain is missing. They find him on the outcropping, his glassy, dead eyes fixed on the palm tree. The monks bury the Jew outside the monastery, in an unconsecrated grave, "Where vulture unto vulture calls, / And only ill things find a friend."

=== Part Four: Bethlehem ===
When the pilgrims leave Mar Saba, they take Lesbos and Agath with them. After a short distance, Lesbos turns back and returns to the monastery, giving the pilgrims a military salute. Ungar, a new traveling companion, joins the company. A veteran of the American Civil War, he is descended from Catholic colonists and American Indians, and is the only one among them with faith. This new group travels to Bethlehem together. Once in Bethlehem, Agath leaves to join a new caravan. The remaining pilgrims pay Djaleal and Belex for their services in guiding them through the desert.

Ungar's faith attracts Clarel. Derwent is antagonized by his insistence that man is "fallen" and cannot reclaim his lost glory without divine aid. Their debates over human nature and religion reach to the morality of democracy and capitalism. Vine, Rolfe and Clarel, all Americans, take Ungar's part, leaving the Englishman to believe that they argue with him out of prejudice against the Old World.

In Bethlehem, the group is shown the cave where Christ was born by a young Franciscan friar named Salvaterra (save the earth in Italian). He seems almost divine to them, as if he were a reincarnation of St. Francis. The monk inspires Clarel's faith. Clarel's faith is strengthened after his time with Ungar and Salvaterra, and he views the setting sun as an inspiring beacon.

Ungar leaves the group and Salvaterra remains in the monastery, leaving Clarel to grapple alone with his fledgling faith. He returns to Jerusalem hopeful, eager to rescue Ruth and Agar from their exile in Palestine, and return with them both to the United States. As Clarel approaches Jerusalem during the night before Ash Wednesday, he meets a Jewish burial party. In his absence, Ruth and Agar have died. His newfound faith is rocked to its depths. All through the rituals of Holy Week, Clarel waits for a miracle: for Ruth to return from the dead as Christ did. But Easter passes without Ruth's resurrection. Clarel is left a lone man in Jerusalem, wondering why, though "They wire the world—far under sea / They talk; but never comes to me / A message from beneath the stone."

The last canto of Clarel, the epilogue, offers Melville's commentary on the existential crisis of faith suffered by Clarel in the wake of Ruth's death. Though Clarel remains beset by troubles and doubts, Melville offers the poem as an exordium to faith:

"Then keep thy heart, though yet but ill-resigned—

Clarel, thy heart, the issues there but mind;
That like the crocus budding through the snow—
That like a swimmer rising from the deep—
That like a burning secret which doth go
Even from the bosom that would hoard and keep;
Emerge thou mayst from the last whelming sea,

And prove that death but routs life into victory."

== Origins ==
Melville had visited the Holy Land in the winter of 1856 and traveled along the route he describes in Clarel. The visit immediately followed an October trip to England, where he had met his friend Nathaniel Hawthorne, who was U.S. consul in Liverpool. Melville gave Hawthorne his manuscript for The Confidence-Man, which essentially amounted to his "farewell to prose". Hawthorne later recorded his concern about Melville, noting how they

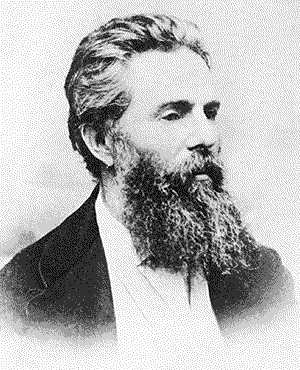
Herman Melville.

took a pretty long walk together, and sat down in the hollow among the sand hills (sheltering ourselves from the high, cool wind) and smoked a cigar. Melville, as he always does, began to reason of Providence and futurity, and of everything that lies beyond human ken, and informed me that he had pretty much made up his mind to be annihilated; but still he does not seem to rest in that anticipation; and, I think, will never rest until he gets hold of a definite belief. It is strange how he persists — and has persisted ever since I knew him, and probably long before — in wandering to and fro over these deserts, as dismal and monotonous as the sand hills amid which we were sitting. He can neither believe, nor be comfortable in his unbelief; and he is too honest and courageous not to try to do one or the other.

Melville's record of the winter voyage of 1856 (15,000 miles for five months), now known as Journal of a Visit to Europe and the Levant, demonstrates that he did not leave behind his doubts or melancholy. Sailing through the Greek Islands, he became disillusioned with classical mythology. He was still in doubt following his time in Jerusalem. Passing Cyprus on the way home, he wrote: "From these waters rose Venus from the foam. Found it as hard to realize such a thing as to realize on Mt. Olivet that from there Christ rose" (p. 164).

Melville explored the divide between the preternatural, the religious, and historical reality; he also was influenced by the crisis faced by mid−19th-century Christianity in the wake of the discoveries of Charles Darwin. Melville saw these scientific developments as simultaneously fascinating (as in the focus on natural history in Moby-Dick) and terrifying, representing a challenge to traditional Christianity that was almost apocalyptic in its significance, especially when combined with the more theological attacks of Protestantism. As he writes in the troubled and inconclusive Epilogue to Clarel:

If Luther's day expand to Darwin's year,
Should that exclude the hope — foreclose the fear?

== Structure ==
The poem is composed in irregularly rhymed iambic tetrameter (except for the Epilogue), and contains 150 Cantos divided into four books: Jerusalem, The Wilderness, Mar Saba, and Bethlehem.

Trying to determine the strange appeal of the work's "detuned poetic style", William C. Spengemann has suggested that the "impacted tetrameters of Clarel" reveal the origin of the "modernist note", and that they thus anticipate the "prosody of Ezra Pound, T. S. Eliot and William Carlos Williams".

Similarly, Walter E. Bezanson notes the "curious mixture of the archaic and the contemporary both in language and materials", leading to the inclusion of antique words such as "kern, scrip, carl, tilth and caitiff", alongside modern technical terms taken "from ship and factory, from the laboratory, from trading, seafaring, and war." Commenting on the rhyme-scheme and the restricted meter, Bezanson responded to the common objection that Melville ought to have composed the work in prose, or at least in blank verse, arguing:

To wish that Clarel had been written in blank verse, for example, is simply to wish for a completely different poem. In earlier years Melville had often set Shakespearean rhythms echoing through his high-keyed prose with extraordinary effect. But now the bravura mood was gone. Melville did not propose a broad heroic drama in the Elizabethan manner. Pentameter -- especially blank verse -- was too ample and overflowing for his present mood and theme. The tragedy of modern man, as Melville now viewed it, was one of constriction... Variations from the basic prosodic pattern are so infrequent as to keep the movement along an insistently narrow corridor.

== Reception ==
=== Contemporary ===
The poem was barely noticed on its original publication, and the few reviews that did appear showed that mainstream critical taste in the United States leaned towards the polished, genteel lines of poets such as Henry Wadsworth Longfellow and James Russell Lowell. The New York Times was the first to insist that "it should have been written in prose", while the reviewer for the World complained that he had gotten "lost in the overwhelming tide of mediocrity". The Independent called it a "vast work... destitute of interest or metrical skill", and Lippincott's Magazine claimed that there were "not six lines of genuine poetry in it". In his collection of these quotes, Walter E. Bezanson suggests that the overwhelmingly negative response was partly due to the fact that none of the critics had "actually read it", noting in particular the Lippincott critic's baffling comment that the poet was evidently a "bright and genial" individual, an observation entirely out of keeping with the tone of the vast majority of the work.

Bezanson adds that Melville's "effort to cope with the major tensions of an age makes Clarel a historical document almost of the first order." He concedes that present day readers may be "baffled" by the poetic style, but "[o]nce we face up to the idea that Melville's poetry is not an extension of the lyric vein of his famous novels," we can accept that "essentially he was drawn to a non-lyrical, even harsh, prosodic line.

=== Early 20th century ===
Subsequent criticism, especially since the so-called "Melville Revival" of the early-20s, has been more positive about the poem. Frank Jewett Mather called it "America's best example of Victorian faith-doubt literature", and Raymond Weaver declared that it contained "more irony, vividness and intellect than almost all the contemporary poets put together." In 1924, amid the rising tide of literary modernism, the British critic John Middleton Murry approvingly noted the "compressed and craggy" quality of Melville's poetic line, and the French critic Jean Simon found "an extraordinary revelation of a tormented soul" in the work, but noted that the two volumes of the poem represented two essentially distinct spiritual crises.

=== Post-World War II ===
Seeing the whole work as an obscure elder sibling to T. S. Eliot's The Waste Land, literary scholar Richard Chase has argued that the "sterility of modern life is the central symbolic idea of the poem", and that, after the "extremities of titanism in Pierre", Melville reached the culmination of his later thought: "the core of the high Promethean hero". These remarks paved the way for a generation of critics who saw the poem as the crucial document of Melville's later years, such as Ronald Mason, who reads the poem as "a contemplative recapitulation of all Melville's imaginative life", and Newton Arvin, who calls it "Melville's great novel of ideas in verse". Melville's centennial epic is also his most direct commentary on the era of Reconstruction.

In 1994, Harold Bloom chose Clarel as one of four Melville works to discuss in his book The Western Canon.

== References and further reading ==
- Bezanson, Walter E. (1991). "Historical and Critical Note". In Hayford, Harrison; McDougall, Alma A.; Parker, Hershel; Tanselle, G. Thomas (eds.). Clarel: A Poem and Pilgrimage in the Holy Land. The Writings of Herman Melville 12. Evanston, Illinois: Northwestern University Press. pp. 505–637. Reprinted and slightly updated from the 1960 Hendricks House edition. Includes a "Critical Index of the characters" that briefly identifies and gives critical analyses. (pp. 613–635)
- Hutchins, Zachary McLeod (2017), "Clarel, Canto-by-Canto", Leviathan, 19 (3): 7–35, doi:10.1353/lvn.2017.0032, S2CID 201776703
- Clarel: a Poem And Pilgrimage In the Holy Land. Edited, with an Introduction by Walter E. Bezanson. (New York: Hendricks House, 1960). HathiTrust Digital Library (searchable full view).
- Melville, Herman (1991). Clarel: A Poem and Pilgrimage in the Holy Land. Evanston, Illinois: Northwestern University Press and The Newberry Library. ISBN 9780810109070. Text of the 1876 first edition with corrections from a copy marked by Melville. Historical Note by Walter Bezanson reprinted from the 1960 Hendricks House edition and extensive notes on Biblical, historical, and literary allusions.
- Vendler, Helen (1992). "Desert Storm: Clarel: A Poem and Pilgrimage in the Holy Land". The New Republic. Vol. 207, no. 24. pp. 39–42. Review of the Northwestern-Newberry edition.
