= I and My Chimney =

1856 short story by Herman Melville

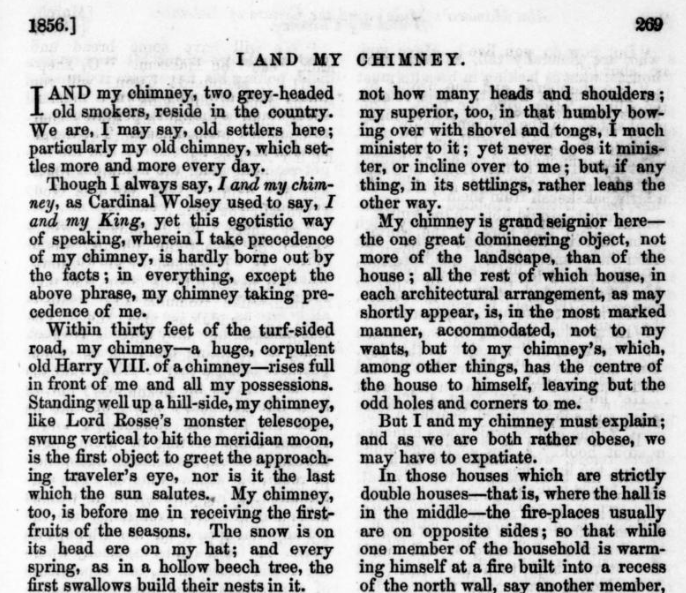
"I and my Chimney" as it first appeared in Putnam's

"I and My Chimney" is a short story written by Herman Melville and published in the March 1856 issue of Putnam's Magazine. In the story, the narrator feels a kinship to the large chimney in his country house. His wife wants to remove or renovate the chimney, but the narrator does not want this. A mason gives him an estimate for dismantling the chimney, and suggests that it contains a hidden compartment. The narrator bribes the mason to give him a certificate saying that there are no problems with the chimney. To make sure the chimney stays as it is, the narrator decides never to leave the house.

Literary critics have interpreted the story in multiple ways. Some, notably Merton Sealts, see the story as a thinly veiled autobiographical story, where the narrator is a stand-in for Melville, and his chimney is his mental illness. Other critics see the chimney as a symbol of masculinity and the status of patriarchy in the home in the 1850s. Other critics focus on the meaning of written language in the story and the possible political metaphors in the story.

== Summary ==
An unnamed narrator compares himself to his chimney. He feels overshadowed by his chimney's presence, and that his home's architecture conforms to the chimney's (not his) requirements. He praises his pyramid-shaped chimney and recounts its history. After a renovation to the home, the chimney was shortened, which made it wider at the top. Parts of the chimney that were on the interior were exposed to the elements and had to be replaced. The narrator boasts that the central positioning of his hearth is superior to houses which have separate chimneys on either side of the house, because a central hearth encourages unity. His wife wants to remove the chimney to create a great hall in their house, which prompts the narrator to reflect on his relationship with his wife. While he is content to let things be, she sees everything as a problem to be fixed. While she is energetic and curious about new ideas, he is bent with pain and prefers the company of old things.

The narrator remarks that the way the rooms center on the chimney made for a disorienting floorplan. A passing master mason named Hiram Scribe told him that the chimney took up more room than was necessary and was a waste of floor space, and offered to dismantle it for 500 dollars. The narrator's wife and daughter were eager to see the chimney gone, but the narrator resolved that the chimney should stay. Hiram sends the narrator a note revealing that there is likely a hidden closet in the chimney. The narrator recalls that his relative Julian Dacres originally built the home. Julian was a shipmaster, who everyone assumed had amassed a large fortune, but died in debt. He tells Julian that his chimney will remain, and signs his name "I and my chimney." His wife persists in asking about the secret closet, and the narrator has Scribe come again. Scribe finds a discrepancy in the measurements of the chimney and the rooms on the second floor. The narrator pays him fifty dollars to sign a statement saying that he has no reason to believe that the chimney is unsound. The narrator's wife persists in her desire to remove the chimney and discover the secret closet. The narrator becomes a recluse to ensure that the chimney is safe.

== Origins ==
Several literary critics describe the story as autobiographical. The chimney in the story is based on Melville's chimney at Arrowhead. An inscription on the chimney at Arrowhead reads "I and my chimney smoke together," a line that the narrator repeats in the story. Allan, Herman's brother, added the line to the chimney sometime before 1870. A note from Melville's wife shows that she believed that the character of the wife in the story was based on Herman's mother.

"I and My Chimney" was published in Putnam's March 1856 issue. Putnam's was a magazine aimed at middle-class men which published articles that argued against women's suffrage and analyzed popular architectural changes.

== Literary analysis ==
=== Autobiographical interpretation ===
The narrator, a stand-in for Melville, identifies with the chimney. The narrator equates the "secret closet" of the chimney with weakness in the chimney. Merton Sealts argues that this represents Melville's fear of mental illness. He bases this argument on a similar situation in Pierre, where all of the protagonist's immediate relatives have bouts of mental instability. Melville's father died at a time of mental instability. The narrator in "I and My Chimney" says that "to break into [the wall of the hidden closet created by my kinsman], would be to break into his breast." Sealts wrote that the ancestor who built the chimney, Darces (an anagram for sacred), was "based on memories of the unfortunate Allan Melville", who had issues of anxiety and delirium before his death. In 1853, Herman's family had him examined for insanity. Sealts suggests that the neighbor physician who helped to examine Herman, Dr. Oliver Wendell Holmes, could have been the basis for Scribe, the mason who certifies the chimney. While he was pronounced sane, Sealts argues that this provides an autobiographical kernel for "I and My Chimney": "it is Melville's account of the examination of his mind made a few years before the story was written, at the instigation of his family." Sealts's article is considered the start of modern critical analysis of the story, and his autobiographical reading was popular with many critics. In 1960, Stuart Woodruff took issue with Sealts's interpretation, stating that it "freezes the story into an allegorical mode of limited thematic value."

=== Chimney as symbol of masculinity ===
The narrator in the story has specific ideas about architecture which align well with Hawthorne's support of conservative patriarchal familial ideals. Edward Rosenberry noticed this in 1970. Writing in 1977, Ann Douglas saw the chimney as "a bastion of phallic, assertive, and aggressive masculinity." More recently, John Allison more further explored this link in his 1996 article on conservative architecture in the story. The narrator states that the chimney represents "the God" of the "fathers" and refers to it as a "magnitude" that receives "the first fruits". These and other descriptors position the chimney as traditional patriarchal values made manifest through architecture. For Allison, Melville's value ultimately resides in "the ego's capacity to project sentiment, significance, and wonder." Also writing in 1996, Milette Shamir discussed "I and My Chimney" alongside works of Hawthorne as domestic fiction written by men on the role of the home in middle-class American culture. Shamir sees the story as expressing anxiety that the domain of the household is being taken over by women and is no longer shared with men. The renovations that the narrator's wife and daughter wish to make were part of a mid-19th-century fashion to change traditional farmhouses into trendy suburban retreats. Thus, the narrator's resistance to this change is intertwined with his love of rural life and the change of family culture from patriarchal to middle-class bourgeois. The narrator's wife seeks to create a "grand entrance-hall" through the space the chimney occupies, reducing the amount of enclosed rooms in the home. The narrator sees this as an attack on his privacy, a "masculine prerogative". This is further dramatized in Scribe's discovery of a secret closet in the chimney, which the wife wishes to uncover, but the narrator seeks to keep concealed. In order to retain his control over the home, the narrator stays home all the time, relinquishing his role in public life, but retaining his privacy. Shamir sees the story as a defense of Melville's "masculine aesthetic of concealment," articulated by William Charvat, where the relationship between the author's fiction and his reality is concealed.

Writing in 1962, E. Hal Chatfield saw the story as one where old age, represented by the narrator and the chimney, strives to "'hold its own' against the exhaustive energy of youth." Chatfield acknowledges that Freudian readers would see the chimney as a phallic image, with the wife's desire to remove the chimney symbolizing demasculinization.

Melville's interest in architecture as congruent with a time period in the mid-19th-century when affordable building techniques became popular and designers like Andrew Jackson Downing created patterns for new kinds of houses which reinforced the division of genders into separate spaces in the home. Writing in American Literature in 2004, Sarah Wilson noticed that the narrator in "I and My Chimney" opposed the Downing-like renovation because it would isolate members of the household. The original configuration, while confusing, because it lacks corridors, requires family members to intrude on other family members' spaces, building community through routes of "communication and circulation". Downing's designs, on the other hand, created spaces for uninterrupted, gender-segregated work that joined a controlled space in a corridor.

=== Semiotic interpretation ===
Writing on the same topic in 2009, Katja Kanzler posited that in addition to signaling the cultural decline, the narrator's defense of his home's chimney works on another level: to highlight an instability of signification (Semiotics). Initially, the chimney seems to represent a central pillar of the home, but later is found to diffuse the home's structure. Through this change, the things that that the chimney represents (which critics have argued can constitute many different things) are also meant to be diffused. Kanzler sees the narrator's position not as reflecting Melville's own thoughts, but as reflecting more complex ideas through layers of symbolism. While initially, the narrator asserted that the chimney was a central ordering feature of his home, his later description of the organization of rooms as confusing and labyrinthine (because they must accommodate the chimney) leads readers to understand that the chimney is a destabilizing force. The chimney's change in role (its "loss of semiotic authority") is congruent with the narrator's "loss of material authority". Writing, in letters and figures, becomes central in Mr. Scribe's interactions with the narrator, and both use writing to attempt to gain authority over the chimney. The narrator bribes Mr. Scribe to write a certificate stating that the chimney is sound, but it does not provide the closure that the narrator hopes for. Writing is shown to be only a "surrogate of reality" and a "commodity" which undermines the persuasive power of writing. Kanzler also expresses the idea that the chimney does not merely symbolize the narrator's identity, but constitutes it.

=== Political interpretation ===
Allan Moore Emery wrote on the story's political significance in 1982. He saw the chimney as representing a unified federal Union, with the narrator's deprecation of having two chimneys in the same house representing the view of splitting the United States into Northern and Southern halves, an opinion shared by William Soder, who first wrote on the topic in 1963. Emery found a more specific parallel to the narrator in Daniel Webster, a New England politician who, like the narrator, could speak at length about the importance of the constitution (chimney). With this reading, it is possible to see the narrator's wife as a progressive abolitionist whose primary political motivator is to fight male domination of politics. The narrator's concession that the chimney was not particularly efficient and caused many convolutions in the home's architecture could signify that Melville was dissatisfied with the current federal government, and the trend of subordinating the self to the interests of the state.

== Legacy ==
Milie, a daughter of Allan, Herman Melville's brother, wrote her diary in 1869 from the point of view of the chimney, a likely homage to Herman's story.

== Works cited ==
- Allison, John (1996). "Conservative Architecture: Hawthorne in Melville's "I and My Chimney"". South Central Review. 13 (1): 17–25. doi:10.2307/3189911. ISSN 0743-6831. JSTOR 3189911.
- Chatfield, E. Hale (1962). "Levels of Meaning in Melville's "I and my Chimney"". American Imago. 19 (2): 163–169. ISSN 0065-860X. JSTOR 26301861.
- Douglas, Ann (1977). The Feminization of American Culture. Alfred A. Knopf. ISBN 0394405323.
- Emery, Allan Moore (1982). "The Political Significance of Melville's Chimney". The New England Quarterly. 55 (2): 201–228. doi:10.2307/365359. ISSN 0028-4866. JSTOR 365359.
- Kanzler, Katja (2009). "Architecture, Writing, and Vulnerable Signification in Herman Melville's "I and My Chimney"". Amerikastudien / American Studies. 54 (4): 583–601. ISSN 0340-2827. JSTOR 41158466.
- Parker, Hershel (2002). Herman Melville: a biography. Volume 1, 1819-1851. Vol. 1: 1819-1851. Baltimore (Md.) London: the Johns Hopkins university press. ISBN 0801868920.
- Parker, Hershel (2002). Herman Melville: a biography. Volume 2, 1851-1891. Vol. 2: 1851-1891. Baltimore (Md.) London: the Johns Hopkins university press. ISBN 0801868920.
- Sealts, Merton M. (May 1941). "Herman Melville's "I and My Chimney"". American Literature. 13 (2): 142–154. doi:10.2307/2921107. JSTOR 2921107.
- Shamir, Milette (1996). "Divided Plots: Interior Space and Gender Difference in Domestic Fiction". Genre. 29.
- Sowder, William (1963). "Melville's "I And My Chimney": A Southern Exposure". The Mississippi Quarterly. 16 (3): 128–145. JSTOR 26473482.
- Wilson, Sarah (2004). "Melville and the Architecture of Antebellum Masculinity". American Literature. 76 (1): 59–87. doi:10.1215/00029831-76-1-59.
- Woodruff, Stuart C. (1960). "Melville and His Chimney". PMLA. 75 (3): 283–292. doi:10.2307/460339. ISSN 0030-8129. JSTOR 460339.
