= Battle-Pieces and Aspects of the War =

1866 poetry book by Herman Melville

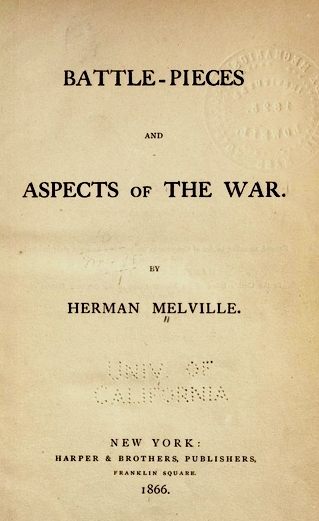
- Author: Herman Melville
- Genre: Poetry
- Published: 1866 Harper & Brothers, New York
- Publication place: United States
- Preceded by: The Confidence-Man
- Followed by: Clarel

Battle-Pieces and Aspects of the War is the first book of poetry of the American author Herman Melville. Published by Harper & Brothers of New York in 1866, the volume is dedicated "To the Memory of the Three Hundred Thousand Who in the War For the Maintenance of the Union Fell Devotedly Under the Flag of Their Fathers" and its 72 poems deal with the battles and personalities of the American Civil War and their aftermath. Also included are Notes and a Supplement in prose in which Melville sets forth his thoughts on how the Post-war Reconstruction should be carried out.

The book had sold only 486 copies by 1868 and recovered barely half of its publications costs and critics at the time were at best respectful and often sharply critical of Melville's unorthodox style. The critical opinion on Battle-Pieces did not change until the latter half of the 20th century, when scholars began to re-evaluate it as worthy of praise and attention.

== Background ==
The book is Melville's return to poetry after a hiatus which began in 1860 when Harper & Brothers turned down a book of his poems, which is now lost. After moving his family from Massachusetts to New York in 1863, Melville contemplated writing a book of poems on the war, but evidently did not begin to do so until 1864. The book was not published until 1866, a year after the end of the war. The title refers to the familiar paintings by Dutch and British artists who depicted scenes of battle at sea and musical settings of these battles. Melville's major source for the poems were the early volumes of Frank Moore's (compiler) eleven-volume The Rebellion Record: A Diary of American Events, with Documents, Narratives, Illustrative Incidents, Poetry, Etc. (New York:G.P. Putnam, 1861–1868).

== Poems ==
Battle-Pieces is made up of 72 short lyric and narrative poems grouped into two sections. The first and longer sequence is composed of 52 poems that portray the history of the war, starting with John Brown's hanging in "The Portent" and ending with an account of the Confederate surrender in "The Surrender at Appomattox." It is centered on battles with a special emphasis on the personalities of the officers who led them. The second, shorter series of 16 poems is titled "Verses Inscriptive and Memorial" and is made up of elegies, epitaphs, and requiems. Three final poems, "The Scout Toward Aldie," "Lee in the Capitol," and "A Meditation," do not fall into either section.

The poems in this collection utilize a wide variety of poetic forms and meters. However, they are united by a series of recurring symbols, such as the river, bird, meteor, and Dome. Melville also utilizes Miltonic imagery and references to Paradise Lost in several poems such as "The Conflict of Convictions" and "The Canticle."

== Prose supplement ==
The Supplement in prose is Melville's meditation on the period after the Civil War, now known as the Reconstruction Era. As the scholar Robert L. Gale summarizes, "Melville urges Christian charity and common sense with respect to Reconstruction efforts, a wide and humane patriotism, an awareness that victory came to the North not by greater heroism but because of greater resources and population, sympathy for the liberated slaves, and decency in Congress."

In the prose "Supplement", Melville says that he is "one who never was a blind adherent" and advocates reconciliation with the South. He does not favor enfranchising former slaves immediately, for they are "in their infant pupilage to freedom" and argues that sympathy for them "should not be allowed to exclude kindliness to communities who stand closer to us in nature". He continues, "Let us be Christians toward our fellow-whites, as well as philanthropists toward the blacks, our fellow-men."

== Critical response ==
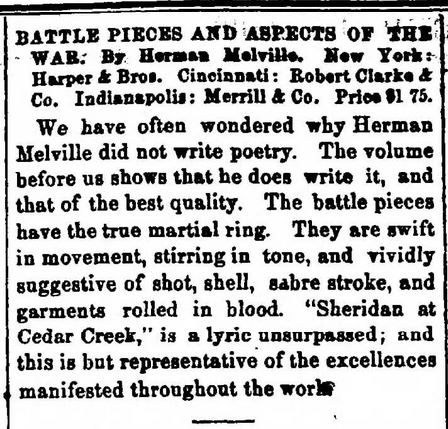
Contemporary review in the Indianapolis Daily Journal

The initial reception in the major journals was sympathetic but not entirely approving. Richard Henry Stoddard, for instance, wrote

The habit of his mind is not lyric, but historical, and the genre of historic poetry in which he most congenially expatiates finds rhythm not a help but a hindrance. The exigencies of rhyme hamper him still more, and against both of these trammels his vigorous thought habitually recalcitrates.... That it is not the nature of his thought which is at fault, may be plainly perceived from multitudes of strong and beautiful images, many thoughts picturesquely put, which, belonging legitimately to the poetic domain, still refuse to obey the rigid regimental order of the stanza, but outly its lines, deployed as irregular, though brilliant skirmishers....

Stoddard also found it

a book which, without having one poem of entire artistic ensemble in it, possesses numerous passages of beauty and power. For these it is well worth going through, and belongs, at any rate, to a place on the shelves of those who are collecting the literature of the war, as well as of that much larger class who would not be without a book of Typee's gifted author.

More recent critics praise Melville's poetry in general and Battle-Pieces in particular. Lawrence Buell writes that, next to Walt Whitman, Melville wrote the best series of Civil War lyrics. He also notes that Melville wrote from a Yankee viewpoint but that Battle-Pieces seldom voices jingoism or triumphalism.

== Academic analysis ==
Melville's poetry and politics in Battle-Pieces have been analyzed by literary scholars. Much of the literature on the poems in Battle-Pieces suggests that they urged moderation and an amicable reconstruction. The poetry includes references to contemporary and classical works and also shows Melville's novelistic inclinations.

Jamie Fenton sees John Brown, as depicted in "The Portent," as a Launcelot in the mode of Alfred, Lord Tennyson's "The Lady of Shalott." Fenton also acknowledges the likely influences of Whitman, Shakespeare, Thoreau, and others upon Melville but emphasizes the Tennyson connection as imbuing "a productive irony." In Fenton's reading of Melville, a romantic or poetic reading of history makes an already painful reunification more difficult. Therefore, the poem uses the content and themes of a ballad in a distinctly non-romantic way in order to warn of the war related in the volume as well as the difficulties of peace.

Vanessa Meikle Schulman argues that Melville's repeated emphasis in Battle-Pieces on soldiers who lost limbs or were visibly wounded mirrors a trend of post-Civil War Americans rhetorically using the language and practice of healing and treating both Northern and Southern veterans as a way to try to heal social and political rifts. Schulman also writes that "The poetic structure of Battle-Pieces presents a fractured and incomplete narrative that mirrored the sense of fragmentation many postwar Americans felt." For Schulman, therefore, Melville's usage of structure, symbolism, and subject all contribute to a focus on both wounded soldiers and the wounded nation.

Mustafa Jalal wrote an analysis of Melville's shift from novelist to poet as shown in Battle-Pieces. Jalal referred to Melville's poetic style in the collection as "a fundamentally polyphonic or dramatic poetry which adopts, as its basic technique, the creation of characters and dramatic voices." Coming in for particular attention is the poem "The Conflict of Convictions" which takes the form of a dialectic between "Yea" and "Nay" and that culminates in what Jalal calls "the voice of the poem itself" that in between the two poles creates "a precarious balance." This characteristic usage of dialog and characterization to flesh out verse Jalal described as Melville's "protean capacity" and telltale novelistic sensibilities.

"A Utilitarian View of the Monitor's Fight" has also attracted attention, particularly in conversation with the other naval poems in the Battle-Pieces collection. Tommy Jamison, in Technology and Culture, wrote that "Melville's poem had identified a raw nerve: materiality was ascendant in the industrial age, displacing... naval manhood." Jamison further identifies "A Utilitarian View" as a useful prism through which to view the anxieties around the industrialization of sea power and maritime commerce. Similarly, Leo B. Levy in American Literature read "A Utilitarian View," "Temeraire," "The Cumberland," and "In The Turret" as containing intentional intertextualities with an 1862 essay by Nathaniel Hawthorne, "Chiefly About War-Matters," reacting to the Battle of Hampton Roads and elegizing the utility of non-armored vessels. Levy wrote that the Melville poems and the Hawthorne essay have a "convergence of aim" that "is not surprising" when one considers their mutual literary ties. Essays in Arts and Sciences carried a piece by Edward Stessel that connected Melville's mourning of the age of wooden ships to his critical and commercial failures in the 1850s and 1860s. Stessel wrote of Melville's Monitor poems that they reflect the poet's "mourning of his new obsolescence" and an identification of "the wooden ships" with "his time of promise." This makes the poetic quality of "A Utilitarian View of the Monitor's Fight"—Stessel identified it as the best of the grouping—very interesting. In Stessel's view, it underlines the pathos of the naval motifs as reflections of Melville and his career.

== Editions ==
- Melville, Herman (2001). Battle-Pieces and Aspects of the War: Civil War Poems. Amherst, NY: Prometheus Books. ISBN 1573928933. foreword by James M. McPherson; introduction by Richard H. Cox and Paul M. Dowling; interpretive essays by Helen Vendler et al.
- —— (2009). Robert Ryan (ed.). Published Poems. The Writings of Herman Melville The Northwestern-Newberry Edition Volume 11. Evanston, Il: Northwestern University Press. ISBN 9780810111127.

== References and further reading ==
- Buell, Lawrence (1998). "Melville the Poet". In Levine, Robert (ed.). Cambridge Companion to Melville. Cambridge: Cambridge University Press.
- Gale, Robert L. (1995). A Herman Melville Encyclopedia. London, England: Bloomsbury Publishing.
- Jalal, Mustafa (June 2001). "'Battle-Pieces and Aspects of the War' The Novelist as Poet: A Study in the Dramatic Poetry of Herman Melville". American Studies International. 39 (2): 71–85.
- Lee, Maurice S. (Oct 2000). "Writing through the War: Melville and Dickinson after the Renaissance". PMLA. 155 (5): 1124–1128. doi:10.2307/463286.
- McWilliams, John P. Jr. (May 1971). ""Drum Taps" and Battle-Pieces: The Blossom of War". American Quarterly. 23 (2): 181–201. doi:10.2307/2711924.
- Olsen-Smith, Steven (2015). "Introduction" and "Chronology." Melville in His Own Time: A Biographical Chronicle of His Life, Drawn from Recollection, Interviews, and Memoirs by Family, Friends, and Associates. Edited by Steven Olsen-Smith. Iowa City: University of Iowa Press. ISBN 978-1-60938-333-6
- Parker, Hershel (2006). Battle-Pieces and Aspects of the War: Melville's Second Volume of Poems. ISBN 9780810111127. Ch XI in Published Poems: The Writings of Herman Melville, Northwestern – Newberry Edition Vol. 11, edited by Robert Ryan, Northwestern University Press, Evanston, 2006.
- Parker, Hershel (2008). Melville: The Making of a Poet. Evanston: Northwestern University Press. ISBN 9780810124646.
