= Israel Potter =

Book by Herman Melville

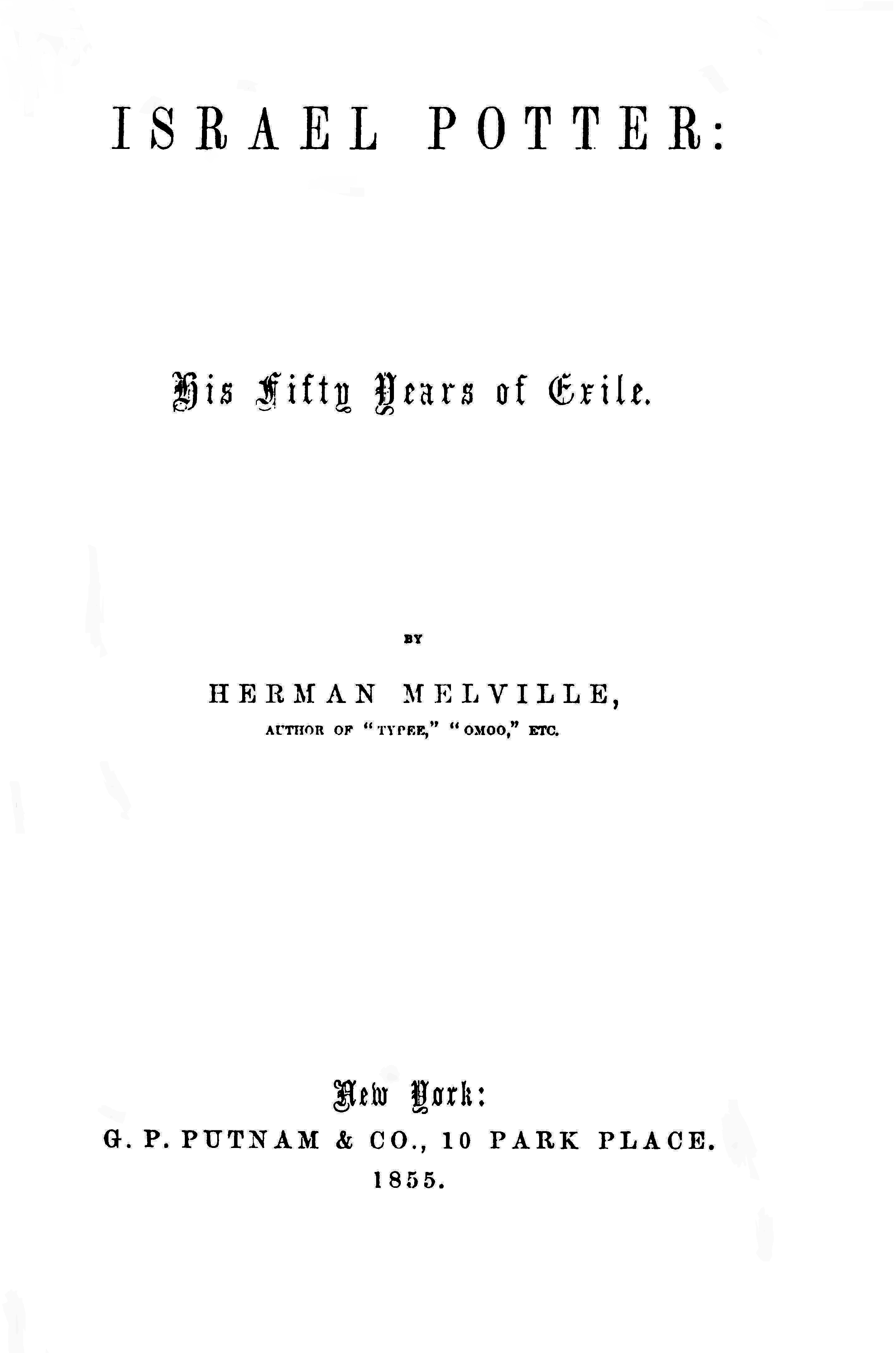
- First edition title page
- Author: Herman Melville
- Language: English
- Genre: Adventure fiction
- Published: 1854–55 (Putnam's Monthly); 1855 (G. P. Putnam & Co.)
- Publication place: United States
- Media type: Print
- Preceded by: Pierre: or, The Ambiguities
- Followed by: The Piazza Tales

Israel Potter: His Fifty Years of Exile is the eighth book by American writer Herman Melville, first published in serial form in Putnam's Monthly magazine between July 1854 and March 1855, and in book form by G. P. Putnam & Co. in March 1855. A pirated edition was also published in London by George Routledge in May 1855. The book is loosely based on a pamphlet (108-page) autobiography that Melville acquired in the 1840s, Life and Remarkable Adventures of Israel R. Potter (Providence, Rhode Island, 1824).

== Plot summary ==
When Israel Potter leaves his plow to fight in the American Revolution, he is immediately thrown into the Battle of Bunker Hill, where he receives multiple wounds. However, this does not deter him, and after hearing a rousing speech by General George Washington, he volunteers for further duty, this time at sea, where more ill fortune awaits him. Israel is captured by the British Navy and taken to England. Yet, he makes his escape, and this triggers a series of extraordinary events and meetings with remarkable people. Along the way, Israel encounters King George III, who takes a liking to the Yankee rebel and shelters him in Kew Gardens; Benjamin Franklin, who presses Israel into service as a spy; John Paul Jones, who invites Israel to join his crew aboard The Ranger; and Ethan Allen, whom Israel attempts to free from a British prison. Throughout these adventures, Israel Potter acquits himself bravely, but his patriotic valor does not bring him any closer to his dream of returning to America. After the war, Israel finds himself in London, where he descends into poverty. Finally, fifty years after he left his plough, he makes his way back to his beloved Berkshires. However, few things remain the same. Soon, Israel fades out of being, his name out of memory, and he dies on the same day the oldest oak on his native lands is blown down.

== Factual basis ==
Israel Potter (1744–1826) was a real person born in Cranston, Rhode Island. According to his own account, a memoir titled The Life and Remarkable Adventures of Israel R. Potter (published 1824), he had been a veteran of the Battle of Bunker Hill, a sailor in the Revolutionary navy, a prisoner of the British, an escapee in England, a secret agent and courier in France, and a 45-year exile from his native land as a laborer, pauper, and peddler in London. Melville's plot combines a number of Potter's actual encounters—King George III, Horne Tooke, and Benjamin Franklin—with some he never had—Ethan Allen and John Paul Jones.

== Reception ==
At about 60,000 words, the novel is much shorter than the major novels but significantly longer than two of Melville's greatest stories, "Bartleby, the Scrivener" and "Benito Cereno", which were written during the same period and included the following year in The Piazza Tales. It followed the disastrous critical and commercial failure of his previous novel, Pierre: or, The Ambiguities. Melville disliked the finished work and claimed that he wrote it as quickly as possible for the money. Marred by a passive, colorless and astonishingly unlucky hero and a depressingly anticlimactic ending, this novel of the American Revolution was a total commercial failure. In recent years, however, many critics have argued that the novel shows Melville comfortable in his narrative powers and indulging his considerable talents for humor, sly characterization, episodic action, and unsettling understatement. It is one of his easiest books to read, which is all the more surprising in that it was followed by perhaps his most difficult prose work, The Confidence-Man, in 1857.

== Play adaptation ==
Melville's novel was adapted for the stage by Joe Bravaco and Larry Rosler as The Almost True and Truly Remarkable Adventures of Israel Potter. As few as six actors perform over fifty parts on a unit set - as such, the play easily lends itself to imaginative stagecraft and diverse and gender-bending casting. It is not a conventional period piece, but a show with a contemporary spin. It is suggested that actors dress in rehearsal clothes, using makeshift props and articles of clothing to evoke the period and characters. This highlights the physical and rollicking action of the play, as well as the deep, emotional current underneath its surface that speaks to our time. The play had its world premiere at the Winnipesaukee Playhouse in Meredith, New Hampshire in 2016. This was followed by productions at the Oldcastle Theatre Company in Bennington, Vermont in 2018 and Bluff City Theater in Hannibal, Missouri in 2019. An earlier workshop production was presented by the drama department at County College of Morris in Randolph, New Jersey.
