= The Confidence-Man =

1857 satirical novel by Herman Melville

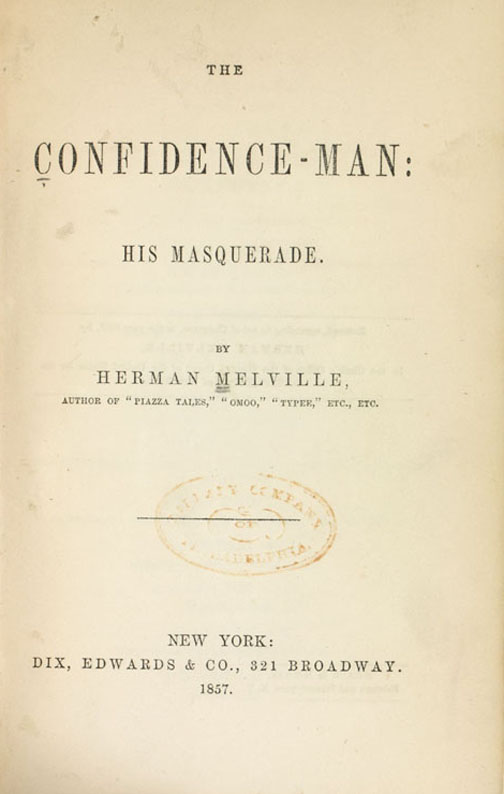
- First edition title page
- Author: Herman Melville
- Language: English
- Genre: Satirical novel, philosophical novel
- Published: 1857
- Publisher: Dix, Edwards & Co.
- Publication place: United States
- Media type: Print
- Preceded by: The Piazza Tales
- Followed by: Battle-Pieces and Aspects of the War

The Confidence-Man: His Masquerade, first published in New York on April Fool's Day 1857, is the ninth and final novel by American writer Herman Melville. The work was published on the exact day of the novel's setting. Centered on the title character, The Confidence-Man portrays a group of steamboat passengers travelling on the Mississippi River toward New Orleans. The narrative follows a succession of confidence men who, as suggested by the book's title, may be the same man in disguise. The confidence man uses various methods of persuasion to sell patent medicine, encourage speculation in fraudulent business, donate to non-existent charities, and other cons. In the latter part of the narrative, the confidence man discusses friendship and other topics with the other passengers. Interspersed with the dialogues are other texts: essay, short story, ode, and others. These additional texts inspire the reader to consider the difference between fiction and reality.

When the novel was first released, critical reception acknowledged its metaphysical angle, while criticizing its cynical point of view. Many reviewers seem not to have understood that the title hinted that one man was represented in multiple disguises and that the book criticized Christianity. Elizabeth Foster's introduction to the 1954 edition summarized the critical analysis already done and spurred further study of the work. Since then, critics have praised the work for its postmodern sensibilities, like how the confidence man both hides and reveals truth. Literary analysts have described the novel as a satire or allegory, with a possible typological reading of the work. The use of tropes from pantomime suggests that characters are fulfilling stereotyped roles. Melville based some of the characters on real-life people. The inclusion of multiple genres of writing is reminiscent of literary magazines of the day, tapping into journalistic uncertainty about the fiction and non-fiction status of the work. One of Melville's biographers stated that the reason for the many genres in the novel is that Melville lengthened it with previously-rejected works. The novel includes religious themes and shows how an economy that assumes generosity must adapt when characters like the confidence man take advantage of those assumptions. Stories within the novel address racial conflict between Indians and white settlers and illustrate how racist stories are removed from firsthand accounts from Indians.

== Historical background ==
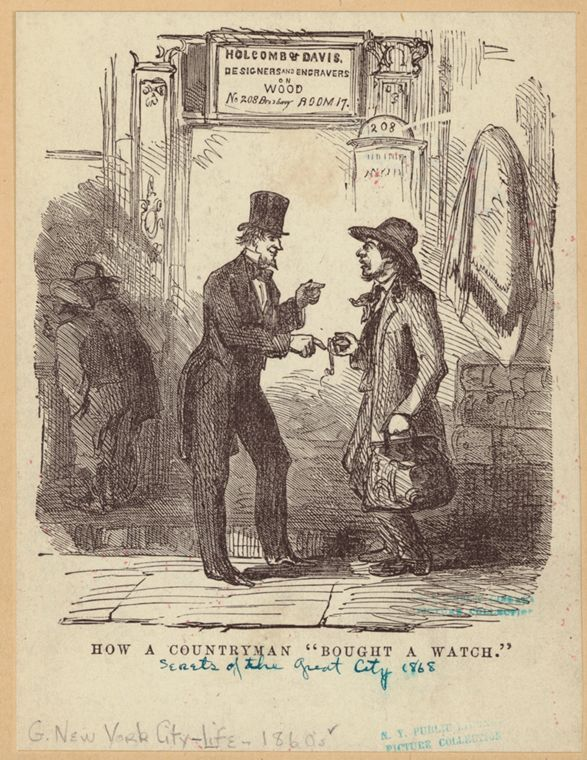
Political cartoon of one type of con from the 19th century.

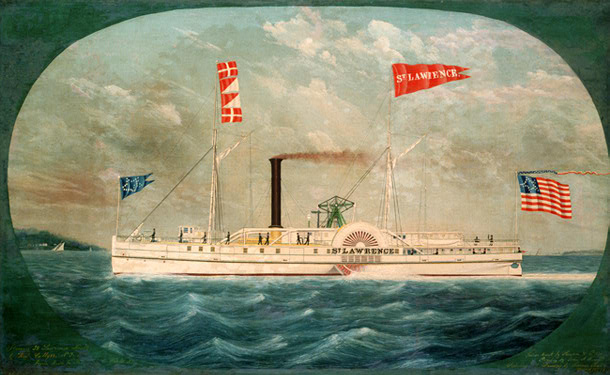
St. Lawrence steamboat, painted in 1850

At the time The Confidence-Man was published, the Mississippi River was seen as part of the Western frontier and the fringe of civilization. Drinking and gambling were common on steamboats along the Mississippi, and the frontier was associated with lawlessness and corruption. The 1850s were a time when many United States citizens felt that westward expansion was inevitable, an idea called Manifest Destiny. Individualism and materialism were both popular virtues. Coinciding with the economic growth of the 1850s, economic speculation became one way that many built or lost fortunes. Selling of stock was not well-regulated; it was possible to sell unauthorized shares of stock, or to sell stock in fictitious companies. Making money became a virtue, and the method was often not scrutinized.

Also in the 1850s, magazines portrayed P. T. Barnum's promotion of hoaxes to make money as a similar kind of flimflamming. Early in 1855, there was widespread news coverage of a man who tricked people out of their money in New York by pretending to need an emergency loan. The April account in the Albany Evening Journal, where the confidence man pretends to be an acquaintance of a jewelry store employee, and then draws attention to their shared membership in Freemasonry to gain sympathy for a monetary donation, is very similar to Ringman's con in chapter 4 of the novel. Newspaper accounts emphasized the "new" and "original" methods of the confidence man. The account in the New York Herald recounted how baldly the confidence man asked for his victim's confidence, for example, with the question "Are you really disposed to put any confidence in me?" The characters in Melville's novel similarly ask directly if their interlocutors have confidence in them. The land fraud found in the Black Rapids Coal Company and the herb doctor's miracle cures were both types of fraud common in the mid-19th-century.

Some useful background information is only relevant to certain chapters. Guinea is a free black man who, as a disabled beggar, is reliant on others. His situation as a "happy darky" shows the racist, stereotypical ideas people had about free blacks at the time, including the idea that they would be reliant on others to make a living. The Temperance movements in the 1850s led to legislation that outlawed drinking in several states, and many people believing that alcohol was injurious to one's physical and mental health. Because of this, bootleggers and other sellers often mixed lower-proof alcoholic drinks, like wine, with higher-proof drinks, like whiskey, in order to disguise their true potency. While drinking, the characters of Frank Goodman and Charlie Noble discuss how their wine has been mixed with other drinks. A "Charlie Noble" was also nautical slang for the galley chimney, his name conveying that he is a shadowy character. Observing a period of social mourning like John Ringman does was a sign of being part of the middle-class, and this character likely uses it to elicit sympathy. When the man in grey alludes to creating a World's Charity, this is a reference to the world's fair, or an international exhibition of industry and commerce. The idea is thus a satirical one, as the industry featured at the world's fair often relies on exploitation of the labor of the lower class. The patent medicine the herb doctor sells was especially popular in the 1840s and 1850s, when growing advertising and sales industries made it possible to promote remedies regardless of their effectiveness. Towards the end of the novel, an old man reads from a "traveling Bible" that is in like-new condition. Due to the efforts of the American Bible Society, millions of Bibles were distributed across America in the 1850s, many of which were not read. The young peddler sells the old man a "counterfeit detector," likely a copy of a monthly journal dedicated to reporting on counterfeit banknotes.

== Creation ==
Melville's friend and publisher, Evert Duyckinck published comments on the confidence man in the Literary World, and had the opinion that the gullibility of his victims attested to their Christian values. Duyckinck also reprinted a column from Merchant's Ledger in the Literary World that stated that those who were not fooled by the confidence man were on their way to becoming a "hardened villain", since they are suspicious of everyone's motives. The essay also recognized that confidence men exist not just on the streets, but also in politics and sales. Melville subscribed to the Literary World and likely read the pieces. Melville was also inspired by Don Quixote, which he read shortly before writing The Confidence-Man.

Melville had long been interested in blending historical facts with his fiction, but they were usually based in some of his personal experience. Before writing The Confidence-Man, Melville sent his friend Nathanial Hawthorne suggestions on how to adapt a real-life anecdote about a woman who waited for her husband for 17 years as a short story. In a 1982 monograph, Tom Quirk argues that Melville used a similar method to write The Confidence-Man. Melville's biographer, Hershel Parker, wrote that it was common for Melville to take inspiration from newspaper stories, as he did with "Bartleby, the Scrivener" Chapter 44 of the novel contains a narrative digression on how to create an "original" character like Hamlet, Milton's Satan and Don Quixote, including a discussion on Melville's own attempt to create an "original" character in the cosmopolitan Frank Goodman.

Melville was not financially successful as a writer and by 1853, he had incurred many debts, some of which he was unable to repay. He worked on the manuscript for The Confidence-Man between 1855 and 1856. He had problems with severe sciatica pain during 1855. He wanted to publish The Confidence-Man serially in Putnam's, but it was not accepted for publication. While visiting New York in December 1855 (during the composition of the novel), Melville read the entry on himself in Cyclopaedia of American Literature written by Evert Duckinck and his brother. The entry described Melville as a writer who did not trouble himself with "the exactions of artificial life," and concluded that Pierre was a "literary mistake". On request from Allan Melville (Herman's brother), Nathaniel Hawthorne, a longtime friend of Herman, acted as Herman's agent while he was touring Europe and the area around Jerusalem.

The Confidence-Man was published on April Fool's Day in 1857. Melville's father's family came from Scotland, where on April Fool's day, there is a tradition of sending gullible people on long journeys for no reason. For example, the perpetrator of the prank might ask a man to deliver a letter to a neighbor, which tells the neighbor to send the man to another person with a similar letter, until he realizes that he is being fooled. The way that the confidence man pulls successive pranks on the steamship passengers is reminiscent of this practice.

== Summary ==
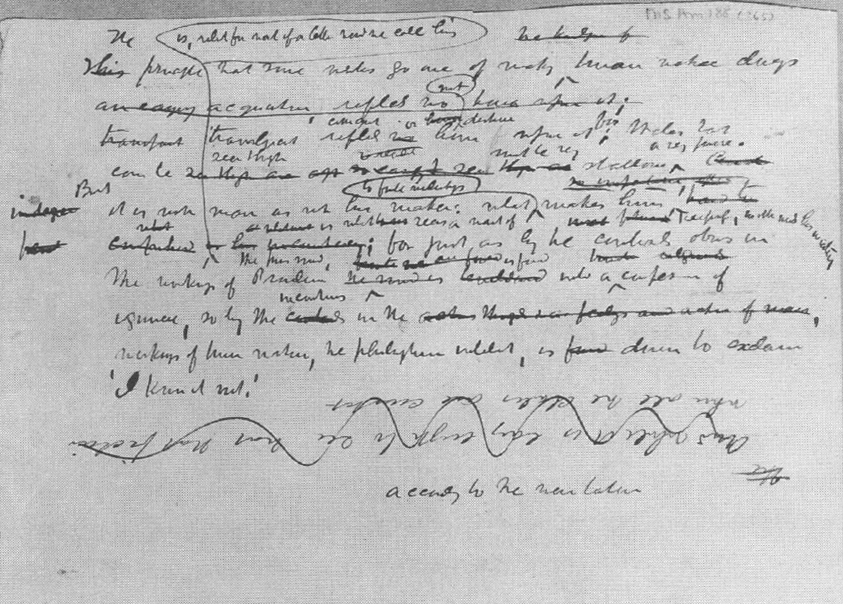
Manuscript fragment from Chapter 14 of The Confidence-Man.

The novel's title refers to its central character, an ambiguous figure. He sneaks aboard a Mississippi steamboat on April Fool's Day. This stranger attempts to test the confidence of the passengers. Their varied reactions constitute the bulk of the text, which is formatted in a series of vignettes. While the vignettes do not build on each other, they do allude to each other. Each person is forced to confront the placement of his trust. The entire novel takes place over the course of one day.

In the first chapter, a deaf-mute man writes quotes from the Bible about charity on a sign, to the skepticism of the crowd. A black man named Guinea begs for money, and a man accuses him of being neither black nor disabled. A man with a weed in his hat named John Ringman tells Mr. Roberts that they have met before; Roberts insists that they have not. Ringman recounts his troubled life to Roberts, and notes that they are both masons. Roberts gives Ringman some money in sympathy. A man in a grey coat convinces a young clergyman to give him money to give to Guinea. Encourged, the man in the grey coat asks him for a donation to a charity for widows and orphans, which he receives. He asks more passengers to donate to the charity, with some success.

After being warned that he could be swindled by a man in a cap, a young college student buys stock in Black Rapid Coal Company from John Ringman. The man in the cap convinces Roberts to buy stock in the Black Rapid Coal Company. An unnamed narrator relates how Ringman lost a wife and child and is now raising money to get custody of his daughter, which makes Roberts and the man in a cap sympathetic to him. The narrator states that authors should write their characters consistently, even though in reality, people are inconsistent. As payment for bringing him water, the man in the cap asks the miser for confidence to invest his money, which claims that he can triple. The miser gives him one hundred dollars, and the man in the cap leaves.

A sick man strikes up a conversation with an herb doctor, who sells him medicine. The herb doctor sells liniment to Thomas Fry, an injured soldier and to the miser, after reporting to the miser that he just saw the man in the cap debark. The Missourian, Pitch, warns the miser that the medicine won't work, and they debate the merits of "natural" illness, remedies, and disasters. The herb doctor overhears and fails to convince Pitch of his sincerity. Pitch strikes up a conversation with the round-backed man, who claims that he works at an employment agency and convinces him to hire a boy. Afterwards, he talks to the cosmopolitan Frank Goodman and rebuffs his offer of friendship.

Charlie Noble, a stranger from the West, tells Goodman that Pitch reminds him of Moredock, a famed Indian-hater. Noble tells Goodman how John Moredock, after Indians kill his mother, kills many Indians in revenge. Despite being a murderer, Moredock was a devoted husband and father and otherwise likeable. Goodman finds this hard to believe, and asks Noble to be charitable when judging Pitch. Goodman and Noble become friends, and they drink together. After Goodman asks Noble for a loan, Noble almost leaves, but Goodman performs a rite and commands him to return. Noble concludes that Goodman's request for money was an "absurd story." The unnamed narrator tells the reader his theories about the importance of reality in fiction.

Mark Winsom, a mystic, warns Goodman that Noble is not trustworthy. Winsom's disciple, Egbert, meets Goodman. Egbert tells Goodman that lending him money would ruin their friendship; Goodman wants the loan to test their friendship. Goodman goes to the barbershop, where "no trust" is displayed prominently. Goodman tells the barber that he should trust, and tells the barber he will cover any debts the barber incurs for trusting. The barber wants to have a written contract, so Goodman walks away without paying for his shave. An old man has Goodman read from the Bible to him, and Goodman reads quotes about how we should be distrustful. The old man says these words are from the apocrypha, so they aren't true. The old man buys a lock for his door to guard against thieves while Goodman leads him to his room.

== Reception ==
According to biographer Delbanco, critics were "baffled" by The Confidence-Man, and some reviews were "vicious". Whereas reviews of Moby-Dick elicited responses from Melville and caused him insecurity about the popularity of his writing, reviews of The Confidence-Man had less impact on him. After completing the manuscript, Melville had already decided to stop writing novels. Reviews from London, England were, according to the editors of the Norton Critical Edition of The Confidence-Man, of "more historical significance" than the American reviews. A recent discovery of three more American reviews found that at least some American reviewers considered The Confidence-Man with more "serious attention." Contemporary reviewers described the style as "controlled, vivid, extraordinarily powerful, graphic, fresh, and entertaining" while being oblivious to the novel's critiques of Christianity.

Multiple American newspapers gave reviews of the novel, although notably, Harper's did not review the novel. North American and United States Gazette called it "a sketchy affair" with occasional humor that peeks out "though buried under quite too many words." The Evening Transcript from Boston praised Melville's treatment of the archetypal confidence man and described Melville as dealing "equally well in the material description and the metaphysical insight of human life." Boston's Daily Times was less generous, calling it "ineffably meaningless and trashy." In Maine: "We have found it hard reading." In the recently discovered longer reviews, the Troy Daily Whig found how Melville puts the confidence man on display "entirely original". The Bangor Daily Whig in Maine wrote that the novel "has a good deal of sound philosophy in it, but some of the incidents of humbuggery." The monthly newspaper United States Journal acknowledged the craftsmanship of the novel, but was highly critical of it, calling it a "desecration of the fine talents and affluent genius of the author. [...] Satire that has no mellowness is inhuman; we are made worse rather than better from it."

Reviews from London were more in-depth and saw Melville's change in style as a sign of his development as an author, while being conscious of the book's flaws. Elizabeth Foster attributes England's interest to the book's "sharp satire on the American scene." The Athenaeum called the novel a "moral miracle-play" for its focus on how various characters interact in dialogue with the confidence man, either as credulous dupes or would-be followers. They acknowledged that Melville's style is "one, from its peculiarities, difficult to manage" but that he "pours his colours over the narration with discretion as well a prodigality", concluding that the novel was "invariably graphic, fresh, and entertaining." London's Leader described Melville's style as full of "festoons of exuberant fancy" interspersed with descriptions of the American steamboat and surrounding landscape. They praised Melville's use of satire, and criticized his habit of "discours[ing] upon too large a scale" and keeping his characters too rigid. A review from Literary Gazette was not as generous and described the book not as a novel, but as a series of forty-five conversations, which "so far resembling the Dialogues of Plato as to be undoubted Greek to ordinary men." The review continued to criticize the style as long-winded and obscure. They conceded that "this caldron, so thick and slab with nonsense, often bursts into the bright, brief bubbles of fancy and wit" and concluded that the book was ruined with "strained effort after excessive originality." A review at Spectator did not appreciate the "local allusions" in the work, and found the satirical style to be "drawn from the European writers of the seventeenth and eighteenth centuries, with some of Mr. Melville's own Old World observations superadded." Foster noticed that many contemporary reviewers failed to realize that the book's overall tone was deeply pessimistic and criticizing Christianity.

Before the 1920s revival of interest in Melville, the novel was only published as part of Melville's complete works and widely considered to be Melville's weakest novel. Later evaluations of The Confidence-Man have been more generous. In 1922, Carl Van Vechtan called it "the great satire on Transcendentalism" and called for its re-examination. In the 1940s, it was the subject of a doctoral dissertation and several shorter academic works. Still, critics in the 1930s through the 1950s found it misanthropic, nihilistic, bitter and cynical. In more recent criticism, American historian Walter A. McDougall wrote that it "holds up a mirror to the American people". Melville biographer Delbanco called the book "a prophetically postmodern work in which swindler cannot be distinguished from swindled and the confidence man tells truth and lies simultaneously". Writing in the Columbia Literary History of the United States, Robert Milder wrote, "Long mistaken for a flawed novel, the book is now admired as a masterpiece of irony and control, although it continues to resist interpretive consensus."

== Style ==
Watson Branch, an associate professor in comparative literature at the University of Cincinnati, divided the structure of The Confidence-Man into four parts: 1) conversations between the six avatars of the Confidence Man and his targets, which result in success or failure; 2) conversations between the cosmopolitan (another avatar) and other steamboat passengers on the topics of friendship and confidence; 3) the frame of the story, consisting of the events at the beginning and end of the novel; and 4) interruptions of various material, including the digressions by the narrator and stories told by passengers, as well as later digressive additions. The way the chapters are separated changes halfway through the novel. Whereas in the beginning, each chapter is a contained confidence trick, in chapters 25-41, they are used to heighten drama, sometimes in the middle of a conversation. The majority of the text consists of dialogues between steamboat passengers. At times, Melville includes action that contributes to the reader's understanding of the conversation which expose truths contrary to what the characters are saying, such as when the old miser leans heavily against the herb doctor in chapter 21, provoking the herb doctor to complain that the miser is leaning on him too heavily. Eventually, the Missourian asks the miser to lay in his grave if he can't stand up by himself, exposing the miser's weakness and the herb doctor's hypocrisy. These are interspersed with the insertion of other texts, including essay, short story, an ode, and "The Metaphysics of Indian-Hating". Unlike in Moby-Dick, when a central narrator unites disparate accounts, these various genres of texts give multiple perspectives. While Melville authored most of these texts-within-the-text, the Indian-Hating chapters come from History, Life, and Manners, in the West by James Hall. Another story, told by one character (Egbert) in the style of another character (Charlie) comes from a short story Melville had written previously. Branch speculates that the stories are later additions to the initial manuscript, meant to make it longer. As evidence, Branch states that most of the stories are independent of the main narrative. However, the introduction of the stories does allow the novel to explore the connection between fiction and reality, which is more overtly discussed in the three essays on fiction which address the reader directly in chapters 14, 33, and 44. The essays on fiction show Melville reconsidering some of his ideas about fiction. The essay in chapter 33 addresses realism, postulating that it was unnecessary in fiction. The essay in chapter 44 argues that authors do not create original characters most of the time.

=== As satire ===
As a satire, The Confidence-Man drew inspiration from British or Irish satires like Gulliver's Travels and The Citizen of the World. The highly specific chapter titles were a style popular in the 18th century in humorous books like Tom Jones and Amelia. Additionally, the character of the confidence man could be an allegory for how the Christian devil works as the Father of Lies in America, using the imagery of the serpent and Biblical language to make the allegory clear. According to Melville's biographer Hershel Parker, the way that the allegory permeates quotidian conversations makes them significant on a metaphysical level. Parker also saw the work as a satire criticizing Americans' willingness to accept that all is well when it is obvious that not all is well. Elizabeth Foster, in her introduction to a 1954 edition, called it a social satire as well as "a philosophical satire on optimism" resembling Candide in its message. However, stylistically, unlike Candide, The Confidence-Man "is [a satire] of subtle, pervasive, elusive irony, of suggestion and understatement rather than exaggeration, of talk rather than action." Cook classified the novel as a complex Menippean satire, with a plot that doesn't move forward, but in line with the satire genre, bends back on itself. He identified the scene where Charlie Noble and the Cosmopolitan drink as a "symposium or drinking party" which is part of the form of the classical Menippean satire.

Melville scholar Helen Trimpi considered The Confidence-Man to be both a political satire and a novelistic adaptation of pantomime and commedia dell'arte puppetry. In her political reading, Trimpi argues that the titular Confidence-Man is symbolic of the antebellum Republican Party. This identification leads into Trimpi's observation that routinely "his [the Confidence-Man's] antagonist is a Democrat, Nativist or other opponent of the Republicans" and the collision of each character's worldview of human nature as good or selfish in the various cons. Trimpi views the thesis of the novel as pleading for moderation on the slavery question for the continuity of the Union. In her view, Melville uses the novel to warn of propaganda's tendency to mold and inflame public opinion, particularly when faced with "sectional controversy." Melville's characterization, which uses pantomime archetypes, enables a reading of The Confidence-Man where "the premise of the book is that the people in it are all acting out predetermined roles." This reading also suggests that the novel proposes that "the world may be a carnival, fair, or Shrovetide masquerade where man himself... passes in parade, always wearing a mask." In his examination of the novel as satire, Cook also recognized theatrical elements like pantomime, minstrelsy, and farce.

=== As allegory ===
The novel has been interpreted as an allegory similar to Hawthorne's "The Celestial Railroad," drawing on the Christian allegorical tradition shown in The Pilgrim's Progress. Using Christian typological reading, parts of the narrative in The Confidence Man can be linked to the Bible, The New Testament, and the Book of Revelation in ways that are significant to its narrative. These typological readings usually rely on the division between the first part of the novel, in which the confidence man cons passengers in various disguises, and the second part, in which the Cosmopolitan, another avatar of the confidence man, discusses various topics with other passengers. Viewed through the lens of biblical typology, the first part can represent a focus on Mosaic law, while the second part emphasizes Christian virtues of grace and charity. Thus the entire volume becomes a typological representation of the two Testaments of the Bible. The novel can also be read as a typological representation of the pre- and post-crucifixion portions of the New Testament, with the first part representing Christ's coming to earth, and the second part representing his final weeks. As a typology of the Book of Revelation, the confidence man becomes an antitype of both Christ and Antichrist.

=== Modernity and modernism ===
Katie McGettigan, a senior lecturer in American literature at Royal Holloway, University of London wrote a book on Melville and Modernity. She argues that The Confidence-Man engages with mass-produced text and printing in a way that anticipates Walter Benjamin's work on the subject. The novel is modeled after various works that were published in the literary magazines of his day. This mass-reproduction of work led to "the dissolution of the link between authenticity and originality". Rather than a religious allegory, McGettigan sees the book as "novel and periodical, original and copy, frustrating and pleasurable"—a work that attests to "the aesthetic power and creative potential of multiplicity." The resulting work revels in "the partial, multiple, and modern." In a book on theater and the Market in America, Jean-Christophe Agnew, an American studies professor at Yale, saw The Confidence-Man as looking backward and forward like Janus. The "corrective criticism" the novel uses looks back to ancient times, while its aggressive ambiguity looks forward to modernist stances. Melville uses the inherent contradictions of market exchange to "deconstruct Common Sense, the conventional novel, and, in the end, Melville's own relation to his reader."

== Literary analysis ==
=== Characters and characterization ===
Foster called the character of the Confidence Man "Melville's most ironic and bitter presentment of his half-mystical apprehension of evil at the heart of things," or in other words, the Devil. She noticed that some readers saw the Confidence Man as one man wearing disguises throughout the book, while others thought he was only one of these men. One reviewer saw him as a good person trying to get others to be more trusting, while others saw him as a swindler. Foster's interpretation of the confidence men as various disguises of the Devil, with the novel as religious allegory, has become a standard interpretation of the novel. Critics Leslie Fiedler, Lawrance Thompson, and Malcolm O. Magaw disagree and see the confidence man as a manifestation of God. Quirk disputes either allegoric interpretation, arguing that Melville would be unlikely to use such a consistent device in his fiction, when he usually used his fiction as a mode of philosophical exploration. An article by Jason M. Wirth, a philosophy professor, discusses self in The Confidence-Man. Wirth interprets the titular character as constantly changing his appearance, which is implied by the subtitle "His Masquerade" and the chapter where the narrator disputes the common authorial wisdom that characters should remain consistent. The confidence man takes advantage the uncertainty of who is trustworthy. In finding the method to gain another's confidence, one "exposes the self's fundamental attachment and commitments". Still another reading of the eponymous "confidence man" is that Melville himself performs a confidence trick on the reader through the convoluted narrative.

Branch has a slightly different interpretation of the avatars of the Confidence Man. He believes that Melville's original plan was for six characters to be the Confidence Man in disguise: Guinea, John Ringman, the man in the gray coat, John Truman (selling shares of the coal company), the herb doctor, and the man with a brass plate (the agent from the employment agency). However, this plan seems to break down when the herb doctor reappears in chapter 21 after telling the miser he has to leave soon. Branch suggested that Melville's revisions could have been incomplete. Guinea's initial list of trustworthy men included a man in a yellow vest, who could be Charlie Noble, and a man in a violet robe, who could also be Charlie Noble. It seems odd that the cosmopolitan (Frank Goodman) is not part of Guinea's list; many critics consider him another instance of the confidence man in disguise. The cosmopolitan, rather than trying to con characters into giving him money, converses with them to reveal inconsistencies in their thought. Branch interprets this as Melville's attempt "to expose the hypocrisy or impracticability of the philosophies that support Christianity, human society, and Emersonianism."

Quirk describes how the various confidence men attest to each others' trustworthiness, like how Guinea describes a list of good and honest gentlemen, and is in turn described as trustworthy by the man with the weed and the man in gray. Quirk also interprets the "soldier of fortune" as a criminal malingerer, and Goodman and Noble as dueling con men.

The work includes satires of 19th-century literary figures: Mark Winsome is based on Ralph Waldo Emerson, while his "practical disciple" Egbert is Henry David Thoreau; Charlie Noble is based on Nathaniel Hawthorne; and a beggar in the story was inspired by Edgar Allan Poe. The conversation between Winsome and Egbert has been interpreted as satirizing the transcendentalism and its focus on self-reliance as disallowing individuals to call for help. Yoshiaki Furui, an English professor at Aoyama Gakuin University, saw the character of Black Guinea as an example of how Melville hints at his characters' emotions rather than explaining them. In the scene where Guinea receives alms, he swallows his "secret emotions" and winces when coins strike his face. However, it is unclear if he is wincing in pain, or as part of the performance of begging. The novel indicates that some inner emotion exists, "highlighting both its presence and its unknowability at once".

=== Themes ===
English professor Caleb Doan, in an article examining gift exchanges in Melville's works, found that The Confidence-Man shows a "dystopic version of exchange" in which gifts are based not on generosity or reciprocation, but on "self-aggrandizement and exploitation." The steamer Fidele corresponds with America in general. The exchange between the barber William Cream and his customer Frank Goodman illustrates the deeply cynical outlook The Confidence-Man takes towards gift economies. Goodman convinces Cream to take down his "No Trust" sign by saying he will pay for anyone who betrays that trust. But then Goodman himself refuses to pay after his shave, telling him to trust him to pay later (which he does not do). Cream puts his "No Trust" sign back up, and we understand that, as Doan explains, "the modern-world economy has corrupted the notion of benevolent exchange."

Characters discuss ideas that have religious significance. Jonathan Cook, a Melville scholar, described it as "a literary theodicy dramatizing the author's obsession with the problem of evil, the existence of God, and man's limited capacity to know God or comprehend the truths that would justify the ways of God to man."

One of the main themes of the novel is unresolvable conflict, including racial conflict. In the chapter where the confidence man appears as a "non-resistant", the other passengers can't decide whether to have sympathy for him or to see him as trying to take advantage of their sympathy. This mirrors the tension between the belief that philosophy can help to resolve questions of morality and justice, and the belief that, as the title of the chapter states, "many men have many minds." This initial encounter prepares the reader for the "Indian-hating" chapters. Writing for J19, Rachel Ravina, an English professor at Boston University, saw these chapters as commenting on George Copway's writings for a white audience about his experience as an Ojibwe man. Copway also wrote about white culture as an insider-outsider. Melville's chapters focus on the generalizations made in frontier writing. The character Charlie Noble tells the confidence man stories about John Moredock which he heard secondhand. Moredock is the eponymous Indian-hater of the chapter. Ravina interprets this as a commentary on how the information is filtered through multiple people: "we are meant to notice the absence of direct Indian speech, its silencing, filtering, distortion, or inaccessibility, along with the erasure of white violence in the selective process by which colonizers rewrite the facts." Another chapter on Indian-hating is a mock philosophical treatise on the metaphysics of Indian-hating. It posits that Indian-hating may be socialized, or chemically predisposed, and that a simple difference in environment creates physical racial differences. The satire, while trying to find a rational explanations for "Indian nature" as well as Indian-hating, which Ravina states, "points to the limitations of empirical investigations of race and the limitless bias of ethnographic description, which can never have the objectivity its authority performs." The narrator of the chapter points out his own unreliability, stating that an Indian-hating backwoodsman would never use these words, but that another person "found him expression for his meaning." Ravina generalizes the issues these chapters raise, seeing them "as an impetus for readers to recognize the representational limits of their sources and the racial dynamics of power and speech."

== Adaptations ==
The novel was turned into an opera by George Rochberg; it was premiered by the Santa Fe Opera in 1982, but was not held to be a success.

Rian Johnson's 2008 film The Brothers Bloom contains plot elements and some characters that allude to The Confidence-Man. Anne Billson of The Guardian also observed that the structural technique of using chapter titles in the film could be read as an homage both to literary inspirations such as The Confidence-Man and to older crime films such as The Sting.

== Sources ==
- Agnew, Jean-Christophe (1986). Worlds Apart: The Market and the Theater in Anglo-American Thought, 1550-1750. Cambridge University Press.
- Branch, Watson G. (1973). "The Genesis, Composition, and Structure of The Confidence-Man". Nineteenth-Century Fiction. 27 (4): 424–448. doi:10.2307/2933518. ISSN 0029-0564. JSTOR 2933518.
- Cook, Jonathan Alexander (1996). Satirical Apocalypse: An Anatomy of Melville's The Confidence-Man. Greenwood press. ISBN 978-0-313-29404-4.
- Delbanco, Andrew (2005). Melville: His World and Work. New York: Alfred A. Knopf. ISBN 0375403140.
- Foster, Elizabeth (1954). "Introduction". The Confidence-Man: His Masquerade. New York: Hendricks House, Inc. pp. xiii–xcv.
- McGettigan, Katie (2017). Herman Melville: Modernity and the Material Text. Durham, New Hampshire: University of New Hampshire Press. ISBN 9781512601381.
- Melville, Herman; Parker, Hershel; Niemeyer, Mark (2006). The Confidence-Man: His Masquerade: an authoritative text, contemporary reviews, biographical overviews, sources, backgrounds, and criticism (2nd ed.). New York: W.W. Norton & Co. ISBN 9780393979275.
  - Parker, Hershel (2006). "The Confidence Man's Masquerade". In Parker, Hershel; Niemeyer, Mark (eds.). The confidence-man: his masquerade: an authoritative text, contemporary reviews, biographical overviews, sources, backgrounds, and criticism (2nd ed.). New York: W.W. Norton & Co. ISBN 9780393979275.
  - Cook, Jonathan A. (2006). "Melville, the Classics, and The Confidence-Man". In Parker, Hershel; Niemeyer, Mark (eds.). The confidence-man: his masquerade: an authoritative text, contemporary reviews, biographical overviews, sources, backgrounds, and criticism (2nd ed.). New York: W.W. Norton & Co. ISBN 9780393979275.
- Milder, Robert (1988). Columbia Literary History of the United States. Columbia University Press. ISBN 0231058128.
- Parker, Hershel (2002). Herman Melville: A Biography. Volume 2, 1851-1891. Vol. 2: 1851-1891. Baltimore (Md.) London: the Johns Hopkins university press. ISBN 0801868920.
- Quirk, Tom (1982). Melville's Confidence Man: From Knave to Knight. Columbia & London: University of Missouri Press. ISBN 0826203701.
- Ravina, Rachel S. (2021). ""There Is an Indian Nature": Ethnography, Skepticism, and the "Theory of the Peace Congress" in Melville's Confidence-Man". J19: The Journal of Nineteenth-Century Americanists. 9 (2): 331–355. doi:10.1353/jnc.2021.0031.
- Simonetti, Paolo (2013). "'Something Further May Follow': Melville's Legacy and Contemporary Adaptations of The Confidence-Man". Leviathan. A Journal of Melville Studies. 15 (3): 117-130. DOI: 10.1353/lvn.2013.0022.
- Trimpi, Helen (1987). Melville's Confidence Men and American Politics in the 1850s. Hamden, Connecticut: The Connecticut Academy of Arts & Sciences. ISBN 0208021302.
- West, Cornel; Burnett, D. Graham (Fall 2007). "Metaphysics, Monday & the Messiah: A Conversation about Melville's "The Confidence-Man"". Daedalus. 137 (4).
