= Isle of the Cross =

Possible unpublished and lost work by Herman Melville

"Isle of the Cross" (c. 1853) is a possible unpublished and lost work by Herman Melville, which would have been his eighth book, coming after the commercial and critical failures of Moby-Dick (1851) and Pierre: or, The Ambiguities (1852). Melville biographer Hershel Parker suggests that the work, perhaps a novel, perhaps a story, was what had been known as the "story of Agatha," completed around May 1853. He further suggests that finishing the work showed that Melville had not, as many biographers argued, been discouraged and turned away from fiction.

Unlike almost all of Melville's other fiction, this work has a female central character.

== Background ==
On a visit to Nantucket in July 1852 John H. Clifford, a New Bedford lawyer, state attorney general, and friend of Melville's father-in-law Lemuel Shaw, told Melville the story of Agatha Hatch Robertson, a Nantucket woman who had cared for a shipwrecked sailor named Robertson. After their marriage, Robertson abandoned her and their daughter, only to return seventeen years later, then to abandon them once again and be exposed as a bigamist.

In a letter to his friend Nathaniel Hawthorne Melville described "the great patience, & endurance, & resignedness of the women of the island in submitting so uncomplainingly to the long, long absences of their sailor husbands," and urged Hawthorne to adopt this "little idea." Hawthorne did not take up the idea, however. Melville worked on the manuscript in the summer and winter of 1852. When Melville took a manuscript to his New York publishers, Harper & Brothers, in June 1853, they rejected the work. The publisher was possibly concerned about poor reviews of Pierre, or feared legal action from Agatha Hatch's family.

== Subsequent scholarship ==
Although Melville's first biographers did not know of its existence, as early as 1922 the writer Meade Minnigerode found a cache of Melville family letters in the New York Public Library which included several references in 1853 to a major work which was not subsequently published. Harrison Hayford in 1946 suggested that the confirmation in a newly found letter that Melville had completed a major project after the failure of Moby-Dick exposed "serious errors in the theory now generally held", that Melville "in despair and defiance at the reception of Moby-Dick had written Pierre with "no expectation that it would succeed with the public", and expected that it would be his last book. Merton M. Sealts, Jr., in state of the field note of 1980, endorsed the possibility that Melville wrote the story in the winter of 1853 with Hawthorne's style in mind and that the work was a transition toward the "Hawthornesqe symbolism" of Melville's later stories. Sealts quotes Melville's letter to Harper's Magazine of November 24, 1853, referring to "the work which I took to New York last Spring, but which I was prevented from printing at that time..." Parker in 1990 suggested that the "Agatha story" was the "Isle of the Cross" and devoted extensive space to it in the second volume of his Melville biography. In 1991, Basem L. Ra'ad concluded that "The Isle of the Cross" refers to a story, not a full-length book, and that the story was incorporated into "Encantadas, or Enchanted Isles", a series of sketches published in The Piazza Tales.

Some reviewers of his Herman Melville: A Biography (2002) still objected to Parker's identification of the lost manuscript with "Isle of the Cross". Richard H. Brodhead, then of Yale University, writing in the New York Times of June 23, 2002, labelled Parker's "surmise" as "dubious," and Andrew Delbanco of Columbia University, wrote in The New Republic, that Parker "trusts his own intuition" and presents "inferences as facts," for "such a book was never published – and it is a surmise that Melville ever wrote it." Parker replied that the "surmise" was based on a line of Melville scholarship going back to the 1920s which Broadhead did not appear to be familiar with, and that Delbanco's "ignorance of three quarters of a century of scholarship" was "baffling." In 2012 Parker noted that in Delbanco's own 2006 biography of Melville, he "had somehow learned about the existence" of "The Isle of the Cross," which he had "assured the readers of The New Republic I had merely 'surmised.'"

== In fiction ==
In the novel The Secret of Lost Things by Sheridan Hay, one of the characters, Walter Geist, is secretly purchasing the original manuscript of "Isle of the Cross".
