= Merton Sealts =

Merton M. Sealts Jr. (December 8, 1915 – June 4, 2000) was a scholar of American literature, focusing on Ralph Waldo Emerson and Herman Melville. His most important works are the genetic edition of Melville's Billy Budd, Sailor (1962, co-edited with Harrison Hayford), Pursuing Melville, 1940–1980 (1982) and Melville's Reading (1966, revised edition 1988). He taught at Lawrence College (1948–1965), and became Henry A. Pochmann Professor of English at the University of Wisconsin–Madison (1965-1982). He won both Ford Foundation and Guggenheim fellowships.

== Early years ==
Sealts was born on 8 December 1915, in Lima, Ohio, as an only child to Merton Sealts (1876-1946) and Daisy Hathaway Sealts (1879-1974). His father worked as a salesman for the family business of wholesale grocers. Initially the family lived on 540 West Market Street, but when Sealts was nine years old they moved to a house under construction at 1440 West Market Street, in a new addition called Westwood. Sealts's schooling began in 1921 at Franklin elementary in Lima. In 1929 he enrolled at Lima Central High School, where his principal interest during all four years was in journalism.

In 1933 he enrolled at the College of Wooster as a member of the Class of 1937, the first member of either side of his family to attend college. At Wooster he took courses in philosophy with Vergilius Ferm, where Plato became one of his favorites. In his senior year, he took courses on Shakespeare with Howard Lowry, and on Milton with Lowell W. Coolidge. Lowry advised him to study English at Yale, where he enrolled in 1937. In his third year, he took a seminar with Stanley T. Williams, who was among the first scholars to teach American literature, a field which had not been formed. Sealts wrote one paper on "the intellectual affiliations of Emerson's Nature and another, out of which his dissertation grew, on Melville's major philosophical ideas." Sealts described Williams's seminar in American literature as "the most valuable course I took at Yale and the most influential as well." Williams supervised more than a dozen dissertations on Melville, among them Sealts's on "Herman Melville's Reading in Ancient Philosophy." His classmates included many of the scholars who would lay down many of the fundaments for Melville studies.

== Army years ==
In early 1942, Sealts was drafted in the United States Army. After his training, he was stationed in Brazil in 1943, and in New Delhi, India the following year.

== Scholar ==
Sealts's first publication was an essay on "Herman Melville's 'I and My Chimney'", which appeared in American Literature for May 1941. In 1965 he joined the faculty at the University of Wisconsin–Madison, where he became the Henry A. Pochmann Professor of English, teaching both graduates and undergraduates. Dissertations on Emerson, Thoreau, Hawthorne, Melville, and James were among the twent-nine he directed. According to Gail Coffler, one of his Ph.D. students, his own prose is free of "jargon or trendy language so that his books and essays have never become outdated nor will they be superseded." And Melville scholars "will always consult Melville's Reading and cite the 'Sealts number'. That will stand."

== Judgments of Sealts's scholarship ==
From 1967 to 1971 Sealts wrote the annual chapters in American Literary Scholarship reviewing the year's publications on Melville. In the chapter for 1974, Hershel Parker called Sealts's The Early Lives of Melville the year's best study: "This is a highly significant contribution, a long-needed work which is a model of responsible scholarship, both meticulous and far-ranging, a reproach and an inspiration to the dozens who regularly publish on Melville with none of the respect for truth which pervades this study." In 1980, Sealts published "Melville and Emerson's Rainbow" (included in Pursuing Melville), which Parker described in his ALS chapter surveying 1980 as "one of the handful of classic scholarly essays on Melville, a meticulous, immensely judicious evaluation of Melville's knowledge of and ambivalent response to Ralph Waldo Emerson." In 1982, Robert Milder—who was then writing the ALS survey chapters—called "Melville and the Platonic Tradition", the new essay written especially for Pursuing Melville, "a major contribution to our understanding of the influences upon Melville's thought and writing." Sealts contributed an essay on Billy Budd to John Bryant (ed.), A Companion to Melville Studies (Greenwood Press, 1986) which book Parker reviewed in Nineteenth-Century Literature (1988), describing the essay as "one of the series of classic pieces Sealts has been publishing pell mell since his retirement, the most impressive string of articles any Melvillean has yet produced."

In 1987 Sealts was the main editor of Melville's The Piazza Tales and Other Prose Pieces, which contained the texts of Melville's lectures that Sealts reconstructed in 1957. He also decided what attributed pieces were to be included. Calling Sealts "the undisputed authority on Melville's short prose works, and a pioneer in the movement to appreciate their artistic worth," Lea Newman praised his "impeccably documented and flawlessly written 'Historical Note'" and described his research as "an exercise in literary sleuthing of consummate skill," his involvement "both informs and validates this edition as nothing else could."

In 1988 appeared the revised and enlarged edition of Melville's Reading. In his ALS Melville survey for 1988, Brian Higgins described the book: "Sealts's original introductory essay is expanded into nine chapters, relating Melville's reading more closely to the composition of individual works and drawing on Melville's sources beyond the volumes he and his family are known to have owned or borrowed." In his review for the Melville Society, John Wenke ranked the work "among the most important and useful contributions to Melville scholarship," because it "provides an indispensable point of reference and departure for the practice of serious scholarship." Wenke also found the endeavor "inspiring and dignified," and that the book "testifies to [Sealts's] abiding dedication to establishing a documentary basis for literary studies."

== After retirement ==
Sealts continued publishing after retirement, and in 1992 received the Jay B. Hubell award of the Modern Language Association (American Section). His last publication dates from March 1998, a supplementary note on Melville's reading, the last result of his pursuit of half a century to find books Melville owned or borrowed, and he reports an important discovery: the emergence of a major source for Moby-Dick (1851) and for the first chapters of Mardi (1849), Frederick Debell Bennett's Narrative of a Whaling Voyage (1840), which Melville purchased in June 1847. One month before he died, the bedridden Sealts still participated in "a nationally broadcast radio series in a program on Melville's novella, Billy Budd, Sailor". He handed his research project on Melville's books over to Steven Olsen-Smith of Boise State University, whom he identified as having "the interest and commitment necessary for carrying on the project."

== Sealts bibliography ==
=== Books ===
- Melville as Lecturer. Cambridge: Harvard University Press, 1957.
- with Harrison Hayford, Billy Budd, Sailor : (an inside Narrative). (Chicago: University of Chicago Press, 1962).
- (with Alfred R. Ferguson) Emerson's "Nature": Origin, Growth, Meaning, 1969; enlarged 2nd ed., Southern Illinois University Press, 1979
- The Early Lives of Melville: Nineteenth-Century Biographical Sketches and Their Authors. Madison: University of Wisconsin Press, 1974.
- Pursuing Melville, 1940-1980: Chapters and Essays. Madison: University of Wisconsin Press, 1982.
- Melville's Reading: Revised and Enlarged Edition. University of South Carolina Press, 1988.
- Emerson on the Scholar. University of Missouri Press, 1992.
- Beyond the Classroom: Essays on American Authors. University of Missouri Press, 1996.
- Closing the Books : A Memoir of an Academic Career. (New York, N.Y.: Vantage Press, 1st, 1999). ISBN 0533127246.

=== Essays ===
- "Innocence and Infamy: Billy Budd, Sailor", in John Bryant (ed.), A Companion to Melville Studies, Greenwood Press, New York/Westport, Connecticut/London, 1986, 407-30
- "'An utter idler and a savage': Melville in the Spring of 1852." Melville Society Extracts 79, 1-3.

=== Supplementary Notes to Melville's Reading (1988) ===
- "A Supplementary Note to Melville's Reading (1988)." Melville Society Extracts 80, February 1990, 5-10.
- "A Second Supplementary Note to Melville's Reading (1988). Melville Society Extracts 100, March 1995, 2-3.
- "A Third Supplementary Note to Melville's Reading (1988)." Melville Society Extracts 112, March 1998, 12-14.

=== Reviews ===
- John Wenke, Melville's Literary Muse: Literary Creation and the Forms of Philosophical Fiction. Melville Society Extracts 106, September 1996, 20-22.
- John B. Williams, White Fire: The Influence of Emerson on Melville. Melville Society Extracts 91, November 1992, 17-19.

== Sources ==
- Bush et al., Memorial Committee of the University of Wisconsin-Madison: Sargent Bush, Walter Rideout, and Jeffrey Steele. "On the Death of Professor Merton M. Sealts, Jr." 5 February 2001. Retrieved 25 April 2014
- Coffler, Gail H. "Merton M. Sealts, Jr." Leviathan: A Journal of Melville Studies 2:2, October 2000.
- Sealts, Merton M. Jr. (1999). Closing the Books: A Memoir of an Academic Career. New York: Vantage Press.
- Sealts, Merton M. Jr. "Announcement: Melville's Reading." Leviathan: A Journal of Melville Studies 2:1, March 2000.
- Nathalia Wright, "Melville and STW at Yale: Studies under Stanley T. Williams." Melville Society Extracts, 70 (September 1987), 1-4. Retrieved 25 April 2014.
