= Fast-Fish and Loose-Fish =

Chapter 89 of Herman Melville's Moby-Dick

"Fast-Fish and Loose-Fish" is chapter 89 of Herman Melville's 1851 novel Moby-Dick, in which Ishmael, the book's narrator, explains the concept of "Fast-Fish" and "Loose-Fish." If a whale, whether dead or not, is marked by a ship's crew with anything to claim it, such as a harpoon or rope, it is a "fast-fish", that is, it must be left alone by other whalers; if it is not so marked, it is a "loose-fish", which can be claimed and taken by any ship that finds it.

The clarity of this doctrine, Ishmael says, prevents disputes from escalating into violence. He describes court cases dealing with disputes between crews of whaling ships, and then extends the concept to society and politics, questioning the concept of ownership and the right to possession.

Legal scholars use Ishmael's arguments to illustrate that the literal text of a law can be difficult to interpret and that the morality of a law's implications is unclear. Instructors teaching Moby-Dick use the chapter to illustrate one of the book's main themes, the slippery nature of moral principles.

== The chapter ==
Ishmael opens by explaining that when the crew of a whaling ship has harpooned, wounded, or even killed a whale but for some reason is not able to take possession of it, another crew might lay claim to it. This would often lead to "vexatious and violent disputes," Ishmael goes on, creating the need for some "written or unwritten, universal, undisputed law applicable to all cases.” Whalers came to define a fish as "fast" if a ship had either formed a physical connection to it, or had killed and clearly marked it for later pickup; any fish not claimed in either manner was defined as "loose." Two simple rules were then formulated as a means of settling arguments over the ownership of a fish, as follows:

- I. A Fast-Fish belongs to the party fast to it.
- II. A Loose-Fish is fair game for anybody who can soonest catch it.

Ishmael then describes a court case in which the crew of one ship's whaleboat chased and harpooned a whale, but then had to abandon the boat in order to save themselves. A second ship later killed and claimed the whale, along with the first ship's boat and harpoon that had remained attached to it. The first crew sued the second for the value of the whale and equipment; the judge awarded the boat to the plaintiffs and the whale and harpoon to the defendants, saying that the plaintiffs had given up their rights to the latter items when they abandoned their chase. Ishmael initially says that the decision was just, as the world as a whole favors the strong over the weak. However, he mentions a divorce case cited by the defense in which a former husband brought suit to lay claim to the property of his divorced and now remarried wife on the theory that she was a "fast-fish" which he retained as property. Ishmael then describes cases with wider and wider implications, building up to an ironic attack on the concept of "loose-fish." In these cases the strong take possession of "loose-fish," that is they take whatever their strength allows them to. He gives examples of the concept:

Is it not a saying in every one's mouth, Possession is half of the law: that is, regardless of how the thing came into possession? But often possession is the whole of the law. What are the sinews and souls of Russian serfs and Republican slaves but Fast-Fish, whereof possession is the whole of the law? What to the rapacious landlord is the widow's last mite but a Fast-Fish? What is yonder undetected villain's marble mansion with a door-plate for a waif; what is that but a Fast-Fish? What is the ruinous discount which Mordecai, the broker, gets from poor Woebegone, the bankrupt, on a loan to keep Woebegone's family from starvation; what is that ruinous discount but a Fast-Fish? What is the Archbishop of Savesoul's income of L100,000 seized from the scant bread and cheese of hundreds of thousands of broken-backed laborers (all sure of heaven without any of Savesoul's help) what is that globular L100,000 but a Fast-Fish? What are the Duke of Dunder's hereditary towns and hamlets but Fast-Fish? What to that redoubted harpooneer, John Bull, is poor Ireland, but a Fast-Fish? What to that apostolic lancer, Brother Jonathan, is Texas but a Fast-Fish? And concerning all these, is not Possession the whole of the law?

In these cases of Fast-Fish, Ishmael asks, "is Possession not the whole of the law?" He then finds that the doctrine of Loose-Fish is universally applicable, as when great powers acquire new territory. He finally asks: "What are the Rights of Man and the Liberties of the world but Loose-Fish? … And what are you, reader, but a Loose-Fish and a Fast-Fish, too?"

== Thematic use in Moby-Dick ==
Critics point to meanings beneath the surface. Ishmael's description initially seems to praise the legal concept as solving whaling disputes peacefully, but the critic John Bryant points to the chapter as an example of Melville's ironic style. Melville does not generally have his characters "spout politics," says Bryant, but encourages readers to find the meaning (or meanings) for themselves. In "Fast-fish-Loose-Fish", Bryant continues, the "message of revolt" is not openly announced but "subsumed within the lyric strains of Ishmael's meditation." Ishmael gradually converts his initial off-handed meditation on the legal concept of possession into "a more sanguine, indeed calamitous, tirade" on various historical conquests, and ends with the question of whether the rights of man and the book's readers themselves are fast fish or loose.

The French critic Agnès Derail points out that the cases Ishmael refers to all give the property to whoever had control of it. Ishmael condemns the principle “possession is the whole of the law”: to legitimize the right of the strongest is to legitimize all systems of exploitation. She also points out that Melville himself treated much published literary and whaling material as "loose fish" to be freely appropriated, including literary works.

== In legal studies ==
The chapter has been taught in law school classrooms as raising questions in property law and the concept "Fast-Fish and Loose-Fish" is sometimes used to characterize legal ownership of any type of property. One law school instructor wrote that the chapter may be particularly useful in helping students understand the concept fee simple absolute as it relates to a property dispute. Another wrote that she uses "Melville's elegant and pithy meditation" on "the law's limitations" in a “rules” course like Civil Procedure. Most students believe the course principally involves memorization of the rules, so it is "often difficult for them to perceive the ambiguity of meaning and application that even some of the most apparently straightforward rules offer." They also learn the "importance of words," that "fast" does not mean "speedy", and that the text of the law is often not as important as how it is used and interpreted.

== In popular culture ==
- The theme "loose-fish" and "fast-fish" was explored in a 2006 short story by Christine Lehner, entitled No, I am not a loose-fish and neither are you.
- The singer-song writer Laurie Anderson included "Fast Fish" in her song cycle "Songs and Stories from Moby-Dick".
