= John Marr and Other Sailors =

Poetry book

- Author: Herman Melville
- Language: English
- Genre: Poetry
- Publication date: 1888
- Media type: Print
- Preceded by: Clarel
- Followed by: Timoleon

John Marr and Other Sailors is a volume of poetry published by Herman Melville in 1888. Melville published twenty-five copies at his own expense, indicating that they were intended for family and friends. Henry Chapin wrote in an introduction to a reprint that "Melville's loveable freshness of personality is everywhere in evidence, in the voice of a true poet".

The "Inscription Epistolary" is to William Clark Russell, a British sea-story author who called Melville "the greatest genius the [United States] has produced" and "first" among the "poets of the deep". Like Timoleon, his other volume of late verse, scholars have assumed that it was a "private work of art", symptomatic of his withdrawal from the literary world. Melville was putting this collection together as he was also drafting Billy Budd, which, like several poems in this collection, had prose headnotes followed by full poems.

== The poems ==
The poems include "John Marr", "Bridegroom Dick", "Tom Deadlight", "Jack Roy", "The Haglets", "The Æolian Harp", "To the Master of the 'Meteor'", "Far off-Shore", "The Man-of-War Hawk", "The Figure-Head", "The Good Craft 'Snow-Bird'", "Old Counsel", "The Tuft of Kelp", "The Maldive Shark", "To Ned", "Crossing the Tropics", "The Berg", "The Enviable Isles", and "Pebbles I-VII".

The critic F. O. Matthiessen finds an "oblique parable" to the bleakness of Melville's own later years in the title poem, "John Marr". In it, Marr, an old sailor, has left the "vastness of the sea for the vastness of the prairies". Melville's preface to the poem says that the pioneers there were "kindly", but "staid" and "sincerely, however narrowly, religious". They lacked "the free-and-easy tavern clubs ... in certain old and comfortable seaport towns", and were lacking "geniality, the flower of life springing from some sense of joy in it". But when Marr tried to enliven the occasion with a story of his adventures at sea, the blacksmith honestly said to him: "Friend, we know nothing of that here".
