= Carl Rollyson =

American biographer and professor of journalism at Baruch College

Carl E. Rollyson is an American biographer and professor of journalism at Baruch College, City University of New York.

== Selected publications ==
- Marilyn Monroe: A Life of the Actress (1986, revised 2014)
- Lillian Hellman: Her Life and Legend (1988)
- Nothing Ever Happens to the Brave: The Story of Martha Gellhorn (1990)
- The Lives of Norman Mailer (1991, revised as Norman Mailer: The Last Romantic, 2008)
- Rebecca West: A Life (1996, titled, Rebecca West: A Saga of the Century in the UK, revised as Rebecca West: A Modern Sibyl in 2008)
- The Literary Legacy of Rebecca West (1997)
- Susan Sontag: The Making of an Icon (2000, with Lisa Paddock, revised 2016)
- Herman Melville A to Z: The Essential Reference to His Life and Work (2000, with Lisa Paddock)
- Reading Susan Sontag: A Critical Introduction to Her Work (2001)
- Beautiful Exile: The Life of Martha Gellhorn (2002)
- Reading Susan Sontag (2002)
- Marie Curie: Honesty in Science (2004)
- To Be A Woman: The Life of Jill Craigie (2004)
- Documentary Film: A Primer (2004)
- Reading Biography (2004)
- Essays in Biography (2005)
- A Higher Form of Cannibalism? Adventures in the Art and Politics of Biography (2005)
- Female Icons: Marilyn Monroe to Susan Sontag (2005)
- Rebecca West and the God That Failed: Essays (2005)
- Lives of the Novelists (2005)
- Critical Companion to Herman Melville: A Literary Reference to His Life and Work (2006)
- American Biography (2006)
- Biography: A User’s Guide (2008)
- Emily Dickinson: Self-Discipline in the Service of Art (2009, with Lisa Paddock)
- Thurgood Marshall: Perseverance of Justice (2009, with Lisa Paddock)
- British Biography: A Reader (2009)
- Pablo Picasso: A Biography For Beginners (2009)
- Amy Lowell Among Her Contemporaries (2010)
- Hollywood Enigma: Dana Andrews (2012)
- Amy Lowell Anew: A Biography (2013)
- American Isis: The Life and Art of Sylvia Plath (2013)
- Marilyn Monroe: Day by Day (2014)
- A Real American Character: The Life of Walter Brennan (2015)
- A Private Life of Michael Foot (2015)
- Confessions of a Serial Biographer (2016)
- Understanding Susan Sontag (2016)
- The Last Days of Sylvia Plath (2020)
- The Life of William Faulkner, volume 1: The Past is Never Dead (1897-1934) (2020)
- The Life of William Faulkner, volume 2: This Alarming Paradox (1935-1962) (2020)
