= Timoleon (poems) =

1891 poetry collection by Herman Melville

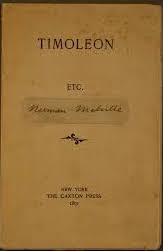
- Title page for Timoleon (1891)
- Author: Herman Melville
- Language: English
- Genre: Poetry
- Publisher: Caxton Press
- Publication date: May 1891
- Preceded by: John Marr and Other Sailors

Timoleon (full title: Timoleon and Other Ventures in Minor Verse) is a collection of forty-two poems by American writer Herman Melville. It was privately published in May 1891, four months before the author's death. Printed by the Caxton Press in an edition of 25 copies, it was the last work by the author published during his life.

== Background ==
In the spring of 1891, Melville prepared a collection of poems for press, with the assistance of his wife, Elizabeth. The volume consisted of old and new poems which reflected the author's meditations on his old age. Melville dedicated the book to American artist Elihu Vedder in honor of his admiration of Vedder's painting Jane Jackson, Formerly a Slave.

== Contents ==
- "Timoleon"
- "After the Pleasure Party"
- "The Night March"
- "The Ravaged Villa"
- "The Margrave's Birthnight"
- "Magian Wine"
- "The Garden of Metrodorus"
- "The New Zealot to the Sun"
- "The Weaver"
- "Lamia's Song"
- "In a Garret"
- "Monody"
- "Lone Founts"
- "The Bench of Boors"
- "The Enthusiast"
- "Art"
- "Buddha"
- "C_____'s Lament"
- "Shelley's Vision"
- "Fragments of A Lost Gnostic Poem of the 12th Century"
- "The Marchioness of Brinvilliers"
- "The Age of The Antonines"
- "Herba Santa"

Fruit of Travel Long Ago

- "Venice"
- "In a Bye Canal"
- "Pisa's Leaning Tower"
- "In a Church of Padua"
- "Milan Cathedral"
- "Pausilippo"
- "The Attic Landscape"
- "The Same"
- "The Parthenon"
- "Greek Masonry"
- "Greek Architecture"
- "Off Cape Colonna"
- "The Archipelago"
- "Syra"
- "Disinterment of the Hermes"
- "The Apparition"
- "In the Desert"
- "The Great Pyramid"

L' Envoi

- "The Return of the Sire de Nesle"

== Theme ==
The consistent theme running throughout these poems is the author's devotion to Art. The title poem "Timoleon", for example, has an autobiographical strain. It depicts a character (based on the historical Timoleon) who is unappreciated and exiled until war brings him to fight for his people. After securing victory, he refuses to return home. Melville at the time similarly saw himself as an unappreciated would-be savior of literature. The historical story was adapted from Plutarch with elements of Honoré de Balzac's The Two Brothers, in which a mother favors one brother over another, just as Melville saw himself in competition with his brother Gansevoort Melville.
