= Hershel Parker =

American professor of English and literature (1935–2026)

- Born: November 26, 1935; Comanche, Oklahoma, U.S.
- Died: June 19, 2026 (aged 90); Morro Bay, California, U.S.

Academic background
- Education: Lamar University

Academic work
- Discipline: English and literature
- Institutions: University of Delaware

Hershel Parker (November 26, 1935 – June 19, 2026) was an American professor of English and literature, noted for his research into the works of Herman Melville. Parker was the H. Fletcher Brown Professor Emeritus at the University of Delaware. He is co-editor with Harrison Hayford of the Norton Critical Edition of Herman Melville's Moby-Dick (1967, 2001, and 2017), and the General Editor of the Northwestern-Newberry Edition of The Writings of Herman Melville, which, with the publication of volume 13, "Billy Budd, Sailor" and Other Uncompleted Writings, is now (2017) complete in fifteen volumes. Parker is the author of a two-volume biography of Herman Melville published by Johns Hopkins University Press (1996, 2002). Parker also edited the first ever one-volume edition of Melville's complete poetry, Herman Melville: Complete Poems, published by the Library of America in 2019.

Parker was an advocate of traditional methods of literary research, which emphasize access to original materials, encourage deliberate study of chronology, and examine the relationship between a literary work and the creative genius of its author. He spoke out against academic schools of thought such as New Criticism, post structuralism and semiotics which ignore or downplay scholarly analysis of authorial intention.

In the mid-2010s Parker became a regular contributor to the webzine Journal of the American Revolution. His ongoing genealogical research in relation to American history led to a 2024 book, An Okie's Racial Reckonings, which traces the involvement of Parker's newly identified ancestors in momentous episodes of American history. One chapter depicts a North Carolina kinsman who in 1873 won full pardons for all members of the KKK. His losing opponent was Albion W. Tourgée, later the novelist of the Reconstruction and the lawyer who lost Plessy v. Ferguson.

== Life and career ==
Parker was born in Comanche, Oklahoma, on November 26, 1935, the fourth of five children of poor itinerant farmers. After dropping out of high school and working as a railroad employee, he earned a bachelor's degree in English from Lamar State College of Technology, now Lamar University. He later earned master's and doctoral degrees in English from Northwestern University in 1960 and 1963 respectively. He taught English at the University of Illinois Urbana-Champaign, at Northwestern, and at the University of Southern California. From 1979 until his retirement in 1998, he taught English at the University of Delaware. He died at his home in Morro Bay, California, on 19 June 2026.

== Melville biography ==
Volume 1 of Parker's two-volume biography, Herman Melville: A Biography, Vol. 1, 1819-1851, Vol.2, 1851-1891, was one of two finalists for the 1997 Pulitzer Prize in Biography. Both volumes in turn won the highest award from the Association of American Publishers, the first volume in the category of Literature and Language (1997) and the second in a new category of Biography and Autobiography (2003). On September 22, 2008, at the inaugural public program of the CUNY Leon Levy Center for Biography, "An Eloquent Beginning", one of the presenters, Pulitzer Prize winner John Matteson, read aloud the first paragraph of Herman Melville: A Biography, 1819-1851, as an example of how "the opening paragraph should reflect the character of the subject, the way the music of a great aria fits the mood of the words being sung".

In 2013 Parker published Melville Biography: An Inside Narrative, a companion volume to the two-volume biography that is, in part, a memoir of the decades of collaborative research that established a documentary, archival foundation for the two-volume biography. In Melville Biography, Parker also looks at the various theoretical approaches to editing, biography, and literary criticism widely practiced in recent decades — including Marxist Theory, The New Criticism, The New Historicism, Post-Structuralism, and Deconstruction — that he believed fostered the ahistorical, antiarchival biases that likely led some critics and reviewers to publish negative critiques of the two-volume biography. The book was singled out in The New Yorker Blog as a book to "watch out for" and received accolades from the biographer Carl Rollyson in his Wall Street Journal review "The Hunt for Herman Melville".

== Editorial projects: Herman Melville ==
Parker undertook five long-term collaborative projects. He was Associate General Editor of the Northwestern-Newberry Edition of The Writings of Herman Melville for 13 volumes and is General Editor for the final two volumes, Published Poems (2009) and "Billy Budd, Sailor" and Other Uncompleted Writings (2017). He edited the 1820-1865 section of The Norton Anthology of American Literature (1979 and the next four editions); much of his work remains in the sixth edition (2007), according to Norton policy. For each of the four volumes of the edition of Melville in the Bibliothèque de la Pléiade, edited by Philippe Jaworski (1997–2010), he contributed a "Chronologie". In 1986 he began expanding Jay Leyda's chronological documentary life, The Melville Log, from 1000 pages in the 1969 edition to 9000 pages. Parker had in preparation a three-volume selection to be published by the Gordian Press with Robert A. Sandberg collaborating as design and layout editor. In addition, Parker wrote articles and books in collaboration with other scholars, most frequently with Brian Higgins, as in their Louisiana State University Press publication Reading Melville's "Pierre; or, The Ambiguities" (2006).

== Recovering lost authority in American novels ==
In the 1970s Parker pioneered the study of lost authority in standard American novels by Mark Twain, F. Scott Fitzgerald, William Faulkner, Norman Mailer and others. His work on Stephen Crane repeatedly provoked threats of lawsuits from Fredson Bowers for alleging sloppiness in both theory and practice in Bowers's Virginia Edition of Crane's works. Parker's 1984 Flawed Texts and Verbal Icons: Literary Authority in American Fiction was the first book systematically to bring biographical evidence to bear on textual theory, literary criticism, and literary theory. Frequently attacked by reviewers trained in the New Criticism as well as by proponents of the New Bibliography of W. W. Greg and Fredson Bowers, Flawed Texts and Verbal Icons nevertheless has been applied to their problems by biblical, classical, and medieval scholars as well as by critics of more modern literature. See for example Sally Bushell, Text as Process, John Van Engen, Past and Future of Medieval Studies, Alison M. Jack, Texts Reading Texts Sacred and Secular 2, Robert S. Kawashima, "Comparative Literature and Biblical Studies: The Case of Allusion", Tim William Machan, Textual Criticism and Middle English Texts, Michael J. Meyer, Literature and Music, James J. O'Hara, "Trying Not to Cheat: Responses to Inconsistencies in Roman Epic", and Peter L. Shillingsburg, Scholarly Editing in the Computer Age.

== Selected bibliography ==
- Parker, Hershel, ed. (2019), Herman Melville: Complete Poems, Library of America, 990 pp. (reviewed by Helen Vendler, The New York Review of Books, 5 December 2019, pp. 29, 32–34).
- Parker, Hershel (2013). Melville Biography: An Inside Narrative. Evanston, IL: Northwestern University Press. ISBN 978-0-8101-2709-8. OCLC 785079312.
- Parker, Hershel (2008). Melville: The Making of the Poet. Evanston, IL: Northwestern University Press. ISBN 978-0-8101-2464-6. OCLC 141484496.
- Parker, Hershel (2002). Herman Melville: A Biography. Vol. v. 2. 1851-1891. Baltimore, MD: The Johns Hopkins University Press. ISBN 0-8018-8186-2. OCLC 248147808.
- Parker, Hershel (2005) [1996]. Herman Melville: A Biography. Vol. v. 1. 1819-1851 (Paperback ed.). Baltimore, MD: The Johns Hopkins University Press. ISBN 0-8018-8185-4. OCLC 57751037.
- Higgins, Brian; Parker, Hershel, eds. (1992). Critical Essays on Herman Melville's Moby Dick. New York: G.K. Hall. ISBN 0-8161-7318-4. OCLC 25873726.
- Hayes, Kevin J.; Parker, Hershel; Mailloux, Steven (1991). Checklist of Melville Reviews (Rev. ed.). Evanston, IL: Northwestern University Press. ISBN 0-8101-1028-8. OCLC 24848270.
- Parker, Hershel (1990). Reading Billy Budd. Evanston, IL: Northwestern University Press. ISBN 0-8101-0961-1. OCLC 300702142.
- Parker, Hershel (Winter 1990). ""The New Melville Log": A Progress Report and an Appeal". Modern Language Studies. 20 (1). Susquehanna University, Selinsgrove, PA: Northeast Modern Language Association: 53–66. doi:10.2307/3195162. ISSN 0047-7729. JSTOR 3195162. OCLC 484654260.
- Parker, Hershel (1984). Flawed Texts and Verbal Icons: Literary Authority in American Fiction. Evanston, IL: Northwestern University Press. ISBN 0-8101-0666-3. OCLC 11362604.
- Higgins, Brian; Parker, Hershel, eds. (1983). Critical Essays on Herman Melville's Pierre, or, the Ambiguities. Critical Essays on American Literature. Boston, MA: G.K. Hall. ISBN 0-8161-8319-8. OCLC 9393926.
- Parker, Hershel; Hayford, Harrison (June 1970). Moby-Dick As Doubloon; Essays and Extracts, 1851-1970. A Norton Critical edition. New York: W. W. Norton & Company. ISBN 0-393-09883-4. OCLC 601909112.
- Parker, Hershel, ed. (1970) [1967]. The Recognition of Herman Melville: Selected Criticism Since 1846. Ann Arbor: University of Michigan Press. ISBN 0-472-06164-X. OCLC 3029736.
