= Herman Melville =

American writer (1819–1891)

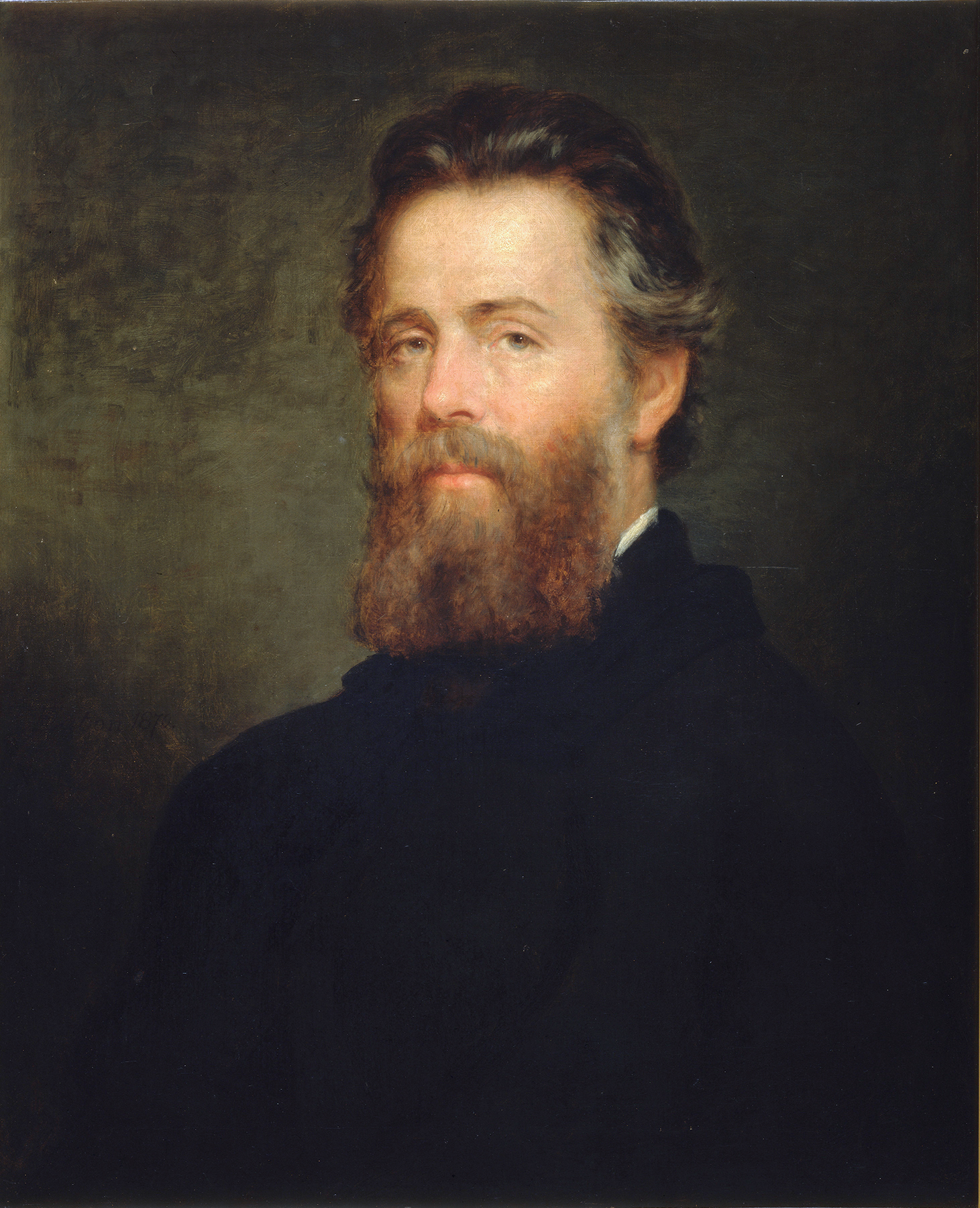
- 1870 portrait
- Born: Herman Melvill; August 1, 1819; New York City, U.S.
- Died: September 28, 1891 (aged 72); New York City, U.S.
- Resting place: Woodlawn Cemetery in The Bronx, New York
- Education: The Albany Academy (Albany, New York)
- Occupations: Writer; teacher; sailor; lecturer; customs inspector
- Spouse: Elizabeth Knapp Shaw (m. 1847)
- Children: 4
- Writing career
- Genres: Travelogue; captivity narrative; nautical fiction; gothic romanticism; allegory; tall tale
- Movement: Romanticism

Herman Melville (born Melvill; (Note: After the death of Melville's father in 1832 his mother added an "e" to the family surname—seemingly at the behest of her son Gansevoort. (Parker 1996, p. 67.)) August 1, 1819 – September 28, 1891) was an American writer of the American Renaissance period. Among his best-known works are Moby-Dick (1851), Typee (1846), a romanticized account of his experiences in Polynesia, and Billy Budd, Sailor, a posthumously published novella. At the time of his death, Melville was not well known to the public, but 1919, the centennial of his birth, was the starting point of a Melville revival. Moby-Dick would eventually be considered one of the Great American Novels.

Melville was born in New York City, the third child of a prosperous merchant whose death in 1832 left the family in dire financial straits. He took to the sea in 1839 as a common sailor on the merchant ship St. Lawrence and then in 1841, on the whaler Acushnet. However, he jumped ship in the Marquesas Islands. Typee, his first book, and its sequel, Omoo (1847), were travel adventures based on his encounters with the peoples of the islands. Their success gave him the financial security to marry Elizabeth Shaw, the daughter of Boston jurist Lemuel Shaw. Mardi (1849), a romance adventure and his first book not based on his own experience, was not well received. Redburn (1849) and White-Jacket (1850), both tales based on his experience as a well-born young man at sea, were given respectable reviews, but did not sell well enough to support his expanding family.

Melville's growing literary ambition showed in Moby-Dick (1851), which took nearly a year and a half to write, but it did not find an audience, and critics scorned his psychological novel Pierre: or, The Ambiguities (1852). From 1853 to 1856, Melville published short fiction in magazines, including "Benito Cereno" and "Bartleby, the Scrivener". In 1857, he traveled to England, toured the Near East, and published his last work of prose, The Confidence-Man (1857). He moved to New York City in 1863, eventually taking a position as a United States customs inspector.

From that point, Melville focused his creative powers on poetry. Battle-Pieces and Aspects of the War (1866) was his poetic reflection on the moral questions of the American Civil War. In 1867, his eldest child Malcolm died at home from a self-inflicted gunshot. Melville's metaphysical epic Clarel: A Poem and Pilgrimage in the Holy Land was published in 1876. In 1886, his other son Stanwix died of apparent tuberculosis, and Melville retired. During his last years, he privately published two volumes of poetry, and left one volume unpublished. The novella Billy Budd was left unfinished at the time of his death, but was published posthumously in 1924. Melville died from cardiovascular disease in 1891.

== Early life and education ==
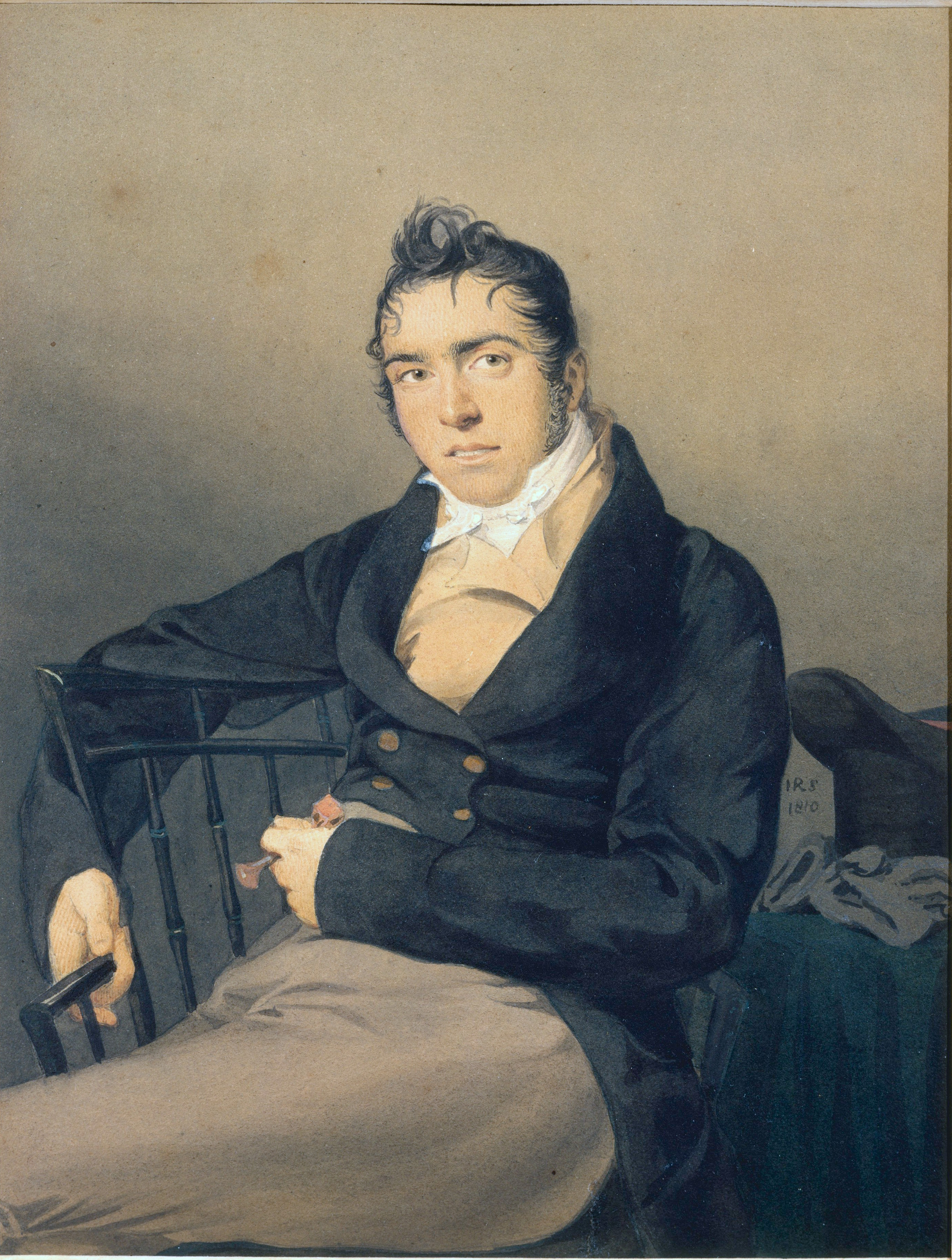
An 1810 portrait of Melville's father, Allan Melvill, by John Rubens Smith, now housed at the Metropolitan Museum of Art in New York City. In Melville's novel Pierre (1852), he fictionalized this painting as a portrait of Pierre's father.

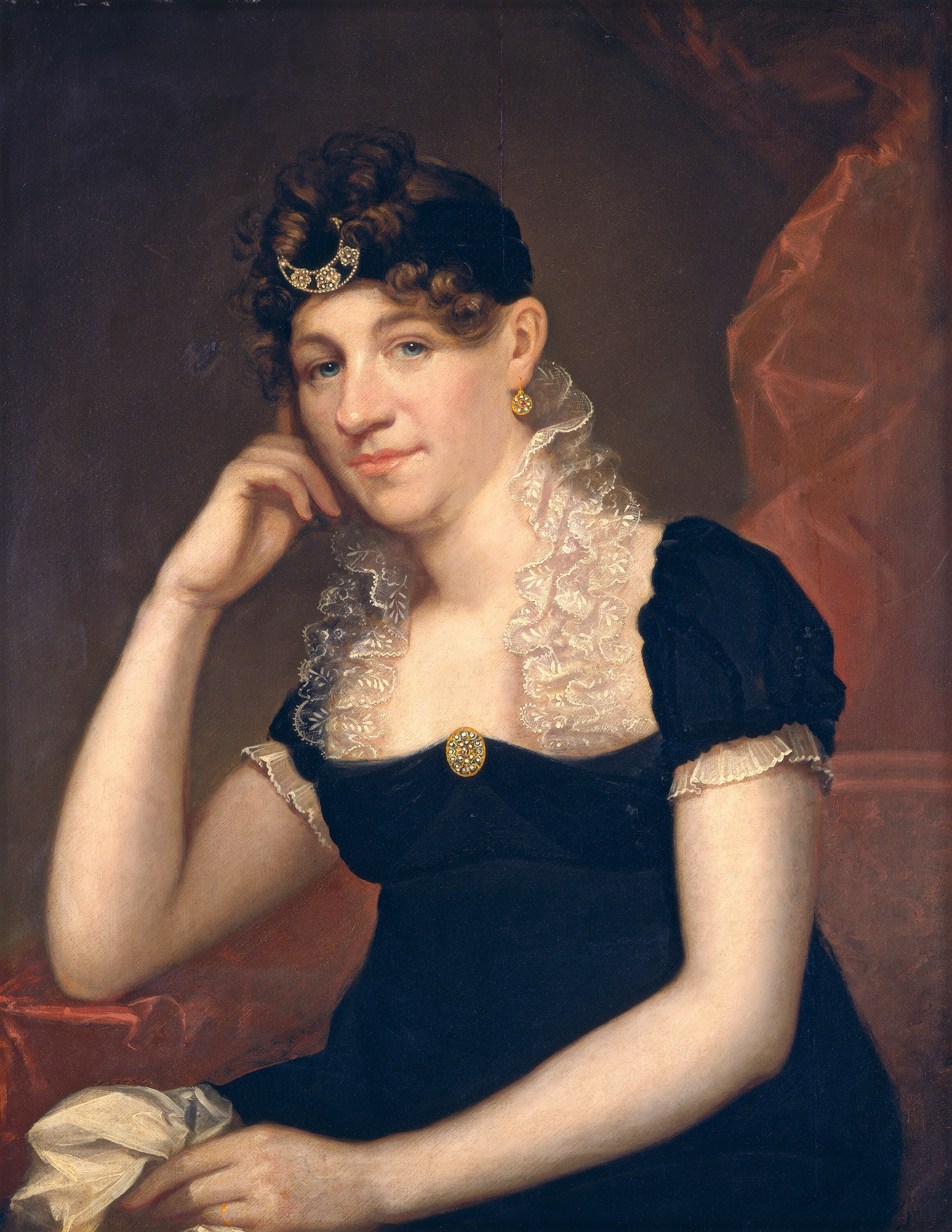
A c. 1815 portrait of Melville's mother Maria Gansevoort Melville by Ezra Ames, now on display at the National Gallery of Art

Herman Melville was born in New York City, on August 1, 1819, the third of eight children to Allan Melvill and Maria (Gansevoort) Melvill. His seven siblings, who played important roles in his career and emotional life, were Gansevoort, Helen Maria, Augusta, Allan, Catherine, Frances Priscilla, and Thomas, who eventually became a governor of Sailors' Snug Harbor. Part of a well-established and colorful Boston family, Allan Melvill spent considerable time away from New York City, travelling regularly to Europe as a commission merchant and an importer of French dry goods.

Both of Melville's grandfathers played significant roles in the American Revolutionary War, and Melville later expressed satisfaction in his "double revolutionary descent". Major Thomas Melvill participated in the Boston Tea Party, and Melville's maternal grandfather, General Peter Gansevoort, commanded the defense of Fort Stanwix in New York in 1777.

At the turn of the 19th century, Major Melvill did not send his son Allan (Herman's father) to college, but instead sent him to France, where he spent two years in Paris and learned to speak French fluently. In 1814, Allan, who subscribed to his father's Unitarianism, married Maria Gansevoort, who was committed to her family's more strict and biblically oriented Dutch Reformed version of the Calvinist creed. The Gansevoorts' severe Protestantism ensured that Maria was well versed in the Bible, in English as well as in Dutch, (Note: This would have been the Statenvertaling of 1637, the Dutch equivalent of the King James Bible.) the language that the Gansevoorts spoke at home.

On August 19, almost three weeks after his birth, Melville was baptized at home by a minister of the South Reformed Dutch Church. During the 1820s, Melville lived a privileged and opulent life in a household supported by three or more servants at a time. Every four years, the family moved to more spacious and elegant quarters, finally settling on Broadway in 1828. Allan Melvill lived beyond his means, on large sums that he borrowed from his father and from his wife's widowed mother. Although his wife's opinion of his financial conduct is unknown, biographer Hershel Parker says that Maria "thought her mother's money was infinite and that she was entitled to much of her portion" while her children were young. How well the parents managed to hide the truth from their children is "impossible to know", according to biographer Andrew Delbanco.

In 1830, the Gansevoorts ended their financial support of the Melvilles, at which point Allan's lack of financial responsibility had left him in debt to both the Melvill and Gansevoort families for a sum exceeding $20,000 (equivalent to $605,000 in 2025). But Melville biographer Newton Arvin writes that the relative happiness and comfort of Melville's early childhood depended less on Allan's wealth and profligate spending than on the "exceptionally tender and affectionate spirit in all the family relationships, especially in the immediate circle". Arvin describes Allan as "a man of real sensibility and a particularly warm and loving father," while Maria was "warmly maternal, simple, robust, and affectionately devoted to her husband and her brood".

Melville's education began when he was six. In 1824, the Melvilles moved to a newly built house at 33 Bleecker Street in Manhattan. In 1825, Herman and his brother Gansevoort enrolled in New York Male High School. In 1826, the year that Herman contracted scarlet fever, Allan Melvill described him as "very backwards in speech & somewhat slow in comprehension" at first, but his development increased its pace and Allan was surprised "that Herman proved the best Speaker in the introductory Department". In 1829, both Gansevoort and Herman transferred to Columbia Grammar and Preparatory School, and Herman enrolled in the English Department on September 28. "Herman I think is making more progress than formerly," Allan wrote in May 1830 to Major Melvill, "and without being a bright Scholar, he maintains a respectable standing, and would proceed further, if he could only be induced to study more—being a most amiable and innocent child, I cannot find it in my heart to coerce him".

Emotionally unstable and behind on paying the rent for the house on Broadway, Herman's father tried to recover by moving his family to Albany, New York, in 1830 and going into the fur business. Herman attended The Albany Academy from October 1830 to October 1831, where he took the standard preparatory course, including reading and spelling, penmanship, arithmetic, English grammar, geography, natural history, universal, Greek, Roman, and English history, classical biography, and Jewish antiquities. In early August 1831, Herman marched in the Albany city government procession of the year's "finest scholars" and was presented with a copy of The London Carcanet, a collection of poems and prose, inscribed to him as "first best in ciphering books". As Melville scholar Merton Sealts observed,

The ubiquitous classical references in Melville's published writings suggest that his study of ancient history, biography, and literature during his school days left a lasting impression on both his thought and his art, as did his almost encyclopedic knowledge of both the Old and the New Testaments.

In October 1831, Melville left the Academy. While the precise reason is not known definitively, Parker speculates it was for financial reasons, since "even the tiny tuition fee seemed too much to pay".

In December 1831, Allan Melvill returned from New York City by steamboat, but he had to travel the last 70 miles in an open carriage for two days and two nights in subfreezing temperatures. In early January, he began to show "signs of delirium", and he grew worse until his wife felt that his suffering deprived him of his intellect. On January 28, 1832, he died, two months prior to reaching his 50th birthday. Since Herman was no longer attending school, he likely witnessed his father's medical and mental deterioration. Twenty years later, Melville described a similar death in Pierre.

== Work as a clerk ==
The death of Allan caused many major shifts in the family's material and spiritual circumstances. One result was the greater influence of his mother's religious beliefs. Maria sought consolation in her faith and in April was admitted as a member of the First Reformed Dutch Church. Herman's saturation in orthodox Calvinism was surely the most decisive intellectual and spiritual influence of his early life. Two months after his father's death, Gansevoort entered the cap and fur business. Uncle Peter Gansevoort, a director of the New York State Bank, got Herman a job as clerk for $150 a year (equivalent to $4,800 in 2025). Biographers cite a passage from Redburn when trying to answer what Herman must have felt then: "I had learned to think much and bitterly before my time," the narrator remarks, adding, "I must not think of those delightful days, before my father became a bankrupt ... and we removed from the city; for when I think of those days, something rises up in my throat and almost strangles me". With Melville, Arvin argues, one has to reckon with "psychology, the tormented psychology, of the decayed patrician".

When Melville's paternal grandfather died on September 16, 1832, Maria and her children discovered Allan, somewhat unscrupulously, had borrowed more than his share of his inheritance, meaning Maria received only $20 (equivalent to $600 in 2025). His paternal grandmother died almost exactly seven months later. Melville did his job well at the bank; although he was only 14 in 1834, the bank considered him competent enough to be sent to Schenectady, New York, on an errand. Not much else is known from this period except that he was very fond of drawing. The visual arts became a lifelong interest. Around May 1834, the Melvilles moved to another house in Albany, a three-story brick house. That same month a fire destroyed Gansevoort's skin-preparing factory, which left him with personnel he could neither employ nor afford. Instead he pulled Melville out of the bank to man the cap and fur store.

== Intermittent work and studies ==
In 1835, while still working in the store, Melville enrolled in Albany Classical School, perhaps using Maria's part of the proceeds from the sale of the estate of his maternal grandmother in March 1835. In September of the following year, Herman was back at The Albany Academy, participating in the school's Latin course. He also participated in debating societies, in an apparent effort to make up as much as he could for his missed years of schooling. During this time, he read Shakespeare, including Macbeth, whose witch scenes gave him the chance to teasingly scare his sisters. By March 1837, however, he again withdrew from The Albany Academy.

Gansevoort served as a role model and support for Melville throughout his life, particularly during this time trying to cobble together an education. In early 1834, Gansevoort became a member of Albany's Young Men's Association for Mutual Improvement, and in January 1835 Melville joined him there. Gansevoort also had copies of John Todd's Index Rerum, a blank register for indexing remarkable passages from books one had read for easy retrieval. Among the sample entries that Gansevoort made showing his academic scrupulousness was "Pequot, beautiful description of the war with," with a short title reference to the place in Benjamin Trumbull's A Complete History of Connecticut (Volume I in 1797, and Volume II in 1818) in which the description could be found. The two surviving volumes of Gansevoort's are the best evidence for Melville's reading in this period. Gansevoort's entries include books Melville used for Moby-Dick and Clarel, including "Parsees—of India—an excellent description of their character, and religion and an account of their descent—East India Sketch Book p. 21". Other entries are on Panther, the pirate's cabin, and storm at sea from James Fenimore Cooper's The Red Rover.

== Career as a school teacher ==
The Panic of 1837 forced Gansevoort to file for bankruptcy in April. In June, Maria told the younger children they needed to leave Albany for somewhere cheaper. Gansevoort began studying law in New York City while Herman managed the farm before getting a teaching position at Sikes District School near Lenox, Massachusetts. He taught about 30 students of various ages, including some his own age.

The semester over, he returned to his mother in 1838. In February he was elected president of the Philo Logos Society, which Peter Gansevoort invited to move into Stanwix Hall for no rent. In the Albany Microscope in March, Melville published two polemical letters about issues in vogue in the debating societies. Historians Leon Howard and Hershel Parker suggest the motive behind the letters was a youthful desire to have his rhetorical skills publicly recognized. In May, the Melvilles moved to a rented house in Lansingburgh, almost 12 miles north of Albany. Nothing is known about what Melville did or where he went for several months after he finished teaching at Sikes. On November 12, five days after arriving in Lansingburgh, Melville paid for a term at Lansingburgh Academy to study surveying and engineering. In an April 1839 letter recommending Herman for a job in the Engineer Department of the Erie Canal, Peter Gansevoort says his nephew "possesses the ambition to make himself useful in a business which he desires to make his profession," but no job resulted.

Just weeks after this failure, Melville's first known published essay appeared. Using the initials "L.A.V.", Herman contributed "Fragments from a Writing Desk" to the weekly newspaper Democratic Press and Lansingburgh Advertiser, which printed it in two installments, the first on May 4. According to Merton Sealts, his use of heavy-handed allusions reveals familiarity with the work of William Shakespeare, John Milton, Walter Scott, Richard Brinsley Sheridan, Edmund Burke, Samuel Taylor Coleridge, Lord Byron, and Thomas Moore. Parker calls the piece "characteristic Melvillean mood-stuff" and considers its style "excessive enough [...] to indulge his extravagances and just enough overdone to allow him to deny that he was taking his style seriously". For Delbanco, the style is "overheated in the manner of Poe, with sexually charged echoes of Byron and The Arabian Nights".

== 1839–1844: Years at sea ==
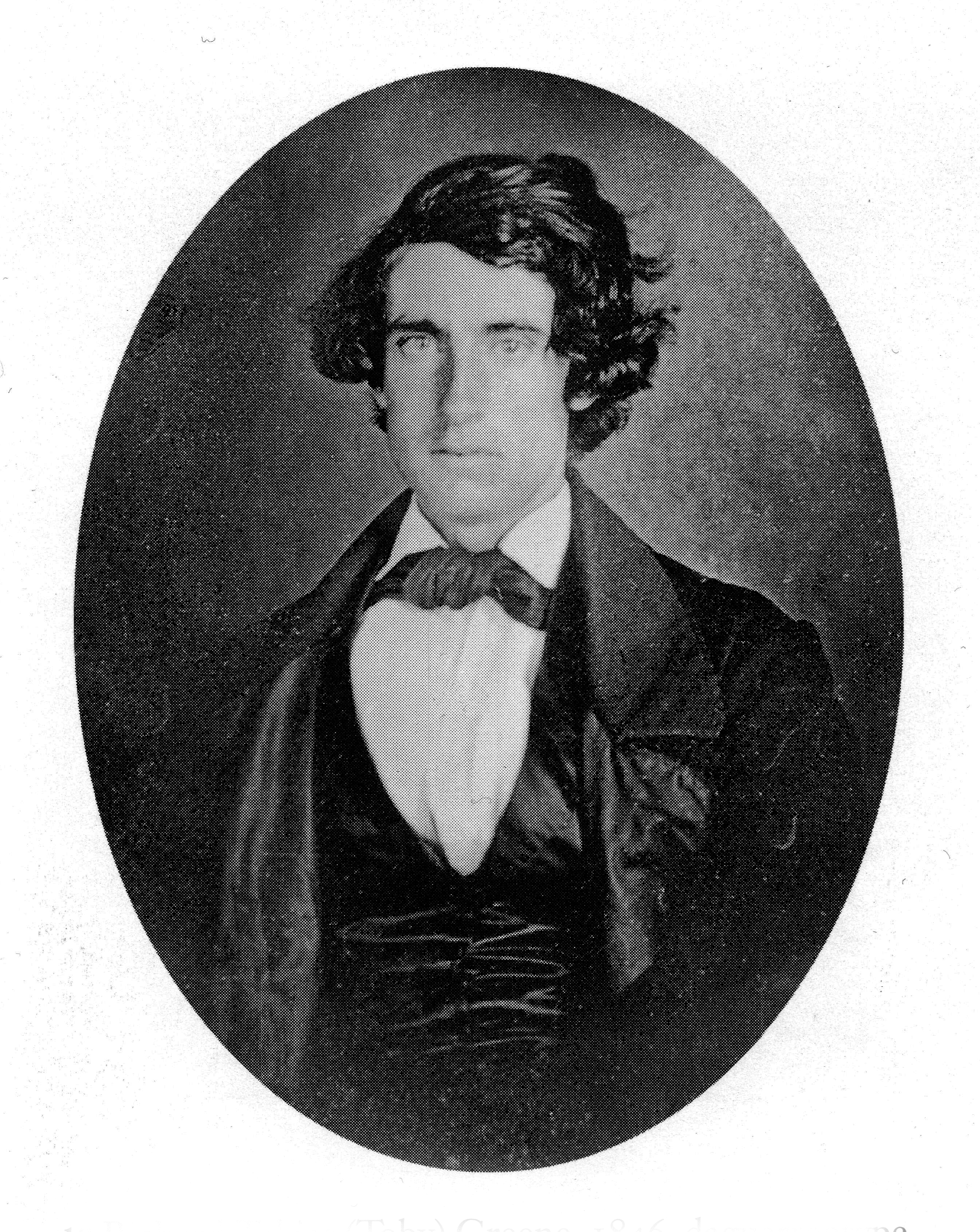
Richard Tobias Greene, who jumped ship with Melville in the Marquesas Islands and is Toby in Typee, pictured in 1846

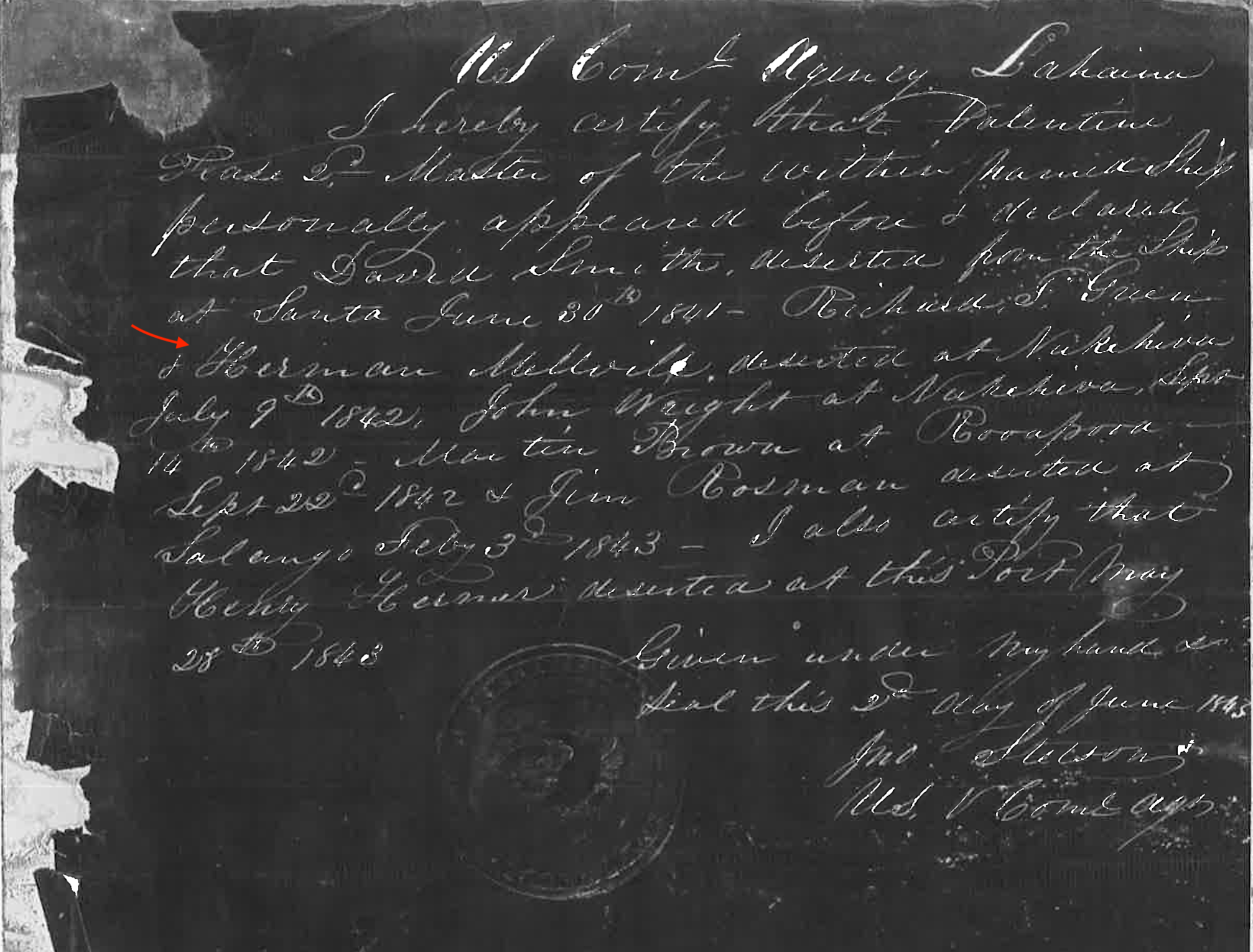
Melville's desertion from the Acushnet in 1842

On May 31, 1839, Gansevoort, then living in New York City, wrote that he was sure Herman could get a job on a whaler or merchant vessel. The next day, he signed aboard the merchant ship St. Lawrence as a "boy" (a green hand), which cruised from New York to Liverpool. Redburn: His First Voyage (1849) draws on his experiences in this journey; at least two of the nine guide-books listed in chapter 30 of the book had been part of Allan Melvill's library. He arrived back in New York October 1, 1839 and resumed teaching, now at Greenbush, New York, but left after one term because he had not been paid. In the summer of 1840 he and his friend James Murdock Fly went to Galena, Illinois, to see if his Uncle Thomas could help them find work. Unsuccessful, he and his friend returned home in autumn, likely by way of St. Louis and up the Ohio River.

Inspired by seafaring stories, including Richard Henry Dana Jr.'s new book Two Years Before the Mast and Jeremiah N. Reynolds's account in the May 1839 issue of The Knickerbocker magazine of the hunt for a great white sperm whale named Mocha Dick, Herman and Gansevoort traveled to New Bedford, where Herman signed up for a whaling voyage aboard a new ship, the Acushnet. Built in 1840, the ship measured some 104 feet in length, almost 28 feet (8.5 m) in breadth, and almost 14 feet in depth. She measured slightly less than 360 tons and had two decks and three masts, but no quarter galleries. The Acushnet was owned by Melvin O. Bradford and Philemon Fuller of Fairhaven, Massachusetts, and was berthed near their office at the foot of Center Street in that town. Herman signed a contract on Christmas Day with the ship's agent as a "green hand" for 1/175th of whatever profits the voyage would yield. On Sunday the 27th, the brothers heard Reverend Enoch Mudge preach at the Seamen's Bethel on Johnnycake Hill, where white marble cenotaphs on the walls memorialized local sailors who had died at sea, often in battle with whales. When he signed the crew list the next day, Herman was advanced $84.

On January 3, 1841, the Acushnet set sail. (Note: On the surviving list of Acushnet crewmembers, Melville's name can be seen sixth counting from below: Original list of Acushnet crewmembers) Melville slept with some twenty others in the forecastle; Captain Valentine Pease, the mates, and the skilled men slept aft. Whales were found near The Bahamas, and in March 150 barrels of oil were sent home from Rio de Janeiro. Cutting in and trying-out (boiling) a single whale took about three days, and a whale yielded approximately one barrel of oil per foot of length and per ton of weight (the average whale weighed 40 to 60 tons). The oil was kept on deck for a day to cool off, and was then stowed down; scrubbing the deck completed the labor. An average voyage meant that some forty whales were killed to yield some 1600 barrels of oil.

On April 15, the Acushnet sailed around Cape Horn and traveled to the South Pacific, where the crew sighted whales without catching any. She then went up the coast of Chile to the region of Selkirk Island, and on May 7, near Juan Fernández Islands, she had 160 barrels. On June 23, the ship anchored for the first time since Rio, in Santa Harbor. The cruising grounds the Acushnet was sailing attracted much traffic, and Captain Pease not only paused to visit other whalers, but at times hunted in company with them. From July 23 into August, the Acushnet regularly gammed with the Lima from Nantucket, and Melville met William Henry Chase, the son of Owen Chase, who gave him a copy of his father's account of his adventures aboard the Essex. Ten years later, Melville wrote in his other copy of the book: "The reading of this wondrous story upon the landless sea, & close to the very latitude of the shipwreck had a surprising effect upon me".

On September 25, the ship reported having 600 barrels of oil to another whaler, and in October 700 barrels. (Note: This number is either what she was carrying or the total number since the voyage began (Parker, 1996), 200.) On October 24, the Acushnet crossed the equator to the north, and six or seven days later arrived at the Galápagos Islands. This short visit would be the basis for "The Encantadas". On November 2, the Acushnet and three other American whalers were hunting together near the Galápagos Islands; Melville later exaggerated that number in Sketch Fourth of "The Encantadas". From November 19 to 25, the ship anchored at Chatham's Isle, and on December 2 reached the coast of Peru and anchored at Tumbes, near Paita, with 570 barrels of oil on board. On December 27, the Acushnet sighted Cape Blanco, off Ecuador. Point St. Elena was sighted the next day, and on January 6, 1842, the ship approached the Galápagos Islands from the southeast. From February 13 to May 7, seven sightings of sperm whales were recorded, but none were killed. From early May to early June, the Acushnet cooperatively set about its whaling endeavors several times with the Columbus of New Bedford, which also took letters from Melville's ship; the two ships were in the same area just south of the Equator. On June 16, the Acushnet carried 750 barrels of oil and sent home 200 on the Herald the Second, and, on June 23, she reached the Marquesas Islands and anchored at Nuku Hiva.

In the summer of 1842, Melville and his shipmate Richard Tobias Greene ("Toby") jumped ship at Nuku Hiva Bay. Melville's first book, Typee (1846), is based on his stay in or near the Taipi Valley. By around mid-August, Melville had left the island aboard the Australian whaler Lucy Ann, bound for Tahiti, where he took part in a mutiny and was briefly jailed in the native Calabooza Beretanee. In October, he and crew mate John B. Troy escaped Tahiti for Eimeo. He then spent a month as beachcomber and island rover ("omoo" in Tahitian), eventually crossing over to Moorea. He drew on these experiences for Omoo, the sequel to Typee. In November, he contracted to be a seaman on the Nantucket whaler Charles & Henry for a six-month cruise (November 1842 – April 1843), and was discharged at Lahaina, Maui, in the Hawaiian Islands, in May 1843.

After four months of working several jobs in Hawaii, including as a clerk, Melville joined the U.S. Navy on August 20, as an ordinary seaman on the frigate USS United States. During the next year, the homeward bound ship visited the Marquesas Islands, Tahiti, and Valparaiso, and then, from summer to fall 1844, Mazatlan, Lima, and Rio de Janeiro, before reaching Boston on October 3. Melville was discharged on October 14. This Navy experience is used in White-Jacket (1850), Melville's fifth book.

Melville's wander-years created what biographer Arvin calls "a settled hatred of external authority, a lust for personal freedom", and a "growing and intensifying sense of his own exceptionalism as a person", along with "the resentful sense that circumstance and mankind together had already imposed their will upon him in a series of injurious ways". Scholar Robert Milder believes the encounter with the wide ocean, where he was seemingly abandoned by God, led Melville to experience a "metaphysical estrangement" and influenced his social views in two ways: first, that he belonged to the genteel classes, but sympathized with the "disinherited commons" he had been placed among and, second, that experiencing the cultures of Polynesia let him view the West from an outsider's perspective.

== 1845–1850: Successful writer ==
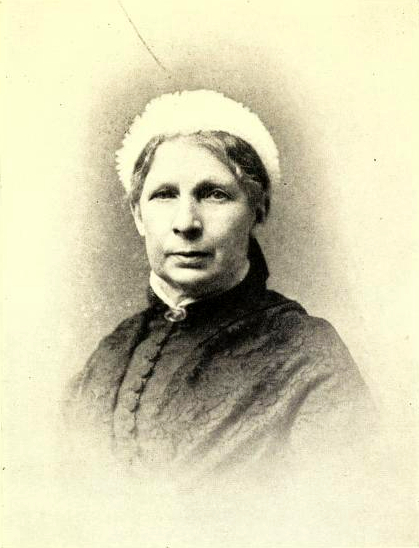
Elizabeth "Lizzie" Shaw Melville, Melville's wife, in 1885

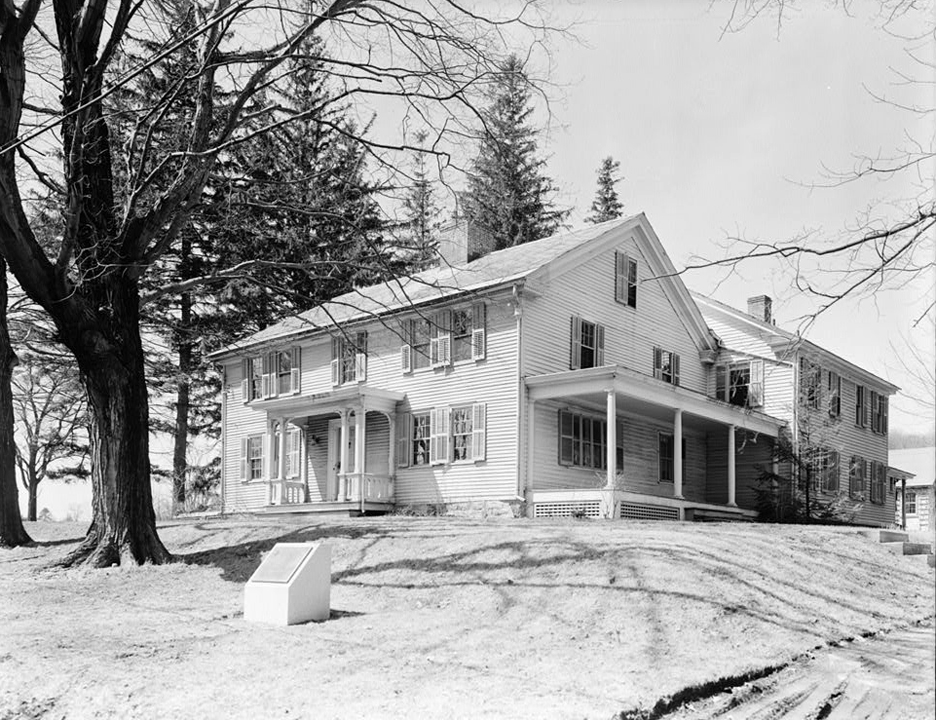
Melville's home Arrowhead in Pittsfield, Massachusetts

Upon his return, Melville regaled his family and friends with his adventurous tales and romantic experiences, and they urged him to put them into writing. Melville completed Typee, his first book, in the summer of 1845 while living in Troy, New York. His brother Gansevoort found a publisher for it in London, where it was published in February 1846 by John Murray in his travel adventure series. It became an overnight bestseller in England, then in New York, when it was published on March 17 by Wiley & Putnam.

In the narrative, Melville likely extended the period of time he had spent on the island and also incorporated material from source books he had assembled. Milder calls Typee "an appealing mixture of adventure, anecdote, ethnography, and social criticism presented with a genial latitudinarianism that gave novelty to a South Sea idyll at once erotically suggestive and romantically chaste".

An unsigned review in the Salem Advertiser written by Nathaniel Hawthorne called the book a "skilfully managed" narrative by an author with "that freedom of view ... which renders him tolerant of codes of morals that may be little in accordance with our own". Hawthorne continued:

This book is lightly but vigorously written; and we are acquainted with no work that gives a freer and more effective picture of barbarian life, in that unadulterated state of which there are now so few specimens remaining. The gentleness of disposition that seems akin to the delicious climate, is shown in contrast with the traits of savage fierceness...He has that freedom of view—it would be too harsh to call it laxity of principle—which renders him tolerant of codes of morals that may be little in accordance with our own, a spirit proper enough to a young and adventurous sailor, and which makes his book the more wholesome to our staid landsmen.

Pleased but not overwhelmed by the adulation of his new public, Melville later expressed concern that he would "go down to posterity ... as a 'man who lived among the cannibals'!" The writing of Typee brought Melville back into contact with his friend Greene—Toby in the book—who wrote confirming Melville's account in newspapers. The two corresponded until 1863, and in his final years Melville "traced and successfully located his old friend" for a further meeting of the two. In March 1847, Omoo, a sequel to Typee, was published by Murray in London, and in May by Harper in New York. Omoo is "a slighter but more professional book," according to Milder. Typee and Omoo gave Melville overnight renown as a writer and adventurer, and he often entertained by telling stories to his admirers. As the writer and editor Nathaniel Parker Willis wrote, "With his cigar and his Spanish eyes, he talks Typee and Omoo, just as you find the flow of his delightful mind on paper".

In 1847, Melville tried unsuccessfully to find a "government job" in Washington.

In June 1847, Melville and Elizabeth "Lizzie" Knapp Shaw were engaged, after knowing each other for approximately three months. Melville had first asked her father, Lemuel Shaw, for her hand in March, but was turned down at the time. Shaw, Chief Justice of Massachusetts, had been a close friend of Melville's father, and Shaw's marriage with Melville's aunt Nancy was prevented only by her death. His warmth and financial support for the family continued after Allan's death. Melville dedicated his first book, Typee, to him. Lizzie was raised by her grandmother and an Irish nurse. Arvin suggests that Melville's interest in Lizzie may have been stimulated by "his need of Judge Shaw's paternal presence". They were married on August 4, 1847. Lizzie described their marriage as "very unexpected, and scarcely thought of until about two months before it actually took place". She wanted to be married in church, but they had a private wedding ceremony at home to avoid possible crowds hoping to see the celebrity. The couple honeymooned in the then-British Province of Canada, and traveled to Montreal. They settled in a house on Fourth Avenue in New York City (now called Park Avenue).

According to scholars Joyce Deveau Kennedy and Frederick James Kennedy, Lizzie brought to their marriage a sense of religious obligation, an intent to make a home with Melville regardless of place, a willingness to please her husband by performing such "tasks of drudgery" as mending stockings, an ability to hide her agitation, and a desire "to shield Melville from unpleasantness". The Kennedys conclude that "If the ensuing years did bring regrets to Melville's life, it is impossible to believe he would have regretted marrying Elizabeth. In fact, he must have realized that he could not have borne the weight of those years unaided—that without her loyalty, intelligence, and affection, his own wild imagination would have had no "port or haven".

Biographer Robertson-Lorant cites "Lizzie's adventurous spirit and abundant energy," and she suggests that "her pluck and good humor might have been what attracted Melville to her, and vice versa". An example of such good humor appears in a letter about her not yet used to being married: "It seems sometimes exactly as if I were here for a visit. The illusion is quite dispelled however when Herman stalks into my room without even the ceremony of knocking, bringing me perhaps a button to sew on, or some equally romantic occupation". On February 16, 1849, the Melvilles' first child, Malcolm, was born.

In March 1848, Mardi was published by Richard Bentley in London, and in April by Harper in New York. Nathaniel Hawthorne thought it a rich book "with depths here and there that compel a man to swim for his life". According to Milder, the book began as another South Sea story but, as he wrote, Melville left that genre behind, first in favor of "a romance of the narrator Taji and the lost maiden Yillah," and then "to an allegorical voyage of the philosopher Babbalanja and his companions through the imaginary archipelago of Mardi".

In October 1849, Redburn was published by Bentley in London, and in November by Harper in New York. The bankruptcy and death of Allan Melvill, and Melville's own youthful humiliations, surface in this "story of outward adaptation and inner impairment". Biographer Robertson-Lorant regards the work as a deliberate attempt for popular appeal: "Melville modeled each episode almost systematically on every genre that was popular with some group of antebellum readers," combining elements of "the picaresque novel, the travelogue, the nautical adventure, the sentimental novel, the sensational French romance, the gothic thriller, temperance tracts, urban reform literature, and the English pastoral". His next novel, White-Jacket, was published by Bentley in London in January 1850, and in March by Harper in New York.

== 1850–1851: Hawthorne and Moby-Dick ==
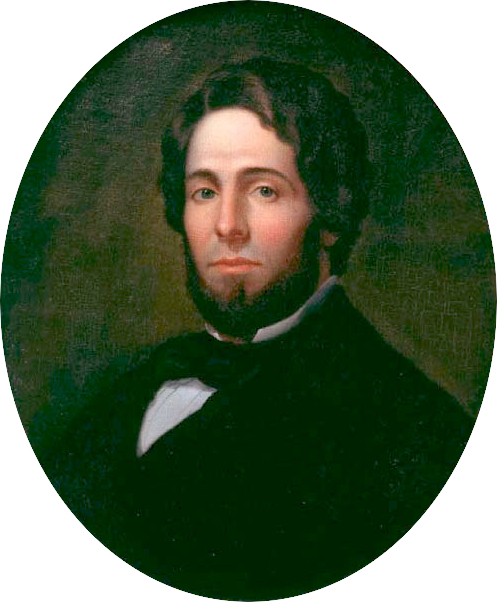
Melville depicted in an oil painting, c. 1846–47

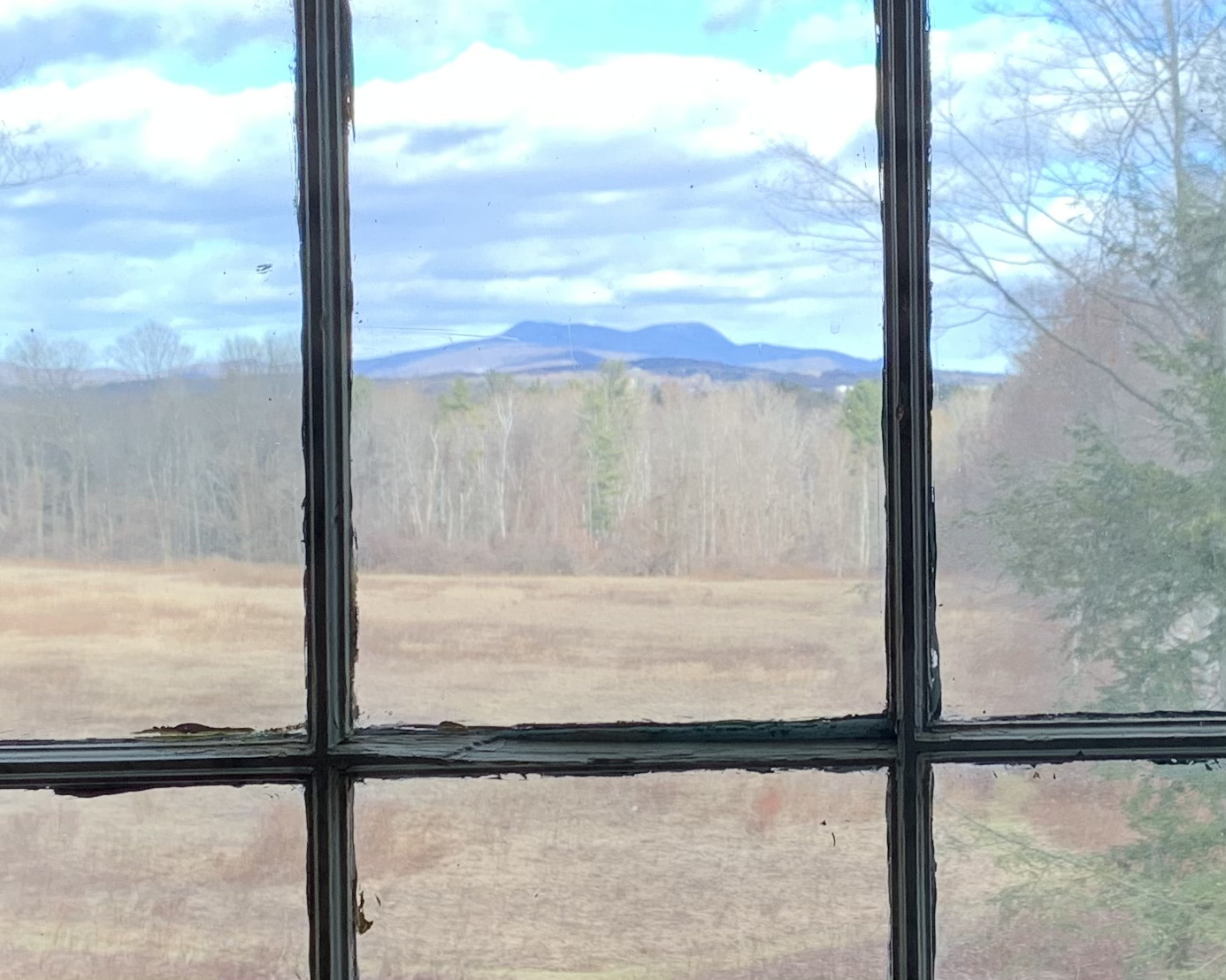
Mount Greylock, the highest elevation in Massachusetts, as seen from Melville's writing desk in Pittsfield

The earliest surviving mention of Moby-Dick is from a May 1, 1850, letter in which Melville told fellow sea author Richard Henry Dana Jr. "I am half way in the work." In June, he described the book to his English publisher as "a romance of adventure, founded upon certain wild legends in the Southern Sperm Whale Fisheries," and promised it would be done by the fall. The original manuscript has not survived. That summer, Melville read Thomas Carlyle, borrowing copies of Sartor Resartus (1833–34) and On Heroes, Hero-Worship, & the Heroic in History (1841) from the library of his friend Evert Duyckinck. These readings proved significant, occurring as Melville radically transformed his initial plan for the novel over the next several months, conceiving what Delbanco described in 2005 as "the most ambitious book ever conceived by an American writer".

From August 4 to 12, 1850, the Melvilles, Sarah Morewood, Duyckinck, Oliver Wendell Holmes, and other literary figures from New York City and Boston came to Pittsfield, Massachusetts, to enjoy a period of parties, picnics, and dinners. Nathaniel Hawthorne and his publisher James T. Fields joined the group while Hawthorne's wife stayed at home to look after the children. On one picnic outing organized by Duyckinck, Hawthorne and Melville sought shelter from the rain together and had a deep, private conversation. Melville had been given a copy of Hawthorne's short story collection Mosses from an Old Manse, though he had not yet read it. Melville then avidly read it and wrote a review, "Hawthorne and His Mosses", which appeared in two installments, on August 17 and 24, in The Literary World. Melville wrote that these stories revealed a dark side to Hawthorne, "shrouded in blackness, ten times black". He repeatedly compared Hawthorne to Shakespeare, and urged that "men not very much inferior to Shakespeare are this day being born on the banks of the Ohio." The critic Walter Bezanson finds the essay "so deeply related to Melville's imaginative and intellectual world while writing Moby-Dick" that it could be regarded as a virtual preface and should be "everybody's prime piece of contextual reading". Later that summer, Duyckinck sent Hawthorne copies of Melville's three most recent books. Hawthorne read them, as he wrote to Duyckinck on August 29 that Melville in Redburn and White-Jacket put the reality "more unflinchingly" before his reader than any writer, and he thought Mardi was "a rich book, with depths here and there that compel a man to swim for his life". But he cautioned, "It is so good that one scarcely pardons the writer for not having brooded long over it, so as to make it a great deal better".

In September 1850, Melville borrowed three thousand dollars from his father-in-law Lemuel Shaw to buy a 160-acre farm in Pittsfield. Melville called his new home Arrowhead because of the arrowheads that were dug up around the property during planting season. That winter, Melville paid Hawthorne an unexpected visit, only to discover he was working and "not in the mood for company". Hawthorne's wife Sophia gave him copies of Twice-Told Tales and, for Malcolm, The Grandfather's Chair. Melville invited them to visit Arrowhead soon, hoping to "[discuss] the Universe with a bottle of brandy & cigars" with Hawthorne, but Hawthorne would not stop working on his new book for more than one day and they did not come. After a second visit from Melville, Hawthorne surprised him by arriving at Arrowhead with his daughter Una. According to Robertson-Lorant, "The handsome Hawthorne made quite an impression on the Melville women, especially Augusta, who was a great fan of his books". They spent the day mostly "smoking and talking metaphysics".

Robertson-Lorant writes that Melville was "infatuated with Hawthorne's intellect, captivated by his artistry, and charmed by his elusive personality," but "the friendship meant something different to each of them," with Hawthorne offering Melville "the kind of intellectual stimulation he needed". They may have been "natural allies and friends," yet they were also "fifteen years apart in age and temperamentally quite different" and Hawthorne "found Melville's manic intensity exhausting at times". Bezanson identifies "sexual excitement" in all the ten letters Melville wrote to the older man. In the essay on Hawthorne's Mosses, Melville wrote: "I feel that this Hawthorne has dropped germinous seeds into my soul. He expands and deepens down, the more I contemplate him; and further, and further, shoots his strong New-England roots into the hot soil of my Southern soul." Melville dedicated his book to Hawthorne: "In token of my admiration for his genius, this book is inscribed to Nathaniel Hawthorne".

On October 18, 1851, The Whale was published in Britain in three volumes, and on November 14 Moby-Dick appeared in the United States as a single volume. In between these dates, on October 22, 1851, the Melvilles' second child, Stanwix, was born. In December, Hawthorne told Duyckinck, "What a book Melville has written! It gives me an idea of much greater power than his preceding ones." Unlike other contemporaneous reviewers of Melville, Hawthorne had seen the uniqueness of Melville's new novel and acknowledged it. In early December 1852, Melville visited the Hawthornes in Concord and discussed the idea of the "Agatha" story he had talked of with Hawthorne. This was the last contact between the two writers before Melville visited Hawthorne in Liverpool four years later when Hawthorne had relocated to England.

== 1852–1857: Unsuccessful writer ==
After having borrowed three thousand dollars from his father-in-law in September 1850 to buy a 160-acre farm in Pittsfield, Massachusetts, Melville had high hopes that his next book would please the public and restore his finances. In April 1851 he told his British publisher, Richard Bentley, that his new book had "unquestionable novelty" and was calculated to have wide appeal with elements of romance and mystery. In fact, Pierre: or, The Ambiguities was heavily psychological, though drawing on the conventions of the romance, and difficult in style. It was not well received. The New York Day Book published a venomous attack on September 8, 1852, headlined "HERMAN MELVILLE CRAZY". The item, offered as a news story, reported,

A critical friend, who read Melville's last book, Ambiguities, between two steamboat accidents, told us that it appeared to be composed of the ravings and reveries of a madman. We were somewhat startled at the remark, but still more at learning, a few days after, that Melville was really supposed to be deranged, and that his friends were taking measures to place him under treatment. We hope one of the earliest precautions will be to keep him stringently secluded from pen and ink.

On May 22, 1853, Melville's third child and first daughter Elizabeth (Bessie) was born, and on or about that day Herman finished work on the Agatha story, Isle of the Cross. Melville traveled to New York to discuss a book, presumably Isle of the Cross, with his publisher, but later wrote that Harper & Brothers was "prevented" from publishing his manuscript because it was lost.

After the commercial and critical failure of Pierre, Melville had difficulty finding a publisher for his follow-up novel Israel Potter. Instead, this narrative of a Revolutionary War veteran was serialized in Putnam's Monthly Magazine in 1853. From November 1853 to 1856, Melville published fourteen tales and sketches in Putnam's and Harper's magazines. In December 1855 he proposed to Dix & Edwards, the new owners of Putnam's, that they publish a selective collection of the short fiction. The collection, titled The Piazza Tales, was named after a new introductory story Melville wrote for it, "The Piazza". It also contained five previously published stories, including "Bartleby, the Scrivener" and "Benito Cereno". On March 2, 1855, the Melvilles' fourth child, Frances (Fanny), was born. In this period, his book Israel Potter was published.

The writing of The Confidence-Man put great strain on Melville, leading Sam Shaw, a nephew of Lizzie, to write to his uncle Lemuel Shaw: "Herman I hope has had no more of those ugly attacks"—a reference to what Robertson-Lorant calls "the bouts of rheumatism and sciatica that plagued Melville". Melville's father-in-law apparently shared his daughter's "great anxiety about him" when he wrote a letter to a cousin, in which he described Melville's working habits: "When he is deeply engaged in one of his literary works, he confines him[self] to hard study many hours in the day, with little or no exercise, and this specially in winter for a great many days together. He probably thus overworks himself and brings on severe nervous affections". Shaw advanced Melville $1,500 from Lizzie's inheritance to travel four or five months in Europe and the Holy Land.

From October 11, 1856, to May 20, 1857, Melville made a six-month Grand Tour of Europe and the Mediterranean. While in England, in November 1856, he briefly reunited for three days with Hawthorne, who had taken the position of United States Consul at Liverpool, at that time the hub of Britain's Atlantic trade. At the nearby coast resort of Southport, amid the sand dunes where they had stopped to smoke cigars, they had a conversation that Hawthorne later described in his journal:

Melville, as he always does, began to reason of Providence and futurity, and of everything that lies beyond human ken, and informed me that he 'pretty much made up his mind to be annihilated' [...] If he were a religious man, he would be one of the most truly religious and reverential; he has a very high and noble nature, and better worth immortality than most of us.

The Mediterranean part of the tour took in the Holy Land, which inspired his epic poem Clarel. During the tour he visited Mount Hope, a Christian farm near Jaffa. On April 1, 1857, Melville published his last full-length novel, The Confidence-Man. This novel, subtitled His Masquerade, has won general acclaim in modern times as a complex and mysterious exploration of issues of fraud and honesty, identity and masquerade. However, when it was published, it received reviews ranging from the bewildered to the denunciatory.

== 1857–1876: Poet ==
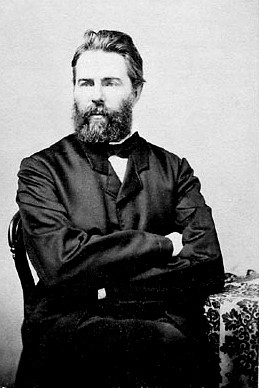
Melville in 1861

To repair his faltering finances, Melville took up public lecturing from late 1857 to 1860. He embarked upon three lecture tours and spoke at lyceums, chiefly on Roman statuary and sightseeing in Rome. Melville's lectures, which mocked the pseudo-intellectualism of lyceum culture, were panned by contemporary audiences. On May 30, 1860, Melville boarded the clipper Meteor for California, with his brother Thomas at the helm. After a shaky trip around Cape Horn, Melville returned to New York alone via Panama in November. Later that year, he submitted a poetry collection to a publisher but it was not accepted, and is now lost. In 1863, he bought his brother's house at 104 East 26th Street in New York City and moved there.

In 1864, Melville visited the Virginia battlefields of the American Civil War. After the war, he published Battle-Pieces and Aspects of the War (1866), a collection of 72 poems that has been described as "a polyphonic verse journal of the conflict". The work did not do well commercially—of the print run of 1,260 copies, 300 were sent as review copies, and 551 copies were sold—and reviewers did not realize that Melville had purposely avoided the ostentatious diction and fine writing that were in fashion, choosing to be concise and spare.

In 1866, Melville became a customs inspector for New York City. He held the post for 19 years and had a reputation for honesty in a notoriously corrupt institution. (Unbeknownst to Melville, his position was sometimes protected by future American president Chester A. Arthur, then a customs official who admired Melville's writing but never spoke to him.) During these years, Melville suffered from nervous exhaustion, physical pain, and frustration, and would sometimes, in the words of Robertson-Lorant, behave like the "tyrannical captains he had portrayed in his novels", perhaps even beating his wife Lizzie when he came home after drinking. In 1867 Malcolm, the Melvilles' older son, died in his bedroom at home at the age of 18 from a self-inflicted gun shot, perhaps intentional, perhaps accidental. In May 1867, Lizzie's brother Sam, who shared his family's fear for Melville's sanity, tried to arrange for her to leave Melville. Lizzie was to visit her family in Boston and assert to a court that her husband was insane. But Lizzie, whether to avoid the social shame divorce carried at the time or because she still loved her husband, refused to go along with the plan.

Though Melville's professional writing career had ended, he remained dedicated to his writing. He spent years on what Milder called "his autumnal masterpiece" Clarel: A Poem and a Pilgrimage (1876), an 18,000-line epic poem inspired by his 1856 trip to the Holy Land. It is among the longest single poems in American literature. The title character is a young American student of divinity who travels to Jerusalem to renew his faith. One of the central characters, Rolfe, is similar to Melville in his younger days, a seeker and adventurer, while the reclusive Vine is loosely based on Hawthorne, who had died twelve years before. Publication of 350 copies was funded with a bequest from his uncle in 1876, but sales failed miserably and the unsold copies were burned when Melville was unable to buy them at cost. Critic Lewis Mumford found an unread copy in the New York Public Library in 1925 "with its pages uncut".

== 1877–1891: Final years ==
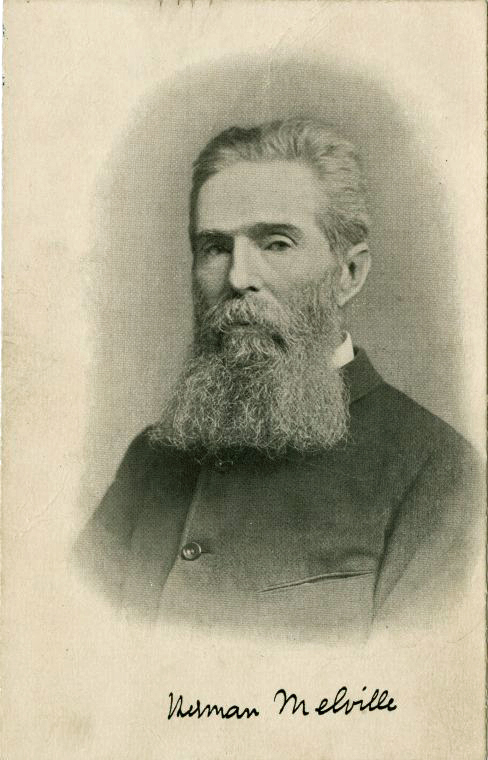
The last known image of Melville, a cabinet card by George G. Rockwood in 1885

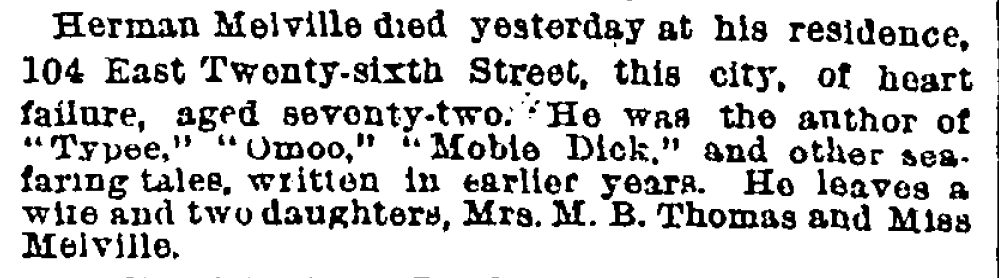
The New York Times' September 29, 1891, obituary notice, which misspelled Melville's masterpiece as Mobie Dick

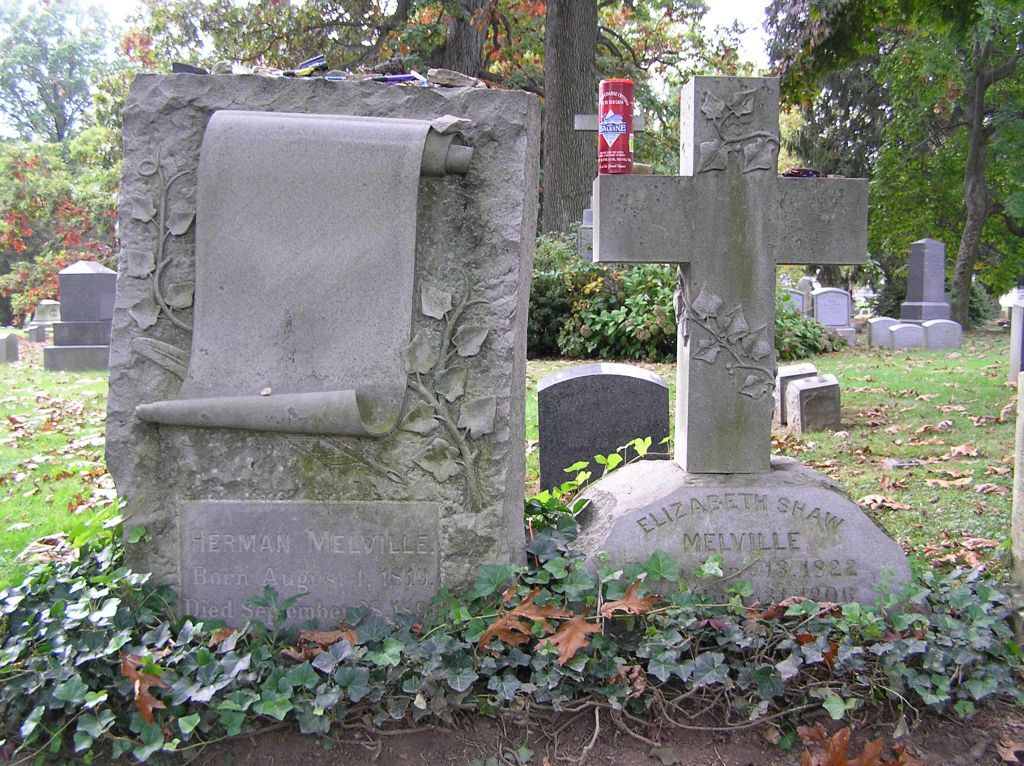
The gravestones of Melville and his wife in Woodlawn Cemetery in the Bronx, New York City

Melville's own income remained limited. But in 1884, Lizzie received a legacy that enabled him to buy a steady stream of books and prints each month. Melville retired on December 31, 1885, after several of his wife's relatives further supported the couple with supplementary legacies and inheritances. On February 22, 1886, Stanwix, their younger son, died in San Francisco at age 36, from tuberculosis. In 1889, Melville became a member of the New York Society Library.

Melville had a modest revival of popularity in England when readers rediscovered his novels. He published two collections of poems inspired by his early experiences at sea, with prose head notes. Intended for his relatives and friends, each had a print run of 25 copies. The first, John Marr and Other Sailors, was published in 1888, followed by Timoleon in 1891.

Melville died on the morning of September 28, 1891. His death certificate shows "cardiac dilation" as the cause. He was interred at Woodlawn Cemetery in the Bronx, New York City.

The New York Times' initial death notice called his masterpiece "Mobie Dick", the misspelling of which was later erroneously taken to mean that he was unappreciated at his time of death. But there were some appreciations. The Times, for instance, published a substantial article of appreciation on October 2. The author said that thinking back to Melville's books that were so much read forty years earlier, there is "no difficulty determining why they were then read and talked about," but the difficulty is "to discover why they are read and talked about no longer."

Melville left a volume of poetry, Weeds and Wildings, and a sketch, "Daniel Orme", unpublished at the time of his death. His wife also found pages for an unfinished novella, titled Billy Budd. Melville had revised and rearranged the manuscript in several stages, leaving the pages in disarray. Lizzie could not decide her husband's intentions (or even read his handwriting in some places) and abandoned attempts to edit the manuscript for publication. The pages were stored in a family breadbox until 1919 when Melville's granddaughter gave them to Raymond Weaver. Weaver, who initially dismissed the work's importance, published a quick transcription in 1924. This version, however, contained many misreadings, some of which affected interpretation. It was an immediate critical success in England, then in the United States. It was adapted as a stage play on Broadway in 1951, then an opera, and in 1961 as a film. In 1962, the Melville scholars Harrison Hayford and Merton M. Sealts published a critical reading text that was widely accepted.

== Writing style ==
=== General narrative style ===
Melville's writing style shows both consistencies and enormous changes throughout the years. His development "had been abnormally postponed, and when it came, it came with a rush and a force that had the menace of quick exhaustion in it". As early as "Fragments from a Writing Desk", written when Melville was 20, scholar Sealts sees "a number of elements that anticipate Melville's later writing, especially his characteristic habit of abundant literary allusion". Typee and Omoo were documentary adventures that called for a division of the narrative in short chapters. Such compact organization bears the risk of fragmentation when applied to a lengthy work such as Mardi, but with Redburn and White Jacket, Melville turned the short chapter into a concentrated narrative.

Some chapters of Moby-Dick are no more than two pages in standard editions, and an extreme example is Chapter 122, consisting of a single paragraph of 36 words. The skillful handling of chapters in Moby-Dick is one of the most fully developed Melvillean signatures, and is a measure of his masterly writing style (something that would lend lasting significance to the opening lines "Call me Ishmael"). Individual chapters have become "a touchstone for appreciation of Melville's art and for explanation" of his themes. In contrast, the chapters in Pierre, called Books, are divided into short-numbered sections, seemingly an "odd formal compromise" between Melville's natural length and his purpose to write a regular romance that called for longer chapters. As satirical elements were introduced, the chapter arrangement restores "some degree of organization and pace from the chaos". The usual chapter unit then reappears for Israel Potter, The Confidence-Man and even Clarel, but only becomes "a vital part in the whole creative achievement" again in the juxtaposition of accents and of topics in Billy Budd.

Newton Arvin points out that only superficially the books after Mardi seem as if Melville's writing went back to the vein of his first two books. In reality, his movement "was not a retrograde but a spiral one", and while Redburn and White Jacket may lack the spontaneous, youthful charm of his first two books, they are "denser in substance, richer in feeling, tauter, more complex, more connotative in texture and imagery". The rhythm of the prose in Omoo "achieves little more than easiness; the language is almost neutral and without idiosyncrasy", while Redburn shows an improved ability in narrative, which fuses imagery and emotion.

Melville's early works were "increasingly baroque" in style, and with Moby-Dick Melville's vocabulary had grown superabundant. Walter Bezanson calls it an "immensely varied style". According to critic Warner Berthoff, three characteristic uses of language can be recognized. First, the exaggerated repetition of words, as in the series "pitiable", "pity", "pitied", and "piteous". A second typical device is the use of unusual adjective-noun combinations, as in "concentrating brow" and "immaculate manliness". A third characteristic is the presence of a participial modifier to emphasize and to reinforce the already established expectations of the reader, as the words "preluding" and "foreshadowing" ("so still and subdued and yet somehow preluding was all the scene ..." "In this foreshadowing interval ...").

I tell you it will be more tolerable for the Feegee that salted down a lean missionary in his cellar against a coming famine; it will be more tolerable for that provident Feegee, I say, in the day of judgment, than for thee, civilized and enlightened gourmand, who nailest geese to the ground and feastest on their bloated livers in thy paté-de-foie-gras.

— Melville paraphrases the Bible in "The Whale as a Dish", Moby-Dick Chapter 65

After his use of hyphenated compounds in Pierre, Melville's writing gives Berthoff the impression of becoming less exploratory and less provocative in his choices of words and phrases. Instead of providing a lead "into possible meanings and openings-out of the material in hand," the vocabulary now served "to crystallize governing impressions," the diction no longer attracted attention to itself, except as an effort at exact definition. The language, Berthoff continues, reflects a "controlling intelligence, of right judgment and completed understanding". The sense of free inquiry and exploration that infused his earlier writing and accounted for its "rare force and expansiveness," tended to give way to "static enumeration". By comparison to the verbal music and kinetic energy of Moby-Dick, Melville's subsequent writings seem "relatively muted, even withheld" in his later works.

Melville's paragraphing in his best work Berthoff considers to be the virtuous result of "compactness of form and free assembling of unanticipated further data", such as when the mysterious sperm whale is compared with Exodus's invisibility of God's face in the final paragraph of Chapter 86 ("The Tail"). Over time Melville's paragraphs became shorter as his sentences grew longer, until he arrived at the "one-sentence paragraphing characteristic of his later prose". Berthoff points to the opening chapter of The Confidence-Man for an example, as it counts fifteen paragraphs, seven of which consist of only one elaborate sentence, and four that have only two sentences. The use of a similar technique in Billy Budd contributes in large part, Berthoff says, to its "remarkable narrative economy".

Verily I say unto you, It shall be more tolerable for the land of Sodom and Gomorrah in the day of judgment, than for that city.

— Matthew 10:15

=== Style and literary allusion ===
In Nathalia Wright's view, Melville's sentences generally have a looseness of structure, easy to use for devices as catalogue and allusion, parallel and refrain, proverb and allegory. The length of his clauses may vary greatly, but the narrative style of writing in Pierre and The Confidence-Man is there to convey feeling, not thought. Unlike Henry James, who was an innovator of sentence ordering to render the subtlest nuances in thought, Melville made few such innovations. His domain is the mainstream of English prose, with its rhythm and simplicity influenced by the King James Bible. Another important characteristic of Melville's writing style is in its echoes and overtones. Melville's imitation of certain distinct styles is responsible for this. His three most important sources, in order, are the Bible, Shakespeare, and Milton. Direct quotation from any of the sources is slight; only one sixth of his Biblical allusions can be qualified as such because Melville adapts Biblical usage to his own narrated textual requirements.

The Biblical elements in Melville's style can be divided into three categories. In the first, allusion is more within the narrative rather than formal quotation. Several preferred Biblical allusions appear repeatedly throughout his body of work, taking on the nature of refrains. Examples are the injunctions to be 'as wise as serpents and as harmless as doves,' 'death on a pale horse,' 'the man of sorrows', the 'many mansions of heaven;' proverbs 'as the hairs on our heads are numbered,' 'pride goes before a fall,' 'the wages of sin is death;' adverbs and pronouns as 'verily, whoso, forasmuch as; phrases as come to pass, children's children, the fat of the land, vanity of vanities, outer darkness, the apple of his eye, Ancient of Days, the rose of Sharon.' Second, there are paraphrases of individual and combined verses. Redburn's "Thou shalt not lay stripes upon these Roman citizens" makes use of language of the Ten Commandments in Ex.20 and Pierre's inquiry of Lucy: "Loveth she me with the love past all understanding?" combines John 21:15–17, and Philippians 4:7. (Note: And the peace of God, which passeth all understanding, shall keep your hearts...) Third, certain Hebraisms are used, such as a succession of genitives ("all the waves of the billows of the seas of the boisterous mob"), the cognate accusative ("I dreamed a dream", "Liverpool was created with the Creation"), and the parallel ("Closer home does it go than a rammer; and fighting with steel is a play without ever an interlude"). This passage from Redburn shows how these ways of alluding interlock and result in a texture of Biblical language though there is very little direct quotation:

The other world beyond this, which was longed for by the devout before Columbus' time, was found in the New; and the deep-sea land, that first struck these soundings, brought up the soil of Earth's Paradise. Not a Paradise then, or now; but to be made so at God's good pleasure, (Note: Germanism, borrowed from the promise in Luke that the kingdom will be given to the chosen people.) and in the fulness and mellowness of time. (Note: Genitive of attribute) The seed is sown, and the harvest must come; and our children's children, (Note: Cognate construction and familiar Biblical idiom.) on the world's jubilee morning, shall all go with their sickles to the reaping. Then shall the curse of Babel be revoked, (Note: Inversion of order to resemble the speeches of the King of the account of the Last Judgment in Matthew 25:34: "Then shall the king say unto them on his right hand ...") a new Pentecost come, and the language they shall speak shall be the language of Britain. (Note: Paraphrase of familiar Biblical idiom and cognate construction) Frenchmen, and Danes, and Scots; and the dwellers on the shores of the Mediterranean, (Note: Allusion to Acts 2:9: "Parthians, and Medes, and Elamites, and the dwellers in Mesopotamia, and in ...") and in the regions round about; (Note: Use of compound prepositions) Italians, and Indians, and Moors; there shall appear unto them cloven tongues as of fire. (Note: Acts 2:3: "And there appeared unto them cloven tongues like as of fire, and it sat upon each of them".)

— The American melting pot described in Redburn's Biblical language, with Nathalia Wright's glosses.

In addition to this, Melville successfully imitates three Biblical strains: the apocalyptic, the prophetic and the sermonic narrative tone of writing. Melville sustains the apocalyptic tone of anxiety and foreboding for a whole chapter of Mardi. The prophetic strain is expressed by Melville in Moby-Dick, most notably in Father Mapple's sermon. The tradition of the Psalms is imitated at length by Melville in The Confidence-Man.

In 1849, Melville acquired an edition of Shakespeare's works printed in a font large enough for his tired eyes, which led to a deeper study of Shakespeare that greatly influenced the style of his next book, Moby-Dick (1851). The critic F. O. Matthiessen found that the language of Shakespeare far surpasses other influences upon the book, in that it inspired Melville to discover his own full strength. On almost every page, debts to Shakespeare can be discovered. The "mere sounds, full of Leviathanism, but signifying nothing" at the end of "Cetology" (Ch. 32) echo the famous phrase in Macbeth: "Told by an idiot, full of sound and fury/ Signifying nothing". Ahab's first extended speech to the crew, in the "Quarter-Deck" (Ch. 36) is practically blank verse and so is Ahab's soliloquy at the beginning of "Sunset" (Ch. 37): 'I leave a white and turbid wake;/ Pale waters, paler cheeks, where'er I sail./ The envious billows sidelong swell to whelm/ My track; let them; but first I pass.' Through Shakespeare, Melville infused Moby-Dick with a power of expression he had not previously expressed. Reading Shakespeare had been "a catalytic agent" for Melville, one that transformed his writing from merely reporting to "the expression of profound natural forces". The extent to which Melville assimilated Shakespeare is evident in the description of Ahab, Matthiessen continues, which ends in language that seems Shakespearean yet is no imitation: 'Oh, Ahab! what shall be grand in thee, it must needs be plucked from the skies and dived for in the deep, and featured in the unbodied air!' The imaginative richness of the final phrase seems particularly Shakespearean, "but its two key words appear only once each in the plays ... and to neither of these usages is Melville indebted for his fresh combination". Melville's diction depended upon no source, and his prose is not based on anybody else's verse but on an awareness of "speech rhythm".

Melville's mastering of Shakespeare, Matthiessen finds, supplied him with verbal resources that enabled him to create dramatic language through three essential techniques. First, the use of verbs of action creates a sense of movement and meaning. The effective tension caused by the contrast of "thou launchest navies of full-freighted worlds" and "there's that in here that still remains indifferent" in "The Candles" (Ch. 119) makes the last clause lead to a "compulsion to strike the breast," which suggests "how thoroughly the drama has come to inhere in the words;" Second, Melville took advantage of the Shakespearean energy of verbal compounds, as in "full-freighted". Third, Melville employed the device of making one part of speech act as another, for example, 'earthquake' as an adjective, or turning an adjective into a noun, as in "placeless".

Melville's style, in Nathalia Wright's analysis, seamlessly flows over into theme, because all these borrowings have an artistic purpose, which is to suggest an appearance "larger and more significant than life" for characters and themes that are in fact unremarkable. The allusions suggest that beyond the world of appearances another world exists, one that influences this world, and where ultimate truth can be found. Moreover, the ancient background thus suggested for Melville's narratives – ancient allusions being next in number to the Biblical ones – invests them with a sense of timelessness.

In addition to the classical references and stylistic elements, Melville openly referred to a multitude of contemporary scientific and maritime works. He read and referenced works by whalers, sailors, and naturalists in his novel Moby-Dick. A large number of volumes he actually owned and annotated have been scanned and made available for online viewing, complete with his notes in the margins.

== Critical reception ==
Melville's financial success as a writer during his lifetime was not great, relative to his posthumous success; over his entire lifetime Melville's writings earned him just over $10,000 (equivalent to $302,344 in 2025). Melville's travelogues based on voyages to the South Seas and stories based on his time in the merchant marine and navy led to some initial success, but his popularity declined dramatically afterwards. By 1876, all of his books were out of print. He was viewed as a minor figure in American literature in the later years of his life and during the years immediately after his death.

=== Poetry ===
Melville did not publish poetry until his late forties, with Battle-Pieces (1866), and did not receive recognition as a poet until well into the 20th century. But he wrote predominantly poetry for about 25 years, twice as long as his prose career. The three novels of the 1850s that Melville worked on most seriously to present his philosophical explorations, Moby-Dick, Pierre, and The Confidence Man, seem to make the step to philosophical poetry a natural one rather than simply a consequence of commercial failure. Since he turned to poetry as a meditative practice, his poetic style, even more than most Victorian poets, was not marked by linguistic play or melodic considerations.

Early critics were not sympathetic. Henry Chapin, in his introduction to John Marr and Other Poems (1922), one of the earlier selections of Melville's poetry, said Melville's verse is "of an amateurish and uneven quality" but in it "that loveable freshness of personality, which his philosophical dejection never quenched, is everywhere in evidence," in "the voice of a true poet". The poet and novelist Robert Penn Warren became a champion of Melville as a great American poet and issued a selection of Melville's poetry in 1971 prefaced by an admiring critical essay. In the 1990s critic Lawrence Buell argued that Melville "is justly said to be nineteenth-century America's leading poet after Whitman and Dickinson" and Helen Vendler remarked of Clarel: "What it cost Melville to write this poem makes us pause, reading it. Alone, it is enough to win him, as a poet, what he called 'the belated funeral flower of fame'." Some critics now place him as the first modernist poet in the United States while others assert that his work more strongly suggests what today would be a postmodern view.

=== Melville revival and Melville studies ===
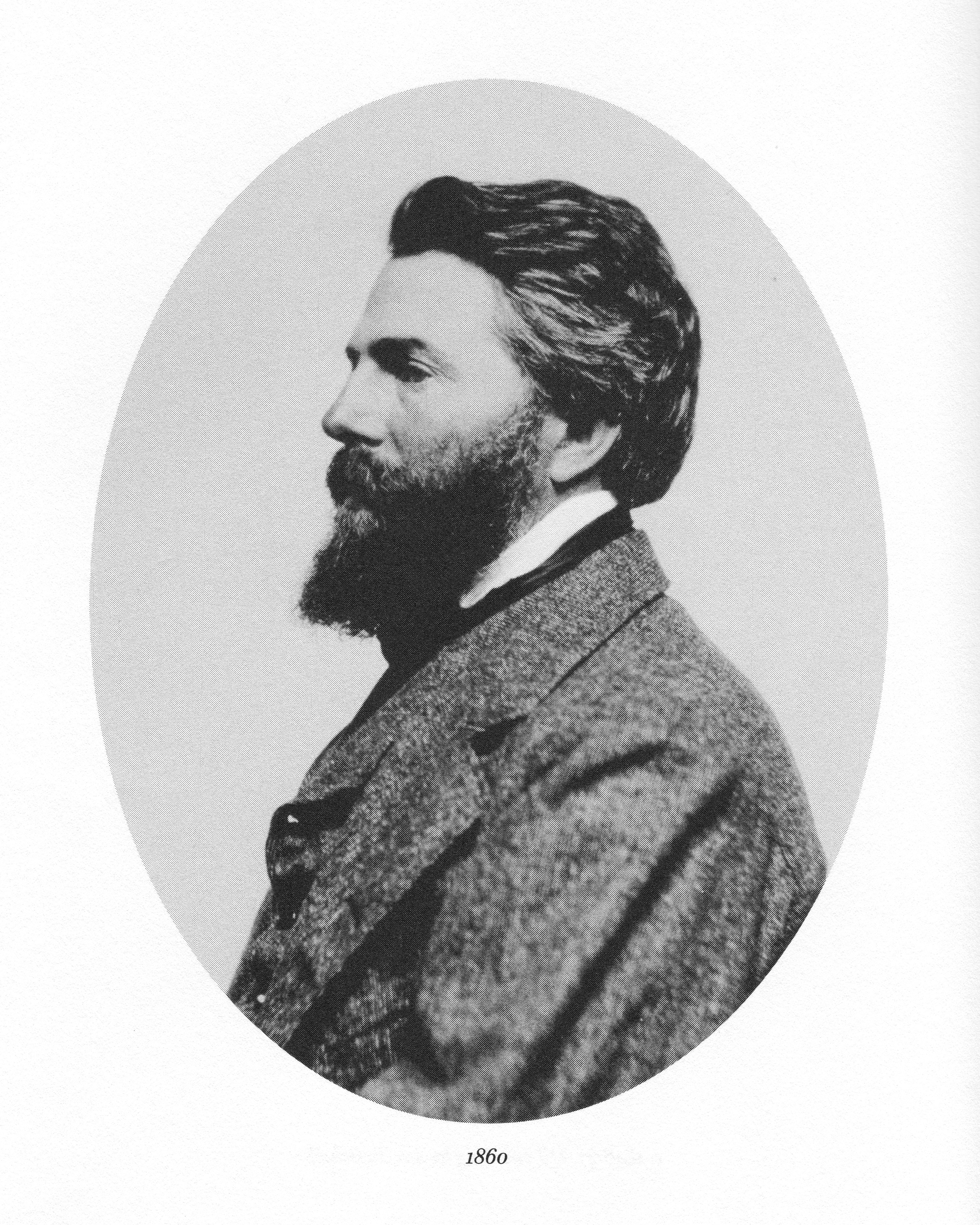
Melville in 1860

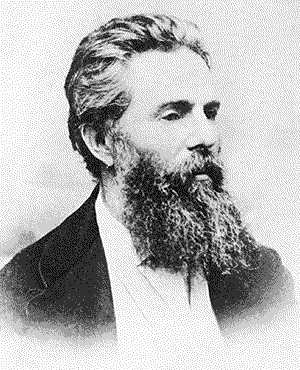
Melville in 1868

The 1919 centennial of Melville's birth coincided with a renewed interest in his writings known as the "Melville revival", during which his work experienced a significant critical reassessment. The renewed appreciation began in 1917 with Carl Van Doren's article on Melville in a standard history of American literature. Van Doren also encouraged Raymond Weaver, who wrote the author's first full-length biography, Herman Melville: Mariner and Mystic (1921). Discovering the unfinished manuscript of Billy Budd, among papers shown to him by Melville's granddaughter, Weaver edited it and published it in a new collected edition of Melville's works. Other works that helped fan the flames for Melville were Carl Van Doren's The American Novel (1921), D. H. Lawrence's Studies in Classic American Literature (1923), Carl Van Vechten's essay in The Double Dealer (1922), and Lewis Mumford's biography Herman Melville (1929).

Starting in the mid-1930s, the Yale University scholar Stanley Thomas Williams supervised more than a dozen dissertations on Melville that were eventually published as books. Where the first wave of Melville scholars focused on psychology, Williams' students were prominent in establishing Melville Studies as an academic field concerned with texts and manuscripts, tracing Melville's influences and borrowings (even plagiarism), and exploring archives and local publications. To provide historical evidence, the independent scholar Jay Leyda searched libraries, family papers, local archives and newspapers across New England and New York to document Melville's life day by day for his two-volume The Melville Log (1951). Sparked by Leyda and post-war scholars, the second phase of the Melville Revival emphasized research into the biography of Melville rather than accepting Melville's early books as reliable accounts.

In 1945, The Melville Society was founded, a non-profit organization dedicated to the study of Melville's life and works. Between 1969 and 2003, the society published 125 issues of Melville Society Extracts, which are now freely available on the society's website. Since 1999 it has published Leviathan: A Journal of Melville Studies, currently three issues a year, published by Johns Hopkins University Press.

The postwar scholars tended to think that Weaver, Harvard psychologist Henry Murray, and Mumford favored Freudian interpretations that read Melville's fiction as autobiography, exaggerated his suffering in the family, and inferred a homosexual attachment to Hawthorne. They saw a different arc to Melville's writing career. The first biographers saw a tragic withdrawal after the cold critical reception of his prose works and largely dismissed his poetry. A new view emerged of Melville's turn to poetry as a conscious choice that placed him among the most important American poets. Other post-war studies, however, continued the broad imaginative and interpretive style; Charles Olson's Call Me Ishmael (1947) presented Ahab as a Shakespearean tragic hero, and Newton Arvin's critical biography, Herman Melville (1950), won the National Book Award for non-fiction in 1951.

In the 1960s, Harrison Hayford organized an alliance between Northwestern University Press and the Newberry Library, with backing from the Modern Language Association and funding from the National Endowment for the Humanities, to edit and publish reliable critical texts of Melville's complete works, including unpublished poems, journals, and correspondence. The first volume of the Northwestern-Newberry Edition of The Writings of Herman Melville was published in 1968 and the last in the fall of 2017. The aim of the editors was to present a text "as close as possible to the author's intention as surviving evidence permits". The volumes have extensive appendices, including textual variants from each of the editions published in Melville's lifetime, an historical note on the publishing history and critical reception, and related documents. Because the texts were prepared with financial support from the United States Department of Education, no royalties are charged, and they have been widely reprinted. Hershel Parker published his two-volume Herman Melville: A Biography, in 1996 and 2002, based on extensive original research and his involvement as editor of the Northwestern-Newberry Melville edition.

Today Melville's works feature in programs such as the collaboration between Williams College and the Mystic Seaport maritime museum, which together have created an interdisciplinary ocean and coastal studies program. Williams-Mystic integrates marine science, maritime history, environmental policy, and literature of the sea. Melville scholars Mary Bercaw Edwards and Richard J. King feature among the program's professors.

=== Gender studies ===
Melville only gradually attracted the pioneering scholars of women's studies, gender, and sexuality in the 1970s and 1980s. Though some held that he hardly portrayed women at all, others saw the few women in his works as traditional figures representing, or even attacking, nineteenth-century gentility, sentimentality, and conventional morality. Melville's preference for sea-going tales that involved almost only males has been of interest to scholars in men's studies and especially gay and queer studies. Melville was remarkably open in his exploration of sexuality of all sorts. Alvin Sandberg said that the short story "The Paradise of Bachelors and the Tartarus of Maids" offers "an exploration of impotency, a portrayal of a man retreating to an all-male childhood to avoid confrontation with sexual manhood," from which the narrator engages in "congenial" digressions in heterogeneity. In line with this view, Warren Rosenberg argues the homosocial "Paradise of Bachelors" is "blind to what is real and painful in the world, and thus are [sic] superficial and sterile".

David Harley Serlin observes in the second half of Melville's diptych, "The Tartarus of Maids", the narrator gives voice to the oppressed women he observes:

As other scholars have noted, the "slave" image here has two clear connotations. One describes the exploitation of the women's physical labor, and the other describes the exploitation of the women's reproductive organs. Of course, as models of women's oppression, the two are clearly intertwined.

— Serlin (1995)

In the end Serlin says that the narrator is never fully able to come to terms with the contrasting masculine and feminine modalities.

Issues of sexuality have been observed in other works as well. Rosenberg notes Taji, in Mardi, and the protagonist in Pierre "think they are saving young 'maidens in distress' (Yillah and Isabel) out of the purest of reasons but both are also conscious of a lurking sexual motive". When Taji kills the old priest holding Yillah captive, he says,

[R]emorse smote me hard; and like lightning I asked myself whether the death deed I had done was sprung of virtuous motive, the rescuing of a captive from thrall, or whether beneath the pretense I had engaged in this fatal affray for some other selfish purpose, the companionship of a beautiful maid.

In Pierre, the motive of the protagonist's sacrifice for Isabel is admitted: "womanly beauty and not womanly ugliness invited him to champion the right". Rosenberg argues,

This awareness of a double motive haunts both books and ultimately destroys their protagonists who would not fully acknowledge the dark underside of their idealism. The epistemological quest and the transcendental quest for love and belief are consequently sullied by the erotic.

Rosenberg says that Melville fully explores the theme of sexuality in his major epic poem, Clarel. When the narrator is separated from Ruth, with whom he has fallen in love, he is free to explore other sexual (and religious) possibilities before deciding at the end of the poem to participate in the ritualistic order represented by marriage. In the course of the poem, "he considers every form of sexual orientation – celibacy, homosexuality, hedonism, and heterosexuality – raising the same kinds of questions as when he considers Islam or Democracy".

Some passages and sections of Melville's works demonstrate his willingness to address all forms of sexuality, including the homoerotic, in his works. Commonly noted examples from Moby-Dick are the "marriage bed" episode involving Ishmael and Queequeg, who sleep with their arms wrapped around each other (Chapter 4, "The Counterpane" and Chapter 10, "A Bosom Friend"); and the "Squeeze of the Hand" (Chapter 94) describing the camaraderie of sailors' extracting spermaceti from a dead whale. Clarel recognizes the homoerotic potential of its eponymous protagonist, including, in a fairly explicit passage, an erection provoked by the figure of a male interlocutor, Lyonesse. In addition, Rosenberg notes that Billy Budd's physical attractiveness is described in quasi-feminine terms: "As the Handsome Sailor, Billy Budd's position aboard the seventy-four was something analogous to that of a rustic beauty transplanted from the provinces and brought into competition with the highborn dames of the court".

=== Law and literature ===
Melville has been cited in the field of law and literature. The chapter "Fast-Fish and Loose-Fish" in Moby-Dick, for instance, challenges concepts of property rights. In Billy Budd, a handsome and popular young sailor strikes and inadvertently kills the ship's master-at-arms. The ship's captain immediately convenes a court-martial at which he urges the court to convict and sentence Billy to death. Critics debate Melville's intention. Some see the contradiction between unbending legalism and malleable moral principles. Other critics have argued that the captain manipulated and misrepresented the applicable laws.

== Themes ==
Melville's work often touched on themes of communicative expression and the pursuit of the absolute among illusions. As early as 1839, in the juvenile sketch "Fragments from a Writing Desk", Melville explores a problem that would reappear in the short stories "Bartleby" (1853) and "Benito Cereno" (1855): the impossibility to find common ground for mutual communication. The sketch centers on the protagonist and a mute lady, leading scholar Sealts to observe: "Melville's deep concern with expression and communication evidently began early in his career".

According to scholar Nathalia Wright, Melville's characters are all preoccupied by the same intense, superhuman and eternal quest for "the absolute amidst its relative manifestations," an enterprise central to the Melville canon: "All Melville's plots describe this pursuit, and all his themes represent the delicate and shifting relationship between its truth and its illusion". It is not clear, however, what the moral and metaphysical implications of this quest are, because Melville did not distinguish between these two aspects. Throughout his life Melville struggled with and gave shape to the same set of epistemological doubts and the metaphysical issues these doubts engendered. An obsession for the limits of knowledge led to the question of God's existence and nature, the indifference of the universe, and the problem of evil.

== Legacy and honors ==
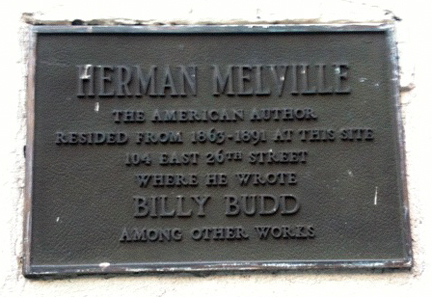
Plaque commemorating Melville at 104 East 26th Street in Manhattan, where he lived from 1863 to 1891

In 1854, three years following publication of Moby-Dick, Melville, New York, on Long Island, was named in Melville's honor.

In 1982, the Library of America (LOA) began publishing works in honor of Melville's central place in American culture; the first volume contained Typee, Omoo, and Mardi. Subsequent volumes included Melville's Redburn, White-Jacket, and Moby-Dick, published in 1983, and Pierre, Israel Potter, The Confidence-Man, Tales, and Billy Budd, published in 1985. LOA did not publish his complete poetry until 2019.

On August 1, 1984, as part of the Literary Arts Series of stamps, the U.S. Postal Service issued a 20-cent commemorative stamp to honor Melville. The setting for the first day of issue was the Whaling Museum in New Bedford, Massachusetts.

In 1985, the New York City Herman Melville Society gathered at 104 East 26th Street to dedicate the intersection of Park Avenue South and 26th Street as Herman Melville Square, where Melville lived from 1863 to 1891 and where he authored Billy Budd and other works. Melville's house in Lansingburgh, New York, houses the Lansingburgh Historical Society.

In 2010, a species of extinct sperm whale, Livyatan melvillei, was named in honor of Melville. The paleontologists who discovered the fossil were fans of Moby-Dick, and dedicated their discovery to the author.

Melville himself did not live to see the ultimate success of his masterpiece. At the time of his death in 1891, the slow burn of interest in Moby-Dick had not yet caught fire. Melville died not knowing that his novel would become a lasting cultural phenomenon, and that the term "white whale" would still be understood, two centuries hence, even by people who had never read his work.

== Selected bibliography ==
- Typee: A Peep at Polynesian Life (1846)
- Omoo: A Narrative of Adventures in the South Seas (1847)
- Mardi: and a Voyage Thither (1849)
- Redburn: His First Voyage (1849)
- White-Jacket; or, The World in a Man-of-War (1850)
- Moby-Dick; or, The Whale (1851)
- Pierre; or, The Ambiguities (1852)
- Isle of the Cross (1853; unpublished, and now lost)
- "Bartleby, the Scrivener" (1853) (short story)
- "The Encantadas, or Enchanted Isles" (1854) (novella)
- "Benito Cereno" (1855) (novella)
- Israel Potter: His Fifty Years of Exile (1855)
- The Confidence-Man: His Masquerade (1857)
- Battle-Pieces and Aspects of the War (1866) (poetry collection)
- Clarel: A Poem and Pilgrimage in the Holy Land (1876) (epic poem)
- John Marr and Other Sailors (1888) (poetry collection)
- Timoleon (1891) (poetry collection)
- Billy Budd, Sailor (An Inside Narrative) (1891 unfinished, published posthumously in 1924; authoritative edition in 1962)

== General and cited sources ==
- Arvin, Newton (1950). Herman Melville. New York: William Sloane Associates. LCCN 50-7584. May be borrowed at Internet Archive here
- Bercaw, Mary (1987). Melville's Sources. Evanston, Illinois: Northwestern University Press. ISBN 0-8101-0734-1. OCLC 932571921.
- Bercaw Edwards, Mary (2009). "Questioning Typee". Leviathan. 11 (2): 24–42. doi:10.1111/j.1750-1849.2009.01340.x. ISSN 1525-6995.
- Berthoff, Warner (1972) [1962]. The Example of Melville. New York: W. W. Norton & Company. ISBN 9780393005950. OCLC 610731769.
- Bezanson, Walter (1986). "Moby-Dick: Document, Drama, Dream". In Bryant, John (ed.). A Companion to Melville Studies. Westport, Connecticut: Greenwood Press. ISBN 978-0-313-23874-1. OCLC 473782787.
- Bowen, Merlin (1960). The Long Encounter: Self and Experience in the Writings of Herman Melville. Phoenix books. Chicago: University of Chicago Press.
- Branch, Watson, ed. (1974). Melville: The Critical Heritage. London and Boston: Routledge and Kegan Paul. ISBN 9780710077745. OCLC 755172141.
- Buell, Lawrence (1998). "Melville The Poet". In Levine, Robert (ed.). The Cambridge Companion to Melville. Cambridge University Press. Archived from the original on May 12, 2016.
- Chapin, Henry (1922). Introduction. John Marr & Other Poems. By Melville, Herman. Princeton, NJ: Princeton University Press.
- Delbanco, Andrew (2005). Melville, His World and Work. New York: Knopf. ISBN 978-0-375-40314-9. OCLC 845847813.
- Fang, Janet (June 30, 2010). "Call me Leviathan melvillei". Nature. doi:10.1038/news.2010.322. Archived from the original on July 3, 2010.
- Fritz, Meaghan (November 22, 2017). "'The Coiled Fish of the Sea': A Brief History of the Northwestern-Newberry Edition of the Writings of Herman Melville". Incidental Noyes. Northwestern University Press. Archived from the original on March 31, 2019.
- Ghosh, Pallah (June 30, 2010). "'Sea monster' whale fossil unearthed". BBC News. BBC.
- Hardwick, Elizabeth (2000). Herman Melville. Penguin. p. 65.
- Horth, Lynn, ed. (1993). Correspondence. The Writings of Herman Melville. Vol. Fourteen. Evanston and Chicago: Northwestern University Press and The Newberry Library. ISBN 0-8101-0995-6.
- Hutchins, Zach (2014). "Herman Melville's Fejee Mermaid, or a Confidence Man at the Lycuem". ESQ. 60 (1): 75–109. doi:10.1353/esq.2014.0004. S2CID 162189302.
- Jordan, Tina (April 1, 2019). "'Abnormal, as Most Geniuses Are': Celebrating 200 Years of Herman Melville". The New York Times. Archived from the original on January 2, 2022.
- Kennedy, Frederick James (March 1977). "Herman Melville's Lecture in Montreal". The New England Quarterly. 50 (1): 125–137. doi:10.2307/364707. JSTOR 364707.
- Kennedy, Joyce Deveau; Kennedy, Frederick James (February 1978a). "Elizabeth and Herman" (PDF). Melville Society Extracts (33): 4–12.
- Kennedy, Joyce Deveau; Kennedy, Frederick James (May 1978b). "Elizabeth and Herman (Part II)" (PDF). Melville Society Extracts (34): 3–8.
- Levine, Robert (2014). "Chronology of Melville's Life". In Levine, Robert (ed.). The New Cambridge Companion to Herman Melville. New York: Cambridge University Press. ISBN 978-1107470422.
- Levine, Robert S. and Samuel Otter, eds. (2008). Frederick Douglass & Herman Melville: Essays in Relation. Chapel Hill: University of North Carolina Press.
- Leyda, Jay (1969) [1951]. The Melville Log; a Documentary Life of Herman Melville, 1819–1891. New York: Gordian Press.
- Marovitz, Sanford (2007). "The Melville Revival". In Kelley, Wyn (ed.). A Companion to Herman Melville. Blackwell. pp. 515–531. ISBN 9780470996782. OCLC 699013659.
- Matthiessen, F. O. (1966) [1941]. American Renaissance: Art and Expression in the Age of Emerson and Whitman (Tenth Printing ed.). New York, London and Toronto: Oxford University Press.
- Melville, Herman (1973). Hillway, Tyrus (ed.). Mardi. New Haven: College and University Press. ISBN 9780805772562.
- Melville, Herman (1957). Pierre. New York: Grove Press. OCLC 1019941646.
- "Leviathan: A Journal of Melville Studies". melvillesociety.org. The Melville Society. Archived from the original on November 2, 2016.
- Milder, Robert (1988). "Herman Melville". Columbia Literary History of the United States. Emory Elliott (General Editor). New York: Columbia University Press. ISBN 0-231-05812-8.
- Olsen-Smith, Steven (2015). ""Introduction" and "Chronology"". In Olsen-Smith, Steven (ed.). Melville in His Own Time: A Biographical Chronicle of His Life, Drawn from Recollection, Interviews, and Memoirs by Family, Friends, and Associates. Iowa City: University of Iowa Press. ISBN 978-1-60938-333-6.
- Mitgang, Herbert (May 12, 1985). "Voyaging Far and Wide in Search of Melville". The New York Times. Archived from the original on May 25, 2012.
- "National Book Awards 1951". National Book Foundation. Archived from the original on October 28, 2018.
- Page, William (1986). "The place of law and literature". Vanderbilt Law Review. 39 (2): 391–418.
- Parker, Hershel (1988). "Historical Note". In Hayford, Harrison; Parker, Hershel; Tanselle, G. Thomas (eds.). Moby-Dick, or, the Whale. The writings of Herman Melville. Vol. 6. Evanston; Chicago: Northwestern University Press; Newberry Library. ISBN 0810103249.
- Parker, Hershel (Winter 1990). "Billy Budd, Foretopman and the Dynamics of Canonization". College Literature. 1. 17 (1): 21–32. JSTOR 25111840.
- Parker, Hershel (1996). Herman Melville: A Biography. Volume I, 1819–1851. Baltimore: Johns Hopkins University Press. ISBN 978-0-8018-5428-6.
- Parker, Hershel (2002). Herman Melville: A Biography. Volume II, 1851–1891. Baltimore: The Johns Hopkins University Press. ISBN 978-0-8018-8186-2.
- Person, Leland S. (2006). "Gender and sexuality". In Kelley, Wyn (ed.). A Companion to Herman Melville. John Wiley & Sons. ISBN 9781405171946.
- Piety, Tamara R. "Something Fishy: Or Why I Make My Students Read Fast-Fish And Loose-Fish" (PDF). Vermont Law Review. 29 (33): 33, 37, 39.
- Robertson-Lorant, Laurie (1996). Melville: A Biography. New York: Clarkson Potter/Publishers. ISBN 978-0-517-59314-1.
- Rosenberg, Warren (1984). "'Deeper than Sappho': Melville, poetry, and the Erotic". Modern Language Studies. 14 (1): 70–78. doi:10.2307/3194508. JSTOR 3194508.
- Sandberg, Alvin (1968). "Erotic Patterns in 'The Paradise of Bachelors and the Tartarus of Maids'". Literature and Psychology. 18 (1): 2–8.
- Scharnhorst, Gary (Spring 1983). "Biographical Blindspots: The Case of the Cousins Alger". Biography. 6 (2): 136–147. doi:10.1353/bio.2010.0651. JSTOR 23538983. S2CID 161222133.
- Scott Standard Postage Catalog. Vol. 1. Sidney, Ohio: Scott Publishing Company. 2000. Scott #2094.
- Sealts, Merton M. Jr. (1987). "Historical Note". The Piazza Tales and Other Prose Pieces 1839–1860. By Melville, Herman. Hayford, Harrison; MacDougall, Alma A.; Tanselle, G. Thomas; et al. (eds.). Evanston and Chicago: Northwestern University Press and The Newberry Library. ISBN 0810105500.
- Sealts, Merton M. Jr. (1988). Melville's Reading (Revised and Enlarged ed.). University of South Carolina Press. ISBN 0872495159.
- Serlin, David Harley (1995). "The Dialogue of Gender in Melville's The Paradise of Bachelors and the Tartarus of Maids". Modern Language Studies. 25 (2): 80–87. doi:10.2307/3195291. JSTOR 3195291.
- Shneidman, E. S. (1976). "Some psychological reflections on the death of Malcolm Melville". Suicide Life Threat Behav. 6 (4): 231–242. doi:10.1111/j.1943-278X.1976.tb00881.x. PMID 799381. S2CID 33066107.
- Spanos, William V. (2009). Herman Melville and the American Calling: The Fiction After Moby-Dick, 1851–1857. SUNY Press. ISBN 978-0-7914-7563-8.
- Spark, Clare L. (2006). Hunting Captain Ahab: Psychological Warfare and the Melville Revival. Kent, Ohio: Kent State Univ. Press. ISBN 978-0873388887.
- Sullivan, Wilson (1972). New England Men of Letters. New York: Atheneum. ISBN 0-02-788680-8.
- Tick, Edward (August 17, 1986). "Melville Ashore". The New York Times. Archived from the original on October 5, 2019.
- Titus, David K. (May 1980). "Herman Melville at the Albany Academy". Melville Society Extracts (42): 1, 4–10. Archived from the original on March 3, 2016.
- Vendler, Helen (1995). Selected Poems of Herman Melville. San Francisco: Arion Press.
- Wallace, Robert K. (1992). Melville & Turner: Spheres of Love and Fright. The University of Georgia Press. ISBN 0-8203-1366-1. "Wallace explores the stylistic and aesthetic affinities of English landscape painter J. M. W. Turner (1775–1851) and American novelist Herman Melville, establishing Turner as a decisive influence on the creation of Melville's Moby-Dick". (Quotation from dust jacket)
- Wallace, Robert K. (2005). Douglass & Melville: Anchored Together In Neighborly Style. New Bedford, Massachusetts: Spinner Publications, Inc. ISBN 978-0932027917.
- Weisberg, Richard (1984). The Failure of the Word: The Lawyer as Protagonist in Modern Fiction. New Haven, Connecticut: Yale University Press. ISBN 9780300045925. OCLC 1032720496. "Part 4. The Creative Use of Statutes for Subjective Ends: The Case of Billy Budd, Sailor".
- Wilson, Scott (2016). Resting Places: The Burial Sites of More Than 14,000 Famous Persons (3rd (Kindle) ed.). McFarland & Company. OCLC 957437234.
- Wright, Nathalia (May 1940). "Biblical Allusion in Melville's Prose". American Literature. 12 (2): 185–199. doi:10.2307/2920476. JSTOR 2920476.
- Wright, Nathalia (1949). Melville's Use of the Bible. Durham, North Carolina: Duke University Press.
- Wright, Nathalia (September 1987). "Melville and STW at Yale: Studies under Stanley T. Williams". Melville Society Extracts (70): 1–4. Archived from the original on October 24, 2014.
