= Mardi =

1849 book by Herman Melville

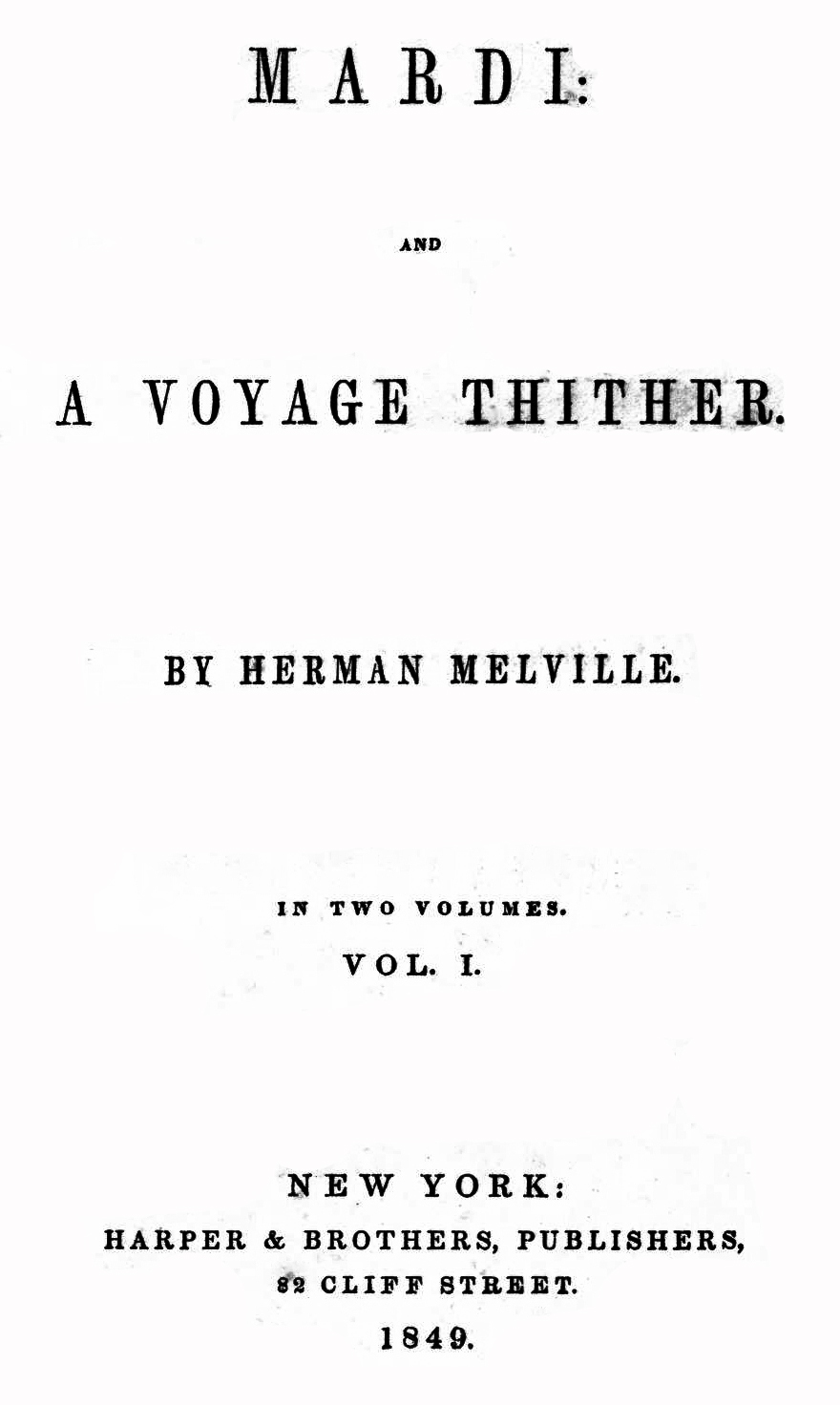
- First edition title page
- Author: Herman Melville
- Language: English
- Genre: Romance literature
- Published: 1849 (New York: Harper & Brothers); 1849 (London: Richard Bentley)
- Publication place: United States, England
- Media type: Print
- Preceded by: Omoo
- Followed by: Redburn

Mardi: and a Voyage Thither is the third book by American writer Herman Melville, first published in London in 1849. Beginning as a travelogue in the vein of the author's two previous efforts, the adventure story gives way to a romance story, which in its turn gives way to a philosophical quest.

== Overview ==
Mardi is Melville's first purely fictional work, which the Preface calls a "romance." Although Melville and his publishers presented his first two books, Typee and Omoo, as factual, the Preface to Mardi says that since these two "in many quarters, were received with incredulity, the thought occurred to me, of indeed writing a romance of Polynesian adventure." Melville went on somewhat ironically, that this was "to see whether, the fiction, might not, possibly be received as a verity."

Much as did Typee and Omoo, Mardi recounts the travels of an American sailor who abandons a whaling vessel to explore the island of Mardi, in the South Pacific. Unlike the first two books, however, Mardi is highly philosophical and said to be the first work to show Melville's true potential. Although not as cohesive or lengthy as Moby-Dick, it is much longer than Typee and Omoo and has much more in common stylistically and thematically with Moby-Dick and later works of his maturity.

The tale begins as a fairly simple escape and survival narrative, then the narrator lands in Mardi and falls in love with a mysterious woman he has questionably rescued from a difficult situation. After the woman disappears, the story presumably becomes a quest for her among the innumerable isles of the newly "discovered" archipelago of Mardi, isles with many different symbolic and allegorical meanings. As the main characters continue their search for the woman, the novel switches to more than travelogue-style reporting of the sights, sounds, tastes, and smells to be experienced in Mardi. The social conventions, political structures, religious practices, odd histories, and other aspects of each isle and its inhabitants spark philosophical discourses between four main characters, with two previously main characters no longer in the story and the narrator recedes so far into the background that he does not even participate in the philosophical discussions. The quest for the woman continues but is barely mentioned, serving at least to get the main characters traveling through Mardi faster.

== Style ==
=== Influence of Rabelais and Swift ===
The voyage from island to island echoes Rabelais's Gargantua and Pantagruel, especially the last two books. According to scholar Newton Arvin:

The praise of eating and drinking is highly Rabelaisian in intention, and so in general is all the satire on bigotry, dogmatism, and pedantry. Taji and his friends wandering about on the island of Maramma, which stands for ecclesiastical tyranny and dogmatism, are bound to recall Pantagruel and his companions wandering among the superstitious inhabitants of Papimany; and the pedantic, pseudo-philosophy of Melville's Doxodox is surely, for a reader of Rabelais, an echo of the style of Master Janotus de Bragmardo holding forth polysyllabically to Gargantua in Book I.

Arvin also recognizes the influence of Gulliver's Travels by Jonathan Swift:

... there is something very Swiftian in Melville's Hooloomooloo, the Isle of Cripples, the inhabitants of which are all twisted and deformed, and whose shapeless king is horrified at the straight, strong figures of his visitors from over sea.

== Structure ==
The emotional center of the book, Arvin writes, is the relation between Taji and Yillah, the "I" and the mysterious blonde who disappears as suddenly as she appeared. Taji begins a quest for her throughout the islands without finding her. Though Arvin finds the allegory of Yillah "too tenuous and too pretty to be anything but an artistic miscarriage" in the poetic sense, he also finds it "extremely revealing" in connection with the whole Melville canon. Yillah, associated with the lily in the language of flowers, is "an embodiment of the pure, innocent, essentially sexless happiness", and Hautia, "symbolized by the dahlia", embodies "the sensual, the carnal, the engrossingly sexual". The middle portion of the book is taken up by "a series of forays in social and political satire, and by quasi-metaphysical speculations" that are, if at all, at best "only loosely and uncertainly related to the quest for Yillah". The only way to perceive any fabric holding the book together, Arvin feels, is by recognizing "a certain congruity among the various more or less frustrated quests it dramatizes--the quest for an emotional security once possessed, the quest for a just and happy sociality once too easily assumed possible, and the quest for an absolute and transcendent Truth once imagined to exist and still longed for."

== Themes ==
For Arvin, in Mardi Melville rejects not "the profounder moralities of democracy" so much as "a cluster of delusions and inessentials" that Americans have come to regard as somehow connected to the idea of democracy. Arvin recognizes three delusions to the cluster:

- "that political and social freedom is an ultimate good, however empty of content;
- that equality should be a literal fact as well as a spiritual ideal;
- that physical and moral evil are rapidly receding before the footsteps of Progress."

The philosophical plot, Arvin believes, is furnished by the interaction between the intense longing for certainty, and the suspicion that on the great fundamental questions, "final, last thoughts you mortals have none; nor can have." And even while one of the characters says, "Faith is to the thoughtless, doubts to the thinker", Arvin feels that Melville struggles to avoid a brutality of what Melville himself calls "indiscriminate skepticism", and he got closest to expressing "his basic thought" in Babbalanja's speech in the dark: "Be it enough for us to know that Oro"—God--"indubitably is. My lord! my lord! sick with the spectacle of the madness of men, and broken with spontaneous doubts, I sometimes see but two things in all Mardi to believe:--that I myself exist, and that I can most happily, or least miserably exist, by the practice of righteousness."

== Reception ==
=== Contemporary reviews ===
Mardi was a critical failure. One reviewer said the book contained "ideas in so thick a haze that we are unable to perceive distinctly which is which". Nevertheless, Nathaniel Parker Willis found the work "exquisite".

Nathaniel Hawthorne found Mardi a rich book "with depths here and there that compel a man to swim for his life ... so good that one scarcely pardons the writer for not having brooded long over it, so as to make it a great deal better."

The widespread disappointment of the critics hurt Melville yet he chose to view the book's reception philosophically, as the requisite growing pains of any author with high literary ambitions. "These attacks are matters of course, and are essential to the building up of any permanent reputation—if such would ever prove to be mine ... But Time, which is the solver of all riddles, will solve Mardi."

=== Later critical history ===
In the description of Arvin:

[T]he thoughts and feelings he was attempting to express in Mardi were too disparate among themselves and often too incongruous with his South Sea imagery to be capable of fusion into a satisfying artistic whole. In the rush and press of creative excitement that swept upon him in these months, Melville was trying to compose three or four books simultaneously: he failed, in the strict sense, to compose even one. Mardi has several centers, and the result is not a balanced design. There is an emotional center, an intellectual center, a social and political center, and though they are by no means utterly unrelated to each other, they do not occupy the same point in space.

== Sources ==
Giordano Lahaderne has proposed that Mardi may have been influenced by the Book of Mormon (1830). The opening sequence of each is an "Old Testament in reverse" and Mardi's second volume includes a discourse on "an illustrious prophet, and teacher divine" named Alma, a name shared by Alma, one of the major prophets and missionaries within the Book of Mormon.

== Editions ==
- Herman Melville, Mardi and a Voyage Thither (New York: Harper & Brothers, 1849). Online at Early American Fiction.
- Melville Herman, edited by Hershel Parker, G. Thomas Tanselle, with an Historical Note by Elizabeth Foster, The Writings of Herman Melville: The Northwestern-Newberry Edition, Vol. 3: Mardi: And a Voyage Thither (Evanston: Northwestern University Press, 1970)
- Herman Melville, edited by G. Thomas Tanselle, Typee: A Peep at Polynesian Life ; Omoo : A Narrative of Adventures in the South Seas ; Mardi : And a Voyage Thither (New York: Literary Classics of the United States; The Library of America, 1982)
