= Slab hut =

Kind of dwelling or shed made from slabs of split or sawn timber

Slab Hut
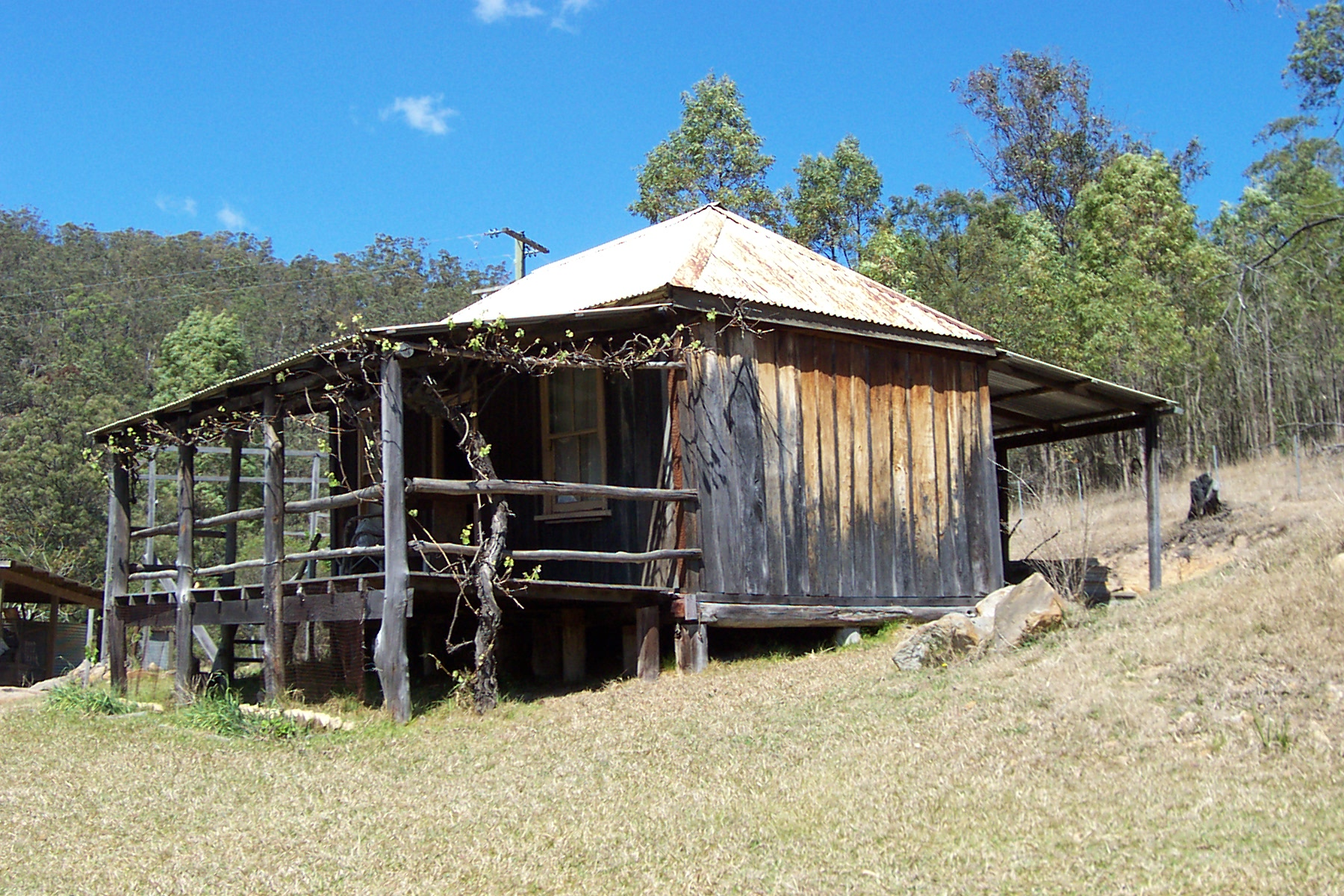
- Original Slab Hut, Wollombi NSW
- Places: Australia and New Zealand
- Period: c. 1790–1920
- Materials: Timber, bark, mud, clay, stone, Galvanized iron.
- Uses: dwellings, shops, farm outbuildings.

A slab hut is a kind of dwelling or shed made from slabs of split or sawn timber. It was a common form of construction used by settlers in Australia and New Zealand during their nations' colonial periods.

== Huts, humpies and hovels ==
=== The Australian settler ===
From the very beginning of European settlement in Australia, improvised methods of building construction were in use. The First Fleet, arriving in 1788, brought with it few carpenters and a meagre supply of poor-quality tools. Nails and other ironmongery were scarce. The colonists were forced to build shelters using whatever skills they possessed, from whatever natural materials they could find. They tried the traditional British wattle and daub (or 'dab') method: posts were set in the ground; thin branches were woven and set between these posts, and clay or mud was plastered over the weave to make a solid wall. Wattle and daub walls were easily destroyed by the drenching rains of Australia's severe summer storms, and for a time, walls of timber slabs took their place. These were soon replaced by brick structures; the Sydney Cove landscape was almost denuded of useful timber. (Note: See for example Thomas Watling A Direct North View of Sydney Cove, 1794 The trees are being rapidly cleared and burned.)

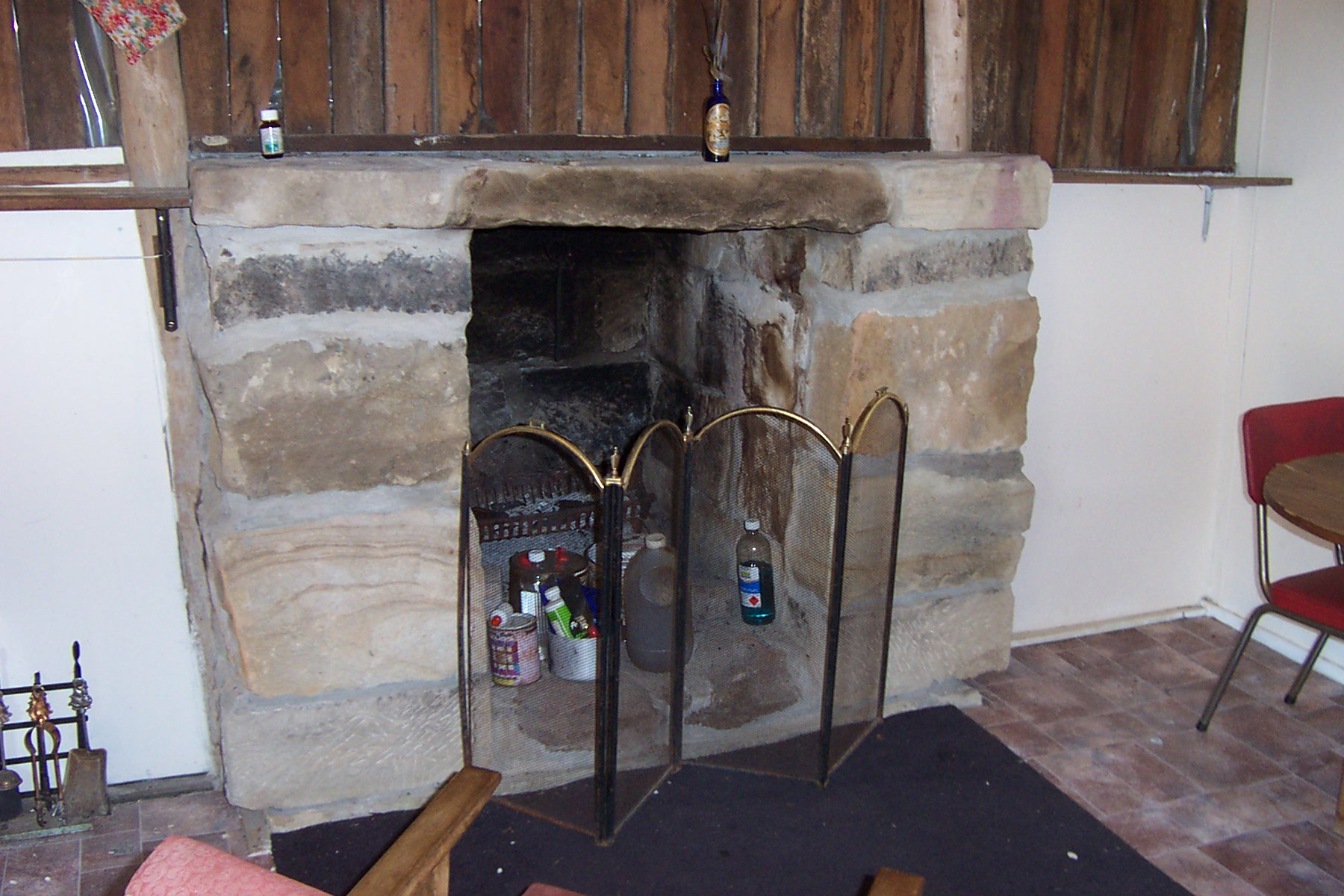
Stone fireplace in slab hut, Paynes Crossing Road, Wollombi

When settlement moved beyond Sydney Cove, an abundance of suitable forest timber became available. Huts and humpies made entirely from timber poles and large sheets of bark were easily erected, but these were often only temporary structures. (Note: Some log huts were built, but 'the tradition had died out in Europe'. Lewis, Australian Building: A Cultural Investigation 2.02.10) Local timbers presented a fresh challenge to the European settler. Australian hardwoods were difficult to work, and tools were scarce or inadequate. Australia's colonists were forced to improvise again, and become their own craftsmen. (Note: Lewis, 5.02.1. Lewis also notes the local evolution of tools suited for Australian woodworking.)

In time, buildings of timber slabs became a familiar feature of rural Australia. Some were public and long-lasting structures: shops, schools and churches; even substantial homesteads were built of slabs. (Note: See Lucas, Australian Country Houses. Examples include Cressbrook, Gracemere, The Springs.) Others were no more than hovels. As workmanship and tools improved, the slab structure became more permanent and sophisticated, eventually to become an icon of Colonial Australia, as evocative of time and place and humble beginnings as the thatched cottage of an English village or the log cabin of Early America. (Note: In a letter dated 1844, a settler wrote that the word 'hut' was the preferred local usage over 'cottage', for her slab dwelling. (see Starr, Pioneering New England) but another, writing in 1817 of his new slab home, noted 'My wife said that she didn't like me to call it a hut, so I made a memo, to call it a cottage.' (see Thornley The Adventures of an Immigrant p. 43).)

=== The New Zealand settler ===
New Zealand's European settlers also had to adapt to local circumstances, building with whatever materials were available, and employing tools of poor quality, or even none at all. Settlers tended to use the Maori word whare (house), instead of 'hut', for a temporary or pioneer dwelling.

Ten pounds will go a long way towards putting up a sod hut; a cabin of outside slabs and refuse timber from the sawmills, or a serviceable tent with timber frame and sod chimney, sufficient to protect the inmates from the weather, and afford a temporary home at all events. There is, too, one great advantage [to] the immigrants hampering themselves at first with only slender households, for they may very soon find it to their interest to change their place of abode, in order to secure higher wages or engage in more congenial occupations...

== Materials ==
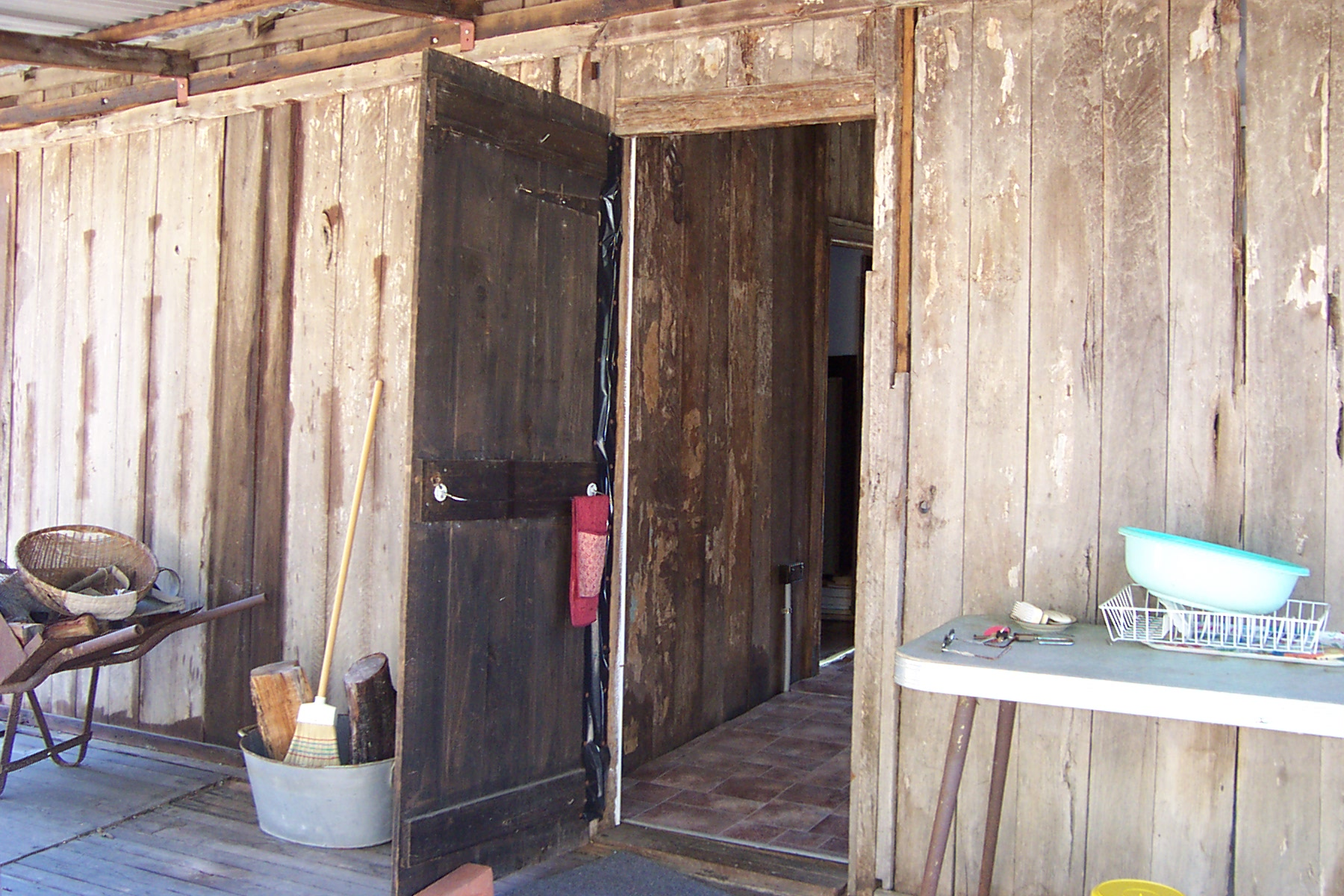
Rear of slab hut, Wollombi

In Australia

The usual slab hut was built entirely from timber and bark. Australian settlers found that the most fissile timbers were the Eucalypts: blackbutt, bluegum, stringybark, ironbark and turpentine. Some of these species are also termite resistant. The chimney, too, was often made of wood, although sometimes sods were used. The fireplace may have been given a lining of stones, sometimes covered with a plaster of mud or clay.

In New Zealand

Settlers used a thatch of raupo, toitoi, flax, fern, or totara bark; they erected tents from poles, saplings, canvas, and planks or split slabs; and made tree-fern huts or more permanent dwellings from clay, sods, wattle and daub, or stone.

=== Walls ===
A slab hut is actually a 'slab-walled' structure. Its walls were, strictly speaking, built from 'flitches'. Slabs are sawn from a trunk, flitches are split from it. (Note: Sydney J. Baker states that this Australian use of 'slab' dates from 1829. Baker, The Australian Language Chapter IV: 3 'Dwellings') Hut-builders felled selected trees, (Note: Rawson, Australian Enquiry Book recommends trees ten inches in diameter as likely to be both sound, and easiest to handle.) and sawed the trunks into suitable lengths. (Note: Harris gives eight feet for this length (Harris, Chapter V) others give ten feet. (Lewis, 2.03.3)) They then split these lengths into flitches using a maul and a wedge. (Note: Lewis notes that by the 1840s, traveling teams of sawyers could be hired for this work) Timber was split tangentially, that is, along the grain, instead of by the traditional British radial method, from the core of the trunk out towards the bark. There was neither time nor tools suitable to properly dress timber into planks, nor to season the timber; it was used green.

=== Roofs and ceilings ===
Rafters would be fixed atop the slab walls, and a pitched roof erected. The dimensions of the hut would be kept small, to avoid the need for roof trusses. Joists were not always laid, and a ceiling was not always included. A Queensland example can be seen here. If a ceiling was added, it was chiefly used for storage. Slab dwellings with a second storey were almost unknown.

A bark roof was common, and was quickly and easily erected.

... the roof [was] covered with forest box or stringy-bark, which was stripped from the

living trees in sheets of about six feet long and from two to four feet wide, laid upon rafters composed of small sapling poles just as they came from being cut in the bush. The sheets of bark, having holes pierced through each in pairs, were then tied on the rafters with cords twisted of the inner rind of the kurrajong tree. The whole framing of the roof was secured as it was needed by wooden pins in order to save the expense of nails, which were then both too scarce and too dear to be used by the lower order of settlers.

Indeed, all kinds of ironwork were equally inaccessible, and instead of hinges to tie doors or window shutters, those appurtenances were all made to revolve on wooden pivots in holes, bored a short distance into the

corresponding parts of the frames.

Thatching was less common, but cumbungi (rushes), and blady grass were used if available. Later, when crops were grown, straw was used. For a more permanent dwelling shingles would be cut. The cabbage tree palm was found most suitable, and later the she-oak. In later years, galvanised iron became a popular roofing material, due to its cheapness and durability. Sometimes this was laid over the original shingles. (Note: Henry Lawson commented, however, 'God forgive the man who invented galvanised iron, and the greed which introduced it into Australia: you could not get a worse roofing material for a hot country.' Lawson, Stragglers) Mrs Gunn noted that 'Great sheets of bark... were packed a foot deep above the rafters to break the heat reflected from the iron roof, while beneath it the calico ceiling was tacked up.'

Linings, plasters and claddings

Whether or not a slab hut was lined, inside or out, depended on the economic means, the energy and skill, and the taste of the occupants. Beyond the need for simple weatherproofing lay the desire for some aesthetic satisfaction.

Battens might be nailed over the gaps between slabs, or the entire exterior might be clad with weatherboards. The exterior might then be painted, using mixes of materials as diverse as skim milk, quick-lime, lampblack and cement or plastered over entirely. All these measures were less to do with appearance than with preservation of the fabric of the building.

The split timbers are put in quite rough, and chipped all over with the axe to insure adhesion of the coat of plaster. This plaster is composed of alluvial soil, mixed with a portion of cow-dung to prevent it from cracking, and with chopped grass to enable it to adhere, the coat being put on with a light spade and smoothed over with a plasterer's trowel. It is run over occasionally afterwards with the trowel to fill in the cracks; and on being quite dry, whitewashed with lime, plaster of Paris, or apple-tree ashes and sour milk, the latter forming a tolerable substitute for lime as whitewash.

The interior might have a coating of plaster made from a variety of available ingredients: mud, clay, cow-dung. The inside face of the slabs might be whitewashed, or have newspaper pasted over them. More elaborate linings might cover the ceiling, and include sailcloth, hessian, calico, osnaburg, even wallpaper, cretonne or chintz. Mrs Aeneas Gunn describes making 'a huge mosquito-netted dining room, big enough to enclose the table and chairs, so as to ensure our meals in comfort... we hoped to find a paradise at mealtimes in comparison with the purgatory of the last few months.'

=== Floors ===
Floors might consist of the original ground upon which the hut was erected, but various mixtures of sand, clay, cow-dung, and similar materials were laid to make a firmer, more level, or harder-wearing indoor surface. Termite mounds, crushed and watered, had many of the properties of poured concrete when used as flooring material. Termites mix their saliva, faeces and other substances to bind soil particles and form their mound: this type of flooring was known as 'ant bed'. All of these substances or mixes required regular maintenance, either by watering them to re-solidify the materials, or by spreading a new layer of mixture on top.

Timber slabs might also be laid directly on the earth to form a floor. More sophisticated and permanent dwellings had properly sawn floorboards nailed onto bearers.

== Design and construction ==
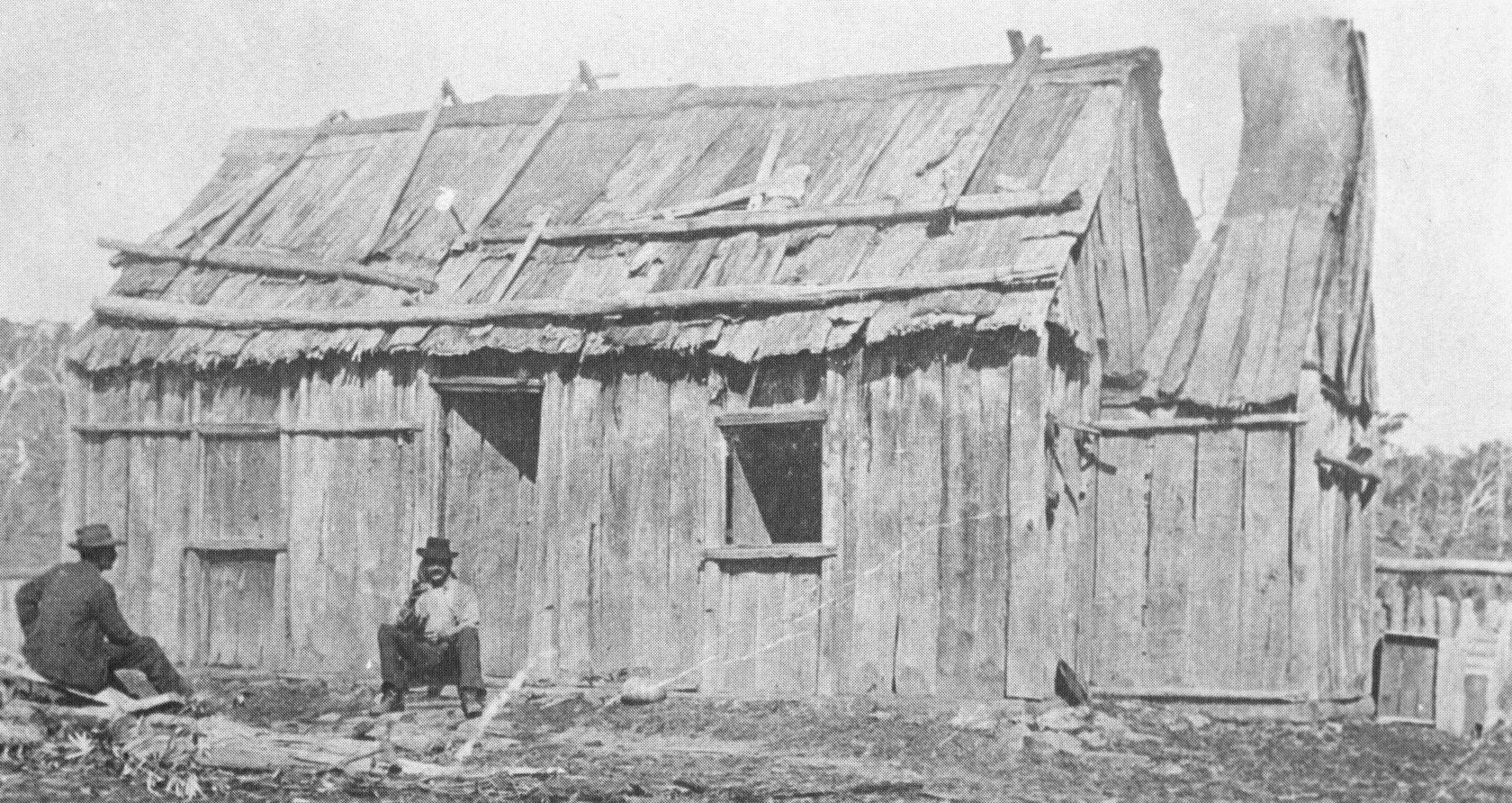
Slab Hut, Belle Vue Station, Glencoe, NSW c. 1898

The basic slab hut derived its plan from the vernacular English crofter's hut, a simple rectangular walled shelter with one door, and perhaps holes to allow air to enter. The interior spaces might later be partitioned off. To this design Australian settlers often added a verandah.

Most slab-hut construction techniques could be described as bush carpentry. Few early settlers could afford the time, or possessed the capital, to build any dwelling more impressive than a slab hut: they had first to clear their land and get a crop planted or pasture fenced. In later years, according to the terms of their purchase, selectors had to erect and occupy a dwelling on their land as soon as possible. (Note: This was to prevent 'dummying'. Wealthy squatters bought up multiple lots in the name of their agent or relatives (a 'dummy' owner), to discourage selectors by making good land hard to get.) On the goldfields, or timber-getting, only a temporary dwelling, produced quickly from available materials, was thought necessary.

Since a majority of early settlers had formerly been manual labourers, they brought with them a sound practical ability and aptitude for 'making do'; other settlers observed or helped those more skilled and copied their techniques. The average settler could thus erect a basic hut in two or three weeks, adding to or modifying it later.

The two preferred methods of slab hut construction differed chiefly in the placement of the wall slabs: vertically or horizontally.

Vertical slab wall

Alexander Harris described the vertical method of slab hut construction:

The first step of its erection was digging post-holes,

of about two feet deep... in which were placed posts ten feet high, squared on the four sides with the axe... Along the ground between these... were laid ground-plates and wall-plates... having a groove of about an inch and a half wide and two inches deep mortised into the flat sides their whole length. Into these grooves were fitted the two ends of the eight-feet slabs we had split with the maul and wedges... The flooringboards... were six inches wide and one [inch] thick; timber being used so green, and the heat being so great, boards of any greater width turn up at the edges, so as in time to look like a row of spouts. The rooms were all joisted at top, and on the joists was spread a floor of bark, so as to form, over the whole top of the house, the settler's usual first rude granary. Squares of a couple of feet.. were left open in the wall in various places for windows... The chimneys were large, like those of old farm-houses, and, for security, had a little wall of rough stone and mortar run up inside about three feet; and in the middle of the fire-place was a large flag-stone, of a sort capable of resisting the fire,

which constituted the hearth and baking-place.

Surgeon Peter Cunningham, advising potential settlers, described a similar method, and added:

... by this means a wooden house may be put up without having more than a dozen nails in its composition. I have known the frame of a house of this description, twenty-four feet long by twelve broad, with a back-skilling, or lean-to, of the same length seven feet wide attached to it, put up for the small sum of eight pounds, exclusive of plastering. The house was thatched, had a chimney, and was divided into four compartments; and with the additional plastering, whitewashing, and fitting of doors and windows, I do not think exceeded twenty pounds... A veranda tends materially to the coolness of the habitation, by sheltering the walls from the sun...

If only a top plate was used, the top of each slab was pushed up into the groove (a mortise). The bottom of the slab was merely set into a trench. When a wall bottom plate was used, it was also mortised. (Note: Edwards, Australian Traditional Bush crafts p. 19 observes that such a groove would fill with rainwater; a half-groove was preferred.) Each slab was slid in at one end of these plates; on the bottom plate, an extra piece was cut out at one end of the groove to widen it and allow each slab to be fitted in: this piece was replaced after the last slab was inserted. Another method was to make a much deeper mortise in the top plate. In this case, each slab was lifted up into the deep top groove and then dropped into the bottom one. A third method was to nail planks either side of the wall plates to form a channel to hold the slabs, instead of mortising. This was a much quicker method of construction, but it required the use of sawn and dressed timber, and nails. Slabs were sometimes chamfered at one or both ends to fit into the mortises. Each method took more time and labour, and used more material, but produced a progressively more sophisticated and permanent structure.

== Vertical slab walled church circa 1838 ==
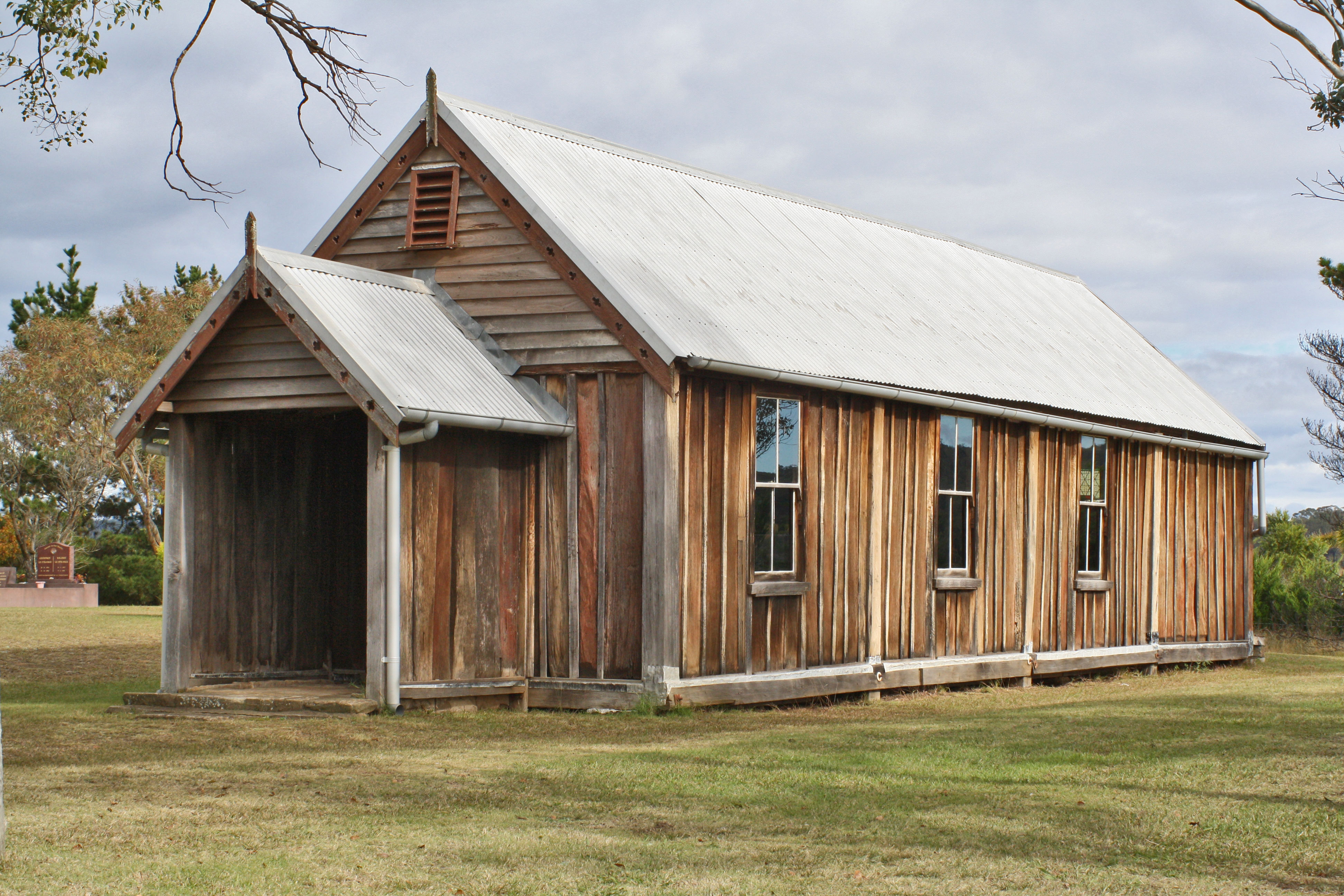
St Matthew's Church
The Oaks, NSW

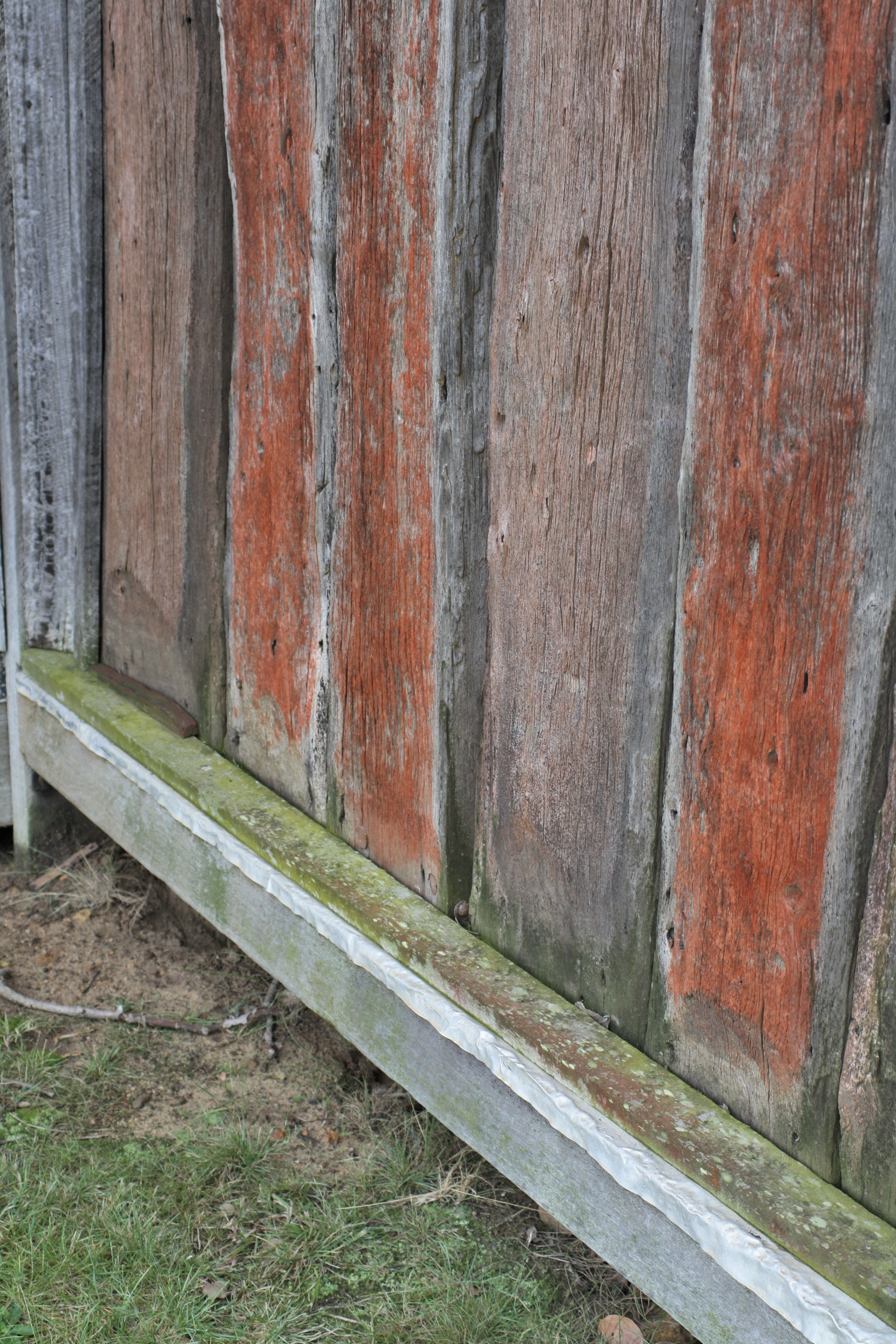
Slabs chamfered
to fit bottom plate

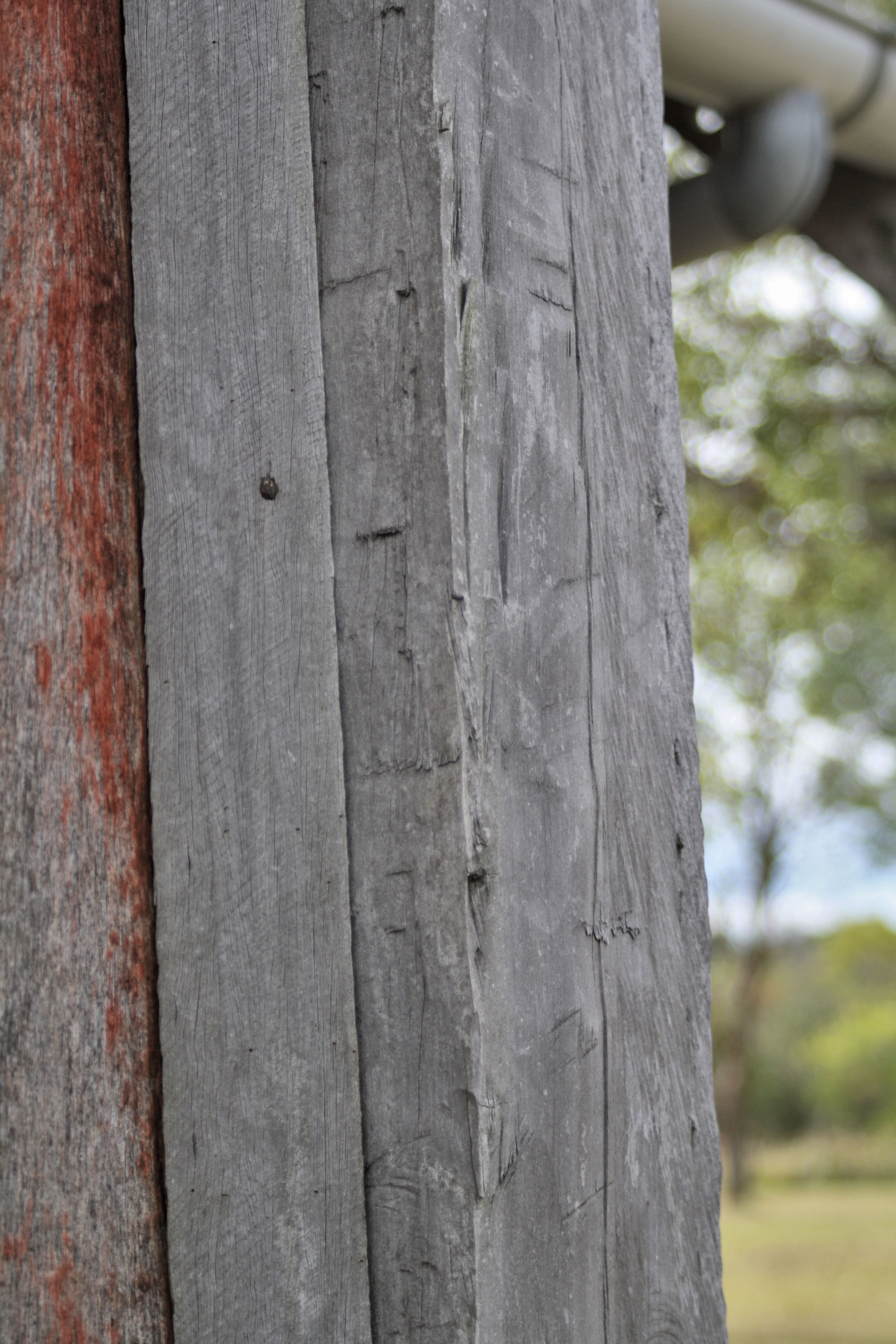
Corner post of undressed timber

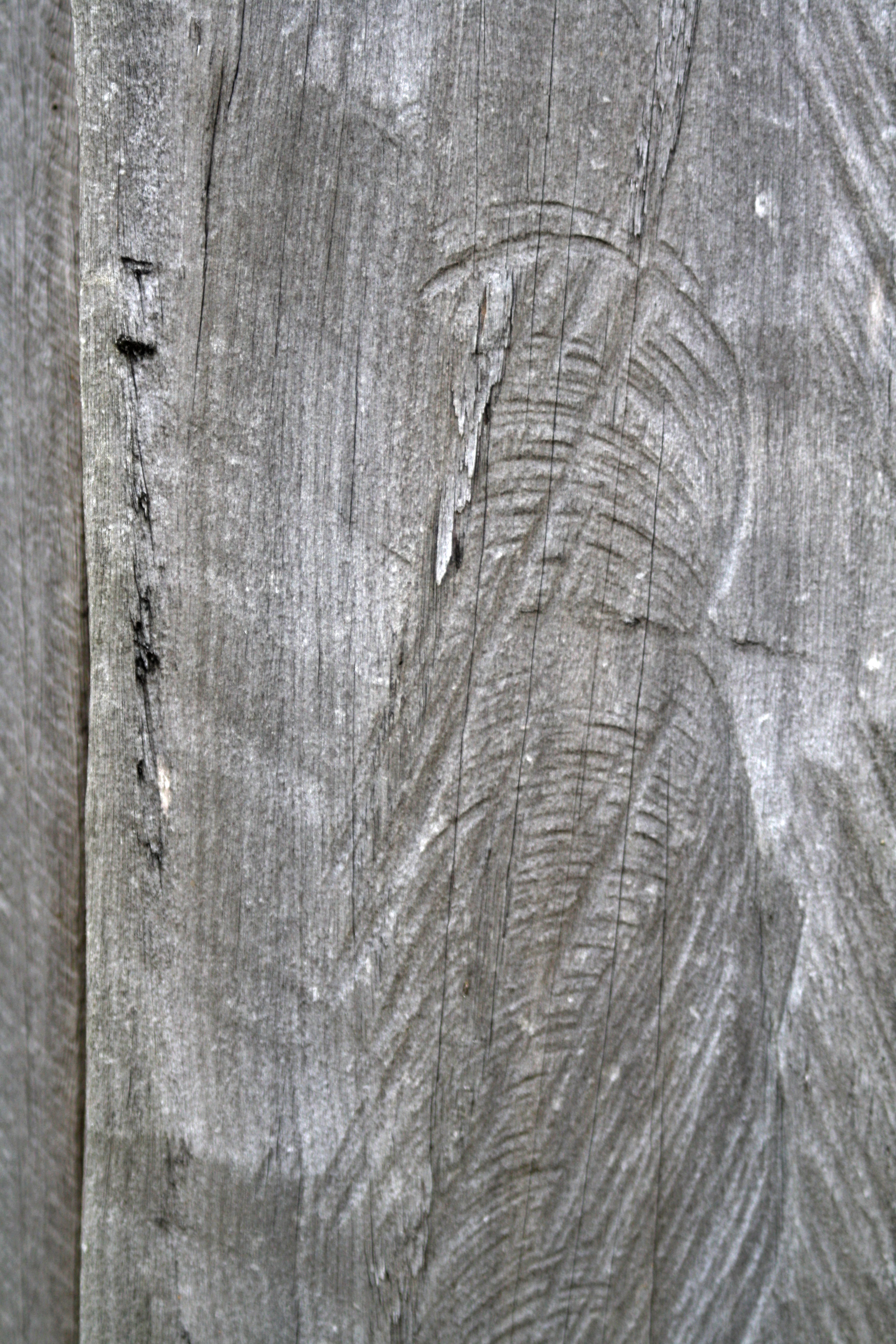
Saw-marks in corner post

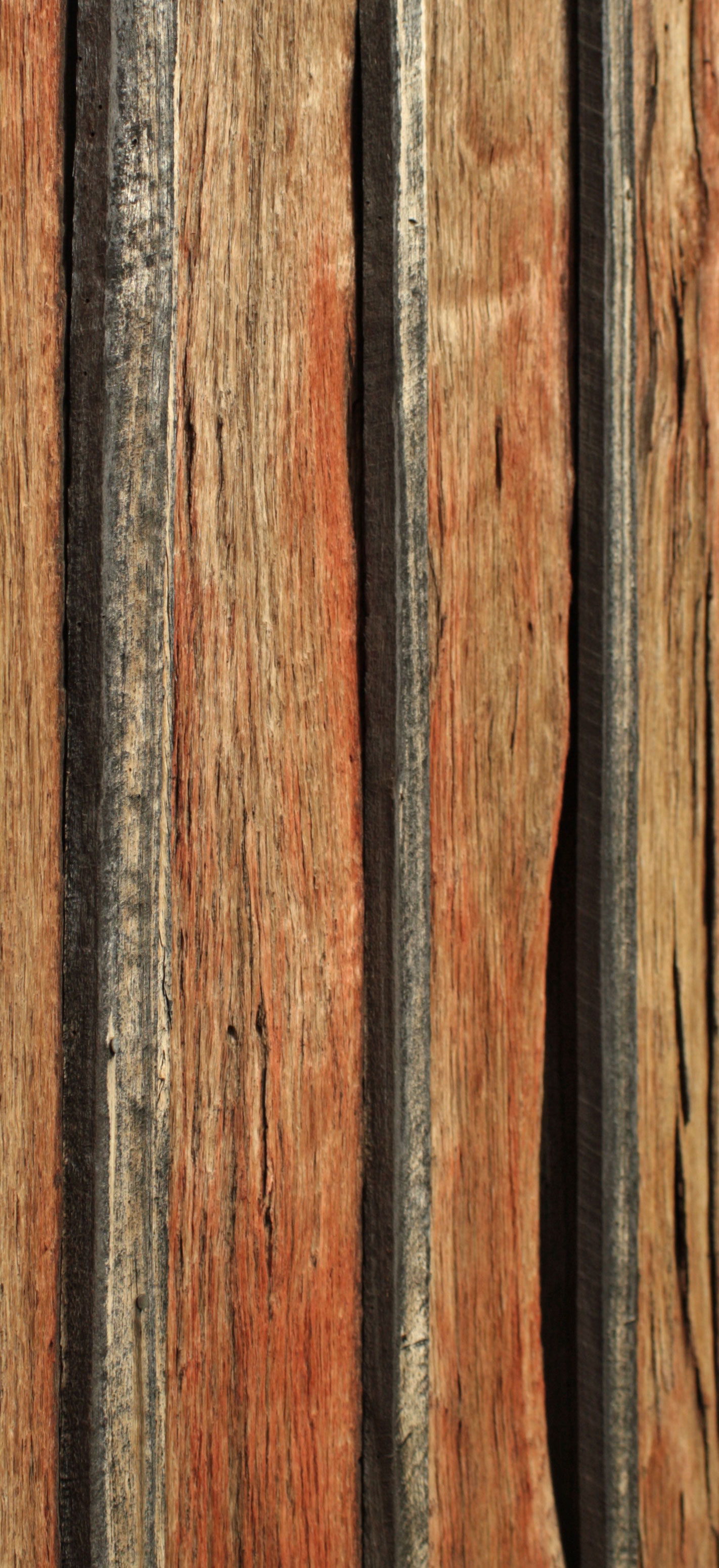
Battens nailed over gaps

Horizontal slab wall

Mrs Aeneas Gunn wrote of their Northern Territory homestead:

The walls are erected by what is known as the drop-slab-panel system - upright panels formed of three-foot slabs cut from the outside slice of tree-trunks, and dropped horizontally, one above the other, between grooved posts - a simple arrangement, quickly run up and artistic in appearance - outside, a horizontally fluted surface, formed by the natural curves of the timber, and inside, flat, smooth walls. (Note: Lewis 2.04.11, disputes the generality of the term 'drop-slab-system' for horizontal slabbing, and suggests that it derives from Mrs Gunn herself.) As in every third panel there was a door or a window, and as the horizontal slabs stopped within two feet of the ceiling, the building was exceedingly airy, and open on all sides.

In this case, too, instead of grooving the posts, a channel might be made by nailing battens either side of the uprights, and the slabs fitted inside these.

It is not clear which of these two methods was the more popular. (Note: Archer p. 68, claims the horizontal method was more favoured; Lewis, 2.04.11 suggests the opposite.) Examples of each remain. The shearing shed shown in this illustration c. 1890 has walls of both vertical and horizontal slabs; the latter may have been a later addition. The horizontal method had the advantage that shorter slabs (known as 'billets') of timber could be used, but more uprights had to be erected and mortised to hold these.

== In Australian literature ==
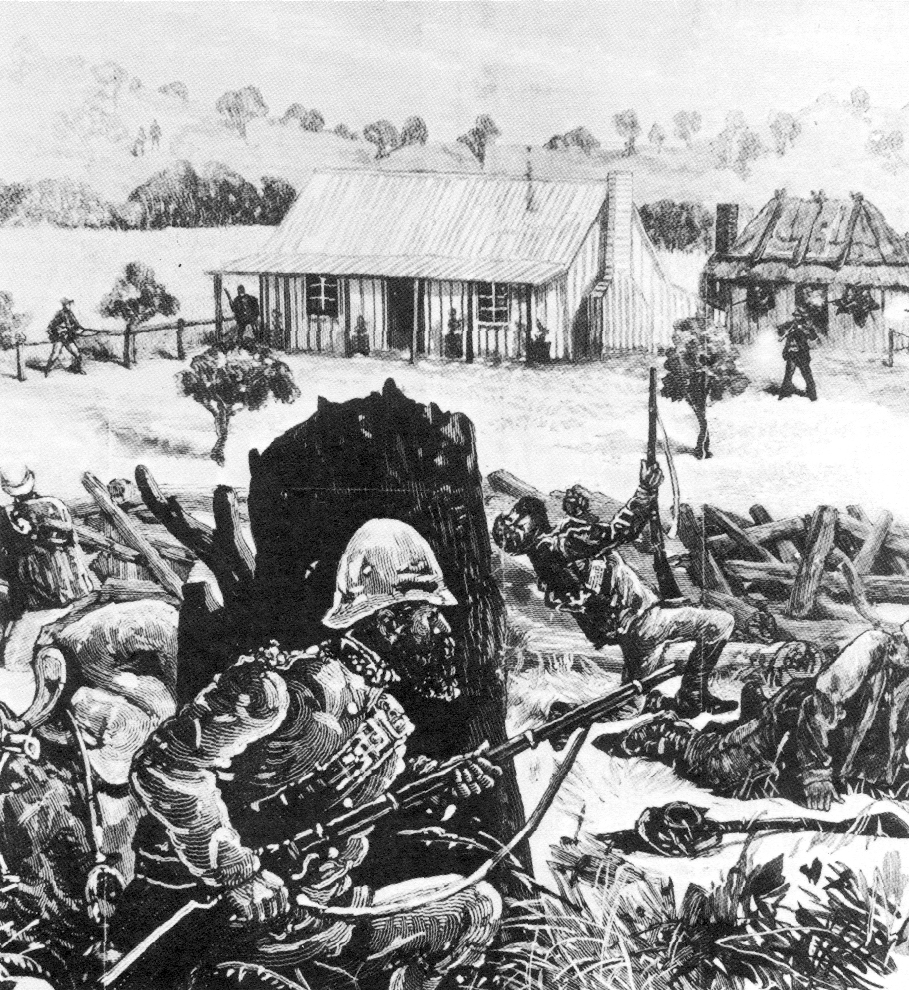
Police duel with bushrangers: The Australasian Sketcher 1879 Slab-built farm buildings set the scene.

The slab hut is mentioned often in classic Australian literature.

In works of fiction, Henry Lawson's Drover's Wife lives in a slab hut; so does his Bush Undertaker, and much of A Day on a Selection is set in or around one. A horizontal-slab shearing shed is the scene for Stragglers, and Lawson remarks of this makeshift structure, '... the whole business reminds us of the "cubby house" style of architecture of our childhood.'

Miles Franklin's Sybylla Melvyn grew up in a 'comfortable, wide-veranda'ed, irregularly built slab house' in the Timlinbilly Ranges and she was educated at 'Stringybark Hill Public... a little slab school house.' Richard Mahony hurriedly renovates his goldfields house and general store, so it will be fit for his new wife to occupy 'That her ears should not be polluted by the worst language of the customers he ran up a partition... cutting off the slab-walled portion of the house, with its roof of stringy-bark, from the log and canvas front. He also stopped with putty the worst gaps between the slabs...' Geoffrey Hamlyn recollects 'the old slab hut' at Baroona 'now quite overwhelmed' by the new, long, low house, the result of 'dull, stupid prosperity'.

Steele Rudd's Our New Selection describes the first house his farming family built:

It was a slabbed house, with shingled roof, and space enough for two rooms, but the partition wasn't up. The floor was earth, but Dad had a mixture of sand and fresh cow-dung with which he used to keep it level. About once every month he would put it on, and everyone had to keep outside that day till it was dry. There were no locks on the doors. Pegs were put in to keep them fast at night, and the slabs were not very close together, for we could easily see anybody coming on horseback by looking through them. Joe and I used to play at counting the stars through the cracks in the roof.

In biographical writings, Louisa Anne Meredith considered such 'habitations... the least pleasing objects one meets with in this colony,' but her objections were chiefly to the poor initial construction and subsequent neglect of those dwellings. This arose, she claimed, from the high wages paid due to the shortage of labour, and therefore the idleness and drunkenness of the 'working classes'. Writing of a convict-owned and operated theatre, Ralph Rashleigh says 'The theatre.... had few external charms. It was formed only of slabs and bark; yet the interstices of the walls being filled in with mud, and the whole of the interior whitewashed with pipeclay, of which there was abundance near, it produced no despicable effect by candlelight.' (Note: Tucker, Ralph Rashleigh Chapter XII. He also describes several other slab structures, and the problems caused by use of unseasoned timber)

Rachel Henning describes the construction of their slab-built homestead on their Queensland station. The house was relocated during her time there. Henning remarks, 'It is not much to move a slab house; all the woodwork takes down and puts up again; some of the roof may have to be new, but nothing else.'

Mrs Aeneas Gunn writes of the satisfaction derived from building their slab homestead, 'beginning at the beginning of things': choosing, felling and sawing their own timber. In his A Fortunate Life, Bert Facey describes his method of building a slab house for a farmer, having watched and helped others to build such structures several times during his life.

== In New Zealand literature ==
Frank Melton's Luck (1891):

I've bought that big block of land ten miles north of here. Shall want you to go up and manage it. Take up Tom Hardy with you. He'll look after the cattle and cook. Then those two contractor fellows will soon run you up a slab hut. A tent will do till it's ready.

In the Shadow of the Bush (1899):

A large clearing opened out on the right, and a little way back from the road-line stood a slab hut—or wharé, as it is generally called in New Zealand... A building of but one apartment... constructed entirely of split timber, but neatly put together. The roof was of iron, as was also the chimney. The latter, deep and wide, extended nearly across the whole of one end, and formed almost a small compartment of its own. Its dimensions, however, were but in keeping with the supply of firewood outside; and it is only in the bush districts that such fireplaces are to be seen... Two small windows gave light to the apartment.

A Maori Maid (1898):

On a low hill-side, with a clump of bush close behind, stood the rough whare. The roof was thatched with totara bark. The walls consisted of unplaned slabs of totara wood about six feet long, placed vertically side by side. There was no lining, and there were no flooring boards; only the hard dry clay. The window was a mere opening with a piece of white linen stretched across in place of glass... Almost the whole of one end of the hut consisted of fireplace. The chimney was built of wood. At the bottom large stones, cemented together with clay and mud, formed a rough lining and a protection from the flames... John's present country home was as rough and unpretentious as it well could be. He was pursuing the wise course of putting every available penny into improvements that would bring in some profit... Time enough to build a good homestead when he had a good woolshed...

== In Australian and New Zealand art ==
S. T Gill, Diggings in the Mount Alexander district of Victoria in 1852

The landscapes of Augustus Earle, and S.T. Gill usually show one or more slab structures; Gill even illustrated the process of splitting timber for slabs. William Strutt's sketch of a settler's hut shows the tools used to build it, while John Skinner Prout's Interior of Settlers Hut Australia emphasizes the crudity of technique and bulkiness of the timbers. It also shows the timber fireplace and chimney. Strutt in 1856, also sketched a New Zealand settler's 'whorry'. William Swainson, John Barr Clark Hoyte, Frances Mary Hodges and Charles Blomfield, among others, produced paintings of slab wharves and other structures. (Note: Images of works by these artists are available on-line at the Alexander Turnbull Library)

The deterioration of the hut depicted by Nicholas Chevalier in his Buffalo Ranges supports Louisa Meredith's observation about poor upkeep by many hut occupants. Unk White's 1960s sketches of Tyrrell's Vineyard in the Hunter Valley include a slab hut dating from 1858.

The 'backblocks' humour of Australian cartoonists of the Smith's Weekly school such as Alex Gurney, Percy Leason, Stan Cross and Eric Jolliffe often included slab huts as a backdrop to their gags. Jolliffe also published detailed sketches of slab structures still standing, to preserve Australian heritage. In journalism, illustrations of rural towns and farms in Australian newspapers and magazines of the Colonial era often show slab huts and homes. Examples can be seen in The Australasian Sketcher, (Note: See The Australasian Sketcher Nov. 1878. The slab hut depicted in this issue near Stringybark Creek was allegedly occupied by the Kelly Gang.) The Sydney Mail and Sydney Punch.

== A contemporary slab dwelling ==
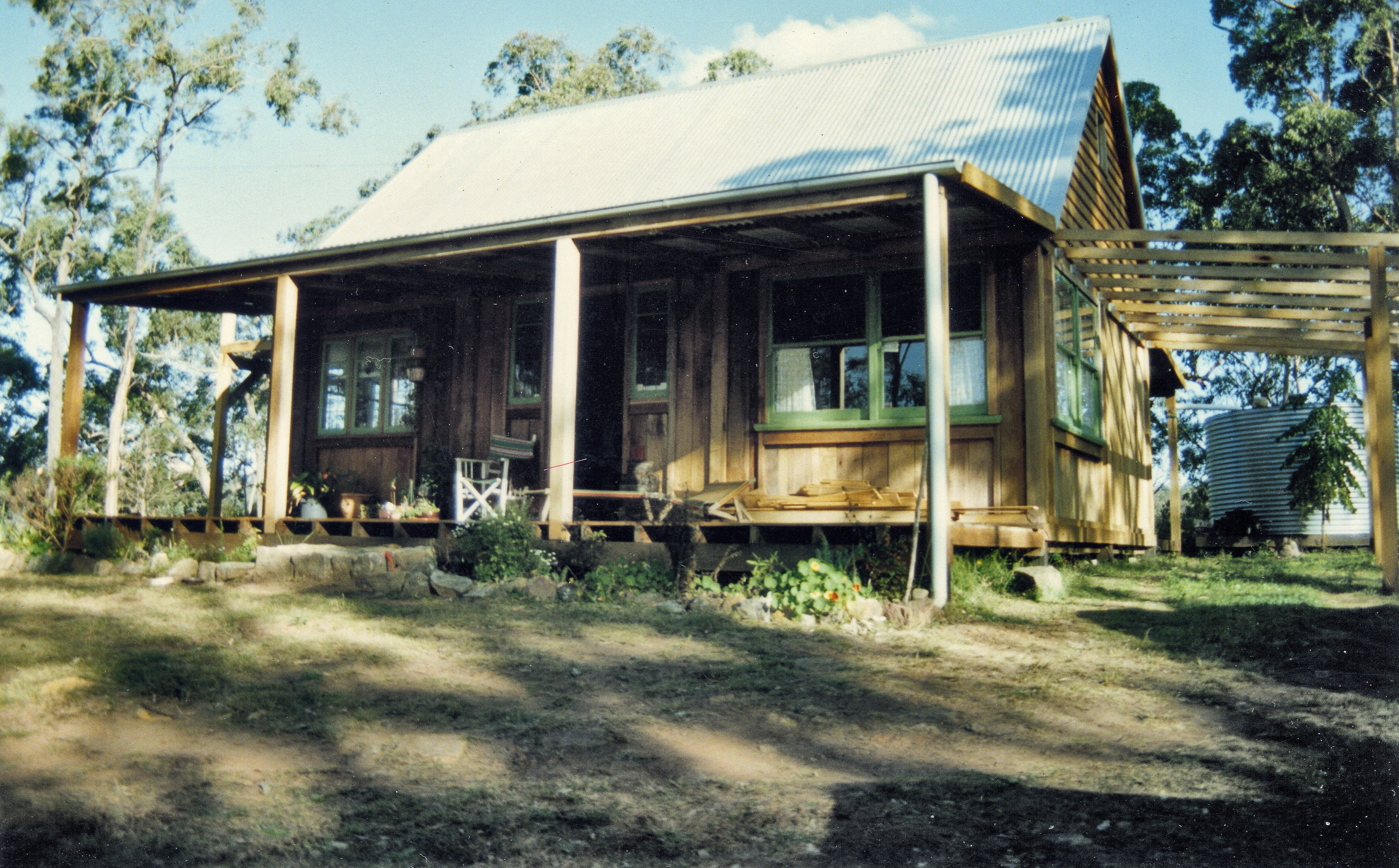
Fig. 1

This slab-walled house (Fig. 1) was built in 1992, in the Watagan Ranges of New South Wales.

It varies from the traditional design in several respects. It is raised off the ground on stumps (Fig. 5); the slab walls are of sawn timber, not flitches split from a trunk (Fig 2.); it uses the nailed 'channel' method of holding the slabs, not mortises; the spaces between the slabs are filled with foam-rubber strips (Fig. 5); no attempt has been made to line or clad the house (Fig. 3); it has no chimney or fireplace as part of the structure; the floor is of chipboard.

More akin to traditional structures, the roof has no joists, and there is no ceiling; the entire pitch of the roof forms the interior space, allowing for cooling in summer; the gable-ends are framed with studs and filled in with weatherboards (Fig. 4). The walls are kept square by a mezzanine floor, reached by an internal spiral staircase, making the house in effect a two-storey structure (Fig. 3).

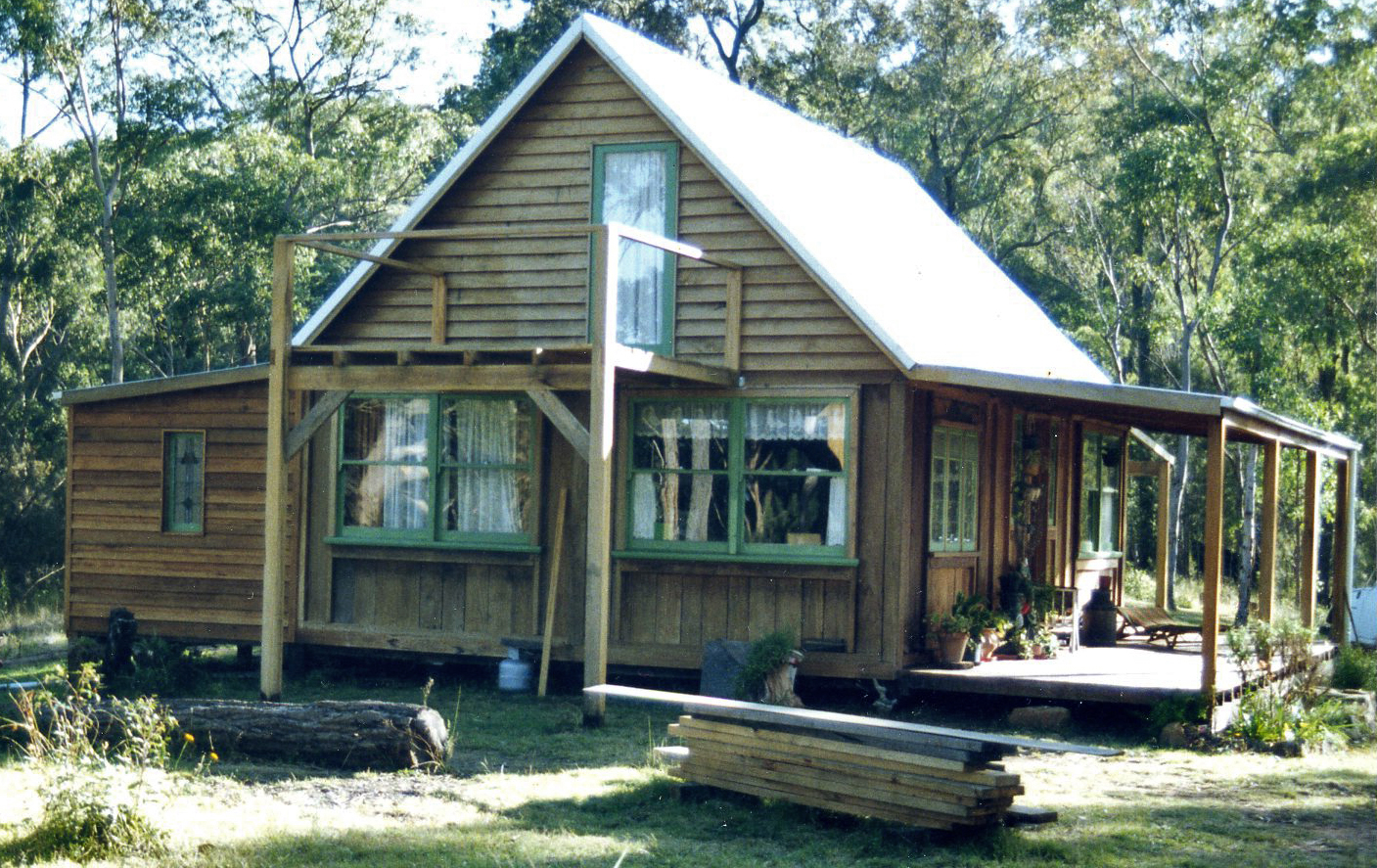
Fig. 2

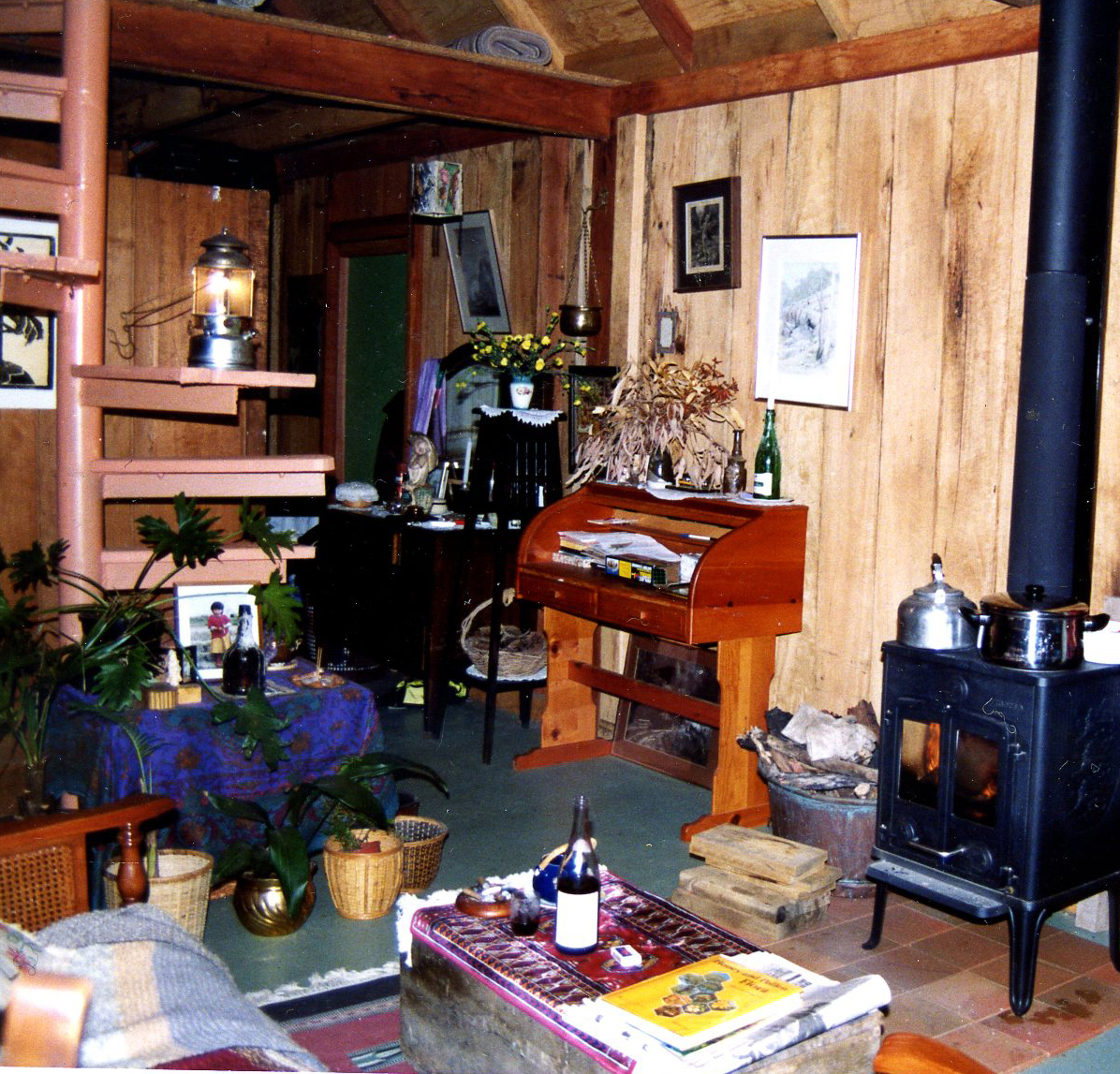
Fig. 3

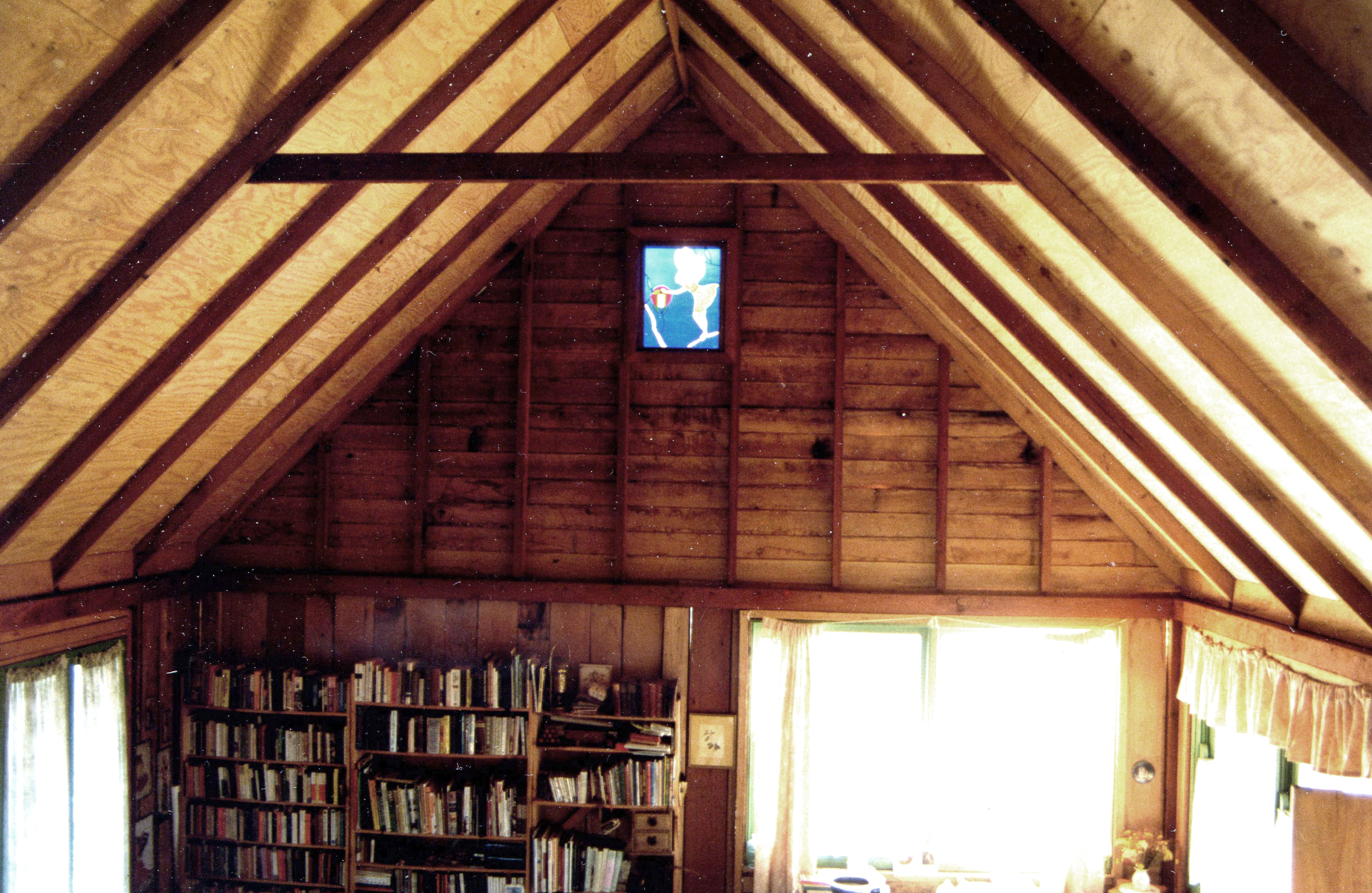
Fig. 4

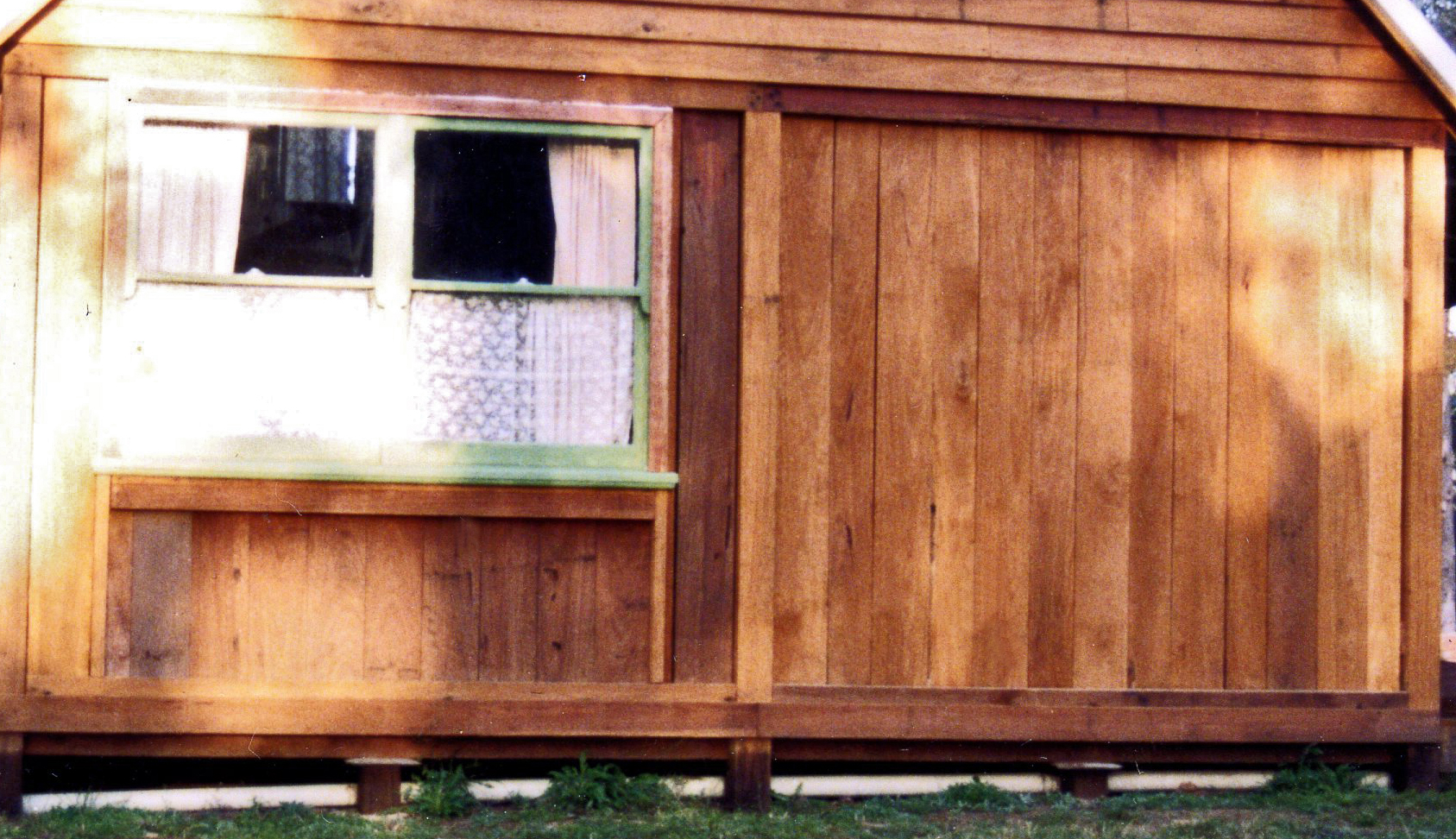
Fig. 5

== Notes and references ==
Notes

== Bibliography and further reading ==
- Adams, David. ed. 1986. The Letters of Rachel Henning. Angus and Robertson, Sydney. ISBN 0-207-14981-X See her letters of 18 October 1862; 10 August 1863.
- Anderson, R. H. 1956. The Trees of New South Wales. Pettifer, Government Printer, Sydney. See pp xvi-ii
- Archer, John. 1996. The Great Australian Dream: the history of the Australian house. HarperCollins, Pymble. ISBN 0-207-19003-8
- Atkinson, James. 1844. An account of the state of agriculture & grazing in New South Wales (1826) See Chapter VI: pp. 135–140, Second Edition
- Australian Wood Review : Issue 36 Sept 2002. 'Slab Hut Skills'
- Baker, Sidney J. 1966. The Australian Language: an examination of the English language and English speech as used in Australia, from convict days to the present [...] Currawong, Sydney.
- Boyd, Robin. 1968. Australia's Home: its origins, builders and occupiers. Pelican, Melbourne. ISBN 0-522-84358-1 See "Materials and Methods"
- Cousins, A. 1994. The Garden of New South Wales: a history of the Illawarra & Shoalhaven Districts 1770-1900. Illawarra Historical Society ISBN 0-909164-17-7 See "Settlement - Clearing Leases"
- Cox, P., & Lucas, C. 1978. Australian Colonial Architecture. Lansdowne. ISBN 1-86302-343-7
- Cox, P., & Freeland, J. 1969. Rude timber buildings in Australia. Thames and Hudson. ISBN 0-500-34035-8
- Cunningham, P. 1828. Two Years in New South Wales See Volume 2, Chapter VIII. Third edition
- Edwards, Ron. 1984. Australian Traditional Bush Crafts. Adelaide, Rigby, 1984. ISBN 0-7270-2042-0
- Evans, Ian. 1983. The Australian Home. Flannel Flower Press, Sydney. ISBN 0-9594923-2-1
- Freeland, J. M. 1974. Architecture in Australia. Pelican, 1974. See "The Primitives"
- Harris, Alexander. 1969. Settlers and convicts, or, Recollections of sixteen years' labour in the Australian backwoods, by an emigrant mechanic. Foreword by Manning Clark. Melbourne University Press, Melbourne. See Chapter V: 'How to Erect a Good Hut'
- Haygarth, Henry William. 1848. Recollections of Bush Life in Australia during a residence of eight years in the interior. John Murray, London. Chapter II "Bush architecture" Google Books
- Herman, Morton. 1954. The Early Australian Architects and Their Work. Angus and Robertson, Sydney. See 'In the beginning'.
- Kingston, Daphne. 1985. Early slab buildings of the Sydney region. Kangaroo Press. ISBN 0-86417-040-8 '100 accurate drawings... show where some of the surviving slab buildings can be seen'
- Lucas, Clive. 1987. Australian country houses : homesteads, farmsteads and rural retreats. Lansdowne Press, Sydney. ISBN 0-7018-1974-X
- Lewis, Miles. 2006. Australian Building: A Cultural Investigation
- McCrae, Hugh. (ed.) 1992. Georgiana's Journal.Sydney : Angus & Robertson, ISBN 0-207-17564-0
- Mann, Robert James. 1849. Mann's emigrant's guide to Australia : including the colonies of New South Wales, Port Philip, South Australia, Western Australia, and Moreton Bay London : William Strange.
- Meredith, Louisa Anne. 1861. Notes and Sketches of New South Wales: during a residence in the colony from 1839 to 1844. See 'Huts of the Working Classes'
- Rawson, L. 1894. Australian enquiry book of household and general information : a practical guide for the cottage, villa and bush home. Pater and Knapton. Kangaroo Press, 1984 facsimile reprint. ISBN 0-86417-056-4
- Rollo D. Arnold: The Farthest Promised Land — English Villagers, New Zealand Immigrants of the 1870s. Chapter 13 "New Zealand – Arden"
- Rudd, Steele. 1954. On Our Selection and Our New Selection. Angus and Robertson, Sydney. See "Starting the Selection"
- Starr, Joan. 1978. Pioneering New England Adelaide, Rigby. ISBN 0-7270-0882-X
- Troy, P. (ed.) 2000. A History of European Housing in Australia. Cambridge University Press, ISBN 0-521-77733-X
- Tucker, James. 1952. Ralph Rashleigh, or, The life of an exile by Giacomo di Rosenberg (James Tucker). See Chapter XI
- Wilkinson, G. B. 1849. The working man's handbook to South Australia, with advice to the farmer, and detailed information for the several class of labourers and artisans. London : Murray.
