= John Haygarth (cricketer) =

English cricketer

Personal information
- Full name: John William Haygarth
- Born: 3 December 1842; Rodmarton, Gloucestershire, England
- Died: 30 March 1923 (aged 80); Boonah, Queensland, Australia
- Batting: Right-handed
- Role: Wicket-keeper
- Relatives: Edward Haygarth (brother); Arthur Haygarth (second cousin); Francis Gresson (nephew)

Domestic team information
- Years: Team
- 1862–1864: Oxford University

Career statistics
Competition	First-class
Matches	10
Runs scored	81
Batting average	6.75
100s/50s	0/0
Top score	17
Catches/stumpings	12/12
- Source: Cricinfo, 4 May 2020

John William Haygarth (3 December 1842 – 30 March 1923) was an English first-class cricketer and magistrate.

The son of John Sayer Haygarth, he was born in December 1842 at Rodmarton, Gloucestershire. He was educated at Winchester College, before going up to Corpus Christi College, Oxford in 1861. While studying at Oxford, he played first-class cricket for Oxford University, making his debut against the Marylebone Cricket Club at Oxford in 1862. He played first-class cricket for Oxford until 1864, making ten appearances. Described by Wisden Cricketers' Almanack as “one of the best amateur wicket-keepers of his time”, he took twelve catches and stumpings in his ten matches for Oxford, in addition to scoring 81 runs.

He left England in 1865 and emigrated to Queensland, where he became a sheep farmer at Kooralbyn and later served as a magistrate. Haygarth died at Boonah in March 1923. His brother, Edward, also played first-class cricket, as did his second cousin Arthur Haygarth, was also the compiler of Scores and Biographies. Another cousin was William Parry-Okeden, an Australian police commissioner and protector of Aborigines, while his nephew, Francis Gresson, played cricket at first-class level.
