= Arthur Haygarth =

English cricketer and writer

Personal information
- Born: 4 August 1825; Hastings, Sussex, England
- Died: 1 May 1903 (aged 77); Pimlico, Westminster, London, England
- Batting: Right-handed
- Role: Batsman
- Relatives: John Haygarth (second cousin); Edward Haygarth (second cousin)

Domestic team information
- Years: Team
- 1844–1861: MCC
- 1848–1860: Sussex

Arthur Haygarth (4 August 1825 – 1 May 1903) was a noted English amateur cricketer who became one of cricket's most significant historians. He played for the Marylebone Cricket Club and Sussex between 1844 and 1861, as well as numerous other invitational and representative teams including an England XI and a pre-county Middlesex. A right-handed bat, Haygarth played 136 matches, scoring 3,042 runs and taking 19 wickets with his part-time bowling. He was educated at Harrow, which had established a rich tradition as a proving ground for cricketers. He served on many MCC committees and was elected a life member in 1864.

Outside his playing career, Haygarth was a noted cricket writer and historian. He spent over sixty years compiling information and statistics. Of particular note was his compilation: Frederick Lillywhite's Cricket Scores and Biographies, published in 15 volumes between 1862 and 1879.

== Career ==
=== Playing career ===
Haygarth was born in Hastings, Sussex. He was the youngest of three children of William Haygarth (1784–1825), who died before he was born, and his wife Frances Parry (1794–1886), with older brothers Henry William Haygarth and Colonel Francis Haygarth. Though only he out of his brothers would go on to play cricket, he also had two cousins John Haygarth and Edward Haygarth, who played.

Haygarth attended Harrow School, where he played and enjoyed compiling information and statistics of current and past cricketers. He played several matches for Harrow through 1842 and 1843 against Eton College, Winchester School and the MCC.

In his playing days he was, according to Wisden, a "capable exponent of the game." From 1844 he played for the MCC against pre-county teams, and made his debut in a Gentlemen of England v Gentlemen of Kent fixture. Played at Lord's, Haygarth made four and 19 batting for the Gentlemen of England though he did not bowl. Haygarth would go on to play for a great multitude of teams in his career. As well as the MCC and Middlesex, he played at the invitation of Fuller Pilch for the F Pilch's XI in 1846, for the Earl of Winterton and the Earl of Leicester, Viscount Mountgarret and the Earl of Stamford, for the Fast Bowlers XI, South of England, and Old Harrovians. Though he also played three matches for Sussex, and twelve matches for the England XI, the vast majority of his cricket was for the MCC. He played 69 matches for the club in total, scoring over 1,600 runs including four half-centuries and his career best 97 which came in 1855.

=== Cricket writer and historian ===
Haygarth assisted with cricket coaching regularly until 1870, walking to Harrow from his home in central London. Meanwhile, he preoccupied himself with writing and amassing information on cricket. Initially a hobby, it grew to become a profession as more and more of his works were published. The then-captain of Surrey requested a copy of his collections with the intention to publish them in 1852, however several delays postponed the publication by ten years. The first volume of Frederick Lillywhite's Cricket Scores and Biographies was published 1862, with the next thirteen editions being released at intervals until 1895. It contains all the information obtainable from 1746 to 1878, with a supplement concerning notable players for the next 20 years. The volumes appeared at fairly regular intervals between 1862 and 1879. The first four, bound in purple cloth, were published by Fred Lillywhite, son of William Lillywhite. Volume 1 covering the 1744 to 1826 seasons is by far the most significant as it is the main source of reference data for late 18th century cricket.

The last 11 editions, bound in red cloth, with gilded lettering and ornamented with an armorial design of a shield embodying the stumps, bat and ball, were produced at the sole expense of the MCC. At this point, however, the MCC opted to discontinue funding as the works were no longer profitable. The fifteenth and last volume of Scores and Biographies did not appear until 23 years after Haygarth's death.

=== Death and memorial ===
Haygarth died in 1903 in Pimlico, Westminster, London. Wisden in its obituary named him "a famous cricketer, whose name will always be gratefully recalled as long as the game continues to be played." He is buried at West Brompton Cemetery. A green plaque, unveiled in November 2003, commemorates his home.
