= William Haygarth =

English poet, writer and artist

William Haygarth (1784–1825) was an English poet, writer and artist.

== Life ==
He was the elder son of John Haygarth, and was educated at Rugby School and Trinity College, Cambridge, where he matriculated in 1801. He graduated B.A. in 1804 and M.A. in 1808. He travelled in Greece from August 1810 to January 1811, supported by a fellowship from Trinity College, starting in the north-west, and journeying to Athens. While there he joined Lord Byron's circle.

Haygarth bought property at Holly Hill, Sussex in 1818, and married Frances Parry the following year. By 1824 he was seen to be suffering from consumption, and was treated as an invalid. He died on 25 September 1825; a memorial tablet to him was placed in Epsom church.

== Works ==
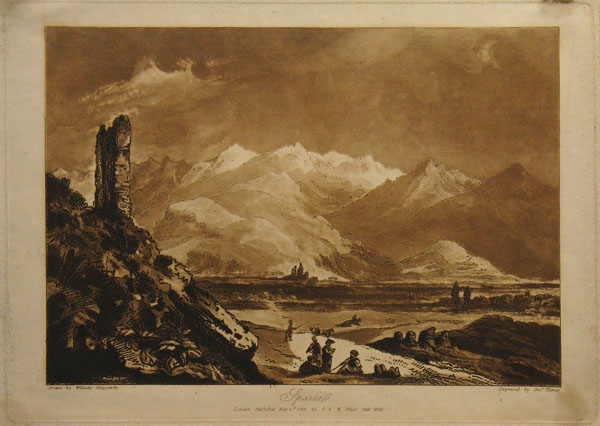
Sparta, 1814 mezzotint after William Haygarth

Greece, a Poem, the work for which Haygarth is known, was mostly written in Athens. He worked on it at Lambridge House, his parental home near Bath, Somerset, in 1813; and it was published in 1814. One of its themes is the valuing of artistic achievement over power. Haygarth's strong philhellene reaction to Corinth has been characterised as making it a "Tintern Abbey" for the Ottoman Empire. The main theme, the regeneration of Greece, was already a literary commonplace, to be followed shortly in Byron's Childe Harold's Pilgrimage, which eclipsed its rivals; the reason being, it has been argued, because he knew better the rhetoric to give the British audience, not because he knew more about Greece.

Haygarth also wrote articles for the Quarterly Review and the British Critic. For the Quarterly, he reviewed the ancient Roman history of William John Bankes, and the ancient Greek counterpart of William Mitford. He found fault with Mitford's history, as far as the writing went; Mitford and his anti-democratic views went down well with the Quarterly's Tory readership. Against the odds, given his moderate liberal politics, Haygarth was in with a chance of becoming its editor for much of 1823, as the publisher John Murray and outgoing editor William Gifford frustrated each other's plans for the succession. Murray wanted to break up the monolithic Toryism of the Quarterly, while Gifford insisted on a Canningite (liberal conservative), one of John Taylor Coleridge and William Nassau Senior. After an impasse, Murray agreed to Coleridge, who was in post only briefly, leaving Haygarth, already ailing, with a sense of grievance, to break off the relationship.

A substantial collection of Haygarth's paintings went to the Gennadius Library, purchased at auction in 1886. His library was sold by R. H. Evans at auction in London on 8 November 1827 (and nine following days). A copy of the catalogue is at Cambridge University Library (shelfmark Munby.c.131(9)).

== Family ==
William and Frances Haygarth had the following children:

- Francis, born 1820
- Henry William, cleric and writer, born 1821
- Twin girls who died young, born 1823.

Arthur, known as a cricketer, was born in 1826.
