= Home and Colonial Library =

The Home and Colonial Library was a series of works published in London from 1843 to 1849, comprising 49 titles, by John Murray III. He founded it, as a series of cheap reprints, original works and translations, slanted towards travel literature in the broad sense, in the year of death of his father, John Murray II.

== Listing ==
This listing of 44 titles of the Library, two of those coming in 2 vols., was published in 1876.

Author	Title
Charles Acland	Manners and Customs in India
Joseph Abbott	Missionary Life in Canada
John Barrow	Life of Sir Francis Drake
George Borrow	The Bible in Spain
George Borrow	Gypsies in Spain
Thomas Campbell	The British Poets
Charles Darwin	Voyage of a Naturalist
John Drinkwater	Siege of Gibraltar
John Hay Drummond-Hay	Morocco and the Moors
William Henry Edwards	The River Amazon
Richard Ford	Gatherings from Spain
Lord Ellesmere	The Sieges of Vienna
George Robert Gleig	Sale's Brigade in Afghanistan
George Robert Gleig	Campaigns at Washington
George Robert Gleig	The Battle of Waterloo
George Robert Gleig	Life of Lord Clive
George Robert Gleig	Life of Munro
Alexander Duff Gordon	Sketches of German Life
Lucie, Lady Duff-Gordon	The Amber Witch
Lucie, Lady Duff-Gordon	The French in Algiers
Alexis Guignard, comte de Saint-Priest	History of the Fall of the Jesuits
Henry William Haygarth	Bush Life in Australia
Sir Francis Bond Head, 1st Baronet	Stokers and Pokers
Sir Francis Bond Head, 1st Baronet	Pampas Journeys
Reginald Heber	Journal in India
Henry Herbert, 3rd Earl of Carnarvon	Portugal and Galicia
Charles Leonard Irby and James Mangles	Travels in the Holy Land
Matthew Gregory Lewis	Journal of a Residence Among the Negroes in the West Indies
Lord Mahon	Life of Condé
Lord Mahon	Historical Essays
Julia Charlotte Maitland	Letters from Madras: During the Years 1836-1839
John Malcolm	Sketches of Persia
Herman Melville	Typee and Omoo
Louisa Anne Meredith	Notes and Sketches of New South Wales
Edward Augustus Milman	The Wayside Cross; or, the Raid of Gomez, a tale of the Carlist War
Elizabeth Rigby,	Livonian Tales
"A Lady" (Elizabeth Rigby)	Letters from the Shores of the Baltic
Matteo Ripa	The Court of China
George Frederick Ruxton	Adventures in Mexico
Bayle St John	The Libyan Desert
Charles George William St John	Highland Sports
Robert Southey	Cromwell and Bunyan
Henrik Steffens	Autobiography
"A Lady" (missionary who used the pseudonym Mary Church)	Letters from Sierra Leone

Originally there were some extra titles, or works later substituted. Two books were often printed in one volume, and 49 works in all were in 37 volumes. Washington Irving's Bracebridge Hall, Traveller's Tales and Oliver Goldsmith were included. There were also the Memoirs of Sir Fowell Buxton. Melville's works Typee and Omoo were at first issued separately. Murray required that Typee appear as Four Months among the Natives of the Marquesas.
