= Edward Haygarth =

English sportsman

Personal information
- Full name: Edward Brownlow Haygarth
- Date of birth: 26 April 1854
- Place of birth: Cirencester, Gloucestershire, England
- Date of death: 14 April 1915 (aged 60)
- Place of death: Siddington, Gloucestershire, England
- Position: Full-back

Senior career*
Years	Team	Apps	(Gls)
?	Reading	?	(?)
?	Swifts	?	(?)

International career
1875	England	1	(0)
- Cricket career
Cricket information
- Batting: Right-handed
- Bowling: Unknown-arm underarm
- Role: Wicket-keeper
Domestic team information
- Years: Team
- 1875: Hampshire
- 1883: Gloucestershire
Career statistics
Competition	First-class
Matches	3
Runs scored	18
Batting average	3.60
100s/50s	–/–
Top score	7
Catches/stumpings	–/1
- Source: Edward Haygarth at Cricinfo
- * Club domestic league appearances and goals

Edward Brownlow Haygarth (26 April 1854 — 14 April 1915) was an English sportsman who represented the England national football team and played cricket at first-class level with both Gloucestershire and Hampshire.

== Life and sporting career ==
The son of John Sayer Haygarth, he was born at Cirencester in April 1854. He was educated at Lancing College, where he played for both the college cricket and football teams. After completing his education, he came to Reading to train as a solicitor. He played club football as a full back for Reading and Swifts. He was an important figure in the early history of Reading. Haygarth likely played in the club's first ever match and was recorded as the club's first goalscorer, in addition to scoring the club's first hat-trick and captaining the club. He was later inducted into the Reading F.C. Hall of Fame, with contributions to the early history of Reading were recognised on the club's 150th anniversary, when a hospitality suite at the Madejski Stadium was rebranded as the Haygarth Lounge. He was capped once for England against Scotland at The Oval in 1875.

In the same year that he played football for England, Haygarth played first-class cricket for Hampshire against Sussex at Winchester. He later moved back to Cirencester, where he established a legal practice. He made two further first-class appearances for Gloucestershire in 1883, against Surrey and Yorkshire. He later lectured on agricultural law at the Royal Agricultural College. He later served as secretary of the college. Haygarth died in April 1915, at Siddington Manor in Siddington, Gloucestershire. Amongst members of his family, both his brother, John, and cousin, Arthur Haygarth, played first-class cricket.
