= Typee =

1846 book by Herman Melville

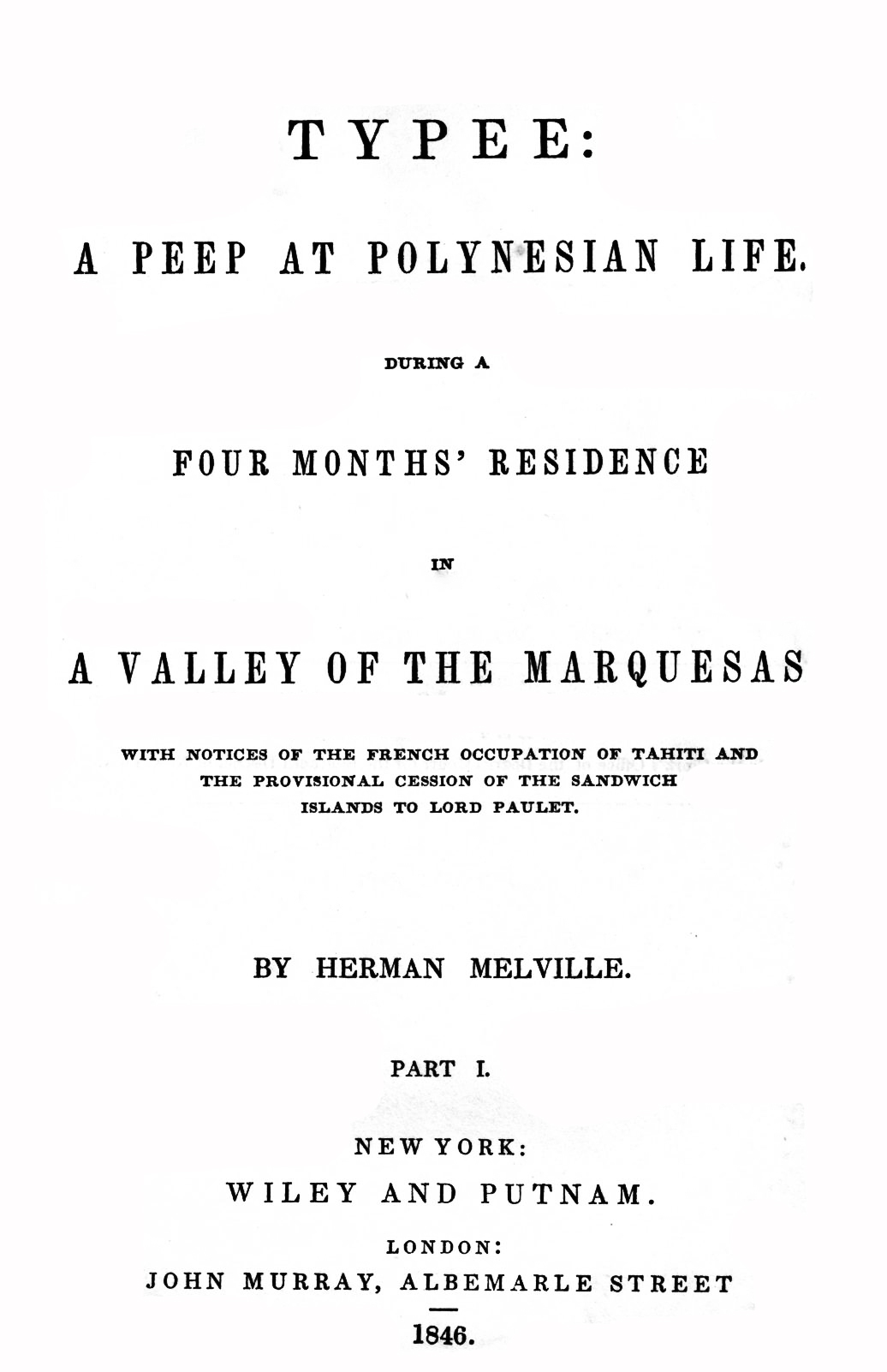
- First American edition title page
- Author: Herman Melville
- Language: English
- Genre: Travel literature
- Published: 1846 (New York: Wiley and Putnam); 1846 (London: John Murray)
- Publication place: United States, England
- Media type: Print
- Followed by: Omoo
- Text: Typee at Wikisource

Typee: A Peep at Polynesian Life is American writer Herman Melville's first book, published in 1846, when Melville was 26 years old. Considered a classic in travel and adventure literature, the narrative is based on Melville's experiences on the island Nuku Hiva in the South Pacific Marquesas Islands in 1842, supplemented with imaginative reconstruction and research from other books. The title comes from the valley of Taipivai, once known as Taipi.

Typee was Melville's most popular work during his lifetime; it made him notorious as the "man who lived among the cannibals".

== Background ==
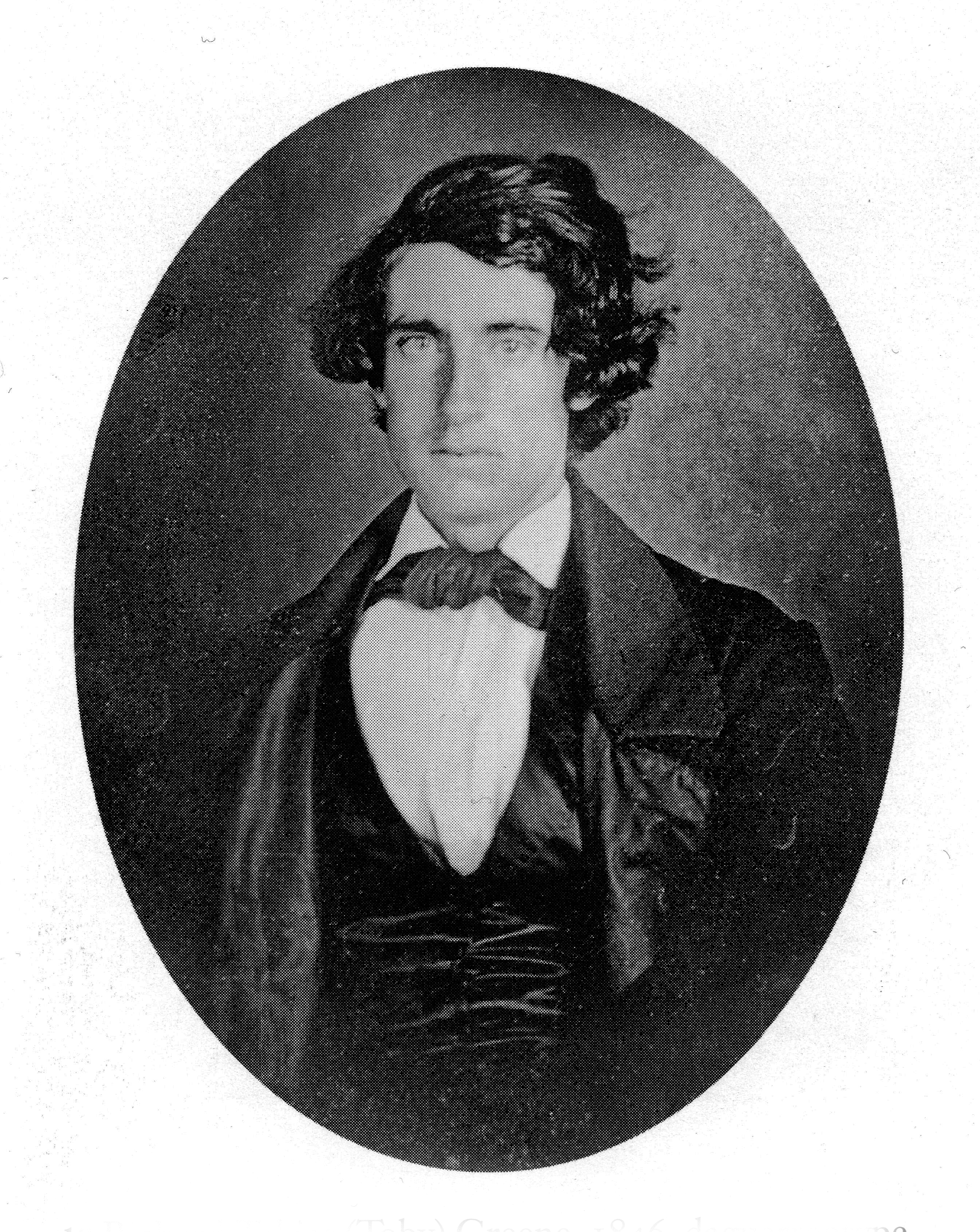
Richard Tobias (Toby) Greene in 1846

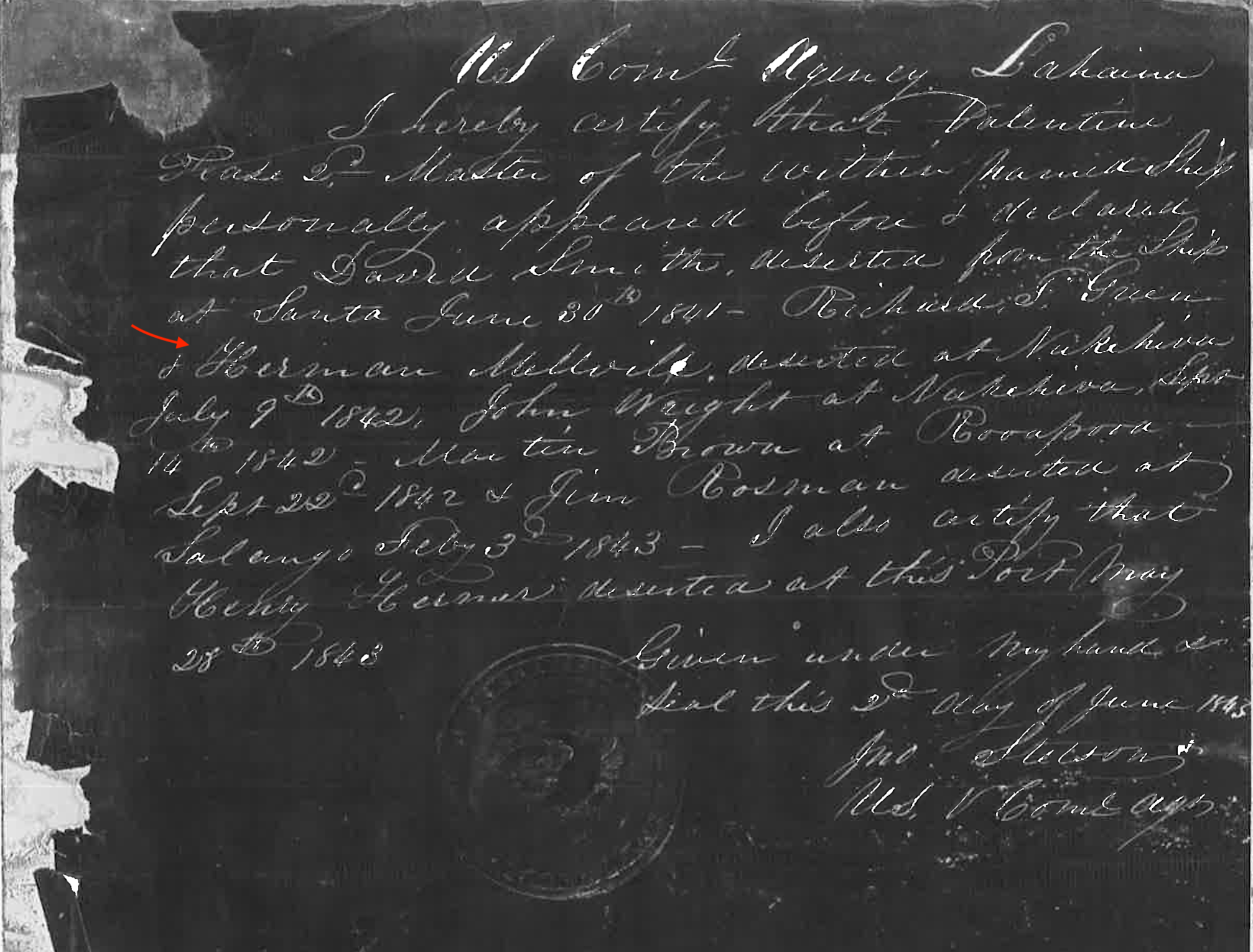
Melville's desertion from the Acushnet in 1842

From the beginning there were questions about Melville's romantic tale. The London publisher John Murray wanted reassurance that Melville's experiences were first-hand before he included the book in the Home and Colonial Library series, which was nonfiction by or about foreigners in exotic places. Warm but sometimes skeptical reviews also challenged Melville's account.

Not long after the book's publication, however, many of the events described were corroborated by Melville's fellow castaway, Richard Tobias Greene ("Toby"). Researchers later discovered an affidavit from the ship's captain that corroborated that Melville and Greene did indeed desert the ship on the island in the summer of 1842.

Typee can be seen as a kind of proto-anthropology. Melville continually admits vast ignorance of the culture and language he is describing while also trying to bolster and supplement his own experiences with wide reading and research. He also employs hyperbole and humor. Starting in the 1930s, scholars in the Melville revival questioned Melville's account. For instance, the length of stay on which Typee is based is presented as four months, and this was an exaggeration of Melville's actual stay on the island. There is also not a lake where Melville might have gone canoeing with Fayaway.

To flesh out his narrative, Melville used several source books from which he took passages and rewrote them. The most important of these source books are William Ellis, Polynesian Researches from 1833, George H. von Langsdorff, Voyages and Travels in Various Parts of the World from 1813, David Porter, Journal of a Cruise Made to the Pacific Ocean in the U.S. Frigate Essex from 1815, and Charles S. Stewart, A Visit to the South Seas in the U.S. ship Vincennes from 1831.

== Critical response ==
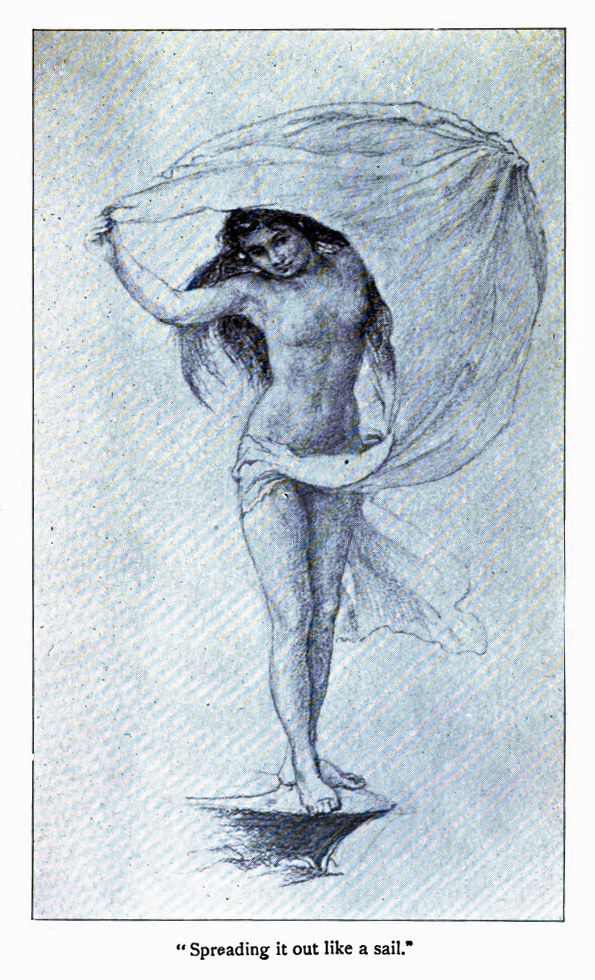
Fayaway

Typee's narrative expresses a great deal of sympathy for the so-called savages, and even interrogates the use of that word, while focusing the most criticism on European marauders and various missionaries' attempts to evangelize:

It may be asserted without fear of contradictions that in all the cases of outrages committed by Polynesians, Europeans have at some time or other been the aggressors, and that the cruel and bloodthirsty disposition of some of the islanders is mainly to be ascribed to the influence of such examples.

[The] voluptuous Indian, with every desire supplied, whom Providence has bountifully provided with all the sources of pure and natural enjoyment, and from whom are removed so many of the ills and pains of life—what has he to desire at the hands of Civilization? Will he be the happier? Let the once smiling and populous Hawaiian islands, with their now diseased, starving, and dying natives, answer the question. The missionaries may seek to disguise the matter as they will, but the facts are incontrovertible. ^{CH 4}

The Knickerbocker called Typee "a piece of Münchhausenism." New York publisher Evert Augustus Duyckinck wrote to Nathaniel Hawthorne that "it is a lively and pleasant book, not over philosophical perhaps." In 1939, Charles Robert Anderson published Melville in the South Seas, in which he elaborated on a number of Melville's likely sources in supplementing his work and also documented the existence of an affidavit from the captain of the Acushnet. If the date provided by the captain can be considered accurate, Anderson concludes that Melville's stay in the "Typee Valley" part of the island would have been merely "four weeks, or possible eight weeks at the most." However, in trying to determine the end date of Melville's stay, Anderson relies primarily on Melville's own internal accounts of various events, for instance that he was rescued from the valley on a "Monday." In summing up his view of Typee, Anderson writes:

For the general student of Melville, the detailed analysis and verification of these matters ... probably reveals an accuracy scarcely to be expected. Without hesitation it can be said that in general this volume presents a faithful delineation of the island life and scenery in precivilization Nukahiva, with the exception of numerous embellishments and some minor errors....

All of the initial back and forth that Melville experienced regarding the factuality of Typee may have had a chastening effect on him, as Anderson considers his next work, the book's sequel Omoo, "the most strictly autobiographical of all Melville's works." But this second book also seems to have met with some skepticism, so that for his third book Mardi, Melville declares in the preface that he has decided to write a work of fiction under the supposition (half-joking) he might finally be believed:

Not long ago, having published two narratives of voyages in the Pacific, which, in many quarters, were received with incredulity, the thought occurred to me, of indeed writing a romance of Polynesian adventure, and publishing it as such; to see whether, the fiction might not, possibly be received for a verity: in some degree the reverse of my previous experience.

== Academic analysis ==
Lawrence Buell suggested that Typee has interesting textual and metatextual elements implying that Melville was aiming for trans-Atlantic audiences. Buell specifically identifies Melville's portrayal of indigenous Polynesian religions as appealing on the one hand to assuage British concern for "veracity" in their reading and on the other skewering American "religious excess."

In the linguistics field, Typee is one of the few existing literature that shows examples of Maritime Polynesian Pidgin, a kind of zonal auxiliary language used by Euro-American sailors and whalers including of Melville's background in communicating with Polynesians and their very related, almost mutally intelligible languages following the first contact with James Cook in the late 1760s until later supplanted with European languages taught in colonial schools there.

== Publication history ==
Typee was published first in London by John Murray on February 26, 1846, and then in New York by Wiley and Putnam on March 17, 1846. It was Melville's first book, and made him one of the best-known American authors overnight.

The same version was published in London and New York in the first edition; however, Melville removed critical references to missionaries and Christianity from the second U.S. edition at the request of his American publisher. Later additions included a "Sequel: The Story of Toby" written by Melville, explaining what happened to Toby.

Before Typee's publication in New York, Wiley and Putnam asked Melville to remove one sentence. In a scene in Chapter Two where the Dolly is boarded by young women from Nukuheva, Melville originally wrote:

Our ship was now given up to every species of riot and debauchery. Not the feeblest barrier was interposed between the unholy passions of the crew and their unlimited gratification.

The second sentence was removed from the final version.

The discovery in 1983 of thirty more pages from Melville’s working draft manuscript led Melville scholar John Bryant to challenge earlier conclusions about Melville's writing habits. He describes the versions of the draft manuscript and of the “radically different physical print versions of the book,” which amount, Bryant concludes, to “one grand, hooded mess.” Since there is no clear way to present Melville’s "final intention," his 2008 book offers a “fluid text” that allows a reader to follow the revisions. made what he called “an exciting new perspective on Melville’s writing process and culture.”

The inaugural book of the Library of America series, titled Typee, Omoo, Mardi (May 6, 1982), was a volume containing Typee: A Peep at Polynesian Life, its sequel Omoo: A Narrative of Adventures in the South Seas (1847), and Mardi, and a Voyage Thither (1849).

== See also ==
- Last of the Pagans, a 1935 film adaptation of Typee
- Enchanted Island, a 1958 film adaptation of Typee. (An attempt by Allied Artists to film the novel was cancelled at a loss of $1.5 million.)

== Editions ==
- Melville, Herman (1968). Typee: A Peep at Polynesian Life. Vol. 1. Evanston, IL: Northwestern University Press. ISBN 9780810101593.
- ——— (1892). Typee: A Real Romance of the South Sea. Biographical and Critical Introduction by Arthur Stedman. Boston: Page. HathiTrust
- ——— (January 1996). Typee: A Peep at Polynesian Life During a Four Months' Residence in a Valley of the Marquesas. Introduction, Explanatory Commentary, and Appendices by John Bryant. New York: Penguin Books. ISBN 9780140434880.
- Bryant, John (2008). Melville Unfolding: Sexuality, Politics, and the Versions of Typee: A Fluid-Text Analysis, with an Edition of the Typee Manuscript. Ann Arbor: University of Michigan Press. ISBN 9780472115921. HathiTrust Open Access HERE.

== Bibliography ==
- Anderson, Charles Roberts (1939). Melville in the South Seas. Columbia University Press.
- Herbert, T. Walter (1980). Marquesan Encounters: Melville and the Meaning of Civilization. Cambridge, MA: Harvard University Press. ISBN 0674550668.
- Howard, Leon (1968), "Historical Note", in Melville, Herman (ed.), Typee: A Peep at Polynesian Life the Writings of Herman Melville Vol. 1, Evanston, IL: Northwestern University Press, pp. 277–302, ISBN 9780810101593
- Miller, Perry (1956). The Raven and the Whale: The War of Words and Wits in the Era of Poe and Melville. New York: Harvest.
- Nelson, Randy F. (1981). The Almanac of American Letters. Los Altos, California: William Kaufmann, Inc. ISBN 0-86576-008-X
- Stern, Milton R., ed. (1982). Critical Essays on Herman Melville's Typee. Boston, Mass: G.K. Hall. ISBN 0816184453..
- Tanselle, G. Thomas (1982). 'Notes.' In: Herman Melville, Typee, Omoo, Mardi. The Library of America, Vol. 1. ISBN 0940450003
- Widmer, Edward L. (1999). Young America: The Flowering of Democracy in New York City. New York: Oxford University Press. ISBN 0-19-514062-1..
