= Francis Gresson =

English cricketer

Francis Henry Gresson (18 February 1868 – 31 January 1949) was an English cricketer active from 1887 to 1901 who played for Oxford University and Sussex. He was born in Worthing and was educated at Winchester College and Oriel College, Oxford and died in Eastbourne. He appeared in 47 first-class matches as a lefthanded batsman who bowled left arm fast medium. He was a Cricket blue at Oxford between 1887 and 1889. His appearances with Sussex were limited by his job as a schoolmaster and he played no county cricket between 1890 and 1899. He scored 1,241 runs with a highest score of 114 and took 30 wickets with a best performance of five for 50.
