= Henry William Haygarth =

Henry William Haygarth (1821–1902) was an English cleric who as a young man lived for eight years in the Australian bush, writing a journal based on his experiences.

== Early life ==
He was the son of William Haygarth the poet and his wife Frances Parry; Arthur Haygarth the cricketer was his younger brother. He was educated at Eton College.

Haygarth travelled out from England in a family party led by a Parry cousin, David Parry-Okeden, sailing on the Eden, for New South Wales, His time in Australia was spent as a squatter, and he settled at a station 230 miles south-west of Sydney, then called Buckley's Crossing (now Dalgety). (Parry-Okeden and Hannibal Dutton of the party having gone ahead to the Snowy River-Gippsland area first, Haygarth may have initially spent time further north.)

== Later life ==
Haygarth then matriculated at Magdalen Hall, Oxford in 1847, at age 26. He graduated B.A. there in 1851, and M.A. at Exeter College in 1854. He was ordained in 1853, and was a curate for two years at Chigwell, followed by four years at Chingford. He became vicar of Wimbledon, Surrey in 1859, and was made an honorary canon of Rochester Cathedral in 1878. He was also Rural Dean of Barnes from 1871 to 1892. He died at the Vicarage, Wimbledon on 31 December 1902, aged 84.

== Works ==
Haygarth's Recollections of Bush Life in Australia was first published in 1848, and later reprinted. The book was part of the Home and Colonial Library. It has been seen as having an environmental dimension, relating to the settlement by whites of the Monaro region, and a political one, sympathetic to the Ngarigo people rather than the local administrator John Lambie.

== Family ==
On 12 March 1855 Haygarth married Emma Powell, daughter of John Harcourt Powell. They had a son Henry Evelyn (1860–1881).
