= Omoo =

1847 book by Herman Melville

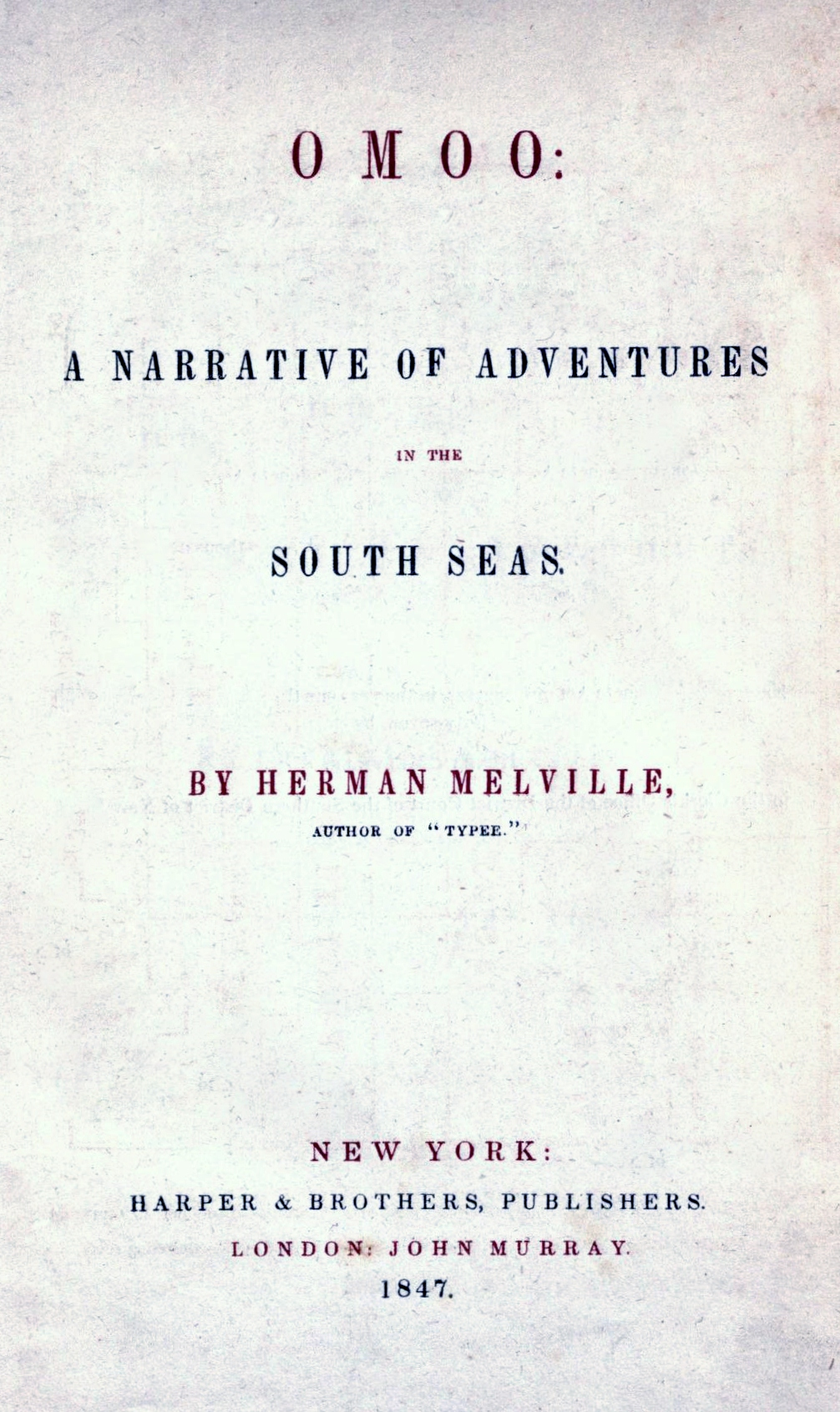
- First edition title page
- Author: Herman Melville
- Language: English
- Genre: Travel literature
- Published: 1847 (New York: Harper & Brothers); 1847 (London: John Murray)
- Publication place: United States, England
- Media type: Print
- Preceded by: Typee

Omoo: A Narrative of Adventures in the South Seas is the second book by American writer Herman Melville, first published in London in 1847, and a sequel to his first South Seas narrative Typee, also based on the author's experiences in the South Pacific. After leaving the island of Nuku Hiva, the main character ships aboard a whaling vessel that makes its way to Tahiti, after which there is a mutiny and a third of the crew are imprisoned on Tahiti. In 1949, the narrative was adapted into the exploitation film Omoo-Omoo, the Shark God.

== Background ==
The basis for the book are the author's experiences in the South Seas. According to scholars Harrison Hayford and Walter Blair, in August and September 1842, the Lucy Ann, an Australian whaleship, took Melville from the Marquesas Islands to Tahiti. There the crew revolted. After being imprisoned in the native jail, he strolled around the islands for some days, before embarking on another whaler for a voyage of six months.

In the Preface to Omoo, Melville claimed the book was autobiographical, written "from simple recollection" of some of his experiences in the Pacific in the 1840s and strengthened by his retelling the story many times before family and friends. But scholar Charles Roberts Anderson, working in the late 1930s, discovered that Melville had not simply relied on his memory and went on to reveal a wealth of other sources he drew on in writing the book.

Later, Melville scholar Harrison Hayford made a detailed study of these sources and, in the introduction to a 1969 edition of Omoo, summed up the author's practice, showing that this was a repetition of a process previously used in Typee:

"He had altered facts and dates, elaborated events, assimilated foreign materials, invented episodes, and dramatized the printed experiences of others as his own. He had not plagiarized, merely, for he had always rewritten and nearly always improved the passages he appropriated.....first writing out the narrative based on his recollections and invention, then using source books to pad out the chapters he had already written and to supply the stuff of new chapters that he inserted at various points in the manuscript."

To a greater extent than he did in Typee, Melville used several source books from which he took passages and rewrote them for his book. The most important of these source books are William Ellis, Polynesian Researches from 1833, George H. von Langsdorff, Voyages and Travels in Various Parts of the World from 1813, Charles S. Stewart, A Visit to the South Seas in the U.S. ship Vincennes from 1831, and Charles Wilkes, Narrative of the United States Exploring Expedition of 1845.

== Plot ==
In 1842, the narrator, having just escaped an "indulgent captivity" among the natives of Nuku Hiva, joins the crew of an Australian whaling ship from Sydney. He does not give his name, but one crew member calls him "Typee". Soon after coming aboard he meets and forms a friendship with the vessel's surgeon, a tall thin man known to his crew-mates as "Dr Long Ghost".

== Writing style ==
Compared to Typee, in Omoo a new style was emerging, of a "distinct and original signature," as critic Warner Berthoff describes it. Biographer Hershel Parker finds the narrator "powerfully attractive," because through the comical nature of the events "a new sensibility was emerging." Melville's "new command of language," as Parker calls this development, came with hints of what would be characteristic of his mature style in Moby-Dick and later books. These include the merging of images from various historical times and places. Essentially, an example of this can be found in chapter 27 of Omoo, where the narrator sees on a ship in the harbor of Tahiti the name of a town along the Hudson river: "In an instant, palm-trees and elms--canoes and skiffs--church spires and bamboos--all mingled in one vision of the present and the past."

Another emerging characteristic was the influence of Scripture on Melville's writing. A few examples suffice to illustrate this point: in chapter 2, the mate "abhorred all weak infusions, and cleaved manfully to strong drink" echoes Romans 12:9; "Woe be unto" him in chapter 14 repeats a biblical expression found in several places, for instance in Jeremiah 23:1; the character Kooloo in chapter 40 is "as sounding brass and a tinkling cynbal," which Melville took from 1 Corinthians 13:1.

== Publication history ==
On December 18, 1846, Melville signed a contract with Harper Brothers for the publication of Omoo, and on December 30, he offered the book to John Murray, the British publisher of Typee. Some day in January publisher Evert Duyckinck asked Melville for permission to publish some pages of Omoo in the new magazine Literary World, and on January 30 the title was registered in the Office of the District Court for the Southern District of New York.

On February 1 proof sheets of the American edition were sent to London, where the customs house in Liverpool initially seized them as a piracy. The sheets were released and on February 26 Murray proposed to pay £150 for the copyright of the book, £50 more than he had offered for the previous book Melville accepted this offer in a letter of March 31, explaining that "he did not know how to determine the 'precise pecuniary value' of an unpublished work."

March 27 was the official date of the British publication. 4,000 copies of Omoo were printed, 2,500 paperbound copies in two parts, each priced at half a crown, and the rest as a single hardbound volume, priced at six shillings. At the request of the author, a map was engraved, as well as a Round-Robin diagram.

Murray included both Typee and Omoo in his Home and Colonial Library which was marketed and sold as a collection throughout the British Empire. In it, Melville was listed together with other well-known writers, an event that turned out to be an important watershed for both his sales and reputation. "Over the decades Melville's presence in the library insured the fame of his first two books with two or three generations of English readers all around the world."

In the United States, the book was available on May 1, in the same formats as Murray issued them. The two paperbound volumes were priced at 50¢ each, and the single volume in a cloth casing cost $1.25. 5,500 copies were printed by July, 2,000 of which in paper, 1,800 in muslin, and the rest remained in sheets.

Variants in spelling and punctuation aside, the two editions differed at 79 points, most of which were single words.
