= Tuareg (disambiguation) =

The Tuareg people are nomads of the Sahara.

Tuareg may also refer to:

- Tuareg languages
- Tuareg rebellion (disambiguation)
- Tuareg Shield, an area lying between the West African craton and the Saharan Metacraton in West Africa
- Tuareg Sloughi, an African dog breed
- Touareg tea, a kind of flavoured tea prepared in northern Africa and in Arabian countries
- Tuareg – The Desert Warrior, a 1984 adventure film starring Mark Harmon
- Volkswagen Touareg, the second sport-utility vehicle manufactured by Volkswagen
- Tuareg (novel), a 1980 novel by Alberto Vázquez-Figueroa
