= Patrick Watkins =

Patrick or Pat Watkins may refer to:

- Patrick Watkins (sailor), Irish sailor, first resident of the Galapagos Islands
- Pat Watkins (baseball) (born 1972), American baseball player
- Pat Watkins (born 1982), Canadian football player
