= Iguana (film) =

- DVD cover
- Directed by: Monte Hellman
- Written by: Steven Gaydos; Monte Hellman; David M. Zehr
- Based on: Iguana by Alberto Vázquez-Figueroa
- Produced by: Franco Di Nunzio
- Starring: Everett McGill; Maru Valdivielso; Michael Madsen; Joseph Culp; Tim Ryan; Augustín Guevara
- Cinematography: Josep M. Civit
- Edited by: Monte Hellman
- Music by: Franco Campanino
- Production company: Arco Films / Iguana Enterprises
- Release date: April 1, 1988
- Running time: 88 minutes
- Countries: Italy; Spain; Switzerland; United States
- Language: English
- Budget: ~$3,000,000

Iguana is a 1988 American adventure crime film directed by Monte Hellman and starring Everett McGill in the main role. It is based on the novel by Spanish author Alberto Vázquez-Figueroa, itself based on the life of a real Irish sailor called Patrick Watkins. The film was mainly shot on location in Lanzarote. Monte Hellman won Bastone Bianco Award (Special Mention) for this movie on the Venice Film Festival in 1988. Iguana premiered in theaters on April 1, 1988, and was released on DVD on January 30, 2001, via Anchor Bay Entertainment. The film ends with the titles "For Warren" as Hellman dedicated the film to his friend Warren Oates.

== Plot ==
The film takes place at the beginning of the 19th century. Oberlus (Everett McGill), a harpooner on a whaling ship, is regularly subjected to ridicule and abuse by other sailors. The right half of his face is bizarrely disfigured and covered with hummocky outgrowths, which leads him to being nicknamed Iguana. One night, after a brutal beating, Oberlus escapes to the uninhabited Hood Island. He is soon discovered by a team led by captain Gamboa (Fabio Testi). Gamboa brutally tortures Oberlus and ties him up for further punishment, but Iguana manages to escape and hides himself in a cave. The ship leaves the island and Gamboa orders that sailor Sebastian (Michael Madsen) be tied to a post on the coast as punishment for letting Iguana escape. Oberlus finds Sebastian and proclaims himself "King of Hood Island" and Sebastian his first slave, forcing him to cook his food.

Declaring revenge upon the world, Oberlus enslaves two other sailors thrown ashore after the shipwreck. He keeps his captives in a cave with a disguised entrance. After some time, a ship holding Carmen (Maru Valdivieso) and her fiancé Diego (Fernando De Huang), is moored near the island. Oberlus takes them prisoner. Oberlus kills Diego and makes Carmen his concubine. The captain of the ship, assuming Carmen and Diego to have died in the storm, does not look for them, but sails away.

One day, Oberlus notices the arrival of his former whaling ship. At night, he climbs on board, kills two sailors on the deck, takes Gamboa prisoner, and sets the ship alight, having previously locked the hull. Gamboa fights Oberlus, but is killed by him.

Resigned to her fate, Carmen tells Oberlus that she is pregnant with his child. Months later, the captain of the ship Carmen and Diego arrived on, returns with a group of armed sailors. They begin their search and Oberlus has to flee to the other end of the island with pregnant Carmen and his surviving prisoners. Oberlus plans to sail away with Carmen on the boat. Carmen gives birth, but Oberlus takes the child, saying that he will not allow him to suffer as he did, implying that the child is disfigured as he is. With the child in his arms, he enters the sea, intending to drown himself and the child.

== Cast ==
- Everett McGill as "Iguana" Oberlus
- Fabio Testi as Gamboa
- Michael Madsen as Sebastián
- Roger Kendall as Roger
- Robert Case as One Eyed Sailor
- Maru Valdivielso as Carmen (Maru Valdivieso)
- Fernando De Huang as Diego
- Fernando Cebrián as Ibarra
- Joseph Culp as Dominic
- Tim Ryan as George
- Augustín Guevara as Knut

== Production ==
=== Development ===
The film was based on Alberto Vázquez-Figueroa's novel. It was partially based upon the Irish sailor Patrick Watkins, also known as Oberlus. Watkins, in 1807, spent two years in one of the islands of the Galapagos archipelago during which he captured and enslaved other sailors. In the literature, the life of Oberlus was initially described in sufficient detail in The Encantadas by the American writer Herman Melville. An essay on the tyrant-hermit Oberlus inspired the Spanish writer Alberto Vázquez-Figueroa to write the novel "La iguana". In the novel, there appears Carmen, whom Oberlus keeps locked up, raping and making her bear his child. Vázquez-Figueroa initially discussed a potential adaptation with Italian film producer Franco di Nunzio, who sent him to Monte Hellman. The original script consisted of numerous long monologues, as it was arranged in the form of Carmen's letters to his mother. This option did not suit Monte Hellman, and he agreed to become a director only if the script was completely rewritten. The film would mark writer/director Hellman's return to directing since China 9, Liberty 37 (1978).

=== Filming ===
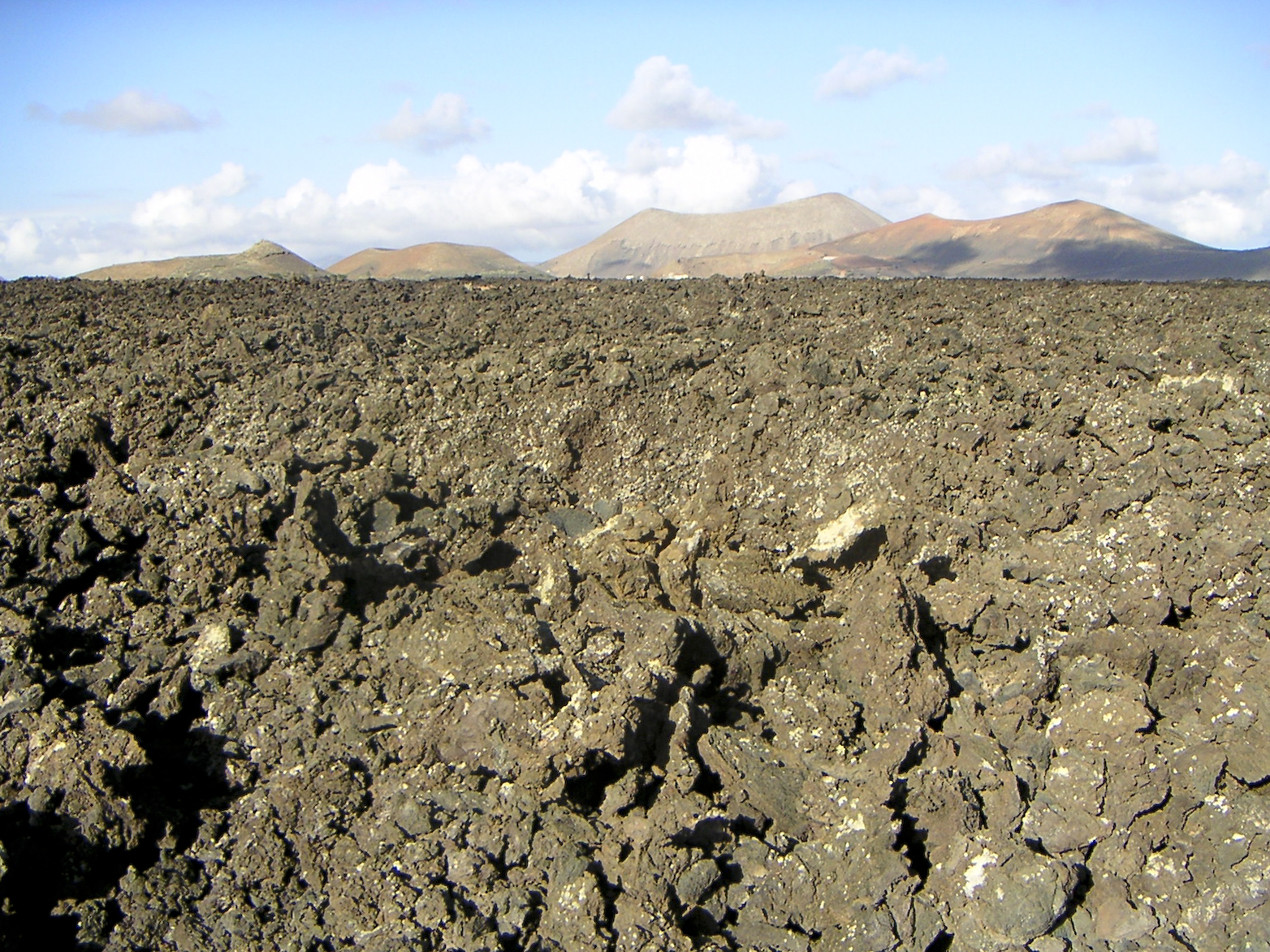
The lava field of the island of Lanzarote

Most of the material was filmed in Lanzarote, one of the Canary Islands. It was chosen because of its vast tracts of land covered with basalt and volcanic ash, which are similar to the Hood Island, where the action of the film takes place. All cave scenes were filmed in Rome.

According to the memoirs of Monte Hellman, Franco di Nunzio's extreme penny pinching caused the film's shooting period to extend from six to nine weeks, due to constant delays in the delivery of props and equipment; the first three weeks of shooting had to go without lighting equipment.

== Music ==
Because of legal difficulties associated with the joint production of the film, Franco Campanino was credited as a composer. In fact, the authorship belongs to Joni Mitchell, Amaya Merino, and Joseph Culp.

== Release ==
Iguana premiered in 1988 at the Venice Film Festival, where director Monte Hellman received a special film critics prize "Bastone Bianco Award". Later, Franco di Nunzio insisted that the film be shortened by eight minutes. Monte Hellman wrote in his memoirs that "the producer became obsessed with the idea that the movie should be no longer than 90 minutes. He didn't speak English, and never understood a word of the film. He made cuts that destroyed the rhythm and logic of the film, and made it incomprehensible, as well as seemingly longer."

As a result, none of the versions appeared in the wide release; for a long time the producer refused to sell the film as he was not satisfied with the price offered by distributors. In the US, the film was available only on VHS until 2001 when Anchor Bay Entertainment released the 98-minute version on DVD with a two-minute fragment being omitted, namely, the scene in which Diego wakes up and disappears in the dark corner of the cave.

== Reception ==
Iguana was not widely reviewed by mainstream critics upon its release. Reviews that exist on the film have been mostly positive.

Mark Zimmer from Digitally Obsessed awarded it a grade B+, commending the film's performances, cinematography, and mood. Zimmer summarized his review by calling it "An aggressively politically incorrect and highly disturbing film". Jake Cole from Slant Magazine gave the film 3.5 out of 5 stars, praising the film for its acting, cinematography, characterizations, and "abstract" editing. Concluding his review, Cole called it an unjustly forgotten gem of 1980s cinema and "an interpretive horror film".

The film was not without its detractors. Dennis Schwartz from Ozus' World Movie Reviews rated the film a grade C+, calling it "Interesting only for its mythical pretensions."

American writer and critic Nick Newman placed Iguana on his 2022 Sight and Sound list of the greatest films ever made, saying "Shakespeare originated this story in The Tempest; Monte Hellman improved it."

== Bibliography ==
- Albright, Brian (January 27, 2015). Wild Beyond Belief!: Interviews with Exploitation Filmmakers of the 1960s and 1970s. McFarland. ISBN 978-0-7864-8250-4.
- Roberts, Jerry; Gaydos, Steven (January 1995). Movie Talk from the Front Lines: Filmmakers Discuss Their Works with the Los Angeles Film Critics Association. McFarland & Company. ISBN 978-0-7864-0005-8.
- Stevens, Brad (2003). Monte Hellman: His Life and Films. McFarland & Company. ISBN 978-0-7864-1434-5.
