= Benito Cereno =

1856 novella by Herman Melville

- Short story by Herman Melville
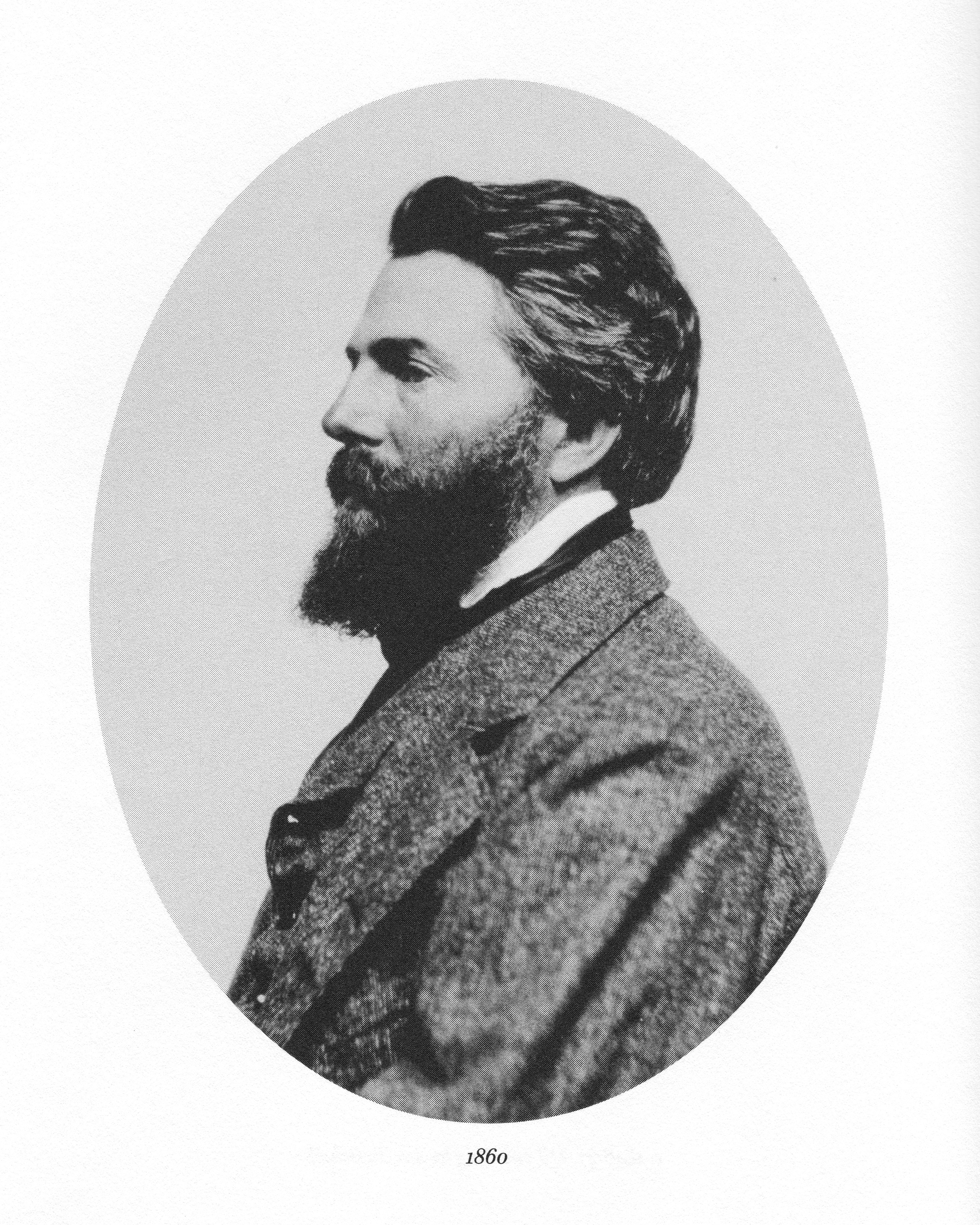
- Herman Melville in 1860, five years after the writing of "Benito Cereno".
- Country: United States
- Language: English
- Genre: Sea Adventure

Publication
- Published in: Putnam's Monthly Magazine, The Piazza Tales
- Publication type: magazine serialization, part of book
- Publisher: Dix & Edwards
- Publication date: October, November, December 1855 (serialization), May 1856 (American book), June 1856 (British book)

Benito Cereno is a novella by Herman Melville, a fictionalized account about the revolt on a Spanish slave ship captained by Don Benito Cereno, first published in three installments in Putnam's Monthly in 1855. The tale, slightly revised, was included in his short story collection The Piazza Tales that appeared in May 1856. According to scholar Merton M. Sealts Jr., the story is "an oblique comment on those prevailing attitudes toward blacks and slavery in the United States that would ultimately precipitate civil war between North and South". Over time, Melville's story has been "increasingly recognized as among his greatest achievements".

In 1799 off the coast of Chile, captain Amasa Delano of the American sealer and merchant ship Bachelor's Delight visits the San Dominick, a Spanish slave ship apparently in distress. After learning from its captain Benito Cereno that a storm has taken many crewmembers and provisions, Delano offers to assist. He notices that Cereno is awkwardly passive for a captain and the slaves display remarkably inappropriate behavior, and though this piques his suspicion he ultimately decides he is being paranoid. When he leaves the San Dominick and captain Cereno jumps after him, he finally discovers that the slaves have revolted and forced the surviving crew to maintain a false narrative. Employing a third-person narrator who reports Delano's point of view without any correction, the story has become a famous example of unreliable narration.

Much critical study has gone into the story's relation to the Toussaint Louverture-led slave rebellion of the 1790s in Saint-Domingue, as well as to Melville's use of one chapter from the historical Amasa Delano's Voyages of 1817, a source of such importance that "he must have written 'Benito Cereno' with Chapter 18 constantly open before him." The novella's "unreliable, even deceptive, narration" continues to cause misunderstanding. Many reviewers of The Piazza Tales cited the novella as one of the highlights in the collection. Melville biographer Hershel Parker calls it "an intensely controlled work, formally one of the most nearly perfect things Melville ever did."

== Plot summary ==
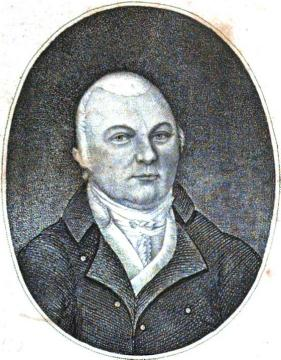
Amasa Delano's portrait. Frontispice from his A Narrative of Voyages, 1817.

In 1799, the captain of a sealing ship Bachelor’s Delight, Captain Amasa Delano from Duxbury, Massachusetts, spots another ship drifting towards the bay of Santa Maria. Wondering if the ship is in distress, Delano boards his whale-boat and sets sail towards the suspicious ship. He learns that the ship is called the San Dominick, captained by Don Benito Cereno. Upon arrival, Delano is greeted by Spaniards and black men and women who beg him for water and supplies. Delano is troubled by the number of black people on board since they greatly outnumber the Spaniards. This disparity is explained by the collective cries of those on-board, claiming that they had been hit by a fever that killed more of the Spaniard crew than of the slaves. Assuming the standard roles of the races, Delano ignores many troubling signs.

The ship is actually filled with rebel slaves who killed their owner, Alexandro Aranda, and are in control of the Spaniards and Captain Benito. Captain Benito is constantly served by Babo, the leader of the rebellion, and Delano does not suspect anything despite the fact that Benito is never left alone. Under Babo's control, Cereno claims he headed toward the Bolivian coast in order to acquire more hands on deck. Due to all of the aforementioned conditions, the ship has doubled its path several times. When Delano asks about the slaves' master, Alexandro Aranda, Benito states that he took fever aboard the ship and died.

Delano is disturbed by the incidents he observes, such as when a black boy slashes the head of a white boy with a knife. Surprisingly, Cereno does not acknowledge or even seem to care about this behavior. The whispered conversations between Cereno and Babo make Delano feel uncomfortable. Gradually, his suspicions increase as he notes Cereno's sudden waves of dizziness and anxiety, the crew's awkward movements and hushed talks, and the unusual interaction of the slaves and the crew. Yet Delano answers Cereno’s questions about the crew, cargo, and arms aboard the Bachelor’s Delight without reserve, reasoning that the innocent are protected by the truth. When the dinghy arrives with supplies, Delano sends the dinghy back for more water while he continues to observe curious incidents.

Babo reminds Cereno that it is time for his shave and suggests that Delano join them. Their suspicious behavior continues when Babo searches "for the sharpest" razor and Cereno "nervously shuddered" at the "sight of gleaming steel." Just when Delano asks Cereno how he spent over two months crossing a distance Delano himself would have sailed within a few days, Babo nicks Cereno's neck and draws blood. It is unclear whether the nick is caused by a sudden wave on the sea, or "a momentary unsteadiness of the servant’s hand." Delano feels that slavery fosters ugly passions and invites Cereno for coffee aboard the Bachelor’s Delight. Cereno declines the offer, offending Delano, who is increasingly irritated by the lack of opportunity to have a private conversation without Babo within hearing distance.

When the American steps into the dinghy and takes off, Don Benito jumps into the boat, falling at the feet of Captain Delano. Three Spanish sailors dive after him along with Babo, who is holding a dagger. Delano fears Babo wants to attack him, but he loses the dagger when he falls into the boat. With a second dagger, Babo attempts to stab Don Benito. Delano’s men prevent him from achieving his purpose. Delano finally realizes that a slave revolt has been going on aboard the San Dominick. The remaining sailors taking flight into the masts to escape the blacks who are after them. The canvas falls off the ship's figurehead, revealing the strung-up skeleton of Alexandro Aranda. Delano secures Babo; Delano's men attack the Spanish ship to claim booty by defeating the revolting slaves.

Eventually, legal depositions taken at Lima explain the matter. Instead of storm and epidemics, a bloody slave revolt under Babo’s command caused the mortalities among the crew, including Aranda. As Delano approached, the revolting slaves set up the illusion that the surviving whites are still in charge. Delano asks the sad Benito: "’you are saved; what has cast such a shadow upon you?'" To which Cereno replies: "The negro."

Some months after the trial, Babo is executed never having said a word to defend himself. His body is burned but his head is fixed on a pole in the Plaza. Babo's head looks in the direction of St. Bartholomew’s church, where "the recovered bones of Aranda" lay, and further across the bridge "towards the monastery on Mount Agonia without: where, three months after being dismissed by the court, Benito Cereno, borne on the bier, did, indeed, follow his leader."

== Background ==
In the 1850s, a revolt on a slave ship was not a far-fetched topic for a literary work. The historian Greg Grandin explores the historical background of the novel and relates it to the larger questions of slavery and empire in American history. In 1839, the Spanish schooner La Amistad with fifty slaves became the site of slave revolt between two Cuban ports, and two crew members were killed. An American naval vessel seized the Amistad when the ship had wandered off course near Long Island. Then followed a legal battle which went all the way to the U.S. Supreme Court, where John Quincy Adams succeeded in setting the slaves free in the 1841 U.S. Supreme Court ruling United States v. The Amistad. In 1841 the American Creole moved slaves from Virginia to New Orleans when nineteen slaves killed a white sailor and took command of the ship, which then set sail to the British Bahamas. In the Creole case, the slaves were set free under the 1833 British Act of Emancipation. Madison Washington, the leader of the revolt, became the hero of a novel a decade later, in March 1853, when Frederick Douglass published the short novel The Heroic Slave in his anti-slavery newspaper North Star.

== Composition ==
Melville's main source for the novella was the 1817 memoir of Captain Amasa Delano, A Narrative of Voyages and Travels, in the Northern and Southern Hemispheres: Comprising Three Voyages Round the World; Together with a Voyage of Survey and Discovery, in the Pacific Ocean and Oriental Islands. Through this memoir, Delano recounts what happens after his vessel, the Perseverance, encounters the Spanish slave ship, the Tryal, on February 20, 1805, in a deserted bay at the island of Santa Maria. Delano's account of this encounter follows his thoughts and actions before, during, and after he realizes that the Tryal has been overtaken by the slaves aboard, thus allowing Melville to build his narrative for Benito Cereno.

We pulled as fast as we could on board; and then despatched the boat for the man who was left in the water, whom we succeeded to save alive.

We soon had our guns ready; but the Spanish ship had dropped so far astern of the Perseverance, that we could bring but one gun to bear on her, which was the after one. This was fired six times, without any other effect than cutting away the fore top-mast stay, and some other small ropes which were no hindrance to her going away. She was soon out of reach of our shot, steering out of the bay. We then had some other calculations to make.

— Amasa Delano, A Narrative of Voyages and Travels, 1817, Chapter 18, 325.

Harold H. Scudder, who discovered the link between 'Benito Cereno' and Delano's A Narrative of Voyages and Travels, in the Northern and Southern Hemispheres, writes that Melville "found his story ready made. He merely rewrote this Chapter including a portion of the legal documents there appended, suppressing a few items, and making some small additions." Besides changing the date to 1799, Melville made three more notable additions:

First, while Delano does not describe the Spanish ship, Melville provides a description of a "Spanish merchantman of the first class," that had seen better days: "The tops were large, and were railed about with what had once been octagonal net-work, all now in sad disrepair... Battered and mouldy, the castellated forecastle seemed some ancient turrot, long ago taken by assault, and then left to decay."

Second, Melville replaces the names Perseverance and Tryal by names of his own literary invention, Bachelor's Delight and San Dominick, (Note: And of his apparent error as well: the correct Spanish name for this Spanish vessel would have been "'Santo Domingo'" (Hayford, MacDougall, and Tanselle 1987, 583).) respectively.

Third, while the real Delano was accompanied by his midshipman Luther, Melville's Delano visits the Spanish ship alone. Melville introduces incidents of his own invention, chief among them the shaving of Don Benito, the giant Atufal in chains, and the lunch aboard the Spanish ship. Though the names of the captains remain unchanged, Melville changes the name of the confidential servant from Muri to Babo.

Other additions include the two slaves attacking the Spanish seaman, the glimpse of the jewel, and the sailor presenting the Gordian knot. Melville elaborates on Cereno's leap into Delano's boat after Babo's attempt to stab Cereno as well as the revelation of the skeleton-shaped figurehead. Final inventions are Cereno's deposition at the beginning and his death in a monastery.

Scholar Rosalie Feltenstein finds it "far from accurate" to say that he found his story ready-made in his source, a statement not just contradicted by Scudder's own inventory of alterations, but instead of suppressing only "a few items," Melville in fact "omits the whole second half of the narrative." Melville meant to both elevate the Cereno character, making him "as heartless and savage as the slaves," and to turn Babo into "a manifestation of pure evil." For instance, in the source Cereno himself tries to stab one of the slaves with a hidden dirk: "Transferred entirely to Babo, this action provides the crisis of the story and adds a final touch to the portrait of the slave's malignity." Some of the "apparently trifling alterations" of his source can be explained by the artistic purpose of establishing a web of imagery pertaining to monks and monasteries.

The boat was immediately dispatched back to pick up the three swimming sailors. Meantime, the guns were in readiness, though, owing to the San Dominick having glided somewhat astern of the sealer, only the aftermost could be brought to bear. With this, they fired six times; thinking to cripple the fugitive ship by bringing down her spars. But only a few inconsiderable ropes were shot away. Soon the ship was beyond the guns' range, steering broad out of the bay; the blacks thickly clustering round the bowsprit, one moment with taunting cries towards the whites, the next with upthrown gestures hailing the now dusky moors of ocean--cawing crows escaped from the hand of the fowler.

— Melville's "Benito Cereno".

Andrew Delbanco points out Melville's elaboration of the episode in which Delano is struck by the scarcity of whites aboard when he first enters the San Dominick. The real Delano describes this in one phrase ("captain, mate, people and slaves, crowded around me to relate their stories"), but Melville expands the scene to one full paragraph.

According to Melville scholar Harrison Hayford, "the island of Santa Maria is relocated from the coast of central Chile near Concepcion to 'down towards its southern extremity,'...the time span lengthened considerably, the legal deposition abridged and altered, the number of blacks multiplied, and names and roles are switched." One such switch is the replacement of Muri's name by his father's, Babo. Melville's Babo is a blend of the central roles that Babo and his father Muri play in the source. In their reproduction of Amasa Delano's chapter, the editors of the 1987 edition supply marginal page and line numbers indicating parallel passages in Melville's novella. (Compare quoteboxes to see one example of such parallels.)

Biographer Parker concludes the legal documents section is roughly half Melville's own invention fused with slightly adapted documents copied from Delano. Melville's additions include cannibalism and the image of Columbus. Generally, his inventions are "not distinguishable without collation of the real depositions against Melville's deposition, for the Delano chapter provided dazzlingly evocative material to work from." Another important distinction between Melville's account and A Narrative of Voyages and Travels to note is the death of two central characters in Melville's story, Babo and Atufal.

Historian Sterling Stuckey finds it unjust to restrict attention to chapter 18, because Melville used elements from other chapters as well. He also names sources for the presence of Ashantee culture in the novella.

== Writing style ==
=== Point of view ===
"Benito Cereno" is narrated from a third person point of view that is limited to the perspective of Captain Amasa Delano, an American sailor from Massachusetts.

Delano’s experience aboard the San Dominick is depicted through his inaccurate perceptions of the racial dynamics on board the ship. He assumes that the blacks are under the dominion of Benito Cereno; in reality, they have revolted, forcing the Spanish sailors to perform for Delano as if the ship’s crew was culled by a pestilent sickness. Andrew Delbanco observes the subtlety of Melville's handling of perspective, writing that Melville "moves us so close to Delano's perspective that we witness the scene as if over his shoulder and hear the 'clamorous' crowd as if through his ears."

Throughout the majority of the novella, the crucial information that the self-liberated blacks have murdered all of the Spanish officers on board, excepting Benito Cereno, is withheld from the reader. This disruption of the ship’s status quo is repeatedly foreshadowed by Delano’s misperceptions about Benito Cereno and Babo's unusual relationship. During his visit aboard the slave carrier, Hershel Parker observes that Delano "repeats a pattern of suspicions-followed-by-reassurance, with progressively shorter periods in which suspicions can be allayed." He describes Melville's Delano as "bluffly good-natured, practical, and resourceful but intellectually obtuse, naively optimistic, impervious to evil."

With regard to Melville's choice to implement a third-person narration, John Bryant believes that no first-person narrator was used because it would have made the suspense hard to sustain, as first-person narrators "too easily announce their limitations." Melville "adopts the voice of an omniscient and supposedly objective speaker, but limits his reporting almost exclusively to Delano's skewed point of view." The narrator only reports what Delano sees and thinks, "[making] no judgments and [relating] Delano's fatally racist presumptions as fact." Melville's limited narrator deceives the white readership of Putnam's Monthly "into adopting Delano's erroneous thinking." At the time of publishing, the denouement most likely came as no less shocking to the reader than to Delano himself, and "the story's final effect is to force readers to retrace their own racism to discover how, as a condition of mind, it distorts our vision." Laurie Robertson-Lorant astutely verbalizes this parallel between Delano's viewpoint and the reader's position, writing, "Babo has woven an elaborate web of deception from the American's own prejudices," and "Melville has drawn readers who adopt Delano's view of the San Dominick into the same entangling web."

=== Prose rhythm: tension vs. relief, narrative style versus legal documents ===
Several critics have noticed the fundamental rhythm of the story, a rhythm of tension and relief characteristic of the sentences, Captain Delano's state of mind, and even of the structure of the novella as a whole.

Every so often, Delano notices an unusual hissing whisper or silent hand signal "might cut through Delano's haze and awaken him to the true situation, but he always reverts to 'tranquillizing' thoughts" about the white man's power and the black man's "natural servility". Unconsciously, Delano lets himself be distracted from pursuing his apprehensions. Delbanco concludes his description of the shaving scene (see below) with an assessment of what he sees as the purpose of the rhythm: "This pattern of tension followed by release gives Benito Cereno its teasing rhythm of flow-and-ebb, which, since the release is never complete, has the incremental effect of building pressure toward the bursting point."

The prolonged riddle of the main story is solved with the leap of Don Benito into Delano's boat—an ending of just a page and a half. This event is related a second time, now in "the cumbersome style of a judicial exposition" for which the documents in the source provided the model. For Berthoff, the presence of these documents represent "only the most abrupt of a series of shifts and starts in the presentation" that constitute the narrative rhythm of "tension increasing and diminishing" and of "the nervous succession of antithetical feelings and intuitions." Berthoff recognizes the sentences perform the double function of simultaneously showing and suspending, remarking, "They must communicate tension but also damp it down." Though the paragraphs are usually short, the longer ones contain what, for Berthoff, is the essential rhythm of the tale:

As his foot pressed the half-damp, half-dry seamosses matting the place, and a chance phantom cats-paw--an islet of breeze, unheralded, unfollowed--as this ghostly cats-paw came fanning his cheek; as his glance fell upon the row of small, round dead-lights--all closed like coppered eyes of the coffined--and the state-cabin door, once connecting with the gallery, even as the dead-lights had once looked out upon it, but now calked fast like a sarcophagus lid; and to a purple-black, tarred-over panel, threshold, and post; and he bethought him of the time, when that state-cabin and this state-balcony had heard the voices of the Spanish king's officers, and the forms of the Lima viceroy's daughters had perhaps leaned where he stood--as these and other images flitted through his mind, as the cats-paw through the calm, gradually he felt rising a dreamy inquietude, like that of one who alone on the prairie feels unrest from the repose of the moon.

Besides the role of Melville's descriptive powers in carrying the suspension in this sentence, "the rhythm of sensation and response it reproduces" is "in miniature" the rhythm of both the action and the telling.

After the presentation of the legal documents, the novella concludes in a style of "spare, rapid, matter-of-fact statement into longer paragraphs and a more sustained and concentrated emphasis:"

As for the black--whose brain, not body, had schemed and led the revolt, with the plot--his slight frame, inadequate to that which it held, had at once yielded to the superior muscular strength of his captor, in the boat. Seeing all was over, he uttered no sound, and could not be forced to. His aspect seemed to say, since I cannot do deeds, I will not speak words. Put in irons in the hold, he was carried to Lima. During the passage, Don Benito did not visit him. Nor then, nor at any time after, would he look at him. Before the tribunal he refused. When pressed by the judges, he fainted. On the testimony of the sailors alone rested the legal identity of Babo.
Some months after, dragged to the gibbet at the tail of a mule, the black met his voiceless end. The body was burned to ashes; but for many days, the head, that hive of subtlety, fixed on a pole in the Plaza, met, unabashed, the gaze of the whites; and across the Plaza looked towards St. Bartholomew's church, in whose vaults slept then, as now, the recovered bones of Aranda: and across the Rimac bridge looked towards the monastery, on Mount Agonia without; where, three months after being dismissed by the court, Benito Cereno, borne on the bier, did, indeed, follow his leader.

These last paragraphs introduce a new tone, after the "teasing oscillations of mood" in the first part and the "dry repetitions of the court documents," the novella's conclusion is "terse, rapid, taut with detail," and for Berthoff an admirable example of "Melville's ordinary boldness in fitting his performance to the whole developing occasion."

=== Imagery ===
As Rosalie Feltenstein first noticed, the Spanish ship and its crew are described continuously in "similes drawn from monastic life." At first sighting, the ship is likened to a "white-washed monastery after a thunderstorm." Delano first mistakes the crew for monks, "Black Friars pacing the cloisters." Ironically, the ragged Babo looked "something like a begging friar of Saint Francis." Even the name of the ship, San Dominick, (Note: Feltenstein's (1947, 249) claim that the name of Delano's own ship, Bachelor's Delight, is a combination of the name of two ships met by the Pequod in Moby-Dick, seems founded upon pure coincidence: the name was "borrowed from the ship navigated by William Cowley" (Hayford, MacDougall, and Tanselle 1987, 584).) is relevant here, the Dominicans being known as "the Black Friars." The name of the ship is not only appropriate for the African slaves, but also "hints of the blackness with which the story is filled."

== Themes and motifs ==
=== Slavery and racism ===
Because of its ambiguity, the novella has been read by some as racist and pro-slavery and by others as anti-racist and abolitionist. However, by the mid-20th century, at least some critics read Benito Cereno as a tale that primarily explores human depravity and does not reflect upon race at all. Feltenstein sees "a trace of nineteenth-century satanism in Babo," and asserts that "Slavery is not the issue here; the focus is upon evil in action in a certain situation."

Since the 1940s, criticism has moved to reading Babo as the heroic leader of a slave rebellion whose tragic failure does not diminish the genius of the rebels. In an inversion of contemporary racial stereotypes, Babo is portrayed as a physically weak man of great intellect, his head (impaled on a spike at the end of the story) a "hive of subtlety". For Newton Arvin in 1950, Babo was "a monster out of Gothic fiction at its worst", for Frederick Busch in 1986 "Babo is the genius of the story", and it is "his brain the white men fear".

Later critics, such as Valerie Bonita Gray, regard Delano's "racial perceptions" as the cause of his blindness: "Delano never suspects the truth aboard the San Dominick because he stereotypes the mentality of the slaves", and sees them as "musical, good-humored and cheerful". In reality, enough incidents occur to suspect a "mutinous activity on the part of the slaves", but Delano "does not see them as intelligent human beings".

Other critics regard Melville's alteration of the year of events from 1799 to 1805, the Christopher Columbus motif, and the name of the San Dominick as allusions to the French colony then known as Saint-Domingue, called Santo Domingo in Spanish, one of the first landing places of Columbus. In the 1790s a slave revolt took place there under the leadership of Toussaint L'Ouverture, which led to the first free black republic in the Americas. According to scholar Hester Blum, the voyages of Columbus, "who initiated New World colonization and slavery," form the "negative inspiration" of Babo's revolt. Columbus's importance for the novella is signalled repeatedly, most dramatically by the "follow your leader"-sign under the figurehead: as revealed in the legal documents, Columbus's was the original figurehead who had been replaced by the skeleton.

Robertson-Lorent finds that "Melville indicts slavery without sentimentalizing either the blacks or the whites." Any apparently kind behavior toward the slaves is deceptive by nature: not only does such conduct not change the fact that the captain considers the slaves his property, but it also rests on the motif that it is a "purely self-serving" financial interest of the captain to treat his peculiar "cargo" well. The Americans display no better moral sense when they board the ship at the end of the story: it is not kindness that restrains them from killing the Africans, but their plan to claim the "cargo" for themselves. In addition to this principal state of affairs, "freedom within the confines of a slave ship did not protect the women against rape and sexual abuse," and in fact allowing the women to walk on the deck "made them more accessible to the lustful crew." Delano's impression of the female slaves is part of his overall misperception: "After Aranda's death, the women, whom Delano imagines to be as docile and sweet as does with their fawns, shave Aranda's bones clean with their hatchets, then hang his skeleton over the carved figurehead of Cristobal Colón as a warning to the surviving Spaniards."

=== The nature of perception ===
Bryant observes an epistemological dimension to the story, as Delano admires the black race not for its humanity but for its perceived servility. This prejudiced view renders Delano unable to see the black people's ability to revolt and unable to understand the slave ship's state of affairs. The issue is "not his lack of intelligence, but the shape of his mind, which can process reality only through the sieve of a culturally conditioned benevolent racism," and Delano is eventually "conned by his most cherished stereotypes." Berthoff sees a contrast between Delano and Don Benito's "awareness," caused by the "harrowingly different circumstances" through which they come to meet each other. Seeing no essential difference between Delano's consciousness and the more or less blind way of life of every human being, he sees the story "as composing a paradigm of the secret ambiguity of appearances--an old theme with Melville--and, more particularly, a paradigm of the inward life of ordinary consciousness, with all its mysterious shifts, penetrations, and side-slippings, in a world in which this ambiguity of appearances is the baffling norm."

Delbanco observes that Delano's psychology switches between tension and fear. Each time some anomaly occurs, such as the slave who stands unbowed before a white man trembling with fear, Delano contemplates the matter deeply and always thinks up a reason for feeling relieved.

==== The shaving scene ====
The scene of Babo's shaving of Don Benito is, in Delbanco's words, "a meditation on subjectivity itself." Captain Delano enjoys the sight of Babo performing the kind of personal service to his master Delano thinks blacks are especially well suited for, manicuring, hair-dressing, and barbering. (Note: As Melville's contemporary audience would have recognized, "these were, in fact, among the few trades open to free blacks in antebellum America.") Don Benito, on the other hand, shakes with fear. Apparently, Babo tests the blade across his palm, and for Delano the sound is that of a man humbling himself, while Cereno hears "the black man warning him: if you make one move toward candor, I will cut your throat." When Delano notices that the shaving cloth covering Don Benito is the Spanish flag, he finds this use an indignity that for a moment gives him occasion to see in Babo a "headsman" and in Don Benito "a man at the block", but quickly reassures himself that blacks are like children and therefore fond of bright colors, so that nothing is wrong with scene. In Delbanco's estimation, "Delano's capacity for self-deception is limitless."

Babo then draws a spot of blood from Don Benito with a flick of his razor, an accident he calls "Babo's first blood" and blames on Don Benito's shaking. He then concludes Don Benito's toilette with a comb, as if to put on a show for Delano. Then, just when Delano has preceded the other two out of the cabin, Babo cuts himself in the cheek. On deck, he shows Delano the bleeding and explains that this is Don Benito's punishment for the accident. Delano is momentarily shocked by this Spanish cruelty, but when he sees Babo and Don Benito reconciled he is relieved to notice that the outrage has passed.

=== Transatlantic contrasts ===
One other strain in criticism is to read in the story an almost Jamesian moral with Delano as the American who, "confronted with evil in unescapable form, wanted only to turn over a new leaf, to deny and to forget the lesson he ought to have learned." Such an American survives "by being less than fully human," while Europeans are "broken by the weight of their knowledge of and complicity in human evil." Literary historian Richard Gray calls the novella an interrogation of "the American optimism of its narrator [sic] and the European pessimism of its protagonist, Cereno, under the shadow of slavery." Delano represents a version of New England innocence which has also been read as strategy to ensure colonial power over both Spain and Africans in the "New World".

== Publication history ==
Melville probably wrote the novella in the winter of 1854–55. The first mentioning of it appears in a letter of 17 April 1855 from adviser George William Curtis to Joshua A. Dix, the publisher of Putnam's. Curtis expressed being "anxious" to read Melville's new story, which Dix then sent him. On 19 April Curtis wrote to Dix he found the story "very good", even though he regretted that Melville "did not work it up as a connected tale instead of putting in the dreary documents at the end." In a letter of 31 July Curtis still had reservations about "all the dreadful statistics at the end", but nevertheless proposed the serialization.

The novella was first serialized anonymously in Putnam's Monthly Magazine in three installments: no. 34, October 1855; no. 35, November 1855; and no. 36, December 1855. (Note: available through Cornell University at Putnam's Monthly) around the same time that DeBow's Review, a "virulently pro-slavery" magazine, denounced Putnam's as "the leading review of the Black Republican party", because the periodical was becoming "increasingly belligerent on the slavery issue."

The October Issue, the first installment also carried a piece on "the suicide of slavery", referring to the possible destruction of the republic. Thus, the novella appeared in a "partisan magazine committed to the anti-slavery cause."

On October 9, 1855, Evening Post correspondent "Pictor" revealed the source for the story, and inferred how it would end.

No record of payment for the novella survives, but apparently the magazine's new owners continued to pay Melville at the rate of $5.00 per page. Putnam's editorial advisor George William Curtis finished reading the novella as early as April, and recommended its acceptance to Joshua Dix, because it was "very striking & well done" on the whole, though he took "the dreary documents at the end" for a sign that Melville "does everything too hurriedly now." Despite Curtis's pressing to use it in the September issue—"You have paid for it", he wrote on 31 July—serializing began six months after he first voiced his approval.

The novella was included in The Piazza Tales, published by Dix & Edwards in May 1856 in the United States; in June the British edition appeared. The working title of this collection when Melville prepared the magazine pages as printer's copy was "Benito Cereno & Other Sketches". Melville wrote a note to be appended to the title of "Benito Cereno", either as a footnote or a headnote, in which he acknowledged his source. Biographer Hershel Parker believes he did this because Pictor had revealed the source for the novella. Melville decided to drop the note after the change of title meant that the stories were no longer presented as sketches but as tales. In his letter of February 16, 1856, to Dix & Edwards, Melville directed that the note be dropped "as the book is now to be published as a collection of 'Tales' , that note is unsuitable & had better be omitted." The editors of the Northwestern-Newberry edition infer that the note, which does not survive, would have revealed the relation between the story and Amasa Delano's original account, and that Melville thought this relationship was better left unrevealed in a "tale".

No other printing appeared during Melville's lifetime.

Among those editors was Richard Henry Dana, an anti-slavery activist whose Boston-based Vigilance Committee outfitted a vessel in 1852 dubbed the Moby Dick to ferry fugitive slaves to safety. By the time Benito Cereno was being composed and edited, Putnam’s was owned by Joshua Dix, Arthur Edwards, and silent partner Frederick Law Olmsted. Olmsted, who copyedited and proofread "Benito Cereno", is responsible for some of the idiosyncratic spelling in the tale’s Putnam’s version. In 1855, Olmsted, who would go on to cofound The Nation, was working on a series of books about the slaveholding South.

In 1926 the novella became the first separate edition of any of his short prose pieces when the Nonesuch Press published the 1856 text with illustrations by E. McKnight Kauffer.

== Reception ==
=== Contemporary reviews ===
According to scholar Johannes D. Bergmann, "Benito Cereno", "Bartleby", and "The Encantadas" were the most frequently praised by reviewers of the stories that make up The Piazza Tales. Most reviews were unsigned, and not all singled out either "Benito Cereno" or any other individual story, but described the collection as a whole. On 9 July 1856, the Springfield Republican compared the collection to Hawthorne's best work, "Marked by a delicate fancy, a bright and most fruitful imagination, a pure and translucent style and a certain weirdness of conceit." "The legends themselves," wrote the Athenaeum for 26 July, "have a certain wild and ghostly power; but the exaggeration of their teller's manner appears to be on the increase." Also taking the stories together, the United States Democratic Review for September 1856 wrote that "All of them exhibit that peculiar richness of language, descriptive vitality, and splendidly sombre imagination which are the author's characteristics."

On 4 June 1856, the New Bedford Daily Mercury found that "Benito Cereno" was "told with due gravity." The New York Tribune on 23 June singled out "Benito Cereno" and "The Encantadas" as stories that were "fresh specimens of Mr. Melville's sea-romances, but cannot be regarded as improvements on his former popular productions in that kind." The New York Times for 27 June found "Benito Cereno" "melodramatic, not effective." As if describing a detective story, the Knickerbocker for September 1856 called the piece "most painfully interesting, and in reading it we become nervously anxious for the solution of the mystery it involves."

=== Later critical history ===
The Melville Revival of the early 1920s produced the first collected edition of his works, and the publication of the Constable edition of The Piazza Tales in 1922 marked a turning-point in the evaluation of the short fiction, with Michael Sadleir's remark in Excursions in Victorian Bibliography that Melville's genius is "more perfectly and skillfully revealed" in the short fiction than it is in Moby-Dick. "'Benito Cereno' and 'The Encantadas' hold in the small compass of their beauty the essence of their author's supreme artistry". Harold H. Scudder's 1928 study of Melville's major literary source for the story was the first scholarly article on the short fiction.

In the 1950s, American author Hisaye Yamamoto sympathized with Melville’s interpretation of character Babo, as noted in her exchange of letters with Stanford English Professor Yvor Winters. Winters declared the character as an “embodiment of evil”, protesting Yamamoto’s “root” for Babo.

Academic study of the novella expanded, with gradually increasing numbers of annual publications on the story through the decades. Some of the most influential critics had little regard for the novella; however, F. O. Matthiessen wrote that, after Moby-Dick, Melville only succeeded twice in achieving the fusion of "the inner and the outer world": in Benito Cereno and Billy Budd. Calling Benito Cereno one of Melville's "most sensitively poised pieces of writing", he observed that the tension in the story depended on how "the captain's mind sidles round and round the facts, almost seeing them at one moment only to be ingenuously diverted at the next". Matthiessen assumed a clear distinction of moral values, with "the embodiment of good in the pale Spanish captain and of evil in the mutinied African crew", leading him to object: "Although the Negroes were savagely vindictive and drove a terror of blackness into Cereno's heart, the fact remains that they were slaves and that evil had thus originally been done to them." According to him, Melville's perceived failure to reckon with this makes his story, "for all its prolonged suspense, comparatively superficial".

Reviewing scholarship and criticism up to 1970, Nathalia Wright observed that most essays were "divided between a moral - metaphysical interpretation (Babo being the embodiment of evil, Delano of unperceptive good will) and a socio-political one (the slaves corresponding chiefly to those in nineteenth-century America)." The second category can be further divided into three groups: critics who saw "sympathy for the slaves," a few who recognized "pro-slavery or ambivalent sentiments," and those who concentrated on "Delano as a naive American," one of whom identified "Cereno with Europe."

In the years after the Second World War readers found the story "embarrassing for its presumed racist treatment of the Africans", while more recent readers, by contrast, "acknowledge Melville's naturalistic critique of racism."

German right-wing jurist and political philosopher Carl Schmitt heavily pondered on the story over a long time, sympathizing and identifying with the deposed captain Cereno and commenting on the story in his personal correspondence as well in his 1950 memoir Ex Captivitate Salus written while imprisoned for the Nuremberg trials. Schmitt even signed a few personal letters with the name Benito Cereno.

The famous question of what had cast such a shadow upon Cereno was used by American author Ralph Ellison as an epigraph to his 1952 novel Invisible Man, excluding Cereno's answer, "The negro."

== Adaptations ==
Poet Robert Lowell wrote a stage adaptation of Benito Cereno for The Old Glory, his trilogy of plays, in 1964. The Old Glory was initially produced off-Broadway in 1964 for the American Place Theatre with Frank Langella and Roscoe Lee Browne as its stars and was later staged during the 1965-66 season of the television series NET Playhouse. It was later revived off-Broadway in 1976. In 2011, Benito Cereno was performed in another off-Broadway production without the other two plays of the trilogy.

In 1969, produced by the French company Les Films Niepce, Serge Roullet directed a film adaptation of Benito Cereno, also titled by the titular character.

Yusef Komunyakaa wrote a poem, "Captain Amasa Delano's Dilemma," based on Benito Cereno. The poem was first published in American Poetry Review in 1996.

Gary J. Whitehead's poem "Babo Speaks from Lima," based on Benito Cereno, was first published in Leviathan: A Journal of Melville Studies in 2003. It was reprinted in A Glossary of Chickens (Princeton University Press, 2013).

Benito Cereno was adapted by Stephen Douglas Burton as one of three one-act operas in his 1975 trilogy, An American Triptych.
