= My Fellow Americans =

1996 American buddy comedy film directed by Peter Segal

- Theatrical release poster
- Directed by: Peter Segal
- Screenplay by: E. Jack Kaplan; Richard Chapman; Peter Tolan
- Story by: E. Jack Kaplan; Richard Chapman
- Produced by: Jon Peters
- Starring: Jack Lemmon; James Garner; Dan Aykroyd; John Heard; Wilford Brimley; Everett McGill; Bradley Whitford; Lauren Bacall
- Cinematography: Julio Macat
- Edited by: William Kerr
- Music by: William Ross
- Production companies: Peters Entertainment; Storyline Entertainment
- Distributed by: Warner Bros.
- Release date: December 20, 1996
- Running time: 101 minutes
- Country: United States
- Language: English
- Budget: $21.5 million
- Box office: $22.3 million

My Fellow Americans is a 1996 American political comedy film directed by Peter Segal. It stars Jack Lemmon and James Garner as feuding ex-presidents, with Dan Aykroyd, Lauren Bacall, Esther Rolle, John Heard, Wilford Brimley, Bradley Whitford, Everett McGill, and Jeff Yagher in supporting roles. The film is named after the traditional opening sentence of presidential addresses to the American people.

My Fellow Americans was released by Warner Bros. on December 20, 1996. The film received mixed reviews from critics and grossed $22.3 million against a $21.5 million budget.

== Plot ==
Republican senator Russell Kramer wins the presidential election, narrowly defeating archrival Democratic governor Matt Douglas. Four years later, Douglas wins a landslide victory over the now-incumbent Kramer. Another four years later, Kramer's former vice president, William Haney, defeats Douglas. Haney's vice president, Ted Matthews, is widely seen as an idiot, and becomes an embarrassment for the administration. Three more years later, Kramer is spending his time writing books and speaking at inconsequential functions, while Douglas is finishing his own book and getting divorced.

Meanwhile, the Democratic Party learns about "Olympia", the codename for several bribes that defense contractor Charlie Reynolds paid Haney when he was vice president. DNC chairman Joe Hollis asks Douglas to investigate, offering the support of the Democrats for a presidential run in return for his help. Douglas accepts. Meanwhile, Haney and his Chief of Staff Carl Witnaur plot to frame Kramer for the scandal, despite Haney's private acknowledgment to Witnaur that Kramer had known nothing about it. When rumors begin to suggest that Kramer was involved in Olympia, he begins his own investigation.

NSA agent Colonel Tanner has Reynolds assassinated when he attempts to tell Douglas the truth about Olympia. Kramer arrives at the scene to find Douglas with Reynolds' body. Before they can flee, Douglas and Kramer are forced to board Marine One by Tanner, who claims they will be taken to Camp David for their security at Haney's request. During the flight, Douglas realizes they are heading in the wrong direction. They force the pilots to land. They then disembark, just minutes before the airborne helicopter explodes.

Kramer and Douglas are left stranded, aware that the explosion was meant to kill them. They decide to go to Kramer's presidential Library to obtain records the miserly Kramer kept of all meals served during his time in the White House, which will prove Haney was present at a key meeting with Reynolds. On the way, they meet various ordinary Americans and see the effects their terms in office have had. After several close encounters with NSA agents, they arrive at the library and discover the evidence has been tampered with to implicate Kramer. A guard gives Kramer a message from Reynolds' secretary stating that Witnaur had recently met with Reynolds. Douglas and Kramer kidnap Witnaur and with Hollis's help, force him to reveal the plot to frame Kramer, though Witnaur claims to know nothing about the attempts on their lives, blaming Tanner. Initially they decide to report Witnaur's confession to journalist Kaye Griffin, but Douglas, reflecting upon their adventure, convinces Kramer to go directly to the White House to confront Haney personally, seeing it as a chance of redemption for their poor choices as presidents.

They sneak into the White House with the help of Rita, the White House Chef and make it to the Executive Residence but discover that Haney is giving a press conference outside. Tanner traps Douglas and Kramer in a guest room but they escape via a secret tunnel while the NSA gives chase. Tanner catches up with them and is about to shoot them when he himself is killed by a Secret Service sniper who has recognized the presidents from a chance encounter at a gay pride parade during their adventure.

Douglas and Kramer interrupt Haney's speech and take him to the Oval Office to talk. There they play Haney a tape of Witnaur's confession, but Haney denies knowledge of Reynolds' murder or the helicopter explosion. Haney agrees to resign and gives a resignation speech, citing heart problems. Douglas and Kramer muse that the idiotic Matthews will now become president and realize the only way it could have happened was under these circumstances. The pair confront Matthews, who admits his stupidity is just an act and that he, not Haney, had engineered the entire plot so that he could become president, knowing Haney would take the fall. Douglas secretly tapes his confession, and (later) Matthews is convicted and sent to prison.

Nine months later, Douglas and Kramer are running together as independents in the presidential election, arguing which of them will be the nominee for president and which will run for vice-president. Douglas distracts Kramer by throwing a a wad of cash on the ground, then grabs the microphone to (presumably) announce himself as the presidential candidate.

== Cast ==
- Jack Lemmon as President Russell Kramer
- James Garner as President Matt Douglas
- Dan Aykroyd as President William Haney
- John Heard as Vice President Ted Matthews
- Wilford Brimley as DNC Chair Joe Hollis
- Lauren Bacall as First Lady Margaret Kramer
- Sela Ward as Kaye Griffin, journalist
- Everett McGill as NSA Agent Colonel Paul Tanner
- Bradley Whitford as Chief of Staff Carl Witnaur
- James Rebhorn as Charlie Reynolds, Defense Contractor
- Esther Rolle as Rita, the White House Chef
- Jeff Yagher as U.S. Secret Service Lieutenant Ralph Fleming / Dorothy
- Jack Kehler as Wayne
- Edwin Newman as Himself
- Jack Garner as President Haney's Caddy
- Conchata Ferrell as Woman Truck Driver
- Tom Everett as NSA Agent Wilkerson
- Michael Peña as Ernesto
- Wayne Duvall as U.S. Secret Service Agent Chet
- Marg Helgenberger as Joanna

== Production ==
The film had initially been written for Walter Matthau and Jack Lemmon before the Matthau role ultimately went to James Garner due to Matthau vacating for health reasons. In an interview with Variety, Garner stated both he and Lemmon had wanted to work together for a long time and saw the film as an opportunity to do so. The character of DNC Chair Joe Hollis was initially to be played by Daniel Benzali, but left the role due to scheduling conflicts with his series Murder One and was replaced with Wilford Brimley. According to Garner, the film was kept apolitical with no real life presidents, current or past, mentioned by name nor were the characters based on any real life administrations.

=== Filming ===
Most of the filming took place in the mountains of western North Carolina. Scenes were filmed along the Broad River where it flows into Lake Lure in Rutherford County, Dillsboro, along the Great Smoky Mountains Railroad; Waynesville, where a giant clown sign crashes through their windshield as they try to flee and where they find the baby in the stolen car is in Marshall, North Carolina; and in Asheville, at the Biltmore Estate.

In Asheville, North Carolina, the downtown area stands in for an unnamed town in West Virginia. There, the Western Carolina University Marching Band portrays the "All Dorothy Marching Band" (a fictional group based on Dorothy Gale in The Wizard of Oz), at a gay pride parade.

In his memoirs, Garner wrote that he enjoyed working with Lemmon but felt Segal "was a self appointed genius who didn't know his ass from second base and Jack and I both knew it."

== Reception ==
My Fellow Americans received mixed reviews from critics. It holds a 48% rating on Rotten Tomatoes based on 61 reviews and the critical consensus: "It doesn't commit any impeachable offenses, but My Fellow Americans lacks strong regulatory oversight of its toothless political satire and misuse of comedic talent."

Roger Ebert of the Chicago Sun-Times praised Lemmon and Garner, but felt the film was "a series of cheap shots and missed opportunities". However, he said that "a lot of the cheap shots are funny, and maybe the climate is wrong for sharply barbed political satire. I dunno. This is not a great comedy and will be soon forgotten, but it has nice moments." James Berardinelli of ReelViews also complimented the actors, writing "Lemmon and Garner slip comfortably into their roles" and saying the movie has "some good one-liners", but he criticized the "failed attempts to inject embarrassingly trite melodrama and recycled action sequences into the story" and also felt the political satire was "weak and obligatory". Mick LaSalle of the San Francisco Chronicle described My Fellow Americans as a "pleasing but mediocre film, with a great cast, a great story and a misguided script."
