= Manaos (film) =

- Directed by: Alberto Vázquez-Figueroa
- Cinematography: Alejandro Ulloa
- Music by: Franco Bixio; Fabio Frizzi; Vince Tempera
- Release date: 1979
- Language: Spanish

Manaos (also known as Slaves from Prison Camp Manaos) is a 1979 Spanish-Italian-Méxican adventure film directed by Alberto Vázquez-Figueroa.

== Cast ==
- Fabio Testi: Arquimedes
- Agostina Belli: Claudia
- Jorge Rivero: Howard
- Andrés García: Carmelo Sierra
- Florinda Bolkan: Manuela Aranda
- Jorge Luke: Ramiro
- Alberto de Mendoza: Mario Buendía
