= The Encantadas =

1854 novella by Herman Melville

"The Encantadas, or Enchanted Isles", is a novella by American author Herman Melville. First published in Putnam's Magazine in 1854, it consists of ten philosophical "Sketches" on the Galápagos Islands, then frequently known as the "Enchanted Islands" (Spanish: Islas Encantadas) from the treacherous winds and currents around them. It was collected in The Piazza Tales in 1856. The Encantadas was a success with the critics and contains some of Melville's "most memorable prose".

== Plot ==
An anonymous narrator unites the ten disparate "Sketches", each of which begin with a few lines of poetry, mostly taken from Edmund Spenser's The Faerie Queene. All of the stories are replete with symbolism reinforcing the cruelty of life on the Encantadas. "Sketch First" is a description of the islands; though they are the Enchanted Isles they are depicted as desolate and hellish. "Sketch Second" is a meditation on the narrator's encounter with ancient Galápagos tortoises, while "Sketch Third" concerns the narrator's trip up the enormous tower called the Rock Rodondo. "Sketch Fourth" details the narrator's musings from atop the tower, and his recollection of the islands' accidental discovery by Juan Fernández. "Sketch Fifth" describes the USS Essex' encounter with a phantom British ship near the area during the War of 1812.

Sketches Sixth through Ninth tell stories of individual islands. "Sketch Sixth" describes Barrington Isle, once home to a group of buccaneers. "Sketch Seventh, Charles's Isle and the Dog-King" is about Charles's Isle, formerly the site of a colony governed by a soldier who had taken the island as his payment for his role in the Peruvian War of Independence. He maintained order through his group of vicious attack dogs, but was eventually banished by the colonists who instituted a "riotocracy" of escaped sailors that protected them from their former captains and "gloried in having no law but lawlessness."

"Sketch Eighth, Norfolk Isle and the Chola Widow" is one of the most celebrated of the segments. In a manner similar to the rescue of Juana Maria, the "Lone Woman of San Nicolas Island" in California, who had been rescued only a year prior to The Encantadas' publication, the narrator describes how his ship had found a woman who had been living alone on Norfolk Isle for years. Hunilla, a "chola" (mestizo) from Payta, Peru, had come to the island with her newlywed husband and her brother to hunt tortoises; the French captain who dropped them off promised to return for them, but never did. One day, the husband and brother built a raft to go fishing, but hit a reef and drowned. Hunilla was utterly alone on the island until the narrator's ship arrived, except for one occasion in which she encountered whalers (what happened was so horrible that neither Hunilla nor the narrator would speak of it), and the sailors are so moved by her story that they return her to land and give her whatever money they can scrape up. The narrator last sees her riding to her hometown on the back of a donkey, an image strongly evoking Christ's ride into Jerusalem in John 12:12-20.

"Sketch Ninth, Hood's Isle and the Hermit Oberlus" tells the story of Oberlus, a former sailor who takes up residence on Hood's Isle and eventually captures four men he makes his slaves. He murders passersby and takes their possessions until his behavior finally runs him afoul of the authorities. "Sketch Tenth, Runaways, Castaways, Solitaries, Gravestones, Etc." is the narrator's description of the human aspects of life on the Encantadas and the relics left behind by former inhabitants.

== Autobiographical elements ==
At the turn of 1840-1841, Melville signed up for a voyage aboard the whaler Acushnet. On October 30, 1841, the ship sighted Albemarle on the Galápagos Islands. Around October 31, the Acushnet spoke with the Phenix of Nantucket. Events on or around this date furnished Melville with the basis for the visit to Rock Rodondo in "Sketch Third". On November 2, the Acushnet and four other American whalers hunted the grounds around the Galápagos Islands together; in "Sketch Fourth" Melville exaggerated the number of ships, though the story itself is told from the perspective of the fictional Salvator R. Tarnmoor.

== The Composition ==
Like all of the stories later included in The Piazza Tales, Melville wrote The Encantadas while in financial straits after the failure of his novels Moby-Dick and Pierre: or, The Ambiguities. Putnam's invited him to contribute material in 1852; he began to write, but never finished, a story on the abandoned wife Agatha Hatch Robertson that year, and submitted his famous work "Bartleby, the Scrivener" in 1853. In 1854 he contributed The Encantadas, which became the most critically successful of the Piazza Tales.

The ten sketches of "The Encantadas" go back to Melville's whaling years, during which he visited the Galapagos Islands, supplemented with material from his reading in at least six books of Pacific voyages. According to the editors of The Piazza Tales, reliance on personal experience seems most prominent in the first four sketches, yet even here Melville drew upon "a number of other writers", though he only named William Cowley. Neither is the attribution at the end of the fifth sketch—where Cowley, Colnett, and Porter are mentioned—complete, for Melville borrowed from James Burney as well, probably from A Chronological History of the Discoveries in the South Sea or Pacific Ocean, published from 1803 to 1817. Neither did he mention The Voyage of the Beagle by Charles Darwin, which he used in the first sketch and possibly parodied in sketch four.

In the fourth sketch Cowley's Voyage Round the Globe from 1699 is quoted. The basis for the fifth sketch is Journal of a Cruise Made to the Pacific Ocean by Captain David Porter, first published in 1815, which Melville had first used for Typee. This book "provided ore for at least a dozen passages", including the Oberlus story in the ninth sketch and the epitaph which concludes the tenth. In sketch six, Melville applied the brief description of James Island which he found in A Voyage to the South Atlantic and Round Cape Horn into the Pacific Ocean by Captain James Colnett, published in 1798, to Barrington Isle.

A month after the collection was published, Melville's old friend Richard Tobias Greene, on whom Toby in Typee was based, wrote him a letter expressing how the Encantadas sketches "had called up reminiscences of days gone by".

== Publication history ==
The work was first published as "The Encantadas, or Enchanted Isles" under the pseudonym "Salvator R. Tarnmoor," in three installments in Putnam's Monthly Magazine for March, April, and May, 1854. Melville earned $50 for each installment. It appeared in The Piazza Tales published by Dix & Edwards in May 1856 in the United States and in June in Britain. Neither that collection of short stories nor "The Encantadas" as a separate item were reprinted during Melville's lifetime.

== Reception ==
"The Encantadas" was one of the stories frequently singled out by reviewers of The Piazza Tales, mostly to compare the sketches to the author's first books. The New York Atlas found that the sketches were written in "the style of the author's first works", and praised the sketches because "a more vivid picture of the fire-and-barren-curst Gallipagos we have never read". For the Southern Literary Messenger the sketches were the product of the author's extraordinary imagination, which took the reader "into that 'wild, weird clime, out of space, out of time,' which is the scene of his earliest and most popular writings."

Commenting upon the original appearance in Putnam's Monthly Magazine, the New York Dispatch cited the chapters as "universally considered among the most interesting papers of that popular Magazine, and each successive chapter was read with avidity by thousands." The reviewer called the sketches "a sort of mixture of 'Mardi' and 'Robinson Crusoe'--though far more interesting than the first named work."

== Adaptations ==
Kenneth Gaburo completed a one-act opera, The Widow, based on The Encantadas in 1961. Four years later, Portuguese director Carlos Vilardebó directed an adaptation in a Portuguese-French coproduction, starring Portuguese fado singer and actress Amália as Hunilla (the film is essentially based on "Sketch Eight").

In 1983, American composer, Tobias Picker wrote The Encantadas for narrator and orchestra. The piece was given its world premiere that year by the Albany Symphony Orchestra and recorded on Virgin Classics by The Houston Symphony with John Gielgud as narrator. Each of the work's six movements evokes a different picture of life in the Galapagos Islands’ equatorial wilderness.

== Bibliography ==
- Bergmann, Johannes D. (1986). "Melville's Tales." A Companion to Melville Studies. Edited by John Bryant. New York, Westport, Connecticut, London: Greenwood Press. ISBN 0-313-23874-X
- Branch, Watson G. (ed.) (1974). Melville: The Critical Heritage. Edited by Watson G. Branch. The Critical Heritage Series. First paperback edition, 1985, London and Boston: Routledge & Kegan Paul. ISBN 0-7102-0513-9
- Bryant, John (2001). "Herman Melville: A Writer in Process." Herman Melville, Tales, Poems, and Other Writings. Edited, with an Introduction and Notes, by John Bryant. New York: The Modern Library. ISBN 0-679-64105-X
- Delbanco, Andrew (2005). Melville: His World and Work. New York: Knopf. ISBN 0-375-40314-0
- Hayford, Harrison, Alma A. MacDougall, and G. Thomas Tanselle (1987). "Notes on Individual Prose Pieces." In Melville 1987.
- Matthiessen, F.O. (1941). American Renaissance: Art and Expression in the Age of Emerson and Whitman. London, Toronto, New York: Oxford University Press.
- Melville, Herman (March–May 1854), "Encantadas or the Enchanted Isles", Putnam's Monthly, vol. 3, New York: G.P. Putnam's Sons, pp. 311–319, 345–355, 460–466, as "Salvator R. Tarnmoor".
- Melville, Herman; Busch, Frederick (Ed.) (1986). Billy Budd and Other Stories. New York: Penguin. ISBN 0-14-039053-7.
- Melville, Herman (1987). The Piazza Tales and Other Prose Pieces 1839-1860. Edited by Harrison Hayford, Alma A. MacDougall, G. Thomas Tanselle, and others. The Writings of Herman Melville Volume Nine. Evanston and Chicago: Northwestern University Press and The Newberry Library. ISBN 0-8101-0550-0
- Milder, Robert (1988). "Herman Melville." Columbia Literary History of the United States. Emory Elliott, General Editor. New York: Columbia University Press. ISBN 0-231-05812-8
- Miller, Perry (1956). The Raven and the Whale: The War of Words and Wits in the Era of Poe and Melville. New York: Harcourt, Brace and Company.
- Parker, Hershel (1996). Herman Melville: A Biography. Volume I, 1819–1851. Baltimore: Johns Hopkins University Press. ISBN 0-8018-5428-8
- Parker, Hershel (2002). Herman Melville: A Biography. Volume 2, 1851-1891. Baltimore: Johns Hopkins University Press. ISBN 0-8018-5428-8
- Robertson-Lorant, Laurie (1996). Melville: A Biography. New York: Clarkson Potter/Publishers. ISBN 0-517-59314-9
- Sealts, Merton M., Jr. (1987). "Historical Note." In Melville (1987).
- Sealts, Merton M., Jr. (1988). Melville's Reading. Revised and Enlarged Edition. University of South Carolina Press. ISBN 0-87249-515-9
