= Red Gold (film) =

- Directed by: Alberto Vázquez-Figueroa
- Written by: Alberto Vázquez-Figueroa
- Starring: José Sacristán; Isela Vega; Hugo Stiglitz
- Release date: 1978
- Running time: 88 minute
- Countries: Spain; Mexico
- Language: Spanish

Red Gold (also known as Ojo rojo) is a 1978 pirate film that was written and directed by Alberto Vázquez-Figueroa. It was filmed on location in Spain and Mexico.

== Plot ==
A boatswain finds himself stranded on an island. Surrounded by starving, poor islanders, the boatswain soon learns that the misery is not caused by the people themselves, but rather by a pack of blood-thirsty pirates.

== Cast ==
- José Sacristán as Beni
- Isela Vega as María
- Hugo Stiglitz as Víctor
- Patricia Adriani as Aurelia
- Jorge Luke as Lucas de Almeyda

== Awards ==
José Sacristán won the Sant Jordi Award for Best Spanish Actor (Mejor Actor Español) in 1979.
