= Field of Honor (1986 film) =

- Part of movie poster
- Directed by: Kim Dae-hie; Hans Scheepmaker
- Written by: Henk Bos; Kim Dae-hie
- Produced by: Yoram Globus; Menahem Golan; Hyeon-suk Han
- Starring: Everett McGill; Ron Brandsteder; Bart Römer
- Cinematography: Hein Groot; Eung-Hwi Heo
- Edited by: Victorine Habets
- Music by: Roy Budd
- Distributed by: Cannon Films
- Release dates: 26 September 1986 (South Korea); 19 March 1987 (Netherlands)
- Running time: 110 min
- Countries: Netherlands; South Korea
- Languages: English; Korean

Field of Honor (Dutch: Het veld van eer) is a 1986 Dutch/South Korean war film set during the Korean War, directed by Kim Dae-hie and Hans Scheepmaker.

== Plot ==
After an attack by Chinese troops, a Dutch sergeant (whose troops committed atrocities against the local population) finds himself alone in the field. He meets a young Korean woman who tries to save her little brother who is shell shocked. This changes the sergeant's outlook on the war.

== Cast ==
- Everett McGill – Sergeant 'Sire' De Koning
- Ron Brandsteder – Tiny
- Bart Römer – Lieutenant
- Anis de Jong – Taihutu (as Annies De Jong)
- Lee Hye-young – Sun Yi (as Hey Young Lee]
- Kim Dong-hyeon – Applesan (as Dong Hyum Kim)
- Min Yu – Kim
- Marc Van Eeghem – Brammetje
- Frank Schaafsma – Wiel
- Guus van der Made – Leen
- Choi Jae-ho – Chinese Medic (as Jae Ho Choi)
- Mike Mooney – Journalist
- Jon Bluming – Platoon Sergeant
- Fritz Homann – Truck Driver
- David Hartung – Radioman

== Reception ==
The film got a negative review in the Dutch communist newspaper De Waarheid.
