= Everett McGill =

American actor (born 1945)

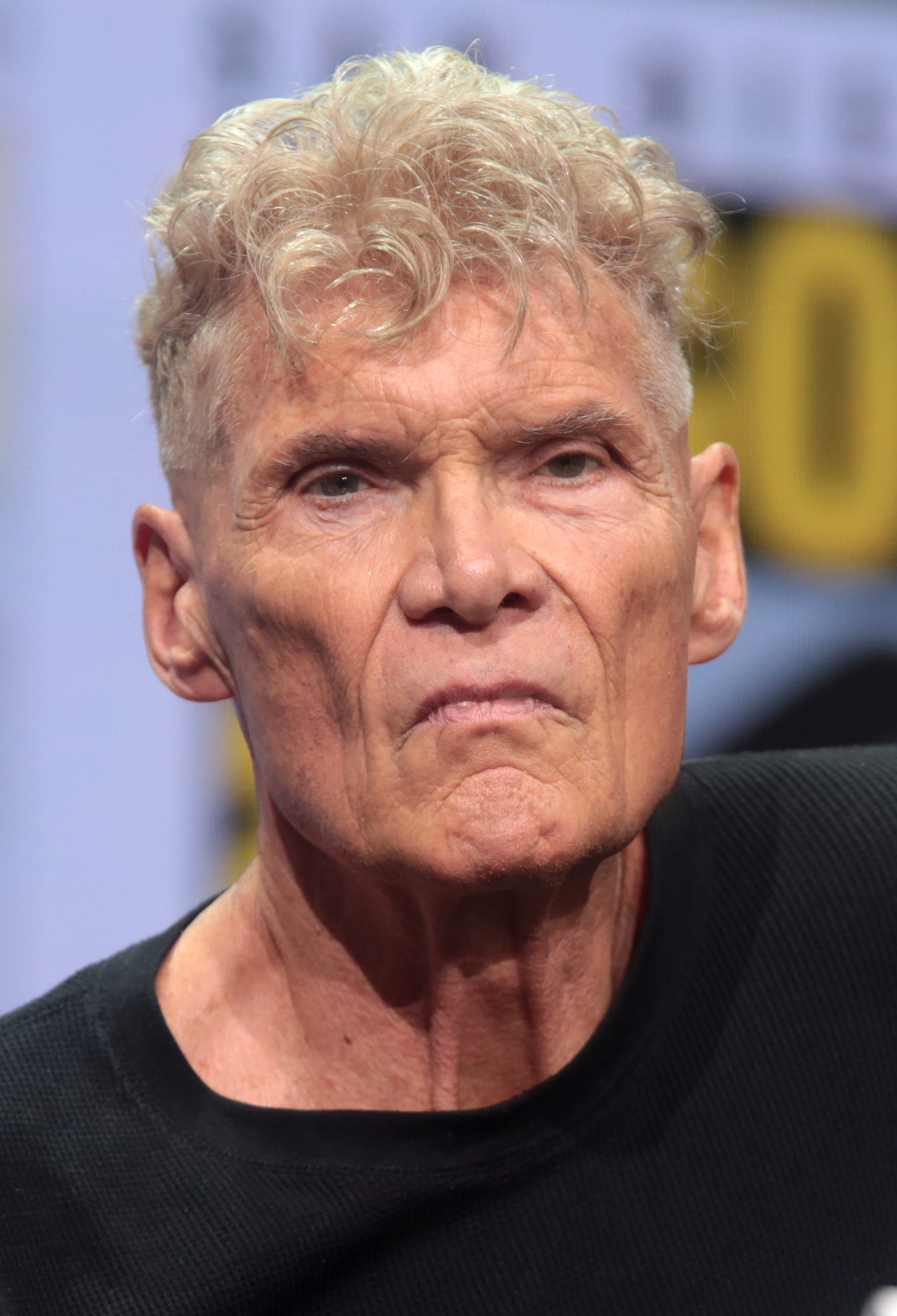
- McGill at the 2017 San Diego Comic-Con
- Born: Charles Everett McGill III; October 21, 1945 (age 80); Miami Beach, Florida, U.S.
- Occupation: Actor
- Years active: 1972–1999, 2015–2017

Charles Everett McGill III (born October 21, 1945) is an American retired actor, who rose to prominence for his portrayal of a caveman in Quest for Fire (1981). He went on to have prominent roles in the films Dune (1984), Silver Bullet (1985), Heartbreak Ridge (1986), Iguana (1988), Licence to Kill (1989), The People Under the Stairs (1991) and Under Siege 2: Dark Territory (1995).

On television he appeared as "Big" Ed Hurley in Twin Peaks (1990–1991). He retired from acting in 1999, but returned for the revival of Twin Peaks.

== Early life ==
McGill was born in Miami Beach, Florida. He graduated from Rosedale High School in Kansas City, Kansas, in 1963 and the University of Missouri-Kansas City in 1967.

== Career ==
McGill has a relatively short filmography and has made something of a career of playing sadistic military types or terrorists. He managed to garner some level of fame by appearing in films such as Brubaker starring Robert Redford. McGill's roles include Chad Richards on the soap opera The Guiding Light in 1975 and 1976. After coming into the public eye in 1981 for his leading role as the rugged caveman Naoh in Quest for Fire, McGill appeared in Silver Bullet, a 1985 werewolf film inspired by a Stephen King short story; the Korean War battle epic Field of Honor and the Clint Eastwood war film Heartbreak Ridge in 1986; and in the 1989 installment of the James Bond franchise Licence to Kill. In 1988, McGill played the title role in Iguana directed by Monte Hellman. In 1990–91, he appeared in the television series Twin Peaks. In 1991, McGill reunited with his Twin Peaks co-star Wendy Robie; the two appeared as the villains of the Wes Craven feature The People Under the Stairs. In 1996, he starred in the film My Fellow Americans alongside James Garner and Jack Lemmon.

He has worked on a number of occasions with director David Lynch. McGill first worked with Lynch in the 1984 adaptation of Frank Herbert's Dune, in which he played Fremen leader Stilgar. McGill later appeared as Ed Hurley on Lynch's television series Twin Peaks. McGill also appeared in Lynch's 1999 film The Straight Story.

After Lynch searched for him in his country home, the actor and director reunited, and McGill decided to come out of retirement specifically to reprise the role of Big Ed Hurley, in the 2017 revival of Twin Peaks.

== Filmography ==
- Yanks (1979) as White G.I. at dance
- Union City (1980) as Larry Longacre
- Brubaker (1980) as Eddie Caldwell
- Quest for Fire (1981) as Naoh
- Dune (1984) as Stilgar
- Silver Bullet (1985) as Reverend Lester Lowe
- Field of Honor (1986) as Sergeant "Sire" De Koning
- Heartbreak Ridge (1986) as Major Malcolm Powers
- Iguana (1988) as Oberlus
- Licence to Kill (1989) as Ed Killifer
- Jezebel's Kiss (1990) as Sheriff Dan Riley
- Twin Peaks (1990–1991/2017) as Big Ed Hurley
- The People Under the Stairs (1991) as Eldon "Daddy" Robeson
- Under Siege 2: Dark Territory (1995) as Marcus Penn
- My Fellow Americans (1996) as Colonel Paul Tanner
- Jekyll Island (1998) as Dalton Bradford
- The Straight Story (1999) as Tom the John Deere Dealer
