= Ocean (TV series) =

- Created by: Alberto Vázquez-Figueroa
- Written by: Alberto Vázquez-Figueroa; Roberto Leoni
- Directed by: Ruggero Deodato
- Composer: Pino Donaggio
- Country of origin: Italy
- No. of seasons: 1
- No. of episodes: 6

Production
- Producer: Giuseppe Bertolucci
- Running time: 60 minutes

Original release
- Network: Rai 1
- Release: 1989 – 1989

Ocean is an Italian miniseries created by Alberto Vázquez-Figueroa.

== Series premise ==
A young man, Asdrubale, must go into hiding after protecting his sister from the son of a rich landowner.

== Cast ==
- Irene Papas
- Mario Adorf
- William Berger
- Lou Castel
- Anna Kanakis
- David Hess
- Adam Arkin
- Martin Balsam
- Marisa Berenson
- Senta Berger
- Ernest Borgnine

== See also ==
- List of Italian television series
