= The Piazza Tales =

1856 short story collection by Herman Melville

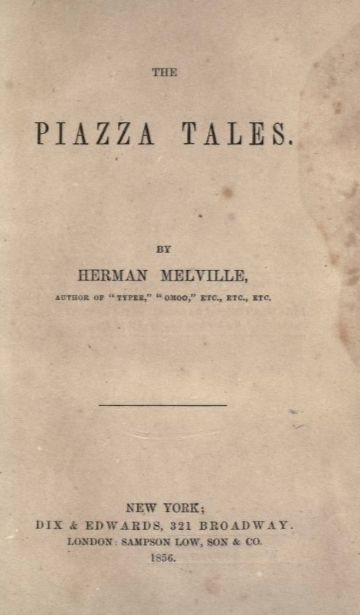
- Title page for The Piazza Tales (1856)
- Author: Herman Melville
- Language: English
- Genre: Literary fiction, short stories
- Published: May 1856 (American edition), June 1856 (British edition) (Dix, Edwards & Co.)
- Publication place: United States
- Media type: Print

The Piazza Tales is a collection of six short stories by American writer Herman Melville, published by Dix & Edwards in the United States in May 1856 and in Britain in June. Except for the newly written title story, "The Piazza," all of the stories had appeared in Putnam's Monthly between 1853 and 1855. The collection includes what have long been regarded as three of Melville's most important achievements in the genre of short fiction, "Bartleby, the Scrivener", "Benito Cereno", and "The Encantadas", his sketches of the Galápagos Islands. (Billy Budd, arguably his greatest piece of short fiction, would remain unpublished in his lifetime.)

Melville had originally intended to entitle the volume Benito Cereno and Other Sketches, but settled on the definitive title after he had written the introductory story. The book received largely favorable reviews, with reviewers especially praising "The Encantadas" but did not sell well enough to get Melville out of his financial straits, probably because short fiction for magazines had little appeal to bookbuyers. From after Melville's rediscovery to the end of the twentieth century, the short works that attracted the most critical attention were "Bartleby," "Benito Cereno" and "The Encantadas," with "The Piazza" a little behind those.

== Background and publication history ==
After reviewers denigrated Moby-Dick in 1851, Harper brothers changed the terms for its successor, Pierre; or, The Ambiguities. Melville's London publisher Richard Bentley would not publish Pierre without alterations after he saw the American proofs in 1852, which Melville could not accept. Pierre found no British publisher and hence Melville received no advance payment in the summer of 1852. The reviews for Pierre were harsh, and this damaged Melville's reputation the more because the reviews followed upon the mixed reception of the whaling novel.

In the spring of 1853 Melville could not get his next work printed, most likely, Sealts thinks, because Harper "simply refused to bring out another work by Herman Melville in the following year to risk the renewed wrath of already hostile reviewers". Under the circumstances, publishing anonymously seemed an attractive strategy, and the firm did ask him to write for Harper's New Monthly Magazine. His contributions to that periodical were not collected in a book during his lifetime.

=== Putnam's Monthly Magazine ===
In October 1852, editor Charles Frederick Briggs sent a circular out to writers, including Melville, announcing the plan "to publish an Original periodical of a character different from any now in existence", inviting him, being among "the best talent of the country", to submit contributions to the new monthly that would only print American contributions. This was Putnam's Monthly Magazine that first appeared in January 1853. With the ambition to be, in Perry Miller's words, "the vehicle of home literature" came the determination to pay authors a handsome sum. For three years the magazine was successful, in Miller's estimation because of the brilliance of both the articles and of the editing—primarily by Briggs, who understood that "'A man buys a Magazine to be amused'".

Melville received the February issue, which carried a summary of Melville's career in the shape of an essay by Fitz-James O'Brien, a young Irish immigrant. According to Parker, this publication was "the first retrospective survey of Melville's career anyone had ever published".

Melville's first contribution, "Bartleby. A Story of Wall-Street", was published in two installments in the magazine's first year of existence, in no. 11 (November), and no. 12 (December). "The Encantadas, or Enchanted Isles" appeared in three installments in 1854, in no. 15 (March), no. 16 (April), and no. 17 (May). "The Lightning-Rod Man" appeared in 1854, in no. 20 (August).

In March 1855, Putnam sold the magazine to Dix and Edwards due to dwindling subscriptions, Briggs left, and George William Curtis became editor.

"The Bell-Tower" appeared in 1855 in no. 32 (August). "Benito Cereno" appeared in three installments in 1855, in no. 34 (October), no. 35 (November), and no. 36 (December).

Melville's submissions for the magazine were well received. Only once was a submission rejected, "The Two Temples", which remained unpublished during Melville's life. Briggs said he rejected it because: "My editorial experience compels me to be very cautious in offending the religious sensibilities of the public, and the moral of the Two Temples would array against us the whole power of the pulpit." Of another story he said: "The only complaint that I have heard about the Encantadas was that it might have been longer."

=== The Piazza Tales ===
In addition to the five stories, Melville wrote an introductory story for which the volume was titled. Scholar Douglas Robillard believes that this served the purpose of making the stories to appear "more closely joined than they actually are."

The contract for the book was signed on 17 March 1856. It was advertised on 5 April as "in press" and should have been available by 15 May—though a copy was deposited for copyright on May 20. The volume was printed by Miller & Holman, Printers and Stereotypers, of New York, as a duodecimo volume of 431 pages, excluding seven pages of advertisements for other products by the same publishers. Biographer Parker observes that to reach that number of pages the book was padded out by leaving excessive white space. The front and back covers were ornamented by a border of rules and rosettes, and the spine displayed the title and the names of the author and publishers stamped in gold. It was priced at $1.00 and 2,500 copies were printed, of which only 1,047 were sold by the end of August; this was not enough to cover expenses. In June, the book was advertised together with another as "TWO GOOD SUMMER BOOKS".

In 1922, three years after the centennial of Melville's birth, the first reissue of the collection appeared as part of the Constable collected edition.

"The Lightning-Rod Man" was chosen for inclusion in William Evans Burton's Cyclopediae of Wit and Humor of 1857, with an illustration by Henry Louis Stephens. No other original illustration for one of his works appeared during Melville's lifetime. Reissues of the book, under a variety of titles, appeared until 1898, making "The Lightning-Rod Man" the one Melville tale to be available throughout his lifetime.

== Contents ==
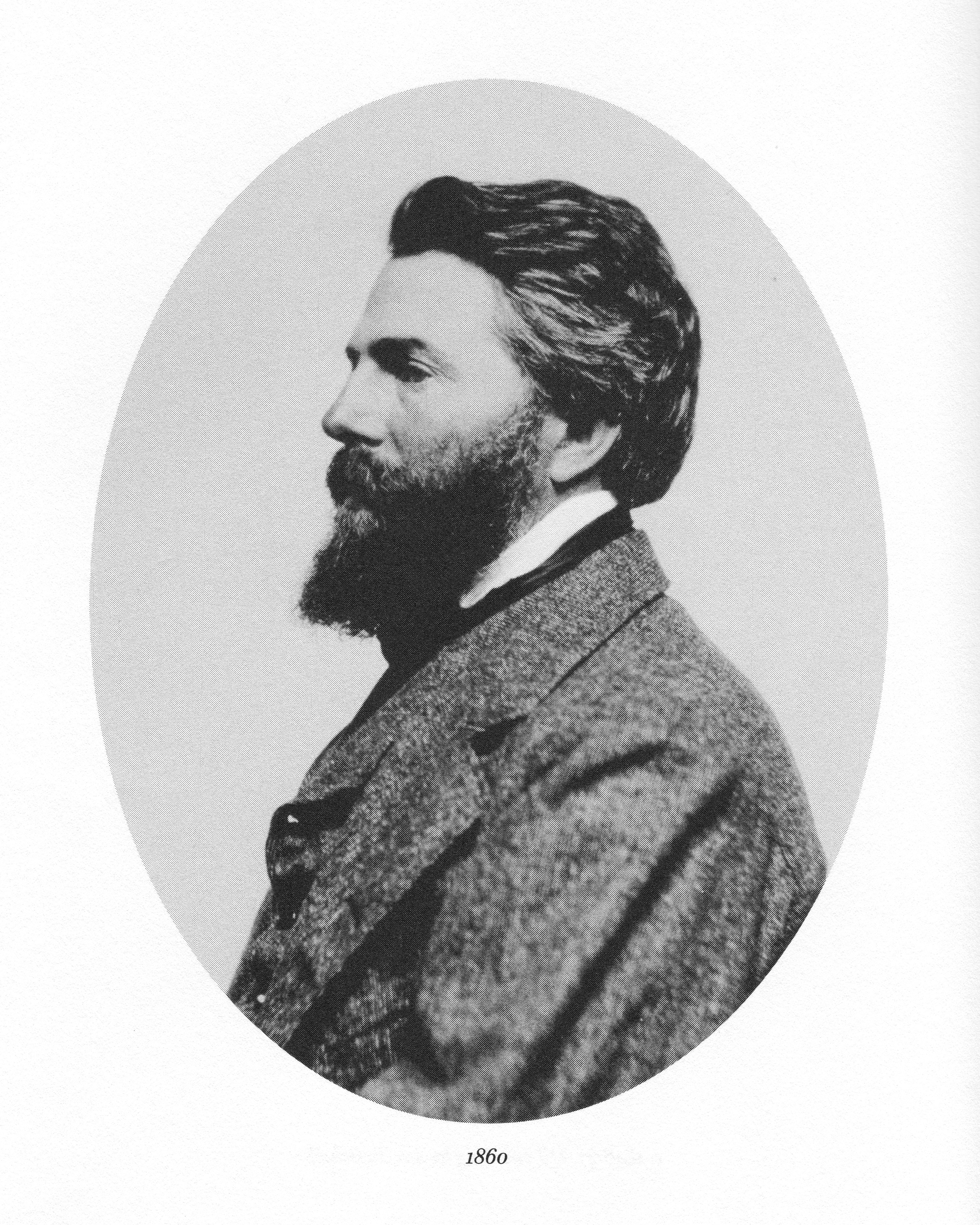
Herman Melville in 1860

1. "The Piazza"
2. "Bartleby, the Scrivener"
3. "Benito Cereno"
4. "The Lightning-Rod Man"
5. "The Encantadas, or Enchanted Isles"
6. "The Bell-Tower"

In "The Piazza", specially written as an introductory story to the volume, the protagonist idealizes a radiant spot on the mountain he looks upon from his piazza. This spot is a house and one day he goes to the cottage, only to find the unhappy girl Marianna, who longs to see the lucky individual who lives in the white house she looks upon from her window. The narrator understands that he himself has been the object of a fantasy not unlike his own, and leaves thinking how all idealism is an illusion. In addition to numerous biblical and mythological references, which Sealts calls "a familiar Melvillean pattern", the story alludes to Emerson's poem "The Problem", Don Quixote, and Paradise Lost, and explicitly namechecks Edmund Spenser. The narrator points to some plays by Shakespeare and, according to Sealts, the girl Marianna should remind the reader of both the Marianna in Shakespeare's Measure for Measure and Alfred Tennyson's "Mariana".

"Bartleby" is set in the Wall Street office of a New York lawyer, who is the narrator of the tale. His new, pale-looking clerk Bartleby refuses to copy documents without giving any other explanation than the repeated mantra: "I would prefer not to." The lawyer cannot bring himself to remove his clerk from his office and finally resorts to moving out himself. Merton Sealts, a leading scholar on Melville's short fiction, notes that in "Bartleby" knowing references to current events occur, and says that the supporting characters of Turkey, Nippers, and the errand boy Ginger Nut "could easily have come from the pen of Dickens, Lamb, or Irving."

The basis for the longest story in the collection, the novella-length "Benito Cereno", is chapter 18 of Amasa Delano's A Narrative of Voyages and Travels. The story is set in 1799 off the coast of Chile, where the Massachusetts captain of merchant ship Bachelor's Delight, Amasa Delano, sees the Spanish slaveship San Dominick in apparent distress. He boards the ship and offers captain Don Benito Cereno his help. Throughout his visit, Cereno is accompanied by the servant Babo, and Delano is witness to the famous shaving scene in the story, in which barber Babo slightly cuts his master. Only at Delano's departure does it become clear that the slaves have seized command of the ship after a revolt and forced the white crew to keep up appearances.

"The Encantadas" consists of ten sketches, "based primarily on recollections of Melville's visit to the Galápagos Islands during his whaling years," elaborated with material from several books, including works by Charles Darwin and Amasa Delano.

The other two stories are shorter pieces. "The Lightning-Rod Man" is based upon an incident occurring in the Berkshires in the fall of 1853, an invasion of salesmen of lightning rods. Sealts considers "The Bell-Tower" to be "the least characteristic of Melville's stories," somewhat resembling Nathaniel Hawthorne and Edgar Allan Poe's work. It is a dark story about an eccentric Italian artist and architect who designs a bell tower and bell.

== Composition ==
As a magazine writer, Melville was a better judge of popular taste than he recently had been as a novelist, Sealts finds. He read contemporary newspapers and magazines, and paid careful attention to what they were carrying. By studying the contents, Melville "learned to pattern his own pieces accordingly, with respect to both form and content." A number of the pieces contain references to persons, places, and events Melville witnessed himself. People whom Melville knew served as the basis for many characters in the short fiction, as some of the reviewers guessed. Never an excelling inventor of original plots, Melville elaborated on his own experiences with material from his reading. Chief among the influences upon his magazine fiction, as recognized by both contemporary reviewers of The Piazza Tales and Melville scholars of the following century, were tales and sketches by such contemporary authors as Washington Irving, Edgar Allan Poe, Nathaniel Hawthorne, Charles Lamb and Charles Dickens, some of whom he had read as early as 1849. These are influences of a general nature and cannot be identified to single works, or as Sealts puts it, Melville "not infrequently followed the lead of others in terms of plotting, characterization, and technique of narration."

As Sealts demonstrates, all of these elements are present in "Bartleby". Melville's knowledge of the Wall Street location is first-hand because his brother Allan was a Wall Street lawyer, the story contains knowing references to current events, and the supporting characters "could easily have come from the pen of Dickens, Lamb or Irving." The idea for the story was suggested to Melville by an 18 February 1853 advertisement for James A. Maitland's The Lawyer's Story in both the New York Times and Tribune that included the complete first chapter of the forthcoming novel, in which a lawyer's increased business makes him hire an extra copying clerk.

The ten sketches of "The Encantadas" go back to Melville's whaling years, during which he visited the Galapagos Islands, supplemented with material from his reading in at least six books of Pacific voyages, including The Voyage of the Beagle by Charles Darwin. A month after the collection was published, Melville's old friend Richard Tobias Greene, on whom Toby in Typee was based, wrote him a letter expressing how the Encantadas sketches "had called up reminiscences of days gone by".

Assuming that "The Piazza" is Melville's own Pittsfield piazza, critic F. O. Matthiessen suggests that the piece must have been suggested by Hawthorne's manse. Sealts regards both Arrowhead, the Pittsfield farm where Melville then lived, and nearby Mount Greylock as inspiring the setting for the story and, like Matthiessen, suggests that Melville was influenced by Hawthorne's method of preparing the reader for the stories in Mosses from an Old Manse through an account of his old manse at Concord.

== Style ==
For Warner Berthoff, Melville's short works of the mid-1850s show a grasp of his subject matter not previously in his possession, not even in Moby-Dick: "a clarity of exposition and a tonic firmness and finality of implication".

John Bryant points to the experimental use of narrative voice in the stories: in addition to third-person narration, Melville makes his fictionalized narrators "less and less reliable." The lawyer-narrator in "Bartleby" is "not so reliable", Bryant finds, but the third-person narrator of "Benito Cereno" represents a "less conspicuous form of unreliability" and precisely because this third-person position seems objective, while in reality Delano's distorted point of view is adhered to.

== Structure ==
In line with other writers of short stories of the time like Poe, Melville's narrative structures stimulate readers to look beyond their initial readings to understand more. This view of "the stories to have a hidden text" has proven to be persuasieve. Writing in the twenty-first century, Bryant makes essentially the same point when he notes that "carefully modulated ironies" are put to such use that "the brightness of sentiment and geniality would be made to reveal its darker edges: deception, sexuality, alienation, and poverty."

For Robert Milder, in the best of the short stories these different levels of meaning are fused "in a vision of tragedy more poignant than Moby-Dick's or Pierre's because it is more keenly responsive to the lived human condition."

== Reception ==
=== Contemporary reviews ===
The collection met with short, cursory reviews only, which Branch attributes to the "general attitude" that the "author of Typee should do something higher and better than Magazine articles," as the New York Times wrote. "The Encantadas" attracted the most attention, probably, Branch suggests, because it reminded reviewers of the author's first two books, listed on the title page.

The first review appeared in the New York Atlas for 25 May, followed by more than thirty others until as late as September. Only two of the thirty-three reviews and notices critic Johannes D. Bergmann read "seem seriously negative." Most of the others were full of praise, especially for "Bartleby," "Benito Cereno," and "The Encantadas." Several reviewers singling out "Bartleby" and "The Bell-Tower" compare the stories to Edgar Allan Poe's work. Sealts saw thirty-seven reviews, five of which were "preponderantly unfavorable," among them the sole British review of the group, which appeared in the London Athenaeum for 26 July. Yet, he said, the reviews showed that the book "manifestly pleased [Melville's] critics as no other work from his pen had done since the appearance of Redburn and White-Jacket in 1849 and 1850."

Most of the contemporary reviews were unsigned, and not all singled out any individual story, but merely described the collection as a whole. On 9 July 1856, the Springfield Republican compared the collection to Hawthorne's best work, "marked by a delicate fancy, a bright and most fruitful imagination, a pure and translucent style and a certain weirdness of conceit." "The legends themselves," wrote the Athenaeum for 26 July, "have a certain wild and ghostly power; but the exaggeration of their teller's manner appears to be on the increase." Also taking the stories together, the United States Democratic Review for September 1856 wrote that "All of them exhibit that peculiar richness of language, descriptive vitality, and splendidly sombre imagination which are the author's characteristics." Praise for Melville's charming style was offered "almost invariably in a tone of affection and respect, without a single known mention of Moby-Dick", Parker observes.

Many reviews echoed that the collection made for excellent summer reading: "Scarcely a pleasanter book for summer reading could be recommended" was a representative phrase, printed in the New York Churchman for 5 June.

=== Later critical history ===
In 1926, during the so-called "Melville Revival," "Benito Cereno" became the first of any of his short fiction to appear in a separate edition when the Nonesuch Press published the Piazza Tales text, illustrated by E. McKnight Kauffer. The story is also the first of the short works to which a scholarly publication was devoted: Harold H. Scudder's 1928 study of Melville's use of his major source, Amasa Delano's 1817 A Narrative of Voyages and Travels, in the Northern and Southern Hemispheres: Comprising Three Voyages Round the World; Together with a Voyage of Survey and Discovery, in the Pacific Ocean and Oriental Islands.

After surveying scholarship and criticism on the tales up to the 1980s, Sealts observed that, of the six Piazza Tales, "Benito Cereno" and "The Encantadas" have attracted the most attention from the beginning of Melville studies, while "Bartleby" and "The Piazza" increasingly captured scholarly attention from the 1920s onward. Sealts also found that interpretations of the short stories have, over time, shifted their focus from metaphysical to epistemological concerns and from general ethical considerations to "more immediate political and social implications," such as reading "Benito Cereno" in the context of the heated debate over slavery leading up to the Civil War. Many scholarly studies have looked at how Melville drew inspiration from: his own observation of contemporary life, his knowledge of literature, and his familiarity with more specialized sources, including travelogues of the Pacific and articles in periodicals.

Scholar Robert Milder recognized a new development in Melville's writing: prompted by the compromise that writing stories for magazines inevitably entails, Melville now "mastered the art of covert insinuation, managing his ironic or unreliable narrators with such subtlety that readers still dispute which (if any) of the narrators voice his own opinions and which are objects of satire or detached psychological interest." Milder describes the stories as predominantly comic, depicting failure, compromise, and misery, with metaphysical concerns almost entirely absent.

Biographer Andrew Delbanco cites "The Bell-Tower" as a story that "merited the caution" of Curtis not to accept Melville's submissions for Putnam's too easily.
