= Tuareg (novel) =

1980 novel by Alberto Vázquez-Figueroa

- First edition
- Author: Alberto Vázquez-Figueroa
- Language: Spanish
- Series: The Tuareg Dilogy
- Genre: Thriller novel
- Publisher: Goldmann Wilhelm GmbH
- Publication date: 1980
- Publication place: Spain
- Media type: Print, e-book, audiobook
- ISBN: 978-1846941924
- Followed by: Eyes of Tuareg

Tuareg (ISBN 184694192X) is a thriller novel written by Spanish author Alberto Vázquez-Figueroa. This novel was his most critically and commercially successful, with global sales in excess of 5,000,000 copies. It was adapted into a 1984 movie starring Mark Harmon, Tuareg – The Desert Warrior.

This is the first book in the Tuareg trilogy, followed by Los Ojos del Tuareg and El Último Tuareg.

== Plot ==
One day, an old man and a boy appear in Gacel Shayah's camp in the Sahara. He, a noble inmouchar observing the millennial tradition of the desert, shelters the travelers. But he fails to protect them. People in dusty military uniforms arrive and violate the ancient hospitality law. They kill the boy and take the old man away. Gasel Shayah remembers the great commandment of the Tuareg people: your guest is under your protection. Therefore, he has to seek vengeance.
