= Tuareg – The Desert Warrior =

Tuareg – The Desert Warrior aka Tuareg – Il guerriero del deserto
- Directed by: Enzo G. Castellari
- Based on: Tuareg by Alberto Vázquez-Figueroa
- Starring: Mark Harmon
- Cinematography: John Cabrera
- Music by: Riz Ortolani
- Release date: 1984
- Running time: 97 minutes
- Countries: Spain, Italy

Tuareg – Il guerriero del deserto (internationally released as Tuareg – The Desert Warrior and Desert Warrior) is a 1984 Spanish-Italian adventure-action film directed by Enzo G. Castellari.

The film is based on a novel with the same name written by Alberto Vázquez-Figueroa. It represents the first film released by home video distribution company Mirisch.

== Cast ==
- Mark Harmon: Gacel Sayah
- Luis Prendes: Abdul El Kabir
- Ritza Brown: Gacel's Wife
- Aldo Sambrell: Sgt. Malick
- Paolo Malco: Captain Razman
- Antonio Sabàto: The Captain
- Giovanni Cianfriglia: Mubarak
