= Patrick Watkins (sailor) =

19th-century Irish sailor

- Born: Ireland
- Occupation: Sailor
- Known for: First permanent resident of Galápagos Islands

Patrick Watkins was an Irish sailor. He was the first permanent resident on the Galápagos Islands after he became marooned on Floreana Island in 1807. Very little is known of his life before he became marooned or of his life after he was jailed in Paita, Peru.

== Early life ==
Watkins was a sailor from Ireland.

== Marooning on Floreana ==
In 1807, Watkins became marooned on Floreana Island. It is unknown if he was forcibly left there or if he did so voluntarily. As a result, he became the first known permanent resident of the Galápagos Islands.

Over the next two years, Watkins survived by hunting, growing vegetables on a two-acre plot in a small valley and trading with passing ships. He became known for trading his vegetables for rum with passing vessels and was reputedly drunk for most of his stay on the island.

He eventually stole a longboat from a whaling ship, impressing five of its crew as his "slaves", and navigating to Guayaquil, Ecuador. Watkins was the only one of the six to survive the journey.

== Later life ==
Watkins moved to Paita, Peru where he seduced a woman to return to the Galápagos Islands with him. However, he was arrested and jailed by the local police before he could do so. Nothing is known of what happened to him after he was jailed.

== Legacy ==
American naval officer David Porter visited Floreana Island six years after Watkins left. He described the "miserable hut" Watkins had built in his journal, adding that Watkins's image "was the most dreadful that can be imagined", with ragged clothes that left him half-naked, burnt skin, a matted red beard and hair. Porter also said that Watkins "struck everyone with horror" because he was "so wild and savage in his manner".

Spanish novelist Alberto Vázquez-Figueroa based his 1982 novel Iguana on the case of Watkins. Later, the novel was cinematized by American director Monte Hellman in 1988.

=== Bibliography ===
- Jackson, Michael Hume (1993), Galapagos: A Natural History, Calgary: University of Calgary Press
