= Alberto Vázquez-Figueroa =

Spanish novelist, inventor and industrialist

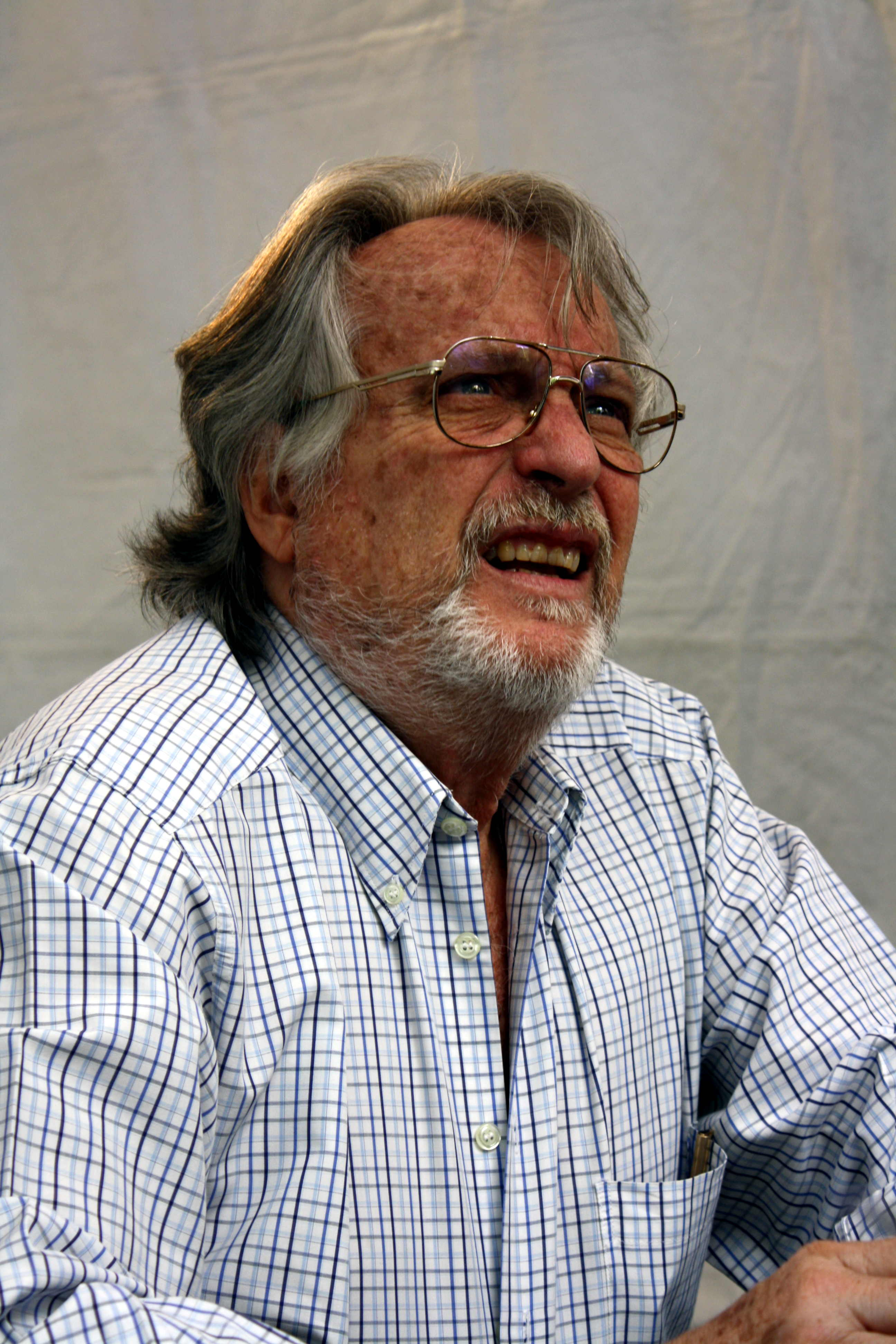
- Álberto Vázquez-Figueroa in Barcelona in 2009
- Born: Alberto Vázquez-Figueroa; 11 November 1936 (age 89); Santa Cruz de Tenerife, Canary Islands
- Education: Escuela Oficial de Periodismo, Madrid
- Occupations: Fiction writer, journalist, inventor, screenwriter, film director
- Writing career
- Period: 1953–present
- Notable work: Tuareg (1980)
- Notable awards: Historical Novel Prize Alfonso X El Sabio (2010)

Alberto Vázquez-Figueroa (born 11 October 1936 in Santa Cruz de Tenerife, Canary Islands) is a Spanish novelist, inventor and industrialist. His novels have sold over 25 million copies worldwide. Vázquez-Figueroa is the owner of A.V.F.S.L, a desalination company that uses a method of desalination by pressure that he invented.

== Biography ==
Vázquez-Figueroa and his family fled from the Canary Islands to Africa during the Spanish Civil War. Since his youth, he has visited the Sahara and written about the culture of the desert region. He also worked as a instructor of submarine and diving techniques on oceanologist Jacques Cousteau's vessel, "Cruz del Sur." He attended the studios of the Escuela Oficial de Periodismo de Madrid in a part of 1962 and worked in the Destino specials. He was a war correspondent in La Vanguardia, for TVE (Televisión Española) and for the program A toda plana with de la Cuadra Salcedo and Silva. As a correspondent, he documented revolutionary wars in countries such as Bolivia, the Dominican Republic and Guatemala.

He later wrote his first novel, Arena y viento (Sand and Wind), and in 1975, he published as many as 14 to 15 novellas such as Ébano. His other works include Tuareg, Ébano, and El perro as well as the sagas Cienfuegos, Bora Bora, Manaos and Piratas. His novel Tuareg was adapted into a film in 1984 by director Enzo G. Castellari. His novel Iguana was cinematized in 1988 by Monte Hellman. His novel Garoé, which is the name of a sacred tree in the Canary Islands, won the 2010 Historical Novel Prize Alfonso X El Sabio, valued at €100,000. He has also published an autobiography entitled Anaconda.

He is also a screenwriter and film director and has made such films as Red Gold.

== Literature ==
- Tuareg (1980)
- Tras las huellas de Alec (1971)
- Serie Cienfuegos
  - Cienfuegos (1987)
  - Caribes (Caribs)
  - Saud el Leopardo (2009)
  - Azabache
  - Montenegro
  - Brazofuerte
  - Xaraguá
  - Tierra de bisontes (Land of the bisons)
- Olvidar Machu-Picchu (1983)
- Manaos
- Viracocha
- Anaconda
- Nuevos dioses
- El agua prometida
- La ordalía del veneno
- Marea negra
- Fuerteventura
- Serie Océano (Ocean Series):
  - Isla de Lobos (a.k.a. Océano)
  - Yaiza
  - Maradentro
- Serie Piratas (Pirate Series):
  - Piratas (1996)
  - Negreros
  - Leon Bocanegra
- Tiempo de conquistadores (2000)
- Un mundo mejor (2002)
- El señor de las tinieblas
- El anillo verde
- Delfines (Dolphins)
- La ruta de Orellana
- La Iguana
- Ícaro
- Bora Bora
- Ébano (1974)
- ¡Panamá, Panamá!
- Tierra virgen. La destrucción del Amazonas
- El inca (The Inca)
- Los ojos del tuareg (2000)
- Vendaval
- Ciudadano Max
- África llora
- Marfil
- Sicario
- Palmira
- ¿Quién mató al embajador?
- Como un perro rabioso (a.k.a. El perro)
- Matar a Gadafi (1997)
- Vivir del viento
- El rey leproso (2005)
- Bajo siete mares
- Por mil millones de dólares (2007)
- Coltan (2008)

== Filmography ==
- El perro, directed by Antonio Isasi-Isasmendi (1977, based on the novel El perro)
- Oro rojo, directed by Alberto Vázquez-Figueroa (1978)
- Ashanti, directed by Richard Fleischer (1979, based on the novel Ébano)
- Manaos, directed by Alberto Vázquez-Figueroa (1979, based on the novel Manaos)
- Last Harem, directed by Sergio Garrone (1981, based on the novel El último harén)
- Tuareg – The Desert Warrior, directed by Enzo G. Castellari (1984, based on the novel Tuareg)
- Crystal Heart, directed by Gil Bettman (1986)
- Iguana, directed by Monte Hellman (1988, based on the novel Iguana)
- Ocean, miniseries (1989)
- Rottweiler, directed by Brian Yuzna (2004, based on the novel El perro)
