= Gary Whitehead =

American poet (born 1965)

Gary Joseph Whitehead (born March 23, 1965, in Pawtucket, Rhode Island) is an American poet and educator. He is the author of five books of poetry: Seeing Double (Terrapin Books, 2026), Strange What Rises (Terrapin Books, 2019), A Glossary of Chickens (Princeton University Press, 2013), Measuring Cubits while the Thunder Claps (David Robert Books, 2008), and The Velocity of Dust (Salmon Poetry, 2004). His work has appeared in journals, magazines and newspapers and most notably in The New Yorker and Poetry.

His awards include a New York Foundation for the Arts Individual Artist Fellowship in Poetry, a Pearl Hogrefe Fellowship at Iowa State University, the Anne Halley Prize from The Massachusetts Review, and a Princeton University Distinguished Secondary School Teaching Award in 2003. In 2023, he was named Bergen County Teacher of the Year. He has held artist residencies at Blue Mountain Center, Mesa Refuge, Marble House Project, and the Heinrich Böll cottage in Ireland. In 2004, he was the recipient of the PEN Northwest Margery Davis Boyden Wilderness Writing Residency Award, and spent April though October, 2005 in a secluded cabin in the wilderness of southwestern Oregon.

Well known for his poetry, Whitehead is also a crossword constructor whose puzzles have appeared in The New York Sun, USA Today, the Los Angeles Times, and The New York Times. He taught English and creative writing for 29 years at the National Blue Ribbon School of Tenafly High School in Tenafly, New Jersey before retiring in 2026.

== Bibliography ==
=== Poetry ===
Collections

- Seeing Double (Terrapin Books, 2026)
- Strange What Rises (Terrapin Books, 2019)
- A Glossary of Chickens (Princeton University Press, 2013)
- Measuring Cubits while the Thunder Claps (David Robert Books, 2008)
- The Velocity of Dust (Salmon Poetry, 2004)

List of poems published in The New Yorker:

Title	Year	First published	Reprinted/collected
Pretend it was just the wind	2019	Whitehead, Gary J. (January 7, 2019). "Pretend it was just the wind". The New Yorker. Vol. 94, no. 43. p. 37.	
Making love in the kitchen	2014	Whitehead, Gary J. (March 10, 2014). "Making love in the kitchen". The New Yorker. Vol. 90, no. 3. p. 58.	
Soldier course	2013	Whitehead, Gary J. (April 8, 2013). "Soldier course". The New Yorker. Vol. 89, no. 8. p. 42.	
Lot's wife	2011	Whitehead, Gary J. (January 2, 2012). "Lot's wife". The New Yorker. Vol. 87, no. 42. p. 60	
A glossary of chickens	2010	Whitehead, Gary (May 24, 2010). "A glossary of chickens". The New Yorker. Vol. 86, no. 14. p. 39.	
