= History of printing =

Printing emerged as early as the 4th millennium BCE in the form of cylinder seals used by the Proto-Elamite and Sumerian civilizations to certify documents written on clay tablets. Other early forms include block seals, hammered coinage, pottery imprints, and cloth printing. Initially a method of printing patterns on cloth such as silk, woodblock printing for texts on paper originated in Tang China by the 7th century, to the spread of book production and woodblock printing in other parts of Asia such as Korea and Japan. The Chinese Buddhist Diamond Sutra, printed by woodblock on 11 May 868, is the earliest known printed book with a precise publishing date. Movable type was invented in China during the 11th century by the Song dynasty artisan Bi Sheng, but it received limited use compared to woodblock printing. However, the use of copper movable types was documented in a Song-era book from 1193, and the earliest printed paper money using movable metal type to print the identifying codes were made in 1161. The technology also spread outside China, with the oldest extant printed book using metal movable type being the Jikji, printed in Korea in 1377 during the Goryeo era.

Woodblock printing was also used in Europe until the mid-15th century. Late medieval German inventor Johannes Gutenberg created the first printing press based on previously known mechanical presses and a process for mass-producing metal type. By the end of the 15th century, his invention and widescale circulation of the Gutenberg Bible became responsible for a burgeoning economical book publishing industry spreading globally across Renaissance Europe and eventually among the colonial publishers and printers that emerged in the British American colonies. This industry enabled the communication of ideas and the sharing of knowledge on an unprecedented scale, leading to the global spread of the printing press during the early modern period. Alongside the development of text printing, new and lower-cost methods of image reproduction were developed, including lithography, screen printing and photocopying.

== Stencil ==
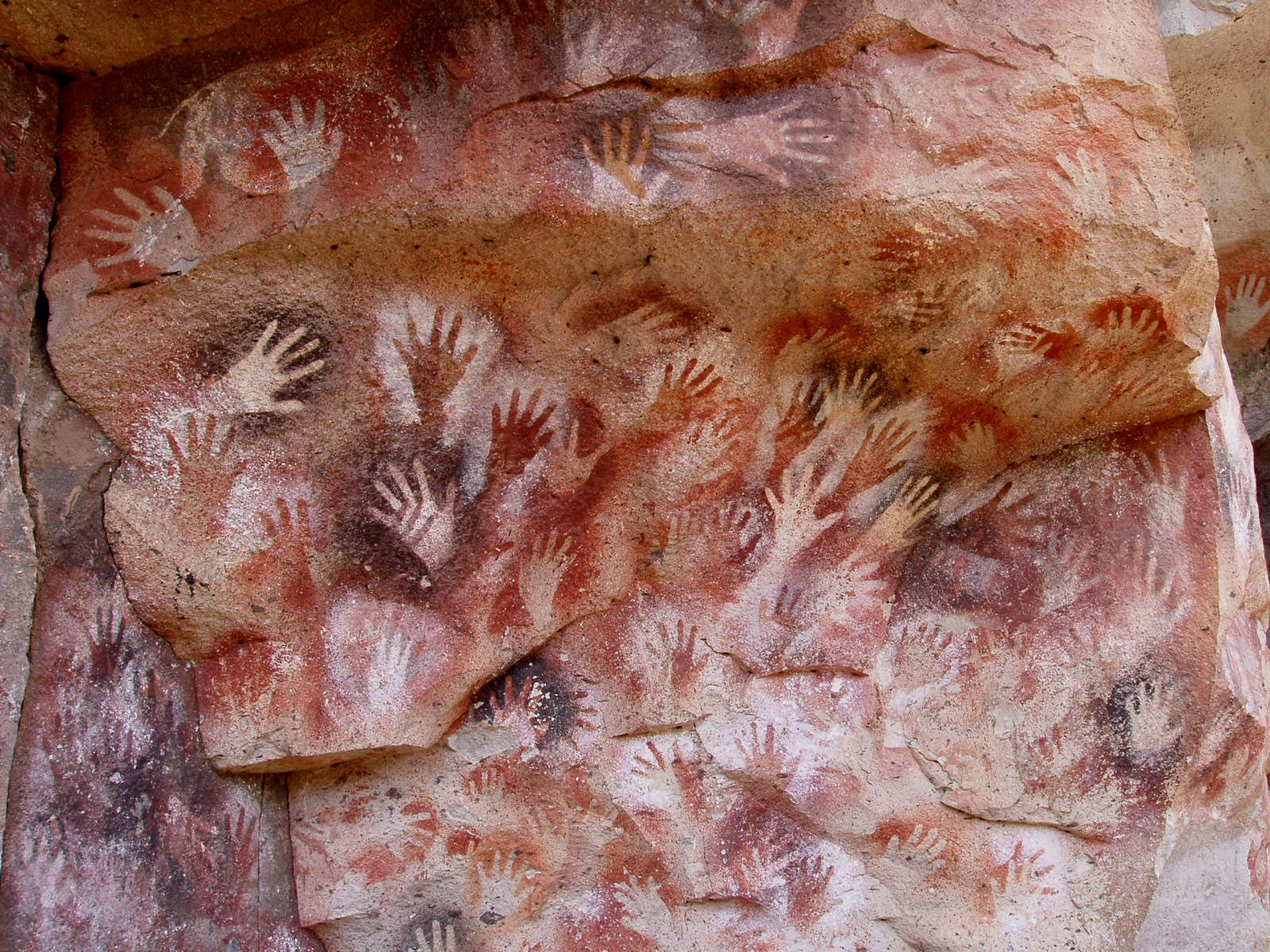
Handprints at the Cueva de las Manos in Santa Cruz Province, Argentina, created c. 7300 BCE

Hand stencils, made by blowing pigment over a hand held against a wall, have been found in Asia and Europe dating from over 35,000 years ago, and later prehistoric dates in other continents. Stencils may have been used to colour cloth for a very long time; the technique probably reached its peak of sophistication in katazome and other techniques used on silks for clothes during the Edo period in Japan. In Europe, from about 1450 they were commonly used to colour old master prints printed in black and white, usually woodcuts. This was especially the case with playing-cards, which continued to be coloured by stencil long after most other subjects for prints were left in black and white. Stencils were used for mass publications, as the type did not have to be hand-written.

== Brick stamps ==
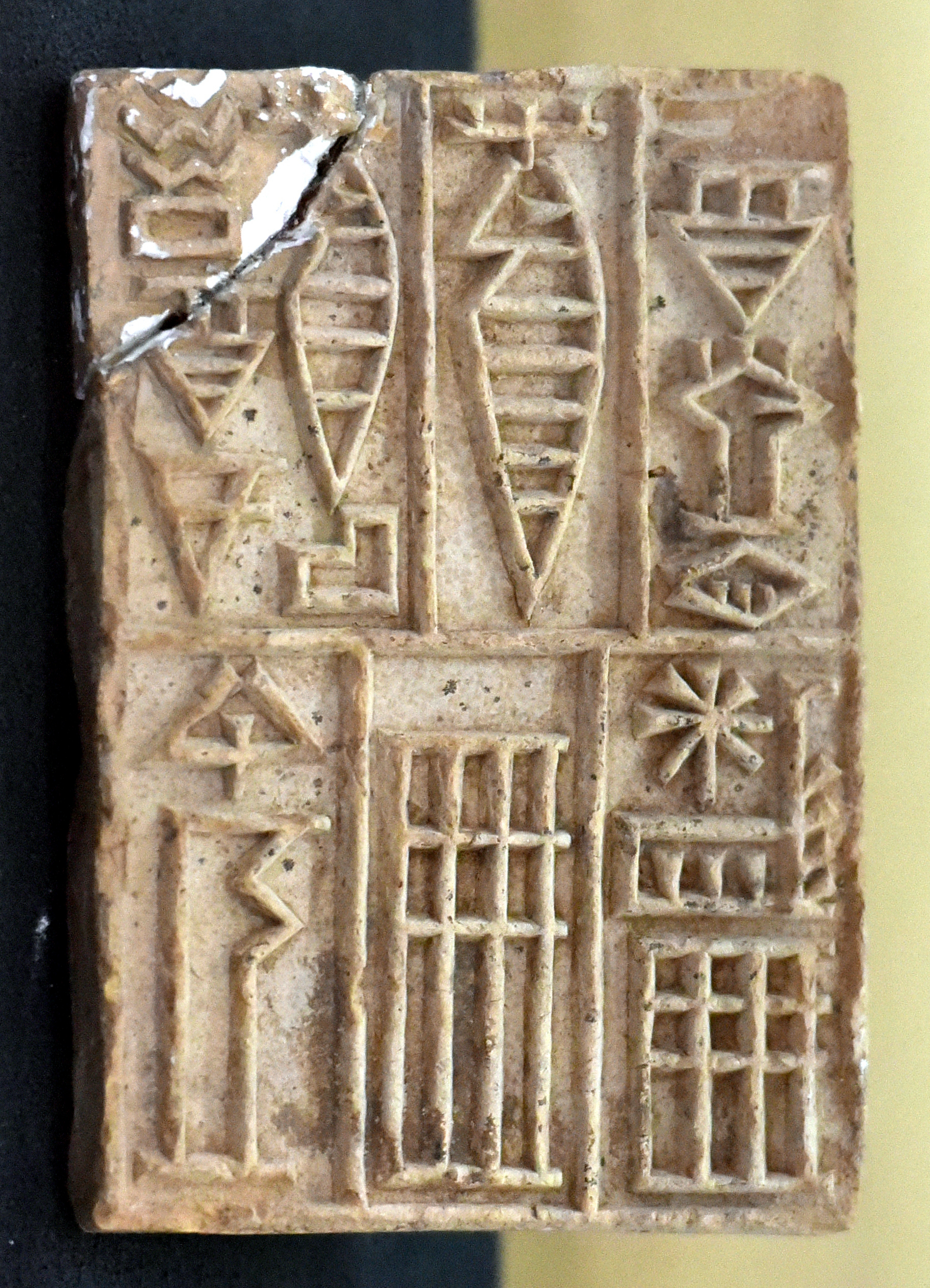
Brick stamp of Shar-Kali-Sharri, National Museum of Iraq

Brick stamps were used by the Akkadian Empire (2334–2154 BCE) in Mesopotamia in order to dedicate the bricks used in temples, by inscribing the name of the ruler. A typical brick stamp of the ruler Naram-Sin for example would read "Naram-sin builder, the temple of Goddess Inanna". Not all the bricks of a temple would be imprinted in this way, but only several of them, enough to make clear who built the temple and for which god. The reason for using stamps was to replace the slow and cumbersome process of inscribing the bricks by hand.

In Indian Buddhism, great merit is thought to accrue from copying and preserving texts. Asanga, the 4th-century master listed the copying of scripture as the first of ten essential religious practices. The importance of perpetuating texts is set out with special force in the longer Sukhāvatīvyūha Sūtra, which urges the devout not only to hear, learn, remember and study the text but to obtain a good copy and to preserve it. This "cult of the book" led to techniques for reproducing texts in great numbers, especially the short prayers or charms known as dhāraṇīs. Stamps were carved for printing these prayers on clay tablets from at least the 7th century, the date of the oldest surviving examples.

== Seals ==
In China, seals have been used since at least the Shang dynasty (c. 1600 – c. 1046 BCE. In the Western Zhou, sets of seal stamps were encased in blocks of type and used on clay moulds for casting bronzes. By the end of the 3rd century BCE, seals were also used for printing on pottery. In the Northern dynasties textual sources contain references to wooden seals with up to 120 characters.

The seals had a religious element to them. Taoists used seals as healing devices by impressing therapeutic characters onto the flesh of sick people. They were also used to stamp food, creating a talismanic character to ward off disease. The first evidence of these practices appeared under a Buddhist context in the mid-5th century. Centuries later, seals were used to create hundreds of Buddha images.

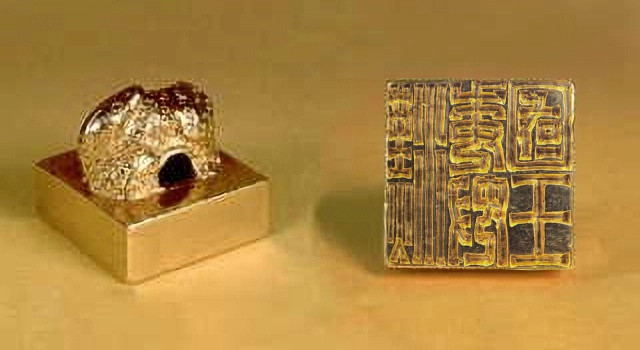
The King of Na gold seal, bestowed by Emperor Guangwu of Han to Wana (Yayoi Japan) in 57 CE

In the West the practice of sealing documents with an impressed personal or official insignia, typically from a worn signet ring, became established under the Roman Empire, and continued through the Byzantine and Holy Roman empires, into the 19th century, when a wet signature became customary.

... there were some major diversities which led perhaps to development in different directions. Chinese seals were mostly made in a square or rectangular shape with a flat base, inscribed with characters in reverse, and used to stamp on paper. These characteristics are very close to those of block printing. Although the surface and inscriptions of most seals were small or limited, some wooden seals were as large as printing blocks and were inscribed with texts more than one hundred characters long. The seals of the West, on the other hand, were cylindrical or scaraboid, round or oval, and inscribed primarily with pictures or designs and only occasionally with writing. The cylindrical seals used to roll over clay had no potential to develop into a printing surface.

— Tsien Tsuen-hsuin

== Stone, clay and bronze blocks ==
Stone and bronze blocks have been used to print fabric. Archaeological evidence of them has been unearthed at Mawangdui and in the tomb of the King of Nanyue, while block printed fabrics have been discovered at Mashan Zhuanchang in Jiangling, Hubei.

Pliny the Elder described clay block printing of textiles in 1st-century CE Egypt, with extant Egyptian, Roman, Byzantine, Ukrainian, and Russian examples known, dating from the 4th century CE. In the 4th century the practice of creating paper rubbings of stone carvings such as calligraphic models and texts took hold in East Asia. Among the earliest evidence of this is a stone inscription cut in mirror image from the early 6th century.

== Woodblock printing ==
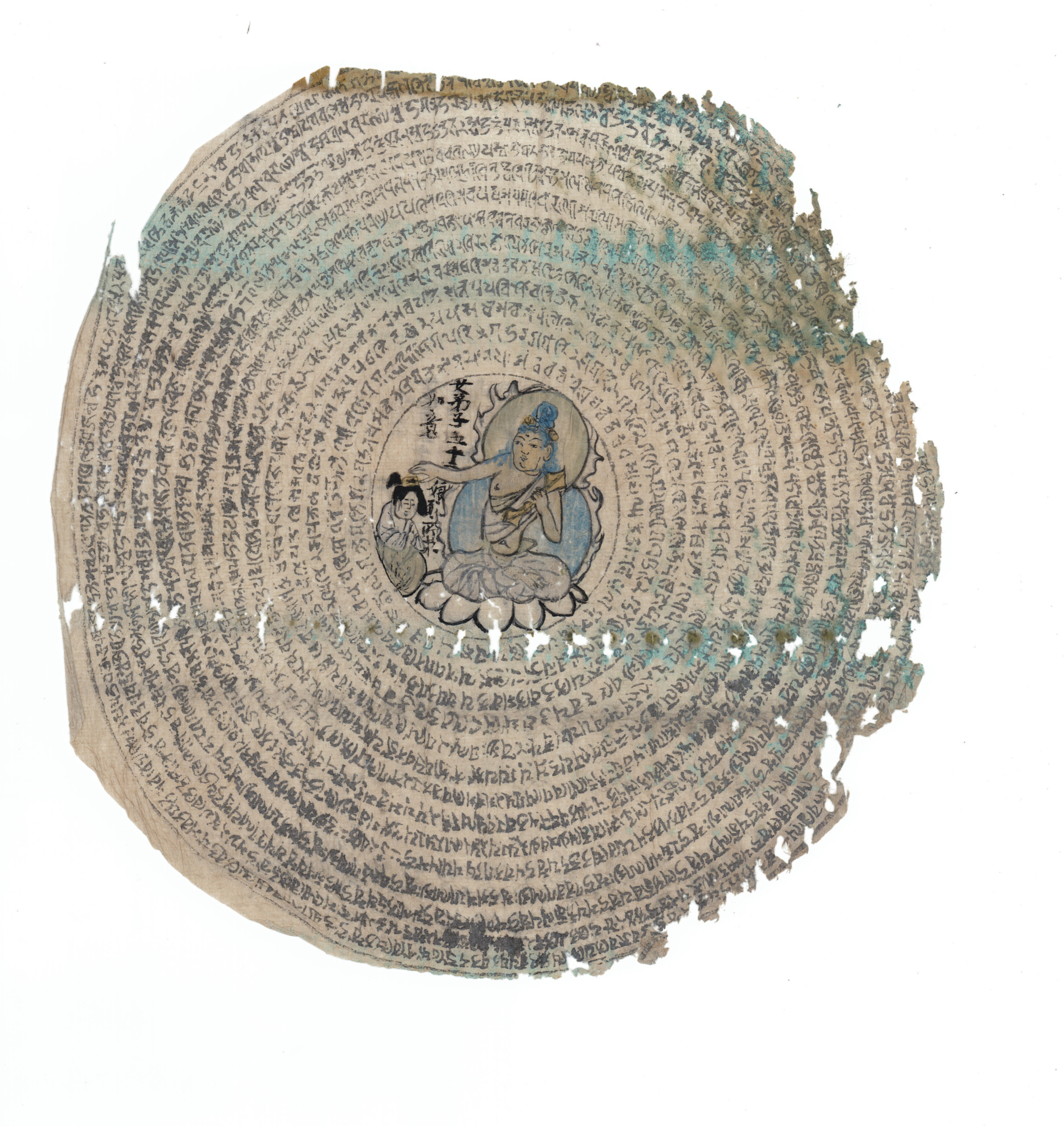
A fragment of a dharani print in Sanskrit and Chinese, c. 650–670, Tang dynasty

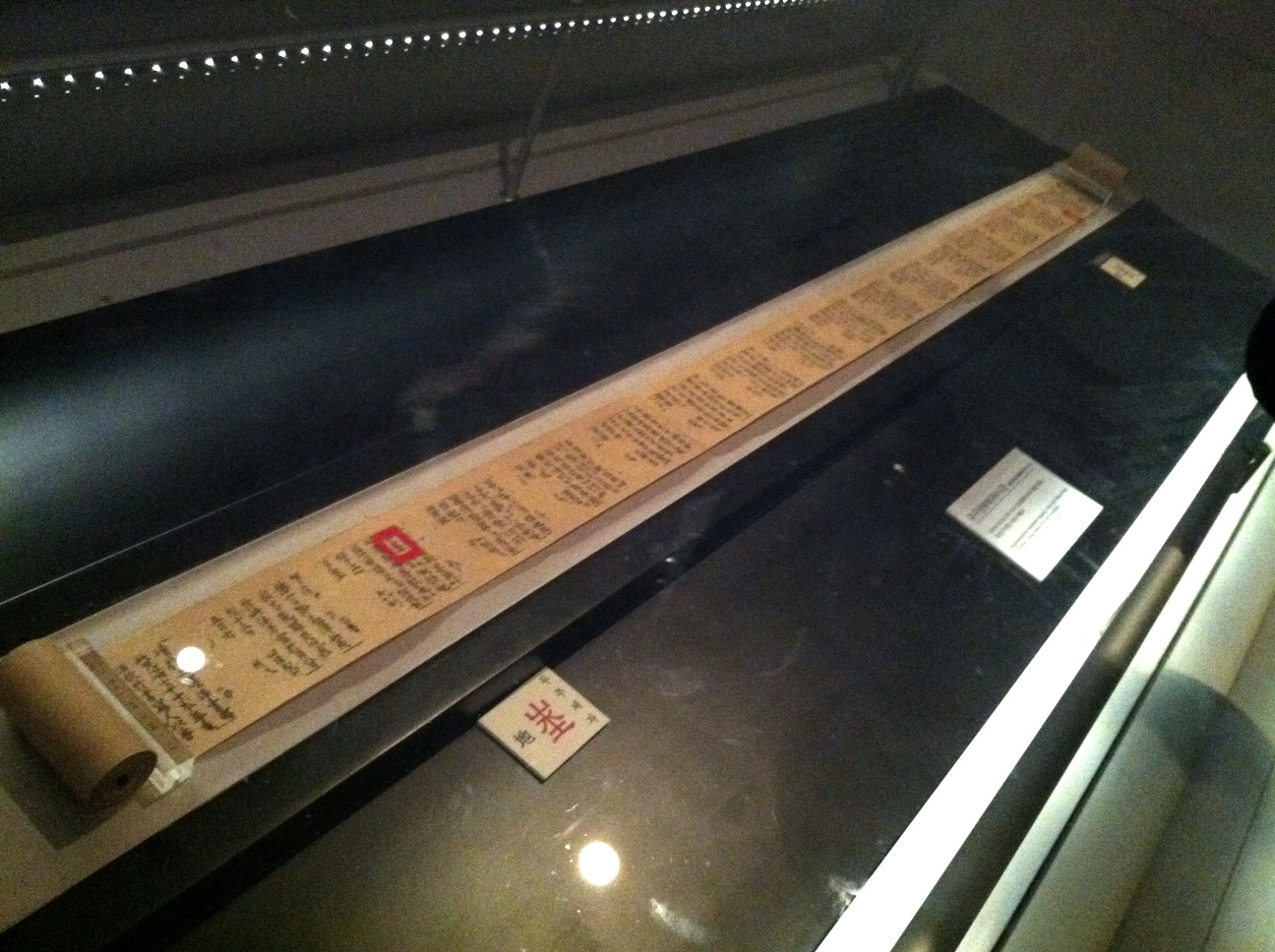
Replica of The Great Dharani Sutra, the oldest printed text in Korea, c. 704–751

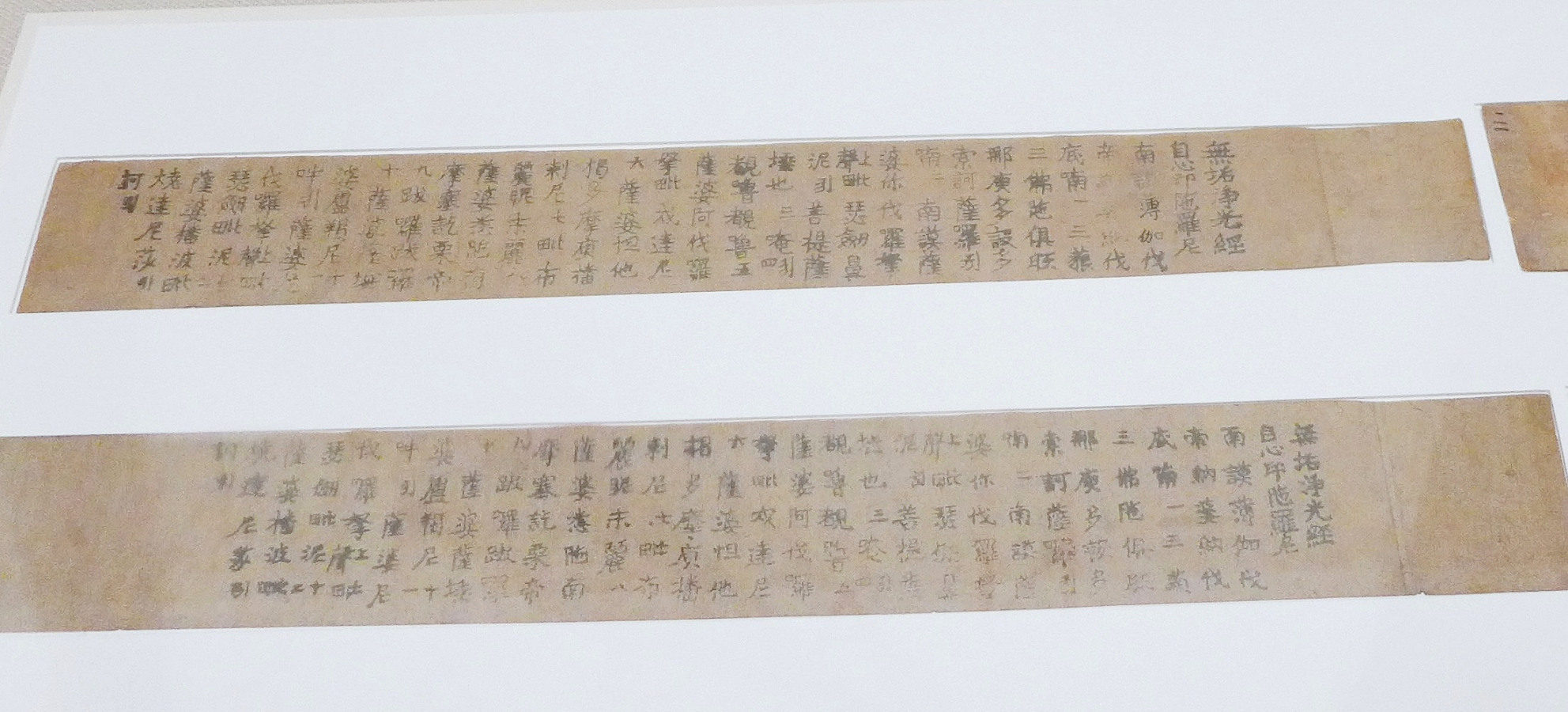
The Hyakumantō Darani, the oldest printed text in Japan, c. 770

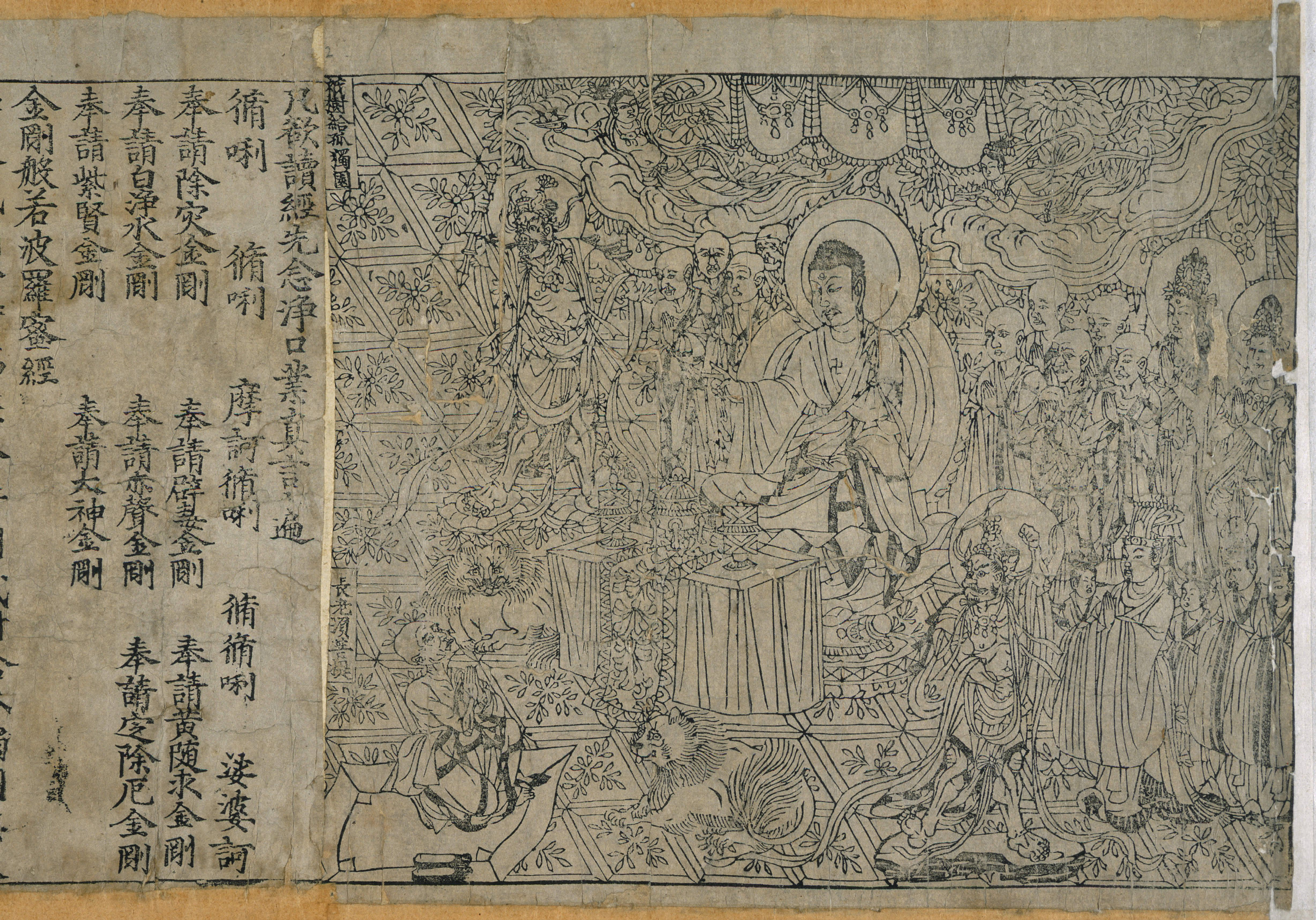
The frontispiece of the Tang-era Diamond Sutra, the earliest extant printed text bearing a date of production, 868 (British Library)

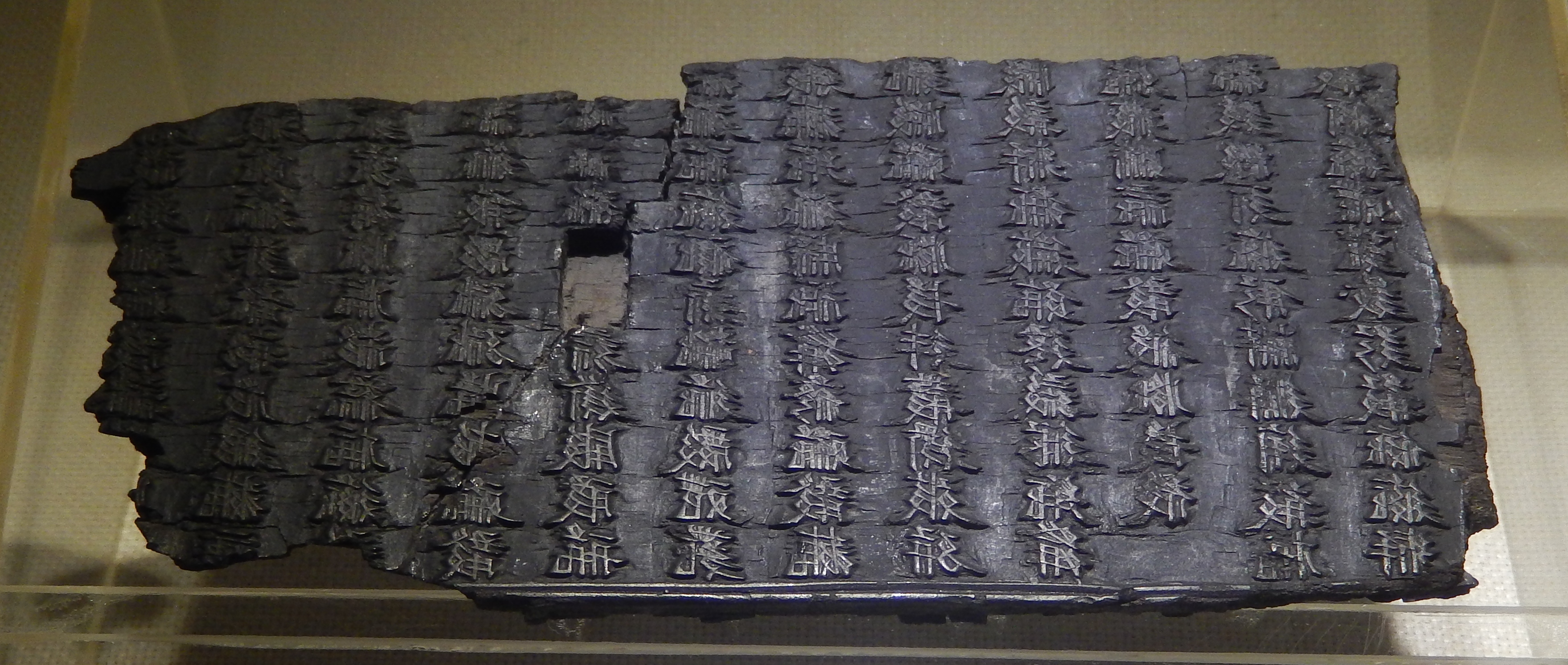
Piece of a Western Xia (1038–1277) wooden printing block for a Buddhist text written in Tangut script. Discovered in 1990 in the Hongfo Pagoda in Helan County, Ningxia.

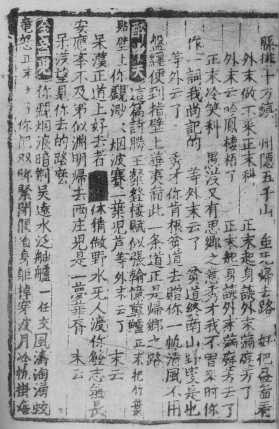
Yuan dynasty woodblocks edition of a Chinese play

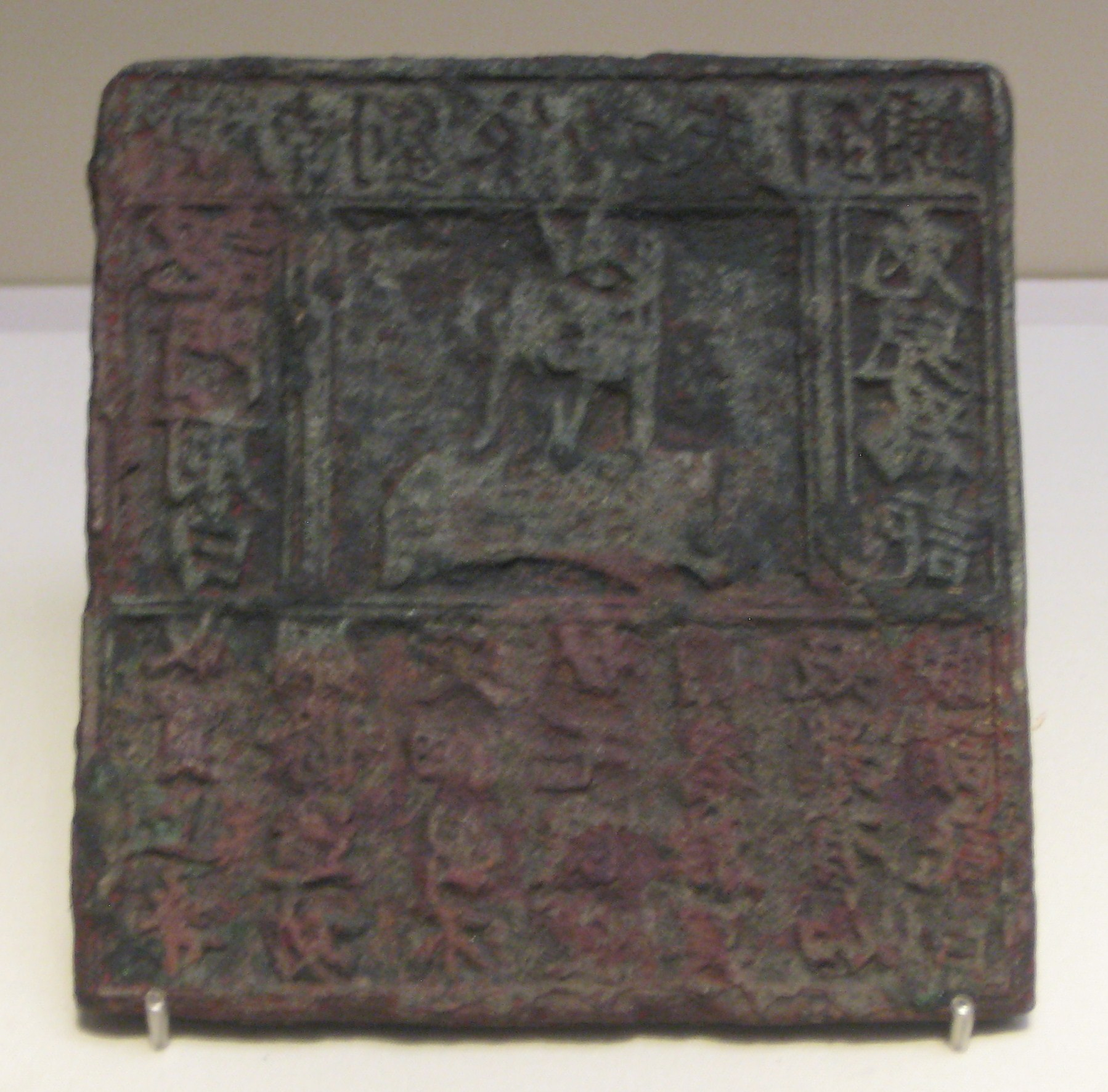
Song dynasty (960–1279) bronze plate advertising print for the Liu family needle shop at Jinan. Earliest extant print advertisement.

Woodblock printing, known as xylography today, was the first method of printing applied to a paper medium. It became widely used throughout East Asia both as a method for printing on textiles and later, under the influence of Buddhism, on paper. As a method of printing on cloth, the earliest surviving examples from China date to the Han dynasty (before 220 CE). Ukiyo-e is the best known type of Japanese woodblock art print. Most European uses of the technique on paper are covered by the term woodcut, except for the block books produced mainly in the 15th century.

=== Legendary origins ===
According to the Book of the Southern Qi, in the 480s, a man named Gong Xuanyi (龔玄宜) styled himself Gong the Sage and "said that a supernatural being had given him a 'jade seal jade block writing', which did not require a brush: one blew on the paper and characters formed." He then used his powers to mystify a local governor. Eventually he was dealt with by the governor's successor, who presumably executed Gong. Timothy Hugh Barrett postulates that Gong's magical jade block was actually a printing device, and Gong was one of the first printers, if not the first. The semi-mythical record of him therefore describes his usage of the printing process to deliberately bewilder onlookers and create an image of mysticism around himself.

=== East Asia ===
Inscribed seals made of metal or stone, especially jade, and inscribed stone tablets probably provided inspiration for the invention of printing. Copies of classical texts on tablets were erected in a public place in Luoyang during the Han dynasty for scholars and students to copy. The Suishu jingjizhi, the blibography of the official history of the Sui dynasty, includes several ink-squeeze rubbings, believed to have led to the early duplication of texts that inspired printing. A stone inscription cut in reverse dating from the first half of the 6th century implies that it may have been a large printing block.

The rise of printing was greatly influenced by Mahayana Buddhism. According to Mahayana beliefs, religious texts hold intrinsic value for carrying the Buddha's word, and act as talismanic objects containing sacred power capable of warding off evil spirits. By copying and preserving these texts, Buddhists could accrue personal merit. As a consequence the idea of printing and its advantages in replicating texts quickly became apparent to Buddhists. By the 7th century, they were using woodblocks to create apotropaic documents. These Buddhist texts were printed specifically as ritual items, and were not widely circulated or meant for public consumption. Instead they were buried in consecrated ground. The earliest extant example of this type of printed matter is a fragment of a dhāraṇī (Buddhist spell) miniature scroll written in Sanskrit unearthed in a tomb in Xi'an. It is called the Great spell of unsullied pure light (Wugou jingguang da tuoluoni jing 無垢淨光大陀羅尼經) and was printed using woodblock during the Tang dynasty, c. 650–670. Radiocarbon dating by the University of Arizona confirmed that the material was likely produced sometime between 618 and 770. A similar piece, a copy of the Lotus Sutra, was also discovered and dated to 690 to 699. This coincides with the reign of Wu Zetian, during which the Longer Sukhāvatīvyūha Sūtra, which advocates the practice of printing apotropaic and merit-making texts and images, was translated by Chinese monks. From 658 to 663, Xuanzang printed one million copies of the image of Puxian Pusa to distribute to Buddhist devotees.

Evidence of woodblock printing appeared in Korea and Japan soon afterward. The Great Dharani Sutra was discovered at Bulguksa, South Korea in 1966 and dated between 704 and 751 in the Later Silla era. The document is printed on a 8 cm × 630 cm (3 in × 248 in) mulberry paper scroll. A dhāraṇī sutra was printed in Japan c. 770. One million copies of the sutra, along with other prayers, were ordered to be produced by Empress Shōtoku. As each copy was then stored in a tiny wooden pagoda, the copies are together known as the Hyakumantō Darani.

The oldest extant evidence of woodblock prints created for the purpose of reading are portions of the Lotus Sutra discovered at Turpan in 1906. They have been dated to the reign of Wu Zetian (690 to 705) using character form recognition. The oldest text containing a specific date of printing was discovered in the Mogao Caves of Dunhuang in 1907 by Aurel Stein. This copy of the Diamond Sutra is 14 ft (4.3 m) long and contains a colophon at the inner end, which reads: "Reverently [caused to be] made for universal free distribution by Wang Jie on behalf of his two parents on the 13th of the 4th moon of the 9th year of Xiantong" – i.e., 11 May 868. It is considered the world's oldest securely-dated woodblock scroll. The Diamond Sutra was closely followed by the earliest extant printed almanac, the Qianfu sinian lishu (乾符四年曆書), dated to 877. From 932 to 955 the Twelve Classics and an assortment of other texts were printed.

During the Song dynasty, the directorate of education and other agencies used these block prints to disseminate their standardized versions of the Classics. Other disseminated works include the Histories, philosophical works, encyclopedias, collections, and books on medicine and the art of war. In the state of Wuyue, Qian Chu published the dharani-sutra Baoqieyin tuoluonijing in 956, 965, and 975. Each purportedly in the form of 84,000 miniature scrolls. A copy of the 956 edition was reprinted in Korea in 1007. In 971 work began on the complete Tripiṭaka in Chengdu. It took 10 years to finish the 130,000 blocks needed to print the text. The finished product, the Sichuan edition of the Kaibao Canon, also known as the Kaibao Tripitaka, was printed in 983. During the Song dynasty, the three major centers of printing were Hangzhou, Jianyang, and Chengdu.

Carvers tended to congregate in centers of book production. By the mid-thirteenth century, thus, they worked in at least ninety-one prefectures in south China, but mainly in Hangzhou, Jianyang in northern Fujian, and Chengdu in Sichuan. In the Jin and Yuan dynasties, the centers of production were Pingyang prefecture in southern Shanxi Province and, once again for southeast China, Hangzhou and Jianyang. By the late Ming, the lower Yangzi delta, mainly Suzhou and Nanjing, would dominate along with Jianyang. By the early seventeenth century, carvers would also have found their way to provinces that, in the Song and Yuan, had produced only a few books (e.g., Hunan, Shaanxi, and Guangdong) but had recently started to print a fair number of imprints for the book market.

— Joseph P. McDermott

In 989 Seongjong of Goryeo sent the monk Yeoga to request from the Song a copy of the complete Buddhist canon. The request was granted in 991 when Seongjong's official Han Eongong visited the Song court. In 1011, Hyeonjong of Goryeo issued the carving of their own set of the Buddhist canon, which would come to be known as the Goryeo Daejanggyeong. The project was suspended in 1031 after Heyongjong's death, but work resumed in 1046 after Munjong's accession to the throne. The completed work, amounting to some 6,000 volumes, was finished in 1087. Unfortunately the original set of woodblocks was destroyed in a conflagration during the Mongol invasion of 1232. King Gojong ordered another set to be created and work began in 1237, this time only taking 12 years to complete. In 1248 the complete Goryeo Daejanggyeong numbered 81,258 printing blocks, 52,330,152 characters, 1496 titles, and 6568 volumes. Due to the stringent editing process that went into the Goryeo Daejanggyeong and its surprisingly enduring nature, having survived completely intact for centuries, it is considered the most accurate of Buddhist canons written in Classical Chinese as well as a standard edition for East Asian Buddhist scholarship.

==== Modern era ====
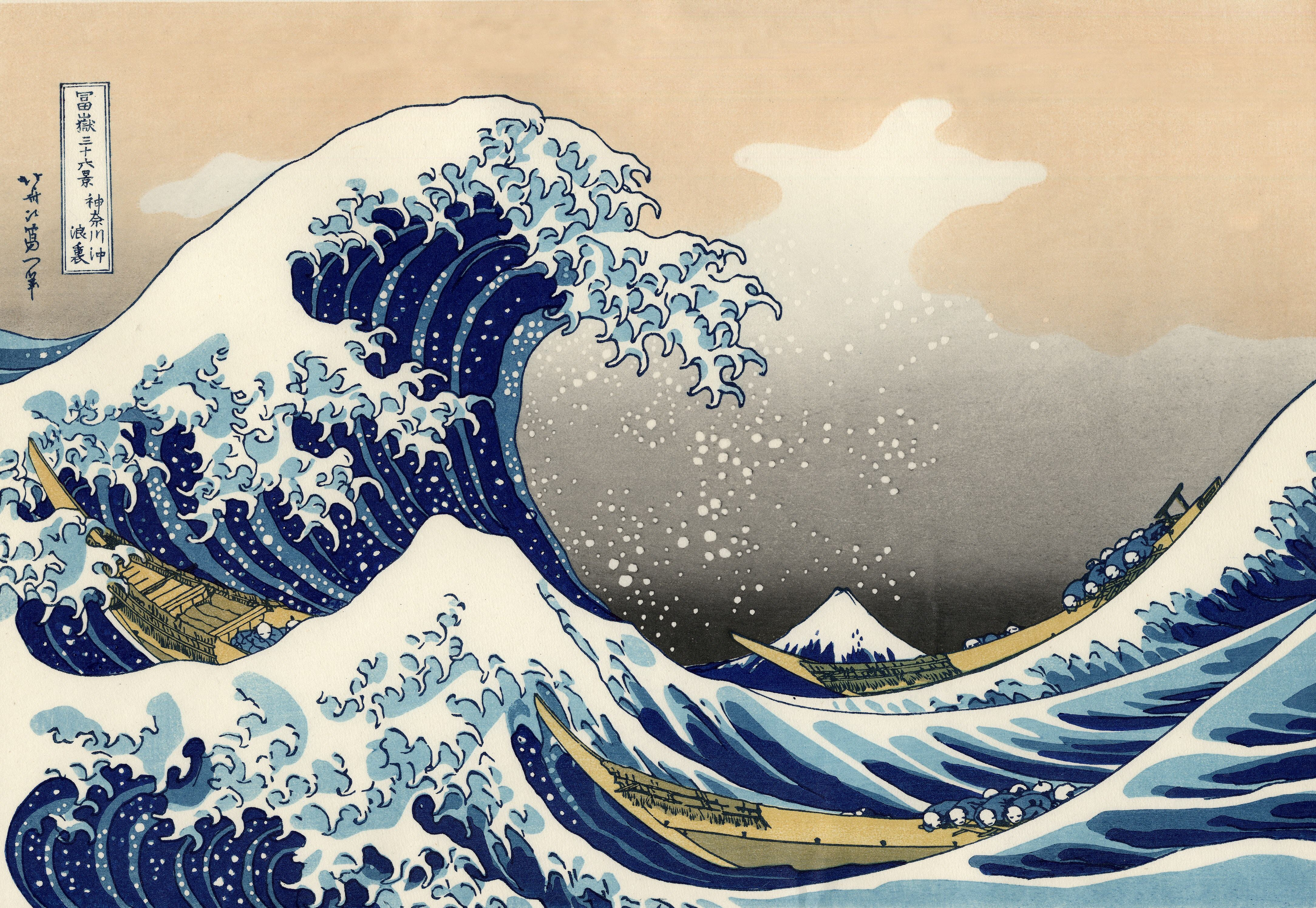
Under the Wave off Kanagawa by Hokusai (1760-1849), a ukiyo-e artist

In Japan, from the Edo period in the 1600s, books and illustrations were mass-produced by woodblock printing and spread among the common people. This was due to economic development and a relatively high literacy rate for the period. The literacy rate of the Japanese in the Edo period was almost 100% for the samurai class and 50% to 60% for the chōnin and nōmin (farmer) class due to the spread of private schools (terakoya). There were more than 600 rental bookstores in Edo, and people lent woodblock-printed illustrated books of various genres. The content of these books varied widely, including travel guides, gardening books, cookbooks, kibyōshi (satirical novels), sharebon (books on urban culture), kokkeibon (comical books), ninjōbon (romance novel), yomihon, kusazōshi, art books, play scripts for the kabuki and jōruri (puppet) theatre, etc. The best-selling books of this period were Kōshoku Ichidai Otoko (Life of an Amorous Man) by Ihara Saikaku, Nansō Satomi Hakkenden by Takizawa Bakin, and Tōkaidōchū Hizakurige by Jippensha Ikku, and these books were reprinted many times.

From the 17th to the 19th century, ukiyo-e depicting secular subjects became very popular among the Japanese common people and were mass-produced. Ukiyo-e is based on kabuki actors, sumo wrestlers, beautiful women, landscapes of sightseeing spots, historical tales, and so on, and Hokusai and Hiroshige are the most famous artists. In the 18th century, Suzuki Harunobu established the technique of multicolor woodblock printing called nishiki-e and greatly developed Japanese woodblock printing culture such as ukiyo-e. Ukiyo-e influenced European Japonism and Impressionism. In the early 20th century, shin-hanga, which fused the tradition of ukiyo-e with the techniques of Western paintings, became popular, and the works of Hasui Kawase and Hiroshi Yoshida gained international popularity.

==== Impact of woodblock printing ====
Prior to the introduction of printing, the size of private collections in China had already seen an increase since the invention of paper. Fan Ping (215–84) had in his collection 7,000 rolls (juan), or a few hundred titles. Two centuries later, Zhang Mian owned 10,000 juan, Shen Yue (441–513) 20,000 juan, and Xiao Tong and his cousin Xiao Mai both had collections of 30,000 juan. Emperor Yuan of Liang (508–555) was said to have had a collection of 80,000 juan. The combined total of all known private book collectors prior to the Song dynasty number around 200, with the Tang alone accounting for 60 of them.

Following the maturation of woodblock printing, official, commercial, and private publishing businesses emerged while the size and number of collections grew exponentially. The Song dynasty alone accounts for some 700 known private collections, more than triple the number of all the preceding centuries combined. Private libraries of 10–20 thousand juan became commonplace while six individuals owned collections of over 30,000 juan. The earliest extant private Song library catalogue lists 1,937 titles in 24,501 juan. Zhou Mi's collection numbered 42,000 juan, Chen Zhensun's collection lists 3,096 titles in 51,180 juan, and Ye Mengde (1077–1148) as well as one other individual owned libraries of 6,000 titles in 100,000 juan. The majority of which were secular in nature. Texts contained material such as medicinal instruction or came in the form of a leishu, a type of encyclopedic reference book used to help examination candidates.

Imperial establishments such as the Three Institutes: Zhaowen Institute, History Institute, and Jixian Institute also followed suit. At the start of the dynasty the Three Institutes' holdings numbered 13,000 juan, by the year 1023 39,142 juan, by 1068 47,588 juan, and by 1127 73,877 juan. The Three Institutes were one of several imperial libraries, with eight other major palace libraries, not including imperial academies. According to Weng Tongwen, by the 11th century, central government offices were saving tenfold by substituting earlier manuscripts with printed versions. The impact of woodblock printing on Song society is illustrated in the following exchange between Emperor Zhenzong and Xing Bing in the year 1005:

The emperor went to the Directorate of Education to inspect the Publications Office. He asked Xing Bing how many woodblocks were kept there. Bing replied, "At the start of our dynasty, there were fewer than four thousand. Today, there are more than one hundred thousand. The classics and histories, together with standard commentaries, are all fully represented. When I was young and devoted myself to learning, there were only one or two scholars in every hundred who possessed copies of all the classics and commentaries. There was no way to copy so many works. Today, printed editions of these works are abundant, and officials and commoners alike have them in their homes. Scholars are fortunate indeed to have been born in such an era as ours!

In 1076, the 39-year old Su Shi remarked upon the unforeseen effect an abundance of books had on examination candidates:

I can recall meeting older scholars, long ago, who said that when they were young they had a hard time getting their hands on a copy of Shiji or Han shu. If they were lucky enough to get one, they thought nothing of copying the entire text out by hand, so they could recite it day and night. In recent years merchants engrave and print all manner of books belonging to the hundred schools, and produce ten thousand pages a day. With books so readily available, you would think that students' writing and scholarship would be many times better than what they were in earlier generations. Yet, to the contrary, young men and examination candidates leave their books tied shut and never look at them, preferring to amuse themselves with baseless chatter. Why is this?

Woodblock printing also changed the shape and structure of books. Scrolls were gradually replaced by concertina binding (經摺裝) from the Tang period onward. The advantage was that it was now possible to flip to a reference without unfolding the entire document. The next development known as whirlwind binding (xuanfeng zhuang 旋風裝) was to secure the first and last leaves to a single large sheet, so that the book could be opened like an accordion.

Around the year 1000, butterfly binding was developed. Woodblock prints allowed two mirror images to be easily replicated on a single sheet. Thus two pages were printed on a sheet, which was then folded inwards. The sheets were then pasted together at the fold to make a codex with alternate openings of printed and blank pairs of pages. In the 14th century the folding was reversed outwards to give continuous printed pages, each backed by a blank hidden page. Later the sewn bindings were preferred rather than pasted bindings. Only relatively small volumes (juan 卷) were bound up, and several of these would be enclosed in a cover called a tao, with wooden boards at front and back, and loops and pegs to close up the book when not in use. For example, one complete Tripitaka had over 6,400 juan in 595 tao.

The rise of woodblock printing technology led to a decline in book prices by about one tenth what they had been before the 11th century. Not all areas experienced the same price reductions, which was also dependent on other factors besides the technology, resulting in regional variations in the price of print works by as high as 600 percent during the 12th century. Woodblock printing did not replace manuscripts either, which continued to remain commercially viable through substantially reducing their prices. According to the Ming dynasty author Hu Yinglin, "if no printed edition were available on the market, the hand-copied manuscript of a book would cost ten times as much as the printed work", also "once a printed edition appeared, the transcribed copy could no longer be sold and would be discarded". The result is that despite the mutual co-existence of hand-copied manuscripts and printed texts, the cost of the book had declined by about 90 percent by the end of the 16th century. As a result, literacy increased. In 1488, the Korean Choe Bu observed during his trip to China that "even village children, ferrymen, and sailors" could read, although this applied mainly to the south while northern China remained largely illiterate. Manuscripts also gained new cultural value as imprints became more common, and were even preferred by elite scholars and collectors. The age of printing gave the act of copying by hand a new dimension of cultural reverence. Those who considered themselves real scholars and true connoisseurs of the book did not consider imprints to be real books. Under the elitist attitudes of the time, "printed books were for those who did not truly care about books".

=== Central Asia and Iran ===
Printing started appearing further west after its invention in China. The Uyghurs used wooden movable type by the 12th-13th centuries. In 1908, more than a thousand pieces of Uyghur type made of wood, engraved in Sogdian script, were discovered in Dunhuang. To date no manuscripts or fragments using Uyghur movable type have been identified, but traces of ink on the movable type have been found, confirming their use. The Uyghurs also made use of woodblock printing by the 14th century. Printed texts discovered in Turfan dating to around 1300 contained multiple languages such as Sogdian, Sanskrit, Uyghur, and Chinese. Some of them had titles and page numbers in Chinese which suggests that they were produced by Chinese craftsmen. Fragments of Buddhist texts were printed in both Uyghur and Chinese while bearing a red Chinese seal. A Mongolian calendar dated to 1324 with printed Uyghur text was discovered in Turfan.

It is speculated that printing was spread further west by Uyghurs under the Mongol Empire. A large number of Uyghurs were recruited by the Mongol army and Uyghur culture played an important role in the empire. After the Mongols incorporated Persia under their dominion, woodblock printing was used there for paper money, which was based on the exact same model as Chinese paper money. Even the Chinese name for it (chao) was adopted by the Persians. Paper money was printed in Tabriz in 1294 to alleviate the shortage of coinage but the markets refused to accept the new currency and the khan was forced to abandon it. Between 1301 and 1311, Rashid al-Din Hamadani, the prime minister of Ghazan, wrote the Jami' al-tawarikh, which described the process of Chinese woodblock printing. Abu Sulayman Banakati repeated the same description in another work dated 1317. A print was discovered in an excavation at the port of El Qoseir where Chinese wares were also discovered.

=== Islamic world ===
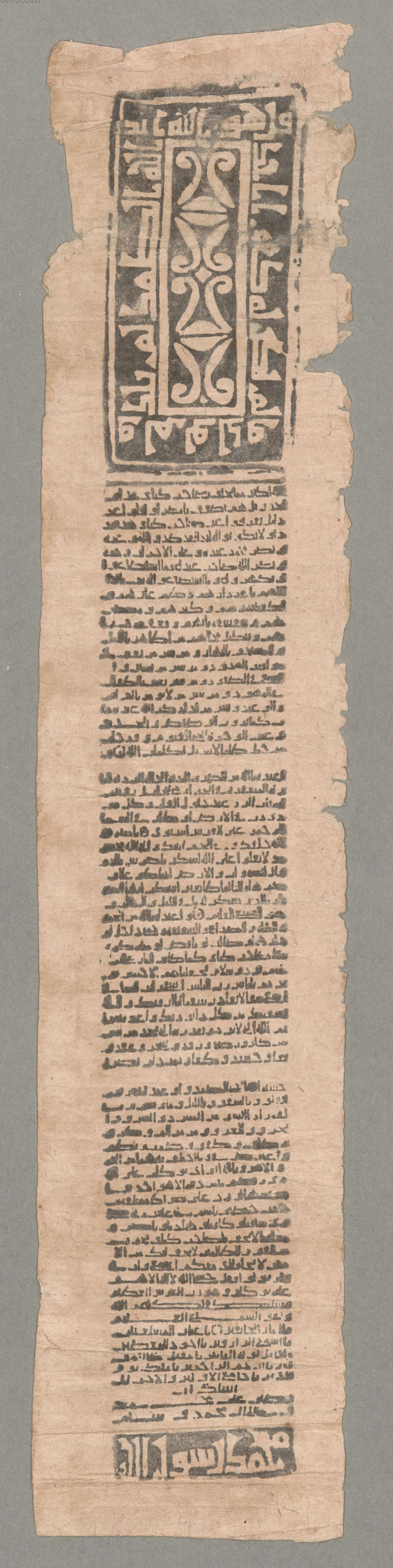
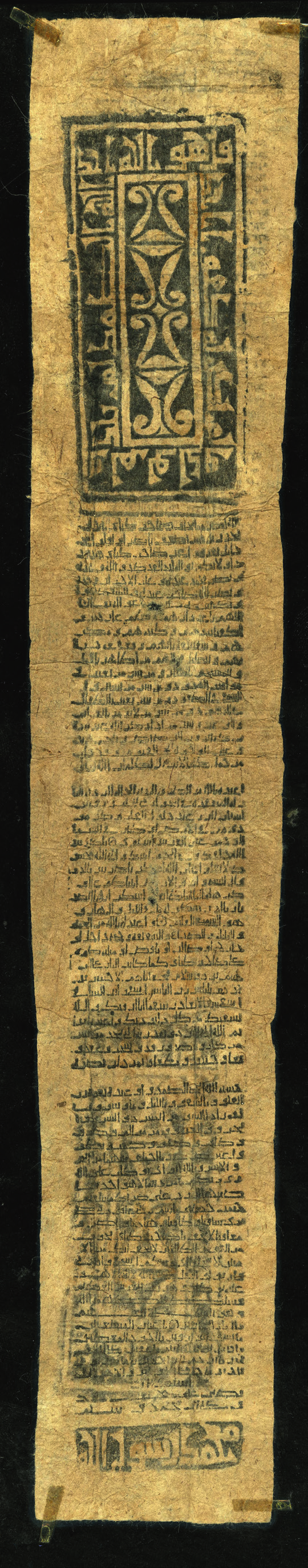
2 prints of some of the earliest Arabic blockprints, showing degradation of the matrix between prints.

From 900 to 1444, the Islamic world employed a block printing method known as ṭarsh. Originally utilizing wooden blocks, the practice evolved to include carved lead and tin matrices by the 1200s. It is disputed whether or not this technique originated from Chinese printing. According to some historians, such as Thomas Frances Carter, J. Karabacek, Adolf Grohmann, and Tsuen-Hsuin Tsien, they are likely connected to printing in Central Asia and China. Their appearance suggests that they were printed using the same brush and pad process used by the Chinese rather than by pressure. Carter compares their religious nature in similarity to the early Buddhist prints of China. The theory of Chinese origin for these fragments is disputed by Richard W. Bulliet. According to Bulliet, some of the Arabic prints are too rough to have been based on the same method used by the Chinese. They did not have a major impact the same way that other known Chinese products such as Tang pottery did. Thousands of imitation pieces of Tang pottery were created in the Middle East because of how rare and valuable genuine Tang pieces were. The Arabic print fragments evidently did not share the same prestige or quality as Chinese prints and were likely circulated among lower class society.

The technique's appearance in 10th century Muslim Spain marked Europe's first known exposure to block printing. State authorities occasionally adopted the method for practical and administrative purposes, such as stamping 11th century Fatimid tax receipts, printing 13th century Almohad imperial decrees and stamping 14th century commercial goods at the Almería warehouse.

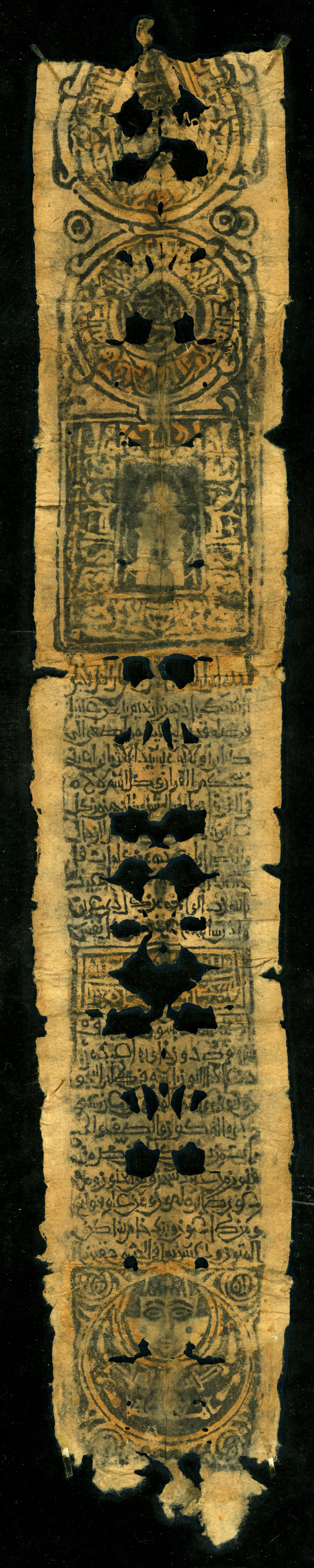
A printed depiction of a head at the bottom of a talisman, similar to Fatimid manuscript illustrations.

The craft's most widespread and best-documented application, however, was the mass production of protective amulets and talismans. These narrow strips, typically about 18 × 7 cm, were designed to be rolled up and worn around the neck. They commonly featured Qur'anic verses, religious invocations, magical symbols and numerological elements. Production was largely carried out by itinerant street magicians and tricksters known as the Banū Sāsān or Ghurabāʾ, who deliberately kept the process secret. By presenting printed amulets as individually handwritten, they maintained the illusion of personal craftsmanship for their often illiterate clients. This culture of secrecy likely contributed to the technique's limited broader adoption. Roughly one hundred examples survive today. Many are more elaborate than contemporary handwritten versions, displaying refined Arabic calligraphy and, in some cases, Hebrew, Syriac, or Coptic scripts. Printers sometimes used colored inks (red, yellow, green), and multiple blocks could be used for different decorative elements, scripts, and even for different textual themes, customizing pieces depending on the need of the client. The technical sophistication of the craft is evident in the range of lettering sizes, which could measure from a large 3 cm down to a minuscule 1 mm in height.

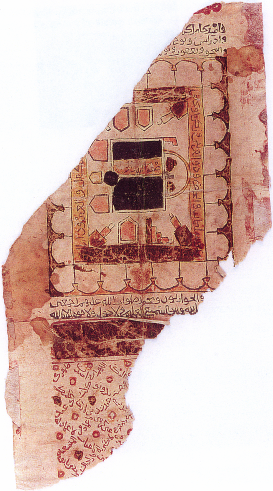
1230s Printed Hajj certificate featuring the Kaaba

A much more monumental application appears in printed Hajj certificates, which make up the second major category of surviving artifacts. Produced in Damascus beginning around 1210, they reached peak popularity in the second quarter of the 13th century, when only printed versions were issued. These large documents (ranging from 112 × 23.5 cm to monumental pieces over 210 × 50 cm) integrated text, decorative borders, and detailed illustrations of Hajj rites and sacred sites, all printed with woodblocks.Larger certificates required multiple blocks for their illustrations. They exhibit a superior quality and visual harmony as compared to handmade certificates, and were commissioned by high ranking figures, including Ayyubid royalty. Production quality later waned under the Mamluks, and the certificates disappeared by the 14th century. The last known example of the tarsh is an ornate 124.6 cm talisman printed between 1436 and 1444 – the longest surviving specimen. Shortly afterward, block printing vanished from the Islamic world for reasons that remain unclear. By the time the technique was rediscovered in the late 19th century, it had been entirely forgotten. Some scholars suggest that Egyptian Ghurabāʾ (Romani groups) migrating to Central Europe in the early 15th century may have contributed to the transmission of block-printing knowledge to the West.

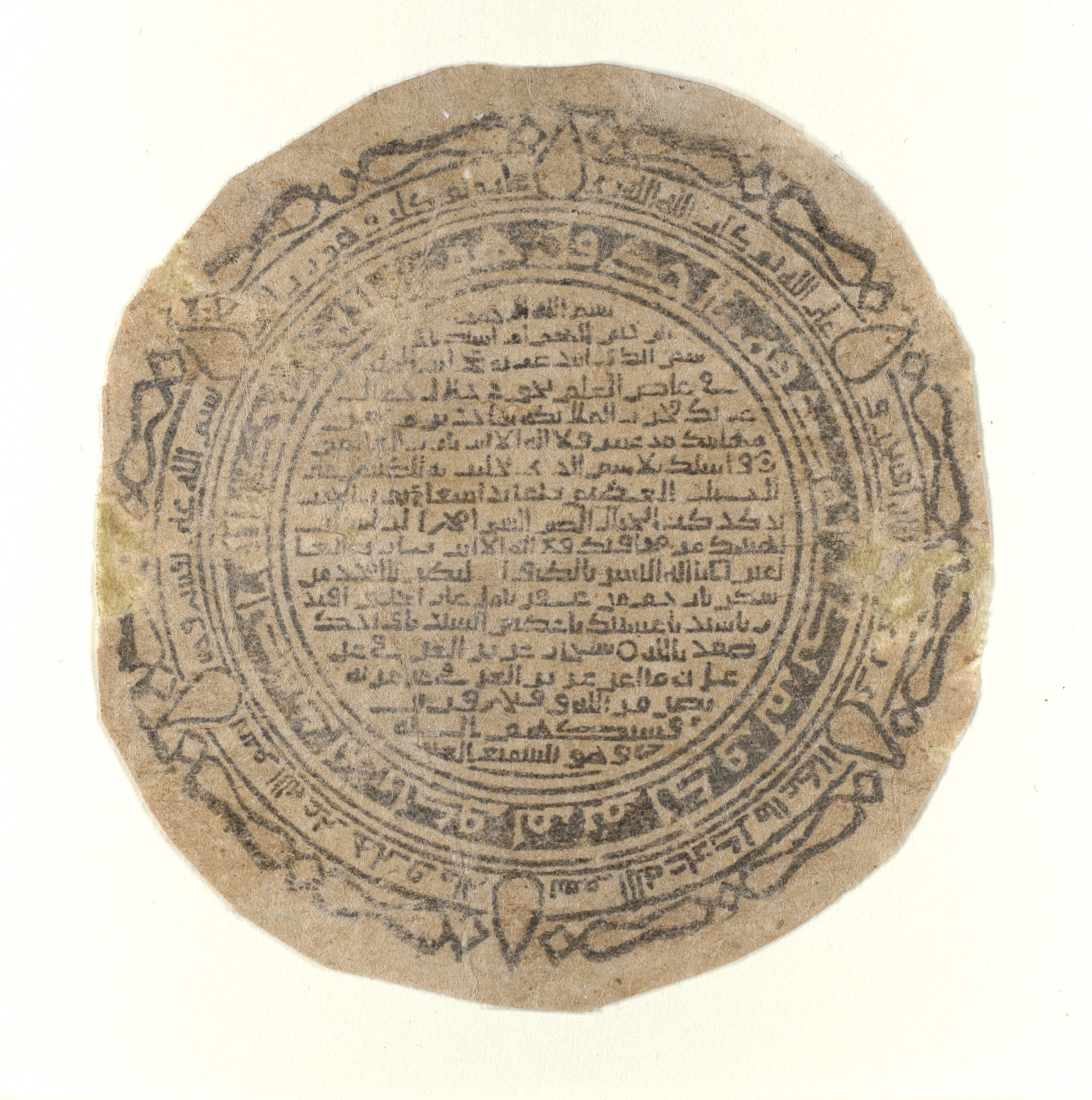
A circular print with minuscule 1mm high text

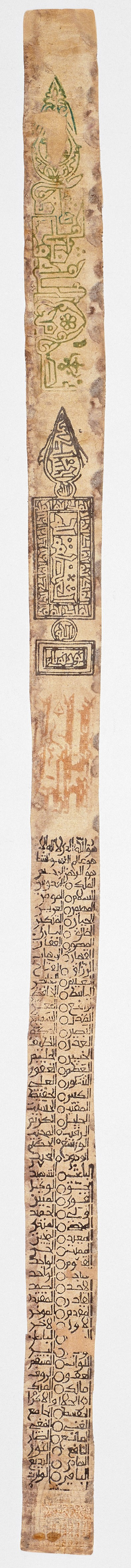
A use of green ink

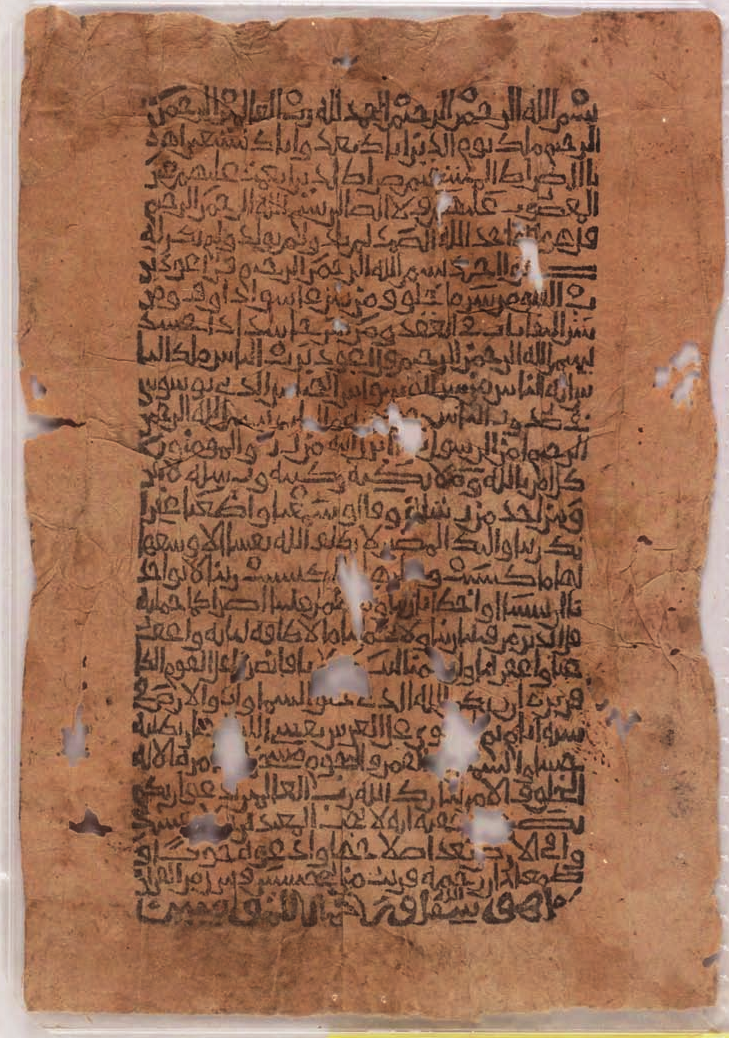
A print which contains solely quotations from the Qur'an

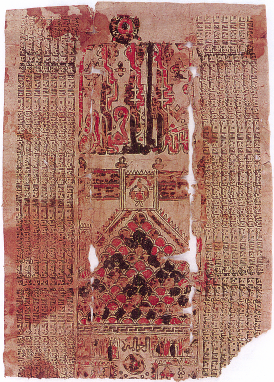
Hajj certificate from 1230, the undulating letters of the Basmala is similar to Chinese Seals

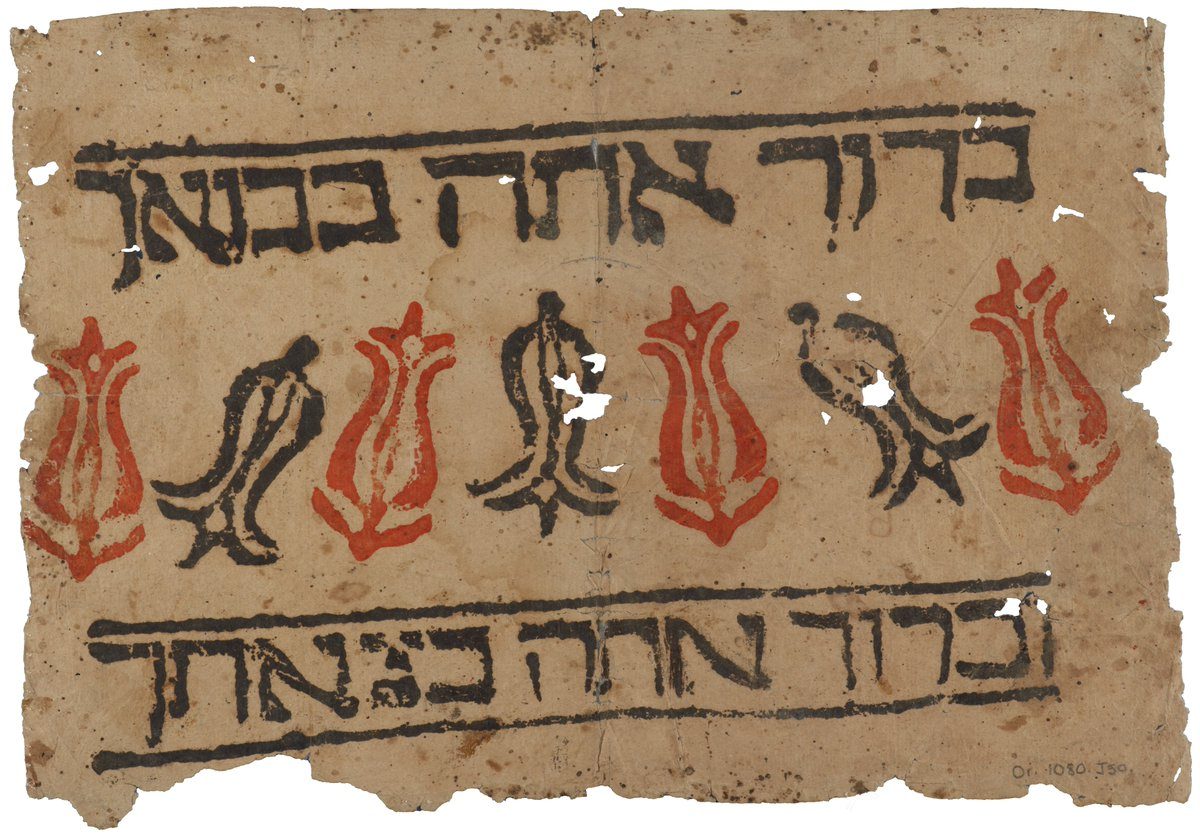
A Hebrew print, late 1300s

=== Europe ===
Woodblock printing was used for textile patterns in Europe by the mid-14th century and for images on sheets by the end of the century. Block prints were produced in southern Germany and Venice and across central Europe between 1400 and 1450. They were all religious in nature and most of them are undated, but they are believed to have been produced in the late 14th and early 15th centuries. They were printed as outlines and filled in with color manually by hand or stencil. Block books appeared in Germany c. 1400.

There is no conclusive evidence that Chinese printing technology spread to Europe. However, a number of authors have advanced theories in favor of a Chinese origin for European printing based on early references and circumstantial evidence. Tsien suggests that woodblock printing may have spread from China to Europe due to communications during the Mongol Empire era and based on similarities between blockprints in both areas. Tsien suggests that European missionaries to China during the 14th century could have borrowed the practice of creating prints to be colored manually later on, which had been prevalent in China for a long time with Buddhist prints. The block books of Europe were produced using methods and materials similar to those in China and sometimes in ways contrary to prevailing European norms: European wood blocks were cut parallel with the grain in the same way as the Chinese method rather than the prevailing European practice of cutting across the grain, water-based ink was used rather than oil-based ink, only one side of the paper was printed rather than both, and rubbing rather than pressure was employed to leave the print. Robert Curzon, 14th Baron Zouche (1810–1873) said that European and Chinese block books were so similar in every way that they must have originated in China.

The question of whether printing originated in Europe or China was raised in the early 16th century by the Portuguese poet Garcia de Resende (1470–1536). Paolo Giovio (1483–1552), an Italian historian who had come into possession of several Chinese books and maps through João de Barros (1496–1570), claimed that printing was invented in China and spread to Europe through Russia. Juan González de Mendoza (1545–1618) made similar claims about printing coming from China through Russia but also added another route through Arabia by sea and that it influenced Johannes Gutenberg. Several other authors throughout the 16th century repeated such statements.

Joseph P. McDermott disputes the theory of Chinese printing being transmitted to Europe and emphasizes the lack of evidence. Although the Mongols planned to use printed paper currency in Persia, the scheme failed shortly thereafter. No books were printed in Persia before the 19th century and Chinese prints apparently made little impact on the region. There are no surviving printed playing cards from the Middle East while pre-1450 printed cards from medieval Europe contained no text. Although some elite Europeans were aware of printed paper money by the late 13th century, the earliest evidence that Europeans were aware of Chinese book printing only appeared in the early 16th century. McDermott argues that modern comparisons of techniques used in European and Chinese block books are ahistorical and that rather than direct transmission of technique, similarities between them were just as likely the result of convergent evolution.

More recently, Kristina Richardson has advanced the suggestion that woodblock printing may have reached Europe through the migrations of Egyptian Romani people. In Egypt, woodblock printing was largely practiced by a Romani community known as the Ghurabāʾ, while multiple sources attest to the movement of Egyptian Romani populations into Bavaria and Bohemia at the opening of the fifteenth century. Further support lies in formal parallels: both ṭarsh prints and early European woodcuts emphasize religious imagery, are typically printed on one side only, and employ a similar palette of red, brown, yellow, and green.

== Movable type (1041) ==
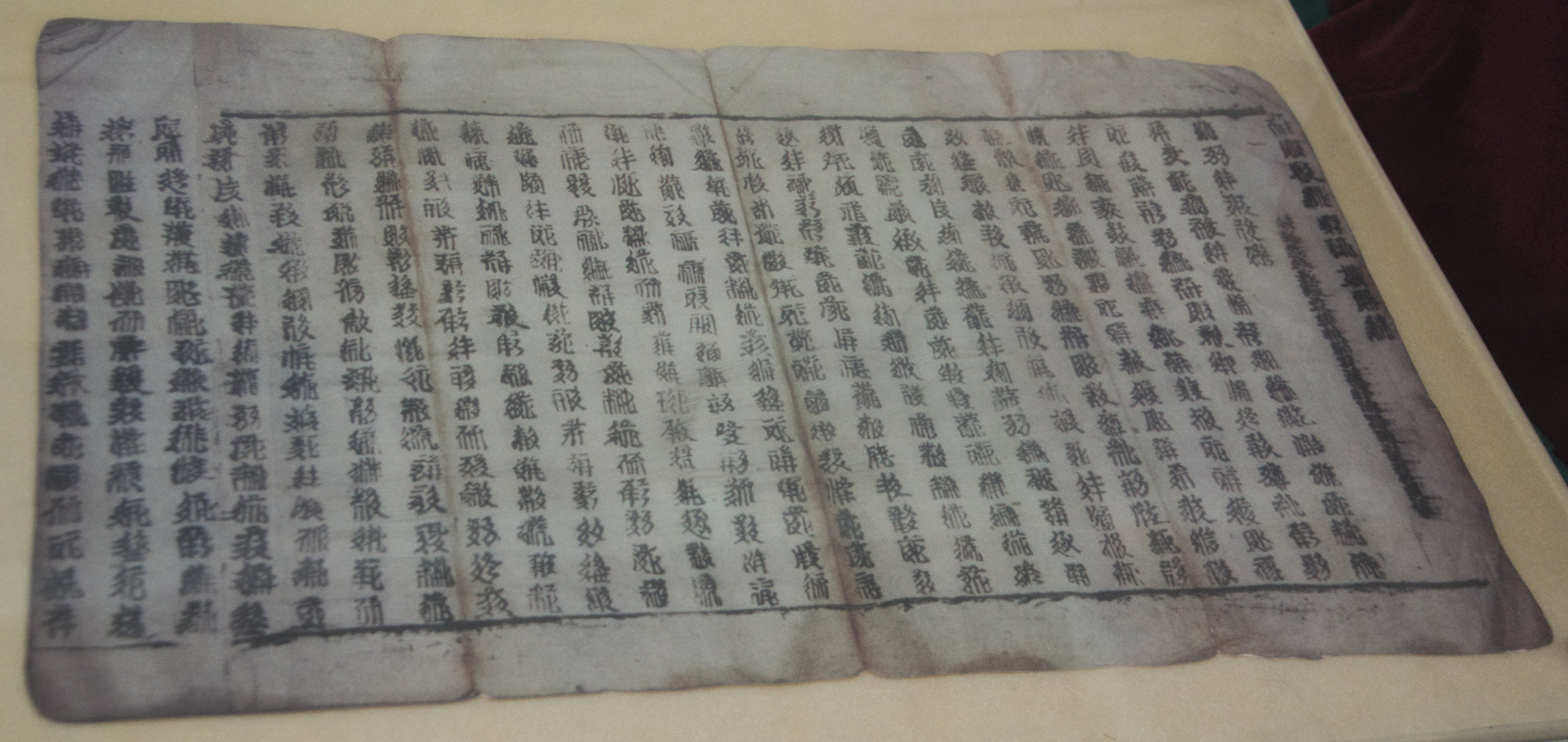
Ceramic movable type print from Western Xia. Found in Wuwei, Gansu

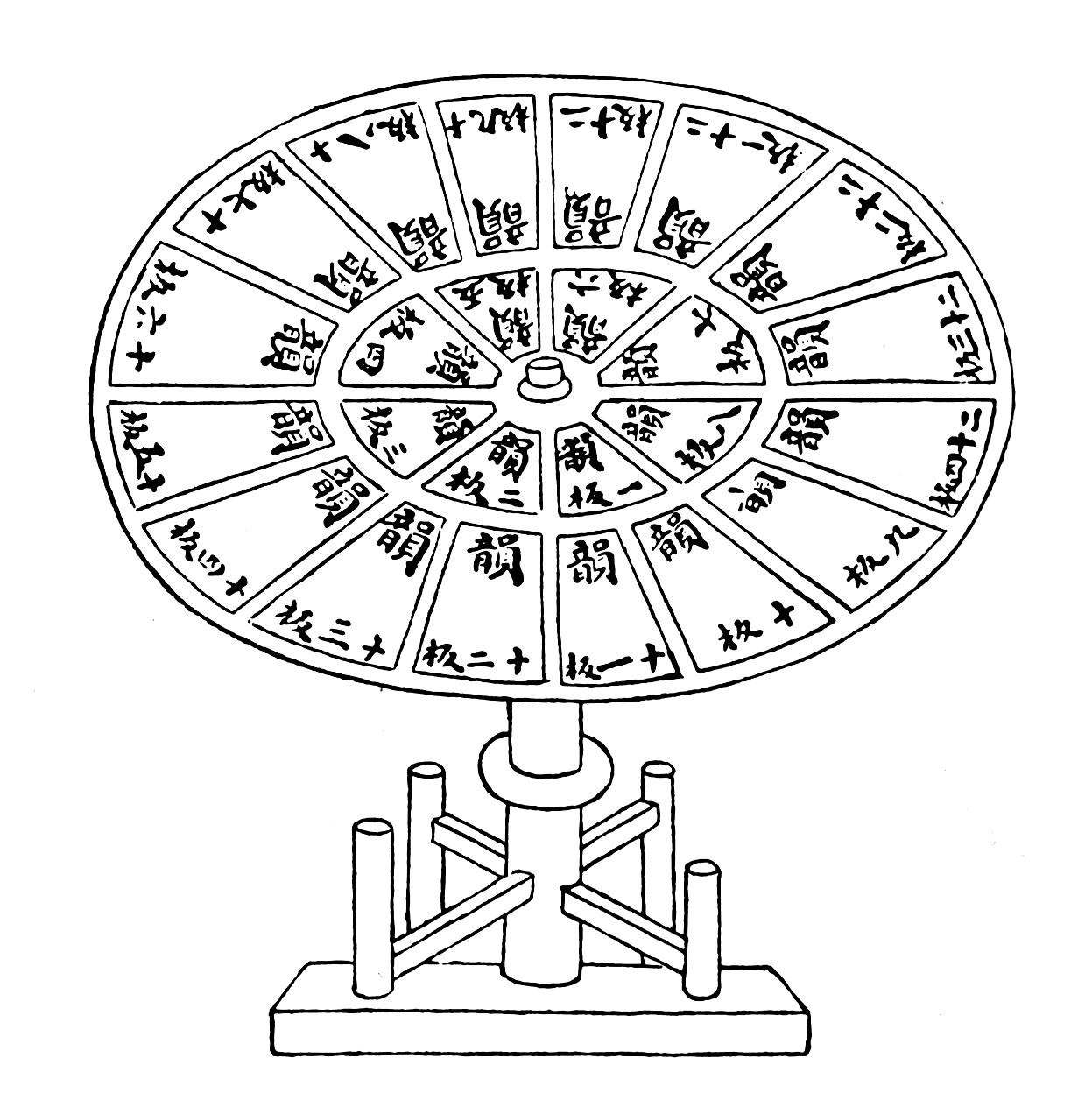
A revolving typecase for wooden type in China, from Wang Zhen's book published in 1313

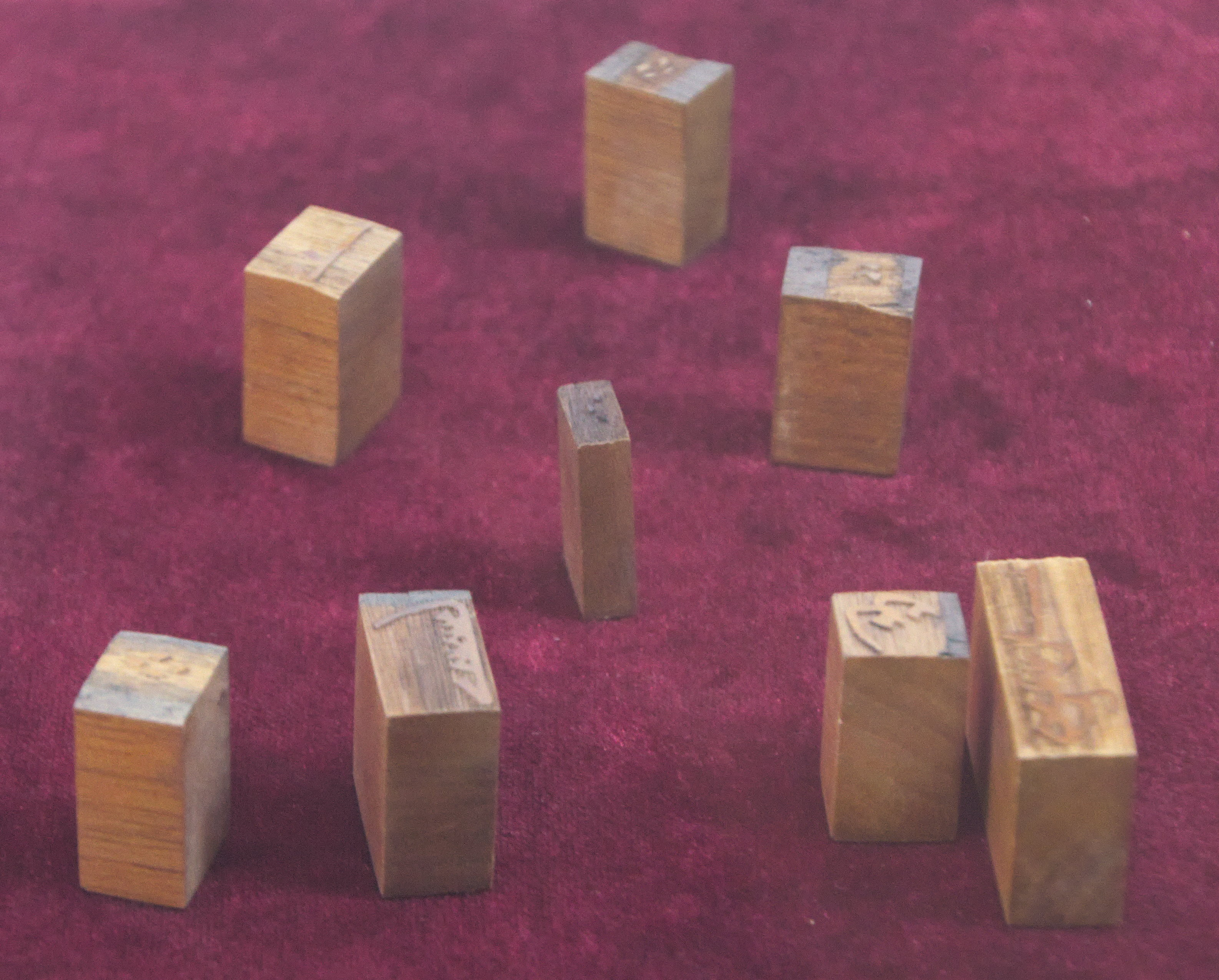
Wooden movable type for Old Uyghur alphabet, dated to the 12th–13th centuries. Discovered in the Mogao caves.

Movable type is the system of printing and typography using individual pieces of type.

=== Ceramic movable type ===
Movable type was invented in the Northern Song dynasty around the year 1041 by the commoner Bi Sheng. Bi Sheng's movable type was fired in porcelain. After his death, ceramic movable type may have spread to the Tangut kingdom of Western Xia, where a Buddhist text known as the Vimalakirti Nirdesa Sutra was found in modern Wuwei, Gansu, dating to the reign of Emperor Renzong of Western Xia (r. 1125-1193). The text features traits that have been identified as hallmarks of clay movable type such as the hollowness of the character strokes and deformed and broken strokes. The ceramic movable-type also passed onto Bi Sheng's descendants. The next mention of movable type occurred in 1193 when a Southern Song chief counselor, Zhou Bida (周必大), attributed the movable-type method of printing to Shen Kuo. However Shen Kuo did not invent the movable type but credited it to Bi Sheng in his Dream Pool Essays. Zhou used clay movable type to print his Yutang zaji (Jade hall notes), composed of 28 sections in 7,000 characters. The ceramic movable type was also mentioned by Kublai Khan's councilor Yao Shu, who convinced his pupil Yang Gu to print language primers using this method.

The ceramic type did not hold the water-based Chinese calligraphic ink well, and had the additional disadvantage of the size of the type sometimes changing during the baking process, resulting in uneven matching of the type, and preventing it from becoming popular.

=== Wooden movable type ===
Bi Sheng also developed wooden movable type, but it was abandoned in favor of ceramic types due to the presence of wood grains and the unevenness of the wooden type after being soaked in ink. However wooden movable type had evidently reached the Tangut Western Xia to the west by the 12th century. There, the Tanguts printed the Auspicious Tantra of All-Reaching Union, a 449-page text considered to be the earliest extant example of a text printed using the wooden movable type. The Auspicious Tantra texts were found in the ruins of the Baisigou Square Pagoda in the Helan Mountains, Ningxia. They feature traits of movable type texts such as identical length bar lines, some characters printed upside down, different shades of ink, and interlaced lines. Another Tangut text known as the Avatamsaka Sutra contains descriptions of the merits of wooden movable type such as a "vow to carve individual characters", "those engaged in typesetting are virtuous", and "those engaged in carving characters and printing are intelligent and can expect to have their wishes fulfilled". The text shows traits of movable type such as correcting mistakes by directly overlaying incorrect characters with the correct ones. Twelve Tangut titles printed in movable type survive to this day.

The Uyghurs too seem to have used wooden movable type although it is unknown where they got the technology. In 1908, more than a thousand pieces of Uyghur type made of wood, engraved in Sogdian script, were discovered in Dunhuang. They are believed to date to the 12th century when the Uyghurs also made use of woodblock printing. To date no manuscripts or fragments of Uyghur movable type have been found.

Wang Zhen, who lived in the Yuan dynasty, also described the wooden movable type in his Book of Agriculture (Nongshu 農書) of 1313.

Now, however, there is another method [beyond earthenware type] that is both more exact and more convenient. A compositor's form is made of wood, strips of bamboo are used to mark the lines and a block is engraved with characters. The block is then cut into squares with a small fine saw till each character forms a separate piece. These separate characters are finished off with a knife on all four sides, and compared and tested till they are exactly the same height and size. Then the types are placed in the columns [of the form] and bamboo strips which have been prepared are pressed in between them. After the types have all been set in the form, the spaces are filled in with wooden plugs, so that the type is perfectly firm and will not move. When the type is absolutely firm, the ink is smeared on and printing begins.

— Wang Zhen

Wang Zhen used two rotating circular tables as trays for laying out his type. The first table was separated into 24 trays in which each movable type was categorized based on a number corresponding with a rhyming pattern. The second table contained miscellaneous characters.

Using more than 30,000 wooden movable types, Wang Zhen printed a hundred copies of his county gazetteer, Records of Jingde County (Jingde xianzhi 旌德縣志), a text containing more than 60,000 characters.

Wooden movable type printing became relatively common during the Ming dynasty and became widespread during the Qing dynasty.

=== Metal movable type ===
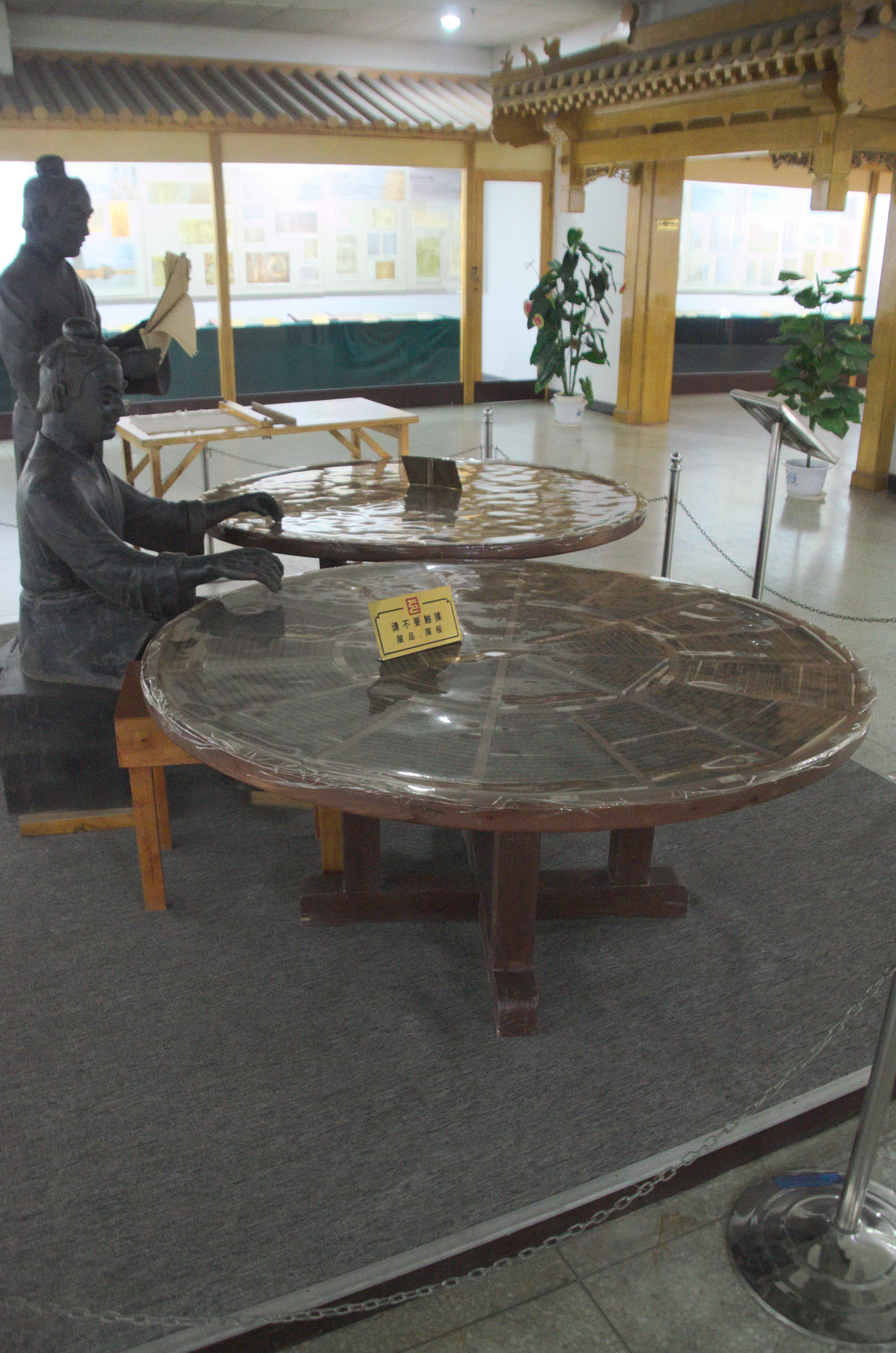
Models of Bi Sheng's 11th century revolving typecase tables in Beijing

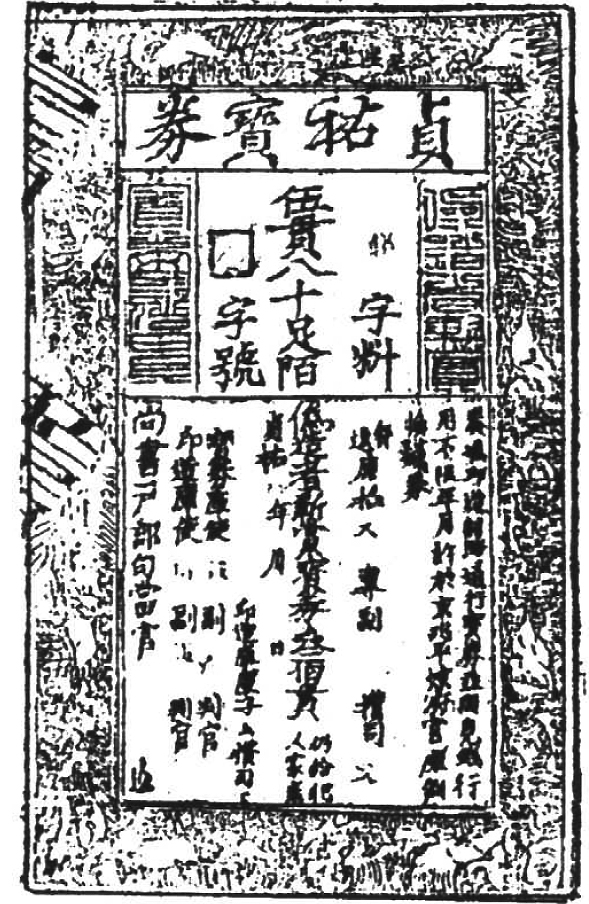
Copperplate of 1215–1216 5000-cash Jin dynasty (1115–1234) paper money with bronze movable type counterfeit markers

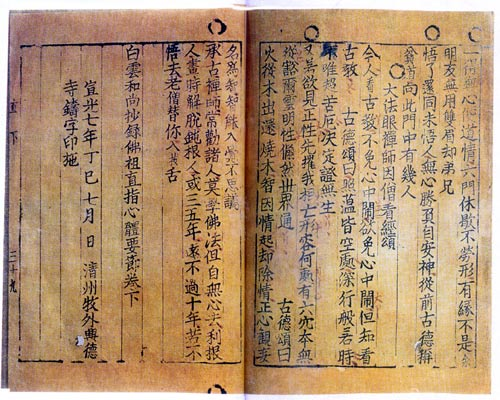
Jikji: Selected Teachings of Buddhist Sages and Seon Masters, the earliest known book printed with movable metal type, 1377. Bibliothèque Nationale de France, Paris.

Metal movable type appeared in the late Song and Yuan dynasties. Bronze movable types were used to print banknotes and official documents by both the Song and Jin.

In the Jin dynasty, copper-block prints were slotted with two square holes for embedding bronze movable type characters, each selected from 1000 different characters, such that each printed paper money had a different combination of markers. A copper block printed paper banknote dated between 1215 and 1216 in the collection of Luo Zhenyu's Pictorial Paper Money of the Four Dynasties, 1914, shows two special characters: one called Ziliao, the other called Zihao, for the purpose of preventing counterfeit. Over the Ziliao there is a small character (輶) printed with movable copper type, while over the Zihao there is an empty square hole; apparently the associated copper metal type was lost. Another sample of Song dynasty money of the same period in the collection of Shanghai Museum has two empty square holes above Ziliao as well as Zihou, due to the loss of two copper movable types.

In 1234, cast metal movable type was used in Goryeo (Korea) to print the 50-volume Prescribed Texts for Rites of the Past and Present, compiled by Ch'oe Yun-ŭi, but no copies survived to the present. Ch'oe Yun-ŭi built on an earlier Chinese method of creating movable type; he adapted a method for minting bronze coins to cast three-dimensional characters in metal. Because of the length of the text Ch'oe Yun-ŭi did not complete the project until 1250. The oldest extant book printed with movable metal type is the Jikji, printed in 1377.

Tin movable type is mentioned in Wang Zhen's Zao Huozi Yinshufa (造活字印書法) of 1298, but it was considered unsatisfactory due to incompatibility with the inking process. Only in the late 15th century did bronze movable type begin to be widely used in China.

=== China ===
During the Ming and Qing dynasties, both wooden and metal movable types were quite common, but the preferred printing method remained woodblock. During the Qing dynasty, the printing house inside the Forbidden City used movable copper type to print the Gujin tushu jicheng. The metal fonts were melted down for coins at the start of the Qianlong Emperor's reign in 1735. Later another set of movable type was created to print the Siku quanshu, but the material chosen was wood rather than metal to cut down on costs. In one case an entire set of wooden type numbering 250,000 pieces was used only for printing the emperor's rare book collection, and then used for firewood. Despite official patronage of movable type prints, the Forbidden City's printing house never used it for more than 10 percent of all printed materials while 90 percent of printed books used the older woodblock technology. Woodblocks remained the dominant printing method in China until the introduction of lithography in the late 19th century.

==== Korea ====
Metal movable type received most use among the East Asian countries in Korea where it was most widespread, but it still never replaced woodblock printing. The promulgation of hangul was done through woodblock prints. The general assumption is that movable type did not replace block printing in places that used Chinese characters due to the expense of producing more than 200,000 individual pieces of type. Even woodblock printing was not as cost productive as simply paying a copyist to write out a book by hand if there was no intention of producing more than a few copies. Although Sejong introduced Hangeul, an alphabetic system, in the 15th century, Hangeul only replaced hanja in the 20th century. And unlike China, the movable type system was kept mainly within the confines of a highly stratified elite Korean society:

Korean printing with movable metallic type developed mainly within the royal foundry of the Yi dynasty. Royalty kept a monopoly of this new technique and by royal mandate suppressed all non-official printing activities and any budding attempts at commercialization of printing. Thus, printing in early Korea served only the small, noble groups of the highly stratified society.

— Sohn Pow-Key

==== Japan ====
In Japan the first Western style movable type printing-press was brought to Japan by Tenshō embassy in 1590, and was first printed in Kazusa, Nagasaki in 1591. However, western printing-press were discontinued after the ban on Christianity in 1614. The moveable type printing-press seized from Korea by Toyotomi Hideyoshi's forces in 1593 was also in use at the same time as the printing press from Europe. An edition of the Confucian Analects was printed in 1598, using a Korean moveable type printing press, at the order of Emperor Go-Yōzei.

Tokugawa Ieyasu established a printing school at Enko-ji in Kyoto and started publishing books using domestic wooden movable type printing-press instead of metal from 1599. Ieyasu supervised the production of 100,000 types, which were used to print many political and historical books. In 1605, books using domestic copper movable type printing-press began to be published, but copper type did not become mainstream after Ieyasu died in 1616.

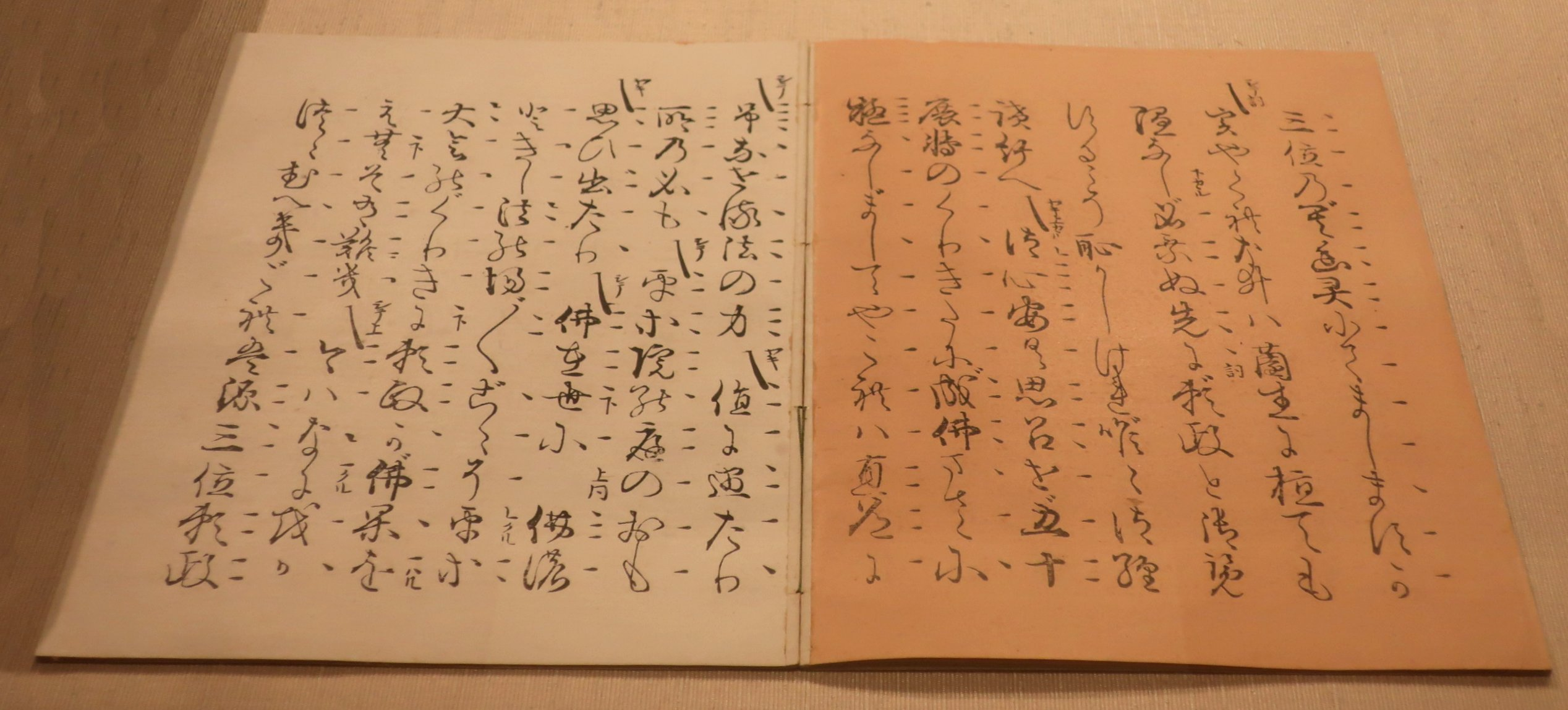
Saga-bon (嵯峨本, Saga Books): libretto for the Noh play Katsuragi by Hon'ami Kōetsu. The Saga-bon is one of the earliest works produced on a movable type press in Japan.

The great pioneers in applying movable type printing press to the creation of artistic books, and in preceding mass production for general consumption, were Honami Kōetsu and Suminokura Soan. At their studio in Saga, Kyoto, the pair created a number of woodblock versions of the Japanese classics, both text and images, essentially converting emaki (handscrolls) to printed books, and reproducing them for wider consumption. These books, now known as Kōetsu Books, Suminokura Books, or Saga Books (嵯峨本, Saga-bon), are considered the first and finest printed reproductions of many of these classic tales; the Saga Book of the Tales of Ise (Ise monogatari), printed in 1608, is especially renowned. For aesthetic reasons, the typeface of the Saga-bon, like that of traditional handwritten books, adopted the renmen-tai (連綿体), in which several characters are written in succession with smooth brush strokes. As a result, a single typeface was sometimes created by combining two to four semi-cursive and cursive kanji or hiragana characters. In one book, 2,100 characters were created, but 16% of them were used only once.

Despite the appeal of moveable type, however, craftsmen soon decided that the semi cursive and cursive script style of Japanese writings was better reproduced using woodblocks. By 1640 woodblocks were once again used for nearly all purposes. After the 1640s, movable type printing declined, and books were mass-produced by conventional woodblock printing during most of the Edo period. It was after the 1870s, during the Meiji period, when Japan opened the country to the West and began to modernize, that this technique was used again.

==== Movable type vs. woodblock printing ====
Traditionally it has been assumed that the prevalence of woodblock printing in East Asia as a result of Chinese characters led to the stagnation of printing culture and enterprise in that region. S. H. Steinberg describes woodblock printing in his Five Hundred Years of Printing as having "outlived their usefulness" and their printed material as "cheap tracts for the half-literate, ... which anyway had to be very brief because of the laborious process of cutting the letters." John Man's The Gutenberg Revolution makes a similar case: "wood-blocks were even more demanding than manuscript pages to make, and they wore out and broke, and then you had to carve another one – a whole page at a time."

Recent commentaries on printing in China using contemporary European observers with first hand knowledge complicate the traditional narrative. T. H. Barrett points out that only Europeans who had never seen Chinese woodblock printing in action tended to dismiss it, perhaps due to the almost instantaneous arrival of both xylography and movable type in Europe. The early Jesuit missionaries of late 16th-century China, for instance, had a similar distaste for wood based printing for very different reasons. These Jesuits found that "the cheapness and omnipresence of printing in China made the prevailing wood-based technology extremely disturbing, even dangerous." Matteo Ricci made note of "the exceedingly large numbers of books in circulation here and the ridiculously low prices at which they are sold." Two hundred years later the Englishman John Barrow, by way of the Macartney mission to Qing China, also remarked with some amazement that the printing industry was "as free as in England, and the profession of printing open to everyone." The commercial success and profitability of woodblock printing was attested to by one British observer at the end of the nineteenth century, who noted that even before the arrival of western printing methods, the price of books and printed materials in China had already reached an astoundingly low price compared to what could be found in his home country. Of this, he said:

We have an extensive penny literature at home, but the English cottager cannot buy anything like the amount of printed matter for his penny that the Chinaman can for even less. A penny Prayer-book, admittedly sold at a loss, cannot compete in mass of matter with many of the books to be bought for a few cash in China. When it is considered, too, that a block has been laboriously cut for each leaf, the cheapness of the result is only accounted for by the wideness of sale.

Other modern scholars such as Endymion Wilkinson hold a more conservative and skeptical view. While Wilkinson does not deny "China's dominance in book production from the fourth to the fifteenth century," he also insists that arguments for the Chinese advantage "should not be extended either forwards or backwards in time."

European book production began to catch up with China after the introduction of the mechanical printing press in the mid fifteenth century. Reliable figures of the number of imprints of each edition are as hard to find in Europe as they are in China, but one result of the spread of printing in Europe was that public and private libraries were able to build up their collections and for the first time in over a thousand years they began to match and then overtake the largest libraries in China.

== Theory of movable type transmission ==
According to a tradition in Feltre and Lombardy, an Italian engraver named Panfilo Castaldi (1398–1490) introduced movable type to Europe after having seen Chinese books brought by Marco Polo. Inspired by the Chinese prints, Castaldi started using wooden movable type and he printed several broadsides at Venice in 1426. The tradition tracing movable type to Castaldi also states that Johannes Gutenberg's wife saw Chinese printing blocks in Venice, which inspired their own invention of printing. This story was recorded by Robert Curzon citing a news article written by a doctor from Feltre dated 1843. Henry Yule (1820–1889), who translated Marco Polo's works, viewed the story with skepticism but believed that Chinese wood blocks could have been transferred via travelers.

Guido Panciroli (1523–1599) disputed the theory of European movable type originating in China. Panciroli stated that Gutenberg's movable type was different from that of China and was a "modern thing" although he did not specify what the differences were. André Blum based the difference on the production of movable characters made from a fusible metal. This required three things: "a matrix or mould in which the letter is engraved in intaglio, an alloy cast in the matrix, and a reproduction of the character in relief on the punch". However, a similar metal casting method was used in Korea as noted by G. F. Hudson. According to Hudson, the Korean movable type preceded the European process and he argues that the burden of proof rests on those who assert an independent European invention of movable type. Other historians such as Frances Gies and Joseph Gies and A. Hyatt Mayor hold similar stances that printing was likely transmitted from China to Europe.

As with woodblock printing, Joseph P. McDermott considers the theory of transmission for movable type to be untenable and disputes that European movable type was transmitted from China. He points out that "[n]o text indicates the presence or knowledge of any kind of Asian moveable type or moveable-type imprint in Europe before 1450. The material evidence is even more conclusive." Gutenberg's production process, with the exception of the metal type, had no counterpart in traditional East Asian technology. Type molds are not described in any pre-Gutenberg Chinese record while metal-type frames in Korea were more primitive than in Europe. There are no texts indicating knowledge of Chinese movable type in Europe before 1450. There is also no archaeological evidence of Asian movable type west of Dunhuang and Turfan prior to 1450. McDermott considers both the transmission of woodblock and movable type printing to Europe to be highly conjectural. However, French scholar Henri-Jean Martin described Korean metal movable type as "[extremely similar] to Gutenberg's".

Some scholars claim that movable type was not an original invention at all and was nothing more than previous methods of creating impressions such as seals, hand stamps, and the combining of movable letters as suggested by Cicero and Jerome. John Bagford (1650/51 – 1716) argues that because Europeans did not know of the Chinese in the past, it was more likely that they took inspiration from Ancient Roman medals, seals, and marks or names at the bottom of sacrificial pots. Douglas Crawford McMurtrie argues Europeans may have learned of printing as an idea from Asia but not the process of printing.

== European movable type (1439) ==
European output of books printed by movable type from ca. 1450 to 1800

The rapid spread of printing from Mainz in the 15th century

It is traditionally surmised that Johannes Gutenberg, of the German city of Mainz, developed European movable type printing technology with the printing press around 1439 and in just over a decade, the European age of printing began. However, the evidence shows a more complex evolutionary process, spread over multiple locations. Also, Johann Fust and Peter Schöffer experimented with Gutenberg in Mainz. A finding in 2015 brought evidence of quires as claimed by extensive research, printed in 1444–1446 possibly assigned to Procopius Waldvogel.

Compared to woodblock printing, movable type page-setting was quicker and more durable. The metal type pieces were more durable and the lettering was more uniform, leading to typography and fonts. The high quality and relatively low price of the Gutenberg Bible (1455) established the superiority of movable type, and printing presses rapidly spread across Europe, leading up to the Renaissance, and later all around the world. Today, practically all movable type printing ultimately derives from Gutenberg's movable type printing, which is often regarded as the most important invention of the second millennium.

Gutenberg is also credited with the introduction of an oil-based ink which was more durable than previously used water-based inks. Having worked as a professional goldsmith, Gutenberg made skillful use of his knowledge of metals. He was also the first to make his type from an alloy of lead, tin, and antimony, known as type metal, printer's lead, or printer's metal, which was critical for producing durable type that produced high-quality printed books, and proved to be more suitable for printing than the clay, wooden or bronze types used in East Asia. To create these lead types, Gutenberg used what some considered his most ingenious invention: a special matrix which enabled the moulding of new movable types with an unprecedented precision at short notice. Within a year of printing the Gutenberg Bible, Gutenberg also published the first coloured prints.

The invention of the printing press revolutionized communication and book production, leading to the spread of knowledge. Printing was rapidly spread from Germany by emigrating German printers, but also by foreign apprentices returning home. A printing press was built in Venice in 1469; by 1500 the city had 417 printers. In 1470 Johann Heynlin set up a printing press in Paris In 1473 Kasper Straube published the Almanach cracoviense ad annum 1474 in Kraków. Dirk Martens set up a printing press in Aalst (Flanders) in 1473. He printed a book about the two lovers of Enea Piccolomini who became Pope Pius II. In 1476 a printing press was set up in England by William Caxton. The Italian Juan Pablos set up an imported press in Mexico City in 1539. In Riga, Nikolaus Mollyn established the first printing press in 1588. The first printing press in Southeast Asia was set up in the Philippines by the Spanish in 1593. The Rev. Jose Glover intended to bring the first printing press to England's American colonies in 1638, but died on the voyage, so his widow, Elizabeth Harris Glover, established the printing house, which was run by Stephen Day and became The Cambridge Press.

The Gutenberg press was much more efficient than manual copying. It remained largely unchanged in the eras of John Baskerville and Giambattista Bodoni, over 300 years later. By 1800, Lord Stanhope had constructed a press completely from cast iron, reducing the force required by 90% while doubling the size of the printed area. While Stanhope's "mechanical theory" had improved the efficiency of the press, it was only capable of 250 sheets per hour. German printer Friedrich Koenig was the first to design a non-manpowered machine—using steam. He moved to London in 1804, and met Thomas Bensley; he secured financial support for his project in 1807. With a patent in 1810, Koenig designed a steam press "much like a hand press connected to a steam engine." The first production trial of this model occurred in April 1811.

=== Flat-bed printing press ===
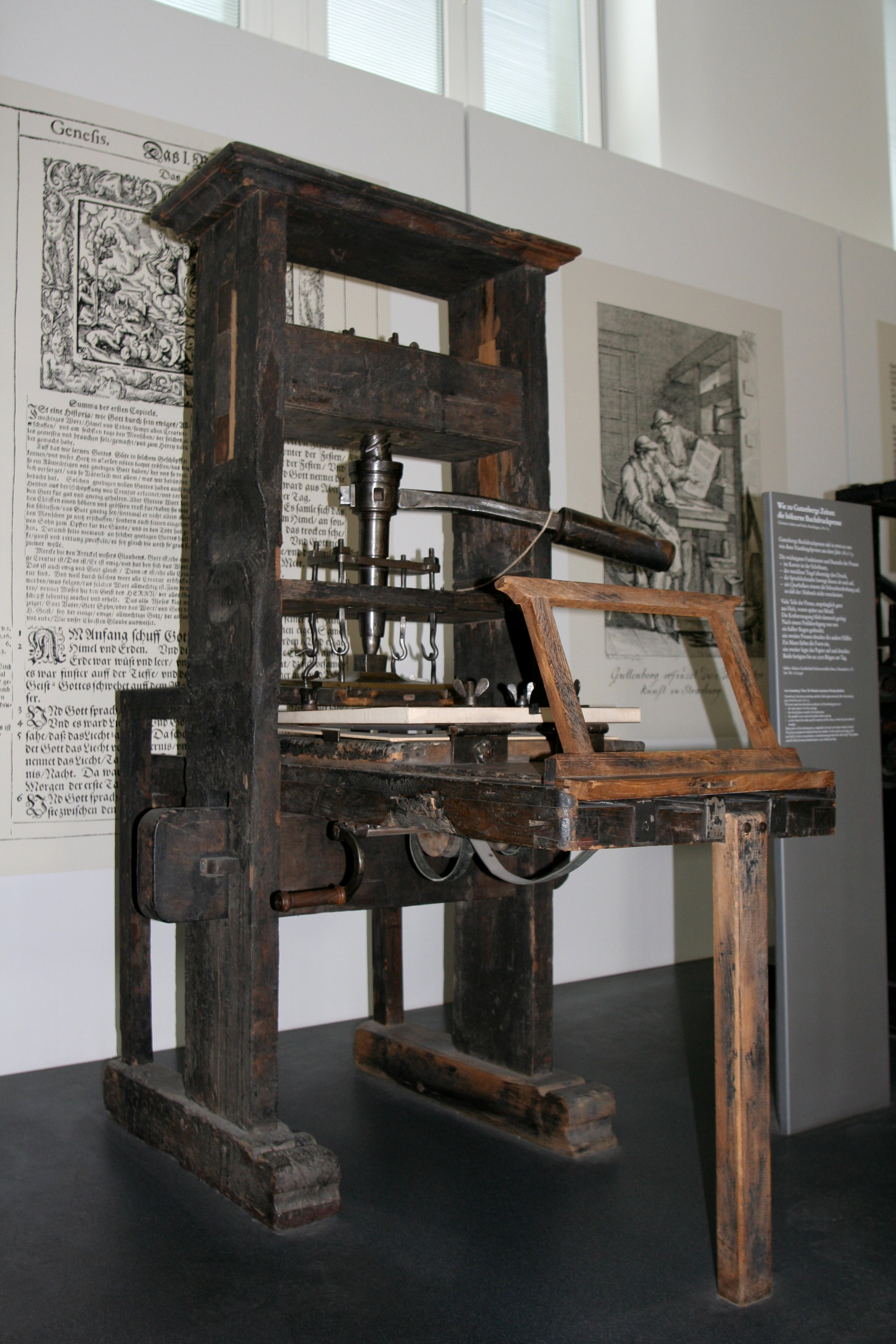
Printing press from 1811, photographed in Munich, Germany

A printing press is a mechanical device for applying pressure to an inked surface resting upon a medium (such as paper or cloth), thereby transferring an image. The systems involved were first assembled in Germany by the goldsmith Johannes Gutenberg in the mid-15th century. Printing methods based on Gutenberg's printing press spread rapidly throughout first Europe and then the rest of the world, replacing most block printing and making it the sole progenitor of modern movable type printing. As a method of creating reproductions for mass consumption, the printing press has been superseded by the advent of offset printing.

Johannes Gutenberg's work in the printing press began in approximately 1436 when he partnered with Andreas Dritzehen—a man he had previously instructed in gem-cutting—and Andreas Heilmann, owner of a paper mill. It was not until a 1439 lawsuit against Gutenberg that official record exists; witnesses testimony discussed type, an inventory of metals (including lead) and his type mold.

Others in Europe were developing movable type at this time, including goldsmith Procopius Waldvogel of France and Laurens Janszoon Coster of the Netherlands. They are not known to have contributed specific advances to the printing press. While the Encyclopædia Britannica Eleventh Edition had attributed the invention of the printing press to Coster, the company now states that is incorrect.

In this woodblock print from 1568, the printer at left is removing a page from the press while the one at right inks the forme.

=== Printing houses in Europe ===
Early printing houses (near the time of Gutenberg) were run by "master printers". These printers owned shops, selected and edited manuscripts, determined the sizes of print runs, sold the works they produced, raised capital and organized distribution. Some master printing houses, like that of Aldus Manutius, became the cultural center for literati such as Erasmus.

- Print shop apprentices: Apprentices, usually between the ages of 15 and 20, worked for master printers. Apprentices were not required to be literate, and literacy rates at the time were very low, in comparison to today. Apprentices prepared ink, dampened sheets of paper, and assisted at the press. An apprentice who wished to learn to become a compositor had to learn Latin and spend time under the supervision of a journeyman.
- Journeyman printers: After completing their apprenticeships, journeyman printers were free to move employers. This facilitated the spread of printing to areas that were less print-centred.
- Compositors: Those who set the type for printing.
- Pressmen: the person who worked the press. This was physically labour-intensive.

The earliest-known image of a European, Gutenberg-style print shop is the Dance of Death by Matthias Huss, at Lyon, 1499. This image depicts a compositor standing at a compositor's case being grabbed by a skeleton. The case is raised to facilitate his work. At the right of the printing house a bookshop is shown.

==== Financial aspects ====
According to court records from the city of Mainz, Johannes Fust was for some time Gutenberg's financial backer. By the 16th century jobs in printing were becoming increasingly specialized. Structures supporting publishers were more and more complex, leading to division of labour. In Europe between 1500 and 1700 the role of the Master Printer was dying out and giving way to the bookseller—publisher. During this period, printing had a stronger commercial imperative than previously. Risks associated with the industry however were substantial, although dependent on the nature of the publication.

Bookseller publishers negotiated at trade fairs and at print shops. Jobbing work appeared: some printers performed menial tasks at the beginning of their careers to support themselves.

From 1500 to 1700 publishers developed several new methods of funding projects:

1. Subscription publishing: pioneered by the English in the early 17th century. A prospectus for a publication was drawn up by a publisher to raise funding. The prospectus was given to potential buyers who signed up for a copy. If there were not enough subscriptions the publication did not go ahead. Lists of subscribers were included in the books as endorsements. If enough people subscribed, there might be a reprint. Some authors used subscription publication to bypass the publisher entirely.
2. Installment publishing: books were issued in parts until a complete book had been issued. This was not necessarily done within a fixed time period. It was an effective method of spreading the cost over a period of time. It also allowed earlier returns on investment to help cover the production costs of subsequent installments.

The Mechanick Exercises, by Joseph Moxon, in London, 1683, was said to be the first publication in installments.

Publishing trade organizations allowed publishers to organize business concerns collectively. These arrangements included systems of self-regulation. For example, if one publisher did something to irritate other publishers he would be controlled by peer pressure. Such systems are known as cartels, and are in most countries now considered to be in restraint of trade. These arrangements helped deal with labour unrest among journeymen, who faced difficult working conditions. Brotherhoods predated unions, without the formal regulations now associated with unions.

In most cases, publishers bought the copyright in a work from the author, and made some arrangement about the possible profits. This required a substantial amount of capital in addition to that needed for the physical equipment and staff. Alternatively, an author with some capital available would sometimes keep the copyright himself, and simply pay the printer to print the book.

==== Rotary printing press ====
In a rotary printing press, the impressions are carved around a cylinder so that the printing can be done on long continuous rolls of paper, cardboard, plastic, or a large number of other substrates. Rotary drum printing was invented by Josiah Warren in 1832, whose design was later imitated by Richard March Hoe in 1843, patented in 1847, and then significantly improved by William Bullock in 1863.

== Intaglio ==
Intaglio printing. The top line is the paper, to which a slightly raised layer of ink adheres; the matrix is beneath.

Intaglio (/ɪnˈtælioʊ/) is a family of printmaking techniques in which the image is incised into a surface, known as the matrix or plate. Normally, copper or zinc plates are used as a surface, and the incisions are created by etching, engraving, drypoint, aquatint or mezzotint. Collographs may also be printed as intaglio plates. To print an intaglio plate the surface is covered in thick ink and then rubbed with tarlatan cloth to remove most of the excess. The final smooth wipe is usually done by hand, sometimes with the aid of newspaper or old public phone book pages, leaving ink only in the incisions. A damp piece of paper is placed on top and the plate and paper are run through a printing press that, through pressure, transfers the ink from the recesses of the plate to the paper.

== Lithography (1796) ==
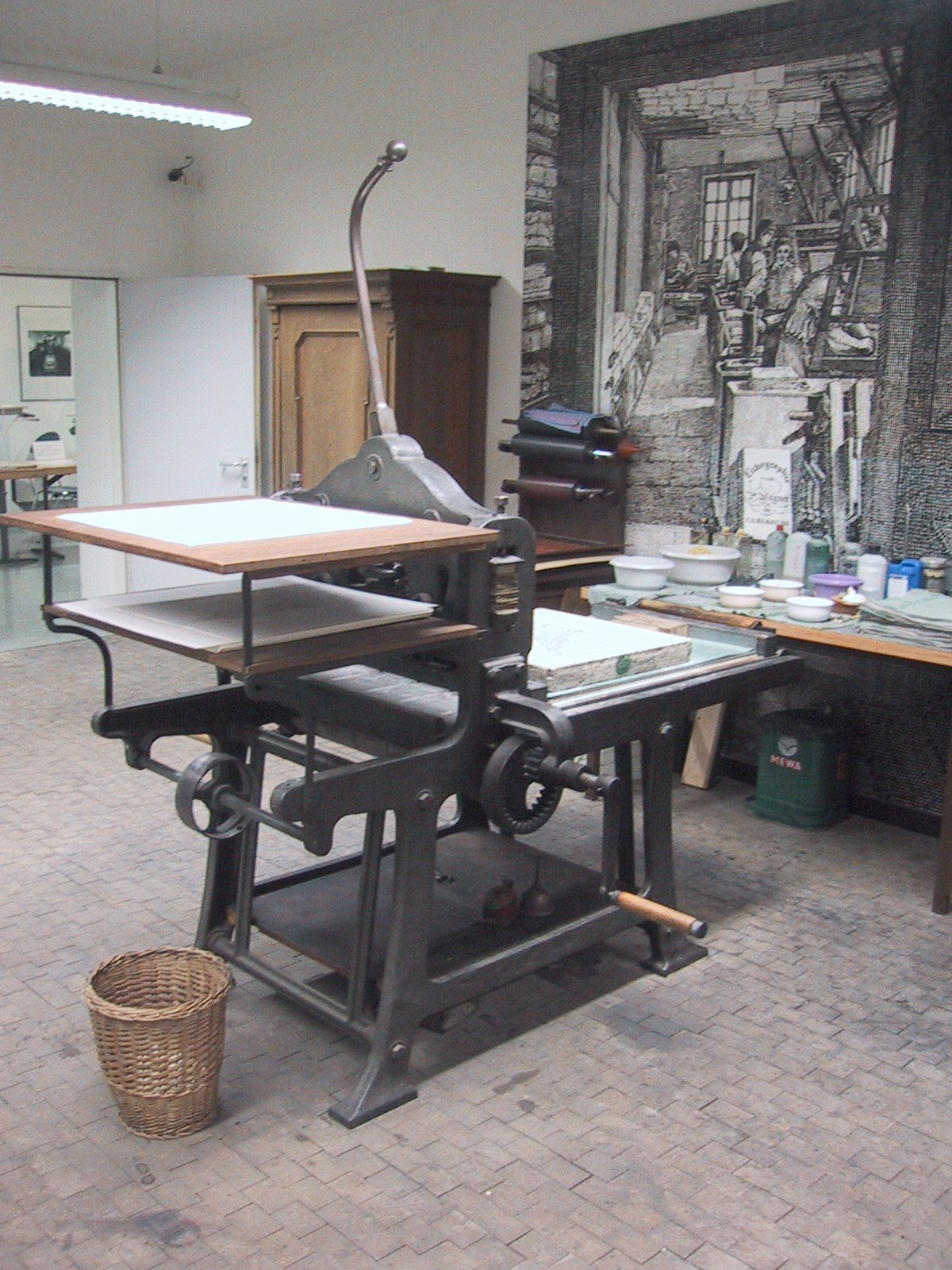
Lithography press for printing maps in Munich

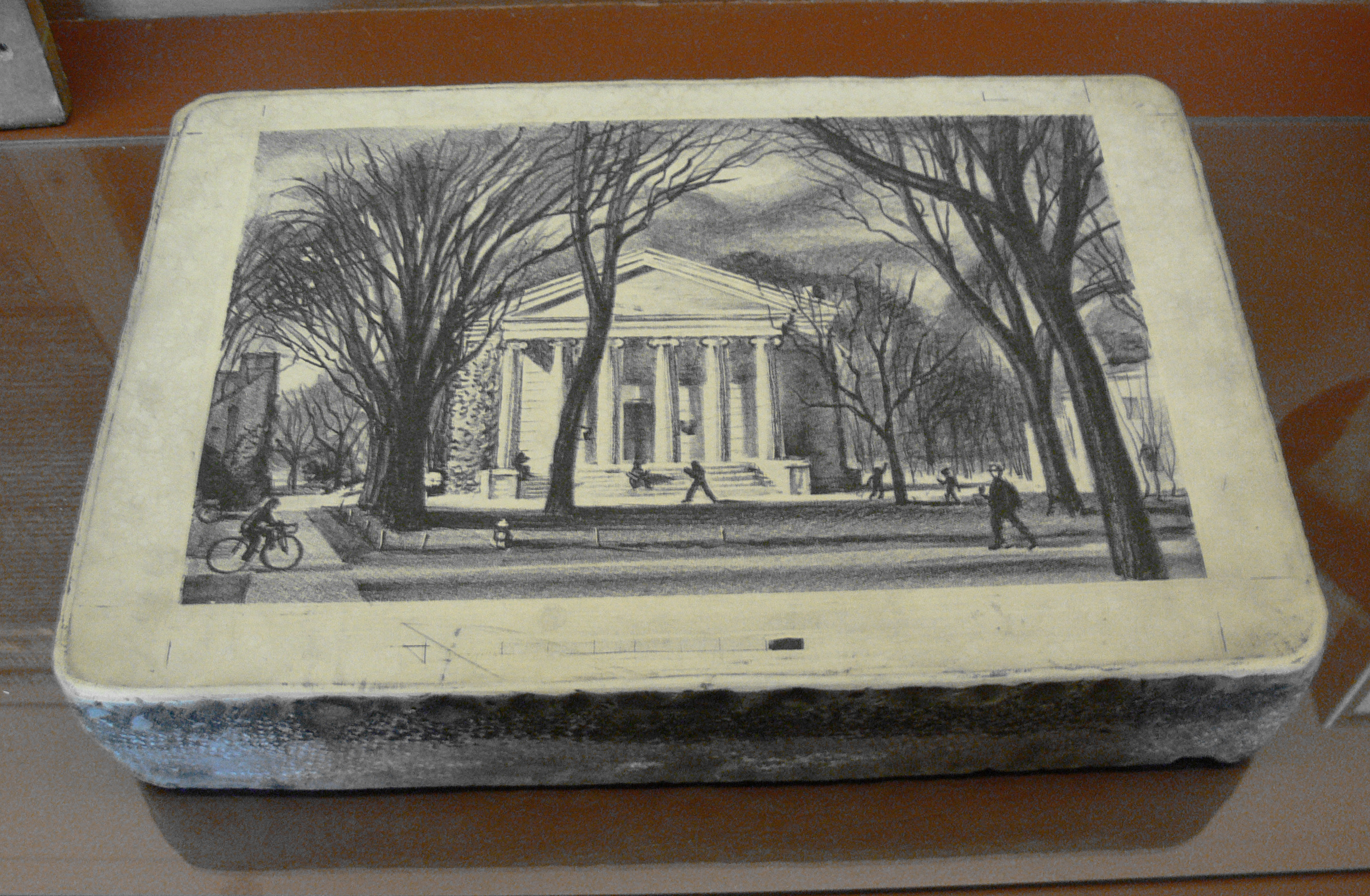
Stone used for a lithograph with a view of Princeton University (Collection: Princeton University Library, NJ)

Invented by Bavarian author Alois Senefelder in 1796, lithography is a method for printing on a smooth surface. Lithography is a printing process that uses chemical processes to create an image. For instance, the positive part of an image would be a hydrophobic chemical, while the negative image would be water. Thus, when the plate is introduced to a compatible ink and water mixture, the ink will adhere to the positive image and the water will clean the negative image. This allows for a relatively flat print plate which allows for much longer runs than the older physical methods of imaging (e.g., embossing or engraving). High-volume lithography is used today to produce posters, maps, books, newspapers, and packaging — just about any smooth, mass-produced item with print and graphics on it. Most books, indeed all types of high-volume text, are now printed using offset lithography.

In offset lithography, which depends on photographic processes, flexible aluminum, polyester, mylar or paper printing plates are used in place of stone tablets. Modern printing plates have a brushed or roughened texture and are covered with a photosensitive emulsion. A photographic negative of the desired image is placed in contact with the emulsion and the plate is exposed to ultraviolet light. After development, the emulsion shows a reverse of the negative image, which is thus a duplicate of the original (positive) image. The image on the plate emulsion can also be created through direct laser imaging in a CTP (Computer-To-Plate) device called a platesetter. The positive image is the emulsion that remains after imaging. For many years, chemicals have been used to remove the non-image emulsion, but now plates are available that do not require chemical processing.

== Color printing ==
Calvert Lithographic Company, Detroit, MI. Uncle Sam Supplying the World with Berry Brothers Hard Oil Finish, c. 1880. Noel Wisdom Chromolithograph Collection, Special Collections Department, the University of South Florida Tampa Library.

According to Michael Sullivan, the earliest known example of color printing "is a two-color frontispiece to a Buddhist sutra scroll, dated 1346". Color printing continued to be used in China throughout the Ming and Qing dynasty.

Chromolithography became the most successful of several methods of colour printing developed by the 19th century; other methods were developed by printers such as Jacob Christoph Le Blon, George Baxter and Edmund Evans, and mostly relied on using several woodblocks with the colors. Hand-coloring also remained important; elements of the official British Ordnance Survey maps were colored by hand by boys until 1875. Chromolithography developed from lithography and the term covers various types of lithography that are printed in color. The initial technique involved the use of multiple lithographic stones, one for each color, and was still extremely expensive when done for the best quality results. Depending on the number of colors present, a chromolithograph could take months to produce, by very skilled workers. However much cheaper prints could be produced by simplifying both the number of colors used, and the refinement of the detail in the image. Cheaper images, like the advertisement illustrated, relied heavily on an initial black print (not always a lithograph), on which colors were then overprinted. To make an expensive reproduction print as what was once referred to as a "'chromo'", a lithographer, with a finished painting in front of him, gradually created and corrected the many stones using proofs to look as much as possible like the painting in front of him, sometimes using dozens of layers.

Aloys Senefelder, the inventor of lithography, introduced the subject of colored lithography in his 1818 Vollstaendiges Lehrbuch der Steindruckerey (A Complete Course of Lithography), where he told of his plans to print using color and explained the colors he wished to be able to print someday. Although Senefelder recorded plans for chromolithography, printers in other countries, such as [France and England, were also trying to find a new way to print in color. Godefroy Engelmann of Mulhouse in France was awarded a patent on chromolithography in July 1837, but there are disputes over whether chromolithography was already in use before this date, as some sources say, pointing to areas of printing such as the production of playing cards.

== Offset press (1870s) ==
A modern offset printing press at the Las Vegas Review-Journal, installed in 2000

Offset printing is a widely used printing technique where the inked image is transferred (or "offset") from a plate to a rubber blanket, then to the printing surface. When used in combination with the lithographic process, which is based on the repulsion of oil and water, the offset technique employs a flat (planographic) image carrier on which the image to be printed obtains ink from ink rollers, while the non-printing area attracts a film of water, keeping the non-printing areas ink-free.

== Screenprinting (1907) ==
Screenprinting has its origins in simple stencilling, most notably of the Japanese form (katazome) user who cut banana leaves and inserted ink through the design holes on textiles, mostly for clothing. This was taken up in France. The modern screenprinting process originated from patents taken out by Samuel Simon in 1907 in England. This idea was then adopted in San Francisco, California, by John Pilsworth in 1914 who used screenprinting to form multicolor prints in a subtractive mode, differing from screenprinting as it is done today.

== Flexography ==
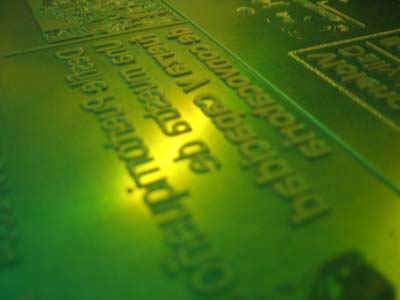
A flexographic printing plate

Flexography (also called "surface printing"), often abbreviated to "flexo", is a method of printing most commonly used for packaging (labels, tape, bags, boxes, banners, and so on).

A flexo print is achieved by creating a mirrored master of the required image as a 3D relief in a rubber or polymer material. A measured amount of ink is deposited upon the surface of the printing plate (or printing cylinder) using an anilox roll. The print surface then rotates, contacting the print material which transfers the ink.

Originally flexo printing was basic in quality. Labels requiring high quality have generally been printed by offset printing until recently. Great advances have been made to the quality of flexo printing presses.

== Phototypesetting ==
Phototypesetting is a method of setting type which uses photography to make columns of type on a scroll of photographic paper.

== Dot matrix printer (1968) ==
A dot matrix printer or impact matrix printer is a type of computer printer with a print head that runs back and forth on the page and prints by impact, striking an ink-soaked cloth ribbon against the paper, much like a typewriter. Unlike a typewriter or daisy wheel printer, letters are drawn out of a dot matrix, and thus, varied fonts and arbitrary graphics can be produced. Because the printing involves mechanical pressure, these printers can create carbon copies and carbonless copies.

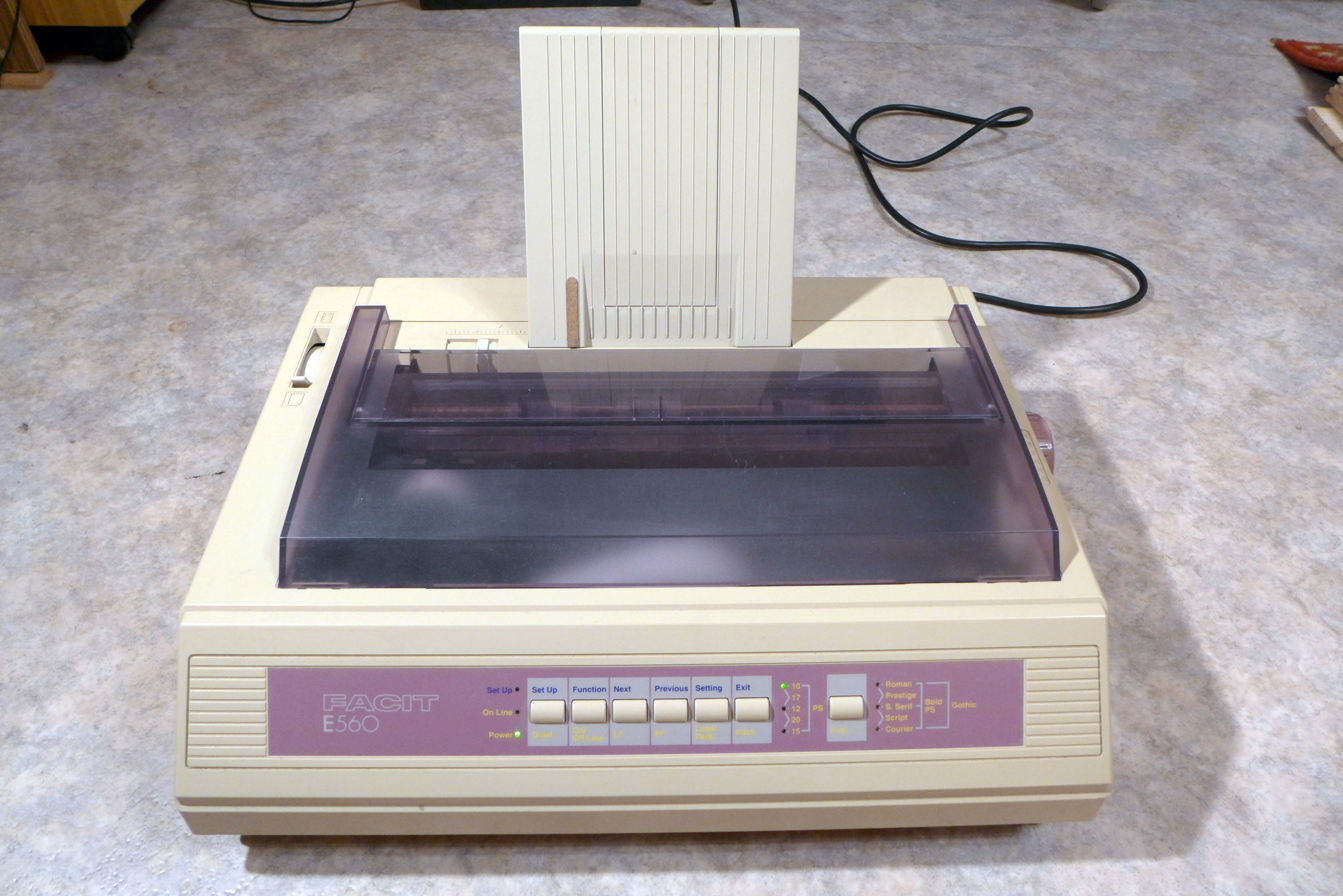
A Facit E560 dot matrix printer

Each dot is produced by a tiny metal rod, also called a "wire" or "pin", which is driven forward by the power of a tiny electromagnet or solenoid, either directly or through small levers (pawls). Facing the ribbon and the paper is a small guide plate (often made of an artificial jewel such as sapphire or ruby) pierced with holes to serve as guides for the pins. The moving portion of the printer is called the print head, and when running the printer as a generic text device generally prints one line of text at a time. Most dot matrix printers have a single vertical line of dot-making equipment on their print heads; others have a few interleaved rows in order to improve dot density.

The first dot-matrix printers were invented in Japan. In 1968, Japanese manufacturer Epson released the EP-101, the world's first dot-matrix printer. The same year, Japanese manufacturer OKI introduced the first serial impact dot matrix printer (SIDM), the OKI Wiredot.

== Thermal printer ==
A thermal printer (or direct thermal printer) produces a printed image by selectively heating coated thermochromic paper, or thermal paper as it is commonly known, when the paper passes over the thermal print head. The coating turns black in the areas where it is heated, producing an image.

== Laser printer (1969) ==
The laser printer, based on a modified xerographic copier, was invented at Xerox in 1969 by researcher Gary Starkweather, who had a fully functional networked printer system working by 1971. Laser printing eventually became a multibillion-dollar business for Xerox.

The first commercial implementation of a laser printer was the IBM 3800 in 1976, used for high-volume printing of documents such as invoices and mailing labels. It is often cited as "taking up a whole room," implying that it was a primitive version of the later familiar device used with a personal computer. While large, it was designed for an entirely different purpose. Many 3800s are still in use.

The first laser printer designed for use with an individual computer was released with the Xerox Star 8010 in 1981. Although it was innovative, the Star was an expensive ($17,000) system that was only purchased by a small number of laboratories and institutions. After personal computers became more widespread, the first laser printer intended for a mass market was the Hewlett-Packard LaserJet 8ppm, released in 1984, using a Canon engine controlled by HP software. The HP LaserJet printer was quickly followed by other laser printers from Brother Industries, IBM, and others.

Most noteworthy was the role the laser printer played in popularizing desktop publishing with the introduction of the Apple LaserWriter for the Apple Macintosh, along with Aldus PageMaker software, in 1985. With these products, users could create documents that would previously have required professional typesetting.

== Inkjet printer ==
Inkjet printers are a type of computer printer that operates by propelling tiny droplets of liquid ink onto paper. There are two types of inkjet technologies: Continuous and Drop-On-Demand.

Continuous inkjet flows a continuous pressurized stream of ink toward a paper. Electrically charged droplets are deflected by an electrical field to print on paper or go into a basin and reused.

Drop-On-Demand inkjets propel single drops with each electrical pulse.

Hot-melt inks were introduced in 1984. Hot-melt inks printed in full color.

== Dye-sublimation printer ==
A dye-sublimation printer (or dye-sub printer) is a computer printer which employs a printing process that uses heat to transfer dye to a medium such as a plastic card, printer paper or poster paper. The process is usually to lay one color at a time using a ribbon that has color panels. Most dye-sublimation printers use CMYO colors which differs from the more recognized CMYK colors in that the black dye is eliminated in favour of a clear overcoating. This overcoating (which has numerous names depending on the manufacturer) is effectively a thin laminate which protects the print from discoloration from UV light and the air while also rendering the print water-resistant. Many consumer and professional dye-sublimation printers are designed and used for producing photographic prints.

== Digital press (1993) ==
Digital printing is the reproduction of digital images on a physical surface, such as common or photographic paper or paperboard-cover stock, film, cloth, plastic, vinyl, magnets, and labels.

It can be differentiated from litho, flexography, gravure or letterpress printing in many ways, some of which are;

- Every impression made onto the paper can be different, as opposed to making several hundred or thousand impressions of the same image from one set of printing plates, as in traditional methods.
- The ink or toner does not absorb into the substrate, as does conventional ink, but forms a layer on the surface and may be fused to the substrate by using an inline fuser fluid with heat process (toner) or UV curing process (ink).
- It generally requires less waste in terms of chemicals used and paper wasted in set up or makeready (bringing the image "up to color" and checking position).
- It is excellent for rapid prototyping, or small print runs which means that it is more accessible to a wider range of designers and more cost effective in short runs.

== 3D printing ==
Three-dimensional printing is a method of converting a virtual 3D model into a physical object. 3D printing is a category of rapid prototyping technology. 3D printers typically work by 'printing' successive layers on top of the previous to build up a three dimensional object. 3D printers are generally faster, more affordable and easier to use than other additive fabrication technologies.

== Technological developments ==
=== Woodcut ===
Woodcut is a relief printing artistic technique in printmaking in which an image is carved into the surface of a block of wood, with the printing parts remaining level with the surface while the non-printing parts are removed, typically with gouges. The areas to show 'white' are cut away with a knife or chisel, leaving the characters or image to show in 'black' at the original surface level. The block is cut along the grain of the wood (unlike wood engraving where the block is cut in the end-grain). In Europe beechwood was most commonly used; in Japan, a special type of cherry wood was popular.

Woodcut first appeared in ancient China. From 6th century onward, woodcut icons became popular and especially flourished in Chinese Buddhism. Since the 10th century, woodcut pictures appeared as illustrations in Chinese books, on banknotes such as Jiaozi (currency), and as single sheet images. Woodcut New Year pictures are also very popular with the Chinese.

In China and Tibet printed images mostly remained tied as illustrations to accompanying text until the modern period. The earliest woodblock printed book, the Diamond Sutra contains a large image as frontispiece, and many Buddhist texts contain some images. Later some notable Chinese artists designed woodcuts for books, the individual print develop in China in the form of New Year picture as an art-form in the way it did in Europe and Japan.

In Europe, woodcut is the oldest technique used for old master prints, developing c. 1400, by using on paper existing techniques for printing on cloth. The explosion of sales of cheap woodcuts in the middle of the century led to a fall in standards, and many popular prints were very crude. The development of hatching followed on rather later than in engraving. Michael Wolgemut was significant in making German woodcut more sophisticated from about 1475, and Erhard Reuwich was the first to use cross-hatching (far harder to do than in engraving or etching). Both of these produced mainly book-illustrations, as did various Italian artists who were also raising standards there at the same period. At the end of the century Albrecht Dürer brought the Western woodcut to a level that has never been surpassed, and greatly increased the status of the single-leaf (i.e. an image sold separately) woodcut.

=== Engraving ===
Engraving is the practice of incising a design onto a hard, flat surface, by cutting grooves into it. The result may be a decorated object in itself, as when silver, gold or steel are engraved, or may provide an intaglio printing plate, of copper or another metal, for printing images on paper, which are called engravings. Engraving was a historically important method of producing images on paper, both in artistic printmaking, and also for commercial reproductions and illustrations for books and magazines. It has long been replaced by commercial photography, and is much less common in printmaking, partly because of its difficulty. It has been largely replaced by etching and other techniques. Other terms often used for engravings are copper-plate engraving and Line engraving. These should all mean exactly the same, but especially in the past were often used very loosely to cover several printmaking techniques, so that many so-called engravings were in fact produced by totally different techniques, such as etching.

In antiquity, the only engraving that could be carried out is evident in the shallow grooves found in some jewellery during the 1st millennium BCE. The majority of so-called engraved designs on ancient gold rings or other items were produced by chasing or sometimes a combination of lost-wax casting and chasing.

In the European Middle Ages goldsmiths used engraving to decorate and inscribe metalwork. It is thought that they began to print impressions of their designs to record them. From this grew the engraving of copper printing plates to produce artistic images on paper, known as old master prints in Germany in the 1430s; Italy soon followed. Many early engravers came from a goldsmithing background. The first and greatest period of the engraving was from about 1470 to 1530, with such masters as Martin Schongauer, Albrecht Dürer, and Lucas van Leiden.

=== Etching ===
Etching is the process of using strong acid or mordant to cut into the unprotected parts of a metal surface to create a design in intaglio in the metal (the original process—in modern manufacturing other chemicals may be used on other types of material). As an intaglio method of printmaking it is, along with engraving, the most important technique for old master prints, and remains widely used today.

=== Halftoning ===
Halftone is the reprographic technique that simulates ones it is continuous tone imagery through the use of equally spaced dots of varying size. 'Halftone' can also be used to refer specifically to the image that is produced by this process.

The idea of halftone printing originates from William Fox Talbot. In the early 1850s he suggested using "photographic screens or veils" in connection with a photographic intaglio process.

Several different kinds of screens were proposed during the following decades, but the first half-tone photo-engraving process was invented by Canadians George-Édouard Desbarats and William Leggo Jr. On October 30, 1869, Desbarats published the Canadian Illustrated News which became the world's first periodical to successfully employ this photo-mechanical technique; featuring a full page half-tone image of His Royal Highness Prince Arthur, from a photograph by Notman. Ambitious to exploit a much larger circulation, Debarats and Leggo went to New York and launched the New York Daily Graphic in March 1873, which became the world's first illustrated daily.

The first truly successful commercial method was patented by Frederic Ives of Philadelphia in 1881. But although he found a way of breaking up the image into dots of varying sizes he did not make use of a screen. In 1882 the German George Meisenbach patented a halftone process in England. His invention was based on the previous ideas of Berchtold and Swan. He used single lined screens which were turned during exposure to produce cross-lined effects. He was the first to achieve any commercial success with relief halftones.

=== Xerography ===
Xerography (or electrophotography) is a photocopying technique developed by Chester Carlson in 1938 and patented on October 6, 1942. He received U.S. patent 2,297,691 for his invention. The name xerography came from the Greek radicals xeros (dry) and graphos (writing), because there are no liquid chemicals involved in the process, unlike earlier reproduction techniques like cyanotype.

In 1938 Bulgarian physicist Georgi Nadjakov found that when placed into electric field and exposed to light, some dielectrics acquire permanent electric polarization in the exposed areas. That polarization persists in the dark and is destroyed in light. Chester Carlson, the inventor of photocopying, was originally a patent attorney and part-time researcher and inventor. His job at the patent office in New York City required him to make a large number of copies of important papers. Carlson, who was arthritic, found this a painful and tedious process. This prompted him to conduct experiments with photoconductivity. Carlson experimented with "electrophotography" in his kitchen and in 1938, applied for a patent for the process. He made the first "photocopy" using a zinc plate covered with sulfur. The words "10-22-38 Astoria" were written on a microscope slide, which was placed on top of more sulfur and under a bright light. After the slide was removed, a mirror image of the words remained. Carlson tried to sell his invention to some companies, but because the process was still underdeveloped he failed. At the time multiple copies were made using carbon paper or duplicating machines and people did not feel the need for an electronic machine. Between 1939 and 1944, Carlson was turned down by over 20 companies, including IBM and General Electric, neither of which believed there was a significant market for copiers.

== See also ==
- Early American publishers and printers
- Global spread of the printing press
- History of the alphabet
- History of books
- History of graphic design
- History of paper
- History of photography
- History of writing
- Museum of Printing
- Printing and the Mind of Man
- RIT Cary Graphic Arts Collection (rare book library with extensive collections on the history of printing and typography)

== Bibliography ==
- Barker, Nicolas. "Printing and the Mind of Man." 2013. The Book Collector 62 (3) Autumn: 371–83.
- Barrett, Timothy Hugh (2008), The Woman Who Discovered Printing, Great Britain: Yale University Press, ISBN 978-0-300-12728-7 (alk. paper)
- Berry, W. Turner; Poole, H. Edmund (1966), Annals of Printing: A Chronological Encyclopaedia From the Earliest Times to 1950, Blandford Press
- Bulliet, R. W. (1987). "Medieval Arabic Ṭarsh: A Forgotten Chapter in the History of Printing". Journal of the American Oriental Society. 107 (3): 427–438. doi:10.2307/603463. JSTOR 603463.
- Chia, Lucille (2011), Knowledge and Text Production in an Age of Print: China, 900-1400, Brill
- Condorelli, Marco (2022), Standardising English Spelling: The Role of Printing on Sixteenth and Seventeenth-Century Graphemic Developments, Great Britain: Cambridge University Press, doi:10.1017/9781009099912, ISBN 978-1-00-909991-2, S2CID 247900493
- Library of Congress. (1939). Colonial Printing in Mexico: Catalog of an exhibition held at the Library of Congress in 1939 commemorating the four hundredth anniversary of printing in the New World. U.S. G.P.O.
- McDermott, Joseph P. (2006), A Social History of the Chinese Book
- McMurtrie, Douglas C. (1962), THE BOOK: The Story of Printing & Bookmaking, Oxford University Press, seventh edition
- Moxon, Joseph. Mechanick Exercises on the Whole Art of Printing (1683–4), ed. Herbert Davis and Harry Carter (London:Oxford University Press, 1958).
- Qi, Han (2015), Lecture 2 Printing, Springer
- Richardson, Kristina (2021). Roma in the Medieval Islamic World: Literacy, Culture, and Migration. Bloomsbury Academic.
- Tsien, Tsuen-Hsuin (1985), Paper and Printing, Science and Civilization in China, vol. 5, Cambridge University Press, ISBN 0-521-08690-6
- Twitchett, Denis (1998b), The Cambridge History of China Volume 8 The Ming Dynasty, 1368–1644, Part 2, Cambridge University Press
- Wilkinson, Endymion (2012), Chinese History: A New Manual, Harvard University Asia Center for the Harvard-Yenching Institute
