= William A. Jackson (bibliographer) =

American bibliographer and librarian (1905–1964)

William Alexander Jackson
- Born: July 25, 1905; Bellows Falls, Rockingham, Vermont, US
- Died: October 18, 1964 (aged 59); Boston, Massachusetts, US
- Occupations: Bibliographer, librarian
- Employer: Harvard University
- Known for: First librarian of the Houghton Library; second edition of the Short-Title Catalogue
- Spouse: Dorothy Judd
- Children: 1

William Alexander Jackson (July 25, 1905 – October 18, 1964) was an American bibliographer and librarian. He was the first librarian of the Houghton Library, Harvard University's rare book and manuscript library, from its opening in 1942 until his death, and was professor of bibliography at Harvard from 1938.

Jackson compiled, with Emma Virginia Unger, the catalogue of the private library of the collector Carl H. Pforzheimer, and later undertook the second edition of A. W. Pollard and G. R. Redgrave's A Short-Title Catalogue of Books Printed in England, Scotland, & Ireland and of English Books Printed Abroad, 1475–1640 with the British bibliographer F. S. Ferguson. The revision grew out of an interleaved copy Jackson began annotating as an undergraduate in 1926; it was unfinished at his death and was completed by Katharine F. Pantzer.

== Early life and education ==
Jackson was born in 1905 at Bellows Falls, Vermont, a village in the town of Rockingham, the son of Alice Mary (Fleming) and the Rev. Charles Wilfred Jackson, a Baptist clergyman who moved first to Canada and then to a parish in South Pasadena, California.

Jackson began his schooling in South Pasadena, where he read widely at the public library and came under the influence of the writings of A. Edward Newton, particularly The Amenities of Book-Collecting (1918). He grew up in the town next to the newly established Huntington Library, and his connection with it began when he cut the grass at the house of a neighbour, George Watson Cole, the Huntington's first librarian; as his interest became apparent he was given access usually reserved for mature scholars.

He graduated from South Pasadena High School in 1922 and, on Cole's advice, matriculated at Williams College, entering with the class of 1927. Alfred Clark Chapin had recently placed his collection of some twelve thousand volumes, mainly of English literature, in the college library, and Jackson soon spent eight or more hours a day working in the Chapin Library under its librarian, Lucy Eugenia Osborne — partly from interest and partly because he was putting himself through college. He was a member of Alpha Delta Phi, edited the college magazine, was Ivy Poet for his class, and graduated in June 1927 with final honours in English literature.

In the summer of 1926 Jackson travelled to England, making his first visits to the Bodleian Library and the British Museum and meeting the bibliographers W. W. Greg, R. B. McKerrow, and Seymour de Ricci. The Bibliographical Society had just published Pollard and Redgrave's Short-Title Catalogue; Jackson bought a copy at once, had it interleaved, and began entering the annotations that eventually filled every page. On the voyage out he met Dorothy Judd of Honolulu, whom he married three years later.

== The Chapin Library catalogue ==
From 1927 Jackson stayed on at Williams as a cataloguing assistant at the Chapin Library, working on a full descriptive catalogue of the collection rather than towards a master's degree. As he described it in 1928, the catalogue was to treat some fifteen hundred volumes printed in England before 1641, or printed in English on the Continent before that date, recording variant issues, distinguishing editions printed in the same shop within a few years of each other, identifying the printers of anonymously printed books, and supplying a bibliographical index of printing practices. The scale of the work was such that Yale University agreed to accept it as his dissertation for the doctorate in English philology.

Jackson married Dorothy Judd in Honolulu in August 1929, and the couple settled first in Altadena, California, and then in New Haven, Connecticut, where the catalogue was to be printed. Early in 1930, however, the onset of the Depression led Chapin to cancel the printing. The text was complete and survives in typescript at Williamstown, but it has never been published; the printed record of the collection is instead the simpler check-list issued by Lucy Eugenia Osborne in 1939.

== Pforzheimer Library ==
In 1930 Jackson became librarian of the private library assembled in New York City by the financier and collector Carl H. Pforzheimer, a post he held until 1938. The association produced a three-volume catalogue of the collection, prepared with Emma Virginia Unger, designed by Frederic Warde and Bruce Rogers, and published in 1940. Bond, comparing it with the unpublished Chapin catalogue, found the same underlying principles at work: meticulous description of each book, close analysis of its bibliographical features, a summary of its publishing history, and notes on copies elsewhere. Jackson's obituarist in The New York Times described the completed work as a model and a monument of bibliographical scholarship.

Jackson spent the year 1933–34 in England with his family, both to work in English collections and to represent Pforzheimer in the London book market; it was his longest continuous residence abroad. He joined the Grolier Club in 1931 and The Bibliographical Society in 1932, becoming the latter's honorary secretary for America in 1936. He made his public debut as a scholar before a meeting of the Grolier Club on December 19, 1935, reading a paper on Thomas Frognall Dibdin. In the summer of 1938 he made an extended bibliophilic tour of England with Philip Hofer and Boies Penrose.

In 1938 Jackson was awarded a Guggenheim Fellowship for studies in the history of English printing, particularly for the period 1603 to 1640.

== Harvard and the Houghton Library ==
Jackson's appointment at Harvard was settled early in 1938 through an exchange of letters between Charles Warren, chairman of the Board of Overseers' committee on the library, and Keyes D. Metcalf, director of the Harvard University Library. The post — assistant librarian in charge of the Treasure Room and associate professor of bibliography — was newly created, and Warren questioned the need for a new professorship; Metcalf replied that the library's greatest single need was for a bibliographer and scholar in the broad sense, and that in Jackson he had an ideal candidate. Philip Hofer was appointed curator of printing and graphic arts at the same time.

=== Building the library ===
The Treasure Room then occupied a reading room in the Widener Library, with a portion of the adjacent stack shut off for rare book storage; the space was barely adequate and the storage conditions poor, and further expansion was possible only at the expense of Widener's own stacks. At a meeting of the Visiting Committee in February 1940, Arthur Amory Houghton Jr. offered to fund an entirely new building. A site east of Widener was chosen and the architects Perry, Shaw and Hepburn engaged; excavation began in October 1940, the building was largely complete before the end of 1941, and the Houghton Library formally opened on February 28, 1942, with Jackson as its first librarian.

Jackson gave close personal attention to every feature of the building, from the specially manufactured metal shelving, designed so that no rough edge could injure a binding, to the routes through the building, which he traced on the blueprints to ensure that one could always turn on the lights ahead and turn off those behind without retracing one's steps. Bond considered that when it opened it could be called without boasting the most advanced library building in the United States, and that its basic principles remained standard for the design of rare-book libraries a quarter of a century later.

=== Collecting ===
Jackson's annual reports of accessions, twenty-two in all, began to appear in 1942 and record his collecting in detail. Working with very limited endowed income, he relied heavily on gifts in cash and in kind, and became adept at matching donors to purchases. He was a pioneer in collecting literary archives for a university library at a time when the practice was unusual, securing the deposit of the Emerson and Longfellow papers, material from the descendants of Holmes, Lowell, Melville, Alcott, Higginson, Aldrich, and Howells, and the funds to purchase the Emily Dickinson papers. Beyond early English printing, he was credited with building the library's holdings in early printed European literature, early maps, and the history of science. The collections more than trebled during his time at Harvard, and the number of readers using the library increased threefold during his administration. On awarding him an honorary doctorate, the university called him "Our Grand Acquisitor".

Acquisitions during his tenure included a large body of Tennyson manuscripts announced in February 1956, comprising some 650 drafts of 350 poems. In 1939 he travelled to New York to accept from Benny Goodman a gift of a hundred gramophone records and other material on swing music, to be known as the Harvard–Goodman Collection of Music; in accepting it he observed that the music used in Shakespeare's theatre had been lost and that no one knew precisely how it had sounded. Not every opportunity succeeded: in 1945, while Jackson was on a goodwill tour of South American libraries for the State Department, negotiations to acquire the remainder of Sir Thomas Phillipps's manuscripts, some 12,000 items, reached a crisis and Harvard lost the opportunity to buy the lot.

=== Teaching ===
Jackson's graduate bibliography course, its format and syllabus entirely of his own devising, met once a week through both terms and was limited to ten or twelve students, mainly graduates of the English department. Students were expected to master McKerrow's Introduction to Bibliography; each session turned on a particular topic such as signatures, cancels, collation, provenance, or type identification, illustrated with books drawn from the Harvard collections and passed around the table. Members also composed and printed a short text as a class, producing a series of pamphlets. In his last year Jackson planned a new course on the history of the book for the General Education programme; it was launched in the autumn of 1964, but he did not live to see it completed.

In 1946 Jackson hired William H. Bond as his assistant; Bond became curator of manuscripts in 1948 and succeeded Jackson as librarian of Houghton in 1965.

== Revision of the Short-Title Catalogue ==
Pollard and Redgrave's Short-Title Catalogue, first published in 1926 and generally known as the STC, became the standard reference system for early English printing, with individual editions commonly identified by their STC numbers. Jackson bought and interleaved a copy in the year of its publication, and the revision, which Bond describes as his great work, effectively began at that point and occupied more of his time and thought as the years went by.

His collaborator was F. S. Ferguson, who had seen and collated most of the early English books passing through the London market over many years and had collected and indexed printers' marks, compartments, and initials; after retiring from the firm of Quaritch, Ferguson worked from a desk reserved for him in the British Museum stacks and made weekly trips to the Bodleian to check points. Jackson for his part visited collection after collection on both sides of the Atlantic, and took responsibility for consolidating and organising the resulting mass of information, the manuscript taking shape in his office.

The change of method was fundamental. Where the original STC had rested largely on printed catalogues and secondary sources, the revision was based so far as possible on personal examination of the books themselves: "ghosts" (entries for books that do not exist) were removed, duplications eliminated, anonymous printers identified, and titles, editions, and issues discovered and differentiated. Bond estimated that the new edition would add some 10,000 entries to the 26,000 of the original, of which between two and three thousand would be new titles.

At Jackson's death the revision had reached the letter R, and his notes for the remainder were full and usable. The work was carried on by Katharine F. Pantzer, the last of his research assistants on the project, with Ferguson's cooperation; L. W. Hanson of the Bodleian took the lead in the Council of the Bibliographical Society in securing its continuation. Bond expected the completed text by 1970, but the revision took much longer: volume 2, covering I–Z, appeared in 1976, and the set was not finished until 1991. The published second edition is formally described as having been begun by Jackson and Ferguson and completed by Pantzer.

== Writings and archives ==
Jackson kept extensive notes on bibliographical points and published articles based on them in journals and Festschriften; sixteen of his contributions appeared in the Harvard Library Bulletin during its first fourteen-year span. He also published nine articles in The Library, journal of The Bibliographical Society. His major separate work apart from the catalogues was Records of the Court of the Stationers' Company 1602 to 1640, an edition with extensive notes of the previously unpublished Court Book C, issued by the Bibliographical Society in 1957. He also compiled An Annotated List of the Publications of the Reverend Thomas Frognall Dibdin, D.D. A posthumous collection of his essays, Records of a Bibliographer: Selected Papers of William Alexander Jackson, was edited by William H. Bond and published in 1967. His personal bibliographical reference collection was described by James E. Walsh in The Book Collector in 1965–66.

Jackson's professional correspondence has been studied as evidence for the practice of bibliography in the twentieth-century United States; Roger E. Stoddard, one of his former assistants, devoted his 2000 presidential address to the Bibliographical Society of America to Jackson's exchanges with the bibliographer Lawrence C. Wroth.

The Houghton Library holds the records of the STC revision project, which document both Jackson's work and Pantzer's continuation of it, including correspondence, research notes, field reports, annotated STC volumes, proof sheets, working papers, index slips, and microfilm of STC items. A separate collection of his papers concerning his publications includes galley and page proofs of the Pforzheimer catalogue and material relating to his work on Dibdin.

== Societies and honours ==
Jackson joined The Bibliographical Society in 1932 and became its honorary secretary for America in 1936. In 1946 he was nominated for the presidency of the Bibliographical Society of America, of which he was not then a member; he joined, was elected, and served for two years. He was a Fellow of the Society of Antiquaries of London and a member of the Massachusetts Historical Society, the American Antiquarian Society, and the American Academy of Arts and Sciences. The Stationers' Company of London awarded him its medal in 1958, and The Bibliographical Society awarded him its Gold Medal posthumously.

Jackson was elected to the Roxburghe Club in 1964, in the same year as his Oxford degree; the single meeting of the club he was able to attend, held at Cambridge with Lord Rothschild as host, was a highlight of his last visit to England in the summer of that year. He was also a member of the Grolier Club and the Century Association in New York, the Club of Odd Volumes — of which he was president at his death — and the Tavern Club in Boston, the Athenaeum in London, and the senior common room of Lincoln College, Oxford; at his death he was secretary of the Walpole Society.

He received honorary degrees from Williams College (AM, 1938), Harvard (LHD, 1962), and the University of Oxford (LittD, 1964). He had also received an honorary master's degree from Harvard in 1943.

== Personal life and death ==
Jackson married Dorothy Judd, of Honolulu, in August 1929. Their only child, Jared Judd Jackson, was born in the summer of 1930 and became a clergyman and a member of the faculty at Williams College. Each summer for twenty-four years Jackson cruised off the coast of Maine with friends, and he retained a strong interest in food and wine dating from a note-taking tour of the wine countries made during his student trip to Europe.

Jackson died of a heart ailment at the Massachusetts General Hospital on October 18, 1964, at the age of 59, while still librarian of the Houghton Library. A memorial service was held at Christ Church, Cambridge.

== Selected works ==
- Unger, Emma V.; Jackson, William A. (1940). The Carl H. Pforzheimer Library: English Literature, 1475–1700. Vol. 3 vols. New York: Carl H. Pforzheimer Library.
- Jackson, William A., ed. (1957). Records of the Court of the Stationers' Company 1602 to 1640. London: The Bibliographical Society.
- Jackson, William A. (1960). "Contemporary Collectors XXIV: Philip Hofer". The Book Collector. 9: 151–164, 292–300.
- Jackson, William A. An Annotated List of the Publications of the Reverend Thomas Frognall Dibdin, D.D.
- Pollard, A. W.; Redgrave, G. R. (1976–1991). A Short-Title Catalogue of Books Printed in England, Scotland, & Ireland and of English Books Printed Abroad, 1475–1640. Begun by W. A. Jackson and F. S. Ferguson; completed by Katharine F. Pantzer (2nd, revised and enlarged ed.). London: The Bibliographical Society.
- Jackson, William A. (1967). Bond, William H. (ed.). Records of a Bibliographer: Selected Papers of William Alexander Jackson. Cambridge, Massachusetts: Harvard University Press.
