= Short-Title Catalogue (Pollard and Redgrave) =

Bibliographical union catalogue of early English printing to 1640

Title page of the second edition, volume 1

A Short-Title Catalogue of Books Printed in England, Scotland, & Ireland and of English Books Printed Abroad, 1475–1640, usually known simply as The Short-Title Catalogue or STC, and also as Pollard and Redgrave, is a bibliographical union catalogue of early printed books compiled originally by Alfred W. Pollard and Gilbert Richard Redgrave and published by The Bibliographical Society. The first edition bears the date 1926, although it was issued in January 1927. It was extensively revised in the second half of the twentieth century by William A. Jackson, Frederic Sutherland Ferguson, and, above all, Katharine F. Pantzer. The revised and enlarged second edition appeared in three volumes between 1976 and 1991.

The STC attempts to identify surviving editions and impressions, and in some cases issues, states and variants, of books and other typographically printed material produced in the British Isles and their colonies through 1640, together with books in English or another language of the British Isles printed abroad. Its first edition contained 26,143 numbered entries and recorded copies in the British Museum, the Bodleian Library, Cambridge University Library, the Henry E. Huntington Library, and nearly 150 further institutional and private collections. The second edition greatly enlarged both the number of entries and the bibliographical information associated with them.

The numbers assigned to its entries (normally cited in forms such as "STC 15375") became standard identifiers for early English printed books. They continue to be used in rare-book catalogues, scholarly editions, English Short Title Catalogue (ESTC) records and the collections underlying Early English Books Online (EEBO). The STC was continued chronologically by Donald Wing's catalogue of books for 1641–1700 and was eventually incorporated, corrected, and extended within the ESTC.

== Background ==
=== Bullen's British Museum catalogue ===
The immediate predecessor of Pollard and Redgrave's STC was the three-volume Catalogue of Books in the Library of the British Museum Printed in England, Scotland, and Ireland, and of Books in English Printed Abroad, to the Year 1640, compiled by George Bullen with the assistance of G. W. Eccles and published by the trustees of the British Museum in 1884. Bullen, then keeper of the Department of Printed Books, established features later associated with the STC: an alphabetical arrangement principally by author, special treatment of anonymous and pseudonymous works, and entries for such corporate or conventional headings as Bibles and liturgies.

Its principal limitation was institutional. Bullen recorded the holdings of a single library rather than attempting a union catalogue of surviving copies throughout Britain and abroad, and it is in this respect above all that the printed short-title catalogues which followed departed from his model. During the following decades bibliographers repeatedly discussed the possibility of building upon Bullen's catalogue to produce a short-title handlist of all extant early English books that could be located.

The project also benefited from late nineteenth- and early twentieth-century bibliographical scholarship, notably Edward Arber's transcription of the registers of the Stationers' Company, as well as work on early printers, booksellers, and individual authors. The dependence of the STC upon Arber's Transcript of the Registers of the Company of Stationers of London, 1554–1640 helped to shape both its bibliographical information and its terminal date.

=== The Bibliographical Society project ===
The proposal was revived at a meeting of the Bibliographical Society on 21 January 1918. Pollard, then secretary of the society, presented facts and figures showing that the bibliographical work published since Bullen's catalogue had made a comprehensive union handlist practicable. The vice-president in the chair was persuaded, and offered both to collaborate in the editing and to provide the funds needed to secure a minimum of paid assistance. This was Redgrave, who had served as president of the society from 1907.

The undertaking developed into a cooperative survey of major collections in Britain and the United States. The title page ultimately named Pollard and Redgrave as compilers "with the help of G. F. Barwick, Geo. Watson Cole, Ethel Fegan ... and others". George Watson Cole, associated with the Huntington Library, was among a much larger group of librarians, collectors, and bibliographers whose reports permitted the catalogue to extend beyond the holdings of the British Museum.

Pollard and Redgrave described their goal as a "short-title" handlist rather than a full descriptive bibliography. The essential object was identification and location: to distinguish one printing from another sufficiently well for a researcher to know what existed and where a copy might be consulted. Pollard's preface expressly described the work as a catalogue of books of which copies had been located, rather than a bibliography of books known or believed to have been produced, and warned users that its mixed sources made it a hazardous work to use without verification.

== First edition ==
=== Publication ===
The completed first edition comprised xviii preliminary pages and 609 pages of catalogue entries. Its title page was dated 1926, the date by which it is conventionally cited, but the volume was actually published in January 1927. It was issued by the Bibliographical Society, with copies also distributed through the antiquarian bookselling firm Bernard Quaritch.

The first edition contained 26,143 numbered entries. It brought together holdings from four especially important collections (the British Museum, the Bodleian Library, Cambridge University Library, and the Henry E. Huntington Library in California) and information from 149 further institutional and private collections. In this respect it transformed the model represented by Bullen's single-library catalogue into a large-scale union catalogue.

The STC rapidly became a standard tool for scholarship on late medieval and early modern Britain. Frank C. Francis, introducing the 1946 reprint, described it as one of the most significant books ever published for the study of English literature to 1640. The numerical identifiers proved particularly influential because they allowed scholars, librarians, booksellers, and collectors to refer unambiguously to a particular bibliographical entry without repeating a long title or description. The convention survived successive revisions of the work.

Pollard reviewed the unfinished business created by publication in "Future Work on the Short-Title Catalogue of English Books, 1475–1640", published in The Library in 1928. The article recognised a characteristic that would remain fundamental to the STC's history: a catalogue of surviving early books could never be final, because unidentified copies, new editions, and revised attributions would continue to emerge.

=== Scope ===
Despite the convenient phrase "English books", the scope of the STC was defined by a combination of place, language, date, and method of production. As summarised by Prof. Ian Gadd, a work qualified if it was printed before 1641; if at least part of it was printed from type rather than by another process such as engraving; and if it was printed either in the British Isles or their colonies or, if printed elsewhere, in English or another British language. Certain special categories, including liturgical printing intended for English or Scottish use, also fell within its scope.

This produced significant exclusions. Large quantities of Continental books in Latin or other foreign languages that were imported, owned, and read in Britain do not appear merely because they circulated there; Gadd notes in particular the absence of the very large numbers of foreign-printed Latin books brought into England from the fifteenth century onwards. The contents of the STC therefore cannot be read as a full representation of Britain's print culture before 1641. Nor does absence from the STC establish that a book never existed. Editions can disappear without surviving copies, while works unknown to the editors have continued to be discovered.

The catalogue was concerned primarily with editions and impressions rather than individual copies as bibliographical objects, although issues, states and variants could sometimes receive separate treatment where they were significant or distinguishable. Entries generally supplied an author or main heading, an abbreviated title, bibliographical format, imprint information, date, references where relevant to the Stationers' Register, and symbols indicating libraries in which copies had been located. Space was limited: an entry listed up to ten holding repositories in Britain and up to ten in North America. Notes could include readings such as catchwords, line endings and spelling variations that allowed users to distinguish closely related printings, together with observations on type and, in some cases, collation formulae.

=== Why 1475 and 1640? ===
The chronological limits in the title became conventional even after scholarship altered their literal accuracy. The beginning date reflected the dating traditionally assigned to William Caxton's translation of Raoul Lefèvre's Recuyell of the Historyes of Troye, the first book printed in English. Subsequent scholarship normally dates its printing to about 1473–1474, and the revised STC is in practice normally described as covering material from 1473 while retaining "1475" in its historic title.

The terminal date, 1640, was more consequential. It coincided with the end of the period covered by Arber's transcription of the Stationers' Register, and preceded the great expansion and destabilisation of the press associated with the political crises of the 1640s and the English Civil War. Before that period the government had exercised reasonably effective control over the output of the press, with the incidental effect of limiting the number of items printed. The breakdown of that system accompanied an enormous increase in printed pamphlets, newsbooks, and other material. More than 14,000 monographs were produced during the 1640s alone, compared with roughly 35,000 monographic and serial entries in the whole of the STC. The scale of post-1640 printing therefore required a separate bibliographical undertaking.

== Reprints and supplementary finding aids ==
Demand for the STC soon exceeded the availability of the original printing. In 1946 the Bibliographical Society produced a photographic or lithographic reprint, in order to forestall an unauthorised American reprint. Further British reprints followed in 1948 and 1950. A photographic reprint was made for the Bibliographical Society by Gregg Press in 1963, and another by Scolar Press in 1969.

Because the STC's compact arrangement did not provide every form of access researchers wanted, a number of complementary indexes and location lists appeared. Paul G. Morrison's Index of Printers, Publishers and Booksellers in A. W. Pollard and G. R. Redgrave A Short-title Catalogue was published by the Bibliographical Society of the University of Virginia in 1950. William Warner Bishop's second edition of A Checklist of American Copies of "Short-Title Catalogue" Books, also published in 1950, augmented information on holdings in the United States.

David Ramage's 1958 A Finding-list of English Books to 1640 in Libraries in the British Isles similarly used STC numbers to identify copies outside the national libraries and the major Oxford and Cambridge collections. A. F. Allison and V. F. Goldsmith later supplied title access with Titles of English Books (and of Foreign Books Printed in England), whose first volume, covering 1475–1640, appeared in 1976.

Rather than construct independent systems of reference, these supplementary catalogues keyed their contents to Pollard and Redgrave's numbers.

== The second edition ==
=== Origins of the revision ===
Almost immediately after publication, copies of the STC accumulated manuscript corrections and additions. A comprehensive revision eventually developed from the interleaved annotations of William A. Jackson, first librarian of Houghton Library at Harvard University, and from his collaboration with Frederic Sutherland Ferguson, an English bibliographer who was for many years managing director of Bernard Quaritch Ltd. Ferguson had already been among the bibliographers who assisted with the first STC.

As discussions progressed, Frank C. Francis of the British Museum made Pollard's own annotated copy available to the revisers. The resulting enterprise was not merely a matter of inserting newly reported books. Individual entries had to be reconsidered in light of physical examination, newly available copies, improved knowledge of printers and type ornaments, revised attribution and dating, and distinctions among editions, issues and states. Pantzer would later characterise the revision as a process of aggregation, confirmation, and reconsideration lasting more than forty years.

Jackson reported on the developing work in "The Revised STC: A Progress Report" in 1955.

=== Pantzer's role ===
Katharine F. Pantzer had attended Jackson's classes in bibliography while a doctoral student at Harvard; he recognised her abilities, and in 1962 she was drawn into the revision, which had by then moved to Harvard because the university could commit space and time to it. When Jackson died in 1964, most of the second half of the alphabet, I to Z, existed in reasonably advanced typescript, while the first half, including the difficult heading "Bible", was less developed. Pantzer inherited the task, assisted by Janet E. Critics and Suellen Mutchow.

Pantzer's task grew into several decades of bibliographical investigation. She described the difficulties of the work in "The Serpentine Progress of the STC Revision", published in the Papers of the Bibliographical Society of America in 1968. Identification frequently depended not simply upon title pages but upon detailed evidence such as types, initials, ornaments, paper, signatures, press variants and the known careers of printers and booksellers.

The scale of the surviving revision archive reflects this method. The Houghton Library collection, at call number 2005M-61, occupies 138 linear feet in 131 boxes and contains correspondence, research notes, field reports, annotated STC volumes, administrative files, proof sheets, working papers, index slips, Pantzer's books, microfilm and microfilm prints of STC items, reference books and offprints, and miscellaneous realia accumulated by the project.

Pantzer's work on the STC became one of the major achievements of twentieth-century bibliography; McKitterick wrote that without her the making, publishing, and selling of British books to 1640 would be far less well understood, and that no other country can boast so full a bibliographical record. The Bibliographical Society awarded her its Gold Medal in 1988, and she was elected an honorary member of the Bibliographical Society of America in 1998.

=== Publication of the three volumes ===
The second edition was formally described as "revised and enlarged, begun by W. A. Jackson & F. S. Ferguson, completed by Katharine F. Pantzer". Its publication sequence was unusual because the latter half of the alphabet appeared first:

Volume	Contents	Bibliographical date	Notes
I	A–H	1986	620 pages. Pantzer's acknowledgements to the volume are dated April 1985.
II	I–Z	1976	504 pages; the first portion of the revision to be published. A contemporary review gives the extent as 494 pages.
III	Indexes, appendices, cumulative addenda and corrigenda	1991	430 pages; included the printers' and publishers' index and a chronological index by Philip R. Rider.

Volume II, covering I–Z, appeared first, in 1976; volume I followed in 1986, and the third volume in 1991, completing the printed revision. No further revisions to the printed STC have been undertaken.

The completed second edition occupied far more space than its predecessor. Excluding the third-volume indexes, the original 609 double-column pages had become 1,114 pages including addenda and corrigenda, while the list of collections consulted expanded from approximately one page to five. The STC as a whole comprises roughly 35,000 monographic and serial entries, though Peter W. M. Blayney has cautioned against treating such totals as straightforward publication statistics.

== Changes in bibliographical method ==
The second edition preserved the fundamental purposes of Pollard and Redgrave while greatly increasing the amount and precision of information. Titles were transcribed more fully; printing and publication information was revised; distinctions among editions, impressions, issues, and variants were reconsidered; and substantially more cross-referencing and explanatory annotation was supplied.

A major constraint upon revision was the success of the original numbering scheme. By the mid-twentieth century STC numbers had become embedded in library catalogues, scholarly books, booksellers' catalogues and microfilm collections, and wholesale renumbering would have destroyed much of their usefulness. The revisers therefore retained original numbers wherever practicable and interpolated newly recognised items by means of decimal or "point" numbers, producing references such as "STC 18425.5". Some old numbers nevertheless had to be reassigned or cross-referenced as bibliographical identifications changed.

Volume III substantially increased the catalogue's usefulness for historical analysis. Besides cumulative additions and corrections, it provided access by printers and publishers, places of publication and date. Such indexes permitted the STC to serve not only as a finding aid for a known author or title, but also as evidence for research into the organisation and chronology of the early English book trade.

The second edition is consequently distinguished in scholarly citation as STC², STC2 or RSTC ("revised STC"), the last form being usual in discussions of the catalogue's relationship to the ESTC.

== Limitations and criticism ==
Neither edition claimed to be a census of everything actually printed. Its evidence is conditioned by survival and discovery: a work printed in hundreds of copies but now entirely lost cannot normally appear as a located STC book, while conversely a single surviving copy may preserve an otherwise unknown edition.

Its linguistic and geographical rules also mean that it is not equivalent to "all books available in Britain before 1641". Continental Latin, French, Italian, and other books imported into Britain in large numbers lie outside its basic remit unless another feature brings them within scope. Statistical conclusions about the total volume of publishing, language, subject or readership based only upon STC entries therefore require caution.

The revised STC also remained a printed, closed bibliography into which new discoveries could not simply be inserted. When the revision was published it was understood that further titles, authors, editions, and corrections would continue to turn up, and it was assumed that some programme would exist for publishing this supplementary information; in practice no such programme proved possible.

Blayney examined the revised catalogue in detail in his 1994 essay "The Numbers Game: Appraising the Revised STC". Proceeding from the observation that a matchless work is not thereby a flawless one, he drew attention to errors, inconsistent classifications, and the hazards of treating its entry counts as uncomplicated publishing statistics, while concluding that the revised STC was nonetheless an indispensable fact of scholarly life.

== Influence ==
=== Wing's continuation ===
The most direct continuation was Donald Wing's Short-Title Catalogue of Books Printed in England, Scotland, Ireland, Wales, and British America and of English Books Printed in Other Countries, 1641–1700. Wing, a librarian at Yale University, was resettling Yale's collections of early English books into the new Sterling Memorial Library and integrating Falconer Madan's collection of seventeenth-century Oxford printing acquired in 1933; having no bibliographical tool for the post-1640 period equivalent to Pollard and Redgrave, he set about making one.

The first edition of Wing appeared in three volumes between 1945 and 1951. It retained the short-title principle but confronted a far greater mass of printed material because of the rapid expansion of the press after 1640, and its entries are correspondingly less detailed than the STC's; unlike the STC, Wing excludes periodicals and other ephemeral material. "STC" and "Wing" consequently became complementary standard references for English-language book history before 1701. Both were later incorporated into the ESTC.

=== Early English Books microfilm ===
An equally important consequence of the STC was its use as the organising bibliography for a large-scale reproduction project. In 1938 Eugene B. Power, founder of University Microfilms, began photographing early printed books on microfilm, initiating the imaging project that would eventually become EEBO. Works listed in the STC were attractive because demand for them was assured: American libraries, relatively recently established, were generally lacking in STC titles.

Production increased sharply at the outbreak of the Second World War, when the conflict threatened European library collections; with Rockefeller funding for the preservation aspect of the work, Power travelled to libraries in the United Kingdom. The undertaking eventually became one of the largest scholarly microform publishing enterprises of the twentieth century.

The project created a lasting connection between the abstract bibliographical entry and a photographic surrogate of a particular copy. UMI's microfilms were initially to contain one book per reel, which would have produced a reel sequence following the STC's numbering; since each reel proved able to hold twenty to thirty books, a more complex system indicating a book's position within a reel had to be devised. Traces of this survive in EEBO's search interface, which still permits searching by reel position.

=== Early English Books Online ===
During the 1990s the earlier microfilms began to be digitised, with groups of images made available electronically from 1998 in the resource eventually known as Early English Books Online (EEBO). Thus a bibliography devised in 1918 indirectly defined a substantial portion of one of the principal digital corpora for the study of early modern literature and history.

EEBO metadata was subsequently linked to and updated from ESTC records, but STC numbers remained searchable identifiers. The Text Creation Partnership, which created machine-readable transcriptions of tens of thousands of EEBO books, likewise incorporated STC identifiers into its file-naming and metadata conventions: transcription files were named from the Pollard and Redgrave or Wing number, prefixed "S" or "W", so that STC 10020.5 became the file S10020-5.sgm.

=== The English Short Title Catalogue ===
A computerised Eighteenth-Century Short Title Catalogue was begun in the late 1970s for the period 1701–1800. In 1987 the ESTC's international committee examined the prospects for a catalogue covering the whole hand-press era and determined not only that this was attainable but that many of its components already existed; the database was accordingly extended backwards to incorporate material from the revised STC and revised Wing. The abbreviation was retained, with "English" replacing "Eighteenth-Century" in the project's name.

The transition addressed one of the basic weaknesses of a printed bibliography: an electronic union catalogue could accumulate additional holdings, new discoveries, and corrections without waiting for another complete printed edition. After completion of STC volume III in 1991, libraries continued to send reports of new locations and corrections, but contributing institutions were never told that the project had finished, and the fate of reports sent after 1991 became unclear. At its meeting of 2 June 1998 the Bibliographical Society, which holds the STC copyright, proposed offering the ESTC responsibility for maintaining the catalogue, and in November 1998 put to the ESTC International Committee that it assume responsibility for new addenda and corrigenda on a three-year trial basis.

McKitterick later examined the complications of incorporating supposedly "not in STC" items into the ESTC, showing in a survey of some 300 such entries that discrepancies could represent genuinely new discoveries, revised bibliographical interpretation or differences between the two systems.

The modern ESTC is therefore both a successor to and an extension of Pollard and Redgrave. It aims to record every distinct letterpress item produced in the English-speaking world before 1801, and functions also as a union catalogue of surviving copies held worldwide. The database went offline in October 2023 together with the rest of the British Library's digital infrastructure following a ransomware attack. In May 2025 a beta version was relaunched on the servers of the Consortium of European Research Libraries, containing about 500,000 records and more than three million holdings, and co-managed by the British Library and ESTC North America. STC numbers continue to be preserved as reference identifiers within most ESTC records with the 'S' prefix.

== Inherited scope and the "illusion of comprehensiveness" ==
The genealogy running from Bullen's institutional catalogue of 1884, through Pollard and Redgrave's union handlist, Pantzer's greatly enlarged revision, mass microfilming, and finally networked databases and digital facsimiles has attracted sustained scholarly attention, because the collecting rules of a printed interwar bibliography were inherited, largely unexamined, by every reproduction and digital system built on top of it.

The mechanism is straightforward. Because the microfilming programme selected its material by reference to the STC, and because EEBO digitised those microfilms, material lying outside Pollard and Redgrave's linguistic and geographical rules was correspondingly less likely to enter the reproduced corpus at any later stage. A body of evidence assembled to answer the question "where can I find a copy of this book?" thereby came to define, for many users, what counted as the surviving record of early modern English print.

Gadd has argued that users of EEBO encounter an "illusion of comprehensiveness" that neither the STC nor Wing ever claimed for themselves, and that both catalogues were explicit about serving as reference lists to known copies rather than as complete accounts of production. Mak has made a related case for an "archaeological" awareness of EEBO's development, using the figure of the palimpsest for the layered and partly obscured material histories such resources carry; both argue that recovering this history produces more precise scholarly claims about work conducted in these corpora.

Later work has also made the boundaries of the printed STC more visible in ordinary bibliographical practice. New books and copies have continued to appear, attributions and dates have changed, and electronic union catalogues can record far more copy locations than a printed volume could accommodate. The ESTC has consequently replaced the printed STC for many kinds of searching and for current location information, without rendering the older work obsolete: STC numbers remain standard scholarly references, and the editorial decisions embodied in the catalogue continue to shape library cataloguing and digital collections.

== Terminology ==
In bibliographical literature several forms are encountered:

- STC normally denotes Pollard and Redgrave's catalogue and, according to context, may refer either to the work as a whole or specifically to the first edition.
- STC² or STC2 is used for the revised second edition completed by Pantzer.
- RSTC ("revised STC") is also used for the second edition, particularly in discussions of its relationship to the ESTC.
- An STC number is the numerical identifier attached to an entry. It is distinct from the record identifier assigned by the ESTC.

Because the same initials are also used generically for a short-title catalogue, context is important. In studies of English printing before 1641, an unqualified reference such as "STC 22273" is normally to the Pollard–Redgrave number.

== See also ==
- Short-title catalogue
- English Short Title Catalogue
- Donald Wing
- Incunabula Short Title Catalogue
- Universal Short Title Catalogue
- Bibliographical Society
- Bibliography
- Incunable
- History of books
- Text Creation Partnership
- Stationers' Company
