= Short-title catalogue =

Bibliographical resource

A short-title catalogue (or catalog) is a bibliographical resource that lists printed items in an abbreviated fashion, recording the most important words of their titles. The term is commonly encountered in the context of early modern books, which frequently have lengthy, descriptive titles on their title pages. Many short-title catalogues are union catalogues, listing items in the custody of multiple libraries.

Online short-title catalogues in fact tend to record complete (and therefore longer) title transcriptions.

== Examples ==
- STC: A. W. Pollard and G. R. Redgrave, editors: A Short-Title Catalogue of Books Printed in England, Scotland and Ireland, and of English Books Printed Abroad 1475–1640. Second edition, revised and enlarged, begun by W. A. Jackson and F. S. Ferguson, completed by K. F. Pantzer. London: The Bibliographical Society. Vol. I (A–H). 1926. Pp. 620. Vol. II (I–Z). 1976. Pp. 504. Vol. III (Indexes, addenda, corrigenda). 1991. Pp. 430.
- Wing: Short-Title Catalogue of Books Printed in England, Scotland, Ireland, Wales, and British America, and of English Books Printed in Other Countries, 1641–1700 by Donald Goddard Wing
- ESTC: English Short Title Catalogue, covering 1473–1800 (and incorporating and updating the STC and Wing)
- NSTC: Nineteenth-Century Short Title Catalogue, of English books 1801–1919
- ISTC: Incunabula Short Title Catalogue, of incunabula, i.e. books printed up to 1500
- STCN: Short Title Catalogue Netherlands, covering the Netherlands, 1540–1800
- STCV: Short Title Catalogus Vlaanderen (Short Title Catalogue Flanders), of books printed in Flanders (including Brussels) prior to 1801
- BM STC: Short-title catalogues of the British Museum (now the British Library), covering various countries and centuries
- USTC: Universal Short Title Catalogue, of all books printed in Europe up to 1650
- Bod-inc.: A Catalogue of Books Printed in the Fifteenth Century now in the Bodleian Library

== See also ==
- History of books
