= Frank Francis =

British librarian and bibliographer

Francis in 1968

Sir Frank Chalton Francis KCB (5 October 1901 – 15 September 1988) was an English academic librarian and curator. Almost all his working life was at the British Museum, first as an Assistant Keeper in the Department of Printed Books, and later as Secretary of the museum, Keeper of Printed Books and, from 1959 to 1968, Director and Principal Librarian of the museum.

As director, Francis worked to modernise and expand the museum, and his ideas contributed to the establishment of a separate British Library after his retirement. He was a well-known bibliographer, lecturing in the subject at University College, London, and serving as secretary, and later president, of the Bibliographical Society. He was one of the pioneers of computerised bibliography for libraries.

== Life and career ==
=== Early years and first posts ===
Francis was born in Liverpool, the only child of Frank William Francis, a provision broker, and his wife, Elizabeth née Chalton. He was educated at the Liverpool Institute High School for Boys and Liverpool University, where he took a first class degree in Classics. From 1923 to 1925, he undertook post-graduate studies at Emmanuel College, Cambridge, where he specialised in early Greek philosophy.

After leaving Cambridge, Francis taught for a year at Holyhead County School, and in 1926 he joined the British Museum as an assistant keeper in the department of printed books. He remained with the museum for 42 years. In 1927, he married Katrina McClennon in Liverpool. There were two sons and one daughter of the marriage. At the museum, Francis was put in charge of Swedish books. He paid several visits to Sweden, studied Swedish and Icelandic and became the museum's leading expert in Scandinavian languages. From 1930 he also took a leading role in the revision of the museum's general catalogue, acquiring a reputation as a bibliographer. In 1936 he was appointed editor of the Bibliographical Society's journal, The Library, a post that he held until 1952. In 1938 he was appointed secretary of the society (jointly with R. B. McKerrow until 1940).

In 1946 Francis was appointed secretary of the British Museum. He was not entirely comfortable in a wholly administrative role, and in 1948 he returned with pleasure to his old department as the junior of the two keepers of printed books. Much of his time in that position was devoted to updating and improving the catalogue. He has been described as the most significant figure of the 20th century in the department of printed books. From 1948 to 1959 he also held the post of lecturer in bibliography at University College London. He was invited to reorganise and catalogue some ancient libraries, including those of Lambeth Palace and several English cathedrals.

=== Director of the British Museum ===
In 1959 Francis was appointed director and principal librarian of the museum in succession to the archaeologist T. D. Kendrick. He was the first director appointed from the department of printed books for nearly a century, and in his determination to be fair to the entirety of the museum he was thought by some to favour other departments at the expense of printed books. He continued the work of his predecessors in restoring galleries damaged by German bombing during the Second World War, and he was responsible for opening new ones, including the Duveen gallery, where the Elgin Marbles were housed from in 1962. It was under his directorship that "schoolboys knocked a leg off one of the Elgin Marbles", an embarrassing event kept secret from the general public for many years, due to fears that this would affect the British Museum's continued ownership claim given the long controversy regarding the Marbles' removal from Athens. The museum adopted the practice of importing exhibitions from other museums and galleries. Francis was a staunch opponent of suggestions that entry charges might be introduced for the museum, describing them as "misconceived and mischievous ... One of the great objects of our great museums is to attract people to come frequently, to see one thing and then go out again – not to come once and see the whole museum. To charge would cut at the root of the development."

Francis took radical steps to modernise and rationalise the organisation and responsibilities of the museum and other organisations for which it was nominally responsible. He was largely responsible for the contents of the British Museum Act of 1963, which gave the Natural History Museum complete independence from the British Museum for the first time, authorised the museum to dispose of duplicate items, and allowed it to store and even display items away from the main building at Bloomsbury. This permitted, for example, the transformation of the museum's department of ethnography into the free-standing Museum of Mankind. It was regretted by some at the time that Francis had not been able to take the even bolder step of splitting the library from the rest of the museum, but he later developed plans for a new library building, which after his retirement came to fruition as the British Library.

In 1964, Francis was elected president of the Bibliographical Society, and was succeeded as secretary by Julian Roberts, whom Francis had recruited to the staff of the British Museum and who had frequently deputised for him as the society's secretary. Roberts later wrote a short biography of Francis for the Oxford Dictionary of National Biography. In 1965, together with Douglas W. Bryant, the university librarian of Harvard University, Francis instigated the Anglo-American Conference on the Mechanization of Library Services, held at Brasenose College, Oxford in June and July 1966. This was later described as "the first attempt for the English-speaking library world to come to terms with library computerization, at that time in its infancy." In 1966, the new complete British Museum catalogue was completed. Francis had drastically streamlined the production of its 263 volumes by deciding that instead of preparing a new catalogue manually, the working copy of the catalogue in the Reading Room of the museum would be tidied up and then photographed and reproduced with minimal editorial changes.

== Honours and last years ==
Francis was appointed CB in 1958 and KCB in 1960.

He received honorary appointments from overseas bodies including the Institut de France, Bibliographical Society of America, Kungliga Gustav Adolfs Akademien, American Academy of Arts and Sciences, and the Pierpont Morgan Library, New York. He held honorary fellowships or degrees conferred by the universities of British Columbia, Cambridge, Exeter, Leeds, Liverpool, New Brunswick, Oxford, and Wales.

In 1971 he was awarded American Library Association Honorary Membership.

Francis retired in 1968, and moved to Nether Winchendon near Aylesbury in Buckinghamshire. He died on 15 September 1988 at Chilton House, Chilton, Buckinghamshire, aged 87, and was buried at Nether Winchendon.

== Publications ==
Francis's publications were "Historical Bibliography" in The Year's Work in Librarianship, 1929–38; and Robert Copland: Sixteenth Century Printer and Translator, (1961); and as editor, The Bibliographical Society, 1892–1942: Studies in Retrospect (1945); Facsimile of The Compleat Catalogue 1680 (1956); and Treasures of the British Museum (1971).
