= Frederic Sutherland Ferguson =

- Born: December 26, 1878; Stoke Newington, London, England
- Died: May 4, 1967 (aged 88); Isle of Wight, England
- Occupation: Bibliographer
- Employer(s): Bernard Quaritch Ltd; British Museum
- Known for: Contributions to the STC; bibliographies of early English and Scottish books
- Title: President of the Bibliographical Society (1950–1952)
- Awards: Gold Medal of the Bibliographical Society (1951)

Frederic Sutherland Ferguson (26 December 1878 in Stoke Newington, London – 4 May 1967 in Isle of Wight) was an English bibliographer.

He was educated at the Grocers' Company's School, Hackney Downs, and at King's College London, but did not take a degree. Ferguson joined the firm of Bernard Quaritch in 1897. He contributed to Pollard and Redgrave's A short-title catalogue of books printed in England, Scotland, & Ireland and of English books printed abroad, 1475-1640 (the "STC"), and was joint editor of a later edition of the STC (with William A. Jackson). He also compiled Title-page borders used in England & Scotland 1435-1640 (with R. B. McKerrow), 1932; and A bibliography of the works of Sir George MacKenzie, lord advocate, founder of the Advocates' Library, 1936.

From 1928 to 1943 he was managing director of Bernard Quaritch Ltd. He retired in 1947, to work in the British Museum on a comprehensive catalogue of early English books. He left his cards and slips to the British Museum, and a collection of 220 Scottish books to the Bodleian Library. In 1954 he had presented 241 early Scottish books to the National Library of Scotland, and other portions of his library are held by the John Rylands Library and the University of Illinois.

Ferguson was President of the Bibliographical Society (1950–1952) and received the Society's Gold Medal in 1951.

== See also ==
- Books in the United Kingdom
