= Helmut Friedlaender =

American lawyer

Helmut Nathan Friedlaender (1913 – November 25, 2008) was an American lawyer and financial adviser who collected rare books.

Friedlaender was born in 1913 in Berlin, Germany. In 1933 he fled to Lausanne, Switzerland afraid that Hitler was about to seal Germany's borders. It was at Lausanne that he received a doctorate in administrative law with a thesis on hydroelectric enterprises. After working at a London-based brokerage for some time where he had been an apprentice and learned international arbitrage.

After arriving in the United States on November 12, 1936, Friedlaender made arrangements for an interview at the investment banking firm of Abraham & Company. The 6-foot, 3-inch tall, 120-pound Friedlaender showed up for the interview wearing traditional attire for the London Stock Exchange, consisting of "striped pants, black jacket, gray tie, black bowler hat, dull black shoes and an umbrella that had never been unfurled". Hundreds of people passed through the reception room to gawk at "what was to all of them a very funny sight", but he got the job.

Friedlaender was an announcer for the Voice of America during World War II for its broadcasts to Europe.

He became an adviser to philanthropist William Rosenwald in 1944, helping arrange the financing for the construction of 1407 Broadway and the purchase of the Empire State Building by the Rosenwald Group.

== Book collector ==
Friedlaender took up book collecting in 1970, with a focus on rare books, including medieval illuminated manuscripts and incunabula (books printed before 1501), with his first purchase being a 15th-century manuscript of the Book of hours. Other items of interest were rare editions of works by Goethe, Heinrich Heine, Franz Kafka and Alexander Pushkin, authors who were among his favorites.

In an auction held by Christie's in April 2001, most of the collection Friedlaender had built up over the previous 30 years was put up for sale, totaling 559 lots. Among the items sold were Cicero's De Officiis, printed in 1465 and one of the first classical works ever printed, sold for $666,000. An illuminated manuscript from Bohemia of St. Gregory's Moralia in Job from the 14th century that retained its original doeskin binding, sold for $248,000. The sale, over two days, realized about $9.4 million dollars.

After the auction was held, Friedlaender would repurchase some of the items on the open market. The managing director of the London bookshop Bernard Quaritch said that Friedlaender would look at these items as lost children and say "I’m going to take them back and give them a proper home" before repurchasing them.

In addition to his membership in the Grolier Club, Friedlaender helped fund libraries and book projects, including his efforts to finance a 3,000-page catalog of the incunabula at the University of Oxford's Bodleian Library, for which he was awarded its Bodley Medal in 2005.

== Personal ==
He married Ernestine Fried in 1944. His wife was president of the Women's City Club of New York from 1975 to 1981 and served on numerous mayoral housing committees.

He died at age 95 on November 25, 2008 in Yarmouth, Maine. He was survived by two daughters. and a granddaughter
