= Kentish Dick =

1670s English Broadside ballad

Kentish Dick is an English Broadside ballad that dates back, from estimation by the English Short Title Catalogue, to the 1670s. The full title is: "Kentish Dick; Or, The Lusty Coach-Man of Westminster. With an Account how he Tickled the Young Lasses and Caused their Sad Lamentation." It is most recognized by the tune to which it is set, "Let Mary Live Long." The ballad's opening lines are, "In Westminster Town/ you there may discover/ a wavering lover." Extant copies of the ballad can be found at the University of Glasgow Library, the British Library and the National Library of Scotland.

== Synopsis ==
The ballad recounts the story of Richard—Kentish Dick—who comes from Kent and makes a sport of pursuing lasses. He pursues these young women indiscriminately—regardless of size or hair color—and given this proclivity, he eschews marriage and is constantly on the look out for another lover. His fair share of paramours are pregnant by him, "and five or six lasses,/ Are gotten with child/ From him, as I hear," and he refuses to marry or take responsibility for any one besides himself. He is able to sexually engage with the women, taking their maidenhead, with the false promise that he will wed them. And given his roaming promiscuity, the town seeks to "sever from him/ That unruly limb."

Form
The ballad's form is set with eleven-line stanzas—usually with three sets of interred, rhyming couplets—with the rhyme scheme: A,B,B,A,C,D,D,E,F,F,E. The last two penultimate lines (F,F) repeat exactly the same line, with variant phrasing.

== Historical Basis ==
The Roxburghe Collection of ballads, currently found at the British Library, portray the county of Kent as an unfavorable place, of which Kentish Dick, the character, is representative. The Kentish Dick ballads, in particular, are all bawdy and comical in presentation and theme. Of the ballads available at UC Santa Barbara's English Broadside Ballad Archive, all feature woodcuts that display Kentish Dick and his lasses. Kentish Dick is dressed in a high-collared dressing coat, with shoulder-length hair, and he holds a scourge in his hand.

More is known about the history of the ballad's tune, "Let Mary Live Long," than the Kentish Dick ballads. Important to note, the "Let Mary Live Long" tune gained popularity with its eleven-line stanzas—thus, it seems as if "Kentish Dick" was made to emulate the tune, rather than vice versa. Simpson refers to the tune as "highly ornamented," and notes that "Let Mary Live Long"'s popularity was largely surprising. Though, with its popularity, the tune gave birth to a large numbers of ballads, and was later included in Robert Drury's The Mad Captain—a ballad opera from 1733.
