= The Lamentation of Cloris =

The Lamentation of Cloris or "The Lamentation of Cloris, For the Unkindness of her Shepherd" is a broadside ballad, which dates from, by estimation of the English Short Title Catalogue, 1678-1680. The ballad begins, "MY Shepherd's unkind,/ alas, what shall I do?." Copies of the ballad can be found at the National Library of Scotland, the British Library, the Pepys Library at Magdalene College, and the University of Glasgow Library. Alternatively, online facsimiles of the ballad are available for public consumption. The nucleus of the ballad centers around a cuckolding and the justification for marital infidelity.

== Tune ==
Extant copies of "The Lamentation of Cloris," found at the English Broadside Ballad Archive of University of California, Santa Barbara, are set to the tune of "O Cloris Awake"—which first appeared in the 1670s. Alternative names for the tune are: "Ah! Chloris Awake" or "Cloris Awake," both of which correspond to the same tune. Simpson suggests that the tune shares a great deal of commonality, though not identicality, with another tune, "Over hills and high mountains."

Sheet music for the tune can be found in Simpson.

== Synopsis ==
The ballad is situated in two parts.

The first part begins with Cloris's lamentation of what she interprets as her ill-use by the Shepherd, Strephon. The relationship, though not explicitly stated, is understood as one between husband and wife. One of Cloris's chief complaints is that she is left alone all day while Strephon is off with his flock. She feels her heart is absent when he is.

The second part follows the relationship when Strephon returns home: he is agitated and tired, and thus, "he's so weary/ he cannot be kind." Cloris laments that she is not yet with child by Strephon, and she expresses envy at seeing other mothers with their infants. Thus, she conspires to cuckold him with the justification of the social stigma that may follow if she does not bear Strephon a child. The lamentation ends with this decision figured in a way that Cloris is young and thus deserves a young lover, and Strephon is at fault for not yet impregnating her.

== Notes ==
The Lamentation of Cloris is not to be confused with a different seventeenth-century ballad, "Constant Cloris: or, her Lamentation for Mirtillo." The former addresses adultery while the latter, quite oppositely, professes the outcome of a devoted spouse.
