= Malone Society =

British scholarly society

The Malone Society is a British-based text publication and general scholarly society devoted to the study of 16th- and early 17th-century drama. It publishes editions of plays from manuscript, facsimile editions of printed and manuscript plays of the period, and editions of original documents relating to English theatre and drama before 1642. It also arranges conferences and provides fellowships and research grants.

== History ==
The society was founded in 1906 on the initiative of Alfred W. Pollard, who stated that "every generation will need to make its own critical editions to suit its own critical taste, but that work of permanent utility can be done by placing in the hands of students at large such reproductions of the original textual authorities as may make constant and continuous reference to those originals themselves unnecessary." The chosen name commemorates Edmond Malone (1741–1812), the editor of the first variorum edition of Shakespeare.

The inaugural meeting was held on 30 July 1906 at University College London. It was attended by Frederick S. Boas, E. K. Chambers, T. Gregory Foster, Walter Wilson Greg, Ronald B. McKerrow, and Pollard. They agreed that a need existed for the reliable transmission of early modern play texts for scholars and students. Therefore they resolved, "that a Society, to be called The Malone Society, be formed for the purpose of producing accurate copies of the best editions of early plays."

Membership of the society had always been by formal nomination, and for many years the number was restricted to 250. Following the relaxation of these rules, membership became increasingly international, and local chapters have been established in the United States, Canada, Japan, New Zealand, and Australia. Members are entitled to a copy of an edited volume published every year by the Society.

The Society is a registered charity in the United Kingdom and its administrative base is at the University of London's Institute of English Studies.

== Publications ==
- A complete list of the society's publications

== Sources ==
- Ashley, Kathleen (2014) [first published 1998]. "Edmund Kerchever Chambers (1866–1954)". In Damico, Helen (ed.). Medieval Scholarship: Literature and Philology. Biographical Studies on the Formation of a Discipline. Vol. 2. Routledge. pp. 313–324. ISBN 9781317732013.
- "About the Society". The Malone Society. n.d.
