= Frederick Freez =

Bookbinder and stationer in Tudor York

Frederick Freez (also Frederick Frees; active 1496 to 1515) was a bookbinder, stationer, and bookseller born in Friesland and active in Tudor period York, England. He has sometimes been identified as York's first printer, although no surviving printed works have been attributed to him.

== Life and career ==
Freez was admitted as a freeman of York in 1496–97, with his occupation recorded as bookbinder and stationer. A 1511 legal record identifies him as having been born in Friesland and previously a stationer in London.

In 1500, Freez and his wife Joanna were admitted to York's Corpus Christi Guild. In March 1506, the city corporation granted him a ten-year tenancy of a property on Coney Street, at an annual rent of £3. Freez was involved in a legal dispute with London printer Richard Pynson in 1505. He was still living in York in 1515, when he was recorded as residing in the parish of St Helen on the Walls.

His brother, Gerard Freez, was the earliest stationer in York whose name appears in a colophon.

== Printing activities ==
A legal record from December 1511 describes Freez as a buke-prynter. Bibliographer Edward Gordon Duff considered this evidence that he may have printed books, although no examples of his work are known. Henry R. Plomer instead identified Hugo Goes, potentially related to Antwerp printer Mathias van der Goes, as the earliest York printer whose activities could be established with certainty.

In 2013, bibliographer Peter W. M. Blayney argued that the description of Freez as a printer might have resulted from confusion with his documented occupation as a seller of printed books verses a printer of books. Blayney concludes there is insufficient evidence to establish if Freez operated a printing press in York. Nevertheless, the The Oxford Handbook of the History of the Book in Early Modern England in 2023 identifies Freez as York's first printer.
