= CERL =

CERL may refer to:

- Central Electricity Research Laboratories, a subset of the British post-war electricity authority
- Computer-based Education Research Laboratory, of the University of Illinois Urbana–Champaign
- Consortium of European Research Libraries
- Construction Engineering Research Laboratory, within the Engineer Research and Development Center of the US Army Corps of Engineers
