= Royal Commission on Technical Instruction =

The Royal Commission on Technical Instruction was a British Royal Commission that sat from 1881 until 1884 and was chaired by Sir Bernhard Samuelson.

The Commission's terms of reference were "to inquire into the Instruction of the Industrial Classes of certain Foreign Countries in technical and other subjects, for the purpose of comparison with that of the corresponding classes in this Country". Alongside Samuelson on the Commission there were H. E. Roscoe, Philip Magnus, John Slagg, Swire Smith and William Woodall. Its secretary was Gilbert Redgrave.

The Commission's Report appeared in five volumes. Volume I was made up of general reports on technical education on the Continent and in Britain, with reports on manufacturing and schools. Volume II contained a report by H. M. Jenkins on agricultural education in Britain, France, Germany, Austria, Switzerland, Belgium, Denmark and Holland, with a report on technical education in the United States and on Canadian elementary education by William Mather. Volumes III, IV and V contained Thomas Wardle's report on the silk industry, Professor Sullivan's plan for Irish technical education and the minutes of evidence and appendices.

The Commission recommended a unified system of elementary and secondary education. The Commissioners reported on their visit to a Swiss elementary school that they "were especially struck with the clean and tidy appearance of the boys, and there was difficulty in realising that the school consisted mainly of children of the lower classes of the population". In regards to Germany, they said: "The one point in which Germany is overwhelmingly superior to England is in schools, and in the education of all classes of the people. ... [T]he dense ignorance so common among workmen in England is unknown".

The Commissioners also wrote,

[I]t is our duty to state that, although the display of continental manufacturers at the Paris International Exhibition in 1878 had led us to expect great progress, we were not prepared for so remarkable a development of their natural resources, nor for such perfection in their industrial establishments as we actually found. ... Your commissioners cannot repeat too often that they have been impressed with the general intelligence and technical knowledge of the masters and managers of industrial establishments on the Continent.
