= Howard Nixon =

Howard M. Nixon OBE
- Born: 3 September 1909; Westminster, London, United Kingdom
- Died: 18 February 1983 (aged 73)
- Resting place: East cloister, Westminster Abbey
- Occupation: Librarian
- Employer(s): British Museum; Westminster Abbey
- Spouse: Enid Bromley (1951–his death)
- Awards: Gold Medal (Bibliographical Society, 1978)

Howard Millar Nixon OBE (3 September 1909 – 18 February 1983) was a British librarian and historian of bookbinding. He was a librarian at the British Museum then Librarian of Westminster Abbey from 1974 until his death.

== Life ==
Howard Millar Nixon was born in Westminster on 3 September 1909 to Leigh Hunter Nixon, a minor canon and precentor of Westminster Abbey, and Harrie Nixon. He accordingly was raised in the Abbey precincts. Nixon was educated at Marlborough College before studying at Keble College, Oxford, where he took a degree in history in 1931. After graduating and finding employment hard to come by, he took up his father's suggestion of working in the Abbey's library, a task that Nixon enjoyed sufficiently to study for a diploma at the School of Library Studies at University College London. In 1936 he began work as a temporary assistant cataloguer at the British Museum; he would eventually rise to the positions of Assistant Keeper in 1946, Deputy Keeper in 1959, and head of rare book collections in 1966. His career was interrupted by war service when he was called up as a major in the Royal Artillery during the Second World War. He spent this time visiting anti-aircraft sites across the country, visiting many local libraries in the process. In 1951 Nixon married Enid Bromley with whom he had three sons.

Returning to the British Museum, Nixon was involved in setting up a microfilm unit and also developed an interest in bookbinding history, a subject upon which he published extensively. In his obituary, The Times called him the "doyen of historians of bookbinding in Britain", with a "keen eye" for detail who had given the subject "not merely an academic distinction that it had lacked before but also a basis on which others will build with confidence".

From 1952-1977 Nixon wrote a series of articles for The Book Collector on English bindings that was published as Five Centuries of English Bookbinding in 1978.

On retiring from the British Museum, Nixon became Librarian of Westminster Abbey in 1974, and held the post until his death.

Nixon was appointed Lecturer in Bibliography at the School of Library Studies at University College London in 1959, holding the post until 1976. He was also Sandars Reader in Bibliography at the University of Cambridge from 1967 to 1968.

He was Lyell Lecturer in Bibliography at the University of Oxford from 1978 to 1979 where he lectured on The History of Decorated Bookbinding in England.

Nixon served as president of the Bibliographical Society from 1974 to 1975 and was awarded the society's gold medal in 1978. He was appointed an Officer of the Order of the British Empire (OBE) in 1983 and was elected to an Honorary Fellowship of Keble. Nixon died on 18 February 1983. His remains are buried in the east cloister of Westminster Abbey.

== Bibliography ==
Selected writings of Howard M. Nixon:

- 1953: Twelve Books in Fine Bindings from the Library of J.W. Hely-Hutchinson. Oxford: Printed for presentation to the members of the Roxburghe Club.
- 1956: Broxbourne Library: Styles and Designs of Bookbindings from the Twelfth to the Twentieth Century. London: Published for the Broxbourne Library by Maggs Bros.
- 1957: Royal English Bookbindings in the British Museum. London: Trustees of the British Museum.
- 1958: "The Baltimore Binding Exhibition." The Book Collector 7, pp. 419–26.
- 1960: "Grolier's Binders: Notes on the Paris Exhibition." The Book Collector pp. 45–51, 165–70.
- 1963: The Development of Certain Types of Bookbinding. [London: Private Libraries Association].
- 1971: "Printed Books", in: Francis, Frank, ed. Treasures of the British Museum. London: Thames & Hudson; Chap. 9 (pp. 309–31)
- 1971: Sixteenth-century Gold-tooled Bookbindings in the Pierpont Morgan Library. New York: Pierpont Morgan Library.
- 1974: English Restoration Bookbindings: Samuel Mearne and His Contemporaries. London: Published for the British Library Board by British Museum Publications Ltd. ISBN 0714103624.
- 1978: Five Centuries of English Bookbinding. London: Scolar Press. ISBN 0859674118.
- 1978: Vekene, Emile van der, with Pavlina Hamanova and Howard M. Nixon. Les reliures aux armoiries de Pierre Ernest de Mansfeld. Luxembourg: Editions de l'Impr. Saint-Paul.
- 1982: British Bookbindings Presented by Kenneth H. Oldaker to the Chapter Library of Westminster Abbey. London : Maggs Bros. ISBN 0901953040.
- 1985: The Gardyners Passetaunce. Williams, Franklin B., Jr., ed.; with notes on the two unique editions in Westminster Abbey Library, descriptions of the bindings in which they were preserved, and the other items found in these bindings, by Howard M. Nixon. London: Roxburghe Club.
- 1992: Nixon, Howard M., and Mirjam M. Foot. The History of Decorated Bookbinding in England. Rev. ed. Oxford: Clarendon Press; New York: Oxford University Press. ISBN 0198181825.
