= Donald Wing =

American librarian

- Born: August 18, 1904; Athol, Massachusetts
- Died: October 1972 (aged 68); Woodbridge, Connecticut
- Education: Yale University (BA, PhD); Trinity College, Cambridge; Harvard University (MA)
- Occupations: Librarian, Bibliographer
- Writing career
- Notable work: Short-Title Catalogue...1641-1700, Gallery of Ghosts

Donald Goddard Wing (August 18, 1904 – October 8, 1972) was an Associate Librarian at Yale University from 1939 to 1970, best known for his publication of the bibliographic work A Short-Title Catalogue of Books Printed in England, Scotland, Ireland, Wales, and British America and of the English Books Printed in Other Countries, 1641-1700 (1945–1951), and companion work A Gallery of Ghosts; Books Published Between 1641-1700 Not Found in the Short-Title Catalogue (1967). Wing's Short title catalogue was a continuation of the earlier A Short-Title Catalogue of Books….1475-1640 (1928) compiled by Pollard and Redgrave. His Short-Title Catalogue became so popular that librarians and booksellers viewed it as an “indispensable tool.” Books referenced in Wing's Short-Title Catalogue became known as “Wing-books,” or books in published in the “Wing-period.” In 1999. American Libraries named him one of the 100 most important library leaders of the 20th century.

== Background ==
Donald Goddard Wing was born on August 18, 1904, in Athol, Massachusetts. From a young age Wing possessed a passion for accumulating literature, which he maintained throughout his life; as a child he “collected the Smart Set and other ‘little magazines,’” in college he “added a book a day to his collection,” and once upon returning from overseas he smuggled in a copy of the banned book Ulysses. Upon graduation of college Wing stated that, “all the seniors were asked what they dreamed of doing, and I said I wanted to read second-hand book catalogues.” Wing's passion for collecting and cataloguing printed materials contributed to his desire to complete his most famous work, his Short-Title Catalogue.

In the summer of 1930 Wing married Pennsylvania native, Charlotte Farquhar, at Sharon Farm in Sandy Spring, Maryland. They honeymooned in Europe together, and then returned to the United States to start a family. Charlotte and Donald had two children together, one boy and one girl.

== Education ==
Wing studied at Yale University, where he received a degree in English in 1926. He continued his education after graduation by attending Trinity College, Cambridge for a year, and then enrolling at Harvard, at which he earned a M.A. After receiving his M.A, Wing, persistent in his desire to learn more about literature, returned to Yale to gain his PhD in English in 1932, where he wrote his dissertation on “Origins of the Comedy of Humours.” Wing would remain at Yale for the majority of his career as the “Head of Accessions (1939-45), Associate Librarian (1945-65), and Associate Librarian for Collections of the Libraries (1966-70).”

== The Short-Title Catalogue (STC) ==
Wing is most commonly known for his work on the bibliographic reference tool A Short-Title Catalogue of Books Printed in England, Scotland, Ireland, Wales, and British America and of the English Books Printed in Other Countries, 1641-1700 (STC). 1641-1700 was an exciting time in the world of printing in England, and Wing's STC focused on these books. In 1641 the English Civil War began and with it “brought an abrupt end to government control of the press in England,” hence countless new books and periodicals flooded the English market. Wing's STC followed the Short-Title Catalogue ...1475-1640 arranged by Pollard and Redgrave, which contains books published in 1475-1640 of which copies exist in libraries in the British Isles or North America (listing several locations for each if known). Not only did Wing work independently on his edition of the STC “during his spare time,” but he encompassed an even greater magnitude of information. The STC created by Wing included “about 90,000 titles, about three times as many as the earlier STC [by Pollard and Redgrave].”

Wing began creating his STC in 1933 and referred to it as a project only a “fool would undertake…but [a project that a person] has to be a particularly preserving fool to finish.” When asked why he started his project, Wing asserted that in 1933 the Yale Library attempted to retrieve all the books that were at Yale in 1742, but according to him, “there were still too many unidentified entries.” Also during that year Yale received Falconer Madan’s book collection for the library, but as Wing claimed there was still no “bibliographical tools to aid in their cataloguing.” Even though Wing worked alone on his project, in The Making of the “Short-Title Catalogue” he credits the community and book collectors for helping him find more books to add to his STC. Therefore, due to the graciousness of many private collectors and booksellers, Wing was able to add more books to his STC than ones just found in libraries. In addition, in 1936 Wing received the Guggenheim fellowship to find books for his STC in British libraries, and spent a year abroad.

Following completion of the STC in 1952 Wing worked with the University of Michigan to select books to be microfilmed for their microfilm series Early English printed books, 1641-1700.

The process of compiling his STC was meticulous and brutal. Wing hand copied down thousands of authors, book titles, and publishing dates on to 3 by 5 sheets of paper, which he stored in shoeboxes. These “slips” as he called them, would contain the bibliographic information that was alphabetically entered into his STC. It is no doubt that Wing's tedious work succeeded, as his STC became widely known as an “indispensable tool,” for librarians and researchers. Plus, Wing published a supplement to his STC entitled the Gallery of Ghosts in 1967, in which he included books that were known to have been printed in the time of the STC, but of which copies could not be found in the libraries investigated.

Work continued on the catalogue and the second edition was published in four volumes: Short-title Catalogue of Books printed in England, Scotland, Wales, and British America, and of English books printed in other countries, 1641-1700; compiled by Donald Wing. 2nd ed., newly rev. and enl. / revised and edited by John J. Morrison and Carolyn W. Nelson, editors, and Matthew Seccombe, assistant editor. 4 vols. New York: Modern Language Association of America, 1972, 1982, 1988, 1998. ISBN 0-87352-661-9 (vol. 4 consists of indexes).

Wing's Short Title Catalogue is now part of the English Short Title Catalogue (ESTC), hosted by the British Library as a free Web resource.

== Legacy ==
Donald Goddard Wing died in 1972 in his home in Woodbridge, Connecticut, at the age of 68. Wing's STC is still cited today by numerous authors and researchers, and it still sits upon multiple library shelves. In 1994 the Beinecke Rare Book and Manuscript Library honored Donald Wing's accomplishments by creating an exhibition entitled “A Celebration of Sixty Years at Yale: Donald Wing and his Short-Title Catalogue.” In addition, in 1999 American Libraries honored Wing with the title of one of the 100 most important library figures in the 20th century.

== See also ==
- Books in the United Kingdom
