= English Short Title Catalogue =

Bibliographic database

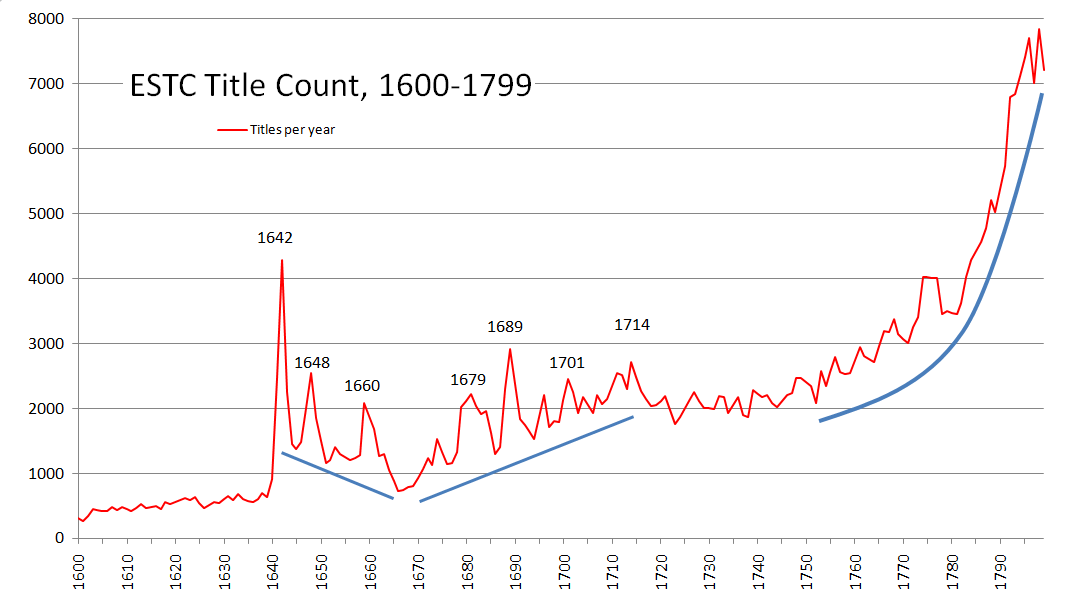
ESTC title count 1600–1799. The ups and downs in phases of political turmoil are clearly visible, particularly the sharp rise of the title output following the abolition of the Star chamber in 1641.

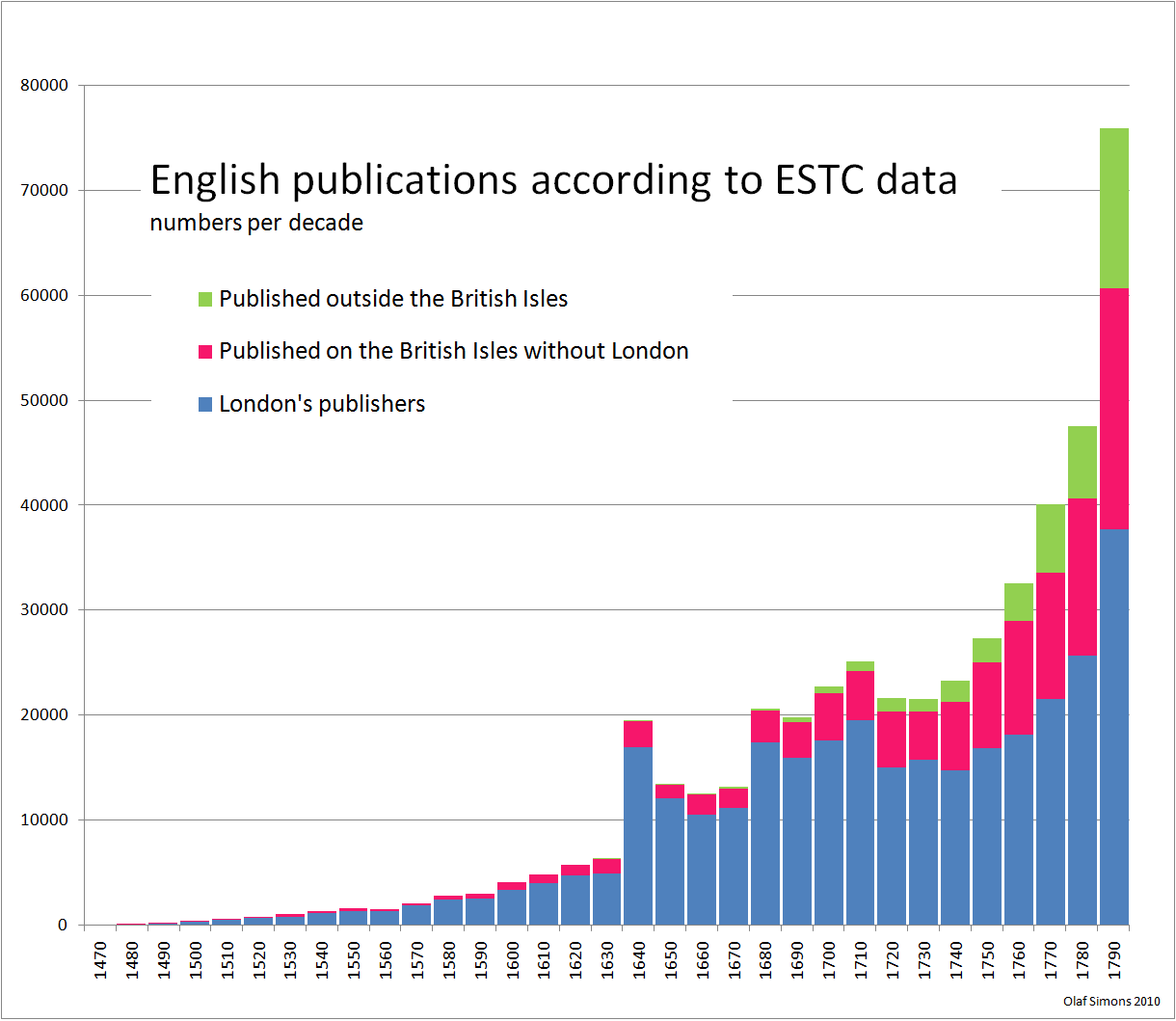
The series 1477–1799 with numbers per decade

The English Short Title Catalogue (ESTC) is a union short-title catalogue of works published between 1473 and 1800, in Britain and its former colonies, notably those in North America, and primarily in English, drawing on the collections of the British Library and other libraries in Britain and around the world. It is co-managed by the British Library and the Center for Bibliographical Studies and Research (CBSR) at the University of California, Riverside. The database is freely searchable.

== History ==
The ESTC began life as the Eighteenth-Century Short Title Catalogue, with the same abbreviation, covering only 1701 to 1800. Earlier printed works had been catalogued in A. W. Pollard and G. R. Redgrave's Short Title Catalogue (1st edn 1926; 2nd edn, 1976–91) for the period 1473 to 1640; and Donald Goddard Wing's similarly titled bibliography (1945–51, with later supplements and addenda) for the period 1641 to 1700. These works were eventually incorporated into the database.

=== Website attack ===
In October 2023, the database went offline, along with the broader digital infrastructure of the British Library, due to a ransomware cyberattack. A temporary version of the pre-1700 ESTC, derived from data captured in 2014, is hosted at Print Probability. As of January 2024, the Print Probability data also includes limited post-1700 ESTC entries.

In May 2025, a complete version of the English Short Title Catalogue was relaunched in beta by the Consortium of European Research Libraries (CERL), in collaboration with the original ESTC teams at the British Library and CBSR. This platform included a new search history function.

== See also ==
- Books in the United Kingdom
- Books in the United States
- Incunabula Short Title Catalogue
- Universal Short Title Catalogue

== Bibliography ==
- Barker, Nicolas. "The Author as Editor."The Book Collector 41 (no 1) Spring, 1992:9-27.
- Snyder, Henry L. and Michael S. Smith (eds.) The English Short-Title Catalogue: past, present, future. New York: AMS, 2003.
