= Katharine F. Pantzer =

American bibliographer

- Born: October 28, 1930; Indianapolis, United States
- Died: October 4, 2005 (aged 74); Columbus, Indiana, United States
- Other name: Kitzi Pantzer
- Occupation: bibliographer
- Notable work: STC, second edition

Katharine Ferriday Pantzer (also known as Kitzi Pantzer) was an American bibliographer, known for her revision of the bibliographical tool known as the STC (A Short-Title Catalogue of Books Printed in England, Scotland and Ireland, and of English Books Printed Abroad 1475–1640).

Pantzer was born in Indianapolis in 1930. She attended Tudor Hall School for Girls, Vassar College, and Harvard University, where she received her Ph.D. In 1964, while at Harvard, she took over the project to revise the 1926 STC, published in two volumes in 1976 and 1986, followed by the 1991 volume of indexes for which she won the Besterman Medal for an outstanding bibliography. In the words of an obituarist, 'her knowledge of the London book trade was, in many respects, verging on encyclopaedic.'

In 1988, she was awarded the Gold Medal of the Bibliographical Society, and a Guggenheim Fellowship in 1991. In 1993, she was elected a Corresponding Fellow of the British Academy. The Bibliographical Society of America made her an Honorary Member in 1998.

Pantzer died in 2005.
