= Books in the United Kingdom =

Books in the United Kingdom have been studied from a variety of cultural, economic, political, and social angles since the formation of the Bibliographical Society in 1892 and since the History of books became an acknowledged academic discipline in the 1980s. Books are understood as "written or printed work consisting of pages glued or sewn together along one side and bound in covers".

== History ==
Scribes produced handwritten manuscript books for many hundreds of years before the printing press was introduced in the British Isles. In 1477 William Caxton in Westminster printed The Dictes or Sayengis of the Philosophres, considered "the first dated book printed in England."

== Publishers ==
As of 2018, seven firms in the United Kingdom rank among the world's biggest publishers of books in terms of revenue: Bloomsbury, Cambridge University Press, Informa, Oxford University Press, Pearson, Quarto, and RELX Group. (Note: Of these, several also topped the list in 2016 and 2017.)

== Bookselling ==
The Antiquarian Booksellers Association formed in 1906, and the Provincial Booksellers Fairs Association in 1972.

== Collections ==
The University of Oxford's Bodleian Library was founded in 1602.

The British Library was formally established in 1973, its collection previously part of the British Museum (est. 1753).

The Legal Deposit Libraries Act 2003 stipulates that the British Library receives a copy of every printed work published in the United Kingdom. Five other libraries are entitled to copies: Cambridge University Library, University of Oxford's Bodleian Library, the National Library of Scotland, the Library of Trinity College, Dublin, and the National Library of Wales. The London-based Copyright Agency became the Edinburgh-based Agency for the Legal Deposit Libraries in 2009.

== Clubs ==
- "Richard & Judy Book Club", broadcast on Channel 4 TV
- "Bookclub", on BBC Radio 4

== Book prizes ==
Several major literary awards are given in Britain to both British and international writers.

- Booker Prize
- Goldsmiths Prize
- Polari Prize
- Women's Prize for Fiction

== Digitisation ==
The British Library began digitising collections in 2007.

US-based Google Inc. began scanning pages of Bodleian Library volumes in 2005, as part of its new Google Books Library Project.

== See also ==
- Copyright law of the United Kingdom
- List of largest book publishers of the United Kingdom
- British National Bibliography
- English Short Title Catalogue
- Eighteenth Century Collections Online
- Nineteenth-Century Short Title Catalogue
- Children's books: United Kingdom and List of UK children's book publishers
- British bibliophiles
- LGBTQ literature in the United Kingdom
- Book censorship in the United Kingdom

== Images ==
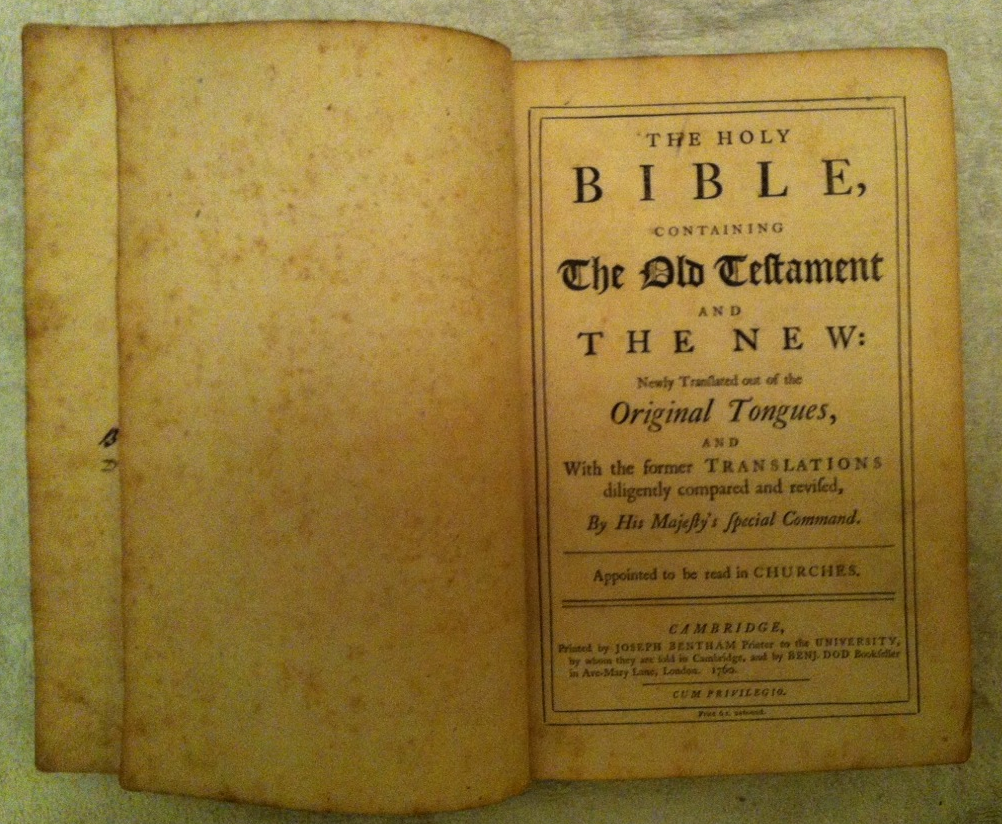
King James Bible, 1760 ed.; first issued in 1611

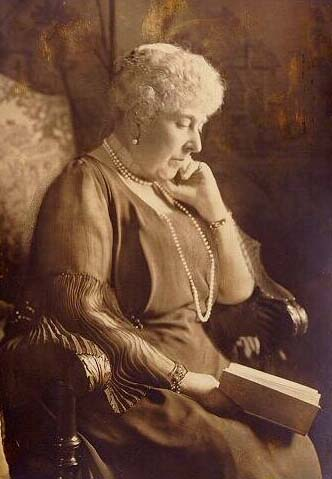
Princess Beatrice with book, circa 1925

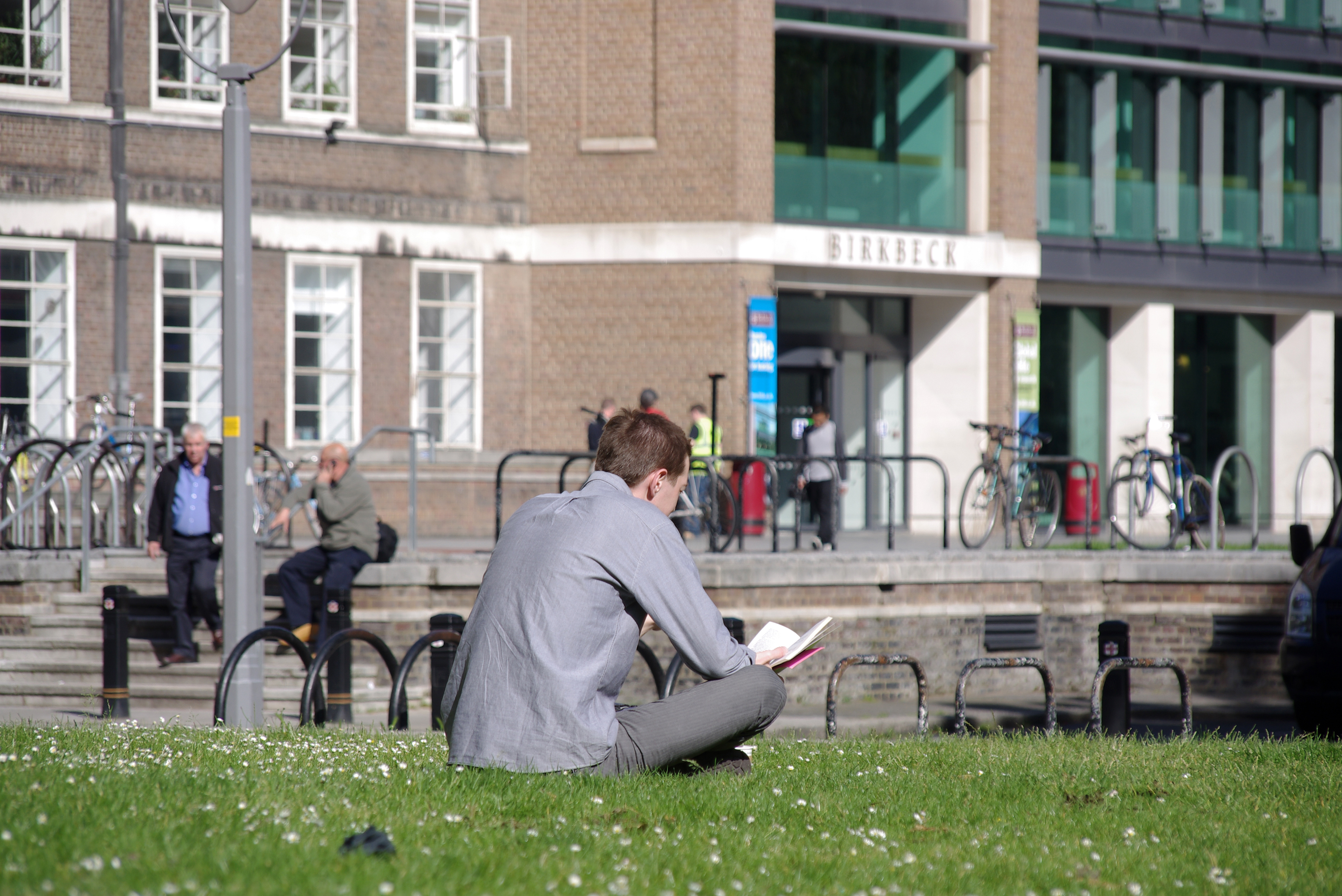
Man reading at Birkbeck College, London, 2012

== Bibliography ==
published in 19th century

- Robert Watt (1824), Bibliotheca Britannica + v.2
- G.W. Porter; G.K. Fortescue, eds. (1889). "Bibliographies of Countries: Great Britain and Ireland". List of Bibliographical Works in the Reading Room of the British Museum (2nd ed.). London. OCLC 3816244 – via Internet Archive.
- Robert Proctor (1898). "Books Printed From Types: England". Index to the Early Printed Books in the British Museum. London: Kegan Paul, Trench, Trübner and Company. pp. 714+. hdl:2027/uc1.c3450632. OCLC 6438080 – via HathiTrust.

published in 20th century

- "Bibliography: National Bibliographies". Chambers's Encyclopaedia. Vol. 2. London. 1901. "Great Britain"
- Alice Bertha Kroeger; Isadore Gilbert Mudge (1917). "Bibliography: National and Trade: English". Guide to the Study and Use of Reference Books (3rd ed.). American Library Association.
- Pollard and Redgrave (1928), Short-Title Catalogue of Books…1475-1640
- Donald Wing (1945–1951), Short-Title Catalogue of Books Printed in England, Scotland, Ireland, Wales and British America and of English Books Printed in Other Countries, 1641-1700
- W. W. Greg (1954), Some Aspects and Problems of London Publishing, 1550–1650
- Philip G. Altbach; Edith S. Hoshino, eds. (1995). "United Kingdom". International Book Publishing: An Encyclopedia. Garland. ISBN 9781134261260.
- Helmut Gneuss, ed. (1996). Books and Libraries in Early England. Variorum. ISBN 0860786021.
- J. Raven, H. Small, and N. Tadmor (eds.), The Practice and Representation of Reading in England (Cambridge UP, 1996)
- History of the Book in Britain. Cambridge University Press. 1998–2014. ISBN 0521573467. (6 volumes)

published in 21st century

- Sally Mapstone; et al., eds. (2007–2012). Edinburgh History of the Book in Scotland. Edinburgh University Press. ISBN 9780748619122.
- Leah Price (2012). How to Do Things with Books in Victorian Britain. Princeton University Press. ISBN 978-0691114170.
- Michael F. Suarez; H. R. Woudhuysen, eds. (2013). The Book: A Global History. Oxford University Press. ISBN 978-0-19-967941-6.. Contains chapters: "Britain, c.1475-1800" by Andrew Murphy; "Britain, 1801-1914" by Leslie Howsam; "Britain from 1914" by Claire Squires
- The Publishers Association (2013). Directory of Publishing 2014: United Kingdom and The Republic of Ireland (38 ed.). Bloomsbury. ISBN 9781472537447. OCLC 762676621.
- Nicola Wilson, ed. (2016). The Book World: Selling and Distributing British Literature, 1900-1940. Brill. ISBN 9789004315860.
- Abigail Williams (2017). Social Life of Books: Reading Together in the Eighteenth-Century Home. Yale University Press. ISBN 978-0300208290.
