= George Watson Cole =

American librarian and bibliographer

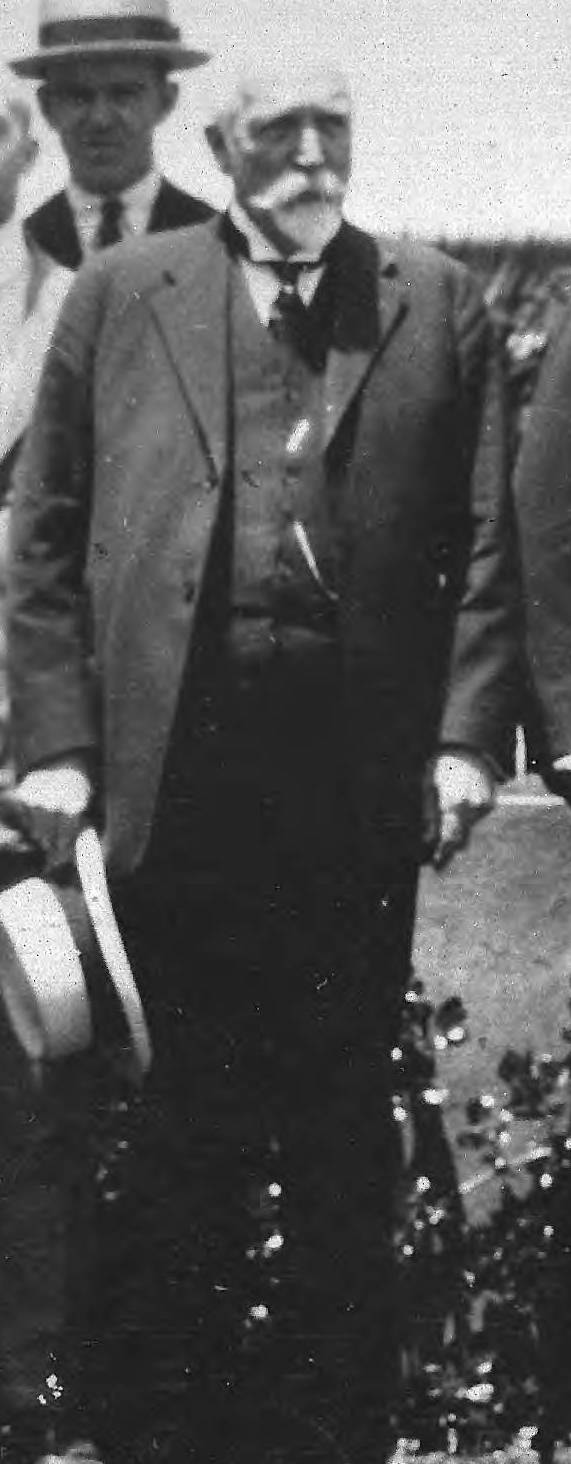
- Born: September 6, 1850; Warren, Connecticut
- Died: October 10, 1939 (aged 89); San Marino, California
- Burial place: Forest Lawn Memorial Park
- Occupation: Librarian
- Known for: Bibliographer and Director of the Huntington Library (1915-1924)

George Watson Cole (September 6, 1850 – October 10, 1939) was an American librarian and bibliographer.

== Biography ==
George Watson Cole was born in Warren, Connecticut on September 6, 1850. He was educated at Phillips Academy, and began practicing law in 1876.

He began working in libraries at the age of 35. Starting in 1885, Cole worked to compile a printed catalogue of the Fitchburg, Massachusetts Public Library. In 1886, he became librarian for the Pratt Institute of Brooklyn, New York. In 1888, Cole entered the first class of Melvil Dewey's library school at Columbia College. He graduated from the program in 1888 and went to work for the Newberry Library in Chicago.

Cole left Chicago in 1891 to work as the librarian of the Free Public Library of Jersey City, New Jersey. He left Jersey City in 1895 to travel and work on bibliographic research. Cole's most celebrated work was a series of annotated catalogs of the private library of E. Dwight Church.

From 1915 to 1924, Cole served as the librarian of the Henry E. Huntington Library and Art Gallery. Cole was president of the Bibliographical Society of America from 1916-1921.

He died at his home in San Marino, California on October 10, 1939, and was buried at Forest Lawn Memorial Park.

In 1999, Cole was named as one of 100 American librarians who made a lasting impact on library service and the nation.

== Publications ==
- "The Henry E. Huntington Library and Art Gallery" (1923)
- "The First folio of Shakespeare; a further word regarding the correct arrangement of its preliminary leaves" (1909)
- "Check list of some of the rarities in the library of E. Dwight Church of New York city" (1903)
- "Libraries of Greater New York : Manual and historical sketch of the New York Library Club" (1902)
- "Classified catalogue of the public library, of Fitchburg, Massachusetts" (1886)
