= A Catalogue of Books Printed in the Fifteenth Century now in the Bodleian Library =

- Author: Alan Coates, Kristian Jensen, Cristina Dondi, Bettina Wagner and Helen Dixon; with the assistance of Carolinne White and Elizabeth Mathew; blockbooks, woodcuts and metalcut single sheets by Nigel F. Palmer; inventory of Hebrew incunabula by Silke Schaeper
- Language: English, Latin, Hebrew and Greek
- Subject: Incunabula, Bodleian Library
- Genre: Short title catalogue
- Publisher: Oxford University Press
- Publication date: 7 July 2005
- Publication place: United Kingdom
- Media type: Print
- Pages: 6 volumes (lxxxvii, 2,165 p.)
- ISBN: 0199513732 (set); 0199519056 (vol. 1); 0199519064 (vol. 2); 0199519072 (vol. 3); 0199519080 (vol. 4); 0199519099 (vol. 5); 0199519102 (vol. 6)
- OCLC: 61755765
- Dewey Decimal: 016.093
- LC Class: Z240.A1 B63 2005

A Catalogue of Books Printed in the Fifteenth Century now in the Bodleian Library (cited as Bod-inc.) is a short-title catalogue of more than 5,600 incunabula held in the Bodleian Library at the University of Oxford. Bod-inc. stands out among incunabula catalogues for its detailed listing of the contents of each edition being described. It was published on 7 July 2005 by Oxford University Press in six volumes.

== History ==
L. A. Sheppard began work on a catalogue of Bodleian incunabula in 1955 but he left Oxford in 1971 before the work could be completed; his slip catalogue was bound into seven volumes and served as a base of information for the Bod-inc. project. In the mid-1980s, Kristian Jensen, as the Bodleian Library's specialist in early printed books, decided that a new catalogue was needed and that its descriptions should follow the standards of detail expected in catalogues of medieval manuscripts. Early in the project, Jensen was assisted by Bettina Wagner and Alan Coates beginning in 1992. Work on Bod-inc. was undertaken over the thirteen-year period between January 1992 and January 2005 by a team of cataloguers. From 1992 to 1999, Jensen headed the cataloguing team; he was succeeded by Alan Coates who headed the project from 2000 to its completion, during which time Jensen served as a consultant. Bod-inc. was published in the 400th anniversary year of the publication of the first catalogue of the Bodleian Library in 1605.

== Aims of the catalogue ==
The aims of Bod-inc. are summarized in the catalogue's introduction:

The main aim of the catalogue has been, from the outset, to combine information about the individual copies in the collections of the Bodleian Library (their bindings, their provenance, manuscript notes, and other signs of use) with a detailed analysis of the contents of each edition, locating all texts in each edition, identifying their authors, and giving references to modern editions of each text where they exist. It is not the aim of the catalogue to replicate typographical information which is already available in one of the other detailed incunable catalogues, such as GW, BMC, or Polain.

== Contents ==
Bod-inc. is divided into six volumes:

=== Volume 1 ===
- Dedication to L. A. Sheppard
- Preface by Reginald Carr
- List of organizations and individuals who sponsored the cataloguing project
- List of members of the cataloguing team
- List of academic advisers
- Acknowledgements
- Bibliographical abbreviations
- General abbreviations
- "The Bodleian Library and Its Incunabula" by Alan Coates
- "Form of the Entries in the Catalogue" by Alan Coates and Kristian Jensen
- Descriptions by Nigel F. Palmer of blockbooks and woodcut and metalcut single sheets
- Descriptions of incunabula arranged alphabetically by author or title, A

=== Volume 2 ===
- Descriptions of incunabula arranged alphabetically by author or title, B–C

=== Volume 3 ===
- Descriptions of incunabula arranged alphabetically by author or title, D–H

=== Volume 4 ===
- Descriptions of incunabula arranged alphabetically by author or title, I–O

=== Volume 5 ===
- Descriptions of incunabula arranged alphabetically by author or title, P–S

=== Volume 6 ===
- Descriptions of incunabula arranged alphabetically by author or title, T–Z
- Inventory by Silke Schaeper of Hebrew incunabula
- Indexes
  - Index of authors, translators, editors, dedicatees
  - Index of provenances, owners, donors, and other names
  - Index of printers and publishers
- Appendices
  - Items recorded by Sheppard, but not included in the Catalogue
  - Items included in ISTC, but excluded from the Catalogue
  - List of items in Schreiber, Woodcuts from Books of the 15th Century

== Reviews ==
- Needham, Paul (September 2007). "The Bodleian Library Incunables". Papers of the Bibliographical Society of America. 101 (3): 345–395.
- Sharpe, Richard (June 2008). "The Present and Future of Incunable Cataloguing, II". The Library. 7th ser. 9 (2): 210–224. doi:10.1093/library/9.2.210.
