= W. W. Greg =

20th-century English bibliographer and Shakespeare scholar

Sir Walter Wilson Greg (9 July 1875 – 4 March 1959), known professionally as W. W. Greg, was one of the leading bibliographers and Shakespeare scholars of the 20th century.

== Family and education ==
Greg was born at Wimbledon Common in 1875. His father, William Rathbone Greg, was an essayist; his mother was the daughter of James Wilson. As a child, Greg was expected one day to assume editorship of The Economist, which his grandfather had founded in 1843; Greg was educated at Wixenford, Harrow and Trinity College, Cambridge.

At Cambridge, he met Ronald McKerrow, whose friendship helped shape Greg's decision to pursue a career in literature. He was an inaugural member of the Malone Society. While still in school he compiled a list of Renaissance plays printed before 1700, and he joined the Bibliographical Society the same year. He was President of the Society from 1930 to 1932, and received its Gold Medal in 1935.

== Career ==
After school, Greg settled into a life of steady productivity, while living on the proceeds of his shares of The Economist. Working in close association with A. H. Bullen, he produced Pastoral Poetry and Pastoral Drama (1906), the first edited version of the account books of Philip Henslowe (1906–8) and the papers of Edward Alleyn. The latter two works provided him with a knowledge of Renaissance theatrical conditions perhaps rivalled only by E. K. Chambers, and this knowledge he applied to the publications of the Malone Society, which he served as general editor between 1906 and 1939. He served as Librarian of Trinity College, 1907–13, resigning after his marriage to his cousin Elizabeth Gaskell.

In 1913 he held the Sandars Readership in Bibliography at Cambridge University lecturing on "Some bibliographical and textual problems of the English Miracle-play Cycles."

As an independent scholar, Greg produced editions of The Merry Wives of Windsor (1910), Robert Greene's Orlando Furioso and George Peele's The Battle of Alcazar (published together, 1923), and Sir Thomas More (1911). He returned to specific editing with work on Doctor Faustus (1950). Greg also wrote on the material conditions of English Renaissance theatre and publishing; his work in this regard includes Dramatic Documents from the Elizabethan Playhouses (1931) and English Literary Autographs, 1550–1650 (1932). The Variants in the First Quarto of King Lear (1940) offered a careful examination of this printing. He also wrote hundreds of reviews, including a notably caustic rejection of J. Churton Collins's 1905 Oxford edition of Robert Greene.

At the beginning of World War II, Greg moved to Sussex, where he spent the war working on his edition of Faustus. In addition, he began to prepare his great works of the 1950s: The Editorial Problem in Shakespeare (1951), The Shakespeare First Folio: Its Bibliographical and Textual History (1955), Some Aspects and Problems of London Publishing, 1550–1650 (1954), and the essay "The rationale of copy-text" (1950), which had a significant influence on textual criticism. Greg was elected to the American Philosophical Society in 1945.

Greg was knighted in the 1950 King's Birthday Honours List. He was Lyell Reader in Bibliography at Oxford University, 1954–5 speaking on "Some Aspects and Problems of London Publishing between 1550 and 1650." Greg was strongly associated with Alfred W. Pollard in developing a modern understanding of the transmission of Shakespeare's texts.

== Selected publications ==
- Greg, W. W. (Walter Wilson). (2010) ed. Shakespeare’s Hand in the Play of Sir Thomas More. Cambridge: Cambridge University Press, 2010.
- Greg, W. W. (1961). The Tragical History of the Life and Death of Doctor Faustus: A Conjectural Reconstruction by W.W. Greg. Oxford: Clarendon Press.
- Greg, W. W., and Stationers’ Company (London, England). 1959. A Bibliography of the English Printed Drama to the Restoration. London: Printed for the Bibliographical Society at the University Press, Oxford.
- Greg, W.W. (1956). Shakespeare Quartos in Collotype Facsimile. Oxford: Clarendon Press.
- Greg, W.W. "The Rationale of Copy-Text". Studies in Bibliography 3 (1950-1951): 19–37.

== Sources ==
- Wilson, F. P. Sir Walter Wilson Greg, 1875-1959. London, British Academy, 1960.
- Greg, W.W. "The Rationale of Copy-Text". Studies in Bibliography 3 (1950-1951): 19–37.

== Works ==
- Heath, H. F.; Greg, Walter Wilson (1901). The Modern Language Quarterly, Volume 4. Contributors Modern Language Association (Great Britain), Modern Language Association (Great Britain). David Nutt.
