= Gilbert Richard Redgrave =

Gilbert Richard Redgrave (12 May 1844 in Kensington, London – 14 June 1941 in Abinger Common, Surrey) was an English architectural draughtsman, bibliographer and art historian.

Redgrave was son of the painter Richard Redgrave and his wife Rose Margaret Bacon (1811–). In the 1860s he worked on the design of the Royal Albert Hall, writing the programme of its opening ceremony. He was manager of the first Alexandra Palace at Muswell Hill, destroyed by fire shortly after its opening in 1873, and architect to the Royal Commissioners of the Paris Exhibition in 1878. He became an Officer of the Légion d'honneur and a member of the Athenaeum Club. Secretary of the 1881–84 Royal Commission on Technical Instruction, Redgrave became an Inspector of Schools, rising to become chief senior inspector of technical schools under the Board of Education in 1897 and assistant secretary to the Board in 1900.

He edited his father's writings and addresses, and published several works of his own on art history. He was president of The Bibliographical Society in 1908, and with Alfred W. Pollard edited the STC, or A short-title catalogue of books printed in England, Scotland, & Ireland and of English books printed abroad, 1475–1640 (1926).
