= Ronald Brunlees McKerrow =

British Shakespeare scholar (1872–1940)

Ronald Brunlees McKerrow FBA
- Portrait by Walter Stoneman, 1933
- Born: 12 December 1872; Putney, Surrey, England
- Died: 20 January 1940 (aged 67); Wendover, Buckinghamshire, England
- Other name: R. B. McKerrow
- Occupations: Bibliographer; scholar

Academic background
- Education: Harrow School
- Alma mater: Trinity College, Cambridge

Academic work
- Discipline: Shakespeare scholar
- Institutions: King's College London
- Notable works

Ronald Brunlees McKerrow FBA (12 December 1872 – 20 January 1940) was one of the leading bibliographers and Shakespeare scholars of the 20th century.

== Life ==
R. B. McKerrow was born in Putney, Surrey, son of Alexander McKerrow, a civil engineer, and Mary Jane Brunlees, daughter of Sir James Brunlees, a president of the Institution of Civil Engineers. His paternal grandfather was William McKerrow, a noted cleric in the Presbyterian Church. R. B. died at Picket Piece in Wendover, Buckinghamshire, where he was buried.

He was educated at Harrow, at King's College, London, and at Trinity College, Cambridge. He then taught English for three years in Tokyo (1897–1900), where he learnt Japanese.

Following his return to London, he became a director of the publishing house Sidgwick and Jackson (1908). He was awarded a D.Litt. by the University of Cambridge in 1911. In 1912 he became joint Honorary Secretary of the Bibliographical Society (with A. W. Pollard). The Society became the focus for much of his intellectual activity.

During the First World War McKerrow taught in the English Department at King's College, London (until 1919). He founded the Review of English Studies in 1925 and remained its editor until his death. He also edited the Bibliographical Society's journal The Library from 1934 to 1937.

McKerrow received an honorary doctorate from Louvain University in 1927. He held the Sandars Reader in Bibliography at Cambridge University in 1928 speaking on "The relationship of English printed books to authors’ manuscripts in the 16th and 17th centuries."

In 1929 he was awarded the Gold Medal of the Bibliographical Society.

In 1932 he became a fellow of the British Academy.

His papers are preserved in the Library of Trinity College, Cambridge.

== Work ==
McKerrow's work had three main focuses:

- the textual study of early English Drama, especially the works of Thomas Nashe and Shakespeare; he was one of the founder members of the Malone Society.
- the history of the English book trade in the early-modern period; he made three substantial contributions in this field: Printers' and Publishers' Devices in England and Scotland, 1485–1640 (1913), Title-Page Borders used in England and Scotland, 1485–1640 (with F. S. Ferguson) (1932), and under his general editorship the volume for 1557–1640 in the Bibliographical Society's Dictionaries of the printers and booksellers who were at work in England, Scotland and Ireland, 1557–1775 (1910).
- the theory and practice of historical and textual bibliography: firstly, his major edition of the works of Thomas Nash (1904); his An Introduction to Bibliography for Literary Students (1927) which remains a standard work (supplemented now by Philip Gaskell's New Introduction to Bibliography, 1972); and the Prolegomena for the Oxford Shakespeare (1939) which was intended to be the introduction for a full scientific critical edition of Shakespeare which was unfinished at his death.
- With A. W. Pollard and W. W. Greg, R. B. McKerrow was one of the three great figures of English bibliography of the first half of the twentieth century.
- In 'An Introduction to Bibliography for Literary Students', (1927), on the Long s question, McKerrow wrote: "Though it would be amusing to do so, there seems to be no reason to accept the legend that John Bell (publisher) initiated the change, (to the short 'S') in his edition of Shakespeare because of his dismay at the appearance of the long s in Ariel's song in The Tempest: i.e.: "Where the bee sucks, there suck I."

== Selected publications ==
- edition of Thomas Nashe, The Works of Thomas Nashe. Edited from the original texts, London: A. H. Bullen, 1904
- edition of Thomas Dekker, The gull's horn-book, London : De la More Press, 1904.
- edition of Barnabe Barnes, The Divils Charter: a Tragædie conteining the Life and Death of Pope Alexander the sixt ..., Louvain, 1904.
- A Dictionary of printers and booksellers in England, Scotland and Ireland, and of foreign printers of English books 1557–1640., London, 1910 (ed., for the Bibliographical Society); reprinted in Dictionaries of the printers and booksellers who were at work in England, Scotland and Ireland, 1557–1775 (1977).
- Printers' & Publishers' Devices in England & Scotland 1485–1640. London : Printed for the Bibliographical Society at the Chiswick Press, 1913. on-line digitised version
- Title-page Borders used in England & Scotland, 1485–1640, London, 1932 (with F. S. Ferguson).
- An Introduction to Bibliography for Literary Students, Oxford : Clarendon Press, 1927 (reprint, with an introduction by David McKitterick, Oak Knoll Press, 1995).
- Prolegomena for the Oxford Shakespeare : a study in editorial method, Oxford : Clarendon Press, 1939.
- Ronald Brunlees McKerrow : a Selection of his Essays, Metuchen, N.J. : Scarecrow Press, 1974. (ed. John Phillip Immroth)

== See also ==
- Books in the United Kingdom
