= Peter W. M. Blayney =

British bibliographer and scholar

- Born: January 22, 1944; Cambridge
- Occupation: Independent Scholar
- Known for: The Stationers' Company and the Printers of London; The First Folio of Shakespeare

Peter W. M. Blayney is a British independent scholar and a leading expert on the book trade in Tudor and early Stuart London.

== Early life and education ==
Blayney was born on 22 January 1944 in Cambridge, England.

He studied at the Royal College of Advanced Technology, Bristol Old Vic Theatre School, Northwestern Polytechnic and earned his BA and the University of London and his PhD at Trinity College, Cambridge.

== Career ==
Blayney is currently an adjunct professor of English at the University of Toronto.

Blayney was awarded the 1982 Wheatley Medal by the Society of Indexers. He was awarded a Guggenheim Fellowship in 1997 for research in bibliography.

Blayney is a distinguished member of the Folger Institute where he has lectured on "The Shakespeare First Folio, 1622-1930," directed the seminar, Printing and Publishing in the Age of Shakespeare, and served as a faculty member for the National Endowment for the Humanities course, "Habits of Reading in Early Modern England."

In a review of Blayney's The Stationers’ Company and the Printers of London, 1501–1557, Ian Gadd noted, "I cannot overstate the importance of Blayney’s history for our understanding of the Stationers’ Company and the development of London book trade up to 1557. No one else could have written this work, and the Company is unlikely to have a better or more diligent historian."

In 2023 Blayney was awarded the Gold Medal for distinguished services to bibliography by The Bibliographical Society

== Personal life ==
Blayney currently resides in Toronto, Canada.

== Books ==
Blayney's notable books include:

- The Texts of King Lear and their Origins: Nicholas Okes and the First Quarto, 1982
- The bookshops in Paul's Cross Churchyard, 1990
- The First Folio of Shakespeare, 1991
- The Stationers' Company before the charter, 2003
- The Stationers' Company and the Printers of London, 2013
- The Printing and the Printers of the Book of Common Prayer, 1549-1561, 2021

== Articles ==
- Blayney Peter W. M. (2007). “STC Publication Statistics: Some Caveats.” The Library: 387–97.
- Blayney, Peter W. M. (2017). “A Dry Discourse on Wet Paper (and Ink).” Library 18.4: 387–404.
- Blayney, Peter W M. (2018). “Thomas Marshe Invents the Press Figure.” Library 19.4: 455–468.
- Blayney Peter W M. (2019). “If It Looks Like a Register ….” The Library 230–42.
- Blayney Peter W M. (2019). “Initials Within Initials.” The Library 443–61.
- Blayney Peter W M. (2021). “The Flowers in the Muses Garland.” The Library 316–43.
- Blayney, Peter W M. (2022) “Two Tales of Piracy.” Library 23.1 : 3–24.
- Blayney Peter W. M. (2022). “Some Biographical Notes on Richard Bradock (and Others).” The Library: The Transactions of the Bibliographical Society: 422–34.
