= E. K. Chambers =

English literary critic and Shakespeare scholar (1866–1954)

Sir Edmund Kerchever Chambers KBE CB FBA
- Portrait by Walter Stoneman, 1926
- Born: March 16, 1866; West Ilsley, Berkshire, England
- Died: January 21, 1954 (aged 87); Beer, Devon, England
- Education: Marlborough College; Corpus Christi College, Oxford
- Notable work: The Mediaeval Stage (1903); The Elizabethan Stage (1923); William Shakespeare (1930)
- Spouse: Eleanor Bowman (m. 1893)

Sir Edmund Kerchever Chambers, KBE CB FBA (16 March 1866 – 21 January 1954), usually known as E. K. Chambers, was an English literary critic and Shakespearean scholar. His four-volume work on The Elizabethan Stage, published in 1923, remains a standard resource.

== Life ==
Chambers was born in West Ilsley, Berkshire. His father was a curate there, and his mother was the daughter of a Victorian theologian. He was educated at Marlborough College before matriculating at Corpus Christi College, Oxford. He won a number of prizes, including the chancellor's prize in English for an essay on literary forgery in 1891. He took a job with the national education department, and married Eleanor Bowman in 1893.

In the newly created Board of Education, Chambers worked principally to oversee adult and continuing education. There, he rose to the position of second secretary, but the work for which he is remembered took place outside the office, sometime before he retired from the Board in 1926. He was the first president of the Malone Society, serving from 1906 to 1939. He edited collections of verse for Oxford University Press. He produced a work on King Arthur and a privately printed collection of poems.

However, Chambers's great work, begun before he even left Oxford, was an extensive examination of the history and conditions of English theatre in the medieval and Renaissance periods. He pursued the project for three decades, and it was published in three bursts. The Mediaeval Stage, issued in 1903, offered a comprehensive survey of medieval theatre, covering not only the fairly well-known interludes, but also the then-obscure folk drama, minstrelsy, and liturgical drama. The Elizabethan Stage followed after two decades. The Elizabethan Stage, though containing less original discovery than its predecessor, was often referenced to describe the material conditions of English Renaissance theatre. It is no longer considered reliable, since Chambers misrepresents the royal household as an organizational entity in general, and the duties of the Master of Revels, in particular. His two-volume work on Shakespeare came in 1930, which collected and analyzed the extant evidence of Shakespeare's work and life. Current scholarship does not consider the relationship between "liturgical drama" and stage performance to have been as strong as Chambers argues.

In his retirement, Chambers produced works on Coleridge (1938) and Matthew Arnold (1947). After moving to Eynsham, Oxfordshire, he returned to medieval history, producing a volume in the Oxford history and a local study of Eynsham. He died on 21 January 1954 at Beer, Devon, at the age of 87.

Chambers was appointed a Companion of the Order of the Bath (CB) in 1912, and a Knight Commander of the Order of the British Empire (KBE) in the 1925 Birthday Honours. In 1924, he was elected fellow of the British Academy and his biography Samuel Taylor Coleridge was awarded the 1938 James Tait Black Memorial Prize.

He was a member of the Athenæum.

== Works ==
- The History and Motives of Literary Forgeries (1891)
- Poems of John Donne (1896, editor)
- The Tragedy of Coriolanus (1898, editor)
- The Mediaeval Stage (2 volumes, 1903); Vol. I Vol. II
- Early English Lyrics (1907, editor)
- Carmina Argentea (1918, poems)
- The Elizabethan Stage (4 volumes, 1923); Vol. I Vol. II Vol. III Vol. IV
- Shakespeare: A Survey (1925)
- Arthur of Britain (1927)
- William Shakespeare: A Study of Facts and Problems (2 volumes; 1930)
  - Vol. I
- The Oxford Book of Sixteenth Century Verse (1932, editor)
- The English Folk-play (1933)
- Sir Henry Lee (1936)
- Eynsham Under the Monks (1936)
- Sir Thomas Wyatt and Some Collected Studies (1937)
- Samuel Taylor Coleridge: a biographical study (1938)
- Shakespearean Gleanings (1941)
- English Literature at the Close of the Middle Ages (1945)
- Matthew Arnold (1947).
