= Universal Short Title Catalogue =

Bibliographic database

Coordinates: 56.339778°N 2.794211°W

The Universal Short Title Catalogue (USTC) brings together information on all books published in Europe and its colonies between the invention of printing and the end of the seventeenth century, creating a powerful resource for the study of the book and print culture.

The project has a searchable interface, which brings together data from established national bibliographical projects and new projects undertaken by the project team based at the University of St Andrews, with partners in University College Dublin. This new work builds upon the principles established by the St Andrews French Vernacular Book project, completed and published in 2007 (FB volumes 1 & 2).

New work undertaken in St Andrews has created bibliographies of Latin books published in France (FB volumes 3 & 4) and of books published in the Low Countries (NB). The project team has also collected and analysed information on books published in Eastern Europe and Scandinavia. Meanwhile, partners in University College Dublin created a bibliography of books published in the Iberian Peninsula (IB).

In 2011 this was all brought together with information on books published in Italy, Germany and Britain to create a fully searchable resource covering all of Europe. This provides access to the full bibliographic information, locations of surviving copies and, where available, digital full text editions that can be accessed through the database. All told, this information encompasses approximately 350,000 editions and around 1.5 million surviving copies, located in over 5,000 libraries worldwide.

The USTC also hosts a series of conferences held annually in St Andrews in September. The project is also associated with the Library of the Written Word published by Brill, also the publishers of the printed bibliographies.

The USTC is funded via a grant from the Arts and Humanities Research Council. A related project on medical books in the sixteenth century is funded by the Wellcome Trust.

== History ==
The USTC project began as the St Andrews French Vernacular Books Project in 1997 with a survey of all books printed in the French language.

This led to a world-wide search, with the team conducting research in over 150 libraries over the course of a ten-year research project. The St Andrews project team were able to develop a database containing information on over 52,000 editions, surviving in over 175,000 copies located in 1,600 libraries world-wide. Of these books around thirty per cent were located only in libraries outside France; almost half, 22,000 are known only from a single surviving copy.

The project was sustained by a sequence of grants from the Arts and Humanities Research Council and British Academy. With the most recent grant for the new USTC project, this is the largest sequence of grants won in open competition by a Humanities project at the University of St Andrews.

At its conclusion the French project led to publication of a two volume hard copy short title catalogue: FB. French Vernacular Books. Books published in the French language before 1601.

== Research environment ==
The invention of printing in the fifteenth century revolutionised information culture, vastly multiplying the number of books in circulation. It had a transforming impact on the intellectual culture of the Renaissance. The invention attracted enormous attention, and the art of printing spread quickly through the European continent. In the next 150 years publishers brought out a huge number of texts in a large range of disciplines. These included thousands of Bibles as well as milestones of scientific publication. Printing also stimulated the production of new types of books, such as news pamphlets, and the influential propaganda works of the Protestant Reformation. Overall this amounted to a huge volume of books: at least 350,000 separate editions, a total of around two hundred million printed items.

The history of print has always played a central role in the development of modern European society. Despite this, the knowledge base on which such interpretations are based is surprisingly flimsy. Astonishingly, to this point, it has never been possible to create a complete survey of all printed books in the first age of print.

The corpus of materials is very large, and widely dispersed. Many books from the fifteenth and sixteenth centuries survive in only one copy. These unique items are distributed between around 6000 separate archives and libraries around the world.

Until this point data on early printed books has been available principally through national bibliographical projects. These have achieved some notable results. The German VD 16 has gathered information on some 90,000 editions published in German lands. The Italian Edit 16 lists 60,000 editions published in Italy. The English Short Title Catalogue is a comprehensive survey of all books published in English.

Nevertheless, this tradition of national bibliography has two main drawbacks. Firstly, national bibliographies are seldom complete. For practical and funding reasons the German VD 16 and Italian Edit 16 both confine their searches to books presently located in German and Italian libraries respectively. Yet sixteenth-century books were dispersed very widely; many books survive only in libraries far away from their place of production. Secondly, the coverage of Europe by these projects is far from comprehensive.

- There has as yet been no complete survey of France, the third major language domain of early print.
- There is no survey of printing in Spain and Portugal.
- The surveys for Belgium and the Netherlands are seriously deficient.
- Printing in Eastern Europe and Scandinavia has been surveyed only in small disparate projects dealing with a single language domain (Bohemia, Denmark, Hungary). There is no survey for Poland.

The USTC will make good these deficiencies in a project with two strands by completing the coverage of European print by gathering comprehensive date on all parts of Europe lacking such a survey. Finally, the USTC will co-ordinate the merging of these resources with other cognate projects into a coherent, unified searchable database.

== Publications ==
- Andrew Pettegree, Malcolm Walsby & Alexander Wilkinson (eds.), French Vernacular Books. Books Published in the French Language before 1601, 2 vols. (Leiden: Brill, 2007)
- Alexander Wilkinson (ed.), Iberian Books. Books Published in Spanish or Portuguese or on the Iberian Peninsula before 1601, (Leiden: Brill, 2010)
- Andrew Pettegree & Malcolm Walsby (eds.), Netherlandish Books. Books Published in the Low Countries and Dutch Books Printed Abroad before 1601, 2 vols. (Leiden: Brill, 2011)
- Andrew Pettegree & Malcolm Walsby (eds.), French Books. Books published in France before 1601 in Latin and languages other than French, 2 vols. (Leiden: Brill, 2011)
