= Consortium of European Research Libraries =

Consortium of libraries

The Consortium of European Research Libraries (CERL) is a consortium of research libraries, primarily in Europe, that facilitates access to historians with an interest in the history of the book by providing online resources. The organisation also makes grants to librarians, holds seminars and workshops, and since 1998 has published a periodical called CERL Papers. It was founded in 1992 and since 2021 has been registered in the Republic of Ireland as a company limited by guarantee, based in Dublin.

== Organisation ==
The Consortium of European Research Libraries is governed by a board of directors and a management team. The chair is Claudia Fabian, formerly of the Bavarian State Library, who was appointed in 2023 to succeed Kristian Jensen, former head of collections at the British Library. Its annual general meeting is usually held in October or November.

== Member institutions ==
As of May 2024 the consortium has 267 members, primarily in Europe, but also in the US and in Central and South America. Of these, single members (full fee) and special members (who pay a reduced fee) have one vote at the annual general meeting; groups of not more than 16 libraries share one vote; and cluster members associated with a single member may not vote.

== Online resources ==
=== Heritage of the Printed Book Database ===
The Heritage of the Printed Book Database, formerly the Hand Press Book Database, as of May 2024 contained over 6 million entries for books printed during the hand press era, from the introduction of printing technology to Europe in around 1455 to around 1830, with descriptions facilitating comparison of variant versions. Over 22 institutions have contributed entries, which are primarily based on examination of the item rather than on retroconversion of earlier bibliographic entries. The database is continuously updated, primarily by member institutions. Access to the HPB database is free.

=== Material Evidence in Incunabula ===
Material Evidence in Incunabula is a database of 15th-century printed works (incunabula) that draws on the Incunabula Short Title Catalogue of the British Library and combines them with data about individual copies. Its development was initially funded by the British Academy. Access to the MEI database is free.

=== CERL Thesaurus ===
The CERL Thesaurus, managed by the Data Conversion Group in Göttingen, indexes locations, printers, publishers and authors for works printed between c. 1450 and 1850, and thus serves in association with the Integrated Authority File to cross-reference variant names in printings and catalogues. It is automatically updated with the Material Evidence in Incunabula database and offers links to information on provenance provided by CERL member institutions, reflecting now dispersed collections, and also includes digitised material such as images of printer's marks collected by Vindel, Ronald McKerrow and Philippe Renouard and of watermarks. Access to the thesaurus is free.

=== CERL Portal ===
The CERL Portal was developed by the Electronic Publishing Centre of the Uppsala University Library after the completion of the CERL Manuscripts Project. It permitted combined searches of both manuscripts and printed books, in manuscript databases, the HPB and additional relevant online databases such as the English Short-Title Catalogue and photograph databases. It was discontinued in 2020.

== Sources ==
- Estermann, Monika (1997). "Auf dem Weg zu einem europäischen Gesamtkatalog: Zur Tagung des Consortium of European Research Libraries (CERL) in München". Buchhandelsgeschichte (in German). 1997/4. Historischee Kommission des Börsenvereins des Deutschen Buchhandels: 197–99.
- Fabian, Claudia (1991). "Altbestandskatalogisierung als Gemeinschaftsaufgabe Europas: Bericht über die International Conference on Retrospective Cataloguing in Europe, 15th to 19th century materials, vom 28. bis 30. November 1990 in München". Zeitschrift für Bibliothekswesen und Bibliographie (in German). 38: 227–35.
- Fabian, Claudia (1992). "Die Gründung der Eurodatenbank für Altbestandskatalogisierung in Europa: Bericht über die zweite International Conference on Retrospective Cataloguing in Europe, 15th to 19th century printed materials, vom 29. bis 30. Januar 1992 in München". Zeitschrift für Bibliothekswesen und Bibliographie (in German). 39: 207–16.
- Fabian, Claudia (1994). "Das Consortium of European Research Libraries (CERL) und die Gründung einer Datenbank für frühe europäische Drucke (1450–1830)". Zeitschrift für Bibliothekswesen und Bibliographie (in German). 41: 11–17.
- Fabian, Claudia (1997). "Die 'Hand Press Book Database' des Consortium of European Research Libraries". In Wefers, Sabine (ed.). Von Gutenberg zum Internet: 7. Deutscher Bibliothekskongress, 87. Deutscher Bibliothekartag in Dortmund 1997. Zeitschrift für Bibliothekswesen und Bibliographie Sonderhefte (in German). Vol. 68. Frankfurt: Klostermann. pp. 61–69. ISBN 9783465029618.
