= Bibliographical Society =

British organisation

- The Bibliographical Society
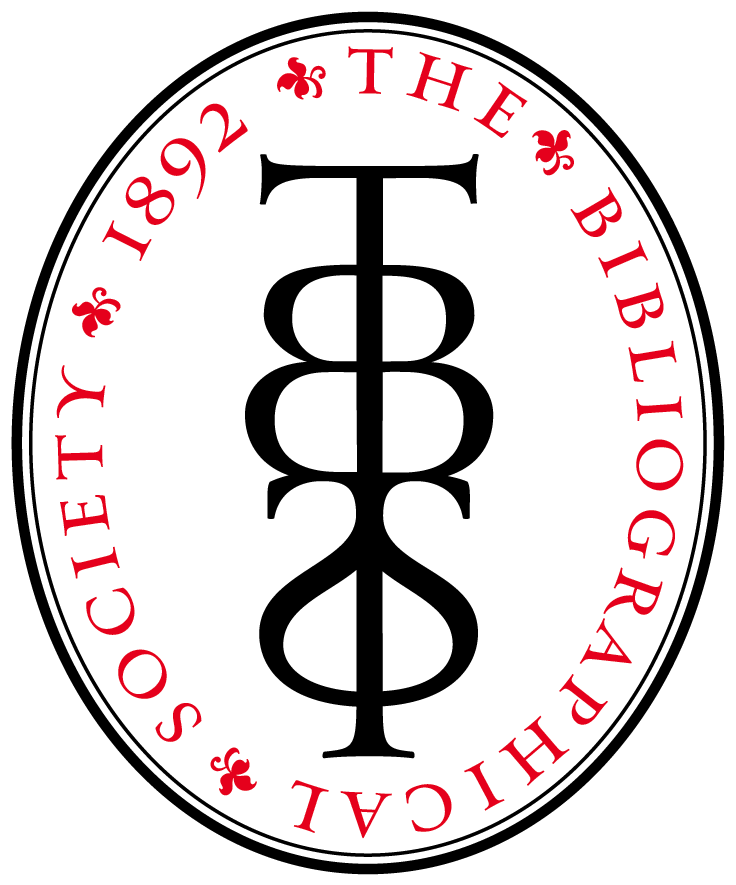
- Logo
- Formation: 1892
- Founded at: London, England, UK
- Type: Learned society
- Legal status: Charity
- Headquarters: University of London, Senate House, Malet Street, London WC1E 7HU
- Fields: History of books and publishing
- Official language: English
- Key people: Walter Arthur Copinger; Richard Copley Christie; Alfred W Pollard; W W Greg; Ronald B McKerrow
- Website: http://www.bibsoc.org.uk/about

Founded in 1892, The Bibliographical Society is the senior learned society in the UK dealing with the study of the book and its history. The Society promotes and encourages study and research in historical, analytical, descriptive and textual bibliography through its lectures, fellowships and bursaries, and publishing its quarterly journal, The Library.

The Society holds a monthly lecture between October and May, usually on the third Tuesday of the month at the Society of Antiquaries of London, at Burlington House.

The first fifty years of the Bibliographical Society were documented in the book The Bibliographical Society, 1892–1942: Studies in Retrospect. The Book Encompassed, a volume of essays edited by Peter Davison marking the Society's centenary was published in 1992.

== History ==
The Bibliographical Society was founded on 15 July 1892, with W. A. Copinger, a lawyer and book collector, serving as its first President after proposing its formation at a Library Association meeting the previous year. The Society was established to promote study and research in historical, analytical, descriptive, and textual bibliography, as well as the history of printing, publishing, bookselling, bookbinding, and collecting. By the outbreak of the First World War, membership had grown sufficiently for the Society to consider limiting it to 325, though this proposal was abandoned. In 1919, the Society took over The Library, a journal which had existed independently since 1888, and continues to publish it quarterly.

The Society's most significant achievement is the Short-Title Catalogue of Books Printed in England, Scotland & Ireland and of English Books Printed Abroad 1475–1640, compiled by A. W. Pollard and G. R. Redgrave and published in 1926. A comprehensive revision by W. A. Jackson, F. S. Ferguson, and Katharine Pantzer appeared in three volumes between 1976 and 1991. Other major publications include W. W. Greg's four-volume Bibliography of the English Printed Drama to the Restoration (1939–1959), the Cathedral Libraries Catalogue, and dictionaries of printers and booksellers. The Society took over The Library journal in 1919, which it continues to publish quarterly.

The Society's early work was shaped by three figures whom F. P. Wilson termed "a happy band of brothers": A. W. Pollard, W. W. Greg, and R. B. McKerrow. Their contributions to what became known as the "New Bibliography" profoundly influenced literary scholarship in the twentieth century. Since 1929, the Society has awarded its medal to forty-eight scholars for outstanding contributions to the field.

== Objectives ==
The objectives of the Society are:

- to promote and encourage study and research in the fields of:
  - historical, analytical, descriptive and textual bibliography
  - the history of printing, publishing, bookselling, bookbinding and collecting
- to hold meetings at which papers are read and discussed
- to print and publish a journal (The Library) and books concerned with bibliography
- to maintain a bibliographical library
- from time to time to award a medal for services to bibliography
- to support bibliographical research by awarding grants and bursaries

== Library and archives ==
The Society's library was housed at Stationers' Hall in the City of London but moved to Senate House in January 2007. In 2017 it moved again to the Albert Sloman Library at the University of Essex.

The Society's archive is housed at the Bodleian Library and may be used by scholars and members of the Society.

== Publications ==
The Society has published a journal since 1893, originally entitled Transactions of the Bibliographical Society. In 1920 it took over publication of The Library (issued since 1889) and adopted that as the main title of the Transactions. (The Library was founded in 1889 by John Young Walker MacAlister.) The different series of the Transactions and The Library are:

- Transactions of the Bibliographical Society, vol. 1–15 (1893–1919)
- The Library, vol. 1–10 (1889–1898)
- The Library, Second/New series, vol. 1–10 (1900–1910)
- The Library, Third series, vol. 1–10 (1910–1919)
- The Library, Fourth series, vol. 1–26 (1920–1946)
- The Library, Fifth series, vol. 1–33 (1946–1978)
- The Library, Sixth series, vol. 1–21 (1979–1999)
- The Library, Seventh series, vol. 1– (2000– )

The Library (ISSN 0024-2160; 1744-8581) is a quarterly journal and is issued free to members who also receive a copy of all books published by the Society.

In 1937, Harry Carter, Ellic Howe, Alfred F. Johnson, Stanley Morison and Graham Pollard started to produce a list of all known pre-1800 type specimens. The list was published in The Library in 1942. However, because of the war, many libraries at the European continent were no longer accessible.

== Gold medal ==
The Society occasionally awards a gold medal for "distinguished services to bibliography to individuals who have made an outstanding contribution to the development of the subject and the furtherance of the Society's aims."

Bibliographical Society Gold Medallists
Year	Recipient
1929	Eames, Wilberforce
1929	Haebler, Konrad
1929	James, Montague Rhodes
1929	McKerrow, Ronald Brunlees
1929	Pollard, Alfred W.
1932	Madan, Falconer
1935	Kenyon, Frederic G.
1935	Greg, Walter Wilson
1948	Morison, Stanley
1948	Gibson, Strickland
1951	Ferguson, Frederic Sutherland
1951	Scholderer, Victor
1956	Kronenberg, Maria Elizabeth
1956	Johnson, Alfred Forbes
1957	Wroth, Lawrence C.
1960	Lowe, Elias Avery
1960	Oldham, J. Basil
1965	Jackson, William Alexander
1969	Bowers, Fredson
1969	Pollard, Graham
1975	Carter, John
1975	Ker, Neil Ripley
1978	Nixon, Howard M.
1982	Bischoff, Bernhard
1982	Keynes, Geoffrey
1984	Foxon, David
1986	Kristeller, Paul Oskar
1988	Pantzer, Katharine
1990	McKenzie, Donald Francis
1992	Hobson, Anthony R. A.
1994	Martin, Henri-Jean
1997	Alston, Robin
1999	Barker, Nicolas
1999	Fabian, Bernhard
2001	Watson, Andrew G.
2003	Davison, Peter Hobley
2005	McKitterick, David
2007	Rhodes, Dennis
2009	Hellinga, Lotte
2011	Needham, Paul
2013	Foot, Mirjam
2014	Doyle, Ian
2015	Tanselle, G. Thomas
2017	Mosley, James
2019	Carley, James P.
2021	Twyman, Michael
2023	Peter Blayney
2025	David J. Shaw

== See also ==
- Sir Frank Francis and Julian Roberts, former joint secretaries of the Society
- Society for the History of Authorship, Reading and Publishing
- Books in the United Kingdom
- Bibliographical Society of America
