= Alfred W. Pollard =

English literary scholar and bibliographer (1859–1944)

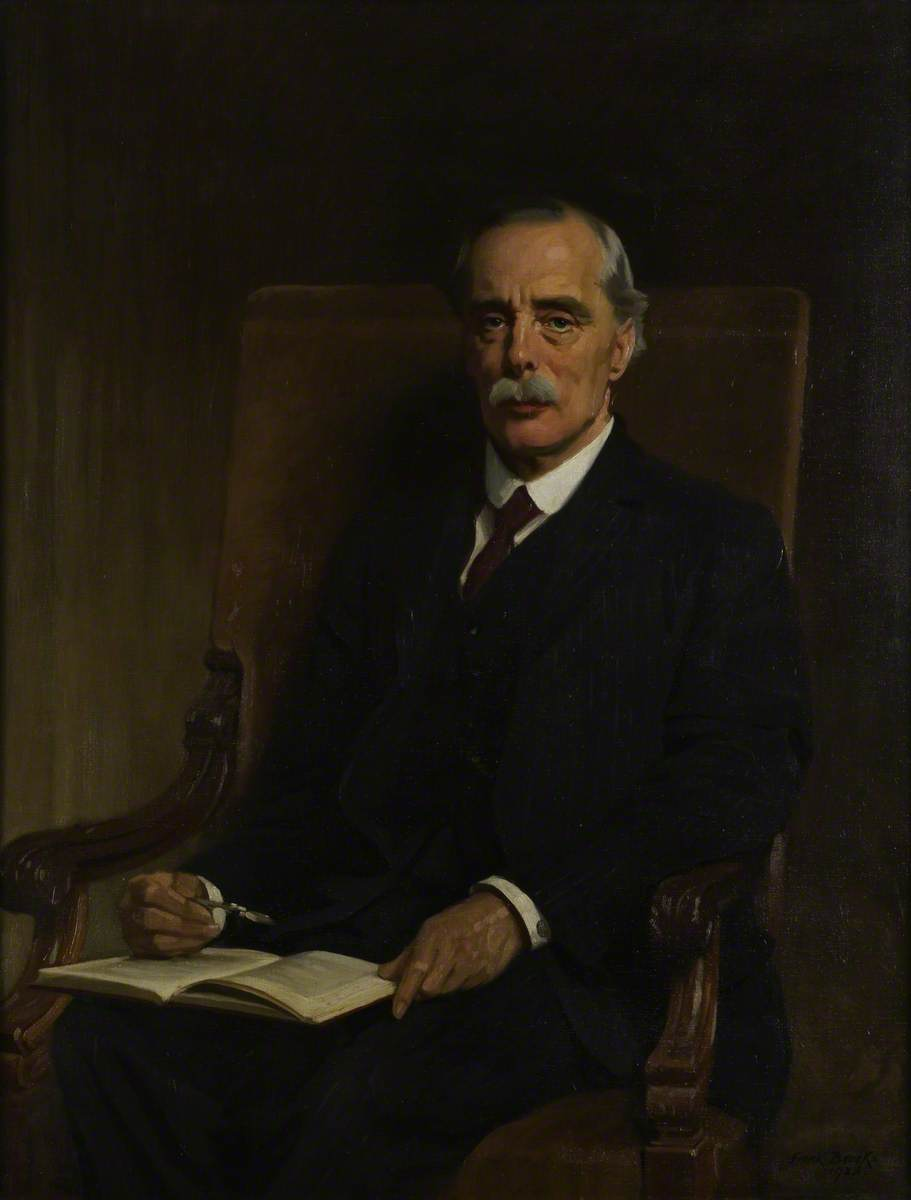
- 1928 painting of Pollard
- Born: 14 August 1859; Kensington, London, England
- Died: 8 March 1944 (aged 84); Wimbledon, London, England
- Education: St John's College, Oxford (MA)
- Occupations: Bibliographer; literary scholar
- Notable work: Shakespeare Folios and Quartos (1909)
- Spouse: Alice England (m. 1887)

Alfred William Pollard CB FBA (14 August 1859 – 8 March 1944) was an English bibliographer and scholar of English literature. He is widely credited with bringing a higher level of scholarly rigour to the study of Shakespearean texts.

== Early life ==
Pollard was born on 14 August 1859 at 1 Brompton Square, Kensington, London, the youngest son of physician Edward William Pollard and his wife, Emma Louisa. After spending his early education at a dame school, he began attending King's College School on the Strand in 1870 and, at age 15, was awarded the school's scholarship for classics. During his seven years at King's, Pollard first developed his interest in Chaucer and Shakespeare, and befriended the painter Walter Sickert.

In November 1876, Pollard sought out a scholarship to attend Balliol College, Oxford, but instead won a scholarship to study literae humaniores at St John's College, Oxford, where he graduated with a double first, earning his B.A. in 1881 and his M.A. in 1885. He had attained first classes in classical moderations in 1879 and in literae humaniores in 1881. It was as a student at Oxford that Pollard began his lifelong friendship with A. E. Housman, which he described as "the best thing I got from Oxford".

== Career ==
Unable to teach because of his pronounced stammer, he joined the staff of the British Museum in 1883, as assistant in the department of printed books; he was promoted to assistant keeper in 1909, and keeper in 1919. In the latter year, Pollard was appointed professor of English bibliography at the University of London. He was honorary secretary of the Bibliographical Society from 1893 to 1934 and edited the society's journal The Library for thirty years (1903–34). He received the society's gold medal in 1929.

Pollard wrote widely on a range of subjects in English literature throughout his career, and collaborated with various scholars in specialized studies; he edited Sir Philip Sidney's Astrophel in 1888, Chaucer's Canterbury Tales (Globe edition, 1898), a collection of Fifteenth Century Poetry and Prose (1903) and Thomas Malory's Le Morte d'Arthur (1910–11, in four volumes). His Shakespeare Folios and Quartos: a Study in the Bibliography of Shakespeare's Plays, 1594–1685, published in 1909, remains an important milestone in Shakespearian criticism.

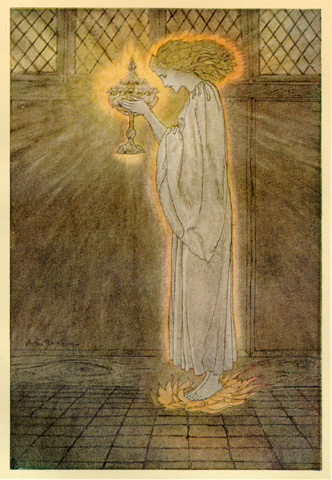
"How at the Castle of Corbin a Maiden Bare in the Sangreal and Foretold the Achievements of Galahad", Arthur Rackham's illustration to Pollard's The Romance of King Arthur and His Knights of the Round Table (1917).

He edited the Books about Books (Kegan Paul, Trench, Trübner), the English Bookman's Library (Kegan Paul, Trench, Trübner) and Messages of the Saints (Sidgwick & Jackson) book series. With Gilbert Richard Redgrave, he edited the STC, or A short-title catalogue of books printed in England, Scotland, & Ireland and of English books printed abroad, 1475–1640 (1926). He provided a bibliographical introduction to a facsimile print of the 1611 King James Bible which was produced for its three hundredth anniversary. His contemporary friends included the poet A. E. Housman and the artist Walter Sickert, and he was a close colleague of the prominent Shakespeare scholars Edmund Kerchever Chambers and R. B. McKerrow.

== Personal life and death ==
Pollard married Alice England of Newnham College, Cambridge, in 1887 and they had two sons and a daughter. But during the war both his two sons were lost in action: his oldest, Geoffrey Blemell Pollard, a lieutenant in the Royal Field Artillery, was killed in the fighting near Le Baseé, France, on 24 October 1914. Then a year later, on 13 October 1915, his second son Roger Thompson Pollard, a lieutenant in the 5th Royal Berkshire Regiment, was also killed. Pollard wrote a memorial, Two Brothers. Accounts Rendered, which was privately printed for friends in 1916, and a year later issued by Sidgwick and Jackson.

In 1935 Pollard suffered a fall while gardening which seriously affected him, but he lived another nine years, dying at Wimbledon Hospital, aged 85, survived by his daughter. He is buried with his wife Alice (1857-1925) in the churchyard of St Mary's Church, Wimbledon.

== Works ==
- Last Words on the History of the Title-page, with Notes on Some Colophons and Twenty-seven Fac-similes of Title-pages (London: John C. Nimmo, 1891}
- Chaucer (London: Macmillan and Co, 1893; Literature Primer series)
- Early Illustrated Books: A History of the Decoration and Illustration of Books in the 15th and 16th Centuries (London: Kegan Paul, Trench, Trübner, and Co., and New York: Charles Scribner's Sons, 1893; Books about Books series)
- Italian Book Illustrations, Chiefly of the Fifteenth Century, (London: Seeley and Co., and New York: Macmillan & Co., 1894)
- English Miracle Plays, Moralities and Interludes: Specimens of the Pre-Elizabethan Drama, Oxford at the Clarendon Press, 1894 (second revised edition).
  - fourth revised edition, 1904.
- (ed.) Fifteenth Century Poetry and Prose, London, 1903.
- Books in the House: An Essay on Private Libraries and Collections for Young and Old. Published by arrangement with Ralph Fletcher Seymour. (Indianapolis: Bobbs-Merrill, 1904)
- An Essay on Colophons, with Specimens and Translations, by Alfred W. Pollard, and an introduction by Richard Garnett (Chicago: The Caxton Club, 1905)
- Shakespeare Folios and Quartos: A Study in the Bibliography of Shakespeare's Plays (London: Methuen, 1909)
- Le Morte d'Arthur by Sir Thomas Malory (Unabridged 4 volumes: 1910-11; Unabridged 2 volumes: 1920, Illustrator: Sir William Russell Flint; and Abridged: 1917, Illustrator: Arthur Rackham)
- (ed. with an introduction by Pollard) Records of the English Bible: The Documents Relating to the Translation and Publication of the Bible in English, 1525–1611, London, Oxford University Press, 1911.
- Fine Books, London: Methuen & Co., 1912 (The Connoisseur’s Library); New York: G. P. Putnam's Sons, 1912 (The Connoisseur’s Library).
- A New Shakespeare Quarto: Richard II, 1916.
- Tales of King Arthur and the Knights of the Round Table, abridged from Le Morte d'Arthur (New York: The Macmillan Company, 1917)
- Shakespeare's Fight with the Pirates and the Problems of the Transmission of His Text, 1917.
- Two Brothers: Accounts Rendered (London: Sidgwick & Jackson, 1917)
- St. Catherine of Siena, London: Sidgwick & Jackson, 1919; Messages of the Saints series)
- The Foundations of Shakespeare's Text, 1923. Annual Shakespeare Lecture of the British Academy.
- Shakespeare's Hand in the Play of Sir Thomas More (with W. W. Greg, Edward Maunde Thompson, John Dover Wilson and R. W. Chambers) (Cambridge: University Press, 1923)
- The Trained Printer and the Amateur, and the Pleasure of Small Books (London: Langston Monotype Corporation, 1929)
- A Census of Shakespeare's Plays in Quarto 1594-1709 (with Henrietta C. Bartlett) (New Haven: Yale University Press, 1939)
