= Bibliographical Society of America =

The Bibliographical Society of America (BSA) is a North American organization that fosters the study of books and manuscripts. It was constituted from the earlier Bibliographical Society of Chicago (created in 1899) as the national membership began to exceed local membership. The organization publishes the scholarly journal, Papers of the Bibliographical Society of America, as well as books on topics of bibliographic interest.

== History ==
- Lee Shiflett provides the history of the philosophical beliefs of academic librarians in the late 19th and early 20th century. An essay published in Libraries, Books and Culture, by Wayne A. Wiegand detailed the politics surrounding the formation of the Bibliographical Society of America through its split from the American Library Association and the reconstituting of the Bibliographical Society of Chicago into a national organization.
- Three retrospectives of the organization have been published in the Papers in 1941, 1979, and 2004. The latter two became the basis for entries in the 1969 and 2018 editions of the Encyclopedia of Library and Information Sciences, respectively.
- To commemorate the 75th anniversary of the BSA a retrospective collection of articles was published in 1980: The Bibliographical Society of America, 1904-79. The introduction was by Thomas R. Adams, president in 1978-1980. The concluding contribution, "The State of Bibliography Today, " by G. Thomas Tanselle was the text of his address presented at the annual meeting of the BSA at the Pierpont Morgan Library on January 26, 1979.
- The centenary of the Bibliographical Society, precursor of the BSA, was marked by William P. Barlow, Jr.'s address in 1991.
- A Presidential Colloquium on the 100th anniversary of the BSA was held September 2005.

== Publications ==
The University of Chicago Press publishes the Papers of the Bibliographical Society of America and maintains access to past issues dating back to the beginning of the journal in 1904. In 2023 the Papers of the Bibliographical Society of America underwent a redesign from Caslon typeface to New Century Schoolbook.

Books published by the BSA are distributed by Oak Knoll Books and include:

- Alden, John Eliot. 1942. John Mein, Publisher: An Essay in Bibliographic Detection. [New York]: Bibliographical Society of America.
- Eddy, Donald D., Bibliographical Society of America, and American Council of Learned Societies. 1971. A Bibliography of John Brown. ACLS Humanities E-Book. New York: Bibliographical Society of America.
- Shaaber, M. A. 1975. Check-List of Works of British Authors Printed Abroad, in Languages Other than English, to 1641. New York: Bibliographical Society of America.
- Fogelmark, Staffan. 1990. Flemish and Related Panel-Stamped Bindings : Evidence and Principles. New York: Bibliographical Society of America.
- Huttner, Sidney F., and Elizabeth Stege Huttner. 1993. A Register of Artists, Engravers, Booksellers, Bookbinders, Printers & Publishers in New York City, 1821-42. New York: Bibliographical Society of America.
- Carpenter, Kenneth E. 2002. The Dissemination of the Wealth of Nations in French and in France, 1776-1843. New York: Bibliographical Society of America.

== Awards ==
The Bibliographical Society of America recognizes excellence in scholarship, nurtures new research in the field, and supports contributions by emerging bibliographers.

Triennial

- William L. Mitchell Prize for Bibliography or Documentary Work on Early British Periodicals or Newspapers. (Triennial)
- Justin G. Schiller Prize for Bibliographical Work on Pre-20th-Century Children’s Books. (Triennial)
- St. Louis Mercantile Library Prize for scholarship in the bibliography of American history and literature. (Triennial)

Annual

- BSA-ASECS Fellowship for Bibliographical Studies in the Eighteenth Century
- BSA-Harry Ransom Center Pforzheimer Fellowship in Bibliography to support the bibliographical study of early modern books and manuscripts, 1455–1700, held in the Ransom Center’s Pforzheimer Library.
- BSA-Mercantile Library Fellowship in North American Bibliography supports scholarship in North American bibliography
- BSA Peck-Stacpoole Fellowship for Early Career Collections
- BSA-Pine Tree Foundation Fellowship in Culinary Bibliography
- The BSA-Pine Tree Foundation Fellowship in Hispanic Bibliography
- Caxton Club Fellowship for Midwestern Bibliographers
- Dorothy Porter Wesley Fellowship for Black bibliographers.
- Katharine Pantzer Senior Fellowship in Bibliography and the British Book Trades
- Reese Fellowship for American Bibliography and the History of the Book in the Americas
- Charles J. Tanenbaum Fellowship in Cartographical Bibliography

New Scholars Awards

- D. F. McKenzie New Scholars Award
- Dorothy Porter Wesley award for New Scholars.

Short Term Awards

- BSA-Rare Book School Fellowship
- BSA Short-term Fellowships

== Margaret B. Stillwell Legacy Society ==
The Margaret B. Stillwell Legacy Society was established in 2020 to recognize the long tradition of giving at the Bibliographical Society of America. Its goal is "to ensure a vibrant future for tomorrow’s bibliographic scholars." It is named for Margaret B. Stillwell, a curator of the Annmary Brown Memorial Library who wrote Incunabula and Americana, 1450-1800; a Key to Bibliographical Study.

== See also ==
- List of presidents of the Bibliographical Society of America
