= History of the book (academic discipline) =

The history of the book or book history is an interdisciplinary academic discipline which studies the history of books and manuscripts from their creation, until their dissemination and reception. It treats books as material objects shaped by human culture and technology.

== History of the field ==
The field of book history appears at the convergence of three fields: history, literary studies, and bibliography. While all these disciplines have their own methodologies and practices, all of them can have the book, reading and publishing as fields of inquiry.

Some of the earlier published books considered as book history include William Ivins Jr.'s Prints and Visual Communication (1953), Henri-Jean Martin and Lucien Febvre's L'apparition du livre (The Coming of the Book: The Impact of Printing, 1450–1800) in 1958 as well as Marshall McLuhan's Gutenberg Galaxy: The Making of Typographic Man (1962).

A mark in the incipient field was the publication of The Printing Press as an Agent of Change by Elizabeth Eisenstein in 1980. The book brought a historiographical approach to earlier ideas about Gutenberg's influence, especially Marshall McLuhan's. She focused on how the movable type was able to create a function of standardization, an ease of dissemination and preservation, therefore creating what she calls Print culture, in opposition to the earlier existing Manuscript culture. Eisenstein has defended print culture as being capable of accelerating the Renaissance, the Scientific Revolution and the Reformation.

In the same year Robert Darnton published The Business of Enlightenment, which follows the history of a single book, Denis Diderot's Encyclopédie, analyzing its production, illegal copies and book piracy, and its reception to showcase how the ideas of the Age of Enlightenment spread around Europe.

Many scholars consider the field itself started with the publication of the article "What is the History of the Book?" by Robert Darnton, in which he proposes the communication circuit, an analogy with an electric circuit, as a way to analyze the life-cycle of books. Many works written afterwards tried to rework or challenge Darnton's models in other contexts. The article also generated a lot of discussion on whether book history was its own field, with G. Thomas Tanselle arguing that bibliography was already its own subfield of history, and not a separate field. James Raven on the other hand defended the Book History field as sufficiently broad to stand by itself.

In 2002 Eisenstein was involved in a debate with Adrian Johns in the American Historical Review over the degree to which printing was necessarily an agent of change, as she had defended in her work, or, as Johns argued, a vehicle of change which mostly carried messages that were shaped by outside social forces. This debate became known as the Eisenstein-Johns debate within Book History.

In the early 21st century a common criticism to book history was its Western-centric focus. Global Book History investigates manuscript traditions in East Asia, the Middle East, and Africa.

The rise of the Internet pushed book historians to study the changes it provoked to publishing and reading, such as the appearance of Ebooks and Audiobooks. Many historians have compared the transition to escreens to the historical transition from scrolls to codices.

It is related to other historiographical approaches such as cultural history, the history of literature, and intellectual history.

== Themes and approaches ==
=== Authorship ===
The problematization of the concept of author has long been central in book history. Michel Foucault has written about how it only became common to have an author's name in the cover of a book for them to be considered liable for transgressive speech.

=== Communication circuit ===
The communication circuit was proposed by Robert Darnton in 1982. It maps the life cycle of a book, as it moves from the author to a publisher, through printers, shippers, and booksellers, until it reaches the reader. The reader can also influence the author, closing the cycle.

=== Materiality ===
The book as a material object is an important object of study in Book History. It studies how the physical form of manuscripts and books, including typography, binding, and cover design affect how the reader experiences the book.

=== Print culture ===
Concept proposed by Elizabeth Eisenstein, who analyzes how the creation of the movable type by Gutenberg acted as an agent of change, accelerating the Renaissance, the Scientific Revolution and the Protest Reformation.

=== Sociology of texts ===
Proposed by D.F. McKenzie, this approach examines the human interactions involved in text production. It argues that a text cannot be separated from the economic and social conditions where it was created.

=== Textual criticism ===
Developed by Walter W. Greg and Fredson Bowers in the 1950s, textual criticism focuses on dismantling publisher and editor interventions, and attempting to reconstruct the text according to authorial intention. G. Thomas Tanselle later problematized the notion of an ideal "correct" form of the text. Due to their contributions, the method of editing is still known as the "Greg–Bowers–Tanselle" method.

== Important institutions ==
=== Professional associations ===
- Society for the History of Authorship, Reading and Publishing

=== Centers in universities ===
- Rare Book School in the University of Virginia
- California Rare Book School
- London Rare Book School
- The Center for Book Studies in Johannes Gutenberg University, Mainz
- The Center for Book History in Lund University
- Centre for Book Cultures and Publishing (CBCP) in the University of Reading, UK
- The Center for Book Studies in the University of Munster
- The Institut d'histoire du livre (Lyon, France)

=== Journals ===
- Book History
- Lingua Franca
- Sharp News
