= Tadmor =

Tadmor or Tadmur is an ancient Semitic name, and may refer to

== Places ==
- Tadmor, the native name of the ancient city of Palmyra, Syria
- Tadmor, the native name of Palmyra (modern city), Syria
- Tadmur District, Syria
- Tadmor Castle in Palmyra
- Tadmor Prison Palmyra
- Tadmor, Ohio a former town in the United States
- Tadmor River in New Zealand
- Tadmor, Texas

== Surname ==
- Eitan Tadmor, American mathematician
- Erez Tadmor, Israeli film director
- Erez Tadmor (publicist), Israeli publicist and political activist, cofounder of Im Tirtzu
- Hayim Tadmor, Israeli assyriologist
- Naomi Tadmor, British historian
- Zehev Tadmor Israeli chemical engineer

== Other ==
- Tadmor (planet), the exoplanet Gamma Cephei Ab

== See also ==
- Tadmore, Saskatchewan
