= James Raven =

British historian and bibliographer

James Russell Raven LittD FBA FSA (born 13 April 1959) is a British scholar specialising in the history of the book. His published works include The English Novel 1770–1829 (2000), What is the History of the Book? (2018) and The Oxford Illustrated History of the Book (2020). As of 2024, he was professor emeritus of history at the University of Essex, a life fellow of Magdalene College, Cambridge, and a professor in the humanities at the Norwegian University of Science and Technology (NTNU).

== Education and career ==
Born in Colchester, James Raven attended The Gilberd School in the town. He was the first in his family to go to university, when he won a place to study history at Clare College, Cambridge; he graduated with a BA in 1981 and PhD in 1985.

In 1985 he became a fellow of Pembroke College, Cambridge. In 1989 he was named Munby fellow in Bibliography (named for A. N. L. Munby) in the university. In 1990, he moved to Magdalene College, Cambridge to be a fellow and director of studies in history. In 1996 he was appointed university lecturer in the Modern History faculty at the University of Oxford and a fellow and tutor of Mansfield College, Oxford. In 2000, he was appointed reader in social and cultural history at Oxford. In 2004, he was appointed professor of modern history at the University of Essex. In 2012, he returned to Magdalene College as senior research fellow, where he also became a life fellow.

He was elected to the British Academy in 2019, and the Royal Historical Society in 2000.

== Scholarship ==
Raven's scholarly work examines British cultural history, especially book history of the eighteenth century.

Raven gave the Panizzi Lectures in 2010 on "London Booksites: Places of Printing and Publication before 1800". The lectures have been described as groundbreaking in their approach to various histories of place and space in publishing and book selling.

=== Selected publications ===
- Judging New Wealth: Popular Publishing and Responses to Commerce in England, 1750–1800 (Oxford University Press, 1992)
- The Practice and Representation of Reading in England (Cambridge University Press, 1996), with Helen Small and Naomi Tadmor (eds.)
- (ed.) Free Print and Non-Commercial Publishing (London and Vermont: Ashgate Press, 2000)
- The English Novel 1770–1829: A Bibliographical Survey of Prose Fiction Published in the British Isles, 2 vols. (Oxford University Press, 2000), with Peter Garside and Rainer Schöwerling)
- London Booksellers and American Customers: Transatlantic Literary Community and the Charleston Library Society, 1748–1811 (Columbia: University of South Carolina Press, 2002)
- (ed.) Lost Libraries: The Destruction of Book Collections Since Antiquity (Basingstoke: Palgrave Macmillan, 2004)
- The Business of Books: Booksellers and the English Book Trade 1450–1850 (London and New Haven: Yale University Press, 2007)
  - Awarded the Society for the History of Authorship, Reading and Publishing De Long prize for 2008
- Publishing Business in Eighteenth-Century England (Woodbridge: The Boydell Press, 2014)
- What is the History of the Book?. Cambridge, UK: Polity Press. 2018.
- Bookscape: Geographies of Printing and Publishing in London before 1800. (London: The British Library, 2014).
- (ed.) The Oxford Illustrated History of the Book. (Oxford University Press, 2020).

== Organizational affiliations ==
Raven was president of the Bibliographical Society (2020–2022). He is currently director of the Cambridge Project for the Book Trust and director of the Centre for Bibliographical History and a member of the Human Rights Centre at the University of Essex.

He joined the English-Speaking Union in 1976. He has been president of the Colchester Branch of the ESU since 1990, and has served as a national governor (2000–2006 and since 2012), deputy chairman, and since 2019, chairman in succession to Lord Paul Boateng.

He chairs the Lindemann Trust which awards annual fellowships in the sciences for postdoctoral research in the US by British and Commonwealth citizens. He was a trustee of Marks Hall, Essex, from 2010 to 2020, and of the Friends of St Andrew's Fingringhoe. He is a member of the Pilgrims and the Mid-Atlantic Club.

== See also ==
- Book trade in the United Kingdom
- Books in the United Kingdom
