= CHB =

CHB may refer to:

- Camp Half-Blood, a camp in Percy Jackson & the Olympians
- Central Hawkes Bay
- Centre for the History of the Book, University of Edinburgh
- Centre half-back in Australian rules football
- CHB Bank of South Korea
- Champion Homes, NASDAQ symbol CHB
- Chang Hwa Bank of Taiwan
- Chibcha language (ISO 639-2 and ISO 639-3 codes)
- Chilas Airport IATA code
- Children's Hospital Boston
- Chronic Hepatitis B
- Bachelor of Medicine and Surgery ChB
- Chumby Hacker Board
- Companion of Honour of Barbados, a class of membership of the defunct Order of Barbados (1980-2021)
- Complete Heart Block, a form of atrioventricular block within the heart
- Computers in Human Behavior, an academic journal specialized in the use of computers for psychological and education purposes
- Concrete Hollow Block
- Customs House Brokerage
