= Colchester Sixth Form College =

Coordinates: 51°53′28″N 0°53′42″E

The Sixth Form College Colchester

Location
- North Hill; Colchester, Essex, CO1 1SN; England

Information
- Type: Sixth form college
- Established: 1987
- Local authority: Essex
- Department for Education URN: 151134 Tables
- Ofsted: Reports
- Principal: Jo Cadman
- Gender: Coeducational
- Enrolment: 3200+
- Website: colchsfc.ac.uk

The Sixth Form College, Colchester is a sixth form college in Colchester, England. Established in 1987, it provides further education in the north Essex area.

== History ==
The college is located on the former site of the Gilberd School. Recently constructed parts of the building were designed by local architects Martin Wilesmith and Bob Ward of the Roff Marsh Partnership.

In 1994 Blur played a show at the college – three out of four members of Blur have links with Colchester, with drummer Dave Rowntree having attended the Gilberd School.

In 2013, the college served as the backdrop for a submission in the official Brian May and Kerry Ellis crowdsourced music video for "The Kissing Me Song". A portion of the submission can be seen in the subsequent concert release "The Candlelight Concerts: Live in Montreux 2013".

== Courses ==
The college offers courses and qualifications to more than 3100 students – including a large range of A-Levels and also a smaller number of GCSEs.

=== Departments ===
- Art and Design
  - Art
  - Photography
  - History of Art
  - Sculpture
- Biology
  - Biology
- Business Studies and Economics
  - Accounting
  - Business Studies
  - Applied Business
  - Economics
- Chemistry
  - Chemistry
- Computing
  - Computer Science
  - ICT
- English
  - English Language
  - English Literature
  - English Language & Literature
- Geography
  - Geography
  - Geology
  - Environmental Science
- History
  - Classical Civilisation
  - History – Modern
  - History – Early Modern
  - History – Medieval
  - Politics
  - Ancient History
- Law
  - Law
  - Applied Law
- Mathematics
  - Mathematics
  - Further Mathematics
  - Statistics
- Media and Film Studies
  - Media
  - Film
- Modern Languages
  - French
  - German
  - Spanish
- Performing Arts
  - Dance
  - Drama
  - Music
  - Music Technology
  - Performance Studies
- Philosophy and Religious Studies
  - Philosophy
  - Philosophy, Religion and Ethics
- Physical Education
  - Sport
  - Applied Sport
- Physics
  - Physics
  - Electronics
- Psychology
  - Psychology
  - Criminology
- Sociology
  - Sociology
- Technology
  - Graphics
  - Technology (Product Design)
  - Textiles

== Student initiatives ==
=== Committees and representation ===
The Sixth Form College, Colchester has a College Council which is made up of tutor group representatives, generally one per tutor group. The Chair and the Vice-Chair sit on the College Governing Body.

=== College magazine ===
The college produces a magazine, in which all of the articles are written by students.

Storm Radio Logo

=== Student radio ===
The college has run its own radio station (Storm Radio) since 1995. The shows are presented by students from both years and make use of mixed genres of music, while the station itself functions and is treated by the music industry as any other commercial radio station. The station can be received on 999AM/999MW in the college area and across the IT network in most classroom locations. It can also be picked up in certain areas around Colchester Town Centre. It usually broadcasts for 2 and a half hours a day, although for a one-off special in 2002 it broadcast for 24 consecutive hours.

== Ofsted ==
The college was assessed as 'Outstanding' by OFSTED in 2024, including 'outstanding' assessments in all inspection categories.

== Academic results ==
=== A-Levels ===
In 2017, the average A-Level grade was C−, and the progress score was −0.12, which is below the average progress score for schools and colleges in England.

== Notable alumni ==
- Charlie Dobson - athlete
- Jamie Lidell – musician
- Dermot O'Leary – television and radio presenter
- Luke Wright – poet
