= Luke Wright (poet) =

British poet

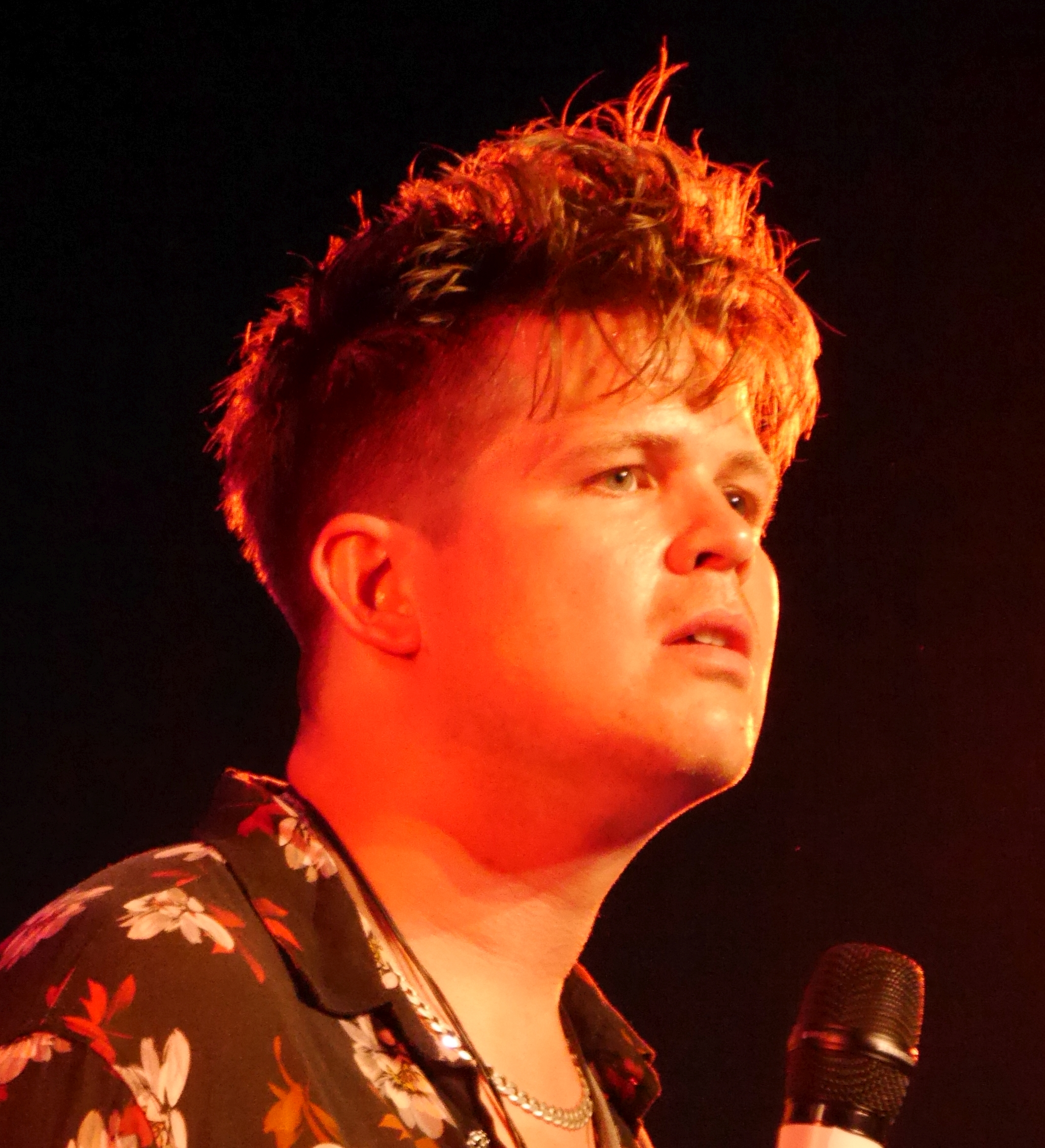
- Luke Wright, Glastonbury Festival, 2019
- Occupation: Poet
- Website: www.lukewright.co.uk

Luke Wright (born 14 January 1982) is a British poet, performer, publisher, curator and broadcaster.

== Life and career ==
Raised in northeast Essex after being adopted as a baby, Wright is an alumnus of the Colchester Sixth Form College. There he began writing and performing poetry at age 17 after seeing Martin Newell and John Cooper Clarke perform.

He formed the poetry collective, Aisle16, with Ross Sutherland in 2000. Aisle16 created three poetry/theatre shows uses video and projections: Powerpoint (2004), Poetry Boyband (2005) and Aisle16's Services To Poetry (2006). Services to Poetry was commissioned by Candida Lycett Green to commemorate the centenary of her father, John Betjeman's, birth; it was made into a film. Aisle16 have continued to develop new ensemble work via their London-based "literary cabaret" night, HOMEWORK. Wright has been involved in a number of these and in 2011, returned to the Edinburgh Fringe with Aisle16 members, Tim Clare and John Osborne, for Aisle16 R Kool.

In 2006, Wright began creating solo shows of his poetry. By 2015, he had created nine. He is the author of several books and pamphlets. Wright tours as a support act for John Cooper Clarke.

Wright curated the Poetry Arena at Latitude Festival from 2006 till 2015. In 2007 Wright also hosted and programmed "Luke Wright's Poetry Party" in The Meadows In Edinburgh over two days in August, it was the Fringe Festival's first dedicated poetry venue in its sixty-year history.

In 2009, Wright set-up Nasty Little Press, an independent publishing house focusing on poets better known for their live performance work.

Wright is adopted, and has written about discovering his birth mother on Facebook.

== Stage shows ==
- Powerpoint, 2004 (with Aisle16)
- Poetry Boyband, 2005 (with Aisle16)
- Poet Laureate, 2006
- Aisle16's Services to Poetry, 2007 (with Aisle16)
- Poet & Man, 2007
- A Poet's Work Is Never Done, 2008
- Who Writes This Crap?, 2008 (with Joel Stickley)
- The Petty Concerns of Luke Wright, 2009
- Luke Wright's Cynical Ballads, 2011
- Aisle16 R Kool, 2011 (with Aisle16)
- Your New Favourite Poet, 2012
- Essex Lion, 2013
- Stay-at-Home Dandy, 2015
- What I Learned From Johnny Bevan, 2015
- The Toll, 2017
- Frankie Vah, 2017
- Luke Wright: Poet Laureate, 2018
- The Remains of Logan Dankworth, 2019
- The Ballad Seller, 2020
- Come! Come On! Meet Me!, 2022
- Luke Wright's Silver Jubilee, 2023-24
- Joy!, 2024-25

== Publications ==
- Live From The Hellfire Club (with Aisle16) - 2005, Egg Box
- Who Writes This Crap? (with Joel Stickley) - 2007, Penguin (also a live show in 2008)
- High Performance - 2009, Nasty Little Press
- The Vile Ascent of Lucien Gore and What The People Did - 2011, Nasty Little Press
- Mondeo Man, 2013, Penned in the Margins
- What I Learned From Johnny Bevan, 2016, Penned in the Margins
- The Toll, 2017, Penned in the Margins
- Frankie Vah, 2018, Penned in the Margins
- After Engine Trouble, 2018, Rough Trade Books
- The Ballad Seller, 2020, Nasty Little Press
- The Remains of Logan Dankworth, 2020, Penned in the Margins
- The Feel-Good Movie of the Year, 2021, Penned in the Margins
- Peak, 2023, Nasty Little Press
- Are Murmurations Worth It?, 2024, Nasty Little Press
- Pub Grub, 2024, Nasty Little Press
- The Driver, 2024, Nasty Little Press
- Later Life Letter, 2026, Fleet
