= The Gilberd School =

Location
- Brinkley Lane; Colchester, Essex, CO4 9PU; England; 51°54′56″N 0°55′03″E

Information
- Type: Academy
- Established: 1912
- Department for Education URN: 137926 Tables
- Ofsted: Reports
- Headteacher: James Mitchell
- Gender: Coeducational
- Age: 11 to 16
- Enrolment: 1,586
- Website: http://www.gilberd.com/

The Gilberd School is a coeducational secondary school with academy status, in Colchester, Essex, England.

== History ==
The school originally opened on 12 July 1912 in buildings on North Hill, Colchester. During the 1930s the school became known as the North East Essex Technical College and School of Art; in 1959 the college was renamed the Gilberd County Technical School after Dr William Gilberd (also known as William Gilbert). The School of Art became the Colchester Institute.

The school was one of three Grammar Schools in Colchester: the Royal Grammar School (boys), Colchester County High School (girls) and the Gilberd School (co-educational).

=== Comprehensive school ===
In September 1980 the school went comprehensive. In 1980, Essex County Council tried to stop the school going comprehensive, and instead be a selective bilateral school, but the Conservative government did not approve this change. The school had become fully comprehensive by 1985. Educational reorganisation made all schools co-educational while also turning the Gilberd School into a comprehensive.

On the morning of Wednesday May 27 1981, Princess Alexandra opened the new school site.

Since 1987 the site has been used as Colchester Sixth Form College, and the school is based in Brinkley Lane in the Highwoods area of the town.

The school converted to academy status on 1 March 2012.

In 2023 the school was found to have potentially structurally unsound buildings due to the use of reinforced autoclaved aerated concrete as a building material.

== Academic results ==
The school's 2016 GCSE results were above the national average, with a Progress 8 score of 0.17. 67% of students achieved grades A*-C in GCSE English and Mathematics.

== Notable former pupils ==
- Alex Gilbey, footballer
- James Raven, historian
- Dave Rowntree, musician, politician, solicitor, composer and animator
- Jamie Donley, footballer
