= History of books =

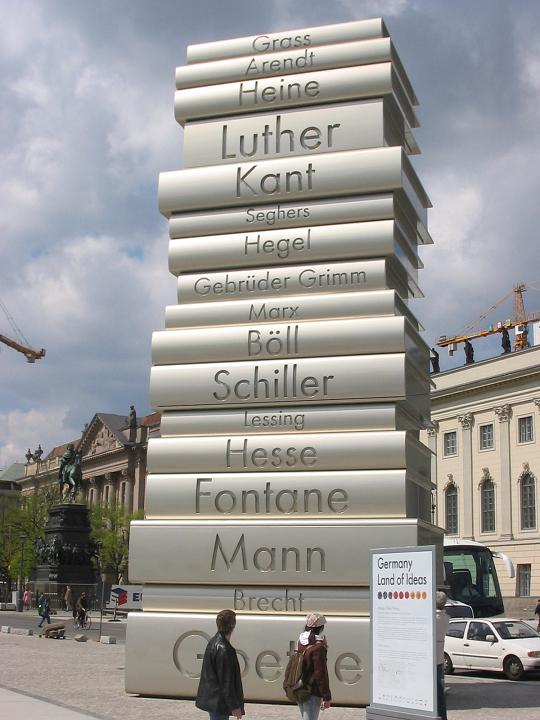
12-metre-high (40 ft) sculpture of a stack of books at the Berlin Walk of Ideas, commemorating the invention of modern book printing

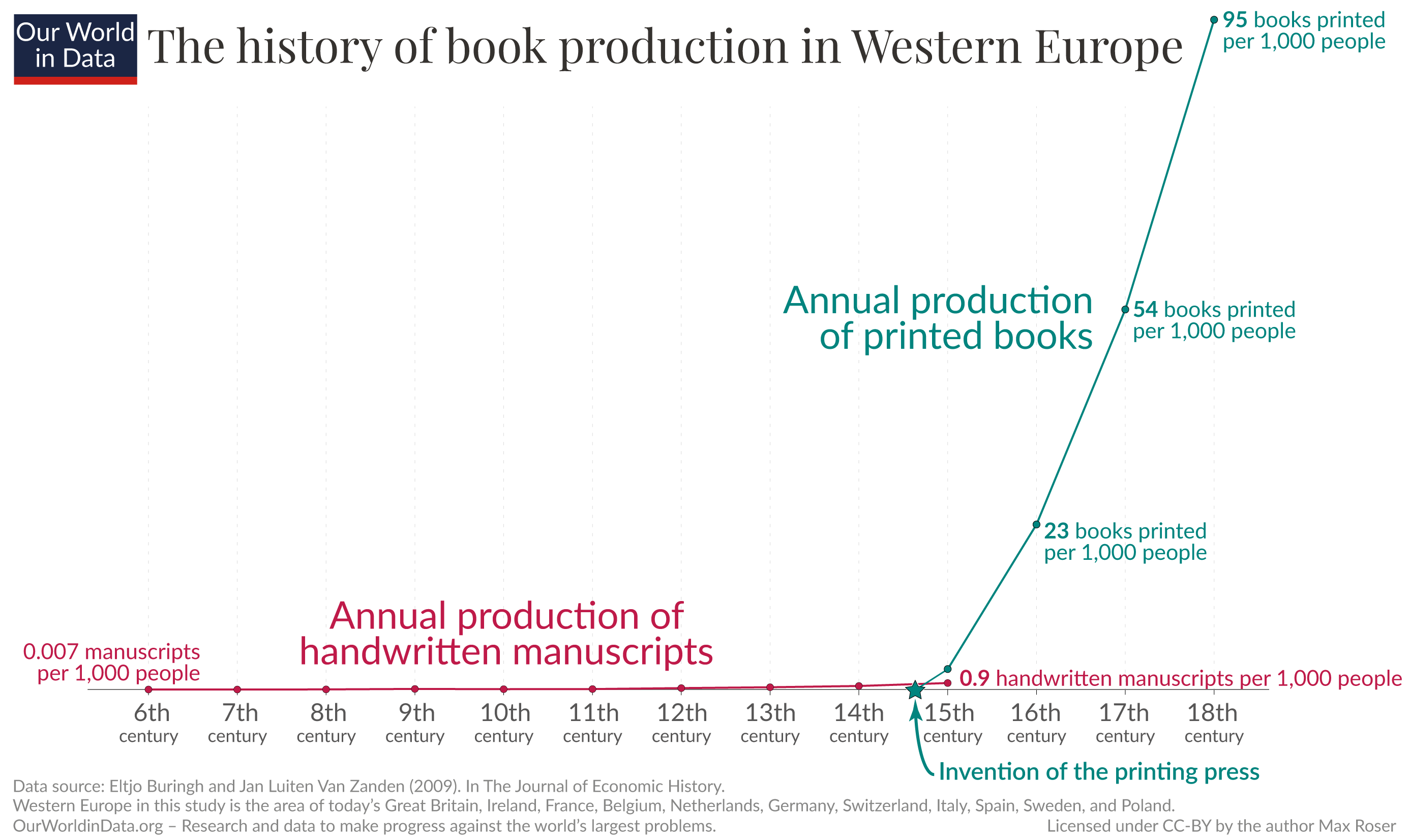
The annual production of handwritten manuscripts and printed books per 1000 people in Western Europe

The history of books begins with the invention of writing, as well as other inventions such as paper and printing; this history continues all the way to the modern-day business of book printing. The earliest knowledge society has on the history of books actually predates what we came to call "books" in today's society, and instead begins with what are called either tablets, scrolls, or sheets of papyrus. The current format of modern novels, with separate sheets fastened together to form a pamphlet rather than a scroll, is called a codex. After this invention, hand-bound, expensive, and elaborate manuscripts began to appear in codex form. This gave way to press-printed volumes and eventually led to the mass-market printed volumes that are prevalent today. Contemporary books may even start to have less of a physical presence with the invention of the e-book. The book has also become more accessible to disabled people with the invention of Braille as well as audiobooks.

The earliest forms of writing began with etching into stone slabs, evolving over time to include palm leaves and papyrus. Parchment and paper later emerged as important substitutes for bookmaking, as they increased durability and accessibility. Ancient books were made from a variety of materials depending on the region's available resources and social practices. For instance, in the Neolithic Middle East, the cuneiform tablet was part of a larger clay-based toolkit used for bureaucracy and control. In contrast, while animal skin was never used to write books in eastern and southern Asia, it became a mainstay for prestige manuscripts in the Middle East, Europe, and the Americas. Similarly, papyrus and even paper were used in different regions at various times, reflecting local resource availability and cultural needs. Across regions like China, the Middle East, Europe, and South Asia, diverse methods of book production evolved. The Middle Ages saw the rise of illuminated manuscripts, intricately blending text and imagery, particularly during the Mughal era in South Asia under the patronage of rulers like Akbar and Shah Jahan. Prior to the invention of the printing press, made famous by the Gutenberg Bible, each text was a unique, handcrafted, valuable article, personalized through the design features incorporated by the scribe, owner, bookbinder, and illustrator.

The invention of the printing press in the 15th century marked a pivotal moment, revolutionizing book production. Innovations like movable type and steam-powered presses accelerated manufacturing processes and contributed to increased literacy rates. Copyright protection also emerged, securing authors' rights and shaping the publishing landscape. The Late Modern Period introduced chapbooks, catering to a wider range of readers, and mechanization of the printing process further enhanced efficiency.

The 19th century witnessed the invention of the typewriter, which became indispensable in the following decades for professional, business and student writing. In the 20th century the advent of computers and desktop publishing transformed document creation and printing. Digital advancements in the 21st century led to the rise of e-books, propelled by the popularity of e-readers and accessibility features. While discussions about the potential decline of physical books have surfaced, print media has proven remarkably resilient, continuing to thrive as a multi-billion dollar industry. Additionally, efforts to make literature more inclusive emerged, with the development of Braille for the visually impaired and the creation of spoken books, providing alternative ways for individuals to access and enjoy literature.

The study of book history became an acknowledged academic discipline in the 1980s. Contributions to the field have come from textual scholarship, codicology, bibliography, philology, palaeography, art history, social history and cultural history. It aims to demonstrate that the book as an object, not just the text contained within it, is a conduit of interaction between readers and words. Analysis of each component part of the book can reveal its purpose, where and how it was kept, who read it, ideological and religious beliefs of the period, and whether readers interacted with the text within. Even a lack of such evidence can leave valuable clues about the nature of a particular book.

== Clay tablets ==
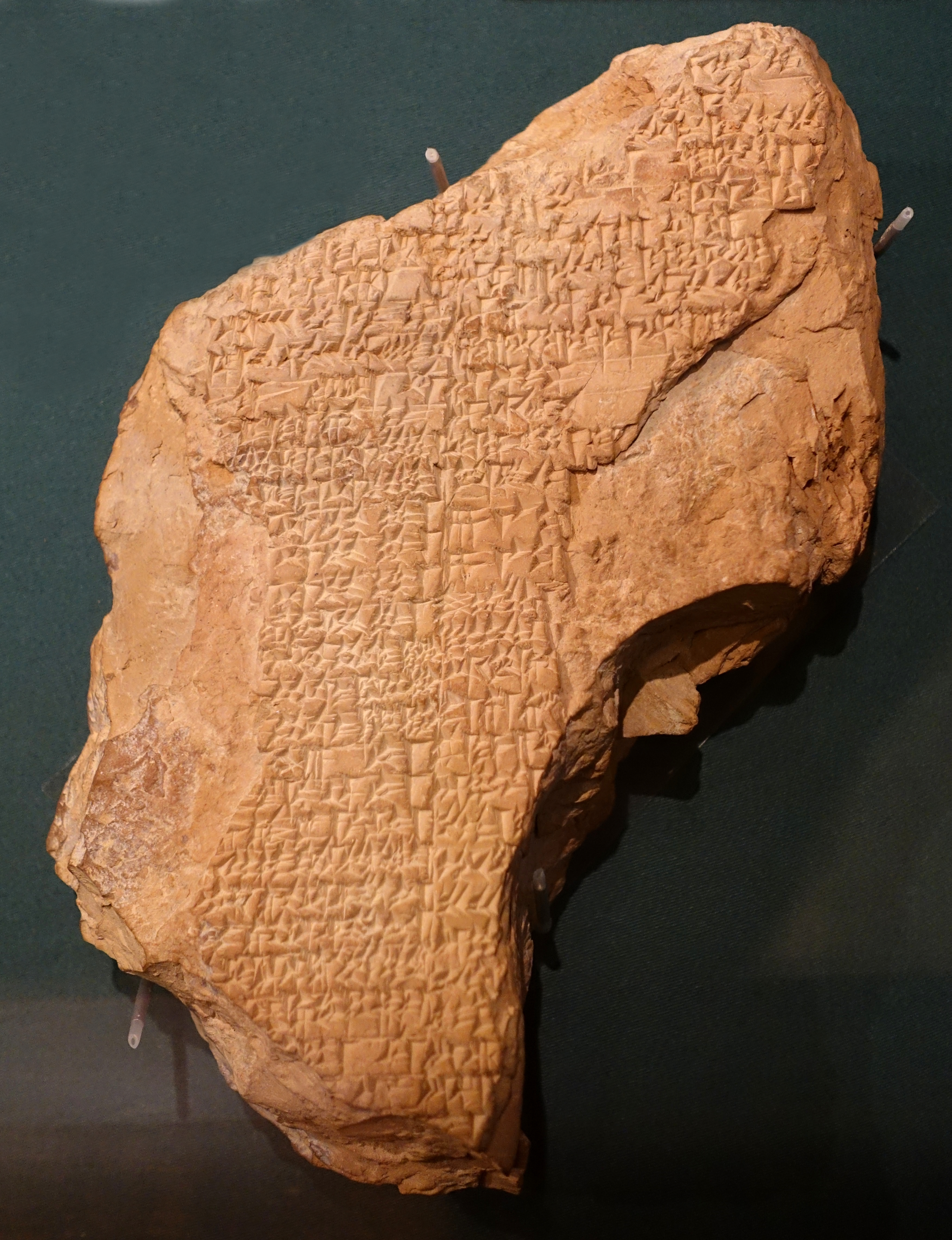
A Sumerian clay tablet, currently housed in the Oriental Institute at the University of Chicago, inscribed with the text of the poem Inanna and Ebih by the priestess Enheduanna, the first author whose name is known

Clay tablets were used in Mesopotamia in the 3rd millennium BCE. The calamus, an instrument with a triangular point, was used to inscribe characters in moist clay. Fire was then used to dry the tablets out. At Nineveh, over 20,000 tablets have been found, dating from the 7th century BCE; this was the archive and library of the kings of Assyria, who had workshops of copyists and conservationists at their disposal. This presupposes a degree of organization of books, consideration given to conservation, classification, etc. Such tablets continued to be used until the 19th century in various parts of the world, including Germany, Chile, Philippines, and the Sahara Desert.

=== Sumerian cuneiform ===
Writing originated as a form of record-keeping in Sumer during the fourth millennium BCE with the invention of cuneiform. Many clay tablets have been discovered that show cuneiform writing used to record legal contracts, create lists of assets, and eventually document Sumerian literature and myths. Archaeologists have identified scribal schools from as early as the second millennium BCE, where students were taught the art of writing. Developed in what is now Iraq, the "cuneiform" script was later named after the Latin word cuneus, meaning wedge-shaped. Scribes often wrote cuneiform on clay tablets, though occasionally they used precious materials such as gold. Cuneiform was written in various languages, such as Sumerian, Akkadian, and Greek, for more than three thousand years, ending only when the Sassanian Empire conquered Babylon and forced the scribes to stop writing. Some of the surviving cuneiform tablets were written by student scribes.

== South Asia ==
Page from a Jain manuscript depicting the birth of Mahavira, c. 1400

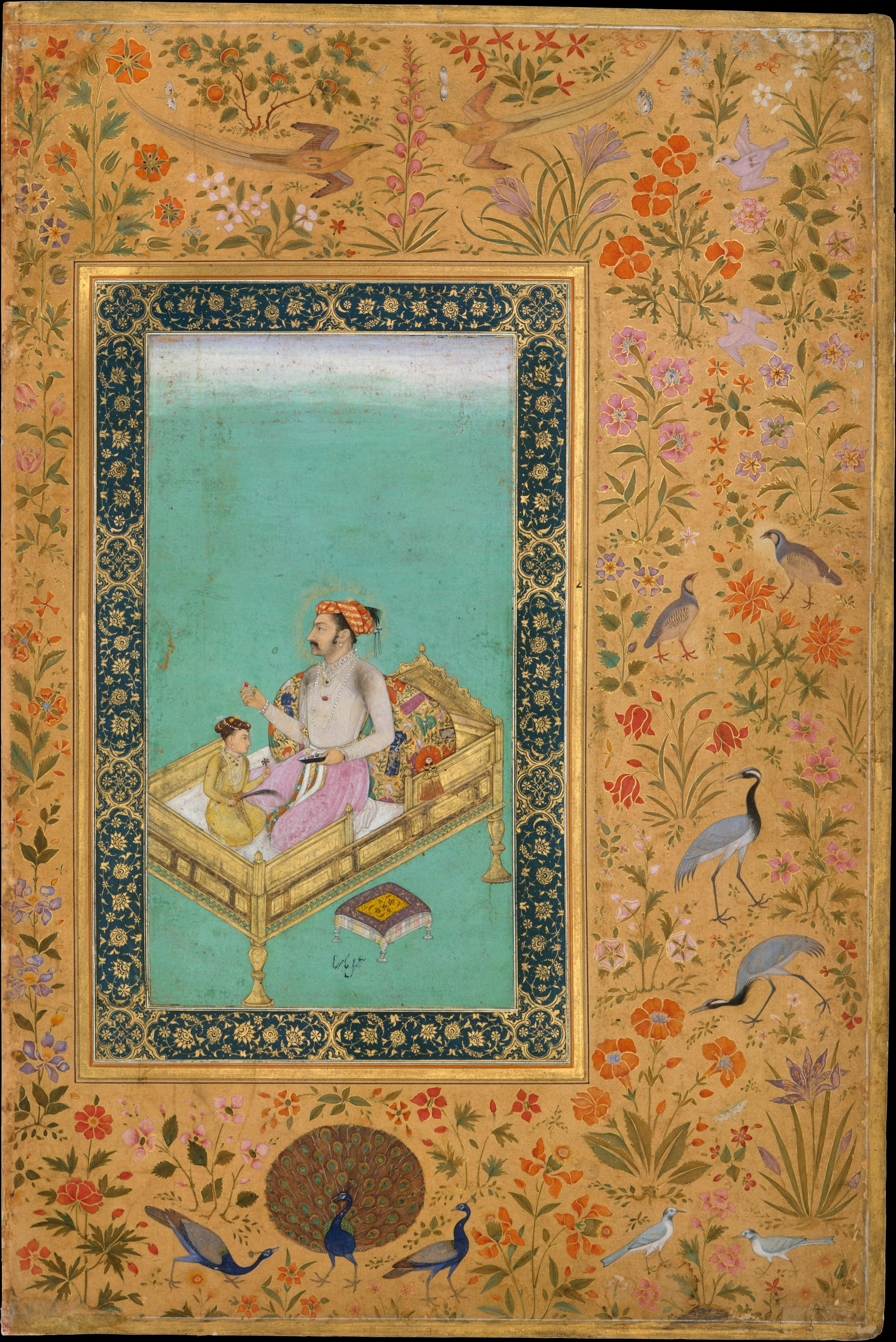
Folio from the Shah Jahan Album, c. 1620, depicting the Mughal Emperor Shah Jahan

=== Early manuscripts ===
In ancient times, stone slabs were used for writing. The oldest surviving books come from the 10th century CE, with the earliest belonging to the Buddhist manuscript tradition. Prior to the adoption of paper, these were written on palm leaves, a naturally abundant resource in the southern part of the subcontinent. The pages were usually three feet wide and two inches tall. The process of preparing the palm leaves consisted of drying, polishing, and treating with starch to form a surface suitable for writing. The pages were bound together by a single piece of string on the shorter edge, and held with the longer edge of the manuscript running alongside the user's chest.

Paper was introduced to the Indian Subcontinent from Egypt and the Arabian Peninsula in the 11th century CE by merchants trading with Gujarat. The first papermaking mills were established in the 15th century CE by artisans arriving from Samarkand. However, palm leaves continued to be used as a substrate for manuscripts in parts of eastern and southern India and Sri Lanka. Paper was commonly used in the Jain manuscript tradition from the 15th century onwards. The elongated proportions of the palm-leaf manuscripts were dropped for thinner forms made possible by paper; however, the pages still used a horizontal orientation. Images took up around one-third of the page, the rest being filled with text.

== East Asia ==
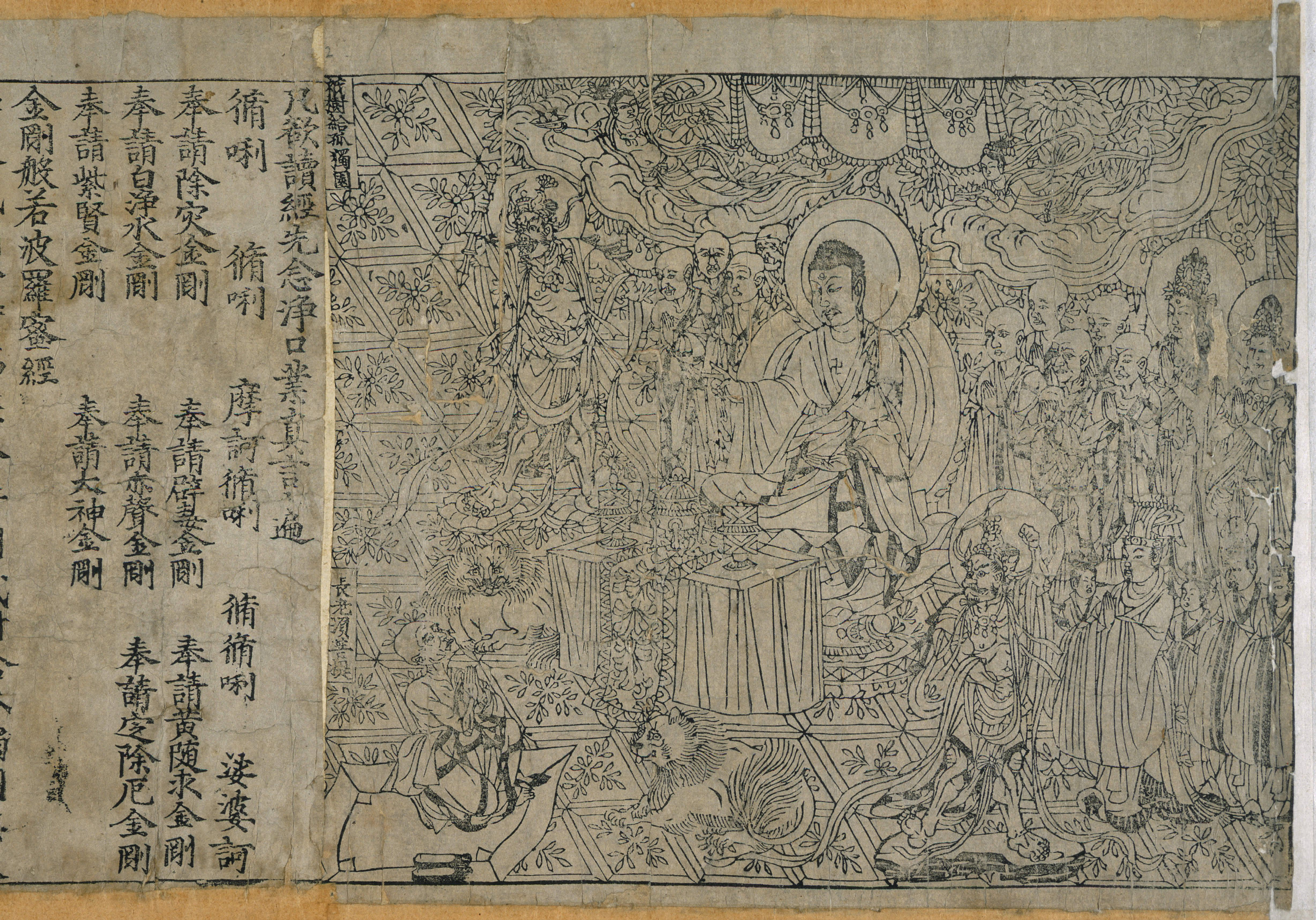
The intricate frontispiece of the Diamond Sutra from Tang dynasty China, i.e. 868 CE, the oldest known dated printed book in the world (British Library)

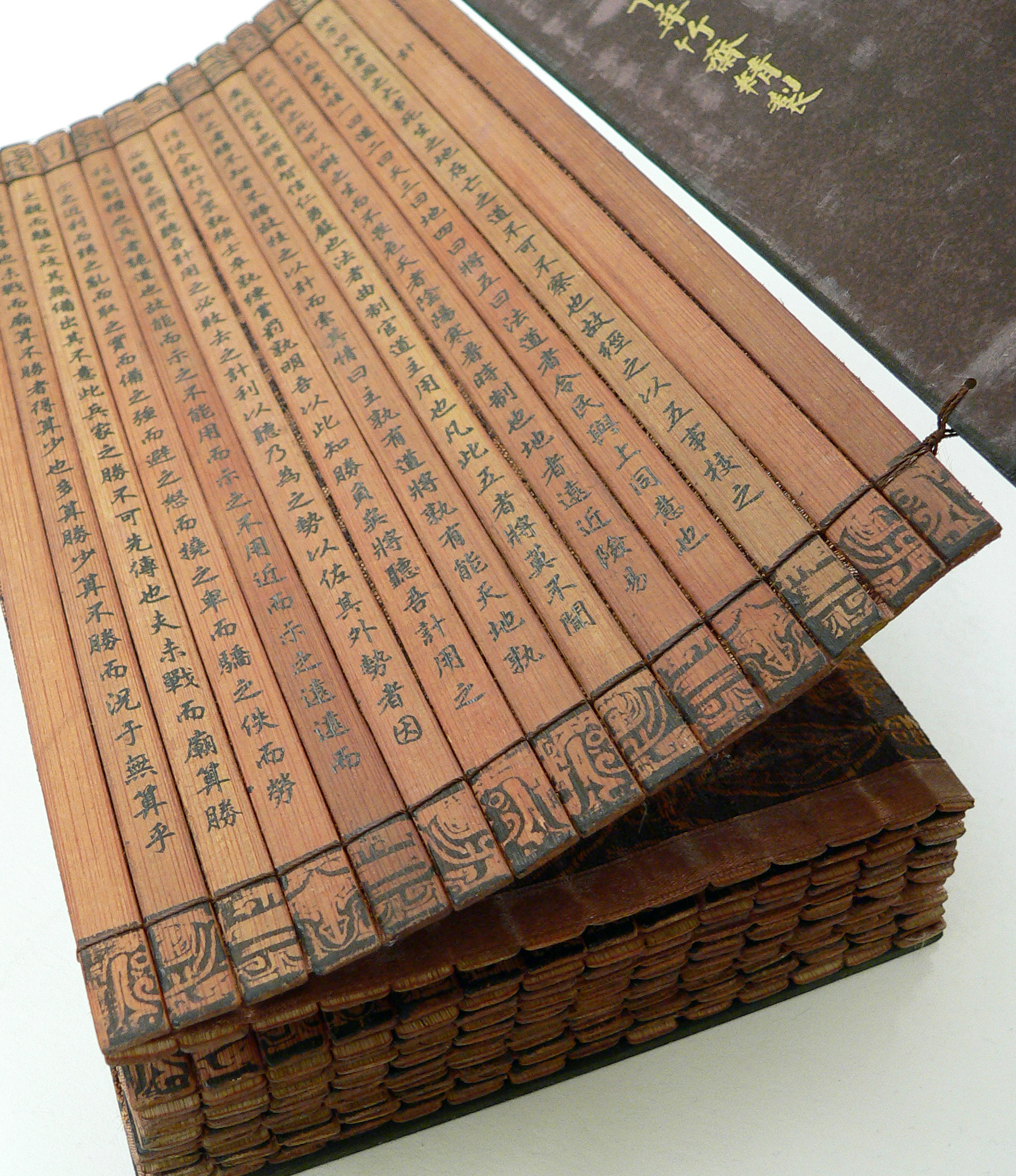
A Chinese bamboo book, The Art of War, commissioned by the Qianlong Emperor in 18th-century China

=== China ===
Before the introduction of books, writing on bone, shells, wood and silk was prevalent in China long before the 2nd century BCE, until paper was invented in China around the 1st century CE. China's first recognizable books called jiance or jiandu, were made of rolls of thin split and dried bamboo bound together with hemp, silk, or leather. The discovery of the process using the bark of the mulberry to create paper is attributed to Cai Lun, but it may be older. Texts were reproduced by woodblock printing; the diffusion of Buddhist texts was a main impetus to large-scale production. The format of the book evolved with intermediate stages of scrolls folded concertina-style, scrolls bound at one edge ("butterfly books"), and so on.

Although there is no exact date known, between 618 and 907 CE —the period of the Tang Dynasty— the first printing of books started in China. The oldest extant printed book is a work of the Diamond Sutra and dates back to 868 CE, during the Tang Dynasty. The Diamond Sutra was printed by method of woodblock printing, a strenuous method in which the text to be printed would be carved into a woodblock's surface, essentially to be used to stamp the words onto the writing surface medium. Woodblock printing was a common process for the reproduction of already handwritten texts during the earliest stages of book printing. This process was incredibly time-consuming.

Because of the meticulous and time-consuming process that woodblock printing was, Bi Sheng, a key contributor to the history of printing, invented the process of Movable type printing (1041–1048 CE). Bi Sheng developed a printing process in which written text could be copied with the use of formed character types, the earliest types being made of ceramic or clay material. The method of movable type printing would later be independently invented and improved by Johannes Gutenberg.

=== Japan ===
A lot of extremely detailed text was produced in early 17th century Japan. For instance, Hitomi Hitsudai spent sixty years taking field notes on 499 types of edible flowers and animals for his book Honchō shokkan (The Culinary Mirror of the Realm). This detailed style of writing was common in the early years when the majority of literate people were of higher classes. Soon afterwards, literacy increased, as hundreds (some say thousands) of schools taught children the vocabulary of geography, history, and individual crafts and callings. The highly detailed style still persisted as it was consistent in many gazetteers, emerging as a social lexicon. In some instances, family almanacs and encyclopedias were put together regionally.

While the highly detailed writing form persisted, a simpler reading style also developed around the 1670s that was written for a popular readership. It used a simpler vernacular language, and was written almost directly for first-time book buyers. These original tales of fiction were popular among common samurai as well as common townspeople. Works went beyond fiction and also depicted certain crafts and manuals specialized for that topic. These more popularized books were written in a newly emerging form of script. Authors had to deal with the idea of the "reading public" for the first time. These authors took into account the different social strata of their audience and had to learn "the common forms of reference that made the words and images of a text intelligible" to the layman.

Authors had reached a new market with their more simplistic writing. After passing this hurdle, they began writing about more than specified crafts and social lexicons. For the first time, writers had the chance to make once private knowledge public, and moved into more regional information guides. Detail-oriented writing still persisted as writing became understood as something that needed to show "quantitative evidence in order to measure continuity against change". The increasing literacy across Japan as well as the proliferation of authors made writing a semi-autonomous system. However, there were still instances of censorship in the late 17th century. Despite the vast depiction of landscape, governmental powers ensured areas that entailed sensitive subjects, such as military households, foreign affairs, Christianity, and other heterodox beliefs, and disturbing current events were kept out of public works. This self-censorship did have drawbacks, as social commentary stayed in the higher social caste where this information was more readily available. Despite these censors, public readings increased across Japan and created new markets that could be shared between the higher elites as well as middlebrow people, albeit with differing subject matter.

=== Mughal era ===
The first Mughal Emperor Babur was not a large patron of the arts, however, he chronicled his endeavors in a biographic manuscript called the Baburnama. Following his exile into the Safavid Empire, in 1540 Babur's successor Humayun brought back artisans of illustrated Persian manuscripts to the Mughal court.

Despite being illiterate himself, the book arts flourished under the patronage of Mughal Emperor Akbar. He established a painting workshop adjacent to the royal library and atelier in Fatehpur Sikri in the late 15th century CE, allowing the production of the book and illustrated manuscript to occur more efficiently. Large scale poster-sized manuscript paintings were used as recitation aids to famous stories and narratives, such as the Hamzanama. Akbar's grandson Shah Jahan established a manuscript decoration tradition that included a strong emphasis on text than his predecessors, as well as margins filled with imagery of flowers and vegetation. Manuscript production had declined from its peak by the time of Shah Jahan's reign and book illustrators and artisans went on to be employed by the regional Rajasthani courts of Bikaner, Bundi and Kota.

During the 17th century CE, the influence of the illustrated book declined. Single sheet artworks became more popular since they were more cost-effective to produce and purchase, and were later assembled into albums with decorative elements added after.

== Wax tablets ==
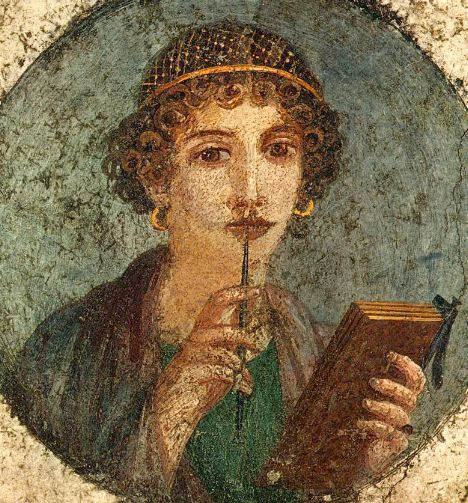
Woman holding wax tablets in the form of the codex. Wall painting from Pompeii, before 79 CE.

Romans used wax-coated wooden tablets or pugillares upon which they could write and erase by using a stylus. One end of the stylus was pointed, and the other was spherical. Usually, these tablets were used for everyday purposes (accounting, notes) and for teaching writing to children, according to the methods discussed by Quintilian in his Institutio Oratoria X Chapter 3. Several of these tablets could be assembled in a form similar to a codex. Also, the etymology of the word codex (block of wood) suggests that it may have developed from wooden wax tablets.

== Papyrus ==
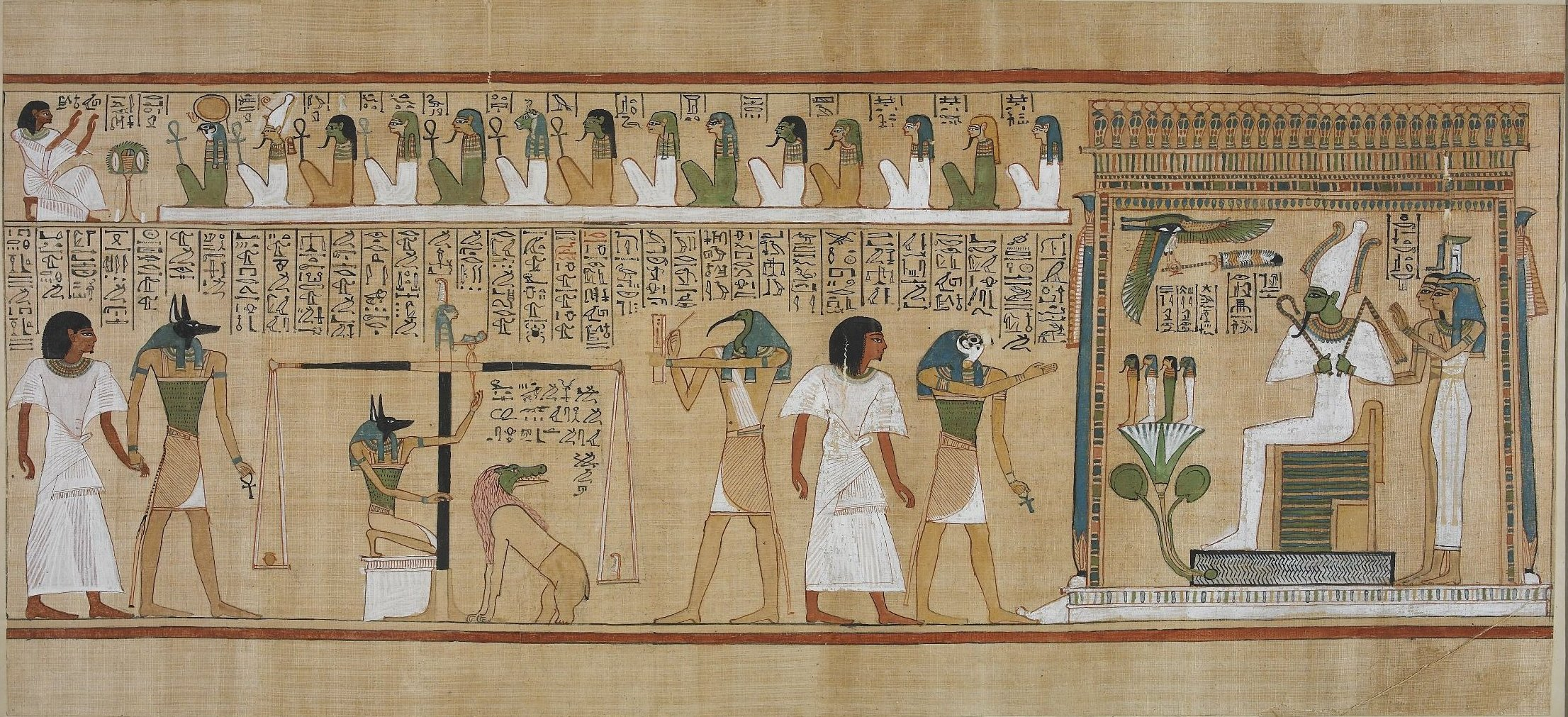
The Book of the Dead of Hunefer, c. 1275 BCE, ink and pigments on papyrus, in the British Museum (London)

After extracting the marrow from the stems of papyrus reed, a series of steps (humidification, pressing, drying, gluing, and cutting) produced media of varying quality, with the best being reserved for sacred writing. In Ancient Egypt, papyrus was used as a medium for writing surfaces, possibly as early as the First Dynasty, although the first evidence comes from the account books of King Neferirkare Kakai of the Fifth Dynasty (about 2400 BCE). A calamus, the stem of a reed sharpened to a point, or bird feathers, were used for writing. The script of Egyptian scribes was called hieratic, or sacerdotal writing; it was not hieroglyphic, but a simplified form better suited to manuscript writing (hieroglyphs usually being engraved or painted). Egyptians exported papyrus to other Mediterranean civilizations including Greece and Rome where it remained in use until parchment was developed.

Papyrus books were in the form of scrolls composed of several sheets pasted together, with some reaching a total length of 10 meters or more. Some books, such as the history of the reign of Ramses III, were over 40 meters long. Books rolled out horizontally; the text occupied one side and was divided into columns. The title was indicated by a label attached to the cylinder containing the scroll. Many papyrus texts have been recovered from tombs, where prayers and sacred texts were deposited (such as the Book of the Dead, from the early 2nd millennium BCE) were deposited.

Papyrus was a common substrate to be used for notarial documents, tax registries, and legal contracts. Scrolls were typically held vertically to be read, and text was written in long columns. Literary texts, however, were traditionally transcribed into the codex form. After the latter half of the 10th century, leftover papyrus in Egypt was often used by bookbinders for making book covers, since paper had replaced papyrus as the dominant substrate for books.

== Pre-Columbian American codices ==
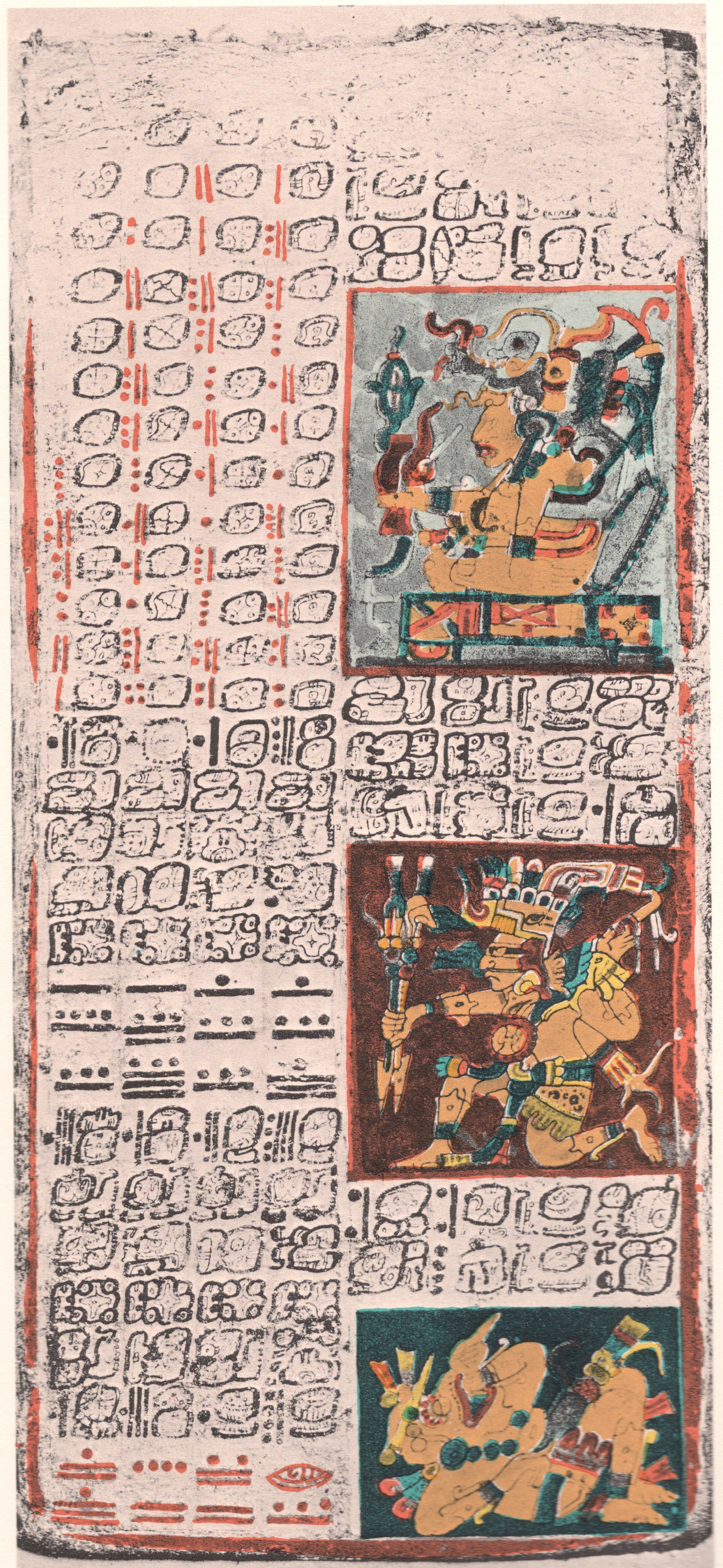
Page 49 of the Dresden Codex

In Mesoamerica, information was recorded on long strips of paper, agave fibers, or animal hides, which were then folded and protected by wooden covers. These were thought to have existed since the time of the Classical Period between the 3rd and 8th centuries, CE. Many of these codices were thought to contain astrological information, religious calendars, knowledge about the gods, genealogies of the rulers, cartographic information, and tribute collection. Many of these codices were stored in temples but were ultimately destroyed by the Spanish colonizers.

Currently, the only completely deciphered pre-Columbian writing system is the Maya script. The Maya, along with several other cultures in Mesoamerica, constructed concertina-style books written on Amate paper. Nearly all Mayan texts were destroyed by the Spanish during colonization on cultural and religious grounds. One of the few surviving examples is the Dresden Codex.

Although only the Maya have been shown to have a writing system capable of conveying any concept that can be conveyed via speech (at about the same level as the modern Japanese writing system), other Mesoamerican cultures had more rudimentary ideographic writing systems which were contained in similar concertina-style books, one such example being the Aztec codices.

=== Florentine Codex ===
There are more than 2,000 illustrations drawn by native artists that represent this era. Bernardino de Sahagun tells the story of the Aztec people's lives and their natural history. The Florentine Codex speaks about the culture religious cosmology and ritual practices, society, economics, and natural history of the Aztec people. The manuscript is arranged in both Nahuatl and in Spanish. The English translation of the complete Nahuatl text of all twelve volumes of the Florentine Codex took ten years. Arthur J.O. Anderson and Charles Dibble had a decade of long work but made it an important contribution to Mesoamerican ethnohistory. Years later, in 1979, the Mexican government published a full-color volume of the Florentine Codex. Now, since 2012, it is available digitally and fully accessible to those interested in Mexican and Aztec History.

The Florentine Codex is a 16th-century ethnographic research study brought about by the Spanish Franciscan friar Bernardino de Sahagun. The codex itself was actually named La Historia Universal de las Cosas de Nueva España. Bernardino de Sahagun worked on this project from 1545 up until his death in 1590. The Florentine Codex consists of twelve books. It is 2500 pages long but divided into twelve books by categories such as; The Gods, Ceremonies, Omens, and other cultural aspects of Aztec people.

== Parchment and paper ==
=== Parchment ===
Parchment progressively replaced papyrus. Legend attributes its invention to Eumenes II, the king of Pergamon, from which comes the name pergamineum, which became parchment. Its production began around the 3rd century BCE. Made using the skins of animals (sheep, cattle, donkey, antelope, etc.), parchment proved to be easier to conserve over time; it was more solid and allowed one to erase text. It was a very expensive medium because of the rarity of the material and the time required to produce a document. Vellum, in particular, is a fine quality parchment, made from calf hide. Exeter Book Riddle 26 describes the process of making parchment through the eyes of an animal. The riddle reads:

Some enemy deprived me of my life

And took away my worldly strength, then wet me, dipped me in water, took me out again, set me in sunshine, where I quickly lost the hairs I had. Later the knife's hard edge cut me with all impurities ground off. Then fingers folded me; the bird's fine raiment traced often over me with useful drops across my brown domain, swallowed the tree-dye mixed up with water, stepped on me again leaving dark tracks. The hero clothed me then with boards to guard me, stretched hide over me,

Decked me with gold…

— The Oxford Illustrated History of the Book

=== Greece and Rome ===
The scroll of papyrus is called volumen in Latin, a word which signifies "circular movement", "roll", "spiral", "whirlpool", "revolution" (similar to the modern English sense of "swirl") and finally "a roll of writing paper, a rolled manuscript, or a book". In the 7th century Isidore of Seville explains the relation between codex, book, and scroll in his Etymologiae (VI.13) as this:

A codex is composed of many books (librorum); a book is of one scroll (voluminis). It is called codex by way of metaphor from the trunks (caudex) of trees or vines, as if it were a wooden stock, because it contains in itself a multitude of books, as it were of branches.

=== Description ===
The scroll is rolled around two vertical wooden axes. This design allows only sequential usage; one is obliged to read the text in the order in which it is written, and it is impossible to place a marker in order to directly access a precise point in the text. It is comparable to modern video cassettes. Moreover, the reader must use both hands to hold on to the vertical wooden rolls and therefore cannot read and write at the same time. The only volumen in common usage today is the Jewish Torah.

=== Book culture ===
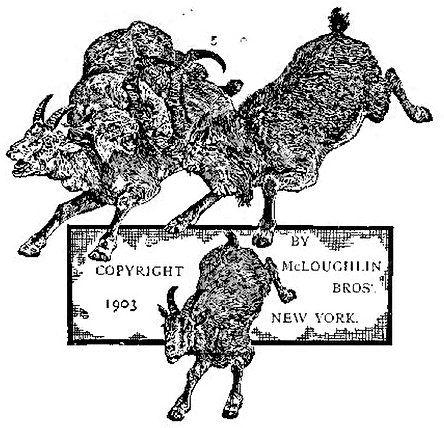
A twentieth-century copyright imprint from McLoughlin Bros that features three rams and the copyright year, 1903

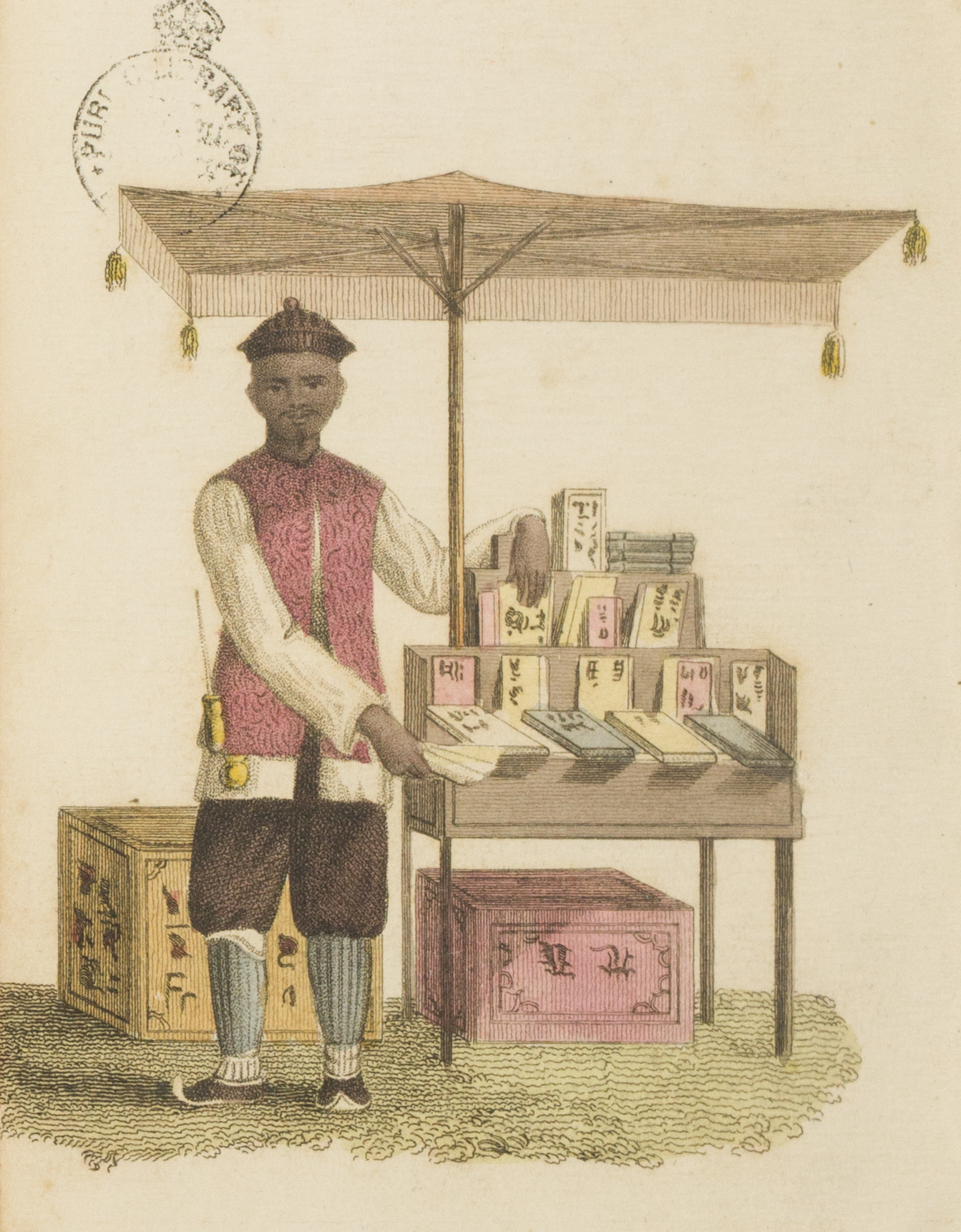
Chinese Bookseller, illustration, c. 1824

The authors of antiquity had no rights concerning their published works; there were neither authors' nor publishing rights. Anyone could have a text recopied, and even alter its contents. Scribes earned money and authors earned mostly glory unless a patron provided cash; a book made its author famous. This followed the traditional concept of the culture: an author stuck to several models, which he imitated and attempted to improve. The status of the author was not regarded as absolutely personal.

From a political and religious point of view, books were censored very early: the works of Protagoras were burned because he was a proponent of agnosticism and argued that one could not know whether or not the gods existed. Generally, cultural conflicts led to important periods of book destruction: in 303, the emperor Diocletian ordered the burning of Christian texts. Some Christians later burned libraries and especially heretical or non-canonical Christian texts. These practices are found throughout human history but have ended in many nations today. A few nations today still greatly censor and even burn books.

But there also exists a less visible but nonetheless effective form of censorship when books are reserved for the elite; the book was not originally a medium for expressive liberty. It may serve to confirm the values of a political system, as during the reign of the emperor Augustus, who skillfully surrounded himself with great authors. This is a good ancient example of the control of the media by political power. However, private and public censorship has continued into the modern era, albeit in various forms.

=== Proliferation and conservation of books in Greece ===
Little information survives concerning books in Ancient Greece. Several vases (6th and 5th centuries BCE) bear images of volumina. There was undoubtedly no extensive trade in books, but there existed several sites devoted to the sale of books.

The spread of books, and attention to their cataloging and conservation, as well as literary criticism developed during the Hellenistic period with the creation of large libraries in response to the desire for knowledge exemplified by Aristotle. These libraries were undoubtedly also built as demonstrations of political prestige:

- The Library at Antioch, a public library of which Euphorion of Chalcis was the director near the end of the 3rd century.
- The Library at Athens, the Ptolemaion, which gained importance following the destruction of the Library at Alexandria; the Library of Pantainos, around 100 CE; the library of Hadrian, in 132 CE.
- The Library at Pergamon, founded by Attalus I; it contained 200,000 volumes which were moved to the Serapeion by Mark Antony and Cleopatra, after the destruction of the Museion. The Serapion was partially destroyed in 391, and the last books disappeared in 641 CE following the Arab conquest.
- The Library at Rhodes, a library that rivaled the Library of Alexandria.
- The Library of Alexandria, a library created by Ptolemy Soter and set up by Demetrius Phalereus (Demetrius of Phaleron). It contained 500,900 volumes (in the Museion section) and 40,000 at the Serapis temple (Serapeion). All books in the luggage of visitors to Egypt were inspected and could be held for copying. The Museion was partially destroyed in 47 BCE.

The libraries had copyist workshops and the general organization of books allowed for the following:

- A catalog of books
- Conservation of an example of each text
- Literary criticisms in order to establish reference texts for the copy (e.g. the Iliad and Odyssey)
- The copy itself, which allowed books to be disseminated
- Translation (the Septuagint Bible, for example)

=== Book production in Rome ===
Book production developed in Rome in the 1st century BC with Latin literature that had been influenced by the Greek. Conservative estimates place the number of potential readers in Imperial Rome at around 100,000 people.

This diffusion primarily concerned circles of literary individuals. Atticus was the editor of his friend Cicero. However, the book business progressively extended itself through the Roman Empire; for example, there were bookstores in Lyon. The spread of the book was aided by the spread of Latin throughout the Western Roman Empire.

Libraries were private or created at the behest of an individual. Julius Caesar, for example, wanted to establish one in Rome, proving that libraries were signs of political prestige.

In the year 377, there were 28 libraries in Rome, and it is known that there were many smaller libraries in other cities. Despite the great distribution of books, scientists do not have a complete picture as to the literary scene in antiquity as thousands of books have been lost through time.

=== Paper ===
Papermaking has traditionally been traced to China about 105 CE, when Cai Lun, an official attached to the Imperial court during the Han dynasty (202 BCE – 220 CE), created a sheet of paper using mulberry and other bast fibres along with fishnets, old rags, and hemp waste.

While paper used for wrapping and padding was used in China since the 2nd century BC, paper used as a writing medium only became widespread by the 3rd century. By the 6th century in China, sheets of paper were beginning to be used for toilet paper as well. During the Tang dynasty (618–907 CE) paper was folded and sewn into square bags to preserve the flavor of tea. The Song dynasty (960–1279) that followed was the first government to issue paper currency.

Paper as a substrate was introduced from China and practiced in Central Asia by the 8th century CE. Rather than the bast fibers used for Chinese papermaking, artisans used rag fibers which could be locally sourced. Under Arab rule, these artisans enhanced their techniques for beating rag fibers and preparing the surface of the paper to be smooth and porous by utilizing starch. By the latter half of the 10th century CE paper had replaced papyrus as the dominant substrate for books in the regions under Islamic rule.

An important development was the mechanization of paper manufacture by medieval papermakers. The introduction of water-powered paper mills, the first certain evidence of which dates to the 11th century in Córdoba, Spain, allowed for a massive expansion of production and replaced the laborious handcraft characteristic of both Chinese and Muslim papermaking. Papermaking centers began to multiply in the late 13th century in Italy, reducing the price of paper to one-sixth of parchment and then falling further.

== Middle Ages ==
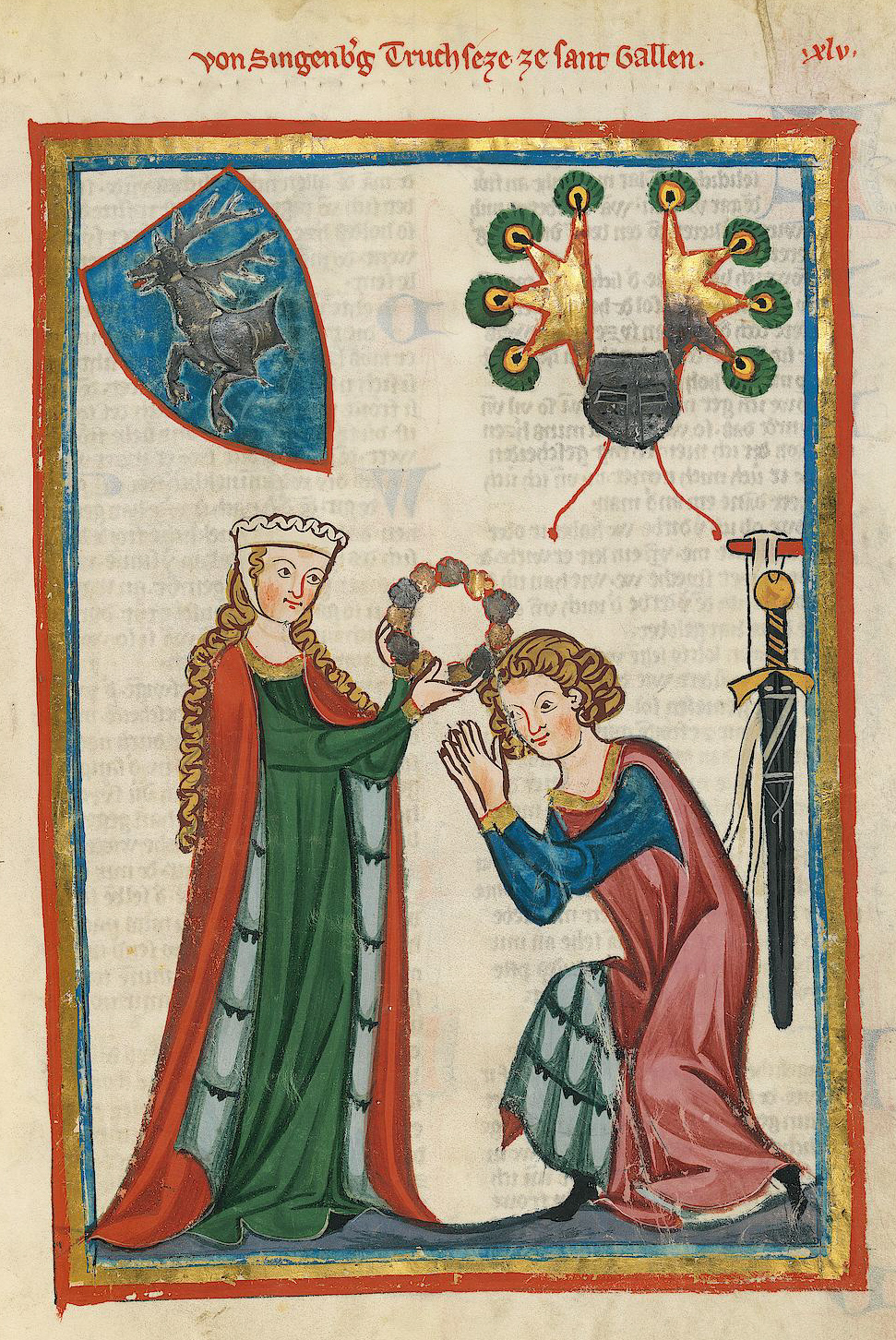
Illustration from the Codex Manesse, a German book from the Middle Ages

By the end of antiquity, between the 2nd and 4th centuries, the scroll was replaced by the codex. The book was no longer a continuous roll, but a collection of sheets attached at the back. It became possible to access a precise point in the text quickly. The codex is equally easy to rest on a table, which permits the reader to take notes while they are reading. The codex form improved with the separation of words, capital letters, and punctuation, which permitted silent reading. Tables of contents and indices facilitated direct access to information. This is still the standard book form, over 1500 years after its appearance. However, it is more likely that its development is attributable to the early Christians who began using it.

Paper would progressively replace parchment. Cheaper to produce, it allowed a greater diffusion of books.

=== Books in monasteries ===
A number of Christian books were destroyed at the order of Diocletian in 304. During the turbulent periods of the invasions, it was the monasteries that conserved religious texts and certain works of classical antiquity for the West. There were also important copying centers in Byzantium.

The role of monasteries in the conservation of books is somewhat ambiguous:

- The purpose of book conservation was not exclusively to preserve ancient culture; it was especially relevant to understanding religious texts with the aid of ancient knowledge. Some works were never recopied, having been judged too dangerous for the monks. Moreover, in need of blank media, the monks sometimes scraped off manuscripts, thereby destroying ancient works. The transmission of knowledge was centered primarily on sacred texts.
- Reading was an important activity in the lives of monks, which can be divided into prayer, intellectual work, and manual labor (in the Benedictine order, for example). It was therefore necessary to make copies of certain works. Accordingly, many monasteries had a scriptorium, where monks copied and decorated manuscripts that had been preserved.

=== Copying and conserving ===
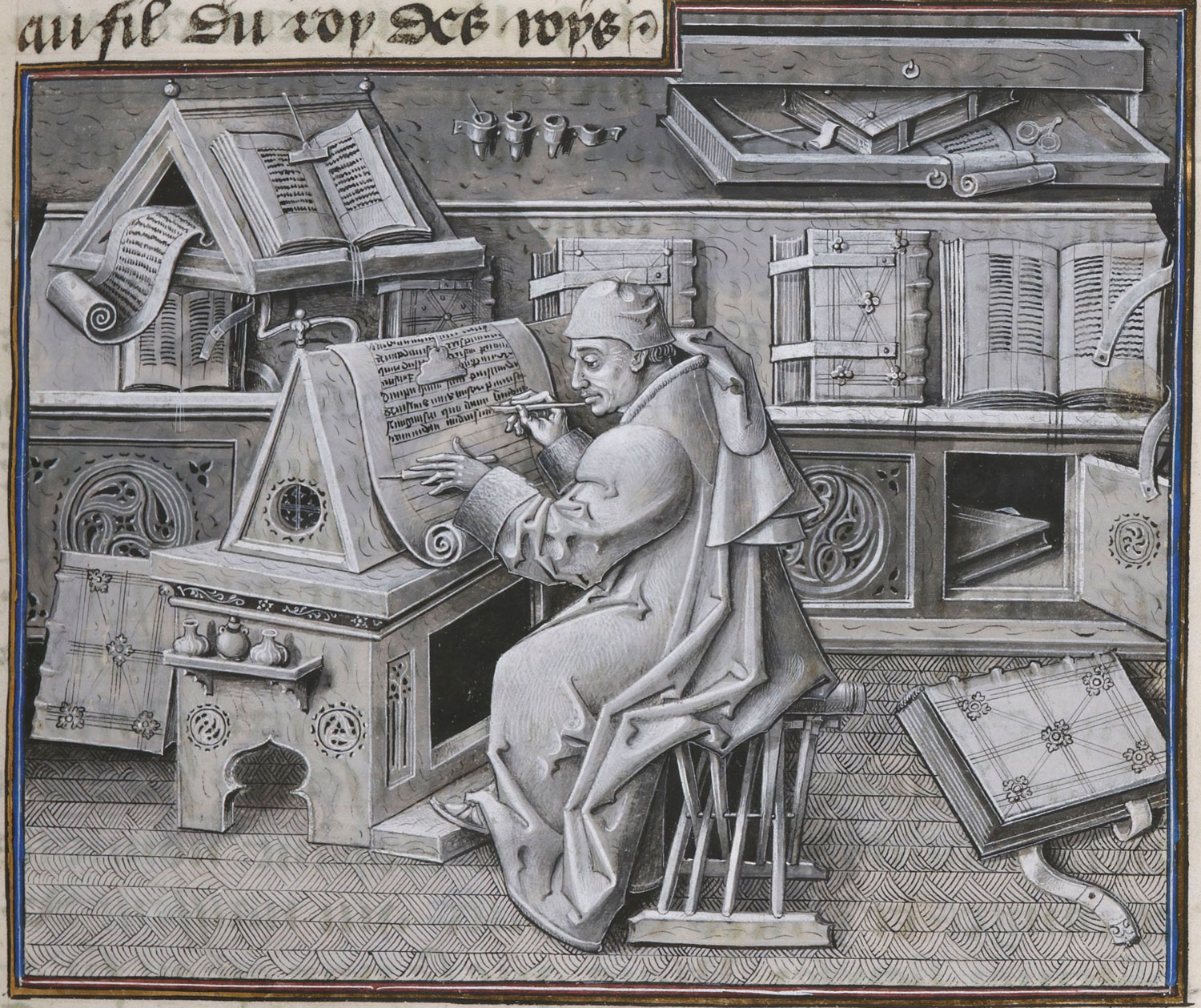
An author portrait of Jean Miélot writing his compilation of the Miracles of Our Lady, one of his many popular works.

Despite this ambiguity, monasteries in the West and the Eastern Empire permitted the conservation of a certain number of secular texts, and several libraries were created: for example, Cassiodorus ('Vivarum' in Calabria, around 550), and Constantine I in Constantinople. Even so, survival of books often depended on political battles and ideologies, which sometimes entailed massive destruction of books or difficulties in production (for example, the distribution of books during the Iconoclasm between 730 and 842). A long list of very old and surviving libraries that now form part of the Vatican Archives can be found in the Catholic Encyclopedia.

To help preserve books and protect them from thieves, librarians would create chained libraries, with books attached to cabinets or desks with metal chains. This eliminated the unauthorized removal of books. One of the earliest chained libraries was in England during the 1500s. Popular culture also has examples of chained libraries, such as in Harry Potter and the Philosopher's Stone by J.K. Rowling.

=== The Scriptorium ===
The scriptorium was the workroom of monk copyists; here, books were copied, decorated, rebound, and conserved. The armarius directed the work and played the role of the librarian.

The role of the copyist was multifaceted: for example, thanks to their work, texts circulated from one monastery to another. Copies also allowed monks to learn texts and to perfect their religious education. The relationship with the book thus defined itself according to an intellectual relationship with God. But if these copies were sometimes made for the monks themselves, there were also copies made on-demand.

The task of copying itself had several phases: the preparation of the manuscript in the form of notebooks once the work was complete, the presentation of pages, the copying itself, revision, correction of errors, decoration, and binding. The book, therefore, required a variety of competencies, which often made a manuscript a collective effort.

=== Transformation from the literary edition in the 12th century ===
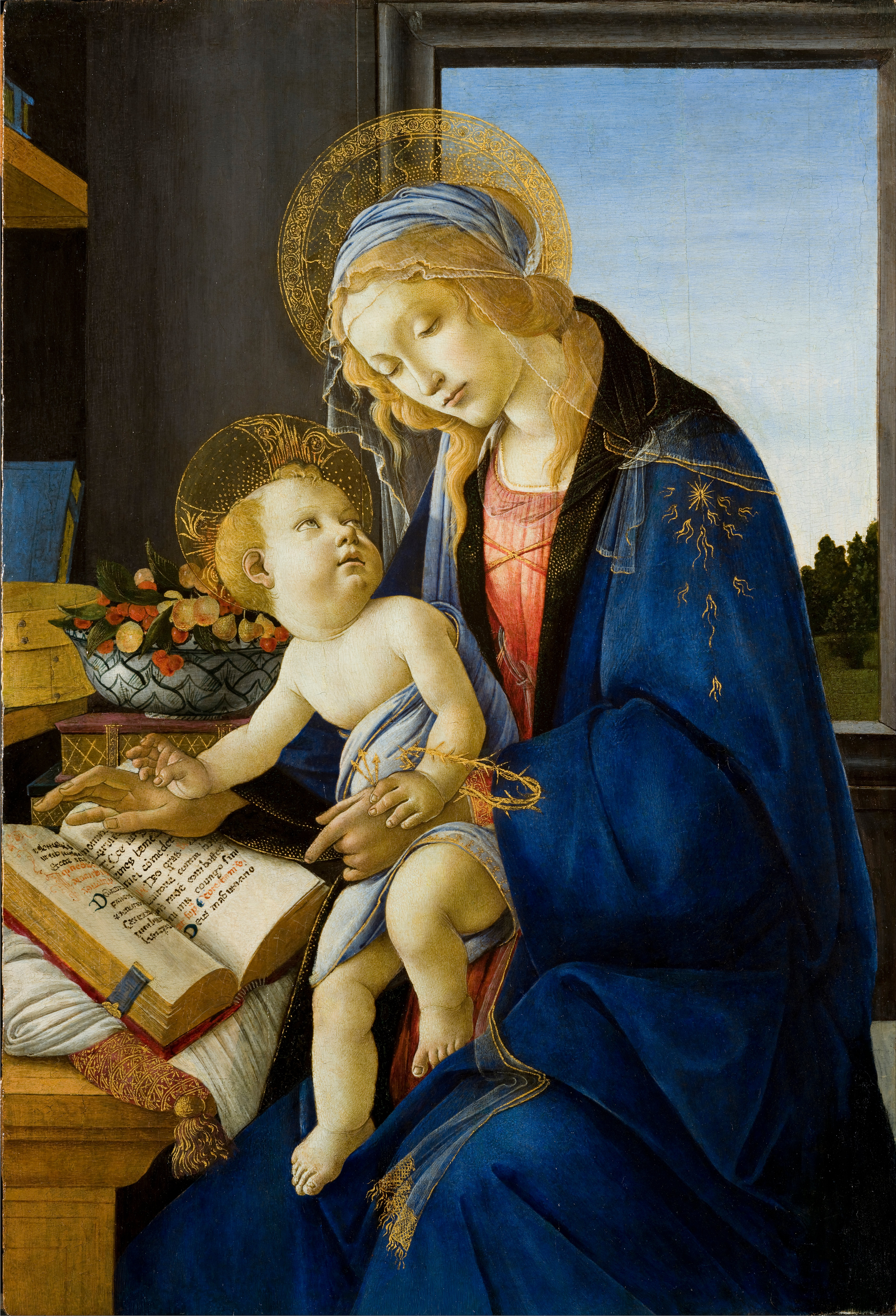
The scene in Botticelli's Madonna of the Book (1480) reflects the presence of books in the houses of richer people in his time.

The revival of cities in Europe would change the conditions of book production and extend its influence, and the monastic period of the book would come to an end. This revival accompanied the intellectual renaissance of the period. The manuscript culture outside of the monastery developed in these university-cities in Europe at this time. It is around the first universities that new structures of production developed: reference manuscripts were used by students and professors for teaching theology and liberal arts. The development of commerce and of the bourgeoisie brought with it a demand for specialized and general texts (law, history, novels, etc.). It is in this period that writing in the common vernacular developed (courtly poetry, novels, etc.). Commercial scriptoria became common, and the profession of bookseller came into being, sometimes dealing internationally.

There is also the creation of royal libraries as in the case of Saint Louis and Charles V. Books were also collected in private libraries, which became more common in the 14th and 15th centuries.

The use of paper diffused through Europe in the 14th century. This material, less expensive than parchment, came from China via the Arabs in Spain in the 11th and 12th centuries. It was used in particular for ordinary copies, while parchment was used for luxury editions.

== The printing press ==
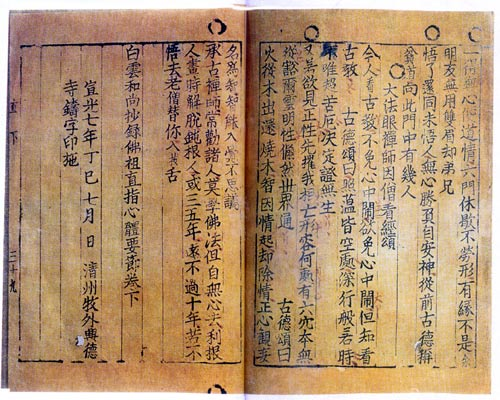
Jikji, Selected Teachings of Buddhist Sages and Seon Masters, the earliest known book printed with movable metal type, 1377. Bibliothèque Nationale de France, Paris.

The invention of the moveable type on the printing press by Johann Fust, Peter Schoffer, and Johannes Gutenberg around 1440 marks the entry of the book into the industrial age. The Western book was no longer a single object, written or reproduced by request. The publication of a book became an enterprise, requiring capital for its realization and a market for its distribution. The cost of each individual book (in a large edition) was lowered enormously, which in turn increased the distribution of books. The book in codex form and printed on paper, as we know it today, dates from the 15th century. Books printed before 1 January 1501, are called incunables. The spreading of book printing all over Europe occurred relatively quickly, but most books were still printed in Latin. The spreading of the concept of printing books in the vernacular was a somewhat slower process.

=== Introduction to printing ===
Movable type in the Arabic script was initially created by European printing presses. In the 1530s, the first Quran had been printed in Venice by Paganino Paganini. The embrace of the printing press by the general public in the Arab and Persian worlds occurred in the 18th century, despite having been introduced in Europe three centuries earlier. The first Arabic printing press was established in Constantinople in 1720 under the reign of Sultan Ahmed III.

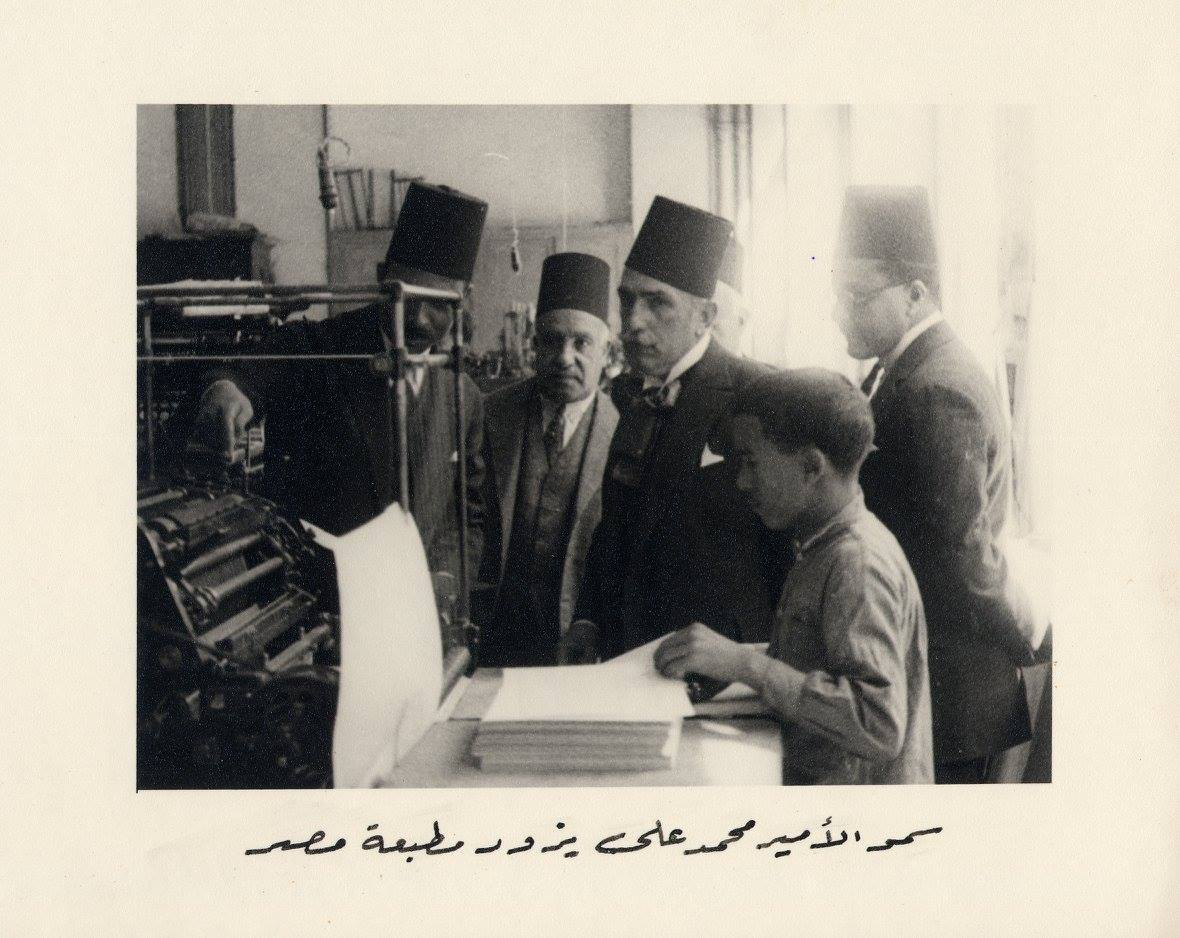
Photograph of a printing press in Egypt, c. 1922

In 1815, Muhammad Ali Pasha sent artisans to Milan to learn the principles of printing in order to set up a press in Egypt. The Bulaq Press was established in 1822 and was headed by Nikula al-Masabiki from Syria, who designed the Arabic typesets. The first published book by the printing press was an Italian–Arabic dictionary.

Lithographic printmaking was introduced as a way of mechanical reproduction of text and image by the 19th century CE, shortly after its invention in the Kingdom of Bavaria. The first Persian book to be printed by lithography was a copy of the Quran, using a printing press imported from Russia to the city of Tabriz. Despite the use of movable typography diminishing between 1852 and 1872, the process of printing from stone lithography flourished in Islamic book production. The advantage of lithography included the medium being well suited to adapt the well established artistic traditions found in traditional Islamic manuscripts. In Persia in the mid-1800s, several "mixed-media" codices were created, employing a hybrid range of both handwritten scribed portions and printed matter.

By the late 1800s movable type increased in popularity again. In Egypt, the majority of the 10,205 books printed from 1822 to 1900 were through letterpress printing. As the arts pertaining to manuscript production such as miniature painting and bookbinding decreased in popularity in the 20th century CE, calligraphy and the art of writing still remain popular.

== Modern era ==
=== Late modern period ===
The Late Modern Period saw a lot of development in the types of books being circulated. Chapbooks – short works on cheap paper – were targeted towards lower-class readers and featured a diverse range of subjects. Everything from myth and fairy tales to practical and medical advice and prayers contributed to a steady demand that helped spread literacy among the lower classes. Literacy was in general on the rise, with a near-universal literacy rate in Western Europe, Australia, and the United States of America by 1890, with the inequality between men and women's literacy starting to equalize by 1900.

The printing press became increasingly mechanized. Early designs for metal and steam-powered printing presses were introduced in the early 19th century by inventors like Friederich Koenig and Charles Stanhope. However, they became widely adopted by the 1830s, particularly by newspapers such as the London Times. Around the same time, a revolution was triggered in paper production by Henry Fourdrinier and Thomas Gilpin, whose new paper-making machines output very wide continuous rolls of paper. The only bottleneck to book production was the time-consuming process of composition. This was eventually solved by Ottmar Mergenthaler and Tolbert Lanston who produced the Linotype and Monotype machines respectively. With these barriers removed book production exploded.

Great strides began in the realm of publishing as authors began to enjoy early forms of copyright protection. The Statute of Anne was passed in 1710, establishing basic rights for the author's intellectual property. This was superseded by the Copyright Act 1814 which transferred sole rights to print work for twenty-eight years after publication. This was extended in 1842 to the author's lifetime plus seven years, or forty two years after first publication.

During the Enlightenment more books began to pour off European presses, creating an early form of information overload for many readers. Nowhere was this more the case than in Enlightenment Scotland, where students were exposed to a wide variety of books during their education. The demands of the British and Foreign Bible Society (founded 1804), the American Bible Society (founded 1816), and other non-denominational publishers for enormously large inexpensive runs of texts led to numerous innovations. The introduction of steam printing presses a little before 1820, closely followed by new steam paper mills, constituted the two most major innovations. Together, they caused book prices to drop and the number of books to increase considerably. Numerous bibliographic features, like the positioning and formulation of titles and subtitles, were also affected by this new production method. New types of documents appeared later in the 19th century: photography, sound recording and film.

=== Contemporary period ===
Typewriters, and eventually computer-based word processors and printers, let people print and put together their own documents. Desktop publishing is common in the 21st century.

Among a series of developments that occurred in the 1990s, the spread of digital multimedia, which encodes texts, images, animations, and sounds in a unique and simple form was notable for the book publishing industry. Hypertext further improved access to information. Finally, the internet lowered production and distribution costs.

=== E-books ===
It is difficult to predict the future of the book in an era of fast-paced technological change. Anxieties about the "death of books" have been expressed throughout the history of the medium, perceived as threatened by competing media such as radio, television, and the Internet. However, these views are generally exaggerated, and "dominated by fetishism, fears about the end of humanism and ideas of techno-fundamentalist progress". The print book medium has proven to be very resilient and adaptable. In the 2020s, print books still considerably outsell e-books in most countries and remain a multi-billion dollar industry.

A good deal of reference material, designed for direct access instead of sequential reading, as for example encyclopedias, exists less and less in the form of books and increasingly on the web. Leisure reading materials are increasingly published in e-reader formats.

Although electronic books, or e-books, had limited success in the early years, and readers were resistant at the outset, the demand for books in this format has grown dramatically, primarily because of the popularity of e-reader devices and as the number of available titles in this format has increased. Since the Amazon Kindle was released in 2007, the e-book has become a digital phenomenon and many theorize that it will take over hardback and paper books in the future. E-books are much more accessible and easier to buy and it is also cheaper to purchase an E-Book rather than its physical counterpart due to paper expenses being deducted. Another important factor in the increasing popularity of the e-reader is its continuous diversification. Many e-readers now support basic operating systems, which facilitate email and other simple functions. The iPad is the most obvious example of this trend, but even mobile phones can host e-reading software.

== Reading for the blind ==
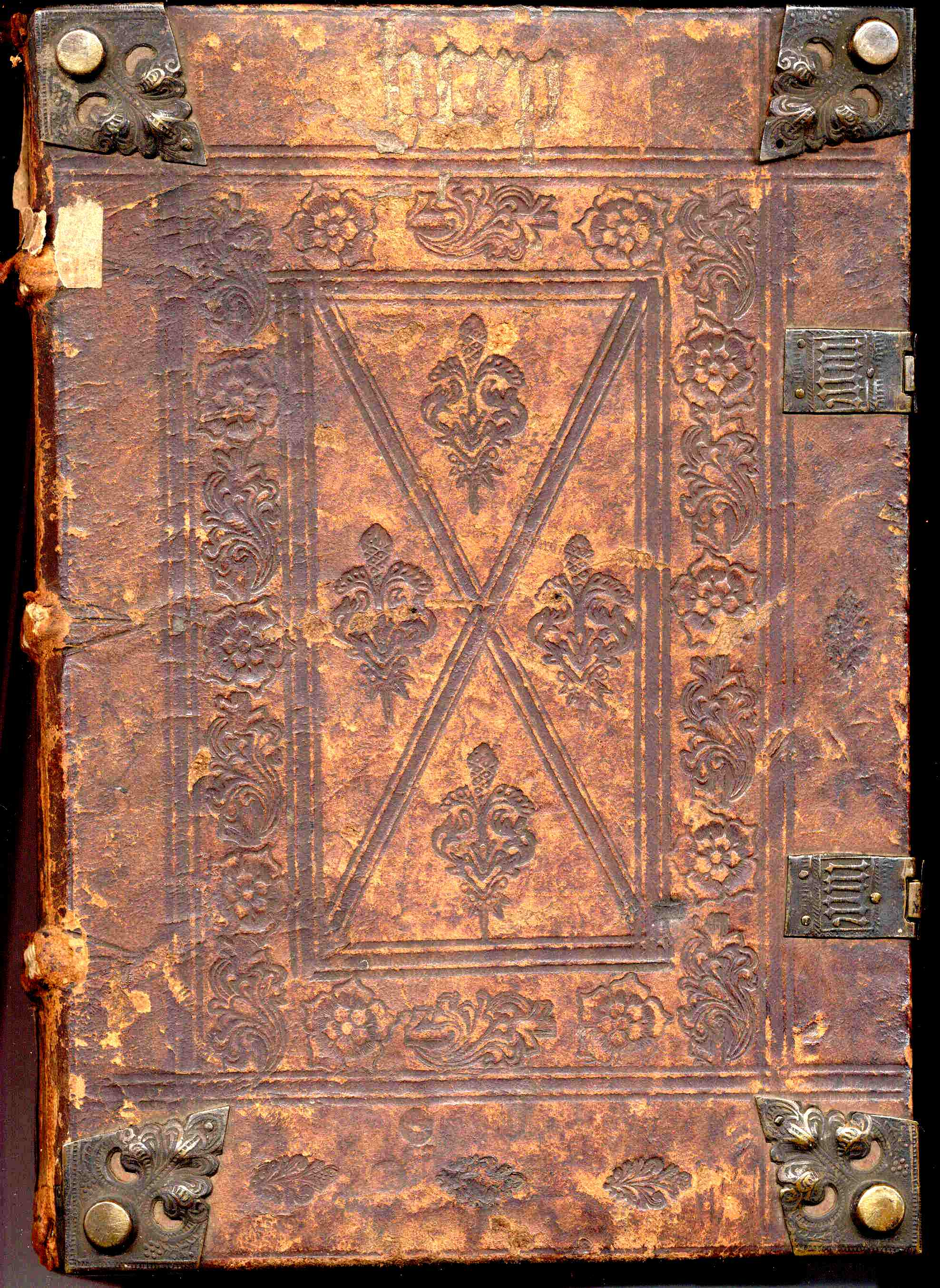
A 15th-century incunable. Notice the blind-tooled cover, corner bosses, and clasps.

Braille is a system of reading and writing through the use of the fingertips. Braille was developed as a system of efficient communication for blind and partially blind alike. The system consists of sixty-three characters and is read left to right. These characters are made with small raised dots in two columns similar to a modern domino piece to represent each letter. Readers can identify characters with two fingers. Reading speed averages one hundred and twenty-five words per minute and can reach two hundred words per minute.

=== Braille ===
Braille was named after its creator Louis Braille in 1824 in France. Braille stabbed himself in the eyes at the age of three with his father's leatherworking tools. Braille spent nine years working on a previous system of communication called night writing by Charles Barbier. Braille published his book "procedure for writing words, music, and plainsong in dots", in 1829. In 1854 France made Braille the "official communication system for blind individuals". Valentin Haüy was the first person to put Braille on paper in the form of a book. In 1932 Braille became accepted and used in English-speaking countries. In 1965 the Nemeth Code of Braille Mathematics and Scientific Notation was created. The code was developed to assign symbols to advanced mathematical notations and operations. The system has remained the same, only minor adjustments have been made to it since its creation.

=== Spoken books ===
The spoken book was originally created in the 1930s to provide the blind and visually impaired with a medium to enjoy books. In 1932, the American Foundation for the Blind created the first recordings of spoken books on vinyl records. In 1935, a British-based foundation, Royal National Institute for the Blind (RNIB), was the first to deliver talking books to the blind on vinyl records. Each record contained about thirty minutes of audio on both sides, and the records were played on a gramophone. Spoken books changed mediums in the 1960s with the transition from vinyl records to cassette tapes. The next progression of spoken books came in the 1980s with the widespread use of compact discs. Compact discs reached more people and made it possible to listen to books in the car. In 1995, the term audiobook became the industry standard. Finally, the internet enabled audiobooks to become more accessible and portable. Audiobooks could now be played in their entirety instead of being split onto multiple disks.

== Academic study ==
The history of the book became an acknowledged academic discipline in the latter half of the 20th century. It was fostered by William Ivins Jr.'s Prints and Visual Communication (1953) and Henri-Jean Martin and Lucien Febvre's L'apparition du livre (The Coming of the Book: The Impact of Printing, 1450–1800) in 1958 as well as Marshall McLuhan's Gutenberg Galaxy: The Making of Typographic Man (1962). Another notable pioneer in the history of the book is Robert Darnton.

In 2025, Rachel Noorda and Corinna Norrick-Rühl published an overview of book and publishing studies methods, including oral history and archival methods (Research Methods in Publishing and Book Studies).

== Gallery ==
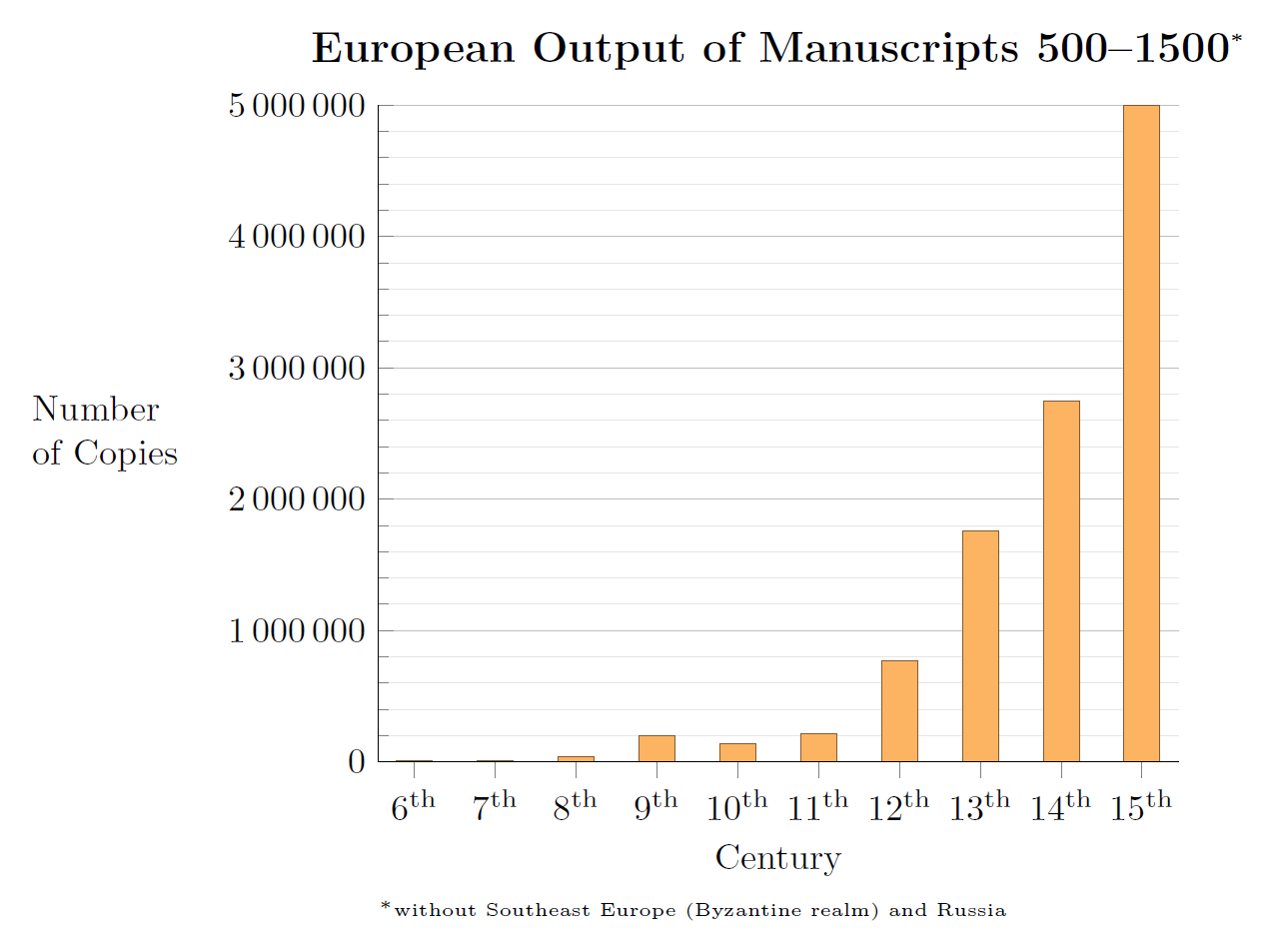
European output of manuscripts 500–1500

European output of printed books c. 1450–1800

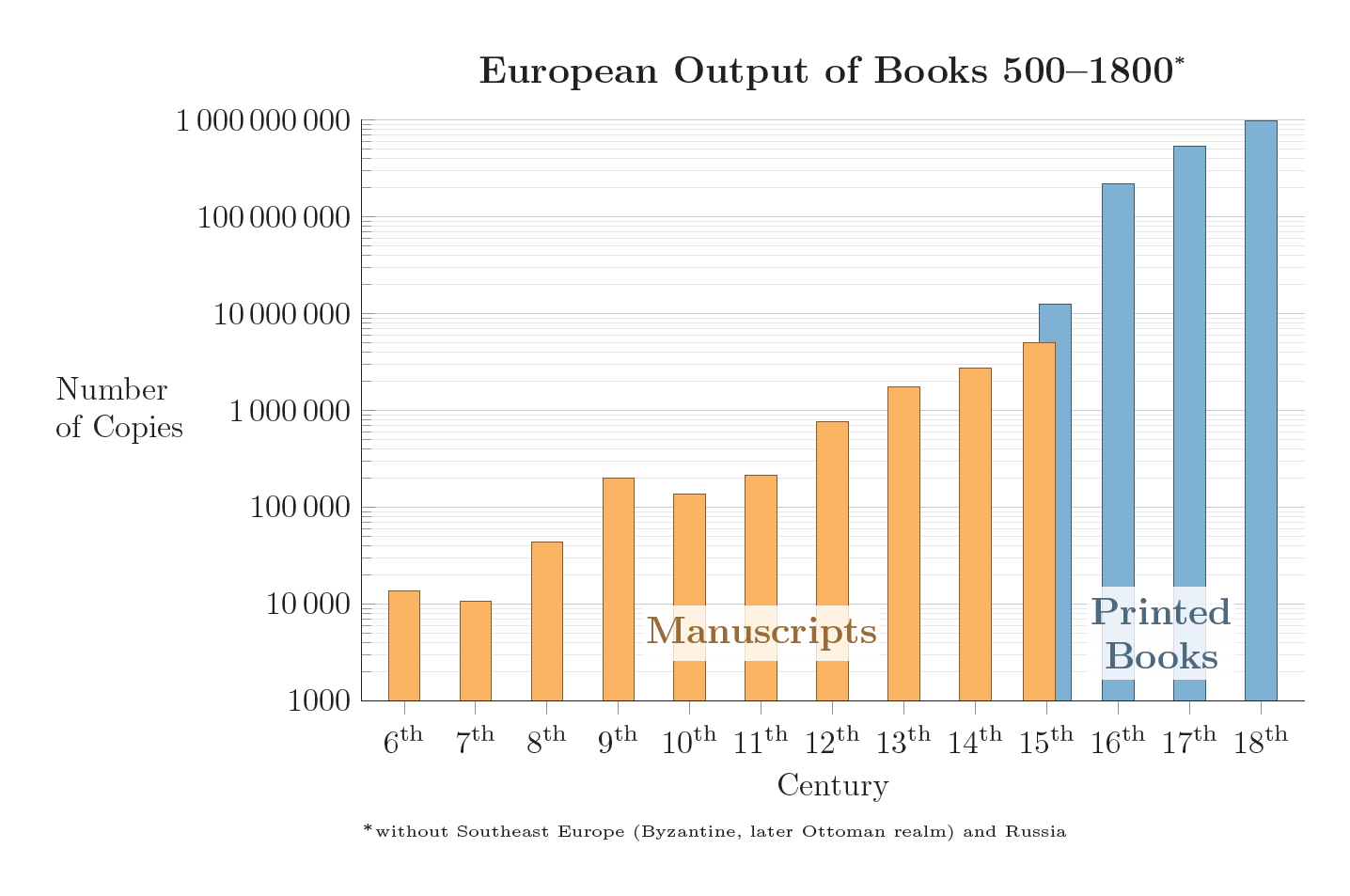
European output of books 500–1800

== See also ==
- Book publishing by country
- Centre for the History of the Book
- History of journalism
- History of mass media
- Outline of books
- Textual scholarship

Specialized databases in book history

- English Short Title Catalogue
- Early American Imprints: Series I Evans, 1639–1800
- Early English Books Online
- Incunabula Short Title Catalogue
- Universal Short Title Catalogue
