= Centre for the History of the Book =

Interdisciplinary centre of text history

Coordinates: 55°56′37″N 3°11′14″W

The Centre for the History of the Book (CHB) was established in 1995 at the University of Edinburgh as an international and interdisciplinary centre for advanced research into all aspects of the material culture of the text - its production, circulation, and reception from manuscript to the electronic text.

Founded in 1995 by Bill Bell and Jonquil Bevan. Bell, who was director for almost two decades, was succeeded by Tom Mole.

== Research ==
The centre was involved in a number of research projects. These include the Edinburgh History of the Book in Scotland, a four-volume publication whose aim is to investigate the history of the production, circulation, and reception of Scottish texts from earliest times to the present. The centre's director, Tom Mole, has edited The Broadview Book History Reader with Michelle Levy of Simon Fraser University. The reader reprints 33 key essays in the field, grouped conceptually and provided with headnotes, explanatory footnotes, an introduction, a chronology, and a glossary of terms.

== Teaching ==
The Centre provided training in Book History methods and approaches at all levels from undergraduate to postdoctoral.

=== Summer School ===
The Centre ran a Summer School course called Book History for Beginners through the University of Edinburgh's summer school programme. This course, taught in four modules on print culture, material texts, publishing history and the future of the book, introduced students to the major debates in book history.

=== Master's Degree ===
The Centre ran an MSc in Book History and Material Culture. The programme comprised two core courses "Cultures of the Book" and "Working with Collections", plus an option course in each semester and the Research Methods course. The dissertation was researched and written over the summer.

=== Doctoral Training ===
The centre received a grant in 2015 from the Scottish Graduate School for the Arts and Humanities to provide training workshops for doctoral students researching topics in the field of book history. These workshops were run in collaboration with Stirling University and the University of Dundee.
