= Tadmor, Ohio =

Human settlement in United States of America

Tadmor is an extinct town in Montgomery County, in the U.S. state of Ohio. Its location, 39°53′45″N 84°9′55″W, is now within the Vandalia city limits.

== History ==
A post office called Tadmer was established in 1867, the name was changed to Tadmor in 1884, and the post office closed in 1917. Besides the post office, Tadmor had a station on the Dayton and Michigan Railroad.
