= Henri-Jean Martin =

French historian (1924–2007)

Henri-Jean Martin (French pronunciation: [ɑ̃ʁi ʒɑ̃ maʁtɛ̃]; 16 January 1924 – 13 January 2007) was a leading authority on the history of the book in Europe, and an expert on the history of writing and printing. He was a leader in efforts to promote libraries in France, and the history of libraries and printing.

Born in Paris, Henri-Jean Martin's initial professional position was that of conservateur in the réserve des imprimés of the Bibliothèque nationale, a position he held from 1947 to 1958. In 1958 he published his famous work, L'Apparition du Livre (The Coming of the Book), which he co-authored with the French historian Lucien Febvre. In 1962 he was named conservateur en chef of the Bibliothèque municipale de Lyon. With master printer Marius Audin he helped create Lyon's Musée de l’Imprimerie. In 1970 he left Lyon for Paris, and a chair of bibliography the history of the book at the École Nationale des Chartes, where he taught until 1993. In 1998 he was awarded the Gutenberg Prize of the International Gutenberg Society and the City of Mainz.

Henri-Jean Martin also taught at the École Nationale Supérieure des Bibliothèques (ENSB, in Paris, today the Ecole Nationale Supérieure des Science de l'Information et des Bibliothèques / ENSSIB in Lyon), and at the École pratique des hautes études where he served thirty years as a directeur des études in the IV° section.

He died in Paris of cancer.

== Selected bibliography ==
The author is Henri-Jean Martin unless indicated otherwise.

- Les métamorphoses du livre. Paris: Albin Michel. c. 2004. ISBN 2-226-14237-1. Series: Itinéraires du savoir.
- Jean-Marc Chatelain; et al. (2000). La naissance du livre moderne (XIVe-XVIIe siècles): mise en page et mise en texte du livre français. Paris: Editions du Cercle de la librairie. ISBN 2-7654-0776-2.
- Livre, pouvoirs et société à Paris au XVIIe siècle, 1598-1701 (3d ed.). Geneva: Droz. 1999. ISBN 2-600-00384-3. (set); (v. 1); (v. 2). preface by Roger Chartier; Series: Titre courant, 1420–5254, 14–15; Note: "Ce livre a d'abord paru en 1969 dans la collection Histoire et civilisation du livre." See also: (1969) (same title and publisher, no ISBN) Series: Histoire et civilisation du livre, 3; Note: "Publications du Centre de recherches d'histoire et de philologie de la IVe section de l'École pratique des hautes études, Paris." Originally presented as the author's thesis, Paris.
- Febvre, Lucien; Henri-Jean Martin (1997). The coming of the book: the impact of printing 1450-1800. London: Verso. ISBN 1-85984-108-2. tr. by David Gerard; ed. by Geoffrey Nowell-Smith and David Wootton; Note: reprint, other reprints by this publisher 1990 & 1984, originally published (London: N.L.B., 1976); Translation of L'apparition du livre.
- The French book: religion, absolutism, and readership, 1585-1715. Baltimore: Johns Hopkins University Press. 1996. ISBN 0-8018-5179-3. Series: Johns Hopkins symposia in comparative history, 22nd.
- The history and power of writing. Chicago: University of Chicago Press. 1994. ISBN 0-226-50835-8. tr. by Lydia G. Cochrane.
- Print, power, and people in 17th-century France. Metuchen, N.J.: Scarecrow Press. 1993. ISBN 0-8108-2477-9. tr. by David Gerard; Note: Translation of Livre, pouvoirs et société à Paris au 17e siècle. Originally presented as the author's thesis, Paris.
- with Roger Chartier and Jean-Pierre Vivet (1989). Histoire de l'édition française. [Paris]: Fayard-Cercle de la Librairie. ISBN 2-213-02399-9. 4 volumes.
- with Bruno Delmas (1988). Histoire et pouvoirs de l'écrit. Paris: Librairie académique Perrin. ISBN 2-262-00616-4. Series: Histoire et décadence, ISSN 0291-3852; preface by Pierre Chaunu.
- Le livre français sous l'Ancien Régime. Paris: Promodis/Editions du Cercle de la Librairie. c. 1987. ISBN 2-903181-57-8. Series: Histoire du livre.
- Pour une histoire du livre: XVe-XVIIIe siècle: cinq conférences. Naples: Bibliopolis. c. 1987. Series: Lezioni della Scuola di studi superiori in Napoli, 8.
- with Roger Chartier and Jean-Pierre Vivet (1983). Histoire de l'édition française. Paris: Bibliothèque Nationale. ISBN 2-903181-06-3. 4 volumes.
- Febvre, Lucien; Henri-Jean Martin (1976). The coming of the book: the impact of printing 1450-1800. N.L.B.: London. ISBN 0-902308-17-3. tr. by David Gerard; ed. by Geoffrey Nowell-Smith and David Wootton; Series: Foundations of history library; Note: Translation of L'apparition du livre
- Febvre, Lucien; with Henri-Jean Martin (1971). L'apparition du livre [par] Lucien Febvre et Henri Jean Martin. Avec le concours de Anne Basanoff [et al.] Paris: Albin Michel. Series: L'évolution de l'humanité no. 30; Note: Previously published as v.49 of the Bibliothèque de synthèse historique "L'evolution de l'humanite".
- Le Livre et la civilisation écrite. Paris: École nationale supérieure de bibliothécaires. 1968.
- Histoire du livre. Paris: Bibliothèque Nationale. 1964.

== See also ==
- Historiography
- List of historians by name
