= Naomi Tadmor =

British historian

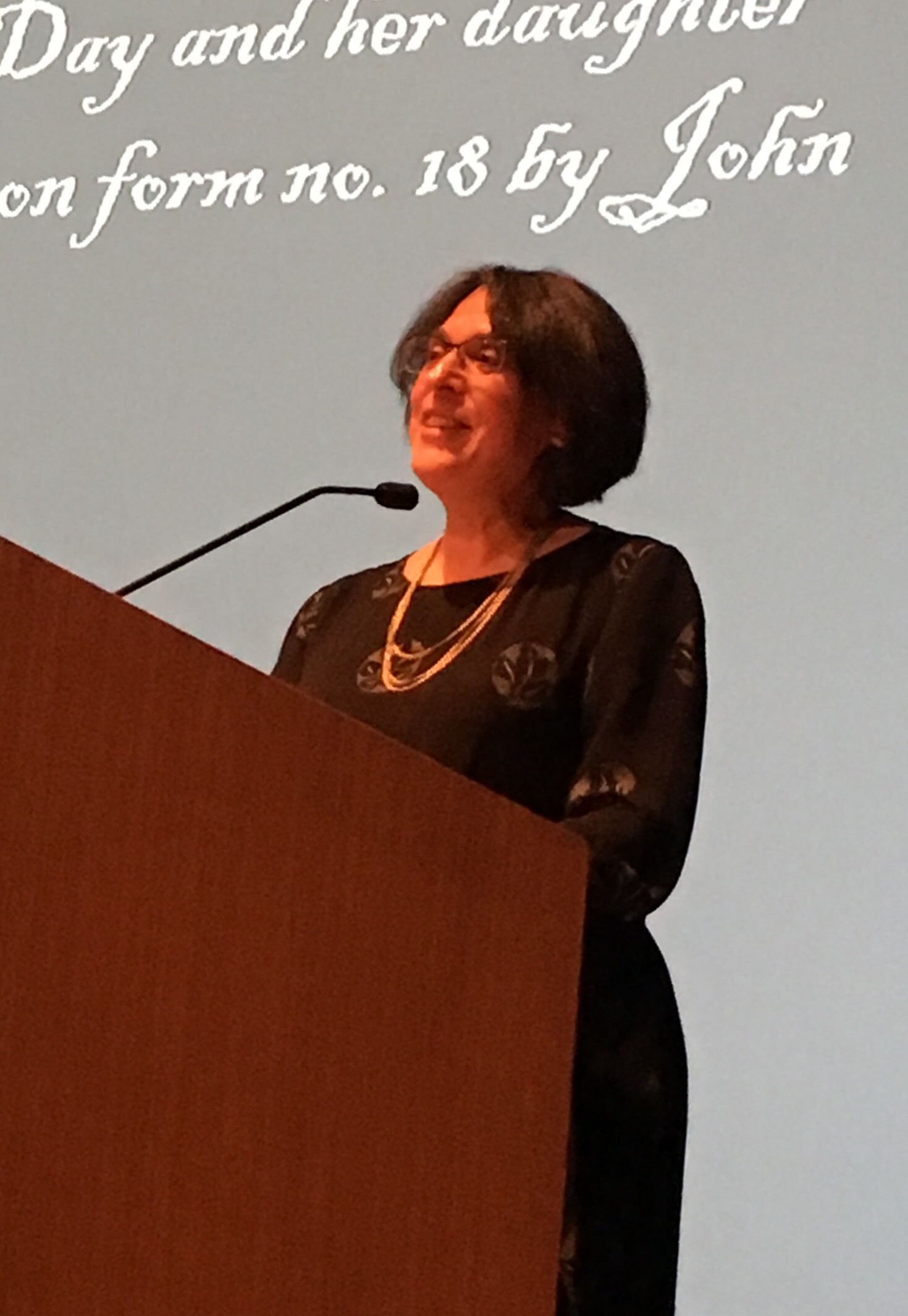
Naomi Tadmor, 2018

Naomi Tadmor is professor of history, Lancaster University with interests in British social and cultural history and modern Jewish history.

She is fellow of the Royal Historical Society and served on its council (2012-2016). In 2019 she was elected chair of the international Social History Society to serve until 2022. In 2022 she was re-elected, and in 2025 she was elected Honorary Vice-President of the Social History Society.

== Books ==
- 2025: The settlement of the poor in England c.1660-1780: law, society, and state formation.
- 2010: The social universe of the English Bible: scripture, society, and culture in early modern England, ISBN 9780521769716.
  Influence of English translations of the Bible onto the early modern English society and culture.
- 2007: The Practice and Representation of Reading in England. (co-edited with J. Raven & H. Small).
- 2001: Family and friends in eighteenth-century England: household, kinship, and patronage.
