= Lucien Febvre =

French historian (1878–1956)

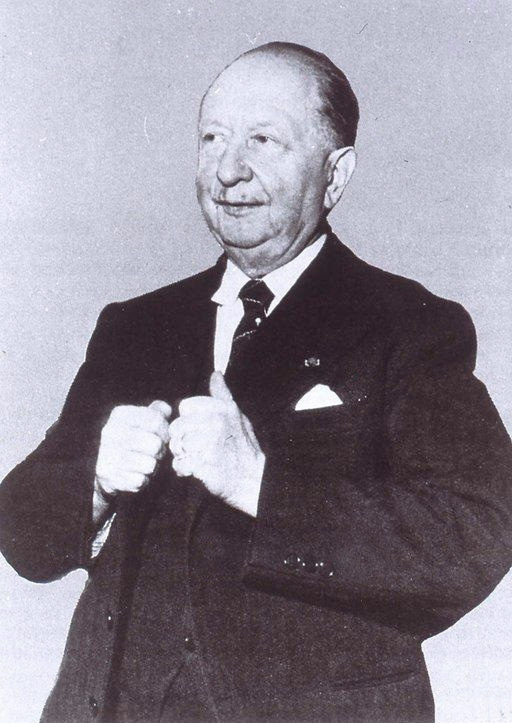
- Lucien Febvre
- Born: 22 July 1878; Nancy, Meurthe-et-Moselle, France
- Died: 11 September 1956 (aged 78); Saint-Amour, France
- Education: École normale supérieure
- Occupation: Historian
- Known for: Establishing Annales School
- Children: 3

Lucien Paul Victor Febvre (/ˈfɛvrə/ FEV-rə; French: [lysjɛ̃ pɔl viktɔʁ fɛvʁ]; 22 July 1878 – 11 September 1956) was a French historian best known for the role he played in establishing the Annales School of history. He was the initial editor of the Encyclopédie française together with Anatole de Monzie.

== Biography ==
Lucien Febvre was born and brought up in Nancy, in northeastern France. His father was a philologist, who introduced Febvre to the study of ancient texts and languages, which significantly influenced Febvre's way of thinking. At the age of twenty, Febvre went to Paris to enroll in the École Normale Supérieure. Between 1899 and 1902, he concentrated on studying history and geography. After his graduation from college, Febvre taught at a provincial lycée, where he worked on his thesis on Philip II of Spain and the Franche-Comté. After the outbreak of World War I in 1914, Febvre was forced to leave his teaching post to join the army, where he served for four years. Febvre took up a position at the University of Strasbourg in 1919 when the province was returned to France. While there, Febvre became acquainted with Marc Bloch, who shared Febvre's philosophical and political approach, which brought the two men together.

The time Febvre spent in Paris played an enormous role in reshaping his outlook on the world. Prevalent approaches to art, philosophy and modern ways of thinking strongly influenced Febvre. He embraced 20th century modernism to the extent that he later claimed to have become "untuned" from the old world and the old ways of thinking.

In his approach to history, Febvre contextualized events against the geography, psychology and culture of the times about which he wrote. History as a mere collection of historical facts no longer held any interest for Febvre.

== Early work ==
Febvre's first thesis on Philip the Second and the Franche-Comté, published in 1911, showed the strength of this approach. In this work, Febvre tried to demonstrate the context that shows events in their true light. Febvre reconstructed the life of villagers and town dwellers in a small traditional province in France by contextualizing historical events in terms of the geography and environment of the times. By describing Franche-Comté's rivers, salt mines, vineyards and other surroundings, Febvre created an accurate and true-to-life portrayal of the atmosphere and outlook of the time. With this approach, Febvre was also able to reveal a negative influence that the French Government of the time played in the life of this province. This approach to history is known as histoire totale, or histoire tout court. Later, Febvre's work would be a paradigm for the "Annales School" and would become a new way of historical thinking.

Another influential work of Febvre dealt with Protestantism. Published in the Revue Historique in 1929, "Une question mal posée" attempted to study popular religion by trying to observe and quantify human behavior. Through an enormous amount of research, Febvre collected information from various monasteries and chapels to study the influence of new wave philosophy in religion and the clergy's approach to understanding and translating their views to lay people. Through this work, Febvre became very involved in the field of ethnology, a field of study that quantifies human behavior. Some critics consider this work to be heavily influenced by Febvre's own views of the surrounding world.

As time went by, Febvre grew increasingly suspicious of theology. He refused to see people as bound by forces beyond their control. He came to the view that religion and old ways of thinking were impractical, maybe even dangerous, in modern times. "In the general confusion of our time," Febvre wrote, "old ideas refuse to die and still find acceptance with the mass of the population." He became convinced that changing religious views and attitudes is as difficult as trying to influence the outcome of any sort of political or social upheavals. He believed that people needed to be educated in order to avoid the dangers of the old ways of thinking.

== Annales ==
In 1929, Lucien Febvre, along with his colleague and close friend Marc Bloch, established a scholarly journal, Annales d'histoire économique et sociale (commonly known as the Annales), from which the name of their distinctive style of history was taken. The journal followed Febvre's approach to describing history. Its approach was to educate the world about the dangers of old-world thinking to avoid possible future economic and political disasters. Its purpose was to influence academic circles to "study ... the present so as to reach a profounder understanding of the past." This journal was like no other scholarly publication at that time.

The Annales was met with a very favorable critical reception and was very successful in its early years. It was in such demand that it was able to increase the frequency of its publications in 1932. However, in 1938 the journal appeared to be running its course and the publishers ceased their support.

== Later life ==
In 1933 Febvre was appointed to a chair at the Collège de France. He published vigorously throughout the 1930s and early 40s, although World War II interrupted his work (following the Fall of France, parts of the country were occupied by Germany).

In accordance with the Nazi regime, French editorial boards were to be stripped of Jews in accordance with German racial policies; while Marc Bloch advocated disobedience, Febvre was passionate about the survival of Annales at any cost. He believed that it was worth making concessions to keep the journal afloat and to keep France's intellectual life alive. Bloch, forced to accede, turned the Annales over to the sole editorship of Febvre, who then changed the journal's name to Mélanges d'Histoire Sociale. Bloch was forced to write for it under the pseudonym Marc Fougères.

In June 1944, Marc Bloch was executed, and so Febvre became the man who carried the Annales into the post-war period, most notably by training Fernand Braudel and co-founding the VI section of the École Pratique des Hautes Etudes, later known as École des Hautes Études en Sciences Sociales (EHESS).

Febvre died in 1956 in Saint-Amour, France, where the College Lucien Febvre and Avenue Lucien Febvre are named after him. He is also honoured in street names in Besancon and Strasbourg.

== Works by Lucien Febvre ==
- A Geographical Introduction to History. in collaboration with Lionel Bataillon, London 1925 (La Terre et l'évolution humaine : introduction géographique à l'histoire. Paris 1922)
- Martin Luther, A Destiny. New York 1929. (Un destin. Martin Luther, Presses Universitaires de France, Paris, 1928)
- Une Question Mal Posée, 1929.
- The Rhine: Problems of History and Economics (Le Rhin: Problèmes d'histoire et d'économie, Paris 1935) Co-authored with Albert Demangeon
- The Problem of Unbelief in the Sixteenth Century: The Religion of Rabelais. trans. Beatrice Gottlieb. Harvard University Press: Cambridge, Mass.; London, 1982. (Le problème de l'incroyance au 16e siècle : la religion de Rabelais. Albin Michel: Paris, 1942)
- The Coming of the Book: The Impact of Printing 1450–1800, co-written with Henri-Jean Martin, London 1976. (L'apparition du livre, Paris 1958)
- A New Kind of History (selected essays) (1973).

== See also ==
- École Pratique des Hautes Études
- École des Hautes Études en Sciences Sociales
