= Incunable =

Works printed in Europe before 1501

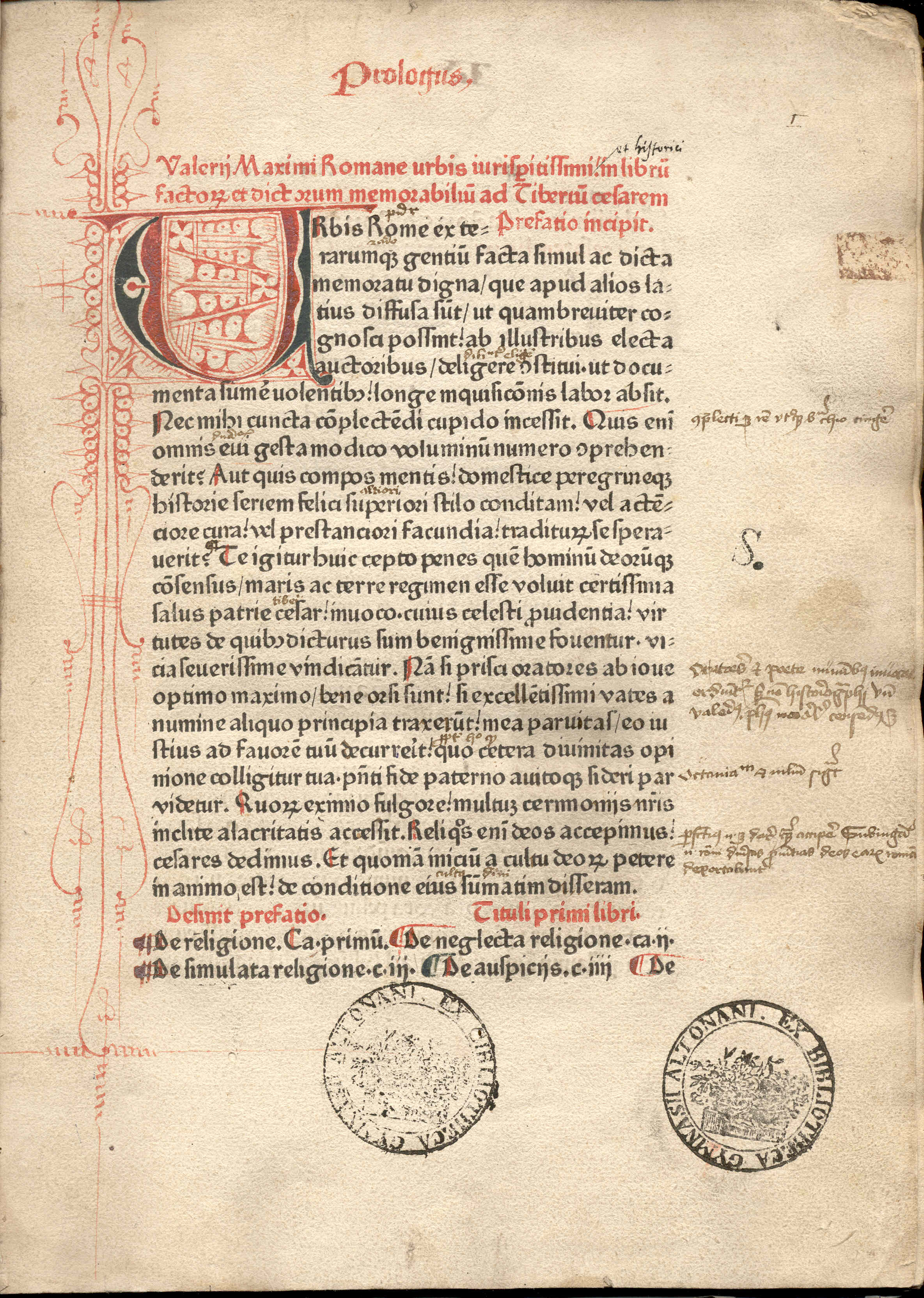
Page from Valerius Maximus, Facta et dicta memorabilia, printed in red and black by Peter Schöffer (Mainz, 1471). The page exhibits a rubricated initial letter "U" and decorations, marginalia, and ownership stamps of the "Bibliotheca Gymnasii Altonani" (Hamburg).

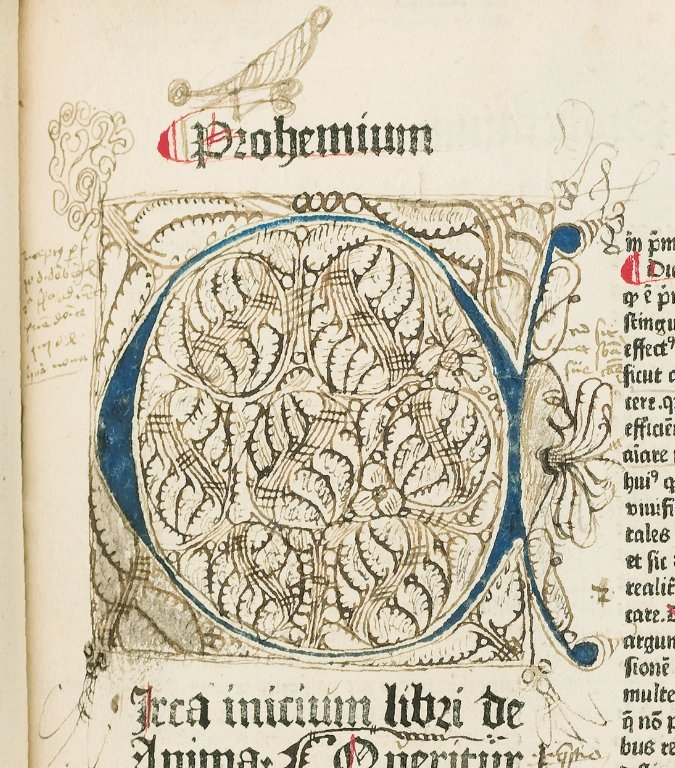
Illumination with doodles and drawings (marginalia), including an open-mouthed human profile, with multiple tongues sticking out. Copulata, "De Anima", f. 2a. HMD Collection, WZ 230 M772c 1485

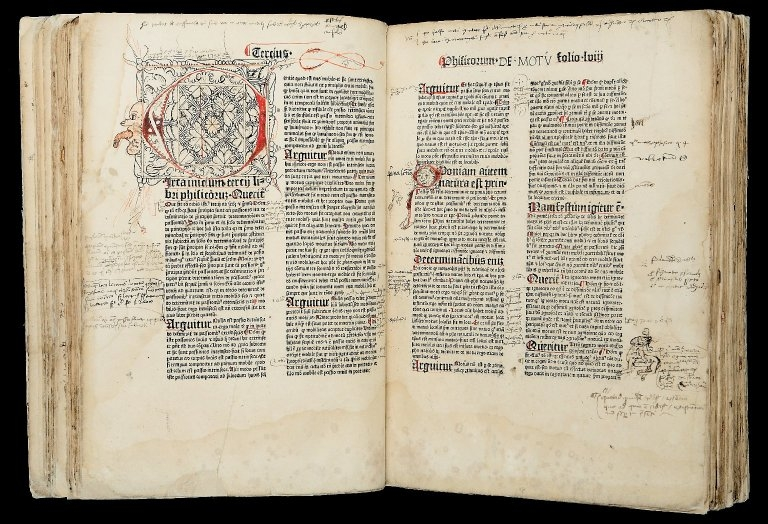
Image of two facing pages from "Phisicorum", fols. 57b and 58a, with doodles and drawings. HMD Collection, WZ 230 M772c 1485

An incunable or incunabulum (pl.: incunables or incunabula, respectively) is a book, pamphlet, or broadside that was printed in the earliest stages of printing in Europe, up to the year 1500. The specific date is essentially arbitrary, but the number of printed book editions exploded in the following century, so that all incunabula, produced before the printing press became widespread in Europe, are rare, where even some early 16th-century books are relatively common.

They are distinct from manuscripts, which are documents written by hand. Some authorities on the history of printing include block books from the same time period as incunabula, whereas others limit the term to works printed using movable type.

As of 2021, there are about 30,000 distinct incunable editions known. The probable number of surviving individual copies is much higher, estimated at 125,000 in Germany alone. Through statistical analysis, it is estimated that the number of lost editions is at least 20,000. Around 550,000 copies of around 27,500 different works have been preserved worldwide.

== Terminology ==
Incunable is the anglicised form of incunabulum, reconstructed singular of Latin incunabula, which meant "swaddling clothes", or "cradle", which could metaphorically refer to "the earliest stages or first traces in the development". A former term for incunable is fifteener, meaning "fifteenth-century edition". In German, incunabula are called Wiegendrucke ("cradle prints"), a term that likewise evokes the infancy of printing; it survives in the title of the standard catalogue Gesamtkatalog der Wiegendrucke.

The term incunabula was first used in the context of printing by the Dutch physician and humanist Hadrianus Junius (Adriaen de Jonghe, 1511–1575), in a passage in his work Batavia (written in 1569; published posthumously in 1588). He referred to a period "inter prima artis [typographicae] incunabula" ("in the first infancy of the typographic art"). The term has sometimes been incorrectly attributed to Bernhard von Mallinckrodt (1591–1664), in his Latin pamphlet De ortu ac progressu artis typographicae ("On the rise and progress of the typographic art"; 1640), but he was quoting Junius.

The term incunabula came to denote printed books themselves in the late 17th century. It is not found in English before the mid-19th century.

Junius set an end-date of 1500 to his era of incunabula, which remains the convention in modern bibliographical scholarship. This convenient but arbitrary end-date for identifying a printed book as an incunable does not reflect changes in the printing process, and many books printed for some years after 1500 are visually indistinguishable from incunables. The term "post-incunable" is now used to refer to books printed after 1500 up to 1520 or 1540, without general agreement. From around this period the dating of any edition becomes easier, as the practice of printing the place and year of publication using a colophon or on the title page became more widespread.

== Types ==
There are two types of printed incunabula: the block book, printed from a single carved or sculpted wooden block for each page (the same process as the woodcut in art, called xylographic); and the typographic book, made by individual cast-metal movable type pieces on a printing press. Many authors reserve the term "incunabula" for the latter.

The spread of printing to cities both in the North and in Italy ensured that there was great variety in the texts and the styles which appeared. Many early typefaces were modelled on local writing or derived from various European Gothic scripts, but there were also some derived from documentary scripts like Caxton's, and, particularly in Italy, types modelled on handwritten scripts and calligraphy used by humanists.

Printers congregated in urban centres where there were scholars, ecclesiastics, lawyers, and nobles and professionals who formed their major customer base. Standard works in Latin inherited from the medieval tradition formed the bulk of the earliest printed works, but as books became cheaper, vernacular works (or translations into vernaculars of standard works) began to appear.

== Famous examples ==
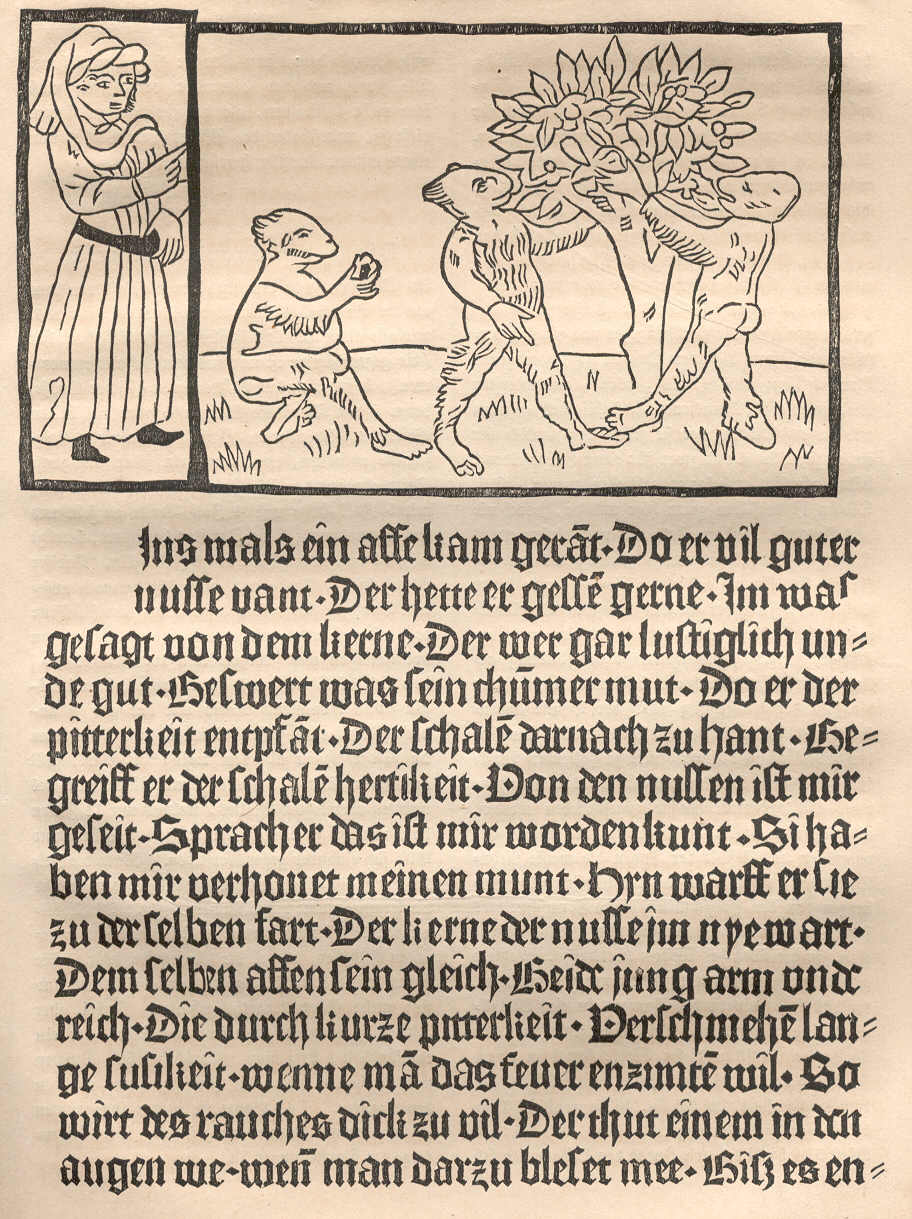
First incunable with illustrations, Ulrich Boner's Der Edelstein, printed by Albrecht Pfister, Bamberg, 1461

Famous incunabula include two from Mainz, the Gutenberg Bible of 1455 and the Peregrinatio in terram sanctam of 1486, printed and illustrated by Erhard Reuwich; the Nuremberg Chronicle of 1493, written by Hartmann Schedel and printed by Anton Koberger; and the Hypnerotomachia Poliphili of 1499, printed by Aldus Manutius, with important illustrations by an unknown artist.

Other printers of incunabula were Günther Zainer of Augsburg, Johannes Mentelin and Heinrich Eggestein of Strasbourg, Heinrich Gran of Haguenau, Johann Amerbach of Basel, William Caxton of Bruges and London, and Nicolas Jenson of Venice. The first incunable to have woodcut illustrations was Ulrich Boner's Der Edelstein, printed by Albrecht Pfister in Bamberg in 1461.

A finding in 2015 brought evidence of quires, as claimed by research, possibly printed in 1444–1446 and possibly assigned to Procopius Waldvogel of Avignon, France.

== Post-incunable ==
Many incunabula are undated, needing complex bibliographical analysis to place them correctly. The post-incunabula period marks a time of development during which the printed book evolved fully as a mature artefact with a standard format. After about 1540 books tended to conform to a pattern that included the author, title-page, date, seller, and place of printing. This makes it much easier to identify any particular edition.

As noted above, the end date for identifying a printed book as an incunable is convenient but was chosen arbitrarily; it does not reflect any notable developments in the printing process around the year 1500. Books printed for a number of years after 1500 continued to look much like incunables, with the notable exception of the small format books printed in italic type introduced by Aldus Manutius in 1501. The term post-incunable is sometimes used to refer to books printed "after 1500—how long after, the experts have not yet agreed." For books printed in England, the term generally covers 1501–1520, and for books printed in mainland Europe, 1501–1540.

One notable example from this period is Hakob Meghapart (Hagop Meghapart), who in 1512 became the first known printer of Armenian books. Working in Venice, he published Urbatagirk (The Book of Friday) and several other early Armenian printed works. His books retained characteristics of manuscript tradition, including red and black ink and decorative initials, aligning them stylistically with incunabula despite being post-incunable by definition.

== Statistical data ==
Printing centres in Europe

Incunabula distribution by region

Incunabula distribution by language

The data in this section were derived from the Incunabula Short-Title Catalogue (ISTC).

The number of printing towns and cities stands at 282. These are situated in some 18 countries in terms of present-day boundaries. In descending order of the number of editions printed in each, these are: Italy, Germany, France, the Netherlands, Switzerland, Spain, Belgium, England, Austria, the Czech Republic, Portugal, Poland, Sweden, Denmark, Turkey, Croatia, Serbia, Montenegro, and Hungary (see diagram).

The following table shows the 20 main 15th-century printing locations; as with all data in this section, exact figures are given, but should be treated as close estimates (the total editions recorded in ISTC at August 2016 is 30,518):

Town or city	No. of editions	% of ISTC recorded editions
Venice	3,549	12.5
Paris	2,764	9.7
Rome	1,922	6.8
Cologne	1,530	5.4
Lyon	1,364	4.8
Leipzig	1,337	4.7
Augsburg	1,219	4.3
Strasbourg	1,158	4.1
Milan	1,101	3.9
Nuremberg	1,051	3.7
Florence	801	2.8
Basel	786	2.8
Deventer	613	2.2
Bologna	559	2.0
Antwerp	440	1.5
Mainz	418	1.5
Ulm	398	1.4
Speyer	354	1.2
Pavia	337	1.2
Naples	323	1.1
TOTAL	22,024	77.6

The 18 languages that incunabula are printed in, in descending order, are: Latin, German, Italian, French, Dutch, Spanish, English, Hebrew, Catalan, Czech, Greek, Church Slavonic, Portuguese, Swedish, Breton, Danish, Frisian and Sardinian (see diagram).

Only about one edition in ten (i.e. just over 3,000) has any illustrations, woodcuts or metalcuts.

The "commonest" incunable is Schedel's Nuremberg Chronicle ("Liber Chronicarum") of 1493, with about 1,250 surviving copies (which is also the most heavily illustrated). Many incunabula are unique, but on average about 18 copies survive of each. This makes the Gutenberg Bible, at 48 or 49 known copies, a relatively common (though extremely valuable) edition. Counting extant incunabula is complicated by the fact that most libraries consider a single volume of a multi-volume work as a separate item, as well as fragments or copies lacking more than half the total leaves. A complete incunable may consist of a slip, or up to ten volumes.

In terms of format, the 30,000-odd editions comprise: 2,000 broadsides, 9,000 folios, 15,000 quartos, 3,000 octavos, 18 12mos, 230 16mos, 20 32mos, and 3 64mos.

Apart from migration to mainly North American and Japanese universities, there has been little movement of incunabula in the last five centuries. None were printed in the Southern Hemisphere, and the latter appears to possess fewer than 2,000 copies, while about 97.75% remain north of the equator. However, many incunabula are sold at auction or through the rare book trade every year.

== Major collections ==
The British Library's Incunabula Short Title Catalogue now records over 29,000 titles, of which around 27,400 are incunabula editions (not all unique works). Studies of incunabula began in the 17th century. Michel Maittaire (1667–1747) and Georg Wolfgang Panzer (1729–1805) arranged printed material chronologically in annals format, and in the first half of the 19th century, Ludwig Hain published the Repertorium bibliographicum—a checklist of incunabula arranged alphabetically by author: "Hain numbers" are still a reference point. Hain was expanded in subsequent editions, by Walter A. Copinger and Dietrich Reichling, but it is being superseded by the authoritative modern listing, a German catalogue, the Gesamtkatalog der Wiegendrucke, which has been under way since 1925 and is still being compiled at the Staatsbibliothek zu Berlin. North American holdings were listed by Frederick R. Goff and a worldwide union catalogue is provided by the Incunabula Short Title Catalogue.

Notable collections with more than 1,000 incunabula include:

Library	Location	Country	Number of copies	Number of editions	Ref.
Bavarian State Library	Munich	Germany	19,717	9,381	
British Library	London	UK	12,500	10,390	
Bibliothèque nationale de France	Paris	France	12,000	8,000	
Vatican Library	Vatican City	Vatican City	8,600	5,400 (more than)	
Austrian National Library	Vienna	Austria	8,030		
National Library of Russia	Saint Petersburg	Russia	7,302		
Württembergische Landesbibliothek	Stuttgart	Germany	7,093		
Bodleian Library	Oxford	UK	6,755	5,623	
Library of Congress	Washington, D.C.	US	5,700		
Russian State Library	Moscow	Russia	5,360		
Huntington Library	San Marino, California	US	5,000 (more than)		
Cambridge University Library	Cambridge	UK	4,650 (more than)		
Biblioteca Nazionale Vittorio Emanuele III	Naples	Italy	4,563		
Danish Royal Library	Copenhagen	Denmark	4,500		
John Rylands Research Institute and Library	Manchester	UK	4,500		
Berlin State Library	Berlin	Germany	4,496		
Harvard University	Cambridge, Massachusetts	US	4,389	3,627	
National Library of the Czech Republic	Prague	Czech Republic	4,200		
National Central Library of Florence	Florence	Italy	4,089		
Leipzig University Library	Leipzig	Germany	3,800		
Jagiellonian Library	Kraków	Poland	3,671		
University Library of LMU Munich	Munich	Germany	3,598		
Bamberg State Library	Bamberg	Germany	3,550		
Yale University (Beinecke Rare Book and Manuscript Library)	New Haven, Connecticut	US	3,525 (all collections)		
Herzog August Library	Wolfenbüttel	Germany	3,477	2,835	
University Library Freiburg	Freiburg im Breisgau	Germany	3,448		
Wrocław University Library	Wrocław	Poland	3,250 (more than)		
Biblioteca Nacional de España	Madrid	Spain	3,159	2,298	
Göttingen State and University Library	Göttingen	Germany	3,100		
Library of the University of Würzburg	Würzburg	Germany	3,100		
Palatina Library	Parma	Italy	3,042		
Basel University Library	Basel	Switzerland	3,000 (more than)		
Biblioteca Marciana	Venice	Italy	2,887		
Frankfurt University Library	Frankfurt	Germany	2,800		
Uppsala University Library	Uppsala	Sweden	2,500		
Biblioteca comunale dell'Archiginnasio	Bologna	Italy	2,500 (circa)		
Bibliothèque Mazarine	Paris	France	2,400	2,120	
Braidense National Library	Milan	Italy	2,368		
Library of the University of Cologne	Cologne	Germany	2,350		
Les Dominicains de Colmar	Colmar	France	2,300		
Newberry Library	Chicago	US	2,200 (more than)		
Casanatense Library	Rome	Italy	2,200		
National Library of the Netherlands	The Hague	Netherlands	2,200		
Library of the University of Tübingen	Tübingen	Germany	2,148		
Library of the University of Innsbruck (Universitäts- und Landesbibliothek)	Innsbruck	Austria	2,122	1,889	
National and University Library	Strasbourg	France	2,120 (circa) (7,000 destroyed by fire in the 1870 Siege of Strasbourg)		
Nuremberg Public Library	Nuremberg	Germany	2,100		
Library Angelo Mai	Bergamo	Italy	2,100		
Morgan Library	New York	US	2,000 (more than)		
Library of the University of Erlangen–Nuremberg	Erlangen	Germany	2,000 (more than)		
Biblioteca Nazionale Centrale di Roma	Rome	Italy	2,000		
National Széchényi Library	Budapest	Hungary	1,800 (more than)		
Heidelberg University Library	Heidelberg	Germany	1,800		
Estense University Library	Modena	Italy	1,662		
Bibliothèque de l'Arsenal	Paris	France	1,623		
Turin National University Library	Turin	Italy	1,600 (more than)		
Universitäts- und Landesbibliothek Sachsen-Anhalt	Halle (Saale)	Germany	1,600		
Biblioteca Nacional de Portugal	Lisbon	Portugal	1,597		
Biblioteca Universitaria di Padova	Padua	Italy	1,583		
Zentralbibliothek Zürich	Zürich	Switzerland	1,562		
Strahov Monastery Library	Prague	Czech Republic	1,500 (more than)		
Bibliothèque Sainte-Geneviève	Paris	France	1,500		
Universitätsbibliothek Salzburg	Salzburg	Austria	1,385		
Baden State Library	Karlsruhe	Germany	1,365		
University Library of Bonn	Bonn	Germany	1,338	1,307	
Biblioteca Augusta	Perugia	Italy	1,330		
University Library in Genoa	Genoa	Italy	1,321		
Trivulziana Library	Milan	Italy	1,300		
Bibliothèque municipale de Lyon	Lyon	France	1,300		
Library of the Catholic University of Eichstätt-Ingolstadt	Eichstätt	Germany	1,290		
Walters Art Museum	Baltimore, Maryland	US	1,280		
Verona Municipal Library	Verona	Italy	1,230		
Bryn Mawr College Library	Bryn Mawr, Pennsylvania	US	1,225 (more than)		
Library Teresiana	Mantua	Italy	1,281	1,083	
Ratsschulbibliothek Zwickau	Zwickau	Germany	1,200		
University of Illinois at Urbana–Champaign	Urbana, Illinois	US	1,200 (more than)		
National Library of Poland	Warsaw	Poland	1,198	1,031	
Biblioteca Colombina	Seville	Spain	1,194		
Queriniana Library	Brescia	Italy	1,158		
Central Library of the Region of Sicily	Palermo	Italy	1,136		
University of Graz Library	Graz	Austria	1,115		
Angelica Library	Rome	Italy	1,100		
University of Glasgow	Glasgow	UK	1,062		
University Library in Bologna	Bologna	Italy	1,021		
Bridwell Library	Dallas, Texas	US	1,000 (more than)		
Library Passerini Landi	Piacenza	Italy	1,000 (more than)		
Columbia University Libraries	New York, NY	US	1,000 (more than)		
Abbey library of Saint Gall	St. Gallen	Switzerland	1,000		
Library Intronati	Siena	Italy	1,000 (circa)		
National Library of Serbia	Belgrade	Serbia	1,000 (circa)		
National and University Library in Zagreb	Zagreb	Croatia	1,000 (circa)		
Bibliothèque municipale de Besançon	Besançon	France	1,000 (circa)		

== See also ==
- Global spread of the printing press
- History of books
- Book collecting
- Hebrew incunabula
