= Folio =

Technical term describing the format or size of a book

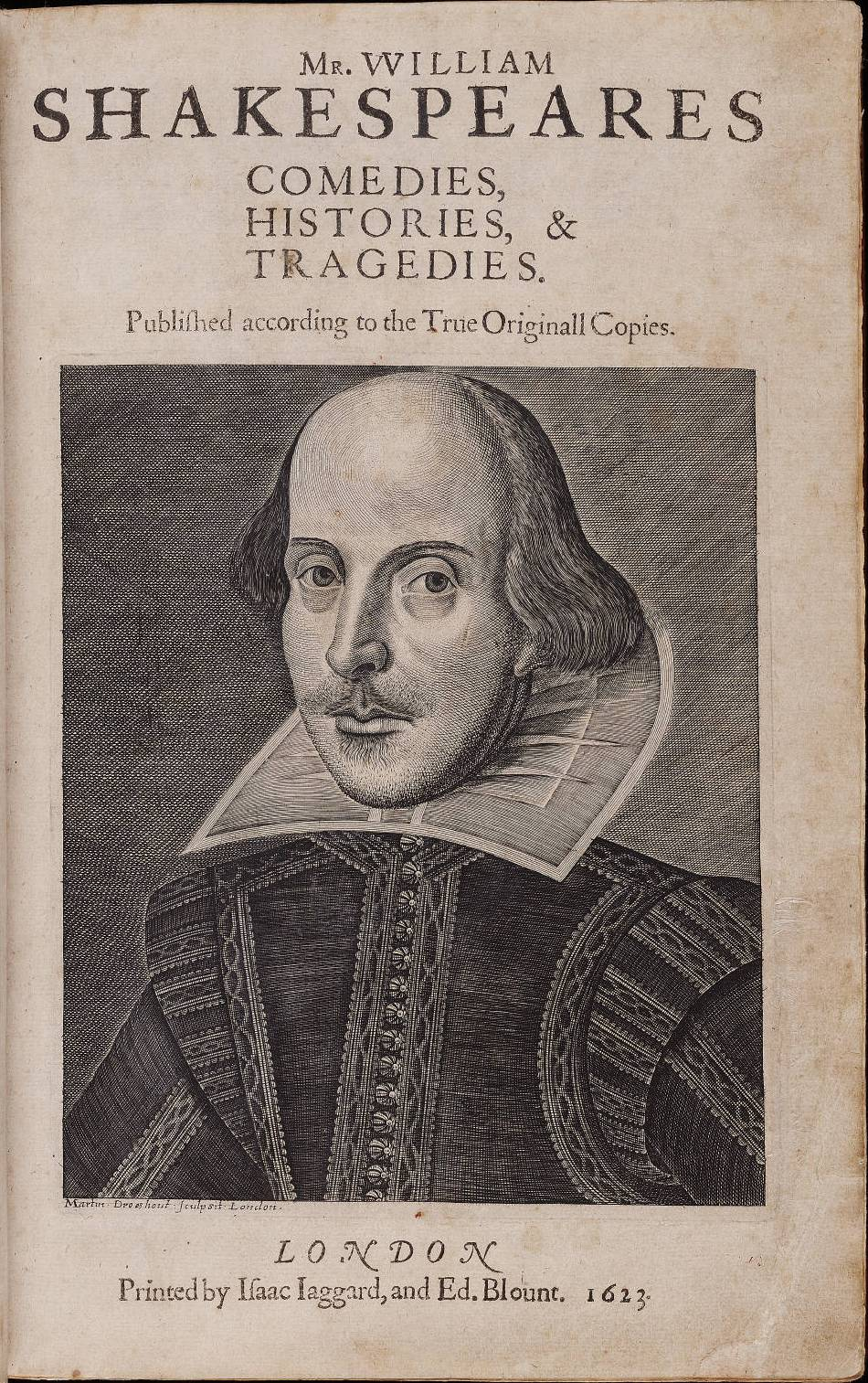
The title-page of the Shakespeare First Folio, 1623

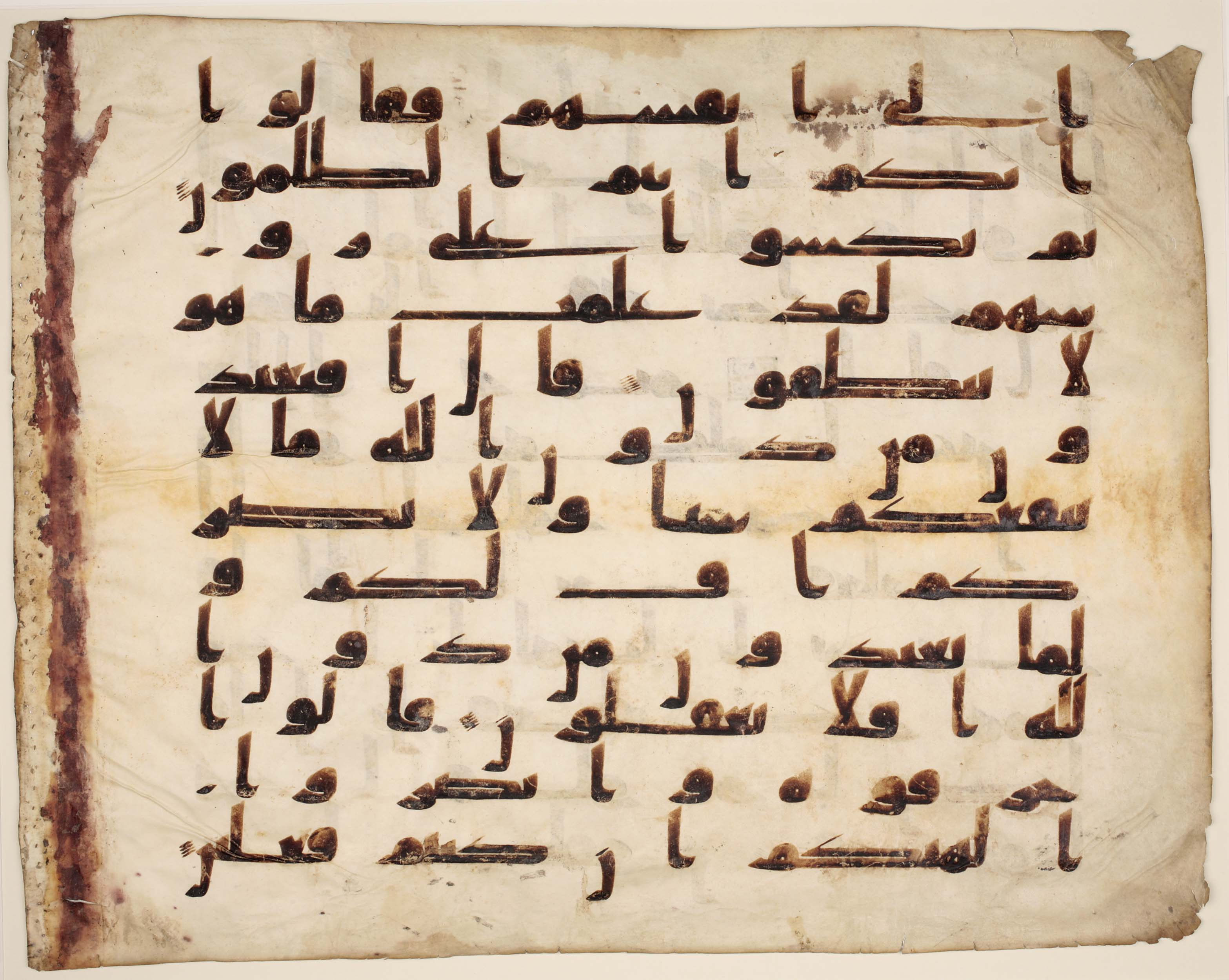
Single folio from a large Qur'an, North Africa, 8th c. (Khalili Collection)

The term "folio" (from Latin folium 'leaf') has three interconnected but distinct meanings in the world of books and printing: first, it is a term for a common method of arranging sheets of paper into book form, folding the sheet only once, and a term for a book made in this way; second, it is a general term for a sheet, leaf or page in (especially) manuscripts and old books; and third, it is an approximate term for the size of a book, and for a book of this size.

First, a folio (abbreviated fo or 2^{o}) is a book or pamphlet made up of one or more full sheets of paper, on each of which four pages of text are printed, two on each side; each sheet is then folded once to produce two leaves. Each leaf of a folio book thus is one half the size of the original sheet. Ordinarily, additional printed folio sheets would be inserted inside one another to form a group or "gathering" of leaves prior to binding the book.

Second, folio is used in terms of page numbering for some books and most manuscripts that are bound but without page numbers as an equivalent of "page" (both sides), "sheet" or "leaf", using "recto" and "verso" to designate the first and second sides, and (unlike the usage in printing) disregarding whether the leaf concerned is actually physically still joined with another leaf. This usually appears abbreviated: "f26r." means the first side of the 26th leaf in a book. This will be on the right hand side of the opening of any book composed in a script that is read from left to right, such as Latin (as used in English), Cyrillic, or Greek, and will be opposite for books composed in a script that is read from right to left, such as Hebrew and Arabic.

Third, folio is also used as an approximate term for a size of book, typically about 15 inches (38 cm) tall, and as such does not necessarily indicate the actual printing format of the books, which may even be unknown as is the case for many modern books. Other common book formats are quarto and octavo, which are both also printing formats, involving two and three folds in the sheet respectively.

The folio: printing, folding and cutting, compared to the quarto and octavo

Famous folios (in both senses) include the Gutenberg Bible, printed in about 1455, and the First Folio collected edition of Shakespeare's plays, printed in 1623; however, their actual size is rather different.

== Format ==
A folio (from Latin foliō, abl. of folium, leaf) is a book or pamphlet made up of one or more full sheets of paper, on each sheet of which four pages of text are printed, two on each side; each sheet is then folded one time to produce two leaves. Each leaf of a folio book thus is one half the size of the original sheet. This contrasts with a quarto, folding each sheet twice, and octavo, folding each sheet three times. Unlike the folio, these last, and further types involving more folds, require the pages of the book to be cut open after binding, which might be done mechanically by the printer, but in historic books was often left for the reader to do with a paper-knife.

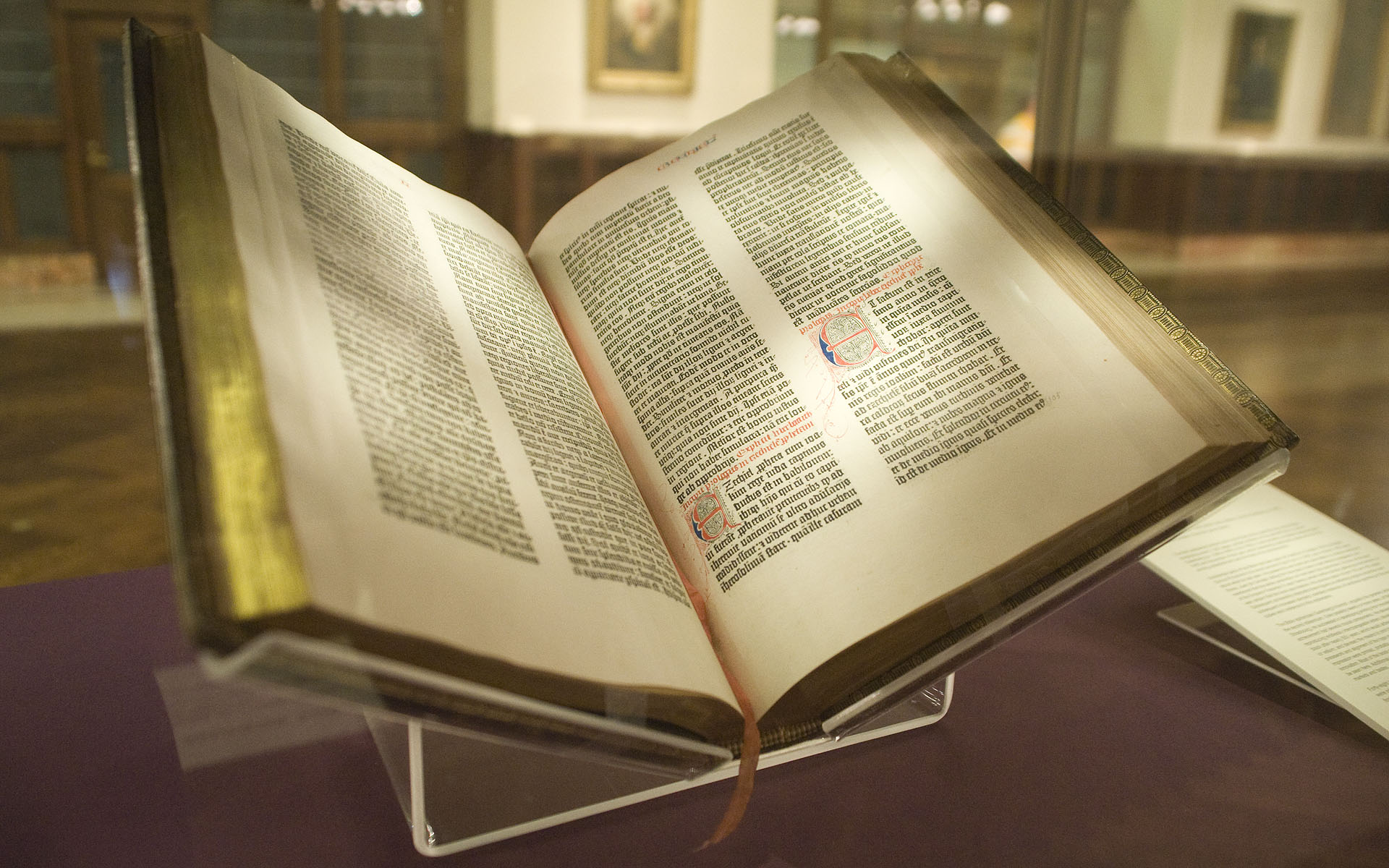
Copy of the Gutenberg Bible, printed in folio format

There are variations in how folios are produced. For example, bibliographers call a book printed as a folio (two leaves per full sheet), but bound in gatherings of 8 leaves each, a "folio in 8s."

The Gutenberg Bible was printed in about 1455 as a folio, in which four pages of text were printed on each sheet of paper, which were then folded once. The page size is 12 x 17.5 inches (307 x 445 mm), a "double folio" size. Several such folded conjugate pairs of leaves were inserted inside one another to produce the sections or gatherings, which were then sewn together to form the final book. Shakespeare's First Folio edition is printed as a folio and has a page height of 12.5 inches (320 mm), making it a rather small folio size.

Folios were a common format of books printed in the incunabula period (books printed before 1501), although the earliest printed book, surviving only as a fragment of a leaf, is a quarto. The British Library Incunabula Short Title Catalogue lists about 28,100 different editions of surviving books, pamphlets and broadsides (some fragmentary only) printed before 1501, of which about 8,600 are folios, representing just over 30 percent of all works in the catalogue.

== Page numbering ==
Left-to-right language books (such as English)

Right-to-left language books (such as Arabic)

In the discussion of manuscripts, a folio means a leaf with two pages, the recto being the first the reader encounters, and the verso the second. In Western books, which are read by turning the pages over from right to left, when the book is begun with the open page edges at the reader's right, the first page to be seen is "folio 1 recto", typically abbreviated to "f1 r.". When this page is turned over "f1 v." is on the left and "f2 r." on the right of the "opening", or two pages that are visible. For books in Arabic, Hebrew, Japanese and other languages, where the book is begun from the back in Western terms, with the open page edges at the reader's left, the numbering also follows the sequence in which the reader encounters.

In the discussion of two-columned manuscripts, a/b/c/d can denote the left- and right-hand columns of recto and verso pages (e.g. "f. 150a" and "f. 150b" are the left and right columns on the recto page, and "f. 150c" and "f. 150d" the left and right columns on the verso page). In the discussion of three-columned manuscripts, notation may make use of folio number + recto/verso + column a/b/c (e.g. "f. 3 v. col. c" references the third column on the verso side of the third folio).

== Size ==
The actual size of a folio book depends on the size of the full sheet of paper on which it was printed, and in older periods these were not standardized, so the term's meaning is only approximate. Historically, printers used a range of names such as (with approximate maximum page height):

- Double Elephant Folio (50 inches, 127 cm)
- Atlas Folio (25 inches, ≈ 63 cm)
- Elephant Folio (23 inches, ≈ 58 cm)
- Royal Folio (20 inches, ≈ 51 cm)
- Medium Folio (18 inches, ≈ 46 cm)
- Crown Folio (15 inches, ≈ 38 cm) (the most common).

From the mid-nineteenth century, technology permitted the manufacture of large sheets or rolls of paper on which books were printed, many text pages at a time. As a result, it became nearly impossible to determine the actual format (i.e., number of leaves formed from each sheet fed into a press). The term "folio" as applied to such books may refer simply to the size, i.e., books that are approximately 15 inches (38 cm) tall.

The term folio in the modern context of paper size commonly refers to foolscap folio, which is print paper sized 8.5×13.5 in (216×343 mm), slightly larger (by 18.7%) than A4 paper.

== Shakespeare folios ==
From the earliest days of printing, folios were often used for expensive, prestigious volumes. In the seventeenth century, plays of the English Renaissance theatre were printed as collected editions in folio. Thirty-six of Shakespeare's plays, for example, were included in the First Folio collected edition of 1623, which was followed by additional folio editions, referred to as the Second Folio, etc. Other playwrights in this period also published their plays in folio editions, such as Ben Jonson's collected works of 1616.

== See also ==
- Bookbinding (includes detailed discussion of various book formats)
- Foolscap folio, paper size of 8.5×13.5 in (216×343 mm) commonly referred to as "folio"
- Octavo
- Quarto
