= Ludwig Hain =

German editor and bibliographer (1781–1836)

Ludwig Friedrich Theodor Hain (5 July 1781, in Stargard – 27 June 1836, in Munich) was a German editor and bibliographer.

He studied classical philology and Oriental languages at the University of Halle, and from 1802 lived and worked in Weimar. For several years he was an editor of Brockhaus' Conversations-Lexikon in Altenburg (from 1812) and Leipzig. Later on in his career, he worked as private scholar in Munich.

He is best known as the compiler of Repertorium bibliographicum (1822), a pioneering short title catalogue of incunabula. "Hain numbers" are still used as common bibliographical references.

His work has since been superseded by the Incunabula Short Title Catalogue (ISTC) at the British Library and the Gesamtkatalog der Wiegendrucke (GW) at the Staatsbibliothek zu Berlin.

== Bibliography ==
- John Carter; Nicolas Barker (2004). "Hain". ABC for Book Collectors (8th ed.). ISBN 1584561122.
