= Albrecht Pfister =

German printer (c. 1420–1466)

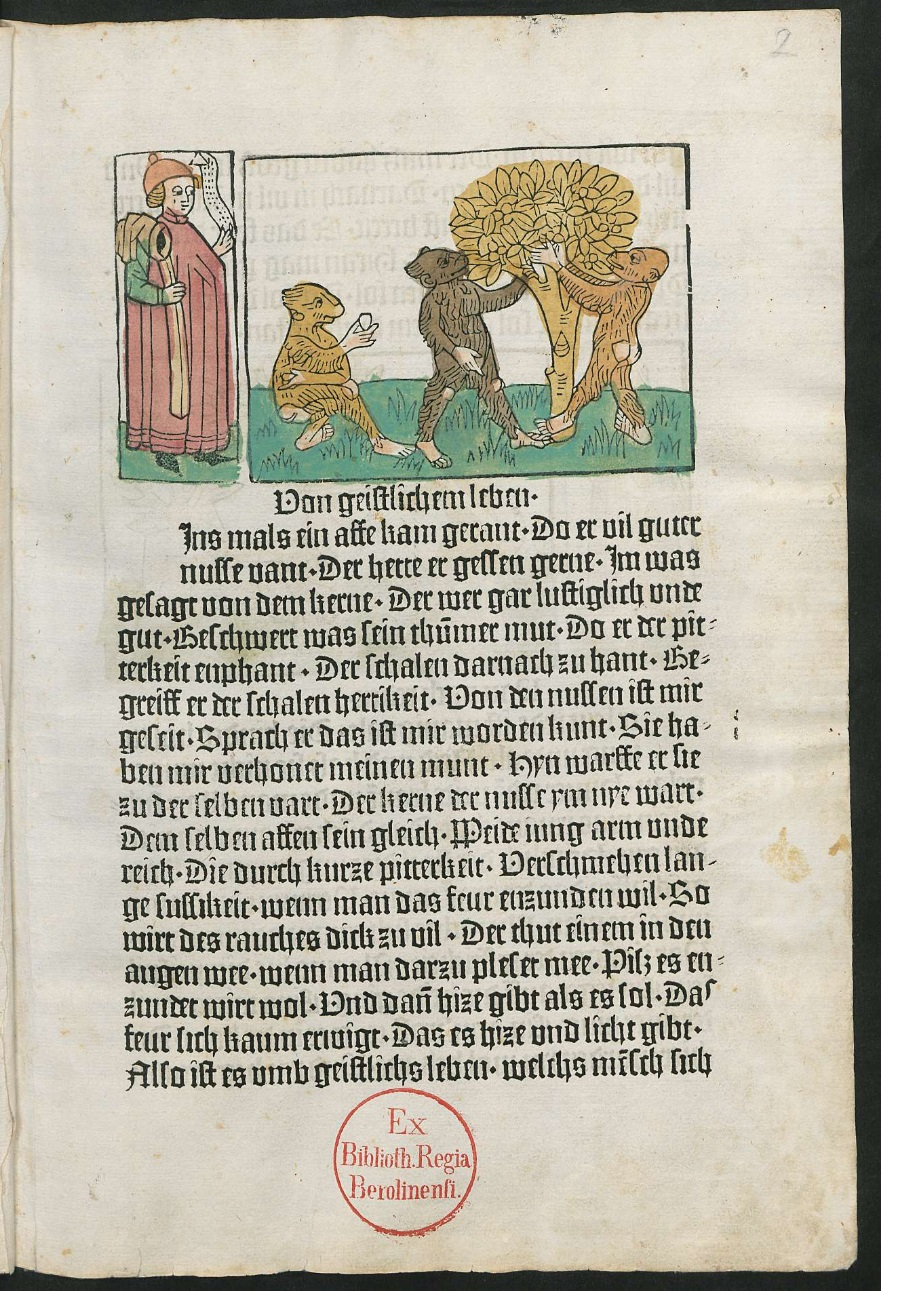
A page from Pfister's second edition of Der Edelstein.

Albrecht Pfister (c. 1420 – c. 1466) was one of the first European printers to use movable type, following its invention by Johannes Gutenberg. Working in Bamberg, Germany, he is believed to have been responsible for two innovations in the use of the new technology: printing books in the German language, and adding woodcuts to printed books. The typefaces of Pfister, although similar to Gutenberg's, have their own peculiarities.

Very little is known of his life. He is known to have been a cleric in Bamberg in 1448, and to have been connected with Georg I von Schaumberg at that time. By 1460, he was acting as secretary to von Schaumberg, who in 1459 had become prince-bishop of Bamberg.

Nine editions are generally ascribed to him. All are believed to date to the 1460s, and possibly all to the early 1460s. These are (not in chronological order):

- two editions of the popular religious work Der Ackermann aus Böhmen in German
- two editions of Ulrich Boner's Der Edelstein in German
- two editions of a Biblia pauperum in German
- a Biblia pauperum in Latin
- a History of Joseph, Daniel, Judith and Esther in German
- an edition of the Belial of Jacobus de Teramo in German

The earlier edition of the Ackermann may have been his first work, and thus both the first illustrated book, and the first book in German, printed with movable type. Its woodcuts are rather crude, are hand-coloured, and are occasionally slightly misplaced on the page. The Belial is the only one of the nine books without woodcut illustrations. Only two of the editions have dates printed in them: the earlier of the two Edelsteins (1461) and the History (1462). Like other very early printers, he concentrated on titles which had already proved popular in manuscript form. He also printed indulgences.

In addition, he has been suggested as the printer of the 36-line Bible of 1458–60. This view has not been favoured by scholars for a century or so, principally because of the superior quality of the Bible's printing, especially compared with Pfister's earliest productions. However the Bible was probably printed in Bamberg, with the D–K type which Pfister later made use of, and which had originated with Gutenberg.

== See also ==
- Incunable
