= Sibyllenbuch fragment =

Earliest known European partial book leaf, printed using movable type

Fragment of the Sibyllenbuch

The Sibyllenbuch fragment is a partial book leaf which may be the earliest surviving remnant of any European book that was printed using movable type. The Sibyllenbuch, or Book of the Sibyls, was a medieval poem which held prophecies concerning the fate of the Holy Roman Empire.

The British Library’s on-line Incunabula Short Title Catalogue dates the Sibyllenbuch fragment to "about 1452–53", making it older than any other example of European movable-type printing, including the c. 1454 Gutenberg Bible. However, various movable-type systems were developed as early as the eleventh century in the history of typography in East Asia.

== Fragment and its text ==
Diagram by Edward Schröder showing likely placement of fragment on one half of a full sheet of paper, based on the position of partial watermark

The Sibyllenbuch fragment consists of a partial paper leaf printed in German using Gothic letter. It is owned by the Gutenberg Museum in Mainz, Germany. The fragment was discovered in 1892 in an old bookbinding in Mainz. The text on the fragment relates to the Last Judgment and therefore sometimes is also called “Das Weltgericht” (German for "the World's Judgement"). The text is part of a fourteenth-century poem of 1040 lines known as the "Sibyllenbuch" (Book of the Sibyls) containing "prophecies concerning the fate of the Holy Roman Empire". The British Library identifies the fragment as coming from a quarto volume, which is a book composed of sheets of paper on which four pages were printed on each side, which were then folded twice to form groups of four leaves or eight pages. From analysis of the location of the watermark on the fragment and the known length of the entire poem, it has been estimated that the complete work contained 37 leaves (74 pages) with 28 lines per page.

== Typeface and dating ==
The typeface used in the Sibyllenbuch is the same as that used in other early fragments attributed to Johannes Gutenberg. In particular these include an Ars minor by Donatus, which was a Latin grammar used for centuries in schools, and also several leaves of a pamphlet called the Turkish Kalendar (Calendar) for 1455, which was likely to have been printed in late 1454. Each month in the Kalendar contains a warning to an important Christian leader about invasion by the Turks. The typeface has been called the DK type after its use by Donatus in the Ars minor, and in the Kalendar. Scholars have identified several different states of this typeface. A later version was used around 1459 to 1460 to print the so-called 36-line Bible. For this reason, the various states of this type have collectively been called the “36-line Bible type.”

Due to the “less finished state of the [DK] font” that was used in the Sibyllenbuch fragment, scholars have concluded it was “plausibly earlier than 1454", the approximate date of Gutenberg's Bible. Although at one time some believed that the fragment dated to the 1440s, it is now believed to have been printed in the early 1450s. George D. Painter concluded that “primitive imperfections” in the typeface of the Sibyllenbuch fragment indicated that it was the earliest of the fragments printed in the DK type. This is consistent with the British Library's dating to "about 1452–53".

== Ink ==
A cyclotron analysis, conducted by the Crocker Nuclear Laboratory at the University of California at Davis in 1987, confirmed that the ink on the Sibyllenbuch has high levels of lead and copper, closely similar to that used for other works printed by Gutenberg.

== Endmatter ==
=== Bibliography ===
- "The Sibyllenbuch", Incunabula Short Title Catalogue (entry), British Library.
- "Bulla Thurcorum", Online digital collections (entry), The Princeton University, 1456.
- Stillwell, Margaret Bingham (1972), The Beginning of the World of Books, 1450 to 1470, New York: Bibliographical Society of America.
