= Franz Pfeiffer (literary scholar) =

Swiss literary scholar (1815–1868)

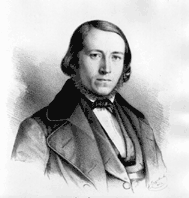
Franz Pfeiffer.

Franz Pfeiffer (February 27, 1815 – May 29, 1868), was a Swiss literary scholar who worked in Germany and Austria.

== Biography ==
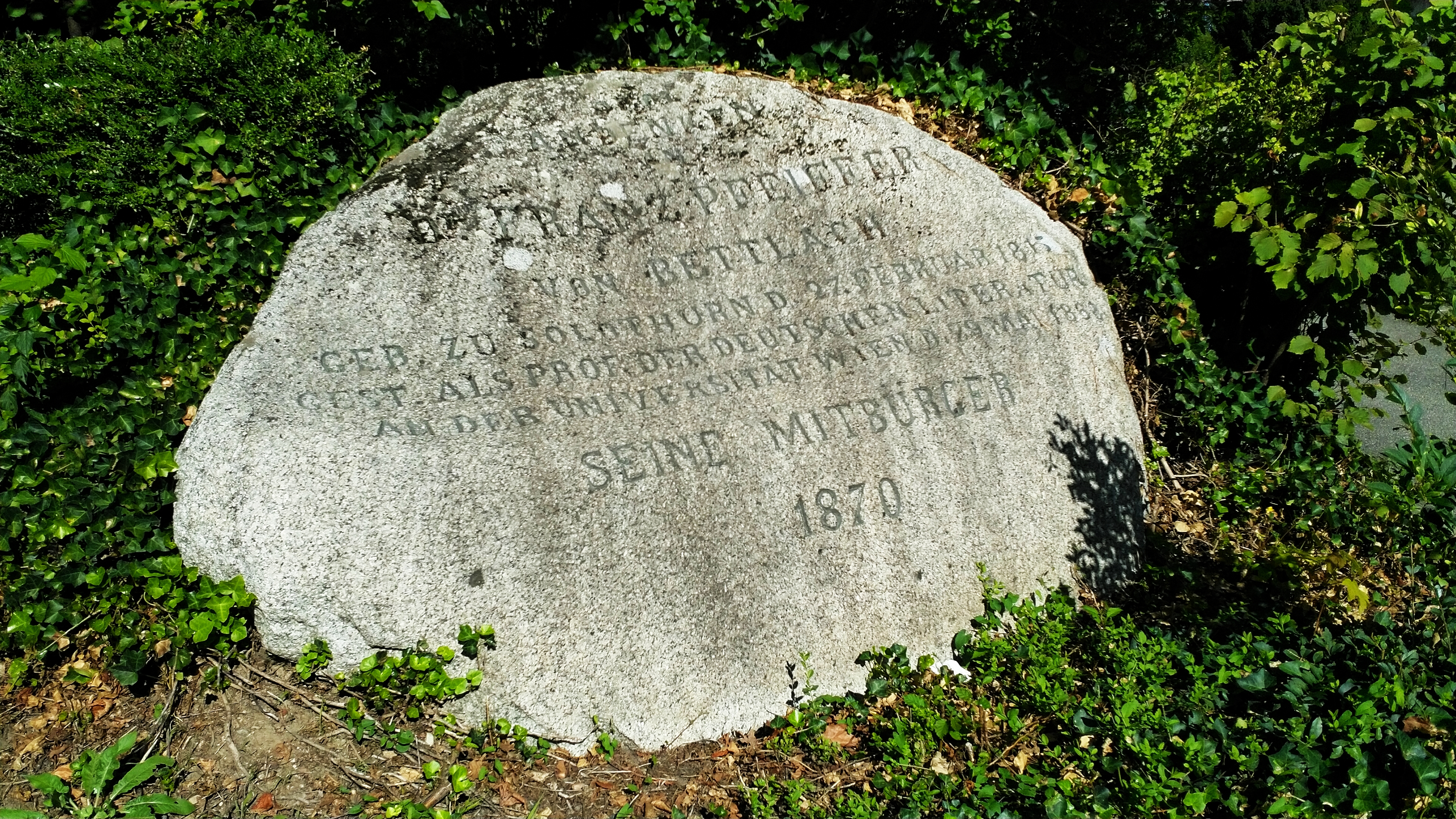
Memorial stone for Franz Pfeiffer in Bettlach, Switzerland, erected in 1870

Franz Pfeiffer was born in Solothurn as a Bürger (citizen) of Bettlach. After studying at the Ludwig-Maximilians-Universität München, he went to Stuttgart, where in 1846 he became librarian to the royal library. In 1856, Pfeiffer founded Germania, a quarterly periodical devoted to German antiquarian research. In 1857, having established himself as one of the foremost authorities on German medieval literature and philology, he was appointed professor of these subjects at the University of Vienna, and in 1860 was made a member of the Imperial Academy of Sciences.

In his later years he traveled regularly to Überlingen am Bodensee to take the waters at the city's spa. He died in Vienna.

== Works ==
Pfeiffer's most significant work is arguably the second volume of his Die deutschen Mystiker (German Mysticism). In this volume Pfeiffer collected the surviving German texts of the 14th Century mystic Meister Eckhart, who was at that time largely forgotten. This publication of the German Eckhartian corpus led to the modern revival of interest in Eckhart. Though there was subsequent dispute as to how many of the texts in Pfeiffer's edition are genuinely by Eckhart, his edition remains a classic reference, though it has been superseded by the critical edition begun in 1936 under the aegis of the Deutsche Forschungsgemeinschaft and only now nearing completion. The early translators of Eckhart into English, Evans and Blakney, depended largely on Pfeiffer for their source material.

His own work:

- Zur deutschen Literaturgeschichte
- Freie Forschung: kleine Schriften zur Geschichte der deutschen Litteratur und Sprache (1867)
- Über Wesen und Bildung der hofischen Sprache in mittelhochdeutscher Zeit
- Der Dichter des Nibelungenliedes (1862)
- Forschung und Kritik auf dem Gebiete des deutschen Altertums
- Altdeutsches Übungsbuch.

He edited:

- Barlaam und Josaphat, Rudolf von Ems (1843)
- Der Edelstein, Ulrich Boner (1844)
- Die deutschen Mystiker des 14. Jahrhunderts (1845-1857)
- Nikolaus von Jeroschin, Deutsche Ordenschronik ("Chronicle of the Teutonic Knights," 1854)
- Buch der Natur of Konrad von Megenberg, a 14th-century writer (1861)
- Die Predigten des Berthold von Regensburg, vol. 1 and vol. 2 (1862, 1880)
- Poems of Walther von der Vogelweide (1864; 6th ed., 1880) This work was his contribution to a series he founded called Deutsche Klassiker des Mittelalters ("German classics of the Middle Ages").
