= Frederick R. Goff =

American rare book librarian and specialist in incunabula

Frederick Richmond Goff
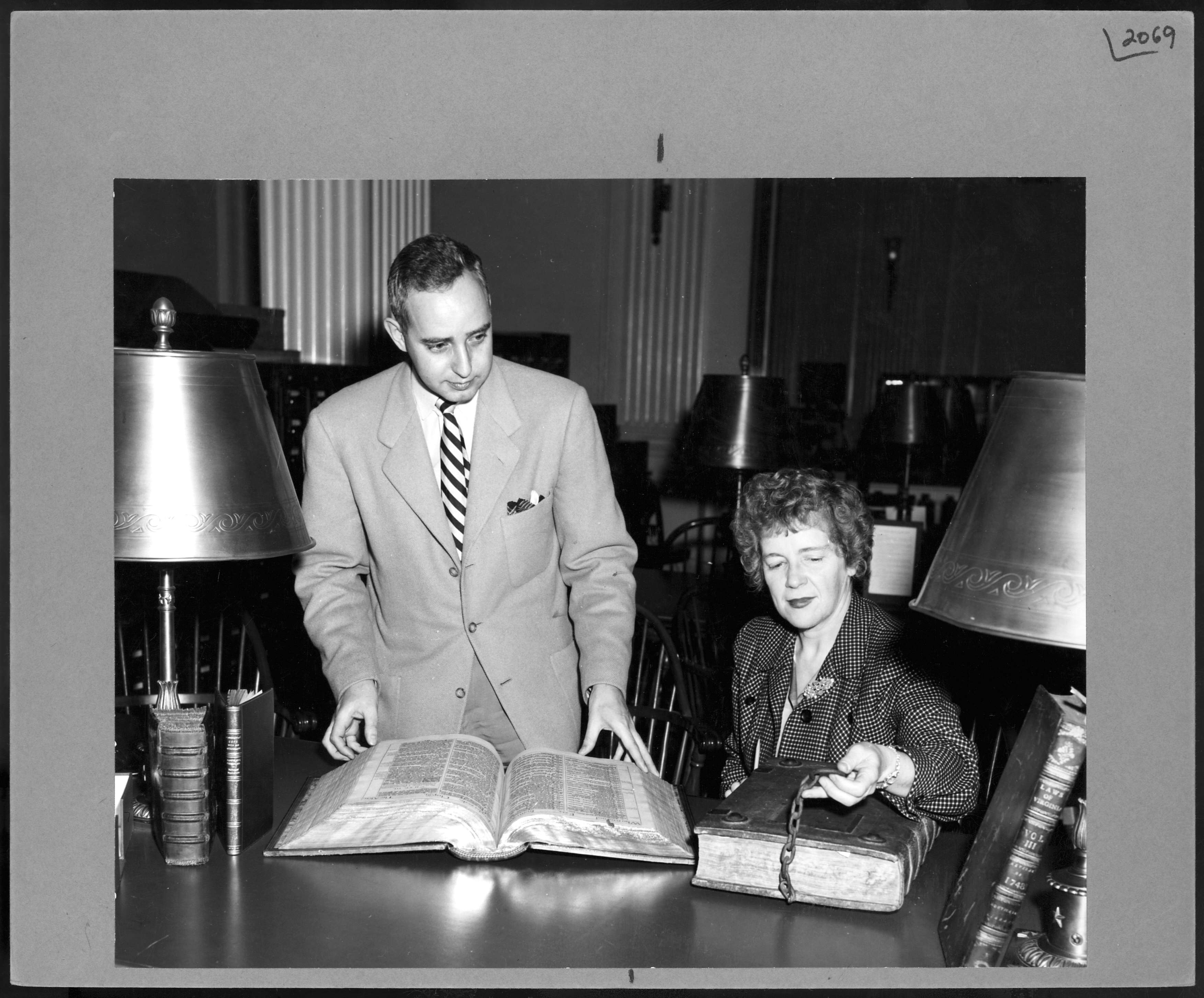
- Frederick R. Goff and Gladys Harris examining two books from the Library of Congress Rare Book Division's collection.
- Born: April 23, 1916; Newport, Rhode Island, US
- Died: September 26, 1982 (aged 66); London
- Occupation: Librarian
- Known for: Incunabula in American Libraries: A Third Census of Fifteenth-century Books Recorded in North American Collections

Frederick Richmond Goff (April 23, 1916 – September 26, 1982) was an American rare book librarian and specialist in incunabula.

== Early life and education ==
Goff was born in Newport, Rhode Island, on April 23, 1916. He earned bachelor's and master's degrees from Brown University.

== Professional life ==
Goff joined the Library of Congress in 1940, became Assistant Chief of the Rare Book Division in 1941, and Chief of the division in 1945. In 1961, he served as chair of the Rare Books and Manuscripts Section of the Association of College and Research Libraries, a division of the American Library Association, and from 1968 to 1970 as president of the Bibliographical Society of America. Goff retired in 1972.

In 1974 he was honored with the Sir Thomas More Medal for Book Collecting, "Private Collecting for the Public Good," by the University of San Francisco Gleeson Library and the Gleeson Library Associates.

== Publications ==
Goff was a prolific author of scholarly works on incunabula, book history, and bibliography. His magnum opus is Incunabula in American Libraries: A Third Census of Fifteenth-century Books Recorded in North American Collections (New York: Bibliographical Society of America, 1964) which later formed the basis for the Incunabula Short Title Catalogue.

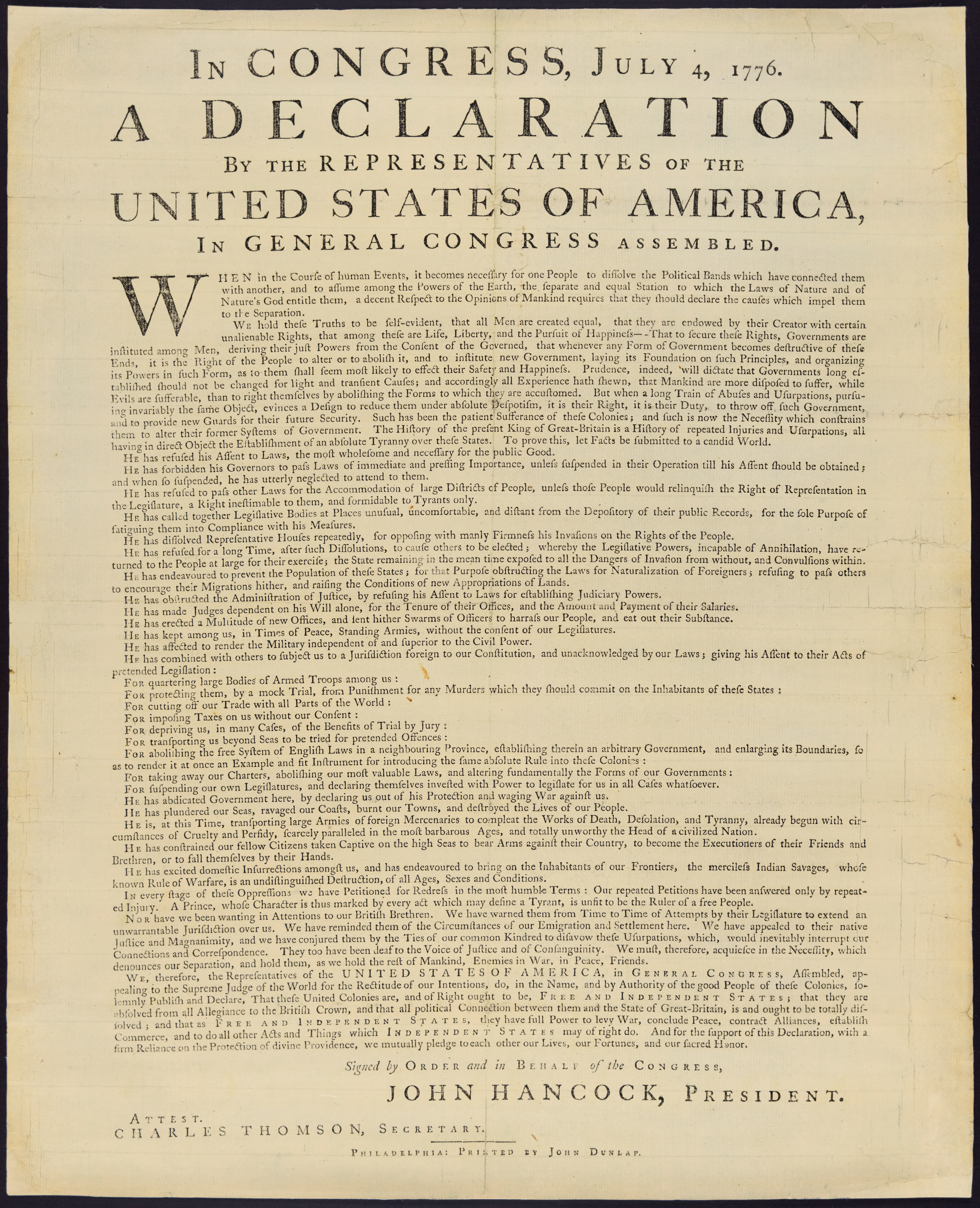
Dunlap broadside copy of the United States Declaration of Independence, LOC

Other publications include:

- Catalog of Broadsides in the Rare Book Division,
- Essays Honoring Lawrence C. Wroth,
- Hebraica: Incunabula in Hebrew Type Only, *
- The Permanence of Johann Gutenberg,
- The John Dunlap Broadside: The First Printing of the Declaration of Independence.

== Library of Congress Intermission Broadcasts ==
Goff was a frequent interviewer on the Library of Congress Intermission Broadcasts during concerts of the Library of Congress Music Division. These included Christopher Columbus' letter of 1493 describing the voyage in which he discovered America, Shakespeare first folios and The Gutenberg Bible.

== Death ==
Goff died of kidney failure and a heart ailment at a London hospital on September 26, 1982. He was in London attending a conference on incunabula. He is buried at Swan Point Cemetery.

The Frederick R. Goff papers, 1916-1982 are held at Princeton University.
