= Procopius Waldvogel =

Medieval printer (15th Century)

Procopius Waldvogel (alternative spellings: Prokop Waldvogel or Procopius Waldfogel) was a medieval printer based in Avignon. It is believed by some that he might have invented printing before Johannes Gutenberg, although Waldvogel maybe learned printing via Gutenberg. Waldvogel lived in the 15th century.

== Life ==
Waldvogel was a German living in Avignon, and was a silversmith by trade. He fled from Prague during the Hussite troubles and stayed in Lucerne, Switzerland. He moved to Avignon in 1444. In Avignon he had two students: Manaud Vitalis and Arnaud de Coselhac. Waldvogel's name appears in several contracts of that time, most notably the one in which he agrees to provide Davin de Caderousse with equipment for reproducing Hebrew texts. Waldvogel disappeared from the historical records after 1446.

== Career ==
It has been claimed by some that he owned molds for printing in 1444, before Johannes Gutenberg. However, unlike Gutenberg, he did not print any books, and Gutenberg had his printing press probably already finished by 1440.

Waldvogel offered to teach the art of artificial writing to a schoolteacher.

In 1890, the French historian Requin claimed that Waldvogel had invented the art of moveable type printing before Johannes Gutenberg. However, Requin never showed any evidence that Waldvogel printed anything, and his allegations are long forgotten.

In 1896, Dutch historian Antonius van der Linde refuted Requin's claims, giving several arguments why Waldvogel cannot be regarded as the inventor of printing: (1) the monetary amounts mentioned in the documents were far too small for Waldvogel to be able to establish a proper printing press; (2) the steel double alphabet, along with the 48 types—one set made of tin and another of iron—and the 27 Hebrew letters mentioned, were too few to be considered proper fonts. They also were not typographical molds, as neither the students nor the dyers could use them without the crucial tool: the casting mold; (3) the nature of the demanded secrecy, once for a radius of 12 miles, and another time for a radius of 30 miles, does not point to a technology as complicated as typography; (4) the kind of instruction and remuneration that were given do not suggest that a real printing press was ever created; (5) it is unlikely that the six typographers present in Avignon (from 1444 to 1446, including Waldvogel) could have disappeared without a trace.

He was a contemporary of other alleged printers of the time, which included Laurens Janszoon Coster, Jean Brito and Panfilo Castaldi.

== Controversial printed quires possibly assigned to Procopius Waldvogel ==
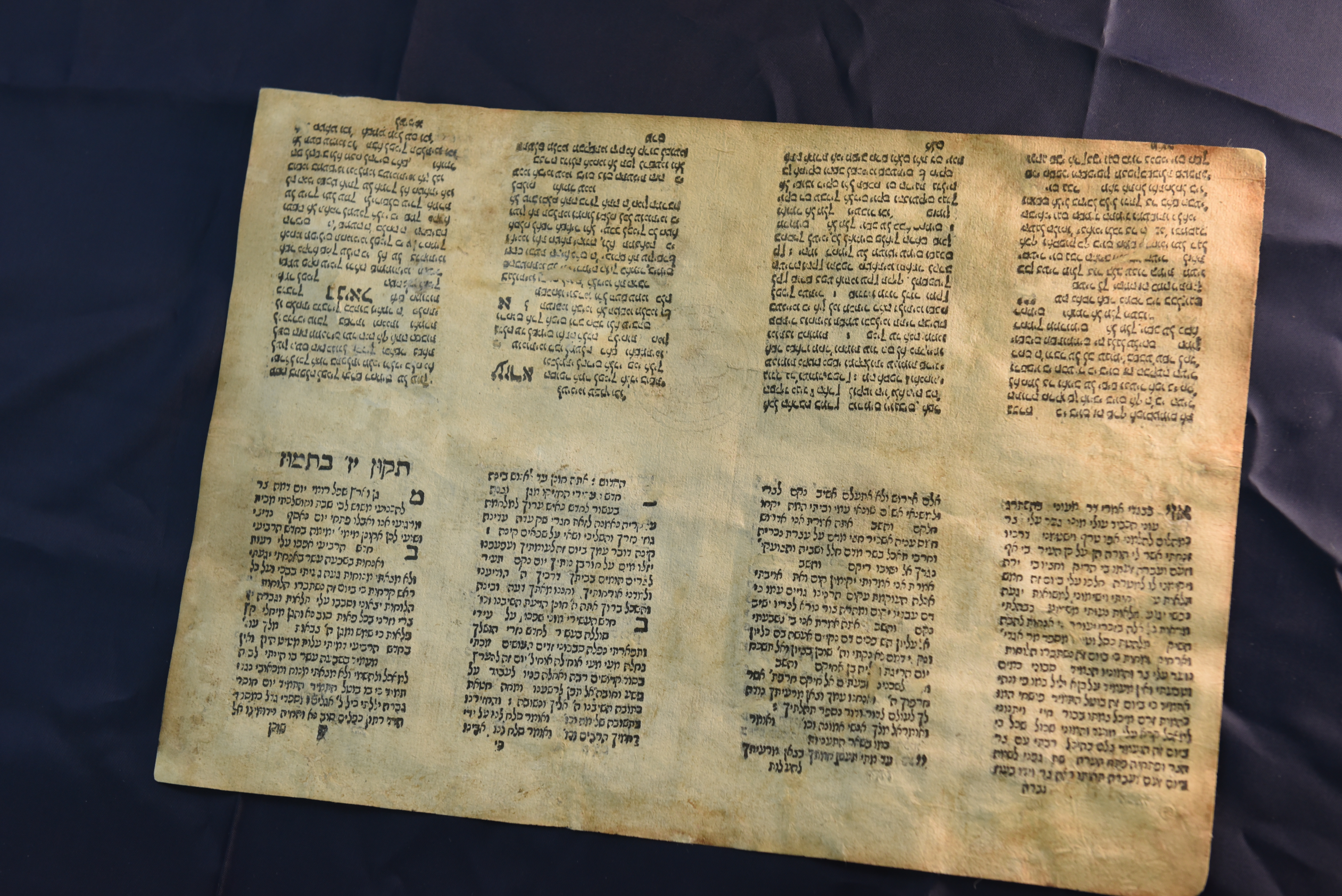
One of the two controversial quires

In 2015, two Hebrew-letter quires with a total of 32 pages were found to be reused in the cover of a book from the 16th century. They were sent by their owner to the Institute of Hebrew Manuscript Research at the National Library of Israel in Jerusalem. The study of their watermarks, paper, ink, typeset typography, made upon request of their owner, concluded that it may be possible that they could have been printed in the area of Avignon around 1444, suggesting that they might be Waldvogel and Davin de Caderousse's work. This finding has received some media coverage, although in the absence of a counter-expertise by independent scholars, the putative link between these printed quires and Waldfogel's entreprise remains purely speculative.

Since 2019, the Institute for Computerized Bibliography of the Hebrew Book published three studies on the sheets, which were brought in 2015 before Yitzhak Yudlov, who was the Head of the Institute for Hebrew Bibliography in Jerusalem for many years, and Benjamin Richler, former Director of the Institute of Microfilmed Hebrew Manuscripts at the National Library in Jerusalem. The publications of the Institute for Computerized Bibliography of the Hebrew Book dealt with three components of the sheets, namely paper, watermark and typography. Regarding the identification of those sheets, they wrote: "In our opinion, these are the sheets from the printing experiments of Prokop Waldvogel and Davin de Caderousse".
