= Gesamtkatalog der Wiegendrucke =

Catalogue of incunabula

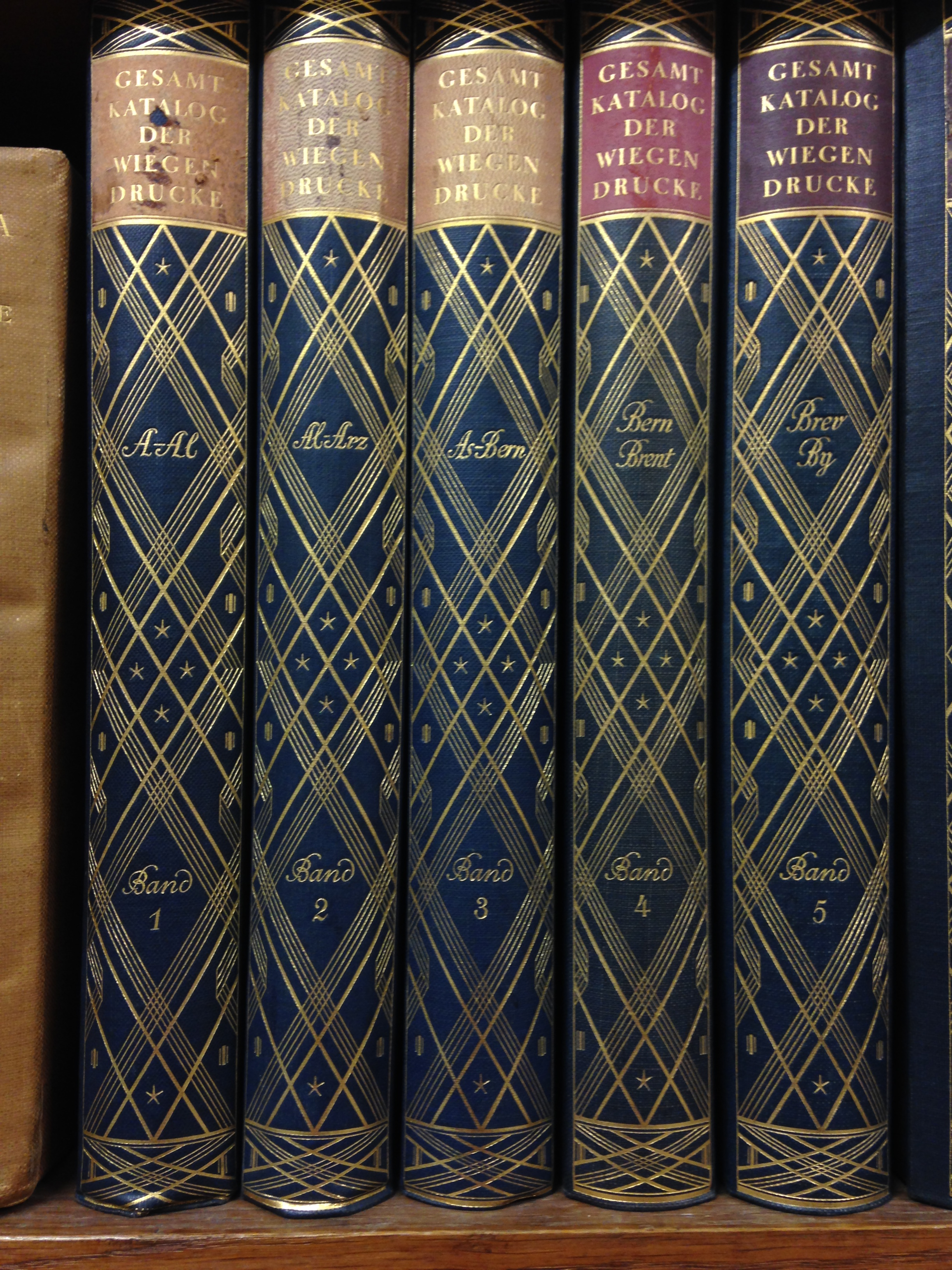
The first five printed volumes of the Gesamtkatalog

Der Gesamtkatalog der Wiegendrucke (English: The Union Catalogue of Incunabula (abbreviated as GW or GKW) is an ongoing project of the Berlin State Library and appears in conjunction with the print edition of the union catalogue of incunabula. The Gesamtkatalog serves as a bibliography or collection of cradle prints or incunabula. The word incunabula stems from the Latin word incunabulum (place of birth or beginning). In the world of books, incunabula refer to books that were printed using metal type up to the year 1500. The work is based on the description of the individual prints, each complete description consists of the bibliographic note, the collation, the description in the narrower sense, the source, and the copy. The database contains all together 36,000 descriptions of incunabula, distributed over at least 3,900 articles. The Gesamtkatalog der Wiegendrucke is available in part in print and in its entirety—in draft form—via an online database.

== Publications ==
Volumes 1–7 of the catalogue were published in Leipzig between 1925 and 1940 by Karl W. Hiersemann; they are now out of print. Volumes 1–7 also have a second edition, which was printed in 1968; these volumes are reprinted without any changes to the content, however, they do include some improvements due to the additions in printing present at the time of reproduction. The further publication of the GW from volume 8 onwards has been resumed by the Berlin State Library since 1972; after a break of more than 30 years and there are now 11 volumes.

== See also ==
- Incunabula Short Title Catalogue
- Preußischer Gesamtkatalog
- Deutscher Gesamtkatalog
