= Jean Brito =

- Jan Brulelou
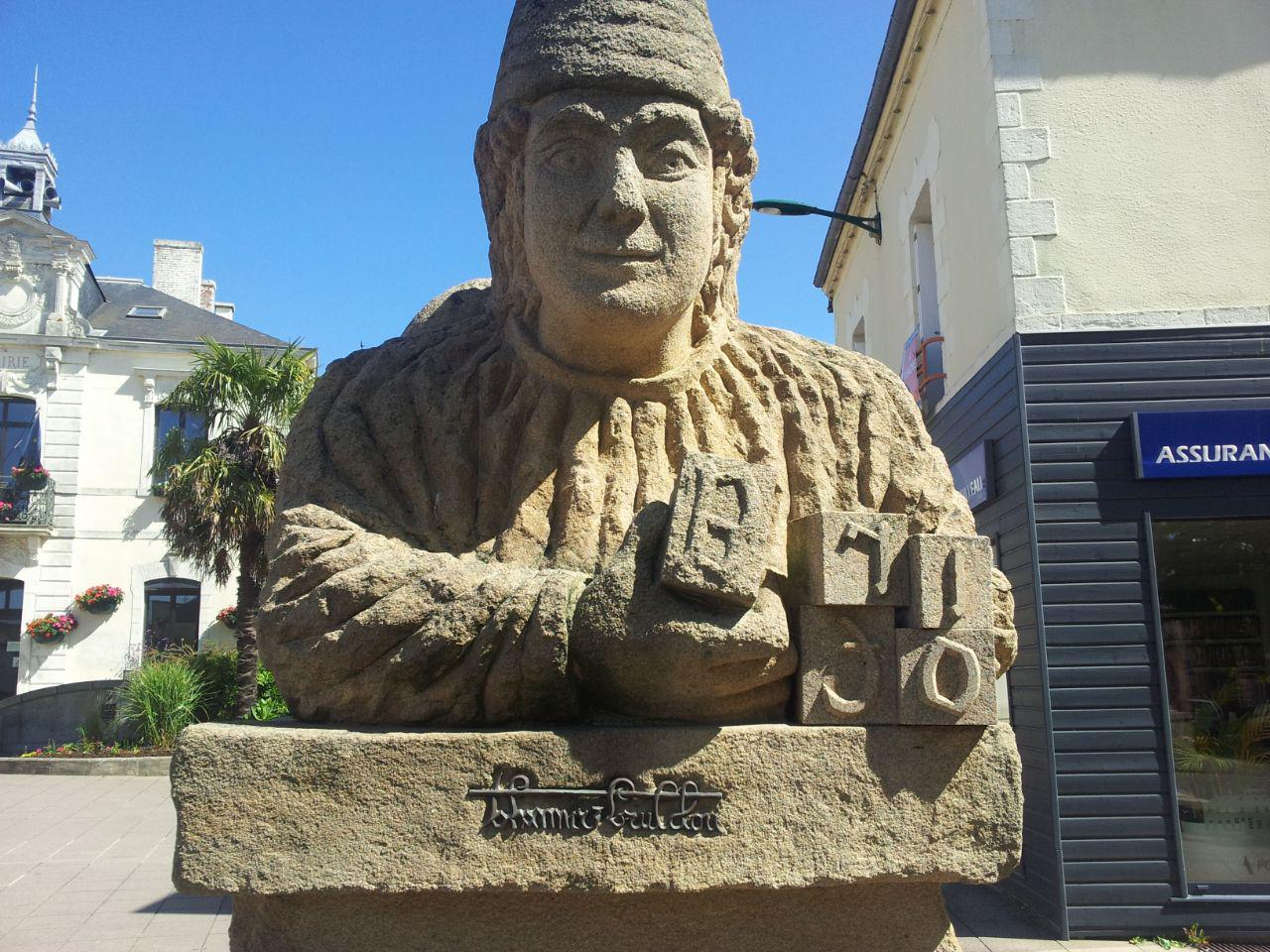
- The statue of Jean Brito at Pipriac
- Born: Pipriac
- Died: Bruges
- Citizenship: Bruges
- Occupations: calligrapher, printer
- Writing career
- Years active: 1455–1483
- Period: 15th-century

Jean Brito or Jan Brulelou (active 1455–1483) was a Breton printer in the Burgundian Netherlands. He was born in Pipriac, a village approximately halfway between Rennes and Nantes. He moved to Tournai where he worked as a calligrapher. Then he moved to Bruges, where he became a printer in the course of the 1470s. In a short verse he refers to himself as a citizen of Bruges.
