= Ulrich Boner =

German-speaking Swiss writer of fable

Fable 57 illustrated in Heidelberg, Universitätsbibliothek Heidelberg, Cod. Pal. germ. 794

Ulrich Boner, or Bonerius (fl. early 14th century), was a German-speaking Swiss writer of fable.

He was born in Bern, descended of an old Bernese family and, as far as can be ascertained, took clerical orders and became a monk; yet as it appears that he subsequently married, it is certain that he received the tonsure only, and was thus entitled to the benefit of the clerici uxoriati, who, on divesting themselves of the clerical garb, could return to secular life. He is mentioned in records between 1324 and 1349, but neither before nor after these dates.

He wrote, in Middle High German, a collection of fables entitled Der Edelstein ('The Jewel') (c. 1349), one hundred in number, which were based principally on those of Avianus (4th century) and the Anonymus Neveleti (edited by Isaac Nicolas Nevelet, 1610). He dedicated this work to the Bernese patrician and poet, Johann von Ringgenberg, advocatus (Vogt) of Brienz (d. c. 1350). It was printed in 1461 at Bamberg by Albrecht Pfister and was one of the first books printed in the German language.

According to the Encyclopædia Britannica Eleventh Edition,

Boner treats his sources with considerable freedom and originality; he writes a clear and simple style, and the necessarily didactic tone of the collection is relieved by touches of humour.

Der Edelstein was edited by GF Benecke (Berlin, 1816) and Franz Pfeiffer (Leipzig, 1844); a translation into modern German by Karl Pannier will be found in Reclams Universal-Bibliothek (Leipzig, 1895). See also GE Lessing in Zur Geschichte und Literatur (Werke, ix.); and Christian Waas, Die Quellen der Beispiele Boners (Giessen, 1897).
