= Incunabula Short Title Catalogue =

Bibliographic database

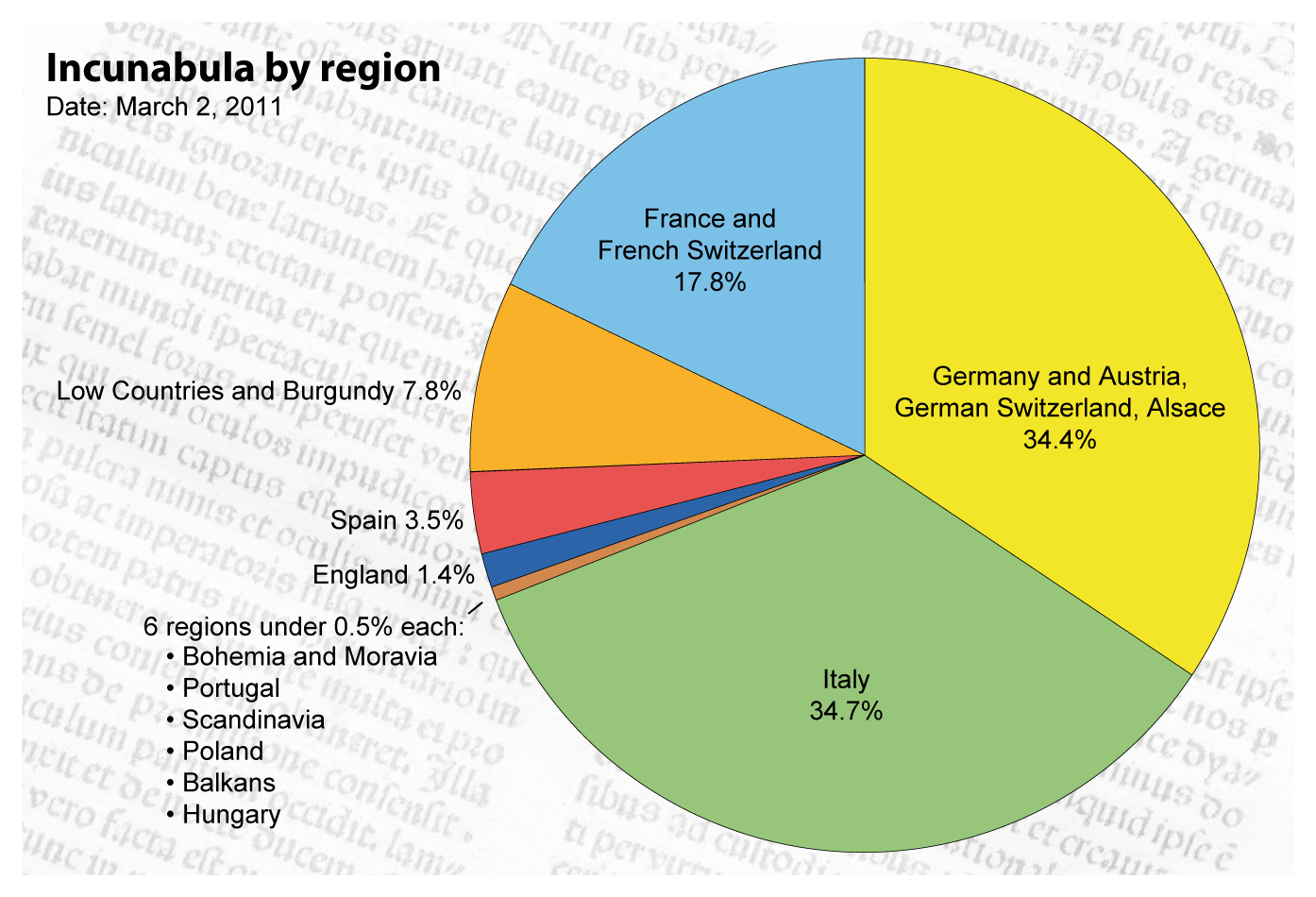
Incunabula in the ISTC by region

The Incunabula Short Title Catalogue (ISTC) is an international, electronic, bibliographic database of 15th-Century European printing. Started by the British Library, it seeks to catalogue all known incunabula. The database lists books by individual editions, recording standard bibliographic details for each edition as well as giving a brief census of known copies, organised by location. It currently holds records of over 30,000 editions. Since 2016, ISTC has been hosted by CERL (Consortium of European Research Libraries).

== History ==
Previous efforts to comprehensively catalog 15th century printing include Georg Wolfgang Panzer's Annales Typographici ab Artis Inventae Origine ad Annum MD (1793–1797) and Ludwig Hain's Repertorium Bibliographicum (1822). Hain's work was later supplemented by Copinger's Supplement and Reichling's Appendices, which would pave the way for the Gesamtkatalog der Wiegendrucke (1925). The Gesamtkatalog der Wiegendrucke (GW) was the most comprehensive catalog of incunables to date (and still offers more in-depth information than ISTC), but in recent decades work on the catalog has slowed to such a degree that the goal of cataloging all extant incunables under the GW's system is indefinitely far-off.

The ISTC was created to establish a system of incunable cataloging that was simple enough to be expanded quickly, bringing the goal of a complete incunable catalog back into focus. Furthermore, the ISTC would use standardized entries that could be entered into a machine-searchable database.

Work on the ISTC began in 1980 under the leadership of the British Library's Lotte Hellinga. Frederick R. Goff's Incunabula in American Libraries (1973) was the first pre-existing catalog to be keyed into ISTC's database. Besides providing the catalog's first 12,900 entries, Goff's system for classifying information about incunables formed the basis for the structure of ISTC's records. Entries for all of the incunables in British Library and the Italian union catalog (IGI) were added next, followed by other national incunable catalogs.

== Records ==
ISTC records retain many characteristics of the records from Goff's census. Each record represents one edition of a work. Information such as author, title, printer, place of printing, year of printing, language, and format is entered into discrete fields to make the records searchable by a computer. Catalogue entries are reduced to a standard form, for ease of indexing and access, which includes the use of standard names for authors and printers—a major issue in an era where the use of Latinised names and vernacular ones interchangeably was common—and contemporary English names for places. Dates are reduced to conventional years where possible.

== Scope and coverage ==
As of October 2024, the ISTC has recorded 30,596 editions, although some of the records included in that number are actually 16th-century works that were included in previous incunable catalogs in error, so the number of true incunabula recorded is 27,460. The number of extant incunabula is estimated to be approximately 28,000 editions, which puts ISTC extraordinarily close to completing its goal of total coverage. Documenting these last few hundred editions is a tremendous undertaking, as the works are scattered in unknown locations in many countries, leaving bibliographers with no organized way to search for them except to "look everywhere".

While the ISTC is unsurpassed in coverage, it does not offer the same level of detail as the Gesamtkatalog der Wiegendrucke or the numerous collection catalogs that are available. Rather, the ISTC complements these resources by providing a searchable index of editions, referring to other catalogs and bibliographies for further detail. ISTC does not include information about individual copies of a work as standard, though a brief census of confirmed locations is provided, and may contain brief notes.

In general, the ISTC only covers extant editions, although records exist for some works that were sufficiently well-documented before being lost to fire or other calamities.

An illustrated edition of the ISTC was made available on CD-ROM in 1998. The addition of illustrations offers important information about a book's layout, format, and printing type. The images represent samples of each text rather than the full text.

== See also ==
- English Short Title Catalogue
- Universal Short Title Catalogue
- VD 16
- VD 17
