= List of fellows of the British Academy elected in the 1970s =

The British Academy consists of world-leading scholars and researchers in the humanities and social sciences. Each year, it elects fellows to its membership. The following were elected in the 1970s.

== 1970 ==
The following were elected to the fellowship at the Academy's annual general meeting in 1970:

- Professor J. N. D. Anderson
- Professor A. H. Armstrong
- Professor Frank Barlow
- Professor C. N. L. Brooke
- Professor Thomas Burrow
- Dr G. H. S. Bushnell
- Dr C. F. Carter
- D. G. Champernowne
- Rev. F. C. Copleston
- J. A. Crook
- J. P. W. Ehrman
- Professor Denys Hay
- M. E. Howard
- Dr M. G. Kendall
- Hon. Sir Robert Megarry
- O. N. Millar
- Professor Kenneth Muir
- Professor Roy Pascal
- D. F. Pears
- Rev. Professor E. G. Rupp
- Dr C. H. V. Sutherland

== 1971 ==
The following were elected to the fellowship at the Academy's annual general meeting in 1971:

- Professor W. S. Allen
- Professor C. R. Bawden
- Professor J. A. W. Bennett
- T. A. M. Bishop
- P. R. L. Brown
- Professor F. L. Carsten
- Professor S. A. de Smith
- Dr M. H. Dobb
- Professor M. I. Finley
- Professor S. S. Frere
- Professor F. J. H. Haskell
- M. B. Hesse
- Rev. Professor J. Kinsley
- Professor W. G. Lambert
- Dr G. Marshall
- Dr J. Needham
- Dr W. F. Oakeshott
- Capt S. W. Roskill, RN (ret.)
- Professor N. Rubinstein
- D. A. F. M. Russell
- Professor L. B. Schapiro
- Professor B. A. O. Williams

== 1972 ==
The following were elected fellows at the annual general meeting in 1972:

- Dr G. E. H. Abraham
- Rev. Professor G. W. Anderson
- Professor A. E. Anton
- Professor A. J. Brown
- Professor D. C. Coleman
- G. E. M. de Ste Croix
- Professor C. Dionisotti-Casalone
- Professor J. H. Elliott
- Dr R. A. Higgins
- Professor A. M. Honoré
- Dr E. R. Leach
- Professor J. H. Le Patourel
- Dr R. M. Ogilvie
- Dr A. J. Taylor
- Professor R. M. Titmuss
- Professor William Watson
- Sir John Wheeler-Bennett
- Professor Elizabeth Wilkinson
- Professor R. A. Wollheim

== 1973 ==
The following were elected fellows at the annual general meeting in 1973:

- Professor Max Beloff
- Professor F. F. Bruce
- Rev. Dr G. B. Caird
- Dr P. T. V. M. Chaplais
- L. J. Cohen
- Professor R. Davis
- Professor E. J. Dobson
- Professor C. R. Dodwell
- Professor J. D. Evans
- Professor J. F. Kermode
- Mary Leakey
- D. M. Lewis
- Professor I. M. D. Little
- Professor John Lyons
- Professor P. N. S. Mansergh
- Dr L. E. R. Picken
- Sir Leon Radzinowicz
- Professor J. C. Smith
- Dr Edmond Sollberger
- Professor Brinley Thomas
- Professor E. O. G. Turville-Petre
- Dr M. L. West
- Dr H. J. Plenderleith (under Supplemental Charter)

== 1974 ==
The following were elected fellows at the annual general meeting in 1974:

- J. G. Beckwith
- Professor R. D. C. Black
- Professor J. M. Cook
- Professor A. D. S. Fowler
- Professor E. A. Gellner
- Dr A. J. P. Kenny
- Professor M. Dominica Legge
- Professor F. S. L. Lyons
- J. L. Mackie
- F. A. Mann
- Rev. Dr E. L. Mascall
- Dr T. B. Mitford
- Professor E. E. D. M. Oates
- Professor D. Obolensky
- Professor H. S. Offler
- Dr Marjorie E. Reeves
- Professor P. G. Stein
- Dr Joan Thirsk
- Professor D. P. Walker

== 1975 ==
The following were elected fellows at the annual general meeting in 1975:

- Professor P. T. Bauer
- Professor A. D. E. Cameron
- Professor J. T. Coppock
- Professor R. H. C. Davis
- W. B. Dean
- Professor R. P. Dore
- Professor Margaret M. Gowing
- Professor F. H. Hahn
- G. D. G. Hall
- Professor P. M. Holt
- Professor Elie Kedourie
- Professor John Lough
- Professor F. R. Palmer
- P. M. R. Pouncey
- Professor R. C. Quirk
- Professor C. B. Ricks
- W. G. Runciman
- Dr J. E. Stevens
- Dame Veronica Wedgwood, OM, DBE
- Dr D. T. Whiteside

== 1976 ==
The following were elected fellows at the annual general meeting in 1976:

- Professor D. M. Arnold
- Professor Robert Auty
- Professor G. E. Aylmer
- D. E. Barrett
- Professor G. W. S. Barrow
- Dr R. L. S. Bruce-Mitford
- Professor Kenneth Cameron
- Professor R. M. Cook
- Professor Gordon Donaldson
- Professor William Empson
- Phillipa R. Foot
- Professor L. W. Forster
- Professor J. R. Goody
- Professor E. J. E. Hobsbawm
- T. G. H. James
- Professor David Lockwood
- Denis Mack Smith
- Professor C. A. Mango
- Professor F. G. B. Millar
- Dr J. C. T. Oates
- Professor D. S. Scott
- Professor John Shearman
- Stefan Strelcyn
- Professor D. M. Walker
- Professor Thomas Wilson

== 1977 ==
The following were elected fellows at the annual general meeting in 1977:

- Dr S. P. Brock
- Professor S. G. Checkland
- Professor I. R. Christie
- Professor J. N. Coldstream
- Professor R. Dahrendorf
- Professor C. J. F. Dowsett
- Professor J. Gottmann
- Professor J. A. G. Griffith
- Professor J. R. Hale
- Professor R. H. Hilton
- Professor J. B. Joll
- Kathleen Major
- Professor P. Mathias
- Dr P. R. S. Moorey
- L. B. Nicolson
- P. J. Parsons
- A. M. Quinton
- Professor P. E. L. Russell
- Professor A. K. Sen
- G. H. Treitel
- Rev. Professor R. McL. Wilson
- Professor B. S. Yamey

== 1978 ==
The following were elected fellows at the annual general meeting in 1978:

- Professor P. S. Atiyah
- Professor R. Browning
- A. R. M. Carr
- Dr M. Chibnall
- Professor N. Cohn
- Dr J. M. Coles
- D. F. Foxon
- Professor J. A. Gallagher
- Professor W. M. Gorman
- Professor A. R. Hall
- Professor J. C. Holt
- Dr C. M. Kraay
- Professor P. E. Lasko
- Professor I. D. McFarlane
- Professor D. M. MacKinnon
- Rev. Professor J. McManners
- Professor A. Nove
- Professor J. K. S. St Joseph
- Dr A. W. Tyson
- Professor D. R. P. Wiggins
- Professor J. E. Caerwyn Williams
- Dr M. Winterbottom

== 1979 ==
The following were elected fellows at the annual general meeting in 1979:

- Professor W. Brass
- Professor I. Brownlie
- Professor B. W. Cunliffe
- Professor R. M. Dworkin
- Professor R. Ellmann
- Rev. Professor J. A. Emerton
- J. A. G. Gere
- Professor C. Grayson
- P. Laslett
- Dr G. L. Lewis
- Professor H. R. Loyn
- Professor A. T. Peacock
- Professor A. M. Snodgrass
- Professor E. L. G. Stones
- Professor C. M. Taylor
- K. V. Thomas
- Professor F. M. L. Thompson
- G. D. N. Worswick
