= List of public lecture series =

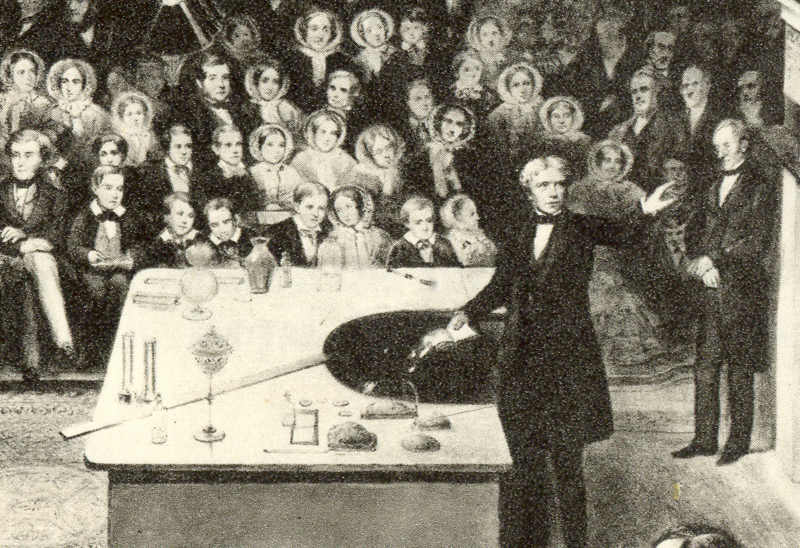
Michael Faraday delivering one of the British Royal Institution Christmas Lectures in 1856.

Recurrent series of notable public lectures are presented in various countries.

== General ==
=== Australia ===
- The Boyer Lectures delivered by prominent Australians, broadcast annually by the Australian Broadcasting Corporation.
- The Errol Solomon Meyers Memorial Lecture, held annually at the University of Queensland in Brisbane.
- The George Ernest Morrison Lecture in Ethnology, held annually at the Australian National University in Canberra.

=== Canada ===
- The Massey Lectures are held at and sponsored by Massey College at the University of Toronto annually
- The Watts Lectures are held several times each year at the University of Toronto Scarborough

=== Denmark ===
- The H.C. Ørsted Lectureship held at and sponsored by The Technical University of Denmark, annually
- Public Lectures in Science (In Danish: Offentlige Foredrag i Naturvidenskab) sponsored by Faculty of Science and Technology, Aarhus University, and held in Vejle, Horsens, Herning and Aarhus.

=== India ===
- Vasant Vyakhyanmala is a traditional annual spring lecture series held in Pune, India, for the last 140 years and hosted by Vaktruttvottejak Sabha.
- NITI (National Institute for Transforming India), India lectures series: Transforming India

=== New Zealand ===
- Victoria University of Wellington public lecture series.

=== United Kingdom ===
- The Dingwall Beloe Lecture Series, held at the British Museum annually, intended to make new contributions to the history of horology, with a particular international focus.
- Gresham College gives free public lectures since it was founded in 1597
- The Reith Lectures, broadcast annually on the BBC, founded in honour of Lord Reith
- The Romanes Lectures, on "any topic in the Arts, Science, or Literature", given annually at the University of Oxford founded by George Romanes
- The Royal Institution Christmas Lectures have presented scientific ideas to young people in an entertaining manner since 1825.

=== United States ===
- The Art, Technology, and Culture (ATC) Lecture Series, at University of California, Berkeley in Berkeley, CA
- The Charles Eliot Norton Lectures at Harvard University, in Cambridge, MA
- Distinctive Voices, sponsored by the National Academy of Sciences, presents lectures on a wide range of scientific and technical topics at the Beckman Center in Irvine, CA and the Jonsson Center in Woods Hole, MA
- The Morgenthau Lectures, at the Carnegie Council in New York
- The Watson Lecture Series, at the California Institute of Technology, which began in 1922, presents lectures on science and engineering from the institute's researchers

== Social and political ==
=== United States ===
- The Irving E. Carlyle Lecture Series at Wake Forest University
- Landon Lecture Series at Kansas State University
- Whizin Center Public Lecture Series at the American Jewish University

== Aeronautics and astronautics ==
=== United States ===
- Evolution of Flight Lecture Series from American Institute of Aeronautics and Astronautics (AIAA)

== Computer science ==
=== Canada ===
- UBC CS Distinguished Lecture Series

=== Greece ===
- Distinguished Lecturer Series - Leon The Mathematician] at School of Informatics, Aristotle University of Thessaloniki

=== United States ===
- CDS Lecture Series at Intelligent Servosystems Laboratory, Institute for Systems Research at University of Maryland, College Park
- MURL Lecture Series at Multi-University/Research Laboratory (MURL) as a group of institutions:
  - School of Computer Science, Carnegie Mellon University;
  - Laboratory for Computer Science, Massachusetts Institute of Technology;
  - Microsoft Research;
  - School of Engineering, Stanford University;
  - Dept. of Computer Science, University of Washington; and
  - Xerox Palo Alto Research Center.

== History and humanities ==
=== United Kingdom ===
- Caird Medal lecture series at the National Maritime Museum
- E. A. Lowe Lectures, given triennially at Corpus Christi College, University of Oxford, on palaeography
- Ford Lectures, given annually at Oxford University on British history
- Lyell Lectures, given annually at Oxford University on the history of the book or bibliography
- McKenzie Lectures, given annually at Oxford University on the history of the book, scholarly editing, textual criticism, or bibliography
- Panizzi Lectures, given annually at the British Library on a topic in bibliography or book history
- Sandars Lectures, given annually at Cambridge University on a topic in bibliography or book history
- Lees Knowles Lectures, given annually military history at Trinity College, Cambridge
- Raleigh Lectures on History at the British Academy, London, England,
- Black History for Action at Lambeth Town Hall, London, England.
- Keynes Lectures in Economics at the British Academy, London, England.

=== United States ===
- A. W. Mellon Lectures in the Fine Arts
- Alice G. Smith Lecture, University of South Florida
- Chicago Humanities Festival
- Columbia Lectures in International Studies
- James Ford Bell Lecture
- Jefferson Lecture
- Massey Lectures
- Sigmund H. Danziger Jr. Memorial Lecture in the Humanities

=== Hungary ===
- Eötvös József Lecture

=== The Netherlands ===
- Nexus Lectures since 1994
- Mosse Lectures, given annually in Amsterdam

== Journalism and media studies ==
=== United States ===
- Robert C. Vance Distinguished Lecture Series at Central Connecticut State University

== Law ==
=== United Kingdom ===
- Hamlyn Lectures

== Mathematics and mathematical sciences ==
=== United Kingdom ===
- Sir David Wallace Lecture Series at Loughborough University

=== United States ===
- Spring Lecture Series at University of Arkansas

== Neurosciences and mind/brain sciences ==
=== Australia ===
- The Melbourne Neuroscience Public Lecture Series at The Melbourne Neuroscience Institute, University of Melbourne

=== Canada ===
- Treva Glazebrook Lecture Series at University of Western Ontario

=== United States ===
- CSHL Adult Lectures at Cold Spring Harbor Laboratory
- Contemporary Neurology and Neuroscience Evening Lecture Series at Department of Neurology, University of California, Irvine
- Cognitive Neuroscience Lecture Series at Center for Neural Science|the Center for Neural Science, New York University
- Duke Neurobiology Lecture Series at Department of Neurobiology, Duke University Medical Center
- Frontiers in Neuroscience Lecture Series by the Graduate Program in Neuroscience, Emory University
- Gardner Murphy Memorial Lecture Series by the American Society for Psychical Research
- HHMI's Neuroscience Lecture Series at Howard Hughes Medical Institute
- IHF Distinguished Lecture Series on Brain, Learning and Memory at Irvine Health Foundation
- Interdisciplinary Seminar at Oklahoma Center for Neuroscience (OCNS)
- Distinguished Lecturer Series at UC Davis M.I.N.D. Institute
- Mind, Brain and Behavior Distinguished Lecture Series at Center for Cognitive Neurosciences, Duke University
- Mind/Brain Lecture Series at Swartz Foundation
- MNIF Public Lecture Series at Montana Neuroscience Institute Foundation
- Neuroscience Lecture Series at University of Wisconsin–Madison
- NRC Lecture Series at Neuroscience Research Center, University of Texas Health Science Center at Houston
- NUIN Lecture Series at the Northwestern University Institute for Neuroscience
- Pinkel Endowed Lecture Series at Institute for Research in Cognitive Science, University of Pennsylvania
- Wyeth Distinguished Lecture Series in Behavioral Neuroscience at Rutgers University
- Yerkes Neuroscience Lecture Series by Neuroscience Division, Yerkes National Primate Research Center

== Physics ==
=== Australia ===
- Public lectures in physics at University of Melbourne

=== Canada ===
- Perimeter Institute's Public Lecture Series at Perimeter Institute

=== United Kingdom ===
- Sir Nevill Mott Lecture Series at Loughborough University

=== United States ===
- Fermilab Lecture Series at Fermilab
- Henry Norris Russell Lectureship before the American Astronomical Society
- Jansky Lectureship before the National Radio Astronomy Observatory
- Leon Pape Memorial Lecture Series at California State University at Los Angeles
- Lyman Parratt Lecture Series at Cornell University
- Theodore von Kármán Lecture Series at Jet Propulsion Laboratory (JPL)
- Richtmyer Memorial Award Lectureship, by the American Association of Physics Teachers

== Medical sciences ==
=== Italy ===
- Giuseppe Bigi Memorial Lecture Series, Milan

== Science ==
=== Spain ===
- Program ConCiencia at the University of Santiago de Compostela
