= Kirsop =

Kirsop is a surname. Notable people with the surname include:

- Wallace Kirsop (born 1933), Australian academic
- William Kirsop (1891–1960), English footballer
