= Malcolm Parkes =

British paleographer

Malcolm Beckwith Parkes FSA FBA (26 June 1930 – 10 May 2013), credited as an author as M. B. Parkes, was an English paleographer, notable for his contributions to the scholarship of medieval manuscripts. His studies of the manuscripts of Geoffrey Chaucer and William Langland were especially important, and his 1978 article "The Production of Copies of the 'Canterbury Tales'" was described as "seminal".

== Life and work ==
Parkes was a student of Neil Ripley Ker and wrote his BLitt degree thesis on the secretary hand. From 1964 to 1971, he was a lecturer in the English faculty of the university, and from 1965 to 1997 he was a fellow at Keble College, Oxford, and, after Neil Ker's retirement, university reader in palaeography, a post he held from 1993 to 1996; he latterly held a personal chair in palaeography in the University of Oxford from 1996. At Keble, he taught Old and Middle English language and literature.

Among his important individual achievements are the dating of the Oxford MS. of The Song of Roland and his work on early manuscripts of the Canterbury Tales (with Ian Doyle), still considered a standard. His 1969 book English Cursive Book Hands, 1250–1500 is "the authoritative account", according to David Ganz, and its terminology is still employed by other scholars. His work on punctuation (Pause and Effect: an Introduction to the History of Punctuation in the West, 1993) focuses on "visual reading aids" and was highly influential. His Lyell Lectures at Oxford discussed the prosopography of English scribes and focussed on how they wrote, rather than on terms for identifying scripts, and proved him an erudite and entertaining lecturer. His books have glossaries which demonstrate how precisely he used language. He compiled a catalogue of Keble College's medieval manuscripts which was published in 1979 by Scolar Press, London.

Parkes was elected to the Comité international de paléographie latine in 1986 and was a corresponding fellow of the Medieval Academy of America from 1992. He died on 10 May 2013.
