= Joyce Pelgrim =

English stationer and printer

Joyce Pelgrim (fl. 1504–c.1526) was an English stationer and printer.

== Life ==
Very little is known about his early life. Most of the details about his life are known from the works of Edward Gordon Duff, who also wrote the article about him in the Dictionary of National Biography.

== Career ==
Pelgrim was known not only for printing books but also as an astute bookseller, active in St. Paul's Churchyard between 1506 and 1510. He received patronage from William Bretton, a wealthy English merchant.

He collaborated with Henry Jacobi and Wolfgang Hopyl.

== Bibliography ==
Pelgrim's notable books include:

- Ortus Vocabulorum.

It was printed for him in Paris, in 1504.
