= Alan Bishop (disambiguation) =

Alan Bishop may refer to:

- Alan Bishop, American musician
- Alan J. Bishop (1937–2023), British-Australian mathematics education researcher
- Alan R. Bishop, British physicist and academic
- Alan W. Bishop (1920–1988), British geotechnical engineer and academic
- T. A. M. Bishop (Terence Alan Martyn Bishop; 1907–1994), British palaeographer and historian
