= Kathleen L. Scott =

American codicologist

Academic background
- Education: University of California, Berkeley

Academic work
- Discipline: Codicology
- Institutions: University of Massachusetts Amherst

Kathleen L. Scott is a codicologist specialising in 15th-century English manuscripts. An independent scholar, she is associated with the University of Massachusetts.

== Education and career ==
Scott holds an AB from Colorado College, and an MA and PhD from the University of California, Berkeley. From 1990–92 she was adjunct professor at the Center for Integrative Studies, Michigan State University. Although an independent scholar, she is associated with the University of Massachusetts, and played an instrumental role in the founding the Massachusetts Center for the Book which was established “under the auspices of the Library of Congress … to support the state’s writers and publishers, and sponsor activities to promote literacy and the love of books and reading”. In 2004, Scott delivered the prestigious Lyell Lectures at the University of Oxford; a revised version of her address was subsequently published as Tradition and Innovation in Later Medieval English Manuscripts.

== Awards ==
A National Endowment for the Humanities award recipient, Scott has won fellowships from the Fulbright, Woodrow Wilson, and Getty Grant Programmes, as well as the Guggenheim Foundation. In 1997, she was named a recipient of the British Academy’s Neil Ker Memorial Fund, which promotes the study of western, and especially British, medieval manuscripts. The following year, the Modern Language Association awarded her their inaugural Prize for Distinguished Bibliography (for Later Gothic Manuscripts, 1390–1490). In 2009, a volume of scholarly essays was published in her honour.

== Personal life ==
She is married to David K. Scott, former Chancellor of the University of Massachusetts Amherst (1993 to 2001).

== Selected publications ==
Authored books

- 1976: The Caxton Master and His Patrons. Preface by J.A.W. Bennett. Cambridge: Cambridge Bibliographical Society.
- 1981: The Mirroure of the Worlde: MS. Bodley 283 (England c. 1470–1480): The Physical Composition, Decoration, and Illustration. Oxford: Roxburghe Club.
- 1996: Later Gothic Manuscripts, 1390–1490. 2 vols. London: Harvey Miller. A Survey of Manuscripts Illuminated in the British Isles 6.
- 2002: Dated and Datable English Manuscript Borders, c.1395–1499. London: British Library.
- 2007: Tradition and Innovation in Later Medieval English Manuscripts. London: British Library.

Edited volumes

- 1992: (with Derek Pearsall). Piers Plowman: A Facsimile of Bodleian Library, Oxford, MS Douce 104. Cambridge: D.S. Brewer.
- 1995: (with Carol Garrett Fisher). Art into Life: Collected Papers from the Kresge Art Museum Medieval Symposia. East Lansing: Michigan State University Press.
- 2000: An Index of Images in English Manuscripts: From the Time of Chaucer to Henry VIII, c.1380–c.1509. London: Harvey Miller.

Book chapters and articles

- 1968: “A Mid-Fifteenth-Century English Illuminating Shop and Its Customers”. Journal of the Warburg and Courtauld Institutes 31: 170–96. DOI: 10.2307/750640.
- 1982: “Lydgate’s Lives of Saints Edmund and Fremund: A Newly-Located Manuscript in Arundel Castle”. Viator 13: 335–66. DOI: 10.1484/J.VIATOR.2.301475.
- 1997: “Instructions to a Limner in Beinecke MS 223”. Yale University Library Gazette 72.1–2: 13–16.
- 2002: “Four Early Fifteenth-Century English Manuscripts of the Speculum Humanae Salvationis and a Fourteenth-Century Exemplar”. English Manuscript Studies 1100–1700. Vol. 10. ISSN 0957-8080.
- 2010: “Mnemonic Aspects of Illustration in Later English Manuscripts”. Manuscripta 54.1: 49–63. DOI: 10.1484/J.MSS.1.100787.
