= Peter Anthony Newton =

British academic and collector

Peter Anthony Newton (1935–1987) was a British academic and collector specialising in medieval stained glass.

== Education ==
Newton studied history of art at the Courtauld Institute. He then held a research fellowship at the Barber Institute at the Birmingham in 1961. He was awarded his doctorate in 1961 for his dissertation Schools of glass painting in the Midlands 1275–1430.

== Academic career ==
Newton was appointed Mellon Lecturer in British Medieval Art at the University of York in 1965, the first experienced specialist to teach medieval stained glass at the university level. His obituary in the Journal of Stained Glass noted that he "applied modern methodologies of art history and iconography to stained glass which meant that, for the first time, English medieval glass-painting was examined systematically as a branch of medieval art in its own right". During his time at York, Newton worked to establish the Wormald Library as a memorial to his former tutor, Francis Wormald.

Newton became a member of the governing committee of the York Art Gallery, "served [York] Minster as academic adviser to the York Glaziers’ Trust, and exerted influence on glass conservation more widely through his involvement with the stained glass committee of the Central Council for the Care of Churches." His obituary noted the value of his expertise in identifying stained glass during the restoration of 12th and 14th century glass in the Minster's nave clerestory. In his will, published after his death in 1987, he left his collection to the library of the university on the condition that this material was kept together in the King's Manor Library.

== Selected works ==
- Peter A. Newton and Jill Kerr. The County of Oxford: A catalogue of medieval stained glass. Corpus vitrearum Medii Aevi. London: Oxford University Press for the British Academy, 1979. ISBN 0-19-725970-7
