= John Simon Gabriel Simmons =

British scholar of Slavonics (1915–2005)

John Simon Gabriel Simmons OBE (8 July 1915 – 21 September 2005) was a British scholar of Slavonics.

== Early years ==
John Simmons was born in Birmingham, England, in 1915. He joined the library at Birmingham University as a "library boy" in 1932, and in 1934 began to study Russian under Professor Konovalov. He graduated in 1937 with a BA in Spanish and Russian, but chose to stay on at the university as an assistant librarian, beginning a DPhil on the history of Russian printing. This was interrupted by the outbreak of World War II. On his first trip to Russia, he met his wife, Fanny, whom he married in 1944.

== Adult life ==
After service in World War II and three more years at Birmingham University, Simmons moved to Oxford after an invitation to take up a job as librarian/lecturer in charge of Slavonic books at Oxford University. This position was created for him by his old tutor Konovalov. Due to his actions in August 1953, when he travelled to Moscow to propose to the director of the Lenin Library a book exchange, the University received thousands of valuable, out-of-print Russian publications.

Simmons was instrumental in building up the retrospective collections of Russian books in the Taylorian and Bodleian Libraries and the creation in the Bodleian of the only specialised Slavonic reading room in the country. He believed that it was these library collections along with a group of Russian academic teachers recruited by Serge Konovalov, Maurice Bowra, and Isaiah Berlin, that led to the establishment of Oxford as the only centre for Slavonic studies in England.

== Later years ==
John Simmons remained an important figure in the field of Slavonics right to his death in September 2005. In 1974 he held the Sandars Readership in Bibliography at Cambridge University--still the only serious English-language history of Russian printing.

In 1985 he formed an institution named The 4Cs Club. The '4 Cs' stood for his four 'categoricals': Conserve, Consider, Contribute, Co-operate. Invitations were given out to scholars that he deemed similar to himself in attitude to learning. The members of the club (who now number over 200 in 19 countries) were given club ties (brooches for women were introduced at a later date) and encouraged to wear them on important occasions.
