= Donald McKenzie (academic) =

New Zealander bibliographer and literary scholar

Donald Francis McKenzie, FBA (5 June 1931 – 22 March 1999) was a New Zealand bibliographer and literary scholar. He was professor of bibliography and textual criticism at the University of Oxford from 1989 to 1996.

== Early life and education ==
Born in Timaru, New Zealand, the son of a bootmaker, McKenzie was educated at various schools, the last being Palmerston North Boys' High School, before joining the New Zealand Post Office in 1948. He continued his studies part-time at Victoria University College, Wellington (BA 1954; DipJourn 1955; MA 1957) and briefly taught at the institution, before obtaining a scholarship to Corpus Christi College, Cambridge, where he graduated with a PhD in 1961. Initially he researched the working conditions of printers in the age of Shakespeare under the supervision of Philip Gaskell but abandoned that topic in favour of a study of early printing presses, specifically Cambridge's presses.

== Career ==
McKenzie's research on the archives of Cambridge University Press led to the publication of The Cambridge University Press, 1696–1712: A Bibliographical Study (2 vols., 1966).

Returning to Victoria University College (which became the Victoria University of Wellington in 1961) in 1960, McKenzie held a succession of academic posts before being appointed professor of English language and literature in 1969.

He founded the Wai-te-ata Press at Victoria University in 1962 to teach students all elements of book printing and production and to print the work of local authors such as Alistair Campbell and Bill Manhire. He was one of the founders of Downstage Theatre in Wellington and published music scores with composer Douglas Lilburn.

In 1986, he was appointed reader in textual criticism at the University of Oxford in succession to David Foxon, also becoming a professorial fellow of Pembroke College, Oxford the same year. In 1989, he was appointed professor of bibliography and textual criticism at Oxford. He retired in 1996, becoming supernumerary fellow of Pembroke College.

== Awards ==
McKenzie gave the Sandars Lectures at Cambridge in 1976 and the Lyell Lectures in Oxford in 1988, exploring the 17th century book trade.

In 1985 he delivered the first Panizzi Lectures at the British Library on "Bibliography and the Sociology of Texts". He was elected a Corresponding Fellow of the British Academy in 1980 and a Fellow in 1986. He was elected an Honorary Fellow of the Australian Academy of the Humanities in 1988, and was awarded the gold medal of the Bibliographical Society in 1990.

In 1997 he received an Honorary Doctorate from Victoria University of Wellington.

== Personal life ==
McKenzie married Dora Haig and they had one son. They divorced in 1989 and he married Christine Ferdinand in 1994.

== Legacy ==
The McKenzie Lectures in Oxford were established in his honour. In New Zealand an annual D.F. McKenzie Memorial Lecture, co-hosted by Wai-te-ata Press, is given. Victoria University also established a scholarship named the D.F. McKenzie Award for MA or PhD students.

== Selected publications ==
- Congreve, William, D. F. McKenzie, and C. Y. Ferdinand. 2011. The Works of William Congreve. Oxford: Oxford University Press.
- McKenzie, Donald Francis. 2010. Cambridge University Press, 1696-1712 : A Bibliographical Study. Volume 2. Cambridge: Cambridge University Press.
- McKenzie, Donald Francis, and Maureen Bell. 2008. A Chronology and Calendar of Documents Relating to the London Book Trade, 1641-1700. Reprinted. Oxford: Oxford University Press.
- McKenzie, D. F., and British Library. n.d. Bibliography and the Sociology of Texts. 1986. London: British Library.
- Ackers, Charles, and Oxford Bibliographical Society. 1968. A Ledger of Charles Ackers: Printer of the London Magazine. Edited by D. F. McKenzie and J. C. Ross. [Oxford]: Published for the Oxford Bibliographical Society by the Oxford University Press.
- McKenzie, Donald Francis. 1966. Cambridge University Press, 1696 -1712: A Bibliographical Study. Volume 1. Cambridge: Cambridge University Press.
