= Seymour de Ricci =

Bibliographer and historian

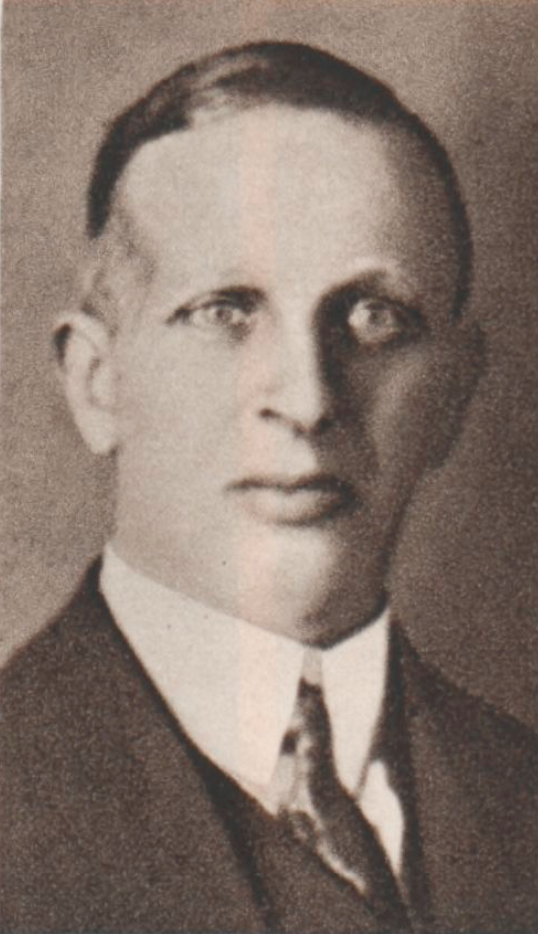
Seymour De Ricci

Seymour de Ricci (1881-1942) was a bibliographer and historian, who was born in England and raised and became a citizen of France.

== Early years ==
Seymour Montefiore Robert Rosso de Ricci was born in 1881 in Twickenham, United Kingdom. His parents were Helen Montefiore (c. 1860–1931) and James Herman de Ricci (1847–1900). He lived with his mother in Paris after 1890, when his parents divorced. His father was a colonial judge and a lawyer.

== Education and career ==
Between 1890 and 1898, de Ricci attended the Lycée Janson de Sailly. He attended and subsequently received his bachelier ès lettres from École pratique des hautes études, Sorbonne in 1897. He went to Côtes-du-Nord, Brittany where he studied Roman inscriptions. He met Salomon Reinach, who would be a close friend and mentor, and Émile Guimet. He took an inventory of the inscriptions and published his first book about them in 1897. In 1901 he received his licence. He was a private scholar of epigraphy, Egyptology and bibliography.

In 1929 he held the Sandars Readership in Bibliography at Cambridge University.

== Personal life and the war ==
De Ricci became a French citizen in 1901. He married Jenny Gabrielle Thérèse Dreyfus about 1902. She was born about 1886 and died about 1938.

During World War I, he was a French Army second-class chasseur à pied. He was an interpreter for the British later in the war. After the war, de Ricci divorced Jenny and he married Delphine Levy Feher in 1920. She was born about 1886 and died about 1977.

== Death ==
De Ricci died in Suresnes, near Paris, France in 1942.

== Publications ==
A selection of de Ricci's works include the following:

=== Sole author ===
- Seymour De Ricci (1969). A Bibliography of Shelley's Letters. B. Franklin. ISBN 978-0-8337-2979-8.
- Seymour De Ricci (January 2010). A Census of Caxtons. General Books LLC. ISBN 978-1-151-95867-9.
- Seymour De Ricci (December 2012). A Checklist of the More Important French Illustrated Books of the Eighteenth Century. Literary Licensing, LLC. ISBN 978-1-258-52350-3.
- Seymour De Ricci (3 February 2011). English Collectors of Books and Manuscripts: (1530-1930) and Their Marks of Ownership. Cambridge University Press. ISBN 978-0-521-15646-2.
- Seymour de Ricci (1920). A foreword about the rare artistic properties collected by the connoisseur Raoul Tolentino (35 pages). American art association.
- Seymour de Ricci (1913). Louis XVI Furniture. Hoffmann.
- Seymour de Ricci (1923). The Roederer Library of French books, prints and drawings of the eighteenth century. The Rosenbach Company.

=== Co-author ===
- John Lewis Clawson; Seymour de Ricci (1924). A Catalogue of Early English Books in the Library of John L. Clawson: Buffalo. Rosenbach Company.
- Seymour de Ricci; W.J. Wilson (1935). Census of Medieval and Renaissance Manuscripts in the United States and Canada. H.W. Wilson. hdl:2027/heb.05703.0001.001.
- Henry Cohen; Seymour de Ricci (August 2011). Guide de L'Amateur de Livres À Gravures Du Xviiie Siècle. BiblioBazaar. ISBN 978-1-175-97439-6.
- Raoul Tolentino; Seymour de Ricci (1920). Catalogue of the Rare Artistic Properties Collected by the Connoisseur Signor Raoul Tolentino. American Art Association.

=== Digitized notes ===
Notes from de Ricci have been digitized for an online database, Seymour de Ricci Bibliotheca Britannica Manuscripta Digitized Archive. The notes, at the University of London's Senate House Library, had been intended for publishing of Bibliotheca Britannica Manuscripta, which was not completed. They had been originally bequeathed to the Historical Research in London in the form of more than 60,000 index cards.
