= Simon Nowell-Smith =

English book collector

Simon Harcourt Nowell-Smith (January 5, 1909 - March 28, 1996) was a British writer, collector and librarian.

== Education ==
Nowell-Smith graduated from Sherborne School in 1928 where he edited The Shirburnian and New College, University of Oxford in 1932.

== Career ==
He served on the editorial staff of The Times from 1932 to 1944 and was assistant editor, Times Literary Supplement, 1937 to 1939.

During World War II Nowell-Smith served in the Naval Intelligence Unit.

He was Secretary and Librarian at the London Library from 1950 to 1956 and Secretary of the Hospital Library Services Survey 1958–1959.

He was President of the Bibliographical Society 1962–1964.

In 1965–1966 he was the Lyell Lecturer in Bibliography at the University of Oxford where he spoke on "International Copyright Law and the Publisher in the Reign of Queen Victoria."

He was a trustee of Dove Cottage from 1974 to 1982.

== Book collecting ==
Nowell-Smith assembled collections of Henry James (now at McMaster University) and Robert Bridges (now at the University of South Carolina). The focus of the ‘Ewelme Collection’, named after the Oxford village where he lived, was 19th- and early 20th-century poetry.

Nowell-Smith was elected to the Roxburghe Club in 1979.

A bibliographic essay in The Book Collector in 1989 described and documented Nowell-Smith's collecting and his writing, including pseudegrapha as "Michael Trevanian of Erewhon."

== Selected publications ==
- Nowell-Smith, Simon, and Robert Browning. (1971). Poetry and Prose: Selected by S. Nowell-Smith. Oxford University Press.
- Nowell-Smith, Simon. (1969). T.J. Wise as Bibliographer. London: Bibliographical Society.
- Nowell-Smith, Simon. University of Oxford. (1968). International Copyright Law and the Publisher in the Reign of Queen Victoria. Oxford: Clarendon Press.
- Nowell-Smith, Simon. (1967). Letters to Macmillan, Selected and Ed. by Simon Nowell-Smith: London, Melbourne, Toronto: Macmillan: New. York: St. Martin.
- Nowell-Smith, Simon. (1964). Edwardian England: 1901-1914. London: Oxford University Press.
- Munford, William Arthur, Simon Nowell-Smith, Cecil Bernard Oldman, and University College, London School of Librarianship and Archives. (1958). English Libraries, 1800-1850; Three Lectures Delivered at University College, London. London: Lewis.
- Nowell-Smith, Simon. (1958). The House of Cassell, 1848-1958. London: Cassell & Company.
- Nowell-Smith, Simon. (1947). The Legend of the Master, Henry James. Oxford Oxfordshire: Oxford University Press.
- Nowell-Smith, Simon. 1933. In Defence of Thackeray. London: Constable.
