= Philip Gaskell =

British bibliographer and librarian (1926–2001)

Philip Gaskell (6 January 1926 – 31 July 2001) was a British bibliographer and librarian.

== Life ==
He was born on 6 January 1926 in Highgate, London, the son of John Wellesley Gaskell, director of an engineering company, and his wife, Olive Elizabeth Baker, who was a Quaker. He was educated at the Dragon School, Oxford, and at Oundle School. In 1947, after army service, he went to King's College, Cambridge, and studied English under Dadie Rylands.

At Glasgow University, Gaskell worked from 1962 as keeper of the early books in the library, and master of Wolfson Hall. He then served as librarian and fellow of Trinity College, Cambridge. He was at Trinity and the Wren Library from 1967 to retirement in 1986, initially a period of the Library's reconstruction. He held the Sandars Readership in Bibliography in 1978–1979. He lectured on Trinity College Library: The First 150 Years.

Gaskell later taught as a visitor at Caltech during the period 1983–1988, while investigating the possible application of bibliographical techniques to film. His pupils included Donald Francis McKenzie, professor of English at Victoria University, Wellington, New Zealand, then Oxford, and James Mosley, librarian of the St Bride printing library.

Gaskell died at Mawgan-in-Meneage, Cornwall, on 31 July 2001.

== Bibliographic Press ==
In 1953, Gaskell followed the suggestion made in 1913 by R. B. McKerrow and founded a bibliographic press in the basement of King's College, Cambridge. He named it the Water Lane Press and documented its first two years of activity in the Transactions of the Cambridge Bibliographical Society.

This press fell into abeyance as Gaskell's interests were focussed elsewhere, until 1974 when he was able to re-establish bibliographical printing in the new Morison Room of the Cambridge University Library. Classes on historical printing techniques have been taught there every year since 1974.

== Works ==
Gaskell's books included an updating and replacement of Ronald Brunlees McKerrow's Introduction to Bibliography. According to The Guardian newspaper,

his New Introduction To Bibliography (1972, latest revision 1985) was revolutionary in treating the object of bibliography as not just the text but all the processes that had gone into making it. It has become a classic, used all over the world.

He was also noted for a pioneering bibliography of the 18th-century Birmingham printer, John Baskerville, published in 1959 (2nd edition 1973). It followed a 1951 bibliography of the poet William Mason. He also produced a bibliography of the Foulis press in 1964. Other works were:

- Standard Written English: A Guide
- Landmarks in English Literature
- From Writer to Reader: Studies in Editorial Method
- Landmarks in Classical Literature
- Morvern Transformed (1968)
