= Toshiyuki Takamiya =

Japanese academic and author

- Born: 23 February 1944 (age 82); Tokyo, Japan
- Education: BA (Economics), Keio University, BA and MA (English Literature), Keio University
- Occupations: Professor Emeritus at Keio University, Antiquarian book collector
- Notable work: Author, co-editor: Aspects of Malory, 1981. Co-editor: Medieval English Studies Past and Present, 1990. Co-Author: New Science Out of Old Books: Studies in Manuscripts and Early Printed Books, 1995; Chaucer in Perspective, 1999.

Toshiyuki Takamiya (高宮利行, Takamiya Toshiyuki; born 23 February 1944) FSA is a Japanese academic and author. He is an authority on medieval English literature and medieval English manuscript studies and a collector of antiquarian books. As Director of Keio University's Humanities Media Interface Project (HUMI) he has led the digital documentation, facsimile reproduction, and distribution of many medieval books and manuscripts including the Gutenberg Bible and Chaucer's Canterbury Tales. He is an Emeritus Professor at Keio University since 2009.

== Early life and education ==
Takamiya was born in Tokyo in 1944, but his family relocated to Hokkaido due to the war. Takamiya graduated from Keio University with a BA in Economics in 1966 and subsequently studied at the same university for both a BA and MA in English Literature, graduating in 1968 and 1970 respectively.

== Academic research and professional positions ==
Under Takamiya's direction, the HUMI team at Keio University has made digital reproductions of sixteen sets of the Gutenberg Bible at seven institutions, including in 2000, both full-text facsimiles held in the collection of the British Library. The high resolution images have facilitated comparative bibliographical research on early movable type printing methods and are available for public access on the respective library websites.

Since 1986 Takamiya has been a Fellow of the Society of Antiquaries of London. Professor Takamiya has been awarded honorary degrees by the University of Sheffield (1998) and the University of Glasgow (2011). From 2000 to 2004 Takamiya served as a trustee of the New Chaucer Society. Takiyama held The Sandars Readership in Bibliography at Cambridge University in 2016-2017.

In 2004 a festschrift was published in his honour: The Medieval Book and a Modern Collector: essays in honour of Toshiyuki Takamiya. Cambridge: D. S. Brewer ISBN 978-1-84384-405-1.

== Loan and sale to the Beinecke Library ==
In 2013, Takamiya deposited on longterm loan his private collection of rare medieval books and manuscripts at Yale University's Beinecke Rare Book & Manuscript Library. Assembled over 40 years, the collection includes 51 items, including three copies of Chaucer's The Canterbury Tales, a copy of Chaucer's A Treatise on the Astrolabe, and several Wycliffe's Bibles. In 2017, the Beinecke Library acquired the collection by purchase.
