= Houghton Library =

Library of Harvard University

Coordinates: 42°22′23.5″N 71°06′57.4″W

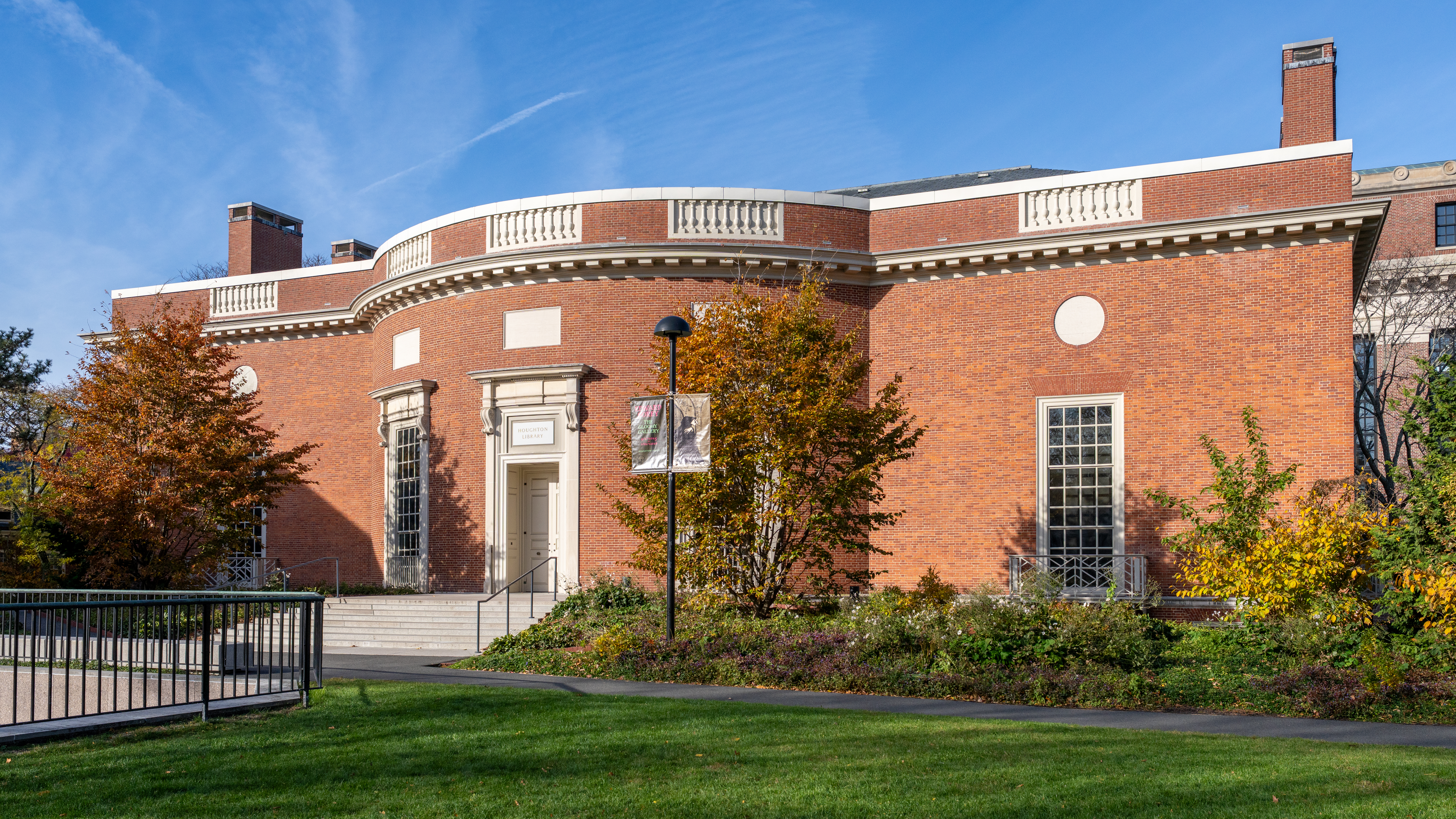
- Location: Cambridge, Massachusetts, United States
- Type: University library
- Established: 28 February 1942
- Branch of: Harvard University Library

Other information
- Website: https://library.harvard.edu/libraries/houghton

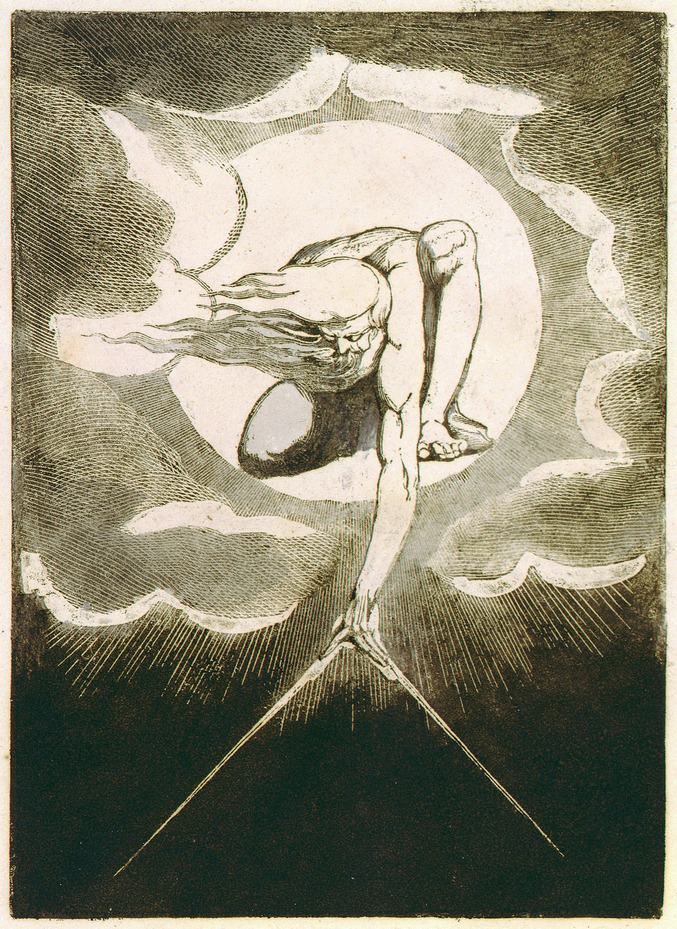
The Ancient of Days in Europe a Prophecy by William Blake, 1795, copy H

Houghton Library, on the south side of Harvard Yard adjacent to Widener Library, Lamont Library, and Loeb House, is Harvard University's primary repository for rare books and manuscripts. It is part of the Harvard College Library, the library system of Harvard's Faculty of Arts and Sciences. The collections of Houghton Library include the Harvard Theatre Collection and the Woodberry Poetry Room, as well as the personal papers and archives of major American and English writers.

== History ==
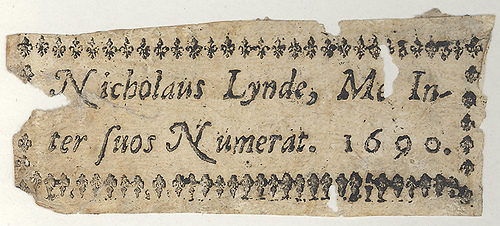

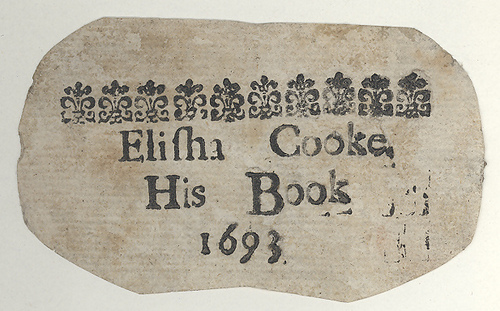
Bookplates from the Houghton collection

Harvard's first special collections library began as the Treasure Room of Gore Hall in 1908. The Treasure Room moved to the newly built Widener Library in 1915. In 1938, looking to supply Harvard's most valuable holdings with more space and improved storage conditions, Harvard College Librarian Keyes DeWitt Metcalf made a series of proposals which eventually led to the creation of Houghton Library, Lamont Library, and the New England Deposit Library. Funding for Houghton was raised privately, with the largest portion coming from Arthur A. Houghton Jr., in the form of stock in Corning Glass Works. Construction was largely completed by the fall of 1941, and the library opened on February 28, 1942.

Along with much else, Houghton holds collections of papers of Samuel Johnson, Emily Dickinson, Henry Wadsworth Longfellow, Margaret Fuller, John Keats, Ralph Waldo Emerson and his family, Amos Bronson Alcott and his daughter Louisa May Alcott, along with the papers of other notable transcendentalists. Significant collections include those relating to Theodore Roosevelt, T.S. Eliot, E.E. Cummings, Henry James, William James, James Joyce, John Updike, Jamaica Kincaid, Tennessee Williams, The Cockettes, John Lithgow, Gore Vidal, and many others. Houghton also holds the letters of Colonel Robert Gould Shaw, who commanded the 54th Massachusetts during the Civil War, and was killed during the assault on Fort Wagner.

Houghton mounts periodic exhibitions, open to the public, of various of its holdings.

== Collections ==
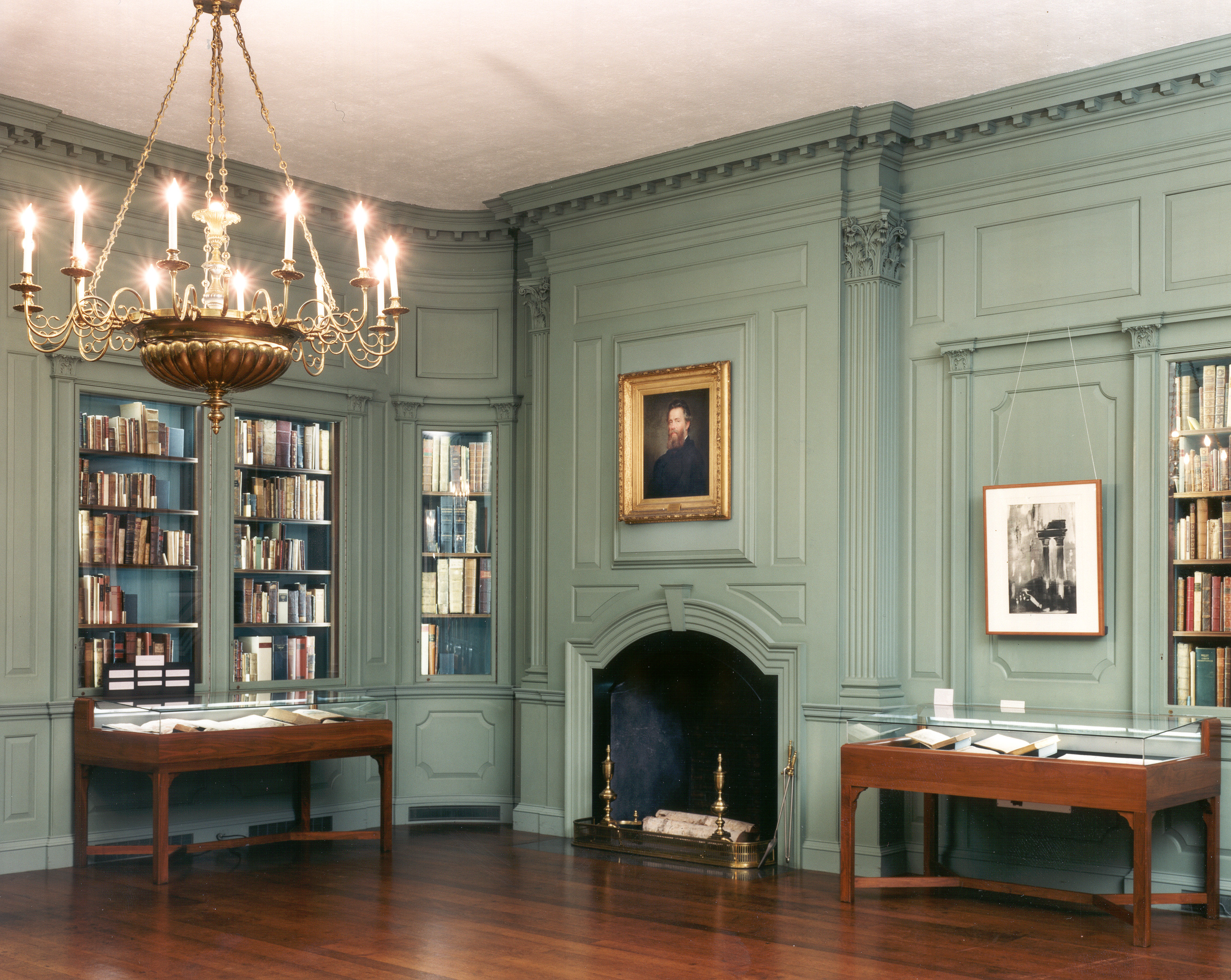
The Edison and Newman Room at Houghton

Houghton has five main curatorial departments:

- Early Books and Manuscripts, which includes a large collection of Medieval and Renaissance manuscripts and over 2,500 incunabula.
- Early Modern Books and Manuscripts, featuring the Donald and Mary Hyde Collection of Dr. Samuel Johnson, one of the largest collections of books and manuscripts relating to Samuel Johnson and his circle.
- Modern Books and Manuscripts, which collects material from 1800 to the present, including the papers and libraries of Emily Dickinson, John Keats, Leon Trotsky, Gore Vidal, John Updike, Amy Lowell, and collector Julio Mario Santo Domingo, Jr., among many others.
  - Modern Books & Manuscripts New Acquisitions Blog
- Printing & Graphic Arts which documents the history and art of book production. It was founded in 1938 by Philip Hofer.
- The Harvard Theatre Collection covering the history of the performing arts.
