= Romanes Lecture =

Annual public lecture

The Romanes Lecture (/roʊˈmɑːnɪs/ roh-MAH-niss or /roʊˈmɑːnɪz/ roh-MAH-niz) is a free public lecture given annually at the Sheldonian Theatre, Oxford, England.

The lecture series was founded by, and named after, the biologist George Romanes, and has been running since 1892. Over the years, many notable figures from the Arts and Sciences have been invited to speak. The lecture can be on any subject in science, art or literature, approved by the Vice-Chancellor of the University.

== List of Romanes lecturers and lecture subjects ==
=== 1890s ===
- 1892 William Ewart Gladstone — An Academic Sketch (A report of the speech is available in the digital archive of The Nation.)
- 1893 Thomas Henry Huxley — Evolution and Ethics (See also a contemporary review of Huxley's lecture)
- 1894 August Weismann — The Effect of External Influences upon Development
- 1895 Holman Hunt — The Obligations of the Universities towards Art
- 1896 Mandell Creighton — The English National Character
- 1897 John Morley — Machiavelli
- 1898 Archibald Geikie — Types of Scenery and their Influence on Literature
- 1899 Richard Claverhouse Jebb — Humanism in Education

=== 1900s ===
- 1900 James Murray — The Evolution of English Lexicography (Also available at The Oxford English Dictionary site.)
- 1901 Lord Acton — The German school of history
- 1902 James Bryce — The Relations of the Advanced and the Backward Races of Mankind
- 1903 Oliver Lodge — Modern views on matter
- 1904 Courtenay Ilbert — Montesquieu
- 1905 Ray Lankester — Nature and Man
- 1906 William Paton Ker — Sturla the Historian
- 1907 Lord Curzon — Frontiers
- 1908 Henry Scott Holland — The optimism of Butler's 'Analogy'
- 1909 Arthur Balfour — Criticism and Beauty

=== 1910s ===
- 1910 Theodore Roosevelt — Biological Analogies in History
- 1911 J.B. Bury — Romances of Chivalry on Greek Soil
- 1912 Henry Montagu Butler — Lord Chatham as an Orator
- 1913 William Mitchell Ramsay — The Imperial Peace: an ideal in European history
- 1914 J. J. Thomson – The Atomic Theory
- 1915 E. B. Poulton – Science and the Great War
- 1916
- 1917
- 1918 Herbert Henry Asquith — Some Aspects of The Victorian Age
- 1919

=== 1920s ===
- 1920 William Ralph Inge — The Idea of Progress
- 1921 Joseph Bédier — Roland à Roncevaux
- 1922 Arthur Stanley Eddington — The theory of relativity and its influence on scientific thought
- 1923 John Burnet — Ignorance
- 1924 John Masefield — Shakespeare & spiritual life
- 1925 William Henry Bragg — The Crystalline State
- 1926 G.M. Trevelyan — The Two-Party System in English Political History
- 1927 Frederic George Kenyon — Museums and National Life
- 1928 D. M. S. Watson — Palaeontology and the Evolution of Man
- 1929 Sir John William Fortescue — The Vicissitudes of Organized Power

=== 1930s ===
- 1930 Winston Churchill — Parliamentary Government and the Economic Problem
- 1931 John Galsworthy — The Creation of Character in Literature
- 1932 Berkley Moynihan — The Advance of Medicine
- 1933 Henry Hadow — The Place of Music among the Arts
- 1934 William Rothenstein — Form and content in English Painting
- 1935 Gilbert Murray — Then and Now
- 1936 Donald Francis Tovey — Normality and Freedom in Music
- 1937 Harley Granville-Barker — On Poetry in Drama
- 1938 Lord Robert Cecil — Peace and Pacifism
- 1939 Laurence Binyon — Art and freedom

=== 1940s ===
- 1940 Édouard Herriot, lecture not delivered
- 1941 William Hailey — The position of colonies in a British commonwealth of nations
- 1942 Norman H. Baynes — Intellectual liberty and totalitarian claims
- 1943 Julian Huxley — Evolutionary Ethics (50 years after his grandfather gave the lecture)
- 1944 G. M. Young — Mr Gladstone
- 1945 André Siegfried — Characteristics and Limits of our Western Civilization
- 1946 John Anderson — The machinery of government
- 1947 Lord Samuel — Creative Man
- 1948 Lord Brabazon of Tara — Forty years of flight
- 1949 Claud Schuster — Mountaineering

=== 1950s ===
- 1950 John Cockcroft — The development and future of nuclear energy
- 1951 Maurice Hankey — The science and art of government
- 1952 Lewis Bernstein Namier — Monarchy and the party system
- 1953 Viscount Simon — Crown and Commonwealth
- 1954 Kenneth Clark — Moments of Vision
- 1955 Albert Richardson — The significance of the fine arts
- 1956 Thomas Beecham — John Fletcher
- 1957 Ronald Knox — On English translation
- 1958 Edward Bridges — The State and the Arts
- 1959 Lord Denning — From Precedent to Precedent

=== 1960s ===
- 1960 Edgar Douglas Adrian — Factors in mental evolution
- 1961 Vincent Massey — Canadians and Their Commonwealth
- 1962 Cyril Radcliffe — Mountstuart Elphinstone
- 1963 Violet Bonham Carter — The impact of personality in politics (45 years after her father gave the lecture)
- 1964 Harold Hartley — Man and Nature
- 1965 Noel Annan — The Disintegration of an Old Culture
- 1966 Maurice Bowra — A case for humane learning
- 1967 Rab Butler — The Difficult Art of Autobiography
- 1968 Peter Medawar — Science and Literature
- 1969 Lord Holford — A World of Room

=== 1970s ===
- 1970 Isaiah Berlin — Fathers and Children: Turgenev and the Liberal Predicament (Broadcast on BBC Radio 3 on 14 February 1971)
- 1971 Raymond Aron — On the Use and Abuse of Futurology
- 1972 Karl Popper — On the Problem of Body and Mind
- 1973 Ernst Gombrich — Art History and the Social Sciences
- 1974 Solly Zuckermann — Advice and Responsibility
- 1975 Iris Murdoch — The Fire and the Sun: Why Plato banished the artists
- 1976 Edward Heath — The Future of a Nation
- 1977 Peter Hall — Form and Freedom in the Theatre
- 1978 George Porter — Science and the Human Purpose
- 1979 Hugh Casson — The arts and the academies

=== 1980s ===
- 1980 Jo Grimond — Is political philosophy based on a mistake?
- 1981 A.J.P. Taylor — War in Our Time
- 1982 Andrew Huxley — Biology, the Physical Sciences and the Mind
- 1983 Owen Chadwick — Religion and Society
- 1984
- 1985 Miriam Louisa Rothschild — Animals and Man
- 1986 Nicholas Henderson — Different Approaches to Foreign Policy
- 1987 Norman St. John-Stevas — The Omnipresence of Walter Bagehot
- 1988 Hugh Trevor-Roper — The Lost Moments of History (A revised version at the NYRB.)
- 1989

=== 1990s ===
- 1990 Saul Bellow — The Distracted Public
- 1991 Gianni Agnelli — Europe: Many Legacies, One Future
- 1992 Robert Blake — Gladstone, Disraeli and Queen Victoria (The Centenary Lecture)
- 1993 Henry Harris — Hippolyte's club foot: the medical roots of realism in modern European literature
- 1994 Lord Slynn of Hadley — Europe and Human Rights
- 1995 Walter Bodmer — The Book of Man
- 1996 Roy Jenkins — The Chancellorship of Oxford: A Contemporary View with a Little History
- 1997 Mary Robinson — Realizing Human Rights:"Take hold of it boldly and duly..."
- 1998 Amartya Sen — Reason before identity.
- 1999 Tony Blair — The Learning Habit

=== 2000s ===
- 2000 William G. Bowen — At a Slight Angle to the Universe: The University in a Digitized, Commercialized Age
- 2001 Neil MacGregor — The Perpetual Present. The Ideal of Art for All
- 2002 Tom Bingham — Personal Freedom and the Dilemma of Democracies
- 2003 Paul Nurse — The great ideas of biology
- 2004 Rowan Williams — Religious lives
- 2005 Shirley M. Tilghman — Strange bedfellows: science, politics, and religion
- 2006 Lecture was to have been delivered by Gordon Brown, but was postponed
- 2007 Dame Gillian Beer — Darwin and the Consciousness of Others
- 2008 Muhammad Yunus — Poverty Free World: When? How?
- 2009 Gordon Brown — Science and our Economic Future

=== 2010s ===
- 2011 (June) Andrew Motion — Bonfire of the Humanities
- 2011 (November) Martin Rees — The Limits of Science
- 2014 Steven Chu — Our Energy and Climate Change Challenges and Solutions
- 2015 Mervyn King — A Disequilibrium in the World Economy
- 2016 Patricia Scotland — The Commonwealth of Nations
- 2018 (June) Hillary Clinton – Making the Case for Democracy
- 2018 (November) Vint Cerf – The Pacification of Cyberspace
- 2019 Eliza Manningham-Buller - The Profession of Intelligence

=== 2020s ===
- 2020 Brenda Hale - Law in a Time of Crisis
- 2021 Dame Catherine Elizabeth Bingham, DBE - From wartime to peacetime: Lessons from the Vaccine Taskforce
- 2022 Micheál Martin - The Centre Will Hold: Liberal Democracy and the Populist Threat
- 2024 Geoffrey Hinton - Will digital intelligence replace biological intelligence
- 2025 Mishal Husain - Empire, Identity and the Search for Reason

== See also ==
- List of public lecture series
- Robert Boyle Lecture
