= Peter Beal =

British scholar of manuscripts (1944–2024)

Peter George Beal, FBA, FSA (16 April 1944 – 31 May 2024) was a British manuscript expert and indexer.

== Life and career ==
Educated at the University of Leeds, Beal worked in publishing as an editor before entering the auction house Sotheby's in 1980, where he was director of the department of printed books and manuscripts from 1996 to 2005. Beal's achievements at Sotheby’s were considerable. His achievements at Sotheby’s include: 1) catalogued the Duke and Duchess of Windsor’s papers for the sale of their entire estate; 2) cataloguing Winston Churchill’s papers; 3) He working on the only letter written in Arabic, by Lawrence of Arabia; 4) cataloguing the papers of Ted Heath and other statesmen; 5) the papers of Alice Liddell (Lewis Carroll’s “Alice”), the Thomas Hardy collection of Fred Adams, papers and letters by Jane Austen, the Bronte sisters, Arthur Conan Doyle, Oscar Wilde, James Joyce and Samuel Beckett.

Beal was responsible for editing the Index of English Literary Manuscripts between 1966 and 1993. This was a project to produce a full catalogue of manuscripts of 128 key authors from the period; spanning 23,000 entries, it included authors with entries in The Concise Cambridge Bibliography of English Literature (1974). He supported an AHRC-funded project to digitise and update the index; this was launched in 2011.

In 1998, Beal was editor or co-editor of the British Library's series English Manuscript Studies, 1100–1700.

Beal was elected a fellow of the British Academy in 1993.

Beal was the Lyell Reader in Bibliography at the University of Oxford from 1995 to 1996. His lectures were titled "In Praise of Scribes: Manuscripts and Their Makers in Seventeenth-Century England". They were assessed at length in The Book Collector in 2000.

From 2002, he was a senior research fellow at the Institute of English Studies in the University of London.

In 2007, he was elected a fellow of the Society of Antiquaries of London.

In 2012 Essays in Honour of Peter Beal was published by the British Library.

Beal died from pneumonia on 31 May 2024, at the age of 80.

== Selected publications ==
- Index of English Literary Manuscripts, 1450–1700, 4 vols (London: Mansell, 1980–1993)
- In Praise of Scribes: Manuscripts and their Makers in Seventeenth-Century England (Oxford: Oxford University Press, 1998).
- Beal, Peter, and Grace Ioppolo. 2002. Manuscripts and Their Makers in the English Renaissance. London: British Library.
- Beal, Peter. 2007. New Texts and Discoveries in Early Modern English Manuscripts. London: British Library.
- (editor, with Grace Ioppolo) Elizabeth I and the Culture of Writing (London: British Library, 2007)
- A Dictionary of English Manuscript Terminology (Oxford: Oxford University Press, 2008)
- Discovering, Identifying and Editing Early Modern Manuscripts. 2013. London: British Library.
