= Mary Pollard =

Librarian and literary scholar (1922–2005)

Mary "Paul" Pollard
- Born: 5 June 1922; Essex, England
- Died: 24 June 2005 (aged 83); Dublin, Ireland

Mary "Paul" Pollard (5 June 1922 – 24 June 2005) was a librarian at the Library of Trinity College Dublin and a specialist in early printed books.

== Early life and education ==
Mary "Paul" Pollard was born in Essex, England on 5 June 1922. She was the eldest of the three daughters and a son of Richard Payne Pollard and his wife (née Wilkinson). Her father was an Irish emigrant. Pollard attended Hawnes School before going on to study medicine for a number of years, abandoning that just before completing her studies to take up librarianship. She took a position at Southlands Teacher Training College, now a part of the University of Roehampton while she studied for the associateship of the Library Association.

== Career ==
Pollard came to Dublin in 1957 to take up two part time positions, one at Marsh's Library and the Library of Trinity College Dublin. Marsh's Library could not pay her a full salary, instead provided her with a flat under the library, which was notoriously cold, where she lived for the rest of her life. She kept these two jobs for 8 years, until she took up a full time post at Trinity. Throughout her career her specialism was in early printed books, becoming the designated rare book librarian at Trinity in 1964. Her research and dissertation for the fellowship of the Library Association was titled The woodcut ornament stocks of the Dublin printers 1551–1700 with lists of unsigned works identified as from their presses for which she received distinction.

She was in charge of the department of older printed books, which was housed in the reconstructed east pavilion of the Old Library, which opened to readers in 1968. This department initially handled books from pre-1800, but went on to cover the entire contents of the Old Library and Gallery which included 19th century material. Pollard oversaw an overall improvement in the library's antiquarian books with relatively little funds. She identified gaps in the library's collections on 18th century English literature, drama and language, as well as Irish political, economic and social works, and sought to fill these. When funds were available she directed the purchase of collections such as that of Jonathan Swift and related objects at the T. A. Hollick sale at Sotheby's in 1976 with money from the trustees of the estate of Alfred Chester Beatty.

Pollard implemented the use of Anglo-American cataloguing rules, creating a more rigorous catalogue of early printed books, developing a supplementary code in 1970 which provided for a complete analysis of all the physical aspects of a book. During the same period she began to informally teach academics and postgraduates on historical bibliography, which was eventually officially included within the M.Phil. in reformation and enlightenment studies. As part of her work with this course, Pollard established a hand press, the Trinity Closet Press, now housed in the basement of the College Printing House. She was appointed sub-librarian in 1970 and the first keeper of early printed books in 1980.

She retired from the post of keeper in 1983 to focus on her research on the Dublin book trade. This research went on to be published in two books: Dublin's trade in books, 1550–1800 and A dictionary of members of the Dublin book trade, 1550–1800 (2000). The first volume was based on her research as Lyell Lecturer in Bibliography at the University of Oxford in 1986-1987. In the early 1960s, Pollard established her own hand press in a disused room in Marsh's Library with the help of Liam Miller. Over the course of 20 years, she published very limited editions of prose squibs and verse satires on contemporary events.

== Later life and legacy ==
In 2001 Dublin University awarded her an honorary D.Litt., and in 2002 she was elected a member of the Royal Irish Academy. A Festschrift, That woman!: studies in Irish bibliography was published in 2005. Writing of the launch of the Festschrift on June 9, 2005 in The Book Collector Toby Barnard observed that she was "a figure who linked the eighteenth to the twentieth centuries and, in doing so, saved and illuminated vital aspects of Irish culture."

Pollard died on 24 June 2005. She had an extensive collection of 11,500 pre-1914 children's books at her flat, which she collected over the course of 50 years. She had a particular interest in books for Irish material and books for girls. This collection, known as the Pollard Collection, was bequeathed to the Library of Trinity College Dublin, along with her collecting notebooks.
