= Lyell Lectures =

Endowed lecture series on bibliography

The Lyell Readership in Bibliography is an endowed annual lecture series given at the University of Oxford. Instituted in 1952 by a bequest from the solicitor, book collector and bibliographer, James Patrick Ronaldson Lyell. After Lyell's death, Keeper of the Western Manuscripts at the Bodleian Library, Richard William Hunt, writing of the Lyell bequest noted, "he was a self-taught bibliophile and scholar of extraordinary enthusiasm and discrimination, and one who deserves to be remembered not only by Oxford but by the whole bibliographical world."

The series has continued down to the present day.

Together with the Panizzi Lectures at the British Library and the Sandars Lectures at Cambridge University, it is considered one of the major British bibliographical lecture series.

== Lectures ==
- 1952–1953 Neil Ripley Ker: English Manuscripts in the Century after the Norman Conquest
- 1954–1955 Walter Wilson Greg: Some Aspects and Problems of London Publishing between 1550 and 1650
- 1956–1957 Stanley Arthur Morison: Aspects of Authority and Freedom in Relation to Greco–Latin Script, Inscription, and Type
- 1959–1960 Fredson T. Bowers: Bibliography and Textual Criticism
- 1960–1961 Henry Graham Pollard: The Medieval Book Trade in Oxford
- 1961–1962 Philip Hofer: The Artist and the Book in France
- 1962–1963 A.N.L. Munby: Three Nineteenth-Century Collectors of Manuscripts
- 1963–1964 Jacques Guignard: L'Art de le Reliure en France et l'Action des Bibliophiles: Quelques Aspects de la Question
- 1964–1965 William Beattie: Some Aspects of the History of the Advocates' Library
- 1965–1966 Simon Harcourt Nowell-Smith: International Copyright Law and the Publisher in the Reign of Queen Victoria
- 1966–1967 Anthony Ian Doyle: Some English Scribes and Scriptoria of the Later Middle Ages
- 1967–1968 Harry Graham Carter: A View of Early Typography up to about 1600
- 1968–1969 Cornelis Reedijk: The Labours of Hercules: Some Observations on the History of Erasmus's Opera Omnia
- 1969–1970 William Burton Todd: Scholarly Texts: Variable Techniques and Designs
- 1970–1971 Otto Ernst Pächt: The Art of Drawing within the Realm of Medieval Illumination
- 1971–1972 Wytze Hellinga: The Bibliography of Early Printing in the Low Countries between 1767 and 1874
- 1972–1973 André Camille Lucien Masson: Le Catalogue Figuratif: A Pictorial Guide to the Contents of European Libraries from the Fifteenth to the Eighteenth Century
- 1973–1974 Alan W. Tyson: Beethoven: Studies in the Genesis of his Music 1803–9
- 1974–1975 T. A. M. Bishop: The Script of Corbie
- 1975–1976 David F. Foxon: Pope and the Early Eighteenth-Century Book Trade.
- 1976–1977 T. Julian Brown: The Insular System of Scripts, c.600–c.850
- 1977–1978 Mme Jeanne Veyrin-Forrer: La Famille Fournier et la Fonderie Typographique en France au XVIIIe Siècle
- 1978–1979 Howard Millar Nixon: English Decorated Bookbindings
- 1979–1980 Monsignor José Ruysschaert: Recherches Vaticanes sur la Miniature Italienne du Quinzième Siecle
- 1980–1981 Ian Gilbert Philip: The Bodleian Library in the Seventeenth and Eighteenth Centuries
- 1981–1982 Berthold Wolpe: The Quest for Beauchesne: Contributions to the History of Elizabethan Calligraphy and Print-Making
- 1982–1983 Jonathan J.G. Alexander: Creation and Transmission: Methods of Work of Manuscript Illuminators in the Middle Ages
- 1983–1984 Robert Shackleton: The Bibliographical History of Montesquieu
- 1984–1985 Gordon Norton Ray: The Art Deco Book in France
- 1985–1986 Edwin Wolf: Books, Bookmen, and Booksellers in Colonial Philadelphia
- 1986–1987 Mary Pollard: Dublin Trade in Books 1550 to 1800
- 1987–1988 D.F. McKenzie: Bibliography and History: Seventeenth-Century England
- 1988–1989 Donald H. Reiman: The Study of Modern Manuscripts: Public, Confidential, and Private
- 1989–1990 Elizabeth L. Eisenstein: Grub Street Abroad: Aspects of the French Cosmopolitan Press from the Age of Louis XIV to the French Revolution
- 1990–1991 A. R. A. Hobson: Two Renaissance Book-Collectors: Jean Grolier and Diego Hurtado de Mendoza, Their Libraries and Bookbindings
- 1991–1992 R.H. Rouse: Book-Producers and Pook-Production in Paris: Family, Shop, and Neighbourhood on the Rue Neuve Notre-Dame, 1200–1500
- 1992–1993 Bernhard Fabian: English Authors and German Publishers in the Eighteenth Century
- 1993–1994 Joseph Burney Trapp: Illustrations of Petrarch from the Fourteenth to the Sixteenth Century
- 1994–1995 Henri-Jean Martin: Du Manuscrit au Livre Imprimé: Mise en Page et Mise en Texte des Textes Littéraires Français de la Fin due XVe Siècle au Milieu du XVIIe Siècle
- 1995–1996 Peter Beal: In Praise of Scribes: Manuscripts and Their Makers in Seventeenth-Century England
- 1996–1997 Robert Darnton: Policing Literature in Eighteenth-Century Paris
- 1998–1999 Malcolm B. Parkes: Their Hands before Our Eyes: A Closer Look at Scribes.
- 1999–2000 David McKitterick: Set in Print: The Fortunes of an Idea, c.1450–1800
- 2000–2001 Rodney Malcolm Thomson: Books and Learning in Twelfth-Century England: The Ending of 'Alter Orbis'
- 2001–2002 Bruce Bryning Redford: Designing the Life of Johnson
- 2002–2003 Nigel G. Wilson: The World of Books in Byzantium
- 2003–2004 Kathleen L. Scott: Suppleatur per Ymaginacionem: Exceptional Images in Later Medieval English Manuscripts
- 2004–2005 Reinhard Wittmann: Literary Life and Book-Market in Germany under the Swastika 1933–1945
- 2005–2006 Leslie Howsam: Historical Knowledge and British Publishers, 1850–1950: Discipline and Narrative
- 2006–2007 Mirella Ferrari: The Scriptorium and Library of Bobbio
- 2007–2008 Kristian Jensen: Collecting Incunabula: Enlightenment, Revolution, and the Market — Rediscovering and Re-Creating the Earliest Printed Books in the Eighteenth Century
- 2008–2009 Christopher F.R. de Hamel: Fragments in Book Bindings
- 2009–2010 Ian Maclean: The Business of Scholarship: The Trade in Latin Books in the Age of Confessions, 1560–1630
- 2010–2011 David Parker: Describing the New Testament
- 2011–2012 Lukas Erne: Shakespeare and the Book Trade
- 2012–2013 Richard Beadle: Late Medieval English Autograph Writings and Their Uses
- 2013–2014 H.R. Woudhuysen: 'Almost Identical': Copying Books in England, 1600–1900
- 2014–2015 Michael F. Suarez, sj: The Reach of Bibliography
- 2015–2016 Teresa Webber: Public Reading and its Books: Monastic Ideals and Practice in England c. 1000–c. 1300
- 2016–2017 Paul Nelles: The Vatican Library in the Counter-Reformation
- 2017–2018 David Pearson: Book Ownership in Stuart England
- 2018–2019 Richard Sharpe: Libraries and Books in Medieval England: The Role of Libraries in a Changing Book Economy (recordings here)
- 2019–2020 Marc Smith: Writing models from manuscript to print: France, England and Europe, c.1400–1800 (recordings here)
- 2020–2021 Paul Needham: The Genesis, Life, and Afterlife of the Gutenberg Bible (link to recorded versions here)
- 2021–2022 Susan Rankin: From Memory to Written Record: English Liturgical Books and Musical Notations, 900–1150 (first lecture available here)
- 2022-2023 Ann M. Blair: In the scholar’s workshop: amanuenses in early modern Europe
- 2024-2025 Stephen Oakley: Copying the Classics (and Fathers): explorations in the transmission of Latin text.
- 2026 Mercedes García-Arenal: Muslim Books in Christian Hands: From Iberian Moriscos to Early Modern Europe.

== See also ==
- A.S.W. Rosenbach Lectures in Bibliography
- E. A. Lowe Lectures
- McKenzie Lectures
- Panizzi Lectures
- Sandars Lectures
