= Public lecture =

Spoken presentation aimed at the general public

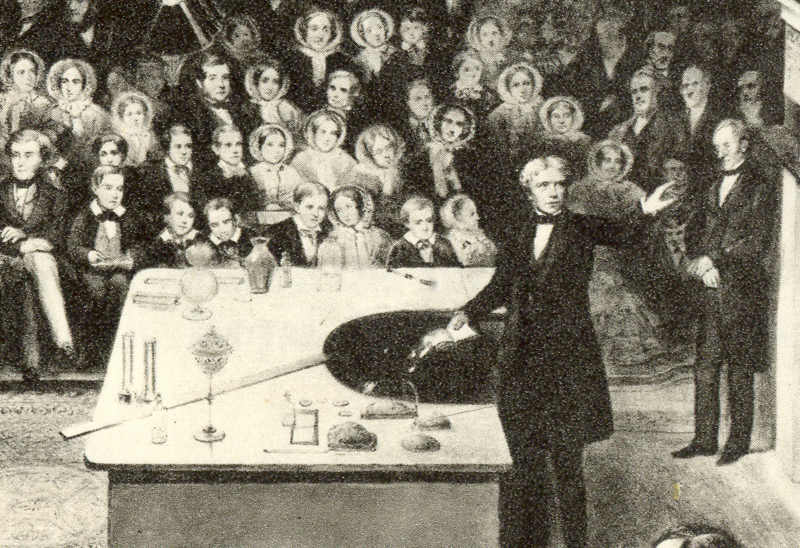
Michael Faraday, nineteenth century scientist and electrician, shown delivering the British Royal Institution's Christmas Lecture for Juveniles during the Institution's Christmas break in 1856.

A public lecture (also known as an open lecture) is one means employed for educating the public. Gresham College, in London, has been providing free public lectures since its founding in 1597 through the will of Sir Thomas Gresham. The Royal Society held its first ever meeting at Gresham College in November 1660, after one of Christopher Wren's lectures, and continued to meet there for the next fifty years.

The Royal Institution of Great Britain has a long history of public lectures and demonstrations given by prominent experts in the field. In the 19th century, the popularity of the public lectures given by Sir Humphry Davy at the Royal Institution was so great that the volume of carriage traffic in Albemarle Street caused it to become the first one-way street in London. The Royal Institution's Christmas Lectures for young people are nowadays also shown on television. Alexander von Humboldt delivered a series of public lectures at the University of Berlin in the winter of 1827–1828, that formed the basis for his later work Kosmos.

== Public autopsies ==
Besides public lectures, public autopsies have been important in promoting knowledge of medicine. The autopsy of Dr. Johann Gaspar Spurzheim, advocate of phrenology, was conducted in public, and his brain, skull, and heart were removed, preserved in jars of alcohol, and put on display to the public. Public autopsies have verged on entertainment: American showman P. T. Barnum held a public autopsy of Joice Heth after her death. Heth was a woman whom Barnum had been featuring as being over 160 years old. Barnum charged 50 cents admission. The autopsy demonstrated that she was between 76 and 80 years old.

== See also ==
- Collège de France
- Lecture
- List of public lecture series
