= Ernst Philip Goldschmidt =

Austrian-British antiquarian bookseller and scholar

Ernst Philip Goldschmidt (1887–1954) was a Viennese-born antiquarian bookseller, scholar and bibliophile. During his career he issued more than 100 "meticulously researched" and scholarly sales catalogues, which "set high standards" and many of which are now standard reference works in libraries. He also wrote books and articles about early books and manuscripts, including his Gothic and Renaissance Bookbindings (1928), which remains "one of the most important works on bookbinding history", and works on the relation of humanism to the spread of printing, which "broke new ground".

== Life and career ==
Ernst (Moritz) Philip Goldschmidt was born in Vienna, Austria-Hungary on 1 December 1887. He came from the Goldschmidt banking family. His father Philipp Heymann Goldschmidt (1839-1905) was Dutch and worked in Vienna and his mother was Clara Edle von Portheim (1853-1932).

After attending high school in Vienna, Goldschmidt studied at Trinity College, Cambridge from 1905. In 1909 he returned to Vienna and temporarily assisted the incunabulist Konrad Haebler in "describing thousands of fifteenth century books in Austrian monastic libraries" for the projected Gesamtkatalog der Wiegendrucke (English, "The Union Catalogue of Incunabula"), which he also helped finance. In 1914, against his family's wishes, he decided to become an antiquarian bookseller. In 1919 he became an authorized signatory for the Gilhofer und Ranschburg antiquarian bookshop in Vienna, in 1920 he became a partner together with Wilhelm H. Schab, and in September 1923 he resigned as a partner.

"Hard hit financially in the post-World War I period", Goldschmidt left Vienna for the United Kingdom and started anew in the bookselling business by founding an antiquarian bookshop, E. P. Goldschmidt & Co., located in Laurence Sterne's old house at 45 New Bond Street, London and specializing particularly in "manuscripts, early printed books, and bookbindings". In 1925 he relocated permanently to London. From 1933 to 1948 he worked in the firm with Ernst Weil. In 1948 Jacques Vellekoop became his assistant and after many years in that role continued to run the firm after Goldschmidt's death until its closure in about 1993.

Goldschmidt held the Sandars Readership in Bibliography in 1953 and lectured on "The First Cambridge Press in Its European Setting".

Goldschmidt died in London on 18 February 1954.

== Legacy ==
Goldschmidt has been described as "perhaps the most learned of antiquarian booksellers". In addition to his scholarly output, he was one of a generation of refugee booksellers from Europe who arrived in London in the 1930s, including Ernst Weil, H. A. Feisenberger, Bernard H. Breslauer, Heinrich Eisemann, Maurice L. Ettinghausen, and Albi Rosenthal, and "widened the range and greatly improved the scholarship of bookselling" in the United Kingdom and who introduced English and American collectors to books that had previously been "overlooked or undervalued".

In 1995 the Rare Book School at the University of Virginia established a fellowship, named the E. Ph. Goldschmidt Fellowship, to honour the memory of this "great London antiquarian bookseller". Under this scheme the RBS "promising persons who are beginning careers in rare books, the antiquarian book trade, and related fields". In addition, fellows attend an RBS course and "work as program staff member or lab instructor".

== Select list of publications ==
- Seventy-Five Books from a Library Formed by E. Ph. Goldschmidt of Trinity College, Cambridge 1905–1909. Privately printed at the University Press for the Collector, Cambridge University Press, 1909 - Goldschmidt's first catalogue, being a privately printed and annotated list of the books in his personal collection.
- Gothic and Renaissance Bookbindings Exemplified and Illustrated from the Author’s Collection. London: Ernst Benn Ltd., 1928.
- Hieronymus Münzer und seine Bibliothek (Studies of the Warburg Institute, Volume 4). London: Warburg Institute, 1938.
- Medieval Texts and Their First Appearance in Print. London: Bibliographical Society, 1943.
- The Printed Book of the Renaissance : Three Lectures on Type, Illustration, Ornament. Cambridge University Press, 1950.
- The First Cambridge Press in Its European Setting. Cambridge University Press, 1955 (Sandars Lectures, 1953).
