= T. A. Birrell =

Thomas Anthony Clement Birrell (25 July 1924 – 22 May 2011) was Professor of English and American Literature at the Catholic University of Nijmegen (1949–84) and also served as the university's rector. In 1984 a Festschrift was published in his honour, Studies in Seventeenth-Century English Literature, History and Bibliography, edited by G.A.M. Janssens and F.G.A.M. Aarts (Amsterdam: Rodopi, 1984).

== Life ==
Birrell was born in London to a Scottish Presbyterian father and an Irish Catholic mother. He was raised as a Catholic, and received his secondary education at Downside School (1937–1941). His university studies at Cambridge were interrupted by the Second World War. He served in the Royal Armoured Corps, in the Netherlands and in India, returning to Cambridge in 1946 and graduating with honours in 1947.

He briefly taught at the Cambridge Technical College, and at St Benedict's School, Ealing. In 1949 he accepted a position in the English department at the Catholic University of Nijmegen. He went on to become professor and head of department, and served a term as rector of the university.

Birrell was particularly interested in seventeenth-century English Catholic literature. With David Rogers and Antony Allison, he revived the Catholic Record Society after the war, and from 1958 he helped to organize the Society's annual conference.

After retiring from Nijmegen, Birrell moved to London and spent the next 20 years working on the history of libraries, particularly of the Royal Collection in the British Library. In 1990 he moved to Oxford, where he lived until his death in 2011.

== Work ==
Birrell is best known for his 1986 Panizzi Lectures, published in 1987 as English Monarchs and Their Books: From Henry VII to Charles II, a groundbreaking study of England's Royal Library. Most of his publications appeared under the name "T. A. Birrell". A collected volume of his articles was published by Ashgate in 2013 as Aspects of Book Culture in Early Modern England, edited by Jos Blom.

=== Lectures and textbooks ===
- Catholic Allegiance and the Popish Plot: A Study of Some Catholic Writers of the Restoration Period; inaugural lecture, 17 March 1950.
- Geschiedenis van de Engelse literatuur, translated by C.E.M. Heijnen. Utrecht: Prisma, 1961.
- De culturele achtergrond van twee wetenschappelijke revoluties. Het Londen van Robert Hooke en het Philadelphia van James Logan. (The Cultural background of two scientific revolutions. Robert Hooke's London and James Logan's Philadelphia), translated by J. M. G. A. Aarts. Utrecht: Dekker & Van de Vegt, 1963.
- The Library of John Morris: The Reconstruction of a Seventeenth-Century Collection. London: British Museum Publications, 1976.
- Amerikaanse letterkunde, translated by J. M. Blom. Aula-boeken 668. Utrecht: Spectrum, 1982.
- Shakespeare stuk voor stuk. Aula pocket 716. Utrecht: Spectrum, 1985.
- English Monarchs and Their Books: From Henry VII to Charles II. Panizzi Lectures 1986. London: British Library, 1987.

=== Introductions to facsimile reprints ===
- Simon Patrick, A Brief Account of the New Sect of Latitude-Men (1662). Augustan Reprint Society Publication 100. Los Angeles: William Andrews Clark Memorial Library, University of California, 1963.
- Robert Pugh, Blacklo's Cabal, 1680. Farnborough: Gregg International, 1970.
- Thomas Stapleton, Florus Anglo-Bavaricus, Liège 1685. Farnborough: Gregg, 1970.
- Gregorio Panzani, The Memoirs of Gregorio Panzani, translated from the Italian original and now first published, to which are added an introduction and a supplement [...] by Joseph Berington), Birmingham 1793. Farnborough: Gregg, 1970.

=== Afterwords to translations of Dickens ===
- Nicolaas Nickleby, translated by Jan Nieuwenhuis. Prisma klassieken 10. Utrecht: Het Spectrum, 1978.
- Kleine Dorrit, translated by G. J. Werumeus Buning-Ensink. Prisma klassieken 20. Utrecht: Het Spectrum, 1979.
