= Philip Hofer (book collector) =

American librarian (1898–1984)

Philip Hofer (1898–1984) was a book collector, librarian, and founder and first curator of the Department of Printing and Graphic Arts, Houghton Library at Harvard University.

Hofer was born into a wealthy family in Cincinnati, Ohio. His mother was a trustee of the Cincinnati Art Museum, and it was through her associations that he gained some of his early exposure to fine art.

== Education and career ==
Hofer graduated from Harvard University in 1921. After working in business, he returned to study for a master's degree in the history of art, which he obtained in 1929.

His first professional position was at the New York Public Library from 1930 to 1934 as bibliographer for the Spencer Collection. He worked from 1934 to 1937 at the Pierpont Morgan Library with Belle da Costa Greene.

Hofer returned to Harvard in 1938 to assume the new position of Curator of Printing and Graphic Arts, at the invitation of the newly appointed library director, William Jackson. It was the first such position in the United States. In 1942, when Houghton Library opened, Hofer's collection was moved into the building, along with treasures from across Harvard's library and museum holdings.

Hofer remained at Houghton Library for forty years, building the collection. He focused heavily on exempla of printing processes throughout history. He retired as curator in 1968. The Philip Hofer Prize for Collecting Books or Art, open to Harvard undergraduates and graduate students was established in 1988.

He was also Secretary of the Fogg Art Museum at Harvard University from 1952 to 1964.

In 1961-1962 Hofer was Lyell Lecturer in Bibliography at the University of Oxford.

== Book collecting ==
Hofer began collecting rare books while still a student. He was especially focused on the art of the book and original material in the graphic arts. His extensive collections documented the history of letterforms and book illustration. He assembled collections of incunabula and illuminated manuscripts. German, Iberian and Italian illustrated books of the 18th century were a special focus of his collecting.

He bequeathed his collection to the Department of Printing and Graphic Arts at the Houghton Library. The introduction to the Catalogue of an Exhibition of the Philip Hofer Bequest published in 1988 notes that "the unique character of this collection reflects the man who formed it: wide-ranging, specialized, and complex."

== Asian Prints and Printing ==
Hofer collected important examples in the printing and graphic arts of Asia, donating collections to the Fogg Art Museum and the Sackler Museum at Harvard and the Museum of Fine Arts in Boston.

== Printing Instruction ==
Hofer believed it was important for students to try their hand at printing in order to better understand historical examples in the . Printing and Graphic Arts collections. Hence, he founded and oversaw the operation of a small printing studio for Harvard students, located first in Widener Library, and then in the new Lamont Library when it opened in 1949. Students printed small printed editions of brief manuscripts held in Houghton Library's collections. The typeface used for most of this work was Caslon Old Face.

== Selected publications ==
- Baroque Book Illustration: a Short Survey from the Collection in the Department of Graphic Arts. Cambridge, MA: Harvard University Press, 1951.
- Eighteenth-century Book Illustrations. Los Angeles: William Andrews Clark Memorial Library, University of California, 1956.
- Hofer, Philip, Lawrence C Wroth, Rudolph Ruzicka, (New York, N.Y.), and Lessing J. Rosenwald Collection (Library of Congress). 1957. John Howard Benson & His Work, 1901-1956. New York: Typophiles.
- Edward Lear. New York: Oxford University Press, 1962.
- Some [Delacroix] Drawings and Lithographs for Goethe’s Faust. Cambridge, MA: Harvard College Library, Department of Printing & Graphic Arts, 1964.
- Edward Lear as a Landscape Draughtsman. Cambridge, MA: Belknap Press of Harvard University Press, 1967.
- Hofer, Philip, and Théodore Chassériau. Othello, Fifteen Etchings. New York: Walker, 1969.
- Hofer, Philip. Mishaps of a Compulsive Collector. Printed at the Rosemary Press for Friends of the Smith College Library, 1970.
- Angel, Marie, et al. An Animated Alphabet. Harvard College Library, Dept. of Print. and Graphic Arts, 1971. Foreword by Philip Hofer.
- Loring, Rosamond B., et al. Decorated Book Papers : Being an Account of Their Designs and Fashions. 3rd ed. / edited by Philip Hofer., Harvard College Library, Dept. of Printing and Graphic Arts, 1973.
- Hofer, Philip. Four Quatrains from the Rubaiyat. Four Winds Press, 1973.
- Holbein, et al. The Dance of Death : Les Simulachres & Historiées Faces de La Mort. Cygnet Press, 1974. Introductory essay by Philip Hofer.
- Lear, Edward, et al. A Lear Song, The Broom, the Shovel, the Poker, and the Tongs. Four Winds Press, 1977. Foreword by Philip Hofer.
- Hofer, Philip, et al. A Brief Note on Book Collecting. August Heckscher, the Printing Office at High Loft, 1977.
- Kepes, Gyorgy, and Philip Hofer. Gyorgy Kepes : 12 Photographs. Vision Gallery of Boston, 1977. Introduction by Philip Hofer.
- Hyman, Susan, et al. Edward Lear’s Birds. Morrow, 1980. Introduction by Philip Hofer.
