= Eric Millar =

British art historian

Eric George Millar (1887–13 January 1966) was the Keeper of Manuscripts from 1944 onwards at the British Museum and a scholar interested in English illuminated manuscripts.

He produced the two-volume work English Illuminated Manuscripts from the Xth to the XIIIth Century in 1926 and 1928.

In 1934 he gave the Sandars Lectures on bibliography at the University of Cambridge on "Some Aspects of the Comparative Study of Illuminated Manuscripts".

Millar also produced a book on the Lindisfarne Gospels and a two-volume catalogue of the Chester Beatty Papyri.

Millar was a member of the Athenaeum Club.
