= J. C. T. Oates =

British librarian (1912–1990)

John Claud Trewinard Oates FBA (24 June 1912 – 11 June 1990) was a librarian at the University of Cambridge, a trustee of the university, and president of the Bibliographical Society (1970–72).

He was educated at The Crypt School, Gloucester, and Trinity College, Cambridge, graduating in 1935. He became assistant under-librarian at Cambridge University Library a year later, was promoted to under-librarian in 1949, deputy librarian in 1975, and finally became acting chief librarian in 1979, a year before his retirement.

He was also Reader (later Emeritus) in Historical Bibliography at Cambridge, and a fellow of Darwin College. In 1952 he held the Sandars Readership in Bibliography speaking on "A History of the Collection of Incunabula in the Cambridge University Library, and again in 1965 on "Abraham Whelock (1593–1653): Orientalist, Anglo-Saxonist and University Librarian."

He was elected a fellow of the British Academy in 1976.

== Selected publications ==
- Cambridge University Library: A historical sketch. Cambridge University Library, Cambridge, 1975. ISBN 0902205102 (reprinted from The Encyclopedia of Library and Information Science, Vol. 4, Marcel Dekker, pp. 50–70.
