= Nicolai Rubinstein =

German art historian (1911–2002)

Nicolai Rubinstein, FBA, FRHistS (13 July 1911 – 19 August 2002) was a German-born historian of Renaissance Italy who lived in England from 1939.

== Early life ==
Rubinstein was born on 13 July 1911 in Berlin, Germany, to Latvian and Hungarian Jewish parents. He studied at the University of Berlin and moved to Florence in Italy in the 1930s, where he was an assistant to Nicola Ottokar.

== Academia ==
In 1939, he fled Italy and migrated to England to escape persecution. He lectured at the University of Oxford before becoming a lecturer in history at the University College, Southampton, in 1942. In 1945, he moved to Westfield College, London, to take up a lectureship. He was promoted to a readership in 1962 and to the Professorship of History there in 1965, in which office he remained until he retired in 1978.

As The Guardian wrote in its obituary of him, Rubinstein was "one of the 20th century's most eminent scholars of renaissance Italy". He wrote The Government of Florence under the Medici, 1434–1494 (1966), Florentine Studies: Politics and Society in Renaissance Florence (1968), and The Palazzo Vecchio, 1298–1532: Government, Architecture and Imagery in the Civic Palace of the Florentine Republic (1995). He was the general editor of the Letters of Lorenzo de' Medici and personally edited volumes 3 and 4 in the series. His honours included fellowship of the Royal Historical Society, and of the British Academy (he was elected to the latter in 1971); he also received the British Academy's Serena Medal in 1974. Rubinstein died on 19 August 2002.
