= Francis Wormald =

British educator and administrator (1904–1972)

Francis Wormald CBE FBA FSA (1904 - 11 January 1972) was a British educator who served as director of the Institute of Historical Research from 1960 to 1967.

In 1948 he held the Sandars Readership in Bibliography at Cambridge University.
