= John Lough =

John Lough, FBA (19 February 1913 – 21 June 2000) was an English scholar of French literature and history. He was the Professor of French at Durham University from 1952 to 1978.

== Early life and education ==
Lough was born in Newcastle upon Tyne on 19 February 1913; his father was a butcher and shopkeeper and his mother came from a family of farmers. He attended the Royal Grammar School in Newcastle, where he excelled and developed an interest in modern languages. He received a scholarship to St John's College, Cambridge; he placed in the first class for Part I of the Tripos in French and German, and did the same in Part II in 1934. He then completed doctoral studies at Cambridge on Baron d'Holbach, with Harry Ashton as his adviser. He spent 1935–36 on a scholarship to the British Institute in Paris; while there, he met Muriel Alice Barker, whom he later married and collaborated with academically. He was awarded his PhD in 1937.

== Career and honours ==
In 1937, Lough was appointed to an assistant lectureship in French at the University of Aberdeen. He was promoted to be a full lecturer in 1945 but moved to the University of Cambridge in 1946 to take up a lectureship (which did not come with a fellowship at any of the colleges). In 1952, he became Professor of French at Durham University. Lough's expertise was in 17th- and 18th-century French literature and history: he studied Denis Diderot's work and his Encyclopédie; theatre; and the testimonies of English travellers in France. He edited Diderot's Selected Philosophical Writings (1953) and Locke's Travels in France, 1675–1679, as Related in His Journals, Correspondence and Papers (1953). He then wrote: The "Encyclopédie" of Diderot and D'Alembert: Selected Articles (1954), An Introduction to Seventeenth Century France (1954), Paris Theatre Audiences in the Seventeenth and Eighteenth Centuries (1957), An Introduction to Eighteenth Century France (1960), Essays on the "Encyclopédie" of Diderot and D'Alembert (1968), The "Encyclopédie" in Eighteenth-Century England and Other Studies (1970), The "Encyclopédie" (1971), and The Contributors to the "Encyclopédie" (1973). He also edited French Prose Composition with F. C. Roe (1963) and, with Jacques Proust, volumes five to eight of the Œuvres Complètes of Diderot (1976).

Retiring from his chair in 1978, Lough continued to write. He authored Writer and Public in France: From the Middle Ages to the Present Day (1978), Seventeenth-Century French Drama: The Background (1979), The "Philosophes" and Post-Revolutionary France (1982), France Observed in the Seventeenth Century (1985) and France on the Eve of the Revolution: British Travellers' Observations, 1763–1788 (1987). With his wife Muriel he authored An Introduction to Nineteenth-Century France (1978), and with his sister Elizabeth Merston he wrote John Graham Lough (1789–1876), a Northumbrian Sculptor (1987) about his great-great uncle.

Lough received an honorary doctorate from the University of Clermont-Ferrand (1967) and an Honorary DLitt at Newcastle University (1972), was appointed an Officer of the National Order of Merit of France in 1973 and two years later he was elected to the fellowship of the British Academy. He retired in Durham, where he died on 21 June 2000. (Note: This is the date given by Ann Moss in her biography of Lough for The Oxford Dictionary of National Biography, which cites his death certificate. In her biography in Proceedings of the British Academy, Moss gives his date of death as the 13 July, but her obituary of him in The Independent (published on 5 July) gives the 28 June and in Seventeenth-Century French Studies gives the 21 June; the 21 June is also given in his entry in Who Was Who and in obituaries in The Times and The Seventeenth Century.) Muriel had died two years earlier; he was survived by their daughter.
