= Wallace Kirsop =

Australian academic (1933–2026)

Wallace Kirsop FAHA
- Born: 4 November 1933; Chatswood, New South Wales, Australia
- Died: 12 August 2026 (aged 92)
- Occupations: Academic; bibliographer
- Writing career
- Notable works: Towards a History of the Australian Book Trade; Research on Western European Languages and Literatures in Australia Since 1958; Books for Colonial Readers: The Nineteenth-century Australian Experience; Catering for the Empire: Reactions to Macmillan's Colonial Library

Wallace Kirsop (4 November 1933 – 12 August 2026) was an Australian scholar in French studies and book trade history.

== Background ==
Wallace Kirsop was born in Chatswood, New South Wales, on 4 November 1933. His parents were William Kirsop, an accountant and avid cricketer, and his wife, Doris Irene Kirsop (née Harris).

After attending North Sydney Boys High, he went in 1950 to the University of Sydney from which he graduated in 1955 with first class honours in both French and German. He undertook research for a doctorate at the Sorbonne in Paris, France, and in 1960 successfully defended his thesis titled "Clovis Hesteau, sieur de Nuysement, et la littérature alchimique de la fin du XVIe siècle et du début du XVIIe siècle" on Clovis Hesteau de Nuysement, a French poet of the Renaissance who wrote several alchemical works.

Kirsop died on 12 August 2026 at the age of 92.

== Academic career ==
Having returned to Australia in 1960, Kirsop worked for two years as a lecturer in French at the University of Sydney. He then moved to Melbourne where he taught French language and literature at Monash University from 1962 until 1998 when he retired. From early in his career at Monash he insisted on a syllabus that moved beyond the normal bounds of French language and literature to include social and cultural history. He also taught advanced undergraduates and postgraduates "reference and physical bibliography" and book history, and he concentrated his research in those fields as well. In his research and teaching he was an advocate for the French Annales school of historiography and for the Anglo-Saxon school of "new bibliography" which had been developed by Sir Walter Wilson Greg, Fredson Bowers and Douglas Francis McKenzie, the latter known in France via his intellectual advocacy as "bibliographie materielle".

In 1980–1981, he held the Sandars Readership in Bibliography at Cambridge University speaking on "Books for Colonial Readers: The Nineteenth Century Australian Experience".

In 1968–2002, Kirsop was editor of the "international, peer-reviewed" Australian Journal of French Studies. He was the founding editor of the Institute for the Study of French-Australian Relations's Explorations journal and was a board member of the Society for the History of Authorship, Reading and Publishing (SHARP).

Following his retirement he was appointed an honorary professorial fellow at Monash and as at 2018 he was "an Adjunct Professor in the School of Languages, Literatures, Cultures and Linguistics" at the same university. He taught book history at several Melbourne Rare Book Week events. In 2008 he was Honorary Director of Monash University's Centre for the Book. The Bibliographical Society of Australia and New Zealand named one of its awards as the "Wallace Kirsop Conference Bursary" as a founding member of the society and a "distinguished member" since 1969.

He was elected a fellow of the Australian Academy of the Humanities in 1980.

Kirsop and his wife together owned some 20,000 books, housed in their home and a nearby apartment. He donated many rare books to the State Library of Victoria and bequeathed the remainder to it.

== Awards ==
- 1973: Chevalier dans l'Ordre des Palmes académiques
- 1999: Doctor of Letters (honoris causa) – University of Sydney
- 2003: Officier dans l'Ordre des Palmes académiques

== Select bibliography ==
=== Books: As author ===
- Towards a History of the Australian Book Trade (Sydney: Wentworth Books, 1969)
- Research on Western European Languages and Literatures in Australia Since 1958 (Sydney: Sydney University Press, 1975)
- Books for Colonial Readers: The Nineteenth-century Australian Experience, Melbourne, The Bibliographical Society of Australia and New Zealand in association with The Centre for Bibliographical and Textual Studies, Monash University, 1995 (BSANZ Occasional Publication No. 5).
- Catering for the Empire: Reactions to Macmillan's Colonial Library, Clayton, Victoria: Ancora Press, 2009.

=== Books: As editor ===
- John Pascoe Fawkner's Library. Facsimile of the Sale Catalogue of 1868, with an introductory essay by Wallace Kirsop (Melbourne: Book Collectors' Society of Australia, 1985)
- The Book in Australia: Essays Towards a Cultural and Social History, Clayton : Australian Reference Publications in association with the Centre for Bibliographical and Textual Studies, Monash University, 1988. Joint editor: D. H. Borchardt.

=== Articles ===
- "The Legend of Bernard Palissy", in: Ambix, 1961, Volume 9, Issue 3.
- "Brennan, critic and scholar", in: Southerly, Vol. 23, No. 3, September 1963: 203–210.
- "The bibliography of French literary history: progress, problems, projects", in: Australian Journal of French Studies, 1 (1964): 325–364.
- "The Family of Love in France", in: Journal of Religious History, December 1964.
- "Vers une collaboration de la bibliographie matérielle et de la critique textuelle", in: Australian Journal of French Studies, 3 (1966): 227–251.
- "The Greatest Renewal, the Greatest Revelation: Brennan's Commentary on Mallarmé", in: Meanjin Quarterly, Vol. 29, No. 3, 1970: 303–311.
- "Literary History and Book Trade History: the Lessons of L'Apparition du livre", in: Australian Journal of French Studies, 16 (1979): 488–535.
- "Lucien Febvre and the Annales", Australian Journal of French Studies, 1979.
- "The State of the Discipline: Booksellers and Their Customers: Some Reflections on Recent Research", in: Book History, vol. 1, 1998, 283–303.
- "Behind the Scenes in Publishing in Nineteenth- and Early Twentieth-Century Australia", in: Russell, Mary, ed., The Indexing Life: Australian and New Zealand Society of Indexers Conference, 15–17 March 2007, Melbourne: Australian and New Zealand Society of Indexers Conference, 2007, 22–28.
- "Libraries for an imperial power", in: Giles Mandelbrote and K. A. Manley, eds., The Cambridge History of Libraries in Britain and Ireland, Volume 2: 1640–1850, Cambridge University Press, 2009.
- "Traditions: Tyranny and Freedom", isfar.org.au, 2016.

=== Books about Wallace Kirsop ===
- David Garrioch et al., eds., The Culture of the Book: Essays from Two Hemispheres in Honour of Wallace Kirsop, Melbourne: Bibliographical Society of Australia and New Zealand, 1999.

For more comprehensive lists of Kirsop's books and articles, see Wallace Kirsop: Outputs (Monash University) and "Wallace Kirsop: List of Publications", in: David Garrioch et al., eds., The Culture of the Book... (1999), xv–xxx.
