= Edward Gordon Duff =

British bibliographer and librarian

- Born: 16 February 1861; Liverpool, England
- Died: 28 September 1924 (aged 63); Oxford, Oxfordshire, England
- Education: Cheltenham College; Wadham College, Oxford
- Occupations: Bibliographer; Librarian

Edward Gordon Duff (16 February 1863 – 28 September 1924), known as Gordon Duff, was a British bibliographer and librarian known for his works on early English printing.

== Career ==
Duff was born in Liverpool on 16 February 1863. He was educated at Cheltenham College and Wadham College, Oxford, where he took a degree in classics in 1887.

Duff began work on a catalogue of incunabula in the Bodleian Library but did not finish the project. In 1893 Enriqueta Augustina Rylands appointed Duff her librarian. From 1893 to 1899, he compiled the first catalogue of the John Rylands Library, Catalogue of the Printed Books and Manuscripts in the John Rylands Library, Manchester (Manchester: J. E. Cornish, 1899). Henry Guppy was appointed joint librarian in 1899. Duff resigned from his position at the John Rylands Library in October 1900 and, for the rest of his life, he supported himself by doing freelance work and by taking academic appointments.

He was Sandars Reader in Bibliography at the University of Cambridge in 1903 and spoke on "The printers, stationers and book-binders of London, 1500–1535." and again in 1911 speaking on "English provincial printers, stationers and book-binders to 1557."

Duff died at his home in Oxford on 28 September 1924.

== Major works ==
- Early Printed Books. London: Kegan Paul, Trench, Trübner & Co., 1893.
- Catalogue of Books in the John Rylands Library, Manchester, Printed in England, Scotland and Ireland, and of Books in English Printed Abroad to the End of the Year 1640. Manchester: J. E. Cornish, 1895.
- Early English Printing. London: Kegan Paul, Trench, Trübner & Co., 1896.
- Catalogue of the Printed Books and Manuscripts in the John Rylands Library, Manchester. 3 vols. 4to. Manchester: J. E. Cornish, 1899.
- A Century of the English Book Trade: Short Notices of All Printers, Stationers, Book-binders, and Others Connected with it from the Issue of the First Dated Book in 1457 to the Incorporation of the Company of Stationers in 1557. London: Printed for the Bibliographical Society, by Blades, East & Blades, 1905.
- William Caxton. Chicago: Caxton Club, 1905.
- The Printers, Stationers and Bookbinders of Westminster and London from 1476 to 1535. Cambridge: University Press, 1906.
- The English Provincial Printers, Stationers and Bookbinders to 1557. (Sandars Lectures; 1911.) Cambridge: University Press, 1912.
- Fifteenth Century English Books: a Bibliography of Books and Documents Printed in England and of Books for the English Market Printed Abroad. (Illustrated Monographs; 18.) [London]: Printed for the Bibliographical Society at the Oxford University Press, 1917.
  Revised edition: Printing in England in the Fifteenth century, a reprint of E. Gordon Duff, Fifteenth Century English Books, with supplementary material compiled by Dr Lotte Hellinga. Published by the Bibliographical Society in collaboration with the British Library, 2009.
