= Sandars Lectures =

Annual lecture series in bibliography given at Cambridge University

The Sandars Readership in Bibliography is an annual lecture series given at Cambridge University. Instituted in 1895 at the behest of Samuel Sandars of Trinity College (1837–1894), who left a £2000 bequest to the University, the series has continued to the present day. Together with the Panizzi Lectures at the British Library and the Lyell Lectures at Oxford University, it is considered one of the major British bibliographical lecture series.

== Lectures ==
=== 1890s ===
- 1895: Sir Edward Maunde Thompson. Greek, Latin and English handwriting.
- 1896: C. H. Middleton-Wake. The invention of printing.
- 1897: W. H. Stevenson. Anglo-Saxon Chancery.
- 1898: E. Gordon Duff. The printers, stationers and book-binders of Westminster and London in the 15th century.
- 1899: J. W. Clark. The care of books (to the end of the 18th century).

=== 1900–1925 ===
- 1900: F. G. Kenyon. The development of Greek writing, BC 300–AD 900.
- 1901: Henry Yates Thompson. English and French illustrated MSS. of the 13th–15th centuries.
- 1902: M. R. James. Manuscripts in Cambridge.
- 1903: E. Gordon Duff. The printers, stationers and book-binders of London, 1500–1535.
- 1904: H. Y. Thompson. Illustrated MSS. of the 11th century.
- 1905: Sir Edward Maunde Thompson. The history of illumination and ornamentation of MSS.
- 1906: F. W. Maitland. [Did not lecture]
- 1907–1908: F. J. H. Jenkinson. Books printed at Cologne by U. Zell.
- 1909: Falconer Madan. The localisation and dating of MSS.
- 1910: W. M. Lindsay. Latin Abbreviations.
- 1911: E. Gordon Duff. English provincial printers, stationers and book-binders to 1557.
- 1912: Arthur Ernest Cowley. The Papyri of Elephantine.
- 1913: W. W. Greg. Some bibliographical and textual problems of the English Miracle-play Cycles.
- 1914: Elias Avery Lowe. (1) Characteristics of the so-called National Scripts. (2) Punctuation and critical marks as aids in dating and placing MSS. (3) Graeco-Latin manuscripts. (4) The Codex Bezae and the Codex Laudianus.
- 1915: A. W. Pollard. The conditions of printing and publishing in Shakespeare’s day in their relation to his text.
- 1916–1920: [Lectures suspended]
- 1921: E. Wyndham Hulme. Statistical bibliography in relation to the growth of modern civilisation.
- 1922: W. C. Bolland. Readings on the Year Books.
- 1923: M. R. James. The pictorial illustration of the Old Testament from the 14th Century to the 16th.
- 1924: Emery Walker. Printing for book production.
- 1925: Ellis Hovell Minns. The influence of materials and instruments upon writing.

=== 1926–1950 ===
- 1926: A. J. K. Esdaile. Elements of the bibliography of English literature, materials and methods.
- 1927: G. D. Hobson. English leather bindings down to 1500.
- 1928: R. B. McKerrow. The relationship of English printed books to authors’ manuscripts in the 16th and 17th centuries.
- 1929: S. De Ricci. English collectors of books and MSS., 1550–1900, and their marks of ownership.
- 1930: Victor Scholderer. The invention of printing: facts and theories.
- 1931: Stanley Morison. The English newspaper: some account of the physical development of the journals printed in London from 1622 down to the present day.
- 1932: J. Dover Wilson. The Hamlet texts, 1604 and 1623.
- 1933: Geoffrey Keynes. John Evelyn: a study in bibliography.
- 1934: E. G. Millar. Some aspects of the comparative study of illuminated MSS.
- 1935: Stephen Gaselee. Bibliography and the Classics.
- 1936: C. A. Gordon. Manuscript missals; the English uses.
- 1937: Michael Sadleir. Bibliographical aspects of the Victorian novel.
- 1938: C. J. Sisson. The judicious marriage of Mr Hooker and the birth of ‘the Laws of Ecclesiastical Polity’.
- 1939: H. R. Creswick. Some recent work on early English printed books.
- 1940–1946: [Lectures suspended]
- 1947: John Carter Taste and technique in book collecting: a study of recent developments in Great Britain and the United States.
- 1948: F. Wormald. The Miniatures in the Gospels of St Augustine: Corpus Christi College MS. 286.
- 1949: J. Basil Oldham. English blind-stamped bindings.
- 1950: Harold Herbert Williams. The text of Gulliver’s Travels.

=== 1951–1975 ===
- 1951: H. S. Bennett. English books and readers 1475 to 1557; being a study in the history of the book trade from Caxton to the incorporation of the Stationers’ Company.
- 1952: J. C. T. Oates. The history of the collection of incunabula in the University Library.
- 1953: E. P. Goldschmidt. The first Cambridge press in its European setting.
- 1954: S. C. Roberts. The evolution of Cambridge publishing.
- 1955: N. R. Ker. Oxford libraries in the sixteenth century.
- 1956: Wilmarth S. Lewis. Horace Walpole’s Library.
- 1957: Fredson T. Bowers. Textual criticism and the literary critic.
- 1958: H. Graham Pollard. English market for printed books.
- 1959: R. W. Hunt. Manuscripts of the Latin classics in England in the Middle Ages.
- 1960: C. H. Roberts. The earliest manuscripts of the Church: style and significance.
- 1961: A. H. King. Some British collectors of music, 1600–1960.
- 1962: F. J. Norton. Printing in Spain 1500–1520.
- 1963: J. H. A. Sparrow. The inscription and the book.
- 1964: William T. Stearn. Bibliography in the service of biology.
- 1965: J. C. T. Oates. Abraham Wheelock (1593–1653): Orientalist, Anglo-Saxonist and University Librarian.
- 1966: S. Smith. The Darwin Collection in Cambridge University Library.
- 1967:Howard Millar Nixon. English bookbinding in the Restoration period.
- 1968: Bruce Dickins. Corpus Christi College, the Parker Library.
- 1969: A. N. L. Munby. Gothick into art: connoisseurship and medieval miniatures, 1750–1850.
- 1970: J. S. L. Gilmour. Some freethinkers and their writings.
- 1971: F. J. Stopp. Monsters and hieroglyphs: the broadsheet and emblem book in sixteenth century Germany.
- 1972–1973: M. A. Hoskin. Virtues and vices of scientific manuscripts.
- 1973–1974: John Simon Gabriel Simmons. Russian printing from the beginnings to 1917: a view from the West.
- 1974–1975: A. R. A. Hobson Some book collectors, booksellers and binders in sixteenth century Italy.

=== 1976–2000 ===
- 1975–1976: D. F. Mackenzie. The London book trade in the later seventeenth century.
- 1976–1977: J. M. Wells. Two hundred years of American printing, 1776–1976.
- 1977–1978: D. F. Foxon. The Stamp Act of 1712.
- 1978–1979: Philip Gaskell. Trinity College Library: the first 150 years.
- 1979–1980: J. G. Dreyfus. British book typography 1889–1939.
- 1980–1981: Wallace Kirsop. Books for colonial readers — The nineteenth century Australian experience.
- 1981–1982: W. H. Bond. Thomas Hollis of Lincoln’s Inn: collector, designer, and patron.
- 1982–1983: Ruari McLean. Moxon to Morison: The growth of typography as a profession.
- 1983–1984: P. C. G. Isaac. William Bulmer, 1757–1830: ‘fine’ printer.
- 1984–1985: J. J. G. Alexander. Artists and the book in Padua, Venice and Rome in the second half of the fifteenth century.
- 1986–1987: Professor R. A. Leigh. Unsolved problems in the bibliography of J. J. Rousseau.
- 1987–1988: Dorothy Owen. The medieval canon law: teaching, literature and transmission.
- 1988–1989: F. W. Ratcliffe. A pre-Lutheran German psalter: A case study of a fourteenth-century work.
- 1989–1990: R. I. Page. Matthew Parker, Archbishop of Canterbury, and his books.
- 1990–1991: D. S. Brewer. The fabulous history of Venus: Studies in the history of mythography from the Middle Ages to the nineteenth century.
- 1991–1992: G. G. Watson. Lord Acton and his library.
- 1992–1993: Will Carter. Gutenberg’s legacy.
- 1993–1994: Bamber Gascoigne. From priceless perfection to cheap charm: stages in the development of colour printing.
- 1994–1995: D. J. Bruce. ‘The real Simon Pure’: The life and work of George Cruikshank.
- 1995–1996: J. Harley-Mason. The Age of Aquatint: a chapter in the history of English book illustration.
- 1995–1996: A. Derolez. Textualis formata.
- 1996–1997: G. Thomas Tanselle. Analytical bibliography: an historical introduction.
- 1997–1998: G. G. Barber. Bibliography with rococo roses: The 1755 La Fontaine Fables choisies and the arts of the book in eighteenth-century France.
- 1998–1999: Patricia Donlon. In Fairyland: Irish illustrators of children’s books.
- 1999–2000: Nicolas Barker. Type and type-founding in Britain 1485–1720.

=== 2001–2025 ===
- 2000–2001: D. J. McKitterick. Printing versus publishing: Cambridge University Press and Greater Britain 1873–1914.
- 2001–2002: C. Fahy. Paper in the sixteenth-century Italian printing industry.
- 2002–2003: M. Foot. Description, image and reality: aspects of bookbinding history.
- 2003–2004: Christopher de Hamel. "Sir Sydney Cockerell and Illuminated Manuscripts."
- 2004–2005: Paul Needham. Fifteenth-century printing: the work of the shops.
- 2005–2006: James H. Marrow. Word-diagram-picture: the shape of meaning in medieval books.
- 2006–2007: Sarah Tyacke. Conversations with maps.
- 2007–2008: Peter Kornicki. Having difficulty with Chinese? — The rise of the vernacular book in Japan, Korea and Vietnam.
- 2008–2009: Michelle P. Brown. The book and the transformation of Britain, c. 550–1050.
- 2009–2010: Gordon Johnson. From printer to publisher: Cambridge University Press transformed, 1950 to 2010.
- 2010–2011: James Carley. From private hoard to public repository: archbishops John Whitgift and Richard Bancroft as founders of Lambeth Palace Library.
- 2011–2012: Michael Reeve. Printing the Latin Classics — Some episodes.
- 2012–2013: James A. Secord. Visions of science: books and readers at the dawn of the Victorian age.
- 2013–2014: Nigel Morgan. Samuel Sandars as collector of illuminated manuscripts.
- 2014–2015: Richard Beadle. Henry Bradshaw and the foundations of codicology.
- 2015–2016: Anthony Grafton. Writing and reading history in Renaissance England: some Cambridge examples.
- 2016–2017: Toshiyuki Takamiya. A cabinet of English treasures: Reflections on fifty years of book collecting.
- 2017–2018: Peter Wothers. Chemical attractions.
- 2018–2019: William Noel. The medieval manuscript and its digital image.
- 2019–2020: Isabelle de Conihout. French bookbindings and bibliophily, 16th–18th centuries.
- 2020–2021: Orietta Da Rold. Paper past and paper future.
- 2021–2022: Cristina Dondi. Incunabula in Cambridge: European heritage and global dissemination.
- 2022–2023: David Pearson. Cambridge Bookbinding, 1450–1700.
- 2024 Timothy Young. Resistance to Bibliography
- 2025 Joan Winterkorn. What will survive of us - the evolution of buying and selling of archives since the 1970s.

=== 2026-2050 ===
- 2026 Marina Rustow. Flax to Folio: The Global Diffusion of Early Paper and the History of Textiles.

== See also ==
- A.S.W. Rosenbach Lectures in Bibliography
- E. A. Lowe Lectures
- Lyell Lectures
- McKenzie Lectures
- Panizzi Lectures
