= Vaktruttvottejak Sabha =

Vaktrutvottejak Sabha is an organization best known for hosting the Vasant Vyakhyanmala (the traditional annual spring lecture series) every year since 1875 in Pune, India. Justice Mahadeo Govind Ranade founded Vaktrutvottejak Sabha. Currently, Dr. Deepak Jayantrao Tilak is President of Vaktrutvottejak Sabha.

== Vasant Vyakhyanmala ==
Vasant Vyakhyanmala
- Formation: 1875
- Type: Traditional annual spring lecture series
- Location: Pune, India
- Leader: Dr. Deepak Jayantrao Tilak (President), Dr. Mandar Bedekar (Chief Organizer)

The idea behind the series was to present a variety of lectures, across various topics to the people. In the later half of 19th century newspapers were primitive and live lectures were the most effective medium for knowledge transfer. Subjects from diverse fields like cultural, social, science, health, literature, finance, law, education, youth and history are covered in the lecture series usually organized at Tilak Smarak Mandir. For many years, the Vasant Vyankhyanmala was held at Hirabag and Belbag. It has been held at its present venue – Tilak Smarak Mandir, for many decades. The Vyakhanmala is held every year in the month of April or May i.e. Spring (Vasant Rutu/Season).

=== Speakers ===
Speakers are chosen from a diverse range of fields like doctors, entrepreneurs, writers, politicians and scholars who consider contemporary issues at the intersection of social issues, culture, science, health, literature, law, education, economy from a critical perspective.
