= William Kirsop =

English footballer

Personal information
- Full name: William Stobbs Kirsop
- Date of birth: 28 March 1891
- Place of birth: Jarrow, England
- Date of death: 1960 (aged 69)
- Place of death: Barnet, Hertfordshire, England
- Height: 5 ft 9 in (1.75 m)
- Position: Outside forward

Senior career*
Years	Team	Apps	(Gls)
- Rosehill Villa
- Wallsend Park Villa
- New Hartley Rovers
1912–1914	Kilmarnock	9	(1)
1913–1914	Gateshead Town		
1914–1919	Barnsley	3	(0)
1919–1920	Darlington		
- * Club domestic league appearances and goals

William Stobbs Kirsop (28 March 1891 – 1960) was an English footballer who played as an outside forward in the Scottish League for Kilmarnock and in the English Football League for Barnsley. He also played non-league football for clubs including Rosehill Villa, Wallsend Park Villa, New Hartley Rovers, Gateshead Town and Darlington.

== Life and career ==
Kirsop was born in Jarrow, County Durham, in early 1891, the son of Richard Kirsop, a bricklayer, and his wife Alice. He played local football for Rosehill Villa, Wallsend Park Villa and New Hartley Rovers before signing for Scottish club Kilmarnock in 1912. He made his debut on 17 August in a 2–1 win at home to Partick Thistle in Division One, and scored his first goal for the club a month later in a 2–0 league defeat of Third Lanark. He played nine matches altogether before the turn of the year, but none for the first team thereafter. His play for the reserves in March 1913 prompted the Scottish Referee's correspondent to suggest that "Kirsop, the young English lad, who joined Kilmarnock as a forward, promises to develop into a clever half-back". At the end of the season, Kilmarnock retained Kirsop's league registration but allowed him to return to England where he signed for North-Eastern League club Gateshead Town.

He soon impressed: in October he was selected for the Rest of the League XI to face the North-Eastern League champions Darlington in an exhibition game, and by December he was being linked with a move either back to Kilmarnock or to another Scottish top-flight club, Aberdeen. He scored 11 goals during the 1913–14 season for Gateshead, and then signed for English Second Division club Barnsley. Kirsop made his English Football League debut on 2 September 1914 in a 7–0 defeat away to Derby County, and played twice more that month, but those were his last appearances in league football.

Kirsop, who had worked as a plater's labourer in a shipyard before taking up football professionally, engaged in munitions work during the First World War. Still on Barnsley's books after the war, he was invited back for a match with Sheffield Wednesday in April 1919, but did not turn up. Kirsop was one of many former league players who signed on for the re-formed Darlington club to play in the post-war Victory Leagues and remained with them when the North-Eastern League resumed in 1919–20. He played in that season's FA Cup first round replay in which Darlington beat First Division Sheffield Wednesday 2–0 to progress to the last 32 of the competition.

== Notes ==
- The English National Football Archive list the player's name as William Smeaton Kirsop, but the release issued to the Sheffield press when he signed for Barnsley names him as William Stobbs Kirsop.
