= McKenzie Lectures =

The McKenzie Lectures are a series of annual public lectures delivered by "a distinguished scholar on the history of the book, scholarly editing, or bibliography and the sociology of texts." The lectures are held in Oxford at the Centre for the Study of the Book (Bodleian Libraries). The series was inaugurated in 1996, in honour of Donald Francis McKenzie (1931–1999), upon his retirement as Professor of Bibliography and Textual Criticism, University of Oxford.

== Lectures ==
- 1996 David McKitterick: Printers in the Marketplace
- 1997 Roger Chartier: Foucault’s Chiasmus: Authorship between Science and Literature
- 1998 Joseph Viscomi: Blake’s Graphic Imagination: the Technical and Aesthetic Origins of Blake’s Illuminated Books
- 1999 Lawrence Rainey: The Cultural Economy of Modernism
- 2000 Harold Love: The Intellectual Heritage of Donald Francis McKenzie
- 2001 Patricia Clements and Isobel Grundy: Women’s Literary History by Electronic Means. the creation and communication of meaning in the Orlando Project
- 2002 Paul Needham: The Discovery and Invention of the Gutenberg Bible
- 2003 Laurel Brake: 'Daily Calendars of Roguery and Woe’. The Politics of Print in 19th-century Britain
- 2004 Graham Shaw: In or Out? — South Asia and a Global History of the Book
- 2005 John Barnard: Keats and Posterity: Manuscript, Print, and Readers
- 2006 Gary Taylor: The Man Who Made Shakespeare. England’s First Literary Publisher
- 2007 Robert Darnton: Bohemians before Bohemianism: Grub Street Libertines in Paris and London 1770–1789 — Keats and Posterity; Manuscript, Print, and Readers
- 2008 Isabel Hofmeyr: Gandhi’s Printing Press: Print Cultures in the Indian Ocean
- 2009 Jerome McGann: Philology in a New Key: Information Technology and the Transmission of Culture
- 2010 Henry Woudhuysen: A. W. Pollard (1859–1944): Friends and Fine Printing
- 2011 Paul Eggert: Brought to Book: Book History and the Idea of Literature
- 2012 John B. Thompson: Merchants of Culture
- 2013 Xu Bing: The Sort of Artist I Am
- 2014 William Noel: Bibliography in Bits: the study of books in the twenty-first century
- 2015 Sheldon Pollock: Editing in India: the First 1500 years
- 2016 Gisèle Sapiro: Authorship in Transnational Perspective
- 2017 Peter Kornicki: Publish and Perish in Japan: Why manuscripts continued to circulate in the age of print
- 2019 Kate Nation: Learning to Read: linking biology and culture via cognition
- 2020 Kathryn Sutherland, Dirk van Hulle, Peter D. McDonald; Richard Ovenden (Chair): McKenzie 25 years on: anniversaries, legacies, reflections
- 2021 Francesca Orsini: The magazine and world literature
- 2022 Richard Ovenden: Photography and the Book
- 2023 Matthew G. Kirschenbaum: The New Nature of the Book: Publishing and Printing in the Post-Digital Era
- 2024: Mary Mount and Peter Straus: Editing and publishing in the 21st century

== See also ==
- A.S.W. Rosenbach Lectures in Bibliography
- E. A. Lowe Lectures
- Lyell Lectures
- Panizzi Lectures
- Sandars Lectures
