= Panizzi Lectures =

The Panizzi Lectures are a series of annual lectures given at the British Library by "eminent scholars of the book" and named after the librarian Anthony Panizzi. They are considered one of the major British bibliographical lecture series alongside the Sandars Lectures at the University of Cambridge and the Lyell Lectures at Oxford University.

The first Panizzi Lectures were given by Donald McKenzie in 1985. The series was titled, "Bibliography and the Sociology of Texts." They were "The Book as Expressive Form," "The Broken Phial," and "The Dialectics of Bibliography Now."

Each year, a different book historian delivers three lectures on a topic of their choice, "pertaining to bibliography whether concerning the subjects of palaeography, codicology, typography, bookbinding, book illustration, music, cartography, historical critical and analytical bibliography, or any subject relating directly or indirectly to any of the above subjects". The Panizzi Council, a body of book historians and professionals working in allied fields, chooses speakers three years in advance of each set of lectures.

The series is usually delivered in the winter or fall. A few recent lectures have been recorded, and most of the talks see subsequent publication as scholarly monographs (see individual entries below).

== Lectures ==
=== 2020s series ===
- 2024 — Elizabeth McHenry
- 2023 — Henry Woudhuysen
- 2022 — Jeffrey F. Hamburger — Drawing Conclusions: Diagrams in Medieval Art and Thought
  - Lecture 1 (24 Oct 2022): Maps of the Mind: Diagrams Medieval and Modern
  - Lecture 2 (27 Oct 2022): The Classroom and the Codex: Practical Dimensions of Medieval Diagrams
  - Lecture 3 (01 Nov 2022): Poetry, Play, Persuasion: The Diagrammatic Imagination
- 2021 — Cynthia Brokaw — ‘Spreading Culture Throughout the Land’: Woodblock Publishing and Chinese Book Culture in the Early Modern Era
  - Lecture 1 (30 Nov 2021): Woodblock Publishing in China's First Age of Print
  - Lecture 2 (02 Dec 2021): The Publishing Boom of Early Modern China and Late-Ming Book Culture
  - Lecture 3 (uncertain): The Expansion of Woodblock Publishing and the Rise of the Common Reader
- 2020 — Series postponed to 2021

=== 2010s series ===
- 2019 — Ann Blair — Paratexts and Print in Renaissance Humanism
  - Lecture 1 (2019 Dec 09): The Impact of Printing on Paratexts
  - Lecture 2 (2019 Dec 10): Experiments in Humanist Paratexts
  - Lecture 3 (2019 Dec 12): The Limits of Paratexts
- 2018 — Laurie Maguire — The Rhetoric of the Page: Reading Blank Space
  - Lecture 1 (2018 Nov 20): Reading Blank Space
  - Lecture 2 (2018 Nov 27): Reading &c
  - Lecture 3 (2018 Dec 04): Reading *
- 2017 — Germaine Greer — The Poetry of Sappho
  - Lecture 1 (04 Dec 2017): The Witnesses
  - Lecture 2 (07 Dec 2017): The Glory
  - Lecture 3 (11 Dec 2017): The Shame
- 2016 — Rowan Williams — British Libraries: The Literary World of Post-Roman Britain
  - Lecture 1 (10 Oct 2016): Gildas and the Invention of Britain
  - Lecture 2 (12 Oct 2016): Bede and the Invention of England
  - Lecture 3 (17 Oct 2016): Nennius and the Invention of Wales
- 2015 — David McKitterick — The Invention of Rare Books
  - Lecture 1 (02 Nov 2015): A Seventeenth-Century Revolution
  - Lecture 2 (05 Nov 2015): Selling the Harleian Library
  - Lecture 3 (09 Nov 2015): Private Interest and Public Responsibility
  - Published as: McKitterick, David. The Invention of Rare Books: Private Interest and Public Memory, 1600–1840. Cambridge: Cambridge University Press, 2018.
- 2014 — Christopher de Hamel — The Giant Bibles of Twelfth-Century England
  - Lecture 1 (27 Oct 2014): The Bury Bible
  - Lecture 2 (30 Oct 2014): The Winchester Bible
  - Lecture 3 (03 Nov 2014): The Lambeth Bible
- 2013 — Robert Darnton — Censors at Work: Bourbon France, Imperialist India, and Communist East Germany
  - Lecture 1 (06 Jan 2014): Bourbon France: Privilege and Repression
  - Lecture 2 (07 Jan 2014): British India: Liberalism and Imperialism
  - Lecture 3 (09 Jan 2014): Communist East Germany: Planning and Persecution
  - Published as: Darnton, Robert. Censors at Work: How States Shaped Literature. New York: W.W. Norton & Company, 2014.
- 2012 — Brian Richardson — Women, Books, and Communities in Renaissance Italy
  - Lecture 1 (15 Oct 2012): Circulating Books
  - Lecture 2 (22 Oct 2012): Making and Selling Books
  - Lecture 3 (29 Oct 2012): Acquiring Books
  - Published as: Richardson, Brian F. Women and the Circulation of Texts in Renaissance Italy. Cambridge: Cambridge University Press, 2020.
- 2011 — Robert D. Hume and Judith Milhous — The Publication of Plays in Eighteenth-Century London: Playwrights, Publishers, and the Market
  - Lecture 1 (24 Oct 2011): Money and Readers
  - Lecture 2 (25 Oct 2011): Playwrights
  - Lecture 3 (31 Oct 2011): Publishers, Illustrations, and Tactics
  - Published as: Milhous, Judith, and Robert D. Hume. The Publication of Plays in London: 1660–1800; Playwrights, Publishers, and the Market. The Panizzi Lectures 2011. London: British Library, 2015.
- 2010 — James Raven — London Booksites: Places of Printing and Publication before 1800
  - Lecture 1 (27 Oct 2010): Antient Shops and Conversible Men
  - Lecture 2 (03 Nov 2010): Versatility and the Gloomy Stores of Literature
  - Lecture 3 (10 Nov 2010): Industry, Fashion, and Pettyfogging Drivellers
  - Published as: Raven, James. Bookscape: Geographies of Printing and Publishing in London before 1800. The Panizzi Lectures 2010. London: British Library, 2014.

=== 2000s series ===
- 2009 — Anthony Grafton — The Culture of Correction in Renaissance Europe
  - Published as: Grafton, Anthony. The Culture of Correction in Renaissance Europe. The Panizzi Lectures 2009. London: British Library, 2011.
- 2008 — Nicholas Pickwoad — Reading Bindings: Bindings as Evidence of the Culture and Business of Books
- 2007 — Jonathan J. G. Alexander — Italian Renaissance Illuminated Manuscripts in the Collections of the British Library
- 2006 — Christopher Pinney — The Coming of Photography to India
  - Published as: Pinney, Christopher. The Coming of Photography to India. The Panizzi Lectures 2006. London: British Library, 2008.
- 2005 — Will Ryan — The Magic of Russia
  - Published as: Ryan, William F. Russian Magic Books in the British Library: Books, Manuscripts, Scholars and Travellers. The Panizzi Lectures 2005. London: British Library, 2006.
- 2004 — María Luisa López-Vidriero — The Polished Cornerstones of the Temple: Queenly Libraries of the Enlightenment
  - Published as: López-Vidriero, María Luisa. Polished Cornerstones of the Temple: Queenly Libraries of the Enlightenment. The Panizzi Lectures 2004. London: British Library, 2005.
- 2003 — Antony Griffiths — Prints for Books: French Book Illustration 1760–1800
  - Published as: Griffiths, Anthony. Prints for Books: Book Illustration in France 1760-1800. The Panizzi Lectures 2003. London: British Library, 2004.
- 2002 — Christopher Ricks — T. S. Eliot's Revisions after Publication
  - Published as: Ricks, Christopher. Decisions and Revisions in T. S. Eliot. The Panizzi Lectures 2002. London: British Library, 2003.
- 2001 — Nicolas Barker — ‘Things not reveal’d’: The Mutual Impact of Idea and Form in the Transmission of Verse 2000 B.C.–A.D. 1500
  - Published as: Barker, Nicholas. Things Not Reveal'd Manifestations of Verse from Antiquity to the End of the Middle Ages—The Panizzi Lectures. London: British Library, 2002.
- 2000 — Michael Twyman — Breaking the Mould: The First Hundred Years of Lithography
  - Published as: Twyman, Michael. Breaking the Mould: The First Hundred Years of Lithography. The Panizzi Lectures 2000. London: British Library, 2001.

=== 1990s series ===
- 1999 — Glen Dudbridge — Lost Books of Medieval China
  - Published as: Dudbridge, Glen. Lost Books of Medieval China. The Panizzi Lectures. London: British Library, 2000.
- 1998 — Roger Chartier — Publishing Drama in Early Modern Europe
  - Published as: Chartier, Roger. Publishing Drama in Early Modern Europe. The Panizzi Lectures 1998. London: British Library, 1999.
- 1997 — Mirjam M. Foot — The History of Bookbinding as a Mirror of Society
  - Published as: Foot, Mirjam. A History of Bookbinding as a Mirror of Society: 1997 Panizzi Lectures. Toronto: University of Toronto Press, 1999.
- 1996 — Charles Burnett — The Introduction of Arabic Learning into England
  - Published as: Burnett, Charles. Introduction of Arabic Learning into England. The Panizzi Lectures 1996. London: British Library, 1997.
- 1995 — David Woodward — Maps as Prints in the Italian Renaissance: Makers, Distributors, and Consumers
  - Published as: Woodward, David. Maps as Prints in the Italian Renaissance. The Panizzi Lectures 1995. London: British Library, 1996.
- 1994 — Iain Fenlon — Music, Print, and Culture in Early Sixteenth-Century Italy
  - Published as: Fenlon, Iain. Music, Print and Culture in Early Sixteenth-Century Italy. The Panizzi Lectures 1994. London: British Library, 1995.
- 1993 — Colin G. C. Tite — The Manuscript Library of Sir Robert Cotton
  - Published as: Tite, Colin G.C. The Manuscript Library of Sir Robert Cotton. The Panizzi Lectures 1993. London: British Library, 1994.
- 1992 — Malachi Beit-Arié — Hebrew Manuscripts of East and West: Towards a Comparative Codicology
  - Published as: Beit-Arié, Malachi. Hebrew Manuscripts of East and West: Towards a Comparative Codicology. The Panizzi Lectures 1992. London: British Library, 1993.
- 1991 — Bernhard Fabian — The English Book in Eighteenth-Century Germany
  - Published as: Fabian, Bernhard. The English Book in Eighteenth-Century Germany. The Panizzi Lectures 1991. London: British Library, 1992.
- 1990 — J. B. Trapp — Erasmus, Colet, and More: The Early Tudor Humanists and Their Books
  - Published as: Trapp, J.B. Erasmus, Colet, and More: The Early Tudor Humanists and Their Books. The Panizzi Lectures 1990. London: British Library, 1991.

=== 1980s series ===
- 1989 — J. P. Gumbert — The Dutch and Their Books in the Manuscript Age
  - Published as: Gumbert, J.P. The Dutch and Their Books in the Manuscript Age. The Panizzi Lectures 1989. London: British Library, 1990.
- 1988 — Giles Barber — Daphnis and Chloë: The Markets and Metamorphoses of an Unknown Bestseller
  - Published as: Barber, Giles. Daphnis and Chloe: The Markets and Metamorphoses of an Unknown Bestseller. The Panizzi Lectures 1988. London: British Library, 1989.
- 1987 — K. W. Humphreys — A National Library in Theory and in Practice
  - Published as: Humphreys, K.W. A National Library in Theory and in Practice. The Panizzi Lectures 1987. London: British Library, 1988.
- 1986 — T. A. Birrell — English Monarchs and Their Books: From Henry VII to Charles II
  - Published as: Birrell, T.A. English Monarchs and Their Books: From Henry VII to Charles II. The Panizzi Lectures 1986. London: British Library, 1987.
- 1985 — D. F. McKenzie — Bibliography and the Sociology of Texts
  - Published as: McKenzie, D.F. Bibliography and the Sociology of Texts. The Panizzi Lectures 1985. London: The British Library, 1986.

== See also ==
- A.S.W.Rosenbach Lectures
- E. A. Lowe Lectures
- Lyell Lectures
- McKenzie Lectures
- Sandars Lectures
