= David Foxon =

David Fairweather Foxon, FBA (9 January 1923 – 5 June 2001) was an English bibliographer. Noted for his study of books and literature in 18th-century England, he was the Reader in Textual Criticism at the University of Oxford from 1968 to 1982.

== Early life and education ==
Born in Devon on 9 January 1923, Foxon was the son of a Methodist minister from a family of weavers. He studied at Kingswood School before winning a scholarship to read classics at Magdalen College, Oxford. But, with the outbreak of the Second World War his move to Oxford was interrupted and the headmaster at his school, A. B. Sackett, recommended him to the Government Code and Cypher School. Foxon served in a civilian capacity as a code breaker at Bletchley Park from 1942 to 1944, when he was transferred to Ceylon. After demobilisation, he resumed his studies at Oxford in 1946, reading English; C. S. Lewis was one of his tutors. Graduating with a BA in 1948, he initially began studying towards the BLitt, but opted to join HM Civil Service.

== Career, research, honours and retirement ==
Foxon's civil service career began with a short period in the Ministry of Town and Country Planning, but in 1950 he was appointed an assistant keeper of printed books at the British Museum Library. Remaining there until 1965, he was then a professor of English at Queen's University in Ontario from 1965 to 1967, and then a Guggenheim Fellow for the 1967–68 year. Foxon moved to the University of Oxford in 1968 to be the Reader in Textual Criticism and a fellow of Wadham College. He remained there until retirement in 1982; Foxon was eventually succeeded, in 1986, by Donald McKenzie.

In an obituary in Studies in Bibliography, James McLaverty described Foxon as "perhaps the most distinguished British bibliographer of the second half of the twentieth century." His English Verse, 1701–1750: A Catalogue of Separately Printed Poems with Notes on Contemporary Collected Editions (1975) was ground-breaking.

Foxon's research into English pornography in the late 17th and 18th centuries appeared in a series in The Book Collector in 1963 and were published in a limited edition as The Origins of Pornography in England. These culminated in his book, Libertine Literature in England, 1660–1745.

He wrote The Technique of Bibliography (1955) and, with James McLaverty, he authored Pope and the Early Eighteenth-Century Book Trade (1991). For Gregg Press, Foxon edited reprints of 22 entries in the English Bibliographical Sources series from 1964 to 1968, which included 16th- and 17th-century catalogues of printed books, printers' manuals, and catalogues of new publications from 18th-century periodicals.

He held the Lyell Readership in Bibliography at the University of Oxford for 1975–76 and the Sandars Readership in Bibliography at the University of Cambridge from 1977 to 1979.

In 1978, Foxon was elected a fellow of the British Academy.

He was the president of the Bibliographical Society for the 1980–81 year and was awarded the society's Gold Medal in 1985.

Foxon had met his wife June while they were both serving at Bletchley Park; she was the daughter of the cinema proprietor Sir Arthur Jarrett. They divorced in 1963, having had a daughter. Foxon died on 5 June 2001.

== Selected publications ==
- Foxon, David F, and J McLaverty. 1991. Pope and the Early Eighteenth-Century Book Trade. Oxford England, New York: Clarendon Press ; Oxford University Press.
- Foxon, David F. English Verse 1701 - 1750: A Catalogue of Separately Printed Poems with Notes on Contemporary Collected Editions Vol. 1. Catalogue. 1975. London u.a: Cambridge University Press.
- Foxon, David F. 1966,1965. Libertine Literature in England, 1660-1745. New Hyde Park, N.Y: University Books.
- Foxon, David F, and Lessing J. Rosenwald Reference Collection (Library of Congress). 1959. Thomas J. Wise and the Pre-Restoration Drama: A Study in Theft and Sophistication. London: Bibliographical Society.
- Foxon, David F. 1955. The Technique of Bibliography. Cambridge England: Published for the National Book League at the University Press.
