= Ralph Davis (economic historian) =

English economic historian

Ralph Davis, FBA (30 April 1915 – 30 September 1978) was an English economic historian. An expert on maritime history and English overseas trade, he was the Professor of Economic History at the University of Leicester from 1964 to 1978.

== Early life ==
Born on 30 April 1915, Davis attended Hornsey County School and then trained to become an accountant. Alongside service in the Second World War, he completed the intermediate BSc degree in economics at the University of London in 1942. After the war ended, he resumed his accountancy work while studying in the evenings at the London School of Economics; he funded his final year of study through his own savings and earned a first-class BSc degree in 1949. He then began studying for a PhD in the history of English shipping, which was awarded in 1955.

== Academia ==
In the meantime, Davis accepted a teaching position at the University College, Hull (in 1950). During that time, his PhD thesis was published as The Rise of the English Shipping Industry (1962); he also authored important articles on English overseas trade in the 17th and 18th centuries and wrote Twenty One and a Half Bishop Lane: A History of J. H. Fenner & Co. Ltd., 1861–1961 (1961) and The Trade and Shipping of Hull, 1500–1700 (1964). In 1964, he took up the new Professorship of Economic History at the University of Leicester, which he retained until his death. He authored Aleppo and Devonshire Square (1967), The Rise of the Atlantic Economies (1973) and The Industrial Revolution and Overseas Trade (1979). Davis's scholarly achievements were recognised with election as a fellow of the British Academy in 1973. At Leicester, he also served as pro-vice-chancellor from 1976 and was acting vice-chancellor for the 1976–77 year. He died on 30 September 1978. His wife Dorothy, née Easthope, survived him with their three children; she was prominent in local politics in Leicester and was also an economic historian who wrote A History of Shopping in 1966.
