= Neil Ripley Ker =

English palaeographer (1908–1982)

- Ker in 1959
- Born: 28 May 1908; Brompton, London, England
- Died: 23 August 1982 (aged 74)

Academic background
- Education: Eton College; Magdalen College, Oxford (BA, BLitt)

Academic work
- Discipline: Palaeography
- Institutions: Magdalen College, Oxford; Cambridge University
- Notable works: Catalogue of Manuscripts Containing Anglo-Saxon (1957); Medieval Manuscripts in British Libraries (1969–1977)

Neil Ripley Ker (/kɛər/; 28 May 1908 – 23 August 1982) was a scholar of Anglo-Saxon literature. He was Reader in Palaeography at the University of Oxford and a fellow of Magdalen College, Oxford until he retired in 1968. He is known especially for his Catalogue of Manuscripts Containing Anglo-Saxon, which is praised as a milestone in Anglo-Saxon manuscript study.

== Biography ==
Ker was born in Brompton, London, and was educated at Eton College and Magdalen College, Oxford, completing a BA in English Language and Literature in 1931 and a BLitt in 1933. During the Second World War he was a conscientious objector.

In 1945 he was elected a fellow of Magdalen College and in 1946 University Reader in Palaeography.

Ker was the first Lyell Lecturer in Bibliography at the University of Oxford in 1952-53 on the topic, English Manuscripts in the Century after the Norman Conquest. In 1955 he held the Sandars Readership in Bibliography at Cambridge University and lectured on "Oxford libraries in the sixteenth century."

In 1968 he retired from his roles at Oxford to focus on his largest work, Medieval Manuscripts in British Libraries. He completed the first two volumes and most of the third and left a draft of the fourth.

== Legacy ==
Annually, the British Academy awards grants in Ker's name to scholars who publish books "that include analysis of the distinctive features of original manuscripts."

== Publications (selected) ==
- Ker, N. R. (1941). Medieval libraries of Great Britain, a list of surviving books. Royal historical society guides and handbooks, no. 3. London: Royal historical society. hdl:2027/uiug.30112113075359.
- 1954: Fragments of Medieval Manuscripts Used as Pastedowns in Oxford Bindings, with a Survey of Oxford Binding c.1515–1620.
- 1957: Catalogue of Manuscripts Containing Anglo-Saxon.
- 1960: English Manuscripts in the Century after the Norman Conquest: the Lyell lectures,1952-3.
- Ker, N. R. (1964). Medieval libraries of Great Britain; a list of surviving books. Guides and handbooks, no. 3 (2 ed.). London: Royal Historical Society. hdl:2027/uva.x000937945.
- 1969: Medieval Manuscripts in British Libraries; vol. 1.
- 1977: Medieval Manuscripts in British Libraries; vol. 2.
