= T. A. M. Bishop =

Terence Alan Martyn Bishop, FBA (10 November 1907 – 29 March 1994), known as Alan Bishop and T. A. M. Bishop, was a British palaeographer, historian, and academic, specialising in the Middle Ages. From 1947 to 1973, he was Reader in Palaeography and Diplomatic at the University of Cambridge.

== Biography ==
Bishop was born on 10 November 1907 in Pebsham, Sussex, England. He was educated at Christ's Hospital, then an all-boys private school in Horsham, Sussex. Having been awarded an exhibition, he studied classics at Keble College, Oxford. He achieved a second class in Mods, the first half of Literae Humaniores, in 1928. He then switched to history and graduated with a second class Bachelor of Arts (BA) degree in 1931.

On 15 December 1939, following the outbreak of the Second World War, he volunteered for the British Army. Having attended an Officer Cadet Training Unit, he was commissioned as a second lieutenant in the Royal Artillery on 7 September 1940. He saw active service in West Africa. He was promoted to captain in 1944.

Bishop was a lecturer in medieval history at Balliol College, Oxford, from 1946 to 1947. He was then Reader in Palaeography and Diplomatic in the Department of History, University of Cambridge from 1947 to 1973.

== Honours ==
In 1971, Bishop was elected a Fellow of the British Academy (FBA), the United Kingdom's national academy for the humanities and social sciences.

== Selected works ==
- Bishop, T. A. M.; Chaplais, P., eds. (1957). Facsimiles of English Royal Writs to A.D. 1100: presented to Vivian Hunter Galbraith. Oxford: Clarendon Press.
- Bishop, T. A. M. (1961). Scriptores Regis: facsimiles to identify and illustrate the hands of royal scribes in original charters of Henry I, Stephen, and Henry II. Oxford: Clarendon Press.
- Bishop, T. A. M. (1971). English Caroline Minuscule. Oxford: Clarendon Press. ISBN 978-0-19-818224-5.
