= James Fleming (author) =

English author (1944–2024)

- Born: 26 February 1944; London, England
- Died: 22 November 2024 (aged 80); Cheltenham, England
- Relatives: Ian Fleming (uncle)

James Roland Fleming (26 February 1944 – 22 November 2024) was an English author and editor of the journal The Book Collector from 2018 to 2024. He was the son of Richard Fleming who served in Scottish regiments during World War II (Lovat Scouts and Seaforth Highlanders) and nephew to spy author Ian Fleming.

Fleming lived for the last 20 years in the remote North of Scotland in order to concentrate on his writing. His Charlie Doig Russian series gestated there. He became an honorary "Wicker" in the nearest town to his estate and immersed himself in community life.

He wrote two historical novels, the first in 2000, The Temple of Optimism, which was on the longlist for the 2000 Booker Prize and then in 2003, Thomas Gage, about the coming of the railway to Norfolk in the 1850s.

In 2006 Fleming wrote the first in a trilogy of thrillers, Cold Blood. Two more followed: White Blood (2008) and Rising Blood (2009) that featured the Scottish/Russian character "Charlie Doig."

His 2021 book, Bond behind the Iron Curtain, examined the Russian critique of Ian Fleming.

From 2018 Fleming was the editor of The Book Collector. His essay on the process of indexing the backfile, “The Price of Passion: Indexing The Book Collector," illuminated the journal's history. In 2023 a special issue of The Book Collector was devoted to Printing and the Mind of Man in which Fleming reviewed the correspondence of Percy Muir and John Carter, key organizers of the exhibit.

Fleming died in Cheltenham on 22 November 2024, at the age of 80.

== Works ==
- The Temple of Optimism. Miramax Books. 2000. ISBN 0-7868-6676-4.
- Thomas Gage. Vintage. 2003. ISBN 0-224-07119-X.
- White Blood. Washington Square Press. 2008. ISBN 978-0-7432-9940-4.
- Cold Blood. Washington Square Press. 2009. ISBN 978-1-4165-9651-6.
- Rising Blood. Random House. 2011. ISBN 978-0-224-09135-0.
- Fleming, James. (2018). "Cherry: A Bibliophile in Antarctica." The Book Collector 67 (no 3) Autumn: 499-513.
- Fleming, James (2021). Bond Behind The Iron Curtain. Book Collector. ISBN 978-1-7399120-0-0.

== Bibliography ==
- Personal website - archive.org copy of 16 February 2009
- Author bio on Random House UK website
- Author bio on Simon & Schuster website
- Review of "Cold Blood" in The Times (2009)]
