= Percy Muir =

English antiquarian bookseller (1894–1979)

Percy Horace Muir (1894–1979) was a "distinguished" English antiquarian bookseller, book collector and bibliographer. He became "one of the most respected figures" in the rare books scene, serving as president of both the Antiquarian Booksellers Association and the International League of Antiquarian Booksellers.

== Career ==
Percy Horace Muir was born on 17 December 1894 in London, United Kingdom.

He began his career as a bookseller in the early 1920s and in 1930 joined Elkin Mathews Ltd., the firm of antiquarian booksellers and publishers, as a partner. One of his colleagues while at Elkin Mathews (and also while at Deval & Muir) was the bookseller Laurie E. Deval. Muir became the managing director of Elkin Mathews in 1939. During the Blitz he was responsible for moving the firm to Blakeney, Norfolk.

Over the years his influence grew with booksellers and book collectors across the world. In the years 1945-49 he was president of the Antiquarian Booksellers Association (ABA) in Great Britain. He was the chair of the inaugural conference of the International League of Antiquarian Booksellers (ILAB) in Amsterdam in 1947 and became a major role player in the evolution of the League. In 1950-1952 he was President of the ILAB and later elected as the League's first Life President of Honor.

One of Muir's clients was the British author and book collector Ian Fleming, who would be later known for his James Bond novels. Muir would select books for Fleming who "put himself in Percy’s hands", who said he "wanted to "collect 'books that made things happen', and he left it to Percy to suggest suitable titles". Another book collector influenced by Muir was the Scottish historian of printing, Iain Bain.

Muir authored numerous books and essays on bibliography and on book collecting. He also regularly contributed essays to periodicals such The Colophon, A Book Collectors' Quarterly, the Bibliographical Society's journal The Library, and The Bookman's Journal. He was member of the editorial board of The Book Collector and over several decades he wrote "many reviews for this journal". In 1935-1939 he edited the journal Bibliographical Notes and Queries.

He wrote pioneering works about historical children's books which "helped define the subject as worthy of serious attention". In 1946 he organized a "landmark exhibition" of children's books at the National Book League and wrote an accompanying catalogue, Children's Books of Yesterday. In 1954 he published his English Children's Books, which, according to the critic Andrew Immel, succeeded F. J. Harvey Darton's Children's Books in England: Five Centuries of Social Life (1932) as the standard work on the genre.

Muir was chairman of the historical sub-committee charged with organizing the Earls Court section of the Printing and the Mind of Man exhibition at the International Printing Machinery and Allied Trades Exhibition (IPEX) in 1963. He compiled and co-edited Printing and the Mind of Man: A Descriptive Catalogue Illustrating the Impact of Print on the Evolution of Western Civilization During Five Centuries.

Muir's Victorian Illustrated Books (1971) was among "sympathetic reappraisals of a traditionally undervalued era".

== Personal life ==
Muir was married to Barbara Kaye, who shared his life in the book trade and was herself the author of 14 novels. They had two children, Helen and David. He died on 24 November 1979 at Blakeney, Norfolk, England.

== Selected works ==
- Points, 1874-1930: Being Extracts from a Bibliographer's Note-Book, London: Constable, 1931. Online copy at Wayback Machine
- Book Collecting as a Hobby in a Series of Letters to Everyman, London: Gramol Publications, 1944. Online copy at Wayback Machine
- Children's Books of Yesterday: A Catalogue of an Exhibition Held at 7 Albemarle Street, London During May 1946, London: National Book League, [1946].
- Book-Collecting: More Letters to Everyman, London: Cassell, 1949.
- Talks on Book-Collecting, London: Cassell, 1952.
- English Children's Books, 1600 to 1900, London: Batsford, 1954. Online copy at Wayback Machine
- Minding My Own Business: An Autobiography, London: Chatto & Windus, 1956; New Castle, DE: Oak Knoll, 1991, 2nd edition, with a new foreword. Online copy at Wayback Machine
- Victorian Illustrated Books, London: Batsford, 1971; New York: Praeger, 1971. Online copy at Wayback Machine
- Printing and the Mind of Man: A Descriptive Catalogue Illustrating the Impact of Print on the Evolution of Western Civilization During Five Centuries, "compiled and edited by John Carter & Percy H. Muir, assisted by Nicolas Barker, H. A. Feisenberger, Howard Nixon and S. H. Steinberg, with an introductory essay by Denys Hay", London: Cassell and New York: Holt, Rinehart & Winston, 1967; 2nd edition: Munich, Karl Pressler, 1983. Online copy at Wayback Machine
