= Shelley Society =

Victorian literary society

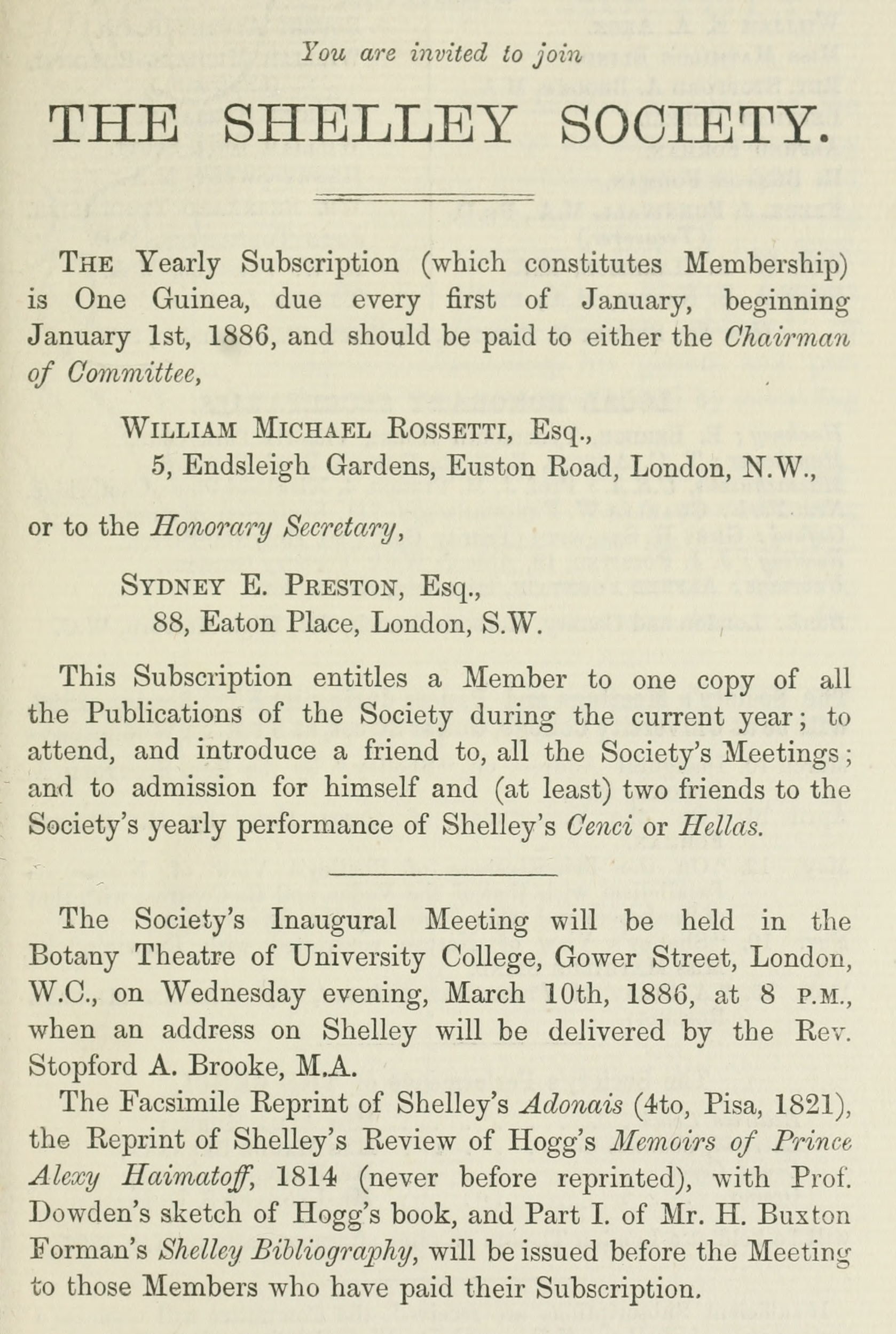
- Shelley Society prospectus
- Formation: 6 December 1885; 140 years ago
- Founder: Frederick James Furnivall
- Dissolved: Early 20th century
- Type: Literary society
- Purpose: Study of Percy Bysshe Shelley
- Headquarters: London, England
- Key people: William Michael Rossetti (chairman of committee); Sydney E. Preston (honorary secretary)

The Shelley Society was a Victorian literary society founded in London in December 1885 by Frederick James Furnivall for the study of Percy Bysshe Shelley. Its activities included public lectures, editions of Shelley's works, serial publications, and sponsored performances, including a private staging of The Cenci in 1886. At its height it had about 400 members. Members and speakers included William Michael Rossetti, Henry S. Salt, George Bernard Shaw, and Mathilde Blind, and women took part in its publications and discussions. Provincial and overseas branches were established. The society declined in the 1890s but continued in reduced form into the early 20th century. Later scholarship has discussed it in relation to late-Victorian "single-author" literary societies, debates over Shelley's radicalism, and reform groups such as the Humanitarian League.

== Founding ==
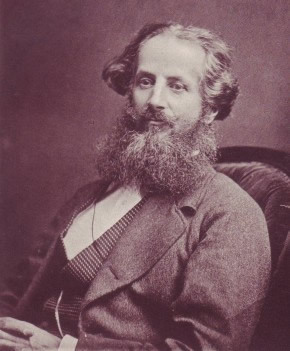
Frederick James Furnivall, founder of the Shelley Society

=== Origins ===
According to contemporary accounts, the idea for a Shelley society was first suggested by Henry Sweet during a walk on Hampstead Heath in late 1885 with Frederick James Furnivall. Furnivall, who had founded other literary societies and worked on the Oxford English Dictionary, took up the suggestion and the following day consulted William Michael Rossetti, who agreed to support the plan.

=== Constitution and committee ===
The Shelley Society was founded on 6 December 1885 under Furnivall's leadership. He and Rossetti decided that it should be open to both men and women on payment of the annual subscription fee of one guinea (equivalent to £116.66 in 2025). The society was constituted for ten years, with Reeves and Turner of the Strand, London, as publishers and R. Clay and Sons of London and Bungay as printers.

Rossetti was appointed chairman of the committee and Sydney E. Preston honorary secretary, while the offices of president and vice-president were left vacant. An interim committee of twenty members, including H. Buxton Forman, John Todhunter, Bertram Dobell, Thomas J. Wise, Stopford A. Brooke, W. A. Harrison, Alfred Forman, and Sweet, was appointed to manage affairs until December 1886, when permanent officers and rules would be selected.

=== Purpose ===
The society's prospectus stated that its purpose was:

to gather the chief admirers of [Shelley] into a body which will work to do his memory honour, by meeting to discuss his writings, qualities, opinions, life, and doings; by getting his plays acted; by reprinting the rarest of his original editions; by facsimiling such of his manuscripts as may be accessible; by compiling a Shelley Lexicon or Concordance; by getting a Shelley Primer published; by generally investigating and illustrating his genius and personality from every side and in every detail; and by extending his influence.

== Activities ==
=== Meetings and lectures ===
The society's prospectus announced that meetings would be held at University College, London, beginning in March 1886. The inaugural meeting took place at the Botany Theatre on 10 March, when Stopford A. Brooke delivered a lecture titled "Shelley as Poet and Man" to an audience of about 500, of whom around 160 were members. The society attracted established literary figures and amateur enthusiasts.

From its first year the society sponsored monthly literary lectures by academic and amateur scholars; contemporary commentary described the meetings as "critical rather than biographical".

In 1890 William E. A. Axon delivered a lecture titled "Shelley's Vegetarianism", which examined Shelley's diet and ethics. He opened with a contemporary definition of vegetarianism and reviewed evidence from Shelley's writings and from contemporaries including Harriet Westbrook, Edward Trelawny, Thomas Jefferson Hogg, and Edward Dowden concerning his diet and health. The following year the lecture was published in pamphlet form by the Vegetarian Society, whose membership overlapped with that of the Shelley Society.

=== The Cenci performance ===
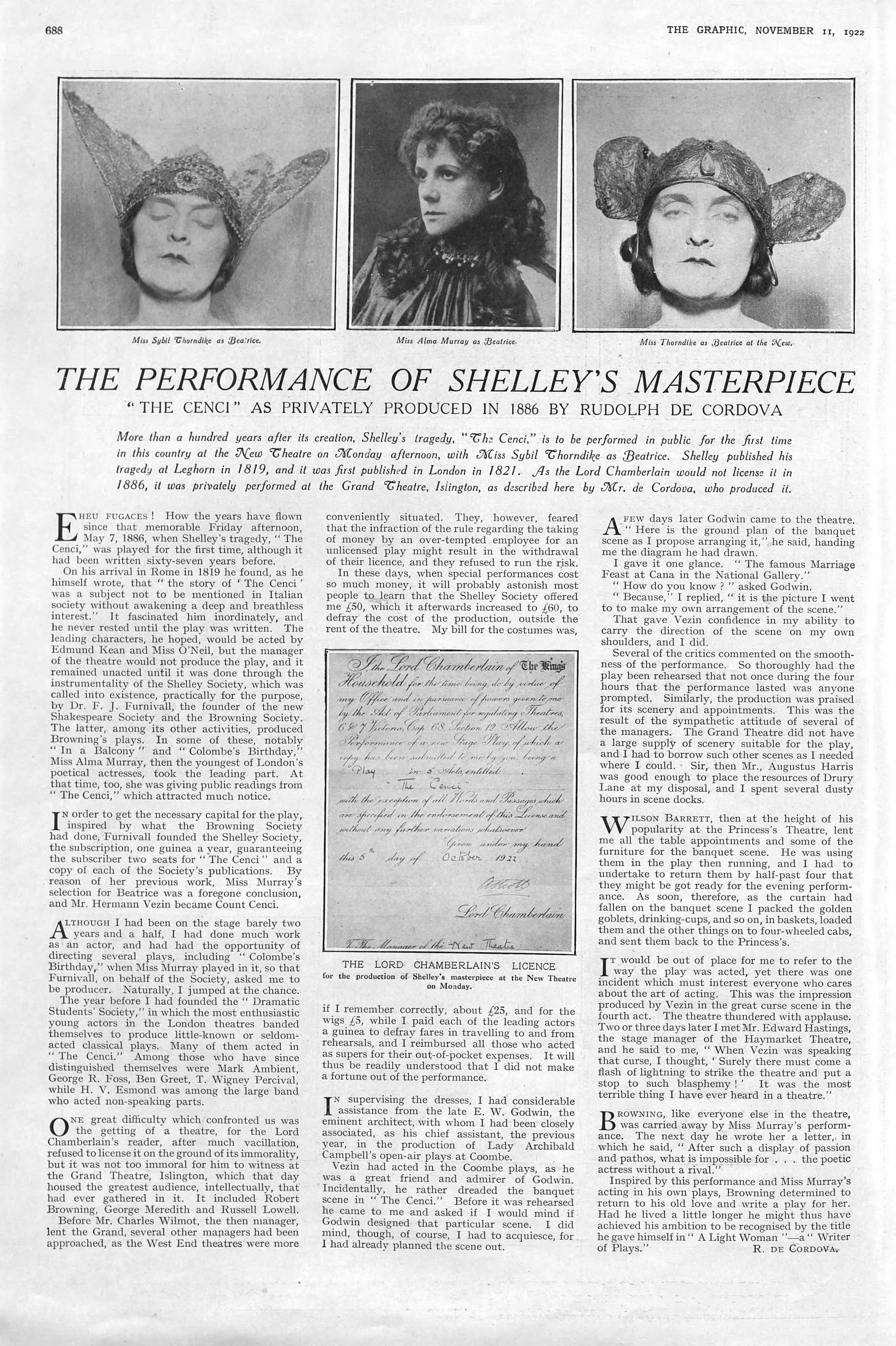
Illustrated article by Rudolph de Cordova on the Shelley Society's performance of The Cenci, published in The Graphic (1922).

On 7 May 1886 the society staged a private performance of The Cenci at the Grand Theatre, Islington, open only to members and invited guests after a public licence was refused. A professional cast was engaged, including Alma Murray as Beatrice and Hermann Vezin as Count Cenci. Members received a printed playbook with prefatory material discussing the play's anti-tyrannical themes. Although admission was restricted, the event received wide press coverage and prompted debate about the propriety of staging a work dealing with incest and parricide before mixed audiences. George Bernard Shaw assisted with publicity and commented on society business in his diaries.

=== Publications ===
The society produced annotated texts, edited and reprinted editions of Shelley's writings, and serial publications such as the Note-Book of the Shelley Society and The Shelley Society's Papers, which printed lectures, discussions, and contributions from members and non-members. Its publications were issued through Reeves and Turner of the Strand, London, with printing by R. Clay and Sons of London and Bungay.

==== Editions of Shelley's works ====
- Hellas: A Lyrical Drama (edited by Thomas J. Wise; 1886)
- The Cenci: A Tragedy in Five Acts (with an introduction by Alfred Forman and H. Buxton Forman, and a prologue by John Todhunter; 1886)
- Review of Hogg's Memoirs of Prince Alexy Haimatoff (edited, with an introductory note by Thomas J. Wise; 1886)
- A Proposal for Putting Reform to the Vote Throughout the Kingdom (with introduction by H. Buxton Forman; 1887)
- Alastor; or, The Spirit of Solitude, and Other Poems (edited by Bertram Dobell; 1887)
- Epipsychidion (with an introduction by Stopford A. Brooke, and a note by Algernon Charles Swinburne, and Robert A. Potts; 1887)
- The Masque of Anarchy (edited by Thomas J. Wise; 1887)
- The Wandering Jew: A Poem (edited by Bertram Dobell; 1887)
- Rosalind and Helen, A Modern Eclogue; With Other Poems (edited by H. Buxton Forman; 1888)
- An Address to the Irish People (edited by Thomas J. Wise; 1890)
- The Masque of Anarchy: A Poem (edited by Thomas J. Wise; 1892)

==== Works about Shelley and the society ====
- A Shelley Primer (by Henry S. Salt; 1887)
- The Shelley Society's Papers (1888)
- Note-Book of the Shelley Society (1888)

== Membership and debates ==
Membership rose rapidly, from 144 within the first three months to about 400 by January 1887, with additional non-members attending meetings. Members and speakers included H. Buxton Forman, William Michael Rossetti, Stopford A. Brooke, Richard Garnett, Henry S. Salt, George Bernard Shaw, Mathilde Blind, John Todhunter, Bertram Dobell, William Bell Scott, Alfred Forman, and Arthur Napier. Women contributed to discussions, and the society's Notebook printed their interventions alongside those of established critics.

At the first regular meeting on 14 April 1886, Shaw declared himself to be "like Shelley, a Socialist, Atheist and Vegetarian", later recalling that two "pious old ladies" who supported Furnivall's societies were so scandalised by the remark that they resigned on the spot.

Internal disputes often concerned Shelley's politics and religion as well as interpretative questions. In March 1887 an application by Edward Aveling was initially rejected on moral grounds before being accepted after protest from Rossetti; in December of that year Aveling and Eleanor Marx presented a paper on "Shelley's Socialism".

== Provincial and overseas branches ==
The society's activities were covered in the press, and provincial branches were established in cities such as Manchester, Birmingham and Liverpool. Overseas branches followed, including in Australia, New Zealand and the United States.

== Decline ==
Financial difficulties and ambitious publishing plans curtailed the society's work in the 1890s. The final literary lecture was delivered in December 1890; the society "technically existed into 1901", and in 1902 committee members were still paying off debts. A contemporaneous retrospective by Walter Edwin Peck argued for a longer effective lifespan: he noted that a 1906 reprint of Shelley's "The Necessity of Atheism" was issued "by arrangement with the Shelley Society".

== Reception and legacy ==
=== Contemporary reception ===
Contemporary discussion of the Shelley Society, both supportive and satirical, made its practices visible, and it became a point of reference in debates about the academic study of English literature and the late-Victorian "single-author" society movement.

=== Political interpretations ===
Graham Henderson argues that the society tended to depoliticise Shelley's radical politics, recasting him as a quasi-religious and spiritual figure, whereas participants such as Henry Stephens Salt, Edward Aveling, Eleanor Marx, and George Bernard Shaw contended that his writings should be understood in explicitly socialist and revolutionary terms. This debate culminated in December 1887 when Aveling and Marx presented their paper on "Shelley's Socialism" to the society.

=== Humanitarian League ===
Many of the founders of the Humanitarian League, established in 1891 by the English socialist Henry S. Salt and others, had previously been members of the society. The League, which drew on pre-Marxian radical traditions, became a forum for ethical arguments for vegetarianism, with Salt and fellow members such as Howard Williams emphasising the moral rather than physiological case for the diet.

=== Shelley Memorial Fund ===
The society's discussions about commemorating Percy Bysshe Shelley's centenary in 1892 helped lead to the Shelley Memorial Fund. J. Stanley Little, who had served as the society's honorary secretary, proposed a public library at Horsham as a memorial. A fundraising appeal signed by literary figures including Lord Tennyson, William Morris, and Henry Irving, was launched but raised little money, and the scheme for a library and museum was abandoned. The collected funds were eventually placed in trust and, after several decades without use, were transferred to West Sussex County Council in 1927 to endow the Shelley Memorial Prize, awarded annually in local schools for achievement in science and letters.
