= Anthony Hobson (book historian) =

British book historian (1921–2014)

Anthony Robert Alwyn Hobson, FBA (5 September 1921 – 12 July 2014) was a British auctioneer and historian, specialising in the history of books.

Hobson was born on 5 September 1921. His wealthy father, Geoffrey Dudley Hobson (1882–1949), had purchased the auction house Sotheby's in 1909 (with Sir Montague Barlow and Felix Warre) and was a renowned historian of books.

== Education and military service ==
Anthony Hobson attended Eton and New College, Oxford.

He went to Sandhurst and joined the Scots Guards in the Second World War. He spent two years at the Intelligence School, Matlock. In 1943 he was posted to Italy during the Italian Campaign and promoted to captain. He was demobilised in 1946.

== Career ==
Hobson joined Sotheby's in 1947 to work in the book department. From 1949 to 1971, he was head of the department and was also a director at Sotheby's. He worked closely with John Carter overseeing major sales such as the Dyson Perrins collection of medieval manuscripts during 1958–1960 and the Phillipps Collections in 1965.

Hobson held The Sandars Readership in Bibliography in 1974–1975 and lectured on "Some book collectors, booksellers and binders in sixteenth century Italy."

He was the Lyell Lecturer in Bibliography at the University of Oxford in 1990–1991 lecturing on "Two Renaissance Book-Collectors: Jean Grolier and Diego Hurtado de Mendoza, Their Libraries and Bookbindings."

He was the Rosenbach Lecturer at the University of Pennsylvania in 1990 on the topic, "The Bibliomania: English Book Collecting in the Early Nineteenth Century."

Hobson was a member of the Roxburghe Club from 1982 until his death.

He was president of the Bibliographical Society from 1977 to 1979 and received the Gold Medal in 1992.

He served as president of the Association Internationale de Bibliophilie from 1985 to 1999.

In 1994 Bookbindings & Other Bibliophily : Essays in Honour of Anthony Hobson. was published to honor his achievements. In 2011 on his 90th birthday “A Garland for Mr. Hobson: Anthony Hobson at 90” was published in The Book Collector.

He was elected Cavaliere of the Order of Merit of the Republic of Italy.

Anthony Hobson died on 12 July 2014.

== Selected publications ==
- French and Italian Collectors and Their Bindings (Oxford: The Roxburghe Club, 1953)
- The Literature of Bookbinding. London: Published for the National Book League by Cambridge University Press, 1954.
- Waddesdon Manor: The Library. London: Shenval Press, 1959.
- Great Libraries (London: Weidenfeld and Nicolson, 1970)
- Apollo and Pegasus: An Enquiry into the Formation and Dispersal of a Renaissance Library (Amsterdam: Gerard Th. Van Heusden, 1975).
- The Art and Life of J.W. Waterhouse RA, 1849–1917. New York: Rizzoli in association with Christie’s.1980.
- Cyril Connolly As a Book Collector. Edinburgh: Tragara Press, 1983.
- Humanists and Bookbinders: The Origins and Diffusion of the Humanistic Bookbinding, 1459–1559 (Cambridge: Cambridge University Press, 1989). Winner of Premio Felice Feliciano.
- "Two Roman Bindings." Bodleian Library Record 15 (1996): 372–382.
- Renaissance Book Collecting: Jean Grolier and Diego Hurtado de Mendoza, their Books and Bindings (Cambridge: Cambridge University Press, 1999).
- "Early Binding Studies and Chimaeras". The Book Collector №60 (Autumn 2011: 385–399).
