= Ashley Library =

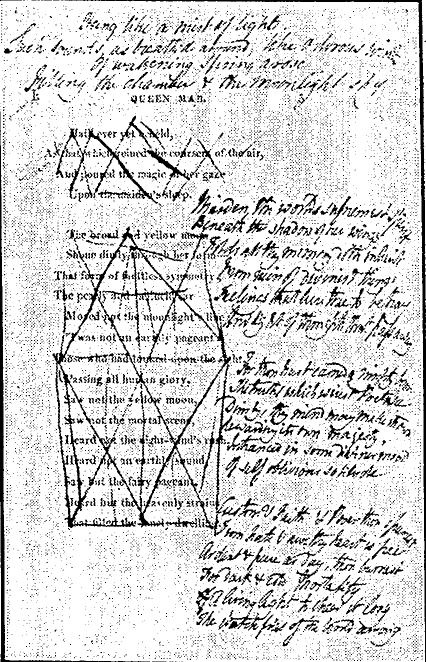
Original leaf from Shelley's copy of Queen Mab, 1813, in the Ashley Library.

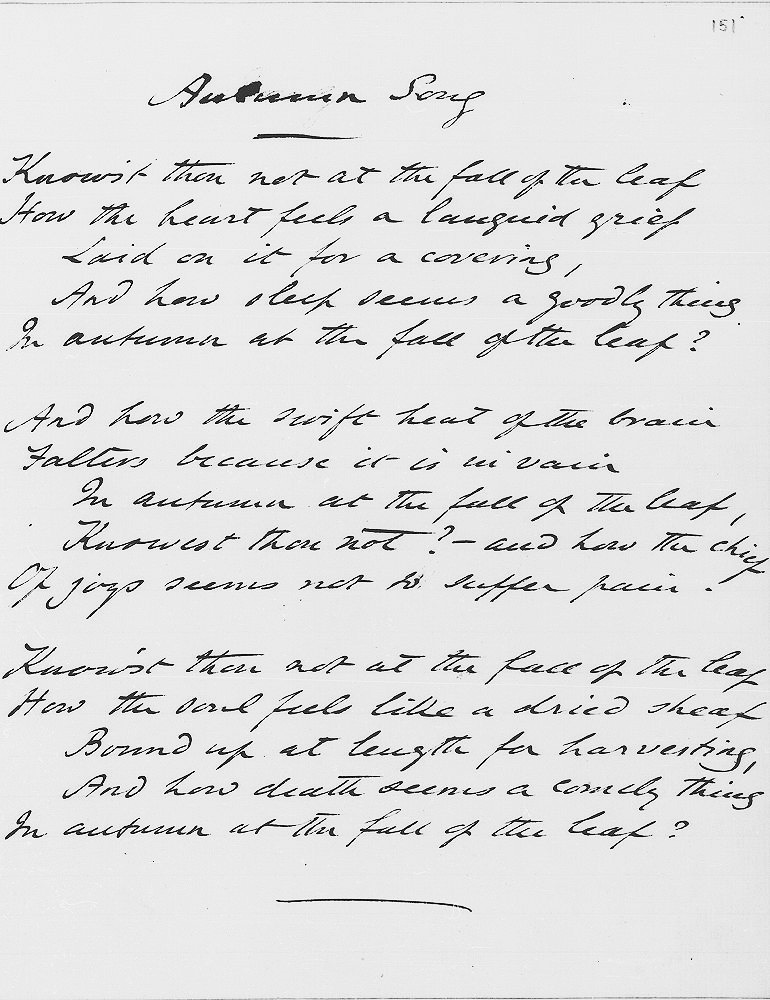
Original manuscript of "Autumn Song" by Dante Gabriel Rossetti, 1848, in the Ashley Library.

The Ashley Library is an important collection of English literature now held at the British Library. It features printed books and manuscripts by writers from the 17th century onwards, collected by the bibliographer, collector, forger, and thief Thomas James Wise. The library was sold to the British Museum by his widow, Frances Louise Greenhaigh Wise, in 1937 for £66,000. (Note: "The purchase consists of about 7,000 volumes, both printed and in manuscript, and no comparable addition to the British Museum Library has been made since 1846, when Thomas Grenville bequeathed his collection.") (Note: "The Ashley Library, which is to be kept together, printed books and manuscripts, is as yet unsorted and temporarily assembled in one of the newly constructed rooms in the West Wing of the Old Library. There it awaits detailed examination and the affixing of the official stamp to each book and document; after which it will be finally arranged, press-marked, and installed in a room adjacent to the King's Library, which is to be specially constructed to contain it in its original book- cases, which have been given by Mrs Wise.") It was named after the street in which Wise lived when he started the collection (Ashley Road, Hornsey Rise).

In book-collecting as in other things, the sum of all is that what interests you is what concerns you. Now to this end and purpose alone I also hold the Ashley Library to be wonderful, but it has an added wonder in that it reveals so exquisite a discrimination and so great a reverence for our masterpieces of literature... the great catalogue of his life's work and love, which is in effect a history of English literature during the last 300 years, may well appear as a blazing star, or an Angel, to his sight.

— Holbrook Jackson

== Scope ==
The Ashley Library is recognized as a significant collection of English literature, with over 5400 early, important and first editions of poetry, prose, drama and literary criticism. It is one of the most important collections of 19th-century English literary manuscripts. The collection spans the period from Coleridge to Conrad, with the emphasis on poetical manuscripts and the correspondence of writers, critics, collectors, and bibliographers. The collection is strong in manuscripts of the Younger Romantics and of the Pre-Raphaelites, together with Swinburne. Wise's lack of scholarship and his practice of dispersing related manuscripts throughout the collection, made it a particularly difficult library to catalog .

== History ==
The original collection consisted of 7,000 volumes with the bookcases used to hold them. When the British Museum library catalogued the collection it was discovered that 200 volumes were missing, it is thought that these were sold by Wise in the 1920s.

Among the collection are also over 100 forgeries and piracies of early editions of nineteenth-century poetry and prose. Wise himself produced these forgeries, working with his associate, the bibliographer and bookseller Harry Buxton Forman, between approximately 1887 and 1900. Facsimile editions – ones printed using old technology and paper, to precisely mimic the physical character of an original edition – were legitimately produced by the Bibliographical Society under Wise’s auspices. However, Wise also used this know-how to produce runs of such imitations with falsified imprints, often predating the genuine first edition. For example, Elizabeth Barrett Browning’s Sonnets from the Portuguese first appeared in print as part of an anthology in 1850. In 1893, Wise had the text printed up with a falsified imprint dated as 1847, and sold these as a rare, newly discovered first edition (Ashley 223, Ashley 4715).

These revelations were revealed by bibliographers John Carter and Graham Pollard in An enquiry into the nature of certain nineteenth century pamphlets, published in 1934 during Wise's lifetime.

The Ashley Library was particularly strong in early printed examples of pre-restoration drama, which Wise had been collecting since 1900. Many years after the British Museum acquired Wise's collection in 1937, it was discovered by bibliographers that the Ashley Library contained over 80 perfected or made-up copies of seventeenth-century drama. At least 23 of these contained pages which Wise had stolen from other copies in the British Museum Library - often from the Garrick Collection of Early English Plays. Henry Wrenn had built up a drama collection (housed in the University of Texas) and Wise had helped with supplying these volumes, when the Texas authorities sent relevant volumes for comparison, 60 of these books were also found to have been completed with thefts from the British Museum library.

In 1959 that a detailed scientific investigation was published by the Bibliographic Society. The conclusion supported the theory that Wise must have known that some of the books leaves added to his collection were stolen and that it was probable that he would have taken the leaves himself. (Note: "In general, it seems likely that Wise would not have risked sharing his guilty knowledge with an emissary but would have made the thefts himself; the rest of this study is written on that assumption.")
