= Thomas Brooker =

Thomas Brooker may refer to:

- Thomas Henry Brooker (1850–1927), politician in colonial South Australia
- Thomas Kimball Brooker (born 1939), American bibliophile, scholar and businessman
- Tommy Brooker (1939–2019), American football player
- Tom Brooker (1908–1988), Australian rules footballer
