= Alfred F. Johnson =

English academic librarian, bibliographer, curator and expert in typography

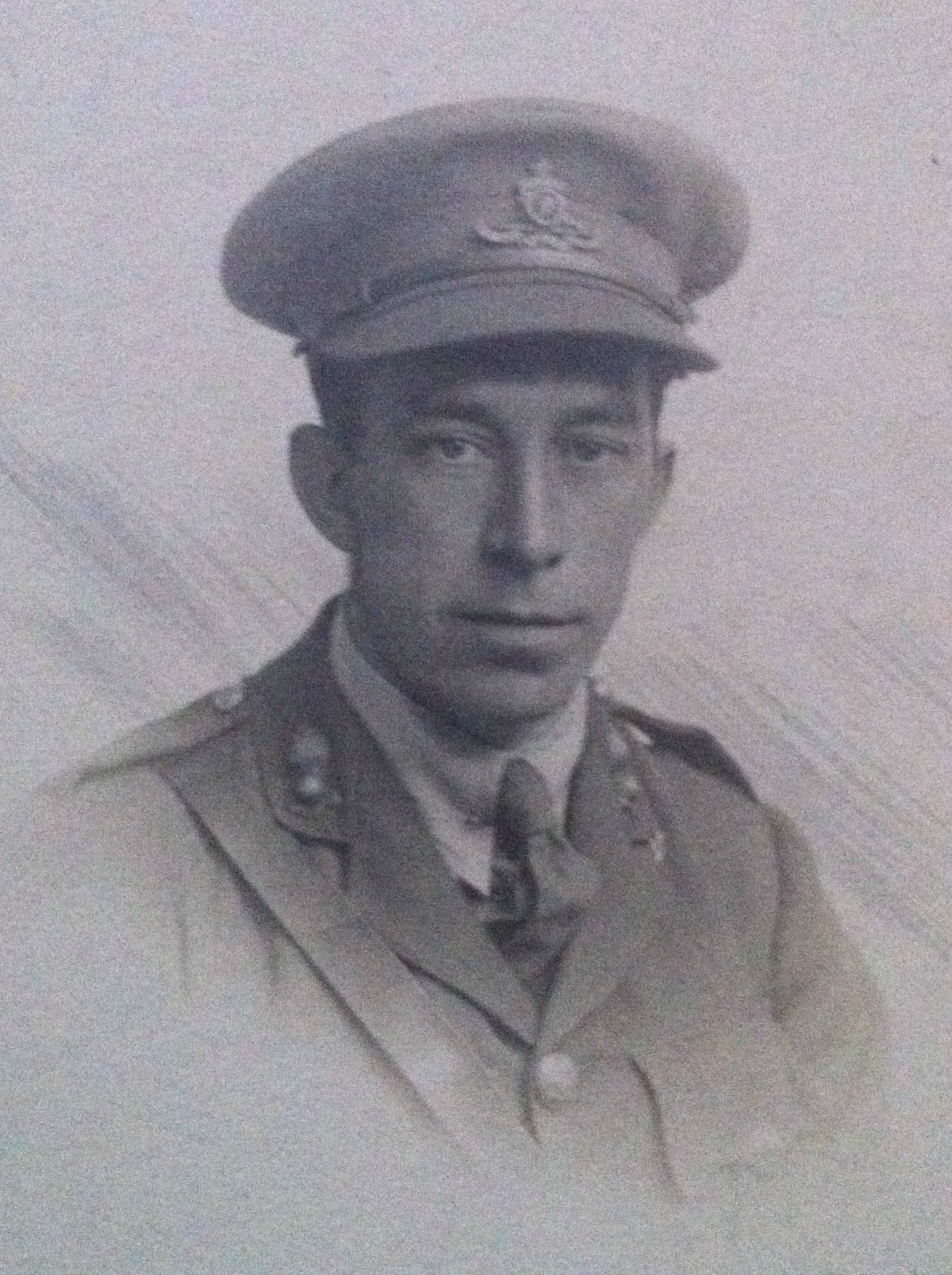
- Born: 1884; Nottingham
- Died: 1972 (aged 87–88)
- Education: Manchester University
- Occupations: Author, typographer, academic librarian

Alfred Forbes Johnson, MC (November 1884 – 27 March 1972) was an English academic librarian, bibliographer, curator, and expert in typography. He was Deputy Keeper of Printed Books at the British Museum. He is author of many bibliographical reference works, and the standard Encyclopaedia of Typefaces.

== Biography ==
Johnson was born in Nottingham in 1884, to John and Ellen Angeline Johnson, née Beilby. He was educated at Nottingham Grammar School and read Classics at the University of Manchester, where he took a first-class degree, played for the university football team, and met his wife, Sarah Elizabeth Jackson. He began working at the British Museum in 1906, joining the Department of Printed Books, which eventually became the British Library, where he was a pioneer in sixteenth-century French and Italian bibliography and printers' type faces.

In World War I he joined the Artists Rifles and was commissioned from there as a lieutenant in the artillery. He saw action in France, where he was awarded the Military Cross for gallantry. After the war he returned to the British Museum, where he became Deputy Keeper of Printed Books while producing many books and monographs on typographical subjects. In 1956 he was awarded the Bibliographical Society's gold medal for distinguished services to bibliography, and he was president of the society from 1956 to 1958.

Johnson made a major contribution towards the dating and attribution of early printed books from their typography which led him to a wider interest in typefaces and design. This culminated in the publication of The Encyclopaedia of Typefaces, produced in collaboration with W Turner Berry and W P Jaspert in 1953. The Encyclopaedia has been through 11 editions and has become "the leading guide to typefaces".

== Bibliography ==
- Il Giorno 1. Il Mattino. Il Mezzogiorno. Giuseppe Parini, 1729–1799, Clarendon Press, Oxford, 1921
- Francisci Petrarchae Epistolae Selectae Edidit A F Johnson, Clarendon Press, Oxford, 1923
- A F Johnson; S Morison, eds. (1924). The Chancery Types of Italy and France. London.
- A F Johnson; H Thomas; A Macfarlane, eds. (1924). Short-Title Catalogue of Books printed in France and of French Books Printed in Other Countries from 1470 to 1600 now in the British Museum. London: British Museum Department of Printed Books.
- The First Century of Printing at Basle, Ernest Benn, London,1926
- A F Johnson; S Halkett; J Laing; D Rhodes; A Simoni; J Kennedy; W Smith, eds. (1926). Dictionary of Anonymous and Pseudonymous English Literature. Vol. 8. London: Oliver & Boyd.
- The Italian Sixteenth Century, Ernest Benn, London, 1926
- French Sixteenth Century Printing, Ernest Benn, London, 1928
- One Hundred Title-Pages, 1500–1800, John Lane, London, 1928
- Astley, C. (1928). A F Johnson; G W Jones (eds.). Catalogue of the Library of Constance Astley at Brinsop Court, Herefordshire. London.
- German Renaissance Title-Borders, Oxford University Press (for the Bibliographical Society), Oxford, 1929
- Decorative Initial Letters. Collected and arranged with an introduction, Cresset Press, London, 1931
- A Catalogue of Engraved and Etched English Title-Pages Down to the Death of William Faithorne, 1691, Oxford University Press (for the Bibliographical Society), Oxford, 1934
- Catalogue of Specimens of Printing Types by English and Scottish Printers and Founders, 1665–1830, with W Berry and S Morison, Oxford University Press, London, 1935
- A Catalogue of Italian Engraved Title-Pages in the Sixteenth Century, Oxford University Press (for Bibliographical Society), Oxford, 1936
- The Italic Types of Robert Granjon, Great Britain, 1941
- A List of Type Specimens, with: Harry Carter, Ellic Howe, Stanley Morison, Graham Pollard, 1942
- Luminario. Or, the Third Chapter of the Liber Elementorum Litterarum on the Construction of Roman Capitals, with S Morison, Verini, London, 1947
- A Catalogue of Italian Writing-Books of the Sixteenth Century [With facsimiles], 1950
- A History of the Old English Letter Foundries, Faber & Faber, London, 1952
- A F Johnson; W Turner Berry; W T Jaspert, eds. (1953). The Encyclopaedia of Type Faces. London: Blandford Press.
- Three Classics of Italian Calligraphy. An unabridged Reissue of the Writing Books of Arrighi, Tagliente and Palatino, Dover Publications, New York, 1953
- Short-title Catalogue of Books Printed in Italy and of Italian Books Printed in Other Countries from 1465 to 1600 now in the British Museum, British Museum Department of Printed Books, London, 1958
- Type Designs: Their History and Development, Grafton, 1959
- Practical Cataloguing, Association of Assistant Librarians, London, 1962
- Short-Title Catalogue of Books Printed in the German-Speaking Countries and German Books Printed in Other Countries from 1455 to 1600 now in the British Museum, British Museum Department of Printed Books, London, 1962
- Short-Title Catalogue of Books Printed in the Netherlands and Belgium and of Dutch and Flemish Books Printed in Other Countries from 1470 to 1600 now in the British Museum, British Museum. Department of Printed Books, London, 1965
- A Programmed Course in Cataloguing and Classification, Deutsch, London, 1968
- A F Johnson; P Muir, eds. (1970). Selected Essays on Books and Printing. Amsterdam: Van Gendt & Co.
