= Stanley Morison =

British typographer (1889–1967)

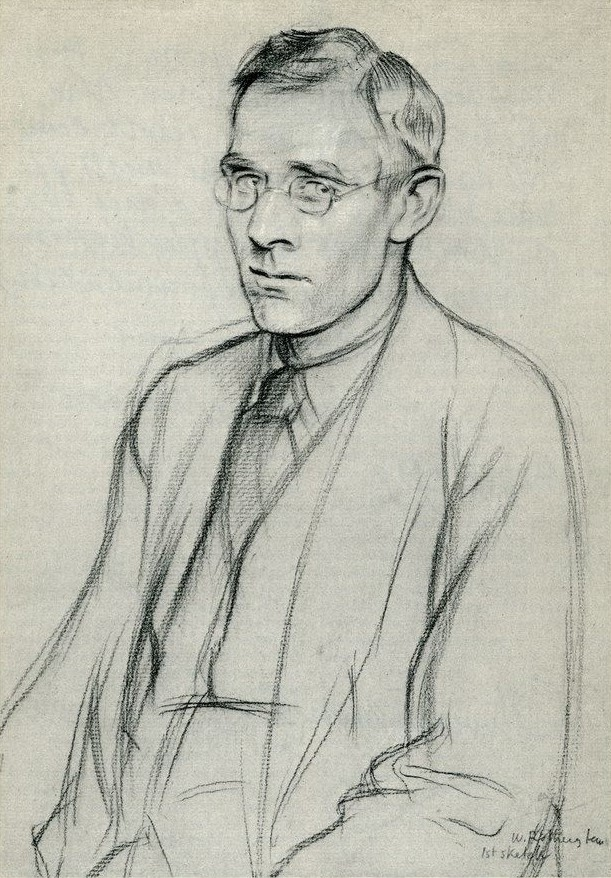
- Morison drawn by Sir William Rothenstein in 1923
- Born: Stanley Arthur Morison; 6 May 1889; Wanstead, Essex, England
- Died: 11 October 1967 (aged 78); London, England
- Occupations: Typographer, printer, historian
- Notable work: Times New Roman

Stanley Arthur Morison (6 May 1889 – 11 October 1967) was a British typographer, printing executive and historian of printing. Largely self-educated, he promoted higher standards in printing and an awareness of the best printing and typefaces of the past.

From the 1920s Morison became an influential adviser to the British Monotype Corporation, advising them on type design. His strong aesthetic sense was a force within the company, which starting shortly before his joining became increasingly known for commissioning popular, historically influenced designs that revived some of the best typefaces of the past, with particular attention to the middle period of printing from the Renaissance to the late eighteenth century, and creating and licensing several new type designs that would become popular. Original typefaces commissioned under Morison's involvement included Times New Roman, Gill Sans and Perpetua, while revivals of older designs included Bembo, Ehrhardt and Bell. Times New Roman, the development of which Morison led to the point that he felt he could consider it his own design, has become one of the most used typefaces of all time. Becoming closely connected to The Times newspaper as an advisor on printing, he became part of its management and the editor of the Times Literary Supplement after the war, and late in life joined the editorial board of Encyclopædia Britannica.

== Early life and career ==
Stanley Arthur Morison was born on 6 May 1889, at Wanstead, Essex, but spent most of his childhood and early adult years (1896–1912) in London at the family home in Fairfax Road, Harringay. He was self-taught, having left school after his father abandoned his family.

In 1913 Morison became an editorial assistant on The Imprint magazine.

Morison was one of the founders of The Guild of the Pope's Peace, an organization created to promote Pope Benedict XV's calls for peace in the face of the First World War.

On the imposition of conscription in 1916 during First World War, he was a conscientious objector, and was imprisoned. (Note: Some in the printing industry continued to find Morison's decision to avoid serving disreputable for many years. The printer Christopher Sandford wrote to the wood-engraver John O'Connor, then serving in the RAF, in 1946, "do wear uniform at the Double Crown Club dinner [in memory of Eric Ravilious, who had died during the war]—I like to show that my collaborators have been serving their country. Francis Meynell and Stanley Morison were conscientious objectors in the 1914–18 war when of military age and I shall never forgive them that.") Like his friend Eric Gill, Morison was a convert to Catholicism, distancing him from many of his later colleagues. Morison married Mabel Williamson, a teacher, in 1916; they had an unhappy marriage and Morison quickly separated from his wife.

In 1918, he became design supervisor at the Pelican Press, which published material critical of the war. He moved on to a similar position at the Cloister Press. In 1922, he was a founder-member of the Fleuron Society dedicated to typographic matters (a fleuron being a typographic flower or ornament). He edited the society's journal, The Fleuron, from 1925 to 1930. The quality of the publication's artwork and printing was considered exceptional. From 1923 to 1925, he was also a staff editor/writer for the Penrose Annual, a graphic arts journal.

== With the Monotype Corporation ==
From 1923 to 1967, Morison was a typographic consultant for the Monotype Corporation. In the 1920s and 1930s, his work at Monotype included research and adaptation of historical typefaces, including the revival of the Bembo and Bell types. He pioneered the great expansion of the company's range of typefaces, and hugely influenced the field of typography to the present day. At Monotype, Morison obtained rights to typefaces by leading artists of the time including Bruce Rogers, Jan van Krimpen and Berthold Wolpe. Aesthetically, Morison disliked the excessive historicity of Victorian romantic fine printing, with its interest in reviving blackletter and the appearance of medieval manuscripts, but preferred a more restrained style of printing that nonetheless also rejected the harshly industrial appearance of the "batteries of bold, bad faces" of the nineteenth century.

In 1927, the British Monotype Corporation hired Beatrice Warde – quickly named the company's Publicity Manager – and has been credited with spreading Morison's typographic influences through her own writings. Morison and Warde helped edit Monotype's newsletter, the Monotype Recorder, which promoted Monotype equipment and provided tips for users, showcased examples of high-quality printing and included articles on printing history, several by Morison's collaborator Alfred F. Johnson, a curator at the British Museum. Through Daniel Berkeley Updike, the leading figure in American printing of the time with whom he carried an extensive correspondence, he became aware of an obscure late-eighteenth century type known as Bell in the archives of Sheffield type foundry Stephenson Blake, and arranged for Monotype to license and recreate it. While not all his projects at Monotype were successful and his position was insecure at the start of his tenure, his commission of Gill Sans and even more so Times New Roman both proved extremely financially successful for Monotype. Both remain among the most-used typefaces of all time.

Morison became friends with Brooke Crutchley, printer to the University of Cambridge, one of Monotype's best customers, and his archives went to Cambridge after his death. Late in life, for Crutchley he wrote the book A Tally of Types, an assessment of the typefaces created by Monotype that were used in Cambridge. Despite its limited scope and some oversights, it is considered one of the landmark books on twentieth-century printing.

As a writer for the Fleuron he was known for promoting the radical idea that italics in book printing were too disruptive to the flow of text, and should be phased out. While this influenced some contemporary type designers such as van Krimpen and Dwiggins at Linotype, Morison rapidly came to concede that the idea was misguided, and late in life commented that Times New Roman included an italic that "owed more to Didot than dogma."

Morison wrote prolifically on the history of printing. Philip Gaskell however cautioned that "his books and papers were always stimulating, and frequently sound in their general conclusions, but at the same time he was inaccurate".

== Times New Roman ==
Morison was also typographical consultant to The Times newspaper from 1929 to 1960; and in 1931, having criticised the paper for the poor quality of its printing, he was commissioned by the newspaper to produce a new, easy-to-read typeface for the publication. Times New Roman, the typeface which Morison developed with graphic artist Victor Lardent, was first used by the newspaper in 1932 and was issued commercially by Monotype in 1933.

He held the Sandars Readership in Bibliography at Cambridge in 1931 and lectured on "The English newspaper: some account of the physical development of the journals printed in London from 1622 down to the present day."

Morison edited the History of the Times from 1935 to 1952, and was editor of The Times Literary Supplement between 1945 and 1948.

== Later career ==
Morison was Lyell Lecturer in Bibliography at the University of Oxford in 1956-1957 and lectured on "Aspects of Authority and Freedom in Relation to Greco–Latin Script, Inscription, and Type."

In 1960, Morison was elected a Royal Designer for Industry. He was a member of the editorial board of Encyclopædia Britannica from 1961 until his death in 1967.

He was instrumental in development of the exhibition of the contribution printing had made to the enlargement of human knowledge: Printing and the Mind of Man. It coincided with the 1963 International Printing Machinery and Allied Trades Exhibition (IPEX).

Morison died in London on 11 October 1967.

== Selected publications ==
- On Type Faces, Examples of the use of type for the printing of books: with an introductory essay & notes by Stanley Morison, The Medici Society of Seven, Grafton St, London, & The Fleuron, Westminster, 1923
- Four centuries of Fine Printing; Two Hundred and Seventy-two Examples of the Work of Presses Established Between 1465 and 1924, 1924
- Type Designs of the Past and Present, 1926
- English newspaper: Some account of the physical development of journals printed in London between 1622 & the present day, 1932
- First Principles of Typography, 1936
- A List of Type Specimens, with: Harry Carter, Ellic Howe, Alfred F. Johnson and Graham Pollard, 1942
- English Prayer Books, 1943; revised edition 1945; revised and enlarged edition 1949; digital reprint 2009
- A Tally of Types, 1953
- Calligraphy 1535–1885: A collection of seventy-two writing-books and specimens from the Italian, French, Low Countries and Spanish schools, 1962
- On Type Designs Past and Present: A Brief Introduction, 1962
- The Typographic Book, 1450–1935: A Study of Fine Typography Through Five Centuries, 1963
- Letter Forms, typographic and scriptorial: Two essays on their classification, history and bibliography, 1968
- Politics and Script, 1972
- Selected Essays on the History of Letter-Forms in Manuscript and Print, Vol. 1 & 2, 1980.

== See also ==
- List of AIGA medalists

== Notes and references ==
=== Notes ===
Explanatory footnotes

Citation footnotes

=== General references ===
- James Moran, Stanley Morison: His Typographic Achievement
- Nicolas Barker, Stanley Morison (authorised biography) (Note: Barker had to write the biography rapidly, resulting in a release with numerous misprints and errors, listed in an errata section of the Times Literary Supplement shortly afterwards.)
