= Shelley's Vegetarianism =

1891 pamphlet by William Axon

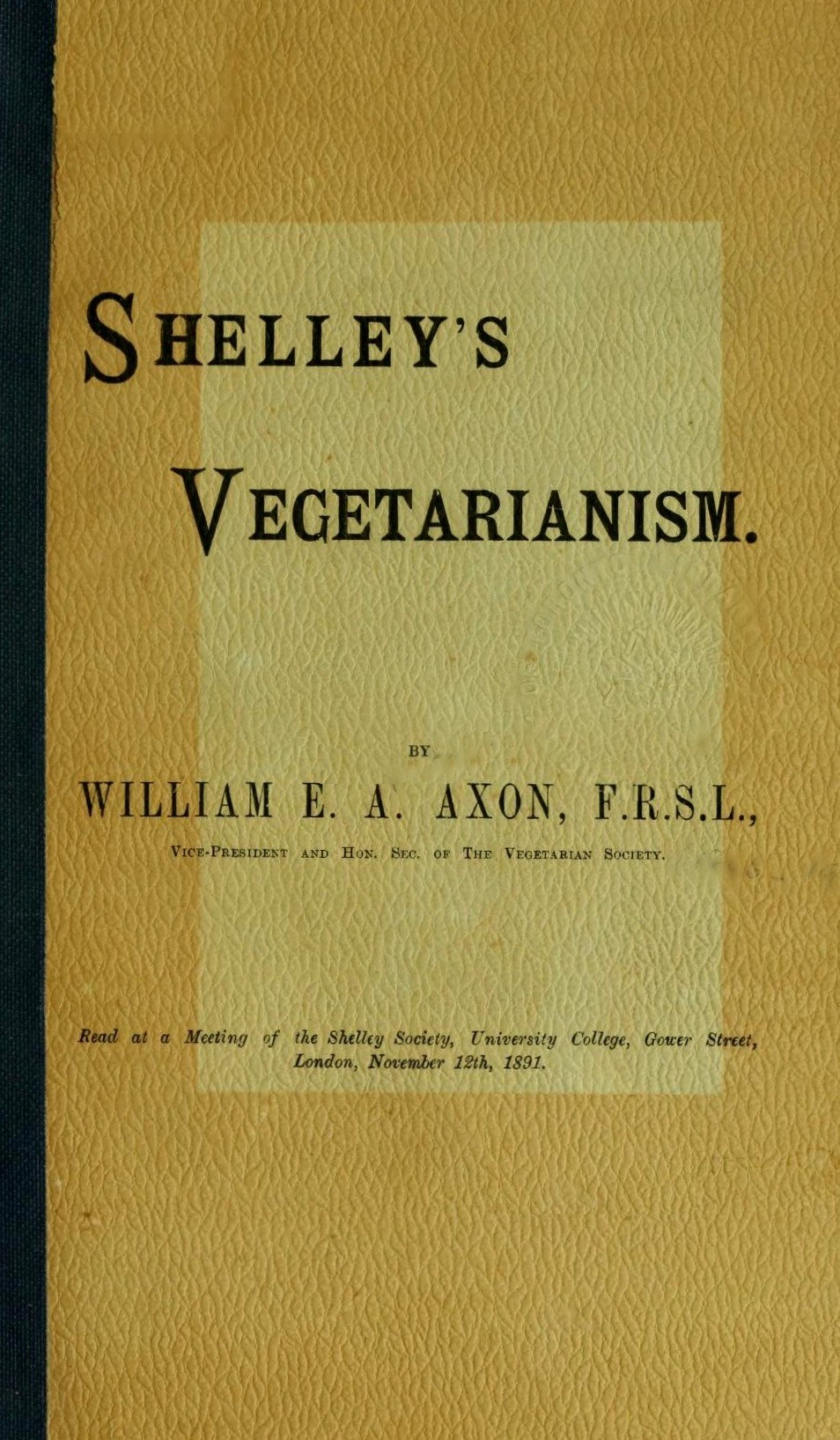
- Front cover
- Author: William Axon
- Language: English
- Genre: Vegetarianism
- Publisher: Vegetarian Society
- Publication date: 1891
- Publication place: England
- Media type: Print (pamphlet)
- Pages: 13 pp
- ISBN: 0838310311
- OCLC: 557574532
- LC Class: PR5431 .A98 1971
- Text: Shelley's Vegetarianism at Wikisource

Shelley's Vegetarianism is an 1891 pamphlet on the vegetarianism of Percy Bysshe Shelley by William Axon, published by the Vegetarian Society. It is a printing of a lecture delivered by Axon before the Shelley Society, at University College, London, in 1890.

== Background ==
The main entrance of University College, circa 1900

Percy Bysshe Shelley was an English Romantic poet who wrote several essays on the subject of vegetarianism and animal rights, including the 1813 book, A Vindication of Natural Diet. Himself an avid vegetarian, Englishman William Edward Armytage Axon was employed as a librarian, with a professional hobby for antiquary, writing, and bibliography. He has also been called a "leading figure of the vegetarian movement." Axon was the Honorable Secretary and the Vice President of the Vegetarian Society, and a member of the Shelley Society, at the time of the publication of the pamphlet, and co-wrote the preface for the 1884 edition of A Vindication of Natural Diet.

In 1887, Axon published an article on Shelley's vegetarian aspects of living, for the fifth issue of Almonds and Raisins, along with an essay on vegetarianism in Buddhism, and several short poems. In this article, it is noted that Shelley's diet was "in keeping with his whole character, and essential to his imaginative style of writing." On May 15 and June 20, 1890, he sent two advance letters to writer and ethical vegetarian reformer Henry S. Salt, who was also in the Vegetarian Society, as reported in The British Library Catalogues, concerning the planned lecture on the topic of Shelley's vegetarianism. An advertisement for this lecture appears in the November 9 issue of the secular humanist journal The Freethinker.

=== The Meeting at University College ===
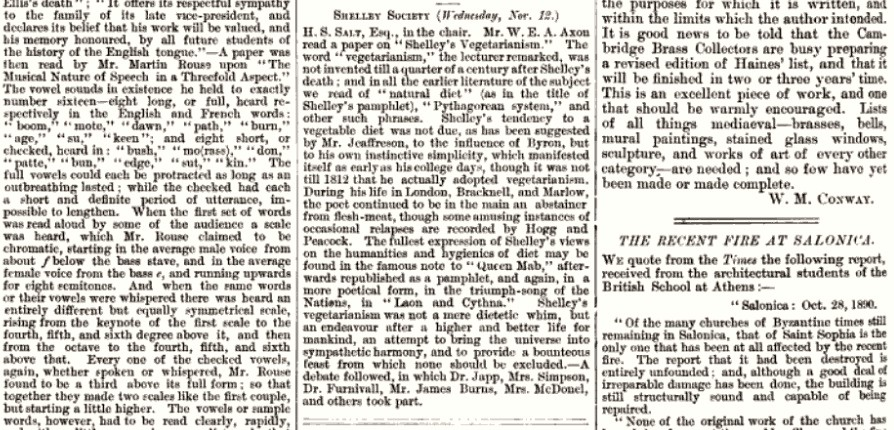
Lecture notes by Henry S. Salt, center column, in No. 968 of The Academy

Axon read "Shelley's Vegetarianism" before the members of the Shelley Society, at University College, on Gower Street in London, at 8 P.M., Wednesday November 12, 1890. The meeting was promoted as being open to visitors, and discussion, following the lecture was invited for all who attended.

On the chair at the meeting was Henry S. Salt. Also attending the meeting was Scottish author and publisher Alexander Hay Japp, English philologist Frederick James Furnivall, along with Jane Ann Heavisides Simpson, James Burns, and Mrs. McDonel, who each took part in the discussion after the lecture, as well as several other unnamed people. Remarks from Salt regarding the lecture, where that during his life in London, Bracknell, and Marlow, the poet Shelley continued to be in the main an abstainer from flesh-meat, his views on the humanities, and the hygienics of diet, which were printed in the November 22, 1890 edition of The Academy. He concludes his notes from the lecture by reiterating Axon, in that Shelley's diet "was not a mere dietetic whim, but an endeavour after a higher and better life for mankind, an attempt to bring the universe into sympathetic harmony, and to provide a bounteous feast from which none should be excluded."

It was subsequently published in pamphlet form the following year. Axon continued to give addresses on these topics for the next two decades, such as one which is entitled "Some Famous Vegetarians," which began with the ancient Indian sage Asoka and ended with Shelley, contending that their diet "was no hindrance to their greatness." He also published these topics in several of his future works, including the 1897 book, Bygone Sussex.

== Publication ==
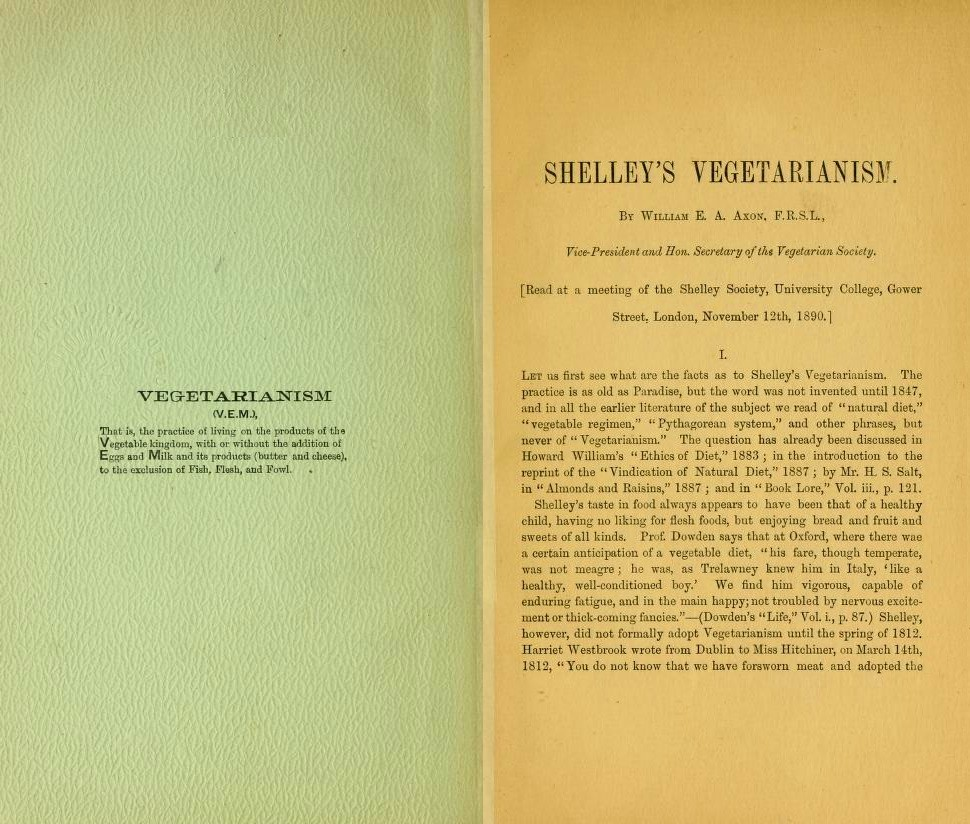
Opening page to Shelley's Vegetarianism

The 15 x 22 centimeter sewed pamphlet was covered in paper wrapping, and was published and circulated the year following Axon's lecture to the Shelley Society, by the Vegetarian Society, at 75 Princess Street, Manchester. It is 13 pages in total length, excluding advertisements and notes by the Vegetarian Society. An edition was published by bibliophile and forger Thomas J. Wise in the same year. By 1908, the cost of one copy of Shelley's Vegetarianism was 2 shillings.

Within a few decades, Shelley's Vegetarianism had been entered into several libraries, including in England, the Worcester Public Library, the Public Library of Boston, and the Harvard Library in the United States, as well as several in Germany, and others throughout Europe. It also appeared in several private libraries including bibliographer and bookseller Harry Buxton Forman, who owned two copies, and Polish typographer Samuel Tyszkiewicz.

By 1922, the pamphlet was being sold for 50 cents per issue.

A copy, signed by English writer, critic, and fellow Shelley Society member William Michael Rossetti, was for sale in 1939 at the former printing house and antiquarian bookshop in London, Sotheran's, for 15 shillings.

At the following meeting, Rossetti read an essay on "The Shelleys Near Geneva; Dr. Polidori's Diary." A notable facsimile reprint was made by Haskell House, in 1971, which was 16 pages in total length, in a demy octavo collation, and selling for nearly six dollars two years after this publication. Between 1890 and 2010, approximately 20 editions of this pamphlet have been published, with it being held at 147 libraries worldwide.

Shelley's Vegetarianism is described as containing a "compendium of citations" from Shelley's prose and poems. It is cited in many publications, such as the work Anglia: Zeitschrift für englische Philologie, which uses the pamphlet to reflect on Shelley's sometimes wavering adherence to the natural diet throughout the later years of his life, as well as referencing the inscription on his grave, which was a line from William Shakespeare's play The Tempest.

=== Content ===
On the inside of the cover is the Vegetarian Society's definition of vegetarianism, which reads "the practice of living on the products of the Vegetable kingdom, with or without the addition of Eggs and Milk and its products (butter and cheese), to the exclusion of Fish, Flesh, and Fowl." Adjacent to this page is the opening to Shelley's Vegetarianism, which looks at the origin of the word "vegetarian", which did not exist until a quarter of a century after Shelley's death, before being referred to as a "natural diet," "vegetable regimen," or the "Pythagorean system."

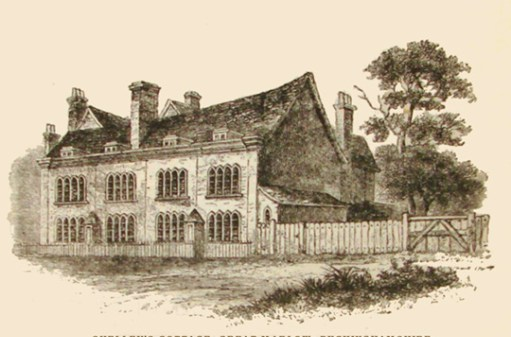
Illustration of Thomas Love Peacock's cottage, where the Shelleys stayed

It then divulges into the early years of his life, and his dietetic influences from English poet and politician Lord Byron and the Vegetarians "with whom he lived intimately at London and Bracknell," which formed his "instinctive" dietetic simplicity. Much of the pamphlet focuses on the time that the Shelleys spent in the village of Marlow, Buckinghamshire, along with their close friend, novelist Thomas Love Peacock, whose home they shared. During this period, Shelley practiced occasional regimens of starvation. It also recounts his hygiene, and his fondness for physical exercise, and even strenuous exertion. Axon cites Irish critic and poet Edward Dowden's Life, noting that "it was, indeed, a point of honour with Shelley to prove that some grit lay under his outward appearance of weakness and excitable nerves; for he was an apostle of the Vegetarian faith, and a water drinker, and must not discredit the doctrine which he preached and practised."

Axon also gives an account of Shelley's belief that with vegetarianism comes a wholesome society. It also notes some of his instances of relapses, as recorded by Hogg and Peacock, along with a letter from his son, Sir Percy Florence Shelley, which also recounts: "I think I remember my mother telling me that he gave it up to a great extent in his later years—not from want of faith, but from the inconvenience."

The pamphlet also contains excerpts from several of Shelley's poems, including "Letter to Maria Gisborne," "Alastor," "Sensitive Plant," and "Laon and Cyntha," which would come to be known as "The Revolt of Islam." It also contains portions of the poems "The Eve of St. Agnes" by English Romantic poet John Keats, and "The City of our Dreams" by Felix Adler. Two pages of works published by the Vegetarian Society appear at the end of the work, listed by series. At the end of the Shelley's Vegetarianism is a page of the members of the Society, along with its aims, subscription directions, and an advertisement for the Vegetarian Messenger located on the opposite page.

== Reviews ==
Romanticism and the Materiality of Nature describes it as "another late-nineteenth century encomium of Shelley's vegetarianism." Romantic literature and culture site Romantic Circles notes that Shelley's Vegetarianism contains "very little discussion," adding that it is "enlightening for those who did not know about this aspect of Shelley, but adding very little to the historical understanding of a familiar reader." It concludes with writing "it is the kind of book that can be replaced by studies which examine the same passages in far more detail: readers of Morton's recent book are well beyond needing Axon."

== See also ==
- Vegetarianism in the Romantic era
