= A Tally of Types =

- Title page of the first edition
- Author: Stanley Morison
- Subject: Typography
- Published: 1953
- Publication place: England
- ISBN: 9780521097864 (1973 reprint)

A Tally of Types is a book on typography authored by the type designer Stanley Morison. It was first published in 1953, and showcases significant typeface designs produced during Morison's tenure at the Lanston Monotype Corporation for their hot-metal typesetting machines during the 1920s and 1930s in England.

According to Brooke Crutchley, University Printer at the Cambridge University Press, the book "first appeared in 1953, when it was issued as a Christmas keepsake to 'friends of the University Printer in printing and publishing'"; only 450 copies were printed and distributed of this original edition.

The author, a scholarly British pioneer historian and typographer, was the driving force behind Monotype's dynamic typographic programme of research and revival of representative historical typographic models. The book was compiled and written at Crutchley's request.

A Tally of Types, now republished many times, has proven to be an important source of information on typography. In the 1973 edition, three appendices were added, describing typeface designs developed since the original printing. A recent edition includes an introduction by digital-typography pioneer Mike Parker. A Tally of Types holds a critical account, in Morison's erudite style, of the typeface designs cut under his watchful eye during typography's most influential typeface revival project, turning his detailed insight into the inner workings of early 20th century type design into an enduring record of the practice of typography.

== Typeface designs discussed ==
- Bruce Rogers' Centaur Roman
- Alfred Fairbank's Arrighi Italic, also called Bembo Condensed Italic
- Bembo Italic, based on the work of Francesco Griffo for Aldus Manutius around 1495
- Poliphilus Roman, based on the work of Francesco Griffo for Aldus Manutius around 1495
- Blado Italic, based on the work of Ludovico Vicentino degli Arrighi
- Garamond Roman, thought to be based on the work of Claude Garamond but now known to be the work of Jean Jannon
- Granjon Italic, based on the work of Jean Jannon (as above)
- Fournier roman and italic, based on the work of Pierre-Simon Fournier
- Barbou Roman, based on the work of Pierre-Simon Fournier
- Baskerville Roman and Italic, cut for John Baskerville by John Handy
- Bell Roman and Italic, cut by Richard Austin for John Bell
- Goudy Modern Roman and Italic, by Frederic Goudy
- Perpetua Roman, by Eric Gill
- Felicity Italic, by Eric Gill
- Stanley Morison and Victor Lardent's Times New Roman

=== Appendices added in the 1973 edition ===
- Jan van Krimpen's Van Dijk, written by Netty Hoeflake
- Ehrhardt, based on the work of Miklós Tótfalusi Kis, by Harry Carter
- Jan van Krimpen's Romulus, written by John Dreyfus
