= The Necessity of Atheism =

1811 essay on atheism by Percy Bysshe Shelley

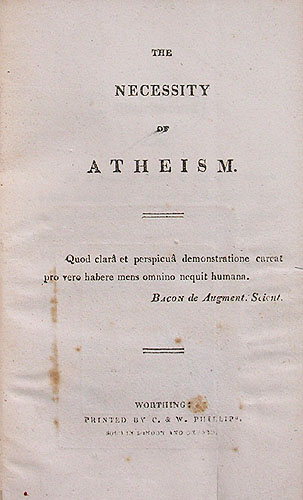
1811 title page. Worthing: C. and W. Phillips.

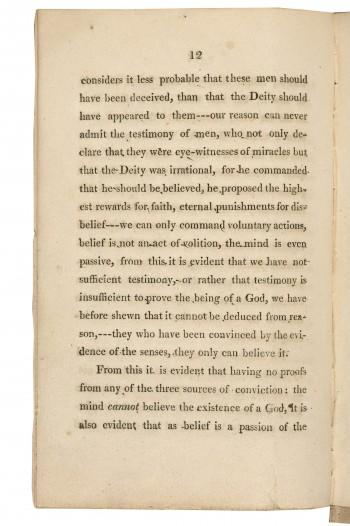
A page from the 1811 Worthing printing. Bodleian Library.

A page from the 1811 Worthing printing. Bodleian Library.

"The Necessity of Atheism" is an essay on atheism by the English Romantic poet Percy Bysshe Shelley, printed in 1811 by Charles and William Phillips in Worthing while Shelley was a student at University College, Oxford.

A signed copy was sent to all the heads of Oxford colleges at the University. At that time most lecturers at Oxford were ordained by the Church of England (not till later in the century would this change) and were acquainted with the concept of blasphemy. While England did not consider atheism itself to be illegal at the time, promotion of the idea of atheism was.

The content provided ample grounds for authorities to effect his being rusticated for contumacy along with his refusing to deny authorship, together with his friend and fellow student, Thomas Jefferson Hogg. A revised and expanded version of the text was included as one of the notes to Shelley's poem Queen Mab in 1813, and some reprints with the title The Necessity of Atheism are based on this rather than the 1811 pamphlet.

== Synopsis ==
The tract starts with the following rationale of the author's goals:

As a love of truth is the only motive which actuates the Author of this little tract, he earnestly entreats that those of his readers who may discover any deficiency in his reasoning, or may be in possession of proofs which his mind could never obtain, would offer them, together with their objections to the Public, as briefly, as methodically, as plainly as he has taken the liberty of doing.

— Percy Bysshe Shelley, The Necessity of Atheism

Shelley made a number of claims in Necessity, including that one's beliefs are involuntary, and, therefore, that atheists do not choose to be so and should not be persecuted. Towards the end of the pamphlet he writes: "the mind cannot believe in the existence of a God." Shelley signed the pamphlet, Thro' deficiency of proof, AN ATHEIST, which gives an idea of the empiricist nature of Shelley's beliefs. According to Berman, Shelley also believed himself to have "refuted all the possible types of arguments for God's existence," but Shelley himself encouraged readers to offer proofs if they possess them.

Opinion is divided upon the characterisation of Shelley's beliefs, at the time of the writing of Necessity. At the very beginning of his note on the line "There is no God" in Canto VII of Queen Mab, published just two years later and based on Necessity, Shelley qualifies his definition of atheism:

There Is No God. This negation must be understood solely to affect a creative Deity. The hypothesis of a pervading Spirit co-eternal with the universe remains unshaken.

— Percy Bysshe Shelley, Queen Mab, Canto VII, Note 13

For Shelley, a knowledge or understanding of nature, through science, would lead to the belief in gods being superseded: "If ignorance of nature gave birth to gods, knowledge of nature is made for their destruction."

Shelley also quotes the Dutch pantheist Baruch Spinoza later in the Note, but there is no explicit statement of pantheistic views.

Shelley scholar Carlos Baker states that "the title of his college pamphlet should have been The Necessity of Agnosticism rather than The Necessity of Atheism," while historian David Berman argues that Shelley was an atheist, both because he characterised himself as such, and because "he denies the existence of God in both published works and private letters" during the same period.

== Authorship ==
Although The Necessity of Atheism is often attributed solely to Shelley, historian of atheism David Berman says that Shelley "was probably assisted by his friend T.J. Hogg".

== Format ==
The original pamphlet was described by Percy Vaughan as "a single foolscap sheet folded in octavo, consisting of half-title (with blank reverse), title page... (with blank reverse), Advertisement (with blank reverse), and text occupying pages 7–13. At the foot of page 13 is the imprint, "Phillips, Printers, Worthing," and the reverse of the page is blank. A blank leaf completes the sheet."

== Publication history ==
The pamphlet was first published on 13 or 14 February 1811. Very few copies of the original 16-page 1811 pamphlet survive, as most were destroyed after publication. Only six are known to exist in libraries today (Nicolas Walter knew of five in 1998; a sixth was discovered at Edinburgh University in 2015):

- Bodleian Library, Oxford University (bound with three other pamphlets by Shelley). This (imperfect, lacking the half-title page) copy had been Shelley's gift to bookseller Thomas Hookham, but eventually found its way via Leigh Hunt to Shelley's son Sir Percy Shelley, whose wife Lady Jane Shelley gave it to the Bodleian.
- British Library, London (part of the restricted-access Ashley Library Printed books, microfilm available. This copy was retained by the Oxford booksellers Munday & Slatter (later Slatter & Rose). John Rose kept it until his death in 1897, when it was purchased by Thomas J Wise, whose Ashley Library ended up in the British Library)
- St. John's College, University of Cambridge
- Edinburgh University Library
- Robert H. Taylor Collection, Princeton University Library, New Jersey, United States (a copy apparently retained by the family of John Rose, the original printer of the pamphlet)
- Miriam Lutcher Stark Library, Harry Ransom Center, University of Texas (bought for $9,300 in 1939, a decision investigated by the Texas House of Representatives in 1943).

=== Reprints ===
The first reprint of the 1811 pamphlet appeared in a collection of Shelley's work and used the copy now in the Bodleian Library:

- 1880. The Necessity of Atheism, in The Prose Works. Volume I. Edited by Harry Buxton Forman. London: Reeves and Turner. pp. 299–309. The first reprint. Annotated. The editor states that he obtained his copy from Sir Percy and Lady Shelley. Online.

The second reprint used the copy now in the British Library:

- 1906. The Necessity of Atheism. Edited by Thomas J. Wise and Percy Vaughan. "Issued for the Rationalist Press Association Limited by arrangement with the Shelley Society." London: Watts & Co. pp. 13. A typographical imitation, with an introduction by Wise and Vaughan. The first separately published reprint.

Subsequent reprints include:

- 1950. The Necessity of Atheism, in Shelley, Trelawny, and Henley: a study of three Titans. Edited by Samuel J. Looker. "A facsimile of the original edition printed at Worthing." 13pp.
- 1952. The Necessity of Atheism, and Declaration of Rights. Charlottesville, Virginia: The Patrick Henry Literary Society. 8pp. Limited edition of 500 copies.
- 1965. The Necessity of Atheism, by an Atheist, in Shelley & Zastrozzi: self-revelation of a neurotic, by Dr. Eustace Chesser. London: Gregg/Archive.
- 1968. The Necessity of Atheism, together with excerpts of revolutionary verse. Edited by David Tribe. National Secular Society/Oxford University Humanist Group. 9pp.
- 1972. The Necessity of Atheism, in Selected Essays on Atheism. New York: Arno Press/New York Times.
- 1976. The Necessity of Atheism. Introductory note by Mahadevaprasad Saha. First Indian Edition. Calcutta.
- 1992. The Necessity of Atheism. Oxford: Bodleian Library. 13pp. Reprinted from the Bodleian Library's copy, presented in a wallet.
- 1993. The Necessity of Atheism, in The Necessity of Atheism And Other Essays. Freethought Library. Buffalo, New York: Prometheus Books.
- 1998. The Necessity of Atheism. Edited and annotated by Nicolas Walter. Freethinker's Classics #2. London: G.W. Foote & Co. Ltd. Includes a reprint of the introduction to the 1906 Watts & Co. edition. Based on the British Library copy.

== Bibliography ==
- Abbey, Lloyd. Destroyer and Preserver: Shelley's Poetic Skepticism. Lincoln: U of Nebraska P, 1979.
- Albery, John, et al., Shelley and Univ. 1810–1811, University College, Oxford, 20 June 1992. (Papers delivered by the Master and three Fellows of University College at a seminar to commemorate the bicentenary of Shelley's birth.)
- Barnard, Ellsworth. Shelley's Religion. New York: Russell & Russell, 1964.
- Berman, David. A History of Atheism in Britain. London: Routledge, 1988.
- Brazell, James. Shelley and the Concept of Humanity: A Study of His Moral Vision. Salzburg: Inst. fur Englische Sprache und Literatur, Univ. Salzburg, 1972.
- Cooper, Andrew M. Doubt and Identity in Romantic Poetry. New Haven: Yale UP, 1988.
- Dumain, Ralph. "The Autodidact Project: Percy Bysshe Shelley". 2007. Online link: http://www.autodidactproject.org/other/shelley-athe6.html
- Dumain, Ralph. "It must be Shelley." Reason & Society, 26 June 2007.
- Evans, F. B. "Shelley, Godwin, Hume, and the Doctrine of Necessity." Studies in Philology, (1940), 37: 632‑640.
- Fuller, David. "Shelley and Jesus." Durham University Journal, 85.54 (2) (1993): 211–223.
- Gingerich, S. F. "Shelley's Doctrine of Necessity versus Christianity". PMLA, Vol. 33, No. 3 (1918), pp. 444–473.
- Griffiths, Robert. "Shelley and the Old and New Atheism." PN Review 38.2 (2011): 25.
- Hiroshi, Harata. "Shelley and The Necessity of Atheism: His True Voice and its Background." Bulletin of Holly Spirit Junior College, 15, 28–39, 1987-03-30.
- Hoffmann, R. Joseph. "The Necessity of Atheism, The Indispensability of Doubt." The New Oxonian, 27 August 2010.
- Hogle, Jerrold E. Shelley's process: radical transference and the development of his major works. Oxford University Press, 1988.
- Jager, Colin. "Shelley After Atheism". Studies in Romanticism, Vol. 49, No. 4, Winter 2010. pp. 611–631. Online link: https://www.jstor.org/stable/23056023
- Jones, Frederick L. "Hogg and the Necessity of Atheism." PMLA, Vol. 52, No. 2 (Jun. 1937), pp. 423–426.
- Joukovsky, Nicholas A. "Robert Parker's 'Letters on Atheism': An Early Response to Shelley's The Necessity of Atheism." Review of English Studies, Vol. 63, iss. 261, September 2012. pp. 608–633.
- O’Neill, Michael. "1810–1816: 'Breathing Hatred to Government & Religion'." Percy Bysshe Shelley: A Literary Life. London: Palgrave Macmillan UK, 1989. 10-35.
- Orel, Harold. "Another Look at The Necessity of Atheism." Mosaic 2.2 (1969): 27.
- Peterfreund, Stuart. "An Early Response to Shelley's 'The Necessity of Atheism'." Keats-Shelley Journal, Vol. 36, (1987), pp. 26–31.
- Pulos, C.E. The Deep Truth: A Study of Shelley's Skepticism. Lincoln, NE: U of Nebraska P, 1954.
- Reiman, Donald H. Intervals of Inspiration: The Skeptical Tradition and the Psychology of Romanticism. Greenwood, FL: Penkevill, 1988.
- Shelley, Brian. Shelley and Scripture: The Interpreting Angel. Oxford: Oxford UP, 1994.
- Shelley, Percy Bysshe, The Necessity of Atheism and Other Essays. Prometheus Books (The Freethought Library), 1993. ISBN 0-87975-774-4.
- Shelley, Percy Bysshe, The Necessity of Atheism. Edited and annotated by Nicolas Walter. London, G.W. Foote & Co. Ltd (Freethinker's Classics #2), 1998, 2016. ISBN 978-0-9508243-8-3.
- Sloan, Gary. "Shelley: Angelic Atheist." Liberator, 13 October 2003.
- Vaughan, Percy. Early Shelley Pamphlets. London: Watts & Co, 1905. Online.
- White, Newman Ivey. "Poet of Revolution." Book Review: Shelley. Time, 16 December 1940.
- Winkler, Piper, and Susan J. Wolfson. "Covering The Necessity of Atheism." Essays In Criticism 74.3 (2024): 310-351.
- Wroe, Ann. "The Necessity of Atheism: two hundred years young." The Keats-Shelley Review, Vol. 26, issue 1, 2012. pp. 42–54.
