= Liberality and Prodigality =

- Written by: Unknown
- Genre: Morality play, Comedy

Premiere
- Date premiered: c.1567

Liberality and Prodigality (A Pleasant Comedie, shewing the contention betweene Liberalitie and Prodigalitie, also known as Contention between Liberality and Prodigality) is a morality play by an unknown author from c.1567. Its title page also reads: "As it was played before her Maiestie. London Printed by Simon Stafford for George Vincent, and are to be sold at the signs of the Hand in hand in Wood-street over against S. Michaels Church."

The play is a farcical allegorization of the relationship between the ethical concepts of Liberality and Prodigality, the qualities of which are derived from Aristotle's Nicomachean Ethics. It is notable for being one of the earliest attempts to present an Aristotelian dramatization of these qualities in early modern drama.

The copy of this play in the Garrick Collection appears to be the only one known. There is some internal evidence, from the allusion to the 43rd year of Queen Elizabeth, that the production was performed before the Queen in 1600; and it seems likely that it was a revival of a more ancient piece. Edward Phillips, author of the Theatrum Poetarum, assigned it to Robert Greene, but this attribution is dubious.

== Sources ==
- Craik, Thomas Wallace. 1958. The Tudor Interlude: Stage, Costume and Acting. Leicester: Leicester UP.
- Horbury, Ezra. 2019. Prodigality in Early Modern Drama, Woodbridge: Boydell and Brewer ISBN 978 1 78744 606 9
- Southern, Richard. 1973. The Staging of Plays Before Shakespeare. London: Faber. ISBN 0-571-10132-1.
