= Garrick Collection =

The British Library's Garrick Collection is a collection of early printed editions of English drama amassed by the actor and playwright David Garrick. The collection was bequeathed to the British Museum in 1779.

== Collection overview ==
Little evidence about the provenance of Garrick's collection is found in his archives and correspondence. However, internal evidence from the books themselves suggests that a large proportion of the printed plays came from the collections of Robert and Edward Harley, the 1st and 2nd Earls of Oxford, and the bookseller and writer, Robert Dodsley. Other notable previous owners of items in the Garrick Collection include Humfrey Dyson, Richard Smith (d. 1675), Lewis Theobald, Narcissus Luttrell, Richard Warner, Thomas Astle, and William Cartwright. The latter bequeathed his library to Dulwich College Library and there is some speculation that "Garrick had free access to the library of Dulwich College ... and pillaged without scruple or remorse".

The collection, in its original state, comprised approximately 1300 individual items. However, on its arrival at the Museum it was found that the collection was incomplete, some volumes having been retained by Garrick's family. In addition to this, since becoming the property of the British Museum, some items have been sold in duplicate sales. In total more than 70 items that were originally owned by Garrick are not in his collection as it now exists in the British Library. A manuscript catalogue compiled by Edward Capell, one of Garrick's closest friends, does still survive. Entitled A catalogue of plays; the collection of David Garrick Esq, its creation was first proposed in 1756, and it formed the basis by which British Museum staff could identify what was missing when the collection came into their possession. The layout of Capell's catalogue is idiosyncratic and difficult to use. In constructing a more up-to-date catalogue George Kahrl writes that "the overall arrangement of the [Capell] catalogue baffles understanding, and as a working tool it is worthless and frustrating".

The earliest item in the collection, a Wynkyn de Worde printing of Robert the Devil, dates from around 1517. The latest item is a collected edition of William Wycherley's Plays printed in 1735.

The collection, as received by the Museum in April 1780, did not include Garrick's copy of Shakespeare's First Folio, which remained the property of Garrick's wife, Eva Maria. Following her death in 1822 the remainder of Garrick's library, including the Shakespeare volume, was sold at auction. The folio passed through several hands before being bought by Queen's College, Oxford, in the mid-nineteenth century.

== Use of the collection during Garrick's lifetime ==
David Garrick's collection of old plays was well known during his lifetime and he made it available to friends and acquaintances. Various contemporary works make reference to his library.

In his introduction to the 1760 edition of John Dryden's collected works, Samuel Derrick wrote that "we are particularly obliged to Mr. Garrick, who with great civility gave us the use of his fine collection of old 4to [i.e. quarto] plays."

Isaac Reed, the editor of the 1780 edition of Robert Dodsley's A select collection of old plays, wrote that "The present volumes were originally compiled from the only collection then known to exist, that which had been formed by the Earls of Oxford. This afterwards came into the possession of the late Mr. Garrick; and, with great additions, hath since been bequeathed by him to the British Museum. The mention of this gentleman's name naturally reminds the Editor, that he should be deficient in point of gratitude, if he omitted to notice the readiness with which he was allowed the free use of whatever Mr. Garrick's library contained for the service of this work."

== Collection in the British Museum and Library ==
Garrick's collection was transferred to the Museum in 1780 and was said to have been delivered from the actor's home in the Adelphi to the British Museum on a hand cart escorted by three Museum representatives. Since then it can be said to have had a turbulent history.

In 1767 the British Museum had been authorised by the British Museum Act 1767 "to exchange, sell, or dispose of, any duplicates of printed books ... laying out the money arising by such sale, in the purchase of other things that may be wanting in, or proper for, the said Museum". The first such sale took place in 1769 and raised £564. The second sale occurred in March 1788 and raised £529. Included in the later sale were approximately 43 items from the Garrick Collection identified as duplicate items and deemed inferior to copies already in the Museum's possession. The checking of copies was, however, not rigorous and the Museum ended up selling unique editions and printings.

In the period 1805-06 the museum implemented a policy of transferring items from other collections to supplement the now incomplete Garrick Collection. This was in part to allow for a new subject arrangement of the Museum's rooms. Twenty items were removed from the Thomason Collection and at least three from the Sloane Collection. The sources of other transferred items cannot be identified.

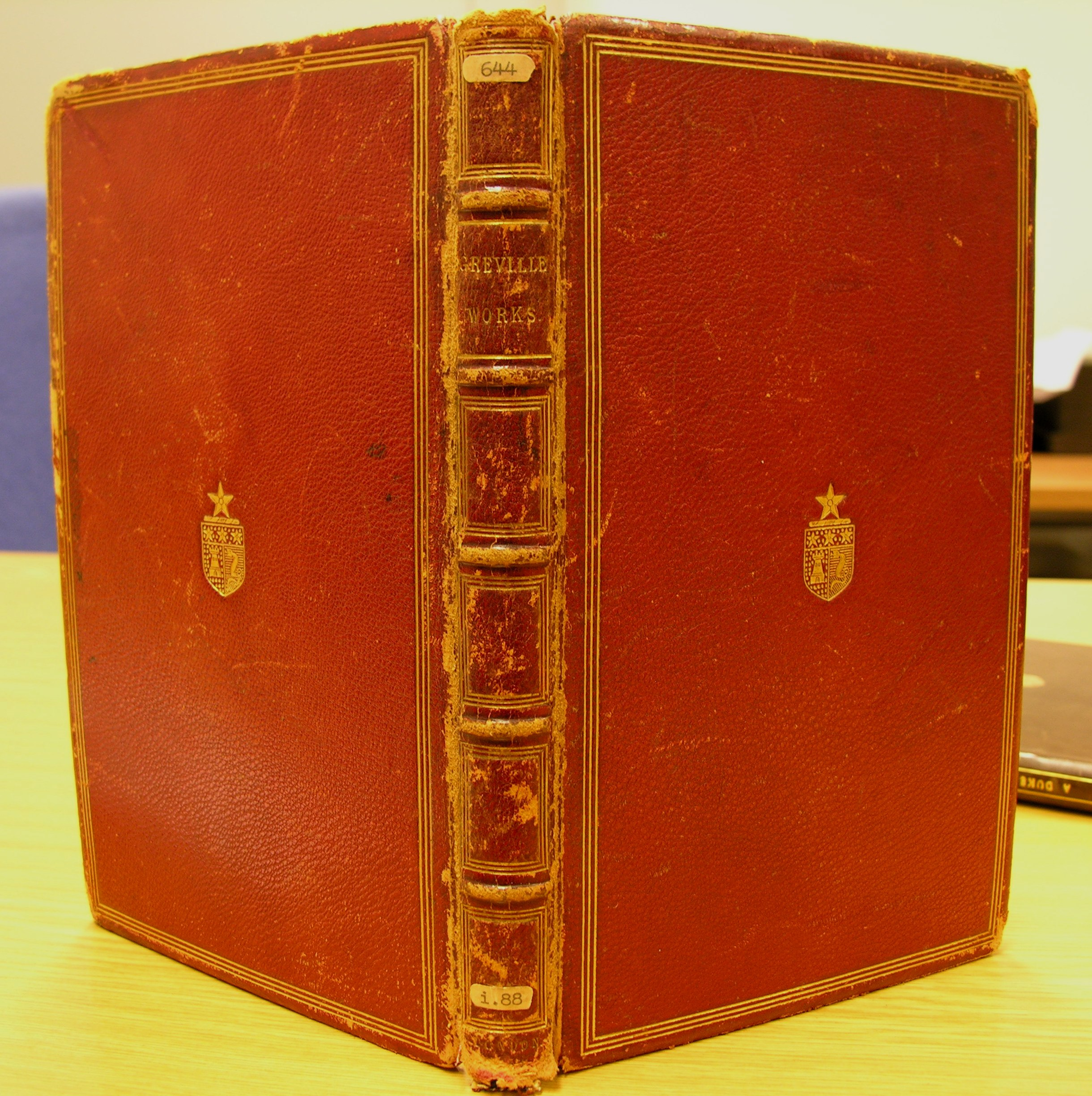
David Garrick's copy of Fulke Greville's Workes, showing the family arms on the binding.

In 1840 Anthony Panizzi, the Museum's Keeper of Printed Books, recommended that the Garrick Collection, still largely bound in tract volumes, be broken up and the items bound individually. Although there was opposition to this plan from within and without the Museum, in 1841 the Trustees gave their approval, and by the beginning of 1846 the rebinding programme was completed. During the process of breaking up the tract volumes Museum staff had taken the opportunity to more closely examine the individual printed items with the view to making copies more perfect. Approximately twenty Garrick items were improved in various ways: some by the addition of facsimile leaves, others through the exchange of leaves between duplicates. In some instances leaves were removed from Garrick items to improve plays in the King's Library.

The last recorded disturbance of the Garrick Collection was announced in October 1956. A significant number of leaves stolen from British Museum items were identified as being bound in volumes in Thomas J. Wise's Ashley Library, a collection acquired by the Museum in 1937. Further investigations proved that stolen leaves were also present in the collection that Wise had assisted John Henry Wrenn in amassing (the Wrenn Library is held at the University of Texas's Harry Ransom Center). In total 206 leaves were identified as being stolen, the majority of these from the Garrick Collection. The worst example of theft occurred in the Garrick copy of James Shirley's play of 1640, The Opportunity, which lost seventeen leaves.

== Major studies ==
A comprehensive study of the Garrick Collection by George Kahrl and Dorothy Anderson was published in 1982 under the title The Garrick Collection of old English plays: a catalogue with an historical introduction.
