= Gonzalo Crespí de Valldaura, 20th Count of Orgaz =

Spanish historian and bibliophile (1936–2022)

Gonzalo Crespí de Valldaura y Bosch-Labrús, 20th Count of Orgaz (Madrid, 25 March 1936 – Madrid, 25 February 2022) was a Spanish nobleman, historian and bibliophile, businessman and philanthropist.

== Biography ==
He studied at Lycée Français de Madrid and Colegio del Pilar. He earned a degree in Geography and History from UNED, which was also from where he later earned a doctorate in History. He inherited his titles upon his father's death in 1960.

He opened his extensive family archive in Ávila, one of the most important private archives in Spain, dating back to the 13th century, to researchers. His own research into his ancestors' medieval seigneurie has been published as Diario del señor D. Cristoval Crespí desde el día en que fue nombrado presidente del Consejo de Aragón (BOE, 2012), Señorío de Orgaz, 1220-1520: estudio genealógico, patrimonial y jurisdiccional (2013 doctoral thesis), and Los señores de Orgaz, 1220-1520 (Círculo Rojo, 2020).

He oversaw significant philanthropic work. In the 1980s, with Infanta Pilar de Borbón, he founded the development aid non-governmental organisation Ayuda en Acción, which he presided from 1981 to 2003. He was also president of the Spanish Assembly of the Sovereign Military Order of Malta, that focuses on medical and social assistance, from 2003 and 2013.

From 1999 to 2006, he was president of the Association internationale de bibliophilie. He was a founding member and president (2009–2021) of the Friends of the National Library of Spain Foundation.
