= Graham Pollard =

British bookseller

- Born: Henry Graham Pollard; 7 March 1903; Putney, London
- Died: 15 November 1976 (aged 73); Radcliffe Infirmary, Oxford
- Education: University College London; Jesus College, Oxford
- Spouse: Kay Beauchamp (dissolved 1972)
- Parent: Albert Pollard

Henry Graham Pollard (known as Graham Pollard) (7 March 1903 – 15 November 1976) was a British bookseller and bibliographer.

== Early life ==
Pollard was the son of the historian Albert Pollard and was born in Putney, London on 7 March 1903. After studying at Shrewsbury School, Pollard studied history for one year at University College London before winning a scholarship to Jesus College, Oxford in 1921, obtaining a third-class degree in history in 1924. At Oxford he was part of the Hypocrites' Club. In that year he married Kay Beauchamp, pioneering Communist and women's rights campaigner. Their marriage was dissolved in 1972.

== Career ==
Even whilst he was a student, he was well known as a book collector, and bought part of a booksellers' business (Birrell and Garnett) in London. He became managing director in 1927, with the company producing many noted catalogues in the 1920s and 1930s, some of which were to become standard works of reference. Pollard's knowledge of his subject was displayed in his contributions to The Cambridge Bibliography of English Literature and in his lectures and articles. With John Carter, he wrote An Enquiry into the Nature of Certain Nineteenth Century Pamphlets (1934), exposing the prominent book collector Thomas J. Wise as a fraud.

In 1937, Harry Carter, Ellic Howe, Alfred F. Johnson, Stanley Morison and Graham Pollard started to produce a list of all known pre-1800 type specimens. The list was published in The Library in 1942. However, because of the war, many libraries at the European continent were not accessible anymore.

In 1939, the bookshop partnership ended and Pollard became a special lecturer at University College, London before joining the Board of Trade in 1942; whilst this was supposedly a temporary appointment, he remained until retirement in 1959. He maintained his bibliographical interests, publishing an edition of The Earliest Directory of the Book Trade by John Pendred (1785), and lecturing in Cambridge shortly before his retirement.

In 1960-1961 he held the Lyell Readership in Bibliography at the University of Oxford and lectured on "The Medieval Book Trade in Oxford."

During his retirement, he was president from 1960 to 1962 of The Bibliographical Society, which awarded him its gold medal in 1969. He also lectured in the United States in 1973, and received a volume of essays published in his honour by the Oxford Bibliographical Society in 1975. He died at the Radcliffe Infirmary on 15 November 1976.

The "Graham Pollard Memorial Lecture" in his memory is given annually. In 2025 the lecture, "The Stationers and the Poor Law," was given by David Shaw.

In 2018, it was alleged in Henry Hemming's M: Maxwell Knight, MI5's Greatest Spymaster that Pollard spied on the Communist Party for Maxwell Knight and the British security services.
