= The Guild of the Pope's Peace =

Former Catholic organisation in Great Britain

The Guild of the Pope's Peace was a short-lived Roman Catholic organisation in Great Britain opposed to the First World War. Set up in 1916 to disseminate and promote Pope Benedict XV's utterances in favour of an immediate negotiated peace, the organisation lasted for one year and produced a series of publications also memorable for their attention to typographical detail. Beyond its propagation of an anti-war stance within the British Catholic community, it was notable as an early project of founders Francis Meynell and Stanley Morison, who would later go on to become well-known typographers.

== Background ==
Less than a month after the commencement of the First World War, in late July 1914, the reigning Pope Pius X died. His successor Benedict XV adopted a position of impartiality from his ascension, favouring immediate peace negotiations. The Guild of the Pope's Peace was established to print, distribute and promote Benedict’s appeals and writings in an effort to mobilise opposition to the war amongst Britain's Catholics. The Guild's efforts were largely unsuccessful, meeting widespread hostility from prominent English Catholics and seeing its position rejected by the Catholic hierarchy in Britain, principal Catholic laymen and the Catholic press. Contemporary pro-war hysteria in British society condemned the organisation's efforts to failure, and it disappeared roughly a year after its founding. It was a forerunner of the British branch of Pax Christi, the international Catholic peace movement, via its first president E.I. Watkin who was the niece of Francis Meynell.

In August 2009, the British Security Service MI5 released documents relating to the period 1916–1949, concerning "Communists and suspected Communists" operating in Britain during that time. These files, KV 2/3041-42, show that the security services were actively monitoring Francis Meynell for his anti-war activities and pro-communist sensibilities. They show how The Guild of Pope’s Peace was suspected of undermining the war effort, as well as being seen as potentially pro-German, owing to its Catholic focus.

== Founders ==
Guild of the Pope's Peace was founded by the typographer, book-designer, poet and publisher Francis Meynell⁣ – who for a time chaired the No-Subscription Fellowship – and another who would later become a celebrated typographer Stanley Morison. The pair carried socialist sympathies and were active Conscientious objectors during the Great War. Morrison's appeal against conscription on religious and moral grounds was rejected in 1916 and he was eventually forced to accept alternative employment. Meynell was also a contentious objector, and collapsed at Hounslow Barracks after refusing food and drink for ten days, an event that hastened his discharge. He went on to found the Anglo-Russian Democratic Alliance in March 1917, was assistant editor of The Herald, subsequently The Daily Herald, and later was editor of The Communist.
