= Thomas Kimball Brooker =

American bibliophile

Thomas Kimball Brooker (born October 1, 1939) is a bibliophile, scholar and businessman.

== Education and military service ==
Brooker graduated from Yale University in 1962. He served in the Navy Supply Corps 1962–1966 as lieutenant. He graduated from Harvard Business School in 1968 and his Master's thesis was "Rare Books as a Hedge against Devaluation and Inflation."

Brooker received the M.A. in Art History at the University of Chicago in 1989. His master's paper topic was "The Diffusion of Binding Styles in the Sixteenth Century between Italy and France." He received the PhD at the University of Chicago in 1996. His doctoral dissertation was "Upright Works: The Emergence of the Vertical Library in the Sixteenth Century."

== Business career ==
Brooker was employed by Morgan Stanley in New York in 1968 working in the Corporate Finance Department, promoted to vice president in 1973 and managing director in 1976. Since 1989 he has been president of Barbara Oil Company.

He served on the Board of Directors of the NYSE Chicago.

== Bibliophile ==
In 1962, as a senior at Yale, Brooker was awarded the Adrian Van Sinderen Prize which encourages undergraduate students to collect books, build their own libraries and read for pleasure and education. He became a member of the Grolier Club in 1962.

In 1992 he was honored with the Sir Thomas More Medal for Book Collecting, "Private Collecting for the Public Good," by the University of San Francisco Gleeson Library and the Gleeson Library Associates.

The T. Kimball Brooker Undergraduate Book Collecting Prize was endowed at the University of Chicago in 1994.

Brooker is a Trustee of the Morgan Library and Museum in New York and the Newberry Library in Chicago.

Brooker is a member of the Association Internationale de Bibliophilie serving as president from 2006 to 2013. He published in its journal, Bulletin du bibliophile, the oldest bibliophilic journal, notably, "Bindings Commissioned for Francis I's 'Italian Library' with Horizontal Spine Titles Dating from the Late 1530s to 1540."

Throughout his life, Brooker has collected over 1,300 sixteenth-century French and Italian books in their original bindings. The collection was offered at Sotheby's during 2023–2025 as Bibliotheca Brookeriana: The T. Kimball Brooker Library of Renaissance Books and Bindings. The collection includes around 1,000 Aldines published between the 1490s and the 1590s—the largest Aldine collection to come to market in over a century.

He is a member of the Caxton Club of Chicago and funds an annual scholarship for attendance at the Rare Book School.

In 2020, Brooker was patron of the exhibit, "Poetry and Patronage: The Laubespine-Villeroy Library Rediscovered." at the Morgan Library and Museum.

== Selected publications ==
- T. Kimball Brooker, ed., Association Internationale de Bibliophilie, Actes et Communications/InternationalAssociation of Bibliophiles, Transactions, XXVlIIth Congress, Munich, Regensburg, Augsburg, Eichstätt, & Neuberg and Post-Congress, Nuremberg, Bamberg, Pommersfelden & Erlangen, 2013, New York, Jerry Kelly. 2019.
- T. Kimball Brooker & Carol Z. Rothkopf, eds., Association Internationale de Bibliophilie, Actes et Communications/International Association of Bibliophiles, Transactions, XXVIth Congress, Austria, 2009, New York, Jerry Kelly, 2017.
- T. Kimball Brooker, ed., Association Internationale de Bibliophilie, Actes et Communications/International Association of Bibliophiles, Transactions, Poland. XXVIlth Congress, Krakow & Warsaw & Post-Congress, Toruń, Peplin & Gdansk, 2011, New York, Jerry Kelly, 2017.
- T. Kimball Brooker, "The Library of Antoine Perrenot de Granvelle," Bulletin du Bibliophile, 20l5. pages 23–72.
- T. Kimball Brooker. Index of Best Authors : By Subject Classification Compiled in 1547 by Antoine Morillon for Antoine Perrenot De Granvelle Including a Selection of Greek Manuscripts in the Library of Diego Hurtado De Mendoza: Besançon, Bibliothèque Municipale, Ms Granvelle 90, Ff. 11-18v. 2014. Association internationale de bibliophilie.
- T. Kimball Brooker, "The Institut de France and the Bibliothèque Mazarine: Seventeenth-Century Cultural Treasures," The Grolier Club: Iter Gallico-Helveticum: A Bibliophilic Tour of Paris & Alsace & Geneva, New York, The Grolier Club, 2013, pages 35–41.
- T. Kimball Brooker, "Student Book Collecting Contests Sponsored by American Colleges and Universities," Bulletin du Bibliophile, 2012, pages 217–227.
- T. Kimball Brooker & Carol Z. Rothkopf, eds., Association Internationale de Bibliophilie, Actes et Communications / International Association of Bibliophiles, Transactions XXVth Congress, New York City & Post-Congress, Chicago, 2007, New York, Jerry Kelly, 2011.
- T. Kimball Brooker, "Who Was L.T.?" The Book Collector, Winter 1998:508-519 and Spring 1999: pages 32–53.
- T. Kimball Brooker. "Paolo Manutio's Use of Fore-edge Titles for Presentation Copies (1540-1541)" The Book Collector 46 (number 1) Spring 1997: 27-68 and 46 (no.2) Summer 1997: pages 193–209.
- T. Kimball Brooker, "Bindings Commissioned for Francis I's 'Italian Library' with Horizontal Spine Titles Dating from the Late 1530s to 1540," Bulletin du Bibliophile. 1997: pages 33–91.
