= Printing and the Mind of Man =

Survey on the impact of printed books on Western civilization

- Publisher: British Museum, London
- Publication date: 1967

Printing and the Mind of Man is a book first published in 1967 and based on an exhibition in 1963.

PMM, as it is usually abbreviated, is regarded as a standard bibliographical reference, and offers a survey of the impact of printed books on the development of Western civilization.

== The IPEX Exhibition ==
The book developed from an exhibition put on at two locations to coincide with the 1963 International Printing Machinery and Allied Trades Exhibition (IPEX). The IPEX exhibition "foreshadowed the impending impact of electronics and presaged the demise of prepress mechanics and craft practices." It is regarded as marking a significant transition in printing.

At the behest of typographer Stanley Morison it was decided to put together an exhibition of the contribution printing had made to the enlargement of human knowledge in connection with the IPEX. A display at Earls Court concentrated on the technical side of printing, while a display at the British Museum looked more at fine printing. However, both displays had the quite novel intention of promoting the study of books for their role in advancing factual knowledge, rather than for their aesthetics.

Ian Fleming, who lent 40 books from his library, was among the private collectors who contributed to the exhibition. The Fleming Collection, central to the exhibit, is now at the Lilly Library of the Indiana University Bloomington. A detailed review of the negotiations that resulted in the Lilly Library's acquisition, "Books That Had Started Something," provides copies of correspondence between the Fleming estate and the library. The Fleming Collection was an attempt to gather together, in first editions, the original contributions of the scientists and practical workers, the total body of whose work has been responsible for the modern revolution.

The exhibition catalogue, which was printed by Oxford University Press ("[London]: F.W. Bridges; obtainable from the British Museum"), edited by John Carter, Stanley Morison, Percy H. Muir and others, and titled: Catalogue of a display of printing mechanisms and printed materials arranged to illustrate the history of Western civilization and the means of the multiplication of literary texts since the 15th century, organised in connection with the eleventh International Printing Machinery and Allied Trades Exhibition, under the title Printing and the Mind of Man, assembled at the British Museum and at Earls Court, London, 16–27 July 1963, might be considered the pre-first edition of PMM.

"Exhibiting the Printed Book" by David McKitterick examined the 1963 PMM exhibition as a case study in how exhibitions shape bibliographical narratives.

== PMM as book ==
A book-length edition, revised and enlarged, was printed at Cambridge University Press and published in 1967 by Cassell in London and Holt, Rinehart & Winston in New York. This first book edition was entitled 'Printing and the Mind of Man: A Descriptive Catalogue Illustrating the Impact of Print on the Evolution of Western Civilization During Five Centuries. It was edited by John Carter and Percy Muir and expanded upon the theme of the impact of printing on human thought. It was published in Germany in 1968 and in Japan in 1977.

A second revised edition was published in 1983 by Karl Pressler in Munich (ISBN 3-9800047-3-2).

The Winter, 2023 issue of The Book Collector provides a sixty-year retrospective. It includes a review of correspondence between Muir and Carter by James Fleming.
