= John Carter (writer) =

British writer and bibliographer (1905–1975)

John Waynflete Carter (10 May 1905 – 18 March 1975) was an English writer, diplomat, bibliographer, book-collector, antiquarian bookseller and president of the Bibliographical Society in 1968. He was recognised as one of the most important figures in the Anglo-American book world. He was the great-grandson of Canon T. T. Carter

== Biography ==
After attending Eton College, he studied classics at King's College, Cambridge, where he gained a double first. He then joined Scrivner's working two periods 1927–1939 and 1946–1953 building up the antiquarian bookselling side.

During World War II he worked for the Ministry of Information until 1943 and then moved to New York City to work for the British Information Services where he wrote Victory in Burma.

He held the Sandars Readership in Bibliography at Cambridge University in 1947 and lectured on Taste and technique in book collecting: a study of recent developments in Great Britain and the United States. The Sandars Readership is one of the major British bibliographical lecture series.

He returned to Scrivner's after the War until it closed its London Office in 1953. He then worked for Roger Makins, British Ambassador to the United States until 1955 and was made a CBE.

In 1955 he joined Sotheby's where he worked closely with Anthony Hobson. He was associate director until 1972.

Carter was the husband of the writer and curator Ernestine Carter and the brother of the printer Will Carter (1912–2001) of the Rampant Lions Press, at which some of his smaller-scale works were published.

He was buried in the cemetery at Eton and Housman's poem, XLVII – FOR MY FUNERAL, "O thou that from thy mansion" was read at the service.

== An Enquiry into the Nature of Certain Nineteenth Century Pamphlets ==
Carter's 1934 exposé, An Enquiry into the Nature of Certain Nineteenth Century Pamphlets, co-written with Graham Pollard, exposed the forgeries of books and pamphlets by Harry Buxton Forman, an editor of Keats and Shelley, and Thomas J. Wise, one of the world's most prominent book collectors. Forman and Wise's crimes are generally regarded as one of the most notorious literary scandals of the twentieth century.

In 1983 he co-authored a sequel to the Enquiry.

== Writing, editing and bibliographical work ==
Carter wrote seminal books on aspects of book collecting, notably ABC for Book Collectors, a classic which was published in many editions. Carter first published the ABC in 1952 and edited five editions. Nicholas Barker produced the sixth, seventh and eighth editions (1980) and was joined by co-editor, Simran Thadani, for the ninth.

He served on the board of directors of the journal, The Book Collector, published by Queen Anne Press, a company managed by Ian Fleming creator of James Bond.

In 1963 Carter was instrumental in organising Printing and the Mind of Man, an exhibition of the contribution printing had made to the enlargement of human knowledge. The exhibit catalogue, printed by Oxford University Press was edited by John Carter, Stanley Morison, Percy Muir and others: Catalogue of a display of printing mechanisms and printed materials arranged to illustrate the history of Western civilisation and the means of the multiplication of literary texts since the 15th century, organised in connection with the eleventh International Printing Machinery and Allied Trades Exhibition, under the title Printing and the Mind of Man, assembled at the British Museum and at Earls Court, London, 16–27 July 1963. Carter spoke at the Double Crown Club in honour of Morrison, "The wise affair: printing and the mind of man", in 1967.

Carter also edited the prose of the poet A. E. Housman and two editions of A.E. Housman: Bibliography.

He was also a humorist and writer of clerihews, whimsical, four-line biographical poems, some of which were printed by Will Carter at the Rampant Lions Press in 1938.

In 1975 he won the Gold Medal from the Bibliographical Society.

An auction of Carter's collection of printed books was held at Sotheby's in 1976.

== Selected works ==
- ABC for book collectors. 8th ed. edited by Nicolas Barker. New Castle, Del.: Oak Knoll Press; London: British Library, 2004. ISBN 0-7123-4822-0 (British Library) ISBN 1-58456-112-2 (Oak Knoll); a classic, first published in 1952.
- Taste and technique in book-collecting, with an epilogue. Pinner, Middlesex: Private Libraries Association, 1970 (The Sandars Lectures in Bibliography, 1947). ISBN 0-900002-30-1
- Carter, John; Muir, Percy H. (1967). Printing and the Mind of Man: A Descriptive Catalogue Illustrating the Impact of Print on the Evolution of Western Civilization During Five Centuries. London: Cassell; New York: Holt, Rinehart & Winston. OCLC 576854.
- Carter, John. 1934. New Paths in Book Collecting : Essays by Various Hands; John Carter, John T. Winterlich, P.H. Muir [and Others]. London: Constable & Co.
- Binding variants in English publishing: 1820–1900. London: Constable; New York: Ray Long & Richard R. Smith, 1932.
- More binding variants. London: Constable, 1938.
- Publisher's cloth ... 1820–1900. New York: Bowker; London: Constable, 1935. Reprinted 1970.

== Bibliography ==
- Dickinson, Donald C., John Carter: the taste & technique of a bookman. Oak Knoll Press, New Castle, Del., 2004. ISBN 1-58456-137-8
- Munby, A.N.L. (1975) "John Carter." The Book Collector 24 (summer): 202-216.
