= Harry Carter (typographer) =

English typographer and writer (1901–1982)

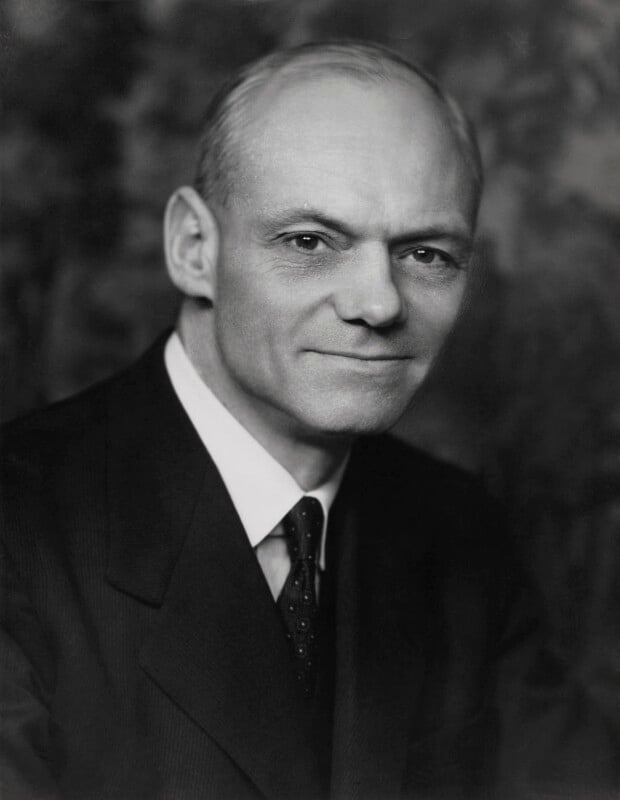
- Carter in 1951
- Born: Harry Graham Carter; 27 March 1901
- Died: 10 March 1982 (aged 80)
- Education: Bedales School
- Occupations: Typographer; translator; writer
- Children: Matthew Carter

Harry Graham Carter (27 March 1901 – 10 March 1982) was an English typographer, translator and writer. He was a well-known historian of type. He was the father of type designer Matthew Carter.

== Biography ==
Carter studied at the progressive Bedales School (where he was a friend of John Rothenstein), and at The Queen's College, Oxford where he became competent in French, German, Spanish, and Russian. He would later learn Arabic, and design a Hebrew font. Though he was studying law, Carter became interested in typography and bought a printing press.

His first work with type came in 1928 and 1929 as an apprentice at the Monotype Corporation. At this time he formed friendships with Jan van Krimpen, Stanley Morison, Francis Meynell, and Oliver and Herbert Simon (cousins of his school-friend, John Rothenstein). He became involved the Curwen Press, and after leaving the Monotype Corporation worked briefly at the Kynoch Press in Birmingham. In 1931 he and Herbert Simon published Printing Explained.

From 1936 to 1938 he worked at the Nonesuch Press in London, as Meynell's book-designer. His son, Matthew Carter, was born in 1937. In 1937, Carter, Ellic Howe, Alfred F. Johnson, Stanley Morison and Graham Pollard started to produce a list of all known pre-1800 type specimens. The list was published in The Library in 1942. However, because of the war, many libraries on the European continent were not accessible anymore. In 1942 he translated Erasmus' In Praise of Folly into English.

During World War II he saw service in the Middle East. After the war, he worked for some eight years at HMSO, again under Meynell. In 1954 Carter was hired by Oxford University Press, where he worked for sixteen years. He was archivist and assistant to Stanley Morison as Morison worked on John Fell, published in 1967. He also cataloged thousands of matrices, punches, and fonts for the Plantin-Moretus Museum, and assisted Charles Enschede with his Typefoundries in the Netherlands.

Carter was the author and editor of books and articles on typography and the history of type. Notable among his writings are, The Wolvercote Mill: a study of paper-making at Oxford (1957); A View of Early Typography: Up to about 1600, (1969); and A History of the Oxford University Press. Volume I: To the Year 1780 (1975).

In 1967-1968 he held the Lyell Readership in Bibliography.
