= Association internationale de bibliophilie =

International society of bibliophiles

The Association internationale de bibliophilie (AIB; English: International Association of Bibliophiles) is a society of bibliophiles with the stated goal of providing a permanent link between bibliophiles from different countries, whether or not they belong to bibliophilic societies, and to facilitate the organisation of international meetings, such as exhibitions or congresses.

It was established on 10 October 1963. The idea for an international federation of bibliophiles was first put forward at the First International Congress of Bibliophily (held in Munich, 1959); it was discussed once again at the Second Congress (Paris, September–October 1961), with Julien Cain, the general administrator of the Bibliothèque nationale de France, appointed to chair a provisional administrative council that was tasked with drawing up the statutes of such an organisation, alongside several world-renowned collectors and specialists. At the Third Congress held in Barcelona, in 1963, the Cain proposals were formally adopted and the International Association of Bibliophiles was finally constituted as a legal and financial entity "without gainful purpose". It was based in Paris at the Bibliothèque nationale with its secretariat at the Bibliothèque de l'Arsenal.

Its first President was Julien Cain; he was succeeded by Frederick B. Adams Jr. from 1974 to 1983. Anthony Hobson was President of the AIB from 1985 to 1999. Its President from 1999 to 2006 was the Count of Orgaz, from 2006 to 2013, Thomas Kimball Brooker, and from 2013 to 2024, Jean Bonna. Currently, its President is Kenneth Pfaehler.

Bulletin du bibliophile, the oldest bibliophilic journal still in print, founded in 1834, is currently published under the aegis of the International Association of Bibliophiles.
