= David Pearson (librarian) =

Librarian

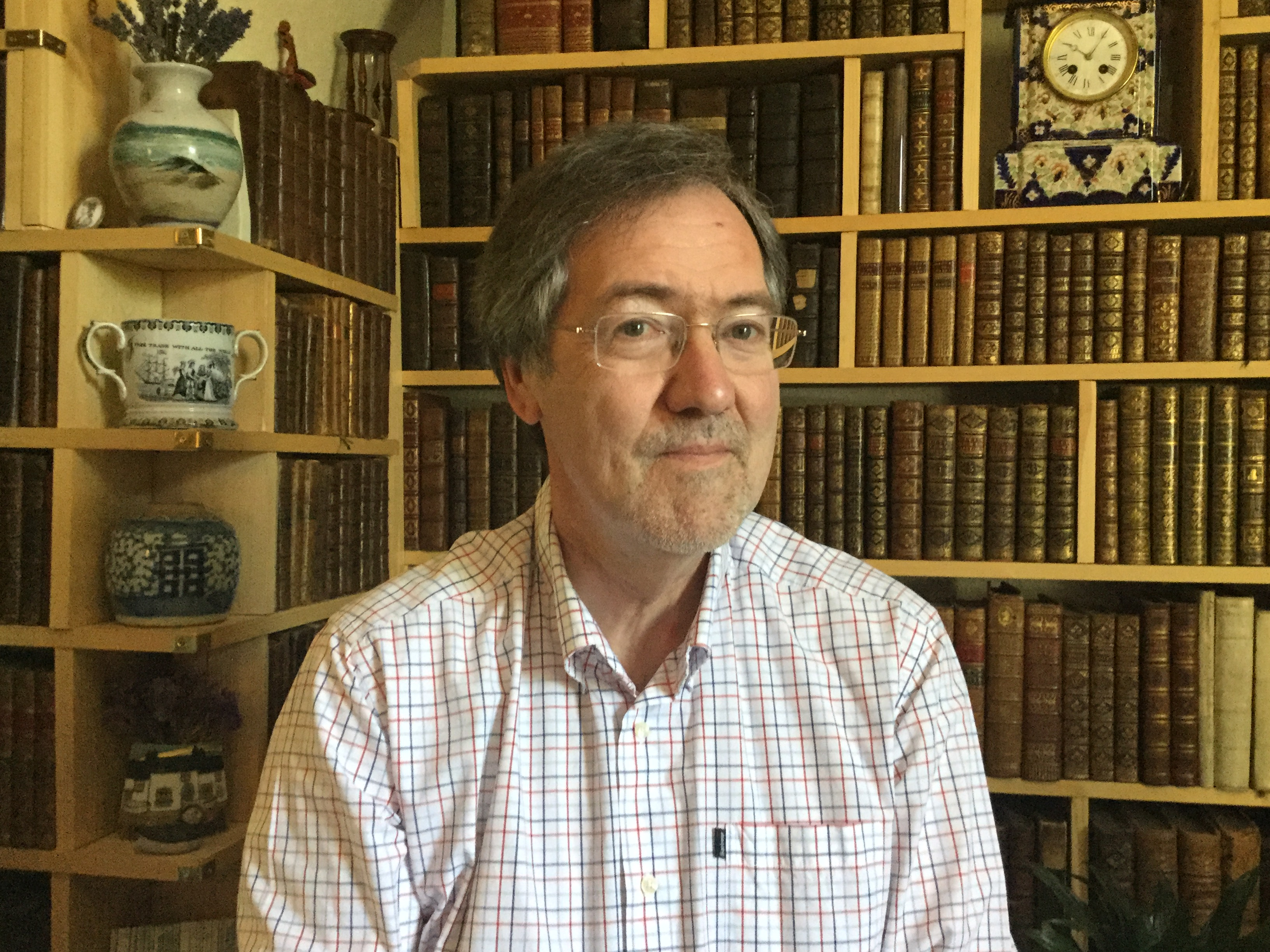
- David Pearson in 2018
- Born: 1958 (age 67–68)
- Education: University of Cambridge
- Occupations: author, editor, librarian
- Known for: History of bookbinding
- Notable work: Provenance Research in Book History: A Handbook

David Pearson (born 1955) is an English librarian who served as the Director of Culture, Heritage and Libraries at the City of London Corporation between 2009 and 2017; his brief covered London Metropolitan Archives, Guildhall Library, City Business Library, Guildhall Art Gallery, and other institutions. He retired in early 2017 to focus on his work in book history and was a Senior Member of Darwin College, Cambridge until 2024.

He is Honorary Senior Research Associate of the Department of Information Studies, University College London (from 2016); and Distinguished Senior Fellow of the School of Advanced Study, University of London (from 2022). A member of the Faculty of the Rare Book School at the University of Virginia, he teaches regularly at the London Rare Book School.

== Education ==
Pearson was educated at St Bees School (1967–1973) and is a graduate of the University of Cambridge (1974–1977, MA, PhD), and University of Loughborough (1980–81, Dip.Lib)."

== Career ==
Pearson was Director of the University of London Research Library Services (2004–2009), Librarian of the Wellcome Trust (1996–2004), Head of Special Collections at the National Art Library (1992–1996) and a curator in the Eighteenth-Century Short Title Catalogue project at the British Library (1986–1992).

He has lectured and published extensively on aspects of book history, with a particular emphasis on books as artefacts, and the ways in which they have been owned and bound. His books include Provenance Research in Book History (1994, new edition 2019), Oxford Bookbinding 1500-1640 (2000), For the Love of the Binding (ed, 2000), English Bookbinding Styles 1450-1800 (2005, reprinted 2014), Books as History : The importance of books beyond their texts (2008), London: 1000 Years (ed, 2011), Book Ownership in Stuart England (2021), Speaking Volumes: Books with Histories (2022), Cambridge Bookbinding 1450-1770 (2023), Bookbindings: an illustrated history (2026). In 2020 he launched the online database Book Owners Online.

Pearson was President of the Bibliographical Society, 2010–2012.

He was J. P. R. Lyell Reader in Bibliography, University of Oxford in 2017–2018. He delivered the Lyell Lectures on the topic "Book Ownership in Stuart England".

Pearson held the Sandars Readership in Bibliography at Cambridge University in 2023-2024 and lectured on "Cambridge Bookbinding, 1450–1700."

He became editor of The Book Collector in 2025.

== Selected publications ==
- Pearson, David. 2023. Cambridge Bookbinding: 1450-1770. Ann Arbor, Michigan: The Legacy Press.
- Pearson, David. 2022. Speaking Volumes: Books with Histories. Oxford: Bodleian Library Publishing.
- Pearson, David. 2021. Book Ownership in Stuart England. First edition. Oxford, United Kingdom: Oxford University Press.
- Pearson, David. 2019. Provenance Research in Book History: A Handbook. New and revised edition. London, New Castle, Delaware: The Bodleian Library, Oak Knoll Press.
- Pearson, David. 2010. "Patterns of Book Ownership in Late Seventeenth-Century England." The Library: The Transactions of the Bibliographical Society 11 (2): 139–67.
- Pearson, David. 2008. Books as History: The Importance of Books beyond Their Texts. London, New Castle, DE: British Library; Oak Knoll Press.
- Pearson, David. 2005. English Bookbinding Styles, 1450-1800: A Handbook. London, New Castle, DE: British Library; Oak Knoll Press.
