= Iain Bain =

Scottish historian of printing

Iain Bain (1934–2018) FSA was a Scottish historian of printing. He worked at Unwin Brothers and then was production manager at Bodley Head and lastly as head of publications at the Tate Gallery. He was president of the Thomas Bewick Society and of the Printing Historical Society. In his youth he was Scottish hammer champion at school and at university.
