= IPEX (trade show) =

Printing and graphic arts trade show

The International Printing Machinery and Allied Trades Exhibition (IPEX) was the longest running printing and graphic arts trade show in the English-speaking world. The trade show was held every four years except for the final show, which was held after three years. IPEX was an international event, serving both the UK and the international print industry.

In 1963 the exhibition Printing and the Mind of Man held in connection with IPEX "foreshadowed the impending impact of electronics and presaged the demise of prepress mechanics and craft practices." Writer, Ian Fleming, a collector of rare books on technology, was a major contributor to the exhibition.

IPEX 2017 took place at the NEC, Birmingham, UK, on 31 October - 3 November 2017. In 2018 the organisers announced that the 2017 exhibition had been the last. Ipex was thought to be the world's longest running trade expo, with its first outing in 1880. The show had seen decades of success when it switched to Birmingham's National Exhibition Centre in 1980, from its previous Earls Court home, attracting almost 100,000 visitors in the following years. It alternated every two years with mega print trade show drupa, and successfully attracted print business owners from around the world, from Europe - as they could fly to the airport located right next door - and the Commonwealth countries in particular.

It launched numerous technologies, most notably digital printing, with Indigo and Xeikon both debuting worldwide at the 1993 show. Both companies went on to achieve huge success, albeit on the back of several ownership changes in the volatile early years, when their technology was largely decried by print businesses.

The decline of Ipex followed the decision to relocate the 2014 exhibition from the NEC to the Excel Centre in east London. While the NEC offered direct air, rail, and road connections, the Excel Centre presented different transport logistics for attendees and exhibitors. Following this move, major exhibitor Heidelberg withdrew from the event, which was followed by the departure of other exhibitors and ultimately led to the end of the show and a reduction in UK print trade exhibitions.

== See also ==
- Drupa, the largest printing equipment exhibition in the world
