= The Book Collector =

English journal concerned with book collecting

The Book Collector is a London-based journal that deals with all aspects of the book.

It is published quarterly and exists in both paper and digital form. It prints independent opinions on subjects ranging from typography to national heritage policy, from medieval libraries to modern first editions. It has run series on Unfamiliar Libraries, Literary and Scientific Autographs, Author Societies, Bookbinding, Contemporary Collectors, Bibliophiles, and many other subjects. The editor is David Pearson.

== History ==
A precursor to the Book Collector was the Book Handbook, issued serially in nine parts in 1951.

The Book Collector was launched by the novelist Ian Fleming in the same year, 1952, that he wrote the first James Bond novel, Casino Royale. In 2017, this was discussed at the TLS (Times Literary Supplement).

The first editor was John Davy Hayward, the friend and muse of T. S. Eliot.

Nicolas Barker, sometime publisher and first head of conservation at the British Library edited for fifty years. He gave a presentation on the history of The Book Collector at the Caxton Club in 1998.

On fifty years of its publication Thomas Tanselle noted, "for over a half-century now, THE BOOK COLLECTOR has been demonstrating --to experienced book people and to newcomers alike--the reciprocal relationship, the inextricable connection, between bibliophily and scholarship."

James Fergusson, founding obituaries editor of The Independent, 1986–2007, was editor from 2015 until 2018.

The editor from 2018 to 2024 was author, James Fleming. His essay, “The Price of Passion: Indexing The Book Collector," illuminated the journal's history.

In 2025 David Pearson, former Director of Culture, Heritage and Libraries at the City of London Corporation, was appointed editor.

Essays about book collecting by Geoffrey Keynes in the Book Collector have been published in a compilation volume.

== Highlights ==
Some articles of particular interest include "Our Literary Banquet," a fantasy banquet for bibliophiles with place settings (2021); "National Trust Libraries"(2005); "In Search of Missing Copies of Shakespeare's First Folio"(1994); “The Elmer Belt Library of Vinciana”(1989); "Russian Bookbinding from the 11th to the Middle of the 17th Century;" and a series on the Biblotheca Thuana.

In 1967 The Book Collector published a special issue on the November 4, 1966 Floods of Florence.

In a 1997 a Special Number for the 150th Anniversary of Bernard Quaritch was published.

In 2023 the winter issue was devoted to the history of Printing and the Mind of Man.

== Publication ==
The Book Collector publishes four times a year in March, June, September and December. Each issue consists of 192pp and is sent to subscribers by airmail, where appropriate. Subscribers also have digital access to every issue of The Book Collector, as printed, since its first appearance in 1952 and to its predecessor Book Handbook, which was published in twenty-eight numbers between 1947 and 1951. There is no restriction for libraries and other institutions on the number of digital users. The Book Collector's website holds its complete archive, indexed.

== Podcasts ==
The Book Collector produces podcasts on SoundCloud. Episodes include: "Ian Fleming: A Personal Memoir" by P.H. Muir, read by Rupert Vansittart; "Portrait Of A Bibliophile XVI: John Ruskin 1819–1900" by James S. Dearden; and 'Scribes in Ice and Darkness' by Fergus Fleming.

== Publication details ==
- The Book Collector, London, The Collector Ltd, 1952, ISSN 0006-7237

== Additional Reading ==
- Hobson, Anthony. “Review: The Pleasures of Bibliophily: Fifty Years of The Book Collector [Reviews].” Library 5.1 (2004): 73–75
- Jackson, Ian. 2013. “The Book Collector: A Personal View.” Fellowship of American Bibliophilic Societies 17 (1): 9–11.

== See also ==
- Book trade in the United Kingdom
- Books in the United Kingdom
