= Ellic Howe =

British astrologer and writer

Ellic Paul Howe (20 September 1910 – 28 September 1991) was a British astrologer and writer on occultism and the Hermetic Order of the Golden Dawn as well as on typography and military history. During World War II he worked for Britain's Political Warfare Executive on psychological warfare and forgery techniques under the name 'Armin Hull'.

== Partial bibliography ==
=== Books on occultism ===
- Urania’s Children: the strange world of the astrologers (1967)
- Astrology: a recent history including the untold story of its role in World War II (1968)
- Astrology and psychological warfare during World War II (1972)
- Magicians of the Golden Dawn: A Documentary History of a Magical Order, 1887-1923 (1978)
- Alchemist of the Golden Dawn: The Letters of the Reverend W. A. Ayton to F. L. Gardner and Others, 1886-1905 (Roots of the Golden Dawn Series) edited by Ellic Howe (1985)
- Merlin Peregrinus: Vom Untergrund des Abendlandes (with Helmut Möller), Würzburg 1986
- Fringe Masonry in England, 1870-1885 (Golden Dawn Studies Series; No 12) (with Darcy Kuntz) (1997)

=== Books on military history ===
- The Black Game: British Subversive Operations Against the Germans During the Second World War (1982)

=== Books on typography and bookmaking ===
- Newspaper Printing in the Nineteenth century (1943)
- The Trade – Walter Hutchinson (1943)
- London Bookbinders: Masters and Men, 1780–1840 (1946)
- The London Compositor: Documents Relating to Wages, Working Conditions and Customs of the London Printing Trade, 1785–1900 (1947)
- The London Society of Compositors (Re-established 1848): A Centenary history (1948)
- French Type Specimen books (1951)
- The British Federation of Master Printers, 1900–1950 (1950)
- The Society of London Bookbinders, 1780–1951 (British trade union history collection) (1952)
- The Typecasters (The Monotype recorder) (1957)
- The Sales Conference: The Second of Richardsons' Newcastle Chapbooks, Telling how the Chairman and the Chief Chymist Invented a Bronze Blue Ink which Tasted Like Vintage Port, and Containing a Recital of the Subsequent Events, Transactions and Proceedings (1958)
- Harry Kweller and the Harkwell Press: A Fragment of Biography (1960)
