= Thomas James Wise =

British writer (1859–1937)

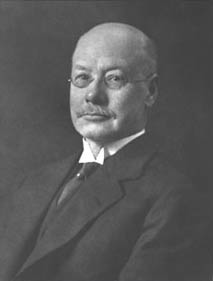
- Born: 7 October 1859
- Died: 13 May 1937 (aged 77)
- Spouse(s): Selina Fanny Smith, Frances Louise Greenhaigh
- Writing career
- Notable works: Bibliographies for many early poets and dramatists

Thomas James Wise (7 October 1859 – 13 May 1937) was a bibliophile, literary forger, and thief who collected the Ashley Library, now housed by the British Library.

== Collecting career ==
Wise began collecting books as a schoolboy, spending his pocket money at the barrows in Farringdon Street. He was a keen collector of first editions in original condition. His interests were poetry followed by drama and his collection dating back to Elizabethan publications was an exhaustive representation.

His collection was funded by selling duplicates and acting as an agent for wealthy collectors such as John Henry Wrenn. Wise was given an honorary M.A. degree by the University of Oxford and elected an honorary Fellow of Worcester College for his services to bibliographical science. He became a member of the Consultative Committee of the Friends of the Bodleian and was elected president of the Bibliographical Society in 1922–1924.

== Forgeries and thefts ==
Wise became a noted bibliographer, collector, forger, (Note: "The shock was accordingly the greater in 1934 when John W. Carter and Henry Graham Pollard published An Enquiry into the Nature of Certain Nineteenth Century Pamphlets, proving that about 40 or 50 of these, commanding high prices, were forgeries, and that all could be traced to Wise.") and thief. He exploited his international reputation as a collector of books and an exposer of forgers and forgeries into a career in creating and selling forgeries. (Note: He "had the reputation of being one of the most distinguished private book collectors on either side of the Atlantic, and his Ashley Library in London became a place of pilgrimage for scholars from Europe and the United States. He constantly exposed piracies and forgeries and always denied that he was a dealer.") He privately printed nearly 300 works of English authors, some of which were debunked as forgeries by Carter and Pollard.

In 1934 his reputation was damaged by the publication of "An Enquiry into the Nature of Certain Nineteenth Century Pamphlets" by John Carter and Graham Pollard. In their writing and exposé, Carter and Pollard were astute in their use of irony. (Note: "Like great ironists, like Alexander Pope himself, Carter and Pollard were the masters of a steely innocence such as could challengingly tighten the net upon the most proper sort of prey: a man of great power and prestige who was at last to be the victim of Nemesis and of her agents. Was there at work a descendant of the Renaissance forger Annius, sharp-eyed enough to profit from "the book-collecting renaissance of 1890"? 'There was one such man,' the authors write, 'who is the hero (or villain) of the present work.'") Carter and Pollard proved that a large number of rare first-edition pamphlets from 19th-century authors which depended solely on Wise's published works for their authenticity were fakes. Wise and a fellow bibliophile Harry Buxton Forman had been involved in the fabrication and sale of many of the same pamphlets to collectors. Forman and Wise's crimes are generally regarded as one of the most notorious literary scandals of the twentieth century.

Shortly after Wise's death the Library was sold to the British Museum by his widow for £66,000. (Note: "The purchase consists of about 7,000 volumes, both printed and in manuscript, and no comparable addition to the British Museum Library has been made since 1846, when Thomas Grenville bequeathed his collection.") The works were compared with the British Museum's former collection at which point it was discovered that over 200 book leaves were missing and 89 of these matching leaves were found in the Wise volumes. (Note: "...a total of 206 leaves were stolen from the Museum's early quartos. Eighty-nine of these have been identified in Ashley copies and sixty in Wrenn copies; up to fifteen more may be added to this total from three suspect Wrenn copies... my personal opinion is that the plays are probably the only class where thefts were widespread.") John Henry Wrenn had built up a drama collection (housed in the University of Texas) and Wise had helped with supplying these volumes. Fannie Ratchford, Rare Book Librarian at the University of Texas, took suspected copies in the Wrenn library to England, where she was able to help the museum check copies to see how many stolen leaves were to be found. Sixty of these books were also found to have been completed with thefts from the British Museum library.

A detailed scientific investigation by David Foxon was published by the Bibliographical Society in 1959 with the conclusion that Wise must have known that some of the book leaves added to his collection were stolen and that it was probable that he had taken the leaves himself; "In general it seems likely that Wise would not have risked sharing his guilty knowledge with an emissary but would have made the thefts himself; the rest of this study is written on that assumption."

A particularly noteworthy forgery, which he authenticated as genuine and original, was an edition of E. B. Browning's Sonnets from the Portuguese said to have been privately printed in Reading in 1847.

== Personal life ==
In 1890 Wise married Selina Fanny Smith (aged 22) and they moved into 52 Ashley Road, Hornsey Rise (leading to the name of the "Ashley Library"). By 1895 Selina deserted her husband on the grounds that he was fully devoted to his book collection rather than their marriage. In 1897 they were formally divorced and Wise moved to St George's Road in Kilburn, northwest London (now Priory Terrace).

Wise remarried in June 1900 to Frances Louise Greenhaigh and dedicated the final volume of the Ashley Library catalogue to her.

== Publications ==
Wise's published works included detailed bibliographies of Tennyson, Swinburne, Landor, Wordsworth, Coleridge, Ruskin, the Brownings, the Brontës, Shelley and Conrad. He was the copyright owner and co-editor of the Bonchurch edition of Swinburne's works.

== Legacy ==
The bulk of his personal papers — consisting of 33 document boxes (13.86 linear feet), and 2 galley folders — are at the Harry Ransom Center of The University of Texas at Austin. They are housed off site and require advance requests for examination. Another collection is at the Firestone Library at the Princeton University Library, Department of Rare Books and Special Collections. It includes 0.2 linear feet, 1 half-size archival box. (Note: "Consists of selected correspondence of Thomas James Wise, the English bibliographer and noted forger of the early 20th century.")
