= Bernhard Bischoff =

German philologist and palaeographer (1906–1991)

Bernhard Bischoff (20 December 1906 – 17 September 1991) was a German historian, paleographer, and philologist; he was born in Altendorf (administrative division of Altenburg, Thuringia), and he died in Munich.

== Biography ==
He was the son of Emil Bischoff and Charlotte von Gersdorff, who died giving birth to him. He received a Pietistic education during his youth. He married Hanne Oehler in 1935 and lived the majority of his life in Bavaria.

Before he earned his doctorate in 1933 under the direction of Paul Lehmann, he was recruited by the American paleographer E. A. Lowe as an assistant for the Codices Latini Antiquiores. He would work on this project until 1972, cataloging Latin manuscripts of the 9th century. It was in this context that young Bischoff deciphered and revealed in 1931 the name of the until then anonimous female author of St. Willibald's 8th-century biography, the Anglo-Saxon nun Hygeburg of Heidenheim.

From 1947 until his retirement in 1974, Bischoff held the chair for Medieval Latin Philology at LMU Munich. Here, he followed his mentor Lehmann, who himself had succeeded the chair's inaugural holder, Ludwig Traube.

In 1953, Bischoff was elected to the central board of directors of the Monumenta Germaniae Historica (MGH) and contributed to the Antiquitates series (primarily medieval poetry). In the later years of his life, he worked on cataloging nearly 7,000 9th-century medieval Latin manuscripts, published by the Bavarian Academy of Sciences.

Bischoff was most influential in the field of Latin paleography, specifically in his expertise in dating and localizing early medieval manuscripts. His main work on the subject, Latin Paleography: Antiquity and the Western Middle Ages, remains a standard work in the discipline. It has been translated into English by Dáibhí Ó Cróinín and David Ganz, and into French by Jean Vezin and Harmut Atsma. Bischoff received four degrees honoris causa at the University of Dublin in 1962, the University of Oxford in 1963, the University of Cambridge, and the University of Milan.

He was a member of the Bavarian Academy of Sciences in 1956, of the Royal Irish Academy in 1957, of the Medieval Academy of America in 1960, German Archeological Institute in 1962, the American Academy of Arts and Sciences in 1968, and the American Philosophical Society in 1989.

In 1982, he was awarded the gold medal of the Bibliographical Society. He gave a lecture on the occasion describing his early career and his experiences as a collaborator with E. A. Lowe on compiling the Codices Latini Antiquiores.

== Principal works ==
- The Southeast Writing Schools and Libraries in the Carolingian Era, Part I: The Bavarian Dioceses. Leipzig 1940 (Second edit.) Wiesbaden 1960 3rd edit. (Wiesbaden 1974); Part II: The Predominantly Austrian Dioceses, Wiesbaden 1980.
- Medieval Studies: Selected Articles on the Font Customer and Literary History, 3 Vols. Hiersemann, Stuttgart, 1966–1981.
- Catalogue of the Continental Manuscripts of the Ninth Century (with the exception of the Visigothic) & publications of the Commission for the Publication of the German and Swiss Medieval Library Catalogues, Part 1: Aachen – Lambach. (ISBN 3-447-03196-4).
- Catalogue of the Continental Manuscripts of the Ninth Century (with the exception of the Visigothic). Edition by Birgit Ebersperger (Publications of the Commission for the Publication of the German and Swiss Medieval Library Catalogues/ published by the Bavarian Academy of Sciences). Part 2. Laon – Manuscripts and libraries in the Age of Charlemagne, Tradition and Edit. by Paderborn. Harrassowitz, Wiesbaden 2004. (ISBN 3-447 -04750-X).
- Manuscripts and Libraries in the Age of Charlemagne, Tradition & Edition translated and edited by Michael Gorman (Cambridge Studies in Paleography and Codicology 1), Cambridge University Press: Cambridge 1994, (ISBN 0-521-38346-3) Recension.
- Paleography of Roman Antiquity and of the Western Middle Ages. 3rd Edition. Berlin 2004. (Basics of the German language and literature 24). (ISBN 3-503-07914-9).
