= Albert Bruckner =

Swiss historian, palaeographer and medievalist (1904-1985)

Albert Bruckner (13 July 1904, Basel – 10 December 1985, Finkenberg, aged 81) was a Swiss historian, palaeographer and medievalist.

Albert Bruckner, the son of a pastor of the same name, studied history in Basel, Lausanne, Berlin, Florence and Münster. After his doctorate in Cologne in 1929, he was an assistant in Berlin. In 1931 he returned to Basel. From 1933 to 1941 he was active at the Staatsarchiv Basel-Stadt, and from 1961 to 1966 he was head of the department. From 1948 onwards, Bruckner was an extraordinary professor of medieval history at the University of Basel. From 1966 until 1974, he was head of the Helvetia Sacra.

With Robert Marichal, Albert Bruckner is at the origin of the Chartae Latinae Antiquiores, a facsimile collection of documents written before 800, as a parallel company to the Codices Latini Antiquiores. After Bruckner's death, Robert Marichal was left single publishing director until 1994, when he was replaced by Hartmut Atsma and Jean Vezin.

== Works (selection) ==
- 1942: Schweizer Fahnenbuch. 2 vol., St. Gallen
- 1943: Schweizer Stempelschneider und Schriftgiesser. Geschichte des Stempelschnittes und Schriftgusses in Basel und der übrigen Schweiz von ihren Anfängen bis zur Gegenwart. Basel
- 1951: (with Edgar Bonjour) Basel und die Eidgenossen. Geschichte ihrer Beziehungen zur Erinnerung an Basels Eintritt in den Schweizerbund 1501. Basel.
- 1956: Die Zunft zu Brotbecken in Basel. Zur Siebenhundertjahrfeier ihrer Erwähnung. Basel.
