= Ludwig Traube =

Ludwig Traube may refer to:

- Ludwig Traube (physician) (1818–1876), German physician and co-founder of experimental pathology in Germany
- Ludwig Traube (palaeographer) (1861–1907), his son, German paleographer
