= Franz Boll =

Franz Boll may refer to:

- Franz Boll (historian) (1805–1875), German Lutheran theologian and historian
- Franz Boll (philologist) (1867–1924), German scholar
- Franz Christian Boll (1849–1879), German physiologist and histologist
