= E. A. Lowe Lectures =

The Triennial E. A. Lowe Lectures are an ongoing series of lectures held at Corpus Christi College, University of Oxford, in memory of the noted palaeographer E. A. Lowe who was an Honorary Fellow of the College from 1954 until his death in 1969. They are delivered by prominent palaeographers, with each scholar giving a trio of lectures on a topic within the field. Oxford University Press sometimes publishes revised versions of the lectures. Lecturers have included N. G. Wilson, A. C. de la Mare, Anthony Grafton, and Michael Lapidge.

== Lectures ==
- 2023 — Niels Gaul: Manuscripts of Character: Codex, Ethos, and Authority in Byzantium and Beyond
  - Lecture 1 (28 Feb 2023): “Codex” – explored the phenomenon of Byzantine literati curating their own writings in codex format and possible ancient and patristic models; with glances at similar practices in other medieval manuscript cultures
  - Lecture 2 (2 Mar 2023): “Ethos” – examined the ways in which such codices were thought to display the author's character, and what the concept entailed in this context
  - Lecture 3 (7 Mar 2023): “Authority” – related expressions of authorial ethos to matters of mise-en-page, with particular attention to marginal spaces
- 2020 — Judith Schlanger: The Hebrew-Latin Manuscripts of the Library of Corpus Christi College
  - Lecture 1 (25 Feb 2020): “Two nations in their mother's womb” – Hebrew-Latin manuscripts, their materiality and their purpose
  - Lecture 2 (27 Feb 2020): “Take the garment of a Jew” – bilingual manuscripts, their glosses and their Jewish background
  - Lecture 3 (3 Mar 2020): From “superscriptio Lincolniensis” to Prior Gregory – the difficult question of manuscripts’ provenance
- 2017 — Rodney Thomson: The Fox and the Bees: the First Century of the Library of Corpus Christi College
  - Lecture 1 (22 Feb 2017): The Founder as Shaping Force: Richard Fox and his Books
  - Lecture 2 (24 Feb 2017): The First President as Fox's Instrument: John Claymond’s Donations
  - Lecture 3 (27 Feb 2017): The Library They Produced
- 2014 — Erik Kwakkel: The Birth of Gothic Script
  - Lecture 1 (21 Feb 2014): The Evolution from Caroline Minuscule to Gothic Textualis
  - Lecture 2 (25 Feb 2014): Regional Variety
  - Lecture 3 (27 Feb 2014): Adopting a New Script
- 2011 — David Ganz: Latin Manuscript Books Prior to the Ninth Century: Ways of Using Codices Latini Antiquiores
  - Lecture 1 (9 May 2011): Evaluating the Evidence
  - Lecture 2 (16 May 2011): Scribes and their Patrons
  - Lecture 3 (23 May 2011): Half-Uncial Scripts
- 2008 — Susan Rankin: Impressed on the Memory: Musical Sounds and Notations in the Ninth Century
  - Lecture 1 (26 Feb 2008): Case Study One: The Abbey of St Gall
  - Lecture 2 (28 Feb 2008): Case Study Two: The Cathedral of Laon
  - Lecture 3 (6 Mar 2008): Musical Notation as a Carolingian Phenomenon
- 2005 — Virginia Brown: Beneventan Script and the Culture of Medieval Southern Italy
  - Lecture 1 (22 Feb 2005): E.A. Lowe and the Making of The Beneventan Script
  - Lecture 2 (24 Feb 2005): In the Shadow of Montecassino: Beneventan Writing Centres in the Abruzzi
  - Lecture 3 (1 Mar 2005): Across the Adriatic: Beneventan Scriptoria in Dalmatia
- 2002 — Michael Lapidge: The Anglo-Saxon Library
  - Lecture 1 (24 Jan 2002): Vanished Libraries
  - Lecture 2 (31 Jan 2002): Reconstructing Anglo-Saxon Libraries: The Evidence of Manuscripts
  - Lecture 3 (7 Feb 2002): Reconstructing Anglo-Saxon Libraries: The Evidence of Citations
- 1999 — Michael Reeve: Manuscripts and Method: The Transmission of Vegetius
  - Lecture 1 (25 Jan 1999): A Proposal about Modestus
  - Lecture 2 (1 Feb 1999): A Man on a Horse
  - Lecture 3 (8 Feb 1999): R.
- 1996 — Anthony Grafton: Ancient History in Early Modern Europe
  - Lecture 1 (24 Jan 1996): The Reading and Teaching of the Ancient Historians
  - Lecture 2 (26 Jan 1996): The Antiquarians and the Reconstruction of Ancient Societies
  - Lecture 3 (29 Jan 1996): The Rediscovery of Barbarian Texts and Civilisations

== See also ==
- Lyell Lectures
- McKenzie Lectures
- Panizzi Lectures
- Sandars Lectures
