= David Ganz =

David Ganz may refer to:

- David Ganz (palaeographer) (born 1952), British academic
- David Ganz (art historian) (born 1970), German academic
- David Gans (1541–1613), Renaissance Jewish historian and astronomer
- David Gans (musician) (born 1953), the musician
