= Parce Domine =

Lenten hymn

Parce Domine is a Roman Catholic antiphon sung especially during the Lenten season.

== Source ==
The text is derived from Joel 2:17. Early sacramentaries record a variety of prayers inspired by this quote from the prophet Joel, the variant ending to the prayer Parce, domine, parce ... having in common these three first words.

Parce, Domine was copied and adapted into local liturgies, and served as a model for the Irish prayer of Saint Mugint, which was allegedly composed in the 6th century by Finnian of Movilla as imitation of the Roman antiphon. It is found in a 9th-century manuscript of a learned Irish monk possibly at the court of King Æthelstan. To the initial Parce, Domine, parce populo tuo is appended in a different handwriting : Parce domine peccantibus, ignosce penitentibus, misere nobis te suggesting a strong link to Lent as the liturgical season of conversion for penitents. It occurs in the Breviary of Sarum and also in the Breviary of Aberdeen after the seven penitential psalms.

== Liturgical use ==
Parce Domine is a Lenten lament. The first half of the text comes from one of the responsories designated to be sung by the choir during the imposition of the ashes on Ash Wednesday. It has been prescribed universally for the Latin Church by the Missale Romanum of Pope Pius V since 1596 as the hymn to be sung during the imposition of the ashes which was to be done before the celebration of the Holy Mass on Ash Wednesday.

The 1961 Liber Usualis lists Parce Domine is an antiphon to be sung "at a time of penance."

In a final plea for conversion, Parce Domine was also sung during executions of criminals before the Miserere.

After the Restoration, Father J. Marbeuf composed a canticle entitled Parce Domine which was used in particular for the blessing of the Blessed Sacrament during Lent. This canticle is composed of seven verses which each include the evocation of a disorder of the world, of France, of society or of the troubles caused by infidel Christians; it was a sort of catharsis where all the sins were brought to light. The sinners then asked Christ for his forgiveness, declared their love to him and asked him to forget their faults.

Parce Domine was a popular hymn in the parish through the 20th century.

Along O, Roma nobilis, it was chosen as one of the hymns of the 1950 Jubilee decreed by Pope Pius XII, and was meant to insist on the penitential dimension of that Holy year after the Second World War.

== Text ==
Latin text	English translation
Parce, Domine, parce populo tuo: ne in aeternum irascaris nobis.	Spare, Lord, spare your people: Be not angry with us forever.

Latin	parce	Domine	parce	populo	tuo	ne	in	aeternum	irascaris	nobis
Grammar	Verb/Imp/Sing	Noun/Voc/Sing	Verb/Imp/Sing					adv/acc aeternus	2nd/sing/pres/act/subj irascor	
English literal	spare	Lord	spare	people	your			everlasting	angry	our/ours/us
English translation	Spare, Lord, spare your people: Be not angry with us forever									

== Music ==
The Gregorian melody to which Parce, Domine was set served as a basis for rich musical developments. The Gregorian Parce Domine refrain is also sung with verses from the miserere using the tonus peregrinus.

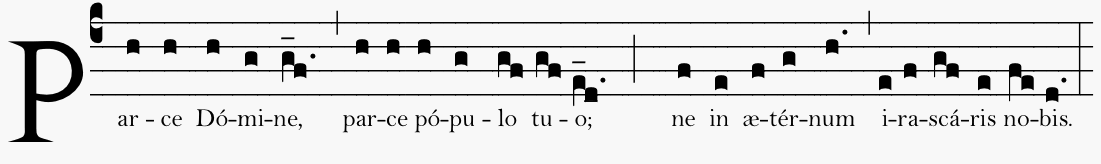

Jacob Obrecht composed an evocative motet, with challenging soprano and alto lines but a simple cantus firmus in half notes for the baritones, based on Parce Domine in 1547 in Basel, with the characteristic Flemish use of free contrapuntal lines with occasional suggestions of imitation. It is an illustration of the Aeolian mode in the Dedokachordon compiled by Heinrich Glarean, an important sixteenth century theoretical work in which the traditional system of eight modes is extended to twelve. The complexity of its polyphony has been traced back to a symbolising method of composition based on cabbalistic and mathematical principles.

Using the source text of Parce Domine, Thomas Tallis and his pupil William Byrd composed In Jejunio et Fletu in 1575, as part of a publication of Cantiones Sacrae, a large collection of sacred motets: he treats the original text with great freedom, piling on the emotion with repetitions of 'parce populo tuo'.

Claire Delbos wrote and published the last work of her life in 1952 — that is, contemporaneous with Messiaen's "Hands of the Abyss" — a piece for organ solo entitled Parce, Domine for the season of Lent.

== Popular culture ==
As a locus terribilis of Ash Wednesday, Parce Domine entered popular piety as a desperate cry to God in a plea for conversion. It is found in such a construction in a sonnet by Paul Verlaine.

Adolphe Willette painted a canvas entitled Parce Domine in 1884, which appears to be his masterpiece.

The name was also picked as an episode title by the Westworld television series "Parce Domine", directly inspired by Willette's painting.
