= Robert Marichal =

French palaeographer and archivist (1904-1999)

- Born: 20 March 1904; Mandres-les-Roses
- Died: 23 October 1999 (aged 95); Quincy-sous-Sénart (Essonne)
- Occupations: Palaeographer; Archivist.

Robert Marichal (20 March 1904 – 23 October 1999) was a French palaeographer and archivist.

== Career ==
A student at the École Nationale des Chartes, Robert Marichal obtained his archivist palaeographer degree in 1927 with a thesis entitled Les traductions provençales du Livre de Sidrach, précédées d'un classement des manuscrits français. He was then a curator at the Archives nationales from 1929 to 1949.

Professor of French language and literature from the Middle Ages at the faculty of letters of the Institut catholique de Paris (1930-1974), he was a POW between 1940 and 1945, assigned to the Egyptian Museum of Berlin where he studied the papyrus collection.

From 1949 until 1974, he was director of Latin and French palaeography studies at the École pratique des hautes études, where he succeeded Charles Samaran. From 1959 to 1985, he was professor of history of languages and scripts at the École de bibliothécaires-documentalistes of the Institut catholique de Paris, of which he was director from 1965 to 1985. Robert Marichal was also president of the IVe section (Section of Historical and Philological Sciences) of the École pratique des hautes études (1969-1974).

== Works ==
- Alongside Charles Samaran, Robert Marichal was one of the main architects of the founding of the International Committee for Latin Palaeography
- Robert Marichal and Albert Bruckner published the first twelve volumes of the Chartae latinae antiquiores (ChLA). Robert Marichal was left single publishing director after the death of Albert Bruckner, occurred December 10, 1985, and until 1994, when he was replaced by Hartmut Atsma and Jean Vezin.

=== Romance studies ===
- 1935: François Rabelais, Pantagruel, Lyon (introduction by Abel Lefranc).
- 1937: Le Théâtre en France au Moyen Age. Textes choisis. I. Drames liturgiques et théâtre religieux du XIIe et XIIIe siècle, Paris.
- 1947: François Rabelais, Le quart Livre, Lille/Genf, Droz.
- 1956: Marguerite de Navarre, La Navire, ou Consolation du roi François Ier à sa soeur Marguerite, Paris, Éditions Champion.
- 1971: Marguerite de Navarre, La coche, Genf/Paris, Droz/Minard.

=== Old philology and history ===
- 1946: L'Occupation romaine de la Basse-Egypte. Le statut des "auxilia", Paris, Droz, (Emerged from his work in the Egyptian Museum Berlin in German captivity).
- 1954–1998: with Albert Bruckner) Chartae latinae antiquiores. Facsimile-edition of the latin charters prior to the ninth century, 49 Bde., Olten/Lausanne, Urs Graf Verlag, (with collaborators from volume 13).
- 1959–1985: (with Charles Samaran) Catalogue des manuscrits en écriture latine portant des indications de date, de lieu ou de copiste, 7 Bde., Paris, Centre national de la recherche scientifique.
- 1987: Le Livre des prieurs de Sorbonne 1431-1485. Texte critique, Paris, Aux amateurs de livres.
- 1988: Les Graffites de La Graufesenque, Paris, Éditions du Centre national de la recherche scientifique.
- 1992: Les ostraca de Bu Njem, Tripoli, Département des antiquités, Assraya al hamra / Paris, Boccard.
