= Disputatio puerorum =

Start of the Disputatio in the earliest manuscript

The Disputatio puerorum is a Latin catechism in question-and-answer format. Written in the early 9th century, it may have been intended as a schoolbook for novices and oblates or as a handbook for rural priests.

== Authorship and readership ==
The Disputatio is anonymous in the manuscripts, where it was often copied alongside the works of Alcuin of York. This led its first editor, Frobenius Forster, to attribute it to Alcuin in 1777. This attribution became traditional. Its most recent editors reject it, arguing that the text was probably composed in Bavaria, either at Regensburg or Salzburg. Joseph Pucci accepts it as probably authentic, while Donald Bullough and Lukas Dorfbauer attribute it to Alcuin's circle. Its author may be known for convenience as Pseudo-Alcuin.

In the latest edition of the text, the editors argue for the Disputatio as a schoolbook for novices and oblates. They situate it in the context of the Carolingian Renaissance, with its emphasis on church reform and education. David Ganz suggests that it may have been a handbook for rural priests. Rutger Kramer, on the basis of the quality of the earliest known manuscript and its signs of limited use, that it may have been produced for an aristocrat or an ecclesiastic of higher rank.

== Contents ==
The Disputatio is divided into nine chapters:

1. De operibus sex dierum – on the six days of creation
2. De natura hominis – on human nature
3. De sex aetatibus mundi – on the six ages of the world
4. De ratione temporum – on the reckoning of time
5. De veteri testamento – on the Old Testament
6. De novo testamento – on the New Testament
7. De gradibus totius ecclesiae dignitatis – on ecclesiastical hierarchy
8. De fide – on faith
9. De Dominica oratione – on the Lord's Prayer

Under human nature, the issues of the imago Dei, the soul and the senses are treated. There are long discussions of thee meaning of spiritus (spirit) and the names of God (of which ten are listed). The name of each book of the bible is explained and the book summarized. Under faith, there is a discussion of the Apostles' Creed. Under ecclesiastical hierarchy, there is a discussion of liturgy.

The Disputatio largely distills information from existing authorities, the most used of which by far are Isidore of Seville's De natura rerum and De ecclesiasticis officiis. Isidore's Etymologies is also used to supply definitions. Other authorities include Augustine of Hippo, Gregory the Great, Bede and the anonymous treatise De traditione symboli. Chapter 2 relies heavily on the Dicta Albini de imagine dei. One passage is derived from Alcuin's De orthographia, which is the latest work cited.

== Manuscripts ==
Start of the Disputatio in an 10th-century manuscript. The title is in red ink above the red initial E.

The critical edition by Andrew Rabin and Liam Felsen is based on six complete or partial manuscript copies. The title, Disputatio puerorum, is taken from the base manuscript, Vienna, Österreichische Nationalbibliothek, 458, which was copied for Baldo of Salzburg in the second quarter of the 9th century. The known complete manuscripts are:

- Munich, Bayerische Staatsbibliothek, Clm 6385 (late 10th century)
- Saint Petersburg, Publichnaja Biblioteka, O.v.I.7, copied at Salzburg
- Vienna, Österreichische Nationalbibliothek, 458 (9th century), copied at Salzburg

Fragments or excerpts are found in:

- Düsseldorf, Universitätsund Landesbibliothek, B. 113 II (9th century)
- Ghent, Universiteitsbibliotheek, 324 (9th century), copied in Mainz or Trier
- Munich, Bayerische Staatsbibliothek, Clm 5257 (9th century)
- Munich, Bayerische Staatsbibliothek, Clm 14508 (9th century), copied at Saint Emmeram's Abbey, Regensburg
- Munich, Bayerische Staatsbibliothek, Clm 14510, copied at Saint Emmeram's
- Orléans, Médiathèque, 116 (9th century), copied at Fleury Abbey
- Paris, Bibliothèque nationale de France, lat. 1535 (9th century)
- Sankt Gallen, Stiftsbibliothek, 40 (9th century)
- Sankt Gallen, Stiftsbibliothek, 732 (9th century), probably copied in Freising
- Sélestat, Bibliothèque municipale, 132 (9th century), copied at Mainz
- Troyes, Médiathèque du Grand Troyes, Fonds ancien 1979 (11th century)
- Toronto, University of Toronto, Thomas Fisher Rare Book Library, MS 45, fragments 24-25
- Vienna, Österreichische Nationalbibliothek, 966 (9th century)
- Vienna, Österreichische Nationalbibliothek, 1370 (9th century), copied at Mondsee Abbey
- Weimar, Herzogin-Anna-Amalia-Bibliothek. 4o 39 I (11th century)
- Zürich, Zentralbibliothek, Rheinau 104 (9th century)

Ganz notes that the large number of excerpts found in manuscripts may indicate that the Disputatio is a composite text with certain passages or even chapters existing independently before being brought together.

== Bibliography ==
- Bruce, Scott G. (2017). "Review of Rabin & Felsen 2017". Mediaevistik. 30: 387–388. JSTOR 45112751.
- Bullough, Donald (2004). Alcuin: Achievement and Reputation. Brill.
- Dorfbauer, Lukas (2022). "Überlieferung, Textkonstitution und Autorschaft der Alkuin zugeschriebenen Disputatio puerorum (ALC 42)". Filologia mediolatina: Rivista della Fondazione Ezio Franceschini. 29: 47–112.
- Felsen, Liam Ethan (2003). Disputatio puerorum: Analysis and Critical Edition (PhD dissertation). University of Oregon.
- Ganz, David (2018). "Review of Rabin & Felsen 2017". Francia-Recensio (3). doi:10.11588/frrec.2018.3.51776.
- Keefe, Susan (2012). A Catalogue of Works Pertaining to the Explanation of the Creed in Carolingian Manuscripts. Brepols.
- Kramer, Rutger (2019). "Review of Rabin & Felsen 2017". Speculum. 94 (4): 1209–1210. doi:10.1086/704905.
- Major, Tristan (2020). "Editions of Texts for Teaching Medieval Latin". The Journal of Medieval Latin. 30 (1): 399–410. doi:10.1484/J.JML.5.119948.
- Maloney, Cornelius Leo, ed. (1943). The Disputatio Puerorum per Interrogationes et Responses of Alcuin. Catholic University of America Press.
- Palmer, Nigel F. (2018). "Review of Rabin & Felsen 2017". Medium Aevum. 87 (1): 196–197.
- Pucci, Joseph, ed. (2024). The Poetry of Alcuin of York: A Translation with Introduction and Commentary. Routledge.
- Rabin, Andrew; Felsen, Liam, eds. (2017). The Disputatio puerorum: A Ninth-Century Monastic Instructional Text. Pontifical Institute of Mediaeval Studies.
