= When in Rome (1952 film) =

1952 film by Clarence Brown

- Directed by: Clarence Brown
- Written by: Robert Buckner; Dorothy Kingsley; Charles Schnee
- Produced by: Clarence Brown
- Starring: Van Johnson; Paul Douglas; Joseph Calleia
- Cinematography: William H. Daniels
- Edited by: Robert Kern
- Music by: Carmen Dragon
- Distributed by: Metro-Goldwyn-Mayer
- Release date: May 11, 1952
- Running time: 78 minutes
- Country: United States
- Language: English
- Budget: $1,313,000
- Box office: $683,000

When in Rome is a 1952 American comedy drama film directed by Clarence Brown and starring Van Johnson, Paul Douglas, and Joseph Calleia. The film was released by Metro-Goldwyn-Mayer, and was based on a story by Robert Buckner, Dorothy Kingsley, and Charles Schnee. The picture opens with the following text: ”1950 was a Holy Year. Three million pilgrims from every part of the world thronged to Rome, the Eternal City. Our story is about two men who journeyed to Rome that year. One was Father John X. Halligan, a young priest from Coaltown, Pennsylvania, whose mission was a holy one. The other was Joe Brewster, late of Sing Sing, San Quentin, Joliet and Atlanta, whose mission was not so holy. If our story has a moral, it’s a simple one. God may move in mysterious ways, but He gets there just the same.”

== Plot ==
Father John X. Halligan is a Catholic priest visiting Rome for the 1950 Holy Year. On the long voyage from New York City to Genoa, he makes friends with Joe Brewster, his cabin mate. Unknown to Halligan, Brewster is a career criminal wanted by American authorities; he faces a life sentence.

The ship docks in Genoa. When he sees police waiting, Brewster steals Halligan's clothing, cassock, hat and passport in order to evade arrest. Two priests appear to welcome “Father Halligan”. When Halligan disembarks, wearing Brewster’s flamboyant clothes, he is arrested. The Genoa commissario of police believes his story when he chants a portion of the mass.

Meanwhile, Brewster makes friends with an Irish priest and ends up staying with him in Rome at the Monastery of the Three Saints. At a concert, he remembers his days as a choir boy.

Now dressed in borrowed clothes, Halligan reluctantly promises to aid the police. In Rome, he meets the cynical commissario of police. On the way to headquarters, they stop for a procession. Halligan sees Brewster in it and says nothing. The commissario tells Halligan that he will meet him the next morning at the Monastery of the Three Angels, where he is registered. Halligan, who has no place to stay, realizes that this must be Brewster and finds him there. Brewster asks for just one day. Halligan agrees—and prays for guidance. Once he is gone, Brewster follows suit.

The detective shadowing Halligan for his protection invites him home to supper, but they hear sirens. The Monastery of the Three Saints is on fire. Halligan runs back to rescue Brewster, who is fine. A beam falls, and he rescues Father Halligan. They clean up in the fountain of Trevi, then go to the deserted Coliseum, where Halligan asks why Brewster needs the whole day. Brewster wants to earn the total indulgence proclaimed by the pope for the 1950 Holy Year. He starts by making his first confession in 20 years to Halligan. The two then make their way to the sites, with Halligan —and the audience—learning more and more about Brewster.

Halligan is still debating what to do when police see them. He helps Brewster evade arrest by ducking through an ancient door into a cloister where monks are working in the garden. In this religious order, the men remain enclosed for life and never talk to anyone except a superior. They are atoning for their sins and the sins of the world. Brewster finds himself drawn to the place during his brief visit: "Where I was, you could feel the hate in the air, but here..." As they leave, the abbot writes a note apologizing for everyone staring at them, but the iron latch that opened so easily for them has been corroded shut for 100 years.

Halligan and Brewster head to the train station while the streets fill with police. Once there, they become separated, and the commissario finds Halligan. When he insists that Brewster is on a pilgrimage, the commissario goes to St. Peters, where they take him into custody and send him off in a van. Halligan, miserable at having inadvertently betrayed his friend, is convinced that the man is reformed: Then the news comes that Brewster has escaped, which leaves Halligan unsure of himself and his judgment.

Retracing his steps, Halligan returns to the monastery. To his surprise, Brewster is there, wearing monk’s robes. He asks the abbot: Did Brewster tell him his whole story? Is he a worthy penitent? The abbot nods. Brewster writes to Halligan: Prison was all past and no future, and this place is all future and no past. He asks when the next Holy Year will be. Halligan answers that it will be in 25 years, and he promises to visit then. A bell sounds, and they shake hands. Brewster steps back into the cloister and bolts the gate. Father Halligan strides down the hill to join the throngs walking toward the heart of the city.

== Cast ==
- Van Johnson as Father John X. Halligan
- Paul Douglas as Joe Brewster
- Joseph Calleia as Aggiunto Bodulli, Commissario of Police in Rome
- Carlo Rizzo as Antonio Silesto
- Tudor Owen as Father McGinniss
- Dino Nardi as Commissario Genoa
- Aldo Silvaro as Cabby
- Mario Siletti as Luigi Lugucetti
- Emory Parnell as Ship's Captain

== Reception ==
According to MGM records, the film made $503,000 in the U.S. and Canada and $180,000 in other markets, resulting in a loss of $918,000.
