= Dubrovnik Missal =

12th-century text from Croatia

The Dubrovnik Missal (Croatian: Dubrovački misal, Latin: Missale Ragusinum) is a 12th-century Croatian missal written in Dubrovnik.

It was used on the holy masses celebrated in the Dubrovnik Cathedral. It is written by beneventan script and notation, and is best example of beneventan chant in southern Dalmatia and is a Zero Category Monument (the highest category of protection).

Missal contains 230 prayers and 230 songs that can be compared with the most beautiful pieces of the world heritage. The tunes that can be found in the Missal are different. Some are identical to other European songs of the time, some are varieties of similar tunes, and some, like the exsultet, are completely different and are not found anywhere else in the world. It shows that Dubrovnik had a highly developed Gregorian music.

Missal disappeared from Dubrovnik under unknown circumstances and was eventually found at an auction in Venice in 1817. Namely, it was a part of the private book collection of the Venetian Jesuit Matteo Luigi Canonici. Today its kept in the Bodleian Library in Oxford, England. Elias Avery Lowe was the first scholar that asserted the Dubrovnik origin of Missal by noticing the mention of the saints and martyrs of Peter, Andrew and Lawrence, which are celebrated in Dubrovnik where they are known as Sveti Petilovrijenci.

Missal was found by Croatian musicologist Don Miho Demović about 40 years ago at the Bodleian Library. With the Library's permission, the reprint of Dubrovnik Missal was published in 2011 by the Dubrovnik Library, with the financial help of a retired Dubrovnik English language and litterateur professor Pavica Šper Šundrica.
