= Pseudo-Alcuin =

Pseudo-Alcuin is the name given to the various authors whose works have been misattributed to Alcuin of York or who forged works in his name, and by extension collectively to the works themselves. Several different categories of such works can be identified: those where the authorship is uncertain and attribution to Alcuin has been questioned, those certainly not by Alcuin but transmitted under his name as pseudepigrapha and those works misattributed to Alcuin by scholars in modern times.

== Spurious attributions ==
=== Pseudepigrapha ===
Those works definitely not by Alcuin but transmitted under his name include:

- Collectum ex sacra scriptura qualiter septies in die et semel in nocte domino laudes omnibus christianis oporteat referre, in the form of a letter
- Commentarium in Matthaeum
- Confessio fidei, possibly by John of Fécamp
- De appetitu virtutum, a patristic florilegium
- De astrologia
- De processione Spiritus sancti
- De septem sigillis, a commentary on Revelation
- Dicta Albini de imagine Dei, later combined with the non-Alcuinian Dicta Candidi under the title De dignitate conditionis humanae
- Distica Albini
- Doctrina in fide
- Dogmata Albini ad Carolum imperatorem
- Epistola ad Carolum Magnum de ortu Beneventanorum
- Expositio Missae "Dominus vobiscum"
- Expositio orationis dominicae
- Fuganda sunt omnimodis
- Glossae super quinque libros Moysi, glosses on the Pentateuch, at least one of which is actually by Haimo of Auxerre
- Igitur converso primum omnium dicere debemus, quando devota mente convertitur
- Item Flaccus dicit: vidimus ex Hebraeis virum elegantem et admirati eum sumus et amplexi
- Officia per ferias

In the published letters of Alcuin, numbers 132, 180, 299, 304 and 340a are spurious.

Some Alcuinian pseudepigrapha are well-known works or excerpts of works by identifiable authors:

- Commentarium in Platonis Timaeum, commentary on Plato's Timaeus, actually by Calcidius
- De arithmetica "Mathematica Latine", actually excerpted from Isidore of Seville's Etymologiae
- De grammatica, actually excerpted from Tatwine's Ars de partibus orationis
- De musica, actually excerpted from Aurelian of Réôme's Musica disciplina
- De partibus orationis, actually excerpted from Servius the Grammarian's Commentarius in Artem Donati
- De septem artibus, actually excerpted from Cassiodorus' Institutiones
- Prognosticon de futuro saeculo, actually Julian of Toledo
- Prologus in Vitam Caroli Magni Imperatoris, the prologue to Einhard's Vita Karoli Magni, actually written by Einhard
- Sermo ad Carolum Magnum in Hypapanti Domini, actually Ambrose Autpert's Sermo de lectione evangelica
- Sermo de assumptione sanctae Mariae, actually a paraphrase of a sermon by Ambrose Autpert
- Sermo de nativitate perpetuae Virginis Mariae, actually a paraphrase of a sermon by Ambrose Autpert
- Vita Antichristi ad Carolum Magnum ab Alcuino descripta, adapted from Adso of Montier-en-Der's De ortu et tempore Antichristi
- Vita Antichristi ad Carolum Magnum ab Alcuino edita, adapted from Adso of Montier-en-Der's De ortu et tempore Antichristi

A supplement to the Gregorian Sacramentary is sometimes attributed to Alcuin but was more probably by Benedict of Aniane.

=== Modern misattributions ===
Many misattributions arose in early modern times as scholars worked to identify and print Alcuin's writings. These include:

- Annales ut videtur Alcuini
- Compendium fidei contra Arianos, misidentified by Pierre-François Chifflet, actually the Breviarium contra haereticos of Caesarius of Arles
- De baptismi officio ac mysticis sensibus
- De divinis officiis
- De psalmorum usu liber
- De tribulationibus
- Disputatio puerorum
- Expositio in LXXV Psalmos, actually part of the Flores Psalmorum of Lietbert of Saint-Ruf
- Expositio Missae "Primum in Ordine"
- Expositio Missae "Quotiens contra se diversarum"
- Notitia ecclesiarum Urbis Romae
- Oratio matutinalis pro custodia diei sequentis
- Orationes ad Deum et Apostolos
- Ordo de catechizandis rudibus
- Scholia in Aviani fabulas
- Sermo de silentio, actually part of Hugh of Saint-Victor's De verbo incarnato
- Sermo in festo omnium sanctorum, attributed to many different authors in the manuscripts
- Textus librorum legum
- Tractatus de assumptione beatae Mariae virginis
- Versus biblici from the First Bible of Charles the Bald, some of which have been ascribed to Alcuin
- Vita sancti Iudoci

A number of poems published from two now lost manuscripts were misattributed to Alcuin by André Duchesne and Frobenius Forster. They are now known as the carmina apocrypha and can be attributed to Aileran, Aldhelm, Angilbert, Bede, Einhard, Eugenius of Toledo, Fardulf, Hrabanus Maurus, Paul the Deacon, Rusticius, Sedulius and Theodulf.

== Uncertain status ==
The following works are of uncertain authorship and may not be by Alcuin:

- Adhortatio ad imitandas virtutes sancti Vedasti in actis descriptas
- Comes Hieronymi
- De bissexto
- De conversorum acceptione opusculum
- De saltu lunae
- Dicta quibus ebdomade diebus quorum sanctorum memoria celebratur
- Interpretationes nominum Hebraicorum progenitorum Domini Nostri Iesu Christi
- Octo tonos in musica consistere
- Oratio ad personam Spiritus
- Oratio Domine Iesu Christe
- Prophetiae spiritus
- Propositiones ad acuendos iuvenes
- Ratio de cursu lunae

Of Alcuin's published songs (carmina), numbers civ (104) and cxiv (114) have been questioned, as has letter 100.
