= Baldo of Salzburg =

Baldo of Salzburg was a teacher (scholasticus) in the cathedral of Salzburg during the episcopate of Liupram (r. 836–859). He later served as chancellor of King Carloman of Bavaria (r. 876–879).

Baldo was a priest and a writer. His writings include theology, canon law, liturgy and poetry. He sent one religious treatise to King Louis the German (r. 840–876), who wrote a poem, Ad Baldonem, in response requesting clarification. Baldo also wrote a commentary on the Gothic alphabet. He copied excerpts from Ulfilas' Gothic Bible and translated them into Frankish.

Baldo had several Irish connections. The manuscript Vienna, Österreichische Nationalbibliothek, 458 (formerly Salzburg 174), containing Adomnán's De locis sanctis and the Disputatio puerorum, was copied for him. A distich on the flyleaf of reads: Hunc humilis librum fecit perscribere Baldo ('Baldo had this humble book copied'). A similar notice appears in Graz, Universitätsbibliothek, 790: Hunc humilis thomum Baldo craxare rogauit ('Baldo asked for this humble volume to be written'). It uses the distinctly Hiberno-Latin word craxare.

Baldo's hand has been detected in at least 40 manuscripts from Salzburg. In addition to the two already mentioned, there are:

- Kiel, Universitätsbibliothek, K.B.62
- Munich, Bayerische Staatsbibliothek, Clm 208, 14300, 15806, 15813, and 15821
- Paris, Bibliothèque nationale de France, Latin 2112
- Prague, Národní knihovna České republiky, III E 10
- St. Florian, Stiftsbibliothek, III. 222. B
- Salzburg, Stiftsarchiv, A 1
- Salzburg, Stiftsbibliothek Sankt Peter, a.V.38, a.VII.2, a.VIII.16, a.Ix.16, a.Ix.27, a.x.4, a.x.22, a.Ix.33, and a.xI.16
- Vatican City, Biblioteca Apostolica, Vat. lat. 7222
- Vienna, Österreichische Nationalbibliothek, 371, 387, 420, 489, 690, 765, 795, 808, 934, 940, 961, 964, 970, 992, 1007, 1224, 2195, and s.n. 3755
- Würzburg, Universitätsbibliothek, M.p.th.f.46

== Bibliography ==
- Bieler, Ludwig (1958). "The Text Tradition". In Denis Meehan (ed.). Adamnan's De Locis Sanctis. Dublin Institute for Advanced Studies. pp. 30–34.
- Felsen, Liam Ethan (2003). Disputatio puerorum: Analysis and Critical Edition (PhD dissertation). University of Oregon.
- Goldberg, Eric J. (2006). Struggle for Empire: Kingship and Conflict under Louis the German, 817–876. Cornell University Press.
- O'Loughlin, Thomas (1997). "The Salzburg Fragment of Adomnán's De locis sanctis". Manuscripta. 41 (1): 32–37. doi:10.1484/j.mss.3.1518.
- Reynolds, Roger E. (2009). "The Notitia Galliarum: An Unusual Bavarian Version". In Martin Brett; Kathleen G. Cushing (eds.). Readers, Texts and Compilers in the Earlier Middle Ages: Studies in Medieval Canon Law in Honour of Linda Fowler-Magerl. Routledge. pp. 3–14.
- Warnes, Julia (2020). Dúngal: A Study of his Life and Works (PhD dissertation). University of Toronto.
