= Distica Albini =

Page from the Distica

The Distica Albini are a set of 31 hexametrical couplets with an introductory poem of six hexameters and a closing poem of eighteen. They are found under the rubric Distica eiusdem ad eundem regem on folios 379v–381r in the manuscript Cambridge University Library, Gg V 35, the same manuscript that contains the Cambridge Songs. The incipit is O praesul patriae prudens et rex venerande. Although the scribe of the manuscript attributed them to Alcuin of York, they are not in fact by him but by an anonymous author of the 9th century. The manuscript contains other Pseudo-Alcuiniana. The rubric implies that they were dedicated to Charlemagne. It is more likely that they were addressed to his successor, Louis the Pious.

Wilhelm Meyer edited the Distica and provided a commentary. Meyer believed the poems were probably written by Smaragdus of Saint-Mihiel.

== Bibliography ==
- Doane, A. N. (2001). "Cambridge, University Library Gg. 5. 35: Collection of Classical, Early Christian, Carolingian, and Medieval Verse; Cambridge Songs Manuscript". Anglo-Saxon Manuscripts in Microfiche Facsimile. 9: 1–31.
- Meyer, Wilhelm (1907). "Smaragd's Mahnbüchlein für einen Karolinger". Nachrichten von der Königlichen Gesellschaft der Wissenschaften zu Göttingen: Philologish-historische Klasse: 39–74.
- Pucci, Joseph, ed. (2024). The Poetry of Alcuin of York: A Translation with Introduction and Commentary. Routledge.
- Rigg, Arthur G.; Wieland, Gernot R. (1975). "A Canterbury Classbook of the Mid-Eleventh Century (The 'Cambridge Songs' Manuscript)". Anglo-Saxon England. 4: 113–130.
