= Margarete Traube =

German-Italian chemist and activist

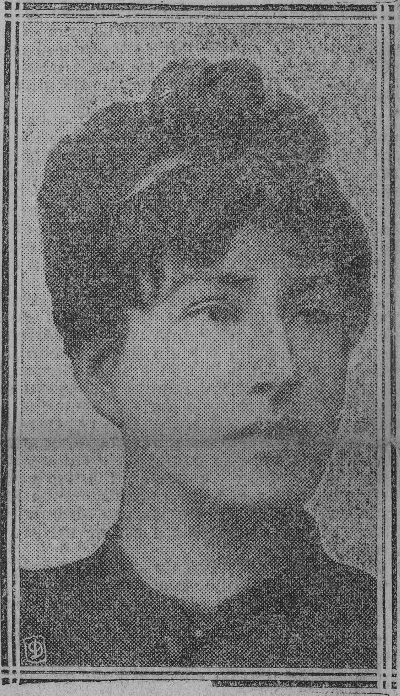
- Margherita Traube Mengarini, in La Tribuna, 11 December 1912.
- Born: 4 June 1856; Berlin, Germany
- Died: 11 December 1912 (aged 56); Anzio, Italy
- Other name: Margarete Traube Mengarini
- Occupations: Chemist and activist
- Spouse(s): Franz Christian Boll, Guglielmo Mengarini
- Children: four
- Father: Ludwig Traube (1818–1876)

Margarete Traube (also known as Margherita Traube Mengarini) (4 June 1856 – 11 December 1912) was a German-born chemist, salon holder, and early feminist who lived in Italy much of her adult life.

== Biography ==
Traube was born in Berlin, Germany into a Jewish family with a scientific tradition. Her father was Ludwig Traube (1818–1876), a famous doctor; her uncle was the chemical physiologist Moritz Traube (1826–1894); while her brother was a well known Middle-Latin philologist Ludwig Traube (1861–1907). She was the maternal aunt of Anna Fraentzel Celli, nurse and malarial researcher (1877–1958), wife of Professor Angelo Celli (3/14/1858–11/8/1915).

In 1876 both of her parents died. The following year, at age 21, she arrived in Rome, Italy, on a pleasure trip accompanied by the German writer and emancipationist Fanny Lewald.

In 1878 Traube decided to settle permanently in Italy, and enrolled at the University of Rome (later graduating with honors in natural sciences) where she became the favorite pupil of Dutch physiologist Jacob Moleschott, who had himself been a former student of her father's in Berlin.

=== Marriages ===
At the university, Traube reconnected with Franz Christian Boll, a physiologist who had also been one of her father's students. Boll had moved to Italy six years earlier to cure himself of pulmonary tuberculosis, and in 1873 he was named chair of anatomy and comparative physiology at the University of Rome.

On 12 March 1879, Traub and Boll married, but he died only 10 months later, on 19 December. Widowed, Traub dedicated herself to the care and posthumous publication of her husband's works in Italian and German.

Later, she met the Italian engineer, and eventual professor, Guglielmo Mengarini and they were wed 18 August 1884 in Zurich, Switzerland. They went on to have four children: Publio (1885–1949), an economist; Cora, who died in 1886 as an infant; Valeria (1889–1938); and Fausta (1893–1952), a sculptor.

Traube and Mengarini traveled often between their home in central Rome, the Palazzo Mengarini and their villa in Porto d'Anzio.

Continuing the tradition of salons held by her parents in Germany (where she had first met her first husband Franz Boll), Traube hosted exclusive Roman cultural salons that explored feminism and humanism, and influenced Italian culture of the time. Attendees included well known personalities of the time such as Theodor Mommsen, Emanuel Löwy, Pietro Blaserna, Adolf Furtwängler, as well as her brother Ludwig Traube.

=== Research ===
As a university student of Jacob Moleschott, Traube carried out her first research work in the laboratory of the physiologist Emil Du Bois-Reymond (where she was forced to sit behind a curtain). Later she worked in the chemical laboratory of Stefano Capranica, who had studied with her first husband, Boll. She continued her studies of animal physiology collaborating with the physicist Pietro Blaserna and then working in the laboratory of Casimiro Manassei, where she conducted research on skin permeability.

She was also known to collaborate with Luigi Luciani and with Angelo Celli and his Institute of Hygiene. With her colleague Alberto Scala, she was lead author on several published papers describing their research on the chemistry of colloids and metal alloys.

At the end of her life, from 1911 on, she was working in Emanuele Paternò's chemistry laboratory.

In addition to her scientific production, Traube was also a multifaceted author, contributing numerous essays on many topics of philosophy, society and geography, but no printed copies are known to exist today.

=== Final years ===
In 1912, sick with cancer, Traube traveled to Milan for a few months of experimental treatment by the Italian pathologist and hygienist Francesco Sanfelice. Even though she was ill, while in Milan, Traube continued her research using the laboratory of Ettore Molinari.

Returning to her home in Anzio, apparently cured, she contracted a severe case of the flu and suddenly died there on 11 December 1912 at age 56.

== Selected publications ==
- Experimentelle Beiträge zur Physiologie des Fischgehirns, in "Archiv für Anatomie und Physiologie," 1884.
- Research on the gases contained in the swim bladder of fish, in " Accademia dei Lincei," 1888.
- The education of our children, in "New Anthology," 1898.
- On the conjugation of amoebas, in "Rendiconti della R. Accademia dei Lincei," 1903.
- Ludwig Traube, in "Nomina Sacra." (1907). Print.
- (with Alberto Scala), Ueber die chemische Durchlässigkeit lebender Algen- und Protozoenzellen für anorganische Salze und die spezifische Wirkung letzterer, in " Biochemische Zeitschrift," 1909.
- (with Alberto Scala), Solution of metals in the colloidal state obtained by the action of boiling distilled water, in "Proceedings of the Italian Society for the Progress of Sciences," 1910.
