= Ernst Boll =

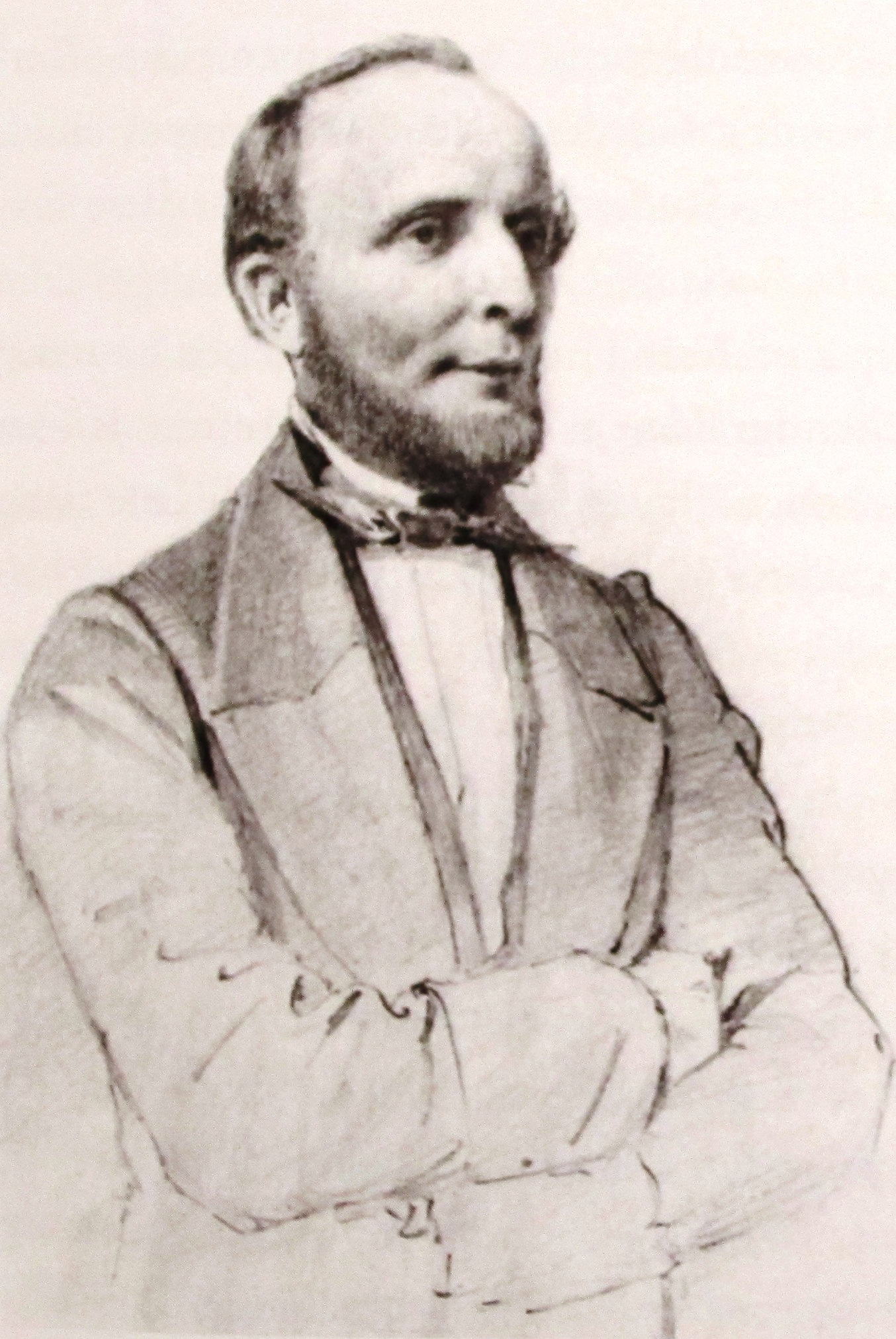
Ernst Boll (1863)

Ernst Friedrich August Boll (21 September 1817, Neubrandenburg – 20 January 1868) was a German naturalist and historian. He was a brother to historian Franz Boll (1805–1875), with whom he worked on numerous projects. Ernst Boll is remembered for his extensive research involving the natural history of Mecklenburg.

He studied theology and sciences in Bonn and Berlin, and following graduation in 1842, became a private tutor in the town of Friedland. In 1846 he was a founding member of Vereins der Freunde der Naturgeschichte Mecklenburg (Association of Friends of Natural History of Mecklenburg), and he was editor of the group's archives from 1847 until his death in 1868. In this position he penned many scientific articles on geology, petrography, zoology and botany. One of his more important writings was a treatise concerning history of the Mecklenburg region titled Die Geschichte Mecklenburgs, mit besonderer Berücksichtigung der Culturgeschichte.

Boll was politically active and a supporter of liberal issues. He was a prominent member of the 1848 Neubrandenburger Reformbewegung (Neubrandenburg Reform Movement), and through this confederation became a good friend to novelist Fritz Reuter (1810–1874). After his death in 1868, his large collection of rocks and fossils were donated to the Neubrandenburg Museum, and are now part of the Natural History Collection of Mecklenburg-Western Pomerania in Müritzeum, near the city of Waren.

Since 1992 the state of Mecklenburg-Western Pomerania has issued the Ernst-Boll-Umweltpreis (Ernst Boll Environment Prize).

== Selected publications ==
- Geognosie der deutschen Ostseeländer zwischen Eider und Oder (Geognosy of the German Baltic countries between the Eider and Oder Rivers), 1846
- Abriß der physischen Geographie (Summary of physical geography), 1850
- Die Insel Rügen (The Island of Rügen), 1858
- Flora von Mecklenburg (Flora of Mecklenburg), 1860
- Abriß der Mecklenburg (Summary of Mecklenburg), 1861
- Die Geschichte Mecklenburgs, mit besonderer Berücksichtigung der Culturgeschichte (The History of Mecklenburg, with particular attention to cultural history) 1855–1856, two volumes.
