= Franz Christian Boll =

German physiologist and histologist

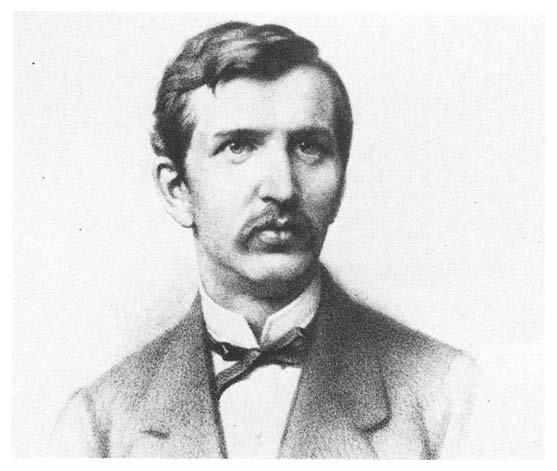
Franz Christian Boll.

Franz Boll (26 February 1849, Neubrandenburg – 19 December 1879, Rome) was a German physiologist and histologist. He was the son of Lutheran theologian Franz Boll (1805–1875).

Boll studied medicine in Bonn, Heidelberg and Berlin, and in 1870 worked at the physiological institute of Emil du Bois-Reymond (1818–1896) in Berlin. Later he became a professor at the University of Genoa, and from 1873 to 1879 was a professor of physiology in Rome. He died in Rome on 19 December 1879 at the age of 30.

Boll is remembered for the discovery of rhodopsin, when he noticed that the light-sensitive pigment in the rods of the retina had a tendency to fade in the presence of illumination. He also published his findings in a pamphlet titled Sull'anatomia e fisiologia della retina (1877).

His name is associated with the eponymous "Boll cells", being described as basal cells located in the lacrimal gland. As a student of Max Schultze (1825–1874) at Bonn, he was the author of a significant histological treatise on dental pulp called Untersuchungen über die Zahnpulpa.

He was married to the chemist and activist Margarete Traube, a daughter of the physician Ludwig Traube.
