= Ludwig Traube (physician) =

German physician (1818–1876)

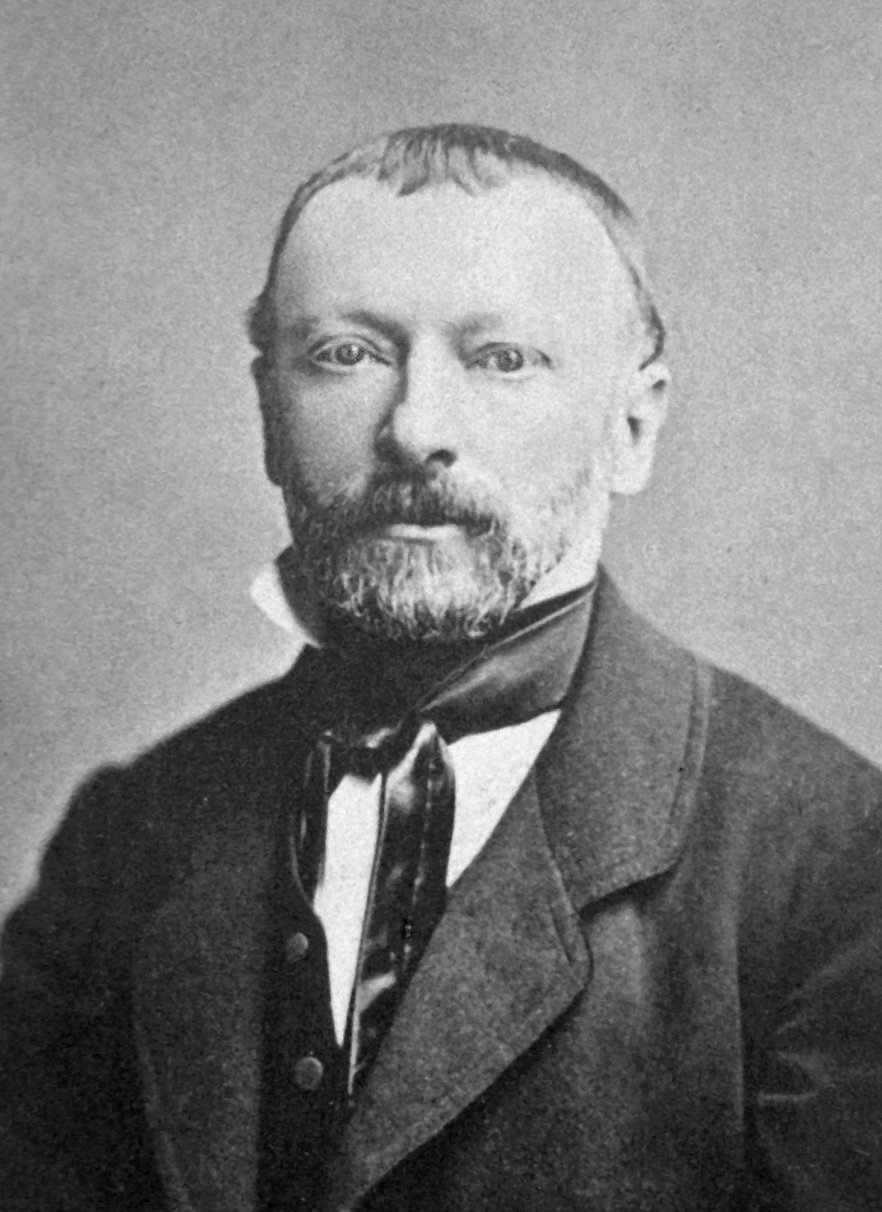
Ludwig Traube

Ludwig Traube (12 January 1818 in Ratibor, Silesia, now Racibórz, Poland – 11 April 1876 in Berlin) was a German medical doctor and co-founder of the experimental pathology in Germany.

== Biography ==
Ludwig Traube was a son of a Jewish wine merchant. In 1835, at age 17, he left the gymnasium in Ratibor. He studied medicine in Breslau, Berlin and Vienna. Among his teachers were Jan Evangelista Purkyně (1787–1869) and Johannes Müller (1801–1858). Besides medicine, he was very active in philosophical studies; he especially appreciated the philosophy of Spinoza. In 1840 he received his doctorate („Specimina nonnulla physiologica et pathologica“), a work about pulmonary emphysema. Then he moved to Vienna to broaden his knowledge (Baron Carl von Rokitansky (1804–1878) and Joseph Škoda (1805–1881). Since 1841 he was assistant of a physician for paupers in Berlin. In 1848 he became an unsalaried lecturer and in 1849 the first civilian assistant of Johann Lukas Schönlein (1793–1865) at the Charité. Ludwig Traube was involved as physician during the revolutionary occurrences in 1848. The later well-known botanist Nathanael Pringsheim (1823–1894), who was a friend of Traube, was arrested during the fighting. Another friend of Pringsheim was severely wounded, but saved by the help of Ludwig Traube. In 1853 Traube became the leading physician of the pulmonary department at the Charité and later chief of the propaedeutic clinic. He was also teacher at the military-medically seminaries. At the hospital of the Jewish community in Berlin he was head physician of the internal medicine department. Traube's Jewish ancestry was a great handicap for his career, but despite this he became in 1857 an adjunct professor, and in 1862 ordinary professor at the Friedrich-Wilhelms-Institute in Berlin. In 1866 he got the title “Geheimer Medizinalrath” and in 1872 he was appointed a professor at the University of Berlin. Ludwig Traube had a coronary disease, which led to death. His grave is at the Jewish cemetery Berlin Schönhauser Allee.

Ludwig Traube was the elder brother of Moritz Traube, who was an extraordinary private scholar and a pioneer of physiological chemistry. The Berlin physician Moritz Litten (1845–1907) was his son-in-law. Ludwig Traube married Cora Marckwald, and they had 3 daughters and 2 sons. It was an impressing happening, when a son died from diphtheria the age of 5 years. Another son, Ludwig Traube (1861–1907), was a palaeographer. His nephews Wilhelm Traube (chemist, 1866–1942) and Albert Fraenkel (physician, 1848–1916) belong also to the scholars-family Traube-Litten-Fraenkel. One of his daughters was Margarete Traube, a chemist and activist, married firstly to the physiologist and histologist Franz Christian Boll and secondly to the Italian engineer and politician Guglielmo Mengarini. Another daughter was the mother of Anna Fraentzel Celli, a nurse and philanthropist.

== Assessments ==
Ludwig Traube earned great fame and honours by his establishing experimental pathophysiological research in Germany (e.g. he did animal experiments in the 1840s in his Berlin flat in the Oranienburger Str.) He improved the physical-medical methods like auscultation and percussion and was a taxonomist of the medical documentation. (e.g. inaugural of the temperature-pulse-frequency of respiration-curve into clinical praxis). He investigated the pathophysiology of respiration and the regulation of the body temperature, and gave a scientific basis to digitalis therapy. The narrow coherencies between heart and kidney diseases have been well demonstrated. He worked together with Rudolf Virchow (1821–1902), they substantiated the „Beiträge zur experimentellen Pathologie“.

== Acknowledgments ==
The University of Leiden awarded Ludwig Traube the honorary doctorate in 1875. In the areal of Charité was built in 1878 a memorial monument. A street of Ratibor was named "Dr. Traubestraße“ in 1927. Some eponymous are associated to Ludwig Traube and describe clinical phenomena of auscultation, palpation and percussion: Traube's bruit, Traube's corpuscles, Traube's double tone, Traube's dyspnea, Traube's plugs, Traube's pulse, Traube's space and Traube-Hering-Mayer waves.

== Bibliography ==
- Die Ursachen und die Beschaffenheit derjenigen Veränderungen, welche das Lungenparenchym nach Durchschneidung der Nn. vagi erleidet. Berlin, 1845.
- Beitrag zur Lehre von den Erstickungserscheinungen am Respirationsapparat. Beiträge zur experimentellen Pathologie, 1846 and 1847.
- Ueber periodische Thätigkeits-Aeusserungen des vasomotorischen und Hemmungs-Nervencentrum. Centralblatt für die Medicinischen Wissenschaften, Berlin, 1865, 3: 881–885.
- Die Symptome der Krankheiten des Respirations und Circulations-Apparats. Vorlesungen gehalten an der Friedrich-Wilhelm-Universität zu Berlin. Berlin: Hirschwald, 1867.
- Gesammelte Beiträge zur Pathologie und Physiologie. Berlin, Hirschwald, 1871–1878.
- Ein Fall von Pulsus bigeminus nebst Bemerkungen über die Leberschwellungen bei Klappenfehlern und über acute Leberatrophie. Berliner Klinische Wochenschrift, 1872, 9: 185–188, 221–224.

== Sources and literature ==
- Nachlass TRAUBE-LITTEN. Staatsbibliothek zu Berlin. Preussischer Kulturbesitz. Handschriftenabt.
- Traube, Ludwig.: Briefe an Virchow (Literaturarchiv der Deutschen Akademie der Wissenschaften zu Berlin, NL-Virchow 2188, 9 Bl.
- Berndt, H.: Ludwig Traubes Beitrag zur Nephrologie. Zeitschr. Urol. Nephrol. 79 (1986) 171–174
- Jüdisches Lexikon. Berlin (1930) 1034–1035
- Winninger, S.: Große Jüdische Nationalbiografie. Bd. 6, Bukarest (1936) 125–126
- Henrik Franke: Moritz Traube (1826–1894) Vom Weinkaufmann zum Akademiemitglied, "Studien und Quellen zur Geschichte der Chemie", Band 9, Verlag für Wissenschafts- und Regionalgeschichte Dr. Michael Engel, ISBN 978-3-929134-21-6
