= Franz Boll (historian) =

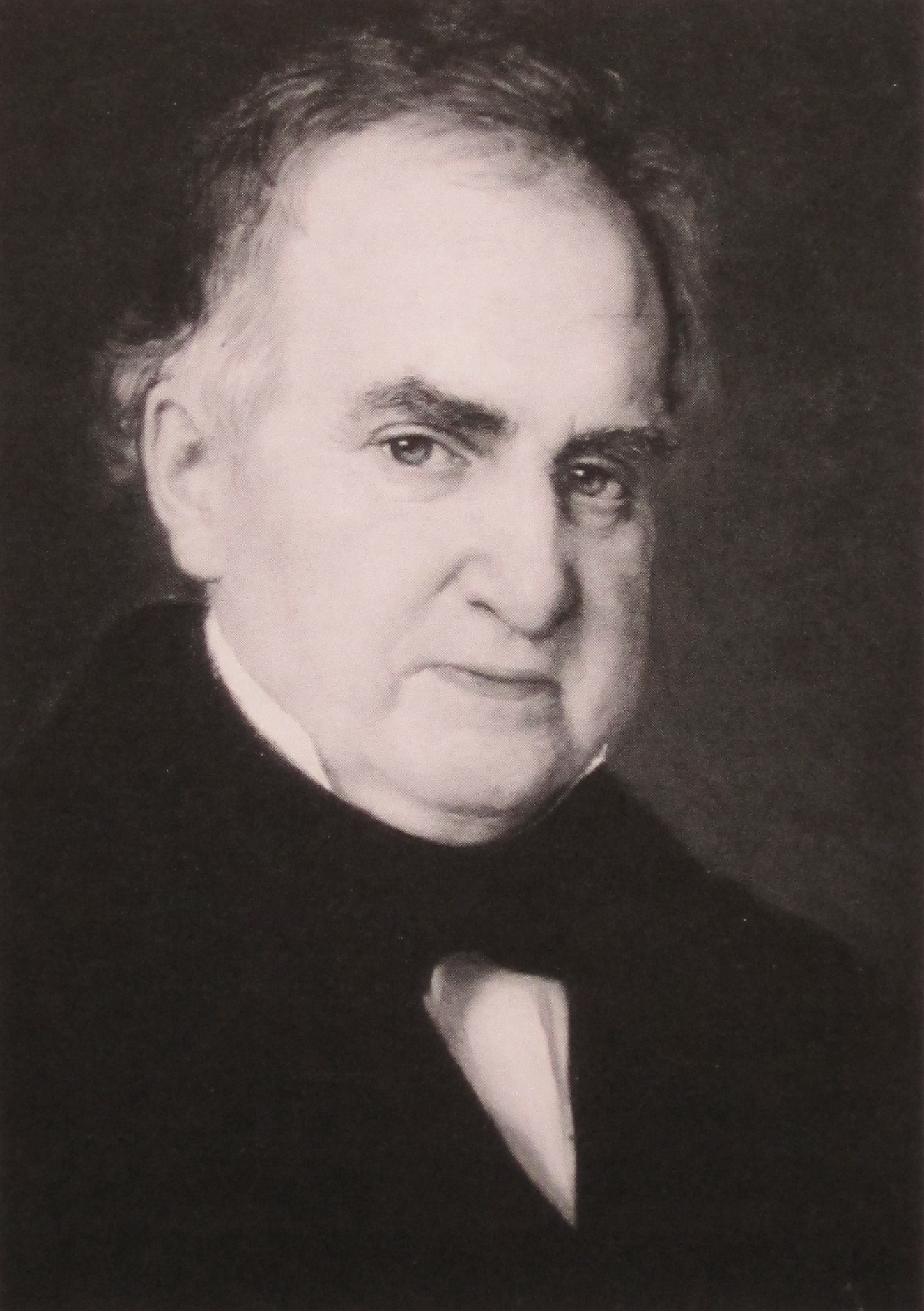
Franz Boll (1874)

Franz Christian Boll (17 October 1805 in Neubrandenburg – 20 March 1875) was a Lutheran theologian and historian. He was the father of physiologist Franz Christian Boll (1849–1879), and the brother of naturalist Ernst Boll (1817–1868), with whom he collaborated throughout his career.

He studied theology in Halle, Berlin and Rostock, and in 1835 returned to Neubrandenburg as a pastor and school teacher. In 1866 he became "Praepositus" of the Neubrandenburg Synod.

As a historian, Boll dealt largely with the history of the Mecklenburg region in Germany. This work involved investigations of documented information contained in various towns and churches, including intensive study on the history of Neubrandenburg and the Broda monastery. His two-volume work, Geschichte der Lande Stargard bis 1470, was an historical account of Mecklenburg-Stargard prior to the year 1470. Boll also performed archaeological research in the Mecklenburg region, and with his brother, he collaborated on Die Geschichte Mecklenburgs, mit besonderer Berücksichtigung der Culturgeschichte, a two-volume treatise involving the history of Mecklenburg, with particular attention given to its cultural history.

Boll was an active member of the Neubrandenburger Reformbewegung, a confederation that was part of the reform movement of 1848. As his career progressed, he became good friends with novelist Fritz Reuter (1810–1874).

== Publications ==
- Geschichte des Landes Stargard bis 1470, two volumes. 1846
- Die Geschichte Mecklenburgs, mit besonderer Berücksichtigung der Culturgeschichte. 1855–1856, two volumes (primary author Ernst Boll).
- Chronik der Vorderstadt Neubrandenburg. 1875
- "Freut euch, ihr Mecklenburger!" – Mecklenburg im Jahre 1848. surviving manuscript, first released in 1998.
