= Codices Latini Antiquiores =

Catalogue of manuscripts in Latin

Codices Latini Antiquiores ("The More Ancient Latin Manuscripts"), generally abbreviated CLA, is a catalogue of all surviving manuscripts in Latin (whether codices or scrolls) written before the 9th century. The complete title of the work is Codices Latini Antiquiores: A Paleographical Guide to Latin Manuscripts Prior to the Ninth Century. Elias Avery Lowe founded the project in 1929 and directed it himself until his death in 1969.

== Origin, contents and editions ==
At the beginning of the 20th century, the history of Latin script was insufficiently known and based only on partial analyses. Historians strongly felt a need for a complete international catalogue of early manuscripts, to evaluate the differences in importance between the various cultural centres of book production, the transmission of ancient culture, and the creation of new ways of writing.

CLA covers only literary works; this includes legal texts but not documentary texts such as charters. It has 11 volumes, organized according to the current location of the manuscripts; these were followed by a supplement in 1971 and two sets of addenda published in 1985 and 1992. Paleography is the foundational principle of the project: every entry is accompanied by a photograph of the manuscript in black and white, at a 1:1 scale, along with a description of its contents, its state of preservation, the kind of writing used, and the possible date and geographical origin.

=== Similar works ===
Two similar projects have appeared: the first one for documentary texts from antiquity and the Early Middle Ages, under the title Chartae Latinae Antiquiores (ChLA). The second, under the title Manuscrits datés, was directed under the auspices of the Comité international de paléographie latine. Unlike CLA and ChLA, it covers the entire medieval period, but is confined to manuscripts bearing a specific date or datable within a narrow period.

Other editorial projects have a more limited scope:

- Gamber, Klaus (1919–1989), Codices liturgici latini antiquiores, Freiburg, Universitätsverlag, 1963; 2nd ed. 1968; suppl. and index, 1988.

=== Reprint of 1988 ===
CLA was reprinted in 1988, though in a reduced format in comparison to the original.

== Author and collaborators ==
CLA is a major work for the understanding of the history of writing during Late Antiquity and the Early Middle Ages. The collection, representing the masterwork of Elias Avery Lowe during his activity at Princeton University, had its roots in Lowe's doctoral thesis about the oldest calendars from Monte Cassino (1908) under the direction of Ludwig Traube.

R. A. B. (Roger Aubrey Baskerville) Mynors (1903–1989), professor of Latin at Oxford University and editor, coauthored the last volumes.

The German palaeographer, Bernhard Bischoff, worked on CLA starting from 1933, and is responsible for many of the descriptions. He subsequently embarked on a comparable catalogue of ninth-century continental manuscripts which remained unfinished at his death; two volumes have since appeared, covering libraries alphabetically from Aachen to Paderborn.

== Historical information and statistics ==
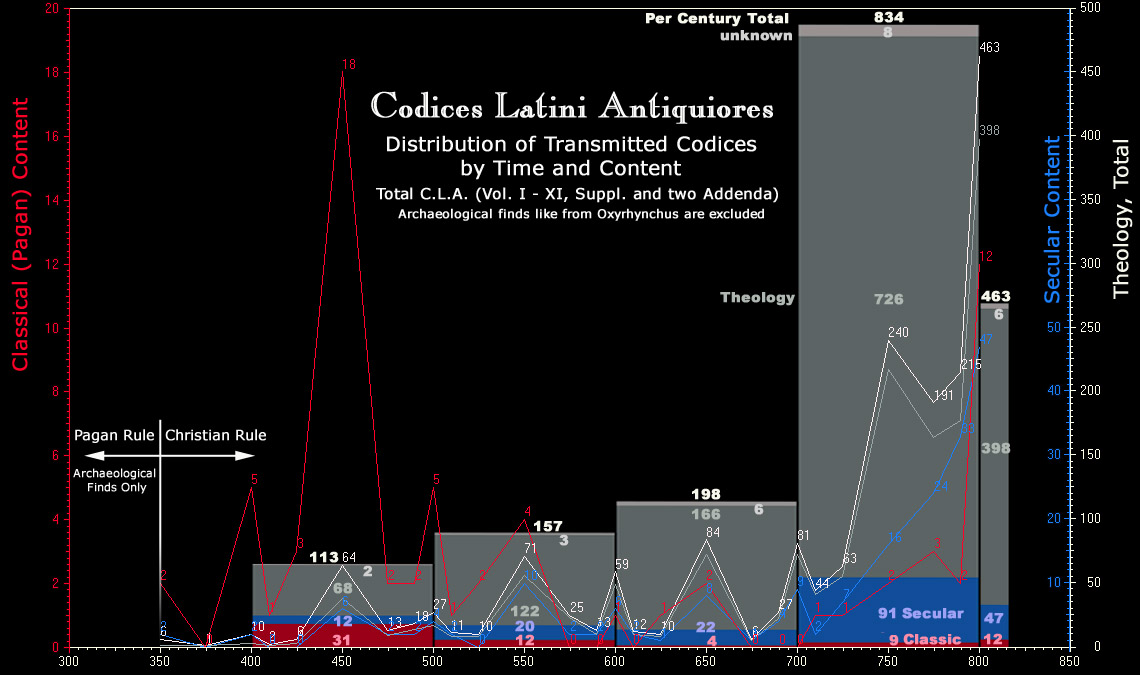
CLA statistics: Contents

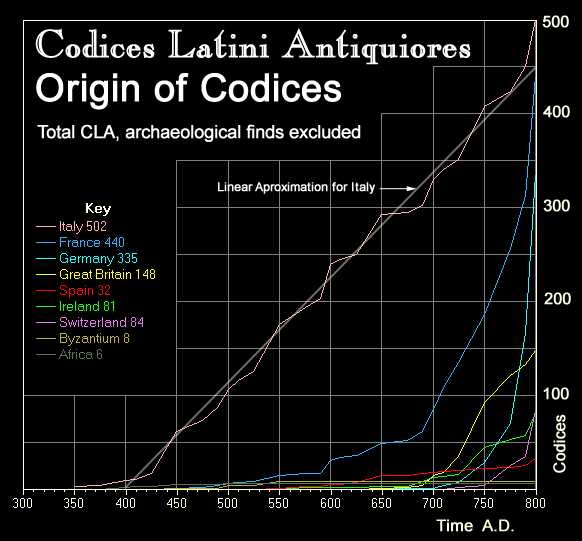
CLA statistics: Provenance

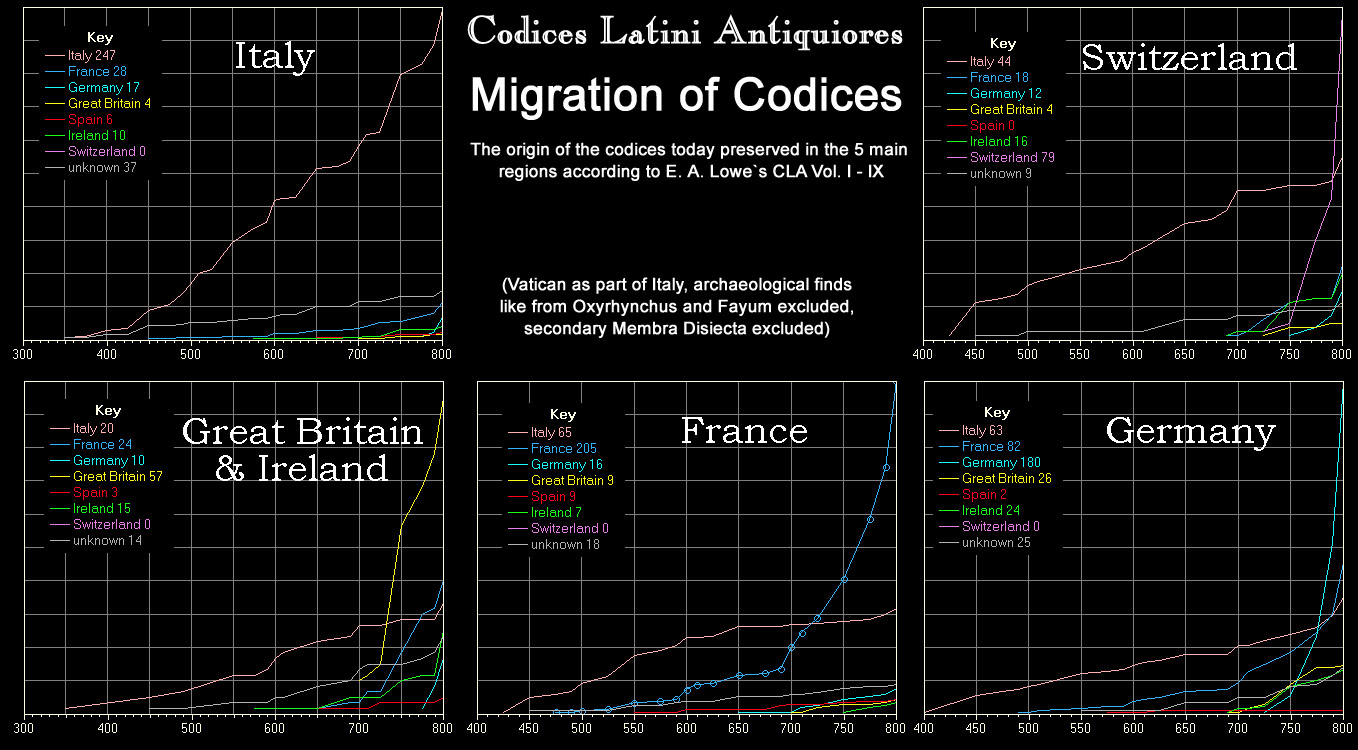

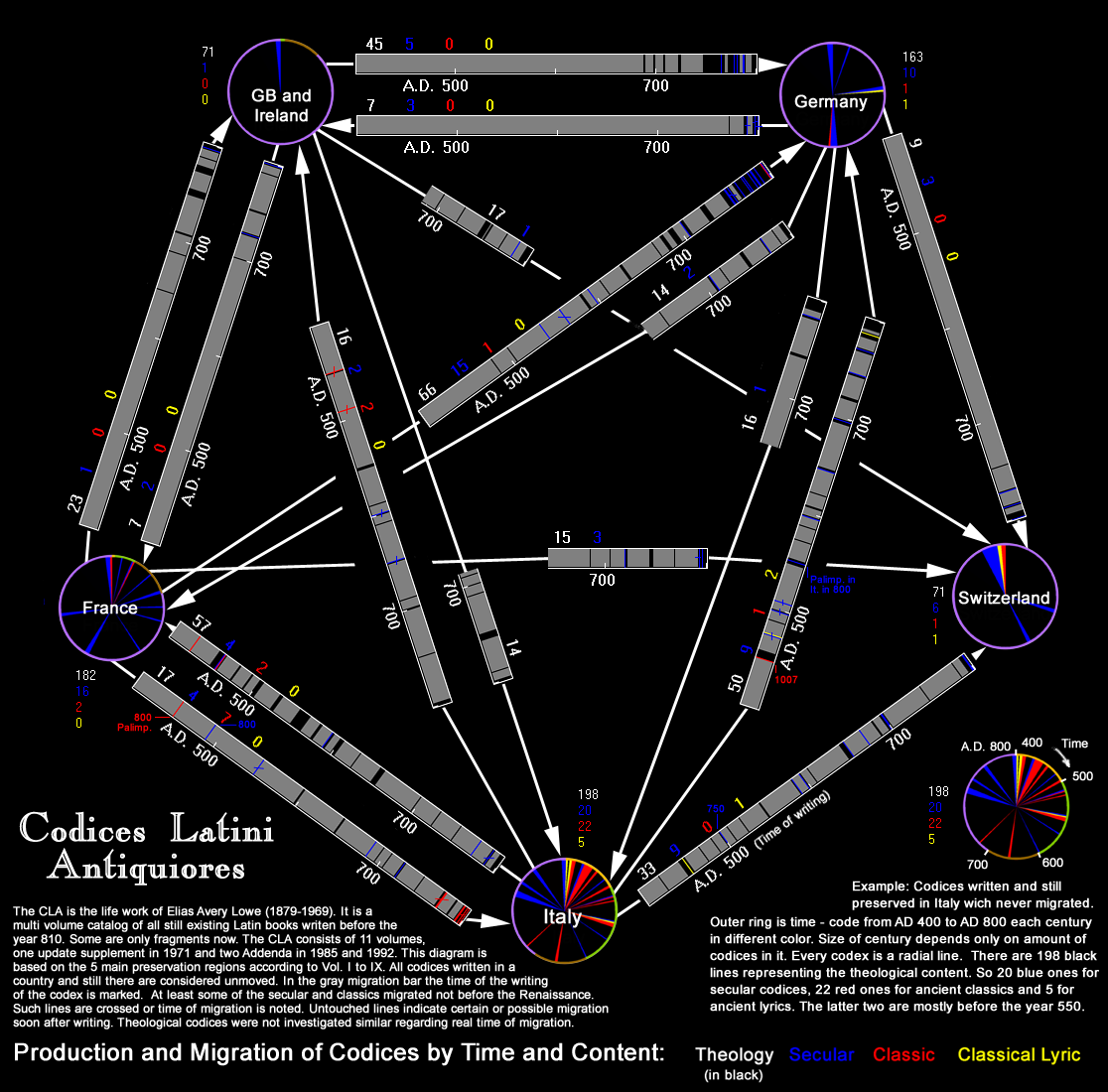

Together with the various supplements, the CLA comprises 1884 codices or scrolls and more than 2,000 works, including a great number of fragments. Before the mid 4th century, only fragmentary scraps of literary texts and ancient classics survive; afterwards, until 800, most works are of a theological character. The copying and production of texts of secular interest stopped almost completely around the 6th and 7th centuries.

The facts found about Italy, in particular, are remarkable. Between 400 and 800 AD, the production of books is constant, and the number of surviving works grows over time. These Italian works, most of which are of theological interest, were exported to all of Europe until such places started production of books of their own. In France, this only occurs in the mid 8th century; in England and Ireland, around 730; in Germany and Switzerland, around 800. From the 5th to the 7th century, the most important movement of books goes from Italy to France. During the 8th century, the transportation of manuscripts from France, Ireland and England towards the continent is culturally and historically important.

However, such statistics cannot be determined for classical pagan works, which were apparently displaced more recently.

== List of volumes ==
Codices Latini Antiquiores. A Palaeographical Guide to Latin Manuscripts Prior to the Ninth Century. Ed. Elias Avery Lowe:

Subject/Territories covered	Publication details
Vatican City	Oxford 1934 (Codices Latini Antiquiores 1).
Great Britain and Ireland	Oxford 1935; 2d ed. 1972 (Codices Latini Antiquiores 2).
Italy. Ancona – Novara	Oxford 1938 (Codices Latini Antiquiores 3).
Italy. Perugia – Verona	Oxford 1947 (Codices Latini Antiquiores 4).
France. Paris	Oxford 1950 (Codices Latini Antiquiores 5).
France. Abbeville – Valenciennes	Oxford 1953 (Codices Latini Antiquiores 6)
Switzerland	Oxford 1956 (Codices Latini Antiquiores 7).
Germany. Altenburg – Leipzig	Oxford 1959 (Codices Latini Antiquiores 8).
Germany. München – Zittau	Oxford 1959 (Codices Latini Antiquiores 9).
Austria, Belgium, Czechoslovakia, Denmark, Egypt and Holland	Oxford 1963 (Codices Latini Antiquiores 10).
Hungary, Luxembourg, Poland, Russia, Spain, Sweden, USA and Yugoslavia	Oxford 1966 (Codices Latini Antiquiores 11).
Supplement	Oxford 1971 (Codices Latini Antiquiores 12).
Index of scripts	Comp. by Rutherford Aris. Osnabrück: Zeller 1982.
Addenda to Codices latini antiquiores. Bernhard Bischoff and Virginia Brown. Toronto, 1985 (reprint of Mediaeval Studies 47, p. 317 – 366).
Addenda to Codices latini antiquiores (II). Bernhard Bischoff, Virginia Brown, and James J. John. Toronto, 1992 (reprint of Mediaeval Studies 54, p. 286 – 307).

== Bibliography ==
- Bieler, Ludwig. “Codices Latini Antiquiores, a Palaeographical Guide to Latin Manuscripts Prior to the Ninth Century, Part X.” American journal of philology 1964: 209–211.
- Julian Brown, "E.A. Lowe and Codices Latini Antiquiores", Scrittura e Civiltà, 1 (1977), pp. 177–197.
- J.J. John, "E.A. Lowe and Codices latini antiquiores," American Council of Learned Societies Newsletter 20/5 (1969), pp. 1–17.
- Jean Mallon, « [review of] E. A. LOWE. Codices latini antiquiores, a palaeographical guide to Latin manuscripts prior to the ninth century. Part VI (France: Abbeville-Valenciennes) [outside Paris]. Part VII (Switzerland). Oxford, Clarendon Press, 1953 et 1956. », Bibliothèque de l'école des chartes, 115/1 (1957) p. 198-201. Online (in French).
