= O Roma nobilis =

C. 10th century Latin poem

O Roma nobilis is a Latin poem probably written in Verona some time in the tenth century, and a traditional song for pilgrims arriving to the tombs of Saint Peter and Saint Paul in Rome.

== Analysis ==
=== Structure ===
The medieval paean poem O Roma nobilis is composed of three monorhymed stanzas of six verses in the form of an Asclepiadian ode.

=== Textual criticism ===
The first stanza praises Christian Rome, the second invokes the aid of Saint Peter, and the third, that of Saint Paul. The text is complete in only one manuscript kept at the Vatican library (Vat. lat. 3227) from the early 12th century; a second manuscript comes from the abbey of Monte Cassino (Monte Cassino 318) and is date from the 11th century but it carries only the first strophe.

== History ==
O Roma nobilis is a non-liturgical poem most frequently described, but without basis, as a medieval pilgrims' song. It is often associated to the other pilgrim hymn in honor of Saint Peter and Paul, O roma felix quae duorum principum.

Stemming back to the glory of the Roma aurea e aeterna of the Roman Empire, the language of exaltation of the Rome finds an echo in the 9th-century poetry of Liutprand of Cremona in Versus de Mediolani civitate. The Beneventan script found in the earliest manuscripts of O Roma nobilis suggests an origin it was composed in or near the abbey of Monte Cassino, probably from the late ninth or early tenth century.

O Roma nobilis was discovered anew in the early 19th century. Its literary fame rests mainly upon the studies of Barthold Georg Niebuhr from 1829 and Ludwig Traube in 1891.

In 1941, the millennial hymn was translated into English by Irish author and journalist Aodh de Blácam.

It was declared the official hymn of the holy year of 1950.

In a show of ecclesial triumphalism, Igino Cecchetti published an essay entitled Roma nobilis in 1953 which received praise from the Jesuit review La Civiltà Cattolica in 1955.

At the opening of the Second Vatican Council, Pope John XXIII referred to this hymn when referring to the Apostle Peter as the title of honor for Rome, worthily celebrated in the words of this poem.

== Music ==
As early as 1822 the poem was being sung in a choral setting by the papal choirmaster Giuseppe Baini, being popular not only in Rome, but also in Berlin, where Crown Prince Frederick William IV heard Baini's setting of O Roma nobilis at the Singakademie in Berlin on November 27, 1827 and it reached even the ears of German poet Goethe. Baini claimed to have drawn his melody from the not readily intelligible neumes of the Vatican manuscript. In 1909 at Fribourg, P. Wagner published the Vatican melody from the exact notation given in the Monte Cassino manuscript (I-MC 318, p.291) and demonstrated the complete inauthenticity of Baini's transcription. In both text and melody it is the matter of rhythm that largely occupies scholars today, although they are concerned also with the relation of the authentic melody of this poem to a secular piece, O admirabile Veneris idolum, which is constructed on exactly the same plan.

Original settings of O Roma nobilis were produced by Franz Liszt in 1879 and Lorenzo Perosi in 1940.

== Lyrics ==
Latin	English translation by Aodh de Blacam (1941)
O Roma nobilis, orbis et domina, cunctarum urbium excellentissima, roseo martyrum sanguine rubea, albis et virginum liliis candida, salutem dicimus tibi per omnia, te benedicimus: salve per saecula!	Queen of the earth, O thou Rome of nobility, Thou the most excellent City of cities, Red with the rubrical blood of the Martyrs, White with the Virginal garments and lilies : Thee we hail as we come to thy portal Guard us, govern us, City immortal !
Petre, tu praepotens caelorum claviger, Vota precantium exaudi jugiter. Cum bis sex tribuum sederis arbiter, Factus placabilis judica leniter. Teque petentibus nunc temporaliter Ferto suffragia misericorditer.	Marching we come, O celestial Key-keeper : Hear the prayer of thy pilgrims, 0 Peter ! And when thou sittest as judge of the nations Turn a favouring face on thy people : That as accepted. in Heaven we may to thee Come at the last, who here on earth pray to thee.
O Paule, suscipe nostra precamina, Cujus philosophos vicit industria. Factus oeconomus in domo regia Divini muneris appone fercula, Ut, quae repleverit te sapientia, Ipsa nos repleat tua per dogmata.	Hear thou also, O Paul, our pleading, Thou who patiently vanquished the heathen Grant, we beg thee, a share of thy benefits, Thou, Dispenser of Heavenly teaching— That as pilgrims we find our guide in thee God at length may bid us abide with thee
