= Elias Avery Lowe =

Russian-American paleographer (1879–1969)

- Born: Elias Avery Loew; 15 October 1879; Moscow, Russia
- Died: 8 August 1969 (aged 89); Bad Nauheim, Germany
- Spouse: H. T. Lowe-Porter
- Children: 3
- Relatives: Charlotte Johnson Wahl (granddaughter); James Fawcett (son-in-law); Edmund Fawcett (grandson); Boris, Rachel & Jo Johnson (great-grandchildren)

Academic background
- Education: City College of New York; Cornell University; University of Halle; Ludwig-Maximilians-Universität München
- Thesis: Die ältesten Kalendarien aus Monte Cassino (1908)
- Doctoral advisor: Ludwig Traube

Academic work
- Discipline: Palaeography and codicology
- Institutions: University of Oxford; Institute for Advanced Study
- Notable works: Codices Latini Antiquiores

Elias Avery Lowe (15 October 1879 – 8 August 1969), originally surnamed Loew, and known in print as E. A. Lowe, was a Russian-American palaeographer at the University of Oxford and Princeton University. He was a lecturer, and then reader, at the University of Oxford from 1913 to 1936, and a professor at Princeton's Institute for Advanced Study from 1936.

== Early life ==
Elias Avery Loew was born on 15 October 1879 in Moscow (then part of the Russian Empire) to a Jewish family headed by Charles Loew, a silk and embroidery merchant, and his wife, Sarah Ragoler. He immigrated to New York City with his parents in 1892, becoming a citizen of the United States in 1900. In 1918, he altered the spelling of his surname to Lowe.

== Education and career ==
After studying at the College of the City of New York (now City College of New York) from 1894 to 1897, Lowe obtained a BA at Cornell University in 1902. Thereafter, he studied briefly at the University of Halle, and then at the Ludwig-Maximilians-Universität München where, under the supervision of Ludwig Traube, he completed his doctorate in 1908. He first lectured at the University of Oxford in 1913. In 1914, he gave the Sandars Lectures on bibliography at the University of Cambridge. In the same year Oxford granted him a regular appointment as lecturer, appointing him reader in 1927. Nearly all of Lowe's paleography teaching occurred at the latter institution. Although he became one of the first professors at Princeton's Institute for Advanced Study (where no teaching was required) in 1936, he continued to lecture at Oxford during Trinity terms until 1948. In addition, he acted as a consultant in paleography for the Library of Congress, and, from 1911 to 1953, as research associate in paleography for the Carnegie Institution of Washington.

Lowe wrote several important works on early medieval paleography, including The Beneventan Script (his 1914 study of the oldest extant manuscript of St Benedict's rule), and his collected Palaeographical Papers, 1907–1965 (published posthumously in 1972). He remains best known, however, for the eleven-volume Codices Latini Antiquiores (CLA) which offers a palaeographical guide to all extant Latin literary manuscripts copied in scripts antedating the ninth century. Published 1934–1971, this monumental work covers over 1,800 manuscripts from repositories in twenty-one countries, providing detailed descriptions and one or more facsimiles for each manuscript.

== Recognition ==
An internationally respected authority in his field, Lowe received formal recognition from numerous academies, institutes, and scholarly societies. He was awarded the Medieval Academy of America's Haskins Medal in 1957, the gold medal of the Bibliographical Society in 1959, and had honorary doctoral degrees conferred on him by the University of Oxford (1936), the University of North Carolina (1946), and the National University of Ireland (1964). From 1954 until his death in 1969, he was an Honorary Fellow of Corpus Christi College of Oxford University.

== Personal life and death ==
In 1911, Lowe married the translator Helen Tracy Lowe-Porter. The couple had three daughters. Among their descendants are English artist Charlotte Johnson Wahl, and her son, journalist and politician Boris Johnson, the former Prime Minister of the UK.

Although Lowe "never abandoned his solidarity with the Jewish people", he declined to practise Judaism. Towards the end of his life he told one of his daughters that, were he to adhere to a religion, he would opt for Roman Catholicism.

Lowe died on 8 August 1969 in Bad Nauheim, Germany. His ashes were interred at Corpus Christi College, Oxford.

== Legacy ==
A series of lectures on palaeography, the Triennial E. A. Lowe Lectures, continues to be held at Corpus Christi College in his memory.

== Selected publications ==
- Die ältesten Kalendarien in Monte Cassino (Doctoral dissertation, Munich, 1908)
- Studia Palaeographica: A Contribution to the History of Early Latin Minuscule and to the Dating of Visigothic Manuscripts (Munich, 1910)
- The Beneventan Script: A History of the South Italian Minuscule (Oxford, 1914; 2nd ed., Rome, 1980)
- Codices Lugdunenses Antiquissimi. Le Scriptorium de Lyon, la Plus Ancienne École Calligraphique de France (Lyon, 1924)
- Handwriting: Our Medieval Legacy (Rome, 1969)
- Palaeographical Papers, 1907–1965, ed. Ludwig Bieler (Oxford, 1972)

== Bibliography ==
- Bischoff, Bernhard (1970). "Elias Avery Lowe, 15.10.1879–8.8.1969". Jahrbuch der Bayerischen Akademie der Wissenschaften: 203 ff.
- Bischoff, Bernhard. 2015. “En Route for CLA: For E. A. Lowe and with E. A. Lowe.” Peritia 26: 29–46.
- John, James J. (1970). "A Palaeographer among Benedictines: A Tribute to E. A. Lowe". American Benedictine Review. 21: 1–17.
- Lowe, Patricia Tracy (2006). A Marriage of True Minds: A Memoir of My Parents, Helen Tracy Lowe-Porter and Elias Avery Lowe. New Paltz, NY. ISBN 0-9642350-4-8.
