= Paul Lehmann =

German palaeographer and philologist (1884–1964)

- Born: 13 July 1884; Braunschweig, German Empire
- Died: 4 January 1964 (aged 79); Munich, West Germany
- Education: University of Göttingen
- Scientific career
- Fields: Palaeography, philology
- Workplaces: Ludwig-Maximilians-Universität München

Paul Lehmann (13 July 1884 – 4 January 1964) was a German paleographer and philologist.

== Biography ==
Paul Lehmann was the son of businessman Gustav Lehmann and his wife Louisa Meyer. After attending school in his hometown, Lehmann started studying at the University of Göttingen. A successor to Ludwig Traube, Paul Lehmann began as docent at the Ludwig-Maximilians-Universität München in 1911 and became professor of medieval Latin philology there in 1917. Author of a dissertation on Franciscus Modius and a Habilitationsschrift on Johannes Sichardus, he made numerous contributions to the Sitzungsberichte der bayerischen Akademie. He is best known for Parodie im Mittelalter (1922). He also authored Pseudo-Antike Literatur des Mittelalters (1927) and published Mittelalterliche Bibliothekskataloge Deutschlands und der Schweiz. Lehmann assisted Max Manitius in the preparation of the third volume of the Geschichte der lateinischen Literatur des Mittelalters. He was named a Corresponding Fellow of the Medieval Academy of America in 1926, as well as fellow of numerous other European academies. A Festschrift entitled Liber Floridus, in honor of his sixty-fifth birthday, was published in 1950.

== Publications ==
- Franciscus Modius 1908
- Mittelalterliche Bibliothekskataloge Deutschlands und der Schweiz (1918 ff.)
- Die Parodie im Mittelalter (1922, 2nd edition 1963)
- Das literarische Bild Karls des Großen vornehmlich im lateinischen Schrifttum des Mittelalters (1934)
- Geschichte der Fuggerbibliotheken (1956/60, 2 volumes)
- Pseudoantike Literatur (1927)
- Gesta Ernesti ducis (1927)
- Judas Ischarioth (1930)
- Skandinavische Reisefrüchte (1935/39)
