= David Ganz (art historian) =

David Ganz (born 1970) is a German art historian and academic. Since 2019, he has been Professor of Art History of the Middle Ages at the University of Zurich.

Born in Stuttgart in 1970, from 1990 to 2000 Ganz variously studied at Heidelberg, Marburg, the University of Bologna, the Art History Institute at Florence, the Bibliotecha Hertziana in Rome and the University of Hamburg, completing a PhD at the latter in 2000; he completed his habilitation at the University of Konstanz in 2006.

Ganz was a research associate at the Westphalian Wilhelms-University from 2000 to 2005, a research assistant at the Otto-Friedrich-Universität Bamberg from 2005 to 2006, and a substitute for the chair in early modern art history at the Ruhr University Bochum from 2006 to 2007. He was then a Heisenberg Fellow until 2013, when he was appointed an associate professor of art history of the Middle Ages at the University of Zurich, where he was promoted to a full professorship in 2019.

== Books ==
- Barocke Bilderbauten. Erzählung, Illusion und Institution in römischen Kirchen. 1580–1700, Petersberg: Michael Imhof 2003.
- Medien der Offenbarung. Visiondarstellungen im Mittelalter, Berlin: Reimer 2008.
- Buch-Gewänder. Prachteinbände im Mittelalter, Berlin: Reimer 2015.
- (with Ulrike Ganz). Visionen der Endzeit. Die Apokalypse in der mittelalterlichen Buchkunst, Darmstadt: Wissenschaftliche Buchgesellschaft 2016.
- Der Bamberger Psalter. Kommentarband zum Faksimile (mit Beiträgen von Karin Eckstein, Sybille Ruß und Bettina Wagner), Luzern: Quaternio 2019.
- Spaces of Revelation. Visions in Medieval Art, Turnhout: Brepols 2021 (Studies in the Visual Culture of the Middle Ages) [English translation of Medien der Offenbarung].
