= Jubilaeum maximum =

1949 papal bull by Pope Pius XII

Jubilaeum maximum (May 26, 1949) was the papal bull of Pope Pius XII announcing a Holy Year for 1950.

== Purpose and timing ==
In the papal bull, Pope Pius XII invited all faithful to the Eternal City of Rome to celebrate a Holy Year, to change and sanctify one's life. A renaissance of humanity was possible, if all people would turn away from earthly secular things to things eternal. Public life must respect the commandments of Christ. The world needed to be changed according to the spirit of his gospel. The Catholic bishops were asked to redirect the faithful to this end, whether in Rome or at home.

The great jubilee was to begin at Christmas 1949 and to conclude at Christmas 1950. A complete indulgence was granted to those faithful who visited the four major basilicas – Saint Peter, St. Paul outside the Walls, Basilica di Santa Maria Maggiore and Saint John Lateran – and undertake a series of prayers there. Exemptions were granted to those who were sick. Pope Pius defined the goal for the Holy Year 1950: to do penance and to pray for the return to Christ of all those who were separated from him.

- Those who hate God, may see his light. May social justice spread around the globe to ensure that hunger disappears. May peace enter the hearts of people and families. May all those be strong, who have to suffer because of justice and persecution.

The Pope prayed for peace in Palestine, whose sacred locations were not secure. He invited all the faithful to Rome, knowing how difficult this was in war-torn (Note: World War II had ended in 1945, but Europe was still physically and emotionally ravaged.) Europe. But he reminded the faithful of all the difficulties they often undertook for some earthly gains. How many more difficulties were worthy of eternal salvation? The pilgrimages should not be secular excursions but motivated by pious ideals.

The Latin hymn O Roma nobilis was the official hymn of the Jubilee year.
