= Ludwig Traube (palaeographer) =

German classical philologist (1861–1907)

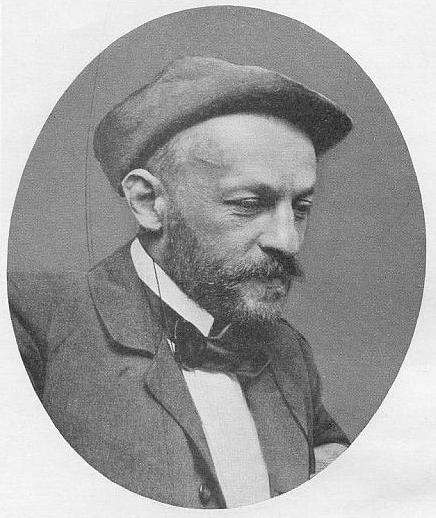
Ludwig Traube

Ludwig Traube (19 June 1861, Berlin, Germany – 19 May 1907) was a German paleographer and held the first chair of Medieval Latin in Germany while at the Ludwig-Maximilians-Universität München. He was a son of the physician Ludwig Traube (1818–1876), and the brother of the chemist Margarete Traube (1856–1912).

Traube made pioneering contributions to medieval manuscript studies and especially paleography, arguing that these were not merely technical "Hilfswissenschaften", but autonomous areas of intellectual and cultural history.

== Early life and education ==
Traube was born in Berlin, the son of a middle-class Jewish family that boasted several eminent scientists. His father, Ludwig Traube, Sr., was a famous pulmonologist and medical researcher at Berlin's Charité hospital. The younger Traube's interests tended more towards languages and the humanities, and he studied classical philology at the Ludwig-Maximilians-Universität München and the University of Greifswald. In 1883, he completed his Ph.D. at Munich with a dissertation entitled "Varia libamenta critica" ("Various Critical Tidbits"), which proposed a number of textual emendations and corrections to contemporary editions of Latin authors. He habilitated in classical and medieval philology in 1888 with a study of the ninth-century Anglo-Saxon poet Æthelwulf, which he published alongside several other critical essays on early medieval Latin poetry.

== Editor at the MGH ==
His talent as a Latinist and textual critic caught the eye of the great historian of ancient Rome in Berlin Theodor Mommsen, who became a friend and mentor, and recommended the young Traube to the board of the Monumenta Germaniae Historica, and the Antiquities section editor Ernst Dümmler. From 1884, Traube was a researcher and editor at the MGH, first as an assistant to Mommsen, but eventually taking over editorship of the Poetae series from Dümmler, and joining the central board of directors in 1897. The third volume of the Poetae aevi Carolini ("Poets of the Carolingian Age") was published under his auspices in 1896. Over time, however, Traube grew dissatisfied with the modest remuneration he received from the MGH and felt increasingly out of step with its critical methodologies and editorial priorities. He resigned in 1904 to focus on his teaching and research, and after it became clear that the board was not going to support a permanent position for his colleague Paul von Winterfeld to continue editing the Poetae.

== Professional challenges and later career ==
Despite his distinguished reputation and productivity as a scholar, Traube faced antisemitic discrimination and remained an unsalaried lecturer (Privatdozent, or adjunct) for many years. Only in 1902, upon the intervention of Mommsen, was he finally appointed to a full professorship in Munich, and in 1904, to a newly created chair of Medieval Latin Philology, the first such position at a German university.

Traube's reputation as a scholar and teacher attracted students from around Europe and as far away as the United States, including E.A. Lowe and Edward Kennard Rand.

Throughout his life, Traube suffered from acute agoraphobia, traveling only reluctantly and preferring to host lectures and tutorials at his home near the Englischer Garten park, often in his garden, where he had converted a small cottage into an outdoor podium.

== Personal life ==
From his student days, Traube was a devoted patron of the arts, opera, and theater, and was at one point engaged to the portrait artist Sabine Graef (1862–1942), with whom he collaborated to publish a short-lived arts journal. Their relationship ended in 1888, however, and Traube later married Hildegard Hirth (1881–1908), the daughter of the Sinologist Friedrich Hirth, in 1901.

In 1905, he was diagnosed with leukemia, dying from it two years later at age 46. Hildegard, who also suffered ill-health, died a year later. They had no children.

Traube bequeathed his substantial personal library to the MGH, where it became the core of the institute's philological and paleographical research collection. His former pupil and assistant Paul Lehmann later succeeded him in the chair of Medieval Latin at the university.

== Selected works ==
- O Roma nobilis : philologische Untersuchungen aus dem Mittelalter, 1891 – O Roma nobilis: philological studies from the Middle Ages.
- Textgeschichte der Regula S. Benedicti, 1898 – Textual history of Regula Benedicti.
- Die Geschichte der tironischen Noten bei Suetonius und Isidorus, 1901 (2 volumes) – The history of Tironian notes from Suetonius and Isidorus.
- Jean-Baptiste Maugérard: ein Beitrag zur Bibliotheksgeschicthe, 1904 – Jean-Baptiste Maugérard, a contribution to library history.
- Bamberger Fragmente der vierten Dekade des Livius, 1906 – Bamberger fragments of the fourth decade of Livy.
- Nomina sacra : Versuch einer Geschichte der christlichen Kürzung, 1907 – Nomina sacra. Essay on the history of Christian abbreviations.
- Zur Paläographie und Handschriftenkunde, 1909 (edited by Franz Boll) – On palaeography and manuscript studies.
- Einleitung in die lateinische Philologie des Mittelalters, 1911 (edited by Franz Boll, Paul Lehmann) – Introduction to Latin philology of the Middle Ages.
- Vorlesungen und Abhandlungen, 1909–1920 (3 volumes, edited by Franz Boll, Samuel Brandt) – Lectures and essays.
