= Jean Vezin =

French librarian and historian (1933–2020)

Jean Vezin (30 July 1933 – 30 August 2020) was a French librarian and medievalist historian, specializing in Latin palaeography and codicology.

== Biography ==
Vezin was born in Vannes. A student at the École Nationale des Chartes, he obtained the archivist palaeographer diploma in 1958 with a thesis entitled Les scriptoria d’Angers au XIe siècle then joined the Casa de Velázquez.

A curator at the manuscript department of the Bibliothèque nationale de France from 1962 to 1974, he also taught palaeography at the Institute for Latin Studies of the Paris-Sorbonne University, as well as palaeography and codicology at the École nationale supérieure des sciences de l'information et des bibliothèques.

In 1974, he was elected a research director at the École pratique des hautes études. He was co-director of the Chartæ Latinæ Antiquiores and the Monumenta palæographica Medii Ævi.

He also headed the librarians-documentalists school of the Institut catholique de Paris from 1985 to 1998.

The author of more than two hundred articles, Vezin was elected a corresponding member of the Académie des Inscriptions et Belles-Lettres on 21 November 1997.
