= David Ganz (palaeographer) =

David Michael Ganz, FSA (born 1952), is a palaeographer and former academic. He was the fourth and final Professor of Palaeography at King's College London, a chair he held from 1997 to 2010.

David Michael Ganz was born in Welwyn in 1952 and educated at Merton College, Oxford, graduating with a BA in history in 1973 and a DPhil in 1980. He was a research assistant at St Andrews University from 1979 until 1980, when he was appointed an assistant professor of Latin at the University of North Carolina at Chapel Hill. He was promoted to an associate professorship in 1989. In 1997, he moved to King's College London to be the fourth holder of the Professorship of Palaeography (which was established in 1949), a chair he held until it was defunded in 2010. His books include Corbie in the Carolingian Renaissance (1990), Einhard and Notker the Stammerer: Two Lives of Charlemagne (2008) and Frankland: The Franks and the World of the Early Middle Ages: Essays in Honour of Dame Jinty Nelson (edited with Paul Fouracre, 2008). He was elected a Fellow of the Society of Antiquaries of London in 1989. He was elected a member of the Comité internationale de paléographie latine in 1997 and a Corresponding Member of the Monumenta Germaniae Historica in 2016.
