= Harrison M. Hayford =

American scholar and editor

- Born: November 1, 1916; Belfast, Waldo County
- Died: December 10, 2001 (aged 85); Evanston, Illinois
- Years active: 1942-2001
- Spouse: Josephine Bosworth Wishart
- Children: 4

Harrison Mosher Hayford (1 November 1916 - 10 December 2001) was a scholar of American literature, most prominently of Herman Melville, a book-collector, and a textual editor. He taught at Northwestern University from 1942 until his retirement in 1986. He was a leading figure in the post-World War II generation of Melville scholars who mounted the Melville Revival. He was General Editor of the Northwestern-Newberry The Writings of Herman Melville published by Northwestern University Press, which established reliable texts for all of Melville's works by using techniques of textual criticism.

G. Thomas Tanselle surveyed the scholarship about Herman Melville over the twentieth century and concluded that "Harrison Hayford has been responsible for more basic work —from the maintenance of a file of secondary material to the production of critical editions—than anyone else” .

Hayford received a Ford Foundation Fellowship in 1951; a Fulbright Fellowship in 1956-1957, which he spent in Florence, Italy; a Guggenheim Fellowship in 1962, which he spent in Paris, France. He helped found and served four terms as president of the Melville Society.

== Life and education ==
Harrison Hayford was born in Belfast, Maine, son of Ralph Hayford (1881 - 1945) and Marjorie Chase Hayford. He had two sisters, Viola (Glass), and Marion, who died of tuberculosis as a child.

Hayford's early life was spent on the Hayford Farm, which was established in 1821 and was in 1859 made the town Poorhouse Farm. The family prospered in business, construction, and dairy farming. The Hayford Block held a ballroom and theater in the center of town. Ralph Hayford, his father, was one of seven children (of eight). After his mother died shortly after childbirth in 1891, Ralph took over responsibility from his bereaved father, Loretto, and remained on the farm to support and educate his four younger siblings. One of Hayford's students later speculated that his love of story and language was nurtured by listening to the retired seamen who were taken into the poorhouse. The farm was auctioned by the county in the 1920s, however, when the family could not pay the taxes. Hayford attended a one-room school where his mother was the teacher, then graduated from Crosby High School in 1934.

He entered Tufts College, where he earned bachelor's degree in English in 1938 and a master's degree in 1940, with a thesis on the relation of social themes and religious values in American poetry. His undergraduate roommate was the poet John Ciardi. Their shared interest in poetry was sharpened by John Holmes, a nationally respected poet who taught at Tufts. Holmes held a weekly poetry reading and discussion session in his apartment, where Hayford and Ciardi met Josephine Bosworth Wishart, a graduate student whom both courted. In the spring of 1938 Hayford and Wishart eloped by street-car to Providence, where they married.

Hayford joined the cohort of students recruited by Yale English professor Stanley T. Williams for his graduate program in American literature, then a new field of study. Although Williams did not publish on Melville himself, he encouraged these students to focus on him. The first generation of Melville studies had accepted his books as reliably autobiographical, but this group went to archives and libraries and found that Melville had exaggerated or embellished his experience and taken material from many published sources. The Yale students became key players in the Melville Revival of the 1940s. Among them were Walter Bezanson and Merton M. Sealts (Sealts had been a classmate of Hayford's wife at Wooster College). Hayford had intended to write his doctoral thesis on Ralph Waldo Emerson, but when he found that he could not gain access to crucial archival papers, he turned to Melville. His dissertation on the relationship between Melville and Nathaniel Hawthorne has been called “seminal." Hayford discovered letters, journal extracts, and other materials which he later included in articles.

He joined the English department of Northwestern University in 1942 and retired after 44 years of teaching there in 1986. He also was visiting professor at University of Minnesota, University of Washington, Seattle, University of Florence, 1956-1957, Harvard University 1962, University of Maine, and University of Paris, Sorbonne, 1977-1978.

Among the Northwestern colleagues with whom he had close friendships were Carl W. Condit, Wallace Douglas, Richard Ellmann, Leon Forrest, Ernest Samuels, Walter Bernard Scott, and Samuel Schoenbaum. Ellmann, a prize-winning biographer, later recalled the "gregarious domesticity" and frequent entertaining of the group. Another colleague recalled Hayford's wife, Josephine, as a "cultured, cosmopolitan, elegant woman," who taught art history at Kendall College, then a junior college nearby in Evanston. The wives, children, and occasionally the men in the group of department and university friends met at the Northwestern beach on summer afternoons, and three times a week the men lunched at Michelini's, an informal Italian diner just off campus. Scott was well-known for his wit and sharp-edged parodies. He supplied drawings for Hayford and Vincent, Reader and Writer, and the two collaborated on satirical projects. Scott's middle name was "Bernard," and Hayford's "Mosher," and the two often used the name "Bernard Mosher" for humorous effect.

The Hayfords had four children: Charles Wishart Hayford (1941- ), Ralph Harrison Hayford (1944- 2002), Alison Margaret Hayford (1946- ), and Deborah Bosworth Hayford (Weiss) (1950 - ).

== Teaching and teaching materials ==
Hayford taught freshman composition, graduate seminars, and undergraduate courses in new areas, such as African American literature, folk-lore, and individual American authors. After the war, he was one of the "young turks" in the English Department who worked to put freshman English at the center of a humanistic curriculum. Along with his Northwestern colleagues Wallace Douglas and Ernest Samuels, he was called one of the “early animators and contributors” to the Conference on College Composition and Communication, formed in 1949.

His 1952 freshman English anthology, Reader and Writer, edited with fellow Melville scholar Howard P. Vincent, became one of the bestselling English composition texts of its time. Selections included essays, short fiction, and poems ranging from the supposed early English poet Bernard Mosher to contemporary writers.

The Somers Mutiny Affair (1959) selected historical documents concerning the 1793 Somers mutiny as a resource for student essays. Commander Alexander Slidell Mackenzie and the mutiny may have been in Melville's mind when he wrote Billy Budd.

Hayford's graduate seminars, recalled a student who became a Melville scholar, revolved around Moby-Dick and the work currently being prepared for the Melville edition. Each student was expected to write an article and submit it for publication.

== Melville revival and influence ==
Hayford's influence in the Melville field came even though he had not written an influential early book that established him as an authority. His student, Hershel Parker, wrote that "he did it his way." He never published his Yale doctoral thesis on the relation between Melville and Hawthorne, but Melville scholars read it in manuscript and it is called "seminal". After resisting pressure to write a Melville biography, Hayford encouraged Leon Howard, then of the Northwestern English Department, to collaborate with Jay Leyda, who was researching his Melville Log, a day-by-day compilation of Melville’s activities. Howard’s 1951 biography was dedicated to Hayford and Leyda.

In 1945, Tyrus Hilway, another student of Stanley Williams, and Hayford founded the Melville Society, for which Hayford served as president four times (1955, 1970, 1992, 1999). The prominent scholar of American literature F.O. Matthiessen disapproved of the idea, recalled Hilway, perhaps because he believed that there were already too many literary societies or that Melville did not merit one.

== Textual editing ==
Literary study in the 1940s was dominated by the New Criticism, an approach that focused on close reading of texts and downplayed or excluded the author's life or historical situation. Hayford later remarked that "Just by looking closely at a piece of writing, they saw a lot of things that nobody else had noticed before. But you take people with PhDs, who are expected to be scholars, and you tell them that they have to find something new -- well, the first 5 may come up with something, but when you have 50 people looking, the text gets used up." These critics also did not often question whether the texts themselves were reliable. The ideal of textual criticism was to establish the author's intention, which might well have been lost when the publisher edited the original manuscript or distorted when the printer set type.

=== Billy Budd ===
Melville left loose pages of the draft manuscript of Billy Budd in disorder on his desk when he died in 1893. Melville's first biographer, Raymond Weaver found these pages among the papers made available to him by Melville's grand-daughter. Weaver produced a text for a collected edition of Melville's works in 1928, but he did not have experience with Melville's difficult handwriting and could only guess at Melville's intentions. Another version published in 1948 reproduced many of Weaver's misreadings and added other mistakes.

In 1955, Hayford and Merton M. Sealts started to study the manuscript, which had been deposited in Harvard's Houghton Library, and published their findings in a 1962 University of Chicago Press book. They found that neither of the two previous editors had realized that Melville's wife had begun to prepare the manuscript for publication, but could not resolve the many difficulties and gave up. The two earlier editors did not recognize that many of the comments were in her handwriting, not her husband's; they printed her queries and notes as if they were Melville's own. Weaver found loose sheets in a separate folder marked "Preface?" and printed them as the Preface. Hayford and Sealts recognized that she had come across the folder and guessed that it was a Preface—hence the question mark. The earlier editors also mistakenly assumed that the pages of the manuscript were in the sequence Melville intended. Hayford and Sealts corrected readings of many words, distinguished the types of papers to show the order in which they were written, observed how Melville's handwriting and writing instruments changed over the years, and noted his use of crayons and inks of different colors. They determined the stages in which Melville developed the plot. To show readers these stages, they prepared a "genetic text" that used a system of markings and symbols to show the history of each leaf, indicate crossings-out and insertions, marginal notes and who made them, and alternative readings. G. Thomas Tanselle called the genetic text an "historic achievement" that made all the textual evidence available for scholars to construct "reading texts." The 1962 University of Chicago volume included both the genetic text and a reading text, which Sealts prepared.

Some reviewers questioned the need for textual editing. They doubted that the earlier published versions needed to be revised, or objected to changing a text they had long been teaching. Princeton University literary historian Lawrance Roger Thompson, for instance, found fault with the “unacceptable attempts to throw out the ‘Preface,’” and suggested that “perhaps Melville put the so-called Preface in a separate folder because he wanted to use it eventually as a ‘Preface’ No other Preface for Billy Budd has been found.” Hershel Parker later countered that “those who felt as if they had been robbed of familiar passages did not particularly care whether or not Melville himself had rejected the passages.... what mattered to them was that as far as they were concerned Billy Budd had always come with a Preface and always should come with a ‘Preface.’”

=== Northwestern-Newberry Melville edition ===
In the 1950s, the Modern Language Association (MLA) established the Center for Editions of American Authors (CEAA), which proposed to organize textual editing and publication projects for major American authors. At about the same time, the eminent literary figure Edmund Wilson and the publisher Jason Epstein, editor at Random House, proposed a series that would do for American authors what the Pléiade Editions did for French authors, that is, publish standard works in well-designed volumes that could be held and read comfortably. They were satisfied to print the text of the first editions of the works they selected. Hayford, who was a consultant for CEAA, applauded Wilson's idea for such a series but insisted that reliable texts must first be established. Interviewed by Lee Sandlin in the Chicago Reader in 1982, Hayford commented that "We pleaded with them to combine the two ideas. We'd do the texts, and they'd publish them. But they wouldn't have anything to do with us." Neither group could win over the other or convince foundations to support them. Hayford and the MLA approached the National Endowment for the Humanities, which agreed to support the CEAA. "These were the Kennedy years," Hayford said later. "They were giving scientists money to shoot at the moon and the scholars money to compare commas."

The Melville project was launched in 1966 with expectations that there would be fifteen volumes and would be completed in a few years. The final volume was not published until 2017.

Hayford brought the Newberry Library and Northwestwestern together as co-sponsors. A basic task was to assemble a collection of Melville editions and research materials. The Newberry's Herman Melville Collection at its height contained more than 6,100 items. The core was Hayford’s personal collection, augmented through purchases and gifts. The collection was enlarged to include at least one copy of every printing of each of Melville's books published in his lifetime, since Melville might possibly have made textual changes, and to accumulate copies of articles and reviews on Melville. When the collection was broken up, many of the contents were transferred to the Melville Society.

Establishing a reliable text was not simple. The first printing of a book might not represent the author's intentions: Melville's handwriting was cramped, misreadings and typographical errors were common, and Melville was impatient with proofreading. In addition, publishers censored or cut many of his early books and Melville made changes and corrections on the page proofs or inserted new material. It was also possible that any edition published during the author's life might have his own corrections or changes. Hayford studied the techniques of textual criticism that bibliographers such as Fredson Bowers had developed to analyze Elizabethan texts. The textual editor was to first chose a "copy text," then compare all other possible texts with it. Punctuation and spelling were known as "accidentals," since they had probably been decided on by the publishing house. Hayford's graduate students and editorial assistants later recalled reading copy-texts aloud word by word, including spelling and punctuation, in order to check against other editions.

The editorial team compared editions using a Hinman collator, a device used by astronomers to discover changes among the stars by comparing successive images. "You can look through a whole text and not find any changes," Hayford said. "But that doesn't mean you've been wasting your time. You've found out a great deal. You found that the text is healthy. Some are absolutely cancerous." Important corrections to accepted texts emerged almost immediately. Moby-Dick, for instance, was printed in London without the last chapter but with other substantive changes that only the author might have made. Correcting even a single word might affect interpretation. The Harvard literary historian F.O. Matthiessen expounded on meaning of the phrase "soiled fish of the sea," a phrase, however, that was a typesetter's misreading of "coiled fish of the sea."

The first volume of the Northwestern-Newberry edition to be published was Typee, which appeared in 1968. Edmund Wilson's "The Fruits of the MLA" reviewed the volume in the New York Review of Books and renewed the attack on the CEAA. Wilson quoted from the CEAA guidelines and wrote that he was "prepared to acknowledge the competence of Mr. Harrison Hayford, Mr. Hershel Parker, and Mr. G. Thomas Taselle [sic] in the stultifying task assigned them," but that they are sometimes as much bored and annoyed as the reviewer is by these exactions; but the project in the case of Typee has been so relentlessley carried out that in the technical language of this species of scholarship—of 'substantives,' 'accidentals,' and 'copy-texts' -- that a glossary should be provided for readers who are not registered union members—if there are any such readers—of the Modern Language Association."

Other reviewers praised the edition's textual scholarship for establishing reliable texts. Some questioned particular decisions behind the reading texts, however. Julian Markels, writing in the journal American Literature charged that Hayford and Sealts had been wrong to remove the "Preface" from Billy Budd. He also charged that Hayford used his position as General Editor to push his thesis that Moby-Dick contained "unnecessary duplicates" and that he excluded other interpretations. Robert Milder, reviewing several volumes published in the mid-1990s, remarked that the ratio of material in the appendices in the earlier volumes was roughly two to one, but that the Northwestern-Newberry editors had greatly expanded the material in the historical and critical appendices in the recent volumes. The edition "quite simply reinvented itself and in so doing redefined what a scholarly volume can and perhaps ought to be." Milder cautioned, however, "no firm and abiding principle governs the inclusion or exclusion of material."

Northwestern-Newberry texts soon were accepted as standard and widely reprinted. Because the National Endowment for the Humanities funded the project, the texts were not copyright, and there was no fee to reprint them. Edmund Wilson and Jason Epstein's vision came to fruition in the Library of America. The first volume in the series was devoted to Melville, edited by G. Thomas Tanselle, and Hayford edited a later volume. The texts were those established by the Northwestern- Newberry editions.

== Literary history and criticism ==
After his death in 2001, Northwestern University Press published a collection of Hayford's selected and revised essays, Melville's Prisoners (2003), with an extensive introduction by Hershel Parker. John Bryant's review in Leviathan notes that it contains both "scholarly-critical essays," in which textual history and bibliographical facts shape and inform critical insight, but also explication de texte, source study, and biography.

== Book collecting ==
Hayford was also known to friends and students as a book-lover and collector. His essay "An Apology for Book Accumulating," however, argued that "collectors" buy mainly in defined categories, but there was value in accumulating books without narrowing the reasons. He defended a collection of Twentieth Century Second Rate Fiction on the grounds that bad literature was also part of the record.

One former student estimated that some 200,000 volumes must have passed through Hayford's house over the course of his career, also filling his attic, basement, and garage. He had been buying books by and about Melville and other figures in American literature, but once he began work on the Melville project in 1965, he donated his Melville items to the Newberry and bought Melville books only for the Newberry Melville collection. He then began forming what biblikographer Thomas Tanselle called "impressive assemblages of American poetry, fiction, and humor, and books by American women and blacks." His house was, Tanselle continued, "in some respects the best bookshop in the Chicago area." Although he was generous in giving books to graduate students, he sold or donated from this stock only to college or university libraries in thematic groups, such as American fiction, humor, and poetry. He devoted special attention to areas that were then less developed, such as writings by women and African Americans, in order to encourage research. In addition to the Newberry Library, large collections went to Purdue University, Western Michigan University, University of Toledo, and Meiji University in Tokyo.

In 1990, he and his wife donated "The Josephine Long Wishart Collection: Mother, Home, and Heaven," a collection of more than 800 books by and about American women, to Wooster College to provide research material for the college's undergraduate research program. The collection honors Josephine Long Wishart, his wife's mother and wife of former Wooster president Charles F. Wishart. Topics range from cooking and cleaning to marriage and birth control,

== Selected publications ==
=== Textual editions ===
- ——; Sealts, Merton M. (1962), Billy Budd, Sailor (an inside Narrative) Reading Text and Genetic Text, Chicago: University of Chicago Press
- —— (1968), The Writings of Herman Melville, Hershel Parker and G. Thomas Tanselle, Evanston, Ill.: Northwestern University Press
- —— (1969). The Journals and Miscellaneous Notebooks of Ralph Waldo Emerson. Vol. 7: 1838-1842. with William Henry Gilman, Arthur William Plumstead. Cambridge, Mass.; London: Belknap Press of Harvard University Press. ISBN 978-0674484573.
- Melville, Herman, edited and with an Introduction by Harrison Hayford,Omoo; a Narrative of Adventures in the South Seas. (New York: Hendricks House, 1969).
- —— (1979), Typee : A Peep at Polynesian Life During a Four Months' Residence in a Valley of the Marquesas, New York N.Y.: Penguin, ISBN 978-0451525185

=== Teaching and textbooks ===
- ——; with Vincent, Howard Paton (1952), Reader and Writer, Boston: Houghton Mifflin Internet Archive HERE
- ——, ed. (1959). The Somers Mutiny Affair. Englewood Cliffs, N.J: Prentice - Hall.
- —— (1962), Classic American Writers; a Basic Selection, Boston: Little, Brown Available free online HERE
- Parker, Hershel; ——, eds. (1970), Moby-Dick as Doubloon : Essays and Extracts (1851-1970), New York: W. W. Norton & Company
- —— (1994), Moby-Dick: An Authoritative Text Reviews and Letters by Melville Analogues and Sources Criticism, with Hershel Parker, eds., New York: Norton, ISBN 978-0393096705

=== Books and articles ===
† = reprinted (and revised) in Melville's Prisoners (2003).

- —— (1940). Society in American Poetry: A Study of the Relation of Social Themes to Religious Values (Masters thesis). Medford, MA: Tufts.
- —— (1944). "Two New Letters of Herman Melville". ELH. 11 (1): 76–83. doi:10.2307/2871746. JSTOR 2871746.
- —— (1946). "Hawthorne, Melville, and the Sea". New England Quarterly. 19 (4): 435–452. doi:10.2307/361227. JSTOR 361227.
- —— (1946). "The Significance of Melville's "Agatha" Letters". ELH. 13 (4): 299–310. doi:10.2307/2871451. JSTOR 2871451.
- ——; Davis, Merrell R. (1949). "Herman Melville as Office-Seeker". Modern Language Quarterly. 10 (2): 168–183. doi:10.1215/00267929-10-2-168.
- —— (1952). "Leon Howard's "Herman Melville"". Nineteenth-Century Fiction. 7 (1): 61–67. doi:10.2307/3044138. JSTOR 3044138.
- —— (1951). "(Review) Herman Melville, A Critical Study. by Richard Chase". Modern Language Notes. 66 (2): 129–131. doi:10.2307/2909098. JSTOR 2909098.
- † —— (1958). "Melville's Freudian Slip". American Literature: 366–368.
- † —— (1959). "Poe in the Confidence-Man". Nineteenth-Century Fiction. 14 (3): 207–218. doi:10.2307/3044241. JSTOR 3044241.
- † —— (1975). ""Loomings": Yarns and Figures in the Fabric". In DeMott, Robert J.; Marovitz, Sanford E. (eds.). Artful Thunder : Versions of the Romantic Tradition in American Literature, in Honor of Howard P. Vincent. Kent, Ohio: Kent State University Press. ISBN 978-0873381727.
- † —— (1978). "Unnecessary Duplicates: A Key to the Writing of Moby-Dick". In Pullin, Faith (ed.). New Perspectives on Melville. Edinburgh University Press.
- † —— (1990). Melville's "Monody" : Really for Hawthorne?. Evanston, Ill.: Northwestern University Press.
- —— (2003). Melville's Prisoners. With a foreword by Hershel Parker. Evanston, Ill.: Northwestern University Press. ISBN 978-0810119734.. In addition to the essays marked above, includes "Is Moby-Dick a Botch?"; "An Apology for Book Accumulation"; "Melville's Imaginary Sister".
- Hayford, Josephine Wishart; ——; Wishart, Josephine Long. Josephine Long Wishart Collection: Mother, Home, and Heaven.
