= School the World =

- Formation: 2009
- Founder: Kate Curran
- Type: Nonprofit organization
- Purpose: Education
- Headquarters: Boston, Massachusetts, United States
- Region served: Guatemala; Honduras; Panama; Philippines
- Website: https://schooltheworld.org

School the World is an American nonprofit organization that supports education projects in rural communities in Guatemala, Honduras, Panama, and the Philippines.

== Overview ==
School the World was founded as a non-profit in 2009 and is based in Boston, Massachusetts. It was founded by lawyer Kate Curran.

The organization partners with local governments and community groups to build or repair primary schools and provide education support such as classroom/library books, teacher training, and parent workshops.

It first became active in Guatemala and later expanded to Honduras and Panama. In 2025, it began working in the Philippines.

In 2013, School the World introduced a service learning program in which high school students and corporate volunteers took part in week-long trips to support classroom and playground construction work in the communities where the organization runs projects.

By 2017, School the World reported supporting 45 school construction or reconstruction projects, training 266 teachers, providing 13,097 books, training 2,993 parents, and serving 5,457 enrolled students.

== Awards and recognitions ==
In 2024, the Library of Congress named School the World a Successful Practices Honoree in its Literacy Awards program. School the World's accelerated learning program was selected for the HundrED Global Collection of education innovations in 2024, 2025, and 2026.
