= Perception training =

Recognising one's surroundings through stimuli exposure

Perception training is the act of using constant exposure to surrounding stimuli in order to recognize and identify one's surroundings. This psychological method is often considered in the context of children's development.

Complex perceptions like voice recognition is a type of sequence that needs continuous exposure which can be trained or learned. Complex perceptions are often multi-sensory perceptions. An example of these perceptions is: To distinguish between what is real versus what is fake such as using your senses of taste, smell, and touch because visual inspection may be insufficient.

Similarly, complex perception are in relation to stimulus and episodic memory. Episodic memory is the recollection(remembrance) of information from specific experiences in a particular point in time. For example, a time when episodic memory occurs is in times like remembering where you parked your car or the clothes you had on yesterday. This example can also cause the mind to view things in a different perspective. These are called ambiguous figures. Ambiguous figures are a type of visual stimulus that can make people intercept objects or pictures in one way or more. An example could be seeing a photo of a goblet while also you can see two faces in the same photo. So, the perception can change but the visual stays the same.

The basic approaches of perception training are similar to problem solving. The perception stimulus means that there needs to be constant exposure, not just when it is convenient. Like going over an exam review, you need to be constantly going over the notes and lectures to get a good understanding.
