= Melville Society =

Organization for the study of Herman Melville

The Melville Society is an organization for the study of author Herman Melville. Founded in 1945, the Society grew out of the Melville Revival of the 1920s and 1930s and is now the oldest American society devoted to a single literary figure.

Its primary publication is Leviathan: A Journal of Melville Studies, issued three times per year. The society has formed a cultural project in collaboration with the New Bedford Whaling Museum, the host of the Melville Society Archive, and has an editorial office at Hofstra University. It meets primarily at the American Literature Association and Modern Language Association annual conferences and has also held international meetings. It has approximately 400 members, comprising both individuals and institutions.

== Founding and history ==
The society was founded in February 1945 by Harrison Hayford and Tyrus Hillway. Both had done doctoral study in American literature at Yale with Stanley Williams. The membership of the new society included both academics and literary intellectuals in the Melville Revival of the 1920s and 1930s and from university graduate programs that in the late 1930s began to train scholars in American literature.

The Society overcame some initial skepticism. Hilway's editorial in the 1947 Melville Society Newsletter reported that critics "were willing to believe that the so-called Melville boom represented a temporary and esoteric enthusiasm for a fifth-rate literary figure...." He said that, to the contrary, the Society can reassure itself of its part in "virile and outreaching growth of Melville scholarship".

== Officers and presidents ==
Among the presidents were Willard Thorp (1952), Merton Sealts (1953), Harrison Hayford (1955, 1970), (1992), (1999), Richard H. Fogle, (1961), Henry A. Murray (1966) (1980), Walter Bezanson (1967) (1989), Leon Howard (1971), Robert Penn Warren (1974), Jay Leyda (1976) (1987), Lewis Mumford (1977), G. Thomas Tanselle (1982), Hershel Parker (1991), H. Bruce Franklin (1993), Andrew Delbanco (2007).
