= G. Thomas Tanselle =

American bibliographer (born 1934)

George Thomas Tanselle (born January 29, 1934) is an American textual critic, bibliographer, and book collector, especially known for his work on Herman Melville. He was Vice President of the John Simon Guggenheim Foundation from 1978 to 2006.

== Biography ==
George Thomas Tanselle was born on January 29, 1934, in Lebanon, Indiana. He received a bachelor's degree from Yale University in 1955. Tanselle attended graduate school at Northwestern University where he studied with Harrison Hayford among others. He received his PhD in 1959 from the department of English where his dissertation was titled Faun at the Barricades: The Life and Work of Floyd Dell.

From 1960 through 1978 he taught at the University of Wisconsin. After moving to New York City in 1978, he served as vice president of the John Simon Guggenheim Memorial Foundation until 2006.

He was an adjunct professor of English at Columbia University, and co-editor of the Northwestern-Newberry Edition of the writings of Herman Melville.

Tanselle was President of the Bibliographical Society of America from 1985 to 1988. He was president of the Bibliographical Society of the University of Virginia 1993–2006. He is also a member of the board of directors and textual consultant of the Library of America. He was president of the Grolier Club, the pre-eminent American society of bibliophiles, from 1986 to 1990.

Tanselle held fellowships from the John Simon Guggenheim Memorial Foundation (1969–70), American Council of Learned Societies (1973–74), and the National Endowment for the Humanities (1977–78).

In 1996-1997 he was Sandars Reader in Bibliography at the University of Cambridge lecturing on "Analytical bibliography: an historical introduction."

He was the Rosenbach Fellow in Bibliography in 1987 at the University of Pennsylvania. His lectures were published in 1989 as A Rationale of Textual Criticism by the University of Pennsylvania Press.

== Theories of textual editing and influence ==
Tanselle absorbed the principles of Walter W. Greg and Fredson Bowers, who developed the theory of textual criticism, a branch of textual scholarship, philology, and literary criticism that is concerned with the identification and removal of transcription errors in texts, both manuscripts and printed books, in order to create a text which most closely reflects the author's intent. He has been called the "most prominent, consistent, and authoritative defender of the Greg-Bowers approach to editing," which was described in 1991 as "the dominant theoretical and practical position in Anglo-American editing." Tanselle has sought to accommodate legitimate critiques of its limitations, such as the insistence on the difference between substantive and accidentals, that is, the difference between the words and their spelling and punctuation. Tanselle, says one scholar, like Greg and Bowers, postulates the notion of an "ideal 'correct' text, measured against which extant texts show various degrees of 'corruption' that the editor seeks to remove." Tanselle follows this tradition more flexibly, but still comes to rest on the "principle of the author's final intention," which the "editor (or critic) seeks first to understand and then to implement..." This position is opposed to the New Criticism, which rejects the author's intent, since the author's intentions are not relevant specifically by themselves, taken solely, for an artistic work, or "piece of art", once it is finished.

He then applied these principles to the study of American literature. He was particularly active as textual editor for the Northwestern-Newberry edition of the works of Herman Melville to make a critical edition, as approved by The Center for Scholarly Editions.

== Major publications ==
Books

- —— (1967). Royall Tyler. Cambridge: Harvard University Press.
- Hayford, Harrison; Hershel Parker; G. Thomas Tanselle, eds. (1968). The Writings of Herman Melville. Evanston, Ill.: Northwestern University Press.
- —— (1971). Guide to the Study of United States Imprints. Cambridge, Mass.: Belknap Press of Harvard University Press. ISBN 0-674-36761-8.
- ——; Newberry Library. (1976). A Checklist of Editions of Moby-Dick, 1851-1976: Issued on the Occasion of an Exhibition at the Newberry Library Commemorating the 125th Anniversary of Its Original Publication. Evanston; Chicago: Northwestern University Press; Newberry Library.
- —— (1977). The Editing of Historical Documents. Charlottesville, Va.: Published for the Bibliographical Society of the University of Virginia by the University Press of Virginia. ISBN 0-8139-0804-3.
- —— (1979). Selected Studies in Bibliography. Charlottesville: Published for the Bibliographical Society of the University of Virginia by the University Press of Virginia. ISBN 0-8139-0829-9.
- —— (1981). The History of Books as a Field of Study: A Paper. Chapel Hill, N.C.: Hanes Foundation, Rare Book Collection/Academy Affairs Library, University of North Carolina at Chapel Hill.
- —— (1990). Textual Criticism and Scholarly Editing. Charlottesville: Published for the Bibliographical Society of the University of Virginia by the University Press of Virginia. ISBN 0-8139-1303-9.
- Sallust (1993). David L. Vander Meulen; G. Thomas Tanselle (eds.). Samuel Johnson's Translation of Sallust: A Facsimile and Transcription of the Hyde Manuscript. Translated by Samuel Johnson. New York Charlottesville: Johnsonians; Bibliographical Society of the University of Virginia.
- —— (1993). The Life and Work of Fredson Bowers. Charlottesville: Bibliographical Society of the University of Virginia. ISBN 1-883631-00-9.
- —— (1997). Preface. The Middle Hill Press: A Checklist of the Horblit Collection of Books, Tracts, Leaflets, and Broadsides Printed by Sir Thomas Phillipps at His Press at Middle Hill, or Elsewhere to His Order, Now in the Library of the Grolier Club. By Holzenberg, Eric. New York: The Grolier Club. ISBN 0-910672-20-2.
- —— (1998). Literature and Artifacts. Charlottesville: Bibliographical Society of the University of Virginia. ISBN 1-883631-06-8.
- Tanselle, G. Thomas; Peter Franklin Kardon; Eunice R. Schwager (2001). The John Simon Guggenheim Memorial Foundation, 1925-2000: A Seventy-Fifth Anniversary Record. New York: John Simon Guggenheim Memorial Foundation.
- —— (2003). Textual Criticism and Scholarly Editing. Charlottesville: Bibliographical Society of the University of Virginia. ISBN 1-883631-09-2.
- Ray, Gordon Norton; G. Thomas Tanselle (2005). The Art Deco Book in France. Charlottesville New Castle, Del.: Bibliographical Society of the University of Virginia; Distributed by Oak Knoll Books. ISBN 978-1-883631-12-3.
- —— (2006). The Pleasures of Being a Scholar-Collector. New York: Grolier Club. ISBN 0-910672-66-0.
- —— (2009). Bibliographical Analysis: A Historical Introduction. Cambridge; New York: Cambridge University Press. ISBN 978-0-521-76034-8.
- —— (2011). Book-Jackets: Their History, Forms, and Use. Charlottesville; New Castle, Del.: Bibliographical Society of the University of Virginia; Oak Knoll Books. ISBN 978-1-883631-13-0.
- Tanselle, G. Thomas; Hal Kugeler (2011). Other People's Books: Association Copies and the Stories They Tell. Chicago: Caxton Club. ISBN 978-0-940550-10-0.
- —— (2013). Essays in Bibliographical History. Charlottesville: Bibliographical Society of the University of Virginia. ISBN 978-1-883631-14-7.
- (2015). Portraits and Reviews. Charlottesville: The Bibliographical Society of the University of Virginia.
- —— (2020). Descriptive Bibliography. Charlottesville; New Castle, Del.: Bibliographical Society of the University of Virginia; Oak Knoll Books. ISBN 978-1-883631-19-2.
- Tanselle, G. Thomas. 2021. Books in My Life. Edited by David L. Vander Meulen. Charlottesville: The Bibliographical Society of the University of Virginia.

Selected articles

- —— (1972). "Some Principles for Editorial Apparatus". Studies in Bibliography. 25: 41–88. Archived from the original on 2013-09-12.
- —— (1975). "Greg's Theory of Copy-Text and the Editing of American Literature". Studies in Bibliography. 28: 167–230.
- —— (1976). "The Editorial Problem of Final Authorial Intention". Studies in Bibliography. 29: 167–211.
- —— (1981). "Recent Editorial Discussion and the Central Questions of Editing". Studies in Bibliography. 34: 23–65.
- —— (1986). "Historicism and Critical Editing". Studies in Bibliography. 39: 1–46.
- —— (1995). "The Varieties of Scholarly Editing". In D. C. Greetham (ed.). Scholarly Editing: A Guide to Research. New York: The Modern Language Association of America.
- —— (2003). “Fifty Years On: Bibliography Then and Now.” The Book Collector 52 (4). Winter: 459–70.
- —— (2003). "Dust-Jackets, Dealers, and Documentation." Studies in Bibliography (Charlottesville, Va.) 56, no. 1 (2003): 45–140.

== References and further reading ==
- Bornstein, George (1991). Representing Modernist Texts: Editing as Interpretation. Ann Arbor: University of Michigan Press. ISBN 0-472-09439-4.
- Bryant, John. "Editing Versions: Historicism, Biography, and the Digital in Tanselle's Descriptive Bibliography." Textual Cultures : Text, Contexts, Interpretation 14, no. 2 (2022).
- Groden, Michael (1991), "Contemporary textual and literary theory", in Bornstein, George (ed.), Representing Modernist Texts: Editing as Interpretation, Ann Arbor: University of Michigan Press, ISBN 0-472-09439-4
