= Charlton Hinman =

20th-century American academic and Shakespeare scholar

Charlton Joseph Kadio Hinman (1911 in Fort Collins, Colorado – 16 March 1977 in Rockville, Maryland) was the editor of the Shakespeare Quarto Facsimiles and The Norton Facsimile: The First Folio of Shakespeare. He is well known as the inventor of the Hinman Collator.

Hinman attended the University of Oxford as a Rhodes scholar, receiving both his bachelor's and master's degrees there. He later received his doctoral degree in 1941 from the University of Virginia, as Fredson Bowers' first Ph.D. candidate. He was associated with the Folger Shakespeare Library and was professor of English at the University of Kansas from 1960 to 1976.

== Sources ==
- Gregory, Dan (July–August 2008). "Devil in the Details". Fine Books & Collections.
- Smith, Steven Escar (2000). "'The Eternal Verities Verified': Charlton Hinman and the Roots of Mechanical Collation". Studies in Bibliography. 53. Bibliographical Society of the University of Virginia: 129–61. ISSN 0081-7600. JSTOR 40372096.
- "Charlton Hinman Dies, Shakespearean Scholar". The Washington Post. 18 March 1977.
