= Redmond Kathleen Molz =

Professor, author, librarian and editor

- Born: 1928
- Died: 2019 (aged 90–91)
- Education: Johns Hopkins University, Columbia University
- Occupations: Scholar, librarian

Redmond Kathleen Molz (March 5, 1928 – October 8, 2019) was a professor, author, librarian and editor. Her focus was the role of libraries in society, particularly in the context of public policy, education, and the information age.

Her book, Federal Policy and Library Support, was an analysis of federal funding priorities and legislative programs supporting libraries.

== Education and career ==
Molz earned the BA and MA from Johns Hopkins University, a Master of Arts in Liberal Studies from the University of Michigan, and Doctor of Library Science (DLS) from Columbia University (1976).

She was a librarian at the Enoch Pratt Free Library in Baltimore (1953–1956), and public relations officer at the Free Library of Philadelphia (1958–1962).

She was editor of the Wilson Library Bulletin (1962–1968).

In 1968 she became was chief of the planning staff for the Bureau of Libraries and Learning Resources at the U.S. Office of Education in Washington, D.C., a position she held until 1973. She worked with the National Commission on Libraries and Information Science on the White House Conference on Libraries and Information Services.

In 1976 Molz was appointed as professor at the School of Library Service at Columbia University. She held the Melvil Dewey professorship, the first endowed chair of librarianship in an American university, established by Columbia in 1938 with an endowment fund from the Carnegie Corporation of New York.

She presented the 1988 Engelhard Lecture at the Center for the Book at the Library of Congress.

When the School of Library Service closed in 1992 Molz was appointed professor of public affairs at the School of International and Public Affairs, Columbia University, a position she held from 1993–1999. She retired as professor emerita in 2000.

Molz was an active member of the American Library Association where she served on the Executive Board and chaired the Intellectual Freedom committee. She was president of the Freedom to Read Foundation in 1977–79. She was chair of the legislation committee in 1985–1986. Redmond Kathleen Molz died on October 8, 2019.

== Selected publications ==
- Molz, Redmond Kathleen; Dain, Phyllis (1999). Civic Space/Cyberspace : The American Public Library in the Information Age. Cambridge, MA: MIT Press. ISBN 9780262280105.
- Molz, Redmond Kathleen (1991). The Federal Roles in Support of Academic and Research Libraries. Chicago: American Library Association. ISBN 9780838933930.
- Molz, Redmond Kathleen (1984). National Planning for Library Service, 1935-1975. Chicago: American Library Association. ISBN 9780838904220.
- Molz, Redmond Kathleen (1979). Library and Information Services for Enhancing Lifelong Learning. Washington DC: National Commission on Libraries and Information Science. OCLC 5885625.
- Molz, Redmond Kathleen (1976). Federal Policy and Library Support. Cambridge, MA: MIT Press. ISBN 9780262131209.
- Molz, Redmond Kathleen (1974). Reaching out: Some USOE-Funded Programs and Projects That Illustrate the Efforts of Public Libraries to Attract New Clientele. Washington DC: U.S. Department of Health, Education and Welfare, Office of Education. OCLC 3086412.
- Molz, Redmond Kathleen (1973). Libraries and the Right to Read : A Summary of USOE-Funded Programs and Projects Illustrative of the Library’s Concern for the National Right to Read Effort. Washington DC: U.S. Department of Health, Education, and Welfare, Education Division, Office of Education. OCLC 1266048.
- Conant, Ralph W.; Molz, Redmond Kathleen, eds. (1972). The Metropolitan Library. Cambridge, MA: MIT Press. ISBN 9780262030410.
