= Bibliographical Society of the University of Virginia =

American learned society

Bibliographical Society of the University of Virginia is a learned society founded in 1947 at the University of Virginia, Charlottesville to promote interest in books and manuscripts, maps, printing, the graphic arts, and bibliography and textual criticism. The society sponsors exhibitions, contests for student book collectors and Virginia printers, an international speakers’ series, and an active publications program which has produced over 175 separate publications in addition to its journal Studies in Bibliography.

The society was led for many years by Fredson Bowers, a University of Virginia faculty member, and was influential in applying and spreading the theories of textual criticism developed by Bowers and W. W. Greg which brought about changes in the study of manuscripts and the printing of books to ascertain the original intentions of authors.

== History ==
After several years of preparation, on February 26, 1947 a group met in the University of Virginia library in Charlottesville and adopted a constitution that declared the object of their new society to be "to foster an interest in books (including books in manuscript), maps, printing, and bibliography." The group called "The Bibliographical Society of the University of Virginia." The inaugural address was given by Fredson Bowers, a member of the faculty, speaking on "Some Problems and Practices in Bibliographical Descriptions of Modern Authors," The leadership in the early years fell to Bowers, to John Cook Wyllie, and to Linton Massey. Bowers served as President in the Society's second and third years, 1948 and 1949, and then from its fifth year, 1951, up to 1974. By the late 1960s, the Society had nearly 1,000 members. Irby Cauthen, a charter member, became President in 1978. He was succeeded in 1993 by G. Thomas Tanselle, who was elected a Council member and President in 1993, only the second Council member from outside Charlottesville. Tanselle served as president of the society 1993-2006.

== Studies in Bibliography and other publications ==
The Papers of the Bibliographical Society of the University of Virginia was started in 1948 as an annual journal dedicated to the study of books as physical objects and to textual criticism and scholarly editing; Bowers served as the journal's editor until his death in 1991. It was renamed Studies in Bibliography for volume 2. Bowers conceived of the journal as one that encompassed all bibliographical study, with no restriction as to the geographical origins or periods or genres of the material examined. The topics of articles in Volume I (1948-1949), for instance, ranged from an unpublished manuscript by Thomas Jefferson, Elizabethan drama, and the use of watermarks as bibliographical evidence to catalogs issued by 16th century booksellers. Volume III (1950) opened with four major essays on textual matters: R. C. Bald's "Editorial Problems--A Preliminary Survey," W. W. Greg's "The Rationale of Copy-Text," Bowers's "Some Relations of Bibliography to Editorial Problems," and Archibald A. Hill's "Some Postulates for Distributional Study of Texts." G. Thomas Tanselle called Greg's article "one of the most seminal papers in the history of English scholarship." Articles in later issues also discussed new technology, such as the Hinman collator, which used lenses and mirrors to compare copies of a printed work in order to show the differences. Bowers promoted this technique for early printed works, such as the First Folios of Shakespeare.

Book length publications range from bibliographies of contemporary authors such as Peter Taylor and H.D., to studies of Shakespearean promptbooks, with an especially large number of works on the problems and theory of textual editing, including collections of essays by Bowers and Tanselle.

In 1991, editorship of Studies in Bibliography passed to David L. Vander Meulen, a professor of English at the University of Virginia.
