= Visual comparison =

Comparing objects by eye

A visual comparison is to compare two or more things by eye. This might be done by placing them side by side; by overlaying them; by alternating an image or by presenting each image to a separate eye.

Such comparisons are the first stage in a child's development of an understanding of geometry and measurement, before they move to an understanding of measuring devices such as a ruler.

People with sufficient control over the parallax of their eyeballs (e.g. those who can easily view random-dot stereograms) can hold up two paper printouts and go cross-eyed to superimpose them. This invokes deep, fast, built-in image comparison wetware (the same machinery responsible for depth perception) and differences stand out almost immediately. This technique is good for finding edits in graphical images, or for comparing an image with a compressed version to spot artefacts.

Visual comparison with a standard chart or reference is often used as a means of measuring complex phenomena such as the weather, sea states or the roughness of a river. A colour chart is used for this purpose in many contexts such as chemistry, cosmetics, medical testing and photography.

Comparison by eye may also be used as a source of amusement or intelligence testing, as in the popular puzzle of spot the difference.

In policing, the technique is used for analysis of fingerprints and identity parades.

Visual comparison task can be simplified by using a computer software that automatically aligns a pair of images based on common visual features present in the two images.

== Computer jargon ==
A visual diff or vdiff finds differences between two files by eyeball search. The term optical diff has also been reported, and is sometimes more specifically used for the act of superimposing two nearly identical printouts on one another and holding them up to a light to spot differences. Though this method is poor for detecting omissions in the ‘rear’ file, it can also be used with printouts of graphics, a claim few diff programs can make.

== See also ==
- Beaufort scale
- Blink comparator
- Hinman collator
- Image differencing
- Visual inspection
- Visual search
