= Leviathan (journal) =

Leviathan: A Journal of Melville Studies
- Discipline: American literature, Melville studies
- Language: English
- Edited by: Jennifer Greiman

Publication details
- History: 1999–present
- Publisher: Johns Hopkins University Press (on behalf of the Melville Society) (United States)
- Frequency: 3/year

Standard abbreviations
- ISO 4: Leviathan

Indexing
- ISSN: 1525-6995 (print); 1750-1849 (web)

Links
- Journal homepage

Leviathan: A Journal of Melville Studies is a peer-reviewed academic journal on the American author Herman Melville. It is the flagship publication of the Melville Society and has been published three times a year since its first issue in March 1999. The journal is indexed in the Arts and Humanities Citation Index and Scopus, and is distributed online through Project MUSE.

== History ==
The journal was originally published by Hofstra University before moving to Blackwell Publishing in 2006 and Johns Hopkins University Press since 2014. Editors of Leviathan have included John Bryant (founding editor, 1999–2013), Samuel Otter (2014–2019), Brian Yothers (2019/2020–2025), and Jennifer Greiman (2025–present).

== See also ==
- Melville Society
- Herman Melville
