= Carl Pulfrich =

German physicist

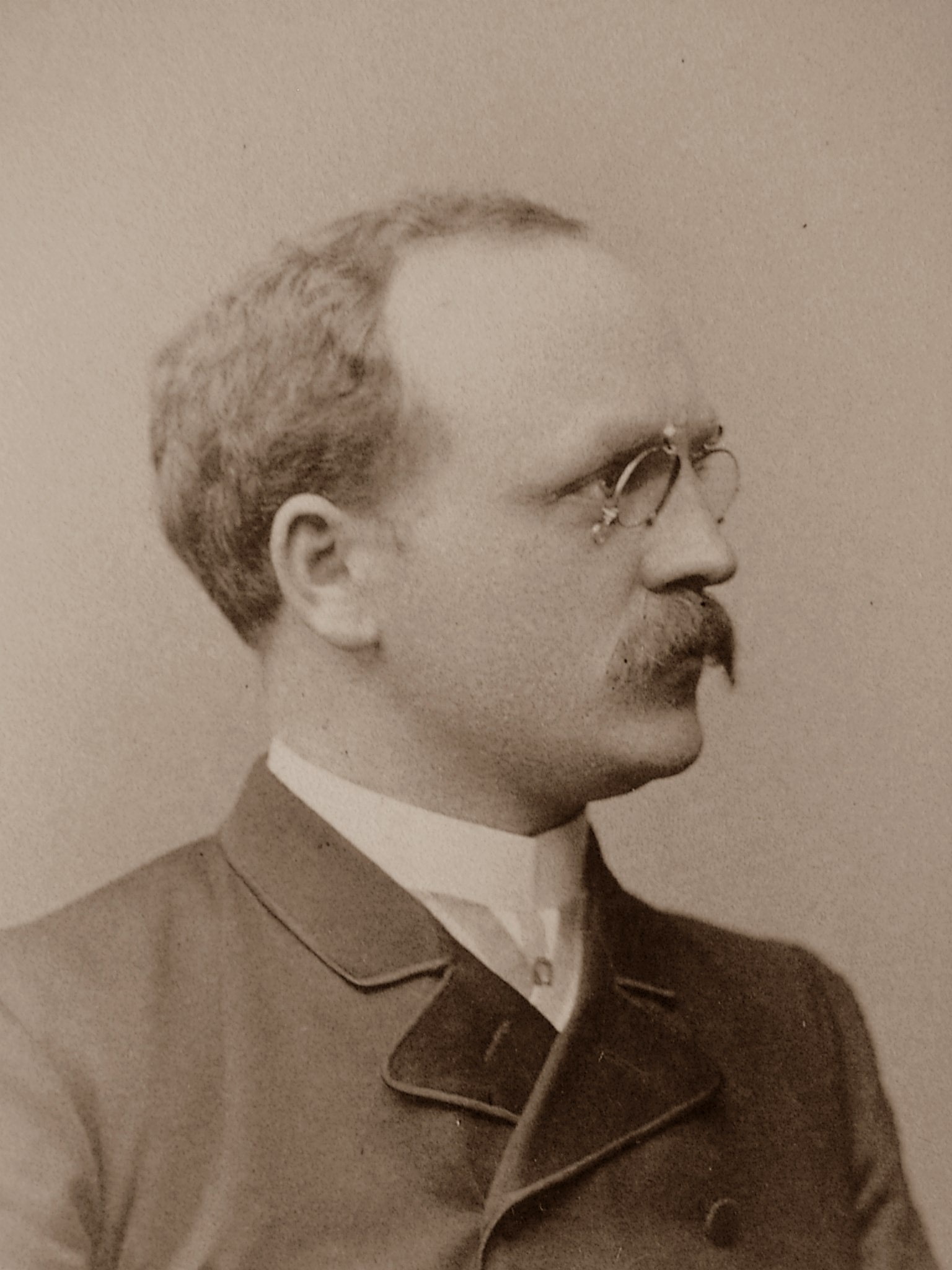
Pulfrich in 1889

Carl P. Pulfrich (September 24, 1858 in Burscheid, Rhine Province, Kingdom of Prussia – August 12, 1927 in Baltic Sea, drowned when his canoe capsized) was a German physicist, noted for advancements in optics made as a researcher for the Carl Zeiss company in Jena around 1880, and for documenting the Pulfrich effect, a psycho-optical phenomenon that can be used to create a type of 3-D visual effect. Carl Pulfrich was the brother-in-law of Heinrich Hertz.

== Advances in optics ==
Pulfrich was employed to develop stereoscopy from being pure entertainment to a powerful quantitative technique. His apparatus to measure distances stereoscopically was first presented in Munich in 1899. This was further developed to a stereo-comparator which was presented in Hamburg in 1901. Stereoscopy was used for topographic mapping, astronomy and oceanography because it enabled the measurement of elevation by simple trigonometry. He pioneered the use of aerial photography surveys.

He introduced in 1909 a "Vacation Course in Stereophotogrammetry", that gave rise to the annual "Photogrammetry Week" running for more than a century. Leica Geosystems sponsors the "Carl Pulfrich Award", to honour advancements in the fields of photogrammetry, remote sensing, and earth imaging.

Pulfrich had realised that people in whom visual function differed between both eyes perceived the stereo-effect:

“Gibt es doch, wie sich jetzt herausgestellt hat, Personen, die auch im freien Sehen das Kreisen der Marke sehen, links oder rechts herum, je nachdem bei dem betreffenden Beobachter das linke oder das rechte Auge schneller reagiert als das andere. In solchen für den Augenarzt besonders beachtenswerten Fällen konnte jedesmal eine mehr oder weniger grosse, durch einseitigen Gebrauch oder andere Ursachen erworbene Ungleicheit der beiden Augen nachgewiesen werden.”
[There are, as we have found out, people who can perceive the circulation of the pointer without using a neutral density filter. The left- or rightward movement depends on whether the observer’s left or right eye reacts quicker than the other. In these cases, relevant to the ophthalmologist it was always possible to demonstrate a difference between the two eyes, due to unilateral use (Translator’s remark: Pulfrich refers to amblyopia) or other causes.]

Pulfrich's comment implies a list of diseases in which the stereo-effect can occur. He wondered why the stereo-effect was not noted earlier because of the abundance of swinging clock pendulums:

“Wenn man bedenkt mit welch einfachen Mitteln die Erscheinung der kreisenden Marke hervorgerufen werden kann, so kann man sich nur darüber wundern, dass sie anscheinend nicht schon früher einmal beobachtet worden ist, wozu doch jeder Uhrenladen die Gelegenheit bietet.”
[If one considers the simple means used to produce the phenomenon of the circulating pointer, one wonders why this observation has not been made earlier, particularly as every shop selling clocks offers this opportunity.]

— Carl P. Pulfrich

== Pulfrich refractometer ==
A Pulfrich refractometer measures refractive index of a sample by measuring the critical angle of the sample with a well characterized prism. Pulfrich and Max Wolz invented it at the Zeiss factory.

== See also ==
- Blink comparator
- Hinman collator
