= Wilson Library Bulletin =

Professional magazine for librarians published 1914–1995

- Categories: Librarianship
- Publisher: H. W. Wilson Company
- First issue: 1914
- Final issue: 1995
- Country: United States
- Language: English
- ISSN: 0043-5651

The Wilson Library Bulletin was a professional American magazine published for librarians from 1914 to 1995 by the H. W. Wilson Company, Bronx. NY. It began as The Wilson Bulletin and published occasionally. In its first volume were discussions about the library being as necessary to a high school as the gymnasium, and an article by Corinne Bacon on "What Makes a Novel Immoral?"

In November 1928, its name became The Wilson Bulletin: A Magazine for Librarians. Two years later it was renamed Wilson Bulletin for Librarians and in September 1939 the name changed again to Wilson Library Bulletin (WLB), the name by which it was known until it ceased publication in June 1995.

WLB was noted for its beautiful covers (often photographs or original art); its publication of library-related cartoons; and its broad scope, covering the whole of librarianship. In its last decade of publication it became the first library periodical to carry a regular column about the internet (The Internet Cafe, written by Lee Ratzan), to include email addresses of contributors, and to explore the intersection of librarianship and online resources.

Its first editor was Edith M. Phelps. Its second was the poet Stanley Kunitz, and others included Howard Haycraft, Marie Loizeaux, Redmond Kathleen Molz, Milo Nelson, Mary Jo Godwin, GraceAnne A. DeCandido and William Robert Eshelman (1968–1978).

== Controversy ==
In 1992, the American Library Association's Social Responsibilities Round Table issued a resolution calling for a boycott of the Wilson Library Bulletin due to its dismissal of contributor Will Manley. Manley's column in the June 1992 issue contained a "Librarians and Sex" questionnaire, which "displeased the H.W. Wilson Company President."
