= Super Bowl XXIII halftime show =

1989 show in Miami, Florida

- Part of: Super Bowl XXIII
- Date: January 22, 1989
- Location: Miami, Florida
- Venue: Joe Robbie Stadium
- Theme: BeBop Bamboozled in 3-D
- Sponsor: Diet Coke
- Director: Dan Witkowski
- Producer: MagiCom Entertainment

Super Bowl halftime show chronology
XXII (1988)	XXIII (1989)	XXIV (1990)

The Super Bowl XXIII halftime show took place on January 22, 1989 at Joe Robbie Stadium in Miami, Florida. It was entitled "BeBop Bamboozled in 3-D". It featured a 1950s theme, an Elvis impersonator, 3D effects (for the broadcast audience), and a magic trick.

== Selection of MagiCom Entertainment as producer ==
The NFL was looking to find new producers and ideas for its halftime shows in the years 1988, 1989, and 1990. NFL officials met with several individuals, among them was Dan Witkowski, a veteran stage illusionist and owner of the small company MagicCom. He did not give them specifics for a show at the meeting, but rather asked for the opportunity to give a formal presentation to them, which was granted. To pique the interest of the league officials, Witkowski put a padlock on the leather-bound pitch books he sent to the member of the league's halftime show selection committee ahead of his presentation.

After his presentation, Witkowski and his company were given the opportunity to co-produce the 1988 Super Bowl pre-game show (as a dry-run of sorts) in addition to the 1989 halftime show.

== Production ==
The halftime show created was titled "BeBop Bamboozled".

It was decided that the show would have a 1950s theme. The show featured an Elvis impersonator dubbed "Elvis Presto", played by then-Solid Gold dancer Alex Cole. Two portions of Elvis Presley songs were performed ("Blue Suede Shoes" and "Burning Love"), and the rest of the show instead featured songs from musicals among other tunes. Cole had not originally been the individual cast to impersonate Elvis. Rather, he was the choreographer for an individual who had previously played Elvis on Broadway. When that individual backed out, Cole was cast in his place. The vocals of "Elvis Presto" were pre-recorded, performed by Jody LoMedico.

The show featured roughly 2,000 South Florida-area dancers and performers. Among the choreographers was June Taylor. Donald Pippin was in charge of the music.

A number of magic tricks had been considered by Witkowski. It was decided that their big trick would be a large-scale card trick.

The show also featured the use of 102 custom-made Harley Davidson motorcycles, as well as pink Cadillacs and fireworks.

Several scenes included computer generated 3D images using the Pulfrich effect, and camera movements and choreography for the event were arranged to feature the constant lateral motion needed to support the effect. Prior to the game, Coca-Cola distributed 3-D glasses at retailers for viewers to use. At the start of the halftime show, primary sponsor Diet Coke aired the first commercial in 3D. Coca-Cola had originally planned to use the 3D Diet Coke commercial as part of the Moonlighting season finale, which was also aired in 3D, but withdrew plans due to the 1988 Writers Guild of America Strike. This made the show the first 3D live television event to be broadcast. Coca-Cola manufactured 26 million pairs of 3D glasses, despite the Super Bowl having a much greater audience.

== Synopsis ==
The event was immediately preceded by a pre-taped introduction by Bob Costas, followed by the 3D Diet Coke commercial.

The show then began with the performance's emcee "Elvis Presto" (an Elvis Presley impersonator and magician) appearing from inside a jukebox. Various songs were performed, most of which were not Elvis Presley songs.

Presto and the dancers performed various magic tricks during their numbers. One stunt in the show consisted of dancers defying gravity by leaning horizontally against parking meters. A large card trick was performed with audience participation; Presto urged the stadium audience to pick one of four cards, and an applause meter indicated which card the audience had chosen.

== Setlist ==
1. "Blue Suede Shoes" (snippet)
2. "Rock This Town"
3. Card trick
4. "Do You Love Me"/"Twist and Shout"
5. "Devil with a Blue Dress On"
6. "Burning Love"
7. "Great Balls of Fire"
8. "Greased Lightnin'"
9. "Good Lovin'"

== Critical reception ==
Writing for the Sun Sentinel, Jack Zink compared the show to the Ringling Bros. and Barnum & Bailey Circus. He also opined that the "pregame entertainment was more enjoyable". Many outlets have retrospectively ranked the show as among the worst halftime performances.
