= Tutti Frutti (game show) =

German game show

The show's title card

Tutti Frutti was the German version of the Italian game show Colpo Grosso ("Big Shot"). It was aired from 21 January 1990 through to 21 February 1993 on RTL plus for three series, totaling approximately 140 episodes. It was the first erotic TV show on German television and was also available to viewers across Europe as it was broadcast without encryption via the Astra satellite which could be received over a wide area and was popular with 'early adopter' satellite enthusiasts in the UK. The show caused substantial outrage at the time, as partial nudity was a central feature (the show featured scantily dressed and stripping women).

The show was innovative in broadcasting 3D effect film clips where the background was scrolled across the screen at a slower speed than dancers in the foreground, thereby giving the effect of depth on a 2D screen using the Pulfrich effect.

After being off the air for no longer than 26 years, A brief one-off reboot to the show aired on its spinoff channel RTL Nitro hosted by Jörg Draeger and Alexander Wipprecht on 30 December 2016.

== The program ==
The host of the show was Hugo Egon Balder, who was supported by up to three co-hosts:

- Series 1: Monique Sluyter, Tiziana d'Arcangelo, Nora Wenck
- Series 2: Sluyter, d'Arcangelo
- Series 3: Gabriella Lunghi

The program was staged on a staggering basis in the studios of the production company ASA TV in Cologno Monzese, a suburb of Milan. The shooting time was around four weeks each. The set design, the format and the cast with each season changing were completely taken over by Colpo Grosso, as well as the song sung in Italian. Other Colpo Grosso adaptations were in Spain (¡Ay, qué calor!) and Sweden (Tutti Frutti). In Brazil, a version that was not taped in Italy, but almost completely copied, was called Cocktail. Even today, the Italian version is broadcast on various satellite channels worldwide.

== Objective ==
Two contestants could win points during guessing game rounds, which were invested into removing various clothing items of a stripper. The contestants would call 'heiß' or 'kalt' (hot or cold) to make their guess. If the lady was almost entirely undressed, a so-called "Länderpunkt" (country point) was awarded (the term "Länderpunkt" is still widely associated with the show even today). The number of obtained "Länderpunkte" then determined the winnings, which could occasionally reach up to 5000 ECU coins. The studio band played throughout the program to create a loose atmosphere.

== "Cin Cin Girls" ==
A significant portion of success of Tutti Frutti is attributed to the so-called "ballet Cin Cin" (in the original Italian, "ragazze cin cin"). This was a group of internationally well-known models, who were hired permanently to fill certain roles in the show. Each was representing a certain fruit and some are still known as this fruit. Former German "Playmates of the Year" Stella Kobs (lemon in series 1) Jolie Mitnick Salter (blueberry in series 1) and Elke Jeinsen (strawberry in series 2) filled this role, among others.

== Reception ==
When Tutti Frutti was first broadcast, the Federal Republic of Germany was changing. Tutti Frutti as the first erotic TV show on German television acted, so to speak, as a kind of "erotic wall opening". The program was then criticized as being misogynistic, but the fact that Tutti Frutti dared to deal with the bare facts hardly led to a scandal. Rather, the debate in the German tabloid and quality press at the time documented the "normalization of publicly staged nudity." The mostly devastating judgments of TV criticism aimed more at the questionable aesthetics of the program than at moral questions.

Financially, Tutti Frutti was a great success for a long time, as the advertising revenue far exceeded the minute price of the program. Tutti Frutti drew attention to itself, among other things, by filing a complaint by the responsible state media authority against RTL for the display of sponsorship advertisements (hence the display of permanent commercials or the subsequent blurring of the logos), by recorders with strips in 3D (see Pulfrich effect) in the second season and through a very extensive merchandising (sound carriers, magazines, calendars, videos). Neue Revue magazine sponsored the first season.

Above all, fans appreciated the show's rather anarchic charm. "Tutti Frutti was what would later have been called a cult-classic," said media critic Hans Hoff.
