= Pulfrich effect =

Misperception of depth due to difference in timing between eye signals

Plan view of a pendulum swinging in a plane (solid black) that appears to swing in an ellipse (dashed black) when one eye views it through a neutral-density filter – A denotes the actual position of the bob, A′ its previous position (as perceived by the darkened eye) and A* its apparent position; similarly for B and C.

The Pulfrich effect is a psychophysical percept wherein lateral motion of an object in the field of view is interpreted by the visual cortex as having a depth component, due to a relative difference in signal timings between the two eyes.

== Overview ==
The effect is generally induced by placing a dark filter over one eye but can also occur spontaneously in several eye diseases such as cataract, optic neuritis, or multiple sclerosis. In such cases, symptoms such as difficulties judging the paths of oncoming cars have been reported. The phenomenon is named for German physicist Carl Pulfrich, who first described it in 1922. Carl Pulfrich was the brother-in-law of Heinrich Hertz. The effect has been exploited as the basis for some television, film, and game 3D presentations.

== Demonstration ==
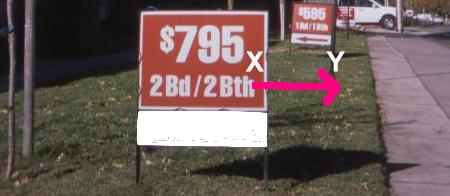
Imagine a camera which starts at position X and moves right to position Y. If a viewer then watches this segment with a dark lens over the left eye, then when the right eye sees the image recorded when the camera is at Y, the left eye will be a few milliseconds behind and will still be seeing the image recorded at X, thus creating the necessary parallax to generate right and left eye views and 3D perception, much the same as when still pictures are generated by shifting a single camera.

In the classic Pulfrich effect experiment, a subject views a pendulum swinging in a plane perpendicular to the observer's line of sight. When a neutral density filter (a darkened lens—typically gray) is placed in front of, say, the right eye, the pendulum seems to take on an elliptical orbit, appearing closer as it swings toward the right and farther as it swings toward the left, so that if it were to theoretically be viewed from above, it would appear to be revolving counterclockwise. Conversely, if the left eye is covered, the pendulum would appear to be revolving clockwise-from-top, appearing closer as it swings toward the left and farther as it swings toward the right.

A similar effect can be achieved by using a stationary camera and continuously rotating an otherwise stationary object. If the movement stops, the eye looking through the dark lens (which could be either eye depending on the direction the camera is moving) will "catch up" and the effect will disappear. One advantage of this system is that people not wearing the glasses will see a perfectly normal picture.

== Explanation ==
The widely accepted explanation of the apparent depth is that a reduction in retinal illumination (relative to the fellow eye) yields a corresponding delay in signal transmission, imparting instantaneous spatial disparity in moving objects. This seems to occur because visual system latencies are generally shorter (i.e., the visual system responds more quickly) for bright targets as compared to dim targets. This motion with depth is the visual system's solution to a moving target when a difference in retinal illuminance, and hence a difference in signal latencies, exists between the two eyes.

The Pulfrich effect has typically been measured under full field conditions with dark targets on a bright background, and yields about a 15 ms delay for a factor of ten difference in average retinal illuminance. These delays increase monotonically with decreased luminance over a wide (> 6 log-units) range of luminance. The effect is also seen with bright targets on a black background and exhibits the same luminance-to-latency relationship.

== Use in stereoscopy ==
The Pulfrich effect has been utilized to enable a type of stereoscopy, or 3D visual effect, in visual media such as film and TV. As in other kinds of stereoscopy, glasses are used to create the illusion of a three-dimensional image. By placing a neutral filter (e.g., the darkened lens from a pair of sunglasses) over one eye, an image, as it moves right to left (or left to right, but not up and down) will appear to move in depth, either toward or away from the viewer.

Because the Pulfrich effect depends on motion in a particular direction to instigate the illusion of depth, it is not useful as a general stereoscopic technique. For example, it cannot be used to show a stationary object apparently extending into or out of the screen; similarly, objects moving vertically will not be seen as moving in depth. Incidental movement of objects will create spurious artifacts, and these incidental effects will be seen as artificial depth not related to actual depth in the scene. Many of the applications of Pulfrich involve deliberately causing just this sort of effect, which has given the technique a bad reputation. When the only movement is lateral movement of the camera then the effect is as real as any other form of stereoscopy, but this seldom happens except in highly contrived situations. It can, however, be effective as a novelty effect in contrived visual scenarios. One advantage of material produced to take advantage of the Pulfrich effect is that it is fully backward-compatible with "regular" viewing; unlike stereoscopic (two-image) video, a 3D Pulfrich effect only has one image and as a result does not produce the ghosting effect for those not wearing glasses or the color distortion of technologies such as anaglyph. The Pulfrich effect can also be achieved by wearing a sunglass lens over one eye, and since sunglasses are very common, the need to distribute "special" 3D glasses is reduced.

=== Examples ===
The effect achieved a small degree of popularity in television in the late 1980s and 1990s. On Sunday, January 22, 1989 the Super Bowl XXIII halftime show and a specially produced commercial for Diet Coke were telecast using this effect. In the commercial, objects moving in one direction appeared to be nearer to the viewer (actually in front of the television screen) and when moving in the other direction, appeared to be farther from the viewer (behind the television screen). Forty million pairs of paper-framed 3D viewing "glasses" were distributed by Coca-Cola USA for the event (though they were originally produced and intended for a May 1988 3D episode of Moonlighting that never finished production due to a writer's strike). The right eye's filter was grayed purple (resembling red wine color), while the left was very light amber (resembling white wine color). These colors complemented each other to produce the Pulfrich effect while avoiding distortion in the broadcast's natural colors. The commercial was in this case restricted to objects (such as refrigerators and skateboarders) moving down a steep hill from left to right across the screen, a directional dependency determined by which eye was covered by the darker filter. The commercial was said to be created using Nuoptix 3D technology to create the Pulfrich effect.

The effect was also used well throughout the whole 1993 Doctor Who charity special Dimensions in Time and in dream sequences of the 1997 3rd Rock from the Sun two-part season 2 finale "Nightmare on Dick Street". In many countries in Europe, a series of short 3D films, produced in the Netherlands, were shown on television. Glasses were sold at a chain of petrol stations. These short films were mainly travelogues of Dutch localities. A Power Rangers Lightspeed Rescue movie called Power Rangers in 3D: Triple Force (later broadcast as two-part Trakeena's Revenge) sold on VHS through McDonald's purportedly used "Circlescan 4D" technology, which is based on the Pulfrich effect, but there was very little 3D present. In the United States and Canada, six million 3D Pulfrich glasses were distributed to viewers for an episode of Discovery Channel's Shark Week in 2000. Animated programs that employed the Pulfrich effect in specific segments of its programs include Yo Yogi!, The Bots Master, and Space Strikers; they typically achieved the effect through the use of constantly moving background and foreground layers.

In France, Le Magazine de la Santé, a long-lasting popular medicine TV-show, has extensively presented the effect in October 2016, inviting its viewers "to see the program in 3D for the first time".

Some episodes of the Italian/German TV game show Tutti Frutti utilised the effect. One of the showgirls stripped topless while others danced around her in an anticlockwise pattern, while two additional rear layers were created by graphics moving at different speeds. It is not known how viewing glasses were distributed. Episodes are widely available on the internet, but only a few use the Pulfrich effect.

The video game Orb-3D for the Nintendo Entertainment System used the effect (by having the player's ship always moving) and came packed with a pair of glasses. So did Jim Power: The Lost Dimension in 3-D for the Super NES, using constantly scrolling backgrounds to cause the effect.
