= David L. Vander Meulen =

American bibliographer

David L. Vander Meulen is professor of English at the University of Virginia and has been editor of the journal of the Bibliographical Society of the University of Virginia, Studies in Bibliography since 1991. He is author of The Bibliographical Society of the University of Virginia: The First Fifty Years.

== Education and career ==
David L. Vander Meulen earned degrees at Calvin College, B.A., 1970; University of Wisconsin–Madison, M.A. 1971, PhD.

Vander Meulen is professor of English at the University of Virginia, where he teaches eighteenth-century English literature, bibliography, textual criticism and scholarly editing. He has observed: "Although bibliography, textual criticism, and book history are parts of a common enterprise, each employs distinctive approaches and makes unique contributions."

He gave the Engelhard Lecture in Bibliography at the Center for the Book at the Library of Congress in 1987.

Vander Meulen's editorial projects include an historical account of the composition and production of the Alexander Pope poem, "The Dunciad" through the 1728 edition: Pope’s Dunciad of 1728: A History and Facsimile. Of this historical account, Nicolas Barker observed "a text can be achieved that is eclectic but also soundly based." Other editorial projects include translations of Sallust by Samuel Johnson; and a facsimile and transcription of the University of Virginia holograph manuscript by William Faulkner of the novel, Mosquitoes.

Vander Meulen also teaches at the Rare Book School at the University of Virginia.

== Honors ==
- Edward L. Ayers Advising Fellow Award, University of Virginia, 2013–2015.
- Alfred A. and Blanche W. Knopf Fellowship, University of Texas, 2001
- Rawlings Prize, Albemarle County [Virginia] Historical Society, 1997.
- Guggenheim Fellow, 1996–1997
- Vice-president, Bibliographical Society of America, 1992–1996
- Engelhard Lecture in Bibliography, Center for the Book, Library of Congress, 1987.
- National Endowment for the Humanities, Summer Stipend, 1986, 2000
- Bibliographical Society of America, Fellow, 1983–1984
- William Andrews Clark Library Fellow, 1982

== Selected publications ==
- Vander Meulen, David L., ed. (2021). Tanselle, G. Thomas. Books in My Life. Charlottesville: The Bibliographical Society of the University of Virginia.
- Vander Meulen, David L. (2011) ESTC as Foundational and Always Developing The Age of Johnson.: 21:263-XIV.
- Vander Meulen, David L. (2011) "Pattison’s Pope as an Index of Lives,” in Tanselle, G. Thomas, Hal Kugeler, eds. Other People’s Books : Association Copies and the Stories They Tell. Caxton Club, Chicago.
- Vander Meulen, David L. (2009) "Bibliography and Other History." Textual Cultures 4.1 (Spring):113–28.
- Vander Meulen, David L. (2008) "The Afterlife of the Imagination: Posthumous Adventures of Pope's Essay on Man," in Imagining Selves: Essays in Honor of Patricia Meyer Spacks, ed. Rivka Swenson and Elise Lauterbach, Newark: University of Delaware Press.
- Vander Meulen, David L. (2008) "Thoughts on the Future of Bibliographical Analysis," Papers of the Bibliographical Society of Canada 46.1 .
- Vander Meulen, David L. (2003–2004)."How to Read Book History," Studies in Bibliography 56.
- Vander Meulen, David L. (2002) "Sir William Dugdale and the Making of Books," in Roberts, Marion. Dugdale and Hollar: History Illustrated. Newark, London: University of Delaware Press; Associated University Presses.
- Vander Meulen, David L. (2002) "An Essay towards Perfection: J. D. Fleeman's A Bibliography of the Works of Samuel Johnson," The Age of Johnson 13.
- Vander Meulen, David L. (2001) "The Editing of Pope's Dunciad from Scriblerus to ***," in Eighteenth-Century Contexts: Historical Inquiries in Honor of Phillip Harth, ed. Howard D. Weinbrot, Peter J. Schakel, and Stephen E. Karian.
- Vander Meulen, David L. (1999) "Revision in Bibliographical Classics: 'McKerrow' and 'Bowers,'" Studies in Bibliography 52.
- Vander Meulen, David L. (1999) "A System of Manuscript Transcription," Studies in Bibliography 52. With G. Thomas Tanselle.
- Vander Meulen, David L. (1999) "The Editorial Principles of Martinus Scriblerus," in Kirsop, Wallace, and David Garrioch. The Culture of the Book : Essays from Two Hemispheres in Honour of Wallace Kirsop. Melbourne: Bibliographical Society of Australia and New Zealand.
- Vander Meulen, David L. (1997) A History of the Bibliographical Society of the University of Virginia: The First Fifty Years and Publications of the Bibliographical Society of the University of Virginia, 1947-1996, Studies in Bibliography 50.
- Vander Meulen, David L. (1994) "Unauthorized Editions of Pope's Dunciad, 1728-1751," in Writers, Books, and Trade: An Eighteenth-Century English Miscellany for William B. Todd, edited by O. M. Brack. New York: AMS Press.
- Vander Meulen, David L. (1992) “Studies in Bibliography. Vol. 46. David L. Vander Meulen.” 1992. The Papers of the Bibliographical Society of America 86 (4): 486.
- Vander Meulen, David L. (1992) "Fredson Bowers as Music Critic," Dictionary of Literary Biography Yearbook: 1991.
- Vander Meulen, David L. (1989) "The Dunciad in Four Books and the Bibliography of Pope," Papers of the Bibliographical Society of America 83.3.
- Vander Meulen, David L. "The History and Future of Bowers's Principles,"(1985) Papers of the Bibliographical Society of America 79.2, reprinted in Fredson Bowers at Eighty (1985).
- Vander Meulen, David L. (1984) "The Identification of Paper Without Watermarks: The Example of Pope's Dunciad," Studies in Bibliography 37.
- Vander Meulen, David L.(1982) "The Printing of Pope's Dunciad, 1728," Studies in Bibliography 35.
