= Center for the Book =

Extension of the US Library of Congress for literacy

The Library of Congress's Center for the Book was founded in 1977 by Daniel J. Boorstin, the Librarian of Congress, to promote literacy, libraries, and reading and an understanding of the history and heritage of American literature. The Center for the Book is mainly supported by tax-deductible donations.

== History ==
In 1977, Librarian of Congress Dr. Daniel J. Boorstin founded the Library of Congress's Center for the Book, which was established by Congress in public law 95-129 to promote books, reading, literacy and libraries, as well as the scholarly study of books. Dr. Boorstin appointed Dr. John Y. Cole to the position of founding director of the Center for the Book. Cole had previously served as the chairman of the one-year task force on library goals, organization and planning that had recommended a Center for the Book to Dr. Boorstin.

In 1984 the center began to establish state affiliate Centers for the Book. Center for the Book Affiliates carry out the national Center’s mission, sponsor programs that highlight their area’s local literary heritage and call attention to the importance of books, reading, libraries and literacy. Today there are affiliate centers in all 50 states, American Samoa, the District of Columbia, Guam, Northern Marianas, Puerto Rico, and the U.S. Virgin Islands.

== Leadership ==
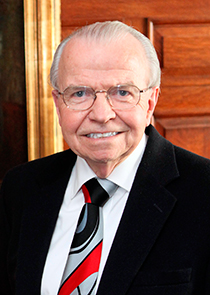
John Y. Cole, Founding Director Center for the Book, 1977-2016.

Dr. John Y. Cole was the founding director of the Center for the Book in 1977. He is the author of Jefferson’s Legacy: A Brief History of the Library of Congress (1993) and On These Walls: Inscriptions and Quotations in the Library of Congress (1995), among other books focusing on the history of the Library of Congress.

The role that John Cole and the Center for the Book played in promoting the study of the history of the book was documented in a bibliographic essay, “The Center for the Book and the History of the Book” that covered the time period 1977-1999. Cole's work at the Center for the Book was honored in a special issue of Libraries & the Cultural Record

Cole retired as Director of the Center for the Book in 2016 and was appointed Library of Congress Historian where he served from 2016-2021.

Pam Jackson was director of the Center for the Book from 2016 to 2018.

John Van Oudenaren was director in 2018.

Guy Lamolinara, was director of the Center for the Book from 2018-2025. He is the author of “The National and International Roles of the Center for the Book.”

Suzanne Walker is the current manager of the Center for the Book.

== Affiliated projects ==
=== National Book Festival ===
The Library of Congress National Book Festival, established in 2001 by Laura Bush and James H. Billington, is an annual event in which the Center for the Book plays a major role. The festival was previously held on the National Mall for two days in the fall. Authors are invited to give readings, sign books, give lectures and do interviews. Representatives from across the country are also invited to promote their states’ literary heritage.

Every year since 2002, the Library affiliates each choose a book to celebrate at the Book Festival in the Library’s Roadmap to Reading. Lists of "Great Reads from Great Places" since 2002 are available at the Center for the Book website.

=== Engelhard Lectures ===
Between 1977 and 1987 the Center cosponsored (with the Library's Rare Book and Special Collections Division) the Engelhard Lectures. These included

- Elizabeth L. Eisenstein, "The Emergence of Print Culture in the West" (1977)
- Ian Willison, “From Bibliothéque du Roi to World Information Network: The National Library in Historical Perspective,” (1980)
- Dan H.Laurence, "A Portrait of the Author as a Bibliography." (1982)
- William Barlow, Book Collecting: Personal Rewards and Public Benefits (1983),
- Anthony Rota, A Bookseller Looks at Bibliography," (1984)
- John Feather and David McKitterick, The History of Books and Libraries: Two Views (1986)
- Lawrence Clark Powell, "Next to Mother’s Milk,"(1986),
- Donald William Krummel. "The Memory of Sound: Observations on the History of Music on Paper." (1987)
- Ward Ritchie, Fine Printing: The Los Angeles Tradition (1987)
- R. Kathleen Molz. The knowledge institutions in the information age: the special case of the public library. (1988)
- David L. Vander Meulen, Where Angels Fear to Tread : Descriptive Bibliography and Alexander Pope. (1988)

The lectures were funded by a gift from Mrs. Charles Engelhard, Jr.

=== Letters About Literature ===
Letters About Literature was a national contest created by the Center for the Book that encouraged literacy in grades 4–12. The contest asked students to read a work of either prose or poetry and write to its author (living or dead), explaining how what they read affected them. Contestants competed in one of three age groups: Level I: grades 4–6; Level II: grades 7–8; Level III: grades 9–12. Letters were initially screened through two rounds of judges, who were individuals with knowledge of children’s literature. The best letters moved on to state competitions, and those winners moved on to a national competition hosted by the Library of Congress. Judging began in March for state competitions, and national winners were announced in May. The final competition was held during the 2018/19 school year.

=== River of Words ===
The Center for the Book and St. Mary's College Center for Environmental Literacy partner in presenting River of Words, the largest youth poetry and art competition in the world. Founded in 1995 under former Poet Laureate Robert Hass, the contest is free to all contestants. The contest asks students ages 5–19 to examine a watershed in their environment and reflect on what it means to them. They must then express their reflection through poetry or art. In 2011 the Center for the Book co-sponsored a concert in which acclaimed composer Libby Larsen set some of the winning poems to music. Every year the contest receives tens of thousands of submissions. The contest is particularly popular with Scout troops and other organizations with an emphasis on the outdoors.

=== Young Readers Center ===
The Young Readers Center was opened in the Library of Congress's Thomas Jefferson Building in 2009 to provide a place for children 16 years and younger accompanied by an adult to access reading materials and other literary resources and to attend programs, such as a weekly story hour.

=== Literacy Awards ===
The Center for the Book began managing the Library of Congress Literacy Awards after their creation was announced at the 2012 International Summit for the Book. Created and sponsored by philanthropist David M. Rubenstein, the awards support organizations that perform innovative work in increasing literacy levels. Totaling $250,000, the three annual awards are given to organizations that have made significant progress in advancing the promotion of literacy in the United States and beyond: the David M. Rubenstein Prize ($150,000), the American Prize ($50,000), and the International Prize ($50,000).

The award winners and honorees are announced at the annual Library of Congress National Book Festival, and list is available at the Library of Congress website.

=== National Collegiate Book Collecting Contest ===
The National Collegiate Book Collecting Contest was started in 2005 by Fine Books & Collections magazine to recognize extraordinary book collections of college students. After three years of running the competition, the magazine turned it over to the Library of Congress. More than 35 colleges and universities hold book-collecting contests. The winners of those contests are encouraged to enter the national competition. Student book collectors whose schools do not offer a competition may also apply to the national contest.

=== Library of Congress Poetry & Literature Center ===
The Center for the Book administers the Library of Congress Poetry & Literature Center, which serves as the Office of the U.S. Poet Laureate. The Poetry & Literature Center organizes a yearly program of readings, performances, conferences and lectures. The center oversees the prestigious biannual Rebekah Johnson Bobbitt National Prize for Poetry. The prize is awarded to the most distinguished American book of poetry published in the two years before the award is given. The center also grants the esteemed Witter Bynner Fellowship. Started in 1998, the Poetry & Literature Center awards these fellowships to two up-and-coming poets.

=== National Ambassador for Young People’s Literature ===
Sponsored by the Center for the Book and the Children’s Book Council, the National Ambassador for Young People’s Literature serves to promote youth literacy and the valuable attributes it develops, such as lifelong literacy, education and the growth and enhancement of the lives of young people. The ambassador is appointed by a select group of individuals who work in the youth literature field. Four individuals have held the positions since its creation in 2008: Jon Scieszka, Katherine Paterson, Walter Dean Myers, Kate DiCamillo, and current ambassador Gene Luen Yang.

== See also ==
- Books in the United States
