= Visual inspection =

Common method of quality control, data acquisition, and data analysis

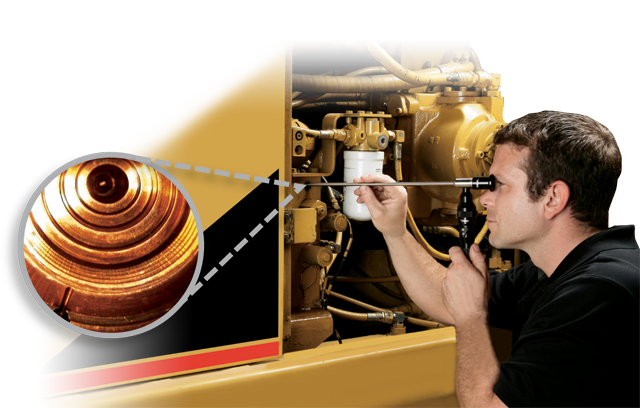

Visual inspection is a common method of quality control, data acquisition, and data analysis. Visual Inspection, used in maintenance of facilities, means inspection of equipment and structures using either or all of raw human senses such as vision, hearing, touch and smell and/or any non-specialized inspection equipment. Inspections requiring Ultrasonic, X-Ray equipment, Infrared, etc. are not typically regarded as visual inspection as these Inspection methodologies require specialized equipment, training and certification.

== Quality control ==
A study of the visual inspection of small integrated circuits found that the modal duration of eye fixations of trained inspectors was about 200 ms. The most accurate inspectors made the fewest eye fixations and were the fastest. When the same chip was judged more than once by an individual inspector the consistency of judgment was very high whereas the consistency between inspectors was somewhat less. Variation by a factor of six in inspection speed led to variation of less than a factor of two in inspection accuracy. Visual inspection had a false positive rate of 2% and a false negative rate of 23%.

== Humorous terminology ==
To do an eyeball search is to look for something specific in a mass of code or data with one's own eyes, as opposed to using some sort of pattern matching software like grep or any other automated search tool. Also known as vgrep or ogrep, i.e., "visual/optical grep". See also vdiff.

"Eyeballing" is the most common and readily available method of initial data assessment. This method is effective for identifying patterns or anomalies in complex data but can be time-intensive and error-prone. Although low-cost and adaptable, its efficiency and ROI often fall short compared to automated tools, which offer greater scalability and consistency. However, switching from manual visual inspection to automated methods depends on the task's complexity, scale, and the balance between upfront costs and long-term efficiency.

Experts in pattern recognition maintain that the "eyeball" technique is still the most effective procedure for searching arbitrary, possibly unknown structures in data.

In the military, applying this sort of search to real-world terrain is often referred to as "using the Mark I Eyeball" device (pronounced as Mark One Eyeball), the U.S. military adopting it in 1950s. The term is an allusion on military nomenclature, "Mark I" being the first version of a military vehicle or weapon.

== See also ==
- Automated optical inspection
- Inspection
- Inspection (medicine)
- Statistical graphics
- Visual search
- Visual comparison
