= Hinman collator =

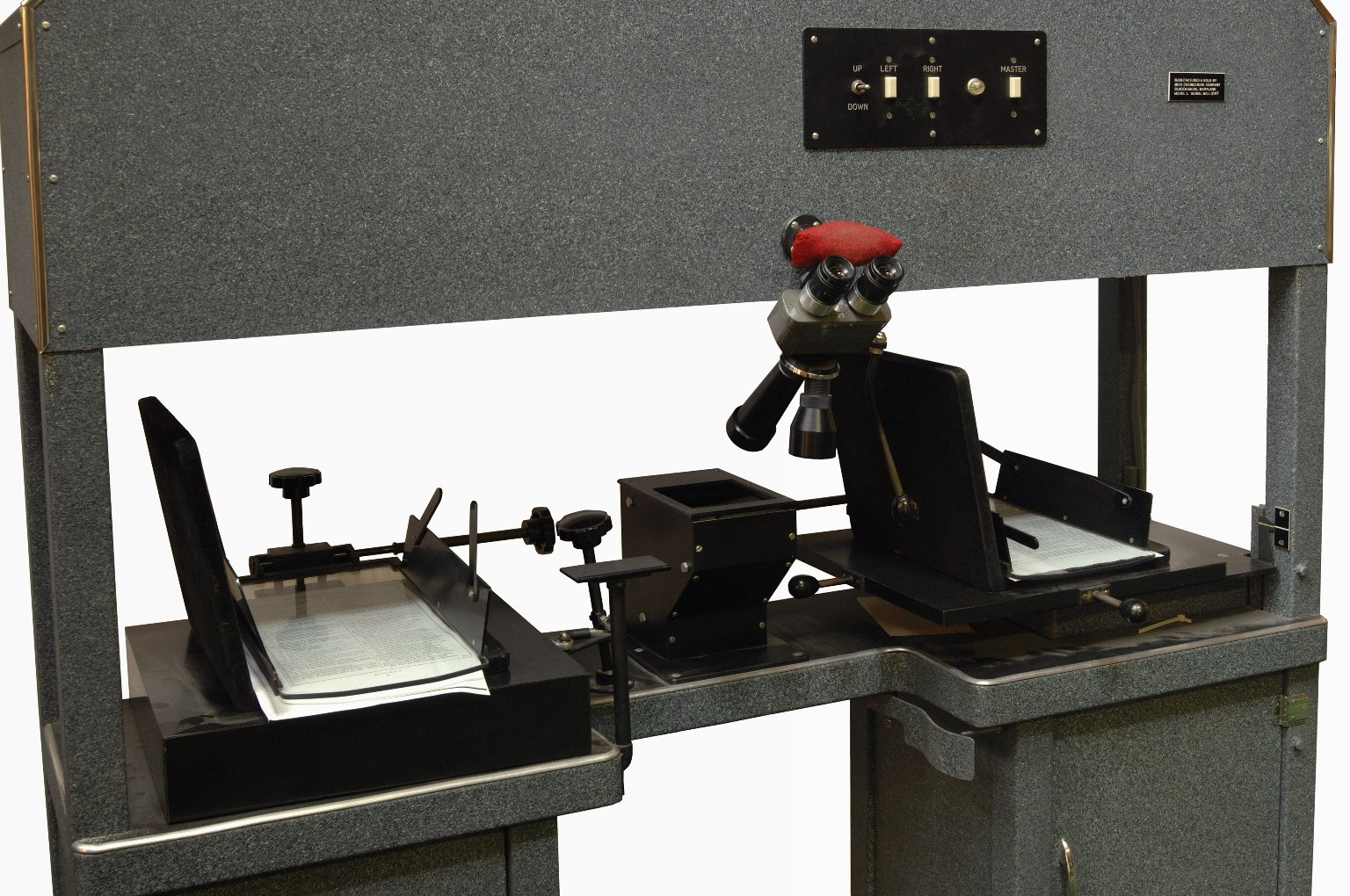
A Hinman collator owned by the Folger Shakespeare Library

The Hinman collator, an early optical collator, was an opto-mechanical device for comparing pairs of documents for differences in the text. Documents that appeared similar were said to “collate”. The collator resulted in rapid advances in the study of literary works.

Invented by Charlton Hinman in the late 1940s, the device used lights and mirrors to superimpose images of the two documents so that differences in text alignment or wording stood out. This resulted in huge improvements in speed and efficiency compared to the traditional cross-referencing of texts by eye.

The idea built on earlier work such as Carl Pulfrich's blink comparator used to help identify the former planet Pluto, and Hinman's work analysing aerial photographs during World War II.

Hinman used his device to compare the many slightly different impressions of the First Folio of William Shakespeare's works. The printing and bookbinding processes used in the time of Shakespeare often resulted in variations in the pages bound into the final books, and the collator enabled Hinman to describe the exact order in which the Folios had been composited and printed. He used the collator to compare 55 different copies of the First Folio held by the Folger Shakespeare Library, and subsequently wrote about his findings in Printing and Proof-reading of the First Folio of Shakespeare in 1963.

In the wake of Hinman's success, the device was purchased by a number of universities, libraries and other institutions (allegedly including the CIA). As more compact types of collator were developed in the 1960s, the last Hinman was built in 1978. In his 2002 survey of mechanical collators, Steven Escar Smith estimates from scattered records that as many as 59 Hinman Collators were produced, 41 of these surviving at the time of his survey's publication.

A more portable collator was developed by Randall McLeod.

== See also ==
- Blink comparator
- vdiff
