= Fredson Bowers =

American bibliographer and scholar (1905–1991)

Fredson Thayer Bowers
- Born: April 25, 1905; New Haven, Connecticut
- Died: April 11, 1991 (aged 85); Charlottesville, Virginia
- Occupation: Bibliographer
- Known for: Principles of Bibliographical Description

Fredson Thayer Bowers (1905–1991) was an American bibliographer and scholar of textual editing.

== Career ==
Bowers was a graduate of Brown University and Harvard University (Ph.D.). He taught at Princeton University before moving to the University of Virginia in 1938.

Bowers was a cryptanalyst and served as a commander in the United States Navy during World War II leading a group of codebreakers.

In 1947 he led a group of faculty and interested local citizens in founding the Bibliographical Society of the University of Virginia, and served as president for many years. He founded its annual publication Studies in Bibliography, which became a leading journal in the field. He was succeeded by David L. Vander Meulen as editor in 1991.

He was Rosenbach Fellow in Bibliography in 1954 at the University of Pennsylvania.

He also was named to the Lyell Readership in Bibliography at Oxford University and the Sandars Readership in Bibliography at Cambridge University.

Bowers was awarded a Guggenheim Fellowship in 1958. In 1969 he was awarded the Gold Medal of The Bibliographical Society. He retired in 1975, retaining the title Linden Kent Professor of English Emeritus at the University of Virginia.

== Personal life ==
Bowers had three sons and a daughter with his first wife: Fredson Bowers Jr., Stephen, Peter, and Joan.

His second wife, novelist Nancy Hale, died in 1988.

== Works written or edited ==
- The Dog Owner's Handbook (1936) Author.
- Bowers, Fredson. 1940. Elizabethan Revenge Tragedy, 1587-1642. Princeton: Princeton University Press.
- The Fary Knight: or, Oberon the Second: a Manuscript Play Attributed to Thomas Randolph (1942) Editor.
- Bowers, Fredson. 1946. “Notes on Standing Type in Elizabethan Printing.” The Papers of the Bibliographical Society of America 40 (3): 205–24.
- "Criteria for Classifying Hand-Printed Books as Issues and Variant States" (1947) Author.
- “Certain Basic Problems in Descriptive Bibliography.” The Papers of the Bibliographical Society of America 42 (3) 1948: 211–28.
- Principles of Bibliographical Description (1949) Author.
- George Sandys: a Bibliographical Catalogue of Printed Editions in England to 1700 (1950) Author, with Richard Beale Davis.
- English Studies in Honor of James Southall Wilson (1951) Editor.
- The Dramatic Works of Thomas Dekker, vol. I. (1953) Editor.
- On Editing Shakespeare and the Elizabethan Dramatists (1955) Author.
- Whitman's Manuscripts: Leaves of Grass (1860) A Parallel Text (1955) Editor.
- The Bibliographical Way (1959) Author.
- Textual & Literary Criticism (1959) Author.
- The Scarlet Letter (1963) Editor. Nathaniel Hawthorne, author.
- The Merry Wives of Windsor (1963) Editor; William Shakespeare, author.
- Bibliography and Textual Criticism (1964) Author.
- Hamlet: an Outline-Guide to the Play (1965) Author.
- The Blithedale Romance: and Fanshawe (1965) Editor; Nathaniel Hawthorne, author.
- The House of the Seven Gables (1965) Editor; Nathaniel Hawthorne, author.
- Bibliography; Papers Read at a Clark Library Seminar, May 7, 1966 (1966) Author, with Lyle H. Wright.
- The Dramatic Works in the Beaumont and Fletcher Canon (1966) Editor.
- On Editing Shakespeare (1966). Author.
- William Shakespeare: Hamlet (1967) Adapted by the staff of Barnes & Noble from an original work by Fredson Bowers.
- John Dryden: Four Comedies (1967) Edited with Lester A. Beaurline.
- John Dryden: Four Tragedies (1967) Edited with Lester A. Beaurline.
- Two Lectures on Editing: Shakespeare and Hawthorne (1969) Author, with Charlton Hinman
- Our Old Home: a Series of English Sketches (1970) Editor. Nathaniel Hawthorne, author.
- A Wonder Book, and Tanglewood Tales (1972) Editor. Nathaniel Hawthorne, author.
- The Red Badge of Courage : a Facsimile Edition of the Manuscript (1973) Editor. Stephen Crane, author.
- The Complete Works of Christopher Marlowe (1973) Editor.
- The History of Tom Jones, a Foundling (1975) Editor. Henry Fielding, author.
- Essays in Bibliography, Text, and Editing Author, with a Foreword by Irby B. Cauthen, Jr. Charlottesville: Published for the Bibliographical Society of the University of Virginia by the University Press of Virginia, 1975. viii, 550 pp.
- Pragmatism (1975) Editor. William James, author.
- The Meaning of Truth (1975) Editor. William James, author.
- Essays in Radical Empiricism (1976) Editor. William James, author.
- Essays in philosophy (1978) Editor. William James, author.
- Pragmatism, a new name for some old ways of thinking; The meaning of truth, a sequel to Pragmatism (1978) Editor. William James, author.
- Some Problems of Philosophy (1979) Editor. William James, author.
- The Will to Believe and Other Essays in Popular Philosophy (1979) Editor. William James, author.
- Introductions, Notes, and Commentaries to Texts in 'The Dramatic Works of Thomas Dekker' (1980) Editor. Cyrus Hoy, author.
- Lectures on literature (1980) Editor. Vladimir Vladimirovich Nabokov, author.
- Lectures on Russian literature (1980) Editor. Vladimir Vladimirovich Nabokov, author.
- The Principles of Psychology (1981) Editor. William James, author.
- The Complete works of Christopher Marlowe (1981) Editor. Second edition.
- Essays in religion and morality (1982) Editor. William James, author.
- Leon Kroll: a spoken memoir (1983) Author, with Nancy Hale
- Lectures on Don Quixote (1983) Editor. Vladimir Vladimirovich Nabokov, author.
- Elizabethan dramatists (1987) Editor.
- Jacobean and Caroline dramatists (1987) Editor.
- Hamlet as minister and scourge and other studies in Shakespeare and Milton (1989) Author.
