= List of ISBN registration groups =

The registration group or identifier group is the second element in a 13-digit ISBN (first element in a 10-digit ISBN) and indicates the country, geographic region, or language area where a book was published. The element ranges from one to five numerical digits.

In 2007, the length of an ISBN changed from 10 to 13 digits, and a new 3-digit prefix (978 or 979) was added in front of 10-digit ISBNs.

The following identifier groups are compatible with or without a 978- prefix:

- 0–5
- 600–639
- 65–66
- 69990–69999
- 7
- 80–94
- 950–989
- 9900–9989
- 99900–99999

The following must have a 979- prefix:

- (979-0 is reserved for International Standard Music Numbers for sheet music)
- 979-10 through 979-13
- 979-8

Shorter registration group numbers are generally used for countries or regions with greater publishing volume. Because a longer number leaves room for fewer publishers and ISBNs, several countries have more than one number assigned. On the other hand, some countries (Australia, Switzerland, Fiji) have no unique number because they fall in a broader geographic region or language area.

== With 10-digit ISBN or 978- prefix ==
=== Prefixes of length 1 ===
Reg. group	Country, region, or language area (Note: Note that "language area" does not mean all books with the identifier are written in that language, only that the geographic area is identified as such; thus, books in Breton are identified as French language books, and books in Navajo are identified as English language books, etc.)	Type	ISBN example (book)
0	English	Language area	ISBN 0-330-28498-3; Douglas Adams, So Long, and Thanks for All the Fish, Pan Books (1984)
1	English	Language area	ISBN 1-58182-008-9; James Reasoner, Manassas, Cumberland House (1999)
2	French	Language area	ISBN 2-226-05257-7; Bernard Werber, Les Fourmis, Albin Michel (1991)
3	German	Language area	ISBN 3-7965-1900-8; Marco Jorio (ed.), Historisches Lexikon der Schweiz, Schwabe AG (2002-)
4	Japan	National	ISBN 4-19-830127-1; Yasuhiro Nightow, トライガン (vol. 1), Tokuma Shoten (2014)
5	former USSR	Regional	ISBN 5-85270-001-0; Советский Энциклопедический Словарь (4th ed.), Сов. энциклопедия (1986)
6	see #Prefixes of length 2, #Prefixes of length 3, and #Prefixes of length 5		
7	China	National	ISBN 7-301-10299-2 浦薛凤, 西洋近代政治思潮, 北京大学出版社(2007)
8	see #Prefixes of length 2		
9	see #Prefixes of length 2, #Prefixes of length 3, #Prefixes of length 4, and #Prefixes of length 5		

=== Prefixes of length 2 ===
Reg. group	Country, region, or language area	Type	ISBN example (book)
00~59	see #Prefixes of length 1		
60~63	see #Prefixes of length 3		
64	unallocated		
65	Brazil	National	ISBN 978-65-5525-005-3; Homer, Ilíada, Editora 34 (2020)
66	Federated Panel	Other	
67~68	unallocated		
69	see #Prefixes of length 5		
70~79	see #Prefixes of length 1		
80	former Czechoslovakia	Regional	ISBN 80-85983-44-3; Kdo byl kdo v našich dějinách ve 20. století (vol. 1), Libri (1998)
81	India	National	ISBN 81-7215-399-6; Joy Goswami (1995)
82	Norway	National	ISBN 82-530-0983-6; Pax Leksikon, Pax Forlag (1978-1981)
83	Poland	National	ISBN 83-08-01587-5; Joanna Siedlecka, Jaśnie Panicz, WL (1987)
84	Spain	National	ISBN 84-86546-08-7; Adolfo Camilo Díaz, Miénteme, dime la verdá, Azucel (1989)
85	Brazil	National	ISBN 85-7531-015-1; Claudio Tognolli, A Sociedade dos Chavões, São Paulo Escrituras (2001)
86	former Yugoslavia	Regional	ISBN 86-341-0846-5; Janko Prunk, Slovenski narodni vzpon, Državna založba Slovenije (1992)
87	Denmark	National	ISBN 87-595-2277-1; Leif Davidsen, Den serbiske dansker, Lindhardt & Ringhof (1996)
88	Italy	National	ISBN 88-04-47328-2; Sandrone Dazieri, Attenti al gorilla, Mondadori (1999)
89	South Korea	National	ISBN 89-04-02003-4 존 칼빈, 기독교강요 (상), 생명의말씀사 (1988)
90	Netherlands	National	ISBN 90-5691-187-2; Jan Timman, On the Attack, New In Chess (2006)
91	Sweden	National	ISBN 91-1-811692-2; Torgny Lindgren, Ormens väg på hälleberget, P.A. Norstedt (1982)
92	International NGO Publishers and EC Organizations	Other	ISBN 92-67-10370-9; ISO Standards Handbook: Technical drawings (4th ed., vol. 1), ISO (2002)
93	India	National	ISBN 93-5025-214-7; Purkait SK, Essentials of Oral Pathology, JP Medical Ltd (2011)
94	Netherlands	National	ISBN 978-94-6265-011-4; Netherlands Yearbook of International Law 2013, Crisis and International Law: Decoy or Catalyst?, T.M.C. Asser Press (2014)
95~98	see #Prefixes of length 3		
99	see #Prefixes of length 4 and #Prefixes of length 5		

=== Prefixes of length 3 ===
Reg. group	Country, region, or language area	Type	ISBN example (book)
600	Iran	National	ISBN 978-600-119-125-1 بهاءالدین خرمشاهی, از این دوراهه منزل, قطره (2012)
601	Kazakhstan	National	ISBN 978-601-7151-13-3; Gulnaz Imamniyazova (ed.), The Stock Markets of Russia and Kazakhstan: Prospects for Integration, Eurasian Development Bank (2010)
602	Indonesia	National	ISBN 978-602-8328-22-7; Dewi Nopianingsih, Masakan Padang, Galangpress (2009)
603	Saudi Arabia	National	ISBN 978-603-500-045-1; Yusuf AI-Hajj Ahmad, Encyclopedia of Islamic Jurisprudence Concerning Muslim Women, Dar-us-Salaam (2009)
604	Vietnam	National	ISBN 604-69-4510-0; Nguyễn Trà, Vì sao hồng hạc có bộ lông màu hồng?, Văn Học (2015)
605	Turkey	National	ISBN 605-384-057-2; Muhammed Bozdağ, Düşün ve Başar, Yakamoz (1999)
606	Romania	National	ISBN 978-606-8126-35-7; Leonard Ancuta, Infernul, Tracus Arte (2011)
607	Mexico	National	ISBN 978-607-455-035-1; Vidal Medina, Galimatías, Consejo nacional para la cultura y las artes (2008)
608	North Macedonia	National	ISBN 978-608-203-023-4; Blaže Ristovski (ed.), Encyclopaedia Macedonica (vol. 1), Macedonian Academy of Sciences and Arts (2009)
609	Lithuania	National	ISBN 609-01-1248-8; Jolita Herlyn, Trys mano vienynteliai, Alma LIttera (2013)
610	unallocated		
611	Thailand	National	ISBN 611-543-009-7 ʻAtcharāphorn Phongchawī et al., หุ่นไทย, สำนักงานคณะกรรมการวัฒนธรรมแห่งชาติ (2009)
612	Peru	National	ISBN 978-612-45165-9-7; Alonso Cueto, La Venganza del silencio, Planeta (2010)
613	Mauritius	National (Note: In practice, this group is mostly used by some subsidiaries of VDM Publishing with registered addresses in "Beau-Bassin, Mauritius".)	ISBN 978-613-1-57437-5; Benoît Vitkine, Les nachi, ou la construction d'une "jeunesse du pouvoir" russe, Editions Universitaires Europeennes (2011)
614	Lebanon	National	ISBN 978-614-404-018-8; Sihām Murḍī, Ma'a sabq al-iṣrār wa-l-taraṣṣud, Mu'assasat al-Intishār al-'Arabī (2010)
615	Hungary	National	ISBN 978-615-5014-99-4; Lengyel Dávid & Kuba Richárd, Holtak világa: A jóslat, Ad Librum (2011)
616	Thailand	National	ISBN 978-616-90393-3-4. Christopher G. Moore, The Corruptionist, Heaven Lake Press (2010)
617	Ukraine	National	ISBN 978-617-581-116-0; Volodymyr Hynda, Український спорт під нацистською свастикою (1941–1944 рр.), Ruta (2012)
618	Greece	National	ISBN 978-618-02-0789-7; Κώστας Στοφόρος, Ο χαμένος μύθος του Αισώπου, Μίνωας (2017)
619	Bulgaria	National	ISBN 978-619-90568-4-4; Opportunities and Prospects for Bulgarian Trade Relations with the Sub-Saharan Africa Countries, EVN (2017)
620	Mauritius	National	ISBN 978-620-0004574; Vulnerability of water stored in underground tanks: Reinforced concrete structures installed in wet and polluted areas, LAP Lambert Academic Publishing (2019)
621	Philippines	National	ISBN 978-621-9619-02-8; Undercover: Operation Julie, The Inside Story, Hendry Publishing (2019)
622	Iran	National	ISBN 978-622-601-101-3 لولا م. شِفِر, سارا قربانی برزی, اعداد شگفت انگیز در زندگی جانوران (جلد نرم), فاطمی (2018)
623	Indonesia	National	ISBN 978-623-91631-0-5; Incoterms 2020: ICC Rules for The Use of Domestic and International Trade Terms, Indonesian International Chamber of Commerce (2019)
624	Sri Lanka	National	ISBN 978-624-5375-00-4; Sri Lankan Son, Global Diplomat: Writings and Statements of Former Ambassador Jayantha Dhanapala, Sri Lanka Unites (2019)
625	Turkey	National	ISBN 978-625-7677-79-0; Turkey's Security: New Threats, Indigenous Solutions, and Overseas Stretch, Nobel Bilimsel Eserle (2021)
626	Taiwan	National	ISBN 978-626-7002-46-9; The Diary of Chen Huai-cheng, Vol. 7, Institute of Taiwan History, Academia Sinica (2021)
627	Pakistan	National	ISBN 978-627-511-029-3; Annual Status of Education Report Pakistan 2021, ASER Pakistan Secretariat (2022)
628	Colombia	National	ISBN 978-628-751006-7; Gestión territorial, una alternativa para la reparación a las víctimas: El caso de asentamientos informales en Mocoa, Universidad de la Salle (2021)
629	Malaysia	National	ISBN 978-629-97040-0-3; G.G.G. Goh, C.T. Lye, S.F. Yeo & M.I.T. Islam, Issues in Contemporary Business, MMU Press (2022)
630	Romania	National	ISBN 978-630-319-058-7; Julia Quinn, Regina Charlotte, Editura Litera (2023)
631	Argentina	National	ISBN 978-631-6507-00-6; Mauricio Lazzarato, El imperialismo del dólar: Crisis de la hegemonía estadounidense y estrategia revolucionaria, Tinta Limón Ediciones (2023)
632	Vietnam	National	
633	Egypt	National	
634	Indonesia	National	
635	Iran	National	
636~649	unallocated		
650~669	see #Prefixes of length 2		
670~698	unallocated		
699	see #Prefixes of length 5		
700~799	see #Prefixes of length 1		
800~949	see #Prefixes of length 2		
950	Argentina	National	ISBN 950-04-0442-7; Abelardo Castillo, El que tiene sed, Emecé (1985)
951	Finland	National	ISBN 951-0-11369-7; Sinikka Laine, Ohari, WSOY (1982)
952	Finland	National	ISBN 952-471-294-6; J. Pekka Mäkelä, 391, Like (2004)
953	Croatia	National	ISBN 953-157-105-8; Višnja Špiljak & Vladimir Ivir (eds.), Englesko-hrvatski poslovni rječnik, Masmedia (2000)
954	Bulgaria	National	ISBN 954-430-603-X; Ташо В. Ташев, Министрите на България 1879-1999, Академично издателство "Проф.Марин Дринов" (1999)
955	Sri Lanka	National	ISBN 955-20-3051-X මාලිංග අමරසිංහ, පොළොන්නරුවේ නටබුන්, S. Godage & Bros (1998)
956	Chile	National	ISBN 956-7291-48-9; Ursula & Cristina Calderón, Hai Kur Mamashu Shis (Quiero contarte un cuento), Ediciones Kultrún (2005)
957	Taiwan	National	ISBN 957-01-7429-3 許雪姬 (ed.), 臺灣歷史辭典=Dictionary of Taiwan History, 文建會 (2004)
958	Colombia	National	ISBN 958-04-6278-X; Karla Suárez, Carroza para actores, Norma (2001)
959	Cuba	National	ISBN 959-10-0363-3; Lisandro Otero, Llover sobre mojado, Editorial Letras Cubanas (1997)
960	Greece	National	ISBN 978-960-99626-7-4; Ιωάννης της Κλίμακος, Κλίμαξ, Ιερά Μονή Παρακλήτου (2015)
961	Slovenia	National	ISBN 961-6403-23-0; Tomaž Humar, Ni nemogočih poti, Mobitel (2001)
962	Hong Kong	National	ISBN 962-04-0195-6 潘翎, 上海掌故, Joint Publishing Company (1982)
963	Hungary	National	ISBN 963-7971-51-3; András Petőcz, A tenger dicsérete, Orpheusz (1994)
964	Iran	National	ISBN 964-6194-70-2; Nasrollah Kasraian, Mountains of Iran
965	Israel	National	ISBN 965-359-002-2; David H. Stern, Messianic Jewish Manifesto', Jewish New Testament Publications (1988)
966	Ukraine	National	ISBN 966-95440-5-X; Владимир Дергачев, Геополитика, ВІРА-Р (2000)
967	Malaysia	National	ISBN 967-978-753-2; Khoo Kheng-Hor, Are You A Maverick?, Pelanduk Publications (2001)
968	Mexico	National	ISBN 968-6031-02-2; Natalio Hernández, Xochikoskatl, Kalpulli Editorial (1985)
969	Pakistan	National	ISBN 978-969-35-2020-0; Ahmad Hasan Dani, History of Pakistan: Pakistan through ages, Sang-e-Meel Publications (2007)
970	Mexico	National	ISBN 970-20-0242-7; Lourdes Urrea, Fuera de este mundo, Castillo
971	Philippines	National	ISBN 971-8845-10-0; Francisco Sionil José, Po-On, Solidaridad (1984)
972	Portugal	National	ISBN 972-37-0274-6; Miguel Esteves Cardoso, A Causa das Coisas, Assírio & Alvim (1986)
973	Romania	National	ISBN 973-43-0179-9; Paul Goma, Amnezia la români, Editura Litera (1992)
974	Thailand	National	ISBN 974-85854-7-6 วินทร์ เลียววาริณ, ประชาธิปไตยบนเส้นขนาน, บริษัท 113 (1994)
975	Turkey	National	ISBN 975-293-381-5; Türkçe Sevmek: Türkiye'de Yaşayan Yabancı Kadınların Gözüyle Türkler, Doğan Kitap (2005)
976	Caribbean Community	Regional	ISBN 976-640-140-3; Joyce Sparer Adler, Exploring the Palace of the Peacock: Essays on Wilson Harris, University of the West Indies Press (2003)
977	Egypt	National	ISBN 977-734-520-8
978	Nigeria	National	ISBN 978-37186-2-2; Jeff Unaegbu, This Lagos Nawa, Prize Publishers (2005)
979	Indonesia	National	ISBN 979-553-483-1; Toeti Heraty, Nostalgi, transendensi, Gramedia Widiasarana Indonesia (1995)
980	Venezuela	National	ISBN 980-01-0194-2; Luis Felipe Ramón y Rivera, La Poesía folklórica de Venezuela Monte Avila (1992)
981	Singapore	National	ISBN 981-3018-39-9; Dato' Sham Sani (ed.), The Encyclopedia of Malaysia (vol. 1), Archipelago Press (1998)
982	South Pacific	Regional	ISBN 982-301-001-3; Anirudh Singh, Silent Warriors, Fiji Institute of Applied Studies (1991)
983	Malaysia	National	ISBN 983-52-0157-9; Mohaini Mohamed, Great Muslim Mathematicians, Penerbit Universiti Teknologi Malaysia (2000)
984	Bangladesh	National	ISBN 984-458-089-7 নির্মলেন্দু গুণ, আনন্দ উদ্যান, সময় প্রকাশনী (1995)
985	Belarus	National	ISBN 978-985-6740-48-3; Larysa Hienijuš, Каб вы ведалі: З эпісталярнай спадчыны (1945-1983), Лімарыус (2005)
986	Taiwan	National	ISBN 986-417-191-7 黃效文, 自然在心/Nature at heart, Commonwealth Publishing Group (2003)
987	Argentina	National	ISBN 987-98184-2-3; Claudio Canaparo, Ciencia y escritura, Zibaldone Editores (2003)
988	Hong Kong	National	ISBN 978-988-00-3827-3; David Bunton, More Common English Errors in Hong Kong, Pearson Education Asia (2011)
989	Portugal	National	ISBN 978-989-758-246-2; Proceedings of the 13th International Conference on Web Information Systems and Technologies, SciTePress (2017)
990~998	see #Prefixes of length 4		
999	see #Prefixes of length 5		

=== Prefixes of length 4 ===
Reg. group	Country, region, or language area	Type	ISBN example (book)
8000~9499	see #Prefixes of length 2		
9500~9899	see #Prefixes of length 3		
9900~9904	unallocated		
9905	Nepal	National	
9906	Tajikistan	National	
9907	Ecuador	National	
9908	Estonia	National	
9909	Tunisia	National	
9910	Uzbekistan	National	ISBN 978-9910-730-59-7; Surxon vohasi ziyorat turizmi salohiyati va uni rivojlantirish istiqbollari, Lesson Press (2023)
9911	Montenegro	National	ISBN 978-9911-554-02-4; Irma Muhović & Andrijana Mićanović, Vodič kroz svijet vodozemaca Crne Gore, Crnogorsko društvo ekolog (2023)
9912	Tanzania	National	ISBN 978-9912-40-076-4; Flower E. Msuya, Ivy Matoju, Amelia Buriyo & Sadock Rusekwa, Coping with Climate Change to Safeguard the Seaweed Industry in Eastern Africa: Spotlight on Tanzania, United Nations University Institute on Comparative Regional Integration Studies (2022)
9913	Uganda	National	ISBN 978-9913-600-00-2; National Coordination Mechanism for Youth Programmes, Uganda Ministry for Gender, Labour, and Social Development (2021)
9914	Kenya	National	ISBN 978-9914-700-82-4; Using Our Traditions: A Herbal and Nutritional Guide for Kenyan Families, Ticah (2020)
9915	Uruguay	National	ISBN 978-9915-9360-7-9; Prohibido el acceso, Solazul Ediciones (2021)
9916	Estonia	National	ISBN 978-9916-9565-0-2; Cyber Threats and NATO 2030: Horizon Scanning and Analysis, NATO Cooperative Cyber Defence Centre of Excellence Publications (2020)
9917	Bolivia	National	ISBN 978-9917-605-00-3; La acumulación originaria de capital en Bolivia 1825-1855: Ensayo sobre la articulación feudal-capitalista, Plural editores (2021)
9918	Malta	National	ISBN 978-9918-21-064-0; A hundred experiences of a bird photographer in Malta, BDL Publishing (2020)
9919	Mongolia	National	
9920	Morocco	National	
9921	Kuwait	National	
9922	Iraq	National	
9923	Jordan	National	
9924	Cambodia	National	
9925	Cyprus	National	
9926	Bosnia and Herzegovina	National	
9927	Qatar	National	
9928	Albania	National	ISBN 978-9928-4005-2-9; Idlir Azizi, Terxhuman, Zenit Editions (2010)
9929	Guatemala	National	ISBN 978-9929-8016-4-6; Héctor Gaitán A., La Calle: Donde tú vives (vol. 8), Librerías Artemis Edinter (2011)
9930	Costa Rica	National	ISBN 978-9930-9431-0-6; Luis Carlos de Rojas Rojas, Cuentos del Bosque, de la Ciudad y del Espacio, Matfacil (2011)
9931	Algeria	National	
9932	Laos	National	
9933	Syria	National	ISBN 978-9933-10-147-3 (2010) نزار أباظة ، العربــية لغير أبنائها ، القسم الثاني
9934	Latvia	National	ISBN 978-9934-0-1596-0; Žanna Grāfa, Fantastiskas zeķes: Ātri un stilīgi, Zvaigzne ABC (2010)
9935	Iceland	National	
9936	Afghanistan	National	ISBN 978-9936-8044-5-6; The Political Economy Of Education and Health Service Delivery In Afghanistan, Afghanistan Research and Evaluation Unit (2016)
9937	Nepal	National	
9938	Tunisia	National	ISBN 978-9938-01-122-7; Hédi Baccouche, En toute franchise, Sud Éditions (2018)
9939	Armenia	National	
9940	Montenegro	National	
9941	Georgia	National	
9942	Ecuador	National	
9943	Uzbekistan	National	
9944	Turkey	National	
9945	Dominican Republic	National	
9946	North Korea	National	ISBN 978-9946-01060-1; Supreme Leader Kim Jong-un In The Year 2012, Foreign Languages Publishing House (2014)
9947	Algeria	National	
9948	United Arab Emirates	National	
9949	Estonia	National	ISBN 978-9949-33-063-8; Robert Kurvitz, Püha ja õudne lõhn, ZA/UM (2013)
9950	Palestine	National	ISBN 978-9950-974-40-1; Sharif Prof. Dr. Norman Ali Bassam Ali Taher Mohammad Ahmad Ahmad Mostafa Khalaf, The Family of Sharif Hajji Taher Mohammad Ahmad Ahmad Mostafa Khalaf (Abu Othman). A Pictorial History Book of a Palestinian Family from Jaffa in the Twentieth Century, Prof. Dr. Norman Khalaf Department for Environmental Research and Media, National Research Center, University of Palestine, Gaza, State of Palestine (2018)
9951	Kosovo	National	
9952	Azerbaijan	National	
9953	Lebanon	National	
9954	Morocco	National	
9955	Lithuania	National	
9956	Cameroon	National	
9957	Jordan	National	
9958	Bosnia and Herzegovina	National	
9959	Libya	National	
9960	Saudi Arabia	National	
9961	Algeria	National	
9962	Panama	National	
9963	Cyprus	National	ISBN 9963-645-06-2; Παύλος Ευδοκίμωφ, Η τρελή αγάπη του Θεού, Κέντρο Μελετών Ιεράς Μονής Κύκκου (2003)
9964	Ghana	National	ISBN 978-9964-70-153-6; Once Upon a Time in Ghana: Traditional Stories Retold in English, Afram (2013)-->
9965	Kazakhstan	National	ISBN 978-9965-854-50-7; Turkic Runic Inscription on the Silver Cup from the Issyk Burial Mound of V-IV Centuries BC, Baur (2019)
9966	Kenya	National	ISBN 978-9966-003-15-7; The Preachers of a Different Gospel: A Pilgrim's Reflections on Contemporary Trends in Christianity, Zondervan Academic (2011)
9967	Kyrgyzstan	National	
9968	Costa Rica	National	
9969	Algeria	National	
9970	Uganda	National	
9971	Singapore	National	
9972	Peru	National	
9973	Tunisia	National	
9974	Uruguay	National	
9975	Moldova	National	
9976	Tanzania	National	
9977	Costa Rica	National	
9978	Ecuador	National	
9979	Iceland	National	
9980	Papua New Guinea	National	ISBN 978-9980-911-89-6; Papua New Guinea’s Enhanced Nationally Determined Contribution 2020, Climate Change and Development Authority (2020)
9981	Morocco	National	
9982	Zambia	National	
9983	Gambia	National	
9984	Latvia	National	
9985	Estonia	National	
9986	Lithuania	National	ISBN 9986-16-329-3; Jurga Ivanauskaitė, Pakalnučių metai, Tyto alba (2014)
9987	Tanzania	National	
9988	Ghana	National	
9989	North Macedonia	National	ISBN 978-9989-2182-3-1; Macedonia: The Conflict and the Media, Macedonian Institute for Media (2003)
9990~9999	see #Prefixes of length 5		

=== Prefixes of length 5 ===
Reg. group	Country, region, or language area	Type	ISBN example (book)
60000~60999	see #Prefixes of length 3		
61000~61099	unallocated		
61100~63599	see #Prefixes of length 3		
63600~64999	unallocated		
65000~66999	see #Prefixes of length 2		
67000~69989	unallocated		
69990	Zambia	National	
69991~69999	unallocated		
70000~79999	see #Prefixes of length 1		
80000~94999	see #Prefixes of length 2		
95000~98999	see #Prefixes of length 3		
99000~99049	unallocated		
99050~99899	see #Prefixes of length 4		
99900	unallocated		
99901	Bahrain	National	
99902	Reserved Agency (was Gabon)	Other	
99903	Mauritius	National	ISBN 978-99903-30-00-7; Civilisation mauricienne et valeurs morales: Lettre pastorale de Carême 1993 (L'église aujourd'hui), Diocèse de Port-Louis (2013)
99904	Curaçao (was Netherlands Antilles, and Aruba)	National	
99905	Bolivia	National	
99906	Kuwait	National	
99907	unallocated		
99908	Malawi	National	
99909	Malta	National	
99910	Sierra Leone	National	
99911	Lesotho	National	
99912	Botswana	National	
99913	Andorra	National	
99914	Suriname	National	
99915	Maldives	National	
99916	Namibia	National	
99917	Brunei	National	
99918	Faroe Islands	National	ISBN 978-99918-65-51-5; Firouz Gaini, Lessons of Islands: Place and Identity in the Faroe Islands, Faroe University Press (2013)
99919	Benin	National	
99920	Andorra	National	ISBN 9789992020005; La llengua catalana a Andorra: Estudi dialectològic dels seus parlars rurals, Institut d'Estudis Andorrans, Centre de Barcelona (1992)-->
99921	Qatar	National	
99922	Guatemala	National	
99923	El Salvador	National	
99924	Nicaragua	National	
99925	Paraguay	National	
99926	Honduras	National	
99927	Albania	National	
99928	Georgia	National	
99929	Mongolia	National	
99930	Armenia	National	
99931	Seychelles	National	
99932	Malta	National	
99933	Nepal	National	
99934	Dominican Republic	National	
99935	Haiti	National	
99936	Bhutan	National	
99937	Macau	National	ISBN 978-99937-1-056-1; Lúcio de Sousa, The Early European Presence in China, Japan, the Philippines and Southeast Asia (1555-1590) - The Life of Bartolomeu Landeiro, Fundação Macau (2010)
99938	Republika Srpska	National	
99939	Guatemala	National	
99940	Georgia	National	
99941	Armenia	National	
99942	Sudan	National	
99943	Albania	National	
99944	Ethiopia	National	
99945	Namibia	National	ISBN 978-99945-76-51-7; Antje Burke, 111 Roadside Plants, Namibian Scientific Society (2017)
99946	Nepal	National	
99947	Tajikistan	National	
99948	Eritrea	National	
99949	Mauritius	National	
99950	Cambodia	National	
99951	Reserved Agency (was Democratic Republic of Congo)	Other	
99952	Mali	National	
99953	Paraguay	National	
99954	Bolivia	National	
99955	Republika Srpska	National	
99956	Albania	National	
99957	Malta	National	
99958	Bahrain	National	
99959	Luxembourg	National	
99960	Malawi	National	
99961	El Salvador	National	
99962	Mongolia	National	
99963	Cambodia	National	
99964	Nicaragua	National	
99965	Macau	National	ISBN 978-99965-2-047-1 宋錫祥 Song Xixiang, 莊金鋒 Zhuang Jinfeng et al., "一國兩制"與中國區際民商事司法協助 "One Country, Two Systems" and Regional Civil and Commercial Judicial Assistance in China, Instituto Politécnico de Macau (2012)
99966	Kuwait	National	
99967	Paraguay	National	
99968	Botswana	National	
99969	Oman	National	
99970	Haiti	National	
99971	Myanmar	National	
99972	Faroe Islands	National	
99973	Mongolia	National	
99974	Bolivia	National	
99975	Tajikistan	National	
99976	Republika Srpska	National	
99977	Rwanda	National	
99978	Mongolia	National	
99979	Honduras	National	
99980	Bhutan	National	
99981	Macau	National	
99982	Benin	National	
99983	El Salvador	National	
99984	Brunei	National	
99985	Tajikistan	National	
99986	Myanmar	National	
99987	Luxembourg	National	
99988	Sudan	National	
99989	Paraguay	National	
99990	Ethiopia	National	
99991	Burkina Faso	National	
99992	Oman	National	
99993	Mauritius	National	
99994	Haiti	National	
99995	Seychelles	National	
99996	Macau	National	
99997	Republika Srpska	National	
99998	Namibia	National	
99999	unallocated		

=== Distribution ===
Length	Allocated	Unallocated	Unallocated list
1	7 (100%)	No	-
2	17 (85%)	3 (15%)	64, 67~68
3	75 (84%)	14 (16%)	610, 636~639, 690~698
4	85 (86%)	14 (14%)	6990~6998, 9900~9904
5	98 (89%)	12 (11%)	69991~69999, 99900, 99907, 99999
total	282 (87%)	43 (13%)	

=== Countries by language area ===
Country	English 0	English 1	French 2	German 3
Australia	✓	✓		
Austria				✓
Belgium			✓	
Bermuda	✓	✓		
Canada	✓	✓	✓	
Eswatini	✓	✓		
France			✓	
Germany				✓
Gibraltar	✓	✓		
Ireland	✓	✓		
Liechtenstein				✓
Luxembourg			✓	✓
Namibia	✓			
New Zealand	✓	✓		
South Africa	✓	✓		
Switzerland			✓	✓
United Kingdom	✓	✓		
United States of America	✓	✓		
Zimbabwe	✓	✓		

=== Countries in broader registration groups ===
5: former USSR (14)
Armenia, Azerbaijan, Belarus, Estonia, Georgia, Kazakhstan, Kyrgyzstan, Latvia, Lithuania, Moldova, Russia, Tajikistan, Ukraine, Uzbekistan

80: former Czechoslovakia (2)
Czech Republic, Slovakia

86: former Yugoslavia (7)
Bosnia and Herzegovina, Croatia, Montenegro, North Macedonia, Republika Srpska, Serbia, Slovenia

976: Caribbean Community (5)
The Bahamas, Barbados, Belize, Jamaica, Trinidad and Tobago

982: South Pacific (14)
Cook Islands, Federated States of Micronesia, Fiji, Kiribati, Marshall Islands, Nauru, Niue, Palau, Papua New Guinea, Samoa, Solomon Islands, Tonga, Tuvalu, and Vanuatu

=== Countries with no exclusive registration group ===
19 countries
Australia, Austria, Belgium, Bermuda, Canada, Czech Republic, Eswatini, Germany, Gibraltar, Ireland, Liechtenstein, New Zealand, Russia, Serbia, Slovakia, South Africa, Switzerland, United Kingdom, Zimbabwe

=== Countries with multiple registration groups ===
In parentheses, how many numbers are available.

Countries with over one million numbers are highlighted.

Two (52 countries)
Andorra (2×10^{4}), Bahrain (2×10^{4}), Benin (2×10^{4}), Bhutan (2×10^{4}), Bosnia and Herzegovina (20×10^{4}), Botswana (2×10^{4}), Brazil (2000×10^{4}), Brunei (2×10^{4}), Bulgaria (200×10^{4}), Colombia (200×10^{4}), Cyprus (20×10^{4}), Dominican Republic (11×10^{4}), Egypt (200×10^{4}), Ethiopia (2×10^{4}), Faroe Islands (2×10^{4}), Finland (200×10^{4}), Ghana (20×10^{4}), Greece (200×10^{4}), Honduras (2×10^{4}), Hong Kong (200×10^{4}), Hungary (200×10^{4}), Iceland (20×10^{4}), India (2000×10^{4}), Jordan (20×10^{4}), Kazakhstan (110×10^{4}), Kenya (20×10^{4}), Latvia (20×10^{4}), Lebanon (110×10^{4}), Luxembourg (2×10^{4}), Malawi (2×10^{4}), Montenegro (20×10^{4}), Myanmar (2×10^{4}), Netherlands (2000×10^{4}), Nicaragua (2×10^{4}), North Macedonia (110×10^{4}), Oman (2×10^{4}), Pakistan (200×10^{4}), Peru (110×10^{4}), Philippines (200×10^{4}), Portugal (200×10^{4}), Qatar (11×10^{4}), Saudi Arabia (110×10^{4}), Seychelles (2×10^{4}), Singapore (110×10^{4}), Sri Lanka (200×10^{4}), Sudan (2×10^{4}), Uganda (20×10^{4}), Ukraine (200×10^{4}), Uruguay (20×10^{4}), Uzbekistan (20×10^{4}), Vietnam (200×10^{4}), Zambia (11×10^{4})

Three (20 countries)
Argentina (300×10^{4}), Armenia (12×10^{4}), Cambodia (12×10^{4}), Costa Rica (30×10^{4}), Ecuador (30×10^{4}), El Salvador (3×10^{4}), Georgia (12×10^{4}), Guatemala (12×10^{4}), Haiti (3×10^{4}), Kuwait (12×10^{4}), Lithuania (120×10^{4}), Malaysia (300×10^{4}), Mexico (300×10^{4}), Morocco (30×10^{4}), Namibia (3×10^{4}), Romania (300×10^{4}), Taiwan (300×10^{4}), Tanzania (30×10^{4}), Thailand (300×10^{4}), Tunisia (30×10^{4})

Four (13 countries)
Albania (13×10^{4}), Algeria (40×10^{4}), Bolivia (13×10^{4}), Estonia (40×10^{4}), Indonesia (400×10^{4}), Iran (400×10^{4}), Macau (4×10^{4}), Malta (13×10^{4}), Nepal (22×10^{4}), Paraguay (4×10^{4}), Republika Srpska (4×10^{4}), Tajikistan (13×10^{4}), Turkey (310×10^{4})

Five (2 countries)
Mauritius (203×10^{4}), Mongolia (14×10^{4})

=== ISBN vs UN ===
UN countries not part of ISBN (36)
Angola, Antigua and Barbuda, Burundi, Cape Verde, Central African Republic, Chad, Comoros, Democratic Republic of the Congo (formerly "99951-"), Republic of the Congo, Côte d'Ivoire, Djibouti, Dominica, Equatorial Guinea, Gabon (formerly "99902-"), Grenada, Guinea, Guinea-Bissau, Guyana, Liberia, Madagascar, Mauritania, Monaco, Mozambique, Niger, Saint Kitts and Nevis, Saint Lucia, Saint Vincent and the Grenadines, San Marino, São Tomé and Príncipe, Senegal, Somalia, South Sudan, East Timor, Togo, Turkmenistan, Yemen

ISBN agencies not part of the UN (10)
Bermuda, Curaçao, Faroe Islands, Gibraltar, Hong Kong, Kosovo, Macau, Palestine, Republic of Srpska, Taiwan

== With 979- prefix ==
Reg. group	Country, region, or language area	Type	ISBN example (book)
0-	reserved for ISMN		
10-	France	National	ISBN 979-10-90636-07-1; Hélène Dubouis, Les Jeunes dans la société, Éditions des Citoyens
11-	South Korea	National	ISBN 979-11-86178-14-0; Edward Y. J. Chung, Korean Confucianism: Tradition and Modernity. Academy of Korean Studies (2015)
12-	Italy	National	ISBN 979-12-200-0852-5; Lorenzo Pacini, L'arte la vita e un pizzico di Van Gogh, Edizioni d'Arte (2016)
13-	Spain	National	ISBN 979-13-7006-019-0; Raúl Terol & Ana Quintero Cabello, Acercando el futuro a los estudiantes de ciencias de la salud, Dykinson (2025)
14~19-	unallocated, shared with ISMN		
2~7-	unallocated, shared with ISMN		
8-	United States of America	National	ISBN 979-8-6024-0545-3; Julia Clemens, Sunset on Whisling Island
9-	unallocated, shared with ISMN		

== See also ==
- International Standard Book Number
- International Standard Serial Number
- List of group-0 ISBN publisher codes
- List of group-1 ISBN publisher codes
- List of GS1 country codes
