= List of group-1 ISBN publisher codes =

A list of publisher codes for (978) International Standard Book Numbers with a group code of one. (Data from published items by these publishers.)

== Assignment ==
The group-1 publisher codes are assigned as follows:

Publisher number	Item number	Group identifier				Total possible books
Publisher number	Item number	From	To	Number of possible publisher codes	Books per publisher	Total possible books
2 digits	6 digits	1-01-xxxxxx-x 1-05-xxxxxx-x	1-02-xxxxxx-x 1-05-xxxxxx-x	3 (0.00090%)	1,000,000	3,000,000 (3.0%)
3 digits	5 digits	1-000-xxxxx-x 1-030-xxxxx-x 1-040-xxxxx-x 1-047-xxxxx-x 1-100-xxxxx-x 1-714-xxxxx-x	1-009-xxxxx-x 1-034-xxxxx-x 1-045-xxxxx-x 1-047-xxxxx-x 1-397-xxxxx-x 1-716-xxxxx-x	323 (0.097%)	100,000	32,300,000 (32%)
4 digits	4 digits	1-0350-xxxx-x 1-0460-xxxx-x 1-0480-xxxx-x 1-0700-xxxx-x 1-3980-xxxx-x 1-6500-xxxx-x 1-6860-xxxx-x 1-7170-xxxx-x 1-7620-xxxx-x 1-7900-xxxx-x 1-8672-xxxx-x 1-9730-xxxx-x	1-0399-xxxx-x 1-0469-xxxx-x 1-0499-xxxx-x 1-0999-xxxx-x 1-5499-xxxx-x 1-6799-xxxx-x 1-7139-xxxx-x 1-7319-xxxx-x 1-7634-xxxx-x 1-7999-xxxx-x 1-8675-xxxx-x 1-9877-xxxx-x	2,897 (0.87%)	10,000	28,970,000 (29%)
5 digits	3 digits	1-55000-xxx-x 1-68000-xxx-x 1-74000-xxx-x 1-76500-xxx-x 1-77540-xxx-x 1-77650-xxx-x 1-77830-xxx-x 1-80000-xxx-x 1-83850-xxx-x 1-86760-xxx-x	1-64999-xxx-x 1-68599-xxx-x 1-76199-xxx-x 1-77499-xxx-x 1-77639-xxx-x 1-77699-xxx-x 1-78999-xxx-x 1-83799-xxx-x 1-86719-xxx-x 1-86979-xxx-x	22,010 (6.6%)	1,000	22,010,000 (22%)
6 digits	2 digits	1-869800-xx-x 1-916506-xx-x 1-916908-xx-x 1-919565-xx-x 1-919655-xx-x 1-987800-xx-x 1-991200-xx-x	1-915999-xx-x 1-916869-xx-x 1-919163-xx-x 1-919599-xx-x 1-972999-xx-x 1-991149-xx-x 1-998989-xx-x	113,340 (34%)	100	11,334,000 (11%)
7 digits	1 digit	1-0643250-x-x 1-7320000-x-x 1-7635000-x-x 1-7750000-x-x 1-7764000-x-x 1-7770000-x-x 1-8380000-x-x 1-9160000-x-x 1-9168700-x-x 1-9191640-x-x 1-9196000-x-x 1-9911500-x-x 1-9989900-x-x	1-0699999-x-x 1-7399999-x-x 1-7649999-x-x 1-7753999-x-x 1-7764999-x-x 1-7782999-x-x 1-8384999-x-x 1-9165059-x-x 1-9169079-x-x 1-9195649-x-x 1-9196549-x-x 1-9911999-x-x 1-9999999-x-x	195,350 (58%)	10	1,953,500 (1.9%)
unallocated		1-060000-xx-x	1-064324-xx-x	n/a		432,500
Total Possible Group-1 Codes:				333,923	≈298	99,567,500

== 2-digit publisher codes ==
Publisher code	Publisher	Additional imprints	Notes
00	see #3-digit publisher codes		
01	Pyramid Books		e.g. ISBN 1-01-502772-5
02	Berkley Publishing		e.g. ISBN 1-02-541870-0
03	see #3-digit publisher codes and #4-digit publisher codes		
04	see #3-digit publisher codes and #4-digit publisher codes		
05	DAW Books		e.g. ISBN 1-05-100237-0
06	Uncertain	Celestial Publications	e.g. ISBN 1-06-834424-5
06	see #7-digit publisher codes		
07~09	see #4-digit publisher codes		

== 3-digit publisher codes ==
Publisher code	Publisher	Additional imprints	Notes
000	Auerbach	an imprint of CRC Press	United Kingdom
002, 003	Forgotten Books		
004~009	?		
010~029	see #2-digit publisher codes		
030~032	?		
033	Forgotten Books		
034	?		
035~039	see #4-digit publisher codes		
040~045	?		
046	see #4-digit publisher codes		
047	?		
048~049	see #4-digit publisher codes		
050~059	see #2-digit publisher codes		
060~063	unallocated		
064~069	see #7-digit publisher codes		
070~099	see #4-digit publisher codes		
100	?		
101	Tundra Books	An imprint of Penguin Random House Canada Young Readers a Penguin Random House Company	
105	Lulu.com		
107	Cambridge University Press		
108	Cambridge University Press		
111	Delmar		
118	For Dummies		
135	Auerbach	an imprint of CRC Press	United Kingdom
138	Routledge		
150–154	General Books, LLC		Memphis, Tennessee, US; Also: 1-4432, 1-4589, 1-4590, 1-77045
178	Verso		
241	Penguin Books		Penguin Random House
226	University of Chicago Press		
250	St. Martin's Press		New York
257, 300, 304, 312	Lulu		
315	Auerbach	an imprint of CRC Press	United Kingdom
319	MacMillan		
329	Lulu		
330–334	Forgotten Books		
337	Cengage		
338	Scholastic	Since 2016	
349	Springer Nature	Palgrave Macmillan	For instance ISBN 9781349075379.
350	Bloomsbury Academic ebooks		
351	Taylor & Francis ebooks	Routledge, CRC Press	Registered to Auerbach.
352	Springer Nature ebooks	Red Globe Press, Palgrave Macmillan, Macmillan	For instance ISBN 9781352002188.
364	Blurb, Inc.		
365	Lulu	For instance ISBN 9781387423521.	
366, 367	Blurb		
368	Disney	Los Angeles, CA	
386	Stark Publishing	Furry Muse Publications; various self-publishing brands.	For instance ISBN 9781386544029.
387	Lulu		
388, 389	Blurb		
390, 391, 396, 397	Forgotten Books	FB&C	For instance ISBN 9781390963151, ISBN 9781396787041.
398~549	see #4-digit publisher codes		
550~649	see #5-digit publisher codes		
650~679	see #4-digit publisher codes		
680~685	see #5-digit publisher codes		
686~713	see #4-digit publisher codes		
714~715	?		
716	Lulu		
717~999	see #4-digit publisher codes, #5-digit publisher codes, #6-digit publisher codes, and #7-digit publisher codes		

== 4-digit publisher codes ==
Publisher code	Publisher	Additional imprints	Notes
0000~0099	see #3-digit publisher codes		
0100~0299	see #2-digit publisher codes		
0300~0349	see #3-digit publisher codes		
0350~0399	?		
0400~0459	see #3-digit publisher codes		
0460~0469	?		
0470~0479	see #3-digit publisher codes		
0480~0499	?		
0500~0599	see #2-digit publisher codes		
0600~0642	unallocated		
0643~0699	see #7-digit publisher codes		
0700~0717	?		
0718	SAGE Publications	CQ Press	For example ISBN 978-1-0718-2217-3.
0989	Stanhope Books		Hertfordshire, UK
0990~0999	?		
1000~3979	see #3-digit publisher codes		
3980~3999	?		
4000	Random House	Anchor Books; Vintage Books; Alfred A. Knopf; Crown Publishing Group	
4001	Tantor Media		
4002–4003	Thomas Nelson		
4008	Princeton University Press		
4009	Dateworks		
4010	Xlibris		
4012	DC Comics	Vertigo	New York
4013	Miramax Books	Hyperion	
4016	Thomas Nelson	Rutledge Hill Press	
4018	Delmar Cengage Learning		
4019	Hay House		
4020	Springer		Netherlands and Berlin office
4021	Adamant Media Corporation		Boston, US
4022	Sourcebooks		Naperville, IL, USA
4024	Practising Law Institute		
4025	Recorded Books		
4026	Waterford Institute of Technology	Pearson Digital Learning	
4027	Sterling Publishing		New York, US
4039	Palgrave Macmillan		
4049	Columbia TriStar Home Entertainment		
4050	Macmillan Publishers		London, UK
4051	Blackwell Publishing		Oxford, England, UK
4052	Egmont UK		London, England, UK
4053	Dorling Kindersley		London, UK
4054	Parragon	Bath	Often improperly spaced (40544- and 40547-)
4055	Time Warner Audiobooks		
4057	LexisNexis		London, England, UK
4058	Pearson Education		Harlow, UK
4071	Scholastic		New York, USA
4073	Archeopress		Oxford, England
4075	Parragon		Bath, UK
4080	Cengage Learning		Boston, Massachusetts, USA
4081	Bloomsbury Publishing	John Wisden & Co.	London, England
4088	Bloomsbury Publishing		London, UK
4089	Harlequin	Mills & Boon	possibly only used for their ebooks
4091	Orion Books		London, UK
4093	Dorling Kindersley		London, UK
4098	Department for Communities and Local Government		London, UK
4099	Dodo Press		Gloucester, England
4102	University Press of the Pacific or, occasionally, Combat Studies Institute and USACGSS		Combat Studies Institute and USACGSS are located at Fort Leavenworth, KS, US
4107	Authorhouse		
4114	Spark Publishing		New York, US, aka Sparknotes, a subsidiary of Barnes and Noble.
4116	Lulu		
4120	Trafford		Victoria, British Columbia, Canada
4127	Publications International		Lincolnwood, Illinois, US
4128	Transaction Publishers		New Brunswick, New Jersey, US
4129	SAGE Publications	Pine Forge Press, Corwin Press	Los Angeles, California, US
4133	U.S. Government, Dept. of Interior		Found on DOI report
4134	Xlibris		Bloomington, Indiana, US; Print on demand
4139	A.D. Vision, Inc.		
4143	Tyndale House		
4157	Paramount Pictures/DreamWorks Animation		
4158	LifeWay Press		
4160	Saunders		Philadelphia, Pennsylvania, US; Imprint of Elsevier
4165	Simon & Schuster		
4169	Simon & Schuster		New York, US
4170	Universal Studios		
4185	Thomas Nelson		
4196	BookSurge		Charleston, South Carolina, US; Print on demand
4197	Amulet Books		An imprint of Abrams New York
4198	Warner Bros. Entertainment		
4200	CRC Press		Boca Raton, Florida, US
4210	FUNimation Productions, Ltd.		
4215	VIZ Media		San Francisco, USA
4231	Disney Editions		New York, US
4244	IEEE		
4248	Sony Picture Home Entertainment		
4249	ServiceOntario?		Found on a road map of Ontario
4250	ReadHowYouWant		
4253	Kessinger Publishing		also: 1-56456 and 0-7661
4264	BiblioBazaar, now part of Amazon.com		
4268	Harlequin	Mills & Boon	
4262	National Geographic Society		Washington, D.C.
4278	TOKYOPOP Inc.		
4288	Rico Publications		US
4292	W.H. Freeman and Company		New York, US
4302	Apress		Berkeley, California, USA
4303	Lulu		
4335	Crossway		
4343	AuthorHouse		
4351	Barnes & Noble		New York, US
4354	Cengage Learning		
4357	Lulu		
4359	Sony Picture Home Entertainment		
4377	Saunders	Elsevier imprint	
4384	State University of New York		Albany, New York, US
4331	Peter Lang Publishing		New York, US
4392	Booksurge Publishing		Charleston, South Carolina, US
4398	Productivity Press	Now an imprint of CRC Press	New York, US
4399	Temple University Press		Philadelphia, Pennsylvania, US
4402	F&W Media		Blue Ash, OH
4405	Adams Media / Simon & Schuster		
4419	Springer		
4426	University of Toronto Press		Toronto, Ontario, Canada
4432	General Books, LLC		Memphis, Tennessee, US; Also: 1-150 to 1-154, 1-4589, 1-4590, 1-77045
4438	Cambridge Scholars Publishing		Newcastle, England
4447	Hodder & Stoughton	Sceptre	London, UK
4454	Parragon		Bath, UK
4456	Amberley Publishing		Stroud, UK
4457, 4461	Lulu		
4493	O'Reilly Media		
4509	General Books, LLC		Memphis, Tennessee, US; Also: 1-150 to 1-154, 1-4432, 1-4590, 1-77045
4516	Simon & Schuster		New York City
4530	Bendon Publishing International		Ashland, OH, USA
4576	Bedford-St. Martin's: an imprint of MacMillan		
4583	Lulu		
4590	General Books, LLC		Memphis, Tennessee, US; Also: 1-150 to 1-154, 1-4432, 1-4509, 1-77045
4592	Harlequin		
4627	CrossBooks		A division of LifeWay, 1663 Liberty Drive, Bloomington, IN 47403
4635	Renown Publishing (via Create Space)		Redding, California, US <https://sites.google.com/site/renownpublishing>
4644	Enslow Publishers, Inc.		Berkeley Heights, New Jersey US
4721	Constable		London, UK
4723	Parragon		Bath, UK
4725	Bloomsbury Publishing		London, UK
4729	Bloomsbury Publishing		London, UK
4730	Open University		Milton Keynes, UK
4732	Gollancz	imprint of Orion Publishing Group	London, UK
4736	Hodder & Stoughton		London, UK
4738	Pen and Sword Books		Barnsley, UK
4742	Bloomsbury Publishing		London, UK
4748	Parragon Books		New York, NY, USA
4767	Simon & Schuster		New York, NY
4781	Create Space	Registered as: CreateSpace Independent Publishing Platform	
4810	Create Space	Registered as: CreateSpace Independent Publishing Platform	
4814	Antheneum Books for Young Readers	Simon & Schuster Children's Publishing Division	New York, NY, USA
4834	Lulu		
4843	Tyndale House Publishers		
4847	Disney Press	Disney Book Group	Glendale, CA, USA
4904	Create Space		
4919	O'Reilly Media		
4921	Create Space (via Amazon.com)		
4987	CRC Press	Imprint of Taylor & Francis	Boca Raton, FL, USA
5006	CreateSpace Independent Publishing Platform (via Amazon.com)		For instance ISBN 978-1-5006-5849-6.
5098	Pan Macmillan	Picador	London, UK
5153			For instance ISBN 9781515391340.
5332	Create Space (via Amazon.com)		apparently on behalf of City of Citrus Heights History and Arts Commission
5335	Textbook Solutions		
5341	Sleeping Bear Press	Cherry Lake Pub, Cherry Lake Publishing	For instance ISBN 9781534110311.
5342	Lulu		
5343	Image Comics		For instance ISBN 9781534308602.
5344	Atheneum Books for Young Readers (ebooks)		For instance ISBN 9781534435933.
5345	KidHaven Publishing	Lucent Press, Kidhaven	For instance ISBN 9781534524392.
5351	Createspace Independent Publishing Platform		
5358	Cengage Learning	Gale, Gale and the British Library, other ebooks.	
5359	B&H Books		For instance ISBN 9781535956956.
5361	Nova Science Publishers Inc		For instance ISBN 9781536121131.
5362	Candlewick		For instance ISBN 9781536208870.
5365	Rukia Publishing		For instance ISBN 9781536533682.
5366	Audible Studios on Brilliance audio		For instance ISBN 9781536609813 .
5368–5375	CreateSpace		
5378	Blurb	Jovian Press, Charles River Editors	
5380	Dalcassian Publishing Company		
5381	Rowman & Littlefield Publishers		For instance ISBN 9781538118993.
5382	Gareth Stevens Pub		
5383	Rosen Publishing Group	PowerKids Press, West 44 Books	For instance ISBN 9781538382820.
5384, 5385	Blackstone Pub		For instance ISBN 9781538412633.
5386	IEEE		
5387	Grand Central Pub		For instance ISBN 9781538760116.
5388	Cram101		For instance ISBN 9781538803721.
5392	Thomson Reuters		For instance ISBN 9781539233688.
5393	CreateSpace		
5394	CreateSpace		
5400	Hal Leonard Corporation	Hal Leonard	
5402	History Press Library Editions	Arcadia Publishing, History Press	For instance ISBN 9781540227782.
5407	CreateSpace		
5409	Baker Publishing Group		For instance ISBN 9781540960078.
5412	KDP (was Create Space via Amazon.com)		
5420	KDP? (was Create Space via Amazon.com)		Amazon (apub.com)
5434	Xlibris		For instance ISBN 9781543464450.
5443	SAGE Publications	CQ Press	For instance ISBN 978-1-5443-9020-8.
5445	Houndstooth Press		For instance ISBN 978-1-5445-2158-9.
5446~5499	?		
5500~6499	see #5-digit publisher codes		
6500~6623	?		
6624	Page Publishing		
6671, 6780, 6781	Lulu		
6800~6859	see #5-digit publisher codes		
6860~7139	?		
7140~7169	see #3-digit publisher codes		
7170~7190	?		
7191	Create Space (via Amazon)		
7192~7319	?		
7320~7399	see #7-digit publisher codes		
7400~7619	see #5-digit publisher codes		
7620~7634	?		
7635~7649	see #7-digit publisher codes		
7650~7749	see #5-digit publisher codes		
7750~7753	see #7-digit publisher codes		
7754~7763	see #5-digit publisher codes		
7764	see #7-digit publisher codes		
7765~7769	see #5-digit publisher codes		
7770~7782	see #7-digit publisher codes		
7783~7899	see #5-digit publisher codes		
7900~7946	?		
7947, 7948	Lulu		
7949~7999	?		
8000~8379	see #5-digit publisher codes		
8380~8384	see #7-digit publisher codes		
8385~8671	see #5-digit publisher codes		
8672~8675	?		
8676~8697	see #5-digit publisher codes		
8698~9159	see #6-digit publisher codes		
9160~916505	see #7-digit publisher codes		
916506~91686	see #6-digit publisher codes		
91687~916907	see #7-digit publisher codes		
916908~919163	see #6-digit publisher codes		
919164~919564	see #7-digit publisher codes		
919565~9195	see #6-digit publisher codes		
91960~919654	see #7-digit publisher codes		
919655~9729	see #6-digit publisher codes		
9730~9746	?		
9747	VIZ Media		San Francisco, USA
9753	Yen Press		New York City, USA
9754~9877	?		
9878~99114	see #6-digit publisher codes		
99115~99119	see #7-digit publisher codes		
9912~99898	see #6-digit publisher codes		
99899~9999	see #7-digit publisher codes		

== 5-digit publisher codes ==
Publisher code	Publisher	Notes
50000~54999	see #4-digit publisher codes	
55000~55021	?	
55022	ECW Press	Toronto, Ontario, Canada
55041	Fitzhenry & Whiteside Ltd.	Markham, Ontario, Canada
55046	Boston Mill Press	Erin, Ontario, Canada
55054	Douglas & McIntyre	Vancouver, British Columbia, Canada
55081	Breakwater Books Ltd.	
55105	Lone Pine Publishing	
55111	Broadview Press	
55125	Van Well Publishing	Vancouver, British Columbia, Canada
55164	Black Rose Books	Montreal, Quebec, Canada; London, UK
55166	MIRA; Harlequin	
55186	Polestar Calendars Ltd.	Winlaw, British Columbia, Canada
55198	MapArt	Oshawa, Ontario, Canada
55209	Firefly Books	
55245	Coach House Books	Toronto, Ontario, Canada
55263	Key Porter Books	Toronto, Ontario, Canada; also 1-55267
55267	Key Porter Books (Prospero Books)	Vancouver, British Columbia, Canada; also 1-55263
55278	McArthur & Co	Toronto, Ontario, Canada
55285	Whitecap Books	North Vancouver, British Columbia, Canada
55297	Firefly Books	Buffalo, New York, US
55322	Captus Press	Concord, Ontario, Canada (earlier Toronto, ON, Canada)
55380	Ronsdale Press	Vancouver, British Columbia, Canada
55407	Firefly Books	Buffalo, New York, US/Richmond Hill, ON, Canada
55444	Quality Special Products	
55486	Canadian Cartographics Corporation	Markham, Ontario, Canada
55488	Dundurn Press	Toronto, Ontario, Canada
55553	Northeastern University Press	Boston, MA, USA
55570	Neal-Schuman Publishers	New York, US
55583	Alyson Books	Los Angeles, California; Boston, Massachusetts, US; also 0-932870
55587	Lynne Rienner Publishers	Boulder, Colorado, US
55597	Graywolf Press	St. Paul, Minnesota, US
55615	Microsoft Press	Redmond, Washington, US
55634	Steve Jackson Games, Inc.	Austin, Texas, US
55642	SLACK Incorporated	Thorofare, New Jersey, US
55652	A Cappella Book	imprint of Chicago Review Press, Inc.
55665	Fireside Bibles	
55704	Newmarket Press	New York, US
55722	Warner Home Video, Incorporated	
55725	Paraclete Press	
55739	Blair and Associates	
55742	Starmont House, Inc (also Borgo Press)	Mercer Island, Washington, US
55748	Barbour Books	
55748	Barbour Books	
55750	Naval Institute Press	Annapolis, Maryland, USA
55783	Applause Books	New York, US
55788	HPBooks	New York, US
55793	The Guild Bindery Press	Germantown, TN, USA
55821	The Lyons Press	New York, US
55832	The Harvard Common Press	
55840	The Criterion Collection/Janus Films	
55849	University of Massachusetts Press	Amherst, Massachusetts, US
55851	M&T Publishing	Redwood City, California, US
55852	National Press Publications	Shawnee Mission, Kansas, US
55860	Morgan Kaufmann Publishers	Burlington, Massachusetts, US
55861	The Feminist Press	New York City, US
55870	F+W	Cincinnati, Ohio, and New York City, US
55890	Buena Vista Home Entertainment, Inc.	
55902	Aerie Books Ltd.	
55963	Island Press	Washington, Covelo, London
55972	Birch Lane Press	Was part of the bankrupted Carol Publishing Group, whose assets were purchased by Kensington Publishing in 2000
56013	Olde Soldier Books	Gaithersburg, Maryland, US
56039	Warner Home Video	
56076	Wizards of the Coast	formerly TSR, Inc. (aka TSR Hobbies, aka Tactical Studies Rules) also assigned other ISBN 0- and 1- publisher codes
56085	Signature Books	Salt Lake City, Utah, US
56098	Smithsonian Institution Press	Washington DC, US
56101	Cowley	Cambridge, Massachusetts, US
56138	Courage Books	Philadelphia, Pennsylvania, US
56145	Peachtree Publishers	Atlanta, Georgia, US
56159	Macmillan	London
56173	Publications International	Lincolnwood, Illinois, US
56205	New Riders	
56219	Central Park Media	
56239	ABDO Publishing Company	Minneapolis, Minnesota
56261	Avalon Travel Publishing	Emeryville, California, US
56333	Masquerade Books; Rhinoceros Books; Rosebud Books	
56367	Fairchild Books Inc.	New York, US
56389	DC Comics	New York, US
56456	Kessinger Publishing	also: 1-4253 and 0-7661
56458	Dorling Kindersley	New York, US
56476	Chariot Victor Publishing, now part of David C. Cook	
56496	Rockport Publishing	
56512	Algonquin Books	Chapel Hill
56545	Music Educators National Conference	Reston, Virginia, US
56548	New City Press	
56554	Pelican Publishing Company	Gretna, LA, USA
56563	Hendrickson Publishers	
56567	AnimEigo	
56591	Hollym International Corp. Hollym (publishing house)	Elizabeth, New Jersey, US and Seoul, Korea
56592	O'Reilly Media	
56605	Rhino Home Video	
56608	Meriweather Publishing	Englewood, Colorado, US
56686	Brady Games	Indianapolis, Indiana, US
56698	ACTEX Publications	Winsted, Connecticut, US
56726	Management Concepts	Vienna, Virginia, US
56730	New Yorker Video	from a DVD
56733	Clairmont Press	Lilburn, Georgia
56792	David R. Godine, Publisher	Boston, Massachusetts, US
56793	HAP/AUPHA: Health Administration Press / Association of University Programs in Health Administration	Chicago, IL
56821	Jason Aronson	imprint of Rowman & Littlefield Publishers
56836	Kodanska International	New York, US
56849	Buccaneer	
56854	Liturgy Training Publications	
56881	A. K. Peters	Wellesley, Massachusetts, US
56929	Pastoral Press, now part of Oregon Catholic Press	
56931	VIZ Media	San Francisco, USA
56955	Charis Books	
56975	Ulysses Press	Berkeley, California, US
56976	Chicago Review Press	Chicago, Illinois, US
56980	Barricade Books, Inc.	
57008	Deseret Book	Salt Lake City, Utah, US; also 0-87579 and 1-59038
57032	Nozomi Entertainment/RightStuf!	
57035	Sopris West Educational Services	Longmont, Colorado, US
57058	Ignatius Press	
57075	Orbis Books	
57141	Runaway Spoon Press	Port Charlotte, Florida, UA
57224	New Harbinger Publications, Inc.	Oakland, CA
57230	Guildford Press	
57231	Microsoft Press	Redmond, Washington, US
57293	Discovery House Publishers	affiliated with RBC Ministries, Grand Rapids, Michigan
57322	Riverhead Books	a member of Penguin Putnam
57330	Epic Music Video	
57387	Information Today, Inc	Medford, New Jersey, US
57423	Black Sparrow Books – an imprint of David R. Godine, Publisher	Boston, Massachusetts, US
57455	USCCB Publishing	United States Conference of Catholic Bishops
57482	Search Institute Press	Minneapolis, Minnesota, US
57488	Potomac Books	Dulles, Virginia, US; additional imprint: Brassey's
57506	Eisenbrauns	(also 0-9667840)
57583	Twin Sisters	
57610	The Coriolis Group	A division of Penguin Group (USA)
57673	Random House	Multnomah Publishers
57675	Berrett-Koehler Publishing	San Francisco, California, US
57731	New World Library	Novato, California, US
57766	Waveland Press, Inc.	Long Grove, Illinois, US
57800	Software Sculptors	imprint of Central Park Media
57805	Sierra Club Books	San Francisco, California, US
57813	A.D. Vision, Inc.	
57856	Random House	
57859	Visible Ink Press	Canton, Michigan, US
57863	Weiser Books	US
57912	Black Dog & Leventhal Publishers	New York, US
57918	Queenship Publishing Company	
57954	Rodale	
57965	Artisan	New York, US
57989	Sirius Entertainment	US
57990	Lark Books	a division of Sterling Publishing Co., Inc.
57992	Garratt Publishing	
57999	GIA Publications	
58005	Seal Press	
58008	Ten Speed Press	Berkeley, California, US
58011	Creative Homeowner	Upper Saddle River, New Jersey, US
58023	Jewish Lights Publishing	
58042	Cardoza Publishing	Paradise, Nevada
58062	Adams Media Corporation / Simon & Schuster	Avon, Massachusetts, US
58083	Stampley	
58115	Allworth Press	
58134	Crossway Books	A Division of Good News Publishers; Wheaton, Illinois
58189	Vivendi Universal (Vivendi Games)	
58194	Gleim Publications, Inc	Gainesville, Florida, US
58197	XAMonline	Melrose, Massachusetts, US
58234	Bloomsbury Publishing	New York and London
58246	Tricycle Press	Berkeley, California, US / Toronto, Ontario, Canada (imprint of Ten Speed Press 1-58761)
58322	Seven Stories Press	
58330	Feldheim Publishers	Jerusalem
58354	Bandai Entertainment	
58367	Monthly Review Press	New York, US
58388	Iconografix	Hudson WI, US
58391	Psychology Press	
58428	Amherst Media, U.S.	Amherst, US
58450	Charles River Media	Hingham, Massachusetts, US
58459	World Library	
58456	Oak Knoll Press	New Castle, Delaware, US
58465	University Press of New England	Hanover/Lebanon, New Hampshire
58488	Chapman and Hall/CRC	
58542	Jeremy P. Tarcher	A division of Penguin; New York
58595	Twenty-Third Publications	a division of Bayard
58617	Ignatius Press	
58640	Holman Bible Publishers	
58648	PublicAffairs	New York, US
58655	Media Blasters (AnimeWorks, Kitty Video, Tokyo Shock)	
58663	Spark Publishing	New York, US
58664	Central Park Media	
58713	Cisco Press	Indianapolis, Indiana, US
58726	Borders Classics	An imprint of Borders
58761	Ten Speed Press	Berkeley, California, US
58817	Trimark Home Video	
58829	Humana Press	Springer imprint
58838	NewSouth Books	Montgomery, Alabama, US
58939	Virtualbookworm Publishing	
58948	Ersi Press	Redlands, California, US
58971	DEJ Productions	
58976	The Narrative Press	Santa Barbara, CA, USA
58980	Pelican Publishing	Gretna, LA, USA
58997	Tyndale	
59028	William, James & Co	Imprint of Franklin, Beedle & Associates; Sherwood, Oregon, US
59038	Deseret Book	Salt Lake City, Utah, US; also 0-87579 and 1-57008
59052	Waterbrook Multnomah	
59059	Apress	New York 10013, US
59078	Boyd's Mills Press	
59116	VIZ Media	San Francisco, USA
59145	Integrity Publishers, part of Thomas Nelson Publishers	
59182	TOKYOPOP Inc.	
59185	Charisma House	
59223	Thunder Bay Press	San Diego, California, US
59240	Gotham Books	spaced as 1-592-40...
59241	First Look Studios, Inc.	
59253	Rockport Publishing	
59257	Alpha, part of Penguin Group	
59276	Our Sunday Visitor	
59308	Barnes & Noble Classics	New York, US
59317	Warner Press	
59325	Word Among Us Press	
59327	No Starch Press	San Francisco, California 94103, US
59333	Gorgias Press	Piscataway, New Jersey 08855-6939, US
59376	Soft Skull	
59385	The Guilford Press	New York, US
59393	Bearmanor Media	Albany, GA; also 1-62933
59409	Bandai Entertainment Inc.	
59417	Scepter Publishers	
59435	Lions Gate Films	
59444	Genius Products LLC.	
59445	Genius Products LLC.	
59451	Paradigm Publications (trade name of Birkenkamp & Co.)	Boulder, Colorado, US
59460	Carolina Academic Press	Durham, North Carolina, US
59471	Ave Maria Press	
59496	Teora US	Capitol Heights, Maryland US
59569	Mondial	New York, US
59580	Santa Monica Press	Santa Monica, California, US
59582	Dark Horse Manga	
59594	WingSpan Publishing	Livermore, California, US
59596	Changeling Press, LLC	
59614	Marians of the Immaculate Conception	
59637	Silverback Books	
59643	Roaring Brook Press	New York
59726	Island Press	Washington, D.C., US
59756	Plural Publishers	San Diego, California
59780	Night Shade Books	San Francisco, California, US
59788	Xenon Pictures, Inc.	Santa Monica, California 90401
59812	Nintendo of America Incorporated	Redmond, Washington, US
59874	Left Coast Press	Walnut Creek, California, US
59883	Media Blasters	
59922	Twin Sisters	
59941	Foundation Press	
59982	Saint Mary's Press	
60126	Masthof Press	Morgantown, Pennsylvania, US
60135	United States Conference of Catholic Bishops	
60142	Multnomah Books	
60239	Skyhorse Publishing, Inc	New York, US
60342	Storey Publishing	North Adams, Massachusetts, US
60399	Sidetrack Films	division of Vivendi Visual Entertainment
60406	Thieme Medical Publishers	
60426	CQ Press	Washington, D.C., US
60478	Zagat Survey	New York, US
60486	PM Press	Oakland, California, US
60496	Bandai Entertainment Inc.	
60547	Lippincott Williams & Wilkins	
60552	Lulu	
60566	Information Science Reference	Hershey, Pennsylvania, US
60606	J. Paul Getty Museum and Getty Research Institute	Los Angeles, California, US; also 0-89236
60623	Guilford Press	New York, US
60649	Business Expert Press	New York, US
60660	Calla Editions	Mineola, New York, US; an imprint of Dover Publications
60670	Dolores Press	San Francisco, California, US
60831	Wolters Kluwer Health (US)	Philadelphia, Pennsylvania, US
60876	Nova Science Publishers	New York
60918	Guilford Press	New York, US
61053	Blackbird Books	New York, US; Los Angeles, California, US
61121	Savas Beatie	El Dorado Hills, CA, USA
61197	Society for Industrial and Applied Mathematics	Philadelphia, Pennsylvania, US
61200	Casemate Publishers	Philadelphia & Oxford
61262	Kodansha USA	
61324	Nova Science Publishers	New York, US
61530	Britannica Educational Publishing	New York, US
61615	Sentai Filmworks	
61634	Simply Charlotte Mason	Grayson, Georgia, US
61636	Franciscan Media	Cincinnati, Ohio, US
61638	FrontLine	Lake Mary, Florida, US
61677	Faber Piano Adventures	
61988	Archie Comic Publications, Inc.	Pelham, New York, USA
62079	Cherry Hill Publishing	Ramona, California, US
62224	Warner Home Video, Incorporated	
62249	The Educational Publisher Inc./Zip Publishing/Biblio Publishing	Columbus, Ohio, US
62404	Warner Home Video, Incorporated	
62692	Seven Seas Entertainment, LLC	Los Angeles, California, USA
62698	Orbis Books	Maryknoll, New York, US
62700	Kalmbach Media (formerly Kalmbach Publishing Company, until 2018)	Waukesha, Wisconsin, US
62738	Archie Comic Publications, Inc.	Pelham, New York, USA
62972	Deseret Book	Salt Lake City, Utah, US; also 1-57008 and 1-59038
62933	Bearmanor Media	Albany, GA;also 1-59393
62997	The Great Courses	Chantilly, Virginia, US
63065	Pukiyari Editores/Publishers	Gahanna, Ohio, US
63236	Kodansha USA Publishing, LLC	
63248	A.D. Vision Inc.	
63591	Pulp-Lit Inc.	Corvallis, Oregon, USA
63858	Seven Seas Entertainment	Los Angeles, California, USA
64275	Seven Seas Entertainment, LLC	Los Angeles, California, USA
64505	Seven Seas Entertainment	Los Angeles, California, USA
64729	Vertical	New York City, USA
64827	Seven Seas Entertainment	Los Angeles, California, USA
64828~64999	?	
65000~67999	see #4-digit publisher codes	
68000~68154	?	
68155	Cloanto	
68255	Archie Comic Publications, Inc.	Pelham, New York, USA
68470, 68471, 68474	Lulu	
68579	Seven Seas Entertainment	Los Angeles, California, USA
68580~68599	?	
68600~71399	see #4-digit publisher codes	
71400~71699	see #3-digit publisher codes	
71700~73199	see #4-digit publisher codes	
73200~73999	see #7-digit publisher codes	
74000~74109	?	
74110	New Holland Publishers	London, UK
74175	Allen & Unwin	Crows Nest, NSW, Australia
74179	Lonely Planet Publications pty	Melbourne, Vic, Australia
74220	Lonely Planet Publications pty	Melbourne, Vic, Australia
74237	Allen & Unwin	Crows Nest, Australia
74257	New Holland Publishers	London, UK
74305	Wakefield Press	Adelaide, Australia
74306~76199	?	
76200~76349	see #4-digit publisher codes	
76350~76499	see #7-digit publisher codes	
76500~77044	?	
77045	General Books, LLC	Memphis, Tennessee, US; Also: 1-150 to 1-154, 1-4432, 1-4589, 1-4590
77007	Struik	
77008~77499	?	
77500~77539	see #7-digit publisher codes	
77540~77639	?	
77640~77649	see #7-digit publisher codes	
77650~77699	?	
77700~77829	see #7-digit publisher codes	
77830~78001	?	
78002	The Criterion Collection/Janus Films	
78007	Open University	Milton Keynes, UK
78022	Orion Books	London, UK
78026	New Internationalist Publications	Oxford, UK
78032	Zed Books	London, UK
78068	Intersentia Publishing	Cambridge, England
78125	Profile Books Ltd	London, England
78131	Aurum Press	London, UK
78145	Ammonite Press	Lewes, UK
78168	Verso Books	London, UK
78201	Evertype	Dundee, Scotland (Portlaoise, Ireland until 2018-02; Westport, Ireland until 2014-03; previous series 1-904808 completed 2012)
78243	Michael O'Mara Books	London, UK
78249	Ryland Peters & Small	London, England; New York, US
78329	Titan Books	London, England
78341	Priddy Books	London, UK
78361	Flame Tree Publishing	London, UK
78389	Future plc	Bournemouth, UK
78404	Arcturus Publishing	London, UK
78416	Transworld Publishers	London, UK
78470	Vintage Books (imprint of Random House)	London, UK
78472	Octopus Books	London, UK
78578	Icon Books	London, UK
78579	Carousel Calendars	Exeter, UK
78713	Quadrille Publishing	London, UK
78719	Legend Press	London, UK
78758	Flame Tree Publishing	London, UK
78800	Nosy Crow	London, UK
78881	The Criterion Collection/Janus Films	
78954	Head of Zeus Ltd	Imprints Apollo, Anima, HoZ Fiction, Aria, Aries, Zephyr
78955~78999	?	
79000~79999	see #4-digit publisher codes	
80000~83799	?	
83800~83849	see #7-digit publisher codes	
83850~83999	?	
84000	Mitchell Beazley	London, UK
84002	Oberon Books, Ltd	London, UK
84011	Templar Publishing	Dorking, UK
84013	Grange Books	Hoo, Kent, UK
84014	Scolar Press	Mereston, Yorkshire
84022	Wordsworth Editions	Ware, England
84023	Titan Books	London, England
84024	Summersdale Publishers	Chichester, UK
84028	Marshall Publishing	London, UK
84033	Stenlake Publishing	Catrine, UK
84037	Air Life Publishing	Shrewsbury, UK
84046	Icon Books	Cambridge, England
84049	Local Government Association	London, UK
84067	Caxton Editions	London, UK; also 0-86176
84068	Creation Books	
84081	Sebastian Kelly	Oxford, UK
84084	Dempsey Parr	Bristol, UK
84091	Conran Octopus	London, UK
84092	Apple Press	London, UK
84100	Quadrillion Publishing	Surrey, England
84104	The Memoir Club	Spennymoor, England
84113	Hart Publishing	Oxford, UK
84114	Halsgrove	Tiverton, Devon, UK
84115	Harper Perennial	London, UK
84116	Economic & Financial Publishing	Henley-on-Thames, England
84119	Constable & Robinson	London, UK
84126	Meyer & Meyer	Maidenhead, England
84139	Compass Maps	Bath, UK
84149	Orbit Books	Victoria Embankment, London
84150	Intellect	Bristol, England
84151	Alan Godfrey Maps	Also 0-85054; also 0-907554; also 1-84784
84157	Thomas Cook Publishing	Peterborough, UK
84158	Birlinn	Edinburgh, Scotland; also 1-84341
84164	Parragon	Bath, UK
84169	Psychology Press	Hove, England; New York, US (Taylor & Francis imprint)
84172	Ryland Peters & Small	London, England; New York, US
84176	Osprey Publishing	Oxford, UK; also 1-84603 and 0-85045
84177	Higher Education Statistics Agency (HESA)	Cheltenham, England
84179	Paragon Publishing	Trowbridge, UK
84185	Department for Education and Employment	London, UK
84195	Canongate Books	Edinburgh, UK
84217	Oxbow Books	Oxford, England
84219	Royal Institution of Chartered Surveyors (RICS)	Coventry, UK
84222	Carlton Publishing Group	London, UK
84239	Alligator Books	London, UK
84275	Politico's Publishing	London, England
84277	Zed Books	London, England and New York
84311	Informa Telecoms & Media	London, England
84317	Michael O'Mara Books	London, UK
84318	GTI Specialist Publishers	Preston Crowmarsh, UK
84330	New Holland Publishers	London, UK
84334	Chandos Publishing	Albington, England (part of Woodhead Pub.)
84340	Anova Books	UK
84341	Birlinn	Edinburgh, Scotland; also 1-84158
84348	Geographers' A–Z Map Company	Borough Green, UK
84353	Rough Guides	London, England
84354	Atlantic Books	London, England – alloc. complete Jan 2010
84359	National Trust	Swindon, UK
84368	Pallas Athene	London, UK
84373	The Work Foundation	UK
84383	Boydell & Brewer also Boydell Press	Woodbridge
84388	Department for Work and Pensions	London, UK
84398	Chartered Institute of Personnel and Development	Wimbledon, UK
84400	Quadrille Publishing	London, England
84401	Athena Press	London, England
84407	Earthscan	London, England
84408	Virago Press	London, England
84413	Century, The Random House Group	
84415	Pen & Sword; Leo Cooper	Barnsley, South Yorkshire, UK
84425	Haynes Publishing Group	Sparkford, UK
84437	Arris Publishing	Moreton-in-Marsh, England
84445	Learning Matters Ltd	Exeter, England
84449	Omnibus Press	a division of Book Sales Limited
84451	Flame Tree Publishing	London, UK
84454	John Blake Publishing	London, England
84465	Acumen Publishing	Durham, UK
84467	Verso Books	London, UK
84468	Pen & Sword Books	Barnsley, England
84476	Southwater	London, England; imprint of Anness Publishing
84477	Hermes House	London, England; imprint of Anness Publishing
84490	Which?	London, UK
84502	Black & White Publishing	Edinburgh, UK
84511	I.B. Tauris	London, England
84513	Aurum Press	London, UK
84519	Sussex Academic Press	Eastbourne, England
84520	Berg	Oxford, UK
84525	Think Books	London, UK
84528	How To Books	Begbroke, Oxford, England
84529	Constable & Robinson	London, England
84533	Octopus Publishing Group	London, England
84537	New Holland Publishers	London, UK
84541	Channel View Publications	Bristol, England
84545	Berghahn Books	New York, US
84549	Abramis Academic Publishing	Bury St. Edmunds, England
84564	WIT Press	Ashurst, England
84569	Woodhead Publishing Ltd.	Abington, Cambridge, England
84576	Titan Books	London, England
84584	Veloce Publishing	Dorchester, England
84588	nonsuch Publishing	Stroud
84589	The Francis Frith Collection	Teffont, UK
84590	Crown House Publishing	Bancyfelin, Wales; & Bethel, Connecticut, US
84593	CABI	Wallingford, England
84603	Osprey Publishing	Botley, Oxford, England; also 1-84176 and 0-85045
84605	Random House	also 0-09
84607	BBC Books	London, UK
84608	Transport Research Laboratory	Wokingham, UK
84614	Penguin Books	London, UK
84624	Book Guild Publishers	Brighton, England
84631	Liverpool University Press	Liverpool, England
84640	J. Salmon	Sevenoaks, UK
84661	Jordan Publishing Ltd	Bristol, UK. Imprints: Family Law
84668	Profile Books Ltd	London, England
84674	Countryside Publications	Newbury, Berkshire, UK
84694	Zero Books	Winchester, England
84695	Department for Work and Pensions	London, UK
84703	Thomson Reuters (Legal) Ltd	London, UK
84706	Baylor University Press	Waco, Texas, US
84708	Granta Publications	London, UK
84710	Kaplan Publishing UK	Wokingham, UK
84716	Straightforward Publishing	Lewes, UK
84719	Packt	Birmingham, England
84728	Lulu	London, England
84732	Carlton Books	London, England
84739	Simon and Schuster (UK)	London, England
84742	The Policy Press	Bristol, England
84747	Chipmunkapublishing	Brentwood, England
84755	Royal Society of Chemistry	Cambridge, England
84756	Avon (UK)	London, UK
84763	Department for Work and Pensions	London, UK
84766	Bloomsbury Professional	Haywards Heath, England (formerly Tottel Pub.)
84767	Canongate Books	Edinburgh, UK
84771	University of Wales Press	Also 0-7083
84773	New Holland Publishers	London, UK
84784	Alan Godfrey Maps	Also 0-85054; also 0-907554; also 1-84151
84786	Flame Tree Publishing	London, UK
84787	SAGE Publications	Los Angeles, California, US
84797	The Crowood Press	Ramsbury, Marlborough, England
84798	Wolters Kluwer (UK) Ltd	Kingston upon Thames, England
84802	English Heritage	Swindon, England
84817	Igloo Books	Sywell, England
84831	Icon Books	UK
84844	Edward Elgar Publishing	Cheltenham, UK; and Northampton, Massachusetts
84845	MIRA, Harlequin	
84856	Titan Books	London, England
84866	Quercus	London, England
84868	Amberley Publishing	Stroud, England.
84872	Psychology Press	Hove, England and New York, US
84876	Troubador Publishing	Leicester, England
84877	Templar Publishing	Dorking, UK
84884	Pen & Sword Books	Barnsley, England
84887	Atlantic Books	London, England
84905	Jessica Kingsley Publishers	London, England
84916	Quercus	London, UK
84949	Quadrille Publishing	London, England
84950	Emerald Books	Bingley, England
84951	Packt Publishing	Birmingham, England
84954	Biteback Publishing	London, England
84975	Ryland Peters & Small	London, England; New York, US
84983	Simon and Schuster (UK)	London, England
85015	Exley Publications	Watford, UK, and New York, US
85018	Inner Circle Books	London, UK
85022	Truran Books	Mount Hawke, UK
85044	Lloyd's of London Press	Paisley, Scotland
85051	Treasure Press	London, UK
85052	Peerage Books	London, UK
85055	FHG Guides Ltd	Paisley, Scotland
85058	Sigma Press	Wilmslow, UK
85074	English Heritage	UK
85109	ABC-CLIO	
85112	Office of the Deputy Prime Minister	London, UK
85124	Bodleian Library, University of Oxford	Oxford, UK
85152	Reed International Books	London, UK
85158	Mainstream Publishing	Edinburgh, Scotland
85168	Oneworld Publications	Oxford, England
85182	Four Courts Press	Dublin
85224	Bloodaxe Books	
85227	Virgin Books	
85233	Springer	London, UK
85242	Serpent's Tail	
85249	Campaign for Real Ale	St Albans, UK
85250	Acorn Computers Limited	Cambridge, England
85260	Patrick Stephens/Haynes Publishing Group	Sparkford, England
85273	Dance Books Ltd.	
85283	Boxtree	London, UK
85284	Cicerone Press	Milnthorpe, Cumbria, UK
85286	Titan Books	London, UK
85302	Jessica Kingsley Publishers	London, UK
85304	Ravette	
85306	Countryside Books	Newbury, Berkshire, UK
85310	Swan Hill Press	Shrewsbury, UK
85315	Royal Society of Medicine Press	London, England
85326	Wordsworth Editions	Ware, Hertfordshire, UK
85328	The Law Society	London, UK
85331	Ryburn Publishing	Krumlin, Halifax, UK
85343	Free Association Books	London, UK
85367	Greenhill Books	London, UK
85375	Prion	London, UK
85386	Fleetway Editions Ltd	London, UK
85391	Merehurst Press	London, UK
85409	Arms & Armour Press	Imprint of Cassell Group
85410	Aurum Press	London, UK
85411	Seren Books	Bridgend, UK
85414	Capital History, Capital Transport Publishing	Harrow, London, UK
85430	The Society for Theatre Research	London, UK
85437	Tate Gallery	London, UK
85450	ELM Publications	Kings Ripton, England
85452	Croner Publications	Kingston upon Thames, UK
85458	Vacation Work	Oxford, UK
85459	Nick Hern Books	London, England
85471	Bloomsbury Books (Godfrey Cave Group)	London, UK
85479	Michael O'Mara Books	London, UK
85487	Robinson	London, England
85567	Pinter	London, UK
85568	Dalesman Books	Clapham, North Yorkshire, UK
85597	Henderson Publishing	Woodbridge, UK
85604	Facet	London, UK
85613	Merehurst Press	London, UK
85619	Sinclair-Stevenson Ltd.	
85626	Kyle Cathie	London, England
85629	Eaglemoss Publications	London, UK
85648	The Promotional Reprint Company	UK
85669	Laurence King Publishing Ltd	London, England
85671	Michelin Tyre plc	Harrow, UK
85675	Gaia Books	
85688	Springfield Books	Denby Dale, UK
85702	Fourth Estate Limited	Oxford, England
85703	How to Books Ltd	Oxford, England
85716	English Nature	UK
85723	Orbit Books	London, UK
85733	Kuperard	(Imprint of Bravo Ltd.) London, UK
85739	Reed Business Information	East Grinstead, England
85743	Europa Pub.	London, England – now part of Routledge
85758	Letts Educational	London, UK
85769	The Dementia Services Development Centre	Stirling, Scotland
85774	Office for National Statistics	Newport, Wales, UK
85783	Waterlow Professional Pub.	London, England
85788	Nicholas Brealey Publishing	London, UK and Boston, Massachusetts, US
85789	Atlantic Books	London, England
85793	Pavilion Books	
85799	Phoenix	Division of Orion Books
85805	Letts Educational	London, UK
85825	Smith Settle	Otley, UK
85833	Bramley Books	UK
85856	Trentham Books	Stoke-on-Trent, Trentham, UK
85868	Carlton Books	London, UK
85870	Future	Bath, UK
85899	Bournemouth University	Poole, England
85926	Aurora Publishing	UK
85928	Scolar Press	Mereston, Yorkshire
85935	Joseph Rowntree Foundation	York, England
85936	Carnegie Press/Carnegie Publishing	Preston/Lancaster, UK
85937	The Francis Frith Collection	Teffont, UK
85941	Routledge	(also 0-415)
85946	Royal Institute of British Architects	London, UK
85958	Senate	London, UK
85960	Haynes Publishing	
85973	Berg	Oxford, UK; New York, US
85982	Streetmaster	Fordham, Essex, UK
85983	Breedon Books	Derby, UK
85984	Verso Books	London, UK
85995	Parkstone	London, UK; New York, US
86019	Arms & Armour Press / Brockhampton Press	Imprint of Cassell
86019	Caxton Editions	London, England
86030	Institute for Public Policy Research	London, UK
86046	Harvill Press	London, UK
86064	I.B. Tauris / Radcliffe Press	London, UK
86072	ICSA Information & Training	London, England
86077	Phillimore & Co	Chichester, England, UK
86080	Cityscape Maps Ltd	Welton, Lincoln, England, UK
86082	Ignatius Press	
86094	Imperial College Press	London, England, UK
86100	Wrox Press	Birmingham, England
86105	Chrysalis	London, England, UK
86123	Trail Publishing	
86124	CIPS	The Chartered Institute of Procurement & Supply
86134	The Policy Press	Bristol, England (series completed, now on 84742)
86147	Abbeydale Press	Wigston, UK
86176	Chatham Publishing/Gerald Duckworth	London, England
86178	Venture Press	pubs. for British Association of Social Workers; Birmingham, UK
86187	Exley Publications	Watford, UK and New York, US
86189	Reaktion Books	London, UK
86197	Profile Books	London, UK
86207	Granta	London, UK
86220	Centre for North-West Regional Studies, University of Lancaster	Lancaster, UK
86230	Anchor Books	London, UK
86232	Tuckwell	East Linton, UK
86239	The Geological Society	Bath, England, UK
86252	Hopevale Mission Board	Milton, Queensland, Australia
86254	Wakefield Press	Adelaide, Australia
86335	Common Ground Publishing	Champaign, Illinois, US
86396	ACP Publishing	Sydney, Australia
87685	Black Sparrow Books - An imprint of David R. Godine, Publisher	Boston, Massachusetts, US
86397~86719	?	
86720~86759	see #4-digit publisher codes	
86760~86979	?	
86980~91599	see #6-digit publisher codes	
91600~916505	see #7-digit publisher codes	
916506~91686	see #6-digit publisher codes	
91687~916907	see #7-digit publisher codes	
916908~919163	see #6-digit publisher codes	
919164~919564	see #7-digit publisher codes	
919565~91959	see #6-digit publisher codes	
91960~919654	see #7-digit publisher codes	
919655~97299	see #6-digit publisher codes	
97300~98779	see #4-digit publisher codes	
98780~99114	see #6-digit publisher codes	
99115~99119	see #7-digit publisher codes	
99120~99898	see #6-digit publisher codes	
99899~99999	see #7-digit publisher codes	

== 6-digit publisher codes ==
Publisher code	Publisher	Notes
800000~837999	see #5-digit publisher codes	
838000~838499	see #7-digit publisher codes	
838500~867199	see #5-digit publisher codes	
867200~867599	see #4-digit publisher codes	
867600~869799	see #5-digit publisher codes	
869800~869856	?	
869857	Wordwell	Bray, Co. Wicklow, Ireland
870018	Industrial Common Ownership Movement (ICOM) (now merged with Co-operatives UK)	Leeds, England, UK
870119	Foxline Publishing	Bredbury, UK
870149	Chameleon International	Spalding, England
870257	UK eInformation Group UKeiG	London?, England
870325	Whittles	Dunbeath, Scotland
870545	Canterbury Archaeological Trust	Canterbury, England
870614	Libertarian Alliance	London, UK
870652	Cairns Publications	Sheffield, England, UK
870699	Book Works	London, UK
870754	Runpast Publishing	Cheltenham, UK
870780	British Ballet Organisation	London, UK
870870	John Brown Publishing Ltd.	London, UK
870948	Quiller Press	London, England
871044	Pondview Books	Peterborough, England
871149	Footprint Maps	Stirling, Scotland
871236	Lancashire County Books	Preston, UK
871647	Wharncliffe Books	Barnsley, UK
871814	Roadmaster Publishing	Chatham, England
871891	Ethics International Press	Bury St. Edmunds, England
872167	Hutton Press	Beverley, England
872226	Printwise Publications	UK
872229	Patten Press	UK
872239	Printability Publishing	Hartlepool, England
872346	Northern Heritage Consultancy Ltd.	Newcastle upon Tyne, UK
872405	Hallewell Publications	Pitlochry, UK
872489	SAWD Publications	Bicknor, UK
872524	Platform 5 Publishing	Sheffield, England
872650	Manchester City Council	Manchester, England
872843	Saffron Books	London, England
872895	Landy Publishing	Staining, Lancashire, UK
873079	Paper Publications	UK
873124	Cumberland and Westmorland Antiquarian and Archaeological Society	Kendal?, England
873394	Donhead Publishing	Donhead St. Mary, Shaftesbury, England
873592	English Heritage	Swindon, UK
873626	Breedon Books	Derby, UK
873667	Comedia	Stroud, UK
873668	TTL	Harrogate, UK
873888	Owl Books	Wigan, UK
873892	Pegasus Publishing	
873951	Tabb House	Padstow
873976	Christie Books	Hastings, England
874165	Work Research Centre	Dublin, Ireland
874181	Palatine Books	Lancaster, UK
874185	BBA Enterprises	London, UK
874350	Wessex Archaeology	Salisbury, England
874584	The Myrtlefield Trust/Myrtlefield House	Coleraine, N Ireland
875202	Weldon Russel Publishing	Willoughby
875998	Central Queensland University Press	also 1-876780
876627	Wrightbooks	Elsternwick, Vic, Australia
876756	Spinifex Press	North Melbourne, Vic, Australia
876780	Central Queensland University Press	Rockhampton, Australia; also 1-875998
878109	ASP Press	
878663	Professional Association of Diving Instructors	
878685	Turner Publishing	A subsidiary of Turner Broadcasting Systems - Atlanta, GA, USA
878718	Catholic Book Publishing	Resurrection Press
878798	Press Here	Sammamish, Washington
879016	Union of Orthodox Jewish Congregations of America	
879402	Tahrike Tarsile Qur'an	Elmhurst, New York
879505	Silman-James Press	Beverly Hills, California, US
879630	Wind Canyon Publishing	Niceville, Florida, US
879664	Stan Clark Military Books	Gettysburg, PA, US
879751	Camden House	Columbia, South Carolina, US
880094	Association for the Advancement of Computing in Education	Chesapeake, Virginia
880229	Scuba Schools International GmbH	
880317	Biblical Archaeology Society	Washington, D.C.
880654	Pogo Press	Saint Paul, Minnesota, US
880685	Two Plus Two Publishing	Henderson, Nevada
880837	Smith & Helwys Publishing	Macon, Georgia
880985	2.13.61	
881307	Saint Anthony Messenger Press	
881943	Daedalus Publishing	
882002	Alexander Graham Bell Association for the Deaf and Hard of Hearing	
883362	Indiana Academy of Science	
883869	Golden Gate National Parks Conservancy	San Francisco, California
884409	Capitol Records	
884479	MercySong	
884718	Oak Knoll Press & The British Library	New Castle, Delaware, US
884760	Wells Street Publishing	
884822	Black Dog & Levanthal Publishing	
884910	F+W Publications	Cincinnati, Ohio, US
885705	Prometheus Nemesis Book Company	Del Mar, California, US
885845	The Leaflet Missal Company	
886070	ConJelCo LLC	Pittsburgh, Pennsylvania
886376	Network Cybernetics Corporation (NCC)	Dallas, Texas, US
886910	Front Street	Arden, NC, USA
887123	Granary Books	likely New York, US
887829	Journal of Roman Archaeology llc	Portsmouth, Rhode Island, US
888521	Brunswick Press	Cathedral City, California, US
888799	Demos Vermande	New York, US
889140	Parentmagic, Inc.	Glen Ellyn, Illinois, US
889332	Southern Heritage Press	Murfreesboro, TN, USA
889758	Evolution Publishing	Merchantville, New Jersey, US
890000	Danaan Press	Richardson, Texas, US
890159	Greenery Press	Emeryville, California, US; also 0-890159
890603	Urban Vision Entertainment	
890871	Holcomb Hathaway Publishers	Scottsdale, Arizona, US
891105	Lake Isle Press, Inc.	
891620	Perseus Books Group; Public Affairs	Cambridge, Massachusetts, US
891792	Harvard Education Press	Cambridge, Massachusetts, US
892058	DreamHaven Books	Minneapolis, Minnesota US
892723	Black Books	
892959	Anonymous Press	Malo, Washington, US
893018	Superscape	
893020	Mandeville Press	Los Angeles, California, US
893447	MAAT Press	South San Francisco, California, US
893707	Rural Heritage Video	Cedar Rapids, Iowa, US
893410	Picture This! Home Video	Los Angeles, California, US
893732	Sorin Books	
893757	E.T. Nedder Publishing	
893831	Food for Thought Publishing, Foodnsport Press	609 N. Jade Drive Key Largo, Florida 33037, US
893955	University of South Alabama Center for Archaeological Studies	Mobile, Alabama, US
895565	Firefly Books	Willowdale, California, US
896239	J. Gordon Shillingford Publishing Inc.	
896332	The River Press	Toronto, Ontario, Canada
896357	Rutgers University Press	Piscataway, New Jersey, US
897177	Autodesk	San Rafael, California, US
897350	Collector's Guide Publishing	Burlington, Ontario, Canada
897744	Oksforder Yidish Press	Oxford, UK
897878	TRP Magazines Ltd (Redmayne Publishing Company)	
897940	Ta-Ha	London, UK
898051	Ringpull Press	
898059	PCCS Books	Ross-on-Wye, UK
898062	Hedgehog Historical Publications	UK
898319	Quail Map Company	
898432	Venture Publications	Glossop, UK
898435	J. Salmon	Sevenoaks, UK
898880	Bewick Press	Whitley Bay, England
899082	Everson Gunn Teoranta	Dublin, Ireland
899181	Book Clearance Centre	UK
889246	Schroeder Publications	Lynchburg, VA, USA
899280	National Autistic Society	London, UK
899366	J.G.Harston	Sheffield, UK
899468	Soccerdata, an imprint of Tony Brown	Nottingham, England
899571	Pulp Faction	London, UK
899694	Brick Tower Press	New York
899889	Lightmoor Press	Lydney, UK
900106	Purr Books	London, England
900147	Cornish Hillside	St Austell
900178	Redcliffe Press	Bristol, England. Also 904537 and 906593.
900193	Milepost 92 1/2	
900322	Green Earth Books	Dartington, UK
900357	Giles de la Mare	London, England
900463	True North Publishing	Halifax, UK
900510	TRADA Technology	Hughenden Valley, UK
900640	CRD – Centre for Reviews and Dissemination	York, England
900901	CLÀR	Inverness, Scotland
900915	Cathedral Communications	Tisbury, Wilts, England
900924	Helter Skelter Publishing	London, England
900929	Blot Publishing	Sussex, England
901019	IM Publications	
901092	Andreas Papadakis	London
901132	F R Turner	Gravesend, England
901184	The Ramblers' Association	UK
901409	Agan Tavas	Redruth, England
901447	Cherry Red Books	
901556	Industrial Railway Society	London, England
901658	Ashfield Press	Dublin, Éire
901703	Maritime Information Association	London, England
901821	Lippincott Williams & Wilkins	
901927	Route	Glasshoughton, UK
902356	Gingerfold Publications	Swaffham Prior, Cambridgeshire, UK
902435	Staff and Educational Development Association (SEDA)	London, England
902459	University of Birmingham Press	
902538	Argentum (an Aurum Press imprint)	London, England
902633	York Publishing Services	York, UK
902686	Scriptum Editions	London, England
902771	Council for British Archaeology	York, England
902786	Campaign to Protect Rural England	London, UK
902827	Atlantic Publishers	Penryn, UK
902937	McDonald Institute for Archaeological Research	Cambridge, England
903007	Brontë Society	Haworth, UK
903009	Generation Publications	London, UK
903035	Wessex Books	Newton Toney, England
903018	Prospect Books	Totnes, England
903089	Compelling Books	London, UK
903111	Reynolds & Hearn	
903115	William Reed Publishing	Crawley, UK
903158	Parrs Wood Press	Manchester, UK
903204	True North Publishing	Halifax, UK
903208	Chartered Institute of Housing in Scotland	Edinburgh, UK
903221	Jacqui Small (an Aurum Press imprint)	London, England
903222	Nightingale	London, UK
903258	Carroll & Brown Publishers	London, UK
903266	Irwell Press	Clophill, Bedfordshire, UK
903274	Institute for Fiscal Studies	London, UK
903307	LAG Education and Service Trust Ltd	London, England
903425	Wharncliffe Books	Barnsley, UK
903427	Francis Boutle	London
903511	Piggyback Interactive	
903599	Black Dwarf Publications	Witney, England
903753	Itchy Ltd	Leeds, UK
903798	Cornwall Council	Cornwall, England
903855	Russell House Publishing	Lyme Regis, England
903973	Royal Academy of Arts	London, England
904041	Flame Tree Publishing	London, UK
904193	WLR Media & Entertainment	London, England
904111	Federation for Community Development Learning	Sheffield, England
904265	Rebellion Developments (2000AD, Abaddon Books, Solaris Books)	Oxford, England
904339	Risk Books	London, England (an imprint of Incisive Media)
904341	Haus Publications	London, England
904349	The Dovecote Press	Wimborne, England
904380	Waterside Press	Hook, England
904400	Chartered Society of Physiotherapy	London, England
904437	AHDB Market Intelligence	Kenilworth, England
904537	Redcliffe Press	Bristol, England. Also 900178 and 906593.
904761	Nottingham University Press	Nottingham, England
904608	Taxcafe UK Ltd	Kirkcaldy, Scotland
904808	Evertype	Westport, Mayo, Ireland (series completed 2012, followed by 1-78201)
904829	BCIS – (complete cont. on 907196)	Poole, UK
904851	Rockingham Press	Ware, England
904859	AK Press	
904871	The Good Life Press	Preston, UK
904879	Marshall Cavendish/Cyan Communications	London, England
904905	Spiramus Press	London, England
904934	Institute of Islamic Studies	London, England
904943	Grul Street	London, England
904966	Historic Scotland	Edinburgh, UK
904994	Guinness World Records	UK
905080	Great Northern Books	Ilkley, England
905119	Windgather Books (Oxbow imprint)	Oxford, England
905125	The Classical Press of Wales	Swansea, Wales
905140	Hammersmith Press	London, England
905214	Chastleton Travel	Moreton-in-Marsh, England
905221	British Institute of International and Comparative Law	London, UK
905223	Heritage Marketing & Publications	Great Dunham, Norfolk, England
905224	Leatherhead Publishing	Leatherhead, Surrey, England
905250	Andrew Taylor	UK, also 0-9528574
905287	Reynolds & Hearn Ltd	Richmond, England
905366	AP information Services	London, England
905369	Leisure Studies Association	Eastbourne, England
905391	The College of Law	Guildford, England
905410	White Ladder Press	Ipplepen, UK
905437	Rebellion Developments (2000AD, Abaddon Books, Solaris Books)	Oxford, England
905476	Manchester Metropolitan University	Manchester, England
905482	Taxbriefs Financial Publishing	London, England
905487	Linden Press	Dublin, Éire
905499	LISU (Library & Information Statistics Unit)	Loughborough, England (based in Loughborough Univ.)
905504	Anforme	Stocksfield, England
905506	Family Planning Association (FPA)	London, England
905540	Coachwise	Armley, Leeds, England
905548	The Friday Project	London, UK
905553	BookPublishingWorld	
905569	Wordwell	Bray, Ireland
905583	Comma Press	Manchester, UK
905646	Heart of Albion	Market Harborough, England (plus imprints Alternative Albion & Explore)
905674	Wallflower Press	London, UK
905705	Itchy Ltd	Leeds, UK
905739	Archeopress	Oxford, England
905811	Eden Project Books	London, UK
905825	Bonnier Books	Chichester, UK
905847	Old Street Publishing	London, UK
905852	Drinking Water Inspectorate	London, UK
905881	Granta Publications	London, UK
905891	Soccerdata, an imprint of Tony Brown	Nottingham, England
905933	Heritage (Oxbow imprint)	Oxford, England
905942	National Gardens Scheme	Guildford, England
906035	Cision UK	London, England
906052	Reflect Press	Exeter, England
906076	Child Poverty Action Group	London, England
906093	Greenleaf Publishing	Sheffield, England
906097	Policy Exchange	London, England
906098	Footprint Books	Bath, UK
906136	Alastair Sawday Publishing	Long Ashton, UK
906155	Black Dog Publishing	
906167	Mortons of Horncastle	Horncastle, UK
906201	Fiscal Publications	Birmingham, England
906254	PCCS Books	Ross-on-Wye, UK
906294	Directory of Social Change	London, England
906304	The Heritage Council	Dublin, Ireland
906404	Highfield.co.uk	Doncaster, England
906419	Noodle Books	Southampton, UK
906465	Capstone	Chichester, England
906540	Maney Publishing	Leeds, England
906593	Redcliffe Press	Bristol, England. Also 900178 and 904537.
906621	The Lost Library	Glastonbury
906649	True North Publishing	Halifax, UK
906659	Harriman House	Petersfield, England
906660	Wallflower Press	London, England
906694	Quercus	London, UK
906718	Taylor Shannon International	Manchester, England
906807	Alison Hodge	Penzance
906884	Goodfellow Publishers	Woodeaton, Oxford, England
906909	Irwell Press	Clophill, England
906974	Eagle Editions Ltd (Heathfield Railway Publications)	Royston, Herts, UK
906994	Tindal Street Press	Birmingham/London, UK
907140	emp3books	Fleet, Hampshire, UK
907196	BCIS	Poole, UK
907264	Creativity, Culture and Education	Newcastle upon Tyne, England
907284	Nottingham University Press	Nottingham, England
907322	Maney Publishing	Leeds, England
907332	Ivy Press	Lewes, UK
907394	Media One Communications	Peterborough, UK
907410	Atom	London, England
907426	Kelsey Media	Cudham, UK
907444	Spiramus Press	London, England
907471	Libri Publishing	Faringdon, England
907499	Indepenpress	Brighton, England
907648	Train Crazy Publishing	Lytham St Annes, UK
907727	Bibliolis Books	London, UK
907794	LID Publishing	London, England
907892	The National Trust	Swindon, England
908117	Grub Street	London, UK
908397	Old Pond Publishing	Ipswich, UK
908452	COPY	Yorkshire, UK
908699	Old Street Publishing	London, UK
909090	Really Decent Books	Bath, UK
909242	Atlantic Publishing	Croxley Green, UK
909268	Footprint	Bath, UK
909328	Noodle Books (part of Crécy Publishing)	Southampton, UK
910233	Yarnstorm Press	UK
910240	Vertebrate Publishing	Sheffield, United Kingdom
910415	Key Publishing	Stamford, UK
910554	Kelsey Media	Cudham, UK
910907	English Heritage	Swindon, UK
911038	Lightmoor Press	Lydney, UK
911062	True North Books	Halifax, UK
911214	Jonathan Cape, imprint of Vintage Publishing	London, UK
911276	Mortons of Horncastle	Horncastle, UK
911301	Russell Square Publishing	Barnet, London, UK
912111	The Onslaught Press	Dundee, Scotland (Saint-Germain-en-Laye, France until 2020-07. Oxford, England until 2018-07. Previous series 0-9927238 completed 2015; 0-9934217 completed 2016; 0-9956225 completed 2016)
912142	Whitelocke Publications	Oxford, UK
912151	Kelsey Media	Cudham, UK
912240	Sandstone Press	Dingwall, UK
912784	Imperator Publishing	London, UK
913032	Rowan, Rook and Decard	London, UK
913033~915999	?	
916000~916505	see #7-digit publisher codes	
916506~916869	?	
916870~916907	see #7-digit publisher codes	
916908~919163	?	
919164~919564	see #7-digit publisher codes	
919565~919599	?	
919600~919654	see #7-digit publisher codes	
919655~920898	?	
920899	Sydney University Press	Sydney, NSW, Australia
921002	Ballistic Publishing	Adelaide, SA, Australia
921440	Madonna House Publications	
925470	Adversary publishing / Adversarial Press	Melbourne, VIC, Australia
928782	Book Marketing Works, LLC	Avon, Connecticut 06001, US
929039	Ambassador Books	
929068	Sholom Aleichem Family Publications	
929109	White Hat Communications	Harrisburg, Pennsylvania
929463	Oblagon, Incorporated	
930536	Best Publishing Company	
931009	Total Immersion Inc.	
931082	Library of America	
931160	Green Candy Press	
931445	Asir Media	
931541	Simon Publications	Safety Harbor, Florida, US
931644	Maximum Press	Gulf Breeze, Florida, US
931788	Aperture Foundation	New York, US
931930	Intercultural Press	Boston, Massachusetts, US (Imprint of Nicholas Brealey)
931951	ADK – Adirondack Mountain Club	Lake George, New York, US
932026	Collins Design	Scranton, Pennsylvania, US imprint of HarperCollins
932195	Tupelo Press	Dorset, Vermont, US
932234	Vertical	New York City, USA
932236	Intercollegiate Studies Institute	Wilimington, Delaware, US
932360	Soft Skull Press	distributed by Publishers Group West
932587	Green Key Books	
932595	Feral House Book	
932857	Disinformation	New York, US
932907	Michael Wiese Productions	Studio City, California, US
932921	Healthwise	Boise, Idaho, US
933019	now Publishers Inc.	Hanover, Massachusetts 02339, US (PO Box 1024)
933164	Seven Seas Entertainment	Los Angeles, California, USA
933202	West Virginia University Press	Morgantown, West Virginia, West Virginia, US
933264	Lawyers & Judges Publishing Co. Inc	Tucson, Arizona, US
933317	Leatherwood Press	Sandy, Utah, US
933346	Bluebridge	
933368	Soft Skull Press	Brooklyn, New York, US
933390	Chooseco	Waitsfield, VT, USA
933405	Time Inc.	
933464	Behavioral Tech, LLC	Seattle, WA
933495	Sorin Books	
935001	Acclaim Press	Morley, MO, USA
933503	Bull Publishing	Boulder, Colorado
933698	1500 Books	New York, California
933782	Berkshire Publishing Group LLC	Great Barrington, MA 01230
934074	Apprentice House	Baltimore, Maryland, US
934121	The Criterion Collection/Janus Films	
934287	Vertical	1185 Avenue of the Americas, 32nd Floor, New York City, New York 10036
934334	Photolucida	Portland, Oregon, US
934429	Ammo Books	Los Angeles, California, US
934442	Zeig, Tucker & Theiisen	Phoenix, Arizona, US
934625	The Nazca Plains Corporation	
934781	McSweeney's Books	San Francisco, California, US
934876	Seven Seas Entertainment	Los Angeles, California, USA
935182	Manning Publications Co.	Shelter Island, New York
935247	Silman-James Press	Beverly Hills, California, US
935439	Ig Publishing	New York City, USA
935149	Casemate Publishers	Philadelphia & Newbury
935654	Vertical	New York City, USA
935660	Medmaster	Miami, Florida
935934	Seven Seas Entertainment	Los Angeles, California, USA
936213	Unicode, Inc.	Mountain View, California, USA
936560	Weber Books	Northern Virginia suburbs of Washington, D.C.
936975	Archie Comic Publications, Inc.	Pelham, New York, USA
937009	Apex Publications	Lexington, KY, USA
937867	Seven Seas Entertainment	Los Angeles, California, USA
937913	Catholic Book Publishing	
938438	Creative Media Publishing	Whittier, California
938635	St. Xenia Skete	Wildwood, California
938821	Grey Gecko Press, LLC	Katy, Texas, US
938853	FutureCycle Press	Lexington, Kentucky
939130	Vertical	New York City, USA
940535	Boss Fight Books	Los Angeles, California
941125	I Street Press	Sacramento, CA
941220	Vertical	New York City, USA
941792	Bard Graduate Center	New York
942919	Hesperian Health Guides	Berkeley, California
942993	Vertical	New York City, USA
943066	Spangenhelm Publishing	Yukon, US
943287	George A. Hart Publishing	Lanoka Harbor, New Jersey
944326	Novel Dragon Press	Hutto, TX
945054	Vertical	New York City, USA
945526	I Street Press	Sacramento, CA
947194	Vertical	New York City, USA
947804	Seven Seas Entertainment	Los Angeles, California, USA
949309	Sierra Sunset Publishing	Citrus Heights, CA
949930	Wulf Wurks	
949980	Vertical	New York City, USA
951115	Gun Digest Media	Sausalito, CA
951864	Montessori By Mom	Louisville, KY
952337	I Street Press	Sacramento, CA
956635	Adelaide Books	New York, NY
961200	Kalmbach Media (formerly Kalmbach Publishing Company, until 2018)	Waukesha, Wisconsin, US
961201~972999	?	
973000~987799	see #4-digit publisher codes	
987800~989667	?	
989668	Little Bahalia Publishing	Milwaukee, Wisconsin, US
989669~991149	?	
991150~991199	see #7-digit publisher codes	
991200~998989	?	
998990~999999	see #7-digit publisher codes	

== 7-digit publisher codes ==
Publisher code	Publisher	Notes
0000000~0099999	see #3-digit publisher codes	
0100000~0299999	see #2-digit publisher codes	
0300000~0349999	see #3-digit publisher codes	
0350000~0399999	see #4-digit publisher codes	
0400000~0459999	see #3-digit publisher codes	
0460000~0469999	see #4-digit publisher codes	
0470000~0479999	see #3-digit publisher codes	
0480000~0499999	see #4-digit publisher codes	
0500000~0599999	see #2-digit publisher codes	
0600000~0643249	unallocated	
0643250~0699999	?	
0700000~0999999	see #4-digit publisher codes	
...
7000000~7139999	see #4-digit publisher codes	
7140000~7169999	see #3-digit publisher codes	
7170000~7319999	see #4-digit publisher codes	
7320000~7320002	?	
7320003	Texas Counseling Association	Austin, Texas, US
7326782	Enchanted Ink Publishing	
7330269	Barbara Young	Sacramento, CA, US
7363593	Retro Game Books	
7363594~7399999	?	
7400000~7619999	see #5-digit publisher codes	
7620000~7634999	see #4-digit publisher codes	
7635000~7649999	?	
7650000~7749999	see #5-digit publisher codes	
7750000~7753999	?	
7754000~7763999	see #5-digit publisher codes	
7764000~7764999	?	
7765000~7769999	see #5-digit publisher codes	
7770000~7782999	?	
7783000~7899999	see #5-digit publisher codes	
7900000~7999999	see #4-digit publisher codes	
8000000~8379999	see #5-digit publisher codes	
8380000~8384999	?	
8385000~8671999	see #5-digit publisher codes	
8672000~8675999	see #4-digit publisher codes	
8676000~8697999	see #5-digit publisher codes	
8698000~9159999	see #6-digit publisher codes	
9160000~9165059	?	
9165060~9168699	see #6-digit publisher codes	
9168700~9169079	?	
9169080~9191639	see #6-digit publisher codes	
9191640~9195649	?	
9195650~9195999	see #6-digit publisher codes	
9196000~9196549	?	
9196550~9729999	see #6-digit publisher codes	
9730000~9877999	see #4-digit publisher codes	
9878000~9911499	see #6-digit publisher codes	
9911500~9911999	?	
9912000~9989899	see #6-digit publisher codes	
9989900~9999999	?	

== See also ==
- List of group-0 ISBN publisher codes
- List of ISBN identifier groups
