= Staveley =

Staveley may refer to:

== Places ==
- Staveley, Cumbria, village in the former county of Westmorland and now in Cumbria, England
  - Staveley railway station
- Staveley-in-Cartmel, village formerly in Lancashire, now in Cumbria, England
- Staveley, Derbyshire, England
- Staveley, New Zealand, a locality in the Ashburton District
- Staveley, North Yorkshire, England

== People with the surname ==
- Staveley (surname)

== Other uses ==
- Staveley F.C., a football club based in Staveley, Derbyshire in the 1880s and 1890s
- Staveley (horse) (fl. 1802–1807), a British Thoroughbred racehorse

== See also ==
- Staveley Street Hong Kong
- Stavely, town in Alberta, Canada
