= Stapley =

Stapley is a surname. Notable people with the surname include:

- Anthony Stapley (1590–1655), one of the regicides of King Charles I of England
- Charles Stapley (1925–2011), British actor
- Delbert L. Stapley (1896–1978), member of the Quorum of the Twelve Apostles in The Church of Jesus Christ of Latter-day Saints
- Harry Stapley (1883–1937), English footballer
- Jay Stapley (born 1957), British musician
- John Stapley (1628–1701), Royalist who plotted with others to overthrow Oliver Cromwell and restore Charles II of England to the throne
- Jonathan A. Stapley, chemist, executive at a startup firm, independent historian of Mormonism
- Lewis G. Stapley (1879–1938), American automobile dealer and politician from New York
- Mildred Stapley Byne (1875–1941), American art historian
- Nathan Stapley, 21st-century American artist
- O. S. Stapley (1872–1942), politician from Arizona, US
- Richard Stapley, stage name Richard Wyler, (1923–2010), British-born American actor and writer
- Richard Stapley (politician) JP (1842–1920), British businessman, philanthropist, politician
- William Stapley (1887–1964), English footballer

== See also ==
- The Diane Stapley Show, 1976 Canadian music variety TV series on CBC Television
- Stapeley
- Staveley (disambiguation)
- Stopsley
