= Stampley =

Stampley is a surname. Notable people with the surname include:

- John Stampley, Mississippi Territory politician
- Joe Stampley (born 1943), American country music singer
- Micah Stampley (born 1971), American gospel singer-songwriter and actor
- Nathaniel Stampley, African-American actor

== See also ==
- Stapley
