= Elemental cost planning =

Elemental cost planning is a system of Cost planning and Cost control, typically for buildings, which enables the cost of a scheme to be monitored during design development.

1951 saw the publication of the Ministry of Education Building Bulletin No 4 which essentially introduced the concept of elemental cost planning to the UK construction industry. Its Author was James Nisbet. The concept has been refined and developed over more than 50 years in the UK by BCIS (the Building Cost Information Service of the Royal Institution of Chartered Surveyors)....

Elemental Cost Planning relies upon the adoption of a Standard Form of Cost Analysis for buildings which allows costs to be compared on a common format and forms the basis of the benchmarking analysis central to the concept of Elemental Cost Plans.

It should :-

- Ensure that the tender amount is close to the first estimate, or that any likely difference between the two is anticipated and is acceptable.
- Ensure that the money available for the projects is allocated consciously and economically to the various components and finishes.
- Always involves the measurement and pricing of approximate quantities at some stage of the process.
- Aim to achieve good value at the desired level of expenditure.

Elemental cost planning is often referred to as 'designing to a cost' or 'target cost planning' since a cost limit is fixed for the scheme and the architect must then prepare a design not to exceed this cost.

== See also ==
- Cost overrun
- BCIS
- BCIS submits data exchange standard for UN ratification.
