= Nottingham University Press =

- Parent company: University of Nottingham
- Founded: 1992
- Founder: Des Cole and Phil Garnsworthy
- Successor: 5m Publishing
- Country of origin: United Kingdom
- Headquarters location: Nottingham, England
- Publication types: Books
- Nonfiction topics: animal and food science
- Official website: www.nup.com

Nottingham University Press (NUP) was the academic press of the University of Nottingham, England. Founded in 1992 by Des Cole and Phil Garnsworthy, the press specialised in scientific and technical publishing, particularly in the areas of animal and food science (in line with the university's strengths).

In 2012, NUP was purchased by 5m Publishing.
