= Pacific Islands Trade and Investment Commission =

Pacific Trade Invest, formerly known as the Pacific Islands Trade and Investment Commission (PITIC), is the leading trade and investment facilitation organisation in the Pacific Islands region with a specific focus on export facilitation, investment and tourism promotion.

Pacific Trade Invest (PTI) contributes to the sustainable economic development of the Pacific Island Countries by creating opportunities for successful connections for exporters, investors and stakeholder organizations.

PTI aims is to improve the livelihood of the people whom live in the Pacific Islands. The 14 Forum Island Countries we represent are Cook Islands, Federated States of Micronesia, Fiji, Kiribati, Marshall Islands, Nauru, Niue, Palau, Papua New Guinea, Samoa, Solomon Islands, Tonga, Tuvalu, and Vanuatu.

PTI is an agency of the Suva based Pacific Islands Forum Secretariat, and have offices in Australia, New Zealand, China and Japan.
