= Building Cost Information Service =

British company

BCIS
- Founded: 1961
- Headquarters: Friars House, Coventry, England, United Kingdom
- Key people: James Fiske; Director
- Website: bcis.co.uk

The Building Cost Information Service (BCIS) provides cost and price data for the UK construction industry. Founded as part of the Royal Institution of Chartered Surveyors (RICS), it is now a standalone company.

== History ==
BCIS was set up in 1961 to provide the profession with cost information in elemental format and to promote the use of elements and of elemental cost planning. The BCIS "Standard Form of Cost Analysis" (SFCA) remained an industry staple, largely unchanged, until the late 2000s. In 2012 the "New Rules of Measurement" for cost management throughout the construction process were accompanied by a modernised version of the SFCA.

In 2022, the BCIS was spun out of RICS.

== Costing data ==
The BCIS approach is the most popular costing method employed by quantity surveyors in the UK.

BCIS manages the Price Adjustment Formulae Indices (PAFI) series, which provides price adjustment indices for building, civil engineering and highways maintenance costs, which can be used to inform inflationary adjustment clauses in contracts. BCIS material refers to the terms "NEDO", "Baxter" and "Osborne" as erroneously applied to these indices.
