= Khoo Kheng-Hor =

Malaysian writer (born 1956)

Khoo Kheng-Hor 邱庆河
- Khoo in Singapore, circa March 2007
- Born: 2. March 1956 (age 70); Penang, Federation of Malaya
- Education: MBA, University of Stirling
- Occupations: Author, speaker
- Spouse: Judy Hwang Chung Mei (Deceased)
- Website: www.khookhenghor.com

Khoo Kheng-Hor (Chinese: 邱庆河; Pe̍h-ōe-jī: Khu Khèng-hô; pinyin: Qiū Qìnghé; born 2 March 1956) is a Malaysian author and speaker on contemporary application of the 500 BC Chinese military treatise, The Art of War, by military strategist Sun Tzu. In the 1990s, Khoo was the first Sun Tzu student in South-east Asia to link and teach the general's principles in relation to business and management. To date, Khoo has written over 26 business and management books, most of which are based on Sun Tzu's Art of War as he made it his life's mission to "suntzunize" as many people as possible. In 1997, although a Malaysian citizen, he was appointed as honorary Assistant Superintendent of Police by the Singapore Police Force in recognition for his contribution as consultant-trainer to the police force of Singapore. His first novel, Taikor, was nominated by the National Library of Malaysia for the 2006 International Dublin Literary Award. Since 1999, Khoo has gone into retirement and occasionally travels in Malaysia and Singapore.

== Life ==
=== Early years ===
Khoo was born in 1956 in the Penang state of Malaysia. He received his formal education at St. Xavier's Institution before leaving for Singapore in 1974, to continue his pre-university education at St. Joseph's Institution. After completing his studies in 1978, he worked as a journalist with The Star in Kuala Lumpur until 1980 when he joined Malaysia's largest sugar refinery, Malayan Sugar Manufacturing Company Berhad, as a personnel manager.

To help him in tackle the numerous challenging tasks he faced in Malayan Sugar then, his future wife, Judy Hwang, gave him some notes of her translation of Sun Tzu's Art of War from Chinese to English, as he is not conversant in Chinese. Khoo immediately took keen interest in the military treatise and began to learn and apply Sun Tzu's teachings into his work. Throughout his professional career, Sun Tzu's Art of War was his indispensable guide. Khoo married Judy, a former Taiwanese singer in early 1982. In 1983, he moved to Kuala Lumpur as sales and marketing manager. When Asian sugar baron Robert Kuok was invited to turn around the ailing Multi-Purpose group of companies in 1987, Khoo joined them as administration manager at Magnum Corporation. In 1989, he left Magnum to head the personnel and administration department of Metroplex Holdings Berhad, where he later became the general manager within just four months, managing The Mall shopping complex. Khoo initiated a series of management and sales policies that enabled The Mall to secure the 'Best Shopping Mall' award for two years in a row. In the same year, he began writing his first best-seller; War at Work – Applying Sun Tzu's Art of War in Today's Business World, which was a collection of memoranda based on Sun Tzu's Art of War he wrote to his managers at The Mall.

From the early 1980s, Khoo tried to pursue a Master of Business Administration (MBA) degree from various universities, but all of them rejected his application as he did not possess a first degree for admission. Khoo only had two professional diplomas – a Diploma in Administrative Management and a Certified Diploma in Accounting and Finance from ACCA. He finally received an unconditional offer from the University of Stirling after he impressed the visiting Director of the MBA programme showing how he managed the award-winning shopping mall. In 1989, accompanied by his wife, he left Malaysia to pursue his MBA studies in Scotland and graduated with Distinction in 1991. Instead of returning to Malaysia, he went to Singapore again to seek better opportunities there and was offered the job as Director of Operations for Kentucky Fried Chicken (KFC).

=== Retrenchment ===
In early 1994, Khoo was retrenched from KFC as a result of an ownership change. He said:

Months before leaving my office, I had already looked around for another job, but unfortunately, top jobs are hard to come by. I felt like a rōnin then. It occurred to me then that if no daimyō wanted to employ me, then I would be my own little warlord and employ myself.

From his home near Outram Park, Khoo set up Stirling Training & Management Consultants Pte Ltd, a training and consultancy firm, which assisted clients in planning and implementing strategies, and motivating their executives through his proprietary "Management: The Sun Tzu Way" programmes. He ran the company with his wife, who handles all the accounting and administration. Half of his time was spent elsewhere, conducting management seminars for businessmen and employees of multinational corporations. Khoo also lectured part-time on Strategic Management for Singapore Institute of Management's external degree programmes. In early 1999, he co-authored with Nigel Munro-Smith, a lecturer at RMIT University in Australia, to produce a book titled Reader Friendly Strategic Management that brings out the essentials of strategic management for beginners.

=== Early retirement ===
In 1999, at the age of 43, Khoo decided to 'hang up his sword' (as described in his own words) to live a quiet and leisurely life in Cameron Highlands of Malaysia, with his wife and their "four-legged son", Bandit, a Yorkshire Terrier to this very day. When asked on his decision to live in the mountains, Khoo said:

Life is more than work, work, work or just making money. I don't want to be like the preacher in the Book of Ecclesiastes who lamented that he looked on all labours that he had laboured to do, and he beheld only vanity and a striving after wind. We may not be very wealthy but we have made enough to live by since we do not subscribe to a lavish lifestyle. So why not have time to do the things we like to do for a change?

=== Commendation ===
As a consultant-trainer to the Singapore Police Force since 1995, Khoo has taught many police officers in Singapore how to use Sun Tzu's principles of "Generalship" to be effective leaders and team builders. In 1997, he was sent for intensive training and thereafter appointed as honorary Assistant Superintendent of Police (ASP) in recognition for his contribution to the police force of Singapore. On 1 July 2009, Khoo was promoted to the honorary rank of Deputy Superintendent of Police for his long years of service to the police force.

== His works ==
=== Sun Tzu series ===
Sun Tzu (pinyin: Sun Zi; c. 544 BC – 496 BC) was a native of the Qi state (now Huimin county in Shandong) during the Spring and Autumn period of Chinese history, that was characterised by warring factions and a fragmented state. He came to the attention of King He Lu of Wu, who was impressed by his 13-chapter military treatise, The Art of War. In 512 BC, He Lu made Sun Tzu his Commander-in-Chief of the Wu army. For almost 20 years, the armies of Wu were victorious over their hereditary enemies, the kingdoms of Chu and Yue. In 496 BC, after He Lu died from his wounds in battle, his son, Fu Chai succeeded him. After numerous victories in battles, Fu Chai became arrogant and began to indulge in merrymaking. In time, the king started to disregard Sun Tzu's counsel and began to distance himself from Sun Tzu. Sensing this, Sun Tzu wisely gave up his position and left Wu for Qi in retirement. Fu Chai and his generals did not follow Sun Tzu's precepts and his kingdom was subsequently conquered by Chu in 473 BC. Out of shame, Fu Chai committed suicide after he had fled with the remnants of his defeated army.

As a contemporary teacher of Sun Tzu's Art of War, Khoo has written over 26 books on business and management based on its principles such as:

- Crime Prevention: The Sun Tzu Way (2006)
- Win Without Fighting (2006)
- Applying Sun Tzu's Art of War (2002) – A six handguides collection
- Sun Tzu: The Keeper of CEO's Conscience (1997)
- Applying Sun Tzu's Art of War in Corporate Politics (1995)
- Sun Tzu and Management (1992)
- War at Work: Applying Sun Tzu's Art of War in Today Business World (1990)

His understanding to translate a complicated treatise into easy prose for a beginner, Khoo's Sun Tzu series were well received and continue to grow in scope and depth in later years. He adds realism by injecting real-life situations culled from his 15 years in management, that encourage readers to assess their own performance, and take positive measures to become more effective in their workplace and interpersonal relationships.

=== Novels ===
His first novel, Taikor, was released in late 2004. It is a historical saga of Malaya which traces the years 1922 to 1982, telling the story of Ya Loong, from his family's migration from South Thailand to Penang after his father's death. It was among the 132 entries nominated for the 2006 International Dublin Literary Award.

His second novel, Mamasan, is about life of those people working in the glitzy world of nightclubbing and their customers who patronise nightclubs. It was released in April 2007.

His third novel, Nanyang, is a historical saga about the multi-racial people who inhabit the lands of the 'Southern Ocean', as early Chinese migrants called Malaya and Singapore. It hit the book stores in October 2007.
