= Nasrollah Kasraian =

Iranian photographer (b. 1944)

- نصرالله کسرائیان
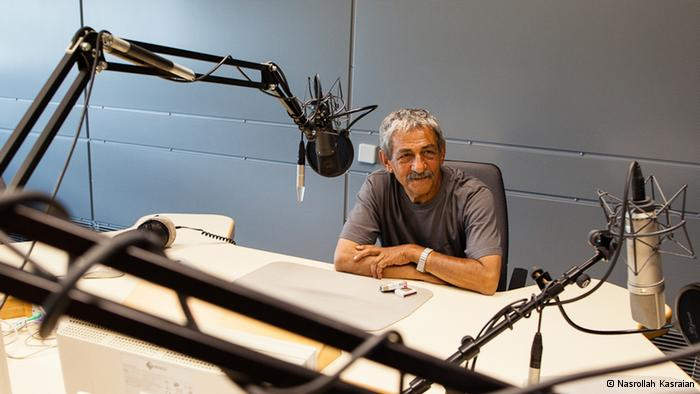
- Born: 1944 (age 81–82); Khorramabad, Imperial State of Iran
- Known for: Photography
- Spouse: Ziba Arshi

Nasrollah Kasraian (Persian: نصرالله کسرائیان; born 1944 in Khorramabad, Iran) is an internationally renowned Iranian photographer and has been called the "father of Iranian ethno-photography" and the "father of Iranian photography". He and his wife, anthropologist Ziba Arshi, have documented the lives of various populations living within the borders of Iran, while publishing more than 50 books and various other media. Kasraian's work on the Turkmens of Iran has been adapted for the screen by Babak Karimi. His work has initiated new branches of research, such as anthropological studies of Kurdistan. His work not only influenced a generation of Iranian photographers, but also had a significant impact on photographers outside of Iran and on contemporary documentary photography internationally.

== Biography ==
Nasrollah Kasraian was born in 1944 in Khorram Abad, in the province of Lorestan, Iran. A graduate in law from Tehran University, where he is recognized as a distinguished alumnus, Kasraian abandoned that profession and fully engaged in photography in 1966, citing an encounter with a French photographer as the decisive moment in his career.

Known as the father of Iranian ethnographic photography, Kasraian devoted his career to documenting Iran’s ethnic groups, nomadic tribes, rural communities, and natural landscapes. His work helped establish a distinctive visual language for ethnographic and documentary photography in Iran.

In early 1971, Kasraian was arrested by the Pahlavi regime due to his political activism. During his imprisonment, he translated his first book on photography. Following his release in 1975, he began working as a professional photographer.

Since then, Kasraian has published more than thirty-one photography books, many of them produced in collaboration with his wife, the anthropologist and educator Ziba Arshi, who accompanies him on his fieldwork and contributes ethnographic texts to their publications. His photographs have been exhibited and published both inside and outside Iran. In 2017, his work was shown in his first United States exhibition at the University of Maryland, presenting images of everyday life and Iran’s cultural diversity to international audiences.

As a result of his long career and international exposure, Kasraian influenced not only a generation of Iranian photographers but also photographers and scholars outside Iran engaged with documentary and cultural photography. In 2015, Gozaresh-e Yek Zendegi (Leaves from a Life), a selection of his photographs, was published in recognition of his lifelong contribution to Iranian photography.

Kasraian is married to Ziba Arshi; they have three daughters and live in Tehran. The Kasraian family, with several siblings also engaged in the arts, has had a notable impact on contemporary Iranian culture.

== Photography career ==
Kasraian travels around Iran taking pictures of all ethnic groups and publishes them in photobooks often dedicated to specific ethnicities. Kasraian has worked as a photographer for nearly five decades and has travelled extensively throughout Iran in the course of his work, covering more than three and a half million kilometres while documenting the country’s people, landscapes, and cultures. His long-term photographic practice has played a significant role in the development of documentary and ethnographic photography in Iran.

He recounts having used more than 28 cars during the years due to his extensive trips to remote areas of the country. The pictures are typically supplemented by detailed texts about everyday life, culture and history of the ethnic group, often written by Kasraian's wife Ziba Arshi, whose view as an anthropologist has had a strong impact on his work. Kasraian's aim is to depict the entire ethnological diversity of Iran, an endeavor generally applauded by Iranian population but not uncontroversial amongst more conservative elements of Iranian society.

Kasraian cites the publication of his photobook L'iran rurale by the renowned French publisher Doublepage as a turning point in his career. A further milestone is the publication of The Nomadic Peoples of Iran, edited by Richard Tapper and Jon Thompson and illustrated with hundreds of photographs by Kasraian. The book combines scholarly essays on tribal peoples with extensive visual documentation, and Kasraian’s work is featured throughout to complement the anthropological accounts.

The book Tehran, which includes works by Hamideh Zolfaqari, winner of the Prix de la Photographie Paris, displays the shift from traditionalism to modernity in the Iranian capital.

Kasraian’s works have been published in numerous international magazines, including GEO, Grands Reportages, Animan, and Altair. Kasraian's work has been exhibited in various countries, with his first U.S. photography exhibit hosted in 2017 at the University of Maryland. His autobiography was published in 2015 by artebox, an extensive interview in Persian with the artist about his life and work.

The cover of the book The Journey by Mahmoud Dowlatabadi, an Iranian novelist who is widely regarded as one of the foremost living figures in Persian literature, is a photograph by Kasraian.

Besides his work as a photographer, Kasraian has also translated books such as Andreas Feininger's The Complete Photographer into Persian.

== Educational work ==
Kasraian has also been active in photography education. He is the subject of 12 Lessons on Documentary Photography, an educational video course produced for the program New Page, in which he discusses his experiences in documentary and ethnographic photography. In the course, Kasraian addresses topics such as the influence of a photographer’s worldview on their work, research methods in photography, the relationship between ethnographic photography and cultural anthropology, ethical considerations, and maintaining independence as a photographer.

Kasraian is also active as a writer and poet. A selection of his poems has been translated into English and published in Nowruz Journal, reflecting his engagement with literary as well as visual forms of expression.

== Published photo books ==
- From Childhood.., 1982
- L’Iran rurale, 1984, ASIN B0037H8D0W
- Endless Journey, 1988
- Tehran, 1990, ASIN B001BTIJYI
- Isfahan, 1990, ASIN 9646728081
- Kurdistan, 1990, ISBN 978-964-416-203-9
- Kurds of Iran, 1993
- Shomal, 1996
- The North of Iran, 1995, Sekeh Press
- Deserts of Iran, 2010, ISBN 978-964-329-197-6
- Nature of Iran, 2000
- Mountains of Iran, 1998
- Abyaneh, 2008, ISBN 964-416-183-1
- Turkmans of Iran, 1991, ASIN B000MFMJMA
- Damavand, 1992, ISBN 964-6194-70-2
- Persepolis, 5th ed., 1998, ISBN 964-416-167-X
- Nomads of Iran, 2001, ISBN 964-416-184-X
- Our Homeland Iran, 2001, ISBN 964-416-170-X
- Masouleh, 2001, ISBN 978-964-416-182-7
- Nature of Iran, 2001, ASIN B00186YSEO
- Baluchistan, 2002, ISBN 978-964-416-203-9
- Postscripts: Desert, 2000, ISBN 978-964-557-138-0
- Postscripts: The Ship, 1999
- Postscripts: Doors and Windows
- The Architecture of Iran, 2004
- Bazaars of Iran, 2010
- Gozaresh-e Yek Zendegi (Leaves from a Life), 2015

== Collaborative works ==
The Nomadic Peoples of Iran, edited by Richard Tapper and Jon Thompson, 2002. Illustrated with extensive photographic documentation by Kasraian, whose images are integrated throughout the anthropological essays.
