= Staveley (surname) =

Staveley is a surname. Notable people with the surname include:

- Amanda Staveley (born 1973), British businesswoman
- Cecil Staveley (1874–1934), Royal Navy officer, son of Charles Staveley
- Charles Staveley (1817–1896), British general, son of William Staveley
- John Staveley (1914–2006), New Zealand haematologist
- Lilian Staveley (1871–1928), Christian writer and mystic
- May Staveley (1863–1934), British university teacher and warden
- Miles Staveley (fl. 1846–1870), English cricketer
- Ralph Staveley (c.1362-c.1420), English lord
- Thomas Staveley (1626-1684), English antiquary, magistrate, and anti-Catholic
- William Staveley (1784–1854), British general
- William Staveley (Royal Navy officer) (1928–1997)
