= Wong How Man =

Chinese explorer

- Chinese: 黃效文
- Born: Hong Kong
- Occupations: Explorer, Author, Photojournalist

Wong How Man (born 1949) is a Chinese explorer, writer and photojournalist from Hong Kong. Wong is the founder and President of the China Exploration & Research Society (CERS). In 2002, Time Magazine honored Wong as one of their 25 Asian Heroes, calling him 'China's most accomplished living explorer.

== Early life and education ==
Wong was born in Hong Kong. Wong studied in Wah Yan College, Kowloon in Hong Kong before studying journalism and art in the United States and earned degrees from the University of Wisconsin, River Falls, including an honorary doctorate.

== Career ==
In 1974, Wong began exploring China as a journalist.

In 1982, Wong became an explorer with National Geographic Society, until 1986.

In 1986, Wong founded the China Exploration & Research Society] (CERS), first in the United States and later moved to Hong Kong in 1994, a preeminent nonprofit organization specializing in exploration, research, conservation and education in remote China and periphery countries like Myanmar, Laos, Bhutan and the Philippines.

Wong led six major expeditions for the National Geographic magazine. His writing for the National Geographic was nominated for the Overseas Press Club Award of America. In his 1985 National Geographic expedition, Wong led a team that found a new source of the Yangtze River and documented this expedition in his 1989 book, Exploring the Yangtze: China's Longest River. During this expedition he came across the hanging coffins and developed a long life obsession with this particular historical custom, which later became the topic of an award-winning documentary by Discovery Channel. Twenty years later, Wong discovered a yet longer source. In 2004, Discovery Channel also made an hour-long documentary 'Crossings' about Wong's upbringing and subsequent exploration career. Subsequently, Wong led CERS expeditions that pinpointed the source of the Mekong in 2007 and discovered a new source for the Yellow River in 2008. In 2011, his team defined the source of the Salween River, followed by that for the Irrawaddy in 2017, and the Brahmaputra in 2018.

Wong has authored over two dozen books. Among these, From Manchuria to Tibet won the prestigious Lowell Thomas Travel Journalism Gold Award in 1999. His book Islamic Frontiers of China was published in the UK in 1990, with a new and expanded edition in 2011. Wong has received numerous awards, including the Distinguished Alumni Award from the University of Wisconsin in River Falls, Lifetime Achievement Award from Monk Hsing Yun. He is often invited as keynote speaker on important international lecture circuits for institutions, universities, corporations, both and select groups of audience.

Wong's organization, CERS, has conducted scores of successful conservation projects, many of which became full-length documentary films. His work and that of CERS has been featured on CNN over a dozen times, including a half-hour profile by anchor Richard Quest. His work has been featured on the front page of the Wall Street Journal and Al-Jazeera TV made a half-hour feature His nonprofit organization is mainly supported by private foundations and individuals. A large format book, Classic of Mountains and Seas: Wong How-Man and 30 Years of CERS (山海經) published in Taiwan, chronicled three decades of work of CERS.

In 2023 Wong is appointed by Westlake University in Hangzhou China as Fellow of Westlake Residential Colleges. In October 2023 the University of Hong Kong inaugurated the Wong How Man Centre for Exploration.

== Personal life ==
Wong lived in the United States until 1994 before moving back to Hong Kong.

== Bibliography ==
- Wong, How Man, Exploring the Yangtze: China's Longest River (China Books & Periodicals, 1989), ISBN 0-8351-2185-2
- Wong, How Man, Islamic Frontiers of China (Scorpion Publishing, 1990), ISBN 0-905906-83-7
- Wong, How Man, From Manchuria to Tibet (Odyssey Publications, 1998), ISBN 962-217-098-6
- Wong, How Man, Closer to Heaven - An Exploration Series (Commonwealth Publishing Group, 2001), ISBN 957-621-906-X
- Wong, How Man, Closer to Earth - An Exploration Series (Commonwealth Publishing Group, 2001), ISBN 957-621-907-8
- Wong, How Man, Black-necked Crane Rendezvous: Over a decade of exploration and conservation of an auspicious bird (Commonwealth Publishing Group, 2002), ISBN 986-417-046-5
- Wong, How Man, Nature at Heart (Commonwealth Publishing Group, 2003), ISBN 986-417-191-7
- Wong, How Man, Culture at Heart (Commonwealth Publishing Group, 2003), ISBN 986-417-192-5
- Wong, How Man, Holy Mountain, Hidden Valley (Commonwealth Publishing Group, 2007), ISBN 978-986-216-024-4
- Wong, How Man, Voyage of Discovery (Commonwealth Publishing Group, 2007), ISBN 978-986-216-025-1
- Wong, How Man, As River Flows (Commonwealth Publishing Group, 2009), ISBN 978-986-216-439-6
- Wong, How Man, Tales from Ancient Kingdom (Commonwealth Publishing Group, 2009), ISBN 978-986-216-440-2
- Wong, How Man, Treasures in Our Midst (Commonwealth Publishing Group, 2010), ISBN 978-986-216-629-1
- Wong, How Man, Heritage on Our Minds (Commonwealth Publishing Group, 2010), ISBN 978-986-216-630-7
- Wong, How Man, Adel Awni Dajani, Islamic Frontiers of China: Peoples of the Silk Road (I.B.Tauris Publishers, 2011), ISBN 978-1-84885-702-5
- Wong How Man, Nature As My Companion (Commonwealth Publishing Group, 2012), ISBN 978-986-320-052-9
- Wong How Man, Culture As My Friend (Commonwealth Publishing Group, 2012), ISBN 978-986-320-058-1
- Wong How Man, Boundless Nature (Commonwealth Publishing Group, 2013), ISBN 978-986-320-363-6
- Wong How Man, Borderless Culture (Commonwealth Publishing Group, 2013), ISBN 978-986-320-364-3
- Wong How Man, Pathway of Nature (Commonwealth Publishing Group, 2015), ISBN 978-986-320-897-6
- Wong How Man, Footprint of Culture (Commonwealth Publishing Group, 2015), ISBN 978-986-320-898-3
- Wong How Man, Nature My Fate (Ding Ding, 2016), ISBN 978-986-93841-0-0
- Wong How Man, Culture My Destiny (Ding Ding, 2016), ISBN 978-986-93841-1-7
- Wong How Man, Culture In My Thought (Ding Ding, 2017), ISBN 978-986-93841-5-5
- Wong How Man, Nature In My Mind (Ding Ding, 2017), ISBN 978-986-93841-6-2
- Wong How Man, Life as an Explorer - First Decade, 1974 - 1983 (Ding Ding, 2019) ISBN 978-986-97108-2-4
- Wong How Man, Enlightened Sojourn 2018 (Ding Ding, 2018) ISBN 978-986-93841-9-3
- Wong How Man, Enlightened Sojourn 2019 (Ding Ding, 2019) ISBN 978-986-97108-4-8
- Wong How Man, Enlightened Sojourn 2020-2021 (Ding Ding, 2021) ISBN 978-986-97108-8-6
- Wong How Man, Enlightened Sojourn 2022 (Ding Ding, 2022) ISBN 978-626-96174-2-5
- Wong How Man, Enlightened Sojourn 2023 (Ding Ding, 2023) ISBN 978-626-96174-4-9
- Wong How Man, Enlightened Sojourn 2024 Book I (Ding Ding, 2024) ISBN 978-626-96174-6-3
- Wong How Man, Enlightened Sojourn 2024 Book II (Ding Ding, 2024) ISBN 978-626-96174-7-0
- Wong How Man, Enlightened Sojourn 2025 (Ding Ding, 2025) ISBN 978-626-96174-9-4
