= Lourdes Urrea =

Mexican author, artist and speaker

Lourdes Urrea (born 17 July 1954) is a Mexican author, artist and speaker. She wrote her first poems at the age of twelve, and her first mystery story when she was sixteen years old. She is the author of the "Cuentos de Escalofrío" and "Castillo del Terror" series for young readers.

== Career ==
Urrea's short novels are used in the United States as reading material for bilingual middle graders. She is the author of "English for the Latin Student" and "Spanish for the Foreign Student" language textbooks, and of two books of poetry: "Versos Prohibidos" and "Historias familiares". Urrea's multimedia lecture "The Goodness of Reading" has been presented in libraries and schools around the world.

Urrea's writing depicts her vast traveling and her desire to give children a glimpse of the diversity of cultures in the world. Each of her stories takes place in a different country. In November 2008, Urrea was honored with the Doctor Honoris Causa appointment by the Latin American Council of Excellence in Education for her contribution to education in Latin American countries.

== Bibliography ==
- ISBN 970-20-0242-7 "Fuera de este mundo"
- ISBN 970-20-0245-1 "Los gatos muertos"
- ISBN 970-20-0339-3 "A través del cristal"
- ISBN 970-20-0357-1 "El dragón Chinese"
- ISBN 970-20-0243-5 "Huellas en la escalera"
- ISBN 970-20-0247-8 "Silencio en el castillo"
- ISBN 970-20-0248-6 "Vacaciones mortales"
- ISBN 970-20-0330-X "El Circo"
- ISBN 970-20-0244-3 "La gruta encantada"
- ISBN 970-20-0359-8 "El juego de ajedrez"
- ISBN 970-20-0360-1 "En busca de Dancu"
- ISBN 970-20-0311-3 "Un extraño mal"
- ISBN 970-20-0340-7 "Un juego peligroso"
- ISBN 970-20-0246-X "No juegues de noche"
- ISBN 970-20-0309-1 "Athon Labar"
- ISBN 970-20-0310-5 "El secreto gitano"
- ISBN 970-20-0189-7 "El mago"
- ISBN 970-20-0188-9 "El niño de la ventana"
- ISBN 970-20-0362-8 "El reloj de arena"
- ISBN 968-5920-14-1 "El regreso de Dancu"
- ISBN 968-5920-13-3 "Un fantasma en Navidad"
- ISBN 968-5920-06-0 "Una aventura en Mahali"
- ISBN 968-5920-07-9 "La niña del cuadro"
- ISBN 968-5920-08-7 "Cedric, una leyenda nueja"
