= Jolita Herlyn =

Lithuanian writer (born 1966)

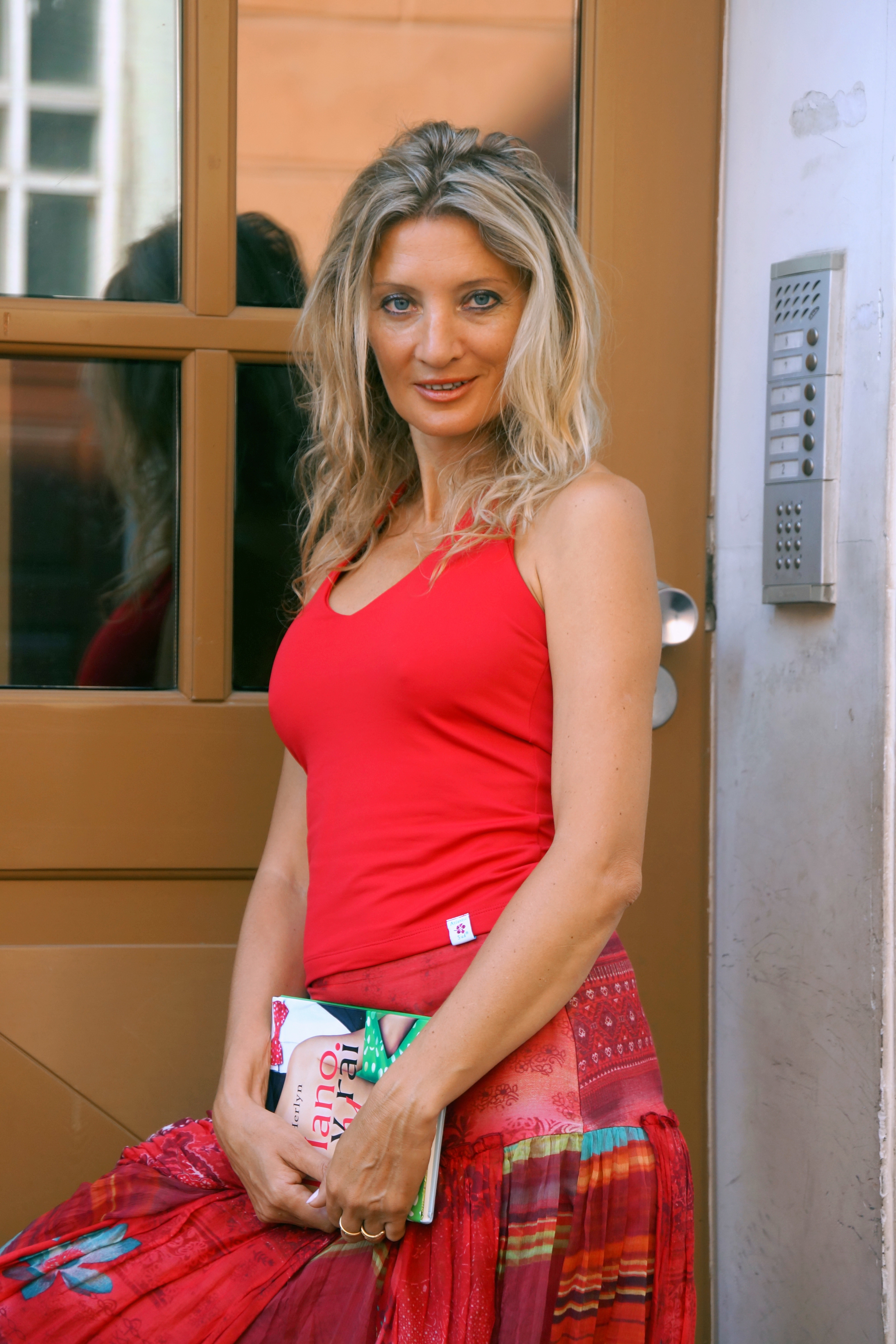
- Herlyn in Klaipėda, Lithuania, 2014
- Born: Jolita Kraniauskaitė; September 14, 1966; Vilnius, Lithuania
- Education: Master degree in Philosophy
- Alma mater: Moscow State University
- Occupation: Novelist
- Spouse: Sven Thomas Willy Herlyn (2008-present)
- Children: Karlas Eduardo Impinnisi, Jonas Herlyn

Jolita Herlyn (née Kraniauskaitė; born 14 September 1966, in Vilnius) is a Lithuanian novelist.

== Biography ==
In 1990, she graduated from Moscow Lomonosov university, having studied philosophy.

1990-1997 - Taught Philosophy and Logic at Klaipeda university.

1997-2005 - Worked in municipality of Klaipeda, department of foreign affairs. At the same time wrote multiple articles for local newspapers "Klaipėda" and "Vakarų Ekspresas".

2004-2005 - led a live TV show "Proto Aistros" on local television "Balticum Tv".

2006-2009 - Worked in DnB Nord in Copenhagen as a manager of marketing department.

2010 - Moved to Hamburg, Germany with her family and started writing novels.

2017-2025 Jolita Herlyn was one of the three most read national authors in Lithuanian libraries.

== Bibliography ==
- Trys mano vieninteliai: novel. - Vilnius: Alma littera, 2013. - 288p. - ISBN 978-609-01-1248-9
- Mano vyrai ir jų žmonos: novel. - Vilnius: Alma littera, 2014. - 264p. - ISBN 978-609-01-1583-1
- Svaigulys: novel. - Vilnius: Alma littera, 2015. - 240p. - ISBN 978-609-01-1948-8
- Atsargiai - moteris!: novel. - Vilnius: Alma littera, 2016. - 296p. - ISBN 978-609-01-2204-4
- Geismo spąstuose: novel. - Vilnius: Alma littera, 2016. - ISBN 978-609-01-2389-8
- Angelai neverkia: novel. – Vilnius: Alma littera, 2017. – ISBN 978-609-01-2931-9
- Veidu į saulę: novel – Vilnius : Alma littera, 2018. – ISBN 978-609-01-3460-3
- Žinau, kad nieko nežinau: novel - Vilnius :Alma littera, 2019 - ISBN 978-609-01-4033-8
- Šešėlių gaudytoja - Vilnius: Alma littera, 2020 - ISBN 978-609-01-4444-2
- Moterų sodas - Vilnius: Alma littera, 2021 - ISBN 978-609-01-4675-0
- Gėdos vaikas - Vilnius: Alma littera, 2022 - ISBN 978-609-01-5218-8
- Citrinmedžių vila - Vilnius: Alma littera, 2023 - ISBN 978-609-01-5667-4
- Atgimusi melodija - Vilnius: Alma littera, 2024 - ISBN 978-609-01-5887-6 - With author Irena Buivydaite.
- Nepažįstamoji - Vilnius: Alma littera, 2025 - ISBN 978-609-01-6452-5
- Tango šokamas dviese - Vilnius: Alma littera, 2026 - ISBN 978-609-01-6982-7 - With author Irena Buivydaite.
