= List of group-0 ISBN publisher codes =

A list of publisher codes for (978) International Standard Book Numbers with a group code of zero.

== Assignment ==
The group-0 publisher codes are assigned as follows:

Publisher number	Item number	Group identifier				Total possible books
Publisher number	Item number	From	To	Number of possible publisher codes	Books per publisher	Total possible books
2 digits	6 digits	0-00-xxxxxx-x	0-19-xxxxxx-x	20 (0.0035%)	1,000,000	20,000,000 (20%)
3 digits	5 digits	0-200-xxxxx-x 0-229-xxxxx-x 0-370-xxxxx-x 0-640-xxxxx-x 0-646-xxxxx-x 0-649-xxxxx-x 0-656-xxxxx-x	0-227-xxxxx-x 0-368-xxxxx-x 0-638-xxxxx-x 0-644-xxxxx-x 0-647-xxxxx-x 0-654-xxxxx-x 0-699-xxxxx-x	494 (0.085%)	100,000	49,400,000 (49%)
4 digits	4 digits	0-2280-xxxx-x 0-3690-xxxx-x 0-6390-xxxx-x 0-6550-xxxx-x 0-7000-xxxx-x	0-2289-xxxx-x 0-3699-xxxx-x 0-6397-xxxx-x 0-6559-xxxx-x 0-8499-xxxx-x	1,538 (0.27%)	10,000	15,380,000 (15%)
5 digits	3 digits	0-85000-xxx-x	0-89999-xxx-x	5,000 (0.86%)	1,000	5,000,000 (5.0%)
6 digits	2 digits	0-900000-xx-x 0-900372-xx-x	0-900370-xx-x 0-949999-xx-x	49,999 (8.6%)	100	4,999,900 (5.0%)
7 digits	1 digit	0-6398000-x-x 0-6450000-x-x 0-6480000-x-x 0-9003710-x-x 0-9500000-x-x	0-6399999-x-x 0-6459999-x-x 0-6489999-x-x 0-9003719-x-x 0-9999999-x-x	522,010 (90%)	10	5,220,100 (5.2%)
Total Possible Group-0 Codes:				579,061		100,000,000

== 2-digit publisher codes ==
Publisher code	Publisher	Additional imprints	Notes
00	William Collins; HarperCollins	Fontana; Flamingo; Flamingo Original; Science Fiction & Fantasy; Voyager; Angelus Media	
01	...		not yet assigned
02	Collier Books; Collier Macmillan	Alpha; Free Press; Glencoe; McGraw-Hill School Division; Schirmer Books	Complete Idiot's Guide series
03	Holt, Rinehart and Winston	Dryden Press; Harcourt Brace College; Harcourt Brace Jovanovich College; Saunders College	now part of Cengage Learning
04	George Allen & Unwin; Unwin Hyman	Orion; Unicorn; Unwin Paperbacks	now part of HarperCollins
05	Oliver & Boyd		was Edinburgh-based; imprint now owned by Pearson Education, code dormant
06	Harper & Row; Collins; HarperCollins, HarperOne, It Books, Zondervan Publishing House	Ecco; Harper Perennial; ReganBooks; Smithsonian Books; Rayo; Amistad	
07	McGraw Hill	…	
08	Pergamon; Pergamon Press	…	now part of Elsevier
09	Century Hutchinson; Geographia (Ltd); Random Century; Random House	Arrow; Ebury; Helicon; Legend; Vintage	Random House also 1-84605
10	HMSO	…	official UK government publications
11	HMSO	…	other official bodies' publications
12	Academic Press	Seminar Press	now part of Elsevier
13	Prentice Hall; John Wiley & Sons	Prentice-Hall International	now part of Pearson
14	Penguin Books	Arkana; Pelican; Puffin; Viking Penguin; Riverhead Books	codes 140, 141 are generated by non-standard hyphenation
15	Harcourt Brace Jovanovich	Harcourt Brace College; Harvest Books; James H. Silberman; Harcourt Religious Publishers; Harcourt Religion; Mariner Books	now part of Houghton Mifflin Harcourt
16	United States Government Publishing Office		
17	Thomas Nelson		was Glasgow-based; imprint now owned by HarperCollins, code dormant
18	…		not yet assigned
19	Oxford University Press	Clarendon Press; Oxford Paperbacks	

== 3-digit publisher codes ==
(Note: the status of codes not listed in this table is unclear; please help fill the gaps.)

Publisher code	Publisher	Additional imprints	Notes			
000~199	see #2-digit_publisher_codes					
200	Abelard-Schuman Ltd		children's books			
201	Addison-Wesley		now part of Pearson Group			
202	Aldine; Aldine Atherton					
203	Taylor & Francis	e-Library	electronic books			
204	Allman					
205	Allyn & Bacon		now part of Pearson Group			
206	Cape Goliard Press					
207	Angus & Robertson		now part of HarperCollins			
208	Archon Books					
209	Arco Publications	-	bought by the Gailranada group, later Wm. Collins Sons, now HarperCollins			
210	Asia Publishing House	…	an imprint of Verlagsgruppe Georg von Holtzbrinck			
211	Avis					
212	John Baker					
213	Arthur Barker					
214	Barrie & Jenkins; Barrie & Rockliff		now part of Random House			
215	The Stationery Office					
216	Blackie					
218	Anthony Blond		now part of Random House			
219	Blond Educational		now part of Pearson Education			
220	Business Books					
222	Burke Books					
223	Burns & Oates		now part of Bloomsbury Publishing			
224	Jonathan Cape		now part of Penguin Random House			
225	Geoffrey Chapman					
226	University of Chicago Press					
227	James Clarke					
228	see #4-digit_publisher_codes					
229	Adlard Coles Nautical	London, UK				
230	Palgrave Macmillan		not used before 2007			
231	Columbia University Press					
232	Darton, Longman & Todd	Paulist Press				
233	André Deutsch		Carlton Books			
234	Dennis Dobson		taken over by Routledge and Kegan Paul?			
236	Elek					
237	Evans Brothers					
238	Evelyn, Adams and Mackay	Hugh Evelyn; Adams & Dart,				
240	Focal Press		now part of Elsevier			
241	Hamish Hamilton		now part of Penguin Random House			
245	Harrap					
246	Rupert Hart-Davis	Voyager	now part of HarperCollins			
247	Hart-Davis Educational					
248	Cresset Press					
249	Leonard Hill; Morgan-Grampian					
250	Ann Arbor Science					
251	Icon Books					
252	University of Illinois Press	Champaign, Illinois, US				
253	Indiana University Press					
255	Institute of Economic Affairs					
256	Richard D. Irwin; Dorsey Press; Irwin-Dorsey International					
257	Herbert Jenkins					
258	Crosby Lockwood; Crosby Lockwood Staples					
261	Grafton		now part of HarperCollins			
262	MIT Press					
263	Mills & Boon					
264	A. R. Mowbray					
268	University of Notre Dame Press					
269	Pall Mall Press					
271	Pennsylvania State University Press					
272	Pitman Medical					
273	Pitman Press					
275	Praeger		now part of the Greenwood Publishing Group			
276	Reader's Digest Press					
278	Reinhold		part of Van Nostrand Reinhold?			
280	Rivingtons					
281	S.P.C.K.					
283	Sidgwick & Jackson		now part of Pan Books			
284	Skilton					
285	Souvenir Press					
286	Staples Press		later part of Crosby Lockwood Staples?			
289	Studio Vista					
291	Technical Press					
292	University of Texas Press					
295	University of Washington Press					
296	C. A. Watts					
297	Weidenfeld & Nicolson		now part of Orion Publishing Group			
298	Weidenfeld & Nicolson Educational		now part of Orion Publishing Group			
299	University of Wisconsin Press					
300	Yale University Press					
301	Pemberton Books					
302	Zwemmer					
303	Weidenfeld & Nicolson		now part of Orion Publishing Group			
304	Cassell		London, UK; now part of Orion Publishing Group			
305	Jackdaw		(educational multi-media)			
306	Da Capo Press; Consultants Bureau, and Kluwer Academic (NY)					
307	originally assigned to Western Publishing	Random House; Alfred A. Knopf; Borzoi Books; Vintage; Crown Publishing Group; Anchor Books; Little Golden Books; Golden Press	now part of Penguin Random House			
308	Funk & Wagnalls					
309	National Academy of Sciences					
310	Zondervan					
312	St Martin's Press	Griffin; Picador	originally the US division of Macmillan; now owned by Holtzbrinck Publishers			
313	Greenwood Press	Westport, Connecticut, US				
314	West Publishing					
316	Hachette	Little, Brown; Back Bay Books; Yen Press				
317	UMI Books on demand					
318	UMI Books on demand					
319	Ordnance Survey (UK)					
321	Addison-Wesley; Peachpit	New Riders				
323	C. V. Mosby		now part of Elsevier			
324	South-Western College Publishing					
325	Heinemann		US division			
330	Pan Books, Pan Macmillan, Time Warner	Picador	now owned by Holtzbrinck Publishing			
333	Macmillan	Nature Publishing Group				
334	SCM Press					
335	Open University					
337	HMSO		used by Northern Ireland division			
338	Stationery Office (TSO, ex HMSO)		used by Scottish division			
339	Stationery Office (TSO, ex HMSO)		used by Northern Ireland division			
340	Hodder & Stoughton, Hodder Headline	Coronet, Hodder & Stoughton Educational, New English Library (NEL), Sceptre				
345	Ballantine Books, Del Rey	now part of Penguin Random House	New York			
347	Saxon House					
348	Stationery Office (TSO, ex HMSO)					
349	Sphere Books	Abacus				
351	Sphere Books	Cardinal				
352	Star Books	W. H. Allen Ltd.				
354	Macdonald and Jane's	London	later taken over by Springer?			
356	Macdonald; Queen Anne Publishers/Macdonald and Jane's	London				
361	Purnell and Sons					
362~368	?					
369	see #4-digit_publisher_codes					
370	The Bodley Head	Max Reinhardt				
373	Harlequin	Mills & Boon, Silhouette, Steeple Hill, Love Inspired, HQN				
374	Farrar, Straus & Giroux	Sarah Crichton Books	an imprint of Verlagsgruppe Georg von Holtzbrinck			
375	Random House	Pantheon Books, Vintage Books, Knopf	various imprints/divisions of Penguin Random House			
377	Friendship Press					
378	Ward Ritchie Press					
379	Oceana Publications					
380	HarperCollins	Avon; HarperEntertainment; Perennial				
382	General Learning Press; Silver Burdett					
384	Johnson Reprint					
385	Doubleday	Anchor; Bond Street; Dial Press; Image; Delta Trade Paperback; Spiegel & Grau; Crown Business	now part of Random House			
387	Springer					
388	ООО "Питер Пресс" (rus. Piter Press)					
389	Barnes & Noble					
390	Appleton-Century-Crofts					
393	W. W. Norton					
394	Alfred A. Knopf	Pantheon; Vintage	now part of Random House's Knopf Doubleday group.			
395	Houghton Mifflin	American Heritage; Mariner Books; Sandpiper				
396	Dodd, Mead					
397	Lippincott		now part of Wolters Kluwer			
398	Charles C. Thomas					
399	G. P. Putnam's Sons	Berkley; Capricorn; Perigree Trade				
402	Cowles Book Co. (New York)					
403	Scholarly Press					
404	AMS Press					
405	Arno Press, also Benjamin Press					
406	Butterworths		legal titles; now part of Reed Elsevier			
407	Butterworths		medical titles; now part of Reed Elsevier			
408	Butterworths		scientific and technical titles; now part of Reed Elsevier			
409	Butterworths		South Africa division			
411	HarperCollins Audio					
412	Chapman & Hall		now part of Taylor & Francis			
413	Methuen	Methuen Drama				
415	Routledge, CRC Press, Taylor & Francis	…	used from 1988; also 1-85941			
416	Methuen					
417	Methuen	Eyre Methuen; Magnum; Methuen paperbacks				
419	Spon		Part of Taylor & Francis Group			
420	Stevens & Sons					
421	Sweet & Maxwell					
422	Tavistock					
423	Methuen	Methuen Educational; Thames Methuen				
424	Sydney University Press					
425	Berkley Publishing	…	an imprint of Penguin Group (USA) since 1985			
426	Tandem Publishing	Tandem Books, Target Books, Universal Books	bought by W. H. Allen Ltd.			
431	Heinemann					
432	Peter Davies					
433	Heinemann Medical, LexisNexis Canada					
434	William Heinemann					
435	Heinemann Educational					
436	Secker & Warburg		now part of Random House			
437	World's Work					
439	Scholastic	Arthur A Levine Books				
440	Dell	Delacorte Press; Laurel; Merloyd Lawrence; Seymour Lawrence	now part of Penguin Random House			
441	Ace Books	Ace Books, Ace Charter Books, Charter Books	now part of Penguin Random House			
442	D. Van Nostrand; Van Nostrand Reinhold					
443	Churchill Livingstone		now part of Elsevier			
444	North-Holland	an imprint of Elsevier				
445	Popular Library	Popular Library, Questar series	bought by Warner Books			
446	Warner Books	Warner Books, Questar series, Aspect Books	Business Plus; Twelve; Grand Central Publishing	purchased by Hachette Book Group USA		
448	Grosset & Dunlap; Paddington Press	Tempo Books	now part of Penguin Random House			
449	Ballantine Books	Fawcett Columbine	now part of Penguin Random House			
450	New English Library	bought by Hodder & Stoughton, Hodder Headline				
451	New American Library	Signet; Roc Books; Mentor	now part of Penguin Random House			
452	New American Library	Plume	now part of Penguin Random House			
455	Law Book Company		(Australia)			
456	Methuen		Australian division			
458	Methuen		Canadian division			
459	Carswell					
460	Dent	Everyman's Library	now part of Orion Publishing Group			
461	Marshall Cavendish		now part of Times Publishing Group			
465	Basic Books	Civitas				
470	Wiley	Halsted Press; Jossey-Bass				
471	Wiley	Frommer?				
472	University of Michigan Press					
473	(various New Zealand Societies' publications)					
475	Victoria University of Wellington					
477	New Zealand DSIR					
478	Government of New Zealand					
485	Athlone Press		University of London			
486	Dover Publications					
490	Aldus Books					
491	W. H. Allen		now part of Virgin Books			
495	Thomson Wadsworth	Thomson Brooks/Cole				
498	A. S. Barnes					
500	Thames & Hudson					
510	Ernest Benn					
511	Cambridge University Press		used for electronic books			
515	Jove Books	part of Harcourt	now part of Penguin Random House			
516	Childrens Press					
517	Crown Publishers	Avenel Books; Bonanza Books; Crescent Books; Gramercy Books; Harrison House; Wings Books; often as distributor	now part of Penguin Random House			
518	Books for Libraries Press					
520	University of California Press					
521	Cambridge University Press					
522	Melbourne University Press		worldwide distribution by Cambridge University Press			
523	Pinnacle Books					
525	E. P. Dutton	now part of Penguin Random House				
527	Kraus Reprint					
528	Rand McNally College Publishing					
529	Collins (U.S. division); World Catholic Press		Collins U.S. division is now part of HarperCollins			
531	Franklin Watts					
532	Pleasure Books					
533	Vantage Press					
534	Wadsworth; Brooks/Cole		now part of The Thomson Corporation			
536	Simon & Schuster Custom Publishing; Pearson Custom Publishing					
538	South-Western Publishing					
540	George Philip					
542	UMI Press		theses			
543	Adamant	Elibron Classics				
544	Houghton Mifflin Harcourt					
545	Scholastic	Arthur A Levine Books				
547	Houghton Mifflin Company	Mariner	Boston, MA			
548	Kessinger		print on demand			
550	W. & R. Chambers					
551	Marshalls; Marshall Pickering		now part of HarperCollins			
552	Corgi	Black Swan, Corgi; 553 Bantam (UK); with 593 Bantam Press, 385 Doubleday (UK) hardcover imprints	London, UK; paperback division of Transworld Publishers Ltd.; now part of Penguin Random House			
553	Bantam Books	…	now part of Penguin Random House			
554	Bastion Books		(Canada)			
558	Pearson Custom					
559	Bibliolife					
560	E. J. Arnold; Arnold-Wheaton					
562	Sampson Low					
563	BBC Publications		now BBC Worldwide			
564	British & Foreign Bible Society					
565	British Museum					
566	Gower Publishing					
567	T. & T. Clark		now part of Continuum International			
569	Collets	Lincoln Davies				
570	Concordia Publishing House					
571	Faber & Faber; Faber Music					
572	Foulsham					
573	Samuel French					
574	Science Research Associates					
575	Gollancz	sold to Houghton Mifflin, sold on to Cassell PLC, sold to Orion/Random House (UK);	now part of Penguin Random House			
576	Gregg International					
578	(Numerous small presses)		Apparently being used for single ISBNs			
580	British Standards Institution					
582	Longman	…	an imprint of Pearson Education			
583	Mayflower Books Ltd., bought by Granada group, part of Granada Publishing,	being subsumed into Granada Books imprint when publishing interests bought by	William Collins' Sons and renamed Grafton, now part of HarperCollins			
584	Frederick Muller					
586	Panther Books	Panther Books, Paladin Books, Triad Panther, Triad Granada		Hamilton & Co. (Stafford) Ltd., re-named Panther Books Ltd. after successful imprint;	bought by Granada Group Ltd, bought by Wm. Collins' Sons, being subsumed into	Grafton imprint when Collins group merged with Harper & Row to form HarperCollins
589	Reed Publishing	A. H. & A. W. Reed; Reed Education	(New Zealand)			
590	Scholastic	Four Winds Press				
592	Iliffe					
593	Bantam Books	UK division of Transworld Publishers Ltd.	now part of Penguin Random House			
594	The Weinstein Company		manufactured + distributed by Genius Products, LLC.			
595	Authors Choice Press; Writers Club Press					
596	O'Reilly					
600	Hamlyn					
601	Hamlyn					
602	Ginn		now part of Pearson Education			
607	US Geological Survey					
608	UMI Books on Demand					
609	Crown Publishing Group	Clarkson Potter; Harmony Books; Three Rivers Press	now part of Penguin Random House			
610	Kelly's Directories					
611	Reed Information Services		later Reed Elsevier			
612	UMI		theses			
614	American Concrete Institute					
615	(Numerous small presses)		Apparently being used for single ISBNs			
617	IPC Business Press	Community Care				
618	Houghton Mifflin	Mariner Books	now part of Houghton Mifflin Harcourt			
619	Course Technology		now part of Cengage Learning			
620	(various South African imprints)					
621	(South Africa Government Printer)					
624	Tafelberg		(South Africa)			
627	J. L. van Schaik		(South Africa)			
631	Basil Blackwell	Cambridge				
632	Blackwell Scientific					
634	Hal Leonard Corporation					
636	Maskew Miller Longman		(South Africa)			
637~638	?					
639	see #4-digit_publisher_codes & #7-digit_publisher_codes					
640~641	?					
642	Australian Government Publishing Service					
643	CSIRO					
644	Australian Government Publishing Service					
645	see #7-digit_publisher_codes					
646	(various Australian organizations)					
647	?					
648	see #7-digit_publisher_codes					
649~654	?					
655	see #4-digit_publisher_codes					
656~657	?					
658	NTC Publishing Group; NTC/Contemporary Publishing Group; National Textbook Company	Passport Books	now part of McGraw-Hill Professional?			
660	Supply and Services Canada	National Museums of Canada	(Government publisher)			
662	Supply and Services Canada		(Government publisher)			
664	Westminster Press					
665	Canadian Institute for Historical Microreproductions					
667	Microfilming Corporation of America					
668	Arco Publishing					
669	Lexington Books		now part of Rowman & Littlefield			
670	Viking Press		now part of Penguin Random House			
671	Simon & Schuster	Archway Paperback; Minstrel Books; Pocket Books; Prentice Hall General Reference; Touchstone; Washington Square Press; Fireside Books	formerly under Gulf+Western			
672	SAMS Publishing	Howard W. Sams; Bobbs-Merrill	now under Pearson Education			
673	Scott, Foresman					
674	Harvard University Press	Belknap Press; Loeb Classical Library; I Tatti Renaissance Library				
675	Charles E. Merrill					
676	Vintage Canada	Borzoi; Knopf Canada	now part of Penguin Random House			
677	Gordon and Breach		now part of Taylor & Francis			
678	Augustus M. Kelly		reprint editions			
679	Random House; Alfred A. Knopf	Borzoi; Vintage Books; Vintage International; Pantheon Books; Fodor's Travel Publications	now part of Penguin Random House			
681	Longmeadow Press					
682	Exposition Press					
683	Lippincott Williams & Wilkins		now part of Wolters Kluwer			
684	Scribners	Touchstone; Free Press; Fireside Books	now part of Simon & Schuster also Harvard Medical School?			
685	UMI Books on Demand					
687	Abingdon Press	…	Nashville, TN			
688	William Morrow & Company	Quill; Eagle Brook; Morrow Junior Books; Rob Weisbach; Lothrop, Lee & Shepard	now part of HarperCollins			
689	Simon & Schuster	Aladdin Paperbacks; Atheneum Books; Simon Pulse; Simon Spotlight				
690	Thomas Y. Crowell		now part of HarperCollins			
691	Princeton University Press					
692	(Numerous small presses)		Apparently being used for single ISBNs			
694	HarperCollins	Harper Festival				
695	Association Press	Follett Publishing				
696	Meredith Books					
697	Wm C. Brown	Dushkin/Brown & Benchmark				
698	Coward, McCann & Geoghegan					
699	?					

== 4-digit publisher codes ==
(Note: many codes are not yet listed in this table; please help fill the gaps.)

Publisher code	Publisher	Notes
2000~2279	see #3-digit_publisher_codes	
2280~2289	?	
2290~3689	see #3-digit_publisher_codes	
3690~3699	?	
3700~6389	see #3-digit_publisher_codes	
6390~6397	?	
6398~6399	see #7-digit_publisher_codes	
6400~6449	see #3-digit_publisher_codes	
6450~6459	see #7-digit_publisher_codes	
6460~6479	see #3-digit_publisher_codes	
6480~6489	see #7-digit_publisher_codes	
6490~6549	see #3-digit_publisher_codes	
6550~6559	?	
6560~6999	see #3-digit_publisher_codes	
7000	J. & A. Churchill	
7001	Gale & Polden	
7002	Intertext Books	
7003	British Railways Board	
7004	Olympia Press	
7005	National Foundation for Educational Research	
7006	University Press of Kansas	
7007	Curzon Press	
7008	Electrical Research Association	
7010	Chatto & Windus Educational; Hart-Davis Educational	
7011	Chatto & Windus	now part of Random House
7012	Hogarth Press	
7016	Jacaranda Press	
7017	University of Newcastle (UK)	
7020	Baillière, Tindall	now part of Elsevier
7021	Juta and Co. (South Africa)	
7022	University of Queensland Press	St. Lucia, Queensland, Australia
7025	Bharatiya Vidya Bhavan (India)	
7028	Bartholomew	
7043	Quartet	
7044	Birmingham University (UK)	
7045	Wildwood House	
7049	University of Reading; Whiteknights Press	
7051	Mitre Press	
7054	Time-Life International	
7055	Victoria University Press	
7057	Elmfield Press	
7058	Atomic Energy Research Establishment (AERE)	
7061	Oak Tree Press	
7062	Ward Lock Educational	
7063	Ward Lock	now part of Penguin Books
7064	Octopus Books	London, UK
7065	Israel Program for Scientific Translations	
7067	Davis-Poynter	
7068	Sceptre Press	
7069	Vikas Publications (India)	
7071	John Gifford	
7073	Scottish Academic Press	
7076	Stationery Office (Ireland)	
7078	National Trust	
7079	Newman Books; Hemming Information Services	
7081	Australian National University Press	
7083	University of Wales Press	Also 1-84771
7084	Macaulay Institute; Soil Survey of England and Wales	
7085	Inner London Education Authority (ILEA)	
7087	nferNelson; GL Assessment	
7088	Futura Publications	later part of Macdonald?
7089	Ulverscroft	specialist large-print publisher
7090	Robert Hale	
7091	Robert Hale	
7092	Paddington Press	
7093	Birmingham City Council	
7095	British Tourist Authority	
7099	Croom Helm	
7100	Routledge and Kegan Paul	
7102	Routledge and Kegan Paul	now part of Taylor & Francis
7103	Kegan Paul International	
7105	Peter Haddock Ltd	Bridlington, UK; taken over by DC Thomson
7106	Jane's Publishing	
7108	Harvester Press	
7110	Ian Allan	Hersham, England
7112	Windward Books	
7114	Godwin	
7117	Jarrold Publishing	
7119	Omnibus Press; Wise Publications	
7121	Macdonald and Evans	
7123	British Library	
7126	Century; Century Books	now part of Random House; also Hutchinson Ltd; also Pimlico
7129	Dawsons of Pall Mall	
7130	Woburn Press	London, England, UK/Tokowa, New Jersey, US/Portland, Oregon, US
7131	Edward Arnold	later part of Hodder & Stoughton, now Hodder Headline
7134	Batsford	London, England; now part of Anova Books
7135	George Bell & Sons	
7136	A & C Black	also Theatres Trust
7137	Blandford Press	London, UK
7138	Bles	
7139	Allen Lane	London, UK; hardback division of Penguin Books
7140	British Publishing	
7141	British Museum Publications	
7145	Marion Boyars	formerly Calder & Boyars
7146	Frank Cass	London, England, UK; Portland, Oregon, US; also Routledge
7147	Mir Publishers; Progress Publishers (USSR)	
7148	Phaidon Press	
7150	Chester House Publications	
7151	Church Information Office Publishing	
7152	Saint Andrew Press	also 0-86153
7153	David & Charles	Newton Abbot, England
7154	Christopher Davies	
7156	Duckworth	
7157	Holmes-McDougall	
7158	EP Publishing	
7160	Elliot Right Way	now part of Constable & Robinson
7161	Gower Press	
7162	Epworth Press	
7163	Fabian Society	
7164	Faith Press	
7165	Irish University Press	later Irish Academic Press
7167	W. H. Freeman; Scientific American Library	
7168	Greater London Council	
7171	Gill and Macmillan (Ireland)	
7172	Groupe Polygone Editeurs; Grolier Book Club, Scholastic, Early Moments	
7175	Hulton Press	
7176	Health and Safety Executive (UK)	
7178	International Publishers (New York)	
7179	Johnston and Bacon	
7181	Michael Joseph	
7182	Kaye and Ward	
7183	William Kimber	London, UK
7184	Departments of the Environment and Transport: Library (UK)	
7185	Leicester University Press	
7186	H. K. Lewis & Co. Ltd.	
7187	University of London	
7188	Lutterworth Press	
7189	Luzac	
7190	Manchester University Press	Manchester, UK
7191	Cornmarket Press	now Haymarket Media Group
7192	Methodist Church: Division of Education and Youth	
7194	Castle House Publications	
7195	John Murray	
7197	National Christian Education Council	
7198	Northwood Publications	
7199	National Council of Social Service	later National Council for Voluntary Organisations
7200	Amgueddfa Genedlaethol Cymru = National Museum Wales	Cardiff, Wales
7201	Mansell	
7202	James Nisbet	
7204	North-Holland Publishing	now part of Elsevier
7205	Outposts Publications	
7206	Peter Owen Publishers	
7207	Pelham Books	
7208	Pickering & Inglis	
7210	Cement and Concrete Association	later British Cement Association
7211	W. Reeves	
7212	Regency Press	
7214	Wills & Hepworth	publisher of Ladybird Books
7216	Saunders Publishing	now part of Elsevier
7217	Schofield Sims	
7219	Shaw and Sons	
7220	Sheed and Ward	
7221	Sphere Books	
7223	Arthur H. Stockwell	
7225	Thorsons Publishing	
7226	Kestrel Books	
7227	Continua	
7228	Zeno	
7230	Times Books	licensed to Henry Holt and Company
7231	University Tutorial Press	
7232	Frederick Warne & Co	
7234	Wolfe Publishing	
7235	World International Publishing	
7236	John Wright and Sons	
7240	[State of] New South Wales (Australia)	
7241	[State of] Victoria (Australia)	
7242	Cairns	
7243	[State of] South Australia	
7245	Northern Territory (Australia)	
7248	Prentice-Hall of Australia	
7251	Macmillan Company of Australia	
7254	Ure Smith	
7256	Hawthorn Press; Aureal Publications	
7258	Flinders University of South Australia	
7259	University of Newcastle, Australia	
7263	Summer Institute of Linguistics (New Guinea)	
7267	Edward Arnold (Australia)	
7273	Pentech Press	
7275	Aquila	
7277	Thomas Telford Ltd	(usually for the Institution of Civil Engineers)
7278	Severn House	
7279	British Medical Association (BMA)	
7281	Aims for Freedom and Enterprise	
7282	Estates Gazette	
7285	White Lion Publishers	
7286	University of London: School of Oriental and African Studies (SOAS)	
7287	Arts Council of Great Britain	
7289	Becket	
7291	Open Books	
7292	National Economic Development Office (NEDO)	
7293	Grant & Cutler	
7294	Voltaire Foundation	
7295	Holt, Rinehart and Winston (Australia); Harcourt Brace Jovanovich (Australia); Saunders/Baillière Tindall (Australia)	
7299	Pitman Publishing (Australia)	
7300	Deakin University	
7301	Reed International (Australia)	Chatswood, Australia
7305	DSP Resource Productions (Disadvantaged Schools' Programme)	(Australia: NSW)
7308	South Australian Sports Institute	
7313	Art Gallery of New South Wales	
7315	Australian National University	
7317	Department of Defence (Australia)	
7318	Simon & Schuster (Australia)	
7322	Collins Australia	
7325	University of Melbourne	
7326	Monash University	
7327	Mimosa Publications; Shortland Publications (New Zealand)	
7329	Macmillan of Australia	
7333	ABC Books (Australian Broadcasting Corporation)	
7339	Addison Wesley; Longman;Pearson; Prentice Hall (Australia)	
7340	University of Melbourne	
7347	Art Gallery of New South Wales	
7352	Penguin Press	New York
7354	American Institute of Physics	
7355	Aspen Publishers	now part of Wolters Kluwer
7356	Microsoft Press	
7357	New Riders Press	now part of Pearson Education
7358	North-South	
7360	Human Kinetics	
7368	Bridgestone Books	
7369	Harvest House Publishers	
7375	Biblical Studies Press	
7377	Greenhaven Press	now part of Gale
7382	Perseus Books; Da Capo Press	also Basic Books
7385	Arcadia Publishing	Charleston, South Carolina, US
7386	Research & Education Association	
7388	Xlibris Corporation	self- and on-demand publisher
7389	Sony Wonder	a division of Sony BMG Music Entertainment
7391	Lexington Books	now part of Rowman & Littlefield
7399	Rod and Staff Publishers	
7407	Andrews McMeel Publishing	
7414	Infinity Publishing	
7425	Rowman & Littlefield	
7432	Simon & Schuster, Scribner	Fireside; Touchstone; Free Press
7433	Clocktower Books (formerly Clocktower Fiction)	Since 1996; refs include ITW-recognized ; SF-Encyclopedia
7434	Pocket Books	various imprints, a division of Simon and Schuster
7435	Simon and Schuster	
7445	Walker Books	
7546	Scolar Press	Mereston, Yorkshire
7448	Ark Paperbacks	
7449	Adamantine Press	
7450	Wheatsheaf; Harvester Wheatsheaf	
7451	Cherrytree Press; Chivers Press	(Chivers is large-print)
7453	Pluto Press	
7456	Polity Press	Oxford, England, UK; Malden, Massachusetts, US
7458	Ellis Horwood	
7459	Lion Publishing	
7460	Usborne Publishing	
7462	MTP Press	
7463	Northcote House	
7464	Business and Technology Education Council	
7465	Oriental University Press	
7466	Harcourt Brace Jovanovich (Educational)	
7467	Storm Publishing	Amblecote, UK
7470	Christopher Helm Publishers	
7471	Harrap-Columbus	publisher of the Rough guides
7472	Headline	
7474	Sphere Books	Cardinal imprint
7475	Bloomsbury Publishing	
7476	Van Nostrand Reinhold (International)	
7478	Shire Publications	
7480	HMSO: Scottish Office	
7483	A. T. Foulks Lynch	
7484	Taylor and Francis	
7486	Edinburgh University Press	
7487	Stanley Thornes	Cheltenham, UK
7488	Improvement and Development Agency (UK)	
7490	Allison & Busby	
7491	Pearson Education	
7492	Open University Press	now part of McGraw-Hill
7493	Mandarin Publishing	
7494	Kogan Page	
7495	The Automobile Association (AA)	
7496	Gloucester Press	
7497	Mammoth	(children's books)
7498	Egmont World	
7499	Piatkus	
7500	Simon & Schuster	(children's)
7501	Simon & Schuster	(educational)
7502	Wayland	
7503	Adam Hilger	now part of Taylor & Francis
7504	National Assembly for Wales	
7505	Magna Large Print Books	Long Preston, UK
7506	Butterworth-Heinemann, Architectural Press	now part of Reed Elsevier
7507	Falmer Press	London, UK/Philadelphia, Pennsylvania, US
7509	Sutton Publishing	also Alan Sutton; now part of The History Press
7512	Gregg Revivals	
7513	Dorling Kindersley	
7514	Blackie Academic & Professional	
7515	Warner Books	
7517	BPP Learning Media	
7518	British Geological Survey	
7520	Longman Law	
7521	Health Education Authority	
7522	Boxtree; Channel 4 Books	now part of Macmillan
7524	Tempus Publishing	now part of The History Press
7525	Parragon	
7528	Orion Books	
7530	London School of Economics and Political Science	
7531	ISIS	
7534	Kingfisher	
7535	Virgin Books	
7536	Primary Source Media	
7537	Octopus Publishing Group	
7538	Phoenix Books	
7540	Chivers	now part of BBC Audiobooks
7541	Minerva Press	
7545	Tolley	
7546	Ashgate Publishing	Aldershot, Hants, England, UK/Burlington, Vermont, US
7548	Lorenz	
7551	House of Stratus	
7553	Headline Book Publishing	Review
7557	Stationery Office (Éire)	
7559	The Stationery Office (Scotland)	
7566	DK Publishing Special Markets	
7567	Diane Publishing	
7573	HCI Teens	
7575	Kendall/Hunt Publishing	
7577	Apostolic Book Publishers	
7579	Kalmus	
7586	Concordia Publishing House	
7591	AltaMira Press	now part of Rowman & Littlefield
7595	iPublish.com	Created in February 2000 as the ebook publishing division of Time Warner, it ceased business in December 2001.
7596	1st Books Library	a print on demand publisher
7600	Course Technology	now part of Cengage Learning
7603	Motorbooks International	
7607	Barnes & Noble Books	
7611	Workman Publishing	also 0-911104
7613	Twenty-First Century Books; Millbrook Press	now part of Lerner Publishing Group
7614	Marshall Cavendish	
7615	Forum/Prima Lifestyles	
7616	Therapy Skill Builders	later part of Harcourt Assessment
7618	University Press of America	
7619	SAGE Publications	
7623	JAI Press	now part of Elsevier
7624	Running Press	Philadelphia
7625	Running Press	Philadelphia
7627	TwoDot; Globe Pequot	San Francisco
7631	Browntrout Publishers	
7636	Candlewick	
7637	Jones and Bartlett Publishers	
7641	Barron's Educational Series	
7643	Schiffer Publishing	
7644	Group Publishing	
7645	IDG Books Worldwide	originator of the "X for dummies" series, now published by Wiley
7648	Liguori/Triumph	
7649	Pomegranate Communications; Liguori Publications	(fine art posters, calendars, museum books)
7653	Tom Doherty Associates books	Forge; Tor Books
7656	M. E. Sharpe	
7657	Jason Aronson	
7658	Transaction Publishers	
7660	Enslow Publishers	978-0-7660-XXXX-X
7661	Kessinger Publishing	a print on demand reprint publisher; also 1-4253 and 1-56456
7668	Delmar Publishers	
7670	New Video Group	(DVDs)
7673	Convention Press	
7674	Mayfield Publishing	
7678	Columbia TriStar Home Entertainment	(DVDs)
7679	Broadway Books, Morgan Road Books	now part of Random House
7680	Society of Automotive Engineers	
7692	Warner Bros. Communications	(music)
7693	Singular	
7694	Sterling Entertainment	
7695	IEEE Computer Society Press	
7700	McGraw-Hill Ryerson (Canada)	
7701	Paperjacks (Canada)	
7703	Dalhousie University; Vine Press	
7704	McClelland and Stewart	
7705	Macmillan (Canada)	
7709	Carleton University	
7710	McClelland and Stewart	
7713	University of Toronto	
7714	University of Western Ontario; Mestengo Press	
7715	Gage Publishing	
7717	McGill University	
7720	Clarke, Irwin	
7723	Macmillan-NAL (Canada)	
7725	Irwin Publishing	
7727	University of Toronto	
7729	Ontario Geological Survey	
7730	Copp Clark Publishing	
7733	American Home Treasures	a division of BFS Entertainment & Multimedia Limited
7734	Edwin Mellen Press	
7735	McGill-Queen's University Press	
7736	General Publishing (Canada)	
7737	Stoddart	now part of Fitzhenry & Whiteside
7740	Coles Notes	Toronto, ON, Canada
7743	Ontario Publications Services Section	government publisher
7744	Ontario Institute for Studies in Education	
7746	Presses de l'Université Laval	
7747	Harcourt Brace Jovanovich (Canada)	also Thompson Learning?
7748	University of British Columbia Press	
7750	Librairie Beauchemin	
7752	Actuelle	
7753	Pierre Tisseyre; Cercle du livre de France (Canada)	
7754	Québec: Éditeur officiel	government publisher
7755	Fides	
7757	Garneau	
7758	Hurtubise HMH	
7759	Éditions de l'homme	
7760	Éditions du Jour	
7761	Leméac	
7762	Lidec	
7766	University of Ottawa Press	
7770	Presses de l'Université du Québec	
7777	La Presse (Montréal)	
7778	Queen's Printer for Ontario	
7783	MIRA Books	
7786	Madacy Entertainment	
7798	Thomson Carswell	
7800	Home Vision Entertainment/Janus Films	
7803	Institute of Electrical and Electronics Engineers (IEEE)	
7806	Warner Home Video; PBS Home Video	(DVDs)
7808	Omnigraphics	
7814	David C. Cook	
7817	Raven Press	
7818	Hippocrene Books	
7821	Sybex	now part of Wiley
7823	Educational Media Film & Video	(DVDs)
7829	Resources for Christian Living	
7831	HBO	
7832	Universal Studios Home Entertainment	(DVDs)
7835	Time-Life Books	
7838	G. K. Hall	
7840	Artisan Home Entertainment	
7844	American Society of Civil Engineers	Includes ASCE Press
7847	Standard Publishing Company	
7851	Marvel Comics	New York
7852	Thomas Nelson Publishers	
7858	Castle Books	Edison, New Jersey
7862	Thorndike Press	
7863	Irwin Professional	
7864	McFarland & Company	Jefferson, North Carolina, US
7867	Carroll & Graf Publishers; Da Capo Press	
7868	Hyperion	
7869	Wizards of the Coast	formerly TSR, Inc. (aka TSR Hobbies, aka Tactical Studies Rules) also assigned other ISBN 0- and 1- publisher codes
7872	Kendall/Hunt Publishing	
7873	Mokelumme Press	
7876	Gale Research	
7879	Jossey-Bass Publishers	now part of Wiley
7880	Academic Renewal Press	
7881	National Defence University Press	
7884	Heritage Books	
7885	Scholars Press	
7886	MPI Media Group	
7887	Recorded Books	
7888	Buena Vista Home Entertainment	
7890	Haworth Medical Press	New York
7892	Abbeville Press	
7893	Universe	
7894	Dorling Kindersley	
7895	Thomson Learning	
7897	Que Publishing	now part of Pearson Education
7900	Reed Publishing (New Zealand)	now named Raupo Publishing; part of the Penguin Group
7901	Shortland Publications	
7906	Prompt Publications	
7907	Warner Home Video	(DVDs)
7910	Chelsea House Publishers	now part of Infobase Publishing
7913	Thomson Reuters	Valhalla, NY, US
7914	State University of New York Press	
7918	ASME Press (American Society of Mechanical Engineers)	
7921	Paramount Home Video	(DVDs)
7922	National Geographic Society	
7923	Kluwer Academic Publishers	now part of Springer
7928	MGM/UA Home Video	(DVDs)
7931	Dearborn Trade	
7935	G. Schirmer	including Associated Music Publishers; Hal Leonard Corporation
7936	PBS Home Video	(DVDs)
7942	Thirteen	(DVDs)
7944	Reader's Digest	
7957	Kwela Books	(South Africa)
7962	Heinemann (South Africa)	
7969	Human Sciences Research Council (South Africa)	
7970	The Government Printer (South Africa)	
7972	University of Stellenbosch	
7974	various Zimbabwe imprints	
7978	Government of Swaziland	
7979	B. Britten (Swaziland)	
7981	Human & Rousseau (South Africa)	
7983	Africa Institute of South Africa	
7989	Pretoria State Library	
7992	University of Cape Town	
7994	Via Afrika	
8001	Columbia TriStar Home Video	(NTSC video)
8002	Falmer Press	
8005	Bogden & Quigley	
8006	Fortress Press	
8007	Fleming H. Revell; Chosen Books	divisions of Baker Publishing Group
8008	Taplinger Publishing	
8010	Baker Book House	a division of Baker Publishing Group
8013	Longman (US division)	now part of Pearson Education
8014	Cornell University Press	
8015	Hawthorn Books	
8016	C. V. Mosby	now part of Elsevier
8018	Johns Hopkins University Press	
8019	Chilton Book Co.	
8020	University of Toronto Press	
8021	Grove Press	
8022	Philosophical Library	
8023	Dufour Editions	
8024	Moody Publishers	Additional imprint: Northfield Publishing
8026	George Mason University Press	
8027	Walker and Company	
8028	W. B. Eerdmans	
8031	ASTM (American Society for Testing and Materials)	
8032	University of Nebraska Press	
8034	Avalon Books	an imprint of Thomas Bouregy & Co., Inc.
8036	F. A. Davis Company	
8037	Dial Press	
8038	Focal Press (US division)	now part of Elsevier
8039	SAGE Publications	
8040	Swallow Press	now part of Ohio University Press
8041	Random House Large Print	
8042	John Knox Press	
8044	F. Ungar	
8046	Kennikat Press	
8047	Stanford University Press	
8048	Charles E. Tuttle Company	
8050	Henry Holt and Company also Metropolitan Books	now part of Georg von Holtzbrinck Publishing Group
8052	Schocken Books	
8053	Benjamin Cummings	now part of Pearson Education
8054	Broadman Press; Broadman & Holman	now known as Holman Bible Publishers
8055	Hart Publishing	
8057	Twayne Publishers	later a division of G. K. Hall
8058	Lawrence Erlbaum Associates, also Routledge	now part of Taylor and Francis
8059	Dorrance Publishing	
8061	University of Oklahoma Press	
8062	Carlton Press	
8063	Genealogical Publishing	
8065	Citadel Press	now part of Kensington Books
8066	Augsburg Publishing House	now part of Augsburg Fortress
8067	Urban & Schwarzenberg	
8069	Sterling Publishing	
8070	Beacon Press	
8071	Louisiana State University Press	
8072	Random House	
8074	Union of American Hebrew Congregations	
8075	Albert Whitman & Company	Niles, IL, USA
8076	George Braziller	
8077	Teacher's College Press	
8078	University of North Carolina Press	
8080	CCH Inc. (Commerce Clearing House Inc.)	now part of Wolters Kluwer
8084	College & University Press	
8087	Burgess Publishing	
8089	Grune & Stratton	
8090	Hill and Wang	
8091	Paulist Press	
8092	Contemporary Books	
8093	Southern Illinois University Press	
8094	Time-Life Books	
8095	Borgo Press	
8096	Association Press	
8098	Tuttle Publishing	
8101	Northwestern University Press	
8102	Chandler Publishing	
8103	Gale Research	
8104	Hayden Books	
8106	National Education Association	
8108	Scarecrow Press	now part of Rowman & Littlefield
8109	Harry N. Abrams	
8110	Northwestern University Press	Evanston, IL, US
8112	New Directions Publishing	
8114	Raintree Steck-Vaughn	
8115	Kraus Reprint	
8116	Garrard	
8117	Stackpole Books	
8118	Chronicle Books	
8120	Barron's Educational Series	
8121	Lea and Febiger	
8122	University of Pennsylvania Press	
8125	Tom Doherty Associates; Tor Books	
8126	Open Court Publishing	
8128	Stein and Day Publishers	
8129	Quadrangle Books	later Times Books, now Random House
8130	University of Florida Press	now University Press of Florida
8131	University Press of Kentucky	
8132	Catholic University of America Press	
8133	Westview Press	
8134	Interstate Printers & Publishers	
8135	Rutgers University Press	
8137	Geological Society of America	
8138	Iowa State University Press	
8139	University Press of Virginia	
8141	National Council of Teachers of English	
8142	Ohio State University Press	
8143	Wayne State University Press	Detroit, Michigan, US
8144	AMACOM (American Management Association)	
8146	Liturgical Press	
8147	New York University Press	
8149	Vanguard Press	
8150	Wittenborn	
8151	Year Book Medical Publishers	now part of Elsevier
8152	Apollo Editions	
8153	Garland Publishing	now part of Taylor and Francis
8154	Cooper Square Press	
8155	Noyes Data Corporation	
8156	Syracuse University Press	
8157	Brookings Institution Press	
8160	Facts on File	now part of Infobase Publishing
8161	G. K. Hall	
8162	Holden-Day	
8164	Seabury Press	
8165	University of Arizona Press	
8166	University of Minnesota Press	
8167	Watermill Press	
8169	American Institute of Chemical Engineers	
8170	Judson Press	
8173	University of Alabama Press	Tuscaloosa AL, US
8174	Amphoto	
8176	Birkhäuser Verlag	
8179	Hoover Institution Press	
8180	Horizon Press	
8184	L. Stuart	
8185	Brooks/Cole Publishing	now part of Cengage Learning
8186	IEEE Computer Society Press	
8189	Alba House	
8190	Fides/Claretian	
8191	University Press of America	
8192	Morehouse Publishing	
8194	SPIE Optical Engineering Press	
8195	Wesleyan University Press	
8196	Biblo and Tannen	
8197	Bloch Publishing	
8198	Pauline Books & Media	
8199	Franciscan Herald Press	
8201	Scholars' Facsimiles & Reprints	
8203	University of Georgia Press	
8204	P. Lang	
8205	LexisNexis	
8206	Chemical Publishing	
8207	Duquesne University Press	
8211	McCutchan Publishing	
8212	New York Graphic Society, Bulfinch Press	New York
8213	World Bank	
8214	Ohio University Press	
8216	Carol Communications	
8218	American Mathematical Society	
8220	Cliffs Notes	now part of Wiley
8221	Dickenson Publishing	
8222	Dramatists Play Service	
8223	Duke University Press	
8224	Fearon Publishers	
8225	Lerner Publications	
8226	Littlefield, Adams	
8229	University of Pittsburgh Press	
8230	Watson-Guptill Publications, Billboard Books (also 0-8231 and 0-89820), Back Stage Books	
8231	Billboard Books	(also 0-8230 and 0-89820)
8232	Fordham University Press	
8234	Holiday House	
8236	International Universities Press	
8240	Garland Publishing	London, UK; now part of Taylor and Francis
8242	H. W. Wilson Company	
8243	Annual Reviews Inc.	
8245	Crossroad Publishing	Herder & Herder
8246	Jonathan David Publishers	
8247	Marcel Dekker	
8248	University Press of Hawaii	
8249	Ideals Publications	Candy Cane Press
8253	Beaufort Books	
8254	Kregel Publications	
8256	Oak Publications	
8258	Carl Fischer Music	
8260	Ronald Press	
8261	Springer Publishing	
8262	University of Missouri Press	
8263	University of New Mexico Press	
8264	Continuum	
8265	Vanderbilt University Press	
8266	Kehot Publication Society	
8267	United Bible Societies	
8269	American Technical Society	
8270	Organization of American States: General Secretariat	
8272	Chalice Press	
8273	Delmar Publishers	
8276	Jewish Publication Society of America	
8278	Richard Pflaum Verlag	
8281	American Heritage Publ.	
8283	Branden Press	
8285	Mir Publishers	
8289	S. Greene Press	
8290	Irvington Publishers	
8294	Loyola University Press	
8295	Press of Case Western Reserve University	
8298	Pilgrim Press	
8299	West Publishing	now part of Thomson Reuters
8302	Goodyear Publishing	
8303	Fleet Press	
8304	Nelson-Hall	
8306	Tab Books	
8307	Regal Books	
8308	Inter-Varsity Press	
8309	Herald Publishing	
8310	Howell-North Books	
8311	Industrial Press	
8314	Science and Behavior Books	
8315	R. Speller	
8317	Mayflower Books	
8319	Oaklife Publishing	Story Concepts and (Non-)Fiction
8323	Binfords & Mort	
8329	WBusiness Books	
8330	RAND Corporation	
8335	Dell Publishing	New York, NY, USA
8337	Burt Franklin	
8341	Beacon Hill Press of Kansas City	
8342	Aspen Publishers	now part of Wolters Kluwer
8343	Funk & Wagnalls	
8348	John Weatherhill	
8351	Foreign Languages Press (China)	
8352	Bowker Publishing	
8356	Theosophical Publishing House	
8357	University Microfilms International (UMI)	
8359	Reston Publishing, Intel Corporation	
8361	Herald Press	
8362	Andrews and McMeel	Sheed and Ward
8364	South Asia Books	
8368	Gareth Stevens	
8369	Books for Libraries Press	(reprint publisher)
8371	Greenwood Press	(used for reprints)
8376	Robert Bentley	
8377	Fred B. Rothman	Littleton, Colorado, US
8379	Marquis Who's Who	
8383	Haskell House Publishers	
8384	Heinle & Heinle	
8385	Appleton & Lange	
8386	Fairleigh Dickinson University Press	
8387	Bucknell University Press	
8388	Educators Publishing Service	
8389	American Library Association	
8390	Allanheld & Schram	
8391	University Park Press	
8396	C. A. Jones Publishing	
8398	Gregg Press	
8401	H. R. Allenson	
8402	Nash Publishing	
8403	Kendall/Hunt Publishing	
8405	Presses de l'Université de Montréal	
8407	Thomas Nelson Publishers	
8408	Carrollton Press	
8410	Markham Publishing	
8412	American Chemical Society	
8414	Folcroft Library Editions	
8415	Saturday Review Press	
8419	Africana Publishing	
8420	Scholarly Resources	
8422	MSS Information Corp.	
8423	Tyndale House Publishers	
8425	Brigham Young University Press	
8428	Cambridge Book Company	
8431	Price Stern Sloan	Los Angeles, CA, USA
8434	McGrath Publishing	
8436	CBI Publishing (Cahners??) (US)	
8442	National Textbook Company	
8444	Library of Congress	
8446	Peter Smith	
8447	American Enterprise Institute for Public Policy Research	
8448	Crane, Russak	
8450	Broude Brothers	
8451	Alan R. Liss	
8453	Cornwall Books	
8456	Sadtler Research Laboratories	
8457	Yale University: Beinecke Rare Book and Manuscript Library	
8459	Williams Publishing House	
8462	Russell & Russell	
8464	Beekman Publications	
8465	Benjamin Cummings Publishing	now part of Pearson Education
8467	Paddington Press	
8476	Rowman & Littlefield	
8477	Editorial de la Universidad de Puerto Rico	
8478	A. Rizzoli	now RCS MediaGroup
8482	Norwood Editions	
8490	Gordon Press	
8492	R. West	
8493	CRC Press	
8497	Pallma Music	
8499	Word Books	WestBow Press; imprint of Thomas Nelson
8500~8999	see #5-digit_publisher_codes	

== 5-digit publisher codes ==
(Note: many codes are not yet listed in this table; please help fill the gaps.)

Publisher code	Publisher	Notes
70000~84999	see #4-digit_publisher_codes	
85000~85009	?	
85010	Haynes Publishing Group	
85025	Tor Mark Press	Redruth, UK
85033	Phillimore & Co	Chichester, UK
85036	Merlin Press	Pontypool, Wales
85039	Geographers' A-Z Map Company	
85045	Osprey Publishing	Oxford, UK; also 1-84176, also 1-84603
85052	Leo Cooper	Imprint of Heinemann Group
85054	Alan Godfrey Maps	Also 0-907554; also 1-84151; also 1-84784
85059	Patrick Stephens	Cambridge, England; also 1-85260
85100	Derbyshire Countryside Ltd	Derby, UK
85105	Dolmen Press / Colin Smythe Ltd	Gerrards Cross, Buckinghamshire, UK also 0-86140, 0-900675, 0-901072, 0-905715
85112	Guinness Publishing	Enfield, UK
85115	Boydell Press/Adam Books	Ipswich, UK
85130	Air Britain (Historians) Ltd.	Tonbridge, Kent, UK
85153	Bradford Barton	Truro, Cornwall, UK
85157	Clive Bingley	London, UK
85170	BFI Publishing	
85174	Brown, Son & Ferguson	Glasgow, Scotland
85177	Conway Maritime Press	London, UK
85195	Co-operative College	Manchester, UK
85206	Dalesman Books	Clapham, North Yorkshire, UK
85223	Ebury Press	London, UK
85244	Gracewing	
85263	Shire Publications	Princes Risborough/Oxford, UK
8528?	WordTruth Press	
85296	Institution of Electrical Engineers	Stevenage, UK
85303	Vallentine Mitchell	Edgware, Middlesex, UK; Portland, OR, US
85323	Liverpool University Press	Liverpool, UK
85329	London Transport	London, UK
85331	Lund Humphries	Aldershot, England
85334	Applied Science Publishers	
85361	Oakwood Press	Oxford/Salisbury
85364	William B. Eerdmans Publishing	Grand Rapids, Michigan, US
85368	Arms and Armour Press	
85369	Pharmaceutical Press	
85372	Pitkin Pictorials	
85404	The Royal Society of Chemistry	Cambridge, UK
85417	Scolar Press	Menston, Yorkshire
85423	Selden Society	London, England
85427	John Sherratt and Son	Altrincham, UK
85431	Society of Antiquaries of London	London, England
85490	Wildy, Simmonds and Hill Publishing	London, England
85496	Wolff	London, England
85527	Harvester Press	
85532	Search Press	
85575	Australian Institute of Aboriginal Studies	Canberra, Australia
85600	University of York	York, UK
85617	White Lion Publishers Limited	London, UK
85670	Vendome Press	New York, New York, US; also 0-86565
85683	Shepheard-Walwyn	London, UK
85685	Marshall Cavendish Books	London, UK
85696	Haynes Publishing Group	
85704	Halsgrove	Wellington, Somerset, UK
85723	Hermes House	London, UK
85724	Emerald Group Publishing	Bingley, England
85762	New Burlington Books	London, UK
85763	Nosy Crow	London, UK
85794	Silver Link Publishing	Peterborough, England
85905	Hesperian Press	Carlisle, West Australia, Australia
85924	Dove Communications	Blackburn, Victoria, Australia
85934	Bernard Babani (Publishing) Ltd	London, UK
85941	Martin Books, Simon & Schuster International Group	Cambridge, UK
85950	Stanley Thornes	Cheltenham, UK
85965	Plexus, US	
85967	Scolar Press	Menston, Yorkshire
85983	Frank Graham	6 Queen's Terrace, Newcastle upon Tyne, NE2 2PL
85985	Price Stern Sloan	Northampton, England
85991	D. S. Brewer	Cambridge
86000	Usborne Publishing Ltd.	
86001	Babylon Books	
86005	Celtic Educational Services	Swansea, UK
86020	Usborne Publishing	London, UK
86023	Barracuda Books	Buckingham, UK
8604?	Monster House Press	Cleveland/Columbus, OH & Bloomington, IN
86055	Archaeological Service, Suffolk County Council	Ipswich, England
86068	Virago Press	London, UK
86080	Wiltshire County Council	Trowbridge, Wiltshire, UK
86084	Estate Publications	Tenterden, UK
86091	Verso Books	London, UK
86093	OPC (Oxford Publishing Co.)	later part of Haynes Publishing Group; now part of Ian Allan
86095	OPC (Oxford Publishing Co.)	later part of Haynes Publishing Group; now part of Ian Allan
86101	Salamander Books	London, UK
86104	Pluto Press	London, England
86124	Bison Books	part of University of Nebraska Press
86136	Galley Press	Imprint of WHSmith
86140	Colin Smythe Limited	Gerrards Cross, Buckinghamshire, UK also 0-85105, 0-900675, 0-901072, 0-905715
86143	English Tourist Board	
86145	The Automobile Association	Basingstoke, UK
86152	Acair Ltd	Isle of Lewis, Scotland
86153	Saint Andrew Press	Edinburgh, Scotland; also 0-7152
86157	Countryside Publications	Brinscall, Lancashire, UK; Newbury, Berkshire, UK
86166	Knockabout Comics	London, UK
86178	Cathay Books	London, England; later part of Octopus Books Ltd
86196	John Libbey	New Barnet, England
86227	Grandreams	London, UK
86228	Heraldic Art Press	Arlington, VA, US
86241	Canongate	Edinburgh
86243	Y Lolfa Cyf	Talybont, Ceredigion, Wales, UK
86248	Lyle Publications	Galashiels, UK
86272	Kingfisher Books	London, UK
86273	Hennerwood Publications	London, UK
86281	Appletree Press	Belfast, UK
86299	Alan Sutton	later Sutton Publishing
86316	Writers and Readers Publishing	New York, NY, US
86318	Dorling Kindersley	London, UK
86350	Webb & Bower	Exeter, UK
86367	Telegraph Books	London, UK
86369	Virgin Books	London, UK
86516	Bolchary - Carducci Publishers	Wauconda, IL, US
86547	North Port Press	
86554	Mercer University Press	Macon, Georgia, US
86565	Vendome Press	New York, New York, US; also 0-85670
86571	New Society Publishers	Gabriola Island, BC, Canada
86597	Liberty Fund	Indianapolis, Indiana, US
86612	American Hotel & Lodging Educational Institute	Lansing, Michigan, US
86716	Saint Anthony Messenger Press	
86719	Retro Systems	
87013	Michigan State University Press	East Lansing, Michigan, US
87021	Naval Institute Press	Annapolis, Maryland, US
87029	Abbey Press	
87054	Arkham House	Sauk City, Wisconsin, US
87061	Ave Maria Press	Christian Classics
87068	Ktav Publishing	
87070	The Museum of Modern Art	New York, US
87099	Metropolitan Museum of Art	New York, US
87113	Grove/Atlantic, Inc.	New York, US
87116	National Railroad Passenger Corporation (Amtrak)	Washington DC, US
87127	Princeton Book Company	
87135	Marvel Comics	New York
87177	Sierra On-Line Inc.	Bellevue, WA. US
87192	Davis Publications	Worcester, MA, US
87249	University of South Carolina Press	
87262	American Society of Civil Engineers	Includes ASCE Press
87289	CQ Press	Washington DC, US
87290	Corning Museum of Glass	Corning, NY, US
87322	Human Kinetics	Champaign, Illinois, US/ Leeds, England, UK
87337	Nolo Press	Berkeley, California, US
87338	The Kent State University Press	Kent, OH, US
87348	Pathfinder Press	New York, US (also 0-913460)
87349	KP Books	
87352	The Modern Language Association of America	
87364	Paladin Press	
87398	Sword of the Lord	Murfreesboro, TN, US
87413	University of Delaware Press	UK: Associated University Presses
87414	Iowa Institute of Hydraulic Research	Iowa City, Iowa, US
87451	University Press of New England	Hanover, NH, US
87480	The University of Utah Press	Salt Lake City, UT, US
87510	The Christian Science Publishing Society	Boston, MA, US
87526	Gould Publications, Inc.	
87542	Llewellyn Worldwide	
87579	Deseret Book	Salt Lake City, Utah, US; also 1-57008 and 1-59038
87580	Northern Illinois University Press	Chicago, Illinois, US
87584	Harvard Business School Press	
87587	Los Angeles County Museum of Art	Los Angeles, California, US
87685	Black Sparrow Press	
87779	G. & C. Merriam Co.	Merriam-Webster
87793	Ave Maria Press	
87805	University Press of Mississippi	Jackson, MS, USA
87813	Christian Light Publications	
87830	Theatre Arts Books	
87833	Taylor Publishing Company	Dallas, Texas, US
87840	Georgetown University Press	
87842	Mountain Press Publishing Co.	Missoula, Montana, US
87857	Rodale Press	Emmaus, Pennsylvania, US
87893	Sinauer Associates	biology, psychology, neuroscience textbooks
87910	Limelight Editions	New York, NY, US
87930	Backbeat Books	imprint of CMP Information
87938	Motorbooks International	Minnesota, MN, US
87946	ACTA Publications; Jade-Milan Records	Jade Music; Milan Records
87951	9 Overlook Press	
87973	Our Sunday Visitor	
87975	Prometheus Books	New York, New York, US
87985	Eastman Kodak Company	
88022	Que Corporation	Carmel, Indiana, US
88029	Dorset Press	New York
88038	Wizards of the Coast	formerly TSR, Inc. (aka TSR Hobbies, aka Tactical Studies Rules) also assigned other ISBN 0- and 1- publisher codes
88103	Aladdin Books	New York, NY, USA
88125	Ktav Publishing House	Hoboken, New Jersey, US
88138	Simon & Schuster	Hoboken, New Jersey, US
88145	Broadway Play Publishing Inc	New York, New York, US
88146	Mercer University Press	Macon, Georgia, US
88163	Analytic	
88175	Computer Science Press	Rockville, MD, US
88176	Publications International	Lincolnwood, IL, US
88266	Storey Books/Storey Communications	
88271	Regina Press	
88286	University of Michigan Press	Ann Arbour, Michigan, US
88289	Pelican Publishing Company	Gretna, LA, US
88295	Harlan Davidson Inc	Wheeling, IL, US
88344	Orbis Books	
88373	Stonehill	New York
88385	Mathematical Association of America	Washington DC, US
88489	St. Mary's Press	
88706	State University of New York Press	Albany, New York, US
88727	Cheng & Tsui Company	Boston, Massachusetts, US
88738	Transaction Publishers	
88740	Schiffer Publishing	
88754	Playwrights Canada Press	mostly plays and criticism
88784	Anansi	Toronto
88910	Coach House Press	Toronto
88850	Reader's Digest Association	
88922	Talon Books Ltd.	Vancouver, BC, Canada
88937	Hogrefe & Huber Publishers	Seattle, Washington, US
88946	Edwin Mellen Press	
88997	Canadian Conference of Catholic Bishops	Ottawa, ON, Canada
89024	Kalmbach Media (formerly Kalmbach Publishing Company, until 2018)	Waukesha, Wisconsin, US
89029	Morningside House	Dayton, OH, USA
89093	University Publications of America	Frederick, Maryland, US
89107	Crossway Books	
89141	Presidio Press	Novato, CA, US
89204	Sporting News Books	St. Louis, MO, US
89221	New Leaf Press	
89234	National Journal Group	Washington DC, US
89236	J. Paul Getty Museum	Los Angeles, CA, US - now to 1-60606
89243	Liguori Publications	
89272	Down East Books	Camden, Maine, US
89281	Inner Traditions Lindisfarne Press	West Stockbridge, MA, US
89283	Servant Books (Now part of Franciscan Media), S.O.S. Free Stock	
89341	Longwood	
89347	Mindful Press	Ted Nelson
89385	Sherwood Sugden & Co	Peru, Illinois
89390	Resource Publications	
89434	Ferguson Publishing Company	Chicago, IL, USA
89479	A&W Publishers	
89486	Hazelden Foundation	
89490	Enslow Publishers, Inc.	
89526	Regnery Publishing	Formerly Regnery Gateway
89555	TAN Books and Publishers	Montfort Publications
89603	Humana Press	Totowa
89622	Twenty-Third Publications	
89721	Ortho Books	San Francisco, California, US
89747	Squadron/Signal Publications	Carrollton, Texas, US
89791	Association for Computing Machinery	New York
89815	Ten Speed Press	Berkeley, CA, US
89818	Center for Civic Education	Calabasas, California, US
89820	Biboard Books	also 0-8230 and 0-8231
89839	Battery Press	Nashville, Tennessee, US
89870	Ignatius Press	
89871	Society for Industrial and Applied Mathematics	Philadelphia, Pennsylvania, US
89906	Mesorah Publications	Brooklyn
89930	Quorum Books	Westport, Connecticut, US; now part of Greenwood Publishing Group
89942	Catholic Book Publishing	
89997	Wilderness Press	Berkeley, California, US
89998~89999	?	

== 6-digit publisher codes ==
(Note: many codes are not yet listed in this table; please help fill the gaps.)

Publisher code	Publisher	Notes
900000~900161	?	
900162	Bernards (Publishers) Ltd	London, UK
900197	Bristol and Gloucestershire Archaeological Society	
900214	British Postmark Society	
900265	British Cave Research Association	
900322	Chelsea Green Publishing	White River Junction, Vermont, US
900323~900370	?	
900371	see #7-digit_publisher_codes	
900372~900381	?	
900382	Franey & Co Ltd	London, UK
900384	Freedom Press	
900389	Gallery Press	Neston, Cheshire, UK
900404	Goose & Son Publishers	Folkestone, Kent
900409	Frank Graham	Newcastle upon Tyne, UK
900609	Quail Map Company	
900627	Roundhouse Books	Hatch End, Middlesex
900675	Colin Smythe Limited	Gerrards Cross, Buckinghamshire, UK also 0-85105, 0-86140, 0-901072, 0-905715,
900771	University of Exeter	
901072	Colin Smythe Limited	Gerrards Cross, Buckinghamshire, UK also 0-85105, 0-86140, 0-900675, 0-905715
901096	Industrial Railway Society	
901115	Railway Correspondence and Travel Society	
901144	Health Protection Agency	Didcot, England
901272	Centre for North-West Regional Studies, University of Lancaster	Lancaster, UK
901283	Railway Development Society	Great Bookham, UK
901333	Wiltshire Record Society	Chippenham, England
901347	North West Civic Trust	Swinton, UK
901428	Peak Park Joint Planning Board	
901673	Manchester City Galleries	Manchester, UK
901793	Yorkshire Evening Press	York, UK
901800	Centre for North-West Regional Studies, University of Lancaster	Lancaster, UK
901824	James Thin and Mercat Press	Edinburgh, Scotland
901878	Society of Genealogists	London, England
901906	Industrial Railway Society	
902087	London Topographical Society	
902129	Dorset Publishing	
902205	Cambridge University Library	Cambridge, UK
902228	Lancashire County Council	Preston, UK
902358	Radar Promotions	London, UK
902363	Cicerone Press	Milnthorpe, UK
902660	Federation of Old Cornwall Societies	Cornwall
902751	Nottinghamshire County Council	West Bridgford, UK
902756	Esperanto-Asocio de Britio	
902793	Book Rivers Museum	
902835	Historical Model Railway Society	Frome
902888	OPC (Oxford Publishing Co.)	
902920	Abson Books	Abson, UK
902956	Great Western Society	Didcot, UK
903102	Dance Books	
903141	Granta Publications	London, UK
903319	Calouste Gulbenkian Foundation	London, UK
903479	D.W. Willoughby and E.R. Oakley	Kent
903505	PBI Publications/Expert Books	Waltham Cross, UK
903598	National Gallery of Scotland	
903623	Potato Marketing Board	London, UK
903652	Health Education Authority	UK
903686	Institute of Cornish Studies	Redruth
903903	Society of Antiquaries of Scotland	Edinburgh, Scotland
904002	Richard Drew Publishing	Glasgow, UK
904069	Ash and Grant	London, England
904093	Lloyd's of London Press Ltd.	London, England
904296	Public Libraries Department, County Borough of Blackburn	Blackburn, England
904335	Central Lancashire Development Corporation	Cuerden, UK
904579	The Housman Society	Bromsgrove, UK
904711	Capital Transport Publishing	Harrow, Middlesex
905205	Francis Cairrns Publications	Leeds, UK
905235	Leigh Local History Society	Leigh, Greater Manchester, UK
905243	Glamorgan Archive Service	
905280	Southampton University Industrial Archeology Group	Southampton, England
905435	DP Publications	London, UK
905455	Yorkshire Dales National Park Committee	Grassington, UK
905466	Avon-Anglia	Weston-super-Mare/Bristol, UK
905521	Exley Publications	Watford, UK
905522	Robert Nicholson Publications	London, UK
905555	National Maritime Museum	Greenwich, England
905617	The World Ship Society	Kendal, England
905715	Van Duren Publishers / Colin Smythe Ltd	Gerrards Cross, Buckinghamshire, UK also 0-85105, 0-86140, 0-900675, 0-901072
905777	G W & A Hesketh	Ormskirk, England
906025	Peter Watts Publishing	Gloucester
906047	Croydon Natural History & Scientific Society Ltd.	Croydon, UK
906138	Scepter Publishers	
906198	J. Salmon	Sevenoaks, UK
906154	BPI Ltd. British Phonographic Industry	London, England
906169	Glasgow City Libraries and Archives	
906294	Twelveheads Press	Truro, England
906337	Leisure Studies Association (LSA)	Eastbourne, UK
906375	Diesel & Electric Group	
906395	Hart & Allen	London
906454	Monkswood Press	Loughton, UK
906506	Cameron & Hollis	Moffat, UK
906520	Middleton Press	Midhurst, West Sussex
906579	Platform 5 Publishing Ltd	Sheffield
906591	Signal Press	Malahide, Co Dublin
906710	Ravette Limited	Horsham, UK
906782	Granta Editions	Cambridge, England
906867	Wild Swan Publishing	
906881	Helmshore Local History Society	Helmshore, UK
906883	Rail Photoprints	Temple Cloud, Bristol
906899	Atlantic Transport Publishers	
906976	Doncaster Books	An imprint of Wheaton Publishers Ltd
906988	Southern Electric Group	
907064	Cornish Language Board (Kesva an Taves Kernewek)	Sutton Coldfield
907115	David & Charles, Plc.	Devon
907328	National Library of Ireland	Dublin, Ireland
907347	Transport 2000	London, UK
907503	Campden BRI	Chipping Campden, England
907511	Neil Richardson	Stoneclough, UK
907554	Alan Godfrey Maps	Also 0-85054; also 1-84151; also 1-84784
907566	Dyllansow Truran	Redruth
907586	Tressell Publications	Brighton, UK
907610	Titan Books	London, UK
907660	Douglas Hyde Gallery	Dublin, Ireland
907651	House of Lochar	Colonay
907689	Toccata Press	London
907764	Society for the Promotion of Roman Studies	London, England
907768	Countyvise	Birkenhead, UK
907771	Maritime Books	Liskeard, England
907864	Wayzgoose	Tatenhill, UK
908031	Turton & Armstrong Pty.	Wahroonga, New South Wales, Australia
909969	Cycleserv Publications	Sydney, Australia
911051	Plain View Press	Austin, Texas, US
911104	Workman Publishing	also 0-7611
911137	Imagine	Pittsburgh, Pennsylvania, US
911291	Los Angeles County Museum of Art	Los Angeles, California, US
911682	Advent Publishers	Chicago, Illinois, US
911747	Broadway Press	Louisville, Kentucky, US
912861	American Society of Plant Taxonomists	
913460	Pathfinder Press	New York, New York, US (also 0-87348)
913589	Williamson Publishing	Charlotte, Vermont, US
913720	Frederic C. Beil	Savannah, Georgia, US
914071	Veneficia Publications	Dorset & Isle of Wight, UK
914512	YIVO Institute for Jewish Research	New York, New York, US
914646	Bélier Press	New York, New York, US
914676	Simon & Schuster	
915144	Hackett Publishing Company	Indianapolis, Indiana, US
915388	ACTA Publications	
915552	Association for Consumer Research	Duluth, Minnesota, US
916397	Manic D Press	
916856	Alcoholics Anonymous World Services, Inc.	
917048	Washington State Historical Society	Chicago, Illinois, US
917124	Industrial Workers of the World	Chicago, Illinois, US
917510	Bell Springs Publishing	Laytonville, California, US
918344	Costello Publishing Company	
918400	Croom Helm	London, England
919415	Proclaim Publications	
919783	Boston Mills Press	Erin, Ontario, Canada
919957	HMS Press (London)	
921191	H. Cuff	St. John's, Newfoundland, Canada
922915	Feral House	Venice
923891	Ishi Press	
927609	Atomic Fez Publishing	Burnaby, British Columbia, Canada
929270	Motorola	
929279	VIZ Comics	
930289	DC Comics	New York, US
930313	McBride/Publisher	Hartford, Connecticut, US
930358	The Spoon River Press	Peoria, Illinois, US
930467	Liturgy Training Publications	
931194	Blue Sky	
931340	Amadeus Press	Portland
932085	Word Among Us Press	
932323	Red Letter Press	
932412	Mayapple Press	Woodstock, New York, US
932416	McSweeney's	San Francisco, California, US
932592	Klutz Press	Palo Alto, California, US
932766	Institute for Creation Research	El Cajon, California, US
932813	Adventures Unlimited Press	
933932	Scepter Publishers	
934244	VIZ Pictures	
934710	Joseph Simon Pangloss Press	
934781	McSweeney's	San Francisco, California, US
935166	Storm King Press	Washington D.C., US
935696	Wizards of the Coast	formerly TSR, Inc. (aka TSR Hobbies, aka Tactical Studies Rules) also assigned other ISBN 0- and 1- publisher codes
935697	Midwest Villages & Voices Publications	Minneapolis, Minnesota, US
935971	Amber Book Company	
936071	Gryphon Press	
936365	McSweeney's	San Francisco, California, US
936534	University of Michigan	
937339	South Mountain Press	Carlisle, PA, USA
937381	Brewers Publications	Boulder, CO, US
937548	Plexus Publishing, Inc.	Medford, New Jersey, US
937860	Simon & Schuster	
938289	Da Capo Press	Annapolis, Maryland, Maryland, US
938578	The Helicon Company	Lexington, KY, USA
938731	Laramidia Press	Vancouver, Washington, US
939516	Forest of Peace Publishing (an imprint of Ave Maria Press)	
939950	Mineralogical Society of America	Chantilly, Virginia, US
940112	Gingerbread House	
940669	Dramaline Publications	Rancho Mirage, California, US
940866	University of Scranton Press	Scranton, Pennsylvania, US
941423	Four Walls Eight Windows	New York, NY, USA
941478	Paraclete Press	Brewster, Massachusetts, US
941952	Walthers	Milwaukee, Wisconsin, US
942364	Hesperian Health Guides	Berkeley, California, US
942597	White Mane Publishing	Shippensburg, Pennsylvania, US
943111	Green Dolphin Press	
943432	Slack Incorporated	
944203	Marian Press	
945397	Epicenter Press	Seattle, Washington, US
946133	Lakeland Publishing Company	Preston, England
946148	Poppyland Publishing	North Walsham, UK
946184	Kingfisher Railway Publications	Southampton, England
946219	Key Publishing	Stamford, UK
946289	Mr Pye Books	Goole, England
946351	John Ritchie Ltd	Kilmarnock, Scotland
946361	Willow Publishing	Timperley, UK
946378	TCL Publications	Uckfield, England
946537	David St John Thomas also Atlantic Transport Publishing	distributed by David & Charles
946719	Firefly Publishing	SAF Publishing Ltd.
947008	Reader's Digest Association South Africa	Cape Town, South Africa
947336	Aussie Books	Archfield, Queensland, Australia
947352	Hill House Pub	London, England
947543	International Federation of Anti-Leprosy Associations	London, England
947699	Connor & Butler Specialist Publishers	Colchester, England
947757	Atlas Press	London, England
947796	Milepost Publications	Worksop, UK
947882	Belair Publications	Twickenham, UK
947971	Silver Link Publishing	
948135	Leading Edge Press and Publishing	Hawes, UK
948170	The Bibliographical Society	UK
948251	Picton Publishing	Chippenham, UK
948265	White Tree Books/Redcliffe Press	Bristol, England
948276	Shetland Folk Society	Lerwick, Scotland
948456	Ravette Publishing	
948764	Hayloft Press	a private press
948789	Carnegie Press/Carnegie Publishing	Preston/Lancaster, UK
948904	P. E. Waters & Associates	
948946	Archive Publications	Urmston, UK
948965	Gillian Cutress & Rolf Stricker	London, UK
948975	Millstream Books	Bath
949330	Tabor Publications	Tabor College, Miranda, NSW
949331~949999	?	
950000~999999	see #7-digit_publisher_codes	

== 7-digit publisher codes ==
(Note: many codes are not yet listed in this table; please help fill the gaps.)

Publisher code	Publisher	Notes
3700000~6389999	see #3-digit_publisher_codes	
6390000~6397999	see #4-digit_publisher_codes	
6398000~6399999	?	
6400000~6449999	see #3-digit_publisher_codes	
6450000~6459999	?	
6460000~6479999	see #3-digit_publisher_codes	
6480000~6489999	?	
6490000~6549999	see #3-digit_publisher_codes	
6550000~6559999	see #4-digit_publisher_codes	
6560000~6999999	see #3-digit_publisher_codes	
8500000~8999999	see #5-digit_publisher_codes	
9000000~9003709	see #6-digit_publisher_codes	
9003710~9003719	? (assigned to Bermuda)	
9003720~9499999	see #6-digit_publisher_codes	
9500000~9500465	?	
9500466	Panel on Takeovers and Mergers	London, UK
9502376	Southern Electric Group	
9502960	Sten Valley Press	
9504226	John Gagg	Princes Risborough, UK
9507692	Landy Publishing	Staining, Lancashire, UK
9507714	P M Heaton	Pontypool, Wales
9507802	The London Brick Company	Stewartby, UK
9508448	Association for Industrial Archaeology	Ironbridge, UK
9508913	Laura Ashley Ltd.	
9509801	Brunswick Printing & Publishing Co. Ltd.	Liverpool, UK
9510835	V G Saundercock	Plymouth, England
9511642	Anne Bradley	Higher Walton, Lancashire, UK
9511777	Pageprint (Watford) Ltd.	Watford, England
9513366	Moir Crawford	Sussex, England
9517601	Food Safety Advisory Centre	London, UK
9518339	Age Concern Lancashire	Preston, UK
9518382	Arley Hall Press	Northwich, UK
9518476	Blackburn Borough Council	Blackburn, Lancashire, UK
9519345	Amadorn	Keswick, Cumbria, UK
9519713	Harold Bridges	Burrow, Lancashire, UK
9521757	Brambletye Publishing	Sussex, England
9523226	I.N.F.A.C.T. Medical	Bolton, UK
9523577	Gildersleve Publishing	Rising Bridge, Lancashire, UK
9523912	Eclat Initiatives	London, UK
9524466	K E Keenan	Waldron, E Sussex, England
9525492	Matchless Recordings and Publishing	also Copula
9525860	Jeneva Publishing	
9526187	Wyre Publishing	St Michael's on Wyre, UK
9526262	Kenwood Limited	Havant, UK
9528228	The Outstanding Map	UK
9528574	Andrew Taylor	UK, also 1-905250
9528930	Association for Industrial Archaeology	UK
9529333	Triangle Publishing	Leigh, Greater Manchester, UK
9529503	Blackburn and Darwen Schools' Football Association	Blackburn, UK
9530119	Moorfield Press	UK
9530528	BackCare (sic)	Teddington, England
9531457	Novelangle	
9531719	Jack Wilcock	UK
9531801	East Kent Maritime Trust	Ramsgate, England
9532725	Sledgehammer Engineering Press Ltd	Cowling, UK
9533047	J M Ormston	Grays, England
9534503	Stephen R. Morrin	Stockport, UK
9535974	East Linton Local History Society	East Linton, UK
9535975	Spyrys a Gernow	Redruth, Cornwall, UK
9536743	Reword Publishers	Bramhall, UK
9537098	Oxford Press	Portsmouth, England
9537484	Skipton Millennium Task Force	Skipton, UK
9539978	Scottish Trust for Archaeological Research	Edinburgh, Scotland
9540418	British Lichen Society	
9540420	British Art Journal	
9541036	Cotswold Quality (Leisure) Ltd	Blackwell, Warwickshire, UK
9541254	Old Light Press	Oxford, England
9541362	Bank of Ideas	Sheffield/London, UK
9541809	Wood Education Programme Trust	Staveley, Cumbria, UK
9542453	Theme Trades	London, England
9542946	Republican Publications	Dublin, Ireland
9544641	Leeds Guide	Leeds, UK
9545383	Wayzgoose	Tatenhill, UK
9545575	Windgather Press	Macclesfield
9547122	Soundplay Books	Bristol, England
9549042	Diverse Media	Manchester, UK
9549059	E Rose	Chorley, UK
9549404	The Good Hotel Guide Ltd	London, England
9549451	Peter Taylor Publications	Hereford, UK
9549606	Wildfire Communications	Bristol, England
9549650	Chartex Products International Ltd	Swindon, England
9549866	Trackmaps	South Wraxall, UK
9550081	Triarchy Press	Axminster, UK
9550221	Mortons of Horncastle	Horncastle, UK
9550560	Society of London Theatre	London, England
9550938	The Ruskin Foundation	Coniston, Cumbria, UK
9551753	Form	UK
9552186	Longtail	London, England
9552233	Booksellers Association	London, England
9552283	Otago Publishing	Glasgow, Scotland
9552354	Ty Mawr Publications	Holmes Chapel, England
9552868	Mortons Media Group Ltd	Horncastle, England
9552889	Community Links	London, England
9553534	Cotswold Archaeology	Cirencester, England
9553561	Merchiston Publishing	Edinburgh, Scotland
9554110	Kevin Robertson Books	also Noodle Books
9554955	Coombe Hill Pub.	New Malden, England
9555297	Four Points Ramble Association	Manchester, UK
9555481	WRTH Publications Ltd	Oxford, England
9555485	Archaeological Development Services Ltd	Dublin, Ireland
9555851	Friends of John Muir's Birthplace	Dunbar, UK
9556546	Albion Archaeology	Bedford, England
9556646	Wimbledon College of Art	Wimbledon, England
9557182	CMCS Publications (Aberystwyth University)	Aberystwyth, Wales
9557441	Martin & Craigie-Halkett	Southampton, England
9557466	Food Solutions Publishing Ltd	Goostrey, England
9557740	DVV Media Group	Sutton, England
9558224	Michael Rubenstein Pub.	London, England
9558668	Association of Archaeological Illustrators & Surveyors	Reading, England
9558916	Splendid Books	Droxford, UK
9558926	Chelsea Publishing	London, England
9559017	P3 Publications	Carlisle, UK
9559171	Little Northern Books	Golcar, UK
9560333	Incisive Media Publications	London, England
9560722	Imperator Publishing	London, England
9560978	Corella Ltd.	Poole, England
9561943	MuseumsEtc	Edinburgh, Scotland
9561965	On-Site Archaeology	York, England
9562143	Colin Bamford	Hale Barns, Altrincham, England
9562239	Institute of Advanced Motorists	London, UK
9562826	Belvoir Vale Publishing	Keyworth, Nottingham, England
9563582	Pre-Construct Archaeology (Lincoln)	Saxilby, Lincoln, England
9563730	University of St Andrews	St Andrews, Scotland
9563901	The Caravan Gallery	UK
9564842	Booksellers Association	London, England
9565000	Centaur Media	London, England
9565184	Atkinson Publications	Goosnargh, England
9565541	Showcase Database	London, England
9566049	Millstream Publications	Warwick, England
9566889	Chris Rudd	Aylsham, England
9571735	International News Safety Institute (INSI)	London, England
9578766	Moon Adventure Publications	Pearcedale, Victoria, Australia
9582692	Spinal Publications	Raumati Beach, New Zealand
9590216	National Parks Foundation of South Australia Inc; Nature Foundation	Adelaide, Australia
9595870	Semantography-Blissymbolics Publications	Sydney, Australia
9598960	Geo H. O'Donnell	Mareeba, North Queensland, Australia
9599079	Nautical Association of Australia	Caulfield South, Victoria, Australia
9610352	Garcia / American Fantasy Press	Woodstock, Illinois US
9614719	Aerobics and Fitness Association of America	Sherman Oaks, California, US
9615197	Grief Watch	
9616286	Roman, Inc.	
9617256	Northcross House	Elliston, VA, USA
9624096	Bilingual Language Materials	South San Francisco, California, US
9627613	Sarpedon	New York, New York, US
9631589	The Bloomsbury Review	Denver, Colorado, US
9637840	Write Brain Publishers	Overland Park, Kansas, US
9639763	Greenery Press	Emeryville, California, US, also 1-890159
9639795	Department of Portable Antiquities and Treasure	British Museum, London, England
9642006	Arcus Publishing	Portland, Oregon ?
9642610	Basilica Press	
9645960	Mystic Rose Books	
9647292	Windblown Media	Newbury Park, CA
9644980	Devil's Thumb Press	between 1994-97
9651972	Uversa Press	
9653429	Book Emporium Press	Rockville, Maryland, US
9655889	A Sandy Bottom Press Design	
9659228	Ascension Press	
9663533	Ambassador House	Westminster, Colorado, US (80030, P.O.Box 1153)
9667840	Eisenbrauns also Enlil Press	(also 1-57506)
9667982	The Caddis Press	Columbus, Ohio, US
9670170	Recess Records	
9670267	Farmcourt Publishing	Cincinnati, OH, USA
9676622	Steel Cage Books	division of Steel Cage Records
9687580	Loblaw Inc.	Toronto, ON, Canada
9689247	Matrix Productions	
9690516	Blissymbolics Communication International	Toronto, ON, Canada
9694763	Islamic Shia Ithna-Asheri Jamaat of Toronto	Thornhill, ON, Canada
9695104	Empty Mirror Press	Halifax, NS, Canada
9696421	Mobile Command Headquarters, Canadian Armed Forces	St. Hubert, QC, Canada
9697259	Loblaw Inc.	Toronto, ON, Canada
9703355	McSweeney's	Brooklyn, New York, US
9703751	Celtic Dragon Press	Rome, New York, US
9705392	PEEP! Press	
9710896	Food-Medication Interactions	Birchrunville, Pennsylvania
9714010	Hand Books Press	Gloucester, Massachusetts, US
9716974	Is It Gonna Hurt? Publishers	Mechanicsburg, Pennsylvania, US
9717650	Aberjona Press	Imprint of Aegis Consulting Group
9719047	McSweeney's	San Francisco, California, US; Brooklyn, New York, US
9723298	Cherry Hill Publishing	Ramona, California, US
9725898	Vince Emery Productions	San Francisco, California, US
9727047	Jeffrey Taylor	Scottsdale, Arizona, US
9727193	Super Techno Arts	North American marketing and distribution branch of APPP Company (Another Push Pin Planning Company)
9728447	Called by Joy	
9729117	Glosson Family Foundation	Charlotte, NC, USA
9729679	New American Press	
9737787	Ninjalicious	
9738649	Variant Press	Manitoba, Canada
9750965	Ballistic Publishing	Adelaide, SA, Australia
9753140	Machine Project Press	Los Angeles, California, US
9755995	Alliance Publishing Group	Elk Grove Village, Illinois, US
9760357	Relevant Media Group	
9766984	Dark Moon Press	
9767525	Alaska Geobotany Center (University of Alaska Fairbanks)	found on the Circumpolar Arctic Vegetation Map
9771611	Amber Book Company	
9776166	The Pragmatic Programmer, LLC	The Pragmatic Bookshelf; non-standard hyphenation as 4-digit publisher
9778682	Synthetic Worlds	
9778727	Mystic Productions	
9777238	BDSM Press	
9777649	KoPubCo	
9779074	The Tayler Corporation	Orem, Utah, US
9780735	Jingle Cats	Hollywood, California, US
9780937	Latex Lair Publishing	Montreal, Quebec, Canada
9780988	Waterloo Regional Pictures Entertainment, Inc.	Kitchener, Ontario, Canada
9788192	Swabhimani Publication,	Karnataka, India
9781813	Red and Black Publishers	St Petersburg, Florida, US
9782026	Crackjaw Publishing	Guelph, ON, Canada
9787392	The Pragmatic Programmer, LLC	The Pragmatic Bookshelf; non-standard hyphenation as 4-digit publisher
9788968	Ferine Books	Los Angeles, California, US
9790468	Mark Butty Publisher	
9795393	Synthetic Worlds	
9796163	Bazillion Points Books	
9798166	Kettle Mills Press	Nashville, TN, USA
980788	United States Conference of Catholic Bishops	
9811597	Atomic Fez Publishing	Burnaby, British Columbia, Canada
9814256	Rebel e Publishers	Johannesburg, South Africa
9816003	Winterlake Press	
9817924	Ringing Bell Press	Portland, Oregon, US
9818156	Fairand Books	
9820151	Two Dollar Radio	
9820781	One Too Tree Publishing	La Grange, Illinois, US
9821005	Synthetic Worlds	
9822152	VoidMaster Publishing (AKA: VacuoDominus Publishing)	Amarillo, Texas, US
9825036	CPsquare	Portland, Oregon, US
9825442	Microsoft Research	Redmond, Washington, US
9825650	Vince Emery Productions	San Francisco, California, US
9827198	Bryan Feldman	Atlanta, Georgia, US
9829767	DSRS Publishing	Orem, Utah, US
9830086	Cherry Hill Publishing	Ramona, California, US
9834112	Practical Green Press	Allen, Texas, US
9834361	Eagle FO Publishing Company	Austin, Texas, US
9834720	National Health Law Program	Washington, District of Columbia, US
9836185	Grey Gecko Press, LLC	Katy, Texas, US
9836106	Benjamin Press	Danville, KY, USA
9838229	The Film Collaborative	Los Angeles, California, US
9840313	George A. Hart Publishing	New Jersey, US
9841318	Beacon Publishing	
9841707	Christus Publishing	
9842323	Okudens House Publishing	
9842945	Anaskimin	Southwest Harbor, Maine, US
9843759	Cherry Hill Publishing	Ramona, California, US
9848638	I Street Press	Sacramento, CA
9854400	Grey Gecko Press, LLC	Katy, Texas, US
9855006	I Street Press	Sacramento, CA
9859881	Pencey X Publishing	New York, New York, US
9863285	Remember My Service	USA
9865266	Azore's Crown Publishing	Welland, ON, Canada
9866424	Atomic Fez Publishing	Burnaby, British Columbia, Canada
9867616	The People's Picture Company Inc.	Toronto, ON, Canada
9881960	I Street Press	Sacramento, CA
9882870	Cappella Books	
9887167	Thoughtcrime Press	Oregon City, OR
9889839	I Street Press	Sacramento, CA
9894698	MoonLit Press	Williams, Az
9896415	Button Poetry	Minneapolis, MN, US
9896950	Short Flight/Long Drive Books (A division of Hobart)	Ann Arbor, Michigan
9898209	I Street Press	Sacramento, CA
9905479	Pied Piper, Inc.	
9911051	I Street Press	Sacramento, CA
9911628	Berryhill Publishing	Nesbit, MS, US
9913062	I Street Press	Sacramento, CA
9917066	Lise Heroux	Carleton Place, ON, Canada
9917419	Ammonite Films Publishing	Vancouver, BC, Canada
9927238	The Onslaught Press	Oxford, UK (series completed 2015, followed by 0-9934217, 0-9956225, 1-912111)
9931948	RISC OS Open Limited	Worthing, England
9934217	The Onslaught Press	Oxford, UK (preceded by 0-9927238; series completed 2016, followed by 0-9956225, 1-912111)
9956225	The Onslaught Press	Oxford, UK (preceded by 0-9927238, 0-9934217; series completed 2016, followed by 1-912111)
9957790	Judith Vanderman Ltd	Abercynon, UK
9973160	Code Energy LLC	Las Vegas, NV, US
9990698	MindStir Media	
9992014	Kanika African Sculptures (KAS)	
9995121	MindStir Media	
9958997	Better Dwelling	Vancouver, Canada
9958998~9999999	?	

== See also ==
- List of group-1 ISBN publisher codes
- List of ISBN identifier groups
