= Nathalia Wright =

American literary scholar (1913-2004)

President of the Melville Society
- In office 1956–1957
- In office 1972–1973

President of the South Atlantic Modern Language Association
- In office 1978–1979

Personal details
- Born: March 29, 1913 Athens, Georgia, U.S.
- Died: November 22, 2004 (aged 91) Maryville, Tennessee, U.S.
- Occupation: Literary scholar
- Awards: Guggenheim Fellowship (1953)

Academic background
- Education: Maryville College; Yale University
- Thesis: Melville's Use of the Bible (1949)

Academic work
- Discipline: American literature
- Institutions: University of Tennessee

Nathalia Wright (March 29, 1913 – November 22, 2004) was an American scholar of American literature. A 1953 Guggenheim Fellow, her work included Melville's Use of the Bible (1949), Horatio Greenough: The First American Sculptor (1963), American Novelists in Italy (1965), Questionnaire for the Investigation of American Regional English (1972), and A Word Geography of England (1974) - the last two of which she co-authored with Harold Orton - as well as the edited volumes The Complete Works of Washington Irving: Journals and Notebooks, Volume I, 1803-1806 (1969), Letters of Horatio Greenough: American Sculptor (1972), and The Correspondence of Washington Allston (1993). She was a full professor at the University of Tennessee, as well as president of the Melville Society (1956-1957; 1972-1973) and of the South Atlantic Modern Language Association (1978-1979).

== Biography ==
Nathalia Wright was born on March 29, 1913, in Athens, Georgia. She was the only child of Elizabeth (née MacNeal) and Hilliard Carlisle Wright, the latter of whom ran a store in Maryville, Tennessee. After going to Maryville High School, she obtained a BA with honors from Maryville College in 1933. She then attended Yale University, where she obtained an MA in 1938 and PhD in 1949; her doctoral dissertation was titled Melville's Use of the Bible. She also published a poetry volume through Hawthorne House, The Inner Room, in 1938.

After working at her alma mater Maryville as a librarian and instructor in the 1930s and 1940s (sources conflict on the exact years), Wright joined the University of Tennessee as an assistant professor in 1949. She was promoted to associate professor in 1955 and full professor in 1962. A faculty member of the Department of English, she was also associate director of graduate studies from 1970 to 1976. In 1972, she became the first woman named as UT's Macebearer. She was a 1975 UT Alumni Distinguished Service Professor and won the Notable UT Woman Award in 2000. She retired from UT in 1982.

Wright specialized in American literature, with The Daily Times calling her "one of the foremost scholars on the works of Herman Melville". She published several books and edited volumes, including Melville's Use of the Bible (1949), Horatio Greenough: The First American Sculptor (1963), American Novelists in Italy (1965), The Complete Works of Washington Irving: Journals and Notebooks, Volume I, 1803-1806 (1969), Letters of Horatio Greenough: American Sculptor (1972), Questionnaire for the Investigation of American Regional English (1972), A Word Geography of England (1974), and The Correspondence of Washington Allston (1993). She also edited four Scholars' Facsimiles & Reprints editions, two of which were Greenough works, as well as editions of Mary Noailles Murfree's In the Tennessee Mountains and Herman Melville's Mardi. She was an editorial board member of Publications of the Modern Language Association from 1970 to 1975.

In 1953, Wright was awarded a Guggenheim Fellowship to do research on sculptor Horatio Greenough. She was president of the Melville Society from 1956 to 1957 and 1972 to 1973, as well as of the South Atlantic Modern Language Association from 1978 until 1979 and the Modern Language Association's American Literature section in 1977. She was a member of the American Council of Learned Societies board of directors. She was also a 1959-1960 American Association of University Women fellow.

Wright was a resident of Maryville for more than six decades, and she was also part of the local St. Andrew's Episcopal Church.

Wright died on November 22, 2004, at Blount Transitional Care Center in Maryville, following years of declining health. She was aged 91. The John C. Hodges Library has a plaque dedicated to her in one of the faculty study rooms.

== Bibliography ==
- Melville's Use of the Bible (1949)
- Horatio Greenough: The First American Sculptor (1963)
- American Novelists in Italy (1965)
- (ed.) The Complete Works of Washington Irving: Journals and Notebooks, Volume I, 1803-1806 (1969)
- (ed., by Mary Noailles Murfree) In the Tennessee Mountains (1970)
- (ed.) Letters of Horatio Greenough: American Sculptor (1972)
- (with Harold Orton) Questionnaire for the Investigation of American Regional English (1972)
- (with Harold Orton) A Word Geography of England (1974)
- (ed., by Herman Melville) Mardi and a Voyage Thither (1990)
- (ed.) The Correspondence of Washington Allston (1993)

=== Scholars' Facsimiles & Reprints editions ===
- (ed., by Horatio Greenough) The Travels, Observations, and Experience of a Yankee Stonecutter (1958)
- (ed., by John Galt) The Life of Benjamin West (1959)
- (ed., by Washington Allston) Lectures on Art and Poems and Monaldi (1967)
- (ed., by Greenough) The Miscellaneous Writings of Horatio Greenough (1975)
