= Sue Chandler =

British mathematics teacher and writer

== F S Chandler (1940-2023) ==
F S Chandler, aka Suzanne or Sue Chandler, was a British schoolteacher and textbook writer, who, together with Linda Bostock, wrote the "Bostock and Chandler" series of textbooks for advanced level mathematics in the UK. At the time she began the series, she was a full-time mathematics teacher at Southgate Technical College, London. She eventually stopped teaching courses and focused on textbook writing. Her books have sold more than 6 million copies.

== Life ==
Sue Chandler became the author of Mathematics textbooks when such books were the exclusive realm of men; the books became staples of Mathematics teaching throughout the world. Sue and her colleague Linda Bostock, when teaching at Southgate Technical College in the 1970s, could find no suitable textbook to supply their needs, so they decided to write their own. Judiciously, they chose to write under the names of L Bostock and F S Chandler. In 1984, they were not surprised when Lord Rothschild, having named one of their books as his Desert Island choice, described it as having been written by 'two wonderful young men’.

Sue was the daughter of Francis Rourke, a quantity surveyor, and Paula Ley, a key member of her brother Stanley's West End tailoring business. Paula and her sister had married brothers, both of whom left their young families. The sisters were helped considerably by their five brothers.

Paula found a flat overlooking Hampstead Heath and Sue went to school at the local convent. Despite failing the 11-plus, she achieved good A-level results and gained a Maths degree at Sir John Cass College, followed by a PGCE.

Six months after meeting him, Sue married Derek Chandler, an engineer who became a patent agent. They formed a successful partnership, despite their opposing political views, and are remembered by their nephews and nieces for their generosity and moral support.

Apart from the time spent in the north of England whilst Francis was recuperating from injuries acquired at Dunkirk, Sue lived her whole life in London. Sue enjoyed entertaining family and friends. After her mother’s death, she sought out her half-brother Michael and arranged for him to meet up with her part of the Rourke family. She also took on her mother’s role of keeping the Ley family together and was instrumental in organising regular ‘cousins events’. The last of these was held in September of 2023. Knowing herself to be too frail to travel, Sue insisted on hosting this event at her home: she died as the guests arrived.

Sue was survived by her brother Colin; two daughters; three grandchildren and many cousins. Derek died in 2018, Michael in 2022 and Linda in 2012.

== Selected publications ==
Textbooks

- L Bostock & F S Chandler (1975), Applied Mathematics, Vol. 1, Stanley Thornes
- L Bostock & F S Chandler (1976), Applied Mathematics, Vol. 2, Stanley Thornes
- L Bostock & F S Chandler (1978), Pure Mathematics, Vol. 1, Stanley Thornes
- L Bostock & F S Chandler (1979), Pure Mathematics, Vol. 2, Stanley Thornes
- L Bostock & F S Chandler (1981), Mathematics – The Core Course for A Level (2nd ed.), Stanley Thornes
- L Bostock, F S Chandler & C P Rourke (1982), Further Pure Mathematics, Stanley Thornes
- L Bostock & F S Chandler (1984), Mathematics – Mechanics and Probability, Stanley Thornes
- L Bostock & F S Chandler (1985), Further Mechanics and Probability, Stanley Thornes
- L Bostock & F S Chandler (1994), Core Maths for 'A' Level (2nd ed.), Nelson Thornes
- L Bostock & F S Chandler (2000), Core Maths for 'A' Level (3rd ed.), Nelson Thornes

Other

- Chandler, Sue (1997), "A-level mathematics examinations as a fair assessment of the needs of students post-GCSE intermediate and higher tiers", Teaching Mathematics and Its Applications, 16 (4): 157–159, doi:10.1093/teamat/16.4.157.
