= Harry Reid (journalist) =

Scottish journalist and author

Harry Reid (born Glasgow 1947) is a Scottish journalist and author, best known for having been the editor of The Herald newspaper in Scotland. His first book, Dear Country: A Quest for England, was published in 1991.

He was educated at Aberdeen Grammar School, Fettes College and Worcester College, Oxford, where he read modern history. On leaving Oxford in 1969 he went to Newcastle upon Tyne, where he trained as a journalist. He then worked on The Scotsman in Edinburgh from 1970 till 1981. In 1973 he was the paper's first full-time education correspondent and in 1977 he became The Scotsman's features and literary editor. In 1981 he moved to Glasgow to be sports and leisure editor on the short-lived Sunday Standard. In 1982 he switched to The Herald as an executive editor. He was appointed deputy editor in 1984. In 1997 he was appointed editor, a position he held through 2000. From 1999 to 2001 he chaired the Scottish Editors' Committee. In 2001 he received the Lord Provost of Glasgow's Medal "for giving Glasgow a Voice".

In 2001 he was commissioned to write a major "outsider's critique" of Scotland's national church, the Church of Scotland. To help with the research he was given a visiting fellowship by the Faculty of Divinity, New College, Edinburgh. The resultant book, Outside Verdict: An Old Church in the New Scotland was published by Saint Andrew Press

Other books include: Dear Country: A Quest for England (Mainstream Publishing, 1991); The Final Whistle: Scottish Football - The Best and Worst of Times (Birlinn Limited, 2005); Deadline: The Story of the Scottish Press (Saint Andrew Press in association with the BBC, 2006) and Reformation: The Dangerous Birth of the Modern World (Saint Andrew Press, 2009)

Media offices
Preceded by George McKechnie	Editor of The Herald; 1997–2000	Succeeded by Mark Douglas-Home
