= Enslow Publishing =

American publishing company

Coordinates: 40°40′50.74″N 74°25′57.21″W

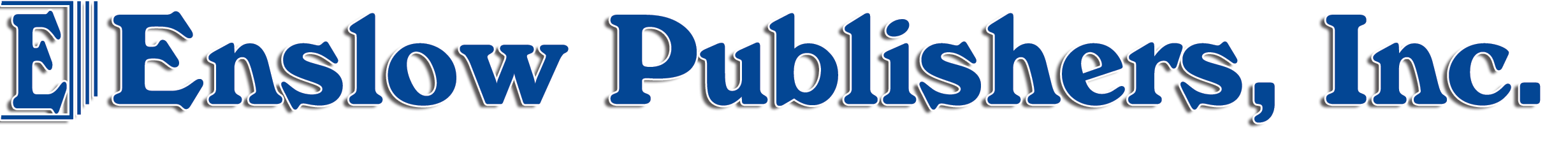
- Status: Active
- Founded: 1976
- Founder: Ridley M. Enslow, Jr.
- Successor: Ridley (Mark) Enslow III (President), Brian Enslow (Vice-President & Publisher)
- Country of origin: United States
- Headquarters location: Berkeley Heights, New Jersey
- Distribution: Worldwide
- Publication types: Books, eBooks
- Nonfiction topics: Biographies, Science project ideas and how-to's
- Fiction genres: Historical fiction
- Imprints: MyReportLinks.com, Enslow Elementary, Blue Wave Classroom, Speeding Star, Chasing Roses
- Owner: Roger Rosen
- No. of employees: 40 (2013)
- Official website: enslow.com

Enslow Publishing is an American publisher of books and eBooks founded by Ridley M. Enslow Jr. in 1976. Enslow publishes educational nonfiction, fiction, historical fiction, and trade books for children and young adults. Their books are intended to be sold to school and public libraries.

Its current imprints include Enslow Elementary, Speeding Star and Chasing Roses. MyReportLinks.com Books and Bailey Books are currently out-of-print imprints. MyReportLinks.com Books is the properly formatted name.

Enslow uses third-party authors to write the manuscripts, and uses in-house editorial and production staff to create their final products. Marketing, warehousing, and shipping operations are conducted at their headquarters in Berkeley Heights location.

Enslow was acquired by Roger Rosen of Rosen Publishing in 2014.

== Notable books ==
Enslow Publishers has published titles that have won many awards. Most recently is the title Jesse Owens: "I Always Loved Running" written by Jeff Burlingame won an NAACP Image Award for Outstanding Literary Work – Youth/Teens.

- Jesse Owens: "I Always Loved Running", Jeff Burlingame (2011) NAACP Image Award Winner
- Malcolm X: "I Believe in the Brotherhood of Man, All Men ", Jeff Burlingame (2011) NAACP Image Award Nomination
- Kenneth Glyn Jones (ed.): "Webb Society Deep-Sky Observer's Handbook - 2nd edition", eight volumes, published 1986

== Imprints ==
Imprints include Enslow Elementary, Speeding Star (established in 2013 and unveiled at BookExpo America in June 2013), Chasing Roses, Scarlet Voyage, and MyReportLinks.com Books.

== See also ==
- List of English language book publishers
- List of publishers of children's books
- List of group-0 ISBN publisher codes
- List of group-1 ISBN publisher codes
- List of English-language small presses
