= NGCA =

NGCA may refer to:

- Northern Gallery for Contemporary Art, contemporary art gallery which is based in Sunderland, England
- Women's Golf Coaches Association, formerly known as the National Golf Coaches Association
