= Infinitas Learning =

Dutch educational publishing company

- Predecessor: Wolters Kluwer Education
- Founded: 2007
- Country of origin: Netherlands
- Headquarters location: Utrecht
- Publication types: Books
- Owner: NPM Capital
- Official website: infinitaslearning.com

Infinitas Learning is a Dutch educational publishing company. It was formed from Bridgepoint Capital's purchase of the educational division of Wolters Kluwer. Compass Partners acquired Infinitas from Bridgepoint in 2016. NPM Capital (a private equity firm owned by SHV Holdings) acquired Infinitas from Compass in 2021.

== Imprints ==
The company issues books under the following imprints (brands):

=== Current ===
- Noordhoff Uitgevers (Netherlands)
- Futurewhiz (Netherlands)
- Liber (Sweden)
- Plantyn (Belgium)
- WSiP (Poland)
- LeYa (Portugal)

=== Former ===
- Nelson Thornes (UK): Sold 2013 to Oxford University Press
- Bildungsverlag EINS (Germany): Sold 2013 to Westermann Verlagsgruppe
- Digital Spirit (Germany): Sold 2014 to Idox plc
- Jugend & Volk (Austria): Sold 2012 to Westermann Verlagsgruppe
- Muszaki Kiadó (Hungary): Sold 2013 to local education publisher, Konsept-H
- LJ Create (UK): Sold 2015 to Management
