= The Caravan Gallery =

Itinerant British exhibition space and art project

The Caravan Gallery is a socially engaged British visual arts project and mobile exhibition space founded in 2000 by artists and photographers Jan Williams and Chris Teasdale. Operating from a 1969 mustard-yellow caravan, the project uses colour photography to create images showing overlooked, absurd, and bizarre aspects of everyday life across Britain and beyond.

The Caravan Gallery has completed over 200 exhibitions in settings ranging from supermarket car parks and high streets to international art galleries and art festivals.

== Origins ==
The Caravan Gallery was founded in 2000 in response to a commission from Portsmouth City Council and artists' studio group Art Space Portsmouth, who issued a call-out for an accessible public artwork to mark the Millennium Bank Holiday weekend celebrations. Jan Williams, a member of the studio group Art Space Portsmouth, devised the concept of a mobile gallery housed in a caravan – a format that could bring contemporary art directly to people in the spaces they already inhabited. Its inaugural appearance took place on Southsea seafront. The project was originally intended to be for one weekend but has been running for 25+ years.

== The caravan ==
The gallery is housed in a 1969 egg-shaped yellow caravan, which functions both as an exhibition space and as a symbol of the project. It draws in passers-by who might not usually engage with contemporary art, while simultaneously appealing to art audiences. As Williams and Teasdale have noted, the caravan functions as "a mini social club on wheels, bringing together people who would never normally connect".

== Artistic practice and themes ==
The Caravan Gallery's photographic archive spans more than two decades of observation of British life. Themes include local distinctiveness, absurd juxtapositions, maverick enterprises, and everyday creativity. The images range from the laugh-out-loud funny to the tragicomic, ambiguous, or simply confusing – and aim to challenge stereotypes and popular imagery used in tourist brochures and advertising.

The project has been described by Aesthetica as functioning as "an antidote to the tourist board's glorified perception of British life", presenting instead a diverse and multifaceted portrait of the country in all its particularity.

The artists' methodology is rooted in the concept of psychogeography: exploring the relationship of place to its social and cultural history. The resulting exhibitions aim to invite visitors to respond to the artists' observations of their own locality, unearthing details that locals themselves might not have noticed. Accessibility is important to The Caravan Gallery and it has operated across a wide range of settings, showing artworks in an Asda car park in Liverpool and at fashion designer Paul Smith's SPACE gallery in Tokyo; in a field in rural Belgium and at the Museum of Liverpool; at the Martin Parr Foundation in Bristol and in a bus shelter in Huntly, Aberdeenshire.

== Pride of Place Projects ==
From 2011 onwards, Williams and Teasdale expanded their practice with the development of Pride of Place Projects – participatory, place-based commissions that operate simultaneously as exhibitions and as alternative visitor information centres, where the visitors themselves provide the information. Typically sited in empty shops, pop-up spaces, or community venues, these projects are part exhibition, part social intervention, and part living archive.

Each Pride of Place Project begins with a launch event and ends with a closing celebration, creating a social space with genuine community ownership. Visitors contribute to a People's Map, a People's Wall, and a Creation Zone for drop-in workshops; local residents, artists, writers, and historians are offered a platform to respond to the area. Surveys ask questions such as "What slogan would you put on a 'Welcome to...' sign?" and "What pictures would you put on a postcard?" The results – drawings, paintings, sculptures, photographs, video footage, poems, found objects, and handmade souvenirs – evolve and accumulate throughout the duration of the project.

The social impact of this work has been formally assessed for Arts Council England, and documented as directly and positively affecting participants across domains including health and wellbeing, social inclusion and cohesion, community identity, community empowerment, and skills and knowledge.

Pride of Place Projects have taken place in an extensive range of locations across the UK and on occasion elsewhere, including Portsmouth, Oxford, Lytham St Annes, Liverpool, New Brighton (Wirral), Huntly (Aberdeenshire), Guernsey, Sunderland, Bradford, Cardiff, Preston, Middlesbrough, Southampton, Openshaw (Manchester), Barrow-in-Furness, Blyth, Coventry (Tile Hill), Wombwell, Burnley, Malmesbury, and Wetteren in Belgium.

Between 2015 and 2016, The Caravan Gallery undertook a major national Pride of Place Project Tour supported by an Arts Council England Strategic Touring grant, in partnership with six arts organisations: Northern Gallery for Contemporary Art (Sunderland), Impressions Gallery (Bradford), Ffotogallery / Diffusion Festival (Cardiff), Museum of Lancashire (Preston), Middlesbrough Institute of Modern Art (mima), and Solent Showcase (Southampton).

== Exhibitions and reach ==
Since 2000 The Caravan Gallery has mounted over 200 exhibitions, commissions, and appearances. The projects span a wide breadth of formats and contexts, including:

Solo gallery exhibitions at UK venues including: Middlesbrough Institute of Modern Art (mima), the Museum of Liverpool, Cooper Gallery (Barnsley), Northern Gallery for Contemporary Art (Sunderland), Impressions Gallery (Bradford), Aspex Gallery (Portsmouth).

International exhibitions in Tokyo (Paul Smith SPACE, touring to Fukuoka and Kyoto), Hangzhou (China), Belfast, Lithuania (Kaunas and Nida International Photography Symposium), Guernsey, and Belgium.

Photography festival participations including LOOK/13 Liverpool International Photography Festival, Format Festival, Derby; BOP Photobook Festival (Martin Parr Foundation), and Northern Eye Photography Festival (Colwyn Bay).

Commissions by Multistory for Blast! Festival (Sandwell), and by Northumberland County Council, Barnsley Museums, One Manchester, Coventry Libraries, Signal Film & Media (Barrow), and Wirral Borough of Culture.

Group show appearances including at the Towner Art Gallery (Eastbourne), The Hepworth Wakefield, and Portcullis House, UK Parliament (Jan Williams).

Residencies and community projects including at Mottisfont National Trust, Deveron Projects (Huntly), and Creative Partnerships commissions in schools.

In 2025 the project celebrated its 25th anniversary at Art Space Portsmouth Open Studios, and exhibitions continued into 2026 with commissions from Multistory (Wednesbury) and Culture Croydon, as well as a group show at the Museum of Liverpool.

== Publications ==
The Caravan Gallery has published books, limited edition prints, "reality postcards", and photographic merchandise. Publications include:

- Is Britain Great? (three volumes) – the series launched with an exhibition at Aspex Gallery, Portsmouth.
  - Is Britain Great? Portsmouth: Aspex Visual Arts Trust, 2006. ISBN 978-0955025815
  - Is Britain Great? 2. Manchester: Cornerhouse, 2009. ISBN 978-0956390103
  - Is Britain Great? 3. Manchester: Cornerhouse, 2011. ISBN 978-0956957108
- Welcome to Britain: A Celebration of Real Life (Hodder Headline, 2005; republished by teNeues, 2008) – launched at The Photographers' Gallery, London.
- extra{ordinary}: Photographs of Britain by The Caravan Gallery – a full-colour hardback with over 100 photographs, with an introduction by photographer Ken Grant and an essay by Alistair Robinson (former Director, NGCA), produced to accompany the 2015–16 national touring exhibition.
- Aberdeenshire Ways (Deveron Arts / Aberdeenshire Council, 2014)

Several commemorative Pride of Place Project publications have been produced for individual towns and cities, including Sunderland, Cardiff, Lytham St Annes, and Huntly.

Publications are designed in collaboration with IDprojects (Natalie Dowse and Phil Illingworth).

== Recognition and collections ==
The Caravan Gallery has received widespread critical coverage in national and international media, including The Guardian, British Journal of Photography, and Aesthetica magazine, as well as extensive television and radio coverage.

In 2024, Jan Williams and Chris Teasdale were awarded the Marsh Award for Excellence in Visual Arts Engagement, for "[bringing] the benefits of engaging in the arts to communities in 2024".

Works by The Caravan Gallery have been acquired by or donated to art and photography collections including the Hyman Collection of British Photography, Martin Parr Foundation (Bristol), Tate Photobook Collection (donated by Martin Parr), and Northern Gallery for Contemporary Art (Sunderland).

== Community and education work ==
Alongside its touring and exhibition work, The Caravan Gallery undertakes community and education commissions. An example is a Creative Partnerships commission at Fulbridge School, Peterborough, where Williams and Teasdale accompanied children on a trip to the seaside resort of Hunstanton and helped them produce an exhibition based on their observations. A permanent caravan was subsequently installed in the school playground to house the show.

The project regularly delivers talks and lectures at galleries, universities, arts organisations, and festivals. Curator Sara-Jayne Parsons coined a phrase that has become central to its identity: "Doing things with people rather than at them".

The Caravan Gallery has also worked with The Space (Arts Council England's digital arts initiative) as a case study in community engagement methodology.

== Ron's Place ==
A significant strand of The Caravan Gallery's work in the 2020s has been the campaign to save Ron's Place – an immersive art environment created over many decades by Jan Williams's late uncle, Ron Gittins (1939–2019), in a Victorian house in Birkenhead, Merseyside. Following Gittins' death, Williams and Teasdale established the Saving Ron's Place campaign to preserve and conserve the property and its contents. Press coverage of the campaign included an article in The Guardian.

In April 2024, Ron's Place was granted Grade II listed status – the first outsider art environment to be listed in the UK. The campaign has been supported by fundraising events including an exhibition at Future Yard, Birkenhead (Inspired by Ron's Place, 2023) and Ron's Place patron Jarvis Cocker donated proceeds from Good Pop, Bad Pop at Liverpool Playhouse to the campaign. A gift from the Muller Wimhurst Trust enabled the Wirral Arts & Culture Community Land Trust (WACCLT) – the team set up to manage Ron's Place – to purchase the building, and further funds are being sought to secure its long-term future.
