= William Barclay (theologian) =

Scottish author, presenter, minister, and professor

William Barclay CBE
- Born: 5 December 1907; Wick, Scotland
- Died: 24 January 1978 (aged 70); Glasgow, Scotland
- Employer: University of Glasgow

William Barclay (5 December 1907 – 24 January 1978) was a Scottish author, radio and television presenter, Church of Scotland minister, and Professor of Divinity and Biblical Criticism at the University of Glasgow. He wrote a set of Bible commentaries on the New Testament that sold 1.5 million copies.

== Life ==
Barclay's father was a bank manager. Barclay attended Dalziel High School in Motherwell and then studied classics at the University of Glasgow from 1925 to 1929, before studying divinity. He studied at the university during the year 1932–33. After being ordained in the Church of Scotland in 1933, he was minister at Trinity Church in Renfrew from 1933 to 1946, afterwards returning to the University of Glasgow as lecturer in the New Testament from 1947, and as Professor of Divinity and Biblical Criticism from 1963.

== Religious views ==
Barclay described himself theologically as a "liberal evangelical." Barclay expressed his personal views in his A Spiritual Autobiography (1977), and Clive L. Rawlins elaborates in William Barclay: prophet of goodwill: the authorised biography (1998). They included:

- belief in universal salvation: "I am a convinced universalist. I believe that in the end all men will be gathered into the love of God."
- pacifism: "war is mass murder".
- evolution: "We believe in evolution, the slow climb upwards of man from the level of the beasts. Jesus is the end and climax of the evolutionary process because in Him men met God."

The journalist James Douglas suggested Barclay was also "reticent about the inspiration of Scripture, critical of the doctrine of substitutionary atonement, and given to views about the virgin birth and miracles which conservatives would find either heretical or imprecise."

== Works ==
While professor, he decided to dedicate his life to "making the best biblical scholarship available to the average reader". The eventual result was the Daily Study Bible, a set of 17 commentaries on the New Testament, published by Saint Andrew Press, the Church of Scotland's publishing house. Despite the series name, these commentaries do not set a program of regular study. Rather, they go verse by verse through Barclay's own translation of the New Testament, listing and examining every possible interpretation known to Barclay and providing all the background information he considered possibly relevant, all in layman's terms. The commentaries were fully updated with the help of William Barclay's son, Ronnie Barclay, in recent years and they are now known as the New Daily Study Bible series.

The 17 volumes of the set were all best-sellers. A companion set giving a similar treatment to the Old Testament was endorsed but not written by Barclay. In 2008 Saint Andrew Press began taking the content of the New Daily Study Bibles and producing pocket-sized thematic titles called Insights. The Insights books are introduced by contemporary authors, broadcasters and scholars, including Nick Baines and Diane-Louise Jordan.

Barclay wrote many other popular books, always drawing on scholarship but written in a highly accessible style. In The Mind of Jesus (1960) he states that his aim was "to make the figure of Jesus more vividly alive, so that we may know him better and love him more".

Barclay's books on the gospels and Jesus include:

- The Gospels and Acts: Matthew, Mark and Luke
- The Gospels and Acts: John and Acts
- Discovering Jesus
- Jesus of Nazareth (a companion to the miniseries)
- Jesus As They Saw Him
- Crucified and Crowned
- The Mind of Jesus
- The Parables of Jesus
- The Plain Man Looks at the Beatitudes
- The Plain Man Looks at the Lord's Prayer
- The Old Law and the New Law
- And He Had Compassion: The Miracles of Jesus (Judson Press)
- We Have Seen the Lord!
- The Master's Men
- Fishers of Men

Barclay's books on New Testament studies include:

- The New Testament: A New Translation
- A Beginner's Guide to the New Testament
- The New Daily Study Bible (17 volumes covering the entire New Testament)
- Insights (Series currently extending to 8 titles)
- Good Tidings of Great Joy
- God's Young Church
- The Mind of St. Paul
- Many Witnesses, One Lord
- Flesh And Spirit: An Examination of Galatians 5:19–23
- Letters to the Seven Churches
- The Men, The Meaning, The Message of the Books
- Great Themes of the New Testament
- New Testament Words

Barclay also wrote two books on Old Testament passages:

- The Ten Commandments
- The Lord is My Shepherd

Barclay's theological introductions include:

- The Apostles' Creed
- Conversion
- The Promise of the Spirit
- The Lord's Supper
- Ethics in a Permissive Society
- At the Last Trumpet: Jesus Christ and the End of Time

Barclay's other books include:

- Introducing the Bible
- Growing in Christian Faith
- The Plain Man's Book of Prayers
- Communicating the Gospel (reprinted as Meditations on Communicating the Gospel)
- A Spiritual Autobiography
