= Mark Douglas-Home =

Scottish author and journalist

Mark Douglas-Home (born 31 August 1951) is a Scottish author and journalist. He was the editor of The Herald newspaper in Scotland 2000–2005.

== Early life ==
Douglas-Home was born on 31 August 1951. The son of Edward Charles Douglas-Home and Nancy Rose Straker-Smith, he was educated at Eton College and the University of the Witwatersrand, where he was the editor of the then anti-apartheid student newspaper, Wits Student. (An unrepentant Douglas-Home was deported from South Africa in 1970 by the government of the day, following a series of anti-government cartoons that were deemed offensive by Pretoria.) He was a reporter for the North London Weekly Herald, the Sunday Express, and the Edinburgh Evening News. He went on to work as Scotland Correspondent for The Independent, news editor and assistant editor for The Scotsman, deputy editor of the Scotland on Sunday, and editor of The Sunday Times Scotland.

Douglas-Home was appointed editor of The Herald, a nationally circulated broadsheet newspaper in Scotland, in 2000. During his tenure the paper introduced new daily themed magazines, and continued to sell more than The Scotsman. It was announced on 1 December 2005 that he was leaving the paper. In the months before this, budget cuts imposed on the paper by owners Newsquest and he had been resistant to these.

His first novel, The Sea Detective, was published by Sandstone Press in May 2011. A new edition was published by Penguin in November 2015. The Scotsman said it 'raises the bar' for Scottish crime fiction. The sequel, The Woman Who Walked into The Sea, was described as 'simply intoxicating' by the Library Journal in the USA. The third and fourth in the series, The Malice of Waves and The Driftwood Girls, were published respectively in May 2016 and January 2020. As a journalist, he is best known for having been the editor of The Herald newspaper in Scotland.

The noble title, the Earl of Home in the Peerage of Scotland, belongs to his family, and his cousin, David Alexander Cospatrick Douglas-Home is the current holder. His uncle, the previous holder, was Alec Douglas-Home, a former Prime Minister of the United Kingdom. He is married to Colette Douglas-Home, a psychotherapeutic counselor, who was formerly a journalist and columnist. The couple have two children called Rebecca Douglas-Home and Rory Douglas-Home.

== Bibliography ==
- The Sea Detective (2011)
- The Woman who Walked into the Sea (2013)
- The Malice of Waves (2016)
- The Driftwood Girls (2020)

Media offices
Preceded by Harry Reid	Editor of The Herald; 2000–2006	Succeeded by Charles McGhee
