= Rosen Publishing =

American publisher

- Founded: 1950
- Founder: Richard Rosen
- Country of origin: United States
- Headquarters location: New York City
- Publication types: Books
- Imprints: Gareth Stevens, Enslow Publishing, Cavendish Square, Jackdaw Publications, Greenhaven Press, Lucent Books, and KidHaven Press
- Official website: rosenpublishing.com

The Rosen Publishing Group is an American publisher for educational books for readers from ages pre-Kindergarten through grade 12. It was founded in 1950 under the name "Richards Rosen Press" and is located in New York City. It adopted its current name in 1982. Rosen focuses primarily on nonfiction titles for the school and library markets, including curriculum-aligned resources and reference work.

Rosen Publishing has expanded through the acquisition of several publishing companies. Rosen Publishing and owner Roger Rosen have acquired the following publishers as imprints: Roger Rosen became a co-owner of Gareth Stevens after the company was acquired from Reader's Digest in 2009. He acquired Marshall Cavendish’s North American library operation, renamed Cavendish Square, in 2013, and Enslow Publishing in 2014. Rosen Publishing acquired Jackdaw Publications in 2015 and the rights to Greenhaven Press, Lucent Books, and KidHaven Press from Gale in 2016.

Britannica Educational Publishing had 700+ titles in print for the school market in 2017 which it published in association with Rosen Educational Services, adding 100 new titles each year. It publishes Rosen Teen Health & Wellness is an interactive database of material for teens on gender identity, FGC, stalking, human trafficking and other issues that can affect teens. It was established in 2007.
