= Abbey Press =

Abbey Press may refer to:

- The Abbey Press (London), printers for Parliamentary Recruitment Committee's Single Men Show Your Appreciation poster
- Abbey Press (Saint Meinrad Archabbey)
- The Abbey Press (Fort Augustus, Scotland), at Fort Augustus Abbey
- Abbey Press (Los Angeles)
- The Abbey Press (New York) (1899–1903)
- Abbey Press (Farnborough), Saint Michael's Abbey Press, printers of cards and books, at St Michael's Abbey, Farnborough
- The Abbey Press (Edinburgh), by William H. White, printer for George Bell (publisher) and John Lane (publisher)
- The Abbey Press (St. Leo, Florida), printer for Saint Leo Abbey
