= Shire Books =

Imprint of British publisher Bloomsbury Publishing

- Parent company: Bloomsbury Publishing
- Founded: 1962
- Founder: John Rotheroe
- Country of origin: United Kingdom
- Headquarters location: London
- Publication types: Books
- Official website: www.bloomsbury.com/uk/non-fiction/history/heritage/

Shire Books are published by Bloomsbury Publishing, a book publishing company based in London, England, and formerly by Shire Publications Ltd. and Osprey Publishing. Shire offers low-priced, concise non-fiction paperbacks on a wide range of subjects. Shire books cover antiques and collectables, motoring and rural history, archaeology and Egyptology, architecture, industrial history and many other topics.

== First decades ==
Founded in 1962 by John Rotheroe, the company was for many years based in Princes Risborough, Buckinghamshire. The first book published by Shire was Discovering East Suffolk, a 24-page guide to the county through a series of five motoring routes and a gazetteer of the main towns and villages. It was given away to visitors via coach operators, local churches and tourist information points.

The book was successful and when it was realized that many of the copies given away were being resold it was decided to sell the second edition, and this set the template for the future of Shire.

Over the following years Shire expanded its Discovering series and launched several new series including Lifelines, Shire Albums, Shire Archaeology, and Shire Egyptology.

== 2007 onwards ==
In 2007 the company was acquired by Oxford-based military history publisher Osprey and operated from Osprey's offices in Oxford. During 2008 Shire began a revamp of its list. It was announced that several former Shire series (including Lifelines, Shire Garden History and History in Camera) would be absorbed into a new series called Shire Library, which would retain and expand on the numbering system used by the old Album series, which has long formed the backbone of the Shire Library. Books in the Shire Library were to have a new series cover design, as would reissued books in the Archaeology and Egyptology series.

It was further announced that Shire's list of forthcoming publications would include an increased number of new titles, as well as reissues of out-of-print titles, and new editions of existing titles.

In December 2010 Osprey Publishing, along with all the Shire titles, was acquired by Bloomsbury Publishing.
