= Jeff Burlingame =

American author

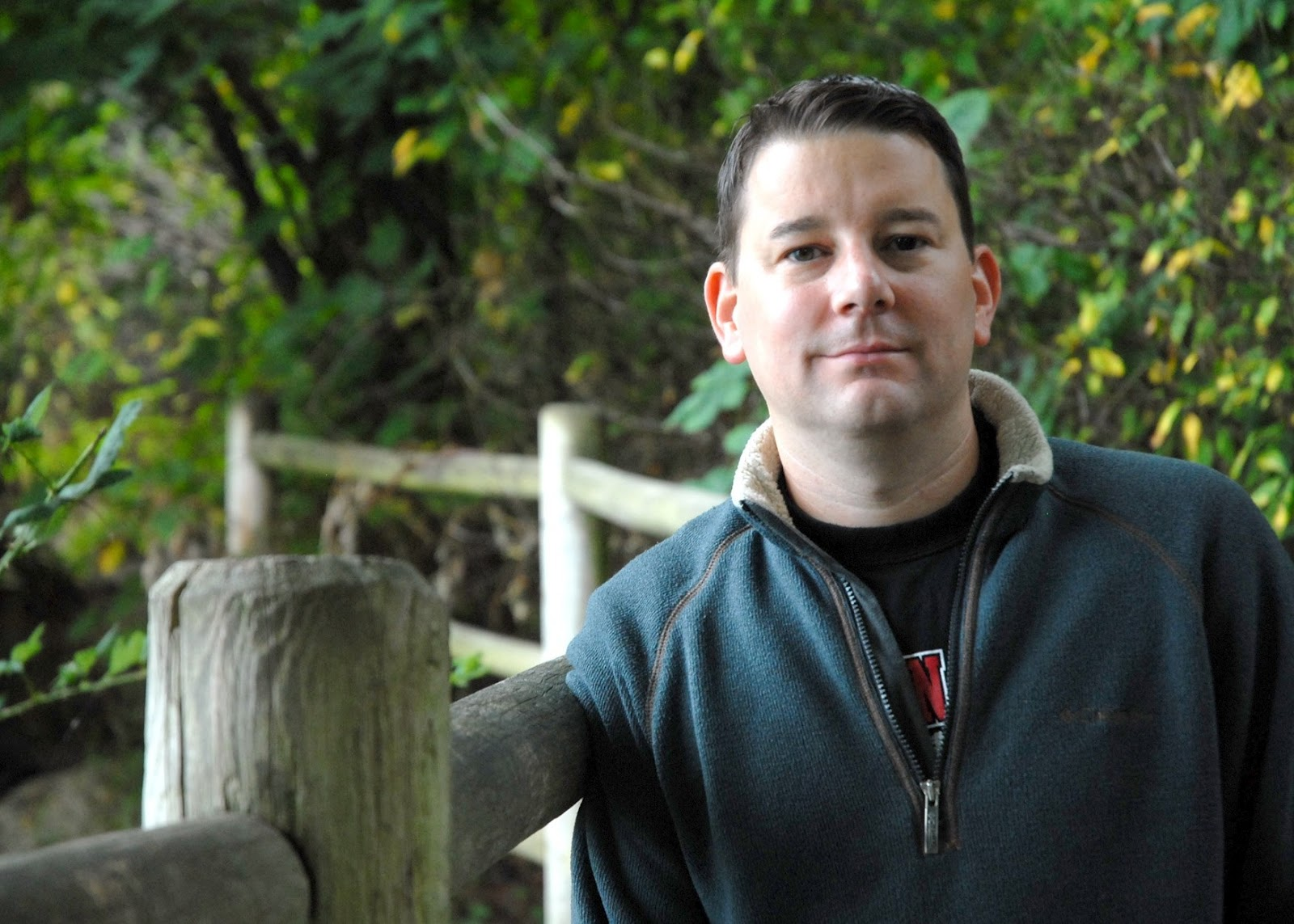
- Born: June 14, 1971 (age 55); Aberdeen, Washington
- Occupation: Author
- Writing career
- Period: 1997–present
- Genre: Nonfiction
- Notable works: Kurt Cobain: Oh Well, Whatever, Nevermind; Malcolm X: I Believe in the Brotherhood of Man, All Men; Jesse Owens: I Always Loved Running
- Notable awards: New York Public Library’s Books for the Teen Age; 2007 Kurt Cobain: Oh Well, Whatever, Nevermind; NAACP Image Awards; 2011 Malcolm X: I Believe in the Brotherhood of Man, All Men (nomination); NAACP Image Awards; 2012 Jesse Owens: I Always Loved Running

Jeff Burlingame (born June 14, 1971) is an American author of several books, including biographies of musicians John Lennon and Kurt Cobain. Other biographies he’s worked on consist of George Varnell, a prominent figure of his birth state of Washington. He is also known for his critical looks at the historic and tragic plights of the Lost Boys of Sudan and the crew and passengers of the Titanic. His books have been honored by the New York Public Library and the NAACP, which in 2012 awarded him its highest literary honor at a nationally televised event in Hollywood, California. The previous year, his biography of Malcolm X was nominated for an Image Award.

== Writing career ==
Jeff Burlingame began his professional writing career as a general assignment reporter for The Willapa Harbor Herald newspaper in Raymond, Washington. In 1997, he began working at The Daily World becoming the Aberdeen, Washington, paper's arts and entertainment editor shortly thereafter. In that capacity, he won numerous awards from the Society of Professional Journalists. In 2006, he became a copy editor for The News Tribune in Tacoma.

Later that year, Burlingame's first book, Kurt Cobain: Oh Well, Whatever, Nevermind, was published. The book won recognition from the New York Public Library as a Book for the Teen Age in 2007, and received rave reviews from publications across the United States. Following the success of his first book, Burlingame began working as a full-time author. In the years since, he has written more than 30 books, including an unauthorized biography of Malcolm X, which was nominated for a coveted NAACP Image Award, alongside the works of Walter Dean Myers, Sharon Draper, Rita Williams-Garcia, and former Secretary of State Condoleezza Rice.

In 2012, Burlingame was once again nominated for an Image Award, this time for his in-depth biography of Olympic track and field legend Jesse Owens, and traveled to Los Angeles, California for the award ceremonies, held at the historic Shrine Auditorium, in February 2012. Burlingame won the award for Best Literary Work: Youth/Teens, besting fellow authors Walter Dean Myers, Kekla Magoon, Jerdine Nolen, and Nikki Grimes.

== Kurt Cobain Memorial Foundation ==
In 2004, Burlingame, along with Aberdeen City Councilman Paul Fritts, founded the non-profit Kurt Cobain Memorial Foundation (formerly the Kurt Cobain Memorial Committee) to honor the late rock legend in his hometown. In 2005, the group installed a large sign reading "Welcome to Aberdeen: Come As You Are" at the east entrance to town. The non profit's future goals include a youth center and low-key memorial park. In September 2007, the foundation held its first rock concert, Lounge Acts, which drew hundreds of Nirvana fans across the globe. The event has been held each year since, growing larger each time.

== Bibliography ==
- Burlingame, Jeff (2006). Kurt Cobain: Oh Well, Whatever, Nevermind. Hardback ISBN 978-0-7660-2426-7; Paperback ISBN 978-0-7660-3255-2
- Burlingame, Jeff (2008). Hillary Clinton: A Life in Politics. ISBN 978-0-7660-2892-0
- Burlingame, Jeff (2008). Edgar Allan Poe: Deep Into That Darkness Peering. ISBN 978-0-7660-3020-6
- Burlingame, Jeff (2009). Jesse James: I Will Never Surrender. ISBN 978-0-7660-3353-5
- Burlingame, Jeff (2010). Aerosmith: Walk This Way. ISBN 978-0-7660-3236-1
- Burlingame, Jeff (2010). Malcolm X: I Believe in the Brotherhood of Man, All Men. ISBN 978-0-7660-3384-9(Nominee, 2011 NAACP Image Awards)
- Burlingame, Jeff (2010). John Lennon: Imagine. ISBN 978-0-7660-3675-8
- Burlingame, Jeff (2010). Avril Lavigne: Celebrity with Heart. ISBN 978-0-7660-3407-5
- Burlingame, Jeff (2011). Jesse Owens: I Always Loved Running. ISBN 978-0-7660-3497-6
- Burlingame, Jeff (2012). Government Entitlements. ISBNs: 9781608704910 (print); 9781608706433 (e-book)
- Burlingame, Jeff (2012). Prisons: Rehabilitate or Severely Punish? ISBN 978-1-60870-493-4
- Burlingame, Jeff (2011). Taylor Swift: Music Superstar. ISBN 978-0-7660-3870-7
- Burlingame, Jeff (2012). Titanic Tragedy. ISBNs: 9781608704507 (print); 9781608707225 (e-book)
- Burlingame, Jeff (2012). Story of Bad Boy Entertainment. ISBNs: 9781422221112 (hardcover); 9781422221242 (paperback); 9781422294635 (ebook)
- Burlingame, Jeff (2012). Moon Olympic Peninsula. ISBNs: 9781612381459 (paperback); B008724IEW (Kindle)
- Burlingame, Jeff (2012). Lost Boys of Sudan. ISBNs: 9781608704750 (print); 9781608706966 (ebook)
- Burlingame, Jeff (2013). Crystal Meth. ISBNs: 9781608708239 (print); 9781608708291 (ebook)
- Burlingame, Jeff (2013). Demi! Latina Star Demi Lovato. ISBN 978-0-7660-4169-1
- Burlingame, Jeff (2013). Alcohol. ISBNs: 9781608708222 (print); 9781608708284 (ebook)
- Burlingame, Jeff (2013). Across the Aisles: Sid Snyder's Remarkable Life in Groceries & Government. ISBN 1889320285 (paperback); ASIN: B00BJALX6A (Kindle)
