= Saint Andrew Press =

Publishing house of the Church of Scotland

- Parent company: Church of Scotland
- Founded: 1954
- Country of origin: United Kingdom
- Headquarters location: Edinburgh
- Distribution: Norwich Books and Music
- Publication types: Books
- Nonfiction topics: Christianity
- Official website: standrewpress.hymnsam.co.uk

Saint Andrew Press, established in 1954 to promote the works of the theologian William Barclay, is the publishing house of the Church of Scotland. It merged with Scottish Christian Press in 2005. In January 2011, Saint Andrew Press's sales, production, marketing and distribution operations were outsourced by the Church of Scotland to Hymns Ancient and Modern.
