= Northern Gallery for Contemporary Art =

- Location in Tyne and Wear

General information
- Location: Tyne and Wear, England, UK
- Coordinates: 54.911°N 1.382°W
- OS grid: NZ396575

Northern Gallery for Contemporary Art (NGCA) is a contemporary art gallery which is based in Sunderland, England. The gallery focuses on producing exhibitions of new work by emerging and established regional, national and international artists. The gallery relocated from its city centre location on Fawcett Street, and reopened in a generous 3000 square foot space inside National Glass Centre in March 2018. Prior to the opening of the Baltic Centre for Contemporary Art in Gateshead, NGCA was the largest venue dedicated to contemporary art in North East England.

In 2019, Northern Gallery for Contemporary Art was 50 years old, being the direct descendant of 'Bookshop Gallery' founded in 1969 and its successor Ceolfrith Arts Centre, later Northern Centre for Contemporary Art. During its fifty years it has given UK premieres to artists from Sean Scully to Claes Oldenberg and Coosje van Bruggen, from Sam Taylor-Wood to Spartacus Chetwynd, and given the first UK shows to Cory Arcangel and Harun Farocki.

It is only in its current incarnation that the gallery has been able to acquire works from artists. The gallery has begun a collection of contemporary art for the city of Sunderland that now includes over a hundred works.
