= Scholars' Facsimiles & Reprints =

Scholars' Facsimiles & Reprints was established in 1936 by Louis Sigmund Friedland (1884–1955), professor of English at New York University, with an editorial advisory council of 29 prominent scholars, and offices at 103 Park Avenue, New York City.

Currently, it is believed to be the oldest reprint publishing house in America with a continuous record of publication since 1936. More than 550 volumes, each prefaced with an introductory essay by a contemporary scholar, have appeared under its imprint.

Works are selected for publication because of their bibliographical rarity and scholarly importance as primary sources. The publications list is focused on English and American literature and history, philosophy, psychology, religion, maritime history, and women's studies, from the Renaissance through the 19th century.
