= Nelson Thornes =

British publishing company

- Status: Defunct
- Founded: 1968
- Successor: Oxford University Press
- Country of origin: England, UK
- Headquarters location: Cheltenham
- Publication types: Books
- Official website: www.nelsonthornes.com

Nelson Thornes was a publishing firm located in Cheltenham, UK.

Started in 1968, as Stanley Thornes, the company began primarily publishing English textbooks for students before branching out into other areas of education. In 2001 Stanley Thornes through its parent company Wolters Kluwer acquired Thomas Nelson & Sons, and Nelson Thornes was formed as a company. Nelson Thornes also includes acquired companies BEAM (BE a Mathematician) specialising in Primary Mathematics and Moorhouse Black (Now NTDL) who provide distance learning. Until January 2013, it was owned by Infinitas Learning, the former education division of Wolters Kluwer now owned by Bridgepoint Capital.

Nelson Thornes was purchased by Oxford University Press (OUP) in January 2013. Following acquisition, OUP decided to wind down Nelson Thornes as a separate entity, merging it with its existing Education division. The head office of Nelson Thornes in Cheltenham closed in March 2015, and all former Nelson Thornes products were made available via OUP. Nelson Thornes continues to exist as a dormant shell company, having not been formally liquidated by OUP.
