= Lists of books =

This is a list of book lists (bibliographies) on Wikipedia, organized by various criteria.

== General lists ==
- List of 18th-century British children's literature titles
- List of 19th-century British children's literature titles
- List of anonymously published works
- List of autobiographies
- List of books written by children or teenagers
- List of book titles taken from literature
- List of books by year of publication
- List of chess books
- List of children's books made into feature films
- List of Christian novels
- List of chronicles
- List of comic books
- List of computer books
- Lists of dictionaries
- Lists of encyclopedias
- List of fantasy novels
- List of gay male teen novels
- List of Glagolitic books
- List of historical novels
- List of Hollywood novels
- List of mathematics books
- List of novels based on comics
- List of novels based on video games
- List of poetry collections
- List of self-help books
- List of science fiction novels
- List of unpublished books by notable authors

== Selective lists ==
- 20th Century's Greatest Hits: 100 English-Language Books of Fiction
- Best-selling books
- Big Read
- Bokklubben World Library
- Children's classic books
- Great Books of the Western World
- Harvard Classics
- Le Monde's 100 Books of the Century
- Literary Taste: How to Form It
- Major English dictionaries
- Modern Library's 100 Best Novels
- Most expensive books and manuscripts
- Ninety-Nine Novels
- The Top 100 Crime Novels of All Time

== Subject lists ==
- Bibliography of advertising
- List of books about anarchism
- List of books with anti-war themes
- List of books about ballroom dancing
- List of books about business
- Bibliography of carriages and driving
- Bibliography of classical guitar
- Bibliography of Colditz Castle
- Bibliography of conservatism in the United States
- Bibliography of cricket
- Books on cryptography
- Bibliography of Danish architecture
- Bibliography of encyclopedias
  - Bibliography of encyclopedias: architecture and architects
  - Bibliography of encyclopedias: art and artists
  - Bibliography of encyclopedias: astronomy and astronomers
  - Bibliography of encyclopedias: aviation
  - Bibliography of encyclopedias: biology
  - Bibliography of encyclopedias: business, information and economics
  - Bibliography of encyclopedias: cuisine
  - Bibliography of encyclopedias: film, radio, television and mass communications
  - Bibliography of encyclopedias: general biographies
  - Bibliography of encyclopedias: geography
  - Bibliography of encyclopedias: history
  - Bibliography of encyclopedias: literature
  - Bibliography of encyclopedias: religion
- Bibliography of film by genre
  - Bibliography of film: documentary
  - Bibliography of film: film noir
  - Bibliography of film: horror
- List of feminist literature
- Bibliography of fly fishing
  - Bibliography of fly fishing (fly tying, stories, fiction)
  - Bibliography of fly fishing (species related)
- List of books about folklore
- Bibliography of Halloween
- Bibliography of Hindi cinema
- List of books and publications related to the hippie subculture
- Bibliography of Irish rail transport
- Bibliography of jazz
- Bibliography of law
- Bibliography of Music Literature
- List of books about mythology
- List of books about negotiation
- Psychedelic literature
- Bibliography of roller derby
- Bibliography of the Sangh Parivar
- List of books on self-help
- List of books about skepticism
- List of books about the skinhead subculture
- Bibliography of suburbs
- Bibliography of tourism
- List of books about video games
- Bibliography of Wikipedia

=== History ===
- Bibliography of 18th–19th century Royal Naval history
- Bibliography of the Arab–Israeli conflict
- Bibliography of Australian history
- Bibliography of British and Irish History
- Bibliography of Chinese history
- Bibliography of The Holocaust
- Bibliography of Japanese history
- Bibliography of the history of Lyon
- Bibliography of New Zealand history
- Bibliography of the Ottoman Empire
- Bibliography of the Rwandan genocide
- Bibliography of the War in Darfur
- Bibliography of World War I
- Bibliography of World War II

==== History of North America ====
- Bibliography of Canadian history
  - Bibliography of Alberta history
  - Bibliography of the 1837–38 insurrections in Lower Canada
  - Bibliography of Canadian military history
  - Bibliography of the Front de libération du Québec
  - Bibliography of Saskatchewan history
- Bibliography of Chicago history
- Bibliography of Idaho history
- Bibliography of the Kent State shootings
- Bibliography of the Lewis and Clark Expedition
- Bibliography of Midwestern history
- Bibliography of Montana history
- Bibliography of North Dakota history
- Bibliography of Oregon history
- Bibliography of the Reconstruction Era
- Bibliography of the Republican Party
- Bibliography of South Dakota history
- Bibliography of United States military history
  - Bibliography of the American Civil War
    - Bibliography of American Civil War Confederate military unit histories
    - Bibliography of American Civil War Union military unit histories
    - Bibliography of American Civil War battles and campaigns
    - Bibliography of American Civil War homefront
    - Bibliography of American Civil War military leaders
  - Bibliography of the American Revolutionary War
  - Bibliography of early U.S. naval history
  - Bibliography of the War of 1812
- Bibliography of Wyoming history

=== People ===
==== People in general ====
- Bibliography of the Ainu
- Bibliography of African women
  - Bibliography of Nigerian women
- Bibliography of Duwamish (tribe)
- Bibliography of the Western Apache
- List of autobiographies
- List of political career biographies
  - List of American political memoirs
  - List of Australian political memoirs
  - List of British political memoirs
  - List of books about prime ministers of Canada

==== Specific persons ====
- Bibliography of Apocalypse
- List of books about King Arthur
- Bibliography of James Bond
- Bibliography of Subhas Chandra Bose
- Bibliography of George H. W. Bush
- Bibliography of George W. Bush
- Bibliography of Jimmy Carter
- Bibliography of Whittaker Chambers
- Bibliography of Jean Chrétien
- Bibliography of Hillary Clinton
- List of books about Leonard Cohen
- Bibliography of works on Davy Crockett
- Bibliography of André Gide
- Bibliography of Ulysses S. Grant
- Bibliography of works on Che Guevara
- Bibliography of Stephen Harper
- List of books about Adolf Hitler
- Bibliography of Wolfgang Hohlbein
- List of books about John Howard
- List of books about Allama Iqbal
- Bibliography of Thomas Jefferson
- List of books about Jesus
- Bibliography of Andrew Johnson
- Bibliography of Lyndon B. Johnson
- Bibliography of Kiss
- Bibliography of Abraham Lincoln
- Bibliography of works on Madonna
- Biographies of Karl Marx
- Bibliography of William McKinley
- Bibliography of works on Adolfas Mekas
- List of books about Muhammed
- Bibliography of Napoleon
- Bibliography of Richard Nixon
- Bibliography of Barack Obama
- Bibliography of Yasujirō Ozu
- Bibliography of Louis-Joseph Papineau
- Bibliography of Barbara Park
- Bibliography of C. Northcote Parkinson
- Bibliography of Pope Pius XII
- Bibliography of Carlo Pollonera
- Bibliography of Ramakrishna
- Bibliography of Ayn Rand and Objectivism
- Bibliography of Ronald Reagan
- Bibliography of Jane Roberts
- Bibliography of William Howard Taft
- Bibliography of Justin Trudeau
- Bibliography of Harry S. Truman
- Bibliography of Donald Trump
- Bibliography of Swami Vivekananda
- Bibliography of George Washington

=== Regions and places ===
- Bibliography of Abkhazia
- Bibliography of Afghanistan
- Bibliography of the Ainu
- Bibliography of the Åland Islands
- Bibliography of Albania
- Bibliography of American Samoa
- Bibliography of Amsterdam
- Bibliography of Andorra
- Bibliography of Angola
- Bibliography of Anguilla
- Bibliography of Antarctica
- Bibliography of Antigua and Barbuda
- Aran Islands bibliography
- Bibliography of Aruba
- Bibliography of the Bahamas
- Bibliography of Bangalore
- Bibliography of Bhutan
- Bibliography of Boston
- Bibliography of British Columbia
- Bibliography of Canada
- Bibliography of Canadian provinces and territories
- Bibliography of Colorado
- Bibliography of Copenhagen
- Bibliography of Finland
- Bibliography of Ganges
- Bibliography of Nazi Germany
- Bibliography of Ghana
- Bibliography of Gibraltar
- Bibliography of Glacier National Park
- Bibliography of Greece
- Bibliography of Guadeloupe
- Bibliography of Guangzhou
- Bibliography of Guatemala
- Bibliography of Guernsey
- Bibliography of India
- Bibliography of Jersey
- List of books about Korea
- Bibliography of Los Angeles
- Bibliography of Martinique
- Bibliography of Montserrat
- Bibliography of Mount Rainier National Park
- Bibliography of New Brunswick
- Bibliography of New Caledonia
- Bibliography of New York (state)
- Bibliography of Nicaragua
- Bibliography of Niue
- Bibliography of Norfolk Island
- Bibliography of Nova Scotia
- Bibliography of Ontario
- Bibliography of the Ottoman Empire
- List of books about Oxford
- Bibliography of Pakistan
- Bibliography of Paraguay
- Bibliography of Paris
- Bibliography of Philadelphia
- Bibliography of the Pitcairn Islands
- Bibliography of Punjab
- Bibliography of Rivers State
- Bibliography of Saint Helena, Ascension and Tristan da Cunha
- Books about Seattle
- Bibliography of the Sierra Nevada
- Bibliography of Singapore
- Bibliography of South Georgia and the South Sandwich Islands
- Bibliography of Sri Lanka
- Bibliography of the Turks and Caicos Islands
- Bibliography of the United States Virgin Islands
- Bibliography of Uruguay
- Bibliography of the Vale of Glamorgan
- Bibliography of Varanasi
- Bibliography of Wake Island
- Bibliography of Western Sahara
- Bibliography of Yellowstone National Park

=== Religion ===
- Bibliography of Black theology
- List of Chinese Hymn Books
- Bibliography of Christadelphians
- List of Christian apologetic works
- Bibliography of Christianity in China
- Bibliography of Eastern Orthodoxy in the United States
- Bibliography of works on the Jehovah's Witnesses
- Bibliography of Opus Dei
- Bibliography of Prem Rawat and related organizations
- Bibliography of Scientology
- Bibliography of books critical of Scientology
- List of Shia books
- List of Sunni books
- Bibliography of books critical of Christianity
- Bibliography of books critical of Islam
- Bibliography of encyclopedias: religion
- Bibliography of justification (theology)
- List of books about mythology
- List of books of religious apologetics

=== Science ===
- Bibliography of Aeolian Research
- Bibliography of anthropology
- Bibliography of astronomy and astronomers
- Bibliography of biology
- Bibliography of biology (encyclopedias)
- Bibliography of code-switching
- List of books in computational geometry
- Bibliography of ecology
- List of textbooks in electromagnetism
- List of books about energy issues
- List of environmental books
- List of evolution books
- List of textbooks on classical mechanics and quantum mechanics
- List of medical textbooks
- List of books about mushrooms
- List of books about nuclear issues
- Bibliography of popular physics concepts
- Bibliography of science and technology in Canada
- Bibliography of sociology
- Bibliography of sustainability
- List of textbooks in thermodynamics and statistical mechanics

== Writer lists ==
- List of books by Agatha Christie
- List of books by Amory Lovins
- List of books by Andre Norton
- List of books by Astrid Lindgren
- List of books by Barbara Cartland
- List of works by Clark Ashton Smith
- List of books by Clive Hamilton
- List of Dr. Seuss books
- List of books by Enid Blyton
- List of books by Frank Macfarlane Burnet
- List of books by Friedrich Hayek
- List of books by G. K. Chesterton
- List of books by Graham Greene
- List of books by H. G. Wells
- List of works by H. P. Lovecraft
- List of books by Hilaire Belloc
- List of books by Isaac Asimov
- List of books by J. R. R. Tolkien
- List of books by Jacques Derrida
- List of works by John Neal
- List of works by Jorge Luis Borges
- List of works by Kurt Vonnegut
- List of works by Leo Tolstoy
- List of books by Madonna
- List of books by Martin Luther
- List of books by Mary Berry
- List of books by Max Weber
- List of works by Neil Gaiman
- List of books by P. G. Wodehouse
- List of works by Pierre Schaeffer
- List of works by Piers Anthony
- List of works by Ray Bradbury
- List of works by Robert Morrison
- List of works by Søren Kierkegaard
- List of works by Stephen King
- List of books by Thomas Hunt Morgan
- List of works by Vladimir Nabokov
- List of works by W. H. Auden
- List of books by William Gibson

== Series lists ==
- List of Angel books
- List of Animorphs books
- List of The Baby-sitters Club books
- List of Beechwood Bunny Tales books
- List of Berenstain Bears books
- List of Biggles books
- List of Boxcar Children books
- List of Buffy the Vampire Slayer books
- List of Care Bears books
- List of Charmed books
- List of Conflict of the Ages books
- List of Cyberpunk 2020 books
- List of Darkover books
- List of Doc Savage novels
- List of Doctor Who books
- List of Flight 29 Down books
- List of FoxTrot books
- List of Ghost Stations books
- List of Goosebumps books
- List of GURPS books
- List of Harry Potter books
- List of Murder, She Wrote novels
- List of Nancy Drew books
- List of Oz books
- List of Primeval books
- List of Puddle Lane books
- List of Railway Series Books
- List of Rainbow Magic books
- List of Savage Worlds books
- List of The Secret World of Alex Mack books
- List of Selby books
- List of Shadowrun books
- List of Space: 1999 books
- List of Star Wars books
- List of Stargate books
- List of Sweet Valley University Books
- List of Thoroughbred novels
- List of Tugs books
- List of Very Short Introductions books
- List of Warriors books
- List of X-Files books

== Lists of manuscripts ==
- List of manuscripts
- List of Glagolitic manuscripts
- List of illuminated manuscripts
- List of Hiberno-Saxon illustrated manuscripts
- List of New Testament papyri
- List of New Testament uncials
- List of codices
- List of National Treasures of Japan (writings: Japanese books)
- List of Tangut books

== Mixed media lists ==
Lists that include books:

- List of cyberpunk works
- List of nuclear holocaust fiction
- List of steampunk works
- List of time travel in fiction
- List of works published posthumously
- List of television series made into books

== Lists by setting ==
- List of fiction set in ancient Greece
- List of fiction set in ancient Rome and the Roman Empire
- List of fiction set in Berlin
- List of fiction set in Chicago
- List of fiction set in Crete
- List of fiction set in Equatorial Guinea
- List of fiction set in Geneva
- List of fiction set in New Orleans
- List of fiction set in New York City
- List of fiction set in Nottingham
- List of fiction set in Oregon
- List of fiction set in Pittsburgh
- List of fiction set in San Diego
- List of fiction set in Shanghai
- List of fiction set in South Africa
- List of fiction set in Stockholm
- List of fiction set in Toronto

== Miscellaneous ==
=== Banned books ===
- List of books banned by governments
- List of books banned in India
- List of books banned in New Zealand
- List of most commonly challenged books in the United States
- List of authors and works on the Index Librorum Prohibitorum

=== Psychoactive drugs ===
- List of non-fiction books about alcohol abuse
- List of books about cannabis
- List of books about cocaine
- List of books about LSD
- List of psychedelic literature

== See also ==
- List of children's literature authors includes their best known works
- List of young adult writers includes their best known works
- List of libraries
- List of literary awards
- 1001 Books You Must Read Before You Die
- The 100 Most Influential Books Ever Written
- Science Fiction: The 100 Best Novels
- Category:Book series

=== Other lists ===
- List of books bound in human skin
- Lists of bookstores
- Lists of important publications in science
- List of books about neuro-linguistic programming
- List of pessimistic literature
- Lists of writers
- Lists of The New York Times number-one books
- Book censorship by country

=== Digital libraries ===
- Google Books
- HathiTrust
- Internet Archive
- Internet Public Library
- List of digital library projects
- Online Books Page
- Online public access catalogs
- Project Gutenberg
- Wikisource
