= Bibliography of encyclopedias: architecture and architects =

This is a list of encyclopedias and encyclopedic/biographical dictionaries published on the subject of architecture and architects in any language. Entries are in the English language except where noted.

== A ==
- Ambrose, Gavin; Harris, Paul; Stone, Sally (1 February 2008). The Visual Dictionary of Architecture. AVA Publishing. ISBN 978-2-940373-54-3.
- Anderson, Janice (30 September 2006). The Encyclopedia of North American Architecture. Chartwell Books. ISBN 978-0-7858-2091-8.
- Arany, Lynne, Archie Hobson. Little museums: Over 1,000 small and not-so-small American showplaces. H. Holt, 1998. ISBN 0805048235.
- Arnold, Dieter (20 January 2003). The Encyclopedia of Ancient Egyptian Architecture. Princeton University Press. ISBN 978-0-691-11488-0.
- Association of Collegiate Schools of Architecture. Guide to architecture schools. Association of Collegiate Schools of Architecture Press, 1998. ISSN 1097-2552.

== B ==
- Bails, Benito (1802). Diccionario de arquitectura civil (in Spanish). Viuda de Ibarra.
- Ballast, David Kent (1998). The Encyclopedia of Associations and Information Sources for Architects, Designers, and Engineers. M.E. Sharpe. ISBN 978-0-7656-0035-6.
- Banham, Joanna, Leanda Shrimpton. Encyclopedia of interior design. Fitzroy Dearborn, 1997. ISBN 1884964192.
- Bannister, Fletcher. History of Architecture. Butterworth, 1987.
- Birnbaum, Charles A., Robin S. Karson. Pioneers of American landscape design. McGraw Hill, 2000. ISBN 0071344209.
- Bloom, Jonathan; Blair, Sheila (23 March 2009). The Grove Encyclopedia of Islamic Art & Architecture: Three-volume set. Oxford University Press. ISBN 978-0-19-530991-1.
- Broto, Carles; Camacho, Monika (10 July 2007). Visual Dictionary of Architecture & Construction. Linksbooks.net. ISBN 978-84-96424-29-6.
- Bruyn, Gerd de (2008). Die enzyklopädische Architektur: Zur Reformulierung einer Universalwissenschaft (in German). transcript Verlag. ISBN 978-3-89942-984-8.
- Bucher, Ward (21 September 1996). Dictionary of Building Preservation. Wiley. ISBN 978-0-471-14413-7.
- Burden, Ernest (5 December 2001). Illustrated Dictionary of Architecture. McGraw-Hill Professional. ISBN 978-0-07-137529-0.
- Burden, Ernest E. (20 January 2004). Illustrated Dictionary of Architectural Preservation. McGraw-Hill. ISBN 9780071428385.
- Burden, Ernest E. (2005). Illustrated dictionary of building design and construction. McGraw-Hill. ISBN 978-0-07-144506-1.

== C ==
- Calloway, Stephen; Cromley, Elizabeth; Powers, Alan (31 May 2012). The Elements of Style: An Encyclopedia of Domestic Architectural Detail. Firefly Books Limited. ISBN 978-1-77085-086-6.
- Campbell, Gordon. The Grove encyclopedia of classical art and architecture. Oxford University Press, 2007. ISBN 9780195300826.
- Carey, Moya (16 December 2010). The Illustrated Encyclopedia of Islamic Art and Architecture: A Comprehensive History of Islam's 1,400-Year Legacy of Art and Design, With 500 Color Photographs, Reproductions and Fine-Art Paintings. Lorenz Books. ISBN 978-0-7548-2087-1.
- Caves, Roger W. (12 July 2005). Encyclopedia of the City. Taylor & Francis. ISBN 978-0-415-25225-6.
- Chappell, David; Powell-Smith, Vincent; Marshall, Derek; Cavender, Simon (12 May 2008). Building Contract Dictionary. Wiley. ISBN 978-0-470-77994-1.
- Ching, Francis D. K. (6 September 2011). A Visual Dictionary of Architecture. John Wiley & Sons. ISBN 978-0-470-64885-8.
- Cisneros, Alfredo Plazola; Anguiano, Alfredo Plazola; Anguiano, Guillermo Plazola (1998). Enciclopedia de arquitectura Plazola (in Spanish). Plazola Editores. ISBN 978-968-7478-00-5.
- Coates, Michael; Brooker, Graeme; Stone, Sally (1 December 2008). The Visual Dictionary of Interior Architecture and Design. AVA Publishing. ISBN 978-2-940373-80-2.
- Colvin, Howard Montagu. A biographical dictionary of British architects, 1600–1840. Yale University Press, 1995. ISBN 0300060912.
- Cowan, Henry J. (13 August 2004). Dictionary of Architectural and Building Technology. Taylor & Francis. ISBN 978-0-415-31234-9.
- Curl, James Stevens (2000). "Table of contents". A Dictionary of Architecture and Landscape Architecture. Encyclopedia.com.
- Curl, James Stevens (1 May 2007). A Dictionary of Architecture and Landscape Architecture. Oxford University Press, USA. ISBN 978-0-19-860678-9.
- Curl, James Stevens (1 January 1993). Encyclopaedia of Architectural Terms. Donhead. ISBN 978-1-873394-04-5.
- Curl, James Stevens. Encyclopaedia of architectural terms. Donhead, 1997. ISBN 187339425X.

== D ==
- Davies, Nikolas; Jokiniemi, Erkki (26 July 2012). Dictionary of Architecture and Building Construction. Routledge. ISBN 978-1-136-41025-3.
- Davies, Nikolas; Jokiniemi, Erkki (4 May 2012). Architect's Illustrated Pocket Dictionary. Routledge. ISBN 978-1-136-44406-7.
- Dhaky, Madhusudan A. (1983). Encyclopedia of Indian Temple Architecture: North India, pt. 1. Foundations of North Indian Style c.250 B.C.-A.D. 1100 (Text and plates), pt. 2. Period of early maturity c.A.D. 700-900. American Institute of Indian Studies. ISBN 978-0-19-561537-1.
- National Museum of Denmark, Danske Kirker (Danish Churches), freely searchable database providing extensive details of about two thirds of Denmark's churches (57 volumes with over 37,000 pages). Contains accounts from issues published between 1933 and the present covering different regions of Denmark, available online or usually also in book form. (in Danish)

== E ==
- Emanuel, Muriel. Contemporary architects. St. James Press, 1994. ISBN 1558621822.
- Emilio, Garroni (2015). Diccionario de arquitectura: voz creatividad (in Spanish). Nobuko. ISBN 978-987-584-120-8.
- Encyclopedia of World Architecture.. Facts on File, 1977.

== F ==
- Fee, Chen Voon (1998). The Encyclopedia of Malaysia: Architecture. Archipelago Press. ISBN 978-981-3018-43-3.
- La Enciclopedia de Cuba: Arquitectura. Artes plásticas. Música (in Spanish). Enciclopedia y Clásicos Cubanos. 1977. ISBN 9788435900973.
- Felstead, Alison; Franklin, Jonathan (20 December 2001). Directory of British Architects, 1834-1914: Vol. 1 (A-K). Continuum International Publishing Group. ISBN 978-0-8264-5513-0.
- Fleming, John, Hugh Honour, Nikolaus Pevsner. The Penguin dictionary of architecture and landscape architecture. Penguin, 1999. ISBN 014051323X.

== G ==
- Gaither, Carl C., Alma E. Cavazos-Gaither, Andrew Slocombe. Practically speaking: A dictionary of quotations on engineering, technology, and architecture. Institute of Physics, 1999. ISBN 0750305940.
- Goad, Philip; Willis, Julie (31 October 2011). The Encyclopedia of Australian Architecture. Cambridge University Press. ISBN 978-0-521-88857-8.
- Guedes, Pedro. Encyclopedia of Architectural Terminology: An Encyclopedic Survey of Changing Forms, Materials, and Concepts. McGraw-Hill, 1979.
- Guedes, Pedro (19 July 1979). The Macmillan Encyclopedia of Architecture and Technological Change. Macmillan. ISBN 978-0-333-26766-0.
- Guthrie, John Patten (12 January 2012). Interior Designers Portable Handbook 3/E. McGraw-Hill Prof Med/Tech. ISBN 978-0-07-178207-4.

== H ==
- Harris, Cyril M. American architecture: An illustrated encyclopedia. W.W. Norton, 1998. ISBN 0393730298.
- Harvey, John (1987). English mediaeval architects: a biographical dictionary down to 1550. Supplement to the revised edition of 1984. Pinhorns. ISBN 9780901262240.

== I ==
- International Dictionary of Architects and Architecture. St. James Press, 1993.

== J ==
- Johnson, Donald Leslie, Donald Langmead. Makers of 20th century modern architecture: A bio-critical sourcebook. Greenwood Press, 1997. ISBN 0313293538.

== L ==
- Langmead, Donald; Garnaut, Christine (1 December 2001). Encyclopedia of Architectural and Engineering Feats. ABC-CLIO. ISBN 978-1-57607-112-0.
- Lester, Walter. American Shelter: An Illustrated Encyclopedia of the American Home. Overlook Press, 1981.

== M ==
- Marrs, Texe (2008). Mysterious Monuments: Encyclopedia of Secret Illuminati Designs, Masonic Architecture, and Occult Places. Rivercrest Industries. ISBN 978-1-930004-46-7.
- Maclean, James H.; Scott, John S. (1993). The Penguin Dictionary of Building. Penguin. ISBN 978-0-14-051239-7.
- McLeod, Virginia (1 September 2010). Encyclopedia of Detail in Contemporary Residential Architect. Laurence King Publishers. ISBN 978-1-85669-692-0.
- Meister, Michael W., Madhusudan A. Dhaky American Institute of Indian Studies. Encyclopedia of Indian temple architecture. Philadelphia: American Institute of Indian Studies; University of Pennsylvania Press, 1983–. ISBN 0812278402.
- Midant, Jean-Paul (5 February 2004). Diccionario Akal de la Arquitectura del siglo XX (in Spanish). Ediciones Akal. ISBN 978-84-460-1747-9.
- Moavenzadeh, Fred (14 March 1990). Concise Encyclopedia of Building and Construction Materials. MIT Press. ISBN 978-0-262-13248-0.

== O ==
- Oliver, Paul (27 November 1997). Encyclopedia of Vernacular Architecture of the World. Cambridge University Press. ISBN 978-0-521-56422-9.

== P ==
- Packard, Robert T.; Korab, Balthazar; Hunt, William Dudley (1980). Encyclopedia of American architecture. McGraw-Hill. ISBN 978-0-07-048010-0.
- Palmer, Allison Lee (30 September 2009). The A to Z of Architecture. Scarecrow Press. ISBN 978-0-8108-6895-3.
- Palmer, Allison Lee (28 September 2008). Historical Dictionary Of Architecture. Scarecrow Press. ISBN 978-0-8108-5821-3.
- Palmer, Allison Lee (1 February 2011). Historical Dictionary of Neoclassical Art and Architecture. Scarecrow Press. ISBN 978-0-8108-6195-4.
- Palmer, Allison Lee (10 June 2011). Historical Dictionary of Romantic Art and Architecture. Scarecrow Press. ISBN 978-0-8108-7222-6.
- Parker, John Henry (17 June 2004). A Concise Dictionary of Architectural Terms. Courier Dover Publications. ISBN 978-0-486-43302-8.
- Pehnt, Wolfgang (1964). Encyclopedia of modern architecture. H. N. Abrams.
- Penguin Dictionary of Architecture. Penguin USA, 1991.
- Petersen, Andrew. Dictionary of Islamic architecture. Routledge, 1996. ISBN 0415060842.
- Petersen, Andrew (11 March 2002). Dictionary of Islamic Architecture. Taylor & Francis. ISBN 978-0-203-20387-3.
- Placzek, Adolf K. (1982). Macmillan Encyclopedia of Architects. Free Press. ISBN 978-0-02-925000-6.
- Architectural Publication Society (1887). The Dictionary of Architecture. T. Richards.

== Q ==
- Quincy, Quatremere De. Diccionario de arquitectura: voces teóricas (in Spanish). Nobuko. ISBN 978-987-584-119-2.

== R ==
- Runco, Mark A.; Pritzker, Steven R. (1999). Encyclopedia of Creativity. Elsevier. ISBN 978-0-12-227076-5.

== S ==
- Saylor, Henry H. (9 February 1994). Dictionary of Architecture. John Wiley & Sons. ISBN 978-0-471-75601-9.
- Schimmelman, Janice Gayle. Architectural books in early America: Architectural treaties and building handbooks available in American libraries and bookstores through 1800. Oak Knoll Press, 1999. ISBN 188471899X.
- Sennott, Stephen, ed. (2004). Encyclopedia of Twentieth Century Architecture. New York: Fitzroy Dearborn. ISBN 1579582435. ISBN 978-1579582432.
- Shoemaker, Candice A., Chicago Botanic Garden. Encyclopedia of gardens: History and design. Fitzroy Dearborn, 2001. ISBN 1579581730.
- Sillig, Julius; Williams, Henry W.; Barker, Edmund Henry (1837). Dictionary of the artists of antiquity: architects, carvers, engravers, modellers, painters, sculptors, statuaries, and workers in bronze, gold, ivory, and silver, with three chronological tables. Black and Armstrong.
- Stilling, Niels Peter (2004). Politikens bog om Danmarks kirker (in Danish). Politikens Forlag. ISBN 978-87-567-7226-6.
- Sturgis, Russell (1905). A Dictionary of Architecture and Building. New York: Macmillan. Vol. 1 (A–E), Vol. 2 (F–N), Vol. 3 (O–Z) at the Internet Archive.

== T ==
- Tatman, Sandra L.; Moss, Roger W. (1985). Biographical dictionary of Philadelphia architects, 1700-1930. G.K. Hall. ISBN 978-0-8161-0437-6.
- Taylor, Patrick. The Oxford companion to the garden. Oxford University Press, 2006. ISBN 9780198662556.

== W ==
- Walker, Les (1981). American Homes: The Illustrated Encyclopedia of Domestic Architecture. Black Dog & Leventhal. ISBN 978-1-57912-252-2.
- Ware, Dora (1967). A Short Dictionary of British Architects. Allen & Unwin.
- Wells, John E.; Dalton, Robert E. (1 May 1997). The Virginia architects, 1835-1955: a biographical dictionary. New South Architectural Press. ISBN 978-1-882595-02-0.
- Wilkes, Joseph A.; Packard, Robert T. (March 1990). Encyclopedia of Architecture: Design, Engineering & Construction. Wiley. ISBN 978-0-471-63351-8.
- Wilson, Dreck Spurlock. African-American architects: A biographical dictionary, 1865–1945. Routledge, 2004. ISBN 0415929598.

== Y ==
- Yarwood, Doreen (1986). Encyclopedia of Architecture. Facts on File.
- Yarwood, Doreen, Suhail Butt, Randall Van Vynckt. International dictionary of architects and architecture. St. James Press, 1993. ISBN 1558620893.

== Z ==
- Zirpolo, Lilian H. (30 August 2010). Historical Dictionary of Baroque Art and Architecture. Scarecrow Press. ISBN 978-0-8108-6155-8.

== See also ==
- Bibliography of encyclopedias
