= List of FoxTrot books =

There have been 42 FoxTrot books published so far, all by Andrews McMeel Publishing. Of the 42 books, 31 are collections and 11 are anthologies. The anthologies are composed of the two or three previous collections, and include Sunday strips in color.

== Collections ==
Beginning with Death by Field Trip, the size and shape of the regular collections changed to accommodate a new Sunday strip layout. The books also became shorter (and much cheaper) to create a larger gap between anthologies.

| Title | Publication Date | Dates Covered | ISBN |
|---|---|---|---|
| FoxTrot | 1989 | April 10, 1988 – January 22, 1989 | ISBN 0-8362-1856-6 |
| Pass the Loot | 1990 | January 23, 1989 - November 5, 1989 | ISBN 0-8362-1815-9 |
| Black Bart Says Draw | 1991 | November 6, 1989 - August 19, 1990 | ISBN 0-8362-1869-8 |
| Eight Yards Down and Out | 1992 | August 20, 1990 - June 2, 1991 | ISBN 0-8362-1884-1 |
| Bury My Heart at Fun-Fun Mountain | March 1993 | June 3, 1991 - March 15, 1992 | ISBN 0-8362-1706-3 |
| Say Hello to Cactus Flats | August 1993 | March 16, 1992 - December 27, 1992 | ISBN 0-8362-1720-9 |
| May the Force Be With Us, Please | March 1994 | December 28, 1992 – October 10, 1993 | ISBN 0-8362-1741-1 |
| Take Us to Your Mall | March 1995 | October 11, 1993 – August 7, 1994 | ISBN 0-8362-1780-2 |
| The Return of the Lone Iguana | April 1996 | August 8, 1994 – July 5, 1995 | ISBN 0-8362-1027-1 |
| At Least This Place Sells T-Shirts | September 1996 | July 6, 1995 – April 28, 1996 | ISBN 0-8362-2120-6 |
| Come Closer, Roger, There's a Mosquito on Your Nose | August 1997 | April 29, 1996 – March 3, 1997 | ISBN 0-8362-3656-4 |
| Welcome to Jasorassic Park | April 1998 | March 4, 1997 – December 28, 1997 | ISBN 0-8362-5183-0 |
| I'm Flying, Jack ...I Mean, Roger | September 1999 | December 29, 1997 – November 8, 1998 | ISBN 0-7407-0004-9 |
| Think iFruity | February 2000 | November 9, 1998 – September 12, 1999 | ISBN 0-7407-0454-0 |
| Death by Field Trip | April 13, 2001 | September 13, 1999 – May 14, 2000 | ISBN 0-7407-1391-4 |
| Encyclopedias Brown and White | September 6, 2001 | May 15, 2000 – December 31, 2000 | ISBN 0-7407-1850-9 |
| His Code Name Was The Fox | April 1, 2002 | January 1, 2001 – August 25, 2001 (minus week of July 23–28, 2001) | ISBN 0-7407-2191-7 |
| Your Momma Thinks Square Roots Are Vegetables | April 11, 2003 | August 26, 2001 – April 14, 2002 (plus week of July 23–28, 2001) | ISBN 0-7407-3299-4 |
| Who's Up for Some Bonding? | August 1, 2003 | April 15, 2002 – December 1, 2002 | ISBN 0-7407-3806-2 |
| Am I a Mutant, or What! | April 1, 2004 | December 2, 2002 – July 27, 2003 | ISBN 0-7407-4132-2 |
| Orlando Bloom Has Ruined Everything | March 31, 2005 | July 28, 2003 – March 14, 2004 | ISBN 0-7407-4999-4 |
| My Hot Dog Went Out, Can I Have Another? | August 1, 2005 | March 15, 2004 – October 31, 2004 | ISBN 0-7407-5441-6 |
| How Come I'm Always Luigi? | April 1, 2006 | November 1, 2004 – June 26, 2005 | ISBN 0-7407-5683-4 |
| Houston, You Have a Problem | March 1, 2007 | June 27, 2005 – February 19, 2006 | ISBN 0-7407-6352-0 |
| And When She Opened the Closet, All the Clothes Were Polyester! | August 1, 2007 | February 20, 2006 – December 31, 2006 | ISBN 978-0-7407-6838-5 |
| FoxTrot Sundaes | April 6, 2010 | January 7, 2007 – August 30, 2009 (Full-color) | ISBN 0-7407-9557-0 |
| Jasotron: 2012 | November 6, 2012 | September 6, 2009 – April 22, 2012 | ISBN 1-4494-2306-X |
| Some Clever Title | March 22, 2016 | April 29, 2012 – December 28, 2014 | ISBN 1-4494-7810-7 |
| Mother Is Coming | October 23, 2018 | January 4, 2015 - August 13, 2017 | ISBN 1-4494-9646-6 |
| Deliciously FoxTrot | September 28, 2021 | August 20, 2017 - April 12, 2020 | ISBN 1-5248-6976-7 |
| Big Dweeb Energy | April 30, 2024 | April 19, 2020 - December 25, 2022 | ISBN 978-1-5248-8748-3 |
| Impossibly FoxTrot | September 26, 2026 | 2023 - 2025 | ISBN 979-8881612016 |

== Anthologies ==
Originally, the anthologies were made up of the previous two smaller collections, with color Sunday strips (as opposed to black and white in the smaller books). Starting with FoxTrot: Assembled with Care, the anthologies were published in a larger size, made up of the three previous smaller books. When the comic transitioned to a Sundays-only format at the end of 2006, the anthologies stopped being produced.

| Title | Date | ISBN | Notes |
|---|---|---|---|
| FoxTrot: The Works | 1990 | ISBN 0-8362-1848-5 | Includes comics from FoxTrot and Pass the Loot. (4/10/88 - 11/05/89) |
| FoxTrot en masse | June 1992 | ISBN 0-8362-1897-3 | Includes comics from Black Bart Says Draw and Eight Yards Down and Out, plus a bonus Slug-Man comic. (11/06/89 - 6/02/91) |
| Enormously FoxTrot | September 1994 | ISBN 0-8362-1759-4 | Includes comics from Bury My Heart at Fun-Fun Mountain and Say Hello to Cactus Flats, plus bonus Paige and Pierre panels. (6/03/91 - 12/27/92) |
| Wildly FoxTrot | September 1995 | ISBN 0-8362-0416-6 | Includes comics from May the Force Be With Us, Please and Take Us to Your Mall, plus a look at the making of a FoxTrot Sunday strip. (12/28/92 - 8/07/94) |
| FoxTrot Beyond a Doubt | March 1997 | ISBN 0-8362-2694-1 | Includes comics from The Return of the Lone Iguana and At Least This Place Sells T-Shirts (8/08/94 - 4/28/96). |
| Camp FoxTrot | September 1998 | ISBN 0-8362-6747-8 | Includes comics from Come Closer, Roger, There's a Mosquito on Your Nose and Welcome to Jasorassic Park (4/29/96 - 12/28/97), plus a letter from Bill Amend. |
| Assorted FoxTrot | November 2000 | ISBN 0-7407-0532-6 | Includes comics from I'm Flying, Jack ...I Mean, Roger and Think iFruity (12/29/97 - 9/12/99). |
| FoxTrot: Assembled with Care | November 2, 2002 | ISBN 0-7407-2664-1 | Includes comics from Death by Field Trip, Encyclopedias Brown and White, and His Code Name Was The Fox (9/13/99-8/25/01, excluding 7/23/01 - 7/28/01). |
| FoxTrotius Maximus | September 1, 2004 | ISBN 0-7407-4661-8 | Includes comics from Your Momma Thinks Square Roots Are Vegetables, Who's Up for Some Bonding?, and Am I a Mutant, or What! (8/26/01-7/27/03, plus 7/23/01 - 7/28/01). |
| Jam-Packed FoxTrot | September 1, 2006 | ISBN 0-7407-6040-8 | Includes comics from Orlando Bloom Has Ruined Everything, My Hot Dog Went Out, Can I Have Another?, and How Come I'm Always Luigi? (7/28/03 - 6/26/05). |
| Wrapped-Up FoxTrot | May 19, 2009 | ISBN 0-7407-8158-8 | Includes comics from Houston, You Have A Problem, and And When She Opened the Closet, All Her Clothes Were Polyester! (6/27/05 - 12/31/06). |

== Other books ==
| Title | Date | ISBN | Notes |
|---|---|---|---|
| Math, Science, and Unix Underpants | October 1, 2009 | ISBN 0-7407-9140-0 | A collection of previously published math-and-science-themed strips. NOTE: The binary on the cover says "BUY THIS BOOK" multiple times. |
| The Best of FoxTrot | November 23, 2010 | ISBN 0-7407-7733-5 | Includes Bill Amend's favorite strips, with annotations. |
| AAAA!: A FoxTrot Assortment for Young Readers | October 2, 2012 | ISBN 0-7407-9140-0 | Themed collection for younger readers. Part of Andrews McMeel Publishing's AMP! Comics for Kids line. |
