= Bibliography of Singapore =

This page includes books about Singapore.

- Koninck, Rodolphe de; Drolet, Julie; Girard, Marc (2008). Singapore: An Atlas of Perpetual Territorial Transformation. NUS Press. ISBN 978-9971-69-397-8.
- Lee, Edwin (2008). Singapore: The Unexpected Nation. Institute of Southeast Asian Studies. ISBN 978-981-230-796-5.
- Frost, Mark Ravinder; Balasingamchow, Yu-Mei (19 February 2013). Singapore: A Biography. Editions Didier Millet. ISBN 978-981-4385-16-9.
- Hutton, Wendy (2007). Singapore Food. Marshall Cavendish. ISBN 978-981-261-321-9.
- Leasor, James (1 January 2001). Singapore: The Battle That Changed the World. House of Stratus. ISBN 978-0-7551-0039-2.
- Rau, Dana Meachen (2004). Singapore. Marshall Cavendish. ISBN 978-0-7614-1727-9.
- Palmer, John (2002). Singapore. Broken Jaw Press. ISBN 978-1-896647-85-2.
- Chong, Terence (2011). The Theatre and the State in Singapore: Orthodoxy and Resistance. Routledge. ISBN 978-0-415-58448-7.
- Ebrahim, Naleeza; Yee, Yaw Yan (2006). Singapore. Marshall Cavendish. ISBN 978-981-232-922-6.
- Eng, Lai Ah (2008). Religious Diversity in Singapore. Institute of Southeast Asian Studies. ISBN 978-981-230-754-5.
- Perry, Martin; Kong, Lily; Yeoh, Brenda S. A. (1997). Singapore: a developmental city state. Wiley. ISBN 978-0-471-97190-0.
- Trocki, Carl A. (2006). Singapore: Wealth, Power and the Culture of Control. Psychology Press. ISBN 978-0-415-26386-3.
- Haas, Michael (1 January 1999). The Singapore Puzzle. Greenwood Publishing Group. ISBN 978-0-275-96379-8.
- Quah, Jon S. T. (2010). Public Administration Singapore-style. Emerald Group Publishing. ISBN 978-1-84950-924-4.
- Chua, Beng-Huat (1997). Communitarian Ideology and Democracy in Singapore. Psychology Press. ISBN 978-0-415-16465-8.
- Huff, W. G. (13 August 1997). The Economic Growth of Singapore: Trade and Development in the Twentieth Century. Cambridge University Press. ISBN 978-0-521-62944-7.
- Ng, Peter K. L.; Corlett, Richard; Tan, Hugh T. W. (2011). Singapore Biodiversity: An Encyclopedia of the Natural Environment and Sustainable Development. Editions Didier Millet. ISBN 978-981-4260-08-4.
- Afendras, Evangelos A.; Kuo, Eddie C. Y. (1980). Language and Society in Singapore. NUS Press. ISBN 978-9971-69-016-8.
- Barr, Michael D.; Skrbiš, Zlatko (2008). Constructing Singapore: Elitism, Ethnicity and the Nation-building Project. NIAS Press. ISBN 978-87-7694-029-4.
- Lim, Peter H. L. (2009). Chronicle of Singapore, 1959-2009: Fifty Years of Headline News. Editions Didier Millet. ISBN 978-981-4217-75-0.
- George, Cherian (2000). Singapore: The Air-conditioned Nation : Essays on the Politics of Comfort and Control, 1990-2000. Landmark Books. ISBN 978-981-3065-46-8.
- Chia, Lin Sien (1991). The Biophysical Environment of Singapore. NUS Press. ISBN 978-9971-69-144-8.
- Abshire, Jean (21 March 2011). The History of Singapore. ABC-CLIO. ISBN 978-0-313-37743-3.
- Yeoh, Brenda S. A. (January 2003). Contesting Space in Colonial Singapore: Power Relations and the Urban Built Environment. NUS Press. ISBN 978-9971-69-268-1.
- Acharya, Amitav (December 2007). Singapore's Foreign Policy: The Search for Regional Order. World Scientific. ISBN 978-981-277-034-9.
- Heng, Derek Thiam Soon; Aljunied, Syed Muhd. Khairudin (2009). Reframing Singapore: Memory, Identity, Trans-regionalism. Amsterdam University Press. ISBN 978-90-8964-094-9.
- Tan, Kenneth Paul (2008). Cinema and Television in Singapore: Resistance in One Dimension. BRILL. ISBN 978-90-04-16643-1.
- Das, Sanchita Basu (3 August 2010). Road to Recovery: Singapore's Journey Through the Global Crisis. Institute of Southeast Asian Studies. ISBN 978-981-4311-05-2.
- Tan, Tai Yong (2019). Seven hundred years: a history of Singapore. Singapore: Marshall Cavendish Editions. ISBN 9814828106.
