= Bibliography of encyclopedias: geography =

This is a list of encyclopedias and encyclopedic/biographical dictionaries published on the subject of geography and geographers in any language. Entries are in the English language except where noted.

== General geography ==
- Baker, Daniel B. Explorers and discoverers of the world. Gale Research, 1993. ISBN 0810354217.
- Countries of the World. Bureau Development, 1991.
- Crump, Donald J. Exploring Your World: The Adventure of Geography. National Geographic Society, 1990.
- Cuff, David J. and William J. Young. The United States Energy Atlas. 2nd ed., Macmillan, 1986.
- Douglas, Ian, Richard J. Huggett, C. R. Perkins. Companion encyclopedia of geography: From local to global. Routledge, 2007. ISBN 9780415431699.
- Dow, Maynard Weston. Geographers on film: Visual record and archival resource. Geographers on Film, 1970–. Available online here.
- Dunbar, Gary S. Modern Geography: An Encyclopedic Survey. Garland, 1991.
- Dunbar, Gary S. A biographical dictionary of American geography in the twentieth century. Geoscience Publications, Dept. of Geography and Anthropology, Louisiana State University, 1996. ISBN 0938909002.
- Encyclopedic Dictionary of Physical Geography. Basil Blackwell, 1985.
- Freeman, Thomas Walter, Marguerita Oughton, Philippe Pinchemel, International Geographical Union. Geographers: Biobibliographical studies. Mansell. ISSN 0308-6992.
- Geo-Data: The World Geographical Encyclopedia. 2nd ed., Gale Research, 1989.
- Geopedia. Encyclopædia Britannica Corp., 1994.
- Gifford, Clive (1 June 2011). The Kingfisher Geography Encyclopedia. Kingfisher. ISBN 978-0-7534-3075-0.
- Gregory, Derek. The dictionary of human geography. Blackwell, 2009. ISBN 9781405132879.
- Haggett, Peter (2002). Encyclopedia of World Geography. Marshall Cavendish. ISBN 978-0-7614-7306-0.
- Handbook of the Nations, 9th ed., Gale Research, 1989.
- Hanks, Reuel R. (31 October 2011). Encyclopedia of Geography Terms, Themes, and Concepts. ABC-CLIO. ISBN 978-1-59884-295-1.
- Harte, John. Toxics A to Z: A Guide to Everyday Pollution Hazards. University of California Press, 1991.
- Howgego, Raymond John. Encyclopedia of exploration, 1800 to 1850: A comprehensive reference guide to the history and literature of exploration, travel and colonization between the years 1800 and 1850. Hordern House, 2004. ISBN 1875567399.
- Howgego, Raymond John. Encyclopedia of exploration, 1850 to 1940: The oceans, islands and polar regions; A comprehensive reference guide to the history and literature of exploration, travel and colonization in the oceans, the islands, New Zealand and the polar regions from 1850 to the early decades of the twentieth century. Hordern House, 2006. ISBN 1875567410.
- Howgego, Raymond John. Encyclopedia of exploration to 1800: A comprehensive reference guide to the history and literature of exploration, travel, and colonization from the earliest times to the year 1800. Hordern House, 2003. ISBN 1875567364.
- Huber, Thomas P. Dictionary of Concepts in Physical Geography. Greenwood, 1988.
- Huxley, Anthony. Standard Encyclopedia of the World's Monuments. Putnam, 1962.
- The Illustrated Encyclopedia of World Geography. Oxford University Press, 1990–1993.
- Jafari, Jafar. Encyclopedia of tourism. Routledge, 2000. ISBN 0415154057.
- Jones, Emrys. Marshall Cavendish Illustrated Encyclopedia: World and Its People. Rev. Ed., Marshall Cavendish, 1988.
- Kane, Joseph. Facts About the States. H. W. Wilson, 1989.
- Kemp, Karen Kathleen (2008). Encyclopedia of geographic information science. SAGE Publications. ISBN 978-1-4129-1313-3.
- Lands and Peoples. Rev. ed., Grolier, 1993.
- Larkin, Robert P., Gary L. Peters. Biographical dictionary of geography. Greenwood Press, 1993. ISBN 0313276226.
- Mccoll, R.W. (2005), Encyclopedia of World Geography, Infobase Publishing, free ebook from ebook3000.com, 1,216 pages. ISBN 9780816072293.
- Murray, Hugh (1842). The Encyclopedia of Geography.
- National Foreign Assessment Center (U.S.), United States. The World Factbook. Central Intelligence Agency, 1981–. ISSN 0277-1527. .
- Rand McNally Encyclopedia of World Rivers (1980), Rand McNally
- Pitzl, Gerald R. (2004). Encyclopedia of Human Geography. Greenwood Publishing Group. ISBN 978-0-313-32010-1.
- Sachs, Moshe Y. Worldmark Encyclopedia of the Nations. 7th ed., Wiley, 1988.
- Shapiro, William E. The Young People's Encyclopedia of the United States. Millbrook, 1992.
- Shekhar, Shashi, Hui Xiong. Encyclopedia of GIS. Springer, c2008. ISBN 9780387359755.
- Smith, Ben A., James W. Vining. American geographers, 1784–1812: A bio-bibliographical guide. Praeger, 2003. ISBN 0313323364.
- Statesman's Year Book: Statistical and Historical Annual of the States of the World. St. Martin's Press, 1864–.
- Steer, Francis W.; Eden, Peter; Bendall, A. Sarah (1997). Dictionary of land surveyors and local map-makers of Great Britain and Ireland 1530–1850. British Library. pp. 2 volumes.
- van der Leeden, Frits. The Water Encyclopedia: A Compendium of Useful Information on Water Resources. 2nd ed., Lewis Publishers, 1990.
- Waldman, Carl, Alan Wexler, Jon Cunningham. Encyclopedia of exploration. Facts On File, 2004. ISBN 9780816046782.
- Warf, Barney. Encyclopedia of geography. Sage Publications, 2010. ISBN 9781412956970.
- Warf, Barney (16 May 2006). Encyclopedia of Human Geography. Sage Publications. ISBN 978-0-7619-8858-8.
- Weatherhill, Craig; Everson, Michael (2009). A Concise Dictionary of Cornish Place-Names. Evertype. ISBN 978-1-904808-22-0.
- The World Book Encyclopedia of People and Places. World Book, 1992.
- World Fact File. Facts on File, 1990.
- World Factbook. Quanta Press, 1989.

=== Africa ===
- Cambridge Encyclopedia of Africa. Cambridge University Press, 1981.

==== North Africa ====
- Cambridge Encyclopedia of the Middle East and North Africa. Cambridge University Press, 1988.

=== Americas ===
==== Caribbean ====
- Collier, Simon. The Cambridge Encyclopedia of Latin America and the Caribbean. 2nd ed., Cambridge University Press, 1992.

==== Latin America ====
- Collier, Simon. The Cambridge Encyclopedia of Latin America and the Caribbean. 2nd ed., Cambridge University Press, 1992.
- Nuñez, Benjamin. Dictionary of Afro-Latin American Civilization. Greenwood, 1980.

==== North America ====
- Bartlett, Richard A. Rolling Rivers: An Encyclopedia of America's Rivers. McGraw-Hill, 1984.
- Bender, Gordon L. Reference Handbook on the Deserts of North America. Greenwood, 1982.

===== Canada =====
- Encyclopedia Canadiana. Grolier, 1975.
- Marsh, James H. The Canadian Encyclopedia. 2nd ed., Hurtig Publishers, 1988.
- Marsh, James H. The Junior Encyclopedia of Canada. Hurtig Publishers, 1990.

===== United States =====
- Kane, Joseph Nathan, Charles Curry Allen. The American counties: Origins of county names, dates of creation, and population data, 1950–2000. Scarecrow Press, 2005. ISBN 0810850362.

====== Central West ======
- Encyclopedia of the Central West. Facts on File, 1989.

====== Far West ======
- Encyclopedia of the Far West. Facts on File, 1989.

====== Midwest ======
- Encyclopedia of the Midwest. Facts on File, 1989.

====== New England ======
- O'Brien, Robert and Richard D. Brown. The Encyclopedia of New England. Facts on File, 1985.

====== Southern United States ======
- Encyclopedia of the South. Facts on File, 1989.

=== Antarctica ===
- Stewart, John. Antarctica: An Encyclopedia. McFarland, 1990.

=== Asia ===
==== Central Asia ====
- Brown, Archie. The Cambridge Encyclopedia of Russia and the Former Soviet Union. 2nd ed., Cambridge University Press, 1993.
- The Great Soviet Encyclopedia. 3rd ed., Macmillan, 1973–83.

==== East Asia ====
===== China =====
- Cambridge Encyclopedia of China. 2nd ed., Cambridge University Press, 1991.
- Lin, Chun, Hans Hendrischke. The territories of the People's Republic of China. Routledge, 2006. ISBN 1857433955.

===== Japan =====
- Cambridge Encyclopedia of Japan. Cambridge University Press, 1993.
- Japan: An Illustrated Encyclopedia. Kodansha America, 1993.
- Kodansha Encyclopedia of Japan. Kodansha, 1983.
- Perkins, Dorothy. Encyclopedia of Japan: Japanese History and Culture from Abacus to Zori. Facts on File, 1991.

==== Russia ====
- Brown, Archie. The Cambridge Encyclopedia of Russia and the Former Soviet Union. 2nd ed., Cambridge University Press, 1993.
- The Great Soviet Encyclopedia. 3rd ed., Macmillan, 1973–83.
- Wilson, Andrew and Nina Bachkatov. Russia and the Commonwealth A to Z. HarperPerennial, 1992.

==== South Asia ====
===== Bangladesh =====
- Cambridge Encyclopedia of India, Pakistan, Bangladesh, Sri Lanka, Nepal, Bhutan, and the Maldives. Cambridge University Press, 1989.

===== Bhutan =====
- Cambridge Encyclopedia of India, Pakistan, Bangladesh, Sri Lanka, Nepal, Bhutan, and the Maldives. Cambridge University Press, 1989.

===== India =====
- Cambridge Encyclopedia of India, Pakistan, Bangladesh, Sri Lanka, Nepal, Bhutan, and the Maldives. Cambridge University Press, 1989.
- Chand, S. India: An Encyclopedic Survey. 1983.
- Chopra, P. N. Encyclopedia of India. Rima Publishing House, 1992–.

===== Maldives =====
- Cambridge Encyclopedia of India, Pakistan, Bangladesh, Sri Lanka, Nepal, Bhutan, and the Maldives. Cambridge University Press, 1989.

===== Pakistan =====
- Cambridge Encyclopedia of India, Pakistan, Bangladesh, Sri Lanka, Nepal, Bhutan, and the Maldives. Cambridge University Press, 1989.

===== Sri Lanka =====
- Cambridge Encyclopedia of India, Pakistan, Bangladesh, Sri Lanka, Nepal, Bhutan, and the Maldives. Cambridge University Press, 1989.

==== Western Asia ====
- Cambridge Encyclopedia of the Middle East and North Africa. Cambridge University Press, 1988.

===== Iran =====
- Yarshater, Ehsan. Encyclopedia Iranica. Routledge & Kegan Paul, 1982–.

=== Europe ===
==== Eastern Europe ====
- Brown, Archie. The Cambridge Encyclopedia of Russia and the Former Soviet Union. 2nd ed., Cambridge University Press, 1993.
- The Great Soviet Encyclopedia. 3rd ed., Macmillan, 1973–83.

===== Ukraine =====
- Kubijovyc, Volodymyr. Encyclopedia of Ukraine. University of Toronto Press, 1984–93.
- Ukraine: A Concise Encyclopedia. University of Toronto Press, 1963–70.

==== Western Europe ====
===== Iceland =====
- Icelandic Encyclopedia A–Ö

===== Ireland =====
- de Breffny, Brian. Ireland: A Cultural Encyclopedia. Facts on File, 1983.
- Lewis, Samuel. A topographical dictionary of Ireland: Comprising the several counties, cities, boroughs, corporate, market, and post towns, parishes, and villages, with historical and statistical descriptions . . . Genealogical Publishing Co., 1984. ISBN 0806310634.

===== United Kingdom =====
- Friar, Stephen. The local history companion. Sutton Publishing, 2001. ISBN 0750927224.

====== England ======
- Ekwall, Eilert. The concise Oxford dictionary of English place-names. Clarendon Press, 1960.
- Lewis, Samuel. A topographical dictionary of England. Institute for Historical Research, 1848. Available online here.
- Mills, A. D. A dictionary of British place-names. Oxford University Press, 2003. ISBN 0198527586.
- Watts, V. E., John Insley, Margaret Gelling. The Cambridge dictionary of English place-names: Based on the collections of the English Place-Name Society. Cambridge University Press, 2004. ISBN 0521362091.

====== Scotland ======
- Lewis, Samuel. A topographical dictionary of Scotland: comprising the several counties, islands, cities, burgh and market towns, parishes, and principal villages with historical and statistical descriptions. Genealogical Publ. Co., 1989. ISBN 9780806312552.
- Wilson, John M. The gazetteer of Scotland. Willow Bend Books, 2002.

=== Oceania ===
==== Australia ====
- Australian Encyclopedia. 5th ed., Australian Geographic Society, 1988.
- Cambridge Encyclopedia of Australia. Cambridge University Press, 1993.
- Shaw, John. The Concise Encyclopedia of Australia. 2nd ed., David Bateman Ltd., 1989.

==== New Zealand ====
- McLauchlan, Gordon. The Illustrated Encyclopedia of New Zealand. David Bateman Ltd., 1990.

=== Cities ===
- Cities of the World. Gale Research, 1982.
- Kurian, George Thomas. World Encyclopedia of Cities. ABC-Clio, 1993–.

=== Oceanography ===
- Couper, Alastair. The Times Atlas and Encyclopedia of the Sea. HarperCollins, 1989.
- Groves, Donald. Ocean World Encyclopedia. McGraw-Hill, 1980.
- Standard Encyclopedia of the World's Oceans and Islands. Putnam, 1962.

=== Rivers and lakes ===
- Bartlett, Richard A. Rolling Rivers: An Encyclopedia of America's Rivers. McGraw-Hill, 1984.
- Rand McNally Encyclopedia of World Rivers. Rand McNally, 1980.
- Standard Encyclopedia of the World's Rivers and Lakes. Putnam, 1966.

== See also ==
- Bibliography of encyclopedias
