= Bibliography of Gibraltar =

An incomplete bibliography of Gibraltar:

- Abulafia, David (2011). The Great Sea: A Human History of the Mediterranean. London: Allen Lane. ISBN 978-0-7139-9934-1.
- Aldrich, Robert; Connell, John (1998). The Last Colonies. Cambridge University Press. ISBN 978-0-521-41461-6.
- Alexander, Marc (2008). Gibraltar: Conquered by No Enemy. Stroud, Glos: The History Press. ISBN 978-0-7509-3331-5.
- Andrews, Allen (1958). Proud Fortress: the fighting story of Gibraltar. London: Evans Bros. OCLC 656066535.
- Archer, Edward G. (2006). Gibraltar, Identity and Empire. London: Routledge. ISBN 978-0-415-34796-9.
- Ayala, Lopez de (1845). The History of Gibraltar from the earliest period. Translated by James Bell. London: Pickering. OCLC 28301900.
- Bradford, Ernle (1971). Gibraltar: The History of a Fortress. London: Rupert Hart-Davis. ISBN 0-246-64039-1.
- Collins, Roger (1998). Spain: an Oxford archaeological guide. Oxford: Oxford University Press. ISBN 978-0-19-285300-4.
- Cornwell, B. (1782). A Description of Gibraltar: with an account of the blockade, siege, the attempt by nine sail of fire ships, the sally made from the garrison, and every thing remarkable or worthy notice that has occurred in that place since the commencement of the Spanish war. London: Richardson & Urquhart. OCLC 28817404.
- Devenish, David (2003). Gibraltar before the British. OCLC 499242153.
- Fa, Darren; Finlayson, Clive (2006). The Fortifications of Gibraltar 1068–1945. Fortress 45. Oxford: Osprey Publishing. ISBN 978-1-84603-016-1.
- Ford, Richard (1855). The Handbook for Travellers in Spain, Part 1. London: J. Murray. OCLC 603580513.
- Gold, Peter (2012). Gibraltar: British or Spanish?. Routledge. ISBN 978-0-415-34795-2.
- S.H. (1986). Hastings, Max (ed.). The Oxford Book of Military Anecdotes. Oxford University Press. ISBN 0-19-214107-4.
- Haverty, Martin (1844). Wanderings in Spain in 1843, Volume 1. London: T. C. Newby. OCLC 56000559.
- Hills, George (1974). Rock of Contention: A history of Gibraltar. London: Robert Hale & Company. ISBN 0-7091-4352-4.
- Jackson, William G. F. (1986). The Rock of the Gibraltarians. Cranbury, NJ: Associated University Presses. ISBN 0-8386-3237-8.
- Mackenzie, Alexander Slidell (1829). A Year in Spain. Boston: Hilliard, Gray, Little, and Wilkins. OCLC 2624910.
- Nelson, Horatio (1846). The Dispatches and Letters of Vice Admiral Lord Viscount Nelson, with notes by Sir N.H. Nicolas, Vol. 6. London: Henry Colburn.
- Padró i Parcerisa, Josep (1980). Egyptian-type documents: from the Mediterranean littoral of the Iberian peninsula before the Roman conquest, Part 3. Leiden, Netherlands: Brill Archive. ISBN 978-90-04-06133-0.
- Rose, Edward P.F. (2001). "Military Engineering on the Rock of Gibraltar and its Geoenvironmental Legacy". In Ehlen, Judy; Harmon, Russell S. (eds.). The environmental legacy of military operations. Boulder, CO: Geological Society of America. ISBN 0-8137-4114-9.
- Sáez Rodríguez, Ángel J. (8 August 2023). La montaña inexpugnable, Seis siglos de fortificaciones en Gibraltar (XII-XVIII)=IECG=2007. Algeciras. ISBN 978-84-88556-17-2.
- Shields, Graham J. (1987). Gibraltar. Oxford: Clio Press. ISBN 978-1-85109-045-7.
- Truver, Scott C. (1980). The Strait of Gibraltar and the Mediterranean, Volume 4. Alphen aan der Rijn, Netherlands: Martinus Nijhoff Publishers. ISBN 978-90-286-0709-5.
