= Doreen Yarwood =

English historian

Doreen Yarwood, née Cawthra (1919–1999) was an English historian of clothing, interiors and architecture.

== Life ==
Doreen Cawthra was born in Yorkshire on 12 December 1919, the daughter of the sculptor Hermon Cawthra. Trained in art and design, she lectured at several institutions, including in the Women's Royal Air Force. In 1948 she became a full-time writer. She was an extramural lecturer at Sussex University, the University of Surrey, and London University.

She was married to the physicist John Yarwood (1913-1987). After his retirement they moved to East Grinstead, where she played an active role in the East Grinstead Society.

She died on 19 July 1999 at Crawley Hospital.

== Works ==
- English Costume from the second century B.C. to 1950, with introductory chapters on the ancient civilisations. London: B.T. Batsford, 1952. 5th ed. 1979.
- The English Home: a thousand years of furnishing and decoration. London: Batsford, 1956.
- The Architecture of England: from prehistoric times to the present day. London: B. T. Batsford, 1963. 2nd ed., 1967.
- Outline of English Architecture. London: B.T. Batsford, 1965, 1977
- English Houses, 1966
- Outline of English Costume. London : B.T. Batsford, 1967.
- The Architecture of Italy. London: Chatto & Windus, 1969.
- Robert Adam. London: Dent, 1970
- The Architecture of Europe. 4 vols. New York: Hastings House, 1974. 3rd ed. 1987.
- European Costume: 4000 years of fashion. London: B. T. Batsford, 1975.
- The Architecture of Britain, B. T. Batsford: London, 1976. 3rd ed. 1980.
- The Encyclopedia of World Costume. New York: Scribner, 1978. 3rd ed. 1988.
- Costume of the Western World: pictorial guide and glossary. New York: St. Martin's Press, 1980.
- The British Kitchen, 1981
- Five Hundred Years of Technology in the Home. London: B.T. Batsford, 1983.
- English Interiors: pictorial guide and glossary. Guildford, Surrey: Lutterworth Press, 1983.
- Encyclopaedia of Architecture. London: B.T. Batsford, 1985.
- A Chronology of Western Architecture. London: B. T. Batsford Ltd, 1987.
- Science and the Home, 1987
- The Architecture of Europe: 19th and 20th Centuries, 1991
- Fashion in the Western World, 1500-1990. London: B.T. Batsford, 1992.
- The Architecture of Europe, 3000 BC to 1992. 4 vols., 1992.
