= Bibliography of C. Northcote Parkinson =

Cyril Northcote Parkinson (1909–1993) was a British naval historian and author of some 60 books, the most famous of which was his best-seller Parkinson's Law (1957), in which he advanced Parkinson's law, stating that "work expands so as to fill the time available for its completion".

This bibliography covers writing about Parkinson.

1. Baistow, Tom. "PARKINSON'S SECOND LAW." The Singapore Free Press 30 Mar. 1960: 6. Print
2. Parkinson, Cyril Northcote. "THE ART OF BEING NO.2 IN THE OFFICE." The Singapore Free Press 17 Oct. 1961: 6. Print.
3. "General Knowledge Quiz." The Singapore Free Press 23 Oct. 1961: 9. Print: "3. Who wrote Parkinson's Law? What connection did the author have with Singapore?"
4. "THE MALE AND FEMALE FIRMS - BY PARKINSON. Reuters." The Straits Times [Singapore] 3 Mar. 1962: 1. Print
5. "STOP-GO ECONOMY BY PARKINSON. The Straits Times [Singapore] 19 Mar. 1962: 10. Print
6. "Bill to amend constitution." The Straits Times [Singapore] 10 Jul. 1964: 20. Print
7. "Car insurance poser for the 'innocent' victim." The Straits Times [Singapore] 11 Jul. 1964: 15. Print
8. Geldard, Geoffrey. "The 'small-minded' Opposition: Chief Minister hits out." The Straits Times [Singapore] 17 Dec. 1966: 17. Print
9. "THE U.N. TRIES AGAIN." The Straits Times [Singapore] 16 Sep. 1970: 10. Print
10. "A Fiction." The Straits Times [Singapore] 14 Dec. 1970: 20. Print
11. "PAPER PAPER PAPER BACKS." New Nation [Singapore] 3 Jul. 1971: 9. Print
12. Sheppard, Trish. "Into the antique business by accident." New Nation [Singapore] 15 Sep. 1971: 7. Print
13. "PAPER PAPER PAPER BACKS." New Nation [Singapore] 16 Oct. 1971: 9. Print
14. Sheppard, Trish. "Helping those who live in a world of their own (in three parts)." New Nation [Singapore] 9—11 May 1972: 9. Print
15. "Talks to forge Asean link-up with EEC." The Straits Times [Singapore] 7 Jun. 1972: 15. Print
16. Holmberg, Judith. "Parkinson's 'law'" New Nation [Singapore] 19 Dec. 1973: 4. Print
17. Wilson, Dick. "TOWARDS A WORLD OF TRIBES." New Nation [Singapore] 23 Oct. 1974: 10. Print
18. "Danes learn to adjust welfare state to rule of necessity." The Straits Times [Singapore] 13 Apr. 1975: 24. Print
19. "Be thankful for our bureaucracy: PM." The Straits Times 17 Mar. 1976: 6. Print
20. The Straits Times [Singapore] 12 Nov. 1976: 16. Print
21. "SEARCHING FOR THE CURE. New Nation {Singapore] 16 Aug. 1977: 10, 11. Print
22. "Once upon a time, he'd very little to do. The Business Times [Singapore] 10 Dec. 1977: 11. Print
23. "Professor Parkinson's Law comes of age. NYT" The Business Times [Singapore] 21 Jun. 1978: 7. Print
24. "Professor Parkinson's Law comes of age. NYT" New Nation [Singapore] 24 Jun. 1978: 9. Print
25. Yap, Sonny. "Disney setting for crystal-ball gazing into Tomorrowland." New Nation [Singapore] 29 Sep. 1978: 9. Print
26. "Full marks for the full day. New Nation [Singapore] 8 Dec. 1978: 8. Print
27. Tho, Thian-Ser. "Thatcher changing welfare state to working system." The Straits Times [Singapore] 29 Oct. 1979: 16. Print
28. "Another new law from Parkinson. Reuters." The Business Times [Singapore] 19 Nov. 1979: 12. Print
29. "Parkinson's latest law. New Nation [Singapore] 19 Nov. 1979: 13. Print
30. "Singapore 1128. This shows policy is inconsistent." The Straits Times [Singapore] 3 Jan. 1980: 13. Print
31. "The Prof lays down the law again." New Nation [Singapore] 11 Jan. 1980: 8. Print
32. "Progress based entirely on performance." The Straits Times [Singapore] 30 Jan. 1980: 17. Print
33. "'She's the answer to strikes.' AFP." New Nation [Singapore] 18 Mar. 1980: 7. Print
34. "No 30 per cent answers." New Nation [Singapore] 21 Mar. 1980: 8. Print
35. "BOOKS I." The Straits Times [Singapore] 14 Jun. 1980: 1. Print
36. "The amazing art of getting things done.: New Nation [Singapore] 5 Mar. 1981: 29. Print
37. Simpson, Gavin. "Don't be blinkered by a job, says prof." New Nation[Singapore] 7 Jul. 1981: 9. Print
38. Chew, Robert. "Japan's Occupation bureaucracy studied. The Straits Times [Singapore] 3 Oct. 1981: 8. Print
39. "BOGAARS." The Straits Times [Singapore] 26 Oct. 1981: 12. Print
40. "Oberst's Law." New Nation [Singapore] 12 Nov. 1981: 2. Print
41. "Talking turkey. New Nation [Singapore] 3 Dec. 1981: 40. Print
42. Colverd, Gerald. "PREDATOR PRIZES. The Business Times [Singapore] 28 Dec. 1981: 9. Print
43. Tan, Suan-Ann. "History come-alive." The Straits Times [Singapore] 23 Jan. 1982: 1-2. Print
44. "Parkinson's story." The Straits Times [Singapore] 23 Jan. 1982: 7. Print
45. "Minister's reading list. The Straits Times [Singapore] 30 May 1982: 4. Print
46. Koh, Tse-Ying. "Getting along with people." The Business Times [Singapore] 4 Oct. 1982: 2. Print
47. Chew, Robert. "The other side of Japan." The Straits Times [Singapore] 20 Nov. 1982: 6. Print
48. Lee, Geok Boi. "Queue up, get ready for the hassle." The Straits Times [Singapore] 13 Mar. 1983: 3. Print
49. Colverd, Gerald. "Parkinson's law." The Business Times [Singapore] 20 Jun. 1983: 11. Print
50. "Murphy's Law as explained through science." The Straits Times [Singapore] 12 Sep. 1983: 16. Print]
51. "The Straits Times says... Parkinson's law." The Straits Times [Singapore] 8 Oct. 1983: 18. Print
52. Lee, Yoke-Meng. "One illustration too many." The Business Times [Singapore] 17 Oct. 1983: 8. Print
53. "Your Viewing And Listening Guide. SBC 5." The Straits Times [Singapore] 28 Jan. 1984: 24. Print: "8.40pm. Management - Parkinson's Law and the PeterPrinciple (Last episode/Chinese subtitles): The dangers and negative mechanisms of bureaucracy are discussed."
54. Gwee, Monica. "Speak, listen or sink." The Business Times [Singapore] 19 Mar. 1984: 2. Print
55. Ho, Chin-Beng. "How you can manage with humour and ease." The Straits Times [Singapore] 24 Mar. 1984: 7. Print
56. "When one head is better than 20." Singapore Monitor 21 Jun. 1985: 14. Print
57. "When one head is better than 20." Singapore Monitor (Afternoon Edition) 21 Jun 1985: 14. Print
58. Hoe, Irene. "Now for a word — or two or three — from your MPs." The Straits Times [Singapore] 26 Feb. 1986: 11. Print
59. Pates, Irene. "It's all in a day's work." The Straits Times [Singapore] 29 Jul. 1986: 1. Print
60. Thio, Lay-Hoon. "New Arrivals." The Straits Times [Singapore] 22 Nov. 1986: 8. Print
61. "High-tech free time: Boredom need not follow. The Economist." The Straits Times [Singapore] 16 May 1987: 18. Print
62. King, John Leonard (Baron King of Wartnaby). "Privatisation: the British Airways experience." The Business Times [Singapore] 27 Jul. 1987: 3. Print
63. "Parkinson'sLaw." The Straits Times [Singapore] 10 Oct. 1987: 2. Print
64. "At 78, essayist Parkinson is still laying down the laws. NYT." The Straits Times [Singapore] 10 Oct. 1987: 2. Print
65. Smith, D. J. "Beware of pastoral school system." The New Paper [Singapore] 3 Oct. 1988: 9. Print
66. "Firma sebenarnya satu organisasi." Berita Harian [Singapore] 16 Jan. 1989: 5. Print. [Malay]
67. "Where to, Mr President? From the Economist." The Straits Times [Singapore] 16 Mar. 1989: 23. Print
68. Leong, Chan-Teik. "Traffic flow at 15 kmh if vehicle growth not curbed." The Straits Times [Singapore] 6 Oct. 1992: 20. Print
69. Chan, Caroline and Robert Ng. "Stockbroking houses likely to pay out modest bonuses this year." The Straits Times [Singapore] 22 Dec. 1992: 40. Print
70. "Man behind Parkinson's Law dies, aged 83. Reuters." The Straits Times [Singapore] 12 Mar. 1993: 6. Print
71. "Reformers must fight Japan's bureaucracy." The Straits Times [Singapore] 1 Oct. 1993: 35. Print
72. "Elak gejala 'Parkinson.'" Berita Harian [Singapore] 26 Mar. 1994: 4. Print. [Malay]
73. Hadar, Leon. "Promoting underdevelopment." The Business Times [Singapore] 26 Apr. 1994: 16. Print
74. Ahmad, H. U. "Transforming Third World bureaucracy." The Business Times [Singapore] 30 Apr. 1994: 19. Print
75. "Attempting a record in a race against time." The Straits Times [Singapore] 8 Jul. 1995: 2. Print
76. Ancient Chinese examination system made relevant." The Straits Times [Singapore] 16 Mar. 1996: 24. Print
77. Tan, Suan-Ann. "Children live up to expectations, not IQ tests. The Straits Times [Singapore] 23 Nov. 2000: 26. Print
78. "Long lazy life. Today [Singapore] 30 Apr. 2001: 14. Print
79. "Govt bodies are well monitored. The Business Times [Singapore] 3 Sep. 2002: 8. Print
80. "Stop wasting time." The Straits Times [Singapore] 17 Oct. 2006: 22. Print
81. Today [Singapore] 18 Nov. 2006: 4. Print
82. "Every minute counts." The Straits Times [Singapore] 3 Dec. 2007: 74. Print
