= Bibliography of Copenhagen =

A list of works about Copenhagen, Denmark:

== List of books, arranged by author ==
- Aluminia, Kongelige Porcelainsfabrik & Fajancefabriken; Grandjean, Bredo L.; Helsted, Dyveke; Merete Bodelsen (1975). The Royal Copenhagen Porcelain Manufactory 1775–1975. The Manufactory.
- Borberg, Poul (1932). The Development of Telephonic Communication in Copenhagen, 1881–1931. Danmarks Naturvidenskabelige Samfund.
- Copenhagen, Dansk turistforening (1898). Copenhagen, the Capital of Denmark.
- Cunningham, Antonia (1 April 2011). DK Eyewitness Top 10 Travel Guide: Copenhagen. Dorling Kindersley Limited. ISBN 978-1-4053-5886-6.
- Datz, Christian; Kullmann, Christof (2005). Copenhagen: Architecture & Design. teNeues. ISBN 978-3-8327-9077-6.
- Geh, Alexander; Fletcher, Paul; Groftved, Jesper (1 January 2005). Copenhagen. APA Publications Services. ISBN 978-981-258-090-0.
- Genner, J. (1972). "The Medical Society of Copenhagen 1772–1972". Acta Historica Scientiarum Naturalium et Medicinalium. 27. Odense University Press: 1–345. ISBN 978-87-7492-066-3. PMID 4196177.
- Hayden, Arthur (1912). Royal Copenhagen Porcelain. McBride.
- Historiske meddelelser om København: Årbog (in Danish). Københavns Kommunalbestyrelse. 2004.
- Karageorghis, Vassos; Rasmussen, Bodil Bundgaard (2001). Ancient Cypriote Art in Copenhagen: The Collections of the National Museum of Denmark and the Ny Carlsberg Glyptotek. “The” A.G. Leventis Foundation. ISBN 978-9963-560-43-1.
- Larsen, Helge Eyvin (1960). The Circumpolar Conference in Copenhagen, 1958. Munksgaard.
- Larsen, Jørgen (2010). Gamle København (in Danish). Gyldendal A/S. ISBN 978-87-02-09000-0.
- Lauring, Kåre (2010). Københavnerliv (in Danish). Gyldendal A/S. ISBN 978-87-02-10475-2.
- Lind, Olaf; Lund, Annemarie (1996). Copenhagen architecture guide. Arkitektens forlag. ISBN 978-87-7407-162-4.
- Lindahl, Alfred (1960). "The poliomyelitis outbreak in Copenhagen in 1952: epidemiological studies". Acta Medica Scandinavica. Supplementum. 355. Copenhagen.: 1–167. PMID 14417046.
- Mouritsen, Lone; Osborne, Caroline (2004). The Rough Guide to Copenhagen. Rough Guides. ISBN 978-1-84353-070-1.
- Munch-Petersen, Thomas (2007). Defying Napoleon: How Britain Bombarded Copenhagen and Seized the Danish Fleet In 1807. Sutton. ISBN 978-0-7509-4279-9.
- Nielsen, Laura (16 April 2009). The Copenhagen protocol on climate change: an international negotiation competition: written submissions. Djøf Pub. ISBN 978-87-574-2096-8.
- Raabyemagle, Hanne; Smidt, Claus M. (1998). Classicism in Copenhagen: architecture in the age of C.F. Hansen. Gyldendal.
- Renouf, Norman (2003). Copenhagen and the Best of Denmark Alive!. Hunter Publishing, Inc. ISBN 978-1-58843-355-8.
- Sheehan, Sean (2003). Copenhagen. Footprint Handbooks. ISBN 978-1-903471-58-6.
- Stensgaard, Pernille; Schaldemose, Anne Prytz (2006). Copenhagen: People and Places. Gyldendal A/S. ISBN 978-87-02-04672-4.
- Thestrup, Poul (1971). The Standard of Living in Copenhagen 1730–1800: Some Methods of Measurements. University of Copenhagen. ISBN 978-87-505-0145-9.
- Woodward, Christopher (1998). Copenhagen. Manchester University Press. ISBN 978-0-7190-5193-7.

== List of works, arranged chronologically ==
=== Published in the 19th century ===
- David Brewster, ed. (1832). "Copenhagen". Edinburgh Encyclopædia. Philadelphia: Joseph and Edward Parker. hdl:2027/mdp.39015068302770.
- "Copenhagen". Hand-Book for Travellers in Denmark, Norway, Sweden and Russia. London: John Murray. 1839.
- Thomas Bartlett (1841). "Copenhagen". New Tablet of Memory; or, Chronicle of Remarkable Events. London: Thomas Kelly.
- Robert Baird (1842), "Copenhagen", Visit to Northern Europe, New York: John S. Taylor & Co., OCLC 8052123
- John Thomson (1845), "Copenhagen", New Universal Gazetteer and Geographical Dictionary, London: H.G. Bohn
- O. Nielsen, ed. (1872), Kjøbenhavns diplomatarium. Samling af dokumenter, breve og andre kilder til oplysning om Kjøbenhavns ældre forhold før 1728 [Collection of documents, letters and other sources of information on Copenhagen before 1728] (in Danish), Copenhagen: I kommission hos G.E.C. Gad, OL 6555560M
- Karl Baedeker (1873), "Copenhagen", Northern Germany (5th ed.), Coblenz: K. Baedeker, OCLC 5947482
- W. Pembroke Fetridge (1874), "Copenhagen", Harper's Hand-Book for Travellers in Europe and the East, New York: Harper & Brothers
- John Ramsay McCulloch (1880), "Copenhagen", in Hugh G. Reid (ed.), A Dictionary, Practical, Theoretical and Historical of Commerce and Commercial Navigation, London: Longmans, Green, and Co.
- Lucy Andersen (1888), Copenhagen and its Environs: a Guide for Travellers (2nd ed.), London: W. Scott, OL 7138246M

=== Published in the 20th century ===
- "Copenhagen", Norway, Sweden, and Denmark (8th ed.), Leipsic: Karl Baedeker, 1903
- "Kopenhagen". Brockhaus' Konversations-Lexikon (in German) (14th ed.). Leipzig: Brockhaus. 1908.
- Esther Singleton (1913), "City of Copenhagen", Great Cities of Europe, Garden City, N.Y.: Doubleday, Page
- Trudy Ring, ed. (1995). "Copenhagen". Northern Europe. International Dictionary of Historic Places. Fitzroy Dearborn. ISBN 978-1-136-63944-9.
- Peter Newman; Jeffrey Kenworthy (1999). "Case Studies in Overcoming Automobile Dependence: (Copenhagen)". Sustainability and Cities: Overcoming Automobile Dependence. Island Press. p. 204+. ISBN 978-1-59726-259-0.

=== Published in the 21st century ===
- "Denmark: Copenhagen", Scandinavian & Baltic Europe (5th ed.), Lonely Planet, 2001, p. 77+, OL 24836348M
- David Levinson, ed. (2004). "Copenhagen". Encyclopedia of Homelessness. Sage Publications. p. 83+. ISBN 978-0-7619-2751-8.
