= Bibliography of the Vale of Glamorgan =

A bibliography of books related to the Vale of Glamorgan, south Wales.

== General ==
=== Architecture ===
- An Inventory of the Ancient Monuments in Glamorgan: The Stone and Bronze Ages, Volume I, Part I. The Royal Commission on Ancient and Historical Monuments in Wales, Grosvenor Press. 1976. ISBN 978-0-11-700589-1.
- An Inventory of the Ancient Monuments in Glamorgan: The Iron Age and the Roman Occupation, Volume I, Part II. The Royal Commission on Ancient and Historical Monuments in Wales, Grosvenor Press. 1976. ISBN 978-0-11-700589-1.
- An Inventory of the Ancient Monuments in Glamorgan: The Early Christian Period, Volume I, Part III. The Royal Commission on Ancient and Historical Monuments in Wales, Grosvenor Press. 1976. ISBN 978-0-11-700589-1.
- An Inventory of the Ancient Monuments in Glamorgan: Farmhouses and Cottages, Volume II, Part IV. The Royal Commission on Ancient and Historical Monuments in Wales, Grosvenor Press. 1988.
- An Inventory of the Ancient Monuments in Glamorgan: The Early Castles: From the Norman Conquest to 1217, Volume III, Part I. The Royal Commission on Ancient and Historical Monuments in Wales, Grosvenor Press. 1982. ISBN 011701141X.
- An Inventory of the Ancient Monuments in Glamorgan: Medieval Non-defensive Secular Monuments, Volume III, Part II. The Royal Commission on Ancient and Historical Monuments in Wales, Grosvenor Press. 1982. ISBN 011701141X.
- An Inventory of the Ancient Monuments in Glamorgan: Domestic Architecture from the Reformation to the Industrial Revolution:The Greater Houses, Volume IV, Part I. The Royal Commission on Ancient and Historical Monuments in Wales, Grosvenor Press. 1981.
- An Inventory of the Ancient Monuments in Glamorgan: Domestic Architecture from the Reformation to the Industrial Revolution:Farmhouses and Cottages, Volume IV, Part II. The Royal Commission on Ancient and Historical Monuments in Wales, Grosvenor Press. 1988. ISBN 9780117007543.
- Orrin, Geoffrey R. (29 June 2004). Church building and restoration in Victorian Glamorgan: an architectural and documentary study. University of Wales Press. ISBN 978-0-7083-1837-9.

=== Culture ===
- Folklore of Glamorgan. Bowker British Library Kickout. 1986. ISBN 978-0-946043-16-3.
- The Vale of Glamorgan: scenes and tales among the Welsh. Saunders and Otley. 1839.
- Denham, H. M. (1839). Sailing Directions for the Bristol Channel. Hydrographic office.
- Donovan, Edward (1805). Descriptive excursions through South Wales and Monmouthshire: in the year 1804, and the four preceding summers. Printed for the author.
- Evans, Thomas Christopher (1887). The Folklore of Glamorgan. I. Foulkes.
- Rees, Anthony (1996). The Celtic legends of Glamorgan. Llanerch. ISBN 978-1-86143-021-2.

=== Geography ===
- The Glamorgan Village Book. Countryside Books. 1 October 1993. ISBN 978-1-85306-254-4.
- Clark, George Thomas (1861). An Outline of the Topography of Glamorgan.
- Evans, Cyril James Oswald (1938). Glamorgan: Its History and Topography. W. Lewis (Printers) Limited.
- Eyers, Michael (1 January 1992). Masters of the Coalfield: People and Place Names in Glamorgan and Gwent. Bowker British Library Kickout. ISBN 978-0-946043-27-9.

=== History ===
- Tattersall, Walter Medley (1936). Glamorgan County History: Natural History, Volume I. Printed and published for the Committee by William Lewis.
- Williams, Glanmor; Williams, Margaret Fay (1984). Glamorgan County History: Pre-history and Early History. Early Glamorgan, Volume II. Glamorgan County History Trust. ISBN 9780904730043.
- Pugh, T. B., ed. (1971). Glamorgan County History. Vol. III: The Middle Ages. Cardiff: University of Wales Press.
- Rees, James Frederick (1936). Glamorgan County History: Early Modern Glamorgan from the Act of Union to the Industrial Revolution, Volume IV. Printed and published for the Committee by W. Lewis (printers) limited. ISBN 9780904730043.
- John, Arthur; Williams, Glanmor (1980). Glamorgan County History: Industrial Glamorgan, Volume V. Glamorgan County Historical Trust, University of Wales Press.
- Minchinton, Walter E. (1969). Industrial South Wales, 1750-1914: Essays In Welsh Economic History. Cass. ISBN 978-0-7146-1344-4.
- Spencer, Marianne Robertson (1970). Annals of South Glamorgan: historical, legendary, and descriptive chapters on some leading places of interest. S. Williams.
- Williams, Glanmor (1988). Glamorgan County History: Glamorgan Society (1780-1980), Volume VI. Glamorgan County Historical Trust, University of Wales Press. ISBN 978-0-904730-05-0.
- Evans, Cyril James Oswald (1938). Glamorgan: Its History and Topography. W. Lewis (Printers) Limited.
- Patterson, Robert B. (2002). The Scriptorium of Margam Abbey and the Scribes of Early Angevin Glamorgan: Secretarial Administration in a Welsh Marcher Barony, C.1150-c.1225. Boydell & Brewer. ISBN 978-0-85115-851-8.
- Williams, Glanmor (1984). Early Glamorgan: pre-history and early history. Printed and published for the Committee by W. Lewis (printers) limited. ISBN 978-0-904730-04-3.

=== Photographic ===
- Denning, Roy (1 February 1986). Llantwit Major in Old Picture Postcards. European Library, The Netherlands. ISBN 978-90-288-3349-4.
- Denning, Roy (1987). The Vale of Glamorgan in Old Photographs. ISBN 9781870402101.
- Hignell, Andrew (1 November 1998). Glamorgan County Cricket Club: The Second Selection. Tempus. ISBN 978-0-7524-1137-8.
- Ings, D.G. (1 August 1990). Penarth 2. European Library, The Netherlands. ISBN 978-90-288-4911-2.
- Isaacs, Mark (June 2005). Around Penarth. Francis Frith Collection. ISBN 978-1-84589-020-9.
- Moody, Ian; Jones, Stephen K. (1 January 2004). Wenvoe and Twyn-Yr-Odyn. Tempus. ISBN 978-0-7524-2934-2.
- Tilney, Chrystal (1 September 2010). Dinas Powys from Old Photographs. Amberley Publishing. ISBN 978-1-4456-0164-9.
- Llantwit Major in Camera. D. Brown. 1979.

== Barry ==
- Barrie, D. S. M. (1978). The Barry Railway. Oakwood Press. ISBN 9780853612360.
- Beaudette, Gerald (1984). Barry Dock Hotel. Barry Preservation Society and Civic Trust. ISBN 978-0-948029-00-4.
- Chapman, Frederick; Jones, Thomas Rupert (1896). Report on the Microzoa in Marl and Silts from Barry Dock Near Cardiff.
- Davidhizar, Amy L. (2005). Health and Disease at the Atlantic Trading Estate, Barry, Wales: Analysis of an Early Medieval Welsh Population. Northern Illinois University.
- Davison, R. C. H. (1898). New Works at Barry Dock. Rees Jones, printer and stationer.
- Mitchell, Vic; Smith, Keith (2005). Branch Lines Around Barry: To Cardiff, Wenvoe, Penarth and Bridgend. Middleton Press. ISBN 978-1-904474-50-0.
- Tucker, Keith (1994). Chronicle of Cadoxton: A Treatise on the Local History and Layout of the Village of Cadoxton-juxta-Neath, West Glamorgan, with Information Also Relating to Cilffriw, Aberdulais and Ynysygerwn. Historical Projects. ISBN 978-0-9524338-0-4.
- Moore, Donald (1985). Barry: The Centenary book. Barry Centenary Book Committee. ISBN 978-0-9509738-1-4.
- History of the Barry Railway Company, 1884-1921. Printed by Tudor Print. Works. 1923.
- Tedstone, Mike (1 January 2005). Barry Railway Steamers. Oakwood Press. ISBN 978-0-85361-635-1.

== Cowbridge ==
- Cowbridge: Buildings and People - A Selection of the Buildings of Cowbridge and the People Who Have Lived in Them. Cowbridge Record Society. 1 November 1999. ISBN 978-0-9537029-0-9.
- Cobb, Peter Graham (1 June 2001). At Cowbridge Grammar School 1949-1966. Cowbridge Record Society. ISBN 978-0-9537029-1-6.
- Davies, Iolo (1 January 1989). A Certaine Schoole: A History of Cowbridge Grammar School. State Mutual Book & Periodical Service, Limited. ISBN 978-0-7855-6869-8.
- Leijerstam, Adrianne (1 April 1992). Aspects of Cowbridge. Profile. ISBN 978-0-9519213-0-2.
- Parkhouse, J.; Evans, Edith (1996). Excavations in Cowbridge, South Glamorgan, 1977-88. Cadw, Tempus Reparatum. ISBN 978-0-86054-819-5.
- Robinson, David M. (1980). Cowbridge: The Archeology and Topography of a Small Market Town in the Vale of Glamorgan. Glamorgan-Gwent Archeological Trust. ISBN 978-0-9506950-1-3.

== Dinas Powys ==
- Alcock, Leslie; Studies, University of Wales. Board of Celtic (1963). Dinas Powys: an Iron Age, Dark Age, and medieval settlement in Glamorgan. University of Wales Press.
- Pierce, Gwynedd Owen; Studies, University of Wales. Board of Celtic (1968). The Place-Names of Dinas Powys Hundred. Published on behalf of the Board of Celtic Studies of the University of Wales [by] University of Wales P.
- Tilney, Chrystal (1982). Glimpses of Old Dinas Powys. Starling Press. ISBN 978-0-903434-49-2.
- Tilney, Chrystal (1 September 2010). Dinas Powys from Old Photographs. Amberley Publishing. ISBN 978-1-4456-0164-9.

== Llanharry ==
- Williams, Mervyn (1958). Geology and Mineralisation of the Llanharry Hematite Deposits, South Wales. University of London.

== Llantwit Major ==
- Denning, Roy (1 February 1986). Llantwit Major in Old Picture Postcards. European Library, The Netherlands. ISBN 978-90-288-3349-4.
- Fryer, Alfred C. (28 February 2008). Llantwit Major, a Fifth Century University. Read Books. ISBN 978-1-4086-8476-4.
- Llantwit Major in Camera. D. Brown. 1979.

== Penarth and Sully ==
- Ings, D.G. (1 August 1990). Penarth 2. European Library, The Netherlands. ISBN 978-90-288-4911-2.
- Ings, David (1 October 2009). Penarth Through Time. Amberley Publishing Local. ISBN 978-1-84868-746-2.
- Isaacs, Mark (June 2005). Around Penarth. Francis Frith Collection. ISBN 978-1-84589-020-9.
- Jones, Glyn Meredith; Scourfield, Elfyn (1986). Sully: A Village and Parish in the Vale of Glamorgan. Glyn M. Jones. ISBN 978-0-9511155-0-3.
- North, Geoffrey A. (30 April 1998). Penarth and Sully. History Press. ISBN 978-0-7524-0613-8.
- Thomas, Barry A. (1997). Penarth: The Garden by the Sea. B. A. Thomas. ISBN 978-0-9532197-0-4.
- Thorne, Roy (1 January 1975). Penarth: A History. The Starling Press Ltd. ISBN 978-0-903434-04-1.

== St Donats ==
- Basic, Rozmeri; Wortman, Robert (2003). St. Donat and Alcuin's acrostics: case studies in Carolingian modulation. Kim Williams Books. ISBN 978-88-88479-02-6.
- Blackburn, Esther; Williams, Rita (1975). St. Donat's Castle: A Guide and Brief History.
- Clark, George Thomas (1871). Thireteen views of the Castle of St. Donat's, Glamorganshire. Adnitt & Naunton.
- Denning, R. T. W.; Hilling, John Bryan (1 January 1983). The Story of St. Donat's Castle & Atlantic College. D Brown & Sons, Limited. ISBN 978-0-905928-26-5.

== Wenvoe ==
- Moody, Ian; Coles, Gareth; Davis, Roger B.; Williams, Alan (2000). Wenvoe Past & Present: Local History and Descriptive Walks Around the Village and Surrounding Area. Gwenfô Gynt - The Wenvoe History Group. ISBN 978-0-9539231-0-6.
- Moody, Ian; Jones, Stephen K. (1 January 2004). Wenvoe and Twyn-Yr-Odyn. Tempus. ISBN 978-0-7524-2934-2.
- Trevelyan, Marie (1 January 1973). Folk-Lore and Folk-Stories of Wales. Kessinger Publishing. p. 296. ISBN 978-0-85409-938-2.
