= Martin Luther bibliography =

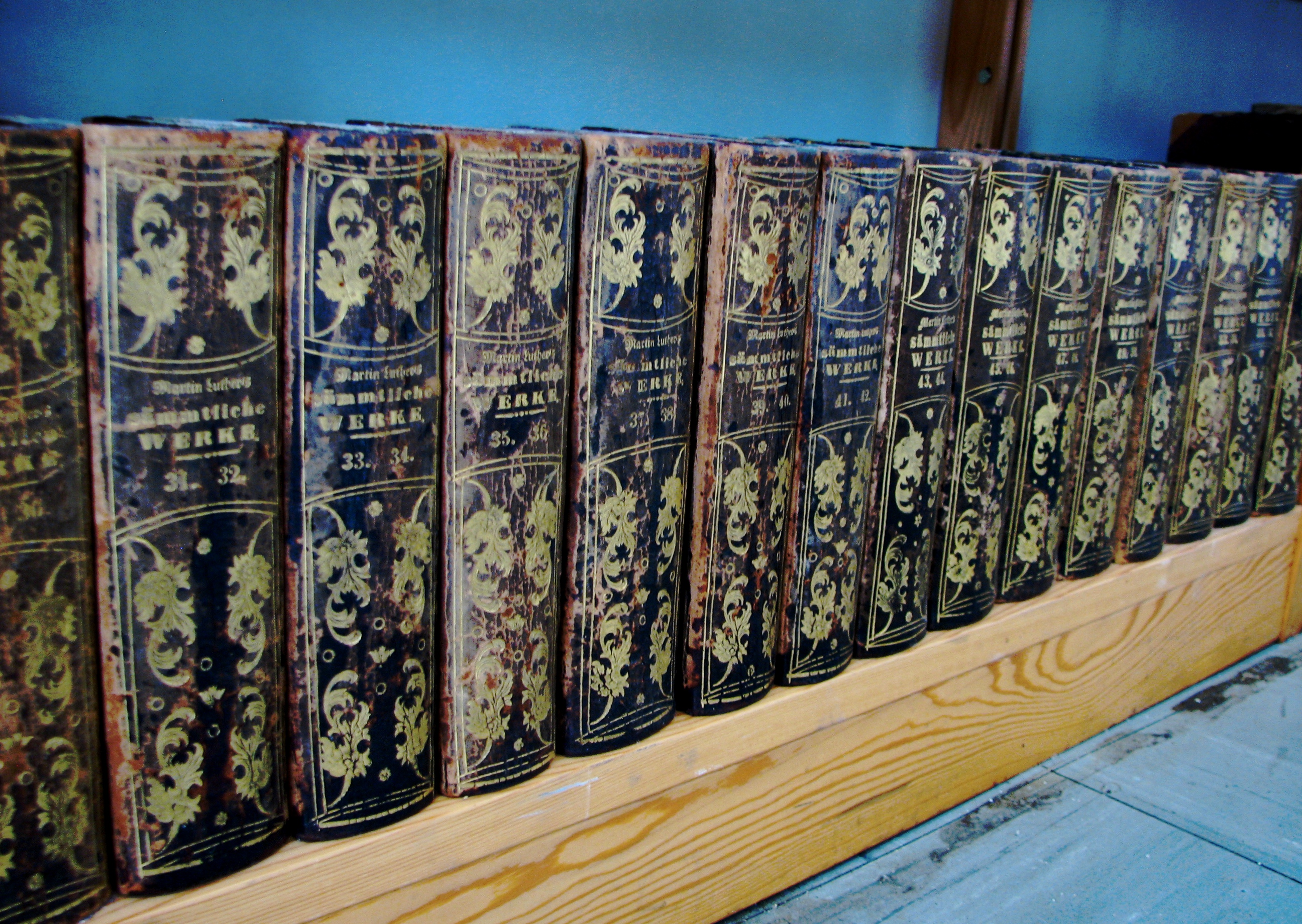
Volumes from a set of Luthers Works in German

This list of books by Martin Luther contains a bibliography of the works of Martin Luther in print, online or other formats, in English translation and original language. Martin Luther resisted the publication of a combined edition of his works for multiple reasons, although he finally consented to write a preface to such a publication in 1539.

== Catalog ==
Chronological catalog of Luther's life events, letters, and works with citations, 478 pages, 5.45 MB

- LettersLuther4.doc

== Collected works ==
=== Original languages ===
The critical complete edition of Luther's works is D. Martin Luthers Werke: kritische Gesammtausgabe, also known as Weimarer Ausgabe or the "Weimar Edition" in English. It was begun in 1883 and completed in 2009 with 121 volumes.

=== English ===
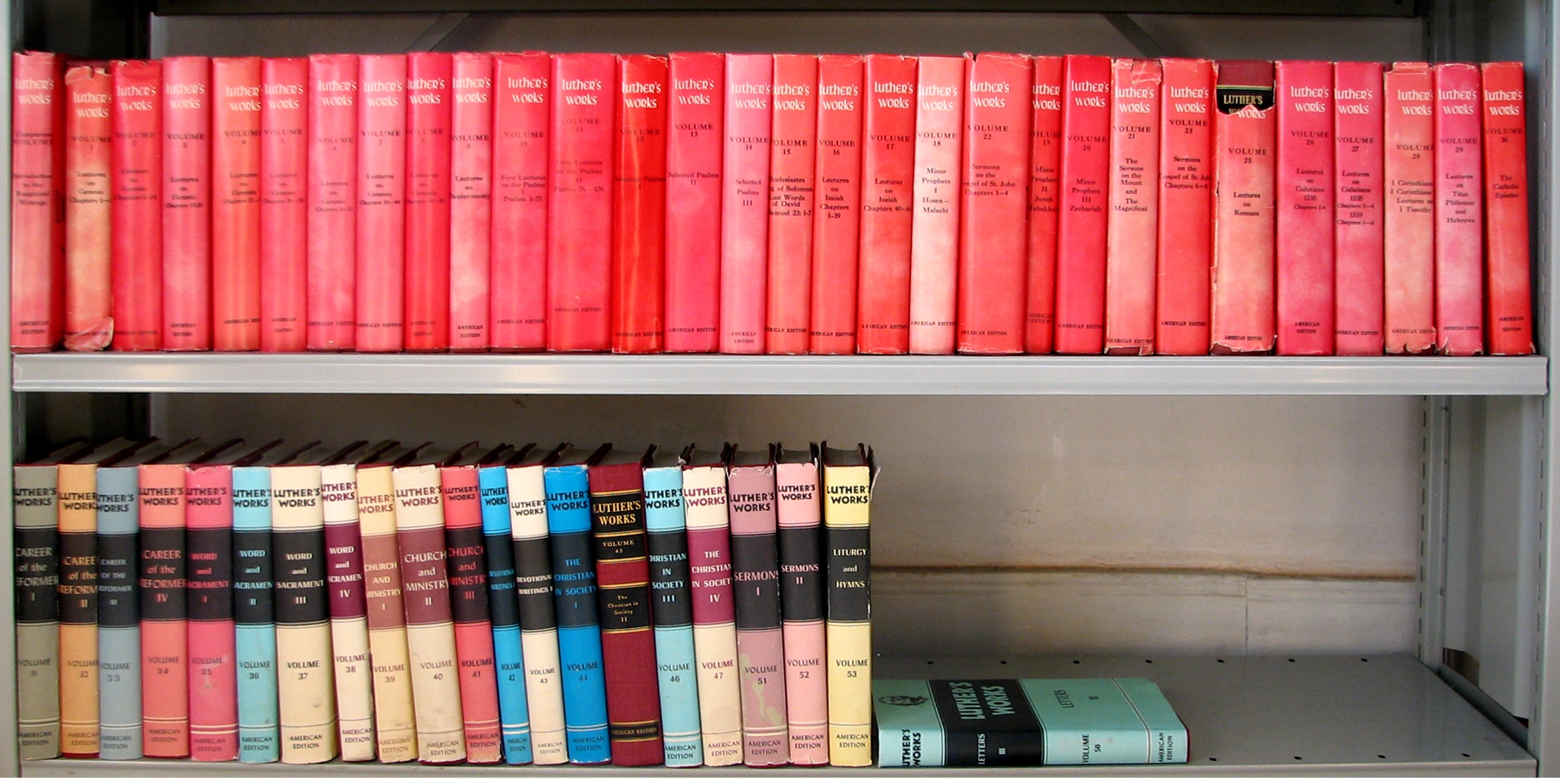
Luther's works in English

1. Luther, Martin. Luther's Works. 55 Volumes. Various translators. Minneapolis: Fortress Press; St. Louis: Concordia Publishing House, 1957-1986.
  - Luther's Works Companion Volume Luther The Expositor
  - Vol. 1 Lectures on Genesis Chapters 1-5
  - Vol. 3 Lectures on Genesis Chapters 15-20
  - Vol. 9. Lectures on Deuteronomy
  - Vol. 12 Selected Psalms
  - Vol. 13 Selected Psalms II
  - Vol. 31 Career of Reformer
  - Vol. 36 Word and Sacrament II
  - Vol. 40 Church and Ministry II
  - Vol. 51 Sermons I
2. Luther, Martin. Select works Vol. II, tr. Henry Cole. London: W. Simkin and R. Marshall, 1826.
3. Luther, Martin. Select works Vol. III, tr. Henry Cole. London: W. Simkin and R. Marshall, 1826.
4. Luther, Martin. Martin Luther's Writings (Largest Online English Luther Library)

== Collected works by type ==
=== Luther's German Bible translation ===
1. Luther, Martin. D. Martin Luthers Werke, Kritische Gesamtausgabe. Die Deutsche Bibel. 12 vols. Weimar: Verlag Hermann Böhlaus Nochfolger, 1906-61.
2. Die Luther-Bibel von 1534. Kolorierte Faksimileausgabe, 2 Bände und Begleitband (v. Stephan Füssel), Taschen Verlag, 2002 (Rezension und einige schöne Auszüge)
3. Biblia Germanica. Luther-Übersetzung 1545, Ausgabe letzter Hand. Faksimilierte Handausgabe nach dem im Besitz der Deutschen Bibelgesellschaft befindlichen Originaldruck; einspaltig. Mit zahlreichen Initialen und Holzschnitten des Meisters MS, an deren Gestaltung Luther selbst mitgewirkt hat. Deutsche Bibelgesellschaft, 1967. ISBN 3-438-05501-5
4. D. Martin Luther. Die gantze Heilige Schrifft. Der komplette Originaltext von 1545 in modernem Schriftbild. Hrsg. von Hans Volz unter Mitarbeit von Heinz Blanke; Textredaktion Friedrich Kur. Rogner & Bernhard, München 1972 (Neuausgabe: Ed. Lempertz, Bonn 2004), ISBN 3-933070-56-2
5. Die Luther-Bibel. Originalausgabe 1545 und revidierte Fassung 1912 (CD-ROM), Digitale Bibliothek 29, Berlin 2002, ISBN 3-89853-129-5 (Es handelt sich um Luthers frühneuhochdeutschen Text.)
- Wikisource Lutherbibel
- Die Bibel (lateinisch/deutsch)
- Luthers Biblia 1545
- Audio Bibel in der Lutherübersetzung zum Download
- Lutherbibel von 1984
- "Text der Lutherbibel von 1912". spiegel.de. Archived from the original on June 17, 2002.
- Lutherdeutsch.de

=== Letters ===
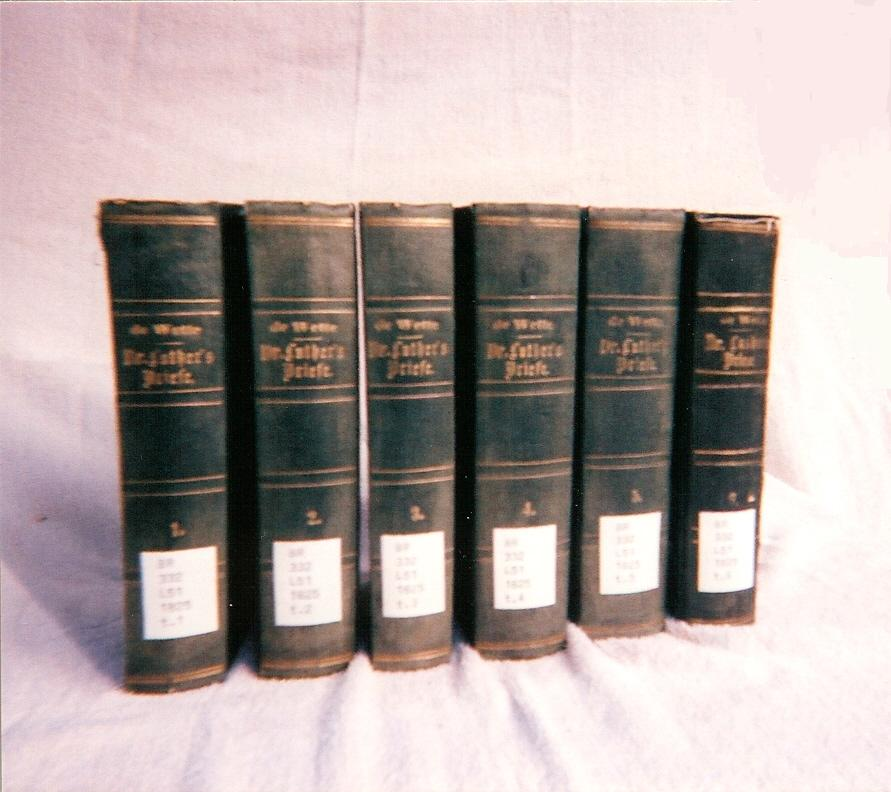
Set of Luther's letters

==== Original languages ====
1. Luther, Martin. D. Martin Luthers Werke, Kritische Gesamtausgabe. Briefwechsel. 18 vols. Weimar: Verlag Hermann Böhlaus Nachfolger, 1930-85.
2. Luther, Martin. Dr. Martin Luthers Sämmtliche Werke. Briefwechsel. Ed. Ernst Ludwig Enders. Calw and Stuttgart.
  - Luther, Martin. Dr. Martin Luthers Sämmtliche Werke. Briefwechsel, Bierter Band. Ed. Ernst Ludwig Enders. Calw and Stuttgart, 1891.
  - Luther, Martin. Dr. Martin Luthers Sämmtliche Werke. Briefwechsel Fünster Band. Ed. Ernst Ludwig Enders. Calw and Stuttgart, 1893.
  - Luther, Martin. Dr. Martin Luthers Sämmtliche Werke. Briefwechsel, Sechster Band. Ed. Ernst Ludwig Enders. Calw and Stuttgart, 1895.
  - Luther, Martin. Dr. Martin Luthers Sämmtliche Werke. Briefwechsel, Achter Band. Ed. Ernst Ludwig Enders. Calw and Stuttgart, 1898.
  - Luther, Martin. Dr. Martin Luthers Sämmtliche Werke. Briefwechsel, Echutee Band. Ed. Ernst Ludwig Enders. Calw and Stuttgart, 1903.

==== English ====
1. Luther, Martin. Luther's Correspondence and Other Contemporary Letters, 2 vols., tr.and ed. by Preserved Smith, Charles Michael Jacobs, The Lutheran Publication Society, Philadelphia, Pa. 1913, 1918. Vol. 1 (1507-1521) and Vol. 2 (1521-1530) from Google Books. Reprint of Vol. 1, Wipf & Stock Publishers (March 2006). ISBN 1-59752-601-0
2. Luther, Martin. The Letters of Martin Luther, tr. Margaret, A. Currie. London: Macmillan, 1908.
3. Luther, Martin. Luther's Letters to Women, ed. K. Zimmermann, tr. Malcolm. London: Chapman and Hall, 1865.
4. Luther, Martin. A Simple Rite for the Ministry of a Pastor with a Demonically-Afflicted Person (Letter to Severin Schulze, June 1, 1545) from Luther: Letters of Spiritual Counsel. Philadelphia: The Westminster Press, 1960, p. 52.)

=== Commentaries ===
1. Luther, Martin. A manual of the Book of psalms: Or, The Subject-contents of All the Psalms , tr. Henry Cole. London: R.B. Seeley and W. Burnside, 1837.
2. Luther, Martin. Commentary on the Epistle to the Galatians, tr. Theodore Graebner. Grand Rapids, Michigan: Zondervan Publishing House, 1949.

=== Sermons ===
1. Luther, Martin. A Selection of the Most Celebrated Sermons of Martin Luther, ed. K. Zimmermann, tr. Malcolm. New York: S. & D. A. Forbes, 1830

=== Biography ===
1. Luther, Martin. The Life of Luther Written by Himself, ed. M. Michelet. tr. William Hazlitt. London: George Bell and Sons, 1904.

=== Music ===
1. Luther, Martin, Luther: Hymns, Ballads, Chants, Truth. 4 CD recording. St. Louis: Concordia Publishing House, 2005.
2. Luther, Martin. Martin Luther's Spiritual Songs, tr. Richard Massie. Chester: Hatchard & Son, 1854.
3. Luther, Martin. The Hymns of Martin Luther: Set to their original melodies; with an English version. ed. Bacon, Leonard Woolsey and Allen, Nathan H. Publisher unknown, Year published, unknown.

=== Table talk ===
1. Luther, Martin. D. Martin Luthers Werke, Kritische Gesamtausgabe. Tischreden. 6 vols. Weimar: Verlag Hermann Böhlaus Nochfolger, 1912-21.
2. Luther, Martin. Luther's table talk; or, Some choice fragments from the familiar discourse of that godly man. ed. & trans. Charles Heel et al. London: A. & R. Spottiswoode. 1832
3. Luther's Table Talk: A Critical Study. New York: Columbia University Press, 1907. ISBN 0-7905-3865-2 from Google Books
4. Luther, Martin. Table Talk. London: Religious Tract Society. 18-?.

== Pamphlet ==
1. Passional Christi und Antichristi. Rhau-Grunenberg, Dec 21, 1521, woodcuts by Lucas Cranach the Elder (Original language)

== Large Catechism ==
1. "The Large Catechism." Concordia: The Lutheran Confessions: A Reader's Edition of the Book of Concord. Tr. W. H. T. Dau and G. F. Bente. Rev. and Updated by P. T. McCain, R. C. Baker, G. E. Veith and E. A. Engelbrecht. St. Louis: Concordia Publishing House, 2005, 375-470.
2. Triglot Concordia. tr. and ed. F. Bente and W. H.T. Dau. St. Louis: Concordia Publishing House, 1921.

== Smalcald Articles ==
1. "The Smalcald Articles." Concordia: The Lutheran Confessions: A Reader's Edition of the Book of Concord. Tr. W. H. T. Dau and G. F. Bente. Rev. and Updated by P. T. McCain, R. C. Baker, G. E. Veith and E. A. Engelbrecht. St. Louis: Concordia Publishing House, 2005, 279-313.
2. Triglot Concordia. Tr. and ed. W. H. T. Dau and G. F. Bente. St. Louis: Concordia Publishing House, 1921.

== Small Catechism ==
1. "Enchiridion: The Small Catechism." Concordia: The Lutheran Confessions: A Reader's Edition of the Book of Concord. Tr. W. H. T. Dau and G. F. Bente. Rev. and Updated by P. T. McCain, R. C. Baker, G. E. Veith and E. A. Engelbrecht. St. Louis: Concordia Publishing House, 2005, 333-374.
2. Triglot Concordia. tr. and ed. F. Bente and W. H.T. Dau. St. Louis: Concordia Publishing House, 1921.

== See also ==
- Resources about Martin Luther
