= Bibliography of encyclopedias: aviation =

This is a list of encyclopedias and encyclopedic/biographical dictionaries published on the subject of aviation and aviators in any language. Entries are in the English language unless specifically stated as otherwise.

- Beaver, Paul (1986). The Encyclopedia of Aviation. Octopus. ISBN 978-0-7064-2559-8.
- Bristow, Gary V. (25 September 2002). Encyclopedia of Technical Aviation. McGraw-Hill. ISBN 978-0-07-140213-2.
- Carlisle, Norman V; Neville, Leslie E; Cleveland, Reginald M (17 March 2012). The Illustrated Aviation Encyclopedia. Literary Licensing, LLC. ISBN 978-1-258-23286-3.
- Gunston, Bill (25 May 2000). The Osprey Encyclopedia of Russian aircraft. Osprey Pub. ISBN 9781841760964.
- Gunston, Bill (30 November 2005). World Encyclopedia of Aircraft Manufacturers: From the Pioneers to the Present Day. History Press. ISBN 978-0-7509-3981-2.
- Jackson, Robert (1 January 2004). The Encyclopedia of Military Aircraft. Parragon. ISBN 978-1-4054-2465-3.
- Jackson, Robert (November 2004). The encyclopedia of aircraft: over 3,000 military and civil aircraft from the Wright flyer to the Stealth bomber. Thunder Bay Press. ISBN 978-1-59223-257-4.
- Federal Aviation Administration (1 May 2007). Pilot's Encyclopedia of Aeronautical Knowledge. Skyhorse Publishing Inc. ISBN 978-1-60239-034-8.
- The Illustrated Encyclopedia of Aviation and Space: A - Apo. A.F.E.Pr. 1971.
- Mondey, David (1 September 1988). The International Encyclopedia of Aviation. Random House Value Publishing. ISBN 978-0-517-66199-4.
- Robinson, Anthony (1979). The Illustrated Encyclopedia of Aviation. Marshall Cavendish Corp. ISBN 9780856853180.
- Taylor, Michael John Haddrick; Gunston, Bill (1 December 1993). Jane's Encyclopedia of Aviation. Crescent Books. ISBN 978-0-517-10316-6.
- Taylor, Michael John Haddrick; Taylor, John William Ransom (1978). Encyclopedia of Aircraft. Putnam. ISBN 9780399122170.
- Welch, Rosanne (December 1998). Encyclopedia of women in aviation and space. ABC-CLIO. ISBN 978-0-87436-958-8.
- Winchester, Jim (29 July 2006). The Encyclopedia of Modern Aircraft: From Civilian Airliners to Military Superfighters. Thunder Bay Press. ISBN 978-1-59223-628-2.

== See also ==
- Bibliography of encyclopedias
