= Bibliography of tourism =

This is a bibliography of works related the subject of tourism.

Tourism is travel for recreational, leisure or business purposes. The World Tourism Organization defines tourists as people "traveling to and staying in places outside their usual environment for not more than one consecutive year for leisure, business and other purposes".

== Dictionaries ==
- Dictionary of Travel, Tourism and Hospitality, S. Medik, ed. Butterworth, 2003
- A Dictionary of Travel and Tourism Terminology, A. Beaver. CABI, 2005
- The Tourism Society's Dictionary for Tourism Industry, V. Reily Collins, ed. CABI, 2008

== Encyclopedias ==
- Encyclopedia of Leisure and Outdoor Recreation, J. Jenkins and J. Pigram, eds. Routledge, 2003
- International Encyclopedia of Hospitality Management, A. Pizam, ed. Elsevier, 2005
- Encyclopedia of Social and Cultural Anthropology, A. Barnard and J. Spencer, eds. Routledge, 2012

== Research methods ==
- Altinay L & Paraskevas A (2008) Planning research in hospitality and tourism (Butterworth-Heinemann)
- Brotherton, B. (2008) Researching Hospitality and Tourism: A Student Guide (Sage Publications),
- Hsu, Cathy H.C. and William C Gartner, eds. The Routledge handbook of tourism research (2012) excerpt.
- Jennings, G. (2006) Tourism Research (John Wiley & Sons, Australia).,
- Veal, A. J, (2006) Research Methods for Leisure and Tourism: A Practical Guide, 3rd ed (Prentice Hall),
- Smith, S. (2010) Practical Tourism Research (CABI).
- Cudny, W., Gosik, B., Piech, M., Rouba, R. (2011) Praca dyplomowa z turystyki podręcznik akademicki (The rules of writing master's thesis in tourism), LTN, Lodz.

== Tourism and technology ==
- Fesenmaier, D., Werthner, H., Wober, K, 2006, Destination Recommendation Systems: Behavioural Foundations and Applications HB 0851990231, CABI, London.
- Frew A., O'Connor P, Hitz M.(Eds), 2003, Information and Communication Technologies in Tourism, Springer-Verlag Vienna ISBN 3-211-83910-0
- Frew A., (Editor) 2004, Information and Communication Technologies in Tourism 2004, Springer-Verlag Vienna ISBN 3-211-20669-8
- Frew A., (Editor) 2005, Information and Communication Technologies in Tourism: Proceedings of the International Conference in Innsbruck, Austria, Springer-Verlag Vienna ISBN 3-211-24148-5
- Laudon, K., 2004, E-Commerce: Business. Technology. Society.: Case Book Update, Prentice Hall, ISBN 0-321-26937-3
- Lawrence, E., Newton, S., Corbitt, B., Braithwaite, R., Parker, C., 2002, Technology of internet business, Wiley, Australia.
- Marcussen, Carl H. 2006, Internet and Distribution of European Travel Updates, Centre for Regional and Tourism Research, Denmark https://web.archive.org/web/20110126112719/http://www.crt.dk/uk/staff/chm/P_CHM.htm
- Mills, M. and Rob Law (Editors), 2005, Handbook of Consumer Behaviour, Tourism and the Internet Haworth Press Inc., U.S. ISBN 0-7890-2599-X
- Nyheim, P., McFadden, F., Connolly, D., 2005, Technology strategies for the hospitality industry, Pearson-Prentice Hall, New Jersey.
- Wöber, K.W. A.J. Frew M. Hitz (Editors) 2002, Information and Communication Technologies in Tourism 2002:Springer-Verlag Vienna ISBN 3-211-83780-9

== History of tourism ==
- Battilani, Patrizia, et al. "Discussion: teaching tourism history." Journal of Tourism History 8.1 (2016): 57–84.
- Boyer, M. Histoire de l'invention du tourisme. La Tour d'Aigues (2000).
- Culver, Lawrence. The Frontier of Leisure: Southern California And The Shaping Of Modern America (2012).
- Endy, Christopher. Cold War Holidays (2004).
- Foubert, Lien. "Men and women tourists’ desire to see the world: ‘curiosity’ and ‘a longing to learn’ as (self-) fashioning motifs (first–fifth centuries CE)." Journal of Tourism History 10.1 (2018): 5-20. online
- Ghodsee, Kristen R. The Red Riviera: Gender, Tourism and Postsocialism on the Black Sea (Duke University Press, 2005).
- Gyr, Ueli. "The history of tourism: structures on the path to modernity." Notes 2.8 (2010). online
- Law, Michael John. Not Like Home: American Visitors to Britain in the 1950s (McGill-Queen's University Press, 2019) online review.
- Merrill, Dennis. Negotiating Paradise (2009), post 1945.
- Newman, Harvey K. Southern hospitality: Tourism and the growth of Atlanta (1999).
- Polat, Hasan Ali, and Aytuğ Arslan. "The rise of popular tourism in the Holy Land: Thomas Cook and John Mason Cook's enterprise skills that shaped the travel industry." Tourism Management 75 (2019): 231–244.
- Reynolds, Daniel P. Postcards from Auschwitz: Holocaust tourism and the meaning of remembrance (NYU Press, 2018).
- Rice, Mark. Making Machu Picchu: The Politics of Tourism in Twentieth-Century Peru (UNC Press Books, 2018).
- Towner, John. "The grand tour: A key phase in the history of tourism." Annals of tourism research 12.3 (1985): 297–333.
- Vukonic, Boris. "An outline of the history of tourism theory." in The Routledge handbook of tourism research ed. Cathy Hsu (2012).
- Weir, Brian. "Climate change and tourism–Are we forgetting lessons from the past?." Journal of Hospitality and Tourism Management 32 (2017): 108–114.
- Zuelow, Eric. A history of modern tourism (Macmillan International Higher Education, 2015).
