= Bibliography of works on Adolfas Mekas =

This is a bibliography of works and articles that have been published about Adolfas Mekas and his career in film and teaching, and that have been used as references in his page.

== Books ==
- "Hallelujah les Collines" Fiche Filmographique No. 229 Paris (Special Issue)
- "Hallelujah les Collines" l'Avant-Scene No. 64. Novembre 1966 Paris. (Special Issue ‚ screenplay in French)
- "Jeune Cinema Americain" par Paul & Jean-Louis Leutrat pp 40‚ 48 & other references. Premier Plan, Paris‚ 1967
- "Who is Who in America" Entry. 1969
- "The Scene" by Calvin Tompkins pp. 164‚ 169, 171, 173, 176, 182, 186, The Viking Press 1970
- "Experimental Cinema" by David Curtis p. 135 Universe Books 1971
- "Movie Journal" by Jonas Mekas pp. 149, 170, 192; 67‚ 69. 121, 326, The Macmillan Co. 1972
- School of Visual Arts. School of Visual Arts Course Catalogue. New York: Visual Arts, 1974–75. Print
- "Film‚ An Introduction" by John L. Fell pp. 7, 237. Praeger Publishers 1975
- "The Oxford Companion to Film" edited by Liz-Anne Bawden p. 459 Oxford University Press 1976
- "Film Culture Reader" edited by P. Adams Sitney pp. 71, 80, 317, 319‚320 Praeger Publishers 1970
- "Encyclopedia of Film" by Roger Manvell pp. 56, 96, 359 Crown 1970
- "Lost, Lost, Lost" edited by Pip Chodorov and Elodie Imbeau with Christian Lebrat pp 20, 36, 44, 49, 54, 55, 56, 57, 59, 61, 62, 67, 68, 73, 74, 82 Editions Paris Experimental 2000
- "Green Mountain Cinema 1" Created and Edited by Stephen R. Bissette A Black Coat Press Book, 2004; pp 14, 50, 53, 54
- Lithuanian Film Directors. Memphis, TN: LLC, 2010. Print

== Periodicals ==
- "A Foolish Genius: The Life and Work of Adolfas Mekas" by Philippe Dijon de Monteton. http://www.experimentalconversations.com/articles/969/a-foolish-genius
- "Girl Tree" (Talk of the Town) The New Yorker, 8 December 1962, New York
- "Hallelujah the Hills" by Harriet R. Polt, Film Quarterly Fall, 1963, Vol. XVII, No. 1, Los Angeles
- "Hallelujah the Hills" by Gene Moskowitz, Variety, 15 May 1963, New York
- "Hallelujah the Hills" by Robert Benayoun La Cinematographie Fran√ßaise, 18 mai 1963, Paris
- "Cannes, " by Richard Roud The Guardian, 30 May 1963, London
- "Hallelujah the Hills," by Marcel Martin, Cinema 63 No. 77, Juin 1963, Paris
- "A Funny and Lyrical American Film" by Richard Roud, Manchester Guardian Weekly, 5 June 1963, Paris
- "Hallelujah the Hills La Comica Finale" by Ugo Casiraghi, La Fiera del Cinema, July 1963, Roma
- "Hallelujah: l'avant-garde loufoque" by Robert Benayoun, France Observateur, 11/7/63
- "Hallelujah the Hills" Festival, 23 Juglio 1963, Locarno
- "Pomeriggio per il Nuovo Mondo" by Giuseppe Curonici Giornale del Popolo, 24/7/63, Lugano
- "Hallelujah the Hills, Una Spassosa Galoppata nel Regno dell' Assurdo," Corriere del Ticino, 25 luglio 1963, Lugano.
- "Poesie et Burlesque" by Francois Rochat, Gazette de Lausanne, 27/28 juillet 1963
- "Hallelujah the Hills" by Michael F. Feiner, The Montreal Star, 5 August '63, Montreal
- "Ein Rueckblick" Neue Z√ºrcher Zeitung Fernausgabe No. 216, Blatt 8., 8/8/63, Zurich
- "Experimentation and Entertainment" by Carol Brightman, Long Island Press, October 1963
- "Le prince et le barbouill√©" par Gerald Godin Le Nouvelliste, 8 October 1963, Trois-Rivires
- "Adolfo Meko Aleliuja kalnams" by R. Vastokas Teviskes Ziburiai, 10 October 1963
- "Protest und Anklage abseits der hohlen Traumfabrik" by Wolfgang Moser, 19-20/10/63, Mannheimer Morgen
- "Hallelujah les Collines," Combat, 26/27 Oct 1963, Paris
- "Hallelujah: Les 'Dingues' au Cinema" by Guy Allombert Arts, 30 October 1963, Paris
- "Hallelujah the Hills" Film Culture, Winter 1963/64, New York
- "Une Improvisation loufoque et tendre" by Armand Monjo L'Humanite, 11/11/63, Paris
- "Du Burlesque en Libert√©" by Pierre Marcabru Arts, 13 November 1963, Paris
- "Hallelujah les Collines" by Claude Mauriac Le Figaro Littoraire, 14 November 1963, Paris
- "Hallelujah les Collines" by Jeander, Liberation, 14 Nov 1963, Paris
- "Hallelujah les Collines" by Pierre Mazars, Le Figaro, 15 Nov 1963, Paris
- "Jack et Leo" by Claude Tarare, Paris Express, 21 November 1963, Paris
- "Hallelujah the Hills" by Jean d'Yvoire, Telerama No. 723, 24 November 1963, Paris
- "Hallelujah the Hills" by Andrew Sarris, Village Voice, Dec 1963, New York
- "Meku filmo premjera" Vienybe, 6 Dec 1963, New York
- "Hallelujah the Hills" Daily Telegraph, 12 December 1963, London
- "Where the Hell Are We?" Time, Vol. 82 No. 24, 13 December 1963, New York
- "Lietuviu filmininku laimejimas" Draugas, 14 December 1963, Chicago
- "Hallelujah the Hills directed by Adolfas Mekas" Yale Daily News, 16 December 1963, New Haven
- "Hallelujah the Hills" New York Journal American, 17 December 1963
- "Hallelujah the Hills" The Times, 19 December 1963, London
- "Foofs, Spoofs are Far Out and Big" Life, 20 December 1963, New York
- "Hallelujah the Hills" by Brendan Gill, The New Yorker, 21 December 1963
- "The Art Film" by Penelope Gilliatt The Observer, 22 December 1963, London
- "Castrated Cinema" by Charles Sterling, Village Voice, 26 December 1963, New York
- "Hallelujah the Hills" by Ronald Gold Motion Picture Daily, 27 December 1963, New York
- "Une divine idiotie" by Michel Aubriant, Paris-Presse l'Intransigeant, 11/13/63, Paris
- "Hallelujah the Hills at 5th Avenue Cinema" by Archer Winsten, NY Post, 12/17/63
- "Hallelujah the Hills Will Take Some Deciphering" Morning Telegram, 12/18/63, New York
- "Adolfas Mekas; Mon film est un chant d'amiti√©" La Cinematographic Francaise, 5/20/63, Paris
- "Apie broliu Meku filma 'Hallelujah the Hills" Ns. Laisve, 12/20/63, New York
- "Adolfas Mekas and the Movies" by Richard Christiansen Chicago Sun-Times, 1964
- "Une divine idiotie, un maussade omnibus..." by Alain Pontaut La Presse, Jan.'64, Montreal
- "Towards Incest" by Danis Berger Village Voice, 2 January 1964, New York
- "Laiskai in New Yorko" by Stasys Gostautas Draugas, 4 January 1964, Chicago
- "Aleluja u brdima" Filmska Kultura, Feb 1964, Broj. 38, Zagreb
- "Hallelujah the Hills" by Paul Breslow Vogue, 15 February 1964, New York
- "Pasisekimas atejo per viena diena" by k.b. Draugas, 22 February 1964, Chicago
- "The Surest Sigh of Spring" by Eleanor Keen Chicago Sun-Times, 23 February 1964
- "Hallelujah! It's Great Fun!" by Richard Christiansen Chicago Daily News, 26 February 1964
- "Screwball Stuff" by Hollis Alpert Saturday Review, 29 February 1964, New York
- "The American Film," by Gudrun Howarth The Seventh Art, Spring 1964
- "Fright Bill Booked at Cinema Theatre" by Hazel Flynn, Citizen-News, 5 March 1964
- "Wild, Weird, Wacky Film at Cinema" by John G. Houser, Los Angeles Herald-Examiner, 6 March 1964, Los Angeles
- "Nutty But Good Fun," Boston Traveler, 12 March 1964
- "Hallelujah is Hilarious" by Cynthia Van Hazinga College News, 19 March 1964, Wellesley
- "Zany New Comedy Spoofs Its Artistic Peers" by Anne Burnett, Northeastern News, 20 March 1964
- "Hallelujah the Hills" by McLaren Harris, Boston Herald, 27 March 1964
- "Hallelujah the Hills" by Robin Beat, Time & Tide. Vol. XI. No. 227, April 1964, London
- "Hallelujah, har filmar USA:s fribytare" by Lasse Bergstrom Expressen, 6 April 1964, Stockholm
- "Vermont Nonsense" San Francisco Chronicle, 22 April 1964
- "Hallelujah the Hills, Acclaimed as Wildest, Weirdest, Wooziest" by Charles Richardson, The Commuter, 23 April '64, Cleveland
- "Hallelujah the Hills Hilarious, Crazy Film" by Kevin Thomas, Los Angeles Times, 3/5/64
- "Goldstein" by Gene Moskowitz Variety, 6 May 1964, New York.
- "Hallelujah Gets Good Audience" by James Meade San Diego Union, 12 May 1964
- "Scotia Girl Scores in Art Theatre Film" by Robert Day Times-Union, 20 June 1964, Albany NY
- "Hallelujah the Hills " by Dwight Macdonald Esquire, Vol.LXII No. 1, July 1964
- "Hallelujah the Hills" by E.P. Filmkritik, August 1964, Munchen
- "Halleluja, broder!" Chaplin, Sept. 64, No. 48, Stockholm
- "Venetian Hits" by Penelope Gilliatt, The Observer Weekend Review, 6 September '64, London
- "Venice Applauds The Brig; Story of US Marine Prison" by Cynthia Grenier, Int. Herald Tribune, 9/9/64, Paris
- "Hope Canyon‚ But it's Just a Front!" Tribune-Democrat, 12 September 1964, Johnstown, PA
- "Rages and Outrages" by Archer Winsten, The New York Post, 21 September '64
- "Movie Lacks a Plot, but it's Lots of Fun" by William Leonard, Chicago Tribune, 3/10/64
- "Baker-Whitely Takes Off Make-up, But Memories Remain" by Thomas H. Russell, The Tribune-Democrat, 21 Oct '64, Johnstown, PA
- "Viennale der Heiterkeit" by Goswin Dorfler Die Furche, Dec. 1964, Wien
- "Hallelujah the Hills! All Fun, No Substance" by Peggy Doyle, Boston Record American, 3/12/64
- "Our Man is Disillusioned" by Thomas H. Russell The Tribune-Democrat, 9/12/64, Johnstown, PA
- "Peter Beard Leads Hallelujah Chorus" by Eli Flam, The Patriot Ledger, 3/13/64, Boston
- "Satire on Movies Full of Vitality by James Powers, The Hollywood Reporter, 2/21/64, Los Angeles.
- "A New Wave in Vermont" by Stanley Eichelbaum, San Francisco Examiner, 4/23/64
- "Hill Hidden in Big Fog, Critic Says" by W. Ward Marsh, The Plain Dealer, 4/24/64, Cleveland
- "Broken Images of Hallelujah the Hills" by Godfrey John, Christian Science Monitor, 3/25/64
- "Sound and Fury, Signifying Nothing" by Lois Palken, Tufts Weekly, 3/27/64, Medford MA
- "Nuevo Cine Americano en Knoekk-le-Zoute" by Raymond Borde, Nuestro Cine, No 38, 1965, Madrid
- "Que es el nuovo cine americano?" by Gretchen Weinberg, Tiempo del Cine, 3/65 Buenos Aires
- "Innovadores Norteamericanos del S√©ptimo Arte" Vision, 6 April 1965
- "La invasion de los extravagantes" Primera Plana, 3 August 1965, Buenos Aires
- "Swedes Dig Brig" Variety, 18 August '65, New York.
- "Double-Barreled Detective Story" by Gene Moskowitz, Variety, 8 September 1965, New York
- "Skyscraper" Variety, 22 September 1965, New York
- "Talk of the Town" The New Yorker, 9 October 1965
- "The Uses of Comic Imagination" by Richard Watts Jr., New York Post, 15 November 1965
- "It's a Musical" by Julius Novick, The Village Voice, 25 November 1965, New York
- "Rawness of Reality Animates Movie Version of The Brig" by Kevin Thomas, Los Angeles Times, 8/28/65
- "Hallelujah die Hugel" by Peter M. Ladiges, Filmkritik 1966
- "A Double-Barreled Misfire" by Sam Lesner, Chicago Daily News, 3 January 1966
- "No Barrel of Laughs Here" by Ann Marsters, Chicago's American, 4 January 1966
- "The DBDS" by Eleanor Keen, Chicago Sun-Times, 5 January 1966
- "Is the Spoof Era Ending?" by Eleanor Keen, Chicago Sun-Times, 9 January 1966
- "He Suffers if the Pay is Good" by Bob Ellison, Chicago Sun-Times, 16 January 1966
- "Goldstein" by Philippe Deference Cinema 66, Mars 1966, Paris
- "Un beau film au Grand Chapiteau" by E. Delalandre, Le Meridional, 8/3/66, Cassis, France
- "Brig Cruelty Beyond Belief" by Ann Guarino, The News, 20 April 1966, New York
- "Films" by Andrew Sarris The Village Voice, 21 April 1966, New York
- "The Current Cinema" by Brendan Gill The New Yorker, 23 April 1966, New York
- "The Brig" by F. William Howton, Film Society Review, May 1966
- "Scorpio Rising and The Brig" by Edward Lipton, The Film Daily, 13 July 1966, New York
- "Hallelujah les Collines" by Alain Strambi La Marseillaise, 1 August 1966, Marseille
- "Scorpio Rising, Brig Offer Study in Contrast" by Alton Cook, NY World-Telegraph & Sun, 4/20/66
- "Mekas' Western" by Y.B., Le Monde, 23/24 avril 1967, Paris
- "Mekas' Western" Combat, 16 avril 1967, Paris
- "Mekas' Western" by Eric Leguebe, Le Parisien Libere, 21 avril 1967, Paris
- "Mekas Western" by Pierre Mazars, Figaro, 3 May 1967, Paris
- "Le 7e Art Pan" by Guetapan Pan, 9 August 1967, Bruxelles
- "Windflowers" by Byro Variety, 21 February '68, New York
- "Protest Oder Resignation?" by M.A. Aufbau, 23 February '68, New York
- "Pitfalls to Film-making" by Frances Taylor, Long Island Press, 25 February 1968
- "Windflowers" by James Stoller The Village Voice, 29 February 1968, New York
- "Windflowers " by William Wolf, Cue, 2 March 1968, New York
- "Windflowers" by Marjorie Heins, Rat, 18 March 1968, New York
- "Goldstein: Avant-garde Picture Recalls Hallelujah" by Eugene Archer, New York Times, 5/8/68
- "Film-maker Mekas Here for Windflowers Debut" by William Blum, Cincinnati Enquirer, 2/13/68
- "Zany Movie Filmed in South Derry" by Judson Hall, The Brattleboro Daily Reformer, 1/18/68
- "Screen: The Death of a Draft Dodger" by Renata Adler, The New York Times, 2/23/68
- "The French-American Challenge Cup Races: Ski Ski!" by Esse Daily Variety, 24 January 1969, Los Angeles
- "Petit Journal du Cinema" by D.N., Cahiers du Cinéma, No 212, Mai 1969, Paris
- "Mekas' Windflowers a Pungent Lament" by Paul McKenna, The Montreal Star, 4/12/69
- "Adolfo Meko Filmas Pasiekia Montreali" by V.A.J., Nepriklausoma Lietuva, 4/20/69
- "Mekas: the Man from the Hills" by Dane Lanken, The Saturday Gazette, 4/26/69, Montreal
- "Companeras and Companeros" by Hans, Variety, 28 October 1970, New York
- "Companeras and Companeros" by Andrew Sarris, Village Voice, 3 Dec 1970, New York
- "Companeras and Companeros" by Archer Winsten, New York Post, 4 December 1970
- "Compa√±eras and Compa√±eros" by Irwin Silber, Guardian, 5 Dec 1970, New York
- "Mekas Film's Cuban Theme" by David Sterritt, Christian Science Monitor, 27 February 1971
- "New York Film Festival Report" Catholic Film Newsletter, 1972 New York
- "Home Movie as Homelessness" by Jonathan Rosenbaum, Village Voice, 11/2/72, New York
- "Lietuviski apmastymai Niujorke" by Almus Salcius, Laisve, 29 September 1972, New York
- "Going Home" by Nicholas Yanni, Hollywood Reporter, Oct. 1972, Los Angeles
- "Saga of Homecoming" by Vincent Canby, New York Times, 5 October 1972
- "Going Home" by Robe, Variety, 11 October 1972, New York
- "Von Nekes bis Mekas" by Brigitte Jeremias Frankfurter, Allgemeine Zeitung, 10/17/72
- "Notes on the NY Film Festival" by T.A. Gallagher, Changes, Nov. 1972
- "Film The Medium of Right Now" by Walter Borawski, Poughkeepsie Journal, 19 November 1972
- "Going Home" by D. L. De Spectator, 12 December 1972, Bruxelles
- "Going Home" by Georges Ade De Nieuwe, 12 December 1972, Bruxelles
- "Women as Props and Scenery" by Gail Rock, MS, Jan. 1973, New York
- "Going Home" by Calvin Tomkins, The New Yorker, 6 January 1973, New York
- "Kelione i Lietuva New Yorko filmu festivalyje" by Jonas Kisnis, Vienybe, 1/12/73, New York
- "Saint Adolfas" Lithuanian hipster directs lively film scene at Bard by Syd M., Woodstock Times, 3 October 1991
- "Twenty Years of the People's Film Front" by Gregory Giaccio, The Bard Observer, 12 February 1992, Annandale, NY
- "Bard's Film Program Celebrates 20 Years" by D.X. Barton, Gazette Advertiser, 13 February 1992, Red Hook, NY
- "American Independent Narrative Cinema of the 60's" by Gary Morris Bright Lights Journal, January 2000, http://brightlightsfilm.com/27/sixtiescinema1.php
- "Adolfas Mekas, People Film Dept" by Frances Sandiford, About Town, Fall 2009, Hudson Valley, NY
- "I woke up this morning to sad news..." by Hellin Kay, www.Champagne and Heels, 1 June 2011
- "Adieu, Adolfas" by Syd M Woodstock Times, 9 June 2011, Woodstock, NY
- "Wild at Heart" by Mikhail Horowitz, The Bardian, Bard College Fall 2011, Annandale NY
- On the Horizon "Movies Brother Act" by Andy Rementer, The New Yorker, 17 October 2011
- "See Beyond the Expected: Anthology Salutes Adolfas Mekas" by Tom McCormack, The L. Magazine, 19 October 2011, New York
- Anthology Film Archives "The Films of Adolfas Mekas" Time Out New York, 20/26 Oct 2011
- "Thoughts on the Adolfas Mekas Retrospective" by Daniel Guzman Cinespect, 22 October 2011, New York
- Alternatives and Revivals "Hallelujah The Hills" by Jay Hoberman, Village Voice, 26 Oct/Nov 2011
- "Hallelujah The Hills" by R.B., The New Yorker, 31 October 2011
- "Remembering the Masters" Spotlight, 16th IFFKerala, 9 December 2011
- "VISA TAI-NE SAPNAS" by Kestutis Sapoka, Kulturos barai 2012 p. 45‚48
- "The Many Lives of Adolfas Mekas" by Syd M Almanac Weekly, 13 December 2012, Woodstock
- "New Yawk New Wave" at Film Forum by David Fear TimeOut New York, January 2013 https://www.timeout.com/newyork/film/new-yawk-new-wave-at-film-forum
- "The Joy and Exuberance of Adolfas Mekas: Hallelujah the Hills" by Aaron Cutler The L Magazine, 23 January 2013, NY http://theLmagazine.com/newyork/the-joy-and-exuberance-of-adolfas-mekas-hallelujah-the-hills/Content?oid=2291682
- "Hallelujah the Hills" by R.B., The New Yorker, 24 January 2013
- Now Playing "Hallelujah the Hills" by R.B., The New Yorker, 28 January 2013
- "These Are The Words of Saint Tula" by George Dupont Bard Free Press, February 2013, Annandale NY
- http://www.explorehudsonvalley.com/2013/02/18/the-many-lives-of-adolfas-mekas/
- "Hallelujah the Hills, the Funniest Comedy You've Never Seen" by Nina Metz, Chicago Closeup, 6 February 2014, The Chicago Tribune
- "Six Shooters in Somerset: The Curious Tale of a Northeastern Western" by Ryan M. Sopich, Pennsylvania Heritage, Winter 2024

== Bard College Periodicals ==
- Bard College. "Film At Bard." St. Stephen's Alumni Magazine February (1973): 13. Print.
- "Anthro & Film Majors." St. Stephen's Alumni Magazine 18.3 (1975): 11. Print.
- Bard College. "First Session of MFA Program Completed." Bard College Bulletin 120.3 (1981): 4. Print.
- A Working Community of Artists: The Interdisciplinary Master of Fine Arts Summer Program. Annandale-on-Hudson: Bard College Milton Avery Graduate School of the Arts, 1982. Print.
- "Bard Students Begin Work on Comedy Film." Register Star [Annandale-on-Hudson] 17 Mar 1983: n. pag. Print.
- Bard College. "Distinctive Ways to Learn." Bard College Bulletin, April 123.2 (1984): 26. Print.
- Bard College. "Dedication Day." Perspectives 124.4(1985): 2. Print.
- "The Arts." Bard Perspectives Nov 125.2 (1985): 6‚7. Print.
- Bard College. "Summer Scholars on Campus, Milton Avery Graduate School of the Arts, Faculty/ Administration Notes." Bard College Bulletin Perspectives August 125.6 (1986): 11-12+. Print.
- Bard College Annual Report June 1987: 2. Print.
- Bard in Brief [Annandale] Jan. 1988: 5. Print.
- Bard College. The Master of Fine Arts Program, Annandale-on-Hudson: Bard College, 1989. Print.
- Bard College. The Master of Fine Arts Program.Annandale-on-Hudson: Bard College, 1990. Print.
- Bard in Brief [Annandale] Feb. 1990: 6. Print.
- Bard in Brief [Annandale] Nov. 1991: n. pag. Print.
- Bard College. "Faculty Notes." Annandale Winter132.1 (1992): 54. Print
- Bard in Brief [Annandale] Mar. 1992: 3. Print.
- Bard in Brief [Annandale] Aug. 1992: 6. Print.
- The Bardian [Annandale] Nov. 1996: 5. Print.
- Bard College. Biennial Report. Rep. Annandale-on-Hudson: Bard College, 2002‚2004. Print
- Bard College. "Hallelujah Adolfas!" Bardian (2004): 25. Print.
- Bard College. "Books by Bardians." Bardian Summer(2007): 44. Print.
- Bard College. "Faculty Notes." Bardian Spring(2008): 62. Print.
- Bard College. "Adolfas Mekas Lionized in Lithuania" Bardian Spring (2013): 27. Print.
- Bard College. "President's Awards Ceremony." Bardian Fall (2013): 21. Print.
