= Bibliography of encyclopedias: astronomy and astronomers =

This is a list of encyclopedias and encyclopedic/biographical dictionaries published on the subject of astronomy and astronomers in any language. Entries are in the English language except where noted.

== A ==
- Amils, Ricardo; Quintanilla, José Cernicharo; Cleaves, Henderson James (1 June 2011). Encyclopedia of Astrobiology. Springer. ISBN 978-3-642-11271-3.
- Angelo, Joseph A. (1 January 2009). Encyclopedia of Space and Astronomy. Infobase Publishing. ISBN 978-1-4381-1018-9.
- Angelo, Joseph A. Encyclopedia of space exploration. Facts on File, 2000. ISBN 0816039429.
- Angelo, Joseph A. The Extraterrestrial Encyclopedia: Our Search for Life in Outer Space. Facts on File, rev. ed., 1991.
- Angelo, Joseph A., Jr., Facts on File. The Facts on File space and astronomy handbook. Facts on File, 2002. ISBN 0816045429.
- Asimov, Isaac. Isaac Asimov's Library of the Universe. Gareth Stevens, 1988.

== B ==
- Baker, David. Larousse Guide to Astronomy. Larousse, 1978.
- Bakich, Michael E. (10 July 2003). The Cambridge Encyclopedia of Amateur Astronomy. Cambridge University Press. ISBN 978-0-521-81298-6.

== C ==
- Cambridge Encyclopedia of Astronomy. Crown, 1977.
- Clapham, Frances M.; Taylor, Ron B. (1982). Rand McNally astronomy encyclopedia. Children's Press. ISBN 978-0-516-09853-1.

== D ==
- Daintith, John; Gould, William (September 2006). Collins Dictionary of Astronomy. Collins. ISBN 978-0-00-722092-2.
- Daintith, John; Gould, William; Illingworth, Valerie (1 January 2009). The Facts on File Dictionary of Astronomy. Infobase Publishing. ISBN 978-1-4381-0932-9.

== E ==
- Encyclopedia of astronomy and astrophysics. Taylor & Francis. .

== G ==
- Gatland, Kenneth. Illustrated Encyclopedia of Space Technology. Crown, 2nd ed., 1990.
- Gore, John Ellard (September 2010). An Astronomical Glossary: Or Dictionary of Terms Used in Astronomy (1893). Kessinger Publishing. ISBN 978-1-166-44281-1.

== H ==
- Handbuch der Physik. Springer-Verlag, 1956–1988. ISSN 0085-140X.
- Hetherington, Norriss S. Encyclopedia of Cosmology: Historical, Philosophical, and Scientific Foundations of Modern Cosmology. Garland, 1993.
- Hockey, Thomas A., Virginia Trimble, Thomas R. Williams, Katherine Bracher, eds. Biographical Encyclopedia of Astronomers. Springer, 2007. ISBN 9780387310220.
- Hutton, Charles (1817). An astronomical dictionary: compiled from Hutton's Mathematical and philosophical dictionary: to which is prefixed an introduction containing a brief history of astronomy, and a familiar illustration of its elementary principles. Published and sold by Hezekiah Howe.

== I ==
- Illingworth, Valerie, John Owen, Edward Clark, Facts on File. The Facts on File dictionary of astronomy. Facts on File, 2000. ISBN 0816042837.
- Ince, Martin (2001). Dictionary of Astronomy. Peter Collin Publishing. ISBN 978-1-901659-72-6.

== K ==
- Kitchin, Christopher R. (2002). Illustrated Dictionary of Practical Astronomy. Springer. ISBN 978-1-85233-559-5.

== L ==
- Lang, Kenneth R. (19 June 2006). A Companion to Astronomy and Astrophysics: Chronology and Glossary with Data Tables. Springer. ISBN 978-0-387-30734-3.
- Lewis, Richard. Illustrated Encyclopedia of the Universe. Crown, 1983.
- Lusis, Andy. Astronomy and astronautics: An enthusiast's guide to books and periodicals. Facts on File, 1986. ISBN 072011795X.

== M ==
- Maran, Stephen P. The Astronomy and astrophysics encyclopedia. Van Nostrand Reinhold, 1992. ISBN 0442263643.
- Maran, Stephen P. (15 October 1991). The Astronomy and Astrophysics Encyclopedia. John Wiley & Sons. ISBN 978-0-471-28941-8.
- Mark, Hans. Encyclopedia of space science and technology. Wiley, 2003. ISBN 0471324086.
- Matzner, Richard A. Dictionary of geophysics, astrophysics, and astronomy. CRC Press, 2001. ISBN 0849328918.
- Meyers, Robert Allen (1989). Encyclopedia of Astronomy and Astrophysics. Academic Press.
- Meyers, Robert A., ed. Encyclopedia of Physical Science and Technology., 2nd ed., Academic Press, 1992.
- Mitton, Jacqueline (1998). The Penguin Dictionary of Astronomy. Penguin Books. ISBN 978-0-14-051375-2.
- Mitton, Jacqueline (29 January 2001). Cambridge Dictionary of Astronomy. Cambridge University Press. ISBN 978-0-521-80480-6.
- Moore, Patrick (15 August 2002). Astronomy Encyclopedia. Oxford University Press. ISBN 978-0-19-521833-6.
- Moore, Patrick. The International Encyclopedia of Astronomy. Crown, 1987.
- Moore, Patrick. Patrick Moore's A-Z of Astronomy. Norton, rev. ed., 1987.
- Muller, Paul (1968). Concise Encyclopedia of Astronomy. Collins.
- Murdin, Paul. Encyclopedia of astronomy and astrophysics. Institute of Physics Publ.; Nature Publ. Group, 2001. ISBN 0333750888.
- Murdin, Paul; Penston, Margaret (30 September 2004). The Firefly Encyclopedia Of Astronomy. Firefly Books. ISBN 978-1-55297-797-2.
- Murdin, Paul; Penston, Margaret (1 September 2004). The Canopus Encyclopedia of Astronomy. Canopus. ISBN 978-0-9537868-8-6.

== P ==
- Parker, Sybil, ed. McGraw-Hill Encyclopedia of Science and Technology. 7th ed., McGraw-Hill, 1992.
- Parker, Sybil P. and Jay M. Pasachoff(1993). McGraw-Hill encyclopedia of astronomy. McGraw-Hill. ISBN 978-0-07-045314-2.
- Porter, Roy, Marilyn Bailey Ogilvie. The biographical dictionary of scientists. Oxford University Press, 2000. ISBN 0195216636.

== R ==
- Ramamurthy, G. (2005). Biographical Dictionary Of Great Astronomers. Sura Books. ISBN 978-81-7478-697-5.
- Ridpath, Ian (1 March 2012). A Dictionary of Astronomy. Oxford University Press. ISBN 978-0-19-960905-5.
- Ridpath, Ian. The illustrated encyclopedia of the universe. Watson-Guptill Publications, 2001. ISBN 0823025128.
- Ridpath, Ian (1 January 1980). The Illustrated Encyclopedia of Astronomy and Space. Crowell. ISBN 978-0-690-01838-7.
- Ridpath, Ian; Woodruff, John (13 September 1996). Cambridge Astronomy Dictionary. Cambridge University Press. ISBN 978-0-521-58007-6.
- Ronan, Colin A. (1979). Encyclopedia of astronomy: a comprehensive survey of our solar system, galaxy and beyond. Hamlyn. ISBN 978-0-600-30362-6.
- Room, Adrian. Dictionary of astronomical names. Routledge, 1988. ISBN 0415012988.
- Rudaux, Lucien; Vaucouleurs, Gérard Henri de (1959). Larousse Encyclopedia of Astronomy. Prometheus Press.
- Rycroft, Michael. The Cambridge Encyclopedia of Space. Cambridge, 1990.

== S ==
- Sachs, Margaret. UFO Encyclopedia. Putnam, 1981.
- Satterthwaite, Gilbert Elliott (1 January 1970). Encyclopedia of Astronomy. Hamlyn.
- Schweighauser, Charles A. Astronomy from A to Z: A Dictionary of Celestial Objects and Ideas. Sangamon State University, 1991.
- Spitz, Armand; Gaynor, Frank (1959). Dictionary of Astronomy and Astronautics. Philosophical Library.
- Stewart, John. Moons of the Solar System: An Illustrated Encyclopedia. McFarland, 1991.
- Story, Ronald. Encyclopedia of UFOs. Doubleday, 1980.

== T ==
- Trimble, Virginia; Williams, Thomas; Bracher, Katherine (20 November 2007). Biographical Encyclopedia of Astronomers. Springer. ISBN 978-0-387-31022-0.

== W ==
- Weigert, Alfred; Zimmermann, Helmut (1968). A Concise Encyclopedia of Astronomy. American Elsevier Pub. Co.
- Welch, Rosanne. Encyclopedia of women in aviation and space. ABC-CLIO, 1998. ISBN 0874369584.
- Woodruff, John (1 October 2003). Firefly Astronomy Dictionary. Firefly Books. ISBN 978-1-55297-837-5.

== Y ==
- Yenne, Bill. Encyclopedia of U.S. Spacecraft. Exeter Books, 1985.

== See also ==
- Bibliography of encyclopedias
