= List of books about LSD =

This is a chronological list of notable books written about LSD. Both fictional and non-fictional books are included.

== Fiction ==
- Acid (2016)
- Outside Looking In (2019)

== Non-fiction ==
- The Psychedelic Experience (1964)
- God in a Pill? (1966)
- The Electric Kool-Aid Acid Test (1968)
- High Priest (1968)
- Acid Dreams (1985)
- This Is Your Country On Drugs (2009)
- Heads: A Biography of Psychedelic America (2016)
- How to Change Your Mind (2018)
