= Bibliography of South Dakota history =

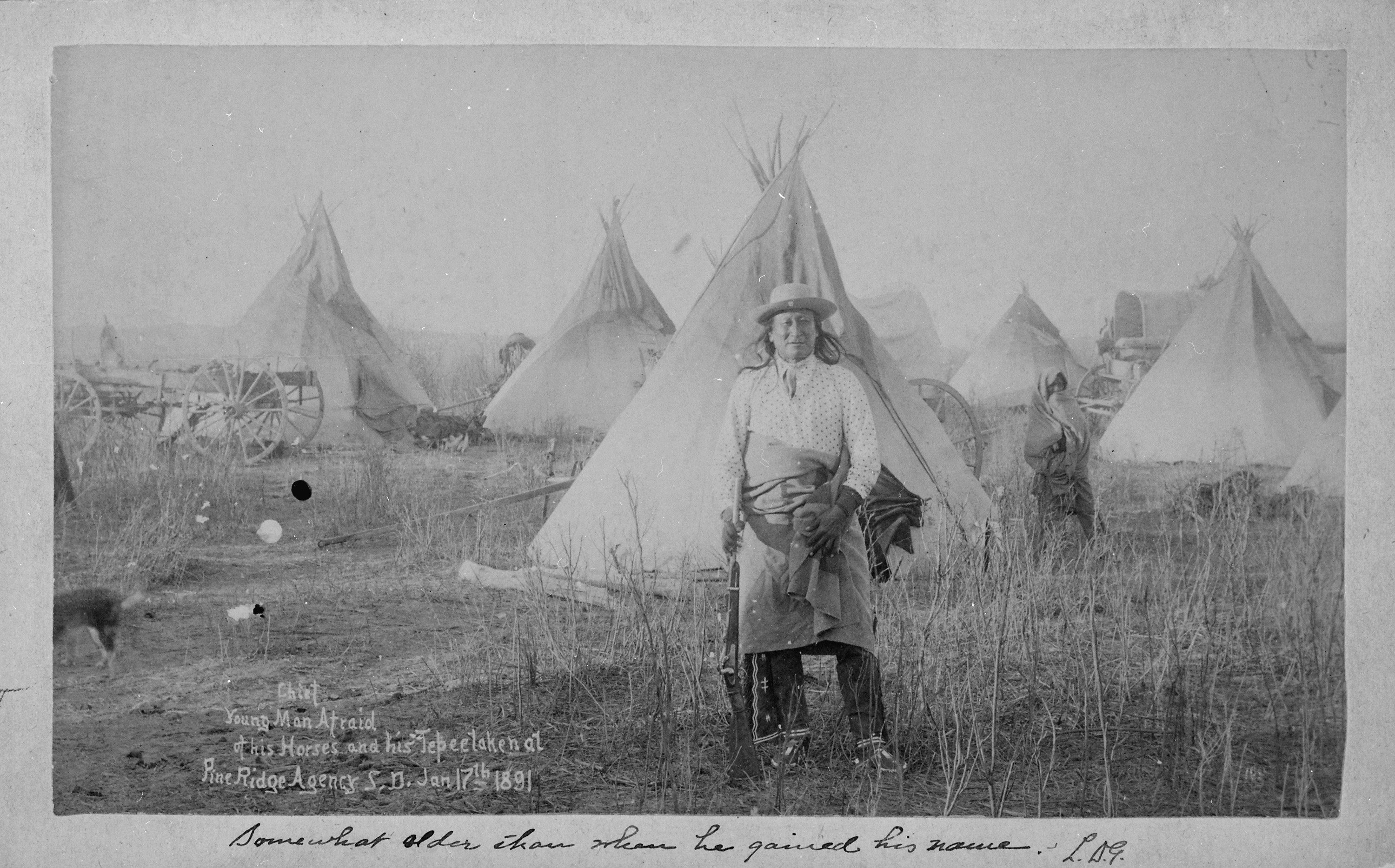
January 17, 1891: Young Man Afraid of His Horses and his tepee at Pine Ridge

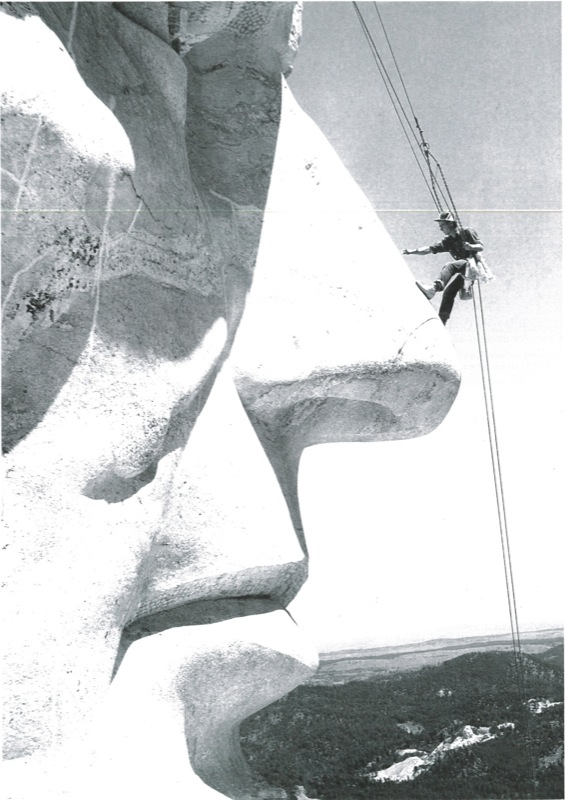
Herb Conn dangled from the faces on Mount Rushmore each fall to do maintenance work. Circa 1961 to 1972.

The following works deal with the cultural, political, economic, military, biographical and geologic history of pre-territorial South Dakota, the southern part of Dakota Territory and the State of South Dakota.

== Bibliographies ==
- Laubersheimer, Sue (1985). South Dakota Changing, Changeless, 1889-1989: A Selected Annotated Bibliography with Supplement and Index. South Dakota Humanities Council. ISBN 978-0-9632157-3-4. Recommended by the South Dakota State Archives.

== General histories ==
South Dakota Magazine. This general-interest magazine covers history, art, and current events of South Dakota.

- Hasselstrom, Linda M. (1994). Roadside History of South Dakota. Missoula, MT: Mountain Press Publishing Company. ISBN 0-87842-262-5.
- Hoover, Herbert T., and Harry F. Thompson. A new South Dakota history (Center for Western Studies, 2005)
- Karolevitz, Robert F.; Hunhoff, Bernie (1988). Uniquely South Dakota. Donning Company. ISBN 978-0-89865-730-2. From the publisher of South Dakota Magazine, with many photographs.
- Miller, John E. (2014). "South Dakota at 125: Interpreting the Past, Assessing the Present, and Imagining the Future". The Great War and the Northern Plains.
- Schell, Herbert S. (2004). History of South Dakota. Pierre, SD: South Dakota State Historical Society Press. ISBN 0-9715171-3-4.
- Thompson, Harry F., ed. (2009). A New South Dakota History (Second ed.). Sioux Falls, SD: Center for Western Studies – Augustana College. ISBN 978-0-931170-00-3.
- Wishart, David J. (2004). Encyclopedia of the Great Plains. U of Nebraska Press. ISBN 0-8032-4787-7. complete text online; 900 pages of scholarly articles

=== Doane Robinson ===
Doane Robinson was a state historian of South Dakota and the author of several important works on the state's history through the first decade of the 1900s.

- Robinson, Doane (1904). History of South Dakota. B. F. Bowen.
- Robinson, Doane (1905). A Brief History of South Dakota. American Book Company.

== American Indian history ==
- Deloria, Philip J. and Salisbury, Neal (eds.) (2004). A Companion to American Indian History. Oxford: Wiley-Blackwell. ISBN 1-4051-2131-9.
- Ronda, James P. (2002). Lewis and Clark Among the Indians. Lincoln, NE: University of Nebraska Press. ISBN 0-8032-8990-1.
- Holder, Preston (1974). The Hoe and the Horse on the Plains: A Study of Cultural Development Among North American Indians. Lincoln, NE: University of Nebraska Press. ISBN 0-8032-5809-7.

== Gold rush and Plains Wars ==
- Krause, Herbert; Olson, Gary D. (August 1974). Prelude to glory: a newspaper accounting of Custer's 1874 expedition to the Black Hills. Brevet Press. ISBN 978-0-88498-019-3.

== Homesteading and agricultural settlement years ==
- Laskin, David (13 October 2009). The Children's Blizzard. HarperCollins. ISBN 978-0-06-186652-4.

== Economic history ==
- Fite, Gilbert. "The Transformation of South Dakota Agriculture: The Effects of Mechanization, 1939–1964". South Dakota History. 19 (3: Fall 1989): 278–305.

== Local studies ==
- Atherton, Lewis Eldon (1966). Main Street on the Middle Border. Quadrangle.
- Harrison, Fraser. Infinite West: Travels in South Dakota (2013) Excerpt
- Miller, John E. Miller. Laura Ingalls Wilder's Little Town: Where History and Literature Meet (1994) excerpt
- Parker, Watson. Deadwood: The Golden Years (1981) excerpt
- Schwieder, Dorothy Hubbard. Growing Up with the Town: Family and Community on the Great Plains (University of Iowa Press, 2002); family life in the town of Presho, 1880s-1930s
- Stock, Catherine McNicol (1 September 1997). Main Street in Crisis: The Great Depression and the Old Middle Class on the Northern Plains. UNC Press Books. ISBN 978-0-8078-4689-6. - online edition

== Geology ==
- Conn, Herb; Conn, Jan (June 1981). The Jewel Cave Adventure: Fifty Miles of Discovery in South Dakota. ISBN 0-939748-01-0. (describes the exploration of Jewel Cave National Monument from its discovery to the mid-1980s)

== Political history ==
- Blackorby Edward. Prairie Rebel: The Public Life of William Lemke (University of Nebraska Press, 1955)
- Carlson Paul, and Steve Porter. "South Dakota Congressmen and the Hundred Days of the New Deal". South Dakota History vol, 8, no. 4 (Fall 1978): 327-39.
- Easton Patricia O'Keefe. "Women's Suffrage in South Dakota: The Final Decade, 1911–1920". South Dakota History vol 13 (1983): 206–26.
- Garry, Patrick M., and Candice Spurlin. "History of the 1889 South Dakota Constitution." South Dakota Law Review 59 (2014): 14+.
- Lamar Howard. Dakota Territory, 1861–1899: A Study in Frontier Politics (Yale University Press, 1956)
- Lauck, Jon K. (11 October 2012). Prairie Republic: The Political Culture of Dakota Territory, 1879-1889. University of Oklahoma Press. ISBN 978-0-8061-8588-0.
- Lauck, Jon; Miller, John E.; Simmons (Jr.), Donald C. (2011). The Plains Political Tradition: Essays on South Dakota Political Culture. South Dakota State Historical Society Press. ISBN 978-0-9822749-2-7.
- Maier, Chris. "The Farmers' Fight for Representation: Third-Party Politics in South Dakota, 1889–1918." Great Plains Quarterly (2014) 34#2 pp: 143-162.
- Miller, John E., “Defining Moments in Twentieth-century South Dakota Political History,” South Dakota History, 42 (Summer 2012), 168–90.

== Biographies ==
- Ingalls Wilder, Laura (November 20, 2014). Pioneer Girl (annotated ed.). South Dakota State Historical Society. ISBN 978-0984504176.
- Hoover, Herbert T.; Zimmerman, Larry J., eds. (1989). South Dakota Leaders: From Pierre Chouteau, Jr., to Oscar Howe. Vermillion: University of South Dakota Press. p. 439.
- Norris, Kathleen (1993). Dakota: A Spiritual Geography. Ticknor & Fields. ISBN 0-395-63320-6. Autobiography of life in northwestern South Dakota.

== Societies, organizations, and collections ==
- "South Dakota State Historical Society". State of South Dakota. Pierre, South Dakota.
  - "South Dakota Digital Archives". South Dakota State Historical Society.
- "Center for Western Studies". Augustana College. Sioux Falls, South Dakota.
- "South Dakota Oral History Center". University of South Dakota. Vermillion, South Dakota. 1950s-present.
- "South Dakota Agricultural Heritage Museum". South Dakota State University. Brookings, South Dakota. Archived from the original on 2014-12-18. 1882-present.

== See also ==
- Bibliography of the Lewis and Clark Expedition
- Bibliography of Montana history
- Bibliography of Wyoming history
- Bibliography of North Dakota history
- Bibliography of Minnesota history
- Bibliography of Nebraska history
- List of bibliographies on American history
