= List of bibliographies on American history =

Central themes and key chapters in American history

American Revolution
Drafting the Declaration of Independence

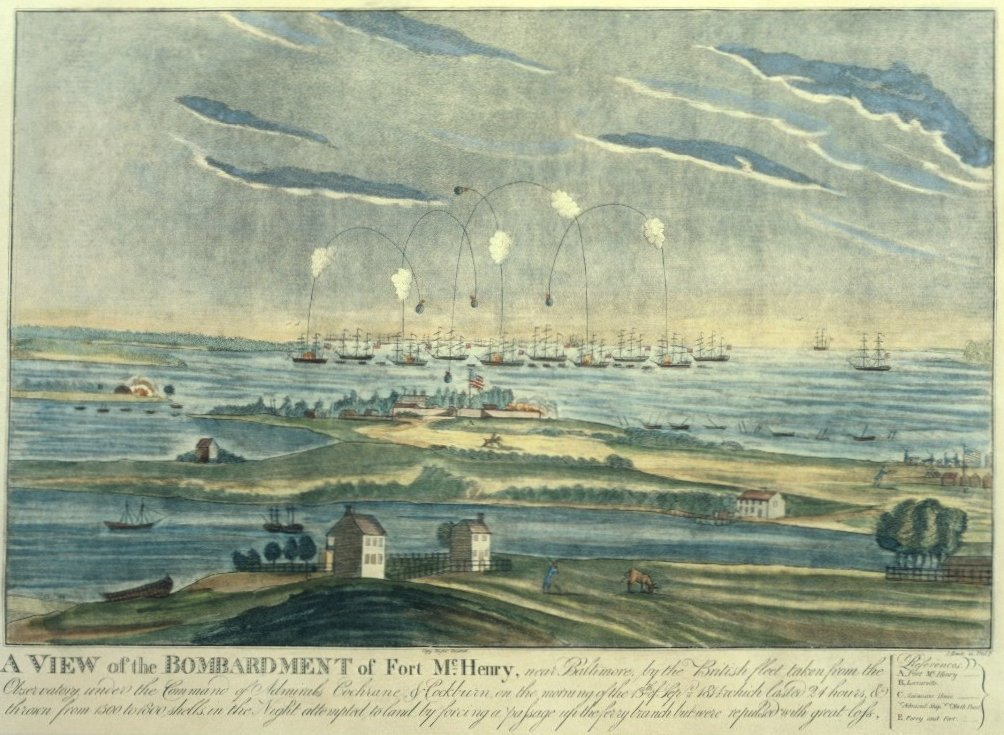
War of 1812
Battle of Baltimore

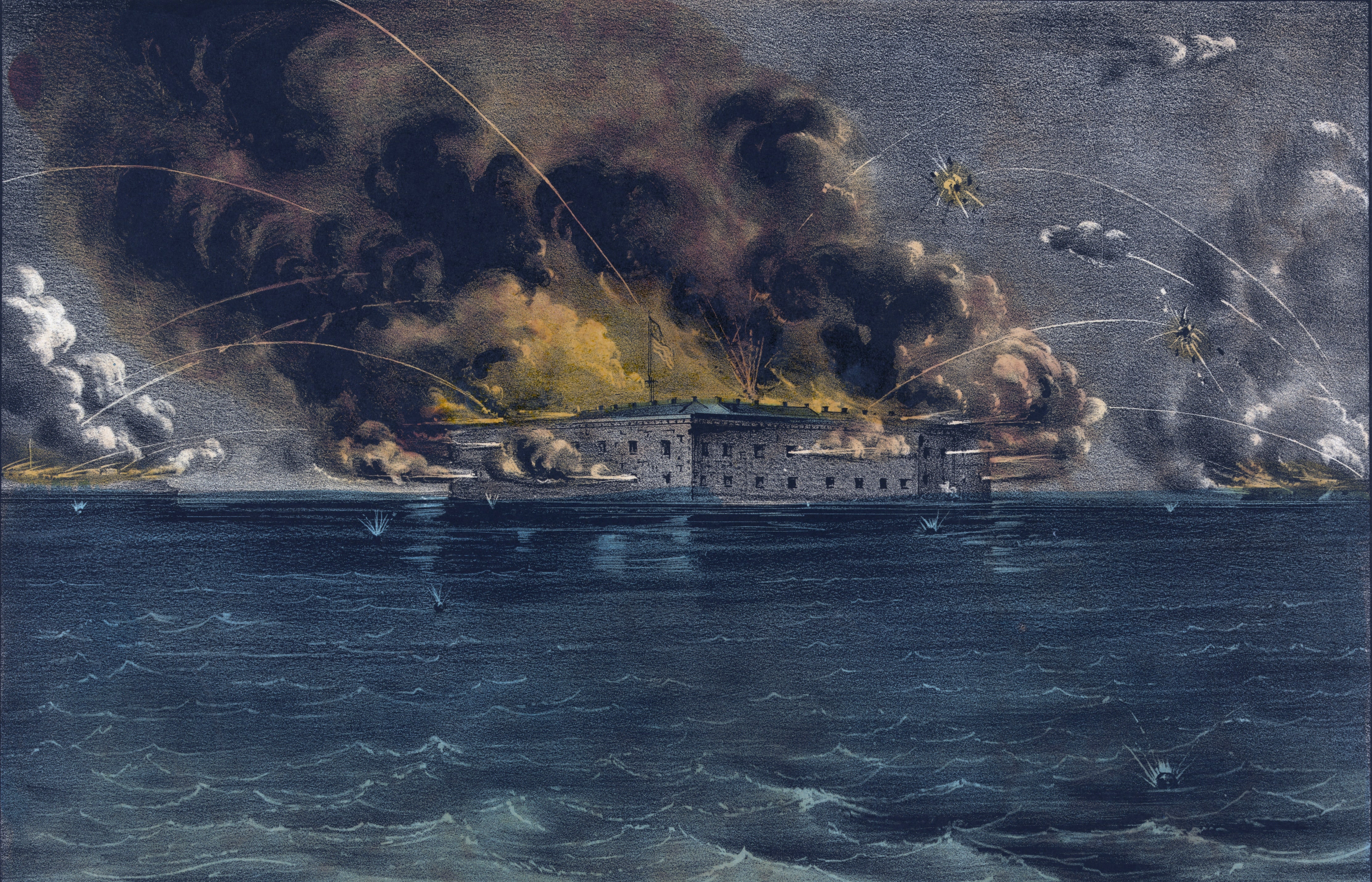
American Civil War
Battle of Ft. Sumter

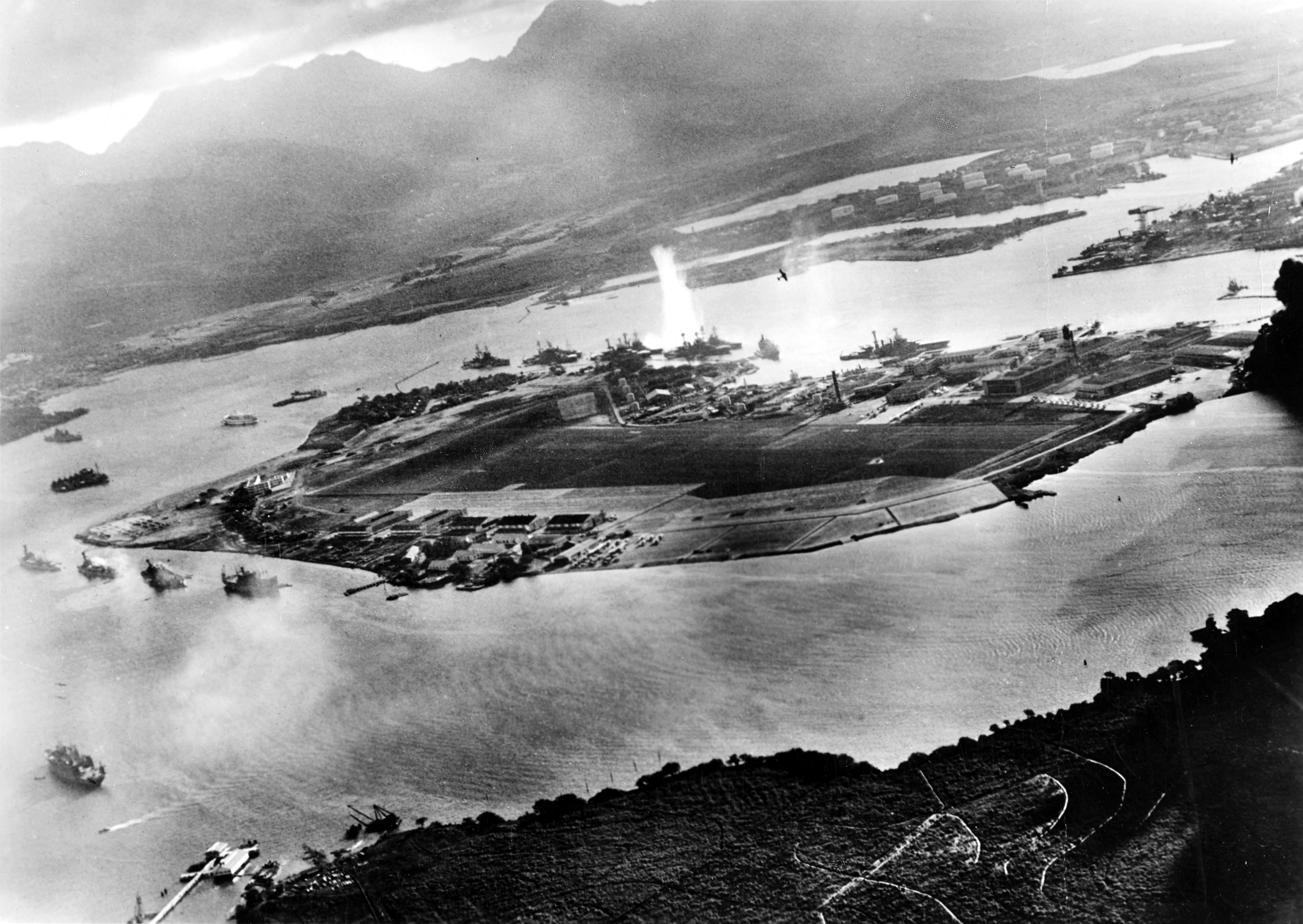
World War II
Bombing of Pearl Harbor

The List of bibliographies on American history is a stand alone list of bibliographies about the history of the United States, intended as a quick reference. The bibliographies listed here are devoted only to major subjects in American history, i.e., founding fathers, American Revolution, presidents, wars, etc.

== General ==
- Bibliography of American history
- Bibliography of United States military history
- Bibliography of US Naval history

=== Presidents ===
Listed in chronological order

- Bibliography of George Washington
- Bibliography of John Adams
- Bibliography of Thomas Jefferson
- Bibliography of James Madison
- Bibliography of James Monroe
- Bibliography of John Quincy Adams
- Bibliography of Andrew Jackson
- Bibliography of Martin Van Buren
- Bibliography of Abraham Lincoln
- Bibliography of Andrew Johnson
- Bibliography of Ulysses S. Grant
- Bibliography of William McKinley
- Bibliography of Theodore Roosevelt
- Bibliography of William Howard Taft
- Bibliography of Woodrow Wilson
- Bibliography of Herbert Hoover
- Bibliography of Franklin D. Roosevelt
- Bibliography of Harry S. Truman
- Bibliography of Dwight D. Eisenhower
- Bibliography of John F. Kennedy
- Bibliography of Lyndon B. Johnson
- Bibliography of Richard Nixon
- Bibliography of Jimmy Carter
- Bibliography of Ronald Reagan
- Bibliography of George H. W. Bush
- Bibliography of Bill Clinton
- Bibliography of George W. Bush
- Bibliography of Barack Obama
- Bibliography of Donald Trump
- Bibliography of Joe Biden

== Early American ==
- Bibliography of the American colonies
- Bibliography of the American Revolutionary War
- Bibliography of early United States naval history
- Bibliography of Benjamin Franklin
- Bibliography of early American publishers and printers
- Bibliography of the United States Constitution
- Bibliography of the Burr conspiracy
- Bibliography of the War of 1812
- Bibliography of the Lewis and Clark Expedition
- Bibliography of slavery in the United States
- Bibliography of the slave trade in the United States

== American Civil War ==
- Bibliography of the American Civil War
- Bibliography of American Civil War military leaders
- Bibliography of American Civil War battles and campaigns
- Bibliography of American Civil War Confederate military unit histories
- Bibliography of American Civil War Union military unit histories
- Bibliography of American Civil War homefront
- Regional bibliography of the American Civil War
- Bibliography of the Reconstruction era

== 20th century ==
- Bibliography of World War I
- Bibliography of World War II
- Bibliography for the Korean War
- Bibliography of the Cold War

== Regional ==
- Bibliography of Midwestern history
- Bibliography of the American frontier
- Bibliography of the Western United States
- Bibliography of California history
- Bibliography of Idaho history
- Bibliography of Montana history
- Bibliography of Oregon history
- Bibliography of North Dakota history
- Bibliography of South Dakota history
- Bibliography of South Carolina history
- Bibliography of Wyoming history

== Miscellaneous ==
- Bibliography of the history of education in the United States
- Mexican American bibliography
- U.S. representative bibliography (congressional memoirs)
- U.S. senator bibliography (congressional memoirs)
- Bibliography of United States presidential spouses and first ladies

== See also ==
- Bibliography of 18th-19th century Royal Naval history
- List of American Civil War battles
- List of bibliographies of U.S. presidents
- List of bibliographies on Canadian history
- Bibliography of British and Irish History
- Bibliography of the French Revolution
- Bibliography of Russian history (set index)
- Bibliography of the Soviet Union (set index)
