= Bibliography of Oregon history =

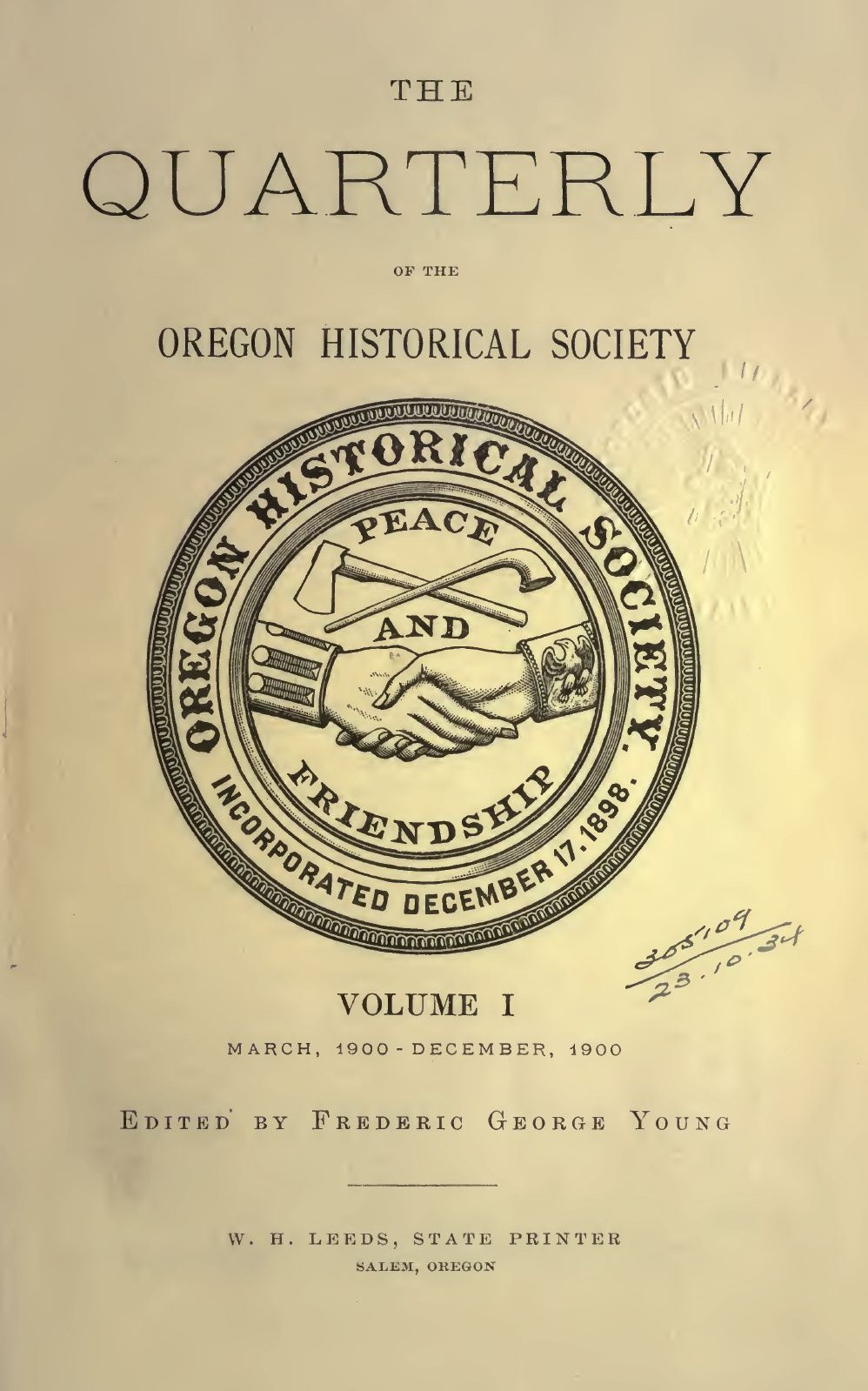
Volume 1, Oregon Historical Society Quarterly, 1900

The following published works deal with the cultural, political, economic, military, biographical and geologic history of pre-territorial Oregon, Oregon Territory and the State of Oregon.

== Surveys of Oregon history ==
- Bancroft, Hubert Howe (1886). History of Oregon 1834-1848 (The Works of Hubert Howe Bancroft. Vol. 29) (PDF). San Francisco, CA.: The History Company.
- Bancroft, Hubert Howe (1888). History of Oregon 1848-1888 (The Works of Hubert Howe Bancroft. Vol. 30) (PDF). San Francisco, CA.: The History Company.
- Corning, Howard McKinley (1940). Oregon: End of the Trail. Portland, OR.: Binfords & Mort.
- Dicken, Samuel N.; Emily F. Dicken (1979). The Making of Oregon: A Study in Historical Geography. Portland, OR.: Oregon Historical Society Press. ISBN 978-0-87595-081-5.
- Dodds, Gordon B. (1977). Oregon: A Bicentennial History. New York, NY.: W. W. Norton & Company, Inc. ISBN 0-393-05632-5.
- Dodds, Gordon B. (1986). The American Northwest: A History of Oregon and Washington. Arlington Heights, IL.: The Forum Press, Inc. ISBN 0-88273-239-0.
- Egan, Timothy (1990). The Good Rain: Across Time and Terrain in the Pacific Northwest. New York, NY.: Alfred A. Knopf. ISBN 0-679-73485-6.
- Hines, H. K. (Harvey Kimball) (1893). An illustrated history of the state of Oregon (microform) : containing a history of Oregon from the earliest period of its discovery to the present time, together with glimpses of its auspicious future; illustrations and full-page portraits of some of its eminent men and biographical mention of many of its pioneers and prominent citizens of to-day. Canadiana.org. Chicago : Lewis Pub. Co. ISBN 978-0-665-15234-4
- Johansen, Dorothy O.; Charles Gates (1967). Empire of the Columbia: A History of the Pacific Northwest. New York, NY.: Harper & Row, Publishers.
- Marsh, Tom (2012). To the Promised Land: A History of Government and Politics in Oregon. Oregon State University Press. ISBN 978-0-87071-657-7.
- Pomeroy, Earl (1965). The Pacific Slope: A History of California, Oregon, Washington, Idaho, Utah, and Nevada. New York, NY.: Alfred A. Knopf.
- Potter, Miles (1976). Oregon's Golden Years: Bonanza of the West. Caldwell, ID.: The Caxton Printers, Ltd. ISBN 0-87004-254-8.
- Robbins, William G. (1977). Landscapes of Promise: The Oregon Story 1800-1940. Seattle, WA.: University of Washington Press. ISBN 0-295-97901-1.
- Schwantes, Carlos Arnaldo (1996). The Pacific Northwest: An Interpretive History. Lincoln, NE.: University of Nebraska Press. ISBN 0-8032-4225-5.
- Scott, Leslie M. (1924). "Oregonian History Writers and Their Materials" . Oregon Historical Quarterly.
- Stack, William C. Historic Photos of Oregon (2010)

== Pre-statehood ==
- Clark, Malcolm Jr. E (1981). Eden Seekers: The Settlement of Oregon 1818-1863. Boston, MA.: Houghton Mifflin Company.
- Cook, Warren (1973). Flood Tide of Empire: Spain and the Pacific Northwest 1543-1810. New Haven, CT: Yale University Press. ISBN 978-0-300-01577-5.
- Gibson, James R. (1985). Farming the Frontier: The Agricultural Opening of the Oregon Country 1786-1846. Seattle, WA.: University of Washington Press. ISBN 0-295-96297-6.
- Gough, Barry M. (1992). The Northwest Coast: British Navigation, Trade, and Discovery to 1812. Vancouver, BC.: University of British Columbia Press. ISBN 0-7748-0399-1.
- Irving, Washington (1836). Astoria; or Anecdotes of an Enterprise Beyond the Rocky Mountains. 2 vols. Philadelphia: Carey, Lea & Blanchard.
- Lowenberg, Robert J. (1975). Equality on the Oregon Frontier: Jason Lee and the Oregon Mission 1834-1843. Seattle, WA.: University of Washington Press. ISBN 0-295-95491-4.
- Rich, E. E. (1958–59). The History of the Hudson's Bay Company 1670-1870. 2 vols. London: Hudson's Bay Record Society.

== Historic expeditions ==
- Fremont, John Charles (1845). Report of the Exploring Expedition to the Rocky Mountains in the Year 1842, and to Oregon and North California in the years 1843-'44. Washington, DC.: Gales and Seaton, Printers.
- Goetzmann, William H. (1966). Exploration and Empire: The Explorer and the Scientist in the Winning of the American West. New York, NY.: Alfred A. Knopf.
- Johnson, Overton; Winter, William H. (1846). Route across the Rocky Mountains with a Description of Oregon and California . reproduced in the Oregon Historical Quarterly, 1906.
- Nokes, J. Richard (1998). Almost A Hero: The Voyages of John Meares, R.N., to China, Hawaii, and the Northwest Coast. Pullman, WA.: Washington State University Press. ISBN 0-87422-155-2.
- Nokes, J. Richard (1991). Columbia's River: The Voyages of Robert Gray 1787-1793. Tacoma, WA.: Washington State Historical Society. ISBN 0-917048-68-7.
- Wilkes, Charles (1845). Narrative of the United States Exploring Expedition During the Years 1838, 1839, 1840, 1841, 1842, Vols. 4-5. Philadelphia: Lea and Blanchard.

=== Lewis and Clark Expedition (1804-1806) ===
- Ambrose, Stephen E. (1996). Undaunted Courage. New York: Simon & Schuster. ISBN 0-684-81107-3.
- Moulto, Gary E., ed. (1988–91). The Journals of the Lewis and Clark Expedition. Vols. 5-7. Lincoln, NE.: University of Nebraska Press.

== Geography and environment ==
- Bell, Jon. On Mount Hood: A Biography of Oregon's Perilous Peak (2011)
- Dillow, Frank. "Connecting Oregon: The Slow Road to Rapid Communications, 1843-–2009." Oregon Historical Quarterly 111.2 (2010): 184–219. in JSTOR
- Hayes, Derek. Historical Atlas of Washington and Oregon (2011)
- Loy, William G.; Stuart Allen; Clyde Patton (1976). Atlas of Oregon. Eugene, OR.: University of Oregon.
- McArthur, Lewis A. (1992). Oregon Geographic Names 6th ed. Portland, OR.: Oregon Historical Society. ISBN 0-87595-278-X.
- Meinig, Donald W. (1968). The Great Columbia Plain: A Historical Geography 1805-1910. Seattle, WA.: University of Washington Press.
- McKelvey, Susan Delano (1991). Botanical exploration of the trans-Mississippi West, 1790-1850. Corvallis, Oregon: Oregon State University Press. ISBN 978-0-87071-513-6. OCLC 1052686671.

== Business, industry and labor ==
- Beckham, Dow (1995). Stars in the Dark: Coal Mines of Southwestern Oregon. Coos Bay, OR.: Arago Books. ISBN 0-930998-06-5.
- Beckham, Stephen Dow (1987). O&C Sustained Yield Act: the Land, the Law, the Legacy. Portland, OR.: U.S. Department of Interior, Bureau of Land Management.
- Beckham, Stephen Dow (1984). Taylor Grazing Act in Oregon 1934-1984. U.S. Department of Interior, Bureau of Land Management, Portland, OR.
- Bergoffen, William W. (1976). 100 Years of Federal Forestry. Washington, D. C.: U. S. Department of Agriculture Information Bulletin No. 402, Government Printing Office.
- Brock, Emily K. Money Trees: The Douglas Fir and American Forestry, 1900-1944 (Oregon State University Press, 2015). 272 pp.
- Cox, Thomas R. (1974). Mills and Markets: A History of the Pacific Coast Lumber Industry to 1900. Seattle, WA.: University of Washington Press. ISBN 978-0-295-95349-6.
- Disque, Brice P. (c. 1919). History of Spruce Production Division, United States Army. United States Spruce Production Corporation, n.p.
- Dodds, Gordon B.; Craig E. Wollner (1990). The Silicon Forest: High Tech in the Portland Area 1945-1986. Portland, OR.: Oregon Historical Society. ISBN 978-0-87595-230-7.
- Gamboa, Erasmo (1990). Mexican Labor and World War II: Braceros in the Pacific Northwest 1942-1947. Austin, TX.: University of Texas Press. ISBN 0-295-97849-X.
- Greever, William S. (1963). The Bonanza West: The Story of Western Mining Rushes 1848-1900. Norman, OK.: University of Oklahoma Press.
- Hyman, Harold (1963). Soldiers and Spruce: Origins of the Loyal Legion of Loggers & Lumbermen. Los Angeles, CA.: Institute of Industrial Relations, University of California.
- Oliphant, J. Orin (1968). On the Cattle Ranges of the Oregon Country. Seattle, WA.: University of Washington Press.
- Puter, S. A. D. (1908). Looters of the Public Domain (PDF). Portland, OR.: The Portland Printing House, Publishers.
- Richardson, Elmo (1980). BLM's Billion-Dollar Checkerboard: Managing the O & C Lands. Santa Cruz, CA.: Forest History Society.
- Simpson, Peter K. (1987). The Community of Cattlemen: A Social History of the Cattle Industry in Southeastern Oregon 1869-1912. Moscow, ID.: University of Idaho Press. ISBN 0-89301-117-7.
- Steen, Harold K. (1991). The Beginning of the National Forest System. U.S. Department of Agriculture, Forest Service FS-488.
- Steen, Harold K. (1992). The Origin of the National Forests: A Centennial Symposium. Durham, NC.: Forest History Society.
- Tyler, Robert L. (1967). Rebels of the Woods: The I.W.W. in the Pacific Northwest. Eugene, OR.: University of Oregon.

== Military histories ==
- Fletcher, Randol B. (2011). Hidden History of Civil War Oregon. Gloucestershire: The History Press. ISBN 978-1-60949-424-7.
- Frazer, Robert W., ed. (1965). Forts of the West: Military Forts and Presidios and Posts Commonly Called Forts West of the Mississippi River to 1898. Norman, OK.: University of Oklahoma Press.
- Frazer, Robert W., ed. (1963). Mansfield on the Condition of the Western Forts 1853-54. Norman, OK.: University of Oklahoma Press.
- Settle, Raymond, ed. (1989). The March of the Mounted Riflemen From Fort Leavenworth to Fort Vancouver, May to October 1849. Lincoln, NE.: University of Nebraska Press. ISBN 0-8032-9196-5.
- Webber, Bert (1975). Retaliation: Japanese Attacks and Allied Countermeasures on the Pacific Coast in World War II. Corvallis, OR.: Oregon State University Press. ISBN 0-87071-076-1.
- Willingham, William F. (1983). Army Engineers and the Development of Oregon: A History of the Portland District. Washington, DC.: U.S. Army Corps of Engineers. Government Printing Office.

== Native American histories ==
- Aikens, C. Melvin (1986). Archaeology of Oregon. Portland, OR.: Oregon State Office, U.S. Department of Interior, Bureau of Land Management., on Indians
- Beckham, Stephen Dow (1977). The Indians of Western Oregon: This Land Was Theirs. Coos Bay, OR.: Arago Books. ISBN 0-930998-03-0.
- Beckham, Stephen Dow (1971). Requiem for a People: The Rogue Indians and the Frontiersmen. Norman, OK.: University of Oklahoma Press. ISBN 0-87071-521-6.
- Buan, Carolyn M.; Richard Lewis, eds. (1991). The First Oregonians: An Illustrated Collection of Essays on Traditional Lifeways, Federal- Indian Relations, and the State's Native People Today. Portland, OR.: Oregon Council for the Humanities. ISBN 1-880377-00-4.
- Josephy, Alvin M. Jr. (1965). The Nez Perce Indians and the Opening of the Northwest. New Haven, CT.: Yale University Press.
- O'Donnell, Terrence (1991). An Arrow in the Earth: General Joel Palmer and the Indians of Oregon. Portland, OR.: Oregon Historical Society Press. ISBN 0-87595-155-4.
- Ruby, Robert H.; John A. Brown (1986). A Guide to the Indian Tribes of the Pacific Northwest. Norman, OK.: University of Oklahoma Press. ISBN 0-8061-4024-0.
- Ruby, Robert H. (1981). Indians of the Pacific Northwest: A History. Norman, OK.: University of Oklahoma Press. ISBN 0-8061-1731-1.
- Suttles, Wayne, ed. (1990). Handbook of North American Indians. Vol. 7, Northwest Coast. Washington, D.C.: Smithsonian Institution. ISBN 0-16-020390-2.
- Walker, Deward E. Jr., ed. (1998). Handbook of North American Indians, Vol. 12, Plateau. Washington, D.C.: Smithsonian Institution. ISBN 0-16-049514-8.

== Local and regional histories ==
- Abbott, Carl. "From urban frontier to metropolitan region: Oregon's cities from 1870 to 2008." Oregon Historical Quarterly (2009): 74–95. online
- Allen, Barbara (1987). Homesteading the High Desert. Logan, UT.: Utah State University. ISBN 0-87480-268-7.
- Armstrong, Chester H. (1965). History of the Oregon State Parks (1917-1963). Salem, OR.: Oregon State Highway Department.
- Barlow, Jeffrey; Christine Richardson (1991). Gum San: Land of the Gold Mountain. Bend, OR.: The High Desert Museum.
- Beckham, Dow (1998). Bandon-by-the-Sea: Hope and Perseverance in an Oregon Coastal Town. Coos Bay, OR.: Arago Books.
- Beckham, Stephen Dow (1986). Land of the Umpqua: A History of Douglas County, Oregon. Roseburg, OR.: Douglas County Commissioners.
- Bowen, William A. (1978). The Willamette Valley: Migration and Settlement on the Oregon Frontier. Seattle, WA.: University of Washington Press. ISBN 0-295-95590-2.
- Brimlow, George Francis (1951). Harney County, Oregon, and Its Range Land. Portland, OR.: Binfords & Mort, Publishers.
- Clark, Keith; Lowell Tiller (1967). Terrible Trail: The Meek Cutoff 1845. Caldwell, ID.: The Caxton Printers, Ltd. ISBN 0-89288-233-6.
- Douthit, Nathan (1981). The Coos Bay Region 1890-1944: Life on a Coastal Frontier. Coos Bay, OR.: River West Books. ISBN 978-0-9607192-0-4.
- Hussey, John A. (1967). Champoeg: Place of Transition. Portland, OR.: Oregon Historical Society.
- Jackson, Royal; Jennifer Lee (1978). Harney County: An Historical Inventory. Burns, OR.: Harney County Planning Commission and Harney County Historical Society.
- Kittredge, William (1987). Owning It All. St. Paul, MN.: Graywolf Press. ISBN 1-55597-366-3.
- Merriam, Lawrence C. Jr.; David G. Talbot (1992). Oregon's Highway Park System 1921-1989: An Administrative History. Salem, OR.: Oregon Parks and Recreation Department.
- O'Callaghan, Jerry A. (1960). The Dispossession of the Public Domain in Oregon. Washington, DC.: Government Printing Office.
- Ronda, James P. (1990). Astoria and Empire. Lincoln, NE.: University of Nebraska Press. ISBN 0-8032-3896-7.
- Smith, Dwight A.; James B. Norman; Pieter A. Dykman (1985). Historic Highway Bridges of Oregon. Salem, OR.: Oregon Department of Transportation. ISBN 0-87595-205-4.
- Straton, Kathryn A. (1977). Oregon's Beaches: A Birthright Preserved. Salem, OR.: Oregon State Parks and Recreation Branch.
- Unruh, John D. Jr. (1979). The Plains Across: The Overland Emigrants and the Trans-Mississippi West 1840-60. Urbana, IL.: University of Illinois Press. ISBN 0-252-00698-4.
- Vaughan, Thomas, ed. (1981). High & Mighty: Select Sketches about the Deschutes Country. Portland, OR.: Oregon Historical Society. ISBN 0-87595-103-1.

=== Portland ===
- Abbott, Carl. Portland in Three Centuries (Oregon State University Press, 2011)
- Abbott, Carl. "Regional city and network city: Portland and Seattle in the twentieth century." Western Historical Quarterly (1992): 293–322. online
- Gibson, Karen, and Carl Abbott. "Portland, Oregon." Cities 19.6 (2002): 425–436.
- Lansing, Jewel (2003). Portland: People, Politics, and Power, 1851-2001. Oregon State University Press. ISBN 978-0-87071-559-4.
- MacColl, E. Kimbark (1979). The Growth of a City: Power and Politics in Portland, Oregon 1915 to 1950. Portland, OR.: The Georgian Press Company. ISBN 0-9603408-1-5.
- MacColl, E. Kimbark (1976). The Shaping of a City: Business and Politics in Portland, Oregon 1885-1915. Portland, OR.: The Georgian Press Company.
- MacColl, E. Kimbark; Harry H. Stein (1988). Merchants, Money, and Power: The Portland Establishment 1843-1913. Portland, OR.: The Georgian Press. ISBN 0-9603408-3-1.

=== Columbia river ===
- Clark, Robert (1995). River of the West: Stories From the Columbia. New York, NY.: Harper Collins West. ISBN 978-0-06-258516-5.
- Dietrich, William (1995). Northwest Passage: The Great Columbia River. New York, NY.: Simon & Schuster. ISBN 0-295-97546-6.
- Donaldson, Ivan J.; Frederick K. Cramer (1971). Fishwheels of the Columbia. Portland, OR.: Binfords & Mort, Publishers. ISBN 0-8323-0007-1.
- Gronowski, Nancy H.; Jeanette Kloos (1987). A Study of the Historic Columbia River Highway. Salem, OR.: Oregon Department of Transportation.
- Harden, Blaine (1996). A River Lost: The Life and Death of the Columbia. New York, NY.: W. W. Norton & Company. ISBN 0-393-03936-6.
- Smith, Courtland (1979). Salmon Fishers of the Columbia. Corvallis, OR.: Oregon State University Press. ISBN 0-87071-313-2.
- Smith, Dwight A. (1984). Columbia River Highway Historic District. Salem, OR.: Oregon Department of Transportation.
- Tollefson, Gene. (1987). BPA & The Struggle for Power at Cost. Portland, OR.: Bonneville Power Administration.

=== Ghost towns ===
- Baker, John Harvard (2005). Camp Adair: The story of a World War II cantonment: today, Oregon's largest ghost town. J.H. Baker. ISBN 0-9718583-5-7.
- Florin, L.F. (1982). Oregon Ghost Towns. Superior Publishing Co. ISBN 0-87564-323-X.
- May, Keith F. (1996). Ghosts of Times Past: A Road Trip of Eastern Oregon Ghost Towns. Drigh Sighed Publications. ISBN 1-57502-107-2.
- Varney, Phillip (2005). Ghost Towns of the Pacific Northwest: Your Guide to Ghost Towns, Mining Camps, and Historic Forts of Oregon, Washington, and British Columbia. Voyageur Press. ISBN 0-89658-592-1.

== Biographies ==
- Barlow, Jeffrey; Christine Richardson (1979). China Doctor of John Day. Portland, OR.: Binford and Mort Publisher. ISBN 0-8323-0346-1.
- Beckham, Stephen Dow (1971). The Simpsons of Shore Acres. Coos Bay, OR.: Arago Books. ISBN 0-685-53206-2.
- Dodds, Gordon B. (1959). The Salmon King of Oregon: R. D. Hume and the Pacific Fisheries. Chapel Hill, NC.: The University of North Carolina Press.
- Foster, Mark S. (1989). Henry J. Kaiser: Builder in the Modern American West. Austin, TX: University of Texas Press. ISBN 978-0-292-73045-8.
- Jeffrey, Julie Roy (1991). Converting the West: A Biography of Narcissa Whitman. Norman, OK.: University of Oklahoma Press. ISBN 0-8061-2359-1.
- Moynihan, Ruth Barnes (1983). Rebel for Rights: Abigail Scott Duniway. New Haven, CT.: Yale University Press. ISBN 0-300-02952-7.
- Munnick, Harriet Duncan (1989). Priest's Progress: The Journey of Francis Norbert Blanchet from the Atlantic Ocean to the Pacific in Three Parishes. Portland, OR.: Binford & Mort Publishing. ISBN 0-8323-0474-3.

=== Memoirs, diaries and journals ===
- Deady, Matthew P. (1975). Malcolm Clark, Jr. (ed.). Pharisee Among Philistines: The Diary of Judge Matthew P. Deady 1871-92. 2 vols. Oregon Historical Society, Portland, OR.
- Greenhow, Robert (1840). Memoir, Historical and Political, on the Northwest Coast of North America (PDF). Washington, DC.: Blair and Rives.
- Palmer, Joel (1847). Journal of Travels Over the Rocky Mountains (PDF). Cincinnati, OH.: J.A. & U.P. James.
- Parker, Samuel (1838). Journal of an Exploring Tour Beyond the Rocky Mountains (PDF). Ithaca, NY.
- Thompson, Erwin N. (1969). Shallow Grave at Waiilatpu: The Sagers' West. Portland, OR.: Oregon Historical Society. ISBN 0-87595-024-8.
- Townsend, John Kirk (1839). Narrative of a Journey Across the Rocky Mountains, to the Columbia River (PDF). Philadelphia: Henry Perkins.

== Political histories ==
- Bourke, Paul; Donald DeBats (1995). Washington County: Politics and Community in Antebellum America. Baltimore, MD.: Johns Hopkins University Press. ISBN 0-8018-5946-8.
- Burton, Robert E. "The New Deal in Oregon," in John Braeman et al. eds. The New Deal: Volume Two - the State and Local Levels (1975) pp 355–75
- Brown, J. Henry (1892). Brown's Political History of Oregon: Provisional Government (PDF). Portland, OR.: Lewis & Dryden Printing Co.
- Etulain, Richard W. (2013). Lincoln and Oregon Country Politics in the Civil War. Corvallis, OR: Oregon State University Press.
- Walth, Brent (1994). Fire at Eden's Gate: Tom McCall and the Oregon Story. Portland, OR.: Oregon Historical Society Press. ISBN 0-87595-247-X.

== Culture ==
- Bingham, Edwin R. (1993). William G. Robbins; Robert Frank; Richard Ross (eds.). Pacific Northwest Writing: Reaching for Regional Identity. Regionalism and the Pacific Northwest. Corvallis, OR.: Oregon State University Press.
- Dodds, Gordon B. (1993). Varieties of Hope: An Anthology of Oregon Prose. Corvallis, OR.: Oregon State University Press. ISBN 978-0-87071-374-3.
- Turnbull, George S. (1939). History of Oregon Newspapers. Portland, OR.: Binfords & Mort, Publishers.

== Social history ==
- Booth, Brian, ed. (1992). Wildmen, Wobblies, and Whistle Punks: Stewart Holbrook's Lowbrow Northwest. Corvallis, OR.: Oregon State University Press. ISBN 0-87071-383-3.
- Edson, Christopher J. (1974). Chinese in Eastern Oregon 1860-1890. San Francisco, CA.: R. and E. Research Association. ISBN 0-88247-238-0.
- Lowenstein, Steven (1987). The Jews of Oregon 1850-1950. Portland, OR.: Jewish Historical Society of Oregon. ISBN 0-9619786-0-0.
- Mclagan, Elizabeth (2022). A Peculiar Paradise: A History of Blacks in Oregon, 1788-1940 (2nd ed.). Corvallis, OR: Oregon State University Press in Cooperation with Oregon Black Pioneers. ISBN 9780870712210. OCLC 1341845615.
- Nakata, Deena K. (1995). The Gift: The Oregon Nikkei Story Retold. Portland, OR: Deena K. Nakata.
- Ward, Jean M.; Elaine A. Maveety, eds. (1995). Pacific Northwest Women 1815-1925: Lives, Memories, and Writings. Corvallis, OR: Oregon State University Press. ISBN 0-87071-387-6.

== Geology ==
- Bishop, Ellen Morris (2006). In Search of Ancient Oregon: A Geological and Natural History. Portland, OR: Timber Press. ISBN 0-88192-789-9.
- Wagner, Parke D. Jr.; Snavely, Holly C. (1963). Tertiary Geologic History of Western Oregon & Washington. State of Washington.
- Williams, Ira A. (1991). Geologic History of the Columbia River Gorge, As Interpreted from the Historic Columbia River Scenic Highway. Portland, OR: Oregon Historical Society Press. ISBN 0-87595-223-2.

== Journals ==
- "About the Oregon Historical Quarterly". Oregon Historical Quarterly. 1900-Present. Portland, OR: Oregon Historical Society.

== Bibliographies ==
- "Reading the Region: Bibliography". University of Washington, Seattle WA: Center for the Study of the Pacific Northwest.

== Websites ==
- Oregon Encyclopedia, a peer-reviewed project of the Portland State University history department and others

== See also ==
- American frontier
- Bibliography of the Western United States
- Bibliography of Montana history
- Bibliography of Idaho history
- Bibliography of Wyoming history
- List of bibliographies on American history
