= Bibliography of North Dakota history =

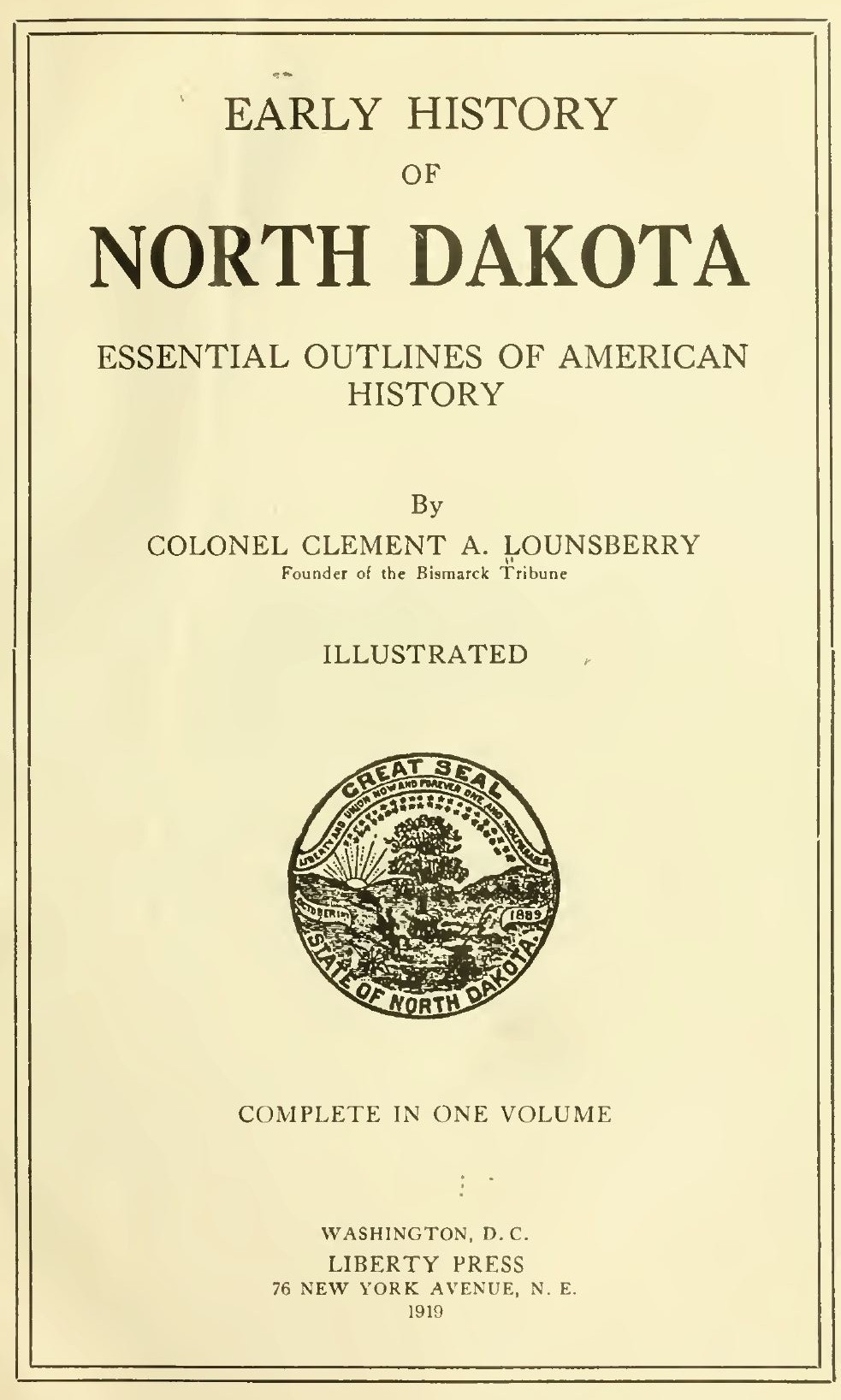
Early History of North Dakota

The following works deal with the cultural, political, economic, military, biographical and geologic history of pre-territorial North Dakota, Dakota Territory and the State of North Dakota.

== Surveys of North Dakota history ==
- Compendium history and biography of North Dakota; a history of early settlement, political history, and biography; reminiscences of pioneer life (PDF). Chicago: Geo A. Ogle. 1900.
- Crawford, Lewis F. (1931). History of North Dakota (3 volumes). Chicago, IL: The American Historical Society.
- Lamar, Howard R. (1956). Dakota Territory, 1861–1889: A Study of Frontier Politics. New Haven, CT: Yale University Press.
- Lounsberry, Clement (1919). Early History of North Dakota, Essential Outlines of American History (PDF). Washington D.C.: Liberty Press.
- Lysengen, Janet Daley; Rathke, Ann M., eds. (1996). The Centennial Anthology of North Dakota History: Journal of the Northern Plains. State Historical Society of North Dakota. ISBN 5-555-55489-3.
- Peirce, Neal R. (1973). "North Dakota". The Great Plains States of America: People, Politics, and Power in the Nine Great Plains States. W. W. Norton & Company. ISBN 0-393-34274-3.
- Robinson, Elwyn B.; D. Jerome Tweton; David B. Danbom (1995). History of North Dakota. Fargo, ND: North Dakota State University Institute for Regional Studies. ISBN 0-911042-43-1.
- Tweton, D. Jerome; Jelliff, Theodore B. (1976). North Dakota: The Heritage of a People. North Dakota State University. ISBN 0-911042-19-9.
- Wilkins, Robert P.; Wilkins, Wynona Hutchette. (1977). North Dakota: A Bicentennial History. WW Norton & Co. ISBN 0-393-05655-4.
- Wishart, David J., ed. (2004). Encyclopedia of the Great Plains. University of Nebraska Press. ISBN 0-8032-4787-7.
- Federal Writers Project (1972). North Dakota: A Guide to the Northern Prairie State. Oxford University Press. ISBN 0-403-02183-9.

== Historic expeditions ==
- Bray, Edmund C.; Bray, Martha Coleman (1993). Joseph N. Nicollet on the Plains and Prairies: The Expeditions of 1838–39 With Journals, Letters, and Notes on the Dakota Indians. Minnesota Historical Society Press. ISBN 0-87351-290-1.
- Jenkinson, Clay S. (2002). A Lewis and Clark Chapbook; Lewis and Clark in North Dakota. Bismarck, ND: The North Dakota Humanities Council. ISBN 0-9654579-4-X.
- Laut, Agnes C. (1926). The Blazed Trail of the Old Frontier, Being the Log of the Upper Missouri Historical Expedition under the Auspices of the Governors & Historical Associations of Minnesota, North and South Dakota and Montana for 1925. New York: Robert M. McBride and Company.

== Business, industry and labor ==
- Drache, Hiram M. (1964). The Day of the Bonanza; a History of Bonanza Farming in the Red River Valley of the North. Fargo, ND: North Dakota Institute for Regional Studies.
- Hargreaves, Mary W. M. (1993). Dry Farming in the Northern Great Plains: Years of Readjustment, 1920–1990. University Press of Kansas. ISBN 0-7006-0553-3.
- Junker, Rozanne Enerson. (1989). The Bank of North Dakota: An Experiment in State Ownership. Santa Barbara, CA: Fiftian Press. ISBN 0-931832-29-2.
- Tauxe, Caroline S. (1993). Farms, Mines and Main Streets: Uneven Development in a Dakota County. Temple University Press. ISBN 1-56639-070-2.

== Native American histories ==
- Heard, Issac V. D. (1865). History of the Sioux War and massacres of 1862 and 1863 (PDF). New York: Harper and Brothers.
- Schneider, Mary Jane. (1986). North Dakota Indians: An Introduction. Kendall Hunt Pub Co. ISBN 0-8403-9615-5.

== Military histories ==
- Cooper, Jerry; Smith, Glen (2005). Citizens as Soldiers: A History of the North Dakota National Guard. Lincoln, NE: University of Nebraska Press. ISBN 0-8032-6449-6.

== Local and regional histories ==
- History of North Dakota's first industrial exposition held at Bismarck, North Dakota, September 24th to October 15th (PDF). Bismarck Tribune. 1911.
- History of the Red River Valley: past and present, including an account of the counties, cities, towns, and villages of the Valley from the time of their first settlement and formation (Volume 1) (PDF). Chicago: C. F. Cooper. 1909.
  - Volume 2
- Arnold, Henry Vernon (1921). Forty years in North Dakota in relation to Grand Forks County (PDF). Latimore, ND: H.V. Arnold.
- Danbom, David B. (2005). Going It Alone: Fargo Grapples with the Great Depression. Minnesota Historical Society Press. ISBN 0-87351-546-3.
- Danbom, David B. (1990). Our Purpose Is to Serve: The First Century of the North Dakota Agricultural Experiment Station. Fargo, ND: North Dakota State University. ISBN 0-911042-38-5.
- Eisenberg, C. G. (1982). History of the First Dakota-District of the Evangelical-Lutheran Synod of Iowa and Other States. University Press of America. ISBN 0-8191-2798-1.
- Gieger, Louis G. (1958). University Of The Northern Plains: A History Of The University Of North Dakota, 1883–1958. Grand Forks, ND: University of North Dakota Press.
- Hudson, John C. (1985). Plains Country Towns. University of Minnesota Press. ISBN 0-8166-1348-6.
- Snortland, J. Signe, ed. (1996). A Traveler's Companion to North Dakota State Historic Sites. State Historical Society of North Dakota. ISBN 1-891419-23-4.
- Stock, Catherine McNicol. (1992). Main Street in Crisis: The Great Depression and the Old Middle Class on the Northern Plains. University of North Carolina Press. ISBN 0-8078-2011-3.
- Trinka, Zina Irma (1920). Out Where the West Begins: Being the Early and Romantic History of North Dakota. St. Paul, MN: The Pioneer Company.
- Young, Carrie (1993). Prairie Cooks: Glorified Rice, Three-Day Buns, and Other Reminiscences. Harper Collins. ISBN 978-0-06-092776-9.

=== Ghost towns ===
- Brouald, Ken C. (1999). Silent Towns on the Prairie : North Dakota's Disappearing Towns and Farms. Pictorial Histories Publishing Co. ISBN 1-57510-048-7.

== Natural histories ==
- Fred B. Samson; Fritz L. Knopf, eds. (August 1996). Prairie Conservation: Preserving North America's Most Endangered Ecosystem. Island Press. ISBN 1-55963-428-6.
- Young, Robert T. (1924). The life of Devils Lake, North Dakota (PDF). North Dakota Biological Station.

== Biographies ==
- Life of Thomas Hawley Canfield; his early efforts to open a route for the transportation of the products of the West to New England, by way of the Great Lakes, St. Lawrence River, and Vermont railroads, and his connection with the early history of the Northern Pacific Railroad, from the history of the Red River Valley, North Dakota and park region of northwestern Minnesota (PDF). Burlington, VT. 1889.
- Blackorby, Edward C (1963). Prairie Rebel: The Public Life of William Lemke. Lincoln, NE: University of Nebraska Press.
- Collins, Michael L (1989). That Damned Cowboy: Theodore Roosevelt and the American West, 1883–1898. Peter Lang Publishers. ISBN 0-8204-1004-7.
- Smith, Glen H. (1979). Langer of North Dakota: A Study in Isolationism, 1940–1959. New York: Garland Publishers.

=== Memoirs, diaries and journals ===
- Carver, Jonathan (1802). Three years travels throughout the interior parts of North America, for more than five thousand miles, containing an account of the Great lakes, and all the lakes, islands, and rivers...of the north west regions of that vast continent... Together with a concise history of the genius, manners, and customs of the Indians inhabiting the lands adjacent to the heads and to the westward of the great river Mississippi: and an appendix, describing the uncultivated parts of America, that are the most proper for forming settlements. Boston: Samuel Etheridge for West and Greenleaf.
- Wied, Maximilian (2001). Travels in the Interior of North America in the years 1832 to 1834. Taschen. ISBN 3-8228-1245-5.

== Political histories ==
- Howard, Thomas W., ed. (1981). The North Dakota Political Tradition. Iowa State University Press. ISBN 0-8138-0520-1.
- Morlan, Robert L. (1955). Political Prairie Fire: The Nonpartisan League, 1915–1922. University of Minnesota Press.
- University of North Dakota; Bureau of Governmental Affairs, eds. (1979). A Compilation of North Dakota Political Party Platforms, 1884–1978. University of North Dakota, Bureau of Governmental Affairs.

== Social history ==
- Arends, Shirley Fischer (1989). The Central Dakota Germans: Their History, Language, and Culture. Washington, D.C.: Georgetown University Press. ISBN 0-87840-198-9.
- Benson, Bjorn; Hampsten, Elizabeth; Sweney, Kathryn, eds. (1988). Day In, Day Out: Women's Lives in North Dakota. University of North Dakota. ISBN 0-9608700-2-4.
- Berg, Francie M., ed. (1983). Ethnic Heritage in North Dakota. Heathway. ISBN 0-918532-13-2.
- Ginsburg, Faye D. (1989). Contested Lives: The Abortion Debate in an American Community [Fargo, ND]. University of California Press. ISBN 0-520-21735-7.
- Lindgren, H. Elaine (1996). Land in Her Own Name: Women as Homesteaders in North Dakota. University of Oklahoma Press. ISBN 0-8061-2886-0.
- Sherman, William C.; Thorson, Playford V., eds. (1988). Plains Folk: North Dakota's Ethnic History. North Dakota State University. ISBN 0-911042-35-0.
- Sherman, William C. (1983). Prairie Mosaic: An Ethnic Atlas of Rural North Dakota. North Dakota State University. ISBN 0-911042-27-X.

== Geology ==
- Willard, Daniel E. (1903). The story of the prairies; or, The landscape geology of North Dakota (PDF). Chicago: Rand, McNally and Company.

== Journals ==
- Collections of the State Historical Society of North Dakota (Volume 1) (PDF). State Historical Society of North Dakota. 1906.
  - Volume 2, 1908
  - Volume 4, 1915
  - Volume 6, 1920

== Bibliographies ==
- Budge, Chrissie (1959). Bibliography of the Geology and Natural Resources of North Dakota 1814 - 1944 with Supplements - One and Two. North Dakota Geological Survey.
- Scott, Mary Woods (1981). Annotated Bibliography Of The Geology Of North Dakota 1960–1979. North Dakota Geological Survey.
- "Summary of North Dakota History-Conclusion and Bibliography". North Dakota State Government.

== See also ==
- Bibliography of Montana history
- Bibliography of the Lewis and Clark Expedition
- List of bibliographies on American history
