= List of bibliographies on Canadian history =

The list of bibliographies on Canadian history is a stand alone list of bibliographies about the history of the Canada, intended as a quick reference. The bibliographies listed here are devoted only to general subjects in Canadian history, i.e. prime ministers, major wars, etc. The following entries are mainly compiled in 2011 from the Canadiana : the national bibliography with arbitrary additions since then.

== General ==
- Bibliography of Canadian history
- Bibliography of Canadian military history
- Bibliography of science and technology in Canada
- Bibliography of the 1837-1838 insurrections in Lower Canada
- List of books about prime ministers of Canada

== Provincial ==
- Bibliography of Alberta history
- Bibliography of British Columbia
- Bibliography of New Brunswick
- Bibliography of Nova Scotia
- Bibliography of Saskatchewan history
- Bibliography of Ontario

== See also ==
- Outline of Canada
- Bibliography of World War I
- Bibliography of World War II
- List of bibliographies on American history
