= Bibliography of Idaho history =

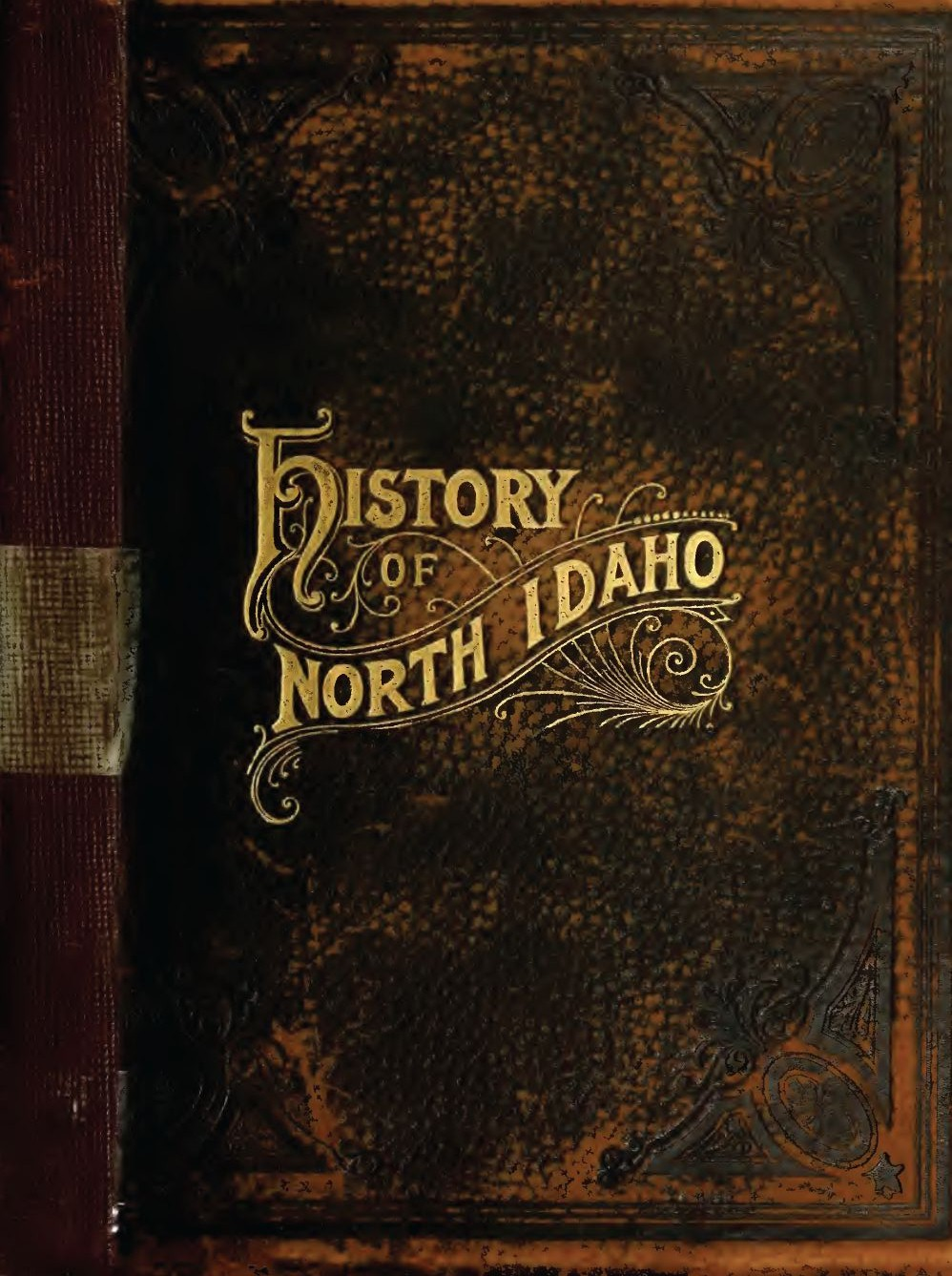
History of North Idaho (1903)

The following works deal with the cultural, political, economic, military, biographical and geologic history of pre-territorial Idaho, Idaho Territory and the State of Idaho.

== Surveys of Idaho history ==
- Aiken, Katherine; Kevin R. Marsh; Laura Woodworth-Ney (2006). Idaho: The Heroic Journey. Cherbo Publishing Group. ISBN 1-882933-73-7.
- Bancroft, Hubert Howe (1890). The History of Washington, Idaho and Montana (1845-1889) Vol XXXI. San Francisco, CA: The History Company.
- Bronsan, Cornelius J. (1918). History of the state of Idaho. New York: C. Scribner's sons.
- Idaho: The Place and Its People; a History of the Gem State from Prehistoric to Present Days: 3 Volumes. Chicago: American Historical Society. 1933.
- Elliott, Wallace W. (1884). History of Idaho Territory Showing Its Resources and Advantages; With Illustrations Descriptive of Its Scenery, Residences, Farms, Mines, Mills. San Francisco: Ye Galleon Press.
- Fisher, Vardis, ed. (1938). The Idaho Encyclopedia:Federal Writers' Project of the Works Progress Administration. Works Progress Administration.
- French, Hiram T. (1914). History of Idaho: a narrative account of its historical progress, its people and its principal interests (PDF). Chicago: Lewis Pub. Co. Volume 2,
- Hailey, John (1910). The history of Idaho (PDF). Boise, ID: Press of Syms-York Company, Inc.
- Hawley, James Henry (1920). History of Idaho, the gem of the mountains (Volume 1) (PDF). Chicago: The S. J. Clarke publishing company. Volume 2, Volume 3, Volume 4
- McConnell, William John (1913). Early history of Idaho (PDF). Caldwell, ID: Caxton Press.
- Schwantes, Carlos Arnaldo (1991). In Mountain Shadows: A History of Idaho. Lincoln, NE: University of Nebraska Press. ISBN 0-8032-9241-4.

== Historic expeditions ==
- Engelmann, George; Forwood, William Henry; Gray, Asa; Gregory, James F.; Sheridan, Philip Henry (1882). Report of an exploration of parts of Wyoming, Idaho, and Montana in August and September, 1882 /made by Lieut. Gen. P. H. Sheridan, commanding the Military division of the Missouri, with the itinerary of Col. Jas. F. Gregory, and a geological and botanical report by W. H. Forwood (PDF). Washington D.C.: U.S. Government Printing Office.
- Mattes, Merrill J. (1970). Colter's Hell & Jackson's Hole: The Fur Trapper's Exploration of the Yellowstone and Grand Teton Park Region. Gardiner, MT: Yellowstone Library and Museum Association and Grand Teton Natural History Association.
- Work, John (1923). Lewis, William S.; Paul C. Phillips (eds.). The Journal of John Work, A Chief Trader of the Hudson's Bay Co., During His Expedition From Vancouver to the Flatheads and Blackfeet of the Pacific Northwest. Cleveland: The Arthur H. Clark Company.

=== Hayden Geological Survey (1871) ===
- Hayden, F. V. (1880). The Great West: Its Attractions and Resources, Containing a Popular Description of the Marvelous Scenery, Physical Geography, Fossils and Glaciers of the Wonderful Region, and the Recent Explorations of the Yellowstone Park, "The Wonderland of America". Bloomington, IL: Charles R. Brodix.
- Merrill, Marlene Deahl, ed. (1999). Yellowstone and the Great West-Journals, Letters and Images from the 1871 Hayden Expedition. Lincoln, NE: University of Nebraska Press. ISBN 0-8032-3148-2.

=== Lewis and Clark Expedition (1804–1806) ===
- Ambrose, Stephen E. (1996). Undaunted Courage. New York: Simon & Schuster. ISBN 0-684-81107-3.
- Russell, Steve F. (2007). Lewis and Clark Across the Mountains: Mapping the Corps of Discovery in Idaho. Boise, ID: Idaho State Historical Society Press. ISBN 978-0-931406-16-4.

== Business and labor ==
- Aiken, Katherine G. (2005). Idaho's Bunker Hill: the rise and fall of a great mining company, 1885-1981. Norman, OK: University of Oklahoma Press. ISBN 0-8061-3682-0.

== Indians ==
- Arnold, R. Ross (1932). Indian Wars of Idaho. Caldwell, ID: Caxton Press.
- Eells, Myron; George Henry Atkinson (1882). History of Indian missions on the Pacific Coast: Oregon, Washington and Idaho (PDF). Philadelphia: The American Sunday-School Union.
- McBeth (1908). The Nez Perces since Lewis and Clark (PDF). New York: F. H. Revell Co.
- Murphy, Robert F.; Yolanda Murphy (1986). "Northern Shoshone and Bannock". In Warren L. D'Azevedo (ed.). Handbook of North American Indians, Volume 11: Great Basin. Washington, D.C.: Smithsonian Institution. ISBN 978-0-16-004581-3.
- Franklin County Historical Society (Idaho) (1917). The passing of the redman, being a succinct account of the last battle that wrested Idaho from the bondage of the Indians (PDF). Preston, ID: Franklin County Historical Society and Monument Committee.

== Military histories ==
- Brown, Colonel W. C. (1926). The Sheepeater Campaign: Idaho 1879. Idaho Historical Society.
- Greene, Jerome A. (2000). Nez Perce Summer-The U.S. Army and the Nee-Me-Poo Crisis. Helena, MT: Montana Historical Society Press. ISBN 0-917298-68-3.
- Hampton, Bruce (1994). Children of Grace-The Nez Perce War of 1877. New York: Henry Holt and Company. ISBN 0-8050-1991-X.
- Kip, Lawrence (1859). Army Life on the Pacific; A Journal of the Expedition Against the Northern Indians, the Tribes of the Coeur D'Alenes, Spokans, and Pelouzes, in the Summer of 1858. New York: Redfield.
- West, Elliott (2009). The last Indian war: the Nez Perce story. Oxford: Oxford University Press. ISBN 978-0-19-513675-3.

=== Primary sources ===
- Miles, Nelson A. (1896). Personal Reflections and Observations of Nelson A. Miles. Chicago: The Werner Company.
- Report of special commissioners J. W. Powell and G. W. Ingalls on the condition of the Ute Indians of Utah; the Pai-Utes of Utah, northern Arizona, southern Nevada, and southeastern California; the Go-si Utes of Utah and Nevada; the northwestern Shoshones of Idaho and Utah; and the western Shoshones of Nevada (PDF) (Report). U.S. Bureau of Indian Affairs. 1873.

== Local and regional histories ==
- Beal, Merrill D.) (1942). History of Southeastern Idaho. Caldwell, ID: Caxton Press.
- Elsensohn, Sister M. Alfreda (1947). Pioneer Days in Idaho County. Cladwell, ID: Claxton Press.
- Russell, Bert (1978). Hardships and Happy Times in Idaho's St. Joe Wilderness as Told By the Old Timers. Harrison, ID: Lacon Publishers. ISBN 0-930344-04-9.
- Vardis Fisher, ed. (1937). Idaho: A Guide in Word and Picture: Federal Writers' Project of the Works Progress Administration. Works Progress Administration.
- An illustrated history of north Idaho: embracing Nez Perces, Idaho, Latah, Kootenai and Shoshone counties, state of Idaho (PDF). Western Historical Pub. Co. 1903.

== Law and order ==
- Langford, Nathaniel Pitt (1893). Vigilante Days and Ways-The Pioneers of the Rockies-the makers and making of Montana, Idaho, Oregon, Washington, and Wyoming (PDF). New York: D. D. Merrill.

== Ghost towns ==
- Florin, Lambert (1971). Montana, Idaho and Wyoming: Ghost Towns. Seattle: Superior Publishing Company.
- Webb, Todd (1961). Gold Strikes and Ghost Towns. Garden City, NJ: Doubleday and Co.
- Weis, Norman D. (1972). Ghost Towns of the Northwest. Caldwell, ID: University of Nebraska Press for Caxton Press. ISBN 0-87004-201-7.

== Biographies ==
- Ashby, Leroy (1994). Fighting the Odds: The Life of Senator Frank Church. Pullman, WA: Washington State University Press. ISBN 978-0-87422-103-9.
- The Historical Encyclopedia of Wyoming. Cheyenne, WY: Wyoming Historical Institute. 1970.
- Mumey, Nolie (1972). The Life Of Jim Baker 1818-1898. New York: Interland Publishing.
- Scherer, Joanna Cohan (2006). A Danish Photographer of Idaho Indians: Benedicte Wrensted. Norman, OK: University of Oklahoma Press. ISBN 978-0-8061-3684-4.
- Scott, Kim Allen (2007). Yellowstone Denied-The Life of Gustavus Cheyney Doane. Norman, OK: University of Oklahoma Press. ISBN 978-0-8061-3800-8.
- Smallwood, William L. (2007). Mcclure of Idaho. Caldwell, ID: Caxton Press. ISBN 978-0-87004-458-8.

=== Memoirs and primary sources ===
- Bonney, Orrin H.; Bonney, Lorraine (1970). Battle Drums and Geysers-The Life and Journals of Lt. Gustavus Cheyney Doane, Soldier and Explorer of the Yellowstone and Snake River Regions. Chicago: Swallow Press.
- Taylor, Glen Hearst (1979). The Way It Was With Me. L. Stuart. ISBN 0-8184-0288-1.

== Political histories ==
- Colson, Dennis C. (1991). Idaho's Constitution: The Tie That Binds. Caldwell, ID: Caxton Press. ISBN 0-89301-265-3.
- Limbaugh, Ronald H. (1982). Rocky Mountain Carpetbaggers: Idaho's Territorial Governors, 1863-1890. Moscow, ID: Idaho Research Foundation. ISBN 0-89301-082-0.
- Stapilis, Randy (2005). Governing Idaho: Politics, People, and Power. Caldwell, ID: Caxton Press. ISBN 0-87004-447-8.
- Stapilis, Randy (2009). Paradox Politics: People and Power in Idaho. Carlton, OR: Ridenbaugh Press. ISBN 978-0-9824668-0-3.

== Social history ==
- Fetherling, Douglas (1988). The Gold Crusades: A social history of the gold rushes 1849-1929. Toronto, ON: University of Toronto Press. ISBN 0-8020-8046-4.
- Johnstone, Rachel S. (2009). Inmates of the Idaho Penitentiary 1864-1947. Idaho State Historical Society Press.

== Geology ==
- Eldridge, George Homans (1895). A geological reconnaissance across Idaho (PDF) (Report). U.S. Geological Survey Annual Report. 16.
- Lindgren, Waldemar (1898). The mining districts of the Idaho basin and the Boise ridge, Idaho (PDF). Washington D.C.: U.S. Government Printing Office.

== See also ==
- Bibliography of Montana history
- Bibliography of Wyoming history
- Bibliography of Yellowstone National Park
- List of bibliographies on American history

== Bibliographies ==
- American Imprints No. 13: A Checklist of Idaho Imprints (1838-1890). American Imprints Inventory. Chicago: WPA Historical Records Survey. 1940.
- Rees, John E. (1918). Idaho chronology, nomenclature, bibliography (PDF). Chicago: W.B. Conkey Co.
- Idaho Bibliography Project (uidaho.edu)
- Idaho State Guide: Print Bibliography (loc.gov)
- Peterson, C. Stewart. (1961). "Idaho" Consolidated bibliography of county histories in fifty States. 2d ed. Baltimore: Genealogical Pub. Co.. pp. 27–28
- Idaho Federal Writers' Project (1937). "A Selected Bibliography". Idaho, a guide in word and picture. Prelinger Library. Caldwell, Idaho: Caxton Printers. pp. 415–418.
