= Bibliography of American Civil War homefront =

Books about the American Civil War

The American Civil War bibliography comprises books that deal in large part with the American Civil War. There are over 60,000 books on the war, with more appearing each month. There is no complete bibliography to the war; the largest guide to books is over 40 years old and lists over 6,000 titles selected by leading scholars. Many specialized topics such as Abraham Lincoln, women, and medicine have their own lengthy bibliographies. The books on major campaigns typically contain their own specialized guides to the sources and literature. The most comprehensive guide to the historiography annotates over a thousand titles.

For the history of North and South see Union (American Civil War) and Confederate States of America and the many articles linked there.

For a guide to the bibliography see:

- *Woodworth, Steven E.; ed. The American Civil War: A Handbook of Literature and Research. Greenwood Press, 1996.
- Eicher, David J. The Civil War in Books An Analytical Bibliography. 1997.
- Murdock, Eugene C. Civil War in the North: A Selected, Annotated Bibliography. Garland, 1987.

For a guide to web sources see:

- Carter, Alice E.; Jensen, Richard. The Civil War on the Web: A Guide to the Very Best Sites—Completely Revised and Updated. 2003.

Note: This article forms part of Bibliography of the American Civil War.

== Overviews ==
- Current, Richard N., et al. eds. Encyclopedia of the Confederacy (1993) (4 Volume set; also 1 vol abridged version) (ISBN 0-13-275991-8)
- Heidler, David and Jeanne Heidler, eds, Encyclopedia of the American Civil War: A Political, Social, and Military History (2002) 2740pp
- Nevins, Allan. Ordeal of the Union (1970), vol 5. The Improvised War, 1861–1862; vo 6. War Becomes Revolution, 1862–1863; vol 7. The Organized War, 1863–1864; vol 8. The Organized War to Victory, 1864–1865; highly detailed coverage by a leading scholar.
- Resch, John P. et al., Americans at War: Society, Culture and the Homefront vol 2: 1816-1900 (2005)

=== Soldiers of both sides ===
- Carmichael, Peter S. The War for the Common Soldier: How Men Thought, Fought, and Survived in Civil War Armies (UNC Press Books, 2018). online
- Frank, Joseph Allan, and George A. Reaves, eds. Seeing the Elephant: Raw Recruits at the Battle of Shiloh (University of Illinois Press, 2003) online
- Hesseltine, William Best, ed. Civil War Prisons. (Kent State University Press, 1972).
- Linderman, Gerald. Embattled Courage: The Experience of Combat in the American Civil War (Free Press, 1987)
- Livermore, Thomas Leonard. Numbers and Losses in the Civil War in America, 1861-65 (Houghton, Mifflin, 1900). online
- McPherson, James M. For Cause and Comrades: Why Men Fought in the Civil War (Oxford University Press, 1997) online
- Manning, Chandra. What This Cruel War Was Over. (Vintage, 2007) Uses letters, diaries, and regimental newspapers to probe the world view of soldiers—black and white, Yankee and Rebel. interview with author
- Mitchell, Reid. Civil War Soldiers: Their Expectations and Their Experiences (Penguin, 1997).
- Robertson, James I. Soldiers Blue and Gray (U of South Carolina Press, 1988).
- Sheehan-Dean, Aaron, ed. The View from the Ground: Experiences of Civil War Soldiers (University Press of Kentucky, 2006). online
- Shively, Kathryn J. Nature's Civil War: Common Soldiers and the Environment in 1862 Virginia (UNC Press Books, 2013). online

== Union homefront ==
- Bak, Richard. A Distant Thunder: Michigan in the Civil War. Chelsea: Huron River, 2004.
- Berstein, Iver. The New York City Draft Riots: Their Significance for American Society and Politics in the Age of the Civil War. London: Oxford University Press, 1990.
- Gallman, J. Matthew, The North Fights the Civil War: The Home Front, Chicago: Ivan R. Dee, 1994.
- Geary, James W. We Need Men: The Union Draft Riot in the Civil War. DeKalb, Illinois: Northern Illinois University Press, 1991.
- Green, Michael S. Freedom, Union, and Power: Lincoln and His Party during the Civil War. Fordham University Press, 2004.
- Hess, Earl J. Liberty, Virtue, and Progress: Northerners and Their War for the Union. New York: New York University Press, 1988.
- Mitchell, Charles W. "Maryland Voices of the Civil War," 2007.
- Onuf, Nicholas and Onuf, Peter. Nations, Markets, and War: Modern History and the American Civil War. University of Virginia Press, 2006.
- Paludan, Philip S. The Presidency of Abraham Lincoln. 1994.
- Paludan, Philip S. A People's Contest: The Union and Civil War, 1861-1865 (1996), detailed scholarly history
- Richardson, Heather Cox. The Greatest Nation of the Earth: Republican Economic Policies during the Civil War. 1997.
- Schecter, Barnet. The Devil's Own Work: The Civil War Draft Riots and the Fight to Reconstruct America. Walker Publishing Company, 2005.
- Smith, Michael Thomas. The Enemy Within: Fears of Corruption in the Civil War North. University of Virginia Press, 2011.
- Stampp, Kenneth M. Indiana Politics during the Civil War, 2nd edition. Bloomington, Indiana: Indiana University Press, 1978.
- Thornton, Mark and Ekelund, Robert B., Jr. Tariffs, Blockades, and Inflation: The Economics of the Civil War. Scholarly Resources, 2004.
- Williams, David. A People's History of the Civil War: Struggles for the Meaning of Freedom. New York: The New Press, 2005.
- Wilson, Mark R. The Business of Civil War: Military Mobilization and the State, 1861-1865. Johns Hopkins U. Press, 2006.

=== Union politics ===
- Benton, Josiah Henry. Voting in the Field: A Forgotten Chapter of the Civil War. Boston, Massachusetts: privately published, 1915.
- Gray, Wood. The Hidden Civil War: The Story of the Copperheads. New York: Viking Press, 1942.
- Johnson, David Allen. Decided on the Battlefield: Grant, Sherman, Lincoln and the Election of 1864. Amherst, New York: Prometheus Books, 2010.
- Klement, Frank L. The Copperheads of the Middle West. Chicago, Illinois: University of Chicago Press, 1960
- Nelson, Larry E. Bullets, Ballots, and Rhetoric: Confederate Policy for the United States Presidential Contest of 1864. University, Alabama: University of Alabama Press, 1980.
- Silby, Joel H. A Respectable Minority: The Democratic Party in the Civil War Era, 1860-1868. New York: Norton, 1977.
- Waugh, John C. Reelecting Lincoln: The Battle for the 1864 Presidency. New York: Crown Publishers, 1998.
- Weber, Jennifer L. Copperheads: The Rise and Fall of Lincoln's Opponents in the North. New York: Oxford University Press, 2006.

=== Union civilian leaders ===
- Abbott, R. H. Ohio's Civil War Governors. Columbus, Ohio: no publisher listed, 1962.
- Ambler, Charles H. Francis H. Pierpont: Union War Governor of Virginia and Father of West Virginia. University of North Carolina Press, 1937.
- Cook, Robert J. Civil War Senator: William Pitt Fessenden and the Fight to Save the American Republic. Baton Rouge, Louisiana: Louisiana State University Press, 2011.
- Goodwin, Doris K., Team of Rivals: The Political Genius of Abraham Lincoln. 2005.
- Hoogenboom, Ari. Gustavius Vasa Fox of the Union Navy: A Biography. Baltimore, Maryland: Johns Hopkins University Press, 2008.
- Niven, John. Gideon Welles: Lincoln's Secretary of the Navy. New York: Oxford University Press, 1973.
- Parrish, William E. Frank Blair: Lincoln's Conservative. Columbia, Missouri: University of Missouri Press, 1998. ISBN 0-8262-1156-9.
- Plummer, Mark. Frontier Governor: Samuel J. Crawford of Kansas. Lawrence, Kansas: 1971.
- Steele, Janet E. The Sun Shines for All: Journalism and Ideology in the Life of Charles A. Dana. Syracuse, New York: Syracuse University Press, 1993.
- Thomas, Benjamin P. and Harold M. Hyman. Stanton: The Life and Times of Lincoln's Secretary of War. New York: Alfred Knopf, 1962.
- Vallandigham, James L. A Life of Clement L. Vallandigham. Baltimore, Maryland: no publisher listed, 1872.
- Waller, John L. Colossal Hamilton of Texas: A Biography of Andrew Jackson Hamilton, Militant Unionist and Reconstruction Governor. El Paso, Texas: Texas Western Press, 1968.
- Wardin, Robert B. An Account of the Private Life and Public Service of Salmon Portland Chase. Cincinnati, Ohio: Wilstach, Baldwin and Co., 1874.
- West, Jr., Richard S. Gideon Welles: Lincoln's Navy Department. New York: Bobbs–Merrill Company, 1943.

=== Abraham Lincoln ===
- Barr, John McKee. Loathing Lincoln: An American Tradition From the Civil War to the Present. Baton Rouge, Louisiana: Louisiana State University Press, 2014. ISBN 978-0-8071-5383-3.
- Boritt, Gabor S. ed. Lincoln the War President (1994)
- Boritt, Gabor S. and Norman O. Forness, eds. The Historian's Lincoln: Pseudohistory: Psychohistory, and History. Urbana, Illinois: University of Illinois State, 1988. ISBN 0-252-01527-4.
- Brookhiser, Richard. Founders' Son: A Life of Abraham Lincoln. Basic Books, 2014.
- Burton, Orville V. The Essential Lincoln: Speeches and Correspondence. New York: Hill & Wang, 2009. ISBN 978-0-8090-4307-1.
- Carwardine, Richard. Lincoln: A Life of Purpose and Power ISBN 1-4000-4456-1 (2003)
- DiLorenzo, Thomas J. The Real Lincoln: A New Look at Abraham Lincoln, His Agenda, and an Unnecessary War. Roseville, California: Forum, 2002. attack on Lincoln from Libertarian economist
- Donald, David. Lincoln (1999) ISBN 0-684-82535-X, Major scholarly biography
- Foner, Eric. The Fiery Trial: Abraham Lincoln and American Slavery New York: W.W. Norton & Co., 2011.
- Foner, Eric, ed. Our Lincoln: New Perspectives on Lincoln and His World. New York: W.W. Norton & Company, 2008. ISBN 978-0-393-06756-9.
- Gienapp, William E. Abraham Lincoln and Civil War America: A Biography 2002. ISBN 0-19-515099-6.
- Goodrich, Thomas. The Darkest Dawn: Lincoln, Booth, and the Great American Tragedy. (Indiana UP, 2005). ISBN 0-253-32599-4.
- Goodwin, Doris. Team of Rivals: The Political Genius of Abraham Lincoln. New York: Simon & Schuster, 2005. ISBN 0-7432-7075-4.
- Guelzo, Allen C. Abraham Lincoln: Redeemer President, (1999). ISBN 0-8028-3872-3.
- Holzer, Harold. Lincoln President–Elect: Abraham Lincoln and the Great Secession Winter 1860–1861. New York: Simon & Schuster, 2008. ISBN 978-0-7432-8947-4.
- Holzer, Harold, Craig L. Symonds, and Frank J. Williams, eds. The Lincoln Assassination: Crime and Punishment, Myth & Memory. Fordham University Press, 2010.
- McPherson, James M. Abraham Lincoln and the Second American Revolution. 1992.
- McPherson, James M. Tried by War: Abraham Lincoln as Commander in Chief. New York: Penguin Books, 2008. ISBN 978-1-4406-5245-5.
- Miers, Earl S., ed. Lincoln Day by Day: A Chronology: 1809–1865, three volumes. Washington, D.C.: Lincoln Sesquicentennial Commission, 1960.
- Neely, Mark E. The Abraham Lincoln Encyclopedia. New York: McGraw–Hill, 1984.
- Neely, Mark E. The Last Best Hope of Earth: Abraham Lincoln and the Promise of America. 1993.
- Paludan, Phillip Shaw. The Presidency of Abraham Lincoln. Lawrence, Kansas: University Press of Kansas, 1994. ISBN 0-7006-0671-8. Major scholarly study
- Perret, Geoffrey. Lincoln's War: The Untold Story of America's Greatest President as Commander in Chief. New York: Random House, 2004; Popular history
- Peterson, Merrill D. Lincoln in American Memory. New York: Oxford University Press, 1994.
- Randall, James G. Lincoln the President. four volumes, 1945–55. a major scholarly study.
- Sandburg, Carl. Abraham Lincoln: The War Years, four volumes. New York: Charles Scribner's Sons, 1944.
- Schwartz, Barry. Abraham Lincoln in the Post–Heroic Era: History and Memory in Late Twentieth–Century America. University of Chicago Press, 2009.
- Shaw, Archer H. The Lincoln Encyclopedia. New York: Macmillan, 1950.
- Steers, Jr., Edward. Blood on the Moon: The Assassination of Abraham Lincoln. Lexington, Kentucky: University Press of Kentucky, 2001. ISBN 0-8131-2217-1.
- Tagg, Larry. The Unpopular Mr. Lincoln: The Story of America's Most Reviled President. Savas Beatie, 2009.
- Thomas; Benjamin P. Abraham Lincoln: A Biography (1952) Scholarly biography
- White, Jr. Ronald C. Lincoln: A Biography. New York: Random House, 2009. ISBN 978-1-4000-6499-1.; Scholarly biography
- Wilson, Rufus Rockwell. Lincoln in Caricature. New York: Horizon Press, 1953.

=== Economics ===
- Adams, Sean Patrick. "Wartime Political Economy." in A Companion to the US Civil War (2014): 1073-1086; historiography
- Anderson, J.L. "The Vacant Chair on the Farm: Soldier Husbands, Farm Wives, and the Iowa Home Front, 1861–1865," Annals of Iowa (2007) 66#3 pp 241–265
- Fite, Emerson David. Social and industrial conditions in the North during the Civil War (1910) online edition, old but still useful
- Flaherty, Jane. "'The Exhausted Condition of the Treasury' on the Eve of the Civil War," Civil War History, (2009) 55#2 pp. 244–277 in Project MUSE
- Gates, Paul W. Agriculture and the Civil War (1965)
- Hammond, Bray. Sovereignty and the Empty Purse: Banks and Politics in the Civil War (1970).
- Huston, James L. (1983). "A Political Response to Industrialism: The Republican Embrace of Protectionist Labor Doctrines". The Journal of American History. 70 (1): 35–57. doi:10.2307/1890520. JSTOR 1890520.
- Hyman, Hyman. American Singularity: The 1787 Northwest Ordinance, the 1862 Homestead and Morrill Acts, and the 1944 GI Bill (U of Georgia Press, 2008)
- Lowenstein, Roger. Ways and Means: Lincoln and His Cabinet and the Financing of the Civil War (2022)
- Mitchell, Wesley C. A history of the greenbacks: with special reference to the economic consequences of their issue: 1862–65 (1903)
- Myers, Margaret G. Financial History of the United States (1970) pp 148–97 online
- Niven, John. Salmon P. Chase: a biography (1995)
- Richardson, Heather Cox. The Greatest Nation of the Earth: Republican Economic Policies during the Civil War (1997)
- Studenski, Paul, and Herman E. Kroos. Financial History of the United States: Fiscal, monetary, banking, and tariff, including financial administration and state and local finances (1963) pp 137–160.

=== Union soldiers ===
- Dunkelman, Mark H. Brothers One and All: Esprit De Corps in a Civil War Regiment (LSU Press, 2004) life in the 154th New York Volunteer Infantry. online
- Hargrove, Hondon B. Black Union Soldiers in the Civil War (McFarland, 2003). online
- Jordan, Brian Matthew. Marching Home: Union Veterans and their Unending Civil War (WW Norton & Company, 2015. online
- Jordan, Brian Matthew. A Thousand May Fall: Life, Death, and Survival in the Union Army (Liveright, 2020) online book review
- McConnell, Stuart. "Who Joined the Grand Army? Three Case Studies in the Construction of Union Veteranhood, 1866—1900" in Maris A. Vinovskis, ed. Toward a Social History of the American Civil War (Cambridge UP, 1990) pp.139-170
- Mitchell, Reid. "The Northern Soldier and His Community," in Maris A. Vinovskis, ed. Toward a Social History of the American Civil War (Cambridge UP, 1990) pp. 78-92
- Mitchell, Reid. The vacant chair: The Northern soldier leaves home (Oxford University Press, 1995).

== Confederacy home front ==
- Clampitt, Bradley R. The Confederate Heartland: Military and Civilian Morale in the Western Confederacy. Baton Rouge, Louisiana: Louisiana State University Press, 2011.
- Crofts, Daniel W. Reluctant Confederates: Upper South Unionists in the Secession Crisis. Chapel Hill, North Carolina: University of North Carolina Press, 1989. ISBN 0-8078-1809-7.
- Current, Richard N., et al. eds. Encyclopedia of the Confederacy (1993) (4 Volume set; also 1 vol abridged version)
- Beals, Carleton. War Within a War: The Confederacy Against Itself. New York: Chilton Books, 1965.
- Boritt, Gabor S., et al., Why the Confederacy Lost, 1992.
- Campbell, Jacqueline Glass. When Sherman Marched North from the Sea: Resistance on the Confederate Home Front. Chapel Hill, North Carolina: University of North Carolina Pres, 2003.
- Cisco, Walter Brian. War Crimes Against Southern Civilians. Gretna, Louisiana: Pelican, 2007.
- Clark, James C. Last Train South: The Flight of the Confederate Government from Richmond. Jefferson, North Carolina: McFarland and Company, 1984.
- Coulter, E. Merton. The Confederate States of America, 1861–1865. Baton Rouge, Louisiana: 1950.
- Davis, William C. and Robertson, James I., Jr., eds. Virginia at War, 1861. University Press of Kentucky, 2005.
- Davis, William C. Look Away! A History of the Confederate States of America. New York: Free Press, 2003. ISBN 0-684-86585-8.
- Dyer, Thomas G. Secret Yankees: The Union Circle in Confederate Atlanta. Baltimore, Maryland: Johns Hopkins University Press, 1999.
- Eaton, Clement. A History of the Southern Confederacy, 1954.
- Faust, Drew Gilpin. The Creation of Confederate Nationalism: Ideology and Identity in the Civil War South. Baton Rouge, Louisiana: Louisiana State University Press, 1988.
- Freehling, William W. The South vs. the South: How Anti–Confederate Southerners Shaped the Course of the Civil War. New York: Oxford University Press, 2001.
- Gordon, Lesley J. and Inscoe, John C., eds. Inside the Confederate Nation: Essays in Honor of Emory M. Thomas. Baton Rouge, Louisiana: Louisiana State University Press, 2005.
- Brimley, Mark. The Hard Hand of War: Union Military Policy toward Southern Civilians, 1861-1866. New York: Cambridge University Press, 1995.
- Jones, J. B. A Rebel War Clerk's Diary at the Confederate States Capital. 1935.
- Mackey, Robert R. The Uncivil War: Irregular Warfare in the Upper South, 1861-1865. Norman, Oklahoma: University of Oklahoma Press, 2004.
- Massey, Mary Elizabeth. Ersatz in the Confederacy: Shortages and Substitutions on the Southern Homefront. Columbia, South Carolina: University of South Carolina Press, 1994.
- McCardell, John. The Idea of a Southern Nation: Southern Nationalists and Southern Nationalism, 1830-1860. New York: Norton, 1979.
- McGuire, Hunter and George L. Christian. The Confederate Cause and Conduct in the War Between the States. Richmond, Virginia: 1907.
- Morgan, Chad. Planters' Progress: Modernizing Confederate Georgia. University Press of Florida, 2005.
- Neely, Mark E., Jr., Confederate Bastille: Jefferson Davis and Civil Liberties, 1993.
- Rembert, W. Patrick. Jefferson Davis and His Cabinet, 2014
- Rable, George C., The Confederate Republic: A Revolution against Politics, 1994.
- Resch, John P. et al. eds. Americans at War: Society, Culture and the Homefront vol 2: 1816-1900 (2005)
- Robinson, Jr., William M. Justice in Gray: A History of the Judicial System of the Confederate States. Cambridge, Massachusetts: Harvard University Press, 1941.
- Roland, Charles P. The Confederacy, 1962.
- Rubin, Anne Sarah. A Shattered Nation: The Rise and Fall of the Confederacy, 1861-1868. Chapel Hill, North Carolina: University of North Carolina Press, 2005.
- Stith, Matthew M. Extreme Civil War: Guerrilla Warfare, Environment, and Race on the Trans-Mississippi Frontier. Baton Rouge: Louisiana State University Press, 2016.
- Tatum, Georgia Lee. Disloyalty in the Confederacy. Chapel Hill, North Carolina: University of North Carolina Press, 1934.
- Thomas, Emory M. The Confederacy as a Revolutionary Experience, 1992.
- Thomas, Emory M. Confederate Nation: 1861-1865. 1979.
- Waghelstein, John D. and Chisholm, Donald. "The Road Not Taken: Conflict Termination and Guerrillaism in the American Civil War." Journal of Strategic Studies (2006) 29(5): 871-904. ISSN 0140-2390 Fulltext: in Ebsco
- Wallenstein, Peter and Wyatt-Brown, Bertram, eds. Virginia's Civil War. University Press of Virginia, 2005.
- Williams, David. Bitterly Divided: The South's Inner Civil War. New York: The New Press, 2008.

=== Confederate government and politics ===
- Knight, H. Jackson. Confederate Invention: The Story of the Confederate States Patent Office and Its Inventors. Baton Rouge, Louisiana: Louisiana State University Press, 2011.
- Neely, Jr., Mark E. Southern Rights: Political Prisoners and the Myth of Confederate Constitutionalism. Charlottesville, Virginia: University Press of Virginia, 1999.
- Spaw, Patsy M. The Texas Senate: Civil War to the Eve of Reform, 1861–1889, two volumes. College Station, Texas: Texas A&M University Press, 1999.
- Warner, Ezra J. and Buck Yearns. Biographical Register of the Confederate Congress. Baton Rouge, Louisiana: Louisiana State University Press, 1975.

=== Confederate secret service ===
- Headley, John W. Confederate Operations in Canada and New York. New York: Neale Publishing Company, 1906.
- Tidwell, William A. April '65: Confederate Covert Action in the American Civil War. Kent, Ohio: Kent State University Press, 1995.
- Tidwell, William A., James O. Hall, and David W. Gaddy. Come Retribution: The Confederate Secret Service and the Assassination of Abraham Lincoln. Jackson, Mississippi: University of Mississippi Press, 1989.

=== Confederate civilian leaders ===
- Baylor, George W. John Robert Baylor: Confederate Governor of Arizona, ed. by Odie B. Faulk. Tucson, Arizona: Arizona Pioneers' Historical Society, 1966.
- Boney, Francis N. John Letcher of Virginia: The Story of Virginia's War Governor. University, Alabama: University of Alabama Press, 1966.
- Butler, Pierce. Judah P. Benjamin. Philadelphia, Pennsylvania: George W. Jacobs & Company, 1906.
- Current, Richard N., et al. eds. Encyclopedia of the Confederacy (1993) (4 Volume set; also 1 vol abridged version) (ISBN 0-13-275991-8)
- Dowd, Clement. Life of Zebulon B. Vance. Charlotte, North Carolina: Observer Printing and Publishing Co., 1897.
- Elliott, Sam Davis. Isham G. Harris of Tennessee: Confederate Governor and United States Senator. Baton Rouge, Louisiana: Louisiana State University Press, 2010.
- Evans, Eli N. Judah P. Benjamin: The Jewish Confederate. New York: The Free Press, 1988. ISBN 0-02-908880-1.
- King, Alvy L. Louis T. Wigfall: Southern Fire–eater. Baton Rouge, Louisiana: Louisiana State University Press, 1970.
- Meade, Robert Douthat. Judah P. Benjamin: Confederate Statesman. New York: Oxford University Press, 1943.
- Mobley, Joe A. War Governor of the South: North Carolina's Zeb Vance in the Confederacy. University Press of Florida, 2005.
- Philips, Christopher. Missouri's Confederate: Cleburne Fox Jackson and the Creation of Southern Identity in the Border West. Columbia, Missouri: University of Missouri Press, 2000.
- Poteat, R. Mattew. Henry Toole Clark: Civil War Governor of North Carolina. Jefferson, North Carolina: McFarland & Company, Inc., 2009. ISBN 978-0-7864-3728-3.
- Saunders, Jr., Robert. John Archibald Campbell, Southern Moderate, 1811–1889. Tuscaloosa, Alabama: University of Alabama Press, 1997.
- Simpson, Craig M. A Good Southerner: The Life of Henry A. Wise of Virginia. Chapel Hill, North Carolina: University of North Carolina Press, 1985.
- Tucker, Glenn. Zeb Vance: Champion of Personal Freedom. Indianapolis, Indiana: Bobbs–Merrill Company, 1965.
- Underwood, Rodman L. Stephen Russell Mallory: A Biography of the Confederate Navy Secretary and United States Senator. Jefferson, North Carolina: McFarland & Company, 2006.
- Wakelyn, Jon L. Biographical Dictionary of the Confederacy Greenwood Press ISBN 0-8371-6124-X
- Yearns, W. Buck, ed. The Confederate Governors. Athens, Georgia: University of Georgia Press, 1986.

==== Jefferson Davis ====
- Allen, Felicity. Jefferson Davis: Unconquerable Heart. Columbia, Missouri: University of Missouri Press, 1999. ISBN 0-8262-1219-0.
- Canfield, Cass. The Iron Will of Jefferson Davis. New York: Fairfax Press, 1978. ISBN 0-517-36244-9.
- Cooper, William J. Jefferson Davis, American. New York: Alfred A. Knopf, 2000. ISBN 0-394-56916-4.
- Davis, William C. Jefferson Davis: The Man and His Hour New York: HarperCollins Publishers, 1991. ISBN 0-06-016706-8.
- Hattaway, Herman and Richard E. Beringer. Jefferson Davis, Confederate President. Lawrence, Kansas: University Press of Kansas, 2002. ISBN 0-7006-1170-3
- Strode, Hudson. Jefferson Davis, three volumes. New York: Harcourt, Brace and Company, 1955–1964.
- Volume one: American Patriot 1808–1861. 1955.
- Volume two: Confederate President. 1959.
- Volume three: Tragic Hero: The Last Twenty–Five Years 1864–1889. 1964.

=== Confederate soldiers ===
- Bardolph, Richard. "Inconstant rebels: desertion of North Carolina troops in the Civil War." North Carolina Historical Review 41.2 (1964): 163-189. online
- Daniel, Larry J. Soldiering in the Army of Tennessee: A Portrait of Life in a Confederate Army (UNC Press Books, 2003) online
- Donald, David. "The Confederate as a Fighting Man." Journal of Southern History 25.2 (1959): 178-193. online
- Faust, Drew Gilpin. "Christian Soldiers: The Meaning of Revivalism in the Confederate Army." Journal of Southern History 53.1 (1987): 63-90. online
- Levin, Kevin M. Searching for Black Confederates: The civil War’s most persistent Myth (UNC Press Books, 2019). Debunks a false myth. online
- Logue, Larry M. "Who joined the Confederate army? Soldiers, civilians, and communities in Mississippi." Journal of Social History (1993): 611-623. online
- Marrs, Aaron W. "Desertion and loyalty in the South Carolina infantry, 1861-1865." Civil War History 50.1 (2004): 47-65. excerpt
- Power, J. Tracy. Lee's Miserables: Life in the Army of Northern Virginia from the Wilderness to Appomattox (UNC Press Books, 2002). online
