= Bibliography of the French Revolution =

The following bibliography includes sources concerning the French Revolution.

== Surveys and reference ==
- Andress, David, ed. The Oxford Handbook of the French Revolution (Oxford University Press, 2015). excerpt, 714 pp; 37 articles by experts
- Aulard, François-Alphonse. The French Revolution, a Political History, 1789–1804 (4 vol. 1910); famous classic; volume 1 1789–1792 online; Volume 2 1792–95 online
- Azurmendi, Joxe (1997). The democrats and the violent. Mirande's critique of the French Revolution. Philosophical viewpoint. (Original: Demokratak eta biolentoak, Donostia: Elkar ISBN 978-84-7917-744-7).
- Ballard, Richard. A New Dictionary of the French Revolution (2011) excerpt and text search
- Bosher, J.F. The French Revolution (1989) 365 pp
- Davies, Peter. The French Revolution: A Beginner's Guide (2009), 192 pp
- Gershoy, Leo. The French Revolution and Napoleon (1945) 585 pp
- Gershoy, Leo. The Era of the French Revolution, 1789–1799 (1957), brief summary with some primary sources
- Gottschalk, Louis R. The Era of the French Revolution (1929), cover 1780s to 1815
- Hanson, Paul R. The A to Z of the French Revolution (2013)
  - Hanson, Paul R. Historical dictionary of the French Revolution (2015) online
- Jaurès, Jean (1903). A Socialist History of the French Revolution (2015 ed.). Pluto Press. ISBN 978-0-7453-3500-1.; inspiration for Soboul and Lefebvre, one of the most important accounts of the Revolution in terms of shaping perspectives;
- Jones, Colin. The Longman Companion to the French Revolution (1989)
- Jones, Colin. The Great Nation: France from Louis XV to Napoleon (2002) excerpt and text search
- McPhee, Peter, ed. (2012). A Companion to the French Revolution. Wiley. ISBN 978-1-118-31641-2.
- Madelin, Louis. The French Revolution (1916); textbook by leading French scholar. online
- Paxton, John. Companion to the French Revolution (1987), 234 pp; hundreds of short entries.
- Popkin, Jeremy D. A Short History of the French Revolution (5th ed. 2009) 176 pp
- Popkin, Jeremy D (1990). "The Press and the French Revolution after Two Hundred Years". French Historical Studies. 16 (3): 664–683. doi:10.2307/286493. JSTOR 286493.
- Scott, Samuel F. and Barry Rothaus, eds. Historical Dictionary of the French Revolution, 1789–1799 (2 vol 1984), short essays by scholars vol. 1 online; vol 2 online
- Sutherland, D.M.G. France 1789–1815. Revolution and Counter-Revolution (2nd ed. 2003, 430 pp excerpts and online search from Amazon.com

== European and Atlantic history ==
- Amann, Peter H., ed. The eighteenth-century revolution: French or Western? (Heath, 1963) readings from historians
- Brinton, Crane. A Decade of Revolution 1789–1799 (1934) the Revolution in European context
- Desan, Suzanne, et al. eds. The French Revolution in Global Perspective (2013)
- Fremont-Barnes, Gregory. ed. The Encyclopedia of the French Revolutionary and Napoleonic Wars: A Political, Social, and Military History (ABC-CLIO: 3 vol 2006)
- Goodwin, A., ed. The New Cambridge Modern History, Vol. 8: The American and French Revolutions, 1763–93 (1965), 764 pp
- Palmer, R.R. "The World Revolution of the West: 1763–1801," Political Science Quarterly (1954) 69#1 pp. 1–14 JSTOR 2145054
- Palmer, Robert R. The Age of the Democratic Revolution: A Political History of Europe and America, 1760–1800. (2 vol 1959), highly influential comparative history; vol 1 online
- Rude, George F. and Harvey J. Kaye. Revolutionary Europe, 1783–1815 (2000), scholarly survey excerpt and text search

== Politics and wars ==
- Andress, David. The Terror: Civil war in the French revolution (2006).
- ed. Baker, Keith M. The French Revolution and the Creation of Modern Political Culture (Oxford, 1987–94) vol 1: The Political Culture of the Old Regime, ed. K.M. Baker (1987); vol. 2: The Political Culture of the French Revolution, ed. C. Lucas (1988); vol. 3: The Transformation of Political Culture, 1789–1848, eds. F. Furet & M. Ozouf (1989); vol. 4: The Terror, ed. K.M. Baker (1994). excerpt and text search vol 4
- Blanning, T.C.W. The French Revolutionary Wars 1787–1802 (1996).
- Desan, Suzanne. "Internationalizing the French Revolution," French Politics, Culture & Society (2011) 29#2 pp. 137–60.
- Doyle, William. Origins of the French Revolution (3rd ed. 1999) online edition
- Englund, Steven. Napoleon: A Political Life. (2004). 575 pp; emphasis on politics excerpt and text search
- Fremont-Barnes, Gregory. The French Revolutionary Wars (2013), 96 pp; excerpt and text search
- Griffith, Paddy. The Art of War of Revolutionary France 1789–1802, (1998); 304 pp; excerpt and text search
- Hardman, John. Louis XVI: The Silent King (2nd ed. 2016) 500 pp; much expanded new edition; now the standard scholarly biography; (1st ed. 1994) 224; older scholarly biography
- Schroeder, Paul. The Transformation of European Politics, 1763–1848. 1996; Thorough coverage of diplomatic history; hostile to Napoleon; online edition
- Wahnich, Sophie (2016). In Defence of the Terror: Liberty or Death in the French Revolution (Reprint ed.). Verso. ISBN 978-1-78478-202-3.

== Economy and society ==
- Anderson, James Maxwell. Daily life during the French Revolution (2007)
- Andress, David. French Society in Revolution, 1789–1799 (1999)
- Kennedy, Emmet. A Cultural History of the French Revolution (1989)
- McPhee, Peter. "The French Revolution, Peasants, and Capitalism," American Historical Review (1989) 94#5 pp. 1265–80 JSTOR 906350
- Tackett, Timothy, "The French Revolution and religion to 1794," and Suzanne Desan, "The French Revolution and religion, 1795–1815," in Stewart J. Brown and Timothy Tackett, eds. The Cambridge History of Christianity vol. 7 (Cambridge UP, 2006).

=== Women ===
- Dalton, Susan. "Gender and the Shifting Ground of Revolutionary Politics: The Case of Madame Roland." Canadian journal of history (2001) 36#2
- Godineau, Dominique. The Women of Paris and Their French Revolution (1998) 440 pp 1998
- Hufton, Olwen. "Women in Revolution 1789–1796" Past & Present (1971) No. 53 pp. 90–108 JSTOR 650282
- Kelly, Linda. Women of the French Revolution (1987) 192 pp. biographical portraits or prominent writers and activists
- Landes, Joan B. Women and the Public Sphere in the Age of the French Revolution (Cornell University Press, 1988) excerpt and text search
- Melzer, Sara E., and Leslie W. Rabine, eds. Rebel daughters: women and the French Revolution (Oxford University Press, 1992)
- Proctor, Candice E. (1990). Women, Equality, and the French Revolution. Greenwood Press. Archived from the original on July 6, 2017 – via Questia.
- Roessler, Shirley Elson (1998). Out of the Shadows: Women and Politics in the French Revolution, 1789–95. Peter Lang. Archived from the original on 2014-05-02 – via Questia.

== Historiography and memory ==
- Andress, David. "Interpreting the French Revolution," Teaching History (2013), Issue 150, pp. 28–29, very short summary
- Censer, Jack R. "Amalgamating the Social in the French Revolution." Journal of Social History 2003 37(1): 145–50. online
- Cox, Marvin R. The Place of the French Revolution in History (1997) 288 pp
- Desan, Suzanne. "What's after Political Culture? Recent French Revolutionary Historiography," French Historical Studies (2000) 23#1 pp. 163–96.
- Furet, François and Mona Ozouf, eds. A Critical Dictionary of the French Revolution (1989), 1120 pp; long essays by scholars; strong on history of ideas and historiography (esp pp. 881–1034 excerpt and text search
- Furet, François. Interpreting the French revolution (1981).
- Germani, Ian, and Robin Swayles. Symbols, myths and images of the French Revolution. University of Regina Publications. 1998. ISBN 978-0-88977-108-6
- Geyl, Pieter. Napoleon for and Against (1949), 477 pp; summarizes views of major historians on controversial issues
- Hanson, Paul R. Contesting the French Revolution (2009). 248 pp.
- Kafker, Frank A. and James M. Laux, eds. The French Revolution: Conflicting Interpretations (5th ed. 2002), articles by scholars
- Kaplan, Steven Laurence. Farewell, Revolution: The Historians' Feud, France, 1789/1989 (1996), focus on historians excerpt and text search
- Kaplan, Steven Laurence. Farewell, Revolution: Disputed Legacies, France, 1789/1989 (1995); focus on bitter debates re 200th anniversary excerpt and text search
- Kates, Gary, ed. The French Revolution: Recent Debates and New Controversies (2nd ed. 2005) excerpt and text search
- Landes, Joan B. 1991. “More than Words: The Printing Press and the French Revolution.” Eighteenth-Century Studies 25: 85–98.
- Lewis, Gwynne (1993). The French Revolution: Rethinking the Debate. New York: Routledge. Archived from the original on August 20, 2020 – via Questia.
- McPhee, Peter, ed. (2012). A Companion to the French Revolution. Wiley. ISBN 978-1-118-31641-2.; 540 pp; 30 essays by experts; emphasis on historiography and memory
- Reichardt, Rolf: The French Revolution as a European Media Event, European History Online, Mainz: Institute of European History, 2010, retrieved: 17 December 2012.
- Ross, Steven T., ed. The French Revolution: conflict or continuity? (1971) 131 pp; excerpt from historians table of contents

== Primary sources ==
- Anderson, F.M. (1904). The constitutions and other select documents illustrative of the history of France, 1789–1901. The H. W. Wilson company 1904., complete text online
- Burke, Edmund (1790). "Reflections on the Revolution in France". The Physics Teacher. 25 (2): 72. Bibcode:1987PhTea..25...72F. doi:10.1119/1.2342155.
- Dwyer, Philip G.; McPhee, Peter, eds. (2002). The French Revolution and Napoleon: A Sourcebook. London: Routledge. Archived from the original on August 20, 2020 – via Questia.
- Legg, L.G. Wickham, ed. Select Documents Illustrative of the History of the French Revolution (2 Volumes, 1905) 630 pp vol 1 online free; in French (not translated)
- Levy, Darline Gay, et al. eds. Women in Revolutionary Paris, 1789–1795 (1981) 244 pp excerpt and text search
- Mason, Laura, and Tracey Rizzo, eds. The French Revolution: A Document Collection (1998) 334 pp excerpt and text search
- Stewart, John Hall, ed. A Documentary Survey of the French Revolution (1951), 818 pp
- Thompson, J.M., ed. The French revolution: Documents, 1789–94 (1948), 287 pp
- This article incorporates text from the public domain History of the French Revolution from 1789 to 1814, by François Mignet (1824), as made available by Project Gutenberg.
