= Bibliography of the Lewis and Clark Expedition =

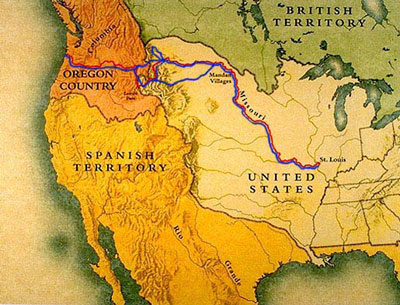
Map of expedition route

This is a bibliography of literature dealing with the Lewis and Clark Expedition.

The Lewis and Clark Expedition or Corps of Discovery Expedition (1804–1806) was the first transcontinental expedition to the Pacific Coast by the United States. Commissioned by President Thomas Jefferson and led by two Virginia-born veterans of Indian wars in the Ohio Valley, Meriwether Lewis and William Clark, the expedition had several goals. Their objectives were both scientific and commercial – to study the area's plants, animal life, and geography, and to discover how the region could be exploited economically. According to Jefferson himself, one goal was to find a "direct & practicable water communication across this continent, for commerce with Asia" (the Northwest Passage). Jefferson also placed special importance on declaring U.S. sovereignty over the Native Americans along the Missouri River, and getting an accurate sense of the resources in the recently completed Louisiana Purchase. c

== Books ==
- Allen, John Logan (1975). Passage Through the Garden: Lewis and Clark and the Image of the American Northwest. Urbana: University of Illinois Press. ISBN 978-0-252-00397-4.
- Ambrose, Stephen E.; Sam Abell (2002). Lewis and Clark: Voyage of Discovery. Roanoke, VA: National Geographic Society. ISBN 978-0-7922-6473-6.
- Ambrose, Stephen E. (1996). Undaunted Courage: Meriwether Lewis, Thomas Jefferson, and the Opening of the American West. New York: Simon & Schuster. ISBN 978-1-84739-763-8.
- Bergon, Frank, ed. (1989). The Journals of Lewis and Clark. New York: Penguin Books. ISBN 978-0-14-243736-0.
- Betts, Robert B. (2000). In Search of York: The Slave Who Went to the Pacific With Lewis and Clark. Boulder: University of Colorado Press. ISBN 978-0-87081-714-4.
- Billington, Ray Allen; James Blaine Hedges (1949). Westward Expansion: A History of the American Frontier. New York: The Macmillan Company.
- Botkin, Daniel B. (1995). Our Natural History: The Lessons of Lewis and Clark. Putnam. ISBN 978-0-19-516829-7.
- Burroughs, Raymond D. (1995). The Natural History of the Lewis and Clark Expedition. Michigan State University Press. ISBN 978-0-87013-389-3.
- Clarke, Charles G. (1970). The Men of the Lewis and Clark Expedition: A Biographical Roster of the Fifty-one Members and a Composite Diary of Their Activities from all the Known Sources. Glendale, California: A. H. Clark Co. ISBN 978-0-8032-6419-9.
- Coues, Elliott, ed. (1987). The History of the Lewis and Clark Expedition. New York: Dover ed., 1987; reprint of 1893 Francis P. Harper 4-vol. ed., 1893. ISBN 978-0-486-21268-5.
- Cutright, Paul R. (1989). Lewis and Clark: Pioneering Naturalists. University of Nebraska Press. ISBN 978-0-8032-6434-2.
- Cutright, Paul Russell (1976). A History of the Lewis and Clark Journals. Norman: University of Oklahoma Press. ISBN 978-0-8061-3247-1.
- Dattilio, Daniel (1986). Fort Clatsop: The Story Behind the Scenery. KC Publications. ISBN 978-0-88714-011-2.
- Daugherty, James (1951). Of Courage Undaunted. The Viking Press.
- DeVoto, Bernard, ed. (April 30, 1997). The Journals of Lewis and Clark (Revised ed.). Mariner Books. ISBN 978-0-395-85996-4.
- Devoto, Bernard Augustine (1998) [1952]. The Course of Empire. Boston: Houghton Mifflin Harcourt. ISBN 978-0-395-92498-3.
- Dillon, Richard (1965). Meriwether Lewis: A Biography. New York: Coward-McCann. ISBN 0-944220-16-9.
- Duncan, Dayton (1997). Lewis and Clark: An Illustrated History. New York: Knopf. ISBN 978-0-375-70652-3.
- Duncan, Dayton (1988). Out West: American Journey Along the Lewis and Clark Trail. Penguin Books. ISBN 978-0-14-008362-0.
- Fanselow, Julie (1994). The Traveler's Guide to the Lewis and Clark Trail. Helena, MT: Falcon Press. ISBN 978-1-56044-224-0.
- Fanselow, Julie (2003). Traveling the Lewis and Clark Trail. Guilford, Connecticut: Globe Pequot Press. ISBN 978-0-7627-2589-2.
- Fehrman, Craig. This Vast Enterprise: A New History of Lewis and Clark (Avid Reader Press. 2026). online at Google Books; also a review of this book
- Ferris, Robert G.; Roy E. Appleman, eds. (1975). Lewis and Clark: Historic Places Associated With Their Transcontinental Exploration (1804-06). Washington, D.C.: United States Department of the Interior, National Park Service. ISBN 978-0-931056-09-3.
- Fifer, Barbara; Vicky Soderberg (2002). Along the Trail with Lewis and Clark. Helena, Montana: Farcountry Press. ISBN 978-1-56037-188-5.
- Furtwangler, Albert (1993). Act of Discovery: Visions of America in the Lewis and Clark Journals. Urbana: University of Illinois Press. ISBN 0-252-06306-6.
- Gass, Patrick (1997). The Journals of Patrick Gass: Member of the Lewis and Clark Expedition. Mountain Press. ISBN 978-0-87842-351-4.
- Gass, Patrick (1958). A Journal of the Voyages and Travels of a Corps of Discovery Under the Command of Capt. Lewis and Capt. Clark. Minneapolis: Ross and Haines.
- Hawke, David Freeman (1980). Those Tremendous Mountains: The Story of the Lewis and Clark Expedition. Norton. ISBN 978-0-393-31774-9.
- Holt, Peter (1991). The Big Muddy: Adventures Up the Missouri. Hutchinson.
- Hunsaker, Joyce Badgley (2000). Sacagawea: Beyond the Shining Mountains With Lewis and Clark. Boise: Tamarack Books. ISBN 978-1-58592-079-2.
- Jackson, Donald, ed. (1962). Letters of the Lewis and Clark Expedition With Related Documents 1783–1854. Urbana: University of Illinois Press.
- Jones, Landon Y., ed. (2000). The Essential Lewis and Clark. New York: Ecco Press. ISBN 978-0-06-019600-4.
- Lavender, David (1990). The Way to the Western Sea: Lewis and Clark Across the Continent. New York: Anchor Books. ISBN 978-0-8032-8003-8.
- Mansfield, Leslie (2002). The Lewis & Clark Cookbook: Historic Recipes from the Corps of Discovery & Jefferson's America. Berkeley: Celestial Arts. ISBN 978-1-58761-147-6.
- Moulton, Gary E., ed. (1983–2001). The Journals of Lewis and Clark, Volumes 1–13. Lincoln, NE: University of Nebraska Press.
- Patent, Dorothy Hinshaw (March 15, 2002). Animals on the Trail with Lewis and Clark. Illustrated by William Muñoz. New York: Clarion Books. ISBN 978-0-395-91415-1.
- Patent, Dorothy Hinshaw (2003). Plants on the Trail with Lewis and Clark. New York: Clarion Books. ISBN 978-0-618-06776-3.
- Olmsted, Gerald (1986). Fielding's Lewis and Clark Trail. Fielding Travel Books.
- Rodger, Tod (2000). Bicycle Guide to the Lewis & Clark Trail. Harvard, MA: Deerfoot Publications. ISBN 0-9704027-0-8.
- Russell, Steve F. (2007). Lewis and Clark Across the Mountains: Mapping the Corps of Discovery in Idaho. Boise, ID: Idaho State Historical Society Press. ISBN 978-0-931406-16-4.
- Schmidt, Thomas (2002). National Geographic Guide to the Lewis & Clark Trail. Washington, D.C.: National Geographic. ISBN 978-0-7922-6471-2.
- Slaughter, Thomas P (2003). Exploring Lewis and Clark: Reflections on Men and Wilderness. New York: Alfred A. Knopf. ISBN 978-0-375-40078-0.
- Thomasma, Kenneth (1997). The Truth About Sacajawea. Grandview Pub. Co.
- Thwaites, Reuben Gold, ed. (2001). The Original Journals of the Lewis and Clark Expedition: Atlas. 1904. Reprint. Scituate, MA: Digital Scanning.
- Tubbs, Stephanie Ambrose; Clay Straus Jenkinson (2003). The Lewis and Clark Companion: An Encyclopedic Guide to the Voyage of Discovery. New York: Henry Holt.
- Wheeler, Olin D. (1904). The Trail of Lewis and Clark, 1804–1806. New York: G. P. Putnam's Sons.

=== Children's books ===
- Herbert, Janis (2003). Lewis and Clark for Kids: Their Journey of Discovery with 21 Activities. Chicago: Chicago Review Press.
- Patent, Dorothy Hinshaw (2002). The Lewis and Clark Trail: Then and Now. Illustrated by William Muñoz. Dutton Children's Books. ISBN 978-0-525-46912-4.

== Journal articles ==
- Abrams, Rochonne (July 1980). "Meriwether Lewis: The Logistical Imagination". Missouri Historical Society Bulletin. 36: 228–240.
- Bishop, Beverly D. (Fall 1981). "'The Writingest Explorers': Manuscripts of Lewis and Clark". Gateway Heritage. 2: 22–29.
- Bolas, Deborah W. (Fall 1981). "Books from an Expedition: A Publications History of the Lewis and Clark Journals". Gateway Heritage. 2: 30–35.
- Criswell, Elijah Harry (April 1940). "Lewis and Clark: Linguistic Pioneers". The University of Missouri Studies. 15.
- Hallock, Thomas (Fall 1997). "Literary Recipes from the Lewis and Clark Journals: The Epic Design and Wilderness Tastes of Early National Nature Writing". American Studies. 38: 43–66.
- Jackson, Donald (October 1967). "Some advice for the next editor of Lewis and Clark". Missouri Historical Society Bulletin. 24: 52–62.
- Large, Arlen J. (February 1991). "Expedition Aftermath: The Jawbone Journals". We Proceeded On. 16: 12–23.
- Moulton, Gary E. (March 1999). "The Journals of Lewis and Clark: Almost Home". Documentary Editing. 21: 9–14.
- Moulton, Gary E. (Summer 1985). "The Missing Journals of Meriwether Lewis". Montana: The Magazine of Western History. 35: 28–39.
- Sattelmeyer, Robert (1976). "The Lewis and Clark Journals and the Appropriation of the West". Lectures on Revolutionary America. Columbia: University of Missouri.
- Teggart, Frederick John (1908). "Notes Supplementary to any edition of Lewis and Clark". American Historical Association Annual Report. 1: 183–195.
- Thwaites, Reuben Gold (1903). "The Story of Lewis and Clark's Journals". American Historical Association Annual Report. 1: 105–129.

== See also ==
- List of bibliographies on American history
