= Bibliography of Wyoming history =

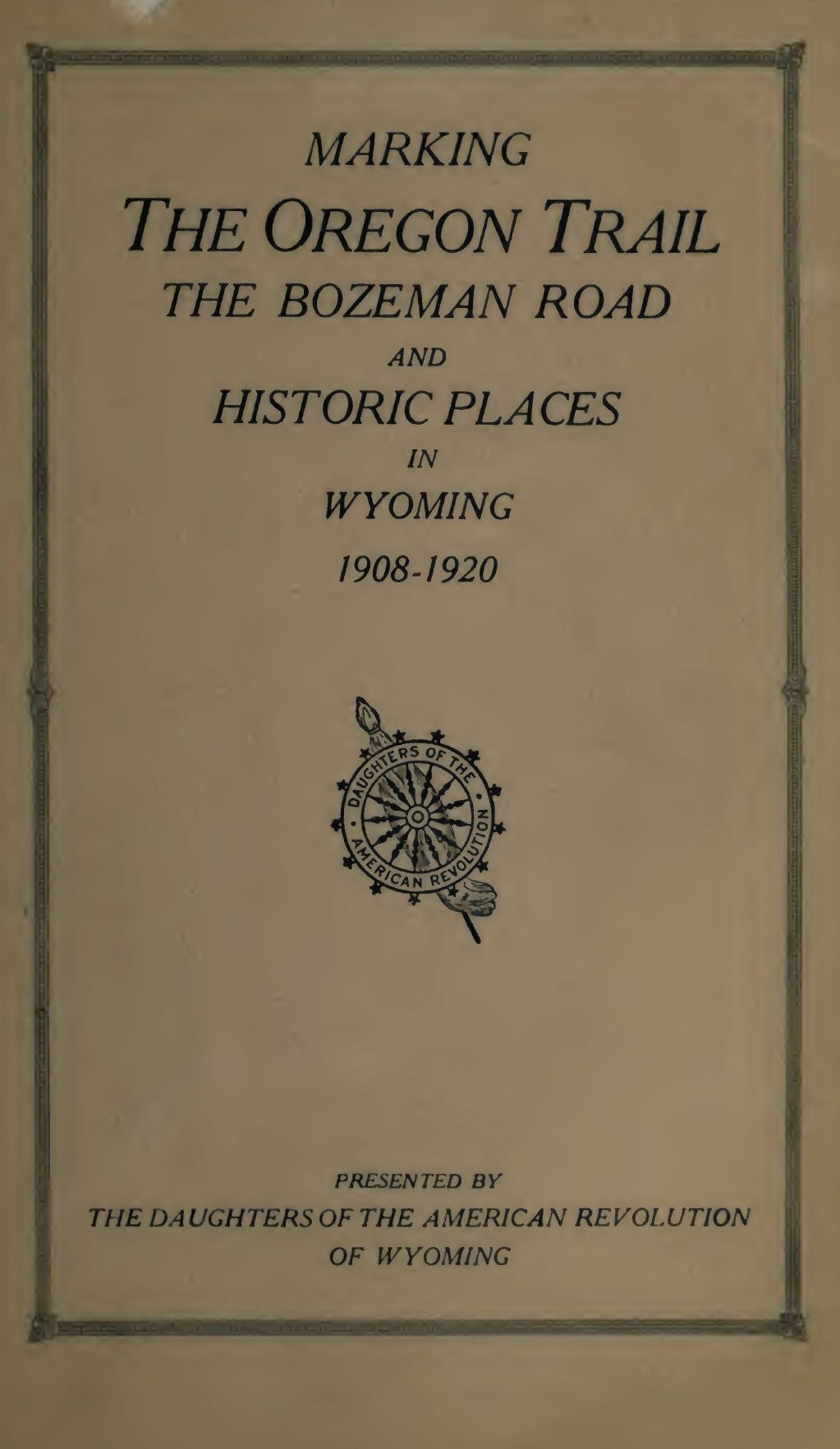
Marking the Oregon Trail...

The following works deal with the cultural, political, economic, military, biographical and geologic history of pre-territorial Wyoming, Wyoming Territory and the State of Wyoming.

== Surveys of Wyoming history ==
- Bartlett, Ichabod S., ed. (1918). History of Wyoming Volume 1 (PDF). Chicago: The S. J. Clarke Publishing company.
- Bartlett, Ichabod S., ed. (1918). History of Wyoming Volume 2 (PDF). Chicago: The S. J. Clarke Publishing company.
- Bancroft, Hubert Howe; Frances Fuller Victor (1890). History of Nevada, Colorado, and Wyoming, 1540-1888 (PDF). San Francisco: The History Company.
- Cassity, Michael. Lives Worth Living, History Worth Preserving Wyoming: A Brief History of Wyoming 1860 - 1960 (2010)
- Coutant, Charles Griffin (1899). The history of Wyoming from the earliest known discoveries (PDF). Laramie: Chaplin, Spafford & Mathison.
- Coutant, Charles Griffin (1899). History of Wyoming and (The Far West) (PDF). New York: Hudson Book Co.
- Hebard, Grace Raymond (1919). The history and government of Wyoming; the history, constitution and administration of affairs (PDF). San Francisco: C. F. Weber Co.
- Dick, Everett (1941). Vanguards of the Frontier: A Social History of the Northern Plains and Rocky Mountains from the Earliest White Contacts to the Coming of the Homemaker. Archived from the original on May 20, 2018 – via Questia.
- Hebard, Grace Raymond (1922). Teaching Wyoming history by counties (PDF). Wyoming State Dept. of Education.
- Swindler, William; Vexler, Robert State (1979). Wyoming: Chronology and Documentary Handbook. New York: Oceana Publications.
- Writers' Program of the Work Projects Administration in the State of Wyoming (1940). Wyoming, a Guide to Its History, Highways, and People. Archived from the original on March 8, 2016 – via Questia. Famous WPA guide.

== Historic expeditions ==
- Engelmann, George; Forwood, William Henry; Gray, Asa; Gregory, James F.; Sheridan, Philip Henry (1882). Report of an exploration of parts of Wyoming, Idaho, and Montana in August and September, 1882 /made by Lieut. Gen. P. H. Sheridan, commanding the Military division of the Missouri, with the itinerary of Col. Jas. F. Gregory, and a geological and botanical report by W. H. Forwood (PDF). Washington D.C.: U.S. Government Printing Office.
- Mattes, Merrill J. (1970). Colter's Hell & Jackson's Hole: The Fur Trapper's Exploration of the Yellowstone and Grand Teton Park Region. Gardiner, MT: Yellowstone Library and Museum Association and Grand Teton Natural History Association.

=== Cook, Folsom, Peterson Expedition (1869) ===
- Cook, Charles W.; Folsom, Dave E.; Peterson, William (1965). Haines, Aubrey L. (ed.). The Valley of the Upper Yellowstone-An Exploration of the Headwaters of the Yellowstone River in the Year 1869. Norman, OK: University of Oklahoma Press.

=== Washburn, Langford, Doane Expedition (1870) ===
- Langford, Nathaniel Pitt (1905). The Discovery of Yellowstone Park; Diary of the Washburn Expedition to the Yellowstone and Firehole Rivers in the Year 1870. St. Paul, MN: Frank Jay Haynes.

=== Hayden Geological Survey (1871) ===
- Hayden, F. V. (1880). The Great West: Its Attractions and Resources, Containing a Popular Description of the Marvelous Scenery, Physical Geography, Fossils and Glaciers of the Wonderful Region, And the Recent Explorations of the Yellowstone Park, "The Wonderland of America". Bloomington, IL: Charles R. Brodix.
- Merrill, Marlene Deahl, ed. (1999). Yellowstone and the Great West-Journals, Letters and Images from the 1871 Hayden Expedition. Lincoln, NE: University of Nebraska Press. ISBN 0-8032-3148-2.

== Business, economy and labor ==
- Cassity, Michael. Wyoming Will Be Your New Home: Ranching, Farming, and Homesteading in Wyoming, 1860–1960 (Cheyenne: Wyoming State Parks and Cultural Resources, 2011) 342 pp.
- Cassity, Michael. Building Up Wyoming: Depression-Era Federal Projects in Wyoming, 1929-1943 (Wyoming State Historic Preservation Office, 2013)
- Gardner, A. Dudley (1989). Forgotten Frontier: A History of Wyoming Coal Mining. Boulder, CO: Westview Press. ISBN 0-8133-1008-3.
- Murphy, Victoria (1999). Wyoming: a 20th century history of its citizens, businesses & institutions. Carlsbad, CA: Heritage Media Corp.
- Rollinson, John K. (1948). E. A. Brininstool (ed.). Wyoming Cattle Trails, History of the Migration of Oregon-Raised Herds to Mid-Western Markets. Caldwell, ID: Claxton Printer.

== Indians ==
- Dorsey, George Amos (1900). An aboriginal quartzite quarry in eastern Wyoming (PDF). Chicago: Field Columbian Museum.
- Hoebel, E. Adamson. The Cheyennes: Indians of the Great Plains (1978)
- Lowie, Robert H. The Crow Indians (U. of Nebraska Press, 1983)

=== Military histories ===
- Brady, Cyrus Townsend (1904). Indian Fights and Fighters-The Soldier and the Sioux (PDF). New York: McClure, Phillips and Co.
- Brown, Dee (1984). The Fetterman massacre. Lincoln, NE: University of Nebraska Press. ISBN 0-8032-5730-9.
- Carrington, Frances (1910). My Army Life and the Fort Phil. Kearney Massacre, With an Account of the Celebration of "Wyoming Opened," (PDF). Philadelphia: J. B. Lippincott.
- Fifer, Barbara. Montana Battlefields 1806-1877: Native Americans And the U.S. Army at War (2005) excerpt and text search
- Goodrich, Thomas. (1997). Scalp Dance: Indian Warfare on the High Plains, 1865-1879. Mechanicsburg, PA: Stackpole Books. ISBN 0-8117-1523-X.
- Gray, John S. (1993). Custer's Last Campaign: Mitch Boyer and the Little Bighorn Remembered. University of Nebraska Press. ISBN 0-8032-7040-2.
- Greene, Jerome A. (2000). Nez Perce Summer-The U.S. Army and the Nee-Me-Poo Crisis. Helena, MT: Montana Historical Society Press. ISBN 0-917298-68-3.
- Hampton, Bruce (1994). Children of Grace-The Nez Perce War of 1877. New York: Henry Holt and Company. ISBN 0-8050-1991-X.
- Keenan, Jerry (2000). The Wagon Box Fight: An Episode of Red Cloud's War. Savas Publishing. ISBN 1-882810-87-2.
- Lindmier, Tom (2002). Drybone: a history of Fort Fetterman, Wyoming. Glendo, WY: High Plains Press.
- McDermott, John Dishon (2003). Circle of Fire: The Indian War of 1865. Stackpole Books. ISBN 978-0-8117-0061-0.
- Ware, Eugene Fitch (1911). The Indian war of 1864 : being a fragment of the early history of Kansas, Nebraska, Colorado, and Wyoming (PDF). Topeka, KS: Crane & Co.
- West, Elliott (2009). The last Indian war : the Nez Perce story. Oxford: Oxford University Press. ISBN 978-0-19-513675-3.
- Bureau of Indian Affairs (1904). Encounter between Sioux Indians of the Pine Ridge agency (PDF). Washington D.C.: U.S. Government Printing Office.

=== Primary sources ===
- Miles, Nelson A. (1896). Personal Reflections and Observations of Nelson A. Miles. Chicago: The Werner Company.
- Moses, William Edgar (1910). Official roster, Department of Colorado and Wyoming, Grand army of the republic; embracing a digest of the history, organization and growth of the Grand army of the republic, Ladies of the Grand army, Woman's relief corps and Loyal legion (PDF). Denver: Grand Army of the Republic. Dept. of Colorado & Wyoming.

== Local and regional histories ==
- Hebard, Grace Raymond (1922). Marking the Oregon Trail, the Bozeman Road and historic places in Wyoming 1908-1920 (PDF). Cheyenne, WY: Daughters of the American Revolution of Wyoming.
- Hunton, John (1928). A short history of old Fort Laramie (the cradle of western empire) (His Early days in Wyoming). The Goshen News.
- Johnson, Dorothy M. (1971). The Bloody Bozeman-The Perilous Trail to Montana's Gold. New York: McGraw-Hill Book Company. ISBN 0-87842-152-1.
- Jones, Gladys Powelson (1983). Cheyenne, Cheyenne, Our Blue-Collar Heritage. Cheyenne, WY: Gladys Powelson Jones. ISBN 0-9612628-0-X.
- Mokler, Alfred James (1923). History of Natrona county, Wyoming, 1888-1922; true portrayal of the yesterdays of a new county and a typical frontier town of the middle West. Fortunes and misfortunes, tragedies and comedies, struggles and triumphs of the pioneers (PDF). Chicago: R.R. Donnelley & Sons Company.

=== Law and order ===
- Carlson, Chip (2001). Tom Horn, Blood on the Moon. Glendo, WY: High Plains Press. ISBN 0-931271-58-4.
- Gorzalka, Ann (1998). Wyoming's territorial sheriffs. Glendo, WY: High Plains Press.
- Krakel, Dean F. (1988). The Saga of Tom Horn: The Story of a Cattlemen's War. Lincoln, NE: University of Nebraska Press. ISBN 0-8032-7767-9.
- Langford, Nathaniel Pitt (1893). Vigilante Days and Ways-The Pioneers of the Rockies-the makers and making of Montana, Idaho, Oregon, Washington, and Wyoming (PDF). New York: D. D. Merrill.
- Smith, Helena Huntington (1967). The War on Powder River. Lincoln, NE: University of Nebraska Press.
- O'Neal, Bill (2004). The Johnson County War. Austin, TX: Eakin Press. ISBN 1-57168-876-5.
- Davis, John W. (2010). Wyoming Range War: The Infamous Invasion of Johnson County. Norman, OK: University of Oklahoma Press. ISBN 978-0-8061-4106-0.

=== Ghost towns ===
- Florin, Lambert (1971). Montana, Idaho and Wyoming: Ghost Towns. Seattle: Superior Publishing Company.
- Pence, Mary Lou; Lola M. Homsher (1956). The Ghost Towns of Wyoming. New York: Hastings House.
- Webb, Todd (1961). Gold Strikes and Ghost Towns. Garden City, NJ: Doubleday and Co.
- Weis, Norman D. (1972). Ghost Towns of the Northwest. Caldwell, ID: University of Nebraska Press for Caxton Press. ISBN 0-87004-201-7.

== Biographies ==
- Chamblin, Thomas S. ed. Historical encyclopedia of Wyoming (2 vol Wyoming Historical Institute, 1954); 952 biographies in 1040 pages.
- Mumey, Nolie (1972). The Life Of Jim Baker 1818-1898. New York: Interland Publishing.
- Scott, Kim Allen (2007). Yellowstone Denied-The Life of Gustavus Cheyney Doane. Norman, OK: University of Oklahoma Press. ISBN 978-0-8061-3800-8.
- Sandoz, Mari (1992). CRAZY HORSE; The Strange Man Of The Oglalas. A Biography by.Introduction By Stephen B. Oates. 50th Anniversary Edition. Lincoln, NE: University of Nebraska Press. ISBN 978-0-8032-9211-6.

=== Memoirs and primary sources ===
- Bonney, Orrin H.; Bonney, Lorraine (1970). Battle Drums and Geysers-The Life And Journals Of Lt. Gustavus Cheyney Doane, Soldier And Explorer Of The Yellowstone And Snake River Regions. Chicago: Swallow Press.
- Brooks, Bryant B. (1939). Memoirs of Bryant B. Brooks: Cowboy, Trapper, Lumberman, Stockman, Oilman, Banker, and Governor of Wyoming. Glendale, CA: Arthur H. Clark Co.
- Crawford, Lewis F. (1926). Rekindling Camp Fires-The Exploits of Ben Arnold (Connor)-An authentic narrative of sixty years in the old West as an Indian Fighter, Gold Miner, Cowboy, Hunter, and Army Scout. Bismarck, ND: Capital Book Co.
- Quaife, M.M., ed. (1926). Yellowstone Kelly-The Memoirs of Luther S. Kelly. New Haven, CT: Yale University Press.
- Stewart, Elinore Pruitt (1914). Letters of a Woman Homesteader. Houghton Mifflin Co.
- Stewart, Elinore Pruitt (1915). Letters on an Elk Hunt. Houghton Mifflin Co.

== Political histories ==
- Journal and debates of the Constitutional Convention of the state of Wyoming : begun at the city of Cheyenne on September 2, 1889, and concluded September 30, 1889 (PDF). Cheyenne, WY: Daily Sun, Book and Job Printing. 1893.
- Gould, Lewis L. (1968). Wyoming: a political history, 1868-1896. New Haven, CT: Yale University Press.

== Culture ==
- Bonner, Robert E. (2007). William F. Cody's Wyoming Empire: The Buffalo Bill nobody knows. Norman, OK: University of Oklahoma Press. ISBN 978-0-8061-3829-9.

== Social history ==
- Fetter, Richard (1985). Mountain Men of Wyoming. Boulder, CO: Johnson Books. ISBN 0-933472-64-1.

== Geology ==
- Mueller, P. A.; Wooden, J. L.; Henry, D. J.; Mogk, D. W (1983). Development of the Earth's early crust: Implications from the Beartooth Mountains (PDF). NASA.

== Journals ==
- Annals of Wyoming: The Wyoming History Journal Wyoming State Historical Society in association with the Department of History, University of Wyoming. Published as the Quarterly Bulletin (1923–1925), Annals of Wyoming (1925–1993), Wyoming Annals (1993–1995) and Wyoming History Journal (1995–1996). Index

== Bibliographies ==
- Hebard, Grace Raymond (1936). History and romance of Wyoming : a guide to book titles and historic places / compiled by Grace Raymond Hebard for use in connection with the Map of the history and romance of Wyoming drawn by Paul M. Paine and Grace Raymond Hebard. Laramie, WY: Grace Raymond Hebard.
- Mullens, Marjorie (1977). Bibliography of the Geology of the Green River Formation, Colorado, Utah, and Wyoming, to March 1, 1977. USGS Circular 675.
- Orr, Harriet Knight (1946). Bibliography for the history of Wyoming: a selected list of references. Laramie, WY: University of Wyoming Libraries.
- Van Arsdale, William O., ed. (1988). Bibliographies on Wyoming topics. Laramie, WY: University of Wyoming Libraries.
- Publications Available from the Wyoming State Geological Survey- November 1997. Wyoming Geological Survey. 1997.
- American Imprints Inventory (No.18 Wyoming (1866-1890)). New York: Kraus Reprint Corporation. 1964.
- A selective list of books on Wyoming and the West in the Albany County Public Library, Laramie, Wyoming / prepared in commemoration of Wyoming's seventy-fifth anniversary. Laramie, WY: Albany County Public Library. 1965.

== See also ==
- History of Wyoming#Further reading
- Bibliography of Yellowstone National Park
- List of bibliographies on American history
