= Bibliography of encyclopedias: history =

This is a list of encyclopedias and encyclopedic/biographical dictionaries published on the subject of history and historians in any language. Entries are in the English language except where noted.

== General history ==
- American Association for State and Local History. Directory of historical organizations in the United States and Canada. AASLH Press, 1990–. ISSN 1045-456X.
- Bagnall, Roger S.; Brodersen, Kai; Champion, Craige B.; Erskine, Andrew, Huebner, Sabine R. (2012): The Encyclopedia of Ancient History, Wiley, 13 vols, 7,800 pages. ISBN 9781405179355. Subscription-based online access available.
- Behnen, Michael, ed. (2002): Lexikon der deutschen Geschichte 1945–1990. Ereignisse – Institutionen – Personen im geteilten Deutschland. Kröner, Stuttgart 2002, ISBN 9783520834010. (in German)
- Burnett, Thom. Conspiracy Encyclopedia: The Encyclopedia of Conspiracy Theories
- Carruth, Gordon. Encyclopedia of World Facts and Dates. HarperCollins, 1993.
- DeFronzo, James V. Revolutionary movements in world history: From 1750 to the present. ABC-CLIO, 2006. ISBN 1851097937.
- dtv (2002): Lexikon des Mittelalters, Deutscher Taschenbuch Verlag, 9 vols, paperback, 9,900 pages. ISBN 978-3423590570. Online edition (2009) available from Brepolis, ISBN 978-2-503-52415-3. (in German)
- Evans, Barbara Jean. A to zax: a comprehensive dictionary for genealogists & historians. Hearthside Press, 1995. ISBN 0945231024.
- Feather, John. Dictionary of Book History. Oxford University Press, 1987.
- Fondation DHS, ed. (2011) Dictionnaire Historique de la Suisse (Historical Dictionary of Switzerland), Editions Gilles Attinger, Hauterive, ISBN 2-88256-133-4. (in French) Also published in German as Historisches Lexikon der Schweiz, Schwabe AG, Basel, ISBN 3-7965-1900-8 (in German) and Italian as Dizionario storico della Svizzera, Armando Dadò editore, Locarno, ISBN 88-8281-100-X. (in Italian). The work currently consists of 10 volumes (A-Sa) in each language and is expected to be completed in 2014 with the 13th volume. Free searchable online access is available.
- Geiss, Dieter, contrib. (2008): Der Grosse Ploetz, 35th edition, Verlag Vandenhoeck & Ruprecht, 2,128 pages. ISBN 978-3-525-32008-2.
- Haydn, Joseph, Benjamin Vincent. Haydn's dictionary of dates and universal information relating to all ages and nations. Scholarly Press, 1968.
- International Committee of Historical Sciences. International bibliography of historical sciences: Internationale Bibliographie der Geschichtswissenschaften. Librairie Armand Colin. ISSN 0074-2015.
- Johnson, David E. From day to day: A calendar of notable birthdays and events. Scarecrow Press, 2001. ISBN 081083944X.
- Kirby, D.P. (3 June 1997). A Biographical Dictionary of Dark Age Britain. Psychology Press. ISBN 978-1-85264-047-7.
- Kohn, George Childs, Leonard Latkovski, Jr. Dictionary of historic documents. Facts on File, 2003. ISBN 0816047723.
- Kuhlman, Erika A. A to Z of women in world history. Facts on File, 2002. ISBN 0816043345.
- Langer, William L. An Encyclopedia of World History: Ancient, Medieval, and Modern, Chronologically Arranged. 5th ed., Houghton Mifflin, 1972.
- Lenman, Bruce, Hilary Marsden. Chambers dictionary of world history. Chambers, 2005. ISBN 0550100946.
- MacCusker, John J. History of world trade since 1450. Macmillan Reference USA, 2006. ISBN 9780028658407.
- Peregrine, Peter N., Melvin Ember, Human Relations Area Files, Inc. Encyclopedia of prehistory. Kluwer Academic/Plenum, 2001–2002. ISBN 0306462648.
- Ritter, Harry. Dictionary of concepts in history. Greenwood Press, 1986. ISBN 0313227004.
- Shillington, Kevin (2004). Encyclopedia of African History. Routledge. 3 vols. 1,912 pages. ISBN 978-1-57958-245-6.
- Stearns, Peter N. (2001): The Encyclopedia of World History, 6th edition, Houghton Mifflin Harcourt, 1,243 pages. With searchable CD. ISBN 9780395652374.
- Strayer, Joseph, ed. (1989). Dictionary of the Middle Ages. Charles Scribner's Sons. ISBN 0-684-19073-7. Jordan, William Chester, ed. (2003). Dictionary of the Middle Ages: Supplement 1. Charles Scribner's Sons. ISBN 0-684-80642-8
- Taddey, Gerhard, ed. (1998): Lexikon der deutschen Geschichte. Ereignisse, Institutionen, Personen. Von den Anfängen bis zur Kapitulation 1945., 3rd edition, Kröner, Stuttgart, 1,410 pages. ISBN 3-520-81303-3.
- Wetterau, Bruce. Macmillan Concise Dictionary of World History. Macmillan, 1983.
- Williams, Henry Smith (1905), The Historians' History of the World, New York, The Outlook Company.

== Chronologies ==
- Asimov's Chronology of the World. HarperCollins, 1991.
- Grun, Bernard. Timetables of History. 3rd ed, Simon & Schuster, 1991.
- Murray, Tim. Milestones in archaeology: A chronological encyclopedia. ABC-CLIO, 2007. ISBN 9781576071861.
- New York Public Library Book of Chronologies. Prentice Hall, 1990.
- Trager, James. The People's Chronology: A Year-by-Year Record of Human Events from Prehistory to the Present. Rev. ed., Holt, 1992.

== Exploration and discovery ==
- Bohlander, Richard. World Explorers and Discoverers. Macmillan, 1992.
- Delpar, Helen. The Discoverers: An Encyclopedia of Explorers and Exploration. McGraw-Hill, 1980.
- Holland, Clive. Arctic exploration and development, c. 500 B.C. to 1915: An encyclopedia. Garland Publ., 1994. ISBN 0824076486.
- The Marshall Cavendish Illustrated Encyclopedia of Discovery and Exploration. Marshall Cavendish, 1991.

== Historians ==
- Boyd, Kelly. Encyclopedia of historians and historical writing. Fitzroy Dearborn, 1999. ISBN 1884964338.
- Cannon, John Ashton. The Blackwell dictionary of historians. Blackwell Reference, 1988. ISBN 063114708X.
- Jenkins, Ellen J. Eighteenth-Century British Historians. Thomson Gale, 2007. ISBN 9780787681548.
- Wilson, Clyde Norman. American historians, 1607–1865. Gale Research, 1984. ISBN 0810317087.

== Historiography ==
- Boia, Lucian, Ellen Nore, Keith Hitchins International Committee of Historical Sciences. Great historians from antiquity to 1800: An international dictionary. Greenwood Press, 1989. ISBN 0313245177.
- Woolf, D. R., Kathryn M. Brammall, Greg Bak. A global encyclopedia of historical writing. Garland, 1998. ISBN 0815315147.

== History by era ==
=== Ancient history ===
- Bhattacharyya, Narendra Nath. The Geographical dictionary: Ancient and early medieval India. Munshiram Manoharlal Publishers, 1991. ISBN 8121500788.
- Leroi-Gourham, André, José Garanger, Dominique Baffier. Dictionnaire de la préhistoire. Presses universitaires de France, 1988. ISBN 2130414591. (French)
- Salisbury, Joyce E., Mary Lefkowitz. Encyclopedia of women in the ancient world. ABC-CLIO, 2001. ISBN 1576070921.

=== Classical era ===
- Avi-Yonah, Michael, Israel Shatzman, F. W. Walbank.Illustrated encyclopaedia of the classical world. Sampson Low, 1976. ISBN 0562000372.
- Cancik, Hubert, Helmuth Schneider, Christine F. Salazar, David E. Orton. Brill's New Pauly: Encyclopaedia of the ancient world. Brill, 2002–. ISBN 9004122591.
- Daremberg, Charles Victor. Dictionnaire des antiquités grecques et romaines, d'après les textes et les monuments. Hachette, 1877–1919. (French).
- De Grummond, Nancy Thomson. An encyclopedia of the history of classical archaeology. Greenwood Press, 1996. ISBN 0313220662.
- Grant, Michael, Rachel Kitzinger. Civilization of the ancient Mediterranean: Greece and Rome. Scribner's, 1988. ISBN 0684175940.
- Hazel, John. Who's who in the Greek world. Routledge, 2000. ISBN 0415124972.
- Hazel, John. Who's who in the Roman world. Routledge. ISBN 0415224101.
- Hornblower, Simon, Antony Spawforth. The Oxford classical dictionary. Oxford University Press, 2003. ISBN 0198606419.
- Hornblower, Simon, Antony Spawforth. The Oxford companion to classical civilization. Oxford University Press, 1998. ISBN 0198601654.
- Pauly, August Friedrich von. Paulys real-encyclopadie der classischen Altertumswissenschaft. Supplement: Neue Bearbeitung unter Mitwirkung zahlreicher Fachgenossen. J. B. Metzler, 1903–1978.
- Paulys real-encyclopadie der classischen Altertumswissenschaft: neue Bearbeitung unter Mitwirkung zahlreicher Fachgenossen. J.B. Metzler, 1894–1972. (German)
- Salisbury, Joyce E., Mary Lefkowitz. Encyclopedia of women in the ancient world. ABC-CLIO, 2001. ISBN 1576070921.
- Shipley, Graham. The Cambridge dictionary of classical civilization. Cambridge University Press, 2006. ISBN 0521483131.
- Speake, Graham. Encyclopedia of Greece and the Hellenic tradition. Fitzroy Dearborn, 2000.

=== Middle Ages ===
- Bhattacharyya, Narendra Nath. The Geographical dictionary: Ancient and early medieval India. Munshiram Manoharlal Publishers, 1991. ISBN 8121500788.
- Broughton, Bradford B., Megan Broughton Blumbergs. Dictionary of medieval knighthood and chivalry. Greenwood Press, 1986. ISBN 0313245525.
- Chevalier, Ulysse. Répertoire des sources historiques du moyen âge. A. Picard, 1905–1907.
- Crabtree, Pam J. Medieval archaeology: An encyclopedia. Garland, 2001. ISBN 0815312865.
- Dahmus, Joseph. Dictionary of Medieval Civilization. Macmillan, 1984.
- Fritze, Ronald H., William B. Robison. Historical dictionary of late medieval England, 1272–1485. Greenwood Press, c2002. ISBN 0313291241.
- Gerli, E. Michael, Samuel G. Armistead. Medieval Iberia: An encyclopedia. Routledge, 2003. ISBN 0415939186.
- International encyclopaedia for the Middle Ages (IEMA): A supplement to LexMA-online. Brepols. Available online here.
- Jeep, John M. Medieval Germany: An encyclopedia. Garland, 2001. ISBN 0824076443.
- Johnson, Ruth A. All things medieval: an encyclopedia of the medieval world. Greenwood, 2011. ISBN 9780313364624.
- Jordan, William C. Dictionary of the Middle Ages. Charles Scribner's Sons, 2004–. ISBN 0684806428.
- Kazhdan, Alexander B. The Oxford Dictionary of Byzantium. Oxford University Press, 1991. ISBN 014051323X.
- Khan, Iqtidar Alam. Historical dictionary of medieval India. Scarecrow Press, 2008. ISBN 978-0-8108-5503-8.
- Langer, Lawrence N. Historical dictionary of medieval Russia. Scarecrow Press, 2002. ISBN 0810840804.
- Lexikon des Mittelalters online (LexMA). Brepols. Available online here. (German).
- Loyn, H. R. Middle Ages: A Concise Encyclopedia. Thames & Hudson, 1989.
- Meri, Josef W., Jere L. Bacharach. Medieval Islamic civilization: An encyclopedia. Routledge, 2006. ISBN 0415966914.
- Meyer, Otto, Renate Klauser. Clavis mediaevalis: Kleines Wörterbuch der Mittelalterforschung. O. Harrassowitz, 1962. (German).
- Murray, Alan V. The Crusades: An encyclopedia. ABC-CLIO, 2006. ISBN 1576078620.
- Nicol, Donald MacGillivray. A biographical dictionary of the Byzantine Empire. Seaby, 1991. ISBN 1852640480.
- ORB: The online reference book for medieval studies. Kathryn Talarico College of Staten Island, City University of New York. Available online here.
- Pulsiano, Phillip, Kirsten Wolf, Paul Acker. Medieval Scandinavia: An encyclopedia. Garland, 1993. ISBN 0824047877.
- Rosser, John H. Historical dictionary of Byzantium. Scarecrow Press, 2001. ISBN 0810839792.
- Roth, Norman. Medieval Jewish civilization: An encyclopedia. Routledge, 2003. ISBN 0415937124.
- Slack, Corliss Konwiser. Historical dictionary of the crusades. Scarecrow Press, 2003. ISBN 0810848554.
- Snodgrass, Mary Ellen, Linda Campbell Franklin. Who's who in the Middle Ages. McFarland, 2001. ISBN 0786407743.
- Strayer, Joseph R. Dictionary of the Middle Ages. Scribner's, 1982–1989.
- Vauchez, André, R. B. Dobson, Michael Lapidge. Encyclopedia of the Middle Ages. Editions du Cerf; Fitzroy Dearborn; Città nuova, 2000. ISBN 1579582826.
- Xiong, Victor Cunrui. Historical dictionary of medieval China. Scarecrow Press, 2009. ISBN 9780810860537.

=== Renaissance ===
- Bergin, Thomas G. and Jennifer Speake. Encyclopedia of the Renaissance. Facts on File, 1987.
- Bergin, Thomas Goddard, Jennifer Speake. Encyclopedia of the Renaissance and the Reformation. Facts on File, 2004. ISBN 0816054517.
- Bietenholz, Peter G., Thomas B. Deutscher. Contemporaries of Erasmus: a biographical register of the Renaissance and Reformation. University of Toronto Press, 1985–1987. ISBN 0802025072.
- Campbell, Gordon. The Oxford dictionary of the Renaissance. Oxford University Press, 2003. ISBN 0198601751.
- Grendler, Paul F., Renaissance Society of America. Encyclopedia of the Renaissance. Scribner's in association with the Renaissance Society of America, 1999. ISBN 0684805146.
- Nauert, Charles Garfield. Historical dictionary of the Renaissance. Scarecrow Press, 2004. ISBN 0810848678.
- Robin, Diana Maury, Anne R. Larsen, Carole Levin. Encyclopedia of women in the Renaissance: Italy, France, and England. ABC-CLIO, 2007. ISBN 1851097724.

=== Reformation ===
- Bergin, Thomas Goddard, Jennifer Speake. Encyclopedia of the Renaissance and the Reformation. Facts on File, 2004. ISBN 0816054517.
- Bietenholz, Peter G., Thomas B. Deutscher. Contemporaries of Erasmus: a biographical register of the Renaissance and Reformation. University of Toronto Press, 1985–1987. ISBN 0802025072.

=== 20th Century ===
- Brownstone, David and Irene Franck. Dictionary of 20th Century History. Prentice Hall, 1990.
- Burnett, Thom. Conspiracy Encyclopedia: The Encyclopedia of Conspiracy Theories
- Drexel, John. The Facts on File Encyclopedia of the 20th Century. Facts on File, 1991.
- Palmowski, Jan. A dictionary of contemporary world history: From 1900 to the present day. Oxford University Press, 2003. ISBN 019860484X.
- Pons, Silvio, Robert Service, Mark Epstein, Charles Townsend. A dictionary of 20th-century communism. Princeton University Press, 2010. ISBN 9780691135854.
- Sader, Emir. Latinoamericana: Enciclopedia contemporanea da America Latina e do Caribe. Laboratorio de Politicas Publicas; Boitempo Editorial, [2006?]. ISBN 8575590847.
- Teed, Peter. Dictionary of Twentieth-Century History. Oxford University Press, 1992.
- Tucker, Spencer. Encyclopedia of the Cold War: A political, social, and military history. ABC-CLIO, 2007. ISBN 978-1-85109-701-2.
- Yust, Walter. 10 eventful years: A record of events of the years preceding, including and following World War II, 1937 through 1946. Encyclopædia Britannica, [1947].
- Zeleza, Tiyambe, Dickson Eyoh. Encyclopedia of twentieth-century African history. Routledge, 2003. ISBN 0415234794.

==== Holocaust ====
- Epstein, Eric Joseph, Philip Rosen, Henry R. Huttenbach. Dictionary of the Holocaust: Biography, geography, and terminology. Greenwood Press, 1997. ISBN 031330355X.
- Fischel, Jack. Historical dictionary of the Holocaust. Scarecrow Press, 1999. ISBN 0810836114.
- Laqueur, Walter, Judith Tydor Baumel. The Holocaust encyclopedia. Yale University Press, 2001. ISBN 0300084323.
- Niewyk, Donald L., Francis R. Nicosia. The Columbia guide to the Holocaust. Columbia University Press, 2000. ISBN 0231112009.
- Spector, Shmuel, Robert Rozett. Encyclopedia of the Holocaust. Facts on File, 2000. ISBN 0816043337.
- Spector, Shmuel, Geoffrey Wigoder. The encyclopedia of Jewish life before and during the Holocaust. Yad Vashem; New York University Press, 2001. ISBN 0814793568.

== History of mathematics ==
- Grrattan-Guinness, Ivor. Companion Encyclopedia of the History and Philosophy of the Mathematical Sciences. Routledge, 1993.

== History of medicine ==
- Bynum, W. F. and Roy Porter. Companion Encyclopedia of the History of Medicine. Routledge, 1994.
- Kohn, George C. Encyclopedia of plague and pestilence: From ancient times to the present. Facts On File, 2007. ISBN 9780816069354; ISBN 0816069352.
- McGrew, Roderick E. and Margaret P. McGrew. Encyclopedia of Medical History. McGraw-Hill, 1985.

== History of psychology ==
- Howells, John G. & M. Livia Osborn. A Reference Companion to the History of Abnormal Psychology. Greenwood, 1984.

== History of science ==
- Asimov, Isaac. Asimov's Chronology of Science and Discovery. HarperCollins, 1989.
- Bynum, William F. Dictionary of the History of Science. Princeton University Press, 1981.
- Gascoigne, Robert Mortimer. Chronology of the History of Science, 1450-1900. Garland, 1987.
- Hellemans, Alexander and Bryan Bunch. Timetables of Science: A Chronology of the Most Important People and Events in the History of Science. Simon & Schuster, 1988.
- History of Science and Technology: A Narrative Chronology. Facts on File, 1988.
- McNeil, Ian. An Encyclopedia of the History of Technology. Routledge, 1990.
- Mount, Ellis and Barbara List. Milestones in Science and Technology: The Ready Reference Guide to Discoveries, Inventions, and Facts. 2nd ed., Oryx, 1993.
- Murray, Tim. Milestones in archaeology: A chronological encyclopedia. ABC-CLIO, 2007. ISBN 9781576071861.
- Parkinson, Claire. Breakthroughs: A Chronology of Great Achievements in Science and Mathematics, 1200-1930. G.K. Hall, 1985.

== Jewish history ==
- Epstein, Eric Joseph, Philip Rosen, Henry R. Huttenbach. Dictionary of the Holocaust: Biography, geography, and terminology. Greenwood Press, 1997. ISBN 031330355X.
- Gribetz, Judah. Timetables of Jewish History: A Chronology of the Most Important People and Events in Jewish History. Simon & Schuster, 1993.
- Kantor, Mattis. Jewish Time Line Encyclopedia. Jason Aronson, 1989.
- Medoff, Rafael, Chaim Isaac Waxman. Historical dictionary of Zionism. Scarecrow Press, 2000. ISBN 0810837730.
- Niewyk, Donald L., Francis R. Nicosia. The Columbia guide to the Holocaust. Columbia University Press, 2000. ISBN 0231112009.
- Roth, Norman. Medieval Jewish civilization: An encyclopedia. Routledge, 2003. ISBN 0415937124.
- Shamir, Ilana and Shlomo Shavit. Young Reader's Encyclopedia of Jewish History. Viking Kestral, 1987.
- Spector, Shmuel, Geoffrey Wigoder. The encyclopedia of Jewish life before and during the Holocaust. Yad Vashem; New York University Press, 2001. ISBN 0814793568.

== Military history ==
- Gaines, W. Craig (1 April 2008). Encyclopedia of Civil War Shipwrecks. LSU Press. ISBN 978-0-8071-4789-4.

== Regional history ==
- Canby, Courtlandt. Encyclopedia of Historic Places. Facts on File, 1984.
- Esposito, John L. The Oxford encyclopedia of the modern Islamic world. Oxford University Press, 1995. ISBN 0195066138.

=== Africa ===
- Appiah, Anthony, Henry Louis Gates. Africana: The encyclopedia of the African and African American experience. Oxford University Press, 2005. ISBN 0195170555.
- Arnold, Guy. Historical dictionary of civil wars in Africa. Scarecrow Press, 2008. ISBN 978-0-8108-5766-7.
- Collins, Robert O. Historical dictionary of pre-colonial Africa. Scarecrow Press, 2001. ISBN 0810839784.
- Diagram Group. Encyclopedia of African peoples. Facts on File, 2000. ISBN 0816040990.
- Falola, Toyin. Key events in African history: A reference guide. Greenwood Press, 2002. ISBN 0313313237.
- Lye, Keith, Diagram Group. Encyclopedia of African nations and civilizations. Facts on File, 2002. ISBN 0816045682.
- Middleton, John, Joseph Calder Miller. New encyclopedia of Africa. Thomson/Gale, 2008. ISBN 9780684314549.
- Page, Willie F., Facts on File. Encyclopedia of African history and culture. Facts on File, 2001. ISBN 0816044724.
- Shillington, Kevin. Encyclopedia of African history. Fitzroy Dearborn, 2005. ISBN 1579582451.
- The United States in Africa: A Historical Dictionary. Greenwood, 1989.
- Vogel, Joseh O., Jean Vogel. Encyclopedia of precolonial Africa: Archaeology, history, languages, cultures, and environments. AltaMira Press, 1997. ISBN 0761989021.
- Zeleza, Tiyambe, Dickson Eyoh. Encyclopedia of twentieth-century African history. Routledge, 2003. ISBN 0415234794.

==== African islands ====
===== Mauritius =====
- Gascoigne, Bamber. Encyclopedia of Britain. Macmillan, 1993. ISBN 0028971426.

===== Mayotte =====
- Sellier, Jean, Anne. Le Fur, Bertrand de Brun. Atlas historique des provinces et régions de France: Genèse d'un peuple. La Découverte, 1997. ISBN 2707127515.

===== Réunion =====
- Sellier, Jean, Anne. Le Fur, Bertrand de Brun. Atlas historique des provinces et régions de France: Genèse d'un peuple. La Découverte, 1997. ISBN 2707127515.

===== Seychelles =====
- Gascoigne, Bamber. Encyclopedia of Britain. Macmillan, 1993. ISBN 0028971426.

==== North Africa ====
- Clements, Frank. Historical dictionary of Arab and Islamic organizations. Scarecrow Press, 2001. ISBN 0810839776.
- Dumper, Michael, Bruce E. Stanley, Janet L. Abu-Lughod. Cities of the Middle East and North Africa: A historical encyclopedia. ABC-CLIO, 2007. ISBN 1576079198.
- International encyclopaedia for the Middle Ages (IEMA): A supplement to LexMA-online. Brepols. Available online here.
- Lexikon des Mittelalters online (LexMA). Brepols. Available online here. (German).
- Mattar, Philip. Encyclopedia of the modern Middle East and North Africa. Macmillan Reference USA, 2004. ISBN 0028657691.
- Mawṣililī, Ahmad. Historical dictionary of Islamic fundamentalist movements in the Arab world, Iran, and Turkey. Scarecrow Press, 1999. ISBN 0810836092.
- Somel, Selçuk Akşin. Historical dictionary of the Ottoman Empire. Scarecrow Press, 2003. ISBN 0810843323.
- Talhami, Ghada Hashem. Historical dictionary of women in the Middle East and North Africa. Scarecrow Press, 2013. ISBN 9780810868588.
- Who's who in the Arab world. Publitec Editions, 1966–. ISSN 0083-9752.

===== Algeria =====
- Naylor, Phillip Chiviges.Historical dictionary of Algeria. Scarecrow Press, 2006. ISBN 081085340X.

===== Egypt =====
- Coughlin, Kathryn M. Muslim cultures today: A reference guide. Greenwood Press, 2006. ISBN 0313323860.
- Goldschmidt, Arthur, Robert Johnston. Historical dictionary of Egypt. Scarecrow Press, 2003. ISBN 0810848562.
- Lobban, Richard. Historical dictionary of ancient and medieval Nubia. Scarecrow Press, 2004. ISBN 0810847841.

====== Ancient Egypt ======
- Bard, Kathryn A., Steven Blake Shubert. Encyclopedia of the archaeology of ancient Egypt. Routledge, 1999. ISBN 0415185890.
- Bierbrier, M. L. Historical dictionary of ancient Egypt. Scarecrow Press, 1999. ISBN 0810836149.
- Bunson, Margaret. The Encyclopedia of Ancient Egypt. Facts on File, 2012. ISBN 9780816082162.
- David, A. Rosalie, Antony E. David. A biographical dictionary of ancient Egypt. Seaby, 1992. ISBN 1852640324.
- Encyclopedia of Egyptology. University of California, Los Angeles. Available online here.
- Morkot, Robert. Historical dictionary of ancient Egyptian warfare. Scarecrow Press, 2003. ISBN 0810848627.
- Redford, Donald B. The Oxford encyclopedia of ancient Egypt. Oxford University Press, 2001. ISBN 0195102347.
- Wilkinson, Toby A. H. The Thames and Hudson dictionary of ancient Egypt. Thames and Hudson, 2005. ISBN 0500051372.

===== Libya =====
- St. John, Ronald Bruce. Historical dictionary of Libya. Scarecrow Press, 2006. ISBN 0810853035.

===== Morocco =====
- Park, Thomas Kerlin, Aomar Boum. Historical dictionary of Morocco. Scarecrow Press, 2006. ISBN 0810853418.

===== Sudan =====
- Coughlin, Kathryn M. Muslim cultures today: A reference guide. Greenwood Press, 2006. ISBN 0313323860.
- Lobban, Richard. Historical dictionary of ancient and medieval Nubia. Scarecrow Press, 2004. ISBN 0810847841.
- Lobban, Richard, Robert S. Kramer, Carolyn Fluehr-Lobban. Historical dictionary of the Sudan. Scarecrow Press, 2002. ISBN 0810841002.

===== Western Sahara =====
- Pazzanita, Anthony G. Historical dictionary of Western Sahara. Scarecrow Press, 2006. ISBN 0810855402.

==== Sub-Saharan Africa ====
- Mays, Terr M., Mark DeLancey. Historical dictionary of international organizations in sub-Saharan Africa. Scarecrow Press, 2002. ISBN 0810842572.
- Middleton, John. Encyclopedia of Africa south of the Sahara. C. Scribner's Sons, 1997. ISBN 0684804662.

===== Central Africa =====
====== Angola ======
- James, W. Martin, Susan H. Broadhead. Historical dictionary of Angola. Scarecrow Press, 2004. ISBN 0810849402.

====== Burundi ======
- Eggers, Ellen K. Historical dictionary of Burundi. Scarecrow Press, 2006. ISBN 0810853027.

====== Cameroon ======
- Gascoigne, Bamber. Encyclopedia of Britain. Macmillan, 1993. ISBN 0028971426.

====== Chad ======
- Decalo, Samuel. Historical dictionary of Chad. Scarecrow Press, 1997. ISBN 0810832534.

====== Equatorial Guinea ======
- Liniger-Goumaz, Max. Historical dictionary of Equatorial Guinea. Scarecrow Press, 2000. ISBN 0810833948.

====== Gabon ======
- Gardinier, David E., Douglas A. Yates. Historical dictionary of Gabon. Scarecrow Press, 2006. ISBN 0810849186.

====== Republic of the Congo ======
- Decalo, Samuel, Virginia McLean Thompson, Richard Adloff. Historical dictionary of Congo. Scarecrow Press, 1996. ISBN 0810831163.

====== Rwanda ======
- Gascoigne, Bamber. Encyclopedia of Britain. Macmillan, 1993. ISBN 0028971426.

===== East Africa =====
====== Burundi ======
- Eggers, Ellen K. Historical dictionary of Burundi. Scarecrow Press, 2006. ISBN 0810853027.

====== Kenya ======
- Gascoigne, Bamber. Encyclopedia of Britain. Macmillan, 1993. ISBN 0028971426.
- Maxon, Robert M., Thomas P. Ofcansky. Historical dictionary of Kenya. Scarecrow Press, 2000. ISBN 0810836165.

====== Madagascar ======
- Allen, Philip M., Marueen Covell. Historical dictionary of Madagascar. Scarecrow Press, 2005. ISBN 0810846365.

====== Malawi ======
- Gascoigne, Bamber. Encyclopedia of Britain. Macmillan, 1993. ISBN 0028971426.
- Kalinga, Owen J. M., C. A. Crosby. Historical dictionary of Malawi. Scarecrow Press, 2001. ISBN 0810834812.

====== Mozambique ======
- Azevedo, Mario Joaquim, Emmanuel U. Nnadozie, Tombe Nhamitambo Mbuia-João. Historical dictionary of Mozambique. Scarecrow Press, 2003. ISBN 0810837927.
- Gascoigne, Bamber. Encyclopedia of Britain. Macmillan, 1993. ISBN 0028971426.

====== Tanzania ======
- Gascoigne, Bamber. Encyclopedia of Britain. Macmillan, 1993. ISBN 0028971426.
- Ofcansky, Thomas P., Rodger Yeager, Laura S. Kurtz. Historical dictionary of Tanzania. Scarecrow Press, 1997. ISBN 0810832445.

====== Uganda ======
- Gascoigne, Bamber. Encyclopedia of Britain. Macmillan, 1993. ISBN 0028971426.

===== Horn of Africa =====
- Clements, Frank. Historical dictionary of Arab and Islamic organizations. Scarecrow Press, 2001. ISBN 0810839776.
- Mawṣililī, Ahmad. Historical dictionary of Islamic fundamentalist movements in the Arab world, Iran, and Turkey. Scarecrow Press, 1999. ISBN 0810836092.
- Somel, Selçuk Akşin. Historical dictionary of the Ottoman Empire. Scarecrow Press, 2003. ISBN 0810843323.

====== Djibouti ======
- Alwan, Daoud Aboubaker, Yohanis Mibrathu. Historical dictionary of Djibouti. Scarecrow Press, 2000. ISBN 0810838737.

====== Eritrea ======
- Killion, Tom. Historical dictionary of Eritrea. Scarecrow Press, 1998. ISBN 0810834375.

====== Ethiopia ======
- Coughlin, Kathryn M. Muslim cultures today: A reference guide. Greenwood Press, 2006. ISBN 0313323860.
- Shinn, David Hamilton, Thomas P. Ofcansky, Chris Prouty. Historical dictionary of Ethiopia. Scarecrow Press, 2004. ISBN 0810849100.

====== Somalia ======
- Mukhtar, Mohamed Haji, Margaret Castagno. Historical dictionary of Somalia. Scarecrow Press, 2003. ISBN 0810843447.

===== Southern Africa =====
====== Botswana ======
- Gascoigne, Bamber. Encyclopedia of Britain. Macmillan, 1993. ISBN 0028971426.
- Ramsay, Jeff, Barry Morton, Fred Morton. Historical dictionary of Botswana. Scarecrow Press, 1996. ISBN 0810831430.

====== Lesotho ======
- Gascoigne, Bamber. Encyclopedia of Britain. Macmillan, 1993. ISBN 0028971426.
- Rosenberg, Scott, Richard Frederick Weisfelder, Michelle Frisbie-Fulton. Historical dictionary of Lesotho. Scarecrow Press, 2004. ISBN 0810848716.

====== Madagascar ======
- Allen, Philip M., Marueen Covell. Historical dictionary of Madagascar. Scarecrow Press, 2005. ISBN 0810846365.

====== Namibia ======
- Gascoigne, Bamber. Encyclopedia of Britain. Macmillan, 1993. ISBN 0028971426.
- Grotpeter, John J. Historical dictionary of Namibia. Scarecrow Press, 1994. ISBN 081082728X.

====== South Africa ======
- Gascoigne, Bamber. Encyclopedia of Britain. Macmillan, 1993. ISBN 0028971426.
- Saunders, Christopher C., Nicholas Southey, Mary-Lynn Suttie. Historical dictionary of South Africa. Scarecrow Press, 2000. ISBN 0810836467.

====== Swaziland ======
- Booth, Alan R., John J. Grotpeter. Historical dictionary of Swaziland. Scarecrow Press, 2000. ISBN 0810837498.
- Gascoigne, Bamber. Encyclopedia of Britain. Macmillan, 1993. ISBN 0028971426.

====== Zambia ======
- Gascoigne, Bamber. Encyclopedia of Britain. Macmillan, 1993. ISBN 0028971426.
- Simon, David, James R. Pletcher, Brian V. Siegel. Historical dictionary of Zambia. Scarecrow Press, 2008. ISBN 978-0-8108-5305-8.

====== Zimbabwe ======
- Rubert, Steven C., R. Kent Rasmussen. Historical dictionary of Zimbabwe. Scarecrow Press, 2001. ISBN 0810834715.

===== West Africa =====
====== Benin ======
- Decalo, Samuel. Historical dictionary of Benin. Scarecrow Press, 1995. ISBN 0810829053.

====== Burkina Faso ======
- McFarland, Daniel Miles, Lawrence Rupley. Historical dictionary of Burkina Faso. Scarecrow Press, 1998. ISBN 0810834057.

====== Ghana ======
- Gascoigne, Bamber. Encyclopedia of Britain. Macmillan, 1993. ISBN 0028971426.
- Owusu-Ansah, David. Historical dictionary of Ghana. Scarecrow Press, 2005.

====== Guinea ======
- O'Toole, Thomas, Janice E. Baker. Historical dictionary of Guinea. Scarecrow Press, 2005. ISBN 0810846349.

====== Liberia ======
- Dunn, D. Elwood, Amos Jones Beyan, Carl Patrick Burrowes. Historical dictionary of Liberia. Scarecrow Press, 2001. ISBN 0810838761.

====== Mali ======
- Imperato, Pascal James, Gavin H. Imperato. Historical dictionary of Mali. Scarecrow Press, 2008. ISBN 9780810856035.

====== Mauritania ======
- Pazzanita, Anthony G., Alfred G. Gerteiny. Historical dictionary of Mauritania. Scarecrow Press, 1996. ISBN 0810830957.

====== Niger ======
- Decalo, Samuel. Historical dictionary of Niger. Scarecrow Press, 1997. ISBN 0810831368.

====== Nigeria ======
- Coughlin, Kathryn M. Muslim cultures today: A reference guide. Greenwood Press, 2006. ISBN 0313323860.
- Falola, Toyin, Ann Genova. Historical dictionary of Nigeria. Scarecrow Press, 2009. ISBN 9780810856158.
- Gascoigne, Bamber. Encyclopedia of Britain. Macmillan, 1993. ISBN 0028971426.

====== Sierra Leone ======
- Fyle, C. Magbaily, Cyril P. Foray. Historical dictionary of Sierra Leone. Scarecrow Press, 2006. ISBN 0810853396.
- Gascoigne, Bamber. Encyclopedia of Britain. Macmillan, 1993. ISBN 0028971426.

=== Americas ===
- Bedini, Silvio. The Christopher Columbus Encyclopedia. Simon & Schuster, 1992.
- Provost, Foster. Columbus Dictionary. Omnigraphics, 1991.
- Sabin, Joseph, Wilberforce Eames, R. W. G. Vail Bibliographical Society of America. A dictionary of books relating to America, from its discovery to the present time. Joseph Sabin, 1868–1936.

==== Caribbean ====
- Atkinson, Nadine C. The Caribbean history pocket encyclopedia. Arawak, 2003. ISBN 9768189002.
- Balderston, Daniel, Mike Gonzalez, Ana M. López. Encyclopedia of contemporary Latin American and Caribbean cultures. Routledge, 2000. ISBN 041513188X.
- Collier, Simon, Thomas E. Skidmore, Harold Blakemore. The Cambridge encyclopedia of Latin America and the Caribbean. Cambridge University Press, 1992. ISBN 0521413222.
- Désormeaux, Emile, & Jean Baptiste Du Tertre1. Antilles d'hier et d'aujourd'hui: Tout l'univers antillais du début de la colonisation à nos jours. Désormeaux, [1978–].
- Hallewell, Laurence. Historical dictionaries of Latin America. Scarecrow, 1967–. ISSN 1931-874X.
- Kinsbruner, Jay, Erick Detlef Langer. Encyclopedia of Latin American history and culture. Gale, 2008. ISBN 9780684312705.
- Sader, Emir. Latinoamericana: Enciclopedia contemporanea da America Latina e do Caribe. Laboratorio de Politicas Publicas; Boitempo Editorial, [2006?]. ISBN 8575590847.
- Saunders, Nicholas J. Peoples of the Caribbean: An encyclopedia of archeology and traditional culture. ABC-CLIO, 2005. ISBN 1576077012.
- Tenenbaum, Barbara A. Latin America, history and culture: An encyclopedia for students. Macmillan Library Reference, 1999. ISBN 0684805766.

===== Anguilla =====
- Carty, Brenda, Coleville L. Petty. Anguilla: Tranquil isle of the Caribbean. Macmillan Education, 2000.
- Gascoigne, Bamber. Encyclopedia of Britain. Macmillan, 1993. ISBN 0028971426.

===== Antigua and Barbuda =====
- Gascoigne, Bamber. Encyclopedia of Britain. Macmillan, 1993. ISBN 0028971426.

===== Bahamas =====
- Gascoigne, Bamber. Encyclopedia of Britain. Macmillan, 1993. ISBN 0028971426.

===== Barbados =====
- Fraser, Henry, John Gilmore, Sean Carrington. A–Z of Barbados heritage. Macmillan Caribbean, 2003. ISBN 0333920686; ISBN 9780333920688.
- Gascoigne, Bamber. Encyclopedia of Britain. Macmillan, 1993. ISBN 0028971426.

===== Cayman Islands =====
- Gascoigne, Bamber. Encyclopedia of Britain. Macmillan, 1993. ISBN 0028971426.

===== Cuba =====
- Enciclopedia y Clásicos Cubanos, inc. La enciclopedia de Cuba. Enciclopedia y Clásicos Cubanos, 1975–1977. ISBN 8435900975.
- Ezquerra, Jaime Alvar. Diccionario Espasa historia de España y América. Espasa, 2002. ISBN 8467003162.
- Martínez-Fernández, Luis. Encyclopedia of Cuba: People, history, culture. Greenwood Press, 2003. ISBN 157356334X.
- Suchlicki, Jaime. Historical dictionary of Cuba. Scarecrow Press, 2001. ISBN 081083779X.
- Tucker, Spencer D., James Arnold, Roberta Wiener, Paul G. Pierpaoli, Jack McCallum, Justin D. Murphy. The encyclopedia of the Spanish-American and Philippine-American wars: A political, social, and military history. ABC-CLIO, 2009. ISBN 9781851099511.

===== Dominica =====
- Gascoigne, Bamber. Encyclopedia of Britain. Macmillan, 1993. ISBN 0028971426.

===== Dominican Republic =====
- Enciclopedia dominicana. Enciclopédia Dominicana, 2000. ISBN 9768156341.
- Ramos, Alejandro Paulino, Aquiles Castro. Diccionario de cultura y folklore dominicano. ABC Editorial, 2005. ISBN 9993482382.

===== French Antilles =====
- Corzani, Jack. Dictionnaire encyclopedique Desormeaux. Editions Desormeuax, [1992–1993]. ISBN 2852750201.

===== Grenada =====
- Gascoigne, Bamber. Encyclopedia of Britain. Macmillan, 1993. ISBN 0028971426.

===== Guadeloupe =====
- Corzani, Jack. Dictionnaire encyclopedique Desormeaux. Editions Desormeuax, [1992–1993]. ISBN 2852750201.
- Sellier, Jean, Anne. Le Fur, Bertrand de Brun. Atlas historique des provinces et régions de France: Genèse d'un peuple. La Découverte, 1997. ISBN 2707127515.

===== Haiti =====
- Oriol, Michèle, Corinne Wieser. Histoire et dictionnaire de la révolution et de l'indépendance d'Haïti, 1789–1804. Fondation pour la Recherche Iconographique et Documentaire, 2002. ISBN 9993520829.

===== Jamaica =====
- Gascoigne, Bamber. Encyclopedia of Britain. Macmillan, 1993. ISBN 0028971426.
- Senior, Olive. Encyclopedia of Jamaican heritage. Twin Guinep, 2003. ISBN 9768007141.

===== Martinique =====
- Corzani, Jack. Dictionnaire encyclopedique Desormeaux. Editions Desormeuax, [1992–1993]. ISBN 2852750201.
- Sellier, Jean, Anne. Le Fur, Bertrand de Brun. Atlas historique des provinces et régions de France: Genèse d'un peuple. La Découverte, 1997. ISBN 2707127515.

===== Montserrat =====
- Gascoigne, Bamber. Encyclopedia of Britain. Macmillan, 1993. ISBN 0028971426.

===== Puerto Rico =====
- Fernandez, Ronald, Serafin Méndez Méndez, Gail Cueto. Puerto Rico past and present: An encyclopedia. Greenwood Press, 1998. ISBN 031329822X.
- Sugrañes, José A. Toro. Nueva enciclopedia de Puerto Rico. Editorial Lector, 1995. ISBN 8487624421.

===== Saba =====
- Hoetink, H. Encyclopedie van de Nederlandse Antillen. Elsevier, 1969.

===== Saint Barthélemy =====
- Sellier, Jean, Anne. Le Fur, Bertrand de Brun. Atlas historique des provinces et régions de France: Genèse d'un peuple. La Découverte, 1997. ISBN 2707127515.

===== Saint Kitts and Nevis =====
- Gascoigne, Bamber. Encyclopedia of Britain. Macmillan, 1993. ISBN 0028971426.

===== Saint Lucia =====
- Gascoigne, Bamber. Encyclopedia of Britain. Macmillan, 1993. ISBN 0028971426.

===== Saint Martin =====
- Sellier, Jean, Anne. Le Fur, Bertrand de Brun. Atlas historique des provinces et régions de France: Genèse d'un peuple. La Découverte, 1997. ISBN 2707127515.

===== Saint Vincent and the Grenadines =====
- Gascoigne, Bamber. Encyclopedia of Britain. Macmillan, 1993. ISBN 0028971426.

===== Sint Eustatius =====
- Hoetink, H. Encyclopedie van de Nederlandse Antillen. Elsevier, 1969.

===== Sint Maarten =====
- Hoetink, H. Encyclopedie van de Nederlandse Antillen. Elsevier, 1969.

===== Trinidad and Tobago =====
- Gascoigne, Bamber. Encyclopedia of Britain. Macmillan, 1993. ISBN 0028971426.

===== Turks and Caicos Islands =====
- Gascoigne, Bamber. Encyclopedia of Britain. Macmillan, 1993. ISBN 0028971426.

==== Central America ====
- Balderston, Daniel, Mike Gonzalez, Ana M. López. Encyclopedia of contemporary Latin American and Caribbean cultures. Routledge, 2000. ISBN 041513188X.
- Bunson, Margaret, Stephen Bunson. Encyclopedia of ancient Mesoamerica. Facts on File, 1996. ISBN 0816024022.
- Carrasco, David. The Oxford encyclopedia of Mesoamerican cultures: The civilizations of Mexico and Central America. Oxford University Press, 2001. ISBN 0195108159.
- Collier, Simon, Thomas E. Skidmore, Harold Blakemore. The Cambridge encyclopedia of Latin America and the Caribbean. Cambridge University Press, 1992. ISBN 0521413222.
- Evans, Susan Toby, David L. Webster. Archaeology of ancient Mexico and Central America: An encyclopedia. Garland, 2001. ISBN 0815308876.
- Hallewell, Laurence. Historical dictionaries of Latin America. Scarecrow, 1967–. ISSN 1931-874X.
- Kinsbruner, Jay, Erick Detlef Langer. Encyclopedia of Latin American history and culture. Gale, 2008. ISBN 9780684312705.
- Phillips, Charles, David M. Jones. The illustrated encyclopedia of Aztec and Maya: The history, legend, myth and culture of the ancient native peoples of Mexico and Central America. Lorenz, 2004. ISBN 0754814890.
- Sader, Emir. Latinoamericana: Enciclopedia contemporanea da America Latina e do Caribe. Laboratorio de Politicas Publicas; Boitempo Editorial, [2006?]. ISBN 8575590847.
- Smith, Joseph. Historical dictionary of United States–Latin American relations. Scarecrow Press, 2007. ISBN 0810855291.
- Tenenbaum, Barbara A. Latin America, history and culture: An encyclopedia for students. Macmillan Library Reference, 1999. ISBN 0684805766.

===== Belize =====
- Gascoigne, Bamber. Encyclopedia of Britain. Macmillan, 1993. ISBN 0028971426.

===== Costa Rica =====
- D'Angelo, G., Carlos Gispert. Enciclopedia de Costa Rica. Océano, 2001. ISBN 8449418798.
- Ezquerra, Jaime Alvar. Diccionario Espasa historia de España y América. Espasa, 2002. ISBN 8467003162.
- Gutierrez, Pedro Rafael. Calendario historico: 500 anos de historia de Costa Rica. Universidad Autonoma de Centro America, 1988. ISBN 9977630526.

===== Dominican Republic =====
- Ezquerra, Jaime Alvar. Diccionario Espasa historia de España y América. Espasa, 2002. ISBN 8467003162.

===== El Salvador =====
- Cardenal, Rodolfo. Enciclopedia de El Salvador. Océano, [2001]. ISBN 8449416183.
- Ezquerra, Jaime Alvar. Diccionario Espasa historia de España y América. Espasa, 2002. ISBN 8467003162.
- Peñate, Óscar Martínez and María Elena Sánchez. El Salvador, diccionario: Personajes, hechos históricos, geografía e instituciones. Editorial Nuevo Enfoque, 2000. ISBN 9992380047.

===== Guatemala =====
- Ezquerra, Jaime Alvar. Diccionario Espasa historia de España y América. Espasa, 2002. ISBN 8467003162.

===== Honduras =====
- d'Angelo, Graciela. Enciclopedia de Honduras. Océano Grupo Editorial, 2004. ISBN 8449419441.
- Ezquerra, Jaime Alvar. Diccionario Espasa historia de España y América. Espasa, 2002. ISBN 8467003162.
- Ortega, Ramiro Colindres, Oscar Armando Valladares. Enciclopedia histórica de Honduras. Graficentro Editores, 1989.
- O, Ramiro Colindres. Enciclopedia hondureña ilustrada: De personajes históricos y figuras contemporáneos. Graficentro Editores, 1994.

===== Nicaragua =====
- Ezquerra, Jaime Alvar. Diccionario Espasa historia de España y América. Espasa, 2002. ISBN 8467003162.
- Gispert, Carlos. Enciclopedia de Nicaragua. Oceano, 2003. ISBN 8449422310.

===== Panama =====
- Ezquerra, Jaime Alvar. Diccionario Espasa historia de España y América. Espasa, 2002. ISBN 8467003162.

==== North America ====
- Cooke, Jacob Ernest, W. J. Eccles, Mathé Allain. Encyclopedia of the North American colonies. Charles Scribner's Sons; Macmillan Canada; Macmillan International, 1993. ISBN 0684192691.
- Keller, Rosemary Skinner, Rosemary Radford Ruether, Marie Cantlon. Encyclopedia of women and religion in North America. Indiana University Press, 2006. ISBN 0253346851.
- Miller, Randall and John D. Smith. Dictionary of Afro-American Slavery. Greenwood, 1988.
- Zhou, Peter X. Collecting Asia: East Asian libraries in North America, 1868–2008. Association for Asian Studies, 2010. ISBN 9780924304569.

===== Bermuda =====
- Gascoigne, Bamber. Encyclopedia of Britain. Macmillan, 1993. ISBN 0028971426.

===== Canada =====
- Bercuson, David, J. L. Granatstein. Canadian military history. Oxford University Press, 1992. ISBN 0195408470.
- James Harley Marsh ed.: The Canadian Encyclopedia L'encyclopédie canadienne, Historica Canada, 2000. Online edition constantly updated and bilingual
- Ciment, James, Thaddeus Russell. The home front encyclopedia: United States, Britain, and Canada in World Wars I and II. ABC-CLIO, 2007. ISBN 978-1-57607-849-5.
- Encyclopedia of Saskatchewan. University of Regina.
- Gascoigne, Bamber. Encyclopedia of Britain. Macmillan, 1993. ISBN 0028971426.
- Gough, Barry M. Historical dictionary of Canada. Scarecrow Press, 1999. ISBN 081083541X.
- Hayes, Derek. Historical atlas of the Arctic. Douglas and McIntyre; University of Washington Press, 2003. ISBN 1553650042.
- Holland, Clive. Arctic exploration and development, c. 500 B.C. to 1915: An encyclopedia. Garland Publ., 1994. ISBN 0824076486.
- Lamar, Howard Roberts. The new encyclopedia of the American West. Yale University Press, 1998. ISBN 0300070888.
- Mills, William J. Exploring polar frontiers: A historical encyclopedia. ABC-CLIO, 2003. ISBN 1576074226.
- Myers, Jan. The Fitzhenry & Whiteside Book of Canadian Facts and Dates. Fitzhenry & Whiteside, 1986.
- New, W H: The Encyclopedia of Canadian Literature. University of Toronto, 2002
- Nuttall, Mark. Encyclopedia of the Arctic. Routledge, 2005. ISBN 1579584365.
- Story, Norah. Oxford Companion to Canadian History and Literature. Oxford University Press, 1967.

===== Greenland =====
- Hayes, Derek. Historical atlas of the Arctic. Douglas and McIntyre; University of Washington Press, 2003. ISBN 1553650042.
- Holland, Clive. Arctic exploration and development, c. 500 B.C. to 1915: An encyclopedia. Garland Publ., 1994. ISBN 0824076486.
- Mills, William J. Exploring polar frontiers: A historical encyclopedia. ABC-CLIO, 2003. ISBN 1576074226.
- Nuttall, Mark. Encyclopedia of the Arctic. Routledge, 2005. ISBN 1579584365.

===== Mexico =====
- Alvarez, José Rogelio. Enciclopedia de México. Enciclopedia de México, 1998. ISBN 1564090248.
- Arellanes, Anselmo. Diccionario histórico de la revolución en Oaxaca. [IIS] UABJO; IEEPO, 1997. ISBN 9687596058.
- Carrasco, David. The Oxford encyclopedia of Mesoamerican cultures: The civilizations of Mexico and Central America. Oxford University Press, 2001. ISBN 0195108159.
- Coerver, Don M., Suzanne B. Pasztor, Robert Buffington. Mexico: An encyclopedia of contemporary culture and history. ABC-CLIO, 2004. ISBN 1576071324.
- Collier, Simon, Thomas E. Skidmore, Harold Blakemore. The Cambridge encyclopedia of Latin America and the Caribbean. Cambridge University Press, 1992. ISBN 0521413222.
- Dent, David W. Encyclopedia of modern Mexico. Scarecrow Press, 2002. ISBN 0810842912.
- Evans, Susan Toby, David L. Webster. Archaeology of ancient Mexico and Central America: An encyclopedia. Garland, 2001. ISBN 0815308876.
- Ezquerra, Jaime Alvar. Diccionario Espasa historia de España y América. Espasa, 2002. ISBN 8467003162.
- Fernández, Roberto Peredo, Octavio Ochoa Contreras, Gialuanna Ayora Vázquez. Diccionario enciclopédico veracruzano. Universidad Veracruzana, 1993. ISBN 9688342939.
- Frazier, Donald S. The United States and Mexico at war: Nineteenth-century expansionism and conflict. Macmillan Reference USA, 1998. ISBN 0028646061.
- García, Carlos Román. Diccionario enciclopédico de Chiapas. Consejo Estatal para la Cultura y las Artes de Chiapas; Universidad de Ciencias y Artes del Estado de Chiapas, 2000. ISBN 9685025908.
- Guerrero Cultural Siglo XXI, A.C. Diccionario enciclopédico del Estado de Guerrero. Guerrero Cultural Siglo XXI, A.C, 1999.
- Hallewell, Laurence. Historical dictionaries of Latin America. Scarecrow, 1967–. ISSN 1931-874X.
- Higuera, Salvador Mateos. Enciclopedia gráfica del México antiguo. Secretaría de Hacienda y Crédito Público, 1992–[1994]. ISBN 9688065560.
- Instituto Nacional de Estudios Históricos de la Revolución Mexicana. Diccionario histórico y biográfico de la Revolución Mexicana. Instituto Nacional de Estudios Históricos de la Revolución Mexicana, Secretaría de Gobernación, 1990–1994. ISBN 968805562X.
- Kinsbruner, Jay, Erick Detlef Langer. Encyclopedia of Latin American history and culture. Gale, 2008. ISBN 9780684312705.
- Lamar, Howard Roberts. The new encyclopedia of the American West. Yale University Press, 1998. ISBN 0300070888.
- Musacchio, Humberto. Diccionario enciclopédico del Distrito Federal. Hoja Casa Editorial, 2000. ISBN 9686565582.
- Musacchio, Humberto. Milenios de México. Hoja Casa Editorial, 1999. ISBN 9686565345.
- Phillips, Charles, David M. Jones. The illustrated encyclopedia of Aztec and Maya: The history, legend, myth and culture of the ancient native peoples of Mexico and Central America. Lorenz, 2004. ISBN 0754814890.
- Pinzon, Soledad Mata, Carlos Zolla, Diego Méndez Granados Instituto Nacional Indigenista (Mexico). Diccionario enciclopédico de la medicina tradicional mexicana. Instituto Nacional Indigenista, 1994. ISBN 9682961335.
- Diccionario Porrúa de historia, biografía y geografía de México. Editorial Porrúa, 1995. ISBN 968452904X.
- Smith, Joseph. Historical dictionary of United States–Latin American relations. Scarecrow Press, 2007. ISBN 0810855291.
- Werner, Michael S., Tom Willcockson, Robert M. Salkin. Encyclopedia of Mexico: History, society and culture. Fitzroy Dearborn, 1997. ISBN 1884964311.

===== Saint Pierre and Miquelon =====
- Sellier, Jean, Anne. Le Fur, Bertrand de Brun. Atlas historique des provinces et régions de France: Genèse d'un peuple. La Découverte, 1997. ISBN 2707127515.

===== United States =====
- Abramson, Rudy, Jean Haskell, Jill Oxendine. Encyclopedia of Appalachia. University of Tennessee Press, 2006. ISBN 1572334568.
- Adams, James T. Dictionary of American History. Rev. ed., Scribner's, 1976.
- Atlas of American History. 2nd ed., Scribner's, 1984.
- Becker, William H. The Encyclopedia of American Business History and Biography. Facts on File/Bruccoli Clark Layman, 1988-.
- Benowitz, June Melby. Encyclopedia of American women and religion. ABC-CLIO, 1998. ISBN 0874368871.
- Boyer, Paul S., Melvyn Dubofsky. The Oxford companion to United States history. Oxford University Press, 2001. ISBN 0195082095.
- Bradley, David, Shelley Fisher Fishkin. The encyclopedia of civil rights in America. Sharpe Reference, 1998. ISBN 0765680009.
- Browne, Ray Broadus, Pat Browne. The guide to United States popular culture. Bowling Green State University Popular Press, 2001. ISBN 0879728213.
- Buenker, John D., Joseph Buenker. Encyclopedia of the Gilded Age and Progressive Era. Sharpe Reference, 2005. ISBN 0765680513.
- Carruth, Gorton. The Encyclopedia of American Facts and Dates. 9th ed., HarperCollins, 1997. ISBN 0062701924.
- Cayton, Mary Kupiec, Peter W. Williams. Encyclopedia of American cultural and intellectual history. Scribner, 2001. ISBN 0684805618.
- Cayton, Mary Kupiec, Elliott J. Gorn, Peter W. Williams. Encyclopedia of American Social History. Scribner's; Maxwell Macmillan Canada; Maxwell Macmillan International, 1993. ISBN 0684192462.
- Ciment, James. Colonial America: An encyclopedia of social, political, cultural, and economic history. Sharpe Reference, 2006. ISBN 0765680653.
- Ciment, James. Encyclopedia of American immigration. M.E. Sharpe, 2001. ISBN 0765680289.
- Ciment, James, Thaddeus Russell. The home front encyclopedia: United States, Britain, and Canada in World Wars I and II. ABC-CLIO, 2007. ISBN 978-1-57607-849-5.
- Ciment, James. Postwar America: An encyclopedia of social, political, cultural, and economic history. M. E. Sharpe, 2006. ISBN 076568067X.
- Clinton, Catherine, Christine A. Lunardini. The Columbia guide to American women in the nineteenth century. Columbia University Press, 2000. ISBN 0231109202.
- Concise Dictionary of American History. Scribner's, 1983.
- Corps, Terry. Historical dictionary of the Jacksonian era and Manifest Destiny. Scarecrow Press, 2006. ISBN 0810854538.
- Cullen-DuPont, Kathryn. Encyclopedia of women's history in America. Facts on File, 2000. ISBN 0816041008.
- Davis, Richard C. Encyclopedia of American forest and conservation history. Macmillan; Collier Macmillan, 1983. ISBN 0029073502.
- DeConde, Alexander, Richard Dean Burns, Fredrik Logevall. Encyclopedia of American foreign policy. Scribner, 2002. ISBN 0684806576.
- Dictionary of American Biography. Scribner's, 1928-.
- Duchak, Alicia. A–Z of modern America. Routledge, 1999. ISBN 0415187559.
- Encyclopedia of the North American Colonies. 1993.
- Faragher, John M. The Encyclopedia of Colonial and Revolutionary America. Facts on File, 1989.
- Ferris, William. The Greenwood encyclopedia of American regional cultures. Greenwood Press, 2004. ISBN 0313332665.
- Finkelman, Paul. Encyclopedia of the new American nation: The emergence of the United States, 1754–1829. Charles Scribner's Sons; Thomson Gale, 2006. ISBN 0684313464.
- Foner, Eric. Freedom's lawmakers: A directory of black officeholders during Reconstruction. Louisiana State University Press, 1996. ISBN 0807120820.
- Foner, Eric and John Garraty. The Reader's Companion to American History. Houghton Mifflin, 1991.
- Frazier, Donald S. The United States and Mexico at war: Nineteenth-century expansionism and conflict. Macmillan Reference USA, 1998. ISBN 0028646061.
- Goldfield, David R. Encyclopedia of American urban history. Sage, 2007. ISBN 0761928847.
- Gordon, Lois G., Alan Gordon. American chronicle: Year by year through the twentieth century. Yale University Press, 1999. ISBN 0300075871.
- Hahn, Peter L. Historical dictionary of United States–Middle East relations. Scarecrow Press, 2007. ISBN 978-0-8108-5549-6.
- Johnson, Thomas Herbert. Oxford Companion to American History. Oxford University Press, 1966.
- Kammen, Carol, Norma Prendergast. Encyclopedia of local history. AltaMira Press, 2000. ISBN 0742503992.
- Kane, Joseph Nathan. Facts About the Presidents. 6th ed., H. W. Wilson, 1993.
- Kane, Joseph Nathan. Facts About the States. H. W. Wilson, 1989.
- Kane, Joseph Nathan, Steven Anzovin, Janet Podell. Famous first facts: A record of first happenings, discoveries, and inventions in American history. H. W. Wilson, 2006. ISBN 0824210654.
- Knight, Peter. Conspiracy theories in American history: An encyclopedia. ABC-CLIO, 2003. ISBN 1576078124.
- Kumaraswamy, P. R. Historical dictionary of the Arab-Israeli conflict. Scarecrow Press, 2006. ISBN 0810853434.
- Kutler Stanley I. Dictionary of American history. Charles Scribner's Sons, 2003. ISBN 0684805332.
- Kutler, Stanley I., Robert Dallek, David A. Hollinger. Encyclopedia of the United States in the twentieth century. Charles Scribner's Sons; Simon & Schuster; Prentice Hall International, 1996. ISBN 0132105357.
- Mankiller, Wilma Pearl. The reader's companion to U.S. women's history. Houghton Mifflin, 1998. ISBN 0395671736.
- Matray, James Irving. East Asia and the United States: An encyclopedia of relations since 1784. Greenwood Press, 2002. ISBN 0313305579.
- Mays, Dorothy A. Women in early America: Struggle, survival, and freedom in a new world. ABC-CLIO, 2004. ISBN 1851094296.
- McElvaine, Robert S. Encyclopedia of the Great Depression. Macmillan Reference USA, 2004. ISBN 0028656865.
- Middleton, Ken. American women's history: A research guide. .
- Moreno, Barry. Encyclopedia of Ellis Island. Greenwood Press, 2004. ISBN 0313326827.
- Morris, Richard B. Encyclopedia of American History. 6th ed., HarperCollins, 1982.
- Morris, Richard Brandon and Jeffrey Brandon Morris. Encyclopedia of American history. HarperCollins, 1996. ISBN 0062700553.
- Ness, Immanuel, Stephen Eric Bronner, Frances Fox Piven. Encyclopedia of American social movements. Sharpe Reference, 2004. ISBN 0765680459.
- Olson, James S. and Susan Wladaver-Morgan. Dictionary of United States Economic History. Greenwood, 1992.
- Porter, Glenn. Encyclopedia of American Economic History: Studies of the Principal Movements and Ideas. Scribner's, 1980.
- Queen, Edward L., Stephen R. Prothero, Gardiner H. Shattuck. Encyclopedia of American religious history. Facts on File, 2001. ISBN 0816043353.
- Schlesinger, Arthur, Jr. Almanac of American History.
- Scribner Desk Dictionary of American History. Scribner's, 1984.
- Shavit, David. United States in Asia: A Historical Dictionary. Greenwood, 1990. ISBN 0313253412.
- Shifflett, Crandall A. Victorian America, 1876 to 1913. Facts on File, 1996. ISBN 0816025312.
- Sifakis, Carl. The mafia encyclopedia. Facts on File, 2005. ISBN 0816056943.
- Smith, Joseph. Historical dictionary of United States–Latin American relations. Scarecrow Press, 2007. ISBN 0810855291.
- Sutter, Robert G. Historical dictionary of Chinese foreign policy. Scarecrow Press, 2011. ISBN 9780810868601.
- The United States in Africa: A Historical Dictionary. Greenwood, 1989.
- The United States in Asia: A Historical Dictionary. Greenwood, 1990.
- The United States in the Middle East: A Historical Dictionary. Greenwood, 1988.
- Tucker, Spencer D., James Arnold, Roberta Wiener, Paul G. Pierpaoli, Jack McCallum, Justin D. Murphy. The encyclopedia of the Spanish-American and Philippine-American wars: A political, social, and military history. ABC-CLIO, 2009. ISBN 9781851099511.
- Urdang, Laurence. Timetables of American History. Simon & Schuster, 1981.
- Van Sant, John E., Peter Mauch, Yoneyuki Sugita. Historical dictionary of United States–Japan relations. Scarecrow Press, 2007. ISBN 978-0-8108-5608-0.
- Wakelyn, Jon L. Birth of the Bill of Rights: Encyclopedia of the Antifederalists. Greenwood Press, 2004. ISBN 0313317399.
- Weatherbee, Donald E. Historical dictionary of United States–Southeast Asia relations. Scarecrow Press, 2008. ISBN 978-0-8108-5542-7.
- Wintz, Cary D., Paul Finkelman. Encyclopedia of the Harlem Renaissance. Routledge, 2004. ISBN 157958389X.
- Wynar, Lubomyr Roman, Anna T. Wynar. Encyclopedic directory of ethnic newspapers and periodicals in the United States. Libraries Unlimited, 1976. ISBN 0872871541.
- Yanak, Ted and Pam Cornelison. Great American History Fact-Finder. Houghton Mifflin, 1993.

====== Alaska ======
- Hayes, Derek. Historical atlas of the Arctic. Douglas and McIntyre; University of Washington Press, 2003. ISBN 1553650042.
- Holland, Clive. Arctic exploration and development, c. 500 B.C. to 1915: An encyclopedia. Garland Publ., 1994. ISBN 0824076486.
- Mills, William J. Exploring polar frontiers: A historical encyclopedia. ABC-CLIO, 2003. ISBN 1576074226.
- Nuttall, Mark. Encyclopedia of the Arctic. Routledge, 2005. ISBN 1579584365.

====== American West ======
- Cusic, Don. Cowboys and the Wild West: An A–Z guide from the Chisholm Trail to the silver screen. Facts on File, 1994. ISBN 0816027838.
- Lamar, Howard Roberts. The new encyclopedia of the American West. Yale University Press, 1998. ISBN 0300070888.
- Lamar, Howard R. The Reader's Encyclopedia of the American West. HarperCollins, 1977.
- McLoughlin, Denis. Wild and Woolly: An Encyclopedia of the American West. Doubleday, 1975.
- Nestor, Sandy. Silver and gold mining camps of the old West: A state by state American encyclopedia. McFarland, 2007. ISBN 9780786428137.

====== Midwest ======
- Sisson, Richard, Christian K. Zacher, Andrew R. L. Cayton. The American Midwest: An interpretive encyclopedia. Indiana University Press, 2007. ISBN 0253348862.

====== New England ======
- Feintuch, Burt, David H. Watters. The encyclopedia of New England: The culture and history of an American region. Yale University Press, 2005. ISBN 0300100272.

====== Southern United States ======
- Current, Richard Nelson, Paul D. Escott. Encyclopedia of the Confederacy. Simon & Schuster, 1993–. ISBN 0132759918.
- Richter, William L. Historical dictionary of the Old South. Scarecrow Press, 2006. ISBN 0810850745.
- Riley, Sam G. Magazines of the American South. Greenwood Press, 1986. ISBN 0313243379.
- Twyman, Robert W. and David C. Roller. The Encyclopedia of Southern History. Louisiana State University Press, 1979.
- Volo, James M., Dorothy Denneen Volo. Encyclopedia of the antebellum South. Greenwood Press, 2000. ISBN 0313308861.
- Wilson, Charles Reagen, James G. Thomas, Ann J. Abadie, University of Mississippi. The new encyclopedia of Southern culture. University of North Carolina Press, 2006–2007. ISBN 9780807830031.

==== South America ====
- Balderston, Daniel, Mike Gonzalez, Ana M. López. Encyclopedia of contemporary Latin American and Caribbean cultures. Routledge, 2000. ISBN 041513188X.
- Collier, Simon, Thomas E. Skidmore, Harold Blakemore. The Cambridge encyclopedia of Latin America and the Caribbean. Cambridge University Press, 1992. ISBN 0521413222.
- Gunson, Phil, Andrew Thompson, Greg Chamberlain. The dictionary of contemporary politics of South America. Routledge, 1989. ISBN 0415028086.
- Hallewell, Laurence. Historical dictionaries of Latin America. Scarecrow, 1967–. ISSN 1931-874X.
- Kinsbruner, Jay, Erick Detlef Langer. Encyclopedia of Latin American history and culture. Gale, 2008. ISBN 9780684312705.
- Sader, Emir. Latinoamericana: Enciclopedia contemporanea da America Latina e do Caribe. Laboratorio de Politicas Publicas; Boitempo Editorial, [2006?]. ISBN 8575590847.
- Smith, Joseph. Historical dictionary of United States–Latin American relations. Scarecrow Press, 2007. ISBN 0810855291.
- Tenenbaum, Barbara A. Latin America, history and culture: An encyclopedia for students. Macmillan Library Reference, 1999. ISBN 0684805766.

===== Argentina =====
- Chávez, Fermín, Roberto Vilchez, Enrique Manson, Lorenzo González. Diccionario histórico argentino. Ediciones Fabro, 2005. ISBN 9872166609.
- de Santillan, Diego Abad. Gran enciclopedia argentina. Ediar, 1956–1964.
- Ezquerra, Jaime Alvar. Diccionario Espasa historia de España y América. Espasa, 2002. ISBN 8467003162.
- Kohut, David R., Olga Vilella, Beatric Julian. Historical dictionary of the "dirty wars". Scarecrow Press, 2003. ISBN 0810848538.

===== Bolivia =====
- Barnadas, Josep M., Guillermo Calvo, Juan Ticlla Grupo de Estudios Históricos. Diccionario histórico de Bolivia. Grupo de Estudios Históricos, 2002. ISBN 8483702770.
- Ezquerra, Jaime Alvar. Diccionario Espasa historia de España y América. Espasa, 2002. ISBN 8467003162.
- Sagárnaga M., J. Antonio. Breve diccionario de la cultura nativa en Bolivia. Producciones Cima, [2002].

===== Brazil =====
- Brasil A/Z: Enciclopédia alfabética em um único volume. Editora Universo, 1988. ISBN 8585222212.
- de Oliveira, José Teixeira and Affonso d'Escragnolle Taunay. Dicionário brasileiro de datas históricas. Editora Vozes, 2002. ISBN 853262698X.
- Ezquerra, Jaime Alvar. Diccionario Espasa historia de España y América. Espasa, 2002. ISBN 8467003162.
- Flores, Moacyr. Dicionário de história do Brasil. EDIPUCRS, 2004. ISBN 8574302090.
- Lopes, Nei. Enciclopédia brasileira da diáspora africana. Selo Negro Edições, 2004. ISBN 8587478214.
- Vainfas, Renaldo. Dicionário do Brasil colonial, 1500–1808. Objetiva, 2000. ISBN 8573023201.
- Vainfas, Renaldo. Dicionário do Brasil imperial, 1822–1889. Objetiva, 2002. ISBN 8573024410.

===== Chile =====
- Céspedes, Mario, & Lelia Garreaud. Gran diccionario de Chile: Biográfico-cultural. Importadora Alfa, 1988.
- Ezquerra, Jaime Alvar. Diccionario Espasa historia de España y América. Espasa, 2002. ISBN 8467003162.
- Kohut, David R., Olga Vilella, Beatric Julian. Historical dictionary of the "dirty wars". Scarecrow Press, 2003. ISBN 0810848538.
- Vergara, Abraham Quezada. Diccionario de conceptos históricos y geográficos de Chile. RIL Editores, 2004. ISBN 9562843572.

====== Rapa Nui ======
- West, Barbara A. Encyclopedia of the peoples of Asia and Oceania. Facts On File, 2009. ISBN 9780816071098.

===== Colombia =====
- Ezquerra, Jaime Alvar. Diccionario Espasa historia de España y América. Espasa, 2002. ISBN 8467003162.
- Medellín, Jorge Alejandro, & Diana Fajardo Rivera. Diccionario de Colombia. Grupo Editorial Norma, 2005. ISBN 9580485615.
- Melo, Jorge Orlando, José Antonio Ocampo. Gran enciclopedia de Colombia: Temática. Círculo de Lectores, c1991–c1994. ISBN 9582802944.

===== Ecuador =====
- Albuja, Ana Maria Cadena. Este es mi país Ecuador: Enciclopedia temática-alfabética. Grupo Cultural, 2006. ISBN 9978322191.
- Ezquerra, Jaime Alvar. Diccionario Espasa historia de España y América. Espasa, 2002. ISBN 8467003162.
- Neto, Paulo de Carvalho. Diccionario del folklore ecuatoriano. Editorial Casa de la Cultura Ecuatoriana, 2001. ISBN 9789978622018.
- Noboa, Fernando Jurado. Diccionario histórico genealógico de apellidos y familias de origen quechua, aymara y araucano (Ecuador). Temístocles Hernández, 2002. ISBN 9978424075.
- Ponce, Javier. Enciclopedia Ecuador a su alcance. Espasa, 2004. ISBN 9978983244.

===== Falkland Islands =====
- Gascoigne, Bamber. Encyclopedia of Britain. Macmillan, 1993. ISBN 0028971426.

===== French Guiana =====
- Corzani, Jack. Dictionnaire encyclopedique Desormeaux. Editions Desormeuax, [1992–1993]. ISBN 2852750201.
- Sellier, Jean, Anne. Le Fur, Bertrand de Brun. Atlas historique des provinces et régions de France: Genèse d'un peuple. La Découverte, 1997. ISBN 2707127515.

===== Guyana =====
- Balkaran, Lal. Dictionary of the Guyanese Amerindians and other South American native terms: An A–Z guide to their anthropology, cosmology, culture, exploration, history, geography, legend, folklore and myth. LBA, 2002. ISBN 0969983387.
- Gascoigne, Bamber. Encyclopedia of Britain. Macmillan, 1993. ISBN 0028971426.
- National History & Arts Council. Dictionary of Guyanese folklore. National History & Arts Council, 1975.

===== Paraguay =====
- Alvar Ezquerra, Jaime. Diccionario Espasa historia de España y América. Espasa, 2002. ISBN 8467003162.

===== Peru =====
- Brown, Fortunato. Todo el Perú 1996: Breve enciclopedia peruana. Ediciones Brown, 1996. OCLC 253829698.
- Enciclopedia tematica del Peru. El Comerio, 2004. ISBN 9972752003.
- Alvar Ezquerra, Jaime. Diccionario Espasa historia de España y América. Espasa, 2002. ISBN 8467003162.

===== Suriname =====
- Friedrich, Conrad, Albert Bruijning, Jan Voorhoeve, M. Gordijn. Encyclopedie van Suriname. Elsevier, 1977. ISBN 9010018423.

===== Uruguay =====
- Alvar Ezquerra, Jaime. Diccionario Espasa historia de España y América. Espasa, 2002. ISBN 8467003162.
- Kohut, David R., Olga Vilella, Beatrice Julian. Historical Dictionary of the "Dirty Wars". Scarecrow Press, 2003. ISBN 0810848538.

===== Venezuela =====
- Rodriguez Campos, Manuel & Sara Colmenares. Diccionario de historia de Venezuela. Fundacion Polar, 1997. ISBN 9806397371.
- Alvar Ezquerra, Jaime. Diccionario Espasa historia de España y América. Espasa, 2002. ISBN 8467003162.
- Gran enciclopedia de Venezuela. Globe, c1998–c2001. ISBN 9806427009.
- Sanz, Rodolfo. Diccionario para uso de chavistas, chavólogos y antichavistas. Editorial Nuevo Pensamiento Crítico, 2004. ISBN 9801206527.
- Strauss, Rafael A., Nelson Garrido. Diccionario de cultura popular. Fundación Bigott, [1999]. ISBN 9806428137.

=== Antarctica ===
- Gascoigne, Bamber. Encyclopedia of Britain. Macmillan, 1993. ISBN 0028971426.
- Mills, William J. Exploring Polar Frontiers: A historical encyclopedia. ABC-Clio, 2003. ISBN 1576074226.
- Riffenburgh, Beau. Encyclopedia of the Antarctic. Routledge, 2007. ISBN 0415970245.

==== South Georgia and the South Sandwich Islands ====
- Gascoigne, Bamber. Encyclopedia of Britain. Macmillan, 1993. ISBN 0028971426.

=== Asia ===
- Embree, Ainslie Thomas, Asia Society. Encyclopedia of Asian history. Scribner; Collier Macmillan, 1988. ISBN 0684186195.
- Ghazanfar, Shaikh M. Islamic civilization: History, contributions, and influence: A compendium of literature. Scarecrow Press, 2006. ISBN 0810852640.
- Shavit, David. United States in Asia: A Historical Dictionary. Greenwood, 1990.
- West, Barbara A. Encyclopedia of the peoples of Asia and Oceania. Facts On File, 2009. ISBN 9780816071098.

==== Central Asia ====
- Buell, Paul D. Historical dictionary of the Mongol world empire. Scarecrow Press, 2003. ISBN 0810845717.
- Dani, Ahmad Hasan, V. M. Masson, UNESCO. History of civilizations of Central Asia. UNESCO, 1992–.
- East Asian Curriculum Project, Columbia University. The Mongols in world history. East Asian Curriculum Project. Available online here.
- Embree, Ainslie Thomas, Asia Society. Encyclopedia of Asian history. Scribner; Collier Macmillan, 1988. ISBN 0684186195.
- Levinson, David Karen Christensen. Encyclopedia of modern Asia. Charles Scribner's Sons, 2002. ISBN 0684806177.
- Rhyne, George N., Edward J. Lazzerini, Bruce Friend Adams. The supplement to the modern encyclopedia of Russian, Soviet and Eurasian history. Academic International Press, 1995–. ISBN 0875691420.
- Somel, Selçuk Akşin. Historical dictionary of the Ottoman Empire. Scarecrow Press, 2003. ISBN 0810843323.

===== Kazakhstan =====
- Hanks, Reuel R. Central Asia: A global studies handbook. ABC-CLIO, 2005. ISBN 1851096566.

===== Kyrgyzstan =====
- Abazov, Rafis. Historical dictionary of Kyrgyzstan. Scarecrow Press, 2004. ISBN 0810848686.
- Hanks, Reuel R. Central Asia: A global studies handbook. ABC-CLIO, 2005. ISBN 1851096566.

===== Tajikistan =====
- Abdullaev, Kamoludin, Shahram Akbarzadeh. Historical dictionary of Tajikistan. Scarecrow Press, 2002. ISBN 0810841843.

===== Turkmenistan =====
- Abazov, Rafis. Historical dictionary of Turkmenistan. Scarecrow Press, 2005. ISBN 0810853620.

===== Uzbekistan =====
- Coughlin, Kathryn M. Muslim cultures today: A reference guide. Greenwood Press, 2006. ISBN 0313323860.
- Hanks, Reuel R. Central Asia: A global studies handbook. ABC-CLIO, 2005. ISBN 1851096566.

==== East Asia ====
- Levinson, David Karen Christensen. Encyclopedia of modern Asia. Charles Scribner's Sons, 2002. ISBN 0684806177.
- Matray, James Irving. East Asia and the United States: An encyclopedia of relations since 1784. Greenwood Press, 2002. ISBN 0313305579.

===== China =====
- Buell, Paul D. Historical dictionary of the Mongol world empire. Scarecrow Press, 2003. ISBN 0810845717.
- Cheng, Linsun, Kerry Brown. Berkshire encyclopedia of China: Modern and historic views of the world's newest and oldest global power. Berkshire, 2009. ISBN 9780977015948.
- Darvis, Edward Lawrence. Encyclopedia of contemporary Chinese culture. Routledge, 2005. ISBN 0415241294.
- East Asian Curriculum Project, Columbia University. The Mongols in world history. East Asian Curriculum Project. Available online here.
- Gao, James Zheng. Historical dictionary of modern China (1800-1949). Scarecrow Press, 2009. ISBN 9780810849303.
- Guo, Jian, Yongyi Song, Yuan Zhou. Historical dictionary of the Chinese Cultural Revolution. Scarecrow Press, 2006. ISBN 0810854619.
- Historical Dictionary of Revolutionary China, 1839-1976, Greenwood, 1992.
- James, C. V., Chung-kuo she hui kʻo hsüeh yüan; Chung-kuo she hui kʻo hsüeh chʻu pan she. Information China: The comprehensive and authoritative reference source of new China. Pergamon Press, 1989. ISBN 0080347649.
- LaFleur, Robert André. China: A global studies handbook. ABC-CLIO, 2003. ISBN 1576072843.
- Leese, Daniel. Brill's encyclopedia of China. Brill, 2009. ISBN 9789004168633.
- Leung, Pak-Wah. Historical dictionary of revolutionary China, 1839–1976. Greenwood Press, 1992. ISBN 0313264570.
- Lieberthal, Kenneth, Bruce J. Dickson. A research guide to central party and government meetings in China, 1949–1986. M.E. Sharpe, 1989. ISBN 0873324927.
- Lin, Chun, Hans Hendrischke. The territories of the People's Republic of China. Routledge, 2006. ISBN 1857433955.
- Luo, Jing, Aimin Chen, Shunfeng Song. China today: An encyclopedia of life in the People's Republic. Greenwood Press, 2005. ISBN 0313321701.
- Michaud, Jean. Historical dictionary of the peoples of the Southeast Asian massif. Scarecrow Press, 2006. ISBN 081085466X.
- Olson, James Stuart. An ethnohistorical dictionary of China. Greenwood Press, 1998. ISBN 0313288534.
- O'Neill, Hugh. Companion to Chinese History. Facts on File, 1987.
- Pong, David. Encyclopedia of modern China. Charles Scribner's Sons/Gale, Cengage Learning, c2009. ISBN 9780684315669.
- Sullivan, Lawrence R. Historical dictionary of the People's Republic of China. Scarecrow Press, 2007. ISBN 978-0-8108-5380-5.
- Sullivan, Lawrence R., Nancy R. Hearst. Historical dictionary of the People's Republic of China, 1949–1997. Scarecrow Press, 1997. ISBN 0810833492.
- Sutter, Robert G. Historical dictionary of Chinese foreign policy. Scarecrow Press, 2011. ISBN 9780810868601.
- Tiedemann, R. G. Reference guide to Christian missionary societies in China: From the sixteenth to the twentieth century. M.E. Sharpe, 2009. ISBN 9780765618085.
- Wang, Ke-Wen. Modern China: An encyclopedia of history, culture, and nationalism. Garland Publishing, 1998. ISBN 0815307209.
- Wortzel, Larry M., Robin D. S. Higham. Dictionary of contemporary Chinese military history. Greenwood Press, 1999. ISBN 0313293376.
- Xiong, Victor Cunrui. Historical dictionary of medieval China. Scarecrow Press, 2009. ISBN 9780810860537.

====== Hong Kong ======
- Chan, Ming K., Shiu-Hing Lo. Historical dictionary of the Hong Kong SAR and the Macao SAR. Scarecrow Press, 2006. ISBN 0810850613.
- Roberts, Elfed Vaughan, Ngai-Ling Sum, Peter Bradshaw. Historical dictionary of Hong Kong and Macau. Scarecrow Press, 1992. ISBN 0810825740.
- Sutter, Robert G. Historical dictionary of Chinese foreign policy. Scarecrow Press, 2011. ISBN 9780810868601.

====== Macau ======
- Chan, Ming K., Shiu-Hing Lo. Historical dictionary of the Hong Kong SAR and the Macao SAR. Scarecrow Press, 2006. ISBN 0810850613.
- Roberts, Elfed Vaughan, Ngai-Ling Sum, Peter Bradshaw. Historical dictionary of Hong Kong and Macau. Scarecrow Press, 1992. ISBN 0810825740.

===== Japan =====
- Bowring, Richard John, Peter F. Kornicki. The Cambridge encyclopedia of Japan. Cambridge University Press, 1993. ISBN 0521403529.
- Ellington, Lucien. Japan: A global studies handbook. ABC CLIO, 2002. ISBN 1576072711.
- Embree, Ainslie Thomas, Asia Society. Encyclopedia of Asian history. Scribner; Collier Macmillan, 1988. ISBN 0684186195.
- Hoover, William D. Historical dictionary of postwar Japan. Scarecrow Press, 2011. ISBN 9780810854604.
- Huffman, James L. Modern Japan: An encyclopedia of history, culture, and nationalism. Garland Publishing, 1998.
- Hunter, Janet. Concise Dictionary of Modern Japanese History. University of California Press, 1984.
- Kodansha Encyclopedia of Japan. Kodansha, 2002. Available online here.
- Kokushi Daijiten Henshū Iinkai. Kokushi Daijiten. Yoshikawa Kobunkan, 1979–1997. ISBN 4642005013(v.1).
- Perez, Louis G. Japan at war: an encyclopedia. ABC-CLIO, 2013. ISBN 9781598847413.
- Stockwin, J. A. A. Dictionary of the modern politics of Japan. Routledge Curzon, 2003. ISBN 0415151708.
- Van Sant, John E., Peter Mauch, Yoneyuki Sugita. Historical dictionary of United States–Japan relations. Scarecrow Press, 2007. ISBN 978-0-8108-5608-0.

===== North Korea =====
- Connor, Mary E. The Koreas: A global studies handbook. ABC-CLIO, 2002. ISBN 1576072770.
- Embree, Ainslie Thomas, Asia Society. Encyclopedia of Asian history. Scribner; Collier Macmillan, 1988. ISBN 0684186195.
- Kim, Ilpyong J. Historical dictionary of North Korea. Scarecrow Press, 2003. ISBN 0810843315.
- Pratt, Keith L., Richard Rutt, James Hoare. Korea: A historical and cultural dictionary. Curzon Press, 1999. ISBN 0700704647; ISBN 0700704639 (pbk.)
- Yŏnhap Tʻongsin. North Korea handbook. M.E. Sharpe, 2002. ISBN 0765610043.

====== Korean War ======
- Lentz, Robert J. Korean War filmography: 91 English language features through 2000. McFarland, 2003. ISBN 0786410469.
- Matray, James. Historical Dictionary of the Korean War. Greenwood, 1991.
- Summers, Harry G. Korean War Almanac. Facts on File, 1990.
- Spencer Tucker, Paul G. Pierpaoli, Jinwung Kim, Xiaobing Li, James Irving Matray. The encyclopedia of the Korean War: A political, social, and military history. ABC-CLIO, 2010. ISBN 9781851098491.

===== South Korea =====
- Connor, Mary E. The Koreas: A global studies handbook. ABC-CLIO, 2002. ISBN 1576072770.
- Embree, Ainslie Thomas, Asia Society. Encyclopedia of Asian history. Scribner; Collier Macmillan, 1988. ISBN 0684186195.
- Nahm, Andrew C., James Hoare. Historical dictionary of the Republic of Korea. Scarecrow Press, 2004.
- Pratt, Keith L., Richard Rutt, James Hoare. Korea: A historical and cultural dictionary. Curzon Press, 1999. ISBN 0700704647; ISBN 0700704639 (pbk.)

====== Korean War ======
- Lentz, Robert J. Korean War filmography: 91 English language features through 2000. McFarland, 2003. ISBN 0786410469.
- Matray, James. Historical Dictionary of the Korean War. Greenwood, 1991.
- Summers, Harry G. Korean War Almanac. Facts on File, 1990.
- Spencer Tucker, Paul G. Pierpaoli, Jinwung Kim, Xiaobing Li, James Irving Matray. The encyclopedia of the Korean War: A political, social, and military history. ABC-CLIO, 2010. ISBN 9781851098491.

===== Mongolia =====
- Atwood, Christopher Pratt. Encyclopedia of Mongolia and the Mongol empire. Facts On File, 2004. ISBN 0816046719.
- Sanders, Alan J. K. Historical dictionary of Mongolia. Scarecrow Press, 2010. ISBN 9780810861916.

===== Taiwan =====
- Cooper, John Franklin. Historical dictionary of Taiwan (Republic of China). Scarecrow Press, 2007. ISBN 978-0-8108-5600-4.
- Lin, Chun, Hans Hendrischke. The territories of the People's Republic of China. Routledge, 2006. ISBN 1857433955.
- Olson, James Stuart. An ethnohistorical dictionary of China. Greenwood Press, 1998. ISBN 0313288534.
- Sutter, Robert G. Historical dictionary of Chinese foreign policy. Scarecrow Press, 2011. ISBN 9780810868601.

==== Middle East ====
- Buell, Paul D. Historical dictionary of the Mongol world empire. Scarecrow Press, 2003. ISBN 0810845717.
- East Asian Curriculum Project, Columbia University. The Mongols in world history. East Asian Curriculum Project. Available online here.
- Hahn, Peter L. Historical dictionary of United States–Middle East relations. Scarecrow Press, 2007. ISBN 978-0-8108-5549-6.
- Hiro, Dilip. The essential Middle East: A comprehensive guide. Carroll & Graf, 2003. ISBN 0786712694.
- International encyclopaedia for the Middle Ages (IEMA): A supplement to LexMA-online. Brepols. Available online here.
- Lexikon des Mittelalters online (LexMA). Brepols. Available online here. (German).
- Mattar, Philip. Encyclopedia of the modern Middle East and North Africa. Macmillan Reference USA, 2004. ISBN 0028657691.
- Shavit, David. United States in Asia: A Historical Dictionary. Greenwood, 1990. ISBN 0313253412.
- Talhami, Ghada Hashem. Historical dictionary of women in the Middle East and North Africa. Scarecrow Press, 2013. ISBN 9780810868588.

===== Byzantium =====
- Kazhdan, Alexander B. The Oxford Dictionary of Byzantium. Oxford University Press, 1991. ISBN 014051323X.

==== Russia ====
- A. I. Podberezkin Dukhovnoe nasledie. Rossiia—2000: Sovremennaia politicheskaia istoriia (1985–1999 gody). Vserossiiskoe obshchestvenno-politicheskoe dvizhenie v podderzhku otechestvennoi nauki, kultury, obrazovaniia, zdravookhraneniia i predprinimatel'stva "Dukhovnoe nasledie": RAU-Korporatsiia, 2000. ISBN 586014122X.
- Bienkowski, Piotr, A. R. Millard. Dictionary of the ancient Near East. University of Pennsylvania Press, 2000. ISBN 0812235576.
- Blackwell Encyclopedia of the Russian Revolution. Blackwell, 1988.
- Coughlin, Kathryn M. Muslim cultures today: A reference guide. Greenwood Press, 2006. ISBN 0313323860.
- Hayes, Derek. Historical atlas of the Arctic. Douglas and McIntyre; University of Washington Press, 2003. ISBN 1553650042.
- Holland, Clive. Arctic exploration and development, c. 500 B.C. to 1915: An encyclopedia. Garland Publ., 1994. ISBN 0824076486.
- Jackson, George D., Robert James Devlin. Dictionary of the Russian Revolution. Greenwood Press, 1989. ISBN 0313211310.
- Langer, Lawrence N. Historical dictionary of medieval Russia. Scarecrow Press, 2002. ISBN 0810840804.
- Mills, William J. Exploring polar frontiers: A historical encyclopedia. ABC-CLIO, 2003. ISBN 1576074226.
- Nuttall, Mark. Encyclopedia of the Arctic. Routledge, 2005. ISBN 1579584365.
- Paxton, John. Encyclopedia of Russian History: From the Christianization of Kiev to the Breakup of the USSR. ABC-Clio, 1993.
- Rhyne, George N., Edward J. Lazzerini, Bruce Friend Adams. The supplement to the modern encyclopedia of Russian, Soviet and Eurasian history. Academic International Press, 1995–. ISBN 0875691420.
- Shmidt, S. O., M. I. Andreev, V. M. Karev. Moskva: Entsiklopediia. Bol'shaia Rossiiskaia entsiklopediia, 1998. ISBN 5852702773.

===== Soviet Union =====
- Sovet Narodnykh Komissarov SSSR, Sovet Ministrov SSSR, Kabinet Ministrov SSSR, 1923–1991: Entsiklopedicheskii spravochnik. Izd-vo obʺedineniia "Mosgorarkhiv", 1999. ISBN 5722800686.

==== South Asia ====
- Embree, Ainslie Thomas, Asia Society. Encyclopedia of Asian history. Scribner; Collier Macmillan, 1988. ISBN 0684186195.
- Levinson, David Karen Christensen. Encyclopedia of modern Asia. Charles Scribner's Sons, 2002. ISBN 0684806177.

===== Afghanistan =====
- Adamec, Ludwig W. Historical dictionary of Afghan wars, revolutions, and insurgencies. Scarecrow Press, 2005. ISBN 0810849488.
- Adamec, Ludwig W. Historical dictionary of Afghanistan. Scarecrow Press, 2003. ISBN 081084852X.
- Clements, Frank A. Conflict in Afghanistan: A historical encyclopedia. ABC-CLIO, 2003. ISBN 1851094024.
- Coughlin, Kathryn M. Muslim cultures today: A reference guide. Greenwood Press, 2006. ISBN 0313323860.

===== Bangladesh =====
- Gascoigne, Bamber. Encyclopedia of Britain. Macmillan, 1993. ISBN 0028971426.
- Rahman, Syedur, Craig Baxter. Historical dictionary of Bangladesh. Scarecrow Press, 2010. ISBN 9780810867666.
- Wolpert, Stanley A. Encyclopedia of India. Charles Scribner's Sons, Thomson Gale, 2006. ISBN 0684313499.

===== British Indian Ocean Territory =====
- Gascoigne, Bamber. Encyclopedia of Britain. Macmillan, 1993. ISBN 0028971426.

===== India =====
- Battacherje, S. B. Encyclopaedia of Indian events and dates. New Dawn Press, 2006. ISBN 193270549X.
- Bhattacharyya, Narendra Nath. The Geographical dictionary: Ancient and early medieval India. Munshiram Manoharlal Publishers, 1991. ISBN 8121500788.
- Blackwell, Frita. India: A global studies handbook. ABC-CLIO, 2004. ISBN 1576073483.
- Coughlin, Kathryn M. Muslim cultures today: A reference guide. Greenwood Press, 2006. ISBN 0313323860.
- Gascoigne, Bamber. Encyclopedia of Britain. Macmillan, 1993. ISBN 0028971426.
- Ghosh, A. An Encyclopedia of Indian Archaeology. Munshiram Manoharlal, 1989.
- Kapoor, Subodh. The Indian encyclopaedia: Biographical, historical, religious, administrative, ethnological, commercial and scientific. Cosmo Publications, 2002. ISBN 8177552570.
- Khan, Iqtidar Alam. Historical dictionary of medieval India. Scarecrow Press, 2008. ISBN 978-0-8108-5503-8.
- Mansighn, Surjit. Historical dictionary of India. Scarecrow Press, 2006. ISBN 0810847701.
- Mehra, Parshotam. Dictionary of Modern Indian History, 1707-1947. Oxford University Press, 1985.
- Olson, James Stuart. An ethnohistorical dictionary of China. Greenwood Press, 1998. ISBN 0313288534.
- Roy, Kumkum. Historical dictionary of ancient India. Scarecrow Press, 2009. ISBN 9780810853669.
- Wolpert, Stanley A. Encyclopedia of India. Charles Scribner's Sons, Thomson Gale, 2006. ISBN 0684313499.

===== Maldives =====
- Gascoigne, Bamber. Encyclopedia of Britain. Macmillan, 1993. ISBN 0028971426.

===== Nepal =====
- Shrestha, Nanda R., Keshav Bhattarai. Historical dictionary of Nepal. Oxford: Scarecrow Press, 2003. ISBN 0810847973.
- Wolpert, Stanley A. Encyclopedia of India. Charles Scribner's Sons, Thomson Gale, 2006. ISBN 0684313499.

===== Pakistan =====
- Burki, Shahid Javed. Historical dictionary of Pakistan. Scarecrow Press, 2006. ISBN 9780810856011.
- Coughlin, Kathryn M. Muslim cultures today: A reference guide. Greenwood Press, 2006. ISBN 0313323860.
- Gascoigne, Bamber. Encyclopedia of Britain. Macmillan, 1993. ISBN 0028971426.
- Wolpert, Stanley A. Encyclopedia of India. Charles Scribner's Sons, Thomson Gale, 2006. ISBN 0684313499.

===== Sri Lanka =====
- Gascoigne, Bamber. Encyclopedia of Britain. Macmillan, 1993. ISBN 0028971426.
- Gunawardena, C. A. Encyclopedia of Sri Lanka. New Dawn Press, 2006. ISBN 1932705481.
- Samarasinghe, S. W. R. de A., Vidyamali Samarasinghe. Historical dictionary of Sri Lanka. Scarecrow Press, 1998. ISBN 0810832801.
- Wolpert, Stanley A. Encyclopedia of India. Charles Scribner's Sons, Thomson Gale, 2006. ISBN 0684313499.

==== Southeast Asia ====
- Dalby, Andrew. South East Asia: A guide to reference material. Hans Zell Publishers, 1993. ISBN 1873836007.
- Embree, Ainslie Thomas, Asia Society. Encyclopedia of Asian history. Scribner; Collier Macmillan, 1988. ISBN 0684186195.
- Levinson, David Karen Christensen. Encyclopedia of modern Asia. Charles Scribner's Sons, 2002. ISBN 0684806177.
- Miksic, John N. Historical dictionary of ancient Southeast Asia. Scarecrow Press, 2007. ISBN 0810855224.
- Oni, Keat Gin. Southeast Asia: A historical encyclopedia, from Angkor Wat to East Timor. ABC-CLIO, 2004. ISBN 1576077705.
- Weatherbee, Donald E. Historical dictionary of United States–Southeast Asia relations. Scarecrow Press, 2008. ISBN 978-0-8108-5542-7.

===== Brunei =====
- Gascoigne, Bamber. Encyclopedia of Britain. Macmillan, 1993. ISBN 0028971426.
- Sidhu, Jatswan S., Ranjit Singh. Historical dictionary of Brunei Darussalam. Scarecrow Press, 2010. ISBN 9780810859807.

===== Cambodia =====
- Corfield, Justin J., Laura Summers. Historical dictionary of Cambodia. Scarecrow Press, 2003. ISBN 0810845245.
- Michaud, Jean. Historical dictionary of the peoples of the Southeast Asian massif. Scarecrow Press, 2006. ISBN 081085466X.

===== East Timor =====
- Gunn, Geoffrey C. Historical dictionary of East Timor. Scarecrow Press, 2011. ISBN 9780810867543.

===== Indonesia =====
- Coughlin, Kathryn M. Muslim cultures today: A reference guide. Greenwood Press, 2006. ISBN 0313323860.
- Cribb, R. B. Historical dictionary of Indonesia. Scarecrow Press, 1992. ISBN 0810825422.
- Lamoureux, Florence. Indonesia: A global studies handbook. ABC-CLIO, 2003. ISBN 1576079139.
- Post, Peter, William H. Frederick, Iris Heidebrink, Shigeru Satō, William Bradley Horton, Didi Kwartanada, Nederlands Instituut voor Oorlogsdocumentatie. The encyclopedia of Indonesia in the Pacific War. Brill, 2010. ISBN 9789004168664.

===== Laos =====
- Michaud, Jean. Historical dictionary of the peoples of the Southeast Asian massif. Scarecrow Press, 2006. ISBN 081085466X.
- Stuart-Fox, Martin. Historical dictionary of Laos. Scarecrow Press, 2008. ISBN 978-0-8108-5624-0.

===== Malaysia =====
- Gascoigne, Bamber. Encyclopedia of Britain. Macmillan, 1993. ISBN 0028971426.
- Ooi, Keat Gin. Historical dictionary of Malaysia. Scarecrow Press, 2009. ISBN 9780810859555.

===== Myanmar =====
- Michaud, Jean. Historical dictionary of the peoples of the Southeast Asian massif. Scarecrow Press, 2006. ISBN 081085466X.
- Seekins, Donald M. Historical dictionary of Burma (Myanmar). Scarecrow Press, 2006. ISBN 9780810854765.

===== Philippines =====
- Guillermo, Artemio R., May Kyi Win. Historical dictionary of the Philippines. Scarecrow Press, 2005. ISBN 0810854902.
- Senate of the Philippines. Senate of the Philippines. Available online here.
- Tucker, Spencer D., James Arnold, Roberta Wiener, Paul G. Pierpaoli, Jack McCallum, Justin D. Murphy. The encyclopedia of the Spanish-American and Philippine-American wars: A political, social, and military history. ABC-CLIO, 2009. ISBN 9781851099511.
- Woods, Damon L. The Philippines: A global studies handbook. ABC-CLIO, 2006. ISBN 1851096752.

===== Singapore =====
- Corfield, Justin J., Robin Corfield. Encyclopedia of Singapore. Scarecrow Press, 2006. ISBN 0810853477.
- Corfield, Justin J., K. Mulliner. Historical dictionary of Singapore. Scarecrow Press, 2011. ISBN 9780810871847.
- Gascoigne, Bamber. Encyclopedia of Britain. Macmillan, 1993. ISBN 0028971426.

===== Thailand =====
- Michaud, Jean. Historical dictionary of the peoples of the Southeast Asian massif. Scarecrow Press, 2006. ISBN 081085466X.
- Smith, Harold E., Gayla S. Nieminen, May Kyi Win. Historical dictionary of Thailand. Scarecrow Press, 2005. ISBN 0810853965.

===== Vietnam =====
- Lockhart, Bruce McFarland, William J. Duiker. Historical dictionary of Vietnam. Scarecrow Press, 2006. ISBN 0810850532.
- Michaud, Jean. Historical dictionary of the peoples of the Southeast Asian massif. Scarecrow Press, 2006. ISBN 081085466X.
- Woods, L. Shelton. Vietnam: A global studies handbook. ABC-CLIO, 2002. ISBN 1576074161.

====== Vietnam War ======
- Anderson, David L. The Columbia guide to the Vietnam War. Columbia University Press, 2002. ISBN 0231114923.
- Frankum, Ronald Bruce. Historical dictionary of the war in Vietnam. Scarecrow Press, 2011. ISBN 9780810867963.
- Kutler, Stanley. Encyclopedia of the Vietnam War. Simon & Schuster, 1994.
- Olson, James S. Dictionary of the Vietnam War. Greenwood, 1988.
- Summers, Harry. Vietnam War Almanac. Facts on File, 1985.
- Tucker, Spencer C, Paul G. Pierpaoli, Jr., Merle L. Pribbenow II, James H. Willbanks, David T. Zabecki. The encyclopedia of the Vietnam War: A political, social, and military history. ABC-CLIO, 2011. ISBN 9781851099603.

==== Western Asia ====
- Clements, Frank. Historical dictionary of Arab and Islamic organizations. Scarecrow Press, 2001. ISBN 0810839776.
- Dumper, Michael, Bruce E. Stanley, Janet L. Abu-Lughod. Cities of the Middle East and North Africa: A historical encyclopedia. ABC-CLIO, 2007. ISBN 1576079198.
- ETANA: Electronic tools and ancient Near Eastern archives. Available online here.
- Kumaraswamy, P. R. Historical dictionary of the Arab-Israeli conflict. Scarecrow Press, 2006. ISBN 0810853434.
- Mawṣililī, Ahmad. Historical dictionary of Islamic fundamentalist movements in the Arab world, Iran, and Turkey. Scarecrow Press, 1999. ISBN 0810836092.
- Meyers, Eric M., American Schools of Oriental Research. The Oxford encyclopedia of archaeology in the Near East. Oxford University Press, 1997. ISBN 0195065123.
- Somel, Selçuk Akşin. Historical dictionary of the Ottoman Empire. Scarecrow Press, 2003. ISBN 0810843323.
- Who's who in the Arab world. Publitec Editions, 1966–. ISSN 0083-9752.

===== Armenia =====
- Adalian, Rouben Paul. Historical dictionary of Armenia. Scarecrow Press, 2002. ISBN 0810843374.
- Bienkowski, Piotr, A. R. Millard. Dictionary of the ancient Near East. University of Pennsylvania Press, 2000. ISBN 0812235576.

===== Bahrain =====
- Bienkowski, Piotr, A. R. Millard. Dictionary of the ancient Near East. University of Pennsylvania Press, 2000. ISBN 0812235576.
- Peck, Malcolm C. Historical dictionary of the Gulf Arab states. Scarecrow Press, 2007. ISBN 9780810854.

===== Iran =====
- Bienkowski, Piotr, A. R. Millard. Dictionary of the ancient Near East. University of Pennsylvania Press, 2000. ISBN 0812235576.
- Coughlin, Kathryn M. Muslim cultures today: A reference guide. Greenwood Press, 2006. ISBN 0313323860.
- Embree, Ainslie Thomas, Asia Society. Encyclopedia of Asian history. Scribner; Collier Macmillan, 1988. ISBN 0684186195.
- Gunter, Michael M. Historical dictionary of the Kurds. Scarecrow Press, 2004. ISBN 0810848708.
- Leick, Gwendolyn. Historical dictionary of Mesopotamia. Scarecrow Press, 2003. ISBN 0810846497.
- Lorentz, John H. Historical dictionary of Iran. Scarecrow Press, 2007. ISBN 978-0-8108-5330-0.
- Mawṣililī, Ahmad. Historical dictionary of Islamic fundamentalist movements in the Arab world, Iran, and Turkey. Scarecrow Press, 1999. ISBN 0810836092.
- Yar-Shater, Ehsan. Encyclopædia Iranica. Columbia University Center for Iranian Studies, 2002. Available online here.

===== Iraq =====
- Bienkowski, Piotr, A. R. Millard. Dictionary of the ancient Near East. University of Pennsylvania Press, 2000. ISBN 0812235576.
- Coughlin, Kathryn M. Muslim cultures today: A reference guide. Greenwood Press, 2006. ISBN 0313323860.
- Ghareeb, Edmund, Beth Dougherty. Historical dictionary of Iraq. Scarecrow Press, 2004. ISBN 0810843307.
- Gunter, Michael M. Historical dictionary of the Kurds. Scarecrow Press, 2004. ISBN 0810848708.
- Leick, Gwendolyn. Historical dictionary of Mesopotamia. Scarecrow Press, 2003. ISBN 0810846497.

===== Israel =====
- Bienkowski, Piotr, A. R. Millard. Dictionary of the ancient Near East. University of Pennsylvania Press, 2000. ISBN 0812235576.
- Edelheit, Hershel, Abraham J. Edelheit. History of Zionism: A handbook and dictionary. Westview, [2000]. ISBN 0813329817.
- Kumaraswamy, P. R. Historical dictionary of the Arab-Israeli conflict. Scarecrow Press, 2006. ISBN 0810853434.
- Medoff, Rafael, Chaim Isaac Waxman. Historical dictionary of Zionism. Scarecrow Press, 2000. ISBN 0810837730.
- Reich, Bernard. Historical Dictionary of Israel. Scarecrow Press, 1992.
- Reich, Bernard, David Howard Goldberg, Historical dictionary of Israel. Scarecrow Press, 2008. ISBN 978-0-8108-5541-0.
- Wigoder, Geoffrey. New encyclopedia of Zionism and Israel. Fairleigh Dickinson University Press; Associated University Presses, 1994. ISBN 0838634338.

===== Jordan =====
- Bienkowski, Piotr, A. R. Millard. Dictionary of the ancient Near East. University of Pennsylvania Press, 2000. ISBN 0812235576.

===== Kuwait =====
- Bienkowski, Piotr, A. R. Millard. Dictionary of the ancient Near East. University of Pennsylvania Press, 2000. ISBN 0812235576.
- Leick, Gwendolyn. Historical dictionary of Mesopotamia. Scarecrow Press, 2003. ISBN 0810846497.
- Peck, Malcolm C. Historical dictionary of the Gulf Arab states. Scarecrow Press, 2007. ISBN 9780810854.

===== Lebanon =====
- AbuKhalil, Asʻad. Historical dictionary of Lebanon. Scarecrow Press, 1998. ISBN 0810833956.
- Bienkowski, Piotr, A. R. Millard. Dictionary of the ancient Near East. University of Pennsylvania Press, 2000. ISBN 0812235576.

===== Oman =====
- Bienkowski, Piotr, A. R. Millard. Dictionary of the ancient Near East. University of Pennsylvania Press, 2000. ISBN 0812235576.
- Peck, Malcolm C. Historical dictionary of the Gulf Arab states. Scarecrow Press, 2007. ISBN 9780810854.

===== Palestine =====
- Bienkowski, Piotr, A. R. Millard. Dictionary of the ancient Near East. University of Pennsylvania Press, 2000. ISBN 0812235576.
- Kumaraswamy, P. R. Historical dictionary of the Arab-Israeli conflict. Scarecrow Press, 2006. ISBN 0810853434.
- Mattar, Philip. Encyclopedia of the Palestinians. Facts on File, 2005. ISBN 0816057648.
- Nazzal, Nafez, Laila A. Nazzal. Historical dictionary of Palestine. Scarecrow Press, 1997. ISBN 0810832399.

===== Qatar =====
- Bienkowski, Piotr, A. R. Millard. Dictionary of the ancient Near East. University of Pennsylvania Press, 2000. ISBN 0812235576.
- Peck, Malcolm C. Historical dictionary of the Gulf Arab states. Scarecrow Press, 2007. ISBN 9780810854.

===== Saudi Arabia =====
- Bienkowski, Piotr, A. R. Millard. Dictionary of the ancient Near East. University of Pennsylvania Press, 2000. ISBN 0812235576.
- Coughlin, Kathryn M. Muslim cultures today: A reference guide. Greenwood Press, 2006. ISBN 0313323860.
- Peterson, John. Historical dictionary of Saudi Arabia. Scarecrow Press, 2003. ISBN 0810846772.

===== Syria =====
- Bienkowski, Piotr, A. R. Millard. Dictionary of the ancient Near East. University of Pennsylvania Press, 2000. ISBN 0812235576.
- Commins, David Dean. Historical dictionary of Syria. Scarecrow Press, 2004. ISBN 0810849348.
- Gunter, Michael M. Historical dictionary of the Kurds. Scarecrow Press, 2004. ISBN 0810848708.
- Leick, Gwendolyn. Historical dictionary of Mesopotamia. Scarecrow Press, 2003. ISBN 0810846497.

===== United Arab Emirates =====
- Bienkowski, Piotr, A. R. Millard. Dictionary of the ancient Near East. University of Pennsylvania Press, 2000. ISBN 0812235576.
- Peck, Malcolm C. Historical dictionary of the Gulf Arab states. Scarecrow Press, 2007. ISBN 9780810854.

===== Yemen =====
- Bienkowski, Piotr, A. R. Millard. Dictionary of the ancient Near East. University of Pennsylvania Press, 2000. ISBN 0812235576.
- Burrowes, Robert D. Historical dictionary of Yemen. Scarecrow Press, 1995. ISBN 0810829878.

=== Atlantic Ocean ===
==== Saint Helena, Ascension, and Tristan da Cunha ====
- Gascoigne, Bamber. Encyclopedia of Britain. Macmillan, 1993. ISBN 0028971426.

=== Europe ===
- Cook, Chris, Philip Broadhead. The Routledge companion to early modern Europe, 1453–1763. Routledge, 2006. ISBN 9780415409575.
- International encyclopaedia for the Middle Ages (IEMA): A supplement to LexMA-online. Brepols. Available online here.
- Koch, John T., Antone Minard. The Celts: history, life, and culture. ABC-CLIO, 2012. ISBN 9781598849646.
- Lexikon des Mittelalters online (LexMA). Brepols. Available online here. (German).
- Merriman, John M., J. M. Winter. Europe since 1914: Encyclopedia of the age of war and reconstruction. Charles Scribner's Sons/Thomson Gale, 2006. ISBN 0684313650.
- Olsen, James S. Historical Dictionary of European Imperialism. Greenwood, 1991.
- Roy, Joacquin, Aimee Kanner. Historical dictionary of the European Union. Scarecrow Press, 2006. ISBN 0810853140.
- Spector, Shmuel, Geoffrey Wigoder. The encyclopedia of Jewish life before and during the Holocaust. Yad Vashem; New York University Press, 2001. ISBN 0814793568.

==== Central Europe ====
- Webb, Adrian. The longman companion to Central and Eastern Europe since 1919. Longman, 2002. ISBN 0582437326.

===== Germany =====
- Jeep, John M. Medieval Germany: An encyclopedia. Garland, 2001. ISBN 0824076443.
- Sandford, John. Encyclopedia of contemporary German culture. Routledge, 1999. ISBN 0415124484.

===== Italy =====
- Coppa, Frank J. Dictionary of modern Italian history. Greenwood Press, 1985. ISBN 031322983X.

===== Liechtenstein =====
- Jeep, John M. Medieval Germany: An encyclopedia. Garland, 2001. ISBN 0824076443.

===== Switzerland =====
- Jeep, John M. Medieval Germany: An encyclopedia. Garland, 2001. ISBN 0824076443.
- Sandford, John. Encyclopedia of contemporary German culture. Routledge, 1999. ISBN 0415124484.
- Schelbert, Leo. Historical dictionary of Switzerland. Scarecrow Press, 2007. ISBN 978-0-8108-4931-0.

==== Eastern Europe ====
- Spector, Shmuel, Geoffrey Wigoder. The encyclopedia of Jewish life before and during the Holocaust. Yad Vashem; New York University Press, 2001. ISBN 0814793568.
- Webb, Adrian. The longman companion to Central and Eastern Europe since 1919. Longman, 2002. ISBN 0582437326.

===== Azerbaijan =====
- Bienkowski, Piotr, A. R. Millard. Dictionary of the ancient Near East. University of Pennsylvania Press, 2000. ISBN 0812235576.
- Swietochowski, Tadeusz, Brian C. Collins. Historical dictionary of Azerbaijan. Scarecrow Press, 1999. ISBN 0810835509.

===== Baltic states =====
====== Estonia ======
- Miljan, Toivo. Historical dictionary of Estonia. Scarecrow Press, 2004. ISBN 0810849046.

===== Croatia =====
- Frucht, Richard C. Encyclopedia of Eastern Europe: From the Congress of Vienna to the fall of communism. Garland Publishing, 2000. ISBN 0815300921.
- Roman, Eric. Austria-Hungary and the successor states: A reference guide from the Renaissance to the present. Facts On File, 2003. ISBN 0816045372.
- Šuster, Željan. Historical dictionary of the Federal Republic of Yugoslavia. Scarecrow Press, 1999. ISBN 0810834669.

===== Czech Republic =====
- Frucht, Richard C. Encyclopedia of Eastern Europe: From the Congress of Vienna to the fall of communism. Garland Publishing, 2000. ISBN 0815300921.
- Hochman, Jiri. Historical dictionary of the Czech State. Scarecrow Press, 1998. ISBN 0810833387.
- Roman, Eric. Austria-Hungary and the successor states: A reference guide from the Renaissance to the present. Facts On File, 2003. ISBN 0816045372.

===== Georgia =====
- Bienkowski, Piotr, A. R. Millard. Dictionary of the ancient Near East. University of Pennsylvania Press, 2000. ISBN 0812235576.
- Mikaberidze, Alexander. Historical dictionary of Georgia. Scarecrow Press, 2007. ISBN 978-0-8108-5580-9.

===== Hungary =====
- Frucht, Richard C. Encyclopedia of Eastern Europe: From the Congress of Vienna to the fall of communism. Garland Publishing, 2000. ISBN 0815300921.
- Roman, Eric. Austria-Hungary and the successor states: A reference guide from the Renaissance to the present. Facts On File, 2003. ISBN 0816045372.

===== Poland =====
- Dzieęgielewski, Jan. Encyklopedia historii Polski: Dzieje polityczne. Morex: Egross, 1994–1995. ISBN 839025221X.
- Frucht, Richard C. Encyclopedia of Eastern Europe: From the Congress of Vienna to the fall of communism. Garland Publishing, 2000. ISBN 0815300921.
- Gorzdecka-Sanford, Adriana. Historical dictionary of Warsaw. Scarecrow Press, 1997. ISBN 0810832992.

===== Romania =====
- Frucht, Richard C. Encyclopedia of Eastern Europe: From the Congress of Vienna to the fall of communism. Garland Publishing, 2000. ISBN 0815300921.

===== Russia =====
- Blackwell Encyclopedia of the Russian Revolution. Blackwell, 1988.
- Jackson, George & Robert Devlin. Dictionary of the Russian Revolution. Greenwood, 1989.
- Paxton, John. Encyclopedia of Russian History: From the Christianization of Kiev to the Breakup of the USSR. ABC-Clio, 1993.

===== Slovakia =====
- Frucht, Richard C. Encyclopedia of Eastern Europe: From the Congress of Vienna to the fall of communism. Garland Publishing, 2000. ISBN 0815300921.
- Roman, Eric. Austria-Hungary and the successor states: A reference guide from the Renaissance to the present. Facts On File, 2003. ISBN 0816045372.

===== Slovenia =====
- Frucht, Richard C. Encyclopedia of Eastern Europe: From the Congress of Vienna to the fall of communism. Garland Publishing, 2000. ISBN 0815300921.
- Roman, Eric. Austria-Hungary and the successor states: A reference guide from the Renaissance to the present. Facts On File, 2003. ISBN 0816045372.
- Šuster, Željan. Historical dictionary of the Federal Republic of Yugoslavia. Scarecrow Press, 1999. ISBN 0810834669.

===== Southeast Europe =====
- Somel, Selçuk Akşin. Historical dictionary of the Ottoman Empire. Scarecrow Press, 2003. ISBN 0810843323.

====== Albania ======
- Coughlin, Kathryn M. Muslim cultures today: A reference guide. Greenwood Press, 2006. ISBN 0313323860.
- Frucht, Richard C. Encyclopedia of Eastern Europe: From the Congress of Vienna to the fall of communism. Garland Publishing, 2000. ISBN 0815300921.

====== Bosnia and Herzegovina ======
- Coughlin, Kathryn M. Muslim cultures today: A reference guide. Greenwood Press, 2006. ISBN 0313323860.
- Frucht, Richard C. Encyclopedia of Eastern Europe: From the Congress of Vienna to the fall of communism. Garland Publishing, 2000. ISBN 0815300921.
- Roman, Eric. Austria-Hungary and the successor states: A reference guide from the Renaissance to the present. Facts On File, 2003. ISBN 0816045372.
- Šuster, Željan. Historical dictionary of the Federal Republic of Yugoslavia. Scarecrow Press, 1999. ISBN 0810834669.

====== Bulgaria ======
- Detrez, Raymond. Historical dictionary of Bulgaria. Scarecrow Press, 2006. ISBN 978-0-8108-4901-3.
- Kumanov, Milen, Kolinka Isova. Istoricheska entsiklopediia Bulgariia. Trud, 2003. ISBN 9545282029.
- Frucht, Richard C. Encyclopedia of Eastern Europe: From the Congress of Vienna to the fall of communism. Garland Publishing, 2000. ISBN 0815300921.

====== Cyprus ======
- Gascoigne, Bamber. Encyclopedia of Britain. Macmillan, 1993. ISBN 0028971426.

====== Macedonia ======
- Frucht, Richard C. Encyclopedia of Eastern Europe: From the Congress of Vienna to the fall of communism. Garland Publishing, 2000. ISBN 0815300921.
- Kiselinovski, Stojan, Institut za nacionalna istorija (Skopje, Macedonia). Makedonski istoriski recnik. Institut za nacionalna istorija, 2000. ISBN 9989624461.
- Roman, Eric. Austria-Hungary and the successor states: A reference guide from the Renaissance to the present. Facts On File, 2003. ISBN 0816045372.
- Šuster, Željan. Historical dictionary of the Federal Republic of Yugoslavia. Scarecrow Press, 1999. ISBN 0810834669.

====== Montenegro ======
- Frucht, Richard C. Encyclopedia of Eastern Europe: From the Congress of Vienna to the fall of communism. Garland Publishing, 2000. ISBN 0815300921.
- Roman, Eric. Austria-Hungary and the successor states: A reference guide from the Renaissance to the present. Facts On File, 2003. ISBN 0816045372.
- Šuster, Željan. Historical dictionary of the Federal Republic of Yugoslavia. Scarecrow Press, 1999. ISBN 0810834669.

====== Serbia ======
- Frucht, Richard C. Encyclopedia of Eastern Europe: From the Congress of Vienna to the fall of communism. Garland Publishing, 2000. ISBN 0815300921.
- Roman, Eric. Austria-Hungary and the successor states: A reference guide from the Renaissance to the present. Facts On File, 2003. ISBN 0816045372.
- Šuster, Željan. Historical dictionary of the Federal Republic of Yugoslavia. Scarecrow Press, 1999. ISBN 0810834669.

====== Turkey ======
- Bienkowski, Piotr, A. R. Millard. Dictionary of the ancient Near East. University of Pennsylvania Press, 2000. ISBN 0812235576.
- Coughlin, Kathryn M. Muslim cultures today: A reference guide. Greenwood Press, 2006. ISBN 0313323860.
- Gunter, Michael M. Historical dictionary of the Kurds. Scarecrow Press, 2004. ISBN 0810848708.
- Heper, Metin. Historical dictionary of Turkey. Scarecrow Press, 2002. ISBN 0810841339.
- Leick, Gwendolyn. Historical dictionary of Mesopotamia. Scarecrow Press, 2003. ISBN 0810846497.
- Mawṣililī, Ahmad. Historical dictionary of Islamic fundamentalist movements in the Arab world, Iran, and Turkey. Scarecrow Press, 1999. ISBN 0810836092.
- Sauer, Jutta. Türkisches biographisches archiv (TBA). K. G. Saur, 1999–2002. ISBN 3598342845.

==== Northern Europe ====
===== Finland =====
- Alho, Olli, Hildi Hawkins, Päivi Vallisaari Suomalaisen Kirjallisuuden Seura. Finland, a cultural encyclopedia. Finnish Literature Society, 1997. ISBN 9517178859.
- Hayes, Derek. Historical atlas of the Arctic. Douglas and McIntyre; University of Washington Press, 2003. ISBN 1553650042.
- Holland, Clive. Arctic exploration and development, c. 500 B.C. to 1915: An encyclopedia. Garland Publ., 1994. ISBN 0824076486.
- Mills, William J. Exploring polar frontiers: A historical encyclopedia. ABC-CLIO, 2003. ISBN 1576074226.
- Nuttall, Mark. Encyclopedia of the Arctic. Routledge, 2005. ISBN 1579584365.
- Pulsiano, Phillip, Kirsten Wolf, Paul Acker. Medieval Scandinavia: An encyclopedia. Garland, 1993. ISBN 0824047877.

===== Iceland =====
- Hálfdanarson, Guðmundur. Historical dictionary of Iceland. Scarecrow Press, 1997. ISBN 0810833522.
- Hayes, Derek. Historical atlas of the Arctic. Douglas and McIntyre; University of Washington Press, 2003. ISBN 1553650042.
- Holland, Clive. Arctic exploration and development, c. 500 B.C. to 1915: An encyclopedia. Garland Publ., 1994. ISBN 0824076486.
- Mills, William J. Exploring polar frontiers: A historical encyclopedia. ABC-CLIO, 2003. ISBN 1576074226.
- Nuttall, Mark. Encyclopedia of the Arctic. Routledge, 2005. ISBN 1579584365.
- Pulsiano, Phillip, Kirsten Wolf, Paul Acker. Medieval Scandinavia: An encyclopedia. Garland, 1993. ISBN 0824047877.

===== Ireland =====
- Ciment, James, Thaddeus Russell. The home front encyclopedia: United States, Britain, and Canada in World Wars I and II. ABC-CLIO, 2007. ISBN 978-1-57607-849-5.
- Donnelly, James S., Jr., Karl S. Bottigheimer. Encyclopedia of Irish history and culture. Macmillan Reference USA, 2004. ISBN 0028659023.
- Haigh, Christopher. The Cambridge Historical Encyclopedia of Great Britain and Ireland. Cambridge University Press, 1985.
- Jenkins, Ellen J. Eighteenth-Century British Historians. Thomson Gale, 2007. ISBN 9780787681548.
- Lalor, Brian, Frank McCourt. The encyclopedia of Ireland. Yale University Press, 2003. ISBN 0300094426.

===== Scandinavia =====
- Nordstrom, Byron J. Dictionary of Scandinavian History. Greenwood, 1986.
- Pulsiano, Phillip, Kirsten Wolf, Paul Acker. Medieval Scandinavia: An encyclopedia. Garland, 1993. ISBN 0824047877.

====== Denmark ======
- Pulsiano, Phillip, Kirsten Wolf, Paul Acker. Medieval Scandinavia: An encyclopedia. Garland, 1993. ISBN 0824047877.

====== Norway ======
- Hayes, Derek. Historical atlas of the Arctic. Douglas and McIntyre; University of Washington Press, 2003. ISBN 1553650042.
- Holland, Clive. Arctic exploration and development, c. 500 B.C. to 1915: An encyclopedia. Garland Publ., 1994. ISBN 0824076486.
- Mills, William J. Exploring polar frontiers: A historical encyclopedia. ABC-CLIO, 2003. ISBN 1576074226.
- Nuttall, Mark. Encyclopedia of the Arctic. Routledge, 2005. ISBN 1579584365.
- Pulsiano, Phillip, Kirsten Wolf, Paul Acker. Medieval Scandinavia: An encyclopedia. Garland, 1993. ISBN 0824047877.
- Sjåvik, Jan. Historical dictionary of Norway. Scarecrow Press, 2008. ISBN 978-0-8108-5753-7.

====== Sweden ======
- Hayes, Derek. Historical atlas of the Arctic. Douglas and McIntyre; University of Washington Press, 2003. ISBN 1553650042.
- Holland, Clive. Arctic exploration and development, c. 500 B.C. to 1915: An encyclopedia. Garland Publ., 1994. ISBN 0824076486.
- Mills, William J. Exploring polar frontiers: A historical encyclopedia. ABC-CLIO, 2003. ISBN 1576074226.
- Nuttall, Mark. Encyclopedia of the Arctic. Routledge, 2005. ISBN 1579584365.
- Pulsiano, Phillip, Kirsten Wolf, Paul Acker. Medieval Scandinavia: An encyclopedia. Garland, 1993. ISBN 0824047877.
- Scobbie, Irene. Historical dictionary of Sweden. Scarecrow Press, 2006. ISBN 9780810853751.

===== United Kingdom =====
- Alexander, Marc. A companion to the royal heritage of Britain. Sutton, 2005. ISBN 0750932686; ISBN 9780750932684.
- Cannon, John Ashton. The Oxford companion to British history. Oxford University Press, 2002.
- Ciment, James, Thaddeus Russell. The home front encyclopedia: United States, Britain, and Canada in World Wars I and II. ABC-CLIO, 2007. ISBN 978-1-57607-849-5.
- Cook, Chris. The Routledge companion to Britain in the nineteenth century, 1815–1914. Routledge, 2005. ISBN 0415359694.
- Cook, Chris, John Stevenson. The Longman companion to Britain since 1945. Longman, 2000. ISBN 0582356741.
- Dabydeen, David, John Gilmore, Cecily Jones. The Oxford companion to Black British history. Oxford University Press, 2007. ISBN 9780192804396.
- Gascoigne, Bamber. Encyclopedia of Britain. Macmillan, 1993. ISBN 0028971426.
- Haigh, Christopher. The Cambridge Historical Encyclopedia of Great Britain and Ireland. Cambridge University Press, 1985.
- Jenkins, Ellen J. Eighteenth-Century British Historians. Thomson Gale, 2007. ISBN 9780787681548.
- Newman, Gerald, Leslie Ellen Brown. Britain in the Hanoverian age, 1714–1837: An encyclopedia. Garland Publishing, 1997. ISBN 0815303963.
- Richardson, John, Brian Christmas. The local historian's encyclopedia. Historical Publications, 2003. ISBN 0948667834.
- Wagner, J. A. Encyclopedia of the Wars of the Roses. ABC-CLIO, 2001. ISBN 1851093583.

====== England ======
- Fritze, Ronald H., William B. Robison. Historical dictionary of late medieval England, 1272–1485. Greenwood Press, c2002. ISBN 0313291241.
- Griffiths, Dennis. The encyclopedia of the British press, 1422–1992. St. Martin's Press, 1992. ISBN 0312086334.
- Kinney, Arthur F., David W. Swain, Eugene D. Hill. Tudor England: An encyclopedia. Garland, 2001.
- Ollard, S. L., Gordon Crosse, Maurice Francis Bond. A dictionary of English church history. A.R. Mowbray; Morehouse-Gorham, [1948].
- Watts, V. E., John Insley, Margaret Gelling. The Cambridge dictionary of English place-names: Based on the collections of the English Place-Name Society. Cambridge University Press, 2004. ISBN 0521362091.

====== Northern Ireland ======
- Donnelly, James S., Jr., Karl S. Bottigheimer. Encyclopedia of Irish history and culture. Macmillan Reference USA, 2004. ISBN 0028659023.
- Lalor, Brian, Frank McCourt. The encyclopedia of Ireland. Yale University Press, 2003. ISBN 0300094426.

====== Scotland ======
- Donnachie, Ian, George Hewitt. Collins dictionary of Scottish history. HarperCollins, 2001. ISBN 0007121857.
- Mullay, Sandy. The Edinburgh Encyclopædia. Mainstream, 1996.

==== Southern Europe ====
===== Southcentral Europe =====
====== Italy ======
- Cancik, Hubert, Helmuth Schneider, Christine F. Salazar, David E. Orton. Brill's New Pauly: Encyclopaedia of the ancient world. Brill, 2002–. ISBN 9004122591.
- Dall'Acqua, Marzio. Enciclopedia di Parma: Dalle origini ai giorni nostri. F.M. Ricci, 1998. ISBN 8821609448.
- Grant, Michael and Rachel Kitzinger. Civilization of the Ancient Mediterranean: Greece and Rome. Scribner's, 1988.
- Historical Dictionary of Fascist Italy. Greenwood, 1982.
- Nash, Ernest, Deutsches Archäologisches Institut. Pictorial dictionary of ancient Rome. Thames and Hudson, 1968.
- Oxford Classical Dictionary. Oxford University Press, 1970.
- Sandys, John Edwin. A companion to Latin studies. University Press, 1929 [1921].
- Sarti, Roland. Italy: A reference guide from the Renaissance to the present. Facts On File, 2004. ISBN 0816045224.
- Secchia, Pietro, Enzo Nizza. Enciclopedia dell'antifascismo e della Resistenza. La Pietra [Walk Over], 1968–1989.
- Speake, Graham. Encyclopedia of Greece and the Hellenic tradition. Fitzroy Dearborn, 2000.

===== Southeastern Europe =====
====== Cyprus ======
- Bienkowski, Piotr, A. R. Millard. Dictionary of the ancient Near East. University of Pennsylvania Press, 2000. ISBN 0812235576.
- Gascoigne, Bamber. Encyclopedia of Britain. Macmillan, 1993. ISBN 0028971426.
- Panteli, Stavros. Historical dictionary of Cyprus. Scarecrow Press, 1994. ISBN 0810829126.

====== Greece ======
- Cancik, Hubert, Helmuth Schneider, Christine F. Salazar, David E. Orton. Brill's New Pauly: Encyclopaedia of the ancient world. Brill, 2002–. ISBN 9004122591.
- Grant, Michael and Rachel Kitzinger. Civilization of the Ancient Mediterranean: Greece and Rome. Scribner's, 1988.
- Hazel, John. Who's who in the Greek world. Routledge, 2000. ISBN 0415124972.
- Oxford Classical Dictionary. Oxford University Press, 1970.
- Speake, Graham. Encyclopedia of Greece and the Hellenic tradition. Fitzroy Dearborn, 2000.
- Traulos, Iōannēs N., Deutsches Archäologisches Institut. Pictorial dictionary of ancient Athens. Thames and Hudson, 1971. ISBN 0500050120.
- Whibley, Leonard. A companion to Greek studies. The University Press, 1931.

====== Kosovo ======
- Frucht, Richard C. Encyclopedia of Eastern Europe: From the Congress of Vienna to the fall of communism. Garland Publishing, 2000. ISBN 0815300921.
- Roman, Eric. Austria-Hungary and the successor states: A reference guide from the Renaissance to the present. Facts On File, 2003. ISBN 0816045372.
- Šuster, Željan. Historical dictionary of the Federal Republic of Yugoslavia. Scarecrow Press, 1999. ISBN 0810834669.

====== Malta ======
- Berg, Warren G. Historical dictionary of Malta. Scarecrow Press, 1995. ISBN 0810830183.
- Gascoigne, Bamber. Encyclopedia of Britain. Macmillan, 1993. ISBN 0028971426.

===== Southwestern Europe =====
- Gerli, E. Michael, Samuel G. Armistead. Medieval Iberia: An encyclopedia. Routledge, 2003. ISBN 0415939186.

====== Gibraltar ======
- Gascoigne, Bamber. Encyclopedia of Britain. Macmillan, 1993. ISBN 0028971426.

====== Portugal ======
- Santana, Francisco, Eduardo Sucena. Dicionário da história de Lisboa. C. Quintas, 1994. ISBN 9729603006.
- Serrão, Joel. Dicionário de história de Portugal. Iniciativas Editoriais, [1975–].

====== Spain ======
- Beede, Benjamin R. The War of 1898 and U.S. interventions, 1898–1934: An encyclopedia. Garland, 1994. ISBN 0824056248.
- Cortada, James W. Historical dictionary of the Spanish Civil War, 1936–1939. Greenwood Press, 1982. ISBN 0313220549.
- Historical Dictionary of Modern Spain, 1700-1988. Greenwood, 1990.
- Historical Dictionary of the Spanish Empire, 1402-1975. Greenwood, 1991.
- Rodgers, E. J., Valerie Rodgers. Encyclopedia of contemporary Spanish culture. Routledge, 1999. ISBN 0415131871.
- Tucker, Spencer D., James Arnold, Roberta Wiener, Paul G. Pierpaoli, Jack McCallum, Justin D. Murphy. The encyclopedia of the Spanish-American and Philippine-American wars: A political, social, and military history. ABC-CLIO, 2009. ISBN 9781851099511.

==== Western Europe ====
===== Austria =====
- Austria from A to Z. Graz Technical University. Available online here.
- Jeep, John M. Medieval Germany: An encyclopedia. Garland, 2001. ISBN 0824076443.
- Roman, Eric. Austria-Hungary and the successor states: A reference guide from the Renaissance to the present. Facts On File, 2003. ISBN 0816045372.
- Sandford, John. Encyclopedia of contemporary German culture. Routledge, 1999. ISBN 0415124484.

===== Belgium =====
- Jeep, John M. Medieval Germany: An encyclopedia. Garland, 2001. ISBN 0824076443.
- State, Paul F. Historical dictionary of Brussels. Scarecrow Press, 2004. ISBN 0810850753.

===== France =====
- Antony, Bernard. Dictionnaire de la réplique. Godefroy de Bouillon, [2004].
- Fremont-Barnes, Gregory. The encyclopedia of the French revolutionary and Napoleonic Wars: A political, social, and military history. ABC-CLIO, 2006. ISBN 1851096469; ISBN 978-1-85109-646-6.
- Furet, François and Mona Ozouf. A Critical Dictionary of the French Revolution. Harvard University Press, 1989.
- Historical Dictionary of France from the 1815 Restoration to the Second Empire. Greenwood, 1987.
- Historical Dictionary of Napoleonic France, 1799-1815. Greenwood, 1985.
- Historical Dictionary of the French Second Empire, 1852-1879. Greenwood, 1985.
- Historical Dictionary of the Third French Republic, 1870-1940. Greenwood, 1986.
- Historical Dictionary of the Fourth, Fifth and Sixth Republics, 1946-1991. Greenwood, 1992.
- Jouanna, Arlette. Histoire et dictionnaire des guerres de religion. R. Laffont, 1998. ISBN 2221074254.
- Northcutt, Wayne. Historical dictionary of the French Fourth and Fifth Republics, 1946–1991. Greenwood Press, 1992. ISBN 0313263566.
- Paxton, John. Companion to the French Revolution. Facts on File, 1988.
- Pope, Stephen. Dictionary of the Napoleonic wars. Facts on File, 1999. ISBN 0816042438.
- Roberts, William J. France: A reference guide from the Renaissance to the present. Facts On File, 2004. ISBN 0816044732.
- Scott, Samuel F. and Barry Rothaus. Historical Dictionary of the French Revolution 1789-1799. Greenwood, 1985. ISBN 0313211418.
- Sellier, Jean, Anne. Le Fur, Bertrand de Brun. Atlas historique des provinces et régions de France: Genèse d'un peuple. La Découverte, 1997. ISBN 2707127515.
- Sirinelli, Jean-François, Daniel Couty. Dictionnaire de l'histoire de France. A. Colin, 1999. ISBN 2035050855.
- Suratteau, Jean-René, Francis Gendron, Jean Paul Bertaud. Dictionnaire historique de la Révolution française. Presses universitaires de France, 1989. ISBN 2130425224.

===== Germany =====
- Epstein, Eric Joseph, Philip Rosen, Henry R. Huttenbach. Dictionary of the Holocaust: Biography, geography, and terminology. Greenwood Press, 1997. ISBN 031330355X.
- Gutman, Israel. Encyclopedia of the Holocaust. Macmillan, 1990.
- Jeep, John M. Medieval Germany: An encyclopedia. Garland, 2001. ISBN 0824076443.
- Sandford, John. Encyclopedia of contemporary German culture. Routledge, 1999. ISBN 0415124484.
- Taddey, Gerhard. Lexikon der deutschen Geschichte: Ereignisse, Institutionen, Personen: von den Anfängen bis zur Kapitulation 1945. Kröner, 1998. ISBN 3520813033; ISBN 9783520813039.
- Vincent, C. Paul, Harry Ritter. A historical dictionary of Germany's Weimar Republic, 1918–1933. Greenwood Press, 1997. ISBN 0313273766.
- Zentner, Christian and Friedemann Bedurftig. Encyclopedia of the Third Reich. Macmillan, 1991.

===== Luxembourg =====
- Barteau, Harry C. Historical dictionary of Luxembourg. Scarecrow Press, 1996. ISBN 0810831066.

===== Netherlands =====
- Jeep, John M. Medieval Germany: An encyclopedia. Garland, 2001. ISBN 0824076443.
- Koopmans, Joop W., A. H. Huussen. Historical dictionary of the Netherlands. Scarecrow Press, 2007. ISBN 978-0-8108-5627-1.

==== Byzantium ====
- Kazhdan, Alexander B. The Oxford Dictionary of Byzantium. Oxford University Press, 1991.

=== Oceania ===
- Craig, Robert D., Frank P. King. Historical dictionary of Oceania. Greenwood Press, 1981. ISBN 0313210608.
- Lal, Brij V., Kate Fortune. The Pacific Islands: An encyclopedia. University of Hawai'i Press, 2000. ISBN 082482265X.
- West, Barbara A. Encyclopedia of the peoples of Asia and Oceania. Facts On File, 2009. ISBN 9780816071098.

==== Australia ====
- The Australian encyclopaedia. Australian Geographic Society, 1996. ISBN 1862760144.
- Bassett, Jan. Oxford Dictionary of Australian History. Oxford University Press, 1986.
- Docherty, James. Historical Dictionary of Australia. Scarecrow Press, 1993.
- Gascoigne, Bamber. Encyclopedia of Britain. Macmillan, 1993. ISBN 0028971426.
- Gilbert, Alan D. Australians: A Historical Library. Cambridge University Press, 1988.

==== Melanesia ====
===== Fiji =====
- Gascoigne, Bamber. Encyclopedia of Britain. Macmillan, 1993. ISBN 0028971426.

===== New Caledonia =====
- Sellier, Jean, Anne. Le Fur, Bertrand de Brun. Atlas historique des provinces et régions de France: Genèse d'un peuple. La Découverte, 1997. ISBN 2707127515.

===== Papua New Guinea =====
- Gascoigne, Bamber. Encyclopedia of Britain. Macmillan, 1993. ISBN 0028971426.

===== Solomon Islands =====
- Gascoigne, Bamber. Encyclopedia of Britain. Macmillan, 1993. ISBN 0028971426.

===== Vanuatu =====
- Gascoigne, Bamber. Encyclopedia of Britain. Macmillan, 1993. ISBN 0028971426.

==== Micronesia ====
- Wuerch, William L., Dirk Anthony Ballendorf. Historical dictionary of Guam and Micronesia. Scarecrow Press, 1994. ISBN 0810828588.

===== Guam =====
- Wuerch, William L., Dirk Anthony Ballendorf. Historical dictionary of Guam and Micronesia. Scarecrow Press, 1994. ISBN 0810828588.

===== Kiribati =====
- Gascoigne, Bamber. Encyclopedia of Britain. Macmillan, 1993. ISBN 0028971426.

===== Nauru =====
- Gascoigne, Bamber. Encyclopedia of Britain. Macmillan, 1993. ISBN 0028971426.

==== Polynesia ====
- Craig, Robert D. Historical dictionary of Polynesia. Scarecrow Press, 2002. ISBN 0810842378.
- Historical Dictionary of Polynesia. Scarecrow Press, 2011. ISBN 9780810867727.

===== Cook Islands =====
- Craig, Robert D. Historical dictionary of Polynesia. Scarecrow Press, 2002. ISBN 0810842378.

===== Easter Island =====
- Craig, Robert D. Historical dictionary of Polynesia. Scarecrow Press, 2002. ISBN 0810842378.

===== French Polynesia =====
- Craig, Robert D. Historical dictionary of Polynesia. Scarecrow Press, 2002. ISBN 0810842378.
- Sellier, Jean, Anne. Le Fur, Bertrand de Brun. Atlas historique des provinces et régions de France: Genèse d'un peuple. La Découverte, 1997. ISBN 2707127515.

====== Tahiti ======
- O'Reilly, Patrick, Raoul Teissier, J. Boullaire. Tahitiens: Répertoire biographique de la Polynésie française. Musée de l'homme, 1975. (French)

===== Hawaii =====
- Craig, Robert D. Historical dictionary of Polynesia. Scarecrow Press, 2002. ISBN 0810842378.

===== New Zealand =====
- Bateman New Zealand encyclopedia. David Bateman Ltd., 2005. ISBN 1869536010.
- Craig, Robert D. Historical dictionary of Polynesia. Scarecrow Press, 2002. ISBN 0810842378.
- Gascoigne, Bamber. Encyclopedia of Britain. Macmillan, 1993. ISBN 0028971426.
- Te Ara--The Encyclopedia of New Zealand. Manatu Taonga Ministry for Culture and Heritage, 2005-. Available online here.

===== Niue =====
- Craig, Robert D. Historical dictionary of Polynesia. Scarecrow Press, 2002. ISBN 0810842378.

===== Pitcairn Islands =====
- Craig, Robert D. Historical dictionary of Polynesia. Scarecrow Press, 2002. ISBN 0810842378.
- Gascoigne, Bamber. Encyclopedia of Britain. Macmillan, 1993. ISBN 0028971426.

===== Samoa =====
- Craig, Robert D. Historical dictionary of Polynesia. Scarecrow Press, 2002. ISBN 0810842378.
- Gascoigne, Bamber. Encyclopedia of Britain. Macmillan, 1993. ISBN 0028971426.

===== Tokelau =====
- Craig, Robert D. Historical dictionary of Polynesia. Scarecrow Press, 2002. ISBN 0810842378.

===== Tonga =====
- Craig, Robert D. Historical dictionary of Polynesia. Scarecrow Press, 2002. ISBN 0810842378.
- Gascoigne, Bamber. Encyclopedia of Britain. Macmillan, 1993. ISBN 0028971426.

===== Tuvalu =====
- Craig, Robert D. Historical dictionary of Polynesia. Scarecrow Press, 2002. ISBN 0810842378.
- Gascoigne, Bamber. Encyclopedia of Britain. Macmillan, 1993. ISBN 0028971426.

===== Wallis and Futuna =====
- Craig, Robert D. Historical dictionary of Polynesia. Scarecrow Press, 2002. ISBN 0810842378.
- Sellier, Jean, Anne. Le Fur, Bertrand de Brun. Atlas historique des provinces et régions de France: Genèse d'un peuple. La Découverte, 1997. ISBN 2707127515.

== Today in history ==
- Denney, Robert E., Gregory J. W. Urwin. The Civil War years: A day-by-day chronicle of the life of a nation. Sterling, 1992. ISBN 0806985194.
- Gutierrez, Pedro Rafael. Calendario historico: 500 anos de historia de Costa Rica. Universidad Autonoma de Centro America, 1988. ISBN 9977630526.
- Johnson, David E. From day to day: A calendar of notable birthdays and events. Scarecrow Press, 2001. ISBN 081083944X.
- Marsh, W. B., Bruce Carrick. 365: Your date with history. Icon, 2004. ISBN 1840466065.

== See also ==
- Bibliography of encyclopedias
