= Der Große Ploetz =

German encyclopedia

Der Große Ploetz is a German encyclopedia of world history and a standard historical reference book. It is a collection of historical data and information, organized in a chronological and geographical fashion. It is often described as the most important German-language historical reference book.

== History ==
The first edition was published in 1863 by Karl Julius Ploetz, with the title Auszug der alten, mittleren und neueren Geschichte als Leitfaden und Repetitionen veröffentlichten Werk. His son, Alfred Georg Ploetz founded the company A. G. Ploetz Verlag in 1880 in Berlin and bought the distribution rights from Herbig Verlag. After the Second World War, the company moved to Bielefeld and then to Würzburg. In 1972 it was finally sold to Herder Verlag.

By the 20th century the book had already earned a high reputation among historians. The completely revised 29th edition, published in 1980, was contributed to by 65 historians. The name was changed to Der Große Ploetz - Auszug aus der Geschichte.

During its history, many notable historians have contributed to the book, including Friedrich Prinz, Werner Conze, and Andreas Hillgruber.

== Current edition ==
The 35th and current edition was published in 2008 by Vandenhoeck & Ruprecht. It has 2128 pages and weighs 2.805 kilograms. The text was revised in this edition and the appearance of the book was redesigned. The German newspaper Die Welt wrote of the new revision, The Ploetz has reconquered its position as the most important historical reference book and, due to its new appearance, is able to compete with Wikipedia.
