= Conspiracy Encyclopedia =

Nonfiction book by Thom Burnett

- Book cover
- Author: Thom Burnett (introduction)
- Language: English
- Subject: Conspiracy theories
- Genre: Encyclopedia
- Publisher: Chamberlain Bros.
- Publication date: 2005
- Publication place: United States
- Pages: 320
- ISBN: 1-59609-156-8
- OCLC: 62162975

Conspiracy Encyclopedia: The Encyclopedia of Conspiracy Theories is a non-fiction reference book about conspiracy theories, with an introduction by editor Thom Burnett. It was published in 2005 by Chamberlain Bros., and in 2006 by Collins & Brown. Contributors to the work include Thom Burnett, Nigel Cawthorne, Richard Emerson, Mick Farren, Alex Games, John Gill, Sandy Gort, Rod Green, Emma Hooley, Esther Selsdon, and Kenn Thomas. The encyclopedia discusses 365 conspiracy theories, most of which are political.

The encyclopedia was positively reviewed in The Guardian, where it was referred to as a "beautifully-produced tome". It received both a positive and a negative review from two different writers in The Times. In 2008 the encyclopedia was listed as required reading in a course on conspiracy at Harvard University.

== Background ==
Burnett has written other works on international politics, including Who Really Won the Space Race?: Uncovering the Conspiracy That Kept America Second to the Russians (2005), and Who Really Runs the World?: The War between Globalization and Democracy (2007). The name Thom Burnett is a pen name for someone who first garnered security experience while a member of United Kingdom Special Forces. After his military service, he became a writer and pursued postgraduate education in Britain in conspiracy theories.

== Contents ==
Thom Burnett begins the encyclopedia by introducing the reader to the contents and concepts in the work. Burnett notes that the German term Verschwörungsmythos means "Conspiracy Myth", and has value as a descriptive label. "Perhaps the conspiracy world is an updated version of ancient myths, where monsters and the gods of Olympus and Valhalla have been replaced by aliens and the Illuminati of Washington and Buckingham Palace," writes Burnett. Three hundred and sixty-five conspiracy theories are discussed in the work, the majority of which are political in nature. It contains many pictures to illustrate the points it makes. Topics discussed include the Moon landing conspiracy theories, the Bilderberg Group, the Illuminati, the Warren Commission and the Kennedy assassination conspiracy theories, the views of David Icke, and chupacabras. The encyclopedia has a section on assassinations, and those discussed include the deaths of Kenneth Bigley in 2004, Danny Casolaro in 1991, John F. Kennedy in 1963, and Tutankhamun in 1323 BC.

== Reception and legacy ==
The Bookseller called the book "the first comprehensive encyclopedia of its kind". In a review of the encyclopedia for The Guardian, Andrew Mueller called it a "beautifully-produced tome" and commented that the work "succeeds, as was probably intentional, in offering some fascinating tours of the byways of history and providing a tantalising alternative universe in which much of what you know may not be what it seems". John Cooper reviewed the encyclopedia for The Times, and described it as "an entertaining compilation of ideas ranging from who was the 'real William Shakespeare' to the BCCI case and al-Qaeda". Cooper noted, "The most fascinating section relates to 'Assassinations' ... an unusual fairytale book for Christmas." Martin Samuel gave a more critical review of the encyclopedia for The Times, commenting, "For all the encyclopedia's pretence at sifting the evidence in search of a verdict, if the truth is out there, the authors are damned if they can find it."

Conspiracy Encyclopedia was listed as required reading in a 2008 course on conspiracy at Harvard University. Writing in Conspiracy Theories & Secret Societies For Dummies, authors Christopher Hodapp and Alice Von Kannon comment that Burnett asserts "the spirit of our times has had the crap kicked out of it by global domination". The encyclopedia is recommended for further reading by David Southwell and Sean Twist in their book Unsolved Political Mysteries. Writing for The Star, James Mitchell observed, "There's a huge amount packed in here, simply presented." Mitchell concluded, "Read the Conspiracy Encyclopedia, and you'll either have your worst fears confirmed that there's a grand, unified conspiracy affecting everything ... or less exciting, that most of the time, vanilla rules: What you see is what you get!"

== Editions ==
- Conspiracy Encyclopedia: The Encyclopedia of Conspiracy Theories. London: Conspiracy Books (Collins & Brown). 2005. Internet Archive. ISBN 978-1-84340-287-9.

== See also ==
- Cabal
- Conspiracy (crime)
- List of conspiracy theories
