= Leonard Latkovski Jr. =

Latvian-American professor of philosophy

Leonard Latkovski, Jr.
- Born: Leonards Latkovskis; June 6, 1943; Kārsava, Latgale, Latvia
- Died: June 13, 2015 (aged 72); Frederick, Maryland
- Other name: Len
- Citizenship: American
- Occupation: Professor of History
- Years active: 1969-2015
- Spouse: Patricia Hannigan
- Children: four
- Parent(s): Leonard Latkovski Sr., Albīna Putāns

Academic background
- Education: Bellarmine College
- Alma mater: Georgetown University
- Thesis: (1973)

Academic work
- Discipline: Eastern European History, Baltic History, Russian History
- Sub-discipline: Latvia, Latgale
- Institutions: Hood College
- Website: https://lenlatkovski.com

Leonard Latkovski Jr. (Latvian: Leonards Latkovskis jaunākais, 1943–2015) was a Latvian American professor of history and international studies at Hood College, who championed Eastern European studies, particularly those of his ethnic origin in Latgale, Latvia.

== Background ==
Leonard Latkovski Jr., was born on June 9, 1943, in Kārsava, Latgale, Latvia. His Catholic parents were Leonard Latkovski Sr. (Latvian: Leonards Latkovskis seniors), and Albīna Putāns. (Latkovski Sr. was a professor of classics at Bellarmine College.) He had eight siblings. In 1944, his family fled from the advancing Soviet army from Latvia to Germany, where they lived in refugee camps until they emigrated to the United States in 1950 and settled in Louisville, Kentucky. In 1961, Latkovski graduated from Louisville St. Xavier High School. In 1964, he received a BA in history from Bellarmine College (and served as president of its student body). At Georgetown University, he earned an MA in Russia and Eastern European history in 1967 and doctorate in Russian History in 1973.

== Career ==
In 1969, Latkovski joined Hood College and taught History and Political Science there for more than 45 years–until his death in 2015. For some years, he was the Chair of the History and Political Science Department. He also coached the college's tennis team.

Latkovski led groups of students on trips to the Baltic countries and Russia. As a Catholic, he used these tours during the Soviet era to monitor religious persecution, to interview priests and citizens, and reported to the Vatican, including personally to Pope John Paul II. As an historian, "he placed a critical spotlight on deportations and inhuman conditions in Soviet gulags, having interviewed dozens of survivors."

Latkovski was a frequent commentator on current politics in US media, including National Public Radio, newspapers, and local television. He also appeared in Russian and Latvian media. Near the time of his death, he was working on a project entitled "The History of the Catholic Church in Latvia."

== Personal life and death ==
In 1967, Latkovski married Patricia Hannigan; they had four children.

As a former refugee, Latkovski championed the disenfranchised including the poor, mentally ill, and oppressed. He tutored and often housed new immigrants and advocated for civil rights. Soviet Gulag interviewees included the daughter of his own aunt after 14 years of imprisonment for religious and democracy efforts.

After discovering the spelling of his first name as Leonhards ("Lion Hearted"), he began to adopt use of that name over "Leonard". He died on June 13, 2015, in Frederick, Maryland.

== Legacy ==
Latkovski was director of the Latgale Renaissance Fund and founded the Latgale Research Center and the Gulag Research Press. He provided "trunk loads" of medicine and necessities on his trips to Latvia.

Known in his native Latgale for his teachings and dedication to the region, Latkovski was once honored with a biographical exhibit at the Central Rēzekne Library.

In October 2015, Hood College announced the Dr. Leonard Latkovski Memorial Prize in History, originally established in 2009 and renamed in 2015 for Latkovski's "outstanding achievement in history."

== Works ==
- Dreaded Island: The History of Novaya Zemlya (1968) with Michael W. Adler
- Dictionary of Historic Documents (1990) (introduction)
- Aglona: History of the Church and Monastery (2009). Latgalian Culture Centre, Rezekne.
- Baltic Prisoners in the Gulag Revolts of 1953, part I. Lituanus, 51(3), p. 4-39.
- Baltic Prisoners in the Gulag Revolts of 1953, part II. Lituanus,51(4), p. 5-30.

== External sources ==
- lenlatkovski.com
- Latgale Research Center
