= Bibliography of Bengaluru =

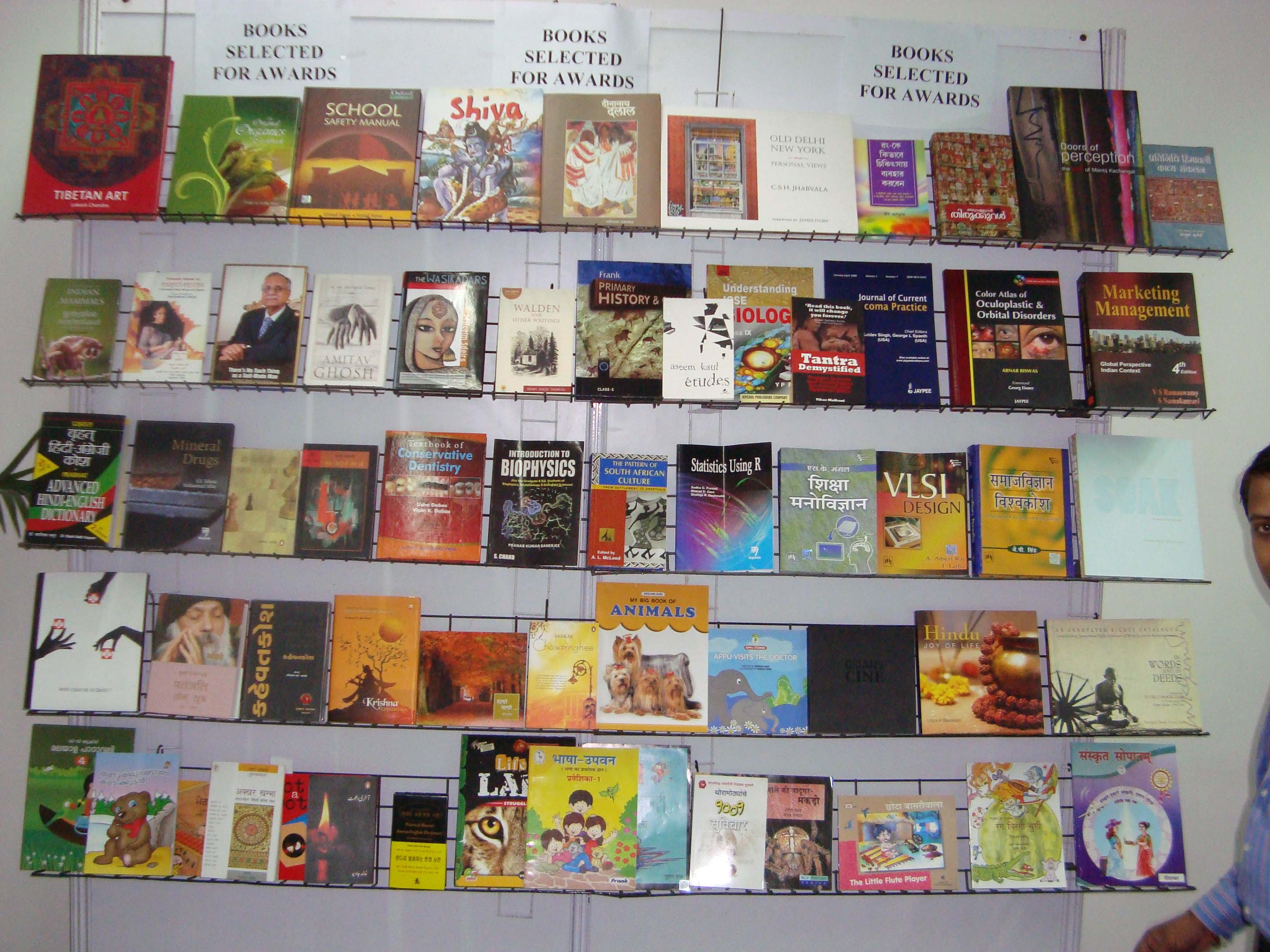
A book-stand in Bangalore

This is a bibliography of Bengaluru, India. It includes books about the city, its history, culture, geography, and its people. Many books have been written on the city. Some of the most notable books are Bengaluru: The Comprehensive History to the Dawn of Independence, The Red Carpet (2005) by Lavanya Sankaran, Bangalored: The Expat Story (2006) by Eshwar Sundaresan, Multiple City: Writings on Bangalore (2008) by Aditi De etc. Other than the books written on Bangalore, there are fictions such as Riddle of the Seventh Stone (2010) by Monideepa Sahu, The Lilac House: A Novel (2012) by Anita Nair, The Lost Girl (2012) by Sangu Mandanna etc. which are set in the city.

== A-N ==
Book	Author/Editor	Publisher	ISBN	Ref
A Bangalore Diary	Ajay Bhaskar	Leadstart Publishing	ISBN 978-93-82473-75-6	
Assimilation: A Study of North Indians in Bangalore	Vijaya Bhaskar Punekar	Popular Prakashan	ISBN 978-81-7154-012-9	
Bangalore	Kerry James Evans	Consortium Book Sales & Dist	ISBN 978-1-55659-405-2	
Bangalore - A Century of Tales from City Cantonment	Peter Colaco	Via Media Books		
Bangalore: An Expat Survival Guide		Chillibreeze		
Bangalore and Karnataka	Rajita Gadagkar	Infinitum Pub.	ISBN 978-81-902505-0-4	
Bangalore Baloney	Thomas Itty	iMad Services	ISBN 978-0-9910587-0-9	
Bangalore Blue	Terry Kennedy	Split Shift	ISBN 978-0-9655547-3-2	
Bangalore Calling	Brinda Sekhar Narayan	Little, Brown Book Group Limited	ISBN 978-93-5009-219-4	
Bangalore Chronicles: A Kidnap	Vinay Ramakrishna	Notion Press	ISBN 978-93-5206-297-3	
Bangalore - Mysore	A. Raman	Orient Blackswan	ISBN 978-0-86311-431-1	
Bangalored, the Expat Story	Eshwar Sundaresan	East West Books (Madras)	ISBN 978-81-88661-44-2	
Bangalore: the story of a city	Maya Jayapal	Eastwest Books (Madras)	ISBN 978-81-86852-09-5	
Bengaluru: The Comprehensive History to the Dawn of Independence	Ramjee Chandran	Penguin Viking	ISBN 978-9377303785	
Bombay to Bangalore	Sudha Murthy	Penguin Books Limited	ISBN 978-93-5118-052-4	
Building Bangalore: Architecture and urban transformation in India’s Silicon Valley	John C. Stallmeyer	Routledge	ISBN 978-1-136-90397-7	
From Bangalore to Brooklyn	Primedia E-launch LLC		ISBN 978-1-62209-013-6	
My Days in the Underworld: Rise of the Bangalore Mafia	Agni Sreedhar	Westland	ISBN 978-93-83260-34-8	
Bangalore through the Centuries	M. Fazlul Hasan	Historical Publications (Bangalore)		

== O-Z ==
Book	Author/Editor	Publisher	ISBN	Ref
Multiple City: Writings on Bangalore	Aditi De	Penguin Books India	ISBN 978-0-14-310025-6	
Old Bungalows in Bangalore, South India	Janet Pott, Elizabeth Staley, Romola Chatterjee	Pott		
Our Bangalore: A Journey Through Time	N. Jagadeesh	Sapna Book House		
The Promise of the Metropolis: Bangalore's Twentieth Century	Janaki Nair	Oxford University Press	ISBN 978-0-19-566725-7	
The Red Carpet	Lavanya Sankaran			
The Devadasi and the Saint: The Life and Times of Bangalore Nagarathnamma	V. Sriram	East West Books (Madras)	ISBN 978-81-88661-70-1	

== See also ==
- Bibliography of Boston
- Bibliography of Paris
