= Bibliography of Boston =

The following is a list of works about Boston, Massachusetts.

== Nonfiction ==
=== General ===
- Beagle, Jonathan M.; Penn, Elan (2006). Boston: A Pictorial Celebration. Sterling Publishing Company, Inc. ISBN 978-1-4027-1977-6.
- Bluestone, Barry; Stevenson, Mary Huff (2002). The Boston Renaissance: Race, Space, and Economic Change in an American Metropolis. Russell Sage Foundation. ISBN 978-1-61044-072-1.
- Bolino, August C. (2012). Men of Massachusetts: Bay State Contributors to American Society. iUniverse. ISBN 978-1-4759-3376-5.
- Brown, Robin; The Boston Globe (2009). Boston's Secret Spaces: 50 Hidden Corners In and Around the Hub (1 ed.). Globe Pequot. ISBN 978-0-7627-5062-7.
- Christopher, Paul J. (2006). 50 Plus One Greatest Cities in the World You Should Visit. Encouragement Press, LLC. ISBN 978-1-933766-01-0.
- Hantover, Jeffrey; King, Gilbert (2008). City in Time: Boston. Sterling Publishing Company, Inc. ISBN 978-1-4027-3300-0.
- Kennedy, Lawrence W. (1994). Planning the City Upon a Hill: Boston Since 1630. University of Massachusetts Press. ISBN 978-0-87023-923-6.
- Krieger, Alex; Cobb, David; Turner, Amy, eds. (2001). Mapping Boston. MIT Press. ISBN 978-0-262-61173-2.
- O'Connell, James C. (2013). The Hub's Metropolis: Greater Boston's Development from Railroad Suburbs to Smart Growth. MIT Press. ISBN 9780262018753.
- O'Connor, Thomas H. (2000). Boston: A to Z. Harvard University Press. ISBN 978-0-674-00310-1.
- Peterson, Mark (2019). The City-State of Boston: The Rise and Fall of an Atlantic Power, 1630−1865. Princeton: Princeton University Press. ISBN 978-0-691-17999-5.
- Price, Michael; Sammarco, Anthony Mitchell (2000). Boston's immigrants, 1840–1925. Arcadia Publishing. ISBN 978-0-7524-0921-4.
- Seasholes, Nancy S. (2003). Gaining Ground: A History of Landmaking in Boston. Cambridge, Massachusetts: MIT Press. ISBN 978-0-262-19494-5.
- Shand-Tucci, Douglass (1999). Built in Boston: City & Suburb, 1800–2000 (2 ed.). University of Massachusetts Press. ISBN 978-1-55849-201-1.
- Vrabel, Jim; Bostonian Society (2004). When in Boston: A Time Line & Almanac. Northeastern University Press. ISBN 978-1-55553-620-6.
- Whitehill, Walter Muir; Kennedy, Lawrence W. (2000). Boston: A Topographical History (3 ed.). Belknap Press of Harvard University Press. ISBN 978-0-674-00268-5.

=== Bibliographies ===
- Henry Stevens (1866). "Boston". Catalogue of the American Books in the Library of the British Museum. London: C. Whittingham at the Chiswick Press.
- Joseph Sabin, ed. (1869). "Boston". Bibliotheca Americana. Vol. 2. New York. OCLC 13972268.
- Frederic Beecher Perkins (1876), "Boston", Check List for American Local History: Reprinted with Additions from the Bulletins of the Boston Public Library, Rockwell & Churchill, pp. 12–33, hdl:2027/uc1.b4524371
- "Index of Articles upon American Local History, in Historical Collections in the Boston Public Library: Boston", Bulletin of the Boston Public Library, vol. 5, September 1883, pp. 437–440, hdl:2027/njp.32101065267914
- Robert C. Brooks (1901), "Boston", Bibliography of Municipal Problems and City Conditions, Municipal Affairs, vol. 5 (2nd ed.), New York: Reform Club, OCLC 1855351

=== Directories ===
- Boston Directory

=== Guides ===
- "Boston", Appleton's Illustrated Hand-Book of American Cities, New York: D. Appleton and Company, 1876
- "Boston", United States (4th ed.), Leipzig: K. Baedeker, 1909, pp. 253–274, OCLC 02338437
- "Boston". Automobile Blue Book. New York: Automobile Blue Book Publishing Co. 1917.
- Federal Writers' Project (1937), "Boston: the Hub of the Universe", Massachusetts: a Guide to its Places and People, American Guide Series, Cambridge: Riverside Press
- Donlyn Lyndon (1982), The City Observed, Boston: a Guide to the Architecture of the Hub, New York: Vintage Books, OL 23256413M
- John Harris (1989), Boston Globe Historic Walks in Old Boston, Chester: Globe Pequot Press, OL 2213403M
- Boston, New York: Fodor's, 1996, OL 24710817M
- "New England: Massachusetts: Boston", USA, Let's Go, New York: St. Martin's Press, 1999, OL 24937240M
- Boston (2nd ed.), Lonely Planet, 2003, OL 24751454M
- Morris, Jerry (2005). The Boston Globe Guide to Boston. Globe Pequot. ISBN 978-0-7627-3430-6.
- Southworth, Michael; Southworth, Susan (2008). AIA Guide to Boston, 3rd Edition: Contemporary Landmarks, Urban Design, Parks, Historic Buildings and Neighborhoods (3 ed.). Globe Pequot. ISBN 978-0-7627-4337-7.
- Wechter, Eric B.; et al. (2009). Fodor's Boston 2009. Random House Digital, Inc. ISBN 978-1-4000-0699-1.
- Vorhees, Mara (2009). Lonely Planet Boston City Guide (4 ed.). Lonely Planet. ISBN 978-1-74179-178-5.
- Hull, Sarah (2011). The Rough Guide to Boston (6 ed.). Penguin. ISBN 978-1-4053-8247-2.

=== History by date of publication ===
==== 1700s ====
- Names of the Streets, Lanes & Alleys within the Town of Boston, Boston: Printed by Bartholomew Green, 1708, OCLC 511023684
- Thomas Pemberton (1794), Topographical and Historical Description of Boston

==== 1800s-1840s ====
- Abraham Rees (1819), "Boston", The Cyclopaedia, London: Longman, Hurst, Rees, Orme & Brown
- Caleb H. Snow (1828). History of Boston. Boston: Abel Bowen.
- David Brewster, ed. (1830). "Boston". Edinburgh Encyclopædia. Edinburgh: William Blackwood.
- "Boston", American Advertising Directory, for Manufacturers and Dealers in American Goods, New York: Jocelyn, Darling & Co., 1831, OCLC 1018684

==== 1850s-1890s ====
- Quincy, Josiah (1852). A Municipal History of the Town and City of Boston During Two Centuries from September 17, 1630, to September 17, 1830. Boston: Charles C. Little & James Brown. OL 7063863M.
- J. Willoughby Rosse (1858). "Boston". Index of Dates ... Facts in the Chronology and History of the World. London: H.G. Bohn. hdl:2027/uva.x030807786 – via HathiTrust.
- King, Moses (1878). King's hand-book of Boston. Cambridge, Mass.: M. King.
- Charles Francis Adams, Jr. (1868). "Boston". North American Review. 106 (218): 1–25. hdl:2027/chi.25854397. JSTOR 25108129.
- Justin Winsor, ed. (1880–1881), Memorial History of Boston, Boston: James R. Osgood and Company, OCLC 4953409
  - v.1: Early and Colonial Periods
  - v.2: Provincial Period
  - v.3: Revolutionary Period. The Last Hundred Years, Pt.1
  - v.4: Last Hundred Years, Pt.2. Special topics
- Edward H. Savage (1884), Boston Events, Boston: Tolman & White, printers, OL 7112253M
- Bacon, Edwin M., and Edward, George, "Ellis Bacon's Dictionary of Boston", Houghton, Mifflin and company, 1886.
- South End House (1898), Robert A. Woods (ed.), The City Wilderness: a Settlement Study, Boston: Houghton Mifflin, OCLC 849952

==== 1900s-1940s ====
- "Boston". Chambers's Encyclopaedia. London. 1901.
- Frederick Harold Fay (1901), Population and finances of Boston, Boston: Municipal Print. Office, OCLC 6055315, OL 6912929M
- Henry James (1906). "Boston". North American Review. 182 (592): 333–355. hdl:2027/chi.16251213. JSTOR 25105534.
- "Selectmen Minutes 1818–1822", Records Relating to the Early History of Boston, City of Boston, 1909
- A Record of the Streets, Alleys, Places, Etc., in the City of Boston, City of Boston, 1910, OL 14037282M
- Robert A. Woods (1910). "Boston". In William Dwight Porter Bliss and Rudolph Michael Binder (ed.). New Encyclopedia of Social Reform. New York: Funk & Wagnalls. pp. 124–126.
- Edward Hungerford (1913), "Our Ancient Hub", Personality of American Cities, New York: McBride, Nast & Company
- Andrew Cunningham McLaughlin and Albert Bushnell Hart, ed. (1914). "Boston". Cyclopedia of American Government. Vol. 1. D. Appleton and Company.
- Hartnell, Edward Mussey; McGlenen, Edward Webster & Skelton, Edward Oliver (1916). Boston and its story, 1630–1915. City of Boston (Mass.) Printing Department.
- Edwin M. Bacon (1916). Book of Boston: Fifty Years' Recollections of the New England Metropolis. Boston: Pilgrim Press. ISBN 9780788428951.
- Gertrude Van Duyn Southworth; Stephen Elliott Kramer (1922). "Boston". Great Cities of the United States. Syracuse, New York: Iroquois Publishing Company.
- Atlas of the City of Boston. G.W. Bromley & Co. 1928 – via State Library of Massachusetts.
- S. Foster Damon (1935). "The Genesis of Boston". The Atlantic. 156.
- Miller, John C. (1936). Sam Adams, Pioneer in Propaganda.
- Atlas of the City of Boston. G.W. Bromley & Co. 1938 – via State Library of Massachusetts.
- Bridenbaugh, Carl (1938). Cities in the Wilderness-The First Century of Urban Life in America 1625–1742.
- Handlin, Oscar (1941). Boston's Immigrants: A Study in Acculturation. Statistical analysis of census data.

==== 1950s-1960s ====
- Bridenbaugh, Carl (1955). Cities in Revolt: Urban Life in America, 1743–1776.
- Blake, John B (1959). Public Health in the Town of Boston, 1630–1822. Harvard University Press.
- Kevin Lynch (1960), "Boston", Image of the City, Cambridge, Massachusetts: MIT Press, p. 16+, OL 5795447M
- Greater Boston Chamber of Commerce (1964), Report on the existing industrial crisis in the city of Boston, OL 24149173M
- Walter Muir Whitehill (1964), Boston: Portrait of a City, Barre, Massachusetts: Barre Publishers, OL 5912910M
- Henretta, J.A. (1965) "Economic Development and Social Structure in Colonial Boston", The William and Mary Quarterly 22(1): 75-92.
- Rutman, Darrett B. (1965). Winthrop's Boston: Portrait of a Puritan Town, 1630–1649. U of North Carolina Press.
- Martin Green (1966). Problem of Boston. W.W. Norton & Company. OCLC 1016725.
- Ward, D. (1966) "The Industrial Revolution and the Emergence of Boston's Central Business District", Economic Geography 42 (2): 152-171.
- George F. Weston (1967), Boston ways: high, by, and folk, Boston: Beacon Press, OL 16413538M
- Waters, John J. (1968). The Otis Family in Provincial and Revolutionary Massachusetts.
- Whitehill, Walter Muir (1968). Boston: A Topographical History (2nd ed.). Harvard University Press. On geography and neighborhoods.
- Stephan Thernstrom and Richard Sennett, ed. (1969), Nineteenth-Century Cities, Yale Studies of the City, Yale University Press, OL 5440390M (includes essays about Boston)

==== 1970s ====
- Warden, Gerard B. (1970). Boston, 1689–1776. The standard history for the period.
- Carl Seaburg (1971), Boston Observed, Boston: Beacon Press, OL 4769638M
- Boston Redevelopment Authority (1972), City of Boston: current problems and issues, OL 24621988M
- Darrett B. Rutman (1973), "Boston: 'A Citty upon a Hill'", in Alexander B. Callow (ed.), American Urban History (2nd ed.), New York: Oxford University Press, OL 5307653M
- Stephan Thernstrom (1973), The Other Bostonians: Poverty and Progress in the American Metropolis, 1880–1970, Harvard Studies in Urban History, Harvard University Press, ISBN 978-0674644953
- VOGEL, MORRIS J. "BOSTON'S HOSPITALS, 1870-1930: A SOCIAL HISTORY." (PhD dissertation, The University of Chicago; ProQuest Dissertations & Theses, 1974. T-25317).
- McCaughey, Robert A. (1974). Josiah Quincy 1772–1864: The Last Federalist. Harvard University Press.
- Jones, Howard Mumford; Jones, Bessie Zaban (1975). The Many Voices of Boston: A Historical Anthology 1630–1975. Boston: Little, Brown and Company. ISBN 978-0-316-47282-1.\
- Russell, Francis (1975). A City in Terror: Calvin Coolidge and the 1919 Boston Police Strike.
- Conzen, Michael P. & Lewis, George King, eds. (1976). Boston: A Geographical Portrait.
- Trout, Charles H. (1977). Boston, the Great Depression, and the New Deal.
- Warner, Sam Bass (1978). Streetcar Suburbs: The Process of Growth in Boston, 1870–1900 (2nd ed.).
- Douglass Shand-Tucci (1978), Built in Boston: City and Suburb, 1800–1950, New York Graphic Society, OL 24751516M
- Eisinger, Peter K. (1978). "Ethnic political transition in Boston, 1884–1933: Some lessons for contemporary cities". Political Science Quarterly. 93 (2): 217–239. doi:10.2307/2148607. JSTOR 2148607.

==== 1980s ====
- Jane Holtz Kay (1980), Lost Boston, Boston: Houghton Mifflin, ISBN 978-0395276099
- Allan Pred (1980), "Boston's City-System Interdependencies", Urban Growth and City Systems in the United States, 1840–1860, Harvard Studies in Urban History, Harvard University Press, pp. 65–83, ISBN 9780674930919
- Ory Mazar Nergal, ed. (1980), "Boston", Encyclopedia of American Cities, New York: E.P. Dutton, OL 4120668M
- Holli, Melvin G. & Jones, Peter d'A., eds. (1981). Biographical Dictionary of American Mayors, 1820–1980. Greenwood Press. Short scholarly biographies each of the city's mayors 1820 to 1980. See index at pp. 406–411 for list.
- Peter Vanderwarker (1982), Boston Then and Now: 59 Boston sites photographed in the past and present, New York: Dover Publications, OL 4271212M
- Vanderwarker, Peter (1982). Boston Then and Now. Courier Dover Publications. ISBN 978-0-486-24312-2.
- Wickersham, Jay (December 7, 1982). "Browsing tour: A guide to the guides to Boston architecture". The Boston Phoenix.
- Tager, Jack, and John W. Ifkovic, eds. Massachusetts in the Gilded Age: Selected Essays (1983), extensive coverage of Boston.
- Formisano, Ronald P. & Burns, Constance K., eds. (1984). Boston, 1700–1980: The Evolution of Urban Politics. Greenwood Press.
- "City with a Ticking Time Bomb", Financial Times, London, March 6, 1984
- Vogel, Morris J. The Invention of the Modern Hospital: Boston 1870-1930 (U of Chicago Press,1985)
- Gamm, Gerald H. (1989). The making of the New Deal Democrats: Voting behavior and realignment in Boston, 1920–1940. University of Chicago Press.

==== 1990s ====
- Beatty, Jack (1992). The Rascal King: The Life and Times of James Michael Curley, 1874–1958.
- Lawrence W. Kennedy (1992), Planning the City upon a Hill: Boston since 1630, Amherst: University of Massachusetts Press, OL 1562221M
- O'Toole, James M. (1992). Militant and Triumphant: William Henry O'Connell and the Catholic Church in Boston, 1859–1944.
- Robert Campbell; Peter Vanderwarker (1992), Cityscapes of Boston: an American City Through Time, Boston: Houghton Mifflin Co., OL 1562103M
- George Thomas Kurian (1994), "Boston", World Encyclopedia of Cities, vol. 1: North America, Santa Barbara, California: ABC-CLIO, OL 1431653M (fulltext via Open Library)
- Fischer, David Hackett (1994). Paul Revere's Ride. Oxford University Press.
- Susan Wilson (1994), Boston Sites & Insights, Boston: Beacon Press, OL 1421334M
- Sammarco, Anthony Mitchell (1995). Boston: A Century of Progress. Dover, N.H: Arcadia Publishing. ISBN 978-0-738538761. OL 1028399M.
- O'Connor, Thomas H. (1995). The Boston Irish: A Political History.
- Sammarco, Anthony Mitchell (1997). The Great Boston Fire of 1872. Images of America. Arcadia Publishing.
- Lawrence W. Kennedy (1998). "Boston, Massachusetts". Encyclopedia of Urban America. ABC-CLIO. ISBN 9780874368468 – via Credo Reference. (subscription required)

==== 2000s ====
- Deutsch, Sarah. (2000). Women and the City: Gender, Space, and Power in Boston, 1870–1940. Oxford University Press.
- Thomas H. O'Connor, Boston, A to Z (Cambridge: Harvard University Press, 2000)
- Walter Muir Whitehill (2000), Boston: a Topographical History (3rd ed.), Belknap Press of Harvard University Press, OL 58903M
- Sammarco, Anthony Mitchell & Price, Michael (2000). Boston's immigrants, 1840–1925. Images of America. Arcadia Publishing.
- Vale, Lawrence J. (2000). From the Puritans to the Projects: Public Housing and Public Neighbors. Cambridge, Mass.: Harvard Press.
- Tager, Jack. Boston Riots: Three Centuries of Social Violence (Northeastern University Press, 2001)
- Kane, Paula M. (2001). Separatism and Subculture: Boston Catholicism, 1900–1920.
- Tager, Jack. (2001) Boston Riots: Three Centuries of Social Violence (Upne, 2001).
- Matos Rodrííguez, Féélix V. (2001) "'The Browncoats are Coming': Latino Public History in Boston." Public Historian 23.4 (2001): 15-28.
- Bjarkman, Peter C. (2002) Boston Celtics Encyclopedia (Sports Publishing LLC, 2002).
- Charles C. Euchner, ed. (2003), Governing Greater Boston, Rappaport Institute for Greater Boston, ISBN 978-0-9718427-1-7
- Edward Glaeser (2003), Reinventing Boston: 1640–2003, Harvard Institute of Economic Research, archived from the original on September 11, 2007
- Nancy S. Seasholes (2003). Gaining Ground: a History of Landmaking in Boston. Cambridge, Massachusetts: MIT Press. ISBN 978-0262194945.
- Ulrich, Laurel Thatcher (July 2003). "Big Dig, Little Dig, Hidden Worlds: Boston". Common-Place. 3 (4). American Antiquarian Society.
- Rawson, Michael. (2004) "The nature of water: reform and the antebellum crusade for municipal water in Boston." Environmental history 9.3 (2004): 411-435.
- Dolin, Eric Jay. (2004) Political waters: the long, dirty, contentious, incredibly expensive but eventually triumphant history of Boston Harbor, a unique environmental success story (University of Massachusetts Press, 2004).
- Minardi, Margot. (2004) "The Boston inoculation controversy of 1721-1722: an incident in the history of race." William and Mary Quarterly 61.1 (2004): 47-76. online
- David Levinson, ed. (2004). "Boston". Encyclopedia of Homelessness. Sage Publications. ISBN 978-0-7619-2751-8.
- Jim Vrabel (2004), When in Boston: a Time Line & Almanac, Boston: Northeastern University Press, ISBN 978-1555536213
- Carr, Jacqueline Barbara. (2005) After the Siege: A Social History of Boston 1775-1800. Upne, 2005.
- David Marley (2005), "Boston", Historic Cities of the Americas, Santa Barbara, California: ABC-CLIO, ISBN 978-1576070277
- Kaufman, Polly Welts, et al. (2006) Boston Women's Heritage Trail: Seven Self-guided Walking Tours Through Four Centuries of Boston Women's History (Applewood Books, 2006).
- Nathan, Gavin. (2006) Historic Taverns of Boston: 370 Years of Tavern History in One Definitive Guide (iUniverse, 2006).
- Kay, Jane Holtz. (2006) Lost Boston (Univ of Massachusetts Press, 2006), destroyed buildings.
- Puleo, Stephen. (2007) The Boston Italians: A Story of Pride, Perseverance, and Paesani, from the Years of the Great Immigration to the Present Day (Beacon Press, 2007).
- Gelber, Scott. (2008) "'The crux and the magic': The Political History of Boston Magnet Schools, 1968–1989." Equity & Excellence in Education 41.4 (2008): 453-466.
- Simons, D. Brenton (2008). Boston Beheld: Antique Town and Country Views. University Press of New England. ISBN 978-1-58465-740-8.
- Connolly, James J (2009). The Triumph of Ethnic Progressivism: urban political culture in Boston, 1900–1925.
- John Hanson Mitchell (2009). Paradise of All These Parts: A Natural History of Boston. Beacon Press. ISBN 978-0-8070-7149-6.
- Wolff, Katherine. (2009) Culture club: The curious history of the Boston Athenaeum (University of Massachusetts Press, 2009).

==== 2010-present ====
- Carp, Benjamin L (2010). Defiance of the Patriots: The Boston Tea Party and the Making of America.
- York, Neil L. (2010) The Boston Massacre: A History with Documents (Routledge, 2010).
- Johnson, Arthur M., and Barry E. Supple. (2013) Boston Capitalists and Western Railroads (Harvard University Press, 2013).
- Whitehill, Walter Muir. (2013) Boston Public Library (Harvard University Press, 2013).
- Holmes, Pauline. (2013) A Tercentenary History of the Boston Public Latin School, 1635–1935 (Harvard University Press, 2013).
- American Cities Project (2013). "Boston". America's Big Cities in Volatile Times: City Profiles. Washington, D.C.: Pew Charitable Trusts.
- Sammarco, Anthony Mitchell (May 1, 2014). Lost Boston. Pavilion Press. ISBN 978-1-909815049.
- Rawson, Michael J. (2014). Eden on the Charles: The Making of Boston. Harvard University Press. ISBN 978-0674416833.
- Johnson, Marilynn S. (2015). The New Bostonians: How Immigrants Have Transformed the Metro Area since the 1960s. University of Massachusetts Press.
- Bagley, Joseph M. (2016) A history of Boston in 50 artifacts (University Press of New England, 2016).
- "Boston's income divide largest in US", Boston Globe, January 15, 2016
- "Better use of data could make cities more efficient—and more democratic", The Economist, March 26, 2016
- Buccitelli, Anthony (2016). City of Neighborhoods: Memory, Folklore, and Ethnic Place In Boston. US: University of Wisconsin Press. doi:10.3368/307134 – via Big Ten Open Books.
- Levesque, George A. (2018) Black Boston: African American life and culture in urban America, 1750–1860 (Routledge, 2018).
- Peterson, Mark (2019). The City-State of Boston: The Rise and Fall of an Atlantic Power, 1630–1865. Princeton University Press.

== See also ==
- Media in Boston
- Boston Book Festival
- List of booksellers in Boston
