= Going Home in the Rain =

Collection of short stories in English by Indian writer Monideepa Sahu

Going home in the rain and other stories
- Author: Monideepa Sahu
- Language: English
- Genre: Short Stories
- Publisher: Kitaab
- Publication date: 2016
- Publication place: India
- English publication date: 22 May 2016
- Media type: Print Paperback
- Pages: 101
- ISBN: 9789810934033

Going home in the rain is a collection of short stories in English by Indian writer Monideepa Sahu. The book was released on 22 May 2016 in Bhubaneswar.

The book is a collection of fourteen stories of various lengths. The stories have been described as, “Everyday situations and people reveal extraordinary facets.” In an interview with The New Indian Express the author mentions "Loneliness of life in big cities; horrors of war; love, loss, longing and hope; artistic integrity versus commercial success are some of the varying themes in the stories." The aim of the author in these stories was to reveal numerous perspectives of human life through short stories.

== See also ==
- Riddle of the Seventh Stone, a 2010 novel by Monideepa Sahoo
