= Kote Venkataramana Temple, Bengaluru =

Coordinates: 12.959524°N 77.574305°E

Kote Venkataramana Temple,
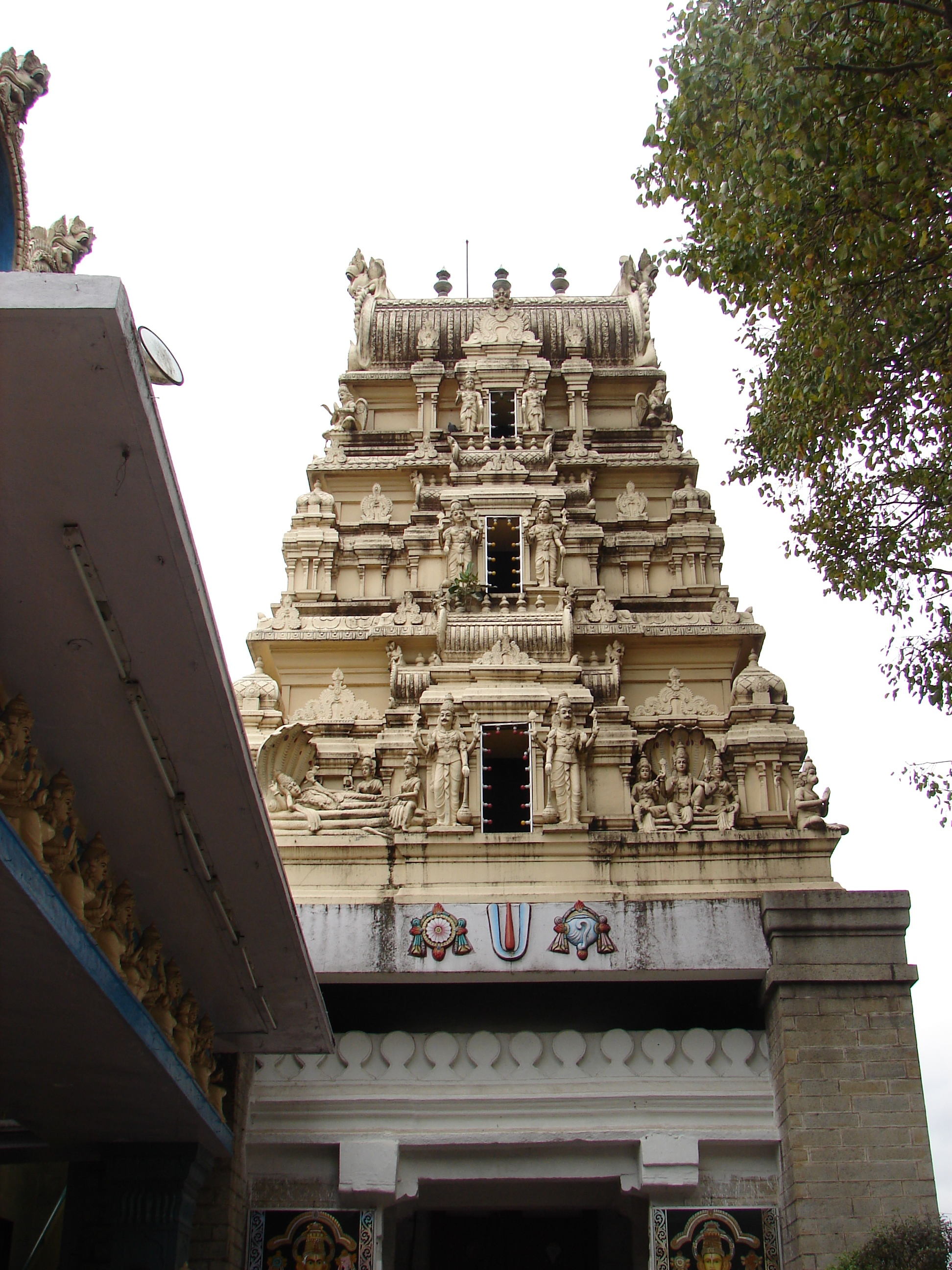
- Gopura (tower) over shrine in Kote Venkataramana Swamy Temple (17th century) at Bengaluru.

Religion
- Affiliation: Hinduism
- District: Bangalore
- Deity: Venkateshwara

Location
- Location: Krishnarajendra Road, Bangalore
- State: Karnataka
- Country: India
- Interactive map of Kote Venkataramana Temple,

Architecture
- Completed: 1689

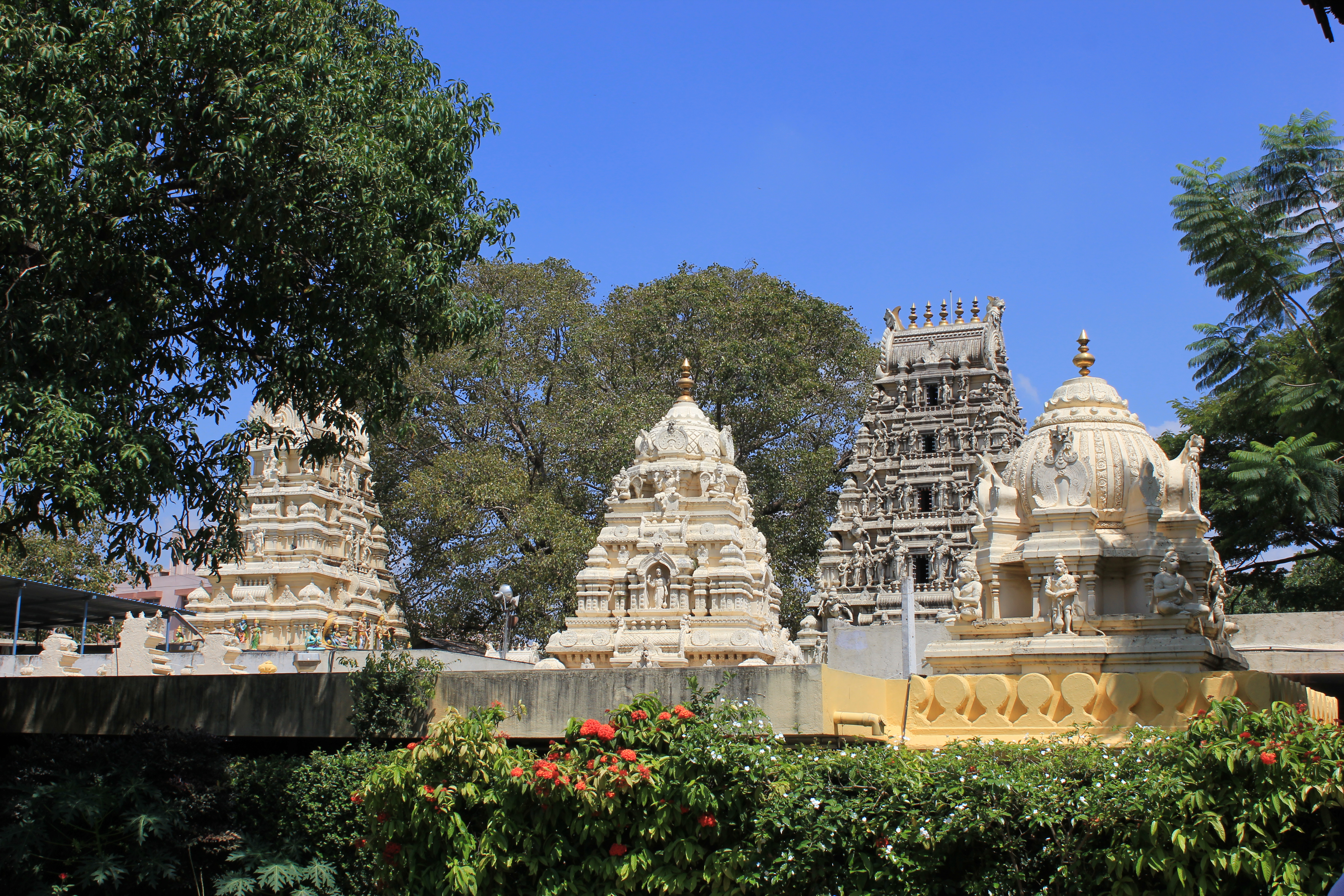
Gopura and Shikhara of the Kote Venkataramana temple in Bangalore

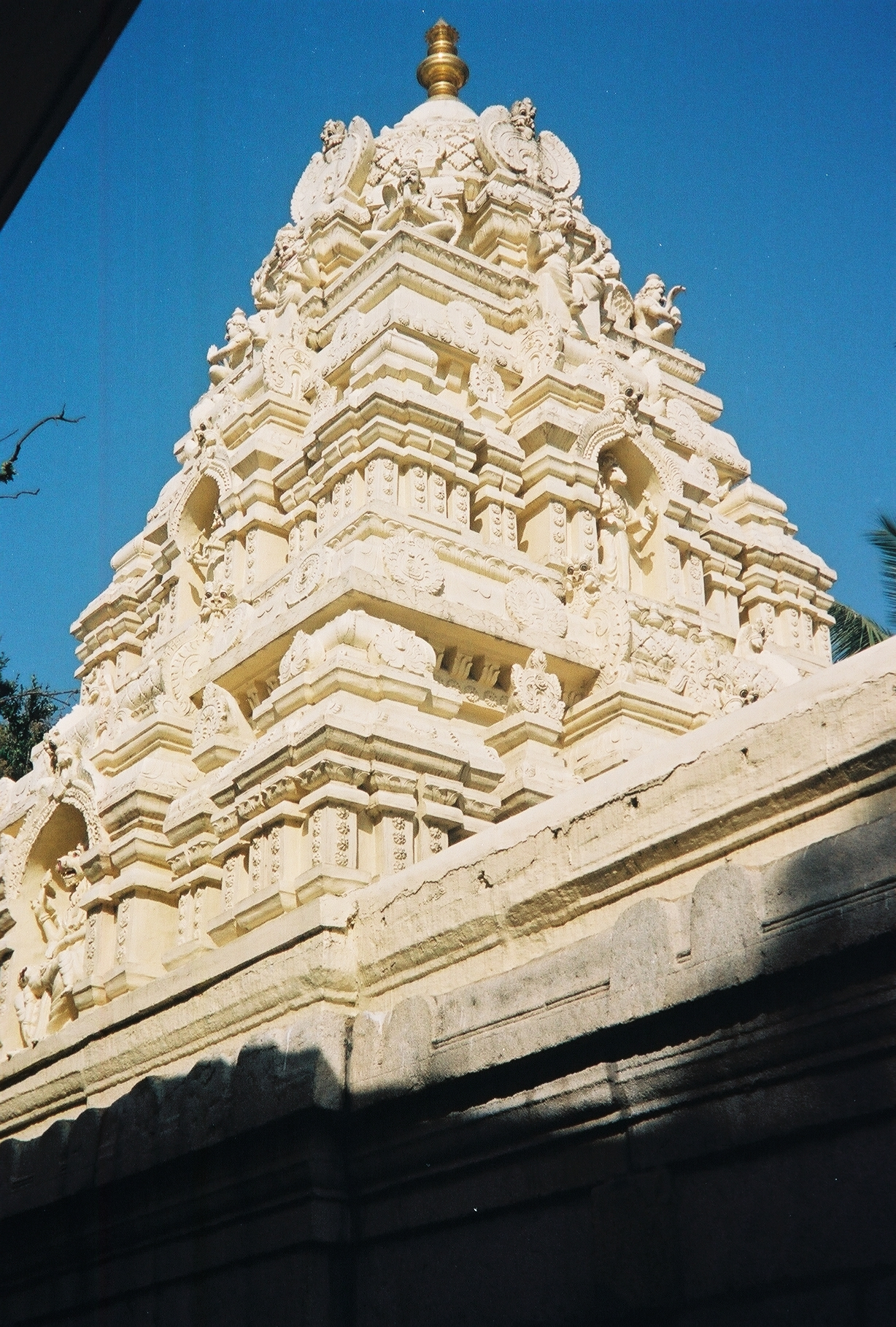
A shikhara (tower) over a shrine at the Kote Venkataramana temple

Kote Venkataramana Temple is a Hindu temple in Krishnarajendra Road, Bangalore, India dedicated to the Hindu god Venkateshwara. The temple was built in 1689 in Dravidian and Vijayanagara style by King Chikka Devaraja Wodeyar, then ruler of Mysore.

== Temple plan ==
The late 17th century Venkataramana temple is located near the old fort ("fort" is kote in Kannada language) adjacent to what was once the residence of Mysore Wodeyar royal family, and later became the palace of Tipu Sultan, a later ruler of the Mysore Kingdom.

The temple consists of a sanctum (garbhagriha) which is connected to a central hall (mantapa) by a vestibule. The walls of the sanctum and vestibule (antechamber) are plain but for a row of deity sculptures in frieze at the base. On the whole, the temple exudes modest decorative work and follows the general plan used in the temples within the palace complex in Mysore. The hall ceiling is supported by pillars that have "clusters of colonettes" alternating with yalis (mythical beasts from Hindu legend) in all four directions. This appears on each of the central columns.

The main festival celebrated here is Vaikuntha Ekadashi when thousands of devotees throng the temple.

This temple provided the setting for the treasure hunt in the book Riddle of the Seventh Stone

== Gallery ==
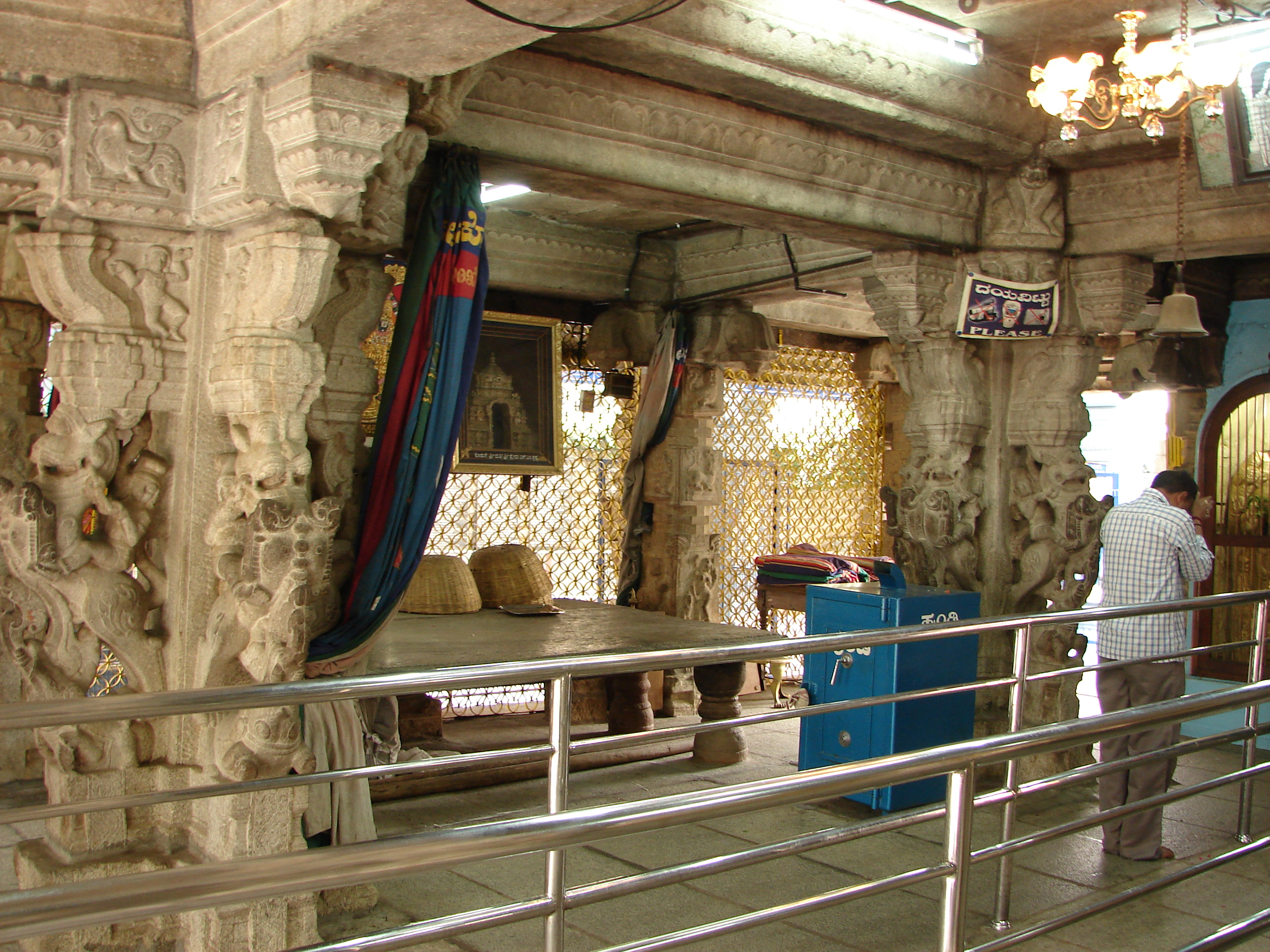
Ornate mantapa (hall) leading to the sanctum in Kote Venkataramana temple in Bengaluru (Bangalore). Central Yali pillars support mantapa ceiling

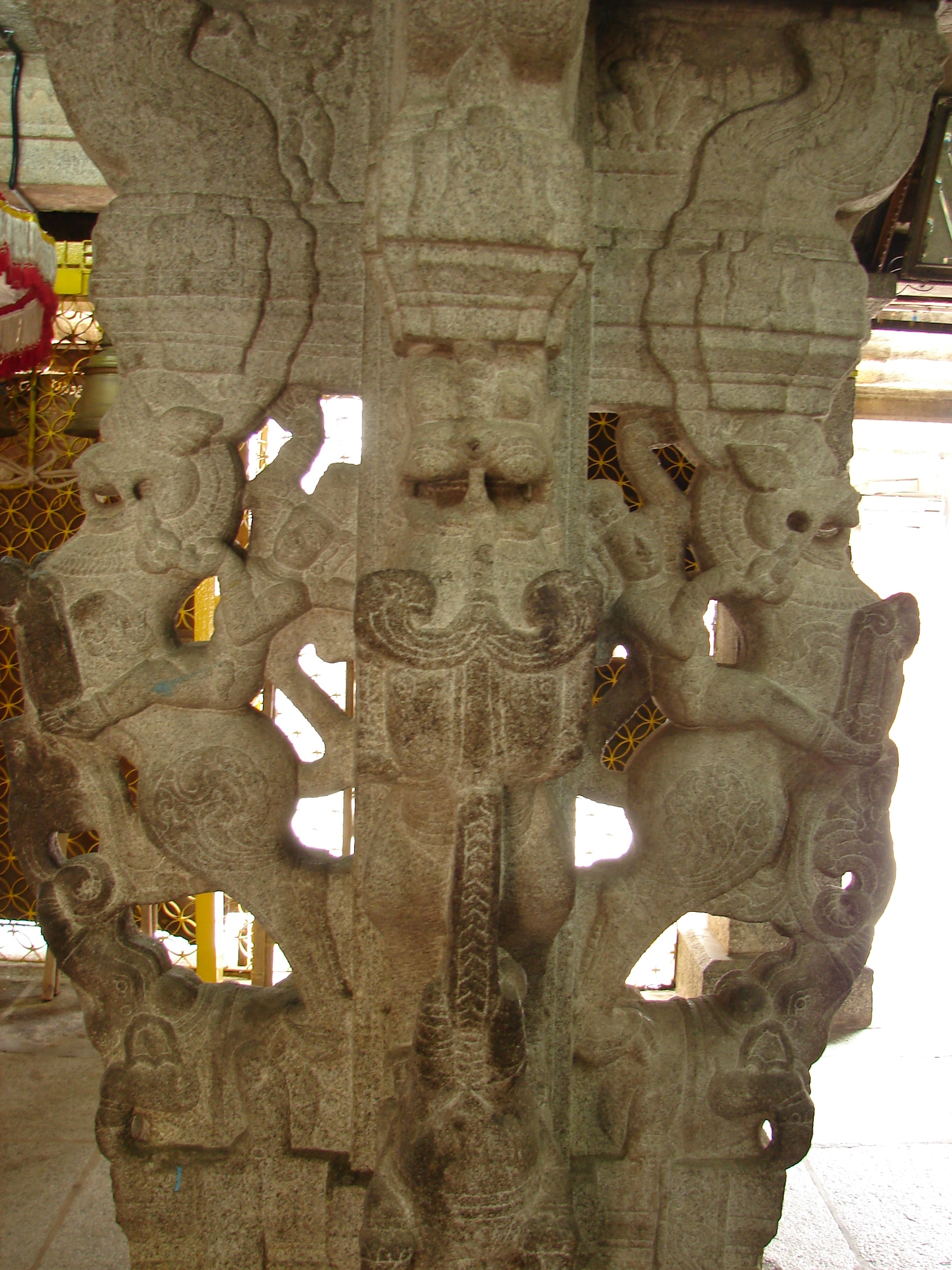
Close up of Yali pillar inside the mantapa in Kote Venkataramana temple in Bengaluru

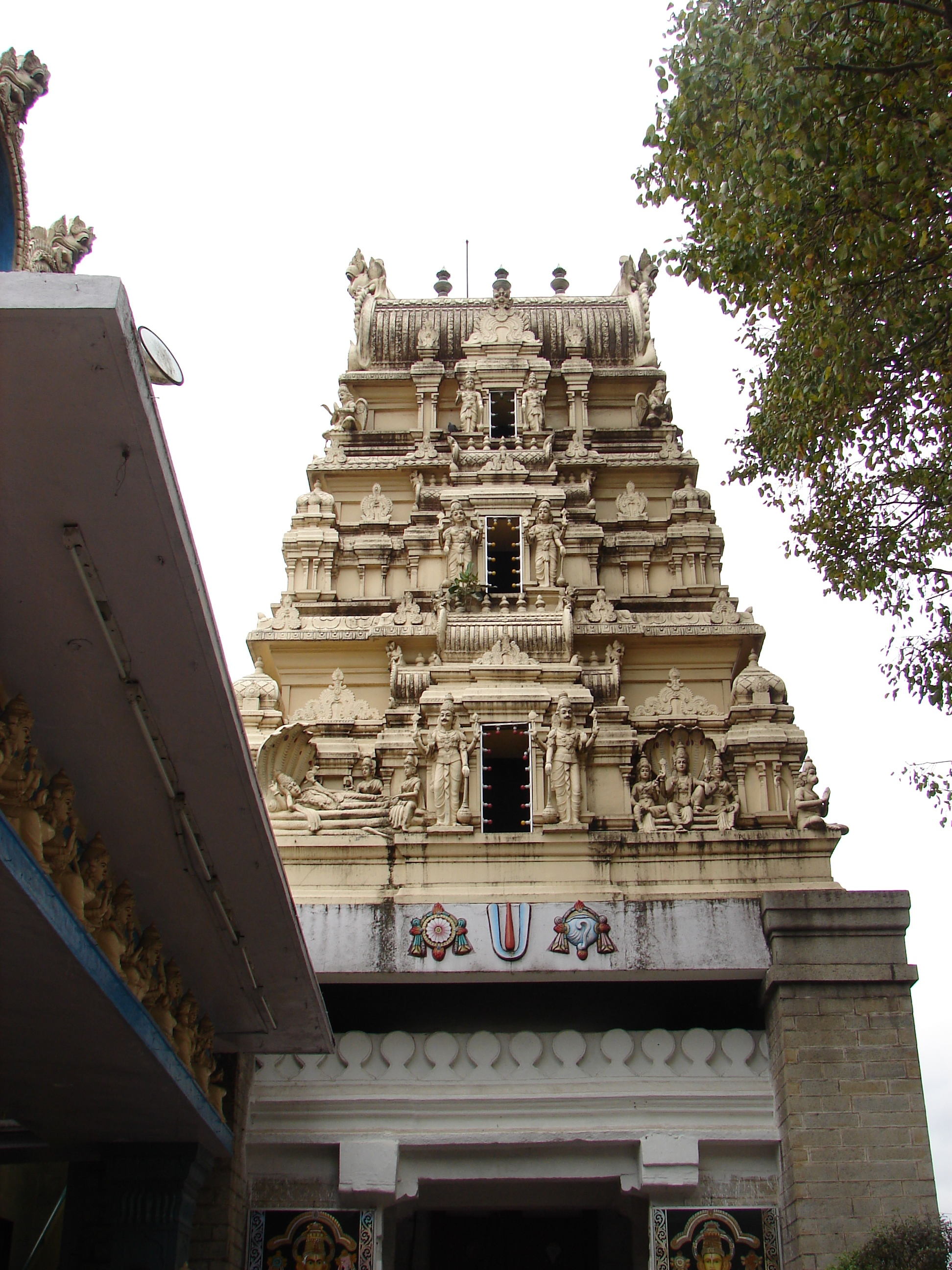
A shikhara (tower) in the Kote Venkataramana temple in Bengaluru

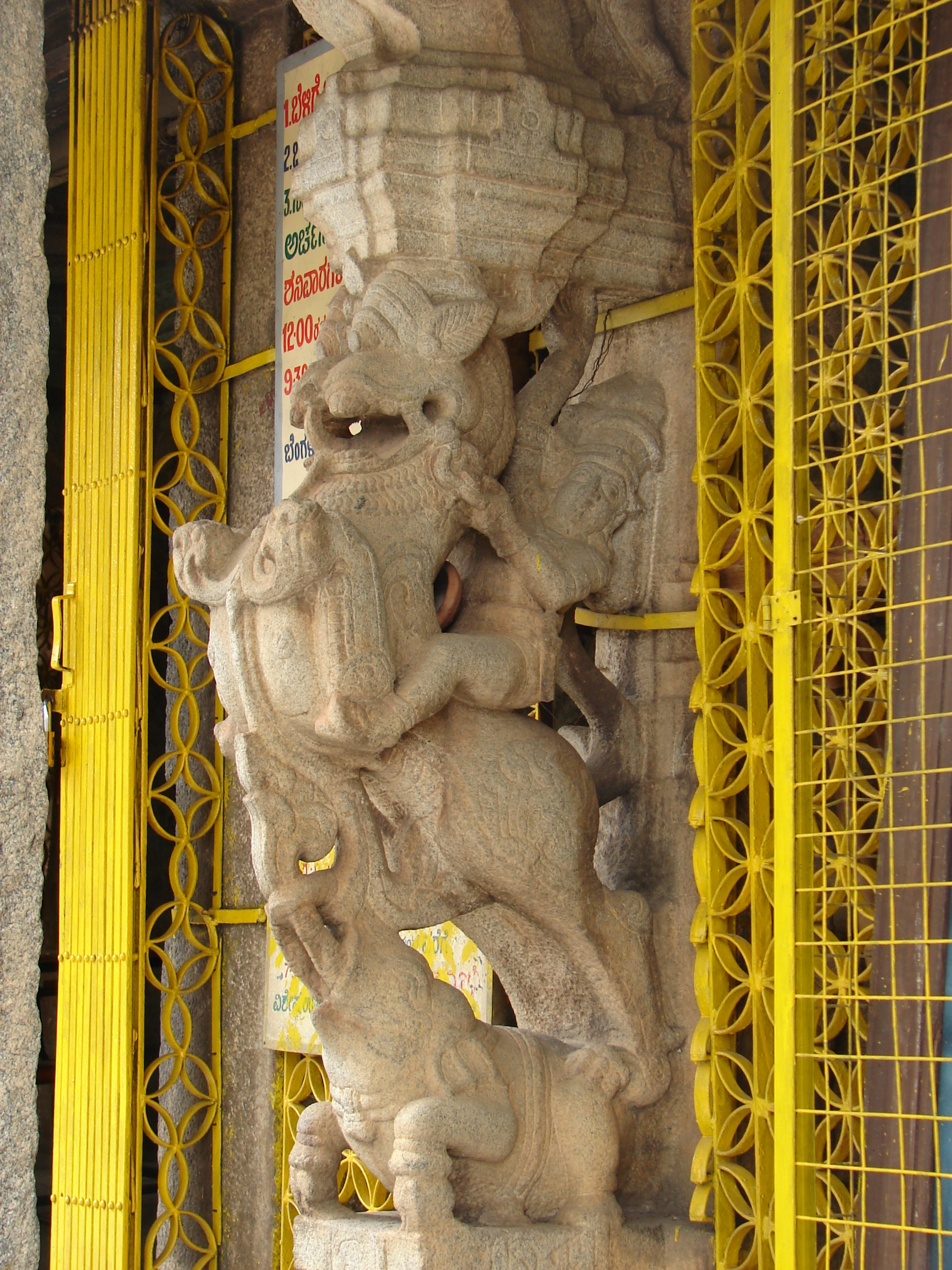
Yali pillar at Kote Venkataramana temple in Bengaluru
