= Eshwar Sundaresan =

Indian writer and journalist

- Born: 1 July 1975 (age 51)
- Occupations: Writer; Freelance journalist
- Notable work: Behind the silicon mask and Bangalored: the Expat Story

Eshwar Sundaresan is an Indian Bangalore-based writer and freelance journalist and a former Information Technology engineer. Some of his published books are Behind the Silicon Mask, Bangalored: the Expat Story, Red Curry, Wiser After, a collection of short stories, and his short story Golgotha won the Second prize in the book 'Winners' a collection of prize winning poems and stories by Unison and the British Council.

== Biography ==
Sunderasan was born on 1 July 1975 in a lower middle class household. His basic education was in engineering and he graduated in 1996. He then pursued a profession in software services and worked for six years and then resigned to take up career as a writer. He had a brief stint as a freelance journalist in Mangalore for which he was never paid. His life's experiences covering Mumbai, Mangalore and Milwaukee influence his writings as the subjects covered relate to the corporate world and "modern Newsspeak, India Apathetic, World Apathetic and the big why of Existence". He has also trained as a counselor with obtaining a Diploma in Counselling Skills in 2013 from the Banjara Academy. He is married and has a daughter, Risha.

Sunderasan showed interest in writing from a young age of 8 when he wrote a short story based on the marriage alliance event of his unmarried aunt but she tore it and threw it in the dustbin. However, he became a full-time writer with his debut novel Behind the Silicon Mask. It was a crime thriller written in the background of Milwaukee, USA which revolved around a serial killer who was targeting immigrants but whose identity could not be established. He started writing this book in 2003, completed in 2009 and but could find a publisher to publish it only in 2013. Writing about this book Sundaresan observes: "My focus has always been to write engaging stories that the reader would like to read. Be it thriller or any other genre, I try to make the books a page turner".

His second book Bangalored: the Expat Story was published in 2006. In this book he portrayed the Bangalore city from the perspective of the expatriates living in the city, unlike the earlier definition of "Bangalored", which was coined as a term of disparagement during the American presidential election in 2004, when it was meant as losing one's job in the US due to outsourcing to Bangalore. The story is presented mostly reflecting the life styles and experiences of the 12,000 and odd foreigners making a living in the metropolitan city which has the ambiance of a small town. He has presented the story mostly be way of interviews with some of the foreigners of different continents. His book Red Curry, is a leftist oriented story related to the Naxalite movement in the country.

== Reviews ==
On his first fiction novel Behind the Silicon Mask, Puneetinder Kaur Sidhu writing for the Tribune India observes: "Eshwar’s conversational style of writing in his first book, coupled with humorous insight about the people he encountered on the job, results in a light-hearted piece of work, worthy of a lazy weekend."

Vasant Gokarn writing a review Bangalored: the Expat Story for the Business Standard has observed: "There is a capsule of Bangalore's history at the end of the book, which would be of heightened interest to readers who are not familiar with the city. Bangalore has a history of great planners and administrators with vision, like Sir Mark Cubbon in the late 19th century, and Sir Mirza Ismail and Sir Mokshagundam Visweswariah in the first half of the 20th century." Kala Krishnan Ramesh in his review Bangalored: the Expat Storyfor The Hindu says: "Pleasant reading, varied voices, varied stories, good humour, and many things that we may not have known about Bangalore. Does it manage to capture what it set out to? The essence of being expatriate in Bangalore? I think it does, without going so deep as to make the book inaccessible to the general reader."

== Bibliography ==
- Mathew, Annie Chandy (2005). Winners: A Collection of Prize-winning Poems and Stories. unisun publications. ISBN 978-81-88234-11-0.
- Sundaresan, Eshwar (1 January 2006). Bangalored, the Expat Story. East West Books (Madras). ISBN 978-81-88661-44-2.
