= Riddle of the Seventh Stone =

2010 novel by Monideepa Sahu

- Book cover
- Author: Monideepa Sahu
- Illustrator: Pooja Pottenkulam
- Language: English
- Genre: Fantasy novel, Children's novel
- Publisher: Zubaan
- Publication date: 2010
- Publication place: India
- English publication date: 9 October 2010
- Media type: Print Paperback
- Pages: 164
- ISBN: 978-8189884802

Riddle of the Seventh Stone is a 2010 novel by Indian author Monideepa Sahu. This fantasy novel for children is set in Bengaluru, India. The book was longlisted for the Vodafone Crossword Book Award for 2011.

== Plot summary ==
Set in a herb shop on a bustling road in Bangalore, this book is about a spider and rat magically turning into human children. As children with help from their vermin friends the duo gang up with the grandchildren of the herb shop owner to save it from a land shark. In the course of their adventures they come across an ancient riddle, solving which leads them to the treasure of Kempegowda, an ancient king who founded Bangalore. The vermin's transformation to humans in nature and thinking, and their improving in the face of adversity is an underlying theme of the book.

Many places described in the book are in the old parts of Bangalore dating back to the times of the city's founding. The City Market, Avenue Road, Bangalore Fort and Kote Venkataramana Temple are real places.

== Characters ==
- Rishab: the aged rat who transforms into a shy and awkward boy. He overcomes his shyness to become the hero of the novel by solving the riddle of the seventh stone, finding the treasure and becoming friends with a girl called Geeta whom he saved from an accident.
- Shashie: the very old spider who transforms into a bossy and opinionated girl. She plays a pivotal role in the novel.
- Venkat Thatha: the owner of the rare herb store, an absent-minded old man worried about the future of his shop
- Ajji: Venkat Thata's wife, deaf but practical
- The twins Leela and Deepak: orphaned grandchildren of Venkat Thatha. They discover and try to civilize Rishab and Shashie.
- Shark: the mysterious scar-faced villain who doubles as a loan shark and a land shark out to snatch the store
- Minor characters like the wise bandicoot and the helpful policeman
- Numerous insects and rats who bravely help Rishab and his friends in their quest

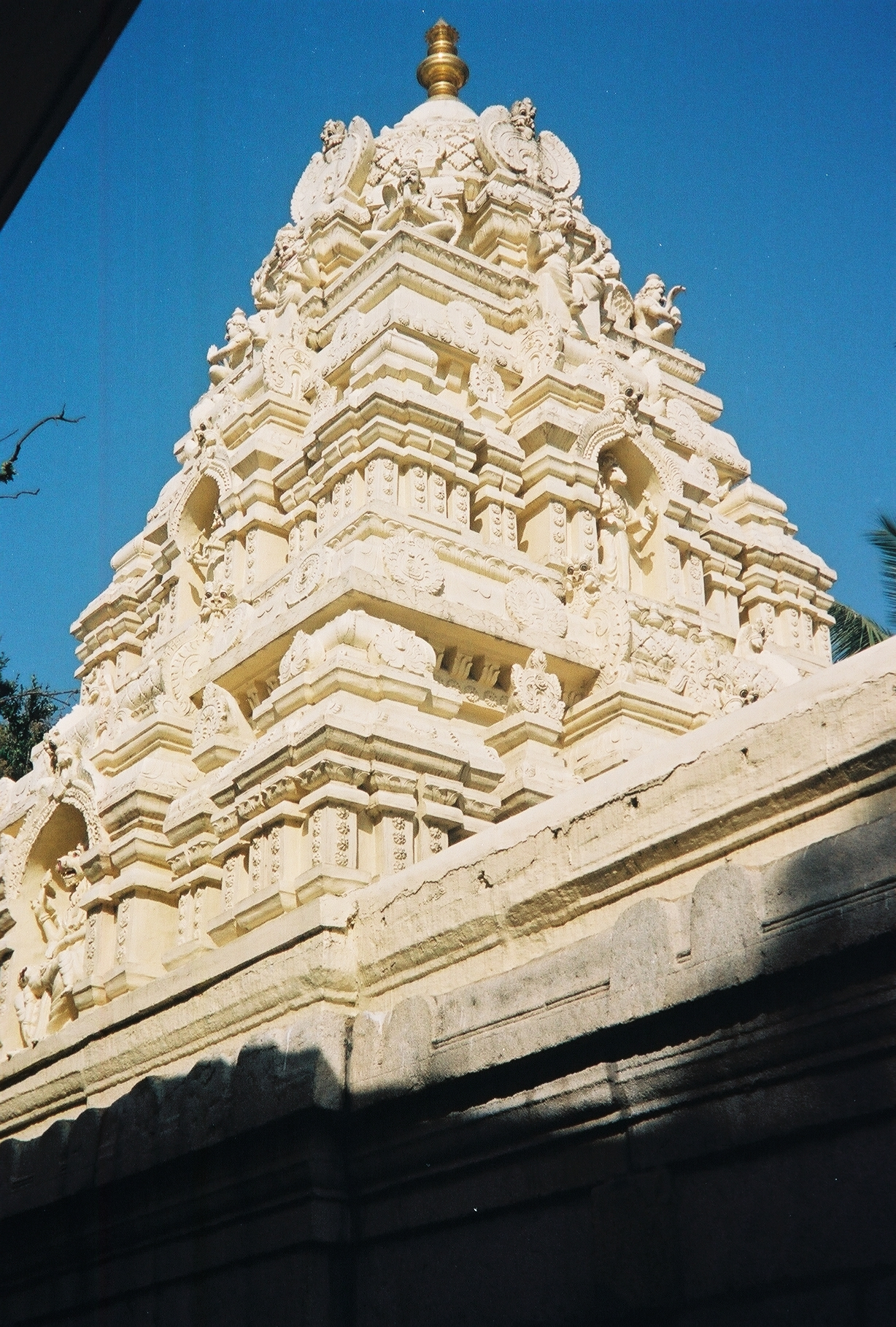
Kote Venkataramana Temple

== Development and publication ==
Monideepa Sahu got the idea of writing this book after meeting the owner of a shop selling rare herbs while doing research for an article for the newspaper Deccan Herald. A big spider weaving a web in a corner of the shop and a rat scurrying about the shop were the inspiration behind the main characters of the book, Rishab and Shashee. In the course of the author's conversations with long-term residents of Old Bangalore, she learnt about local life, and discovered old temples, churches and mosques. Hearing tales of local life, temple chariot festivals, the early morning flower market etc., related by people from diverse communities, inspired the characters and plot of her book. Although the book was written in 2003 it was rejected by a number of publishers for failing to follow established stereotypes, before being selected by Zubaan in 2008 as an anonymous pitch in the Kala Ghoda Arts Festival. The book was formally launched in Bangalore on 9 October 2010.

== Reviews ==
A review in The Hindu noted the unusual storyline and praised the book for a realistic portrayal of children and language. The reviewer praised Rishab as an adorable character and appreciated the book's humorous touches but found the decoding of the riddle weak. The Deccan Herald appreciated the fact that this novel as a fantasy set in India unlike most children's books. They noted the mix of adventure, fantasy, insects, vermin and a little bit of love made the novel fast-paced. The Bangalore Mirror found the description of Bangalore's underworld populated with rodents and roaches and not crooks, as a world full of fantasy and adventure in the labyrinths of drains and nooks of the old Bangalore.

Ranjana Kaul in the Book Review noted the "unlikely protagonists drawn from the world of vermin and insects, a world which humans generally tend to ignore or treat with disgust and repulsion. The book straddles these two antithetical yet interdependent worlds with ease through its unlikely heroes, the rat Rishabh and the bossy spider Shashee (spelt with a double 'e' for astrological reasons!) who find themselves catapulted unwillingly into the world of humans."

It has been noted, apart from nuggets of history of Bangalore, the novel also deals with ecological concerns, coexistence and the discovery of self-reliance. However, the author has denied having put in a moral in the book.

== See also ==
- Going home in the rain, a 2016 book by Monideepa Sahoo
