= Darrett B. Rutman =

American historian

- Born: March 4, 1929
- Died: April 11, 1997 (aged 68)
- Scientific career
- Fields: Historian
- Workplaces: University of Florida

Darrett Bruce Rutman (4 March 1929 – 11 April 1997) was a historian of early America. He received his Ph.D. from the University of Virginia in 1959. He was a distinguished scholar and served on the History faculties of the University of Minnesota, 1959–1968, the University of New Hampshire, 1968–1984, and the University of Florida in Gainesville, 1984–1996. He died of an aortic aneurysm on April 11, 1997.

Several of his books were co-authored by his wife, Anita H. Rutman.

== Bibliography ==
- American Puritanism: faith and practice, Darrett B. Rutman (1970, reprinted 1977) ISBN 0-393-00842-8
- The Great Awakening: event and exegesis, edited by Darrett B. Rutman (1970) ISBN 0-471-74725-4 (Paperback: ISBN 0-471-74726-2)
- Husbandmen of Plymouth: farms and villages in the Old Colony, 1620-1692, Darrett B. Rutman (1967)
- The morning of America, 1603-1789, Darrett B. Rutman (1971) ISBN 0-395-04333-6
- The Old Dominion: essays for Thomas Perkins Abernethy, Rutman, Darrett B. (1964)
- A Place in Time: Middlesex County, Virginia 1650-1750, by Darrett B. Rutman, Anita H. Rutman (1984) ISBN 0-393-30318-7
- A Place in Time: Explicatus, by Darrett B. Rutman, Anita H. Rutman (1984) ISBN 0-393-01820-2
- Small worlds, large questions: explorations in early American social history, 1600-1850, Darrett B. Rutman with Anita H. Rutman (1994) ISBN 0-8139-1529-5 (Paperback: ISBN 0-8139-1530-9)
- Rutman, Darrett B. Winthrop's Boston: Portrait of a Puritan Town, 1630-1649, (1965) ISBN 0-8078-0942-X
