= Michael J. Rawson =

Historian, author, and associate professor

Michael J. Rawson is a historian, author, and associate professor at the City University of New York's (CUNY) Brooklyn College. He was a finalist for the Pulitzer Prize for History in 2011 for Eden on the Charles: The Making of Boston. The book explores Boston's development in relation to its natural surroundings. Rawson received the American Public Works Association (APWA) Abel Wolman Award in 2011.

Rawson was previously on the faculties of University of Wisconsin and Stanford University. He received his Ph.D at the University of Wisconsin in 2005. From 2005 to 2007, he was a Mellon Postdoctoral Fellow at Stanford University. Rawson has served on the Public Works Historical Society's board of trustees.

== Selected publications ==
- "Discovering the Final Frontier: The Seventeenth-Century Encounter with the Lunar Environment," Environmental History 20, no. 2 (April 2015): 194-216.
- “Creating the Urban Hydraulic Machine: Water, Technology, and the Building of Boston,” in Terje Tvedt and Terje Oestigaard, eds., A History of Water, Series 3, Vol. 1. From Jericho to Cities in the Seas: A History of Urbanization and Water Systems (forthcoming from I. B. Tauris).
- “The March of Bricks and Mortar” (invited essay), Environmental History 17, no. 4, October 2012.
- “Rethinking Conservation: The Nineteenth-Century Battle to Save Boston Harbor,” in Richard Judd and Blake Harrison, eds., A Landscape History of New England (Cambridge: MIT Press, 2011).
- “A Horse Is a Horse, of Course, but Also Much More: Recovering the Animal Contribution to the Urbanization and Industrialization of America,” review essay in Journal of Urban History 37, no. 4 (July 2011): 614-618.
- “Gendered Waters: Boston’s Frog Pond Fountain” in Ari Hynynen, Petri Juuti, and Tapio Katko, eds., Water Fountains in the Cityscape (Kansas City, MO: Public Works Historical Society, 2011).
- “What Lies Beneath: Science, Nature, and the Making of Boston Harbor,” Journal of Urban History 35, no. 5 (July 2009): 675-697; Finalist, 2010 Alice Hamilton Prize and 2010 Fishel-Calhoun Prize for best article. Reprinted in Anthony Penna and Conrad Wright, eds., Remaking Boston: An Environmental History of the City and Its Surroundings (Pittsburgh: University of Pittsburgh Press, 2009).
- “On Common Ground: The Overlapping Fields of Environmental History and Planning History,” review essay in Journal of Planning History 7, no. 4 (November 2008): 354-360.
- “The Nature of Water: Reform and the Antebellum Crusade for Municipal Water in Boston,” Environmental History 9 (July 2004): 411-435; winner, 2005 Michael Robinson Award from the Public Works Historical Society for the best article in the field of public works history.

=== Books ===
- Eden on the Charles: The Making of Boston Harvard University Press (2011)
- The Nature of Tomorrow; A History of the Environmental Future Yale University Press (2021)
