= My Days in the Underworld: Rise of the Bangalore Mafia =

Book by Agni Shreedhar

- Author: Agni Sreedhar
- Language: English
- Set in: Bangalore
- Published: 2013
- Publisher: Tranquebar Press
- Publication place: India

My Days in the Underworld: Rise of the Bangalore Mafia is an autobiographical book written by Agni Sreedhar. Before becoming a writer, film maker and journalist he was an underworld don. He wanted to enter the Indian Administrative Service after studying for law. Circumstances (when his brother was beaten up by an underworld man), which he narrates in his novel, made him an underworld don for 20 years in Bangalore (now Bengaluru).

In this book he tells of his own experiences and encounters in the crime world of Bangalore, which runs on a track that never coalesces with the chaotic world of the common people governed by a distorted justice system. Initially, Sreedhar wrote a series of articles under the title Dadagiriya Dinagalu in Kannada language for his tabloid Agni, which he later translated into English under the title My Days in the Underworld-Rise of Bangalore Mafia with the help of Prathiba Nandakumar and V.G. Jaideep. The book was first published in 2013 by Tranquebar Press. The author says the book "also works as the story of the city".

== Story ==
In the introduction to the book, the author writes that most of the people have a distorted idea of the underworld, so he wanted to narrate the real crime world of Bangalore. The book is divided into five parts, and each part has multiple chapters. The book begins with the author's arrival in Bangalore in the summer of 1974 to get admitted in a college for higher education. Then he goes on narrating how he met different people and how he turned into an underworld don. The narration is presented from the perspective of the top political leaders of his time who ruled in the state and the other crime world dons who controlled the city, such as Dawood Ibrahim, Chhota Rajan, Sharad Shetty, Kotwal Ramchandra, Jayaraj and Muthappa Rai.

== Reviews ==
Writing for the Hindu, Muralidhara Khajane says: "The book throws light on notorious gangsters. In fact this is the first book that presents the history of Bangalore’s underworld, detailing the lives of dreaded dons, who ruled Bangalore underworld...."

== Award ==
This book won its author the Sahitya Academy Award.

== Bibliography ==
- Sreedhar, Agni (27 September 2013). My Days in the Underworld Rise of the Bangalore Mafia. Westland. ISBN 978-93-83260-34-8.
