= Bibliography of the Western United States =

Bibliography of the Western United States is a small selection of the most useful books and articles on the Western United States.

See also Bibliography of the American frontier. Bibliography of California history, Bibliography of Idaho history, Bibliography of Montana history, Bibliography of Oregon history, Bibliography of Wyoming history.

== Surveys ==
- Beck, Warren A. and Ynez D. Haase. Historical Atlas of the American West (University of Oklahoma Press, 1989). online
- Brands, H.W. Dreams of El Dorado: A History of the American West ((Basic Books, 2019)
- Deutsch, Sarah. Making a Modern U.S. West: The Contested Terrain of a Region and Its Borders 1898–1940. (U of Nebraska Press, 2022).
- Deverell, William, ed. A Companion to the American West. (Wiley-Blackwell, 2004).
- Etulain, Richard W. Beyond the Missouri: The Story of the American West. (U of New Mexico Press, 2006). online
- Findlay, John M. The Mobilized American West, 1940–2000 (U of Nebraska Press, 2023), comprehensive history online review of this book
- Hine, Robert V., and John Mack Faragher. The American West: A New Interpretive History. (Yale University Press [UP], 2000).
- Lamar, Howard R., ed. The New Encyclopedia of the American West. (Yale UP, 1998). expanded 2nd edition with massive coverage of all aspects by experts
  - Lamar, Howard R., ed. The Reader's Encyclopedia of the American West. (Crowell, 1977); 2400 short articles by 200 experts; online
- Limerick, Patricia. Legacy of Conquest: The Unbroken Past Of The American West (WW Norton, 1987).
- Malone, Michael P., and Richard W. Etulain. The American West: A Twentieth-Century History. (U of Nebraska Press, 1989).
- Milner II, Clyde A. et al. eds. The Oxford History of the American West. (Oxford UP, 1994), long essays by scholars; online
- Milner II, Clyde A. et al. eds. Major Problems in the History of the American West (2nd ed. 1997), excerpts from primary sources and scholarly studies.
- Phillips, C.; Axelrod, A. (1996). Encyclopedia of the American West. Simon & Schuster/Macmillan. ISBN 978-0-02-897497-2.
- Pomeroy, Earl. The Pacific Slope: A History of California, Oregon, Washington, Idaho, Utah, and Nevada. (U of Washington Press, 1973). online
- Utley, Robert M. The Story of The West: A History of the American West and Its People. (Penguin Books, 2003).
- White, Richard. A New History of the American West: 'It's Your Misfortune and None of My Own.' (U of Oklahoma Press, 1991), a major scholarly survey, focused on the post-1890 far west.
- Wishart, David J. Encyclopedia of the Great Plains (U of Nebraska Press, 2004) online
- Wrobel, David M. America's West: A History, 1890–1950 (Cambridge UP, 2017) online

== Culture ==
- Boatright, Mody C. "The Formula in Cowboy Fiction and Drama." Western Folklore (1969): 136–145. in JSTOR
- Davis, David B. "Ten-Gallon Hero." American Quarterly (1954) 6#2 pp: 111–125. in JSTOR
- Day, Kirsten. Cowboy Classics: The Roots of the American Western in the Epic Tradition (Edinburgh UP, 2016).
- Dinan, John A. The Pulp Western: A Popular History of the Western Fiction Magazine in America (Borgo Press, 1983).
- Durham, Philip. "The Cowboy and the Myth Makers." Journal of Popular Culture (1967) 1#1 pp: 58–62.
- Frye, Steven, ed. The Cambridge Companion to Literature of the American West (Cambridge UP, 2016)
- Jones, Daryl (c. 1978). The dime novel western. Bowling Green, Ohio: Popular Press, Bowling Green State University. ISBN 0879720980.
- Lusted, David. The Western. (Pearson/Longman, 2003), on films
- MacDonald, J. Fred. Who Shot the Sheriff?: The Rise and Fall of the Television Western (Praeger, 1987).
- McVeigh, Stephen. The American Western (Edinburgh UP, 2007.)
- Marsden, Michael T. "The Popular Western Novel as a Cultural Artifact." Arizona and the West (1978): 203–214. online
- Rollins, Peter C. and John E. O'Connor, eds. Hollywood's West: The American frontier in film, television and history (UP of Kentucky, 2006) online
- Simmon, Scott. The Invention of the Western Film: A Cultural History of the Genre's First Half Century (Cambridge UP, 2003)
- Witschi, Nicolas S. ed. A Companion to the Literature and Culture of the American West. (2011) excerpt

== Economy ==
- Fite, Gilbert C. The Farmer's Frontier, 1865–1900. (Holt, Rinehart and Winston, 1966).
- Graham, Don. Kings of Texas: The 150-Year Saga of an American Ranching Empire. (John Wiley and Sons, 2003). online
- Nash, Gerald D. A.P. Giannini and the Bank of America. (U of Oklahoma Press, 1992), it was originally based in California
- Nash, Gerald D. The Federal Landscape: An Economic History of the Twentieth-Century West. (U of Arizona Press. 1999). online
- O'Mara, Margaret. The Code: Silicon Valley and the Remaking of America. (Penguin Press, 2019).
- Robbins, William G. Colony and Empire: The Capitalist Transformation of the American West. (U Press of Kansas, 1994).
- Rundell Jr., Walter. Oil in West Texas and New Mexico: A Pictorial History of the Permian Basin. (Texas A & M UP, 1982) online
- Schwantes, Carlos Arnaldo. Going Places: Transportation Redefines the Twentieth-Century West. (Indiana UP, 2003). online
- White, Richard. Railroaded: The Transcontinentals and the Making of Modern America (W.W. Norton, 2011)

== Environment ==
- Abbey, Edward. Desert Solitaire : A Season in the Wilderness. (McGraw-Hill, 1968).
- Brinkley, Douglas. The Wilderness Warrior: Theodore Roosevelt and the Crusade for America (Harper, 2009)
- Castaneda, Christopher J., and Lee M. A. Simpson, eds. River city and valley life: an environmental history of the Sacramento region (U of Pittsburgh Press, 2013) in California; online
- Cawley, R. McGreggor. Federal Land, Western Anger: The Sagebrush Rebellion and Environmental Politics (1993), on conservatives
- Cronon, William. Nature's Metropolis: Chicago and the Great West (W.W. Norton, 1991)
- Cunfer, Geoff, and Bill Waiser, eds. Bison and people on the North American Great Plains: A deep environmental history (Texas A&M University Press, 2016) online.
- Dant, Sara. Losing Eden: An Environmental History of the American West. (U of Nebraska Press, 2023). online, also see online book review
- Dobie, J. Frank. The Longhorns. (Little, Brown, 1941).
- Flores, Dan. The natural west: Environmental history in the Great Plains and Rocky Mountains (U of Oklahoma Press, 2003) online.
- Fradkin, Philip. A River No More: The Colorado River and the West (1981)
- Frehner, Brian, and Kathleen A. Brosnan, eds. The Greater Plains: Rethinking a Region's Environmental Histories (U of Nebraska Press, 2021) online.
- Harvey, Mark W. T. "Echo Park, Glen Canyon, and the postwar wilderness movement." Pacific Historical Review (1991): 43–67. online Colorado River region
- Hollon, W. Eugene. The Great American Desert, Then and Now. (U of Nebraska Press, 1975).
- Huggard, Christopher, and Arthur R. Gómez. Forests under Fire: A Century of Ecosystem Mismanagement in the Southwest. (U of Arizona Press, 2001).
- Hundley Jr., Norris. Water and the West: The Colorado River Compact and the Politics of Water in the American West. (2nd ed. U of California Press, 2009).
- Logan, Michael F. Desert Cities: The Environmental History of Phoenix and Tucson. (U of Pittsburgh Press, 2006).
- Lowitt, Richard. The New Deal and the West (Indiana UP, 1984) online
- Pisani, Donald J. Water, Land, and Law in the West: The Limits of Public Policy, 1850-1920. (UP of Kansas, 1996).
- Reisner, Marc. Cadillac desert: The American West and its disappearing water (Penguin, 1993) says the villain was the federal Bureau of Reclamation see; also see online copy.
- Stegner, Wallace. The American West As Living Space. (U of Michigan Press, 1987).
- Sturgeon, Stephen Craig. The politics of western water: the congressional career of Wayne Aspinall (U of Arizona Press, 2002).
- Vogel, David. California greenin': How the Golden State became an environmental leader (Princeton UP, 2019).
- White, Richard. The Organic Machine: The Remaking of the Columbia River. (Hill and Wang, 1995).
- Wild, Peter. Pioneer Conservationists of Western America (1979) online
- Worster, Donald. Under Western Skies: Nature and History in the American West (Oxford UP, 1992) online
- Worster, Donald. Dust Bowl: The Southern Plains in the 1930s. (Oxford UP, 1979).
- Worster, Donald. Rivers of Empire: Water, Aridity, and the Growth of the American West. (Pantheon Books, 1987).

== Frontier ==
- Billington, Ray Allen and Martin Ridge. Westward Expansion: A History of the American Frontier. Abridged ed. (U of New Mexico Press, 2001). online
- Billington, Ray Allen. The Far Western Frontier, 1830–1860. (Harper and Row, 1959)
- Davis, William C. The American Frontier: Pioneers, Settlers, & Cowboys, 1800–1899. (U of Oklahoma Press, 1999). online
- Hawgood, John A. America's Western Frontiers: The Exploration and Settlement of the Trans-Mississippi West. (Knopf, 1969).
- Hyde, Anne F. Empires, Nations, and Families: A History of the North American West, 1800–1860. (U of Nebraska Press, 2011).
- Paxson, Frederic Logan. History of the American frontier, 1763–1893. (Houghton Mifflin, 1924); An old survey by leading authority; Pulitzer Prize. online
- Paxson, Frederic Logan. The Last American Frontier. (Macmillan, 1910). online
- Turner, Frederick Jackson. The Frontier in American History. (Holt, 1920)
- West, Elliott. Continental Reckoning: The American West in the Age of Expansion. (U of Nebraska Press, 2023). online

== Gender and race ==
- Allmendinger, Blake. Imagining the African American West (U of Nebraska Press, 2005). online
- Bernardin, Susan, ed. The Routledge Companion to Gender and the American West (2022) excerpt
- Cronon, William, et al. “Women and the West: Rethinking the Western History Survey Course.” Western Historical Quarterly 17#3 (1986), pp. 269–90 online
- Farrington, Brenda Gail, and Gordon Morris Bakken, eds. Encyclopedia of Women in the American West (SAGE, 2003)
- Frye, Steven, ed. The Cambridge Companion to Literature of the American West (Cambridge UP, 2016) chapters 11-15 cover Native American; Chicana/o; Asian American; and African American topics.
- Gutierrez, David G. et al. "Significant to Whom?: Mexican Americans and the History of the American West" in A New Significance: Re-Envisioning the History of the American West ed. by Clyde A. Milner. (1996) pp.67-105.
- Johnson, Michael K. Hoo-Doo cowboys and bronze buckaroos: Conceptions of the African American West (UP of Mississippi, 2014), focus on popular culture; online.
- Ling, Huping, and Allan W. Austin. Asian American History and Culture: An Encyclopedia (Routledge, 2015) contents.
- Meier, Matt S., and Margo Gutiérrez. The Mexican American experience: an encyclopedia (Greenwood, 2003). online
- Okihiro, Gary Y. ed. The Columbia Guide to Asian American History (Columbia UP, 2001) online
- Stauffer, Helen Winter, and Susan J. Rosowski, eds. Women and western American literature (Whitston, 1982)
- White, Richard. "Race relations in the American West." American Quarterly 38.3 (1986): 396-416. online
- Zhao, Xiaojian and Edward J.W. Park, eds. Asian Americans: An Encyclopedia of Social, Cultural, Economic, and Political History (3 vol. Greenwood, 2013)

== Historiography ==
- August, Jack L. "The Future of Western History: The Third Wave.” Journal of Arizona History 27#2 (1986), pp. 229–44. online
- Billington, Ray Allen. America's Frontier Heritage. (U of New Mexico Press, 1984). online
- Cronon, William, George A. Miles, and Jay Gitlin, eds. Under an open sky: rethinking America's Western past (WW Norton & Company, 1993) 14 topical essays by experts.
- Etulain, Richard W. Telling Western Stories: From Buffalo Bill to Larry McMurtry. (U of New Mexico Press, 1999).
- Etulain, Richard W. The American West and Its Interpreters. (U of New Mexico Press, 2023).
- Etulain, Richard W. Writing Western History: Essays On Major Western Historians (U of Nevada Press, 2002).
- Faragher, John Mack, ed. Rereading Frederick Jackson Turner: The Significance of the Frontier in American History and Other Essays. (Holt, 1994).
- Frantz, Joe B. Aspects of the American West: Three Essays. (Texas A&M UP, 1976).
- Gressley, Gene. "Whither Western American History? Speculations on a Direction," Pacific Historical Review 53, no. 4 (1984): 483–501.
- Malone, Michael P. "Beyond the Last Frontier: Toward a New Approach to Western American History." The Western Historical Quarterly 20, no. 4 (1989): 409–27.
- Malone, Michael P., ed. Historians and the American West. (U of Nebraska Press, 1983)
- Milner, Clyde A. ed. A New Significance: Re-Envisioning the History of the American West () 15 essays by experts
- Nash, Gerald D. Creating the West: Historical Interpretations, 1890–1990. (U of New Mexico Press, 1991).
- Nash, Gerald D., and Richard W. Etulain. The Twentieth-Century West: Historical Interpretations. (U of New Mexico Press, 1989).
- Norris Jr., Hundley, and John A. Schutz, ed. The American West: Frontier and Region--Interpretations by John Walton Caughey. (Ward Ritchie Press, 1969).
- Pomeroy, Earl. "Toward a Reorientation of Western History: Continuity and Environment." Mississippi Valley Historical Review 41#4 (1955): 579–600. online
- Rensink, Brenden W., ed. The North American West in the Twenty-First Century.(U of Nebraska Press, 2022.
- Ridge, Martin. "The Life of an Idea: The Significance of Frederick Jackson Turner’s Frontier Thesis." Montana: The Magazine of Western History 41, no. 1 (1991): 2–13.
- Sonnichsen, C. L. The Ambidextrous Historian: Historical Writers and Writing in the American West. (U of Oklahoma Press, 1981).
- Stegner, Wallace and Richard W. Etulain. Stegner: Conversations on History and Literature. (U of Utah Press, 1983).
- Turner, Frederick Jackson. The Frontier in American History. (Holt, 1920)

== Labor ==
- Andrews, Thomas G. Killing for Coal: America’s Deadliest Labor War. Cambridge, MA: Harvard University Press, 2008.
- Brykit, James W. Forging the Copper Collar: Arizona's Labor-Management War of 1901-1921. Tucson, University of Arizona Press, 1982.
- Lukas, J. Anthony. Big Trouble: A Murder in a Small Western Town Sets Off a Struggle for the Soul of America. New York: Simon and Schuster, 1997.
- Schwantes, Carlos Arnaldo. Radical Heritage: Labor, Socialism, and Reform in Washington and British Columbia, 1885-1917. Seattle: University of Washington Press, 1979.

== Military history ==
- Amundson, Michael A. Yellowcake Towns : Uranium Mining Communities in the American West. Boulder: University Press of Colorado, 2002.
- Bolton, Roger E. Defense Purchases and Regional Growth. Washington, D.C. 1966.
- Brilliant, Mark and David M. Kennedy, eds. World War II and the West It Wrought. Redwood City, CA: Stanford University Press. 2020. excerpt
- Clayton, James L. "Impact of the Cold War on the Economies of California and Utah." Pacific Historical Review, 36 (1967): 449–473.
- Fernlund, Kevin J. The Cold War American West, 1945 to 1989. Albuquerque: University of New Mexico Press, 1998.
- Findlay, John M. and Hevley, Bruce W. Atomic Frontier Days : Hanford and the American West. Center for the Study of the Pacific Northwest in Association with Seattle: University of Washington Press, 2011.
- Findlay, John M. The Mobilized American West, 1940–2000. Lincoln: University of Nebraska Press, 2023.
- Heefner, Gretchen. The Missile Next Door: The Minuteman in the American Heartland. Cambridge, MA: Harvard University Press, 2012.
- Hevly, Bruce W. and John M. Findlay, ed. The Atomic West. Seattle: University of Washington Press, 1998.
- Hull, McAllister, with Amy Bianco. Rider of the Pale Horse: A Memoir of Los Alamos and Beyond. Albuquerque: University of New Mexico Press, 2005.
- Hunner, Jon. J. Robert Oppenheimer, the Cold War, and the Atomic West. Norman: University of Oklahoma Press, 2009.
- Larson, T.A. Wyoming's War Years, 1941–1945. Laramie: University of Wyoming, 1954.
- Lotchin, Roger. Japanese American Relocation in World War II: A Reconsideration. Cambridge, UK: Cambridge University Press, 2018.
- Lotchin, Roger W. "The Metropolitan-Military Complex in Comparative Perspective: San Francisco, Los Angeles, and San Diego, 1919–1941." Journal of the West, 20 (July 1979): 19–30.
- Martini, Edwin A. Proving Grounds: Militarized Landscapes, Weapons Testing, and the Environmental Impact of U.S. Bases. Seattle: University of Washington Press, 2015.
- Nash, Gerald D. The American West Transformed: The Impact of the Second World War. Bloomington: Indiana University Press, 1985.
- Nash, Gerald D. World War II and the West: Reshaping the Economy. Lincoln: University of Nebraska Press. 1990.
- Rosier, Paul C. "'They Are Ancestral Homelands': Race, Place, and Politics in Cold War Native America, 1945-1961." The Journal of American History 92, no. 4 (2006): 1300–26.
- Szasz, Ferenc Morton. The Day the Sun Rose Twice: The Story of the Trinity Site Nuclear Explosion, July 16, 1945. Albuquerque: University of New Mexico Press, 1984.

== Mythic West ==
- Athearn, Robert G.The Mythic West in Twentieth-Century America. (UP of Kansas, 1986).
- Etulain, Richard W. Re-Imagining the Modern American West: A Century of Fiction, History, and Art. (U of Arizona Press. 1996).
- Gibson, Arrell M. The Santa Fe and Taos Colonies: Age of the Muses, 1900–1942. (U of New Mexico Press, 1988).
- Lehan, Richard. Quest West: American Intellectual and Cultural Transformations. (Louisiana State UP, 2014).
- Savage Jr., William W. The Cowboy Hero: His Image in American History and Culture. (U of Oklahoma Press, 1979).
- Slotkin, Richard. Regeneration through violence: The mythology of the American frontier, 1600-1860 (U of Oklahoma Press, 1973) online.
- Slotkin, Richard. The fatal environment: The myth of the frontier in the age of industrialization, 1800-1890 (U of Oklahoma Press, 1985) online.
- Slotkin, Richard. Gunfighter nation: The myth of the frontier in twentieth-century America (U of Oklahoma Press, 1992). online; also see online review of this book
- Smith, Henry Nash. Virgin Land: The American West as Symbol and Myth (Harvard UP, 1950).

== Native Americans ==
- Brown, Dee. Bury My Heart at Wounded Knee: An Indian History of the American West. (Holt, Rinehart and Winston, 1970).
- Debo, Angie. And Still the Waters Run: The Betrayal of the Five Civilized Tribes. (Princeton UP, 1968).
- Deloria Jr. Vine, and Clifford M. Lytle. American Indians, American Justice. Austin: University of Texas Press, 1983.
- Iverson, Peter. When Indians Became Cowboys: Native Peoples and Cattle Ranching in the American West. (U of Oklahoma Press, 1994).
- Miles, George. "To Hear and Old Voice: Rediscovering Native Americans in American History.” in William Cronon et al. eds. Under an Open Sky: Rethinking America's Western Past (1992) pp.52–70.
- Parman, Donald Lee. Indians and the American West in the Twentieth Century.(Indiana UP, 1994).

== Politics ==
- Danbom, David B. Bridging the Distance: Common Issues of the Rural West. ( U of Utah Press, 2015).
- Everett, Derek R. (2014). Creating the American West: Boundaries and Borderlands. Norman: University of Oklahoma Press. ISBN 978-0-8061-4614-0.
- Fernlund, Kevin J. Lyndon B. Johnson and Modern America. (Norman: University of Oklahoma Press, 2009).
- Iverson, Peter. Barry Goldwater: Native Arizonan. (U of Oklahoma Press, 1997).
- Lowitt, Richard. The New Deal and the West. (Indiana UP, 1984) online
- Rothman, Hal K. LBJ's Texas White House: 'Our Heart's Home.' (Texas A&M UP, 2001).
- Smith, Thomas G. Stewart L. Udall: Steward of the Land. ( U of New Mexico Press, 2017).
- Stratton, David H. Tempest Over Teapot Dome: The Story of Albert B. Fall. (U of Oklahoma Press, 1998).
- Young, Nancy Beck. Two Suns of the Southwest: Lyndon Johnson, Barry Goldwater, and the 1964 Battle between Liberalism and Conservatism. (UP of Kansas, 2019).

== Religion ==
- Avella, Steven M. "Catholicism in the Twentieth-Century American West: The Next Frontier." The Catholic Historical Review 97, no. 2 (2011): 219–49.
- Botham, Fay, and Sara M. Patterson, eds. Race, Religion, Region: Landscapes of Encounter in the American West (U of Arizona Press, 2006).
- Kerstetter, Todd M. Inspiration and Innovation: Religion in the American West (John Wiley & Sons, 2015). online
- Killen, Patricia O'Connell, and Mark Silk, eds. Religion and public life in the Pacific Northwest: The none zone (Rowman Altamira, 2004).
- Prince, Gregory A. Leonard Arrington and the Writing of Mormon History. (U of Utah Press, 2016).
- Quinn, D. Michael. "Religion in the American West" in William Cronon, et al. eds. Under an open sky: rethinking America's Western past (1993) pp. 145–166.
- Roof, Wade Clark. "Pluralism as a culture: Religion and civility in Southern California." The ANNALS of the American Academy of Political and Social Science 612.1 (2007): 82-99.
- Szasz, Ferenc Morton. Religion in the modern American West (U of Arizona Press, 2002).
- Szasz, Ferenc Morton. The Protestant Clergy in the Great Plains and Mountain West, 1865-1915 (U of Nebraska Press, 2004). online
- Weiser-Alexander, Kathy. "Mormons in the American West" Legends of America (2024) online

== Tourism ==
- Barber, Alicia. Reno’s Big Gamble: Image and Reputation in the Biggest Little City. (UP of Kansas. 2008).
- Cottam, Erica. Hubbell Trading Post: Trade, Tourism, and the Navajo Southwest. (U of Oklahoma Press, 2015).
- Pomeroy, Earl. In Search of the Golden West: The Tourist in Western America. (Knopf, 1957).
- Rothman, Hal K. Devil's Bargains: Tourism and the Twentieth-Century American West. (U of Kansas Press, 1998.
- Rugh, Susan Sessions. "Branding Utah: Industrial Tourism in the Postwar American West." Western Historical Quarterly 37#4 (2006): 445–472.
- Wrobel, David. Promised Lands: Promotion, Memory, and the Creation of the American West. (UP of Kansas, 2002.

== Urban West ==
- Abbott, Carl (2008). How Cities Won the West: Four Centuries of Urban Change in Western North America. Albuquerque: University of New Mexico Press. ISBN 978-0-8263-3312-4.
- Cline, Platt. Mountain Town: Flagstaff's First Century. (Flagstaff, Northland Publishing, 1994).
- Findlay, John M. Magic Lands: Western Cityscapes and American Culture After 1940. (U of California Press, 1992).
- Gómez, Arthur R. Quest for the Golden Circle: The Four Corners and the Metropolitan West, 1945-1970. (UP of New Mexico, 1994).
- Leonard, Stephen J., and Thomas J. Noel. Denver: Mining Camp to Metropolis. (UP of Colorado, 1990).
- Luckingham, Bradford. The Urban Southwest: A Profile History of Albuquerque, El Paso, Phoenix, and Tucson. (Texas Western Press, 1982).
- Nash, Gerald D. The American West in the Twentieth Century – A Short History of an Urban Oasis. (Prentice Hall, 1973).
- Rothman, Hal. Neon Metropolis: How Las Vegas Started the Twenty-First Century. (Routledge, 2003).
- Sonnichsen, C.L. Tucson: The Life and Times of an American City. (U of Oklahoma Press, 1982).
- Stratten, David H., ed. Spokane and the Inland Empire: An Interior Pacific Northwest Anthology. (2nd ed. Washington State UP, 2007).
- VanderMeer, Philip. Desert Visions and the Making of Phoenix, 1860–2009 (2010)
- Wiley, Peter; Gottlieb, Robert (1985). Empires in the Sun: The Rise of the New American West. Tucson: University of Arizona Press. ISBN 978-0816509119.
- Wilson, Chris. The Myth of Santa Fe: Creating a Modern Regional Tradition. (U of New Mexico Press, 1997).
