= Bibliography of the American frontier =

This is an English language bibliography of scholarly books and articles on the American frontier. It is a selection from tens of thousands of titles. See also: Bibliography of the Western United States

The American frontier, also known as the "Old West", popularly known as the "Wild West", encompasses the geography, history, folklore, and culture associated with the forward wave of American expansion in mainland North America that began with European colonial settlements in the early 17th century and ended with the admission of the last few contiguous western territories as states in 1912.

== Surveys ==
- Billington, Ray Allen and Martin Ridge. Westward Expansion: A History of the American Frontier. Abridged ed. Albuquerque: University of New Mexico Press, 2001.
- Billington, Ray Allen. The Far Western Frontier, 1830–1860. New York: Harper and Row, 1959.
- Brands, H. W. (2019). Dreams of El Dorado: A History of the American West. Basic Books. ISBN 978-1541672529.
- Buley, R. Carlyle. The Old Northwest : Pioneer Period, 1815-1840 (2 vol, Indiana Historical Society, 1950). a major history of Ohio, Indiana, Illinois, Michigan and Wisconsin; Pulitzer Prize. vol 1 online; see also vol 2 online
- Davis, William C. The American Frontier: Pioneers, Settlers, & Cowboys, 1800–1899. University of Oklahoma Press, 1999. online
- Deverell, William, ed. A Companion to the American West. Hoboken, NJ: Wiley-Blackwell, 2004.
- DeVoto, Bernard. The Year of Decision: 1846. New York: Truman Talley Books, St. Martin's Griffin, 1942, 1943.
- Etulain, Richard W. Beyond the Missouri: The Story of the American West. Albuquerque: University of New Mexico Press, 2006.
- Fernlund, Kevin Jon. A Big History of North America, from Montezuma to Monroe. Columbia: University of Missouri Press, 2022.
- Fite, Gilbert C. The Farmer's Frontier, 1865–1900. New York: Holt, Rinehart and Winston, 1966.
- Hawgood, John A. America's Western Frontiers: The Exploration and Settlement of the Trans-Mississippi West. New York: Knopf, 1969.
- Hine, Robert V., and John Mack Faragher. The American West: A New Interpretive History. New Haven, CT: Yale University Press, 2000.
- Hyde, Anne F. Empires, Nations, and Families: A History of the North American West, 1800–1860. Lincoln: University of Nebraska Press, 2011.
- Josephy Jr., Alvin M. The American Heritage Book of the Pioneer Spirit. New York, American Heritage, 1959.
- Lamar, Howard R., ed. The New Encyclopedia of the American West. New Haven: Yale University Press, 1998.
- Lamar, Howard R., ed. The Reader's Encyclopedia of the American West. Crowell, 1977. online
- McLoughlin, Denis. Wild and Woolly: An Encyclopedia of the Old West. Doubleday, 1975; UK edition The Encyclopedia of the Old West. Routledge, 1977.
- Milner, Clyde, Carol O'Connor, and Martha Sandweiss, eds. The Oxford History of the American West. New York: Oxford University Press, 1994; long essays by scholars; online
- Nugent, Walter. Habits of Empire: A History of American Expansion. New York: Knopf, 2008.
- Otto, John Solomon. The Southern Frontiers, 1607–1860: The Agricultural Evolution of the Colonial and Antebellum South. Westport, CT: Praeger, 1989.
- Paxson, Frederic Logan. History of the American frontier, 1763–1893. Boston: Houghton Mifflin, 1924. An old survey by leading authority; Pulitzer Prize. online
- Paxson, Frederic Logan. The Last American Frontier. New York: Macmillan, 1910. online
- Pomeroy, Earl. The Pacific Slope: A History of California, Oregon, Washington, Idaho, Utah, and Nevada. Seattle: University of Washington Press, 1973. online
- Robinson, W. Stitt. The Southern Colonial Frontier, 1607–1763 (Albuquerque: University of New Mexico Press, 1979)
- Roosevelt, Theodore. The Winning of the West (5 volumes). New York: Putnam, 1889–1896.
- Snodgrass, Mary Ellen, ed. Settlers of the American West: The Lives of 231 Notable Pioneers. Jefferson, NC: McFarland & Company, 2015. ISBN 978-0786497355
- Turner, Frederick Jackson. The Frontier in American History. New York: Holt, 1920
- Utley, Robert M. The Story of The West: A History of the American West and Its People. New York: Penguin Books, 2003.
- Webb, Walter Prescott. The Great Frontier. Boston: Houghton Mifflin, 1952.
- West, Elliott. Continental Reckoning: The American West in the Age of Expansion. Lincoln: University of Nebraska Press, 2023; Pulitzer Prize finalist.
- White, Richard. 'It's Your Misfortune and None of My Own:' A New History of the American West. Norman: University of Oklahoma Press, 1993; textbook focused on the post-1890 far west.

== Business and trade ==
- Athearn, Robert G. Forts of the Upper Missouri. Hoboken, NJ: Prentice-Hall, 1967.
- Atherton, Lewis. The Cattle Kings: Legendary Ranchers of the Old West. Reprint, Bloomington: Indiana University Press, 2019.
- Barbour, Barton. Fort Union and the Upper Missouri Fur Trade. Norman: University of Oklahoma Press, 2002.
- Chittenden, Hiram Martin. The American Fur Trade of the Far West: A History of Pioneer Trading Posts & Early Fur Companies of the Missouri Valley & Rocky Mountains & of the Overland Commerce with Santa Fe (2 volumes). New York: Press of the Pioneers. 1935.
- Chrisler, Phillips Paul, with J.W. Smurr. The Fur Trade (2 volumes). Norman: University of Oklahoma Press, 1961.
- Dolin, Eric Jay. Fur, Fortune, and Empire: The Epic History of the Fur Trade in America. New York: Norton, 2010.
- Enzler, Jerry. Jim Bridger: Trailblazer of the American West. Norman: University of Oklahoma Press, 2021.
- MacLaren, Andrew C., Mark E. Young, and Sean Lochrie. "Enterprise in the American West: Taverns, Inns and Settlement Development on the Frontier during the 1800s." International Journal of Contemporary Hospitality Management 25, no.2 (2013): 264–281. online
- Miller, Michael M. XIT: A Story of Land, Cattle, and Capital In Texas and Montana. Norman: University of Oklahoma Press, 2023.
- Murtazashvili, Ilia. The Political Economy of the American Frontier. Cambridge, UK: Cambridge University Press, 2013.
- Weber, David J. The Taos Trappers: The Fur Trade from New Mexico, 1540–1846. Albuquerque: University of New Mexico Press, 1967.
- Winther, Oscar Osburn. The Old Oregon Country: A History of Frontier Trade, Transportation, and Travel. Lincoln: University of Nebraska Press, 1950. online.

== Environment, flora and fauna ==
- Cronon, William. Changes in the Land: Indians, Colonists, and the Ecology of New England. New York: Hill and Wang, 2003.
- Cronon, William. "Telling Tales on Canvas: Landscapes of Frontier Change," in Discovered Lands, Invented Pasts: Transforming Visions of the American West, ed. by Jules David Prown, Nancy K. Anderson, and William Cronon. New Haven: Yale University Press, 1992.
- Crosby, Alfred W. Ecological Imperialism: The Biological Expansion of Europe, 900–1900. Cambridge: UK: Cambridge University Press, 1986.
- Dant, Sara. Losing Eden: An Environmental History of the American West. Lincoln: University of Nebraska Press, 2023. online, also see online book review
- Dobie, J. Frank. The Longhorns. Boston: Little, Brown, 1941.
- Dobie, J. Frank. The Mustangs. Boston: Little, Brown, 1952.
- Dobie. J. Frank. The Voice of the Coyote. Boston: Little, Brown, 1949.
- Flores, Dan. "Bison Ecology and Bison Diplomacy: The Southern Plains from 1800 to 1850." Journal of American History 78 (1991): 465–485.
- Flores, Dan. Coyote America: A Natural and Supernatural History. New York: Basic Books, 2016.
- Flores, Dan. Wild New World: The Epic Story of Animals and People in America. New York: Norton, 2022.
- Isenberg, Andrew C. The Destruction of the Bison: An Environmental History, 1750–1920. Cambridge, UK: Cambridge University Press, 2001.
- Malin, James C. Grassland of North America: Prolegomena to Its History. 1961. online
- Malin, James C. Winter Wheat in the Golden Belt of Kansas: A Study in Adaptation to Sub-Humid Geographical Environment. Lawrence: University of Kansas Press, 1944. online
- Taschereau Mamers, Danielle. "‘Last of the Buffalo:’ Bison Extermination, Early Conservation, and Visual Records of Settler Colonization in the North American west." Settler Colonial Studies, 10, no.1 (2020): 126–147.
- Worster, Donald. Rivers of Empire: Water, Aridity, and the Growth of the American West. New York: Pantheon Books, 1987.

== Exploration ==
- Baker, J. N. L. A History of Geographical Discovery and Exploration. Rev. ed. New York: Cooper Square Publishers, 1967.
- Bartlett, Richard W. Great Surveys of the American West. Norman: University of Oklahoma Press, 1980.
- Bitterli, Urs. Cultures in Conflict: Encounters Between European and Non-European Cultures, 1492–1800. Translated by Ritchie Robertson. Stanford, CA: Stanford University Press, 1989.
- Bough, Barry M. First Across the Continent: Sir Alexander Mackenzie. Norman: University of Oklahoma Press, 1997.
- Brown, Lloyd A. The Story of Maps. New York: Dover Publications, 1979.
- Chaffin, Tom. Pathfinder: John Charles Fremont and the Course of American Empire. Norman: University of Oklahoma Press, 2014.
- de Terra, Helmut. Humboldt: The Life and Times of Alexander von Humboldt, 1769–1859. New York: Octagon Books, 1979.
- DeVoto, Bernard. The Course of Empire. Boston: Houghton Mifflin, 1952.
- Engstrand, Iris H.W. Spanish Scientists in the New World: The Eighteenth-Century Expeditions. Seattle: University of Washington Press, 1981.
- Fernández-Armesto, Felipe, ed. The Times Atlas of World Exploration: 3,000 Years of Exploring, Explorers, and Mapmaking. New York: Times Books, 1991.
- Fernlund, Kevin J. William Henry Holmes and the Rediscovery of the American West. Albuquerque: University of New Mexico Press, 2000.
- Ford, Corey. Where the Sea Breaks its Back: The Epic Story of Early Naturalist Georg Steller and the Russian Exploration of Alaska, Boston: Little, Brown, 1966.
- Goetzmann, William H. Army Exploration in the American West, 1803–1863. New Haven: Yale University Press, 1959.
- Goetzmann, William H. Exploration and Empire: The Explorer and the Scientist in the Winning of the American West. New York: Alfred A. Knopf, 1967.
- Goetzmann, William H. New Lands, New Men: America and the Second Great Age of Discovery. New York: Viking Press, 1986.
- Goetzmann, William H. "Exploration's Nation: The Role of Discovery in American History," in American Civilization, ed. Daniel J. Boorstin. New York: McGraw-Hill, 1972.
- Mann, Charles C. 1493: Uncovering the New World Columbus Created. New York: Alfred A. Knopf, 2011.
- McPherson, Robert S., and Susan Rhoades Neel. Mapping the Four Corners: Narrating the Hayden Survey of 1875. Norman: University of Oklahoma Press, 2016.
- Nichols, Roger L., and Patrick L. Halley. Stephen Long and American Frontier Exploration. Newark: University of Delaware Press, 1980.
- Pyne, Stephen J. Grove Karl Gilbert: A Great Engine of Research. Austin: University of Texas Press, 1980.
- Pyne, Stephen J. How the Canyon Became Grand: A Short History. New York: Viking, 1998.
- Ronda, James P. Finding the West: Explorations with Lewis and Clark. Norman: University of Oklahoma Press. 2001.
- Ross, John F. The Promise of the Grand Canyon: John Wesley Powell's Perilous Journey and His Vision for the American West. New York: Viking, 2018.
- Savage, Jr., Henry. Discovering America, 1700–1875. New York: HarperCollins, 1979. online
- Stegner, Wallace. Beyond the Hundredth Meridian: John Wesley Powell and the Second Opening of the West. Boston: Houghton Mifflin and Company, 1953.
- Weber, David J. Richard H. Kern: Expeditionary Artist in the Far Southwest, 1848–1853. Fort Worth: Amon Carter Museum, 1985.
- Williams, Glyndwr and William H. Goetzmann. The Atlas of North American Exploration: From the Norse Voyages to the Race to the Pole. Hoboken, NJ: Prentice Hall, 1992.

== Frontier justice ==
- Ball, Larry D. Desert Lawmen: The High Sheriffs of New Mexico and Arizona, 1846–1912. Albuquerque: University of New Mexico, 1992.
- Ball, Larry D. The United States Marshals of New Mexico and Arizona Territories, 1846–1912. Albuquerque: University of New Mexico, 1982.
- Broadhead, Michael J. Isaac C. Parker: Federal Justice on the Frontier. Norman: University of Oklahoma Press, 2003.
- Brown, Richard Maxwell. No Duty to Retreat: Violence and Values in American History and Society. Norman: University of Oklahoma Press, 1994.
- Brown, Richard Maxwell. Strain of Violence: Historical Studies of American Violence and Vigilantism. New York: Oxford University Press, 1975.
- Etulain, Richard W., and Glenda Riley. With Badges and Bullets: Lawmen and Outlaws in the Old West. Chicago: Chicago Review Press, 1999.
- Hogan, Richard. "The Frontier as Social Control." Theory and Society 14, no. 1 (1985): 35–51. online
- Hollon, W. Eugene. Frontier Violence: Another Look. New York: Oxford University Press, 1974.
- Isenberg, Andrew C. Wyatt Earp: A Vigilante Life. New York: Hill and Wang, 2013.
- Johnson, David A. "Vigilance and the Law: The Moral Authority of Popular Justice in the Far West." American Quarterly 33 (1981): 558–86.
- Utley, Robert M. High Noon in Lincoln: Violence on the Western Frontier. Albuquerque: University of New Mexico Press, 1987.

== Government and politics ==
- Bakken, Gordon Morris. Rocky Mountain Constitution Making, 1850–1912. West Port, CT: Praeger, 1987.
- Bakken, Gordon Morris. The Development of Law on the Rocky Mountain Frontier: Civil Law and Society, 1850–1912. Westport, CT: Greenwood, 1983. online
- Johannsen, Robert W. Frontier Politics on the Eve of the Civil War (1955); covers Oregon and Washington. online
- Lamar, Howard R. Dakota Territory 1861–1889: A Study of Frontier Politics. New Haven: Yale University Press. 1956. online
- Lamar, Howard R. The Far Southwest, 1846–1912. New Haven: Yale University Press, 1966. online
- Pomeroy, Earl. The Territories and the United States, 1861–1890: Studies in Colonial Administration. Philadelphia: University of Pennsylvania Press, 1947.
- Spero, Patrick. Frontier Country: The Politics of War in Early Pennsylvania (University of Pennsylvania Press, 2016).
- Utter, William T. "Saint Tammany in Ohio: A Study in Frontier Politics." Mississippi Valley Historical Review 15.3 (1928): 321–340. online

== Great Plains ==
- Athearn, Robert G. High Country Empire: The High Plains and the Rockies. New York: McGraw-Hill. 1960.
- Baird, David W., and Danny Goble. The Story of Oklahoma. Rev. 2nd ed. Norman: University of Oklahoma Press, 2013.
- Blouet, Brian W., and Frederick C. Luebke. The Great Plains: Environment and Culture. Lincoln: University of Nebraska Press, 1979.
- Frazier, Ian. Great Plains. New York: Macmillan, 1989.
- Gates, Paul W. "Homesteading in the High Plains". Agricultural History (1977): 109–133. in JSTOR
- Keyes, Sarah. American Burial Ground: A New History of the Overland Trail. Philadelphia: University of Pennsylvania Press, 2023.
- Kraenzel, Carl Frederick. The Great Plains in Transition. Norman: University of Oklahoma Press, 1955.
- Lauck, Jon K., John E. Miller, and Paula M. Nelson, eds. The Plains Political Tradition: Essays on South Dakota Political Culture. Pierre: South Dakota Historical Society Press, 2018.
- Miner, Craig. West of Wichita: Settling the High Plains of Kansas, 1865–1890. Lawrence: University Press of Kansas, 1986.
- Miner, H. Craig, and William E. Unrau. The End of Indian Kansas: A Study of Cultural Revolution, 1854–1871. Lawrence: University Press of Kansas, 1978.
- Paul, Rodman. The Far West and the Great Plains in Transition, 1859–1900. New York: Harper and Row, 1988.
- Robinson, Elwyn. History of North Dakota. Lincoln: University of Nebraska Press, 1966.
- Unruh, John David. The Plains Across: The Overland Emigrants and the Trans-Mississippi West, 1840–1860. Urbana: University of Illinois Press, 1979.
- Webb, Walter Prescott. The Great Plains. Boston: Ginn. 1931.
- Wishart, David J., ed. (2004). Encyclopedia of the Great Plains. Lincoln: University of Nebraska Press. ISBN 0803247877.

== Historiography ==
- Full text of all articles in Western Historical Quarterly, 1972 to present
- Great Plains Quarterly Table of contents, 1981 to present Archived 2023-05-05 at the Wayback Machine; 2014 to present online articles
- Billington, Ray Allen and Martin Ridge. Westward Expansion: A History of the American Frontier 5th ed. New York: Macmillan 1982. Highly detailed bibliography, pp. 699–858.
- Billington, Ray Allen. America's Frontier Heritage. Albuquerque, University of New Mexico Press, 1984; a favorable analysis of Turner's theories about social sciences and historiography online
- Caughey, John Walton. Hubert Howe Bancroft: Historian of the West. Berkeley, CA: University of California Press, 1946.
- Etulain, Richard W., "Clio's Disciples on the Rio Grande: Western History at the University of New Mexico", New Mexico Historical Review 87 (Summer 2012): 277–298.
- Etulain, Richard W. Telling Western Stories: From Buffalo Bill to Larry McMurtry. Albuquerque: University of New Mexico Press, 1999.
- Etulain, Richard W. The American West and Its Interpreters. Albuquerque: University of New Mexico Press, 2023.
- Etulain, Richard W., ed. (2002). Writing Western History: Essays On Major Western Historians. Reno: University of Nevada Press. ISBN 978-0874175172.
- Faragher, John Mack, ed. Rereading Frederick Jackson Turner: The Significance of the Frontier in American History and Other Essays. New York: Holt, 1994.
- Fernlund, Kevin Jon. "American Exceptionalism or Atlantic Unity? Frederick Jackson Turner and the Enduring Problem of American Historiography." New Mexico Historical Review, 89, no. 3 (Summer 2014): 359–399. online
- Furstenberg, François. "The Significance of the Trans-Appalachian Frontier in Atlantic History." The American Historical Review 113, no. 3 (2008): 647–77.
- Gressley, Gene. "Whither Western American History? Speculations on a Direction," Pacific Historical Review 53, no. 4 (1984): 483–501.
- Hurtado, Albert L., "Bolton and Turner: The Borderlands and American Exceptionalism." Western Historical Quarterly 44, no.1 (Spring 2013): 5–20.
- Limerick, Patricia Nelson. The Legacy of Conquest: The Unbroken Past of the American West. New York: Norton, 1987.
- Malone, Michael P., ed. Historians and the American West. Lincoln: University of Nebraska Press, 1983.
- Nash, Gerald D. Creating the West: Historical Interpretations, 1890–1990. Albuquerque: University of New Mexico Press, 1991.
- Nichols, Roger L., ed. American Frontier and Western Issues: A Historiographical Review. Westport, CT: Greenwood Press, 1986.
- Norris Jr., Hundley, and John A. Schutz, eds. The American West: Frontier and Region—Interpretations by John Walton Caughey. Los Angeles, CA: Ward Ritchie Press, 1969.
- Pomeroy, Earl. "Toward a Reorientation of Western History: Continuity and Environment." The Mississippi Valley Historical Review 41, no. 4 (1955): 579–600. Toward a Reorientation of Western History: Continuity and Environment.
- Prince, Gregory A. Leonard Arrington and the Writing of Mormon History. Salt Lake City: University of Utah Press, 2016.
- Spackman, S. G. F. "The Frontier and Reform in the United States." Historical Journal 13, no. 2 (1970): 333–339. online.
- Stegner, Wallace and Richard W. Etulain. Stegner: Conversations on History and Literature. Salt Lake City: University of Utah Press, 1983.
- Weber, David J. "The Spanish Borderlands, Historiography Redux." The History Teacher, 39, no. 1 (2005): 43–56. online.
- Williams, William Appleman. "The Frontier Thesis and American Foreign Policy." Pacific Historical Review 24, no.4 (1955): 379–395. online
- Witschi, Nicolas S., ed. (2011). A Companion to the Literature and Culture of the American West. Hoboken, NJ: John Wiley & Sons. ISBN 978-1444396577.; focus on fiction and literary criticism.

== Images and memory ==
- Babcock, C. Merton. "The Social Significance of the Language of the American Frontier." American Speech 24, no. 4 (1949): 256-263 online.
- Billington, Ray Allen. Land of Savagery, Land of Promise: The European Image of the American Frontier in the Nineteenth Century. New York: Norton, 1981. online
- Boatright, Mody C. "The Myth of Frontier Individualism." Southwestern Social Science Quarterly (1941): 14–32. online
- Bold, Christine. The Frontier Club: Popular Westerns and Cultural Power, 1880–1924. New York: Oxford University Press, 2013. online
- Brégent-Heald Dominique. "Primitive Encounters: Film and Tourism in the North American West," Western Historical Quarterly 38, no. 1 (Spring, 2007): 47–67. online
- Clark, Thomas D. The Rampaging Frontier: Manners and Humors Of Pioneer Days In The South And The Middle West. Indianapolis: Bobbs-Merrill, 1939.
- Cronon, William. "The Trouble with Wilderness: Or, Getting Back to the Wrong Nature." Environmental History 1, no.1 (January 1996): 7–28. online
- Etulain, Richard W. Re-Imagining the Modern American West: A Century of Fiction, History, and Art. Tucson: University of Arizona Press. 1996.
- Goetzmann, William H. and William N. Goetzmann. The West of the Imagination. New York: Norton, 1989.
- Grabo, Norman S. "Ideology and the Early American Frontier." Early American Literature 22, no.3 (1987): 274–290. online
- Hausladen, Gary J. (2006). Western Places, American Myths: How We Think About The West. Reno, NV: University of Nevada Press. ISBN 978-0874176629.
- Hale, Peter B. William Henry Jackson and the Transformation of the American Landscape. Philadelphia: Temple University Press, 1986.
- Hyde, Anne Farrar. An American Vision: Far Western Landscape and National Culture, 1820–1920. New York: New York University Press, 1993.
- Mitchell, Lee Clark (1998). Westerns: Making the Man in Fiction and Film. University of Chicago Press. ISBN 978-0226532356.
- Moses, L.G. Wild West Shows and the Images of American Indians, 1883–1933. Albuquerque: University of New Mexico Press, 1996.
- Pomeroy, Earl. In Search of the Golden West: The Tourist in Western America. New York: Knopf. 1957.
- Prown, Jules David, Nancy K. Anderson, and William Cronon, eds. Discovered Lands, Invented Pasts: Transforming Visions of the American West. New Haven, CT: Yale University Press, 1994.
- Ronda, James P. Revealing America: Image & Imagination in the Exploration of North America. Boston, MA: Houghton Mifflin Harcourt, 1996.
- Rothman, Hal K. Devil's Bargains: Tourism and the Twentieth-Century American West. Lawrence: University of Kansas Press, 1998.
- Schwantes, Carlos Arnaldo, and James P. Ronda, The West the Railroads Made (2008), heavily illustrated. online
- Slotkin, Richard (1992). Gunfighter Nation: The Myth of the Frontier in Twentieth-Century America. Norman: University of Oklahoma Press.
- Slotkin, Richard. Regeneration Through Violence: The Mythology of the American Frontier, 1600–1860. Middletown, CT: Wesleyan University Press, 1973.
- Slotkin, Richard (1998). The Fatal Environment: The Myth of the Frontier in the Age of Industrialization, 1800–1890. Norman: University of Oklahoma Press.
- Smith, Henry Nash (1950). Virgin Land: The American West as Symbol and Myth. Cambridge, MA: Harvard University Press.
- Tompkins, Jane (1993). West of Everything: The Inner Life of Westerns. Oxford University Press. ISBN 978-0195073058.
- Weber, David J. and William deBuys. First Impressions: A Reader's Journey to Iconic Places of the American Southwest. New Haven: Yale University Press, 2017.
- White, Richard, and Patricia Nelson Limerick, eds. The Frontier in American Culture. Berkeley: University of California Press, 1994.
- Wrobel, David M. Global West, American Frontier: Travel, Empire, and Exceptionalism from Manifest Destiny to the Great Depression. Albuquerque: University of New Mexico Press, 2013; evaluates European and American travelers' accounts.

== Land policy ==
- Carstensen, Vernon, ed. The Public Lands: Histories of the Public Domain. Madison: University of Wisconsin Press, 1963.
- Dick, Everett. The Lure of the Land: A Social History of the Public Lands from the Articles of Confederation to the New Deal. Lincoln: University of Nebraska Press, 1970.
- Donaldson, Thomas. The Public Domain: Its History, with Statistics. Washington, D.C.: Government Printing Office, 1884.
- Gates, Paul W. "An Overview of American Land Policy". Agricultural History (1976): 213–229. in JSTOR
- Hibbard, Benjamin H. History of Public Land Policies. Madison: University of Wisconsin Press, 1965.
- Peffer, E. Louise. The Closing of the Public Domain: Disposal and Reservation Policies, 1900–1950. Redwood City, CA: Stanford University Press, 1951.
- Robbins, Roy M. Our National Heritage: The Public Domain, 1776–1936. Lincoln: University Of Nebraska Press; Reprint ed., 1962.
- Rohrbough, Malcolm. The Land Office Business: The Settlement and Administration of American Public Lands, 1789–1837. Oxford University Press, 1968.
- Swierenga, Robert P. "Land Speculation and Its Impact on American Economic Growth and Welfare: A Historiographical Review." Western Historical Quarterly 8, No. 3 (1977): 283–302. in JSTOR
- Van Atta, John R. Securing the West: Politics, Public Lands, and the Fate of the Old Republic, 1785–1850. Baltimore, MD: Johns Hopkins University Press, 2014. online review

== Military and diplomatic frontiers ==
- Ball, Durwood. Army Regulars on the Western Frontier, 1848–1861. Norman: University of Oklahoma Press, 2001.
- Bauer, K. Jack. The Mexican War, 1846–1848. Reprint, Lincoln: Bison Books, 1992.
- Brands, H.W. The Last Campaign: Sherman, Geronimo, and the War for America. New York: Anchor, 2022.
- Cozzens, Peter. The Earth Is Weeping: The Epic Story of the Indian Wars for the American West. New York: Knopf, 2016.
- Goetzmann, William H. When the Eagle Screamed: The Romantic Horizon in American Expansionism, 1800–1860. New York: Wiley, 1966.
- Greene, Jerome A. American Carnage: Wounded Knee, 1890. Lincoln: University of Oklahoma Press, 2014.
- Hedren, Paul L. After Custer: Loss and Transformation in Sioux Country. Norman: University of Oklahoma Press, 2011.
- Hurt, R. Douglas. The Indian Frontier, 1763–1846. Albuquerque: University of New Mexico Press, 2002.
- Hutton, Paul, ed. Soldiers West: Biographies from the Military Frontier. 2nd ed. Norman: University of Oklahoma Press, 2009.
- Josephy Jr., Alvin M. The Civil War in the American West. New York: Knopf, 1991.
- Leach, Douglas Edward. Flintlock and Tomahawk: New England in King Philip's War. 1958; Woodstock, VT: Countryman Press, 2009.
- McDermott, John D. A Guide to the Indian Wars of the West. Lincoln: University of Nebraska Press, 1998.
- Merk, Frederick. The Oregon Question: Essays in Anglo-American Diplomacy and Politics. Cambridge, MA: Belknap Press/Harvard University Press, 1967.
- Monnett, John H. Where a Hundred Soldiers Were Killed: The Struggle for the Powder River Country in 1866 and the Making of the Fetterman Myth. Albuquerque: University of New Mexico, 2008.
- Nichols, Roger L. Warrior Nations: The United States and Indian Peoples. Norman: University of Oklahoma Press, 2013.
- Powers, Thomas. The Killing of Crazy Horse. New York: Knopf, 2010.
- Prucha, Francis Paul. The Sword of the Republic: The United States Army on the Frontier, 1783–1846. Bloomington: Indiana University Press, 1977.
- Rooster, Robert. The United States Army and the Making of America: From Confederation to Empire, 1775–1903. Lawrence: University Press of Kansas, 2021.
- Unruh, William E. The Rise and Fall of Indian Country, 1825–1855. Lawrence: University Press of Kansas, 2007.
- Utley, Robert M. The Indian Frontier, 1846–1890. Albuquerque: University of New Mexico Press, 1984.
- Worcester, Donald E., ed. Forked Tongues and Broken Treaties. Caldwell, ID: Caxton Printers, 1975.

== Mining frontiers ==
- Brands, H.W. The Age of Gold: The California Gold Rush and the New American Dream. New York: Doubleday, 2002.
- Holliday, J.S. The World Rushed In: The California Gold Rush Experience. New York: Simon & Schuster, 1981.
- Huggard, Christopher. Santa Rita del Cobre: A Copper Mining Community in New Mexico. Denver: University Press of Colorado, 2013.
- McNeill, J. R., and George Vrtis, eds. Mining North America: An Environmental History since 1522. Berkeley: University of California Press, 2017.
- Owens, Kenneth. Riches for All: The California Gold Rush and the World. Lincoln: University of Nebraska Press, 2002.
- Paul, Rodman Wilson. Mining Frontiers of the Far West, 1848–1880. Albuquerque: University of New Mexico Press, 1980.
- Smith, Duane. Rocky Mountain Mining Camps: The Urban Frontier. Bloomington: Indiana University Press, 1967.
- Spence, Clark C. Mining Engineers and the American West: The Lace-Boot Brigade, 1849–1933. New Haven, CT: Yale University Press, 1970.
- Young, Otis E. Jr. Western Mining: An Informal Account of Precious-Metals Prospecting, Placering, Lode Mining, and Milling on the American Frontier from Spanish Times to 1893. Norman: University of Oklahoma Press, 1970.
- Zhu, Liping. A Chinaman's Chance: The Chinese on the Rocky Mountain Mining Frontier. Boulder: University Press of Colorado, 1997.

== Mormons ==
- Arrington, Leonard James. The Great Basin Kingdom: An Economic History of the Latter-day Saints, 1830–1900. Cambridge, MA: Harvard University Press, 1958.
- Arrington, Leonard J., and Davis Bitton. The Mormon Experience. New York: Knopf, 1979.
- Bushman, Richard Lyman. Joseph Smith: Rough Stone Rolling. New York: Knopf, 2005.
- Foster, Lawrence. "From Frontier Activism to Neo-Victorian Domesticity: Mormon Women in the Nineteenth and Twentieth Centuries." Journal of Mormon History 6 (1979): 3–21. online
- Hansen, Konden Smith. Frontier Religion: Mormons and America, 1857–1907. Salt Lake City: University of Utah Press, 2019.
- Milner, Clyde A., and Brian Q. Cannon, eds. Reconstruction and Mormon America. Norman: University of Oklahoma Press, 2019.
- Peterson, Charles S. Take Up Your Mission: Mormon Colonizing Along the Little Colorado River, 1870–1900. Tucson: University of Arizona Press, 1973.
- Ridge, Martin. "Mormon 'Deliverance' and the Closing of the Frontier." Journal of Mormon History 18, no.1 (1992): 137–152. online
- Smart, William B. and Donna T. Smart, eds. Over the Rim: The Parley P. Pratt Exploring Expedition to Southern Utah, 1849–50. Logan, UT: Utah State University Press, 1999.
- Turner, John G. Brigham Young: Pioneer Prophet. Cambridge, MA: Belknap Press (an Imprint of Harvard University Press), 2014.

== Native Americans ==
- Axtell, James. "The Ethnohistory of Early America: A Review Essay." The William and Mary Quarterly 35, no. 1 (1978): 110–44. https://doi.org/10.2307/1922574.
- Axtell, James. The European and the Indian: Essays in the Ethnohistory of Colonial North America. New York: Oxford University Press, 1982.
- Berkhofer Jr., Robert F. Salvation and the Savage: An Analysis of Protestant Missions and American Indian Response, 1787–1862. Lexington: University Press of Kentucky, 1965 online.
- Blackhawk, Ned. The Rediscovery of America: Native Peoples and the Unmaking of U.S. History. New Haven: Yale University Press, 2023.
- Calloway, Colin G. One Vast Winter Count: The Native American West before Lewis and Clark. Lincoln: University of Nebraska Press, 2003.
- Edmunds, R. David. The Potawatomis: Keepers of the Fire. Norman: University of Oklahoma Press, 1978.
- Flynn-Paul, Jeff, Not Stolen: The Truth About European Colonialism in the New World. New York: Bombardier Books, 2023.
- Heard, J. Norman. Handbook of the American Frontier: Four Centuries of Indian-White Relationships 5 volumes: 1) The Southeastern Woodlands, 2) The Northeastern Woodlands, 3) The Great Plains, 4) The Far West, and vol. 5) Chronology, Bibliography, Index. Lanham, Maryland: Scarecrow Press, 1987–1998.
- Lewis, David Rich. "Native Americans in the Nineteenth-century American West." in William Deverell, ed., A Companion to the American West, Hoboken, NJ: Wiley-Blackwell, 2004, 143–161. online
- Michno, Gregory. Encyclopedia of Indian Wars: Western Battles and Skirmishes, 1850–1890. Missoula: Mountain Press, 2009. ISBN 978-0878424689
- Prucha, F. P. "Andrew Jackson’s Indian Policy: A Reassessment." The Journal of American History 56, no. 3 (1969): 527–39. https://doi.org/10.2307/1904204.
- Prucha, Francis Paul. The Great Father: The United States Government and the American Indians. Abr. ed. Lincoln: University of Nebraska Press, 1986.
- Riley, Glenda. Women and Indians on the Frontier, 1825–1915. Albuquerque: University of New Mexico Press, 1984.
- Szasz, Margaret Connell, ed. Between Indians and White Worlds: The Cultural Broker. Norman: University of Oklahoma Press, 2001.
- Vaughan, Alden T. New England Frontier: Puritans and Indians, 1620–1675, 3rd edition. Norman: University of Oklahoma Press, 1995.
- Wallace, Anthony F.C. Jefferson and the Indians: The Tragic Fate of the First Americans. Cambridge, MA: Belknap Press, 1999.
- White, Richard. The Middle Ground: Indians, Empires, and Republics in the Great Lakes Region, 1650–1815. Cambridge, UK: Cambridge University Press, 2010.

== North American frontiers ==
- Adelman, Jeremy, and Stephen Aron. "From Borderlands to Borders: Empires, Nation-states, and the Peoples in between in North American History." American Historical Review 104, no.3 (1999): 814–841. online
- Bockstoce, John R. Furs and Frontiers in the Far North: The Contest among Native and Foreign Nations for the Bering Strait Fur Trade. New Haven: Yale University Press, 2009.
- Bolton, Herbert Eugene. The Spanish Borderlands: A Chronicle of Old Florida and the Southwest. New Haven: Yale University Press, 1921.
- Chevigny, Hector. Russian America: The Great Alaskan Adventure, 1741–1867. New York: Viking, 1965.
- Eccles, W. J. The Canadian Frontier, 1534–1760. Albuquerque: University of New Mexico Press, 1983.
- Echenberg, Myron. Humboldt's Mexico: In the Footsteps of the Illustrious German Scientific Traveller. Montreal: McGill-Queen's University Press, 2017.
- Elliott, Sir John H. Empires of the Atlantic World: Britain and Spain in America, 1492–1830. New Haven: Yale University Press, 2006.
- Fireman, Janet. The Spanish Royal Corps of Engineers in the Western Borderlands: Instrument of Bourbon reform, 1764 to 1815. Norman: Arthur H. Clark Company, 1977.
- Fischer, David Hackett. Champlain's Dream: The European Founding of North America. New York: Simon & Schuster, 2008.
- Gibson, James R. “Russian Expansion in Siberia and America.” Geographical Review 70, no. 2 (1980): 127–36. online
- Hämäläinen, Pekka. Indigenous Continent: The Epic Contest for North America. New York: Liveright, 2022.
- Kessell, John L. Spain in the Southwest: A Narrative History of Colonial New Mexico, Arizona, Texas, and California. Norman: University of Oklahoma, 2002.
- Webb, Melody. The Last Frontier: A History of the Yukon Basin of Canada and Alaska. Albuquerque: University of New Mexico Press, 1985.
- Weber, David J. The Mexican Frontier, 1821–1846: The American Southwest Under Mexico. Albuquerque: University of New Mexico Press, 1982.
- Weber, David J. The Spanish Frontier in North America. New Haven: Yale University Press, 1992.

== Primary sources ==
- DeVoto, Bernard, ed. The Journals of Lewis and Clark. Boston: Houghton Mifflin, 1953.
- Jackson, Donald, and Mary Lee Spence, eds. Expeditions of John Charles Fremont (3 vols. in 4 and Map Portfolio). Urbana: University of Illinois Press, 1970–1984.
- Phillips, Ulrich B. Plantation and Frontier Documents, 1649–1863; Illustrative of Industrial History in the Colonial and Antebellum South: Collected from MSS. and Other Rare Sources. Two volumes. 1909. vol 1 & 2 online
- Ridge, Martin, and Ray Allen Billington, eds. America's Frontier Story: A Documentary History of Westward Expansion. New York: Holt, Rinehart and Winston, 1969. online
- Still, Bayrd, ed. The West: Contemporary Records of America's Expansion Across the Continent, 1607–1890. London: Forgotten Books, 2018. online
- Watts, Edward, and David Rachels, eds. The First West: Writing from the American Frontier, 1776–1860. New York: Oxford University Press, 2002; primary sources, long excerpts from 59 authors. excerpt
- California Gold Rush, from PBS
- 1860s and 1870s from PBS
- 1880s from PBS
- "Closing the Frontier", from U California

== Race, class, and gender ==
- Broussard, Albert S. Black Cowboys in the American West: On the Range, on the Stage, Behind the Badge. Norman: University of Oklahoma Press, 2016. online
- Brown, Dee. The Gentle Tamers: Women of the Old West. Lincoln: University of Nebraska Press, 1968.
- Chung, Sue Fawn. In Pursuit of Gold: Chinese American Miners and Merchants in the American West. Urbana: University of Illinois Press, 2011 online
- Goldstein-Shirley, David. "Black Cowboys In the American West: A Historiographical Review." Ethnic Studies Review 20, no.1 (1997): 79–89 online
- Hall, Nicholas Sean. "The Wasp's 'Troublesome Children': Culture, Satire, and the Anti-Chinese Movement in the American West." California History 90, no. 2 (2013): 42–67. online
- Hardaway, Roger D. "African American Cowboys on the Western Frontier." Negro History Bulletin (2001): 27–33. online
- Iber, Jorge, and Arnoldo De León. Hispanics in the American west. London: Bloomsbury, 2005. online.
- LeCompte, Mary Lou. "The Hispanic Influence on the History of Rodeo, 1823–1922." Journal of Sport History 12, no.1 (1985): 21–38. online.
- Lukas, J. Anthony. Big Trouble: A Murder in a Small Western Town Sets Off a Struggle for the Soul of America. New York: Simon and Schuster, 1997; on class conflict in Idaho.
- Myres, Sandra L. Westering Women and the Frontier Experience, 1800–1915. Albuquerque: University of New Mexico Press, 1982.
- Pascoe, Peggy. Relations of Rescue: The Search for Female Moral Authority in the American West, 1874–1939. New York: Oxford University Press, 1990. online.
- Petrik, Paula. No Step Backward: Women and Family on the Rocky Mountain Mining Frontier, Helena, Montana, 1865 – 1900. Helena: Montana Historical Society, 1987.
- Roper, Avis, and Denise Scales. "A Realm of Descendant History: African American Families Homesteading the Great Plains." Black History Bulletin 83, no.2 (2020): 48–55. excerpt
- Taylor, Quintard. In Search of the Racial Frontier: African Americans in the American West, 1528–1990. 2nd ed. New York: Norton, 1999.
- Warren, Kim. "Gender, Race, Culture, and the Mythic American Frontier." Journal of Women's History 19, no. 1 (2007): 234–241. excerpt
- White, Richard. "Race Relations in the American West." American Quarterly 38, no. 3 (1986): 396–416. online
- Zhu, Liping. The Road to Chinese Exclusion: The Denver Riot, 1880 Election, and Rise of the West. Lawrence: University Press of Kansas, 2013.

== Religion ==
- Eslinger, Ellen. Citizens of Zion: The Social Origins of Camp Meeting Revivalism. Knoxville: University of Tennessee Press, 1999. online book review
- Haselby, Sam. "Sovereignty and Salvation on the Frontier of the Early American Republic." Past & Present 215 (2012): 165–194. online
- Johnson, Charles A. The Frontier Camp Meeting: Religion's Harvest Time (Southern Methodist UP, 1955) online
- Miyakawa, T. Scott. Protestants and Pioneers: Individualism and Conformity on the American Frontier. University of Chicago Press, 1964. online book review
- Posey, Walter Brownlow. Frontier mission; a history of religion west of the Southern Appalachians to 1861 (1966) online
- Shaw, Wayne. "The Historians' Treatment of the Cane Ridge Revival." Filson Club Historical Quarterly 37 (1963): 249–55. the Cane Ridge Revival in 1801 sparked an explosive growth of evangelical religion on the frontier online
- Sweet, William Warren. "Religion and Culture in the Middle West." Journal of Bible and Religion 14, no. 4 (1946): 191–197. online
- Sweet, William Warren. Religion in the Development of American culture, 1765–1840 (1952), emphasis on the frontier. online
- Sweet, William Warren, ed. Religion On The American Frontier (1931–1946); 4 vol of primary sources on Baptists, Congregationalists, Methodists, and Presbyterians, with scholarly introductions. online
- Szasz, Ferenc Morton. The Protestant Clergy in the Great Plains and Mountain West, 1865–1915. Albuquerque: University of New Mexico, 1988.
- Weisberger, Bernard A. They Gathered at the River : The Story of the Great Revivalists and Their Impact upon Religion in America. Boston, MA: Little, Brown, 1958 online

== Social history ==
- Bartlett, Richard A. The New Country: A Social History of the American Frontier 1776–1890. Oxford University Press, 1974.
- Curti, Merle, et al. The Making of an American Community: A Case Study of Democracy in a Frontier County. Redwood City, CA: Stanford University Press, 1959), deals with southwestern Wisconsin. online
- Dick, Everett. Vanguards of the Frontier: A Social History of the Northern Plains and Rocky Mountains from the Earliest White Contacts to the Coming of the Homemaker. Lincoln: University of Nebraska Press, 1941. online
- Dick, Everett. The Dixie frontier: A Social History of the Southern Frontier from the First Transmontane beginnings to the Civil War. New York: Knopf, 1948. online.
- Doyle, Don Harrison. The Social Order of a Frontier Community: Jacksonville, Illinois, 1825–70. Urbana: University of Illinois Press, 1983. online.
- Hamilton, William B. "The Southwestern Frontier, 1795–1817: An Essay in Social History." Journal of Southern History 10.4 (1944): 389–403. online
- Mann, Ralph. "Frontier Opportunity and the New Social History." Pacific Historical Review (1984): 463–491. online
- Nobles, Gregory H. "Breaking into the Backcountry: New Approaches to the Early American Frontier, 1750–1800." William and Mary Quarterly 46, no. 4 (1989): 642–670. online
- Peterson, Richard H. "The Frontier Thesis and Social Mobility on the Mining Frontier." Pacific Historical Review 44, no.1 (1975): 52–67. online
- West, Elliott. Growing Up with the Country: Childhood on the Far Western Frontier. Albuquerque: University of New Mexico Press, 1989.

== Transportation and communication ==
- Ambrose, Stephen E. Nothing Like It In the World: The Men Who Built the Transcontinental Railroad 1863–1869. New York: Simon and Schuster, 2000.
- Athearn, Robert G. Union Pacific Country. Chicago: Rand McNally, 1971.
- Dary, David. The Santa Fe Trail: Its History, Legends, and Lore (University Press of Kansas, 2012) online
- Harlow, Alvin F. Old Wires and New Waves: The History of the Telegraph, Telephone, and Wireless. New York: D. Appleton-Century, 1936.
- Jackson, W. Turrentine. Wagon Roads West. University of California Press, 1952.
- Oliva, Leo E. "The Santa Fe Trail and National Expansion: Commerce, Conquest, and Commemoration." Kansas History 44, no. 1 (2021): 2–15. online
- Reinfeld, Fred. Pony Express. New York: Macmillan, 1966.
- Schwoch, James. Wired into Nature: The Telegraph and the North American Frontier. Urbana: University of Illinois Press, 2018. online
- Schwantes, Carlos Arnaldo. Long Day's Journey: The Steamboat and Stagecoach Era in the Northern West. Seattle: University of Washington Press, 1999.
- Schwantes, Carlos Arnaldo and James P. Ronda. The West the Railroads Made. Seattle: University of Washington Press, 2008.
- Simmons, Marc. The Old Trail to Santa Fe: Collected Essays. Albuquerque: University of New Mexico, 1996.
- Thompson, Robert Luther. Wiring a Continent: The History of the Telegraph Industry in the United States, 1832–1866. Princeton, NJ: Princeton University Press, 1947.
- White, Richard. Railroaded: The Transcontinentals and the Making of Modern America. New York: Norton, 2011.
- Winther, Oscar Osburn. The Transportation Frontier – Trans-Mississippi West, 1856–1890. New York: Holt, Rinehart and Winston, 1964.

== Urban frontier ==
- Abbott, Carl. How Cities Won the West: Four Centuries of Urban Change in Western North America. Albuquerque: University of New Mexico Press, 2008.
- Barth, Gunther. Instant Cities: Urbanization and the Rise of San Francisco and Denver. Oxford University Press, 1975.
- Bogar, Thomas A. Theatre on the American Frontier. Baton Rouge: Louisiana State University Press, 2023. online.
- Cronon, William. Nature's Metropolis: Chicago and the Great West. New York: Norton, 1991.
- Dykstra, Robert R. The Cattle Towns. Lincoln, NE: Bison Books, 1983.
- Larsen, Lawrence H. The Urban West at the End of the Frontier. Lawrence: University Press of Kansas, 2021.
- Noel, Thomas J. The City and the Saloon: Denver, 1858–1916. Lincoln: University of Nebraska Press, 1982.
- Primm, James Neal. Lion of the Valley: St. Louis, Missouri, 1764–1980. 3rd ed. St. Louis: Missouri Historical Society Press, 1981.
- Sonnichsen, C.L. Tucson: The Life and Times of an American City. Lincoln: University of Oklahoma Press, 1982.
- Wade, Richard C. The Urban Frontier: The Rise of Western Cities, 1790–1830. Cambridge, MA: Harvard University Press. 1959.

== See also ==
- Western United States § Further reading
- List of bibliographies on American history
