= America's Western Frontiers =

1967 book by John A. Hawgood

- 1967 edition cover
- Author: John A. Hawgood
- Language: English
- Subject: American West
- Genre: Non-fiction
- Publisher: Alfred A. Knopf
- Publication date: 1967
- Publication place: United States

America's Western Frontiers: The Exploration and Settlement of the Trans-Mississippi West (released in the United Kingdom as The American West) is a book which chronicles the history of the American West from the Pre-Columbian era through the mid-twentieth century. It was written by John A. Hawgood, a professor of history at the University of Birmingham in England, whose speciality was the history of the American west. The book was first published by Alfred A. Knopf in 1967.

America's Western Frontiers won the Western History Association's Alfred A. Knopf Western History Prize for this book in 1966. The book also received the National Cowboy & Western Heritage Museum's Western Heritage Award for non-fiction books in 1968.

== Editions ==
- New York: Alfred A. Knopf, Inc., 1967. LoC 66–19380.
