= List of bibliographies of presidents of the United States =

This is a list of bibliographies of presidents of the United States:

- Bibliography of George Washington
- Bibliography of John Adams
- Bibliography of Thomas Jefferson
- Bibliography of James Madison
- Bibliography of James Monroe
- Bibliography of John Quincy Adams
- Bibliography of Andrew Jackson
- Bibliography of Martin Van Buren
- Bibliography of William Henry Harrison
- Bibliography of John Tyler
- Bibliography of James K. Polk
- Bibliography of Zachary Taylor
- Bibliography of Millard Fillmore
- Bibliography of Franklin Pierce
- Bibliography of James Buchanan
- Bibliography of Abraham Lincoln
- Bibliography of Andrew Johnson
- Bibliography of Ulysses S. Grant
- Bibliography of Rutherford B. Hayes
- Bibliography of James A. Garfield
- Bibliography of Chester A. Arthur
- Bibliography of Grover Cleveland
- Bibliography of Benjamin Harrison
- Bibliography of William McKinley
- Bibliography of Theodore Roosevelt
- Bibliography of William Howard Taft
- Bibliography of Woodrow Wilson
- Bibliography of Warren G. Harding
- Bibliography of Calvin Coolidge
- Bibliography of Herbert Hoover
- Bibliography of Franklin D. Roosevelt
- Bibliography of Harry S. Truman
- Bibliography of Dwight D. Eisenhower
- Bibliography of John F. Kennedy
- Bibliography of Lyndon B. Johnson
- Bibliography of Richard Nixon
- Bibliography of Gerald Ford
- Bibliography of Jimmy Carter
- Bibliography of Ronald Reagan
- Bibliography of George H. W. Bush
- Bibliography of Bill Clinton
- Bibliography of George W. Bush
- Bibliography of Barack Obama
- Bibliography of Donald Trump
- Bibliography of Joe Biden

== See also ==
- List of autobiographies by presidents of the United States
- List of bibliographies on American history
