= Bibliography of Warren G. Harding =

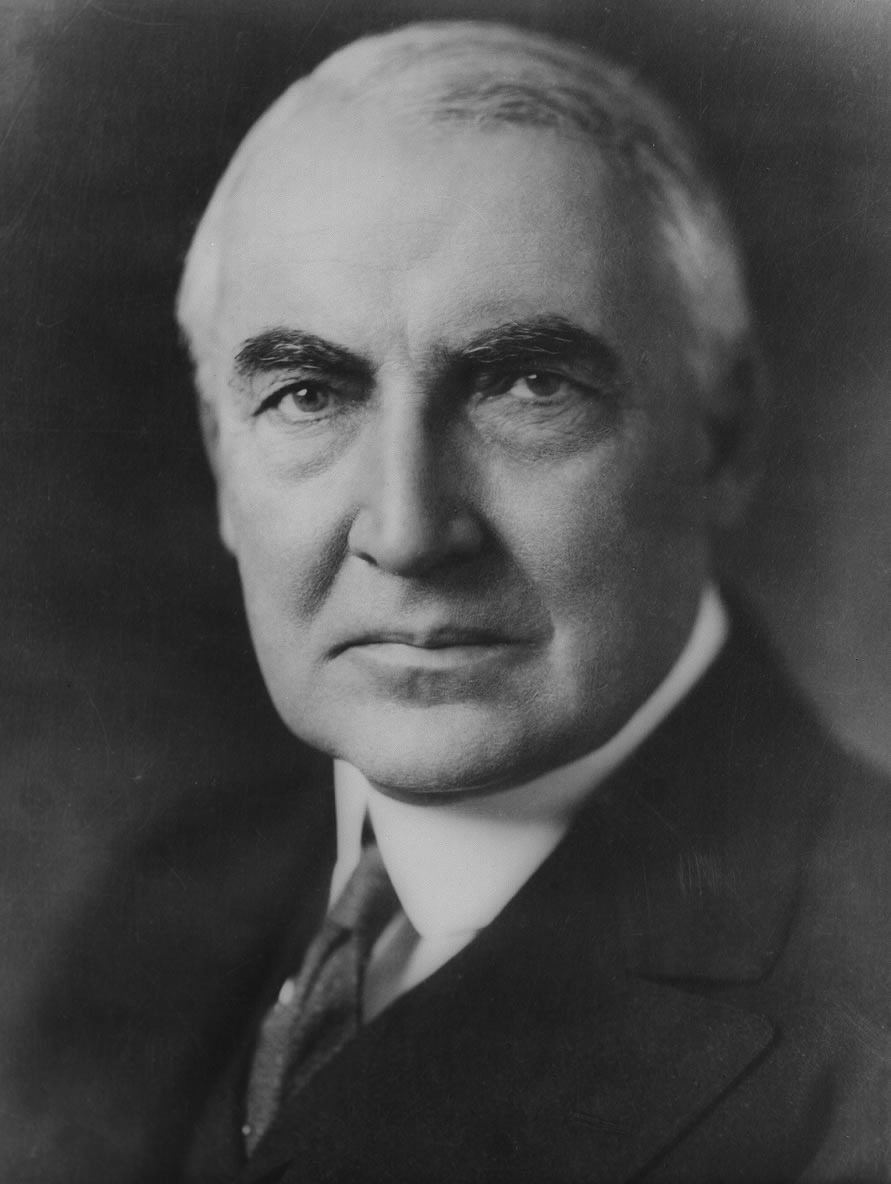
- Warren G. Harding (1865–1923)
- Subject: Warren G. Harding
- Scope: Books, journal articles, book chapters
- Period covered: November 2, 1865 – August 2, 1923
- Languages: English
- Part of bibliography series about: President of the United States
- Related bibliographies: Bibliography of Franklin D. Roosevelt; Bibliography of Herbert Hoover; Bibliography of Woodrow Wilson
- Related timelines: Timeline of the Calvin Coolidge presidency; Timeline of the Warren G. Harding presidency
- Related outlines and indexes: List of bibliographies of presidents of the United States; List of presidents of the United States; Outline of the history of the United States

This is a select bibliography of academic level books and journal articles, published mainly after World War II about the life of Warren G. Harding and the historical context of his life.

Warren Gamaliel Harding (November 2, 1865 – August 2, 1923) was the 29th president of the United States, serving from 1921 until his death in 1923. A member of the Republican Party, he won the 1920 United States presidential election by the largest popular-vote margin recorded to that point, campaigning for a "return to normalcy" after World War I in a front porch campaign conducted from his home in Marion, Ohio. Corruption in the Veterans Bureau and the Justice Department, and the dealings of his interior secretary Albert B. Fall, came to light during and after his administration, and most historians have since ranked him among the worst presidents.

Harding's tenure as the 29th president of the United States began on March 4, 1921, and ended with his death on August 2, 1923. Harding presided over the country in the aftermath of World War I. A Republican from Ohio, Harding held office during a period in American political history from the mid-1890s to 1932 that was generally dominated by his party. He died in San Francisco while returning from a tour of the West and Alaska, most likely of a heart attack, and was succeeded by Vice President Calvin Coolidge.

Bibliography contains academic level English language books (including translations) and journal articles, published mainly post World War II. (Note: Works published before World War II should be limited to areas where there are no significant post-World War II books on the subject or when the work in question has significant historical merit.) Book entries may have references to reviews published in academic journals or major newspapers when these could be considered helpful. These reference reviews also function as a resource to find other works on this subject.

Works listed here are cited in the notes or bibliographies of scholarly sources. Each is published by an academic or major trade press, written by a recognized expert, or substantially reviewed in scholarly journals; borderline cases are omitted. A selection of primary sources is included. Many of the books below carry their own bibliographies; see Further reading section for longer ones, and External links section for historical sites and museums.

Citations follow APA style. (Note: Entries are in plain text APA 7 format without templates; templates are used only for reviews and notes.) Books have citations to academic journal or mainstream published reviews when available. For books only partly about the subject, give relevant chapter or section titles where useful and available. Translators of the original-language edition are included when possible. In cases where a title or name has appeared with more than one English spelling, the most recent published form is used and a footnote documents any earlier title under which the work appeared.

== General biographies ==
- Adams, S. H. (1939). Incredible era: The life and times of Warren Gamaliel Harding. Houghton Mifflin.
- Dean, J. W. (2004). Warren G. Harding. Times Books.
- Russell, F. (1968). The shadow of Blooming Grove: Warren G. Harding in his times. McGraw-Hill.
- Sinclair, A. (1965). The available man: The life behind the masks of Warren Gamaliel Harding. Macmillan.

== Life before the presidency and family ==
- Anthony, C. S. (1998). Florence Harding: The first lady, the Jazz Age, and the death of America's most scandalous president. William Morrow.
- Britton, N. (1927). The president's daughter. Elizabeth Ann Guild.
- Downes, R. C. (1970). The rise of Warren Gamaliel Harding, 1865–1920. Ohio State University Press.
- Robenalt, J. D. (2009). The Harding affair: Love and espionage during the Great War. Palgrave Macmillan.
- Sibley, K. A. S. (2009). First lady Florence Harding: Behind the tragedy and controversy. University Press of Kansas.

== Presidency ==
- Bagby, W. M. (1955). The "smoke filled room" and the nomination of Warren G. Harding. The Mississippi Valley Historical Review, 41(4), 657–674.
- Bagby, W. M. (1962). The road to normalcy: The presidential campaign and election of 1920. Johns Hopkins Press.
- Bates, J. L. (1955). The Teapot Dome scandal and the election of 1924. The American Historical Review, 60(2), 303–322. JSTOR 1843188
- Bates, J. L. (1963). The origins of Teapot Dome: Progressives, parties, and petroleum, 1909–1921. University of Illinois Press.
- Bourdon, J. N. (2019). From Garfield to Harding: The success of Midwestern front porch campaigns. Kent State University Press.
- Brake, R. J. (1969). The porch and the stump: Campaign strategies in the 1920 presidential election. Quarterly Journal of Speech, 55(3), 256–267. doi:10.1080/00335636909382952
- Buckley, T. H. (1970). The United States and the Washington Conference, 1921–1922. University of Tennessee Press.
- Daniel, D. K. (2002). Ohio newspapers and the "whispering campaign" of the 1920 presidential election. Journalism History, 27(4), 156–164. doi:10.1080/00947679.2002.12062584
- Davis, C. J. (1997). Power at odds: The 1922 national railroad shopmen's strike. University of Illinois Press.
- Dollar, C. M. (1973). The South and the Fordney–McCumber Tariff of 1922: A study in regional politics. The Journal of Southern History, 39(1), 45–66.
- Frederick, R. G. (2014). The front porch campaign and the election of Harding. In K. A. S. Sibley (Ed.), A companion to Warren G. Harding, Calvin Coolidge, and Herbert Hoover (pp. 94–111). Wiley. doi:10.1002/9781118834510.ch5
- Freeberg, E. (2008). Democracy's prisoner: Eugene V. Debs, the Great War, and the right to dissent. Harvard University Press.
- Galbraith, J. S. (1948). The Imperial Conference of 1921 and the Washington Conference. Canadian Historical Review, 29(2), 143–152. doi:10.3138/chr-029-02-02
- Giglio, J. N. (1978). H. M. Daugherty and the politics of expediency. Kent State University Press.
- Grieb, K. J. (1976). The Latin American policy of Warren G. Harding. Texas Christian University Press.
- Libecap, G. D. (1984). The political allocation of mineral rights: A re-evaluation of Teapot Dome. The Journal of Economic History, 44(2), 381–391.
- Lower, A. R. M. (1966). Loring Christie and the genesis of the Washington Conference of 1921–1922. Canadian Historical Review, 47(1), 38–48. doi:10.3138/chr-047-01-03
- McCartney, L. (2008). The Teapot Dome scandal. Random House.
- Mee, C. L. (1981). The Ohio gang: The world of Warren G. Harding. M. Evans.
- Morello, J. A. (2001). Selling the president, 1920: Albert D. Lasker, advertising, and the election of Warren G. Harding. Praeger.
- Murray, R. K. (1969). The Harding era: Warren G. Harding and his administration. University of Minnesota Press.
- Murray, R. K. (1973). The politics of normalcy: Governmental theory and practice in the Harding-Coolidge era. W. W. Norton.
- Noggle, B. (1957). The origins of the Teapot Dome investigation. The Mississippi Valley Historical Review, 44(2), 237–266. JSTOR 1887189
- Noggle, B. (1962). Teapot Dome: Oil and politics in the 1920s. Louisiana State University Press.
- Palmer, N. (2014). More than a passive interest. Journal of American Studies, 48(2), 417–443.
- Palmer, N. A. (2008). The veterans' bonus and the evolving presidency of Warren G. Harding. Presidential Studies Quarterly, 38(1), 39–60. doi:10.1111/j.1741-5705.2007.02627.x
- Pavuk, A. (2014). No immigrants or radicals need apply. In K. A. S. Sibley (Ed.), A companion to Warren G. Harding, Calvin Coolidge, and Herbert Hoover (pp. 151–169). Wiley. doi:10.1002/9781118834510.ch8
- Pietrusza, D. (2006). 1920: The year of the six presidents. Carroll & Graf.
- Rader, B. G. (1971). Federal taxation in the 1920s: A re-examination. The Historian, 33(3), 415–435. doi:10.1111/j.1540-6563.1971.tb01516.x
- Sherman, R. B. (1964). The Harding administration and the Negro: An opportunity lost. The Journal of Negro History, 49(3), 151–168. JSTOR 2716654
- Stevens, R. (2016). A time of scandal: Charles R. Forbes, Warren G. Harding, and the making of the Veterans Bureau. Johns Hopkins University Press.
- Stratton, D. H. (1957). Behind Teapot Dome: Some personal insights. The Business History Review, 31(4), 385–402.
- Stratton, D. H. (1998). Tempest over Teapot Dome: The story of Albert B. Fall. University of Oklahoma Press.
- Trani, E. P., & Wilson, D. L. (1977). The presidency of Warren G. Harding. Regents Press of Kansas.
- Van Meter, R. H., Jr. (1977). The Washington Conference of 1921–1922: A new look. Pacific Historical Review, 46(4), 603–624.
- Vinson, J. C. (1955). The parchment peace: The United States Senate and the Washington Conference, 1921–1922. University of Georgia Press.
- Wimer, K., & Wimer, S. (1967). The Harding administration, the League of Nations, and the separate peace treaty. The Review of Politics, 29(1), 13–24.

== Life after the presidency ==
- Bates, J. L. (1974). Watergate and Teapot Dome. South Atlantic Quarterly, 73(2), 145–159. doi:10.1215/00382876-73-2-145
- Ferrell, R. H. (1996). The strange deaths of President Harding. University of Missouri Press.
- Fine, G. A. (1996). Reputational entrepreneurs and the memory of incompetence: Melting supporters, partisan warriors, and images of President Harding. American Journal of Sociology, 101(5), 1159–1193.
- Means, G. B., & Thacker, M. D. (1930). The strange death of President Harding. Guild Publishing.
- Payne, P. G. (2009). Dead last: The public memory of Warren G. Harding's scandalous legacy. Ohio University Press.
- Pecquet, G. M., & Thies, C. F. (2016). Reputation overrides record: How Warren G. Harding mistakenly became the "worst" president of the United States. The Independent Review, 21(1), 29–45.
- Russell, F. (1978). The shadow of Warren Harding. The Antioch Review, 36(1), 57–76.
- Schruben, F. W. (1966). An even stranger death of President Harding. Southern California Quarterly, 48(1), 57–84.

== Background ==
- Cannadine, D. (2006). Mellon: An American life. Knopf.
- Crockett, D. A. (2025). Winning it back: Restoration presidents and the cycle of American politics. Cornell University Press.
- Hawley, E. W. (1974). Herbert Hoover, the Commerce secretariat, and the vision of an "associative state," 1921–1928. The Journal of American History, 61(1), 116–140.
- O'Brien, P. G. (1973). A reexamination of the Senate farm bloc, 1921–1933. Agricultural History, 47(3), 248–263.
- Reitano, J. (2025). Charles Evans Hughes and the dawning of modern America. University Press of Kansas.
- Sherman, R. B. (1973). The Republican Party and Black America from McKinley to Hoover, 1896–1933. University Press of Virginia.
- Sibley, K. A. S. (Ed.). (2014). A companion to Warren G. Harding, Calvin Coolidge, and Herbert Hoover. Wiley. doi:10.1002/9781118834510
- Tarbert, J. (2022). When good government meant big government: The quest to expand federal power, 1913–1933. Columbia University Press.

== Historiography ==
- Coffey, J. P. (2014). Harding biographies. In K. A. S. Sibley (Ed.), A companion to Warren G. Harding, Calvin Coolidge, and Herbert Hoover (pp. 77–93). Wiley. doi:10.1002/9781118834510.ch4
- Doenecke, J. D. (2014). Historians' views of the Republican era. In K. A. S. Sibley (Ed.), A companion to Warren G. Harding, Calvin Coolidge, and Herbert Hoover (pp. 543–565). Wiley. doi:10.1002/9781118834510.ch27
- Murray, R. K., & Blessing, T. H. (1983). The presidential performance study: A progress report. The Journal of American History, 70(3), 535–555. JSTOR 1903482
- Potts, L. W. (1974). Who was Warren G. Harding? The Historian, 36(4), 621–645.

== Primary sources ==
- Daugherty, H. M., & Dixon, T. (1932). The inside story of the Harding tragedy. Churchill.
- Harding, W. G. (1921). Our common country: Mutual good will in America. Bobbs-Merrill.

== See also ==
- 1920 United States presidential election
- Albert B. Fall
- Emergency Quota Act
- Fordney–McCumber Tariff
- Harry M. Daugherty
- Ohio Gang
- Teapot Dome scandal
- Washington Naval Conference
