= Bibliography of Calvin Coolidge =

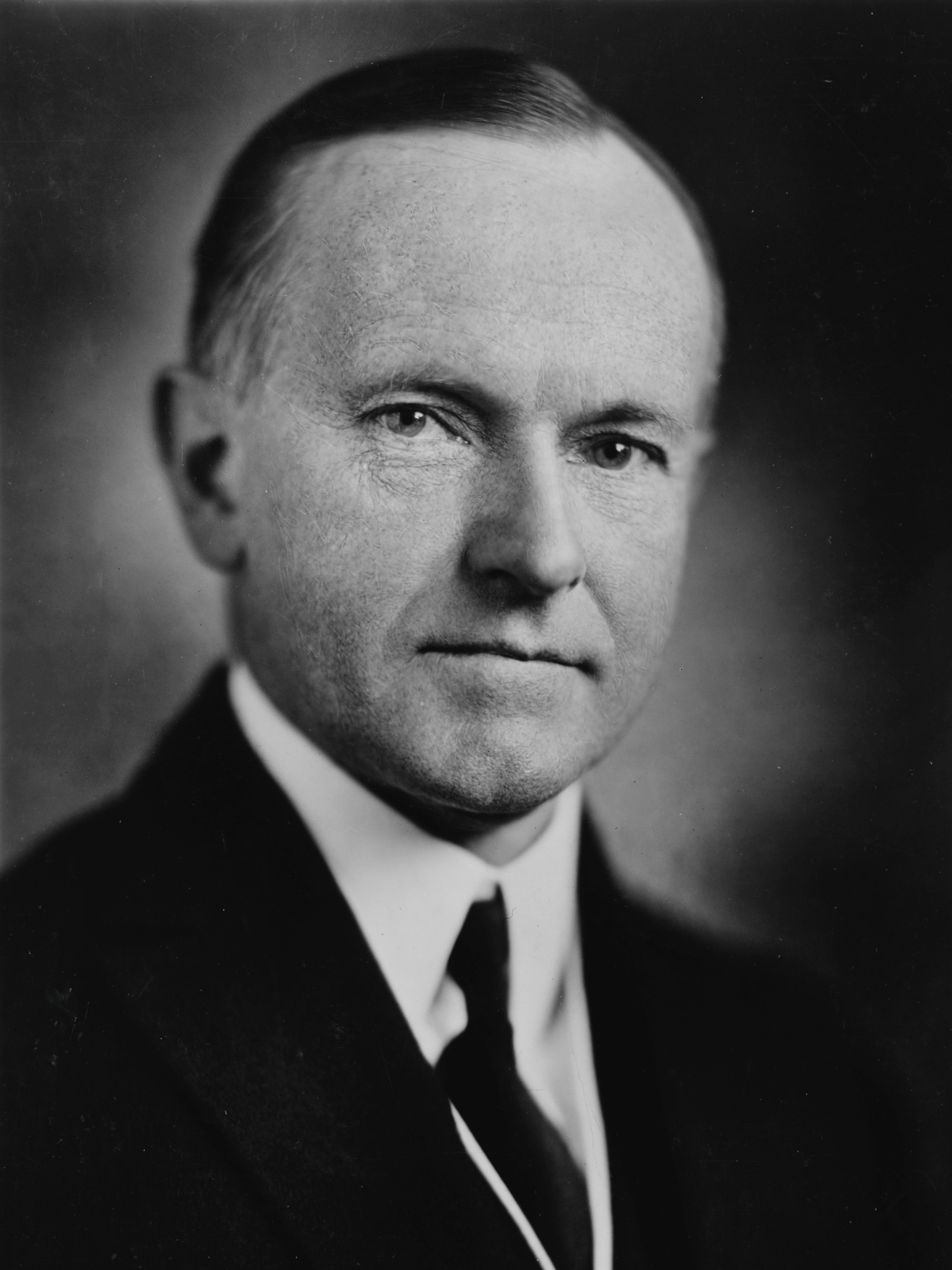
- Calvin Coolidge (1872–1933)
- Subject: Calvin Coolidge
- Scope: Books, journal articles, book chapters
- Period covered: July 4, 1872 – January 5, 1933
- Languages: English
- Part of bibliography series about: President of the United States
- Related bibliographies: Bibliography of Franklin D. Roosevelt; Bibliography of Herbert Hoover; Bibliography of Woodrow Wilson
- Related timelines: Timeline of the Calvin Coolidge presidency; Timeline of the Warren G. Harding presidency
- Related outlines and indexes: List of bibliographies of presidents of the United States; List of presidents of the United States; Outline of the history of the United States

This is a select bibliography of academic level books and journal articles, published mainly after World War II about the life of Calvin Coolidge and the historical context of his life.

Calvin Coolidge (born John Calvin Coolidge Jr.; /ˈkuːlɪdʒ/ KOOL-ij; July 4, 1872 – January 5, 1933) was the 30th president of the United States, serving from 1923 to 1929. A Republican lawyer from Massachusetts, he served from 1921 to 1923 as the 29th vice president, under President Warren G. Harding, and from 1919 to 1921 as the 48th governor of Massachusetts, winning national attention when he called out the state's National Guard to break the 1919 Boston police strike. Coolidge gained a reputation as a small-government conservative, with a taciturn personality and dry sense of humor that earned him the nickname "Silent Cal".

Calvin Coolidge's tenure as the 30th president of the United States began on August 2, 1923, when Coolidge became president upon Warren G. Harding's death, and ended on March 4, 1929. (Note: Harding died late on August 2, 1923, and Coolidge succeeded to the office at that moment; he took the oath of office in the early hours of August 3, which is the date The American Presidency Project gives for the start of his term.) A Republican from Massachusetts, Coolidge had been vice president for 2 years, 151 days when he succeeded to the presidency upon the sudden death of Harding. Elected to a full four-year term in 1924, Coolidge gained a reputation as a small-government conservative. Coolidge was succeeded by former Secretary of Commerce Herbert Hoover after the 1928 presidential election.

Bibliography contains academic level English language books (including translations) and journal articles, published mainly post World War II. (Note: Works published before World War II should be limited to areas where there are no significant post-World War II books on the subject or when the work in question has significant historical merit.) Book entries may have references to reviews published in academic journals or major newspapers when these could be considered helpful. These reference reviews also function as a resource to find other works on this subject.

Works listed here are cited in the notes or bibliographies of scholarly sources. Each is published by an academic or major trade press, written by a recognized expert, or substantially reviewed in scholarly journals; borderline cases are omitted. A selection of primary sources is included. Many of the books below carry their own bibliographies; see Further reading section for longer ones, and External links section for historical sites and museums.

Citations follow APA style. (Note: Entries are in plain text APA 7 format without templates; templates are used only for reviews and notes.) Books have citations to academic journal or mainstream published reviews when available. For books only partly about the subject, give relevant chapter or section titles where useful and available. Translators of the original-language edition are included when possible. In cases where a title or name has appeared with more than one English spelling, the most recent published form is used and a footnote documents any earlier title under which the work appeared.

== General biographies ==
- Fuess, C. M. (1940). Calvin Coolidge: The man from Vermont. Little, Brown.
- Greenberg, D. (2006). Calvin Coolidge. Times Books.
- McCoy, D. R. (1967). Calvin Coolidge: The quiet president. Macmillan.
- Shlaes, A. (2013). Coolidge. Harper.
- Sobel, R. (1998). Coolidge: An American enigma. Regnery Publishing.
- White, W. A. (1938). A Puritan in Babylon: The story of Calvin Coolidge. Macmillan.

== Life before the presidency and family ==
- Applegate, D. (2020). The Amherst man in the Jazz Age. In M. Saxton (Ed.), Amherst in the world (pp. 269–288). Amherst College Press.
- Booraem, H. (1994). The provincial: Calvin Coolidge and his world, 1885–1895. Bucknell University Press.
- Ferrell, R. H. (2008). Grace Coolidge: The people's lady in Silent Cal's White House. University Press of Kansas.
- Finneman, T., & Thomas, R. J. (2014). First ladies in permanent conjuncture: Grace Coolidge and "Great" American womanhood in the New York Times. Women's Studies in Communication, 37(2), 220–236. doi:10.1080/07491409.2014.911232
- Gilbert, R. E. (1988). Psychological pain and the presidency: The case of Calvin Coolidge. Political Psychology, 9(1), 75–100.
- Gilbert, R. E. (2003). The tormented president: Calvin Coolidge, death, and clinical depression. Praeger.
- Gilbert, R. E. (2005). Calvin Coolidge's tragic presidency: The political effects of bereavement and depression. Journal of American Studies, 39(1), 87–109.
- Gilbert, R. E. (2006). Personal tragedy and presidential performance: Calvin Coolidge as legislative leader. Congress & the Presidency, 33(2), 47–68. doi:10.1080/07343460609507674
- Lyons, R. L. (1947). The Boston police strike of 1919. The New England Quarterly, 20(2), 147–168.
- Oliver, W. M. (2023). The Boston police strike of 1919: Politics, riots, and the fight for unionization. Rowman & Littlefield. doi:10.5771/9781538144121
- Ross, I. (1962). Grace Coolidge and her era: The story of a president's wife. Dodd, Mead.
- Russell, F. (1975). A city in terror: 1919, the Boston police strike. Viking Press.
- Slater, J. (1996). Public workers: Labor and the Boston police strike of 1919. Labor History, 38(1), 7–27. doi:10.1080/00236649712331387004

== Presidency ==
- Allerfeldt, K. (2010). "And we got here first": Albert Johnson, national origins and self-interest in the immigration debate of the 1920s. Journal of Contemporary History, 45(1), 7–26. doi:10.1177/0022009409348019
- Barry, J. M. (1997). Rising tide: The great Mississippi flood of 1927 and how it changed America. Simon & Schuster.
- Blair, J. L. (1969). A time for parting: The Negro during the Coolidge years. Journal of American Studies, 3(2), 177–199.
- Blair, J. L. (1973). Coolidge the image-maker: The president and the press, 1923–1929. The New England Quarterly, 46(4), 499–522.
- Bruyneel, K. (2004). Challenging American boundaries: Indigenous people and the "gift" of U.S. citizenship. Studies in American Political Development, 18(1), 30–43. doi:10.1017/s0898588x04000021
- Buckley, K. W. (2003). A president for the "great silent majority": Bruce Barton's construction of Calvin Coolidge. The New England Quarterly, 76(4), 593–626. JSTOR 1559844
- Carroll, F. M. (2018). War and peace and international law: The Kellogg-Briand Peace Pact reconsidered. Canadian Journal of History, 53(1), 86–96. doi:10.3138/cjh.ach.53.1.04
- Clemens, C., & Daggett, A. P. (1945). Coolidge's "I do not choose to run": Granite or putty? The New England Quarterly, 18(2), 147–163.
- Daniel, P. (1977). Deep'n as it come: The 1927 Mississippi River flood. Oxford University Press.
- Devine, C. J. (2025). It wasn't just the economy, stupid: How Calvin Coolidge won the 1924 presidential election. Presidential Studies Quarterly, 55(3), Article e70007. doi:10.1111/psq.70007
- Ellis, L. E. (1961). Frank B. Kellogg and American foreign relations, 1925–1929. Rutgers University Press.
- Ferrell, R. H. (1952). Peace in their time: The origins of the Kellogg-Briand Pact. Yale University Press.
- Ferrell, R. H. (1998). The presidency of Calvin Coolidge. University Press of Kansas.
- Fite, G. C. (1951). The agricultural issue in the presidential campaign of 1928. The Mississippi Valley Historical Review, 37(4), 653–672.
- Fite, G. C. (1954). George N. Peek and the fight for farm parity. University of Oklahoma Press.
- Fowler, R. (2000). Calvin Coolidge and the Supreme Court. Journal of Supreme Court History, 25(3), 271–295. doi:10.1353/sch.2000.0003
- Haynes, J. E. (Ed.). (1998). Calvin Coolidge and the Coolidge era: Essays on the history of the 1920s. Library of Congress.
- Hirobe, I. (2001). Japanese pride, American prejudice: Modifying the exclusion clause of the 1924 Immigration Act. Stanford University Press.
- Johnson, R. T. (1980). Part-time leader: Senator Charles L. McNary and the McNary-Haugen bill. Agricultural History, 54(4), 527–541.
- Kamman, W. (1968). A search for stability: United States diplomacy toward Nicaragua, 1925–1933. University of Notre Dame Press.
- Lohof, B. A. (1970). Herbert Hoover, spokesman of humane efficiency: The Mississippi flood of 1927. American Quarterly, 22(3), 690–700.
- McKercher, B. J. C. (2007). "A certain irritation": The White House, the State Department, and the desire for a naval settlement with Great Britain, 1927–1930. Diplomatic History, 31(5), 829–863.
- McVeigh, R., Myers, D. J., & Sikkink, D. (2004). Corn, Klansmen, and Coolidge: Structure and framing in social movements. Social Forces, 83(2), 653–690. doi:10.1353/sof.2005.0019
- Mizelle, R. M., Jr. (2014). Backwater blues: The Mississippi flood of 1927 in the African American imagination. University of Minnesota Press.
- Moore, J. A. (2014). The original supply siders: Warren Harding and Calvin Coolidge. The Independent Review, 18(4), 597–618.
- Murnane, M. S. (2004). Selling scientific taxation: The Treasury Department's campaign for tax reform in the 1920s. Law & Social Inquiry, 29(4), 819–856.
- Murray, R. K. (1976). The 103rd ballot: Democrats and the disaster in Madison Square Garden. Harper & Row.
- Ngai, M. M. (1999). The architecture of race in American immigration law: A reexamination of the Immigration Act of 1924. The Journal of American History, 86(1), 67–92. JSTOR 2567407
- Parker, A. W. (1924). The quota provisions of the Immigration Act of 1924. The American Journal of International Law, 18(4), 737–754.
- Parrish, S. S. (2016). The flood year 1927: A cultural history. Princeton University Press.
- Porter, K. K. (2000). Embracing the pluralist perspective: The Iowa Farm Bureau Federation and the McNary-Haugen movement. Agricultural History, 74(2), 381–392.
- Ross, S. R. (1958). Dwight W. Morrow, ambassador to Mexico. The Americas, 14(3), 273–289.
- Schulman, B. J. (2015). Farewell to the "smoke-filled room": Parties, interests, public relations, and the election of 1924. In G. Davies & J. E. Zelizer (Eds.), America at the ballot box: Elections and political history (pp. 139–152). University of Pennsylvania Press. doi:10.9783/9780812291360-008
- Shideler, J. H. (1950). The La Follette Progressive Party campaign of 1924. The Wisconsin Magazine of History, 33(4), 444–457.
- Shideler, J. H. (1951). The disintegration of the Progressive Party movement of 1924. The Historian, 13(2), 189–201.
- Shogan, C. J. (2006). Coolidge and Reagan: The rhetorical influence of Silent Cal on the Great Communicator. Rhetoric & Public Affairs, 9(2), 215–234. doi:10.1353/rap.2006.0059
- Spencer, R. (1994). Contested terrain: The Mississippi flood of 1927 and the struggle to control Black labor. The Journal of Negro History, 79(2), 170–181.
- Voth, B. (2023). The presidential rhetoric of Woodrow Wilson, Warren Harding, and Calvin Coolidge: The centennial of the modern American presidency. Lexington Books.
- Weber, J. (2023). The Immigration Act of 1924 and farm labor. Labor, 20(4), 60–68. doi:10.1215/15476715-10829171
- Zieger, R. H. (1965). Pinchot and Coolidge: The politics of the 1923 anthracite crisis. The Journal of American History, 52(3), 566–581.
- Zimmer, E. S. (2017). A president in Indian country: Calvin Coolidge and Lakota diplomacy in the summer of 1927. Great Plains Quarterly, 37(3), 215–234. doi:10.1353/gpq.2017.0036

== Background ==
- Cannadine, D. (2006). Mellon: An American life. Knopf.
- Craig, D. B. (2000). Fireside politics: Radio and political culture in the United States, 1920–1940. Johns Hopkins University Press.
- Hawley, E. W. (1974). Herbert Hoover, the Commerce Secretariat, and the vision of an "associative state," 1921–1928. The Journal of American History, 61(1), 116–140.
- Leffler, M. P. (1979). The elusive quest: America's pursuit of European stability and French security, 1919–1933. University of North Carolina Press.
- Leuchtenburg, W. E. (1958). The perils of prosperity, 1914–32. University of Chicago Press.
- Ngai, M. M. (2004). Impossible subjects: Illegal aliens and the making of modern America. Princeton University Press.
- Ponder, S. (1999). Managing the press: Origins of the media presidency, 1897–1933. St. Martin's Press.
- Sibley, K. A. S. (Ed.). (2014). A companion to Warren G. Harding, Calvin Coolidge, and Herbert Hoover. Wiley. doi:10.1002/9781118834510
- Smith, R. F. (1972). The United States and revolutionary nationalism in Mexico, 1916–1932. University of Chicago Press.
- Tichenor, D. (2023). Nativism and the bottom line: Contemporary legacies of the Immigration Act of 1924. Labor, 20(4), 52–59. doi:10.1215/15476715-10829157

== Historiography ==
- Braeman, J. (1982). Power and diplomacy: The 1920's reappraised. The Review of Politics, 44(3), 342–369.
- Noggle, B. (1966). The twenties: A new historiographical frontier. The Journal of American History, 53(2), 299–314.
- Roberts, J. (2014). The biographical legacy of Calvin Coolidge and the 1924 presidential election. In K. A. S. Sibley (Ed.), A companion to Warren G. Harding, Calvin Coolidge, and Herbert Hoover (pp. 191–211). Wiley. doi:10.1002/9781118834510.ch10
- Silver, T. (1982). Coolidge and the historians. Carolina Academic Press.

== Primary sources ==
- Coolidge, C. (1929). The autobiography of Calvin Coolidge. Cosmopolitan Book Corporation.
- Lathem, E. C. (Ed.). (1968). Your son, Calvin Coolidge: A selection of letters from Calvin Coolidge to his father. Vermont Historical Society.
- Quint, H. H., & Ferrell, R. H. (Eds.). (1964). The talkative president: The off-the-record press conferences of Calvin Coolidge. University of Massachusetts Press.

== See also ==
- 1924 United States presidential election
- Calvin Coolidge Presidential Library and Museum
- Great Mississippi Flood of 1927
- Immigration Act of 1924
- Indian Citizenship Act
- Kellogg–Briand Pact
- Teapot Dome scandal
