= Bibliography of James A. Garfield =

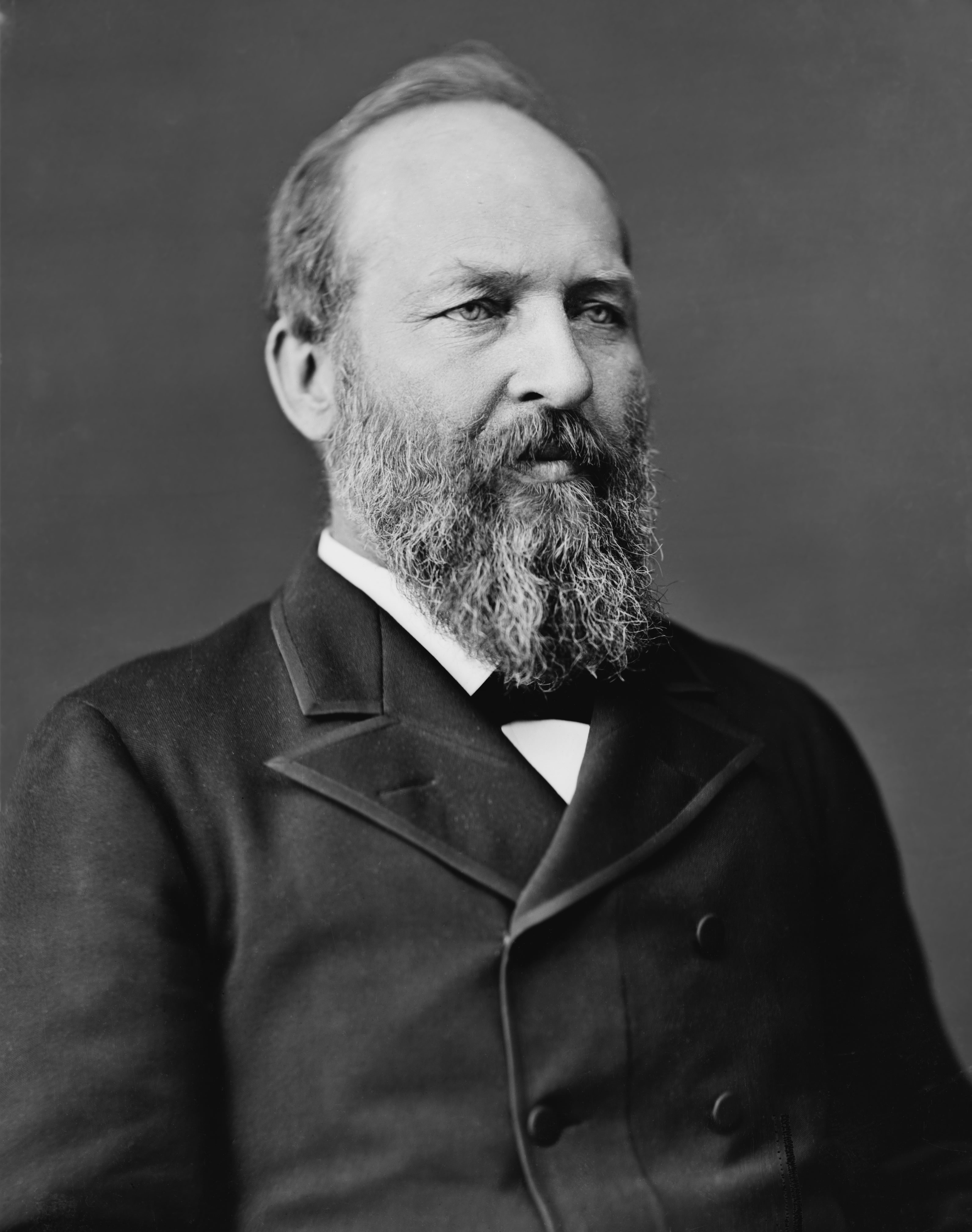
- James A. Garfield (1831–1881)
- Subject: James A. Garfield
- Scope: Books, journal articles, book chapters
- Period covered: November 19, 1831 – September 19, 1881
- Languages: English
- Part of bibliography series about: President of the United States
- Related bibliographies: Bibliography of the Reconstruction era; Bibliography of William McKinley; Bibliography of works on Ulysses S. Grant
- Related timelines: Timeline of the James A. Garfield presidency; Timeline of the Rutherford B. Hayes presidency
- Related outlines and indexes: List of bibliographies of presidents of the United States; List of presidents of the United States; Outline of the history of the United States

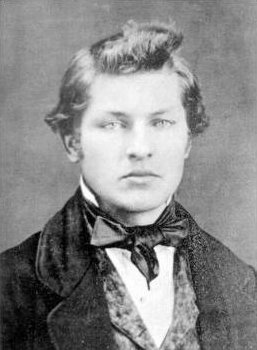
Garfield at the age of 16

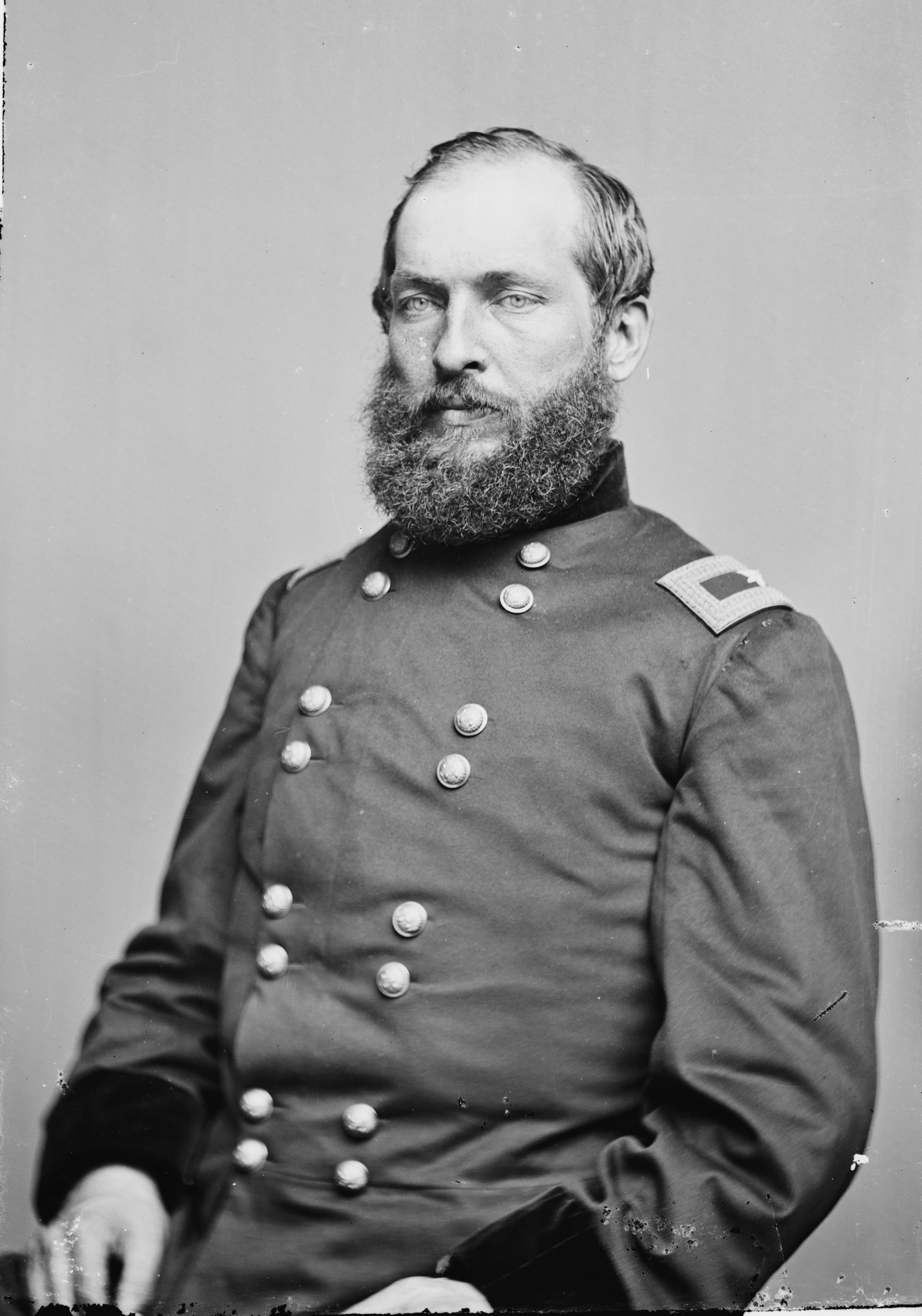
Garfield as a brigadier general during the Civil War

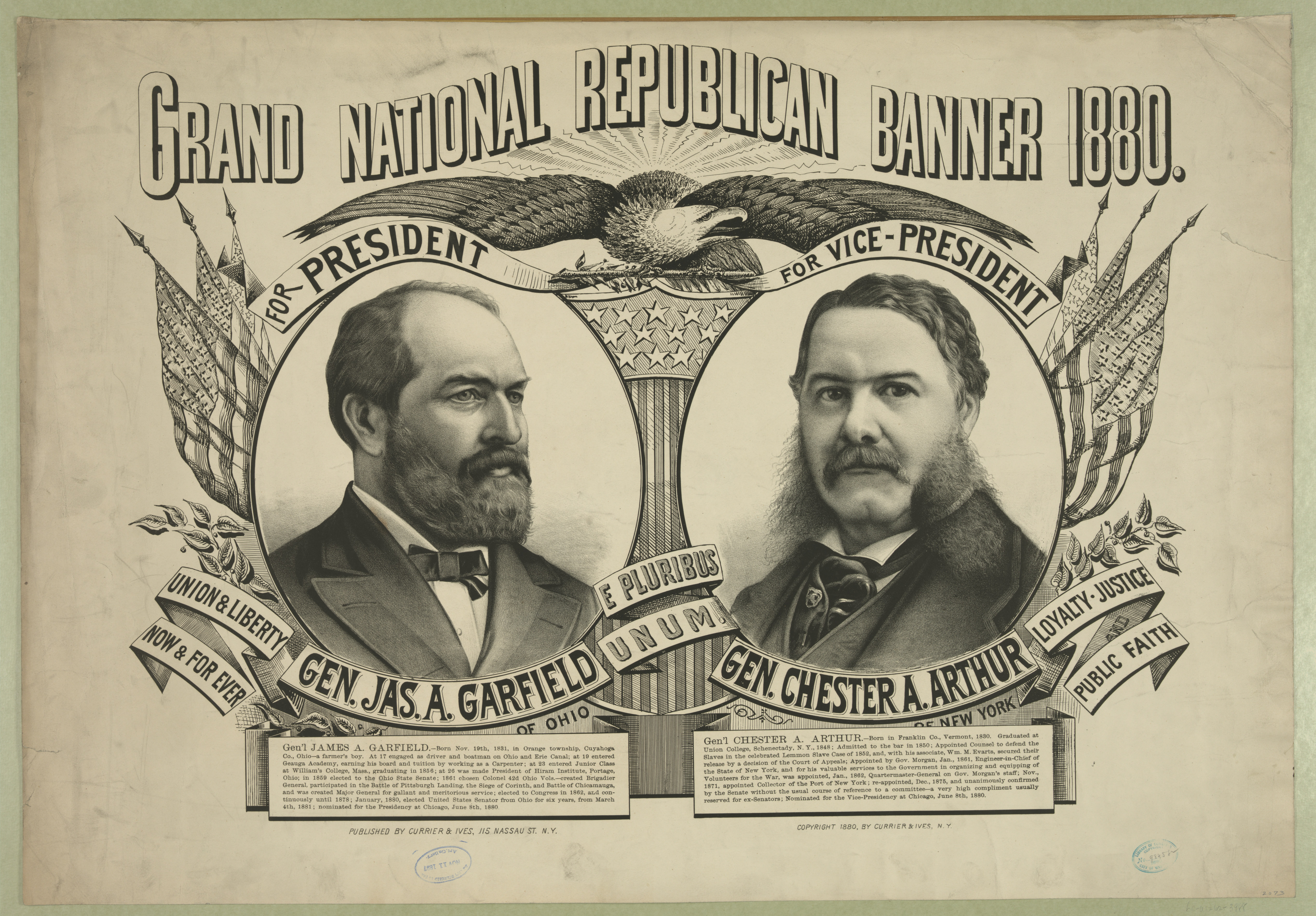
Garfield–Arthur election poster

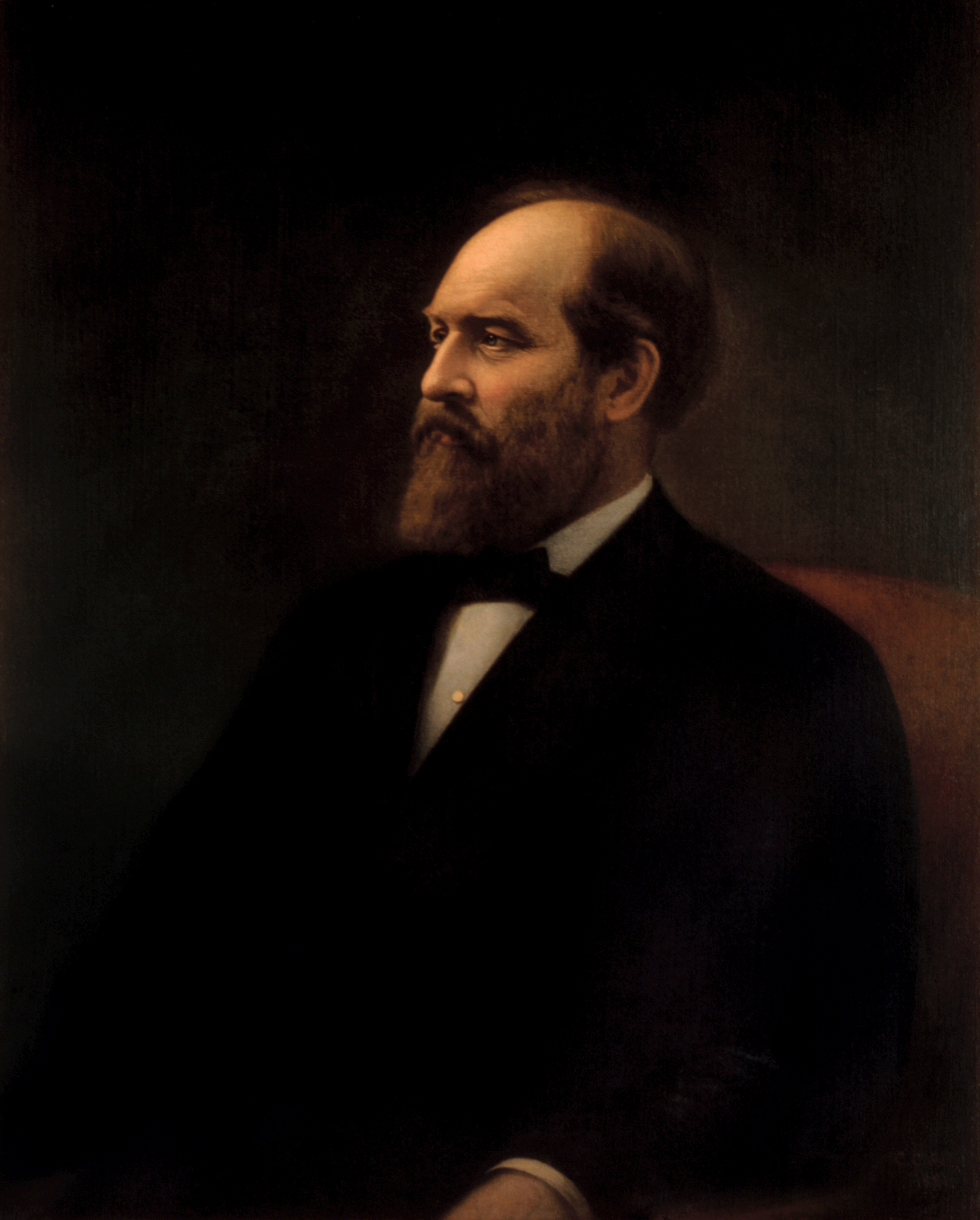
Official White House portrait of James Garfield, 1881

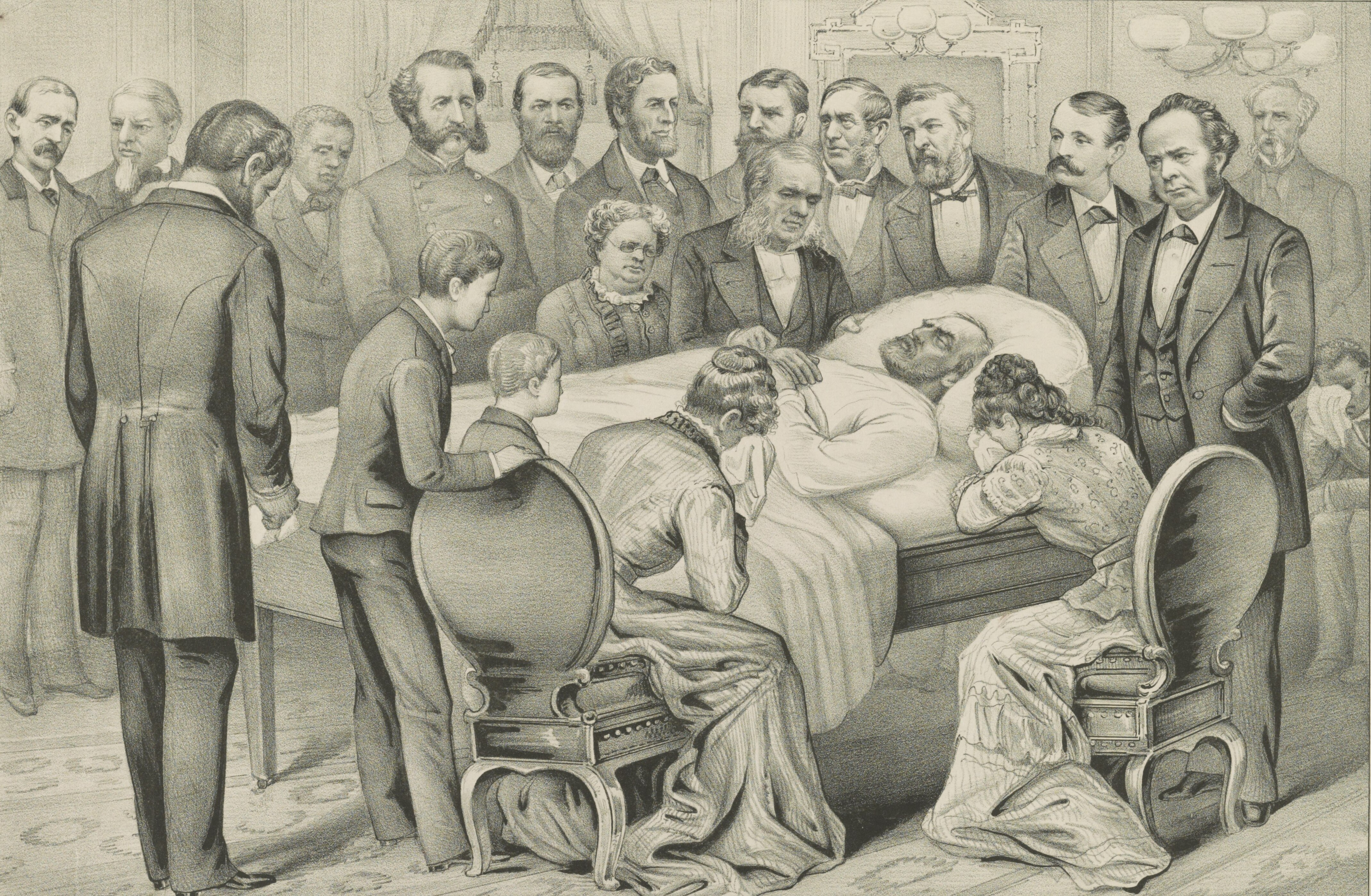
A depiction of Garfield on his deathbed

This is a select bibliography of academic level books and journal articles, published mainly after World War II about the life of James A. Garfield and the historical context of his life.

James Abram Garfield (November 19, 1831 – September 19, 1881) was the 20th president of the United States, serving from March 1881 until his death in September that year after being shot in July. A preacher, lawyer, and Civil War general, Garfield served nine terms in the United States House of Representatives and is the only sitting member of the House to be elected president. Before he ran for president, the Ohio General Assembly had elected him to the U.S. Senate, a position he declined upon becoming president-elect.

Bibliography contains academic level English language books (including translations) and journal articles, published mainly post World War II. (Note: Works published before World War II should be limited to areas where there are no significant post-World War II books on the subject or when the work in question has significant historical merit.) Book entries may have references to reviews published in academic journals or major newspapers when these could be considered helpful. These reference reviews also function as a resource to find other works on this subject.

Works listed here are cited in the notes or bibliographies of scholarly sources. Each is published by an academic or major trade press, written by a recognized expert, or substantially reviewed in scholarly journals; borderline cases are omitted. A selection of primary sources is included. Many of the books below carry their own bibliographies; see Further reading section for longer ones, and External links section for historical sites and museums.

Citations follow APA style. (Note: Entries are in plain text APA 7 format without templates; templates are used only for reviews and notes.) Books have citations to academic journal or mainstream published reviews when available. For books only partly about the subject, give relevant chapter or section titles where useful and available. Translators of the original-language edition are included when possible. In cases where a title or name has appeared with more than one English spelling, the most recent published form is used and a footnote documents any earlier title under which the work appeared.

== General biographies ==
- Booraem, H., V. (1988). The road to respectability: James A. Garfield and his world, 1844–1852. Bucknell University Press.
- Caldwell, R. G. (1931). James A. Garfield, party chieftain. Dodd, Mead and Company.
- Goodyear, C. W. (2023). President Garfield: From radical to unifier. Simon & Schuster.
- Leech, M., & Brown, H. J. (1978). The Garfield orbit. Harper & Row.
- Peskin, A. (1978). Garfield: A biography. Kent State University Press.
- Rutkow, I. (2006). James A. Garfield. Times Books.
- Smith, T. C. (1925). The life and letters of James Abram Garfield (Vols. 1–2). Yale University Press.
- Taylor, J. M. (1970). Garfield of Ohio: The available man. W. W. Norton.

== Life before the presidency and family ==
- Arrington, B. T. (2016). Lucy Webb Hayes, Lucretia Rudolph Garfield, and Mary Arthur McElroy. In K. A. S. Sibley (Ed.), A companion to first ladies (pp. 247–264). Wiley. doi:10.1002/9781118732250.ch15
- Booraem, H., V. (1988). The road to respectability: James A. Garfield and his world, 1844–1852. Bucknell University Press.
- Hill, V. E., IV. (2002). President Garfield and the Pythagorean theorem. Math Horizons, 9(3), 9–11, 15. JSTOR 25678350
- Peskin, A. (1981). James A. Garfield, historian. The Historian, 43(4), 483–492. doi:10.1111/j.1540-6563.1981.tb00604.x
- Peskin, A. (2000a). Garfield, Lucretia Rudolph (1832–1918), first lady. In American national biography online. Oxford University Press. doi:10.1093/anb/9780198606697.article.0401121
- Shaw, J. (Ed.). (1994). Crete and James: Personal letters of Lucretia and James Garfield. Michigan State University Press.

== Presidency ==
- Ackerman, K. D. (2003). Dark horse: The surprise election and political murder of President James A. Garfield. Carroll & Graf.
- Arrington, B. T. (2020). The last Lincoln Republican: The presidential election of 1880. University Press of Kansas.
- Arrington, B. T., & Blubaugh, C. (2025). Was James Garfield really a "dark horse" in 1880? Middle West Review, 12(1–2), 31–49. doi:10.1353/mwr.2025.a986703
- Bage, E. S. (1951). President Garfield's forgotten pronouncement. Negro History Bulletin, 14(9), 195–197, 206, 214. JSTOR 44212474
- Bourdon, J. N. (2014). Germans, Jubilee Singers, and axe men: James A. Garfield and the original front-porch campaign for the presidency. Ohio History, 121(1), 112–129. doi:10.1353/ohh.2014.0006
- Clancy, H. J. (1958). The presidential election of 1880. Loyola University Press.
- De Santis, V. P. (1959). President Garfield and the Solid South. The North Carolina Historical Review, 36(4), 442–465. JSTOR 23516920
- Doenecke, J. D. (1981). The presidencies of James A. Garfield and Chester A. Arthur. Regents Press of Kansas.
- Evans, F. B. (1960). Wharton Barker and the Republican National Convention of 1880. Pennsylvania History: A Journal of Mid-Atlantic Studies, 27(1), 28–43. JSTOR 27769930
- Klotsche, J. M. (1935). The Star Route cases. The Mississippi Valley Historical Review, 22(3), 407–418. JSTOR 1892626
- Peskin, A. (1972). The "put-up job": Wisconsin and the Republican National Convention of 1880. The Wisconsin Magazine of History, 55(4), 263–274. JSTOR 4634738
- Peskin, A. (1977b). President Garfield and the rating game: An evaluation of a brief administration. South Atlantic Quarterly, 76(1), 93–102. doi:10.1215/00382876-76-1-93
- Peskin, A. (1979). Blaine, Garfield and Latin America: A new look. The Americas, 36(1), 79–89. JSTOR 981139
- Peters, S. F. (2023). When bad men combine: The Star Route scandal and the twilight of Gilded Age politics. Louisiana State University Press.
- Reeves, T. C. (1969a). Chester A. Arthur and campaign assessments in the election of 1880. The Historian, 31(4), 573–582. doi:10.1111/j.1540-6563.1969.tb00363.x
- Reeves, T. C. (1969b). Chester A. Arthur and the campaign of 1880. Political Science Quarterly, 84(4), 628–637. JSTOR 2147128
- Sutton, T. C. (2016). James A. Garfield. In K. Gormley (Ed.), The presidents and the Constitution: A living history (pp. 266–275). New York University Press. doi:10.18574/nyu/9781479872077.003.0023

== Death ==
- Clark, J. C. (1993). The murder of James A. Garfield: The president's last days and the trial and execution of his assassin. McFarland.
- Ehrhardt, J. D., Jr., O'Leary, J. P., & Nakayama, D. K. (2018). "Yes, I shot the president, but his physicians killed him." The assassination of President James A. Garfield. The American Surgeon, 84(11), 1711–1716. doi:10.1177/000313481808401123
- Fish, S. A. (1950). The death of President Garfield. Bulletin of the History of Medicine, 24(4), 378–392. JSTOR 44443544
- Menke, R. (2005). Media in America, 1881: Garfield, Guiteau, Bell, Whitman. Critical Inquiry, 31(3), 638–664. doi:10.1086/430988
- Millard, C. (2011). Destiny of the republic: A tale of madness, medicine, and the murder of a president. Doubleday.
- Peskin, A. (1977a). Charles Guiteau of Illinois: President Garfield's assassin. Journal of the Illinois State Historical Society, 70(2), 130–139. JSTOR 40194544
- Peskin, A. (2000b). Guiteau, Charles Julius (1841–1882), assassin. In American national biography online. Oxford University Press. doi:10.1093/anb/9780198606697.article.0500928
- Rosen, F. (2016). Murdering the president: Alexander Graham Bell and the race to save James Garfield. Potomac Books. JSTOR j.ctt1d4v00p
- Rosenberg, C. E. (1968). The trial of the assassin Guiteau: Psychiatry and law in the Gilded Age. University of Chicago Press.
- Sewell, M. (1991). "All the English-speaking race is in mourning": The assassination of President Garfield and Anglo-American relations. The Historical Journal, 34(3), 665–686. JSTOR 2639567
- Tindall, W. (1920). Echoes of a surgical tragedy. Records of the Columbia Historical Society, Washington, D.C., 23, 147–166. JSTOR 40067142
- Weisbrod, C. (1989). Charles Guiteau and the Christian nation. Journal of Law and Religion, 7(1), 187–233. JSTOR 1051197
- Wolff, N. (2013). Emotional insanity, cynical reason, and "The Gilded Age". ELH, 80(1), 173–197. JSTOR 23356371

== Background ==
- Doenecke, J. D. (2017). Gilded Age presidents. In C. M. Nichols & N. C. Unger (Eds.), A companion to the Gilded Age and Progressive Era (pp. 269–283). Wiley. doi:10.1002/9781118913994.ch21
- Hoogenboom, A. (1961). Outlawing the spoils: A history of the civil service reform movement, 1865–1883. University of Illinois Press.
- Howe, G. F. (1931). The New York Custom-House controversy, 1877–1879. The Mississippi Valley Historical Review, 18(3), 350–363. JSTOR 1891404
- Jordan, D. M. (1971). Roscoe Conkling of New York: Voice in the Senate. Cornell University Press.
- Marcus, R. D. (1971). Grand Old Party: Political structure in the Gilded Age, 1880–1896. Oxford University Press.
- Maslin-Wicks, K. (2007). Forsaking transformational leadership: Roscoe Conkling, the great senator from New York. The Leadership Quarterly, 18(5), 463–476. doi:10.1016/j.leaqua.2007.07.003
- McKnight, B. D. (2006). Contested borderland: The Civil War in Appalachian Kentucky and Virginia. University Press of Kentucky.
- Peskin, A. (1984). Who were the Stalwarts? Who were their rivals? Republican factions in the Gilded Age. Political Science Quarterly, 99(4), 703–716. JSTOR 2150708
- Reeves, T. C. (1975). Gentleman Boss: The life of Chester Alan Arthur. Alfred A. Knopf.
- Wheatley, J. (2026). American fanatics: Religion, rebellion, and empire in the nineteenth century (ch. 4, "The fanatic mind: Psychiatry, law, and the case of Charles Guiteau", pp. 91–115). New York University Press. doi:10.18574/nyu/9781479825479

== Historiography ==
- Calhoun, C. W. (2002). Reimagining the "lost men" of the Gilded Age: Perspectives on the late nineteenth century presidents. The Journal of the Gilded Age and Progressive Era, 1(3), 225–257. JSTOR 25144300
- Miller, W. R. (2002). The lost world of Gilded Age politics. The Journal of the Gilded Age and Progressive Era, 1(1), 49–67. JSTOR 25144285

== Primary sources ==
- A record of the post mortem examination of the body of President J. A. Garfield. (1881). BMJ, 2(1086), 657–659. doi:10.1136/bmj.2.1086.657
- Brown, H. J., & Williams, F. D. (Eds.). (1967–1981). The diary of James A. Garfield (Vols. 1–4). Michigan State University Press.
- Hinsdale, B. A. (Ed.). (1882). The works of James Abram Garfield (Vols. 1–2). J. R. Osgood.
- Hinsdale, M. L. (Ed.). (1949). Garfield-Hinsdale letters: Correspondence between James Abram Garfield and Burke Aaron Hinsdale. University of Michigan Press.
- Kirke, E., & Garfield, J. A. (1886). My campaign in East Kentucky. The North American Review, 143(361), 525–535. JSTOR 25101140
- Norris, J. D., & Shaffer, A. H. (Eds.). (1970). Politics and patronage in the Gilded Age: The correspondence of James A. Garfield and Charles E. Henry. State Historical Society of Wisconsin.
- Shaw, J. (Ed.). (1994). Crete and James: Personal letters of Lucretia and James Garfield. Michigan State University Press.
- Williams, F. D. (Ed.). (1964). The wild life of the army: Civil War letters of James A. Garfield. Michigan State University Press.

== See also ==
- Half-Breeds (politics) – Republican faction associated with Garfield and James G. Blaine
- James A. Garfield Memorial – the president's tomb at Lake View Cemetery, Cleveland
- Stalwarts (politics) – rival Republican faction led by Roscoe Conkling
