= Bibliography of Grover Cleveland =

- Grover Cleveland (1837–1908)
- Subject: Grover Cleveland
- Scope: Books, journal articles, book chapters
- Period covered: March 18, 1837 – June 24, 1908
- Languages: English
- Part of bibliography series about: President of the United States
- Related bibliographies: Bibliography of Chester A. Arthur; Bibliography of William McKinley; Bibliography of works on Ulysses S. Grant
- Related timelines: Timelines of the Grover Cleveland presidencies; Timeline of the Benjamin Harrison presidency
- Related outlines and indexes: List of bibliographies of presidents of the United States; List of presidents of the United States; Outline of the history of the United States

This is a select bibliography of academic level books and journal articles, published mainly after World War II about the life of Grover Cleveland and the historical context of his life.

Bibliography contains academic level English language books (including translations) and journal articles, published mainly post World War II. (Note: Works published before World War II should be limited to areas where there are no significant post-World War II books on the subject or when the work in question has significant historical merit.) Book entries may have references to reviews published in academic journals or major newspapers when these could be considered helpful. These reference reviews also function as a resource to find other works on this subject.

Works listed here are cited in the notes or bibliographies of scholarly sources. Each is published by an academic or major trade press, written by a recognized expert, or substantially reviewed in scholarly journals; borderline cases are omitted. A selection of primary sources is included. Many of the books below carry their own bibliographies; see Further reading section for longer ones, and External links section for historical sites and museums.

Citations follow APA style. (Note: Entries are in plain text APA 7 format without templates; templates are used only for reviews and notes.) Books have citations to academic journal or mainstream published reviews when available. For books only partly about the subject, give relevant chapter or section titles where useful and available. Translators of the original-language edition are included when possible. In cases where a title or name has appeared with more than one English spelling, the most recent published form is used and a footnote documents any earlier title under which the work appeared.

Stephen Grover Cleveland (March 18, 1837 – June 24, 1908) was the 22nd and 24th president of the United States, serving from 1885 to 1889 and from 1893 to 1897. A Democrat from New York, he was the first Democrat elected president after the American Civil War and the only president to serve two nonconsecutive terms. He had been mayor of Buffalo and governor of New York before his election in 1884.

Grover Cleveland's first tenure as president began on March 4, 1885, and ended on March 4, 1889, following his defeat by Benjamin Harrison in the 1888 presidential election; his second tenure began on March 4, 1893, and ended on March 4, 1897. The second term was dominated by the severe depression that began in 1893, by his repeal of the Sherman Silver Purchase Act, which split the Democratic Party, by his use of federal troops to break the Pullman Strike in 1894, and by his intervention in the boundary dispute between Venezuela and Britain.

== General biographies ==
- Brodsky, A. (2000). Grover Cleveland: A study in character. St. Martin's Press.
- Graff, H. F. (2002). Grover Cleveland. Times Books.
- Jeffers, H. P. (2000). An honest president: The life and presidencies of Grover Cleveland. W. Morrow.
- Merrill, H. S. (1957). Bourbon leader: Grover Cleveland and the Democratic Party. Little, Brown.
- Nevins, A. (1932). Grover Cleveland: A study in courage. Dodd, Mead.
- Tugwell, R. G. (1968). Grover Cleveland. Macmillan.

== Life before the presidency and family ==
- Blodgett, G. (1992). The emergence of Grover Cleveland: A fresh appraisal. New York History, 73(2), 133–168.
- Dunlap, A. (2009). Frank: The story of Frances Folsom Cleveland, America's youngest first lady. State University of New York Press.
- Kelley, R. (1966). Presbyterianism, Jacksonianism and Grover Cleveland. American Quarterly, 18(4), 615–636. JSTOR 2711386
- Lachman, C. (2011). A secret life: The lies and scandals of President Grover Cleveland. Skyhorse.

== Presidency ==
- Alexander, B. F. (2015). Coxey's army: Popular protest in the Gilded Age. Johns Hopkins University Press.
- Algeo, M. (2011). The president is a sick man: Wherein the supposedly virtuous Grover Cleveland survives a secret surgery at sea and vilifies the courageous newspaperman who dared expose the truth. Chicago Review Press.
- Aziz, S. R. (1995). The oral surgical operations of Grover Cleveland. Journal of Oral and Maxillofacial Surgery, 53(9), 1088–1090. doi:10.1016/0278-2391(95)90129-9
- Bard, M. (1985). Ideology and depression politics I: Grover Cleveland (1893–97). Presidential Studies Quarterly, 15(1), 77–88.
- Blake, N. M. (1942). Background of Cleveland's Venezuelan policy. The American Historical Review, 47(2), 259–277. JSTOR 1841667
- Blodgett, G. (1983). The political leadership of Grover Cleveland. South Atlantic Quarterly, 82(3), 288–299. doi:10.1215/00382876-82-3-288
- Calhoun, C. W. (2008). Minority victory: Gilded Age politics and the front porch campaign of 1888. University Press of Kansas.
- Durden, R. F. (1958). Grover Cleveland and the Bourbon Democracy. South Atlantic Quarterly, 57(3), 333–338. doi:10.1215/00382876-57-3-333
- Haeffele-Balch, S., & Storr, V. H. (2014). Grover Cleveland against the special interests. The Independent Review, 18(4), 581–596.
- Hammett, H. B. (1976). The Cleveland administration and Anglo-American naval friction in Hawaii, 1893–1894. Military Affairs, 40(1), 27–32. JSTOR 1986846
- Hoffman, K. S. (2002). "Going public" in the nineteenth century: Grover Cleveland's repeal of the Sherman Silver Purchase Act. Rhetoric & Public Affairs, 5(1), 57–77. doi:10.1353/rap.2002.0008
- Hollingsworth, J. R. (1963). The whirligig of politics: The democracy of Cleveland and Bryan. University of Chicago Press.
- Humphreys, R. A. (1967). Presidential address: Anglo-American rivalries and the Venezuela crisis of 1895. Transactions of the Royal Historical Society, 17, 131–164. JSTOR 3678723
- Irwin, D. A. (1998). Higher tariffs, lower revenues? Analyzing the fiscal aspects of "The Great Tariff Debate of 1888". The Journal of Economic History, 58(1), 59–72. doi:10.1017/s0022050700019884
- Klinghard, D. P. (2005). Grover Cleveland, William McKinley, and the emergence of the president as party leader. Presidential Studies Quarterly, 35(4), 736–760. doi:10.1111/j.1741-5705.2005.00274.x
- LaFeber, W. (1960). The American business community and Cleveland's Venezuelan message. The Business History Review, 34(4), 393–402. JSTOR 3111426
- LaFeber, W. (1961). The background of Cleveland's Venezuelan policy: A reinterpretation. The American Historical Review, 66(4), 947–967. JSTOR 1845865
- Lindsey, A. (1939). Paternalism and the Pullman strike. The American Historical Review, 44(2), 272–289. doi:10.1086/ahr/44.2.272
- Lindsey, A. (1942). The Pullman strike: The story of a unique experiment and of a great labor upheaval. University of Chicago Press.
- McFarland, G. W. (1963). The New York Mugwumps of 1884: A profile. Political Science Quarterly, 78(1), 40–58. JSTOR 2146666
- McWilliams, T. S. (1988). James H. Blount, the South, and Hawaiian annexation. Pacific Historical Review, 57(1), 25–46. JSTOR 3639673
- Murray, M., Pappas, T. N., & Powers, D. B. (2019). Maxillary prosthetics, speech impairment, and presidential politics: How Grover Cleveland was able to speak normally after his "secret" operation. The Surgery Journal, 6(1), e1–e6. doi:10.1055/s-0039-3400537
- Noyes, A. D. (1897a). The financial record of the second Cleveland administration. I. Political Science Quarterly, 12(2), 189–211. JSTOR 2140119
- Noyes, A. D. (1897b). The financial record of the second Cleveland administration. II. Political Science Quarterly, 12(4), 561–588. JSTOR 2139685
- Osborne, T. J. (1981a). "Empire can wait": American opposition to Hawaiian annexation, 1893–1898. Kent State University Press.
- Osborne, T. J. (1981b). Trade or war? America's annexation of Hawaii reconsidered. Pacific Historical Review, 50(3), 285–307. JSTOR 3639601
- Papke, D. R. (1999). The Pullman case: The clash of labor and capital in industrial America. University Press of Kansas.
- Prout, J. (2013). Hope, fear, and confusion: Coxey's arrival in Washington. Washington History, 25, 1–19.
- Reitano, J. (1994). The tariff question in the Gilded Age: The great debate of 1888. Pennsylvania State University Press.
- Rezneck, S. (1953). Unemployment, unrest, and relief in the United States during the depression of 1893–97. Journal of Political Economy, 61(4), 324–345. doi:10.1086/257393
- Schneirov, R. (1999). "To the ragged edge of anarchy": The 1894 Pullman boycott. OAH Magazine of History, 13(3), 26–31. doi:10.1093/maghis/13.3.26
- Schneirov, R., Stromquist, S., & Salvatore, N. (Eds.). (1999). The Pullman strike and the crisis of the 1890s: Essays on labor and politics. University of Illinois Press.
- Schwantes, C. A. (1985). Coxey's army: An American odyssey. University of Nebraska Press.
- Simon, M. (1968). The Morgan-Belmont syndicate of 1895 and intervention in the foreign-exchange market. The Business History Review, 42(4), 385–417. JSTOR 3112526
- Skocpol, T. (1993). America's first social security system: The expansion of benefits for Civil War veterans. Political Science Quarterly, 108(1), 85–116. JSTOR 2152487
- Steeples, D., & Whitten, D. O. (1998). Democracy in desperation: The Depression of 1893. Greenwood Press.
- Summers, M. W. (2000). Rum, Romanism, and rebellion: The making of a president, 1884. University of North Carolina Press.
- Taussig, F. W. (1894). The Tariff Act of 1894. Political Science Quarterly, 9(4), 585–609. JSTOR 2139850
- Welch, R. E., Jr. (1988). The presidencies of Grover Cleveland. University Press of Kansas.

== Background ==
- Eggert, G. G. (1974). Richard Olney: Evolution of a statesman. Pennsylvania State University Press.
- Hoogenboom, A. (1961). Outlawing the spoils: A history of the civil service reform movement, 1865–1883. University of Illinois Press.
- LaFeber, W. (1963). The new empire: An interpretation of American expansion, 1860–1898. Cornell University Press.
- Merrill, H. S. (1953). Bourbon democracy of the Middle West, 1865–1896. Louisiana State University Press.
- Palen, M.-W. (2013). Foreign relations in the Gilded Age: A British free-trade conspiracy? Diplomatic History, 37(2), 217–247. doi:10.1093/dh/dht003
- Ritter, G. (1997). Goldbugs and greenbacks: The antimonopoly tradition and the politics of finance in America, 1865–1896. Cambridge University Press.
- Tate, M. (1965). The United States and the Hawaiian Kingdom: A political history. Yale University Press.
- Williams, R. H. (2010). Realigning America: McKinley, Bryan, and the remarkable election of 1896. University Press of Kansas.

== Historiography ==
- Blodgett, G. (1980). The Mugwump reputation, 1870 to the present. The Journal of American History, 66(4), 867–887. JSTOR 1887641
- Calhoun, C. W. (2002). Reimagining the "lost men" of the Gilded Age: Perspectives on the late nineteenth century presidents. The Journal of the Gilded Age and Progressive Era, 1(3), 225–257. doi:10.1017/s1537781400000244

== Primary sources ==
- Cleveland, G. (1892). The writings and speeches of Grover Cleveland (G. F. Parker, Ed.). Cassell.
- Cleveland, G. (1904). Presidential problems. Century.
- Keen, W. W. (1917). The surgical operations on President Cleveland in 1893. George W. Jacobs.
- Nevins, A. (Ed.). (1933). Letters of Grover Cleveland, 1850–1908. Houghton Mifflin.

== Academic journals related to subject ==
- The American Historical Review. (1895–present). Oxford University Press. Archive

== See also ==
- 1884 United States presidential election
- 1888 United States presidential election
- 1892 United States presidential election
- Bourbon Democrat
- Panic of 1893
- Pullman Strike
- Venezuelan crisis of 1895
