= Bibliography of Benjamin Harrison =

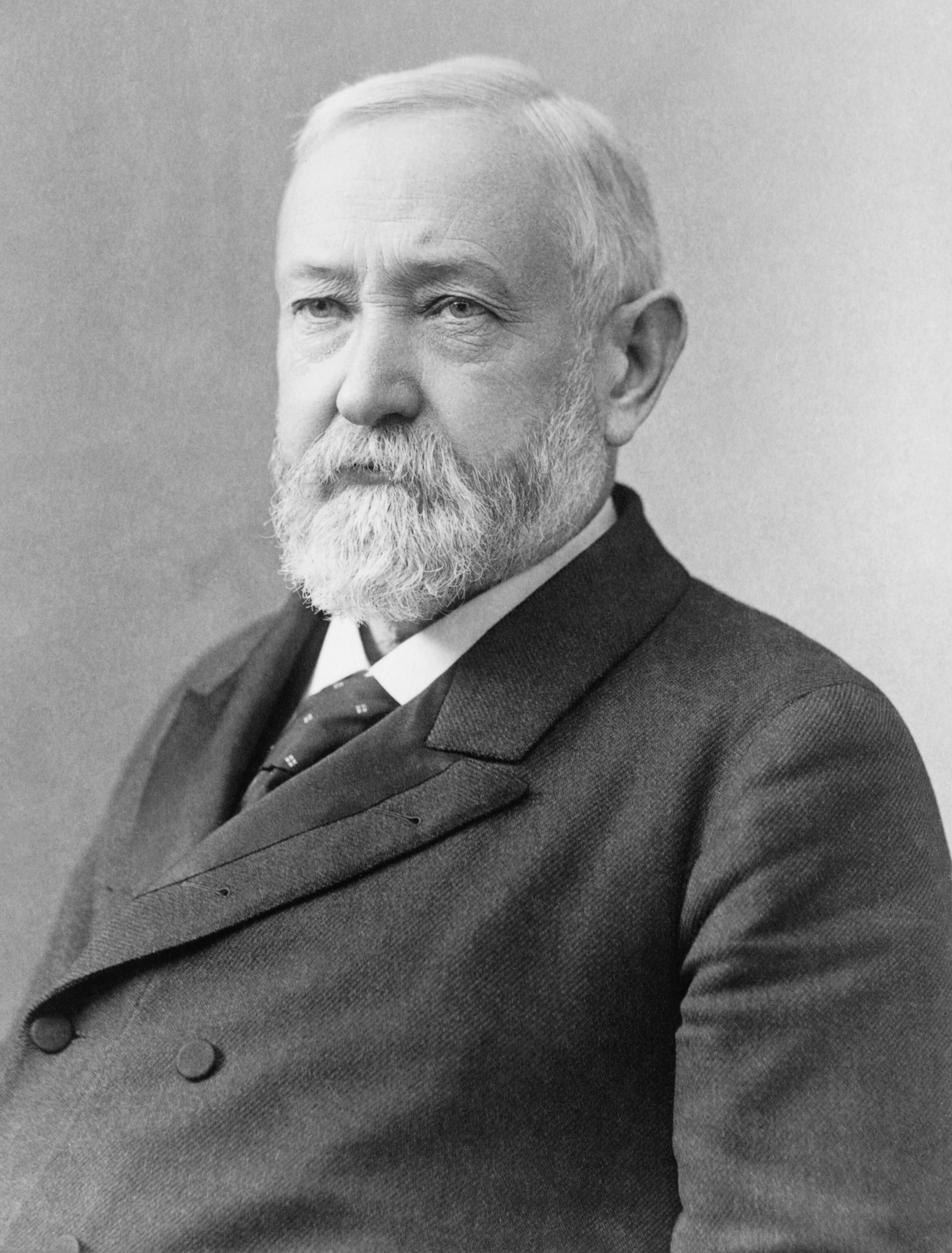
- Benjamin Harrison (1833–1901)
- Subject: Benjamin Harrison
- Scope: Books, journal articles, book chapters
- Period covered: August 20, 1833 – March 13, 1901
- Languages: English
- Part of bibliography series about: President of the United States
- Related bibliographies: Bibliography of Chester A. Arthur; Bibliography of William McKinley; Bibliography of the Reconstruction era
- Related timelines: Timeline of the Benjamin Harrison presidency; Timeline of the William McKinley presidency
- Related outlines and indexes: List of bibliographies of presidents of the United States; List of presidents of the United States; Outline of the history of the United States

This is a select bibliography of academic level books and journal articles about the life of Benjamin Harrison and the historical context of his life.

Benjamin Harrison (August 20, 1833 – March 13, 1901) was the 23rd president of the United States, serving from 1889 to 1893. He was a member of the Harrison family of Virginia—a grandson of the ninth president, William Henry Harrison, and a great-grandson of Benjamin Harrison V, a Founding Father. A Union army veteran and a Republican, he defeated Democratic Party incumbent Grover Cleveland to win the presidency in the 1888 United States presidential election by winning the Electoral College while losing the popular vote. He was defeated by Cleveland in the 1892 United States presidential election, becoming the first president to be succeeded in office by his predecessor.

Harrison's tenure as the president of the United States began on March 4, 1889, when he was inaugurated as the nation's 23rd president, and ended on March 4, 1893. Harrison, a Republican from Indiana, took office following his victory over Democratic incumbent President Grover Cleveland in the 1888 presidential election. His presidency ended following his re-election defeat in the 1892 presidential election to Cleveland, and became the first U.S. president to be succeeded in office by his predecessor.

Bibliography contains academic level English language books (including translations) and journal articles, published mainly post World War II. (Note: Works published before World War II should be limited to areas where there are no significant post-World War II books on the subject or when the work in question has significant historical merit.) Book entries may have references to reviews published in academic journals or major newspapers when these could be considered helpful. These reference reviews also function as a resource to find other works on this subject.

Works listed here are cited in the notes or bibliographies of scholarly sources. Each is published by an academic or major trade press, written by a recognized expert, or substantially reviewed in scholarly journals; borderline cases are omitted. A selection of primary sources is included. Many of the books below carry their own bibliographies; see Further reading section for longer ones, and External links section for historical sites and museums.

Citations follow APA style. (Note: Entries are in plain text APA 7 format without templates; templates are used only for reviews and notes.) Books have citations to academic journal or mainstream published reviews when available. For books only partly about the subject, give relevant chapter or section titles where useful and available. Translators of the original-language edition are included when possible. In cases where a title or name has appeared with more than one English spelling, the most recent published form is used and a footnote documents any earlier title under which the work appeared.

== General biographies ==
- Calhoun, C. W. (2005). Benjamin Harrison. Times Books.
- Sievers, H. J. (1952). Benjamin Harrison: Hoosier warrior, 1833–1865. Henry Regnery.
- Sievers, H. J. (1959). Benjamin Harrison: Hoosier statesman, from the Civil War to the White House, 1865–1888. University Publishers.
- Sievers, H. J. (1968). Benjamin Harrison: Hoosier president: The White House and after, 1889–1901. Bobbs-Merrill.

== Life before the presidency and family ==
- Anthony, C. S. (1992). First ladies: The saga of the presidents' wives and their power, 1789–1961. Quill.
- Epstein, E. R. (1971). The east and west wings of the White House. Records of the Columbia Historical Society, Washington, D.C., 71/72, 596–617.
- Gould, L. L. (Ed.). (1996). American first ladies: Their lives and their legacy. Garland Publishing.
- Lopez, G., & Bakken, D. (2017). Guns, puzzles, and selfies: Curating the "New Women of the Harrison Era" exhibition. Indiana Magazine of History, 113(2). doi:10.2979/indimagahist.113.2.04
- Thornton, W. W. (1902). Benjamin Harrison as a lawyer and an orator. The Green Bag, 14, 49–57.

== Presidency ==
- Baker, G. W. Jr. (1964). Benjamin Harrison and Hawaiian annexation: A reinterpretation. Pacific Historical Review, 33(3), 295–309. JSTOR 3636837
- Bourdon, J. N. (2014). Trains, canes, and replica log cabins: Benjamin Harrison's 1888 front-porch campaign for the presidency. Indiana Magazine of History, 110(3). doi:10.5378/indimagahist.110.3.0246
- Bourdon, J. N. (2019). From Garfield to Harding: The success of Midwestern front porch campaigns. Kent State University Press.
- Calhoun, C. W. (2008). Minority victory: Gilded Age politics and the front porch campaign of 1888. University Press of Kansas.
- Campbell, C. S. Jr. (1961). The Anglo-American crisis in the Bering Sea, 1890–1891. The Mississippi Valley Historical Review, 48(3), 393–414.
- Dozer, D. M. (1948). Benjamin Harrison and the presidential campaign of 1892. The American Historical Review, 54(1), 49–77. JSTOR 1841756
- Fischer, R. A. (1991). "Blocks of five" Dudley, cartoon celebrity. Indiana Magazine of History, 87(4), 334–347.
- Genetin-Pilawa, C. J. (2015). "Friends" and fistfights: Federal Indian policy debates and late nineteenth-century state development. The Journal of the Gilded Age and Progressive Era, 14(4), 512–520.
- Going, A. J. (1957). The South and the Blair education bill. The Mississippi Valley Historical Review, 44(2), 267–290.
- Goldberg, J. S. (1986). The Baltimore affair. University of Nebraska Press.
- Grandy, C. (1993). Original intent and the Sherman Antitrust Act: A re-examination of the consumer-welfare hypothesis. The Journal of Economic History, 53(2), 359–376. doi:10.1017/s0022050700012973
- Irwin, D. A. (1998). Higher tariffs, lower revenues? Analyzing the fiscal aspects of "The Great Tariff Debate of 1888". The Journal of Economic History, 58(1), 59–72. doi:10.1017/s0022050700019884
- Johnson, R. L. (2011). "Great injustice": Social status and the distribution of military pensions after the Civil War. The Journal of the Gilded Age and Progressive Era, 10(2), 137–160.
- Kinzer, D. L. (1977). Benjamin Harrison and the politics of availability. In R. D. Gray (Ed.), Gentlemen from Indiana: National party candidates, 1836–1940 (pp. 141–169). Indiana Historical Bureau.
- Letwin, W. (1965). Law and economic policy in America: The evolution of the Sherman Antitrust Act. Random House.
- McConarty, C. (2020). The Federal Elections Bill of 1890: The continuation of Reconstruction in America. The Journal of the Gilded Age and Progressive Era, 19(3), 390–405.
- McMurry, D. L. (1926). The Bureau of Pensions during the administration of President Harrison. The Mississippi Valley Historical Review, 13(3), 343–364. JSTOR 1893111
- Miller, J. E. (1990). More than statehood on their minds: South Dakota joins the Union, 1889. Great Plains Quarterly, 10(4), 206–217.
- Palen, M.-W. (2010). Protection, federation and union: The global impact of the McKinley tariff upon the British Empire, 1890–94. The Journal of Imperial and Commonwealth History, 38(3), 395–418. doi:10.1080/03086534.2010.503395
- Pratt, D. O. (2018). Sowing the wind: The Mississippi constitutional convention of 1890. University Press of Mississippi.
- Reitano, J. (1994). The tariff question in the Gilded Age: The great debate of 1888. Pennsylvania State University Press.
- Richardson, H. C. (2010). Wounded Knee: Party politics and the road to an American massacre. Basic Books.
- Sinkler, G. (1969). Benjamin Harrison and the matter of race. Indiana Magazine of History, 65(3), 197–213.
- Socolofsky, H. E., & Spetter, A. B. (1987). The presidency of Benjamin Harrison. University Press of Kansas.
- Spetter, A. B. (1969). Harrison and Blaine: Foreign policy, 1889–1893. Indiana Magazine of History, 65(3), 214–227.
- Spetter, A. B. (1981). Harrison and Blaine: No reciprocity for Canada. Canadian Review of American Studies, 12(2), 143–156. doi:10.3138/cras-012-02-01
- Timberlake, R. H. Jr. (1978). Repeal of silver monetization in the late nineteenth century. Journal of Money, Credit and Banking, 10(1), 27–45.
- Upchurch, T. A. (2004). Legislating racism: The billion dollar Congress and the birth of Jim Crow. University Press of Kentucky.
- Utley, R. M. (2004). The last days of the Sioux Nation (2nd ed.). Yale University Press.
- Volwiler, A. T. (1938). Harrison, Blaine, and American foreign policy, 1889–1893. Proceedings of the American Philosophical Society, 79(4), 637–648.
- Welch, R. E. (1965). The Federal Elections Bill of 1890: Postscripts and prelude. The Journal of American History, 52(3), 511–526. JSTOR 1890845

== Life after the presidency ==
- Child, C. J. (1950). The Venezuela–British Guiana boundary arbitration of 1899. American Journal of International Law, 44(4), 682–693. JSTOR 2194986

== Background ==
- Calhoun, C. W. (2006). Conceiving a new republic: The Republican Party and the southern question, 1869–1900. University Press of Kansas.
- Calhoun, C. W. (2010). From bloody shirt to full dinner pail: The transformation of politics and governance in the Gilded Age. Hill and Wang.
- Crapol, E. P. (2000). James G. Blaine: Architect of empire. Scholarly Resources.
- Hirshson, S. P. (1962). Farewell to the bloody shirt: Northern Republicans and the southern Negro, 1877–1893. Indiana University Press.
- Jensen, R. J. (1971). The winning of the Midwest: Social and political conflict, 1888–1896. University of Chicago Press.
- Kehl, J. A. (1981). Boss rule in the Gilded Age: Matt Quay of Pennsylvania. University of Pittsburgh Press.
- Klotz, R. J. (2022). Thomas Brackett Reed: The Gilded Age Speaker who made the rules for American politics. University Press of Kansas.
- Krause, P. (1992). The battle for Homestead, 1880–1892: Politics, culture, and steel. University of Pittsburgh Press.
- LaFeber, W. (1963). The new empire: An interpretation of American expansion, 1860–1898. Cornell University Press.
- Osborne, T. J. (1981). "Empire can wait": American opposition to Hawaiian annexation, 1893–1898. Kent State University Press.
- Ostler, J. (2004). The Plains Sioux and U.S. colonialism from Lewis and Clark to Wounded Knee. Cambridge University Press.
- Schickler, E. (2001). Disjointed pluralism: Institutional innovation and the development of the U.S. Congress. Princeton University Press.
- Skocpol, T. (1992). Protecting soldiers and mothers: The political origins of social policy in the United States. Belknap Press of Harvard University Press.
- Tate, M. (1968). Hawaii: Reciprocity or annexation. Michigan State University Press.
- Tyler, A. F. (1927). The foreign policy of James G. Blaine. University of Minnesota Press.
- Wang, X. (1997). The trial of democracy: Black suffrage and Northern Republicans, 1860–1910. University of Georgia Press.
- West, S. A. (2020). Remembering Reconstruction in its twilight: Ulysses S. Grant and James G. Blaine on the origins of Black suffrage. The Journal of the Civil War Era, 10(4), 495–523. doi:10.1353/cwe.2020.0071

== Historiography ==
- Calhoun, C. W. (2002). Reimagining the "lost men" of the Gilded Age: Perspectives on the late nineteenth century presidents. The Journal of the Gilded Age and Progressive Era, 1(3), 225–257. doi:10.1017/s1537781400000244
- Miller, W. R. (2002). The lost world of Gilded Age politics. The Journal of the Gilded Age and Progressive Era, 1(1), 49–67.
- Nichols, D. A. (2021). Telling Hoosier stories: The Benjamin Harrison Presidential Site and the significance of presidential ceremony. Indiana Magazine of History, 117(4), 296–305. doi:10.2979/indimagahist.117.4.03
- Taylor, M. Z. (2023). Benjamin Harrison, patriot and partisan. In Presidential leadership in feeble times (pp. 271–298). Oxford University Press. doi:10.1093/oso/9780197750742.003.0013

== Primary sources ==
- Harrison, B. (1897). This country of ours. Charles Scribner's Sons.
- Harrison, B. (1901). Views of an ex-president. Bowen-Merrill.
- Hedges, C. (Comp.). (1892). Speeches of Benjamin Harrison, twenty-third President of the United States. United States Book Company.
- Sievers, H. J. (1969). Benjamin Harrison, 1833–1901. Oceana Publications.
- Volwiler, A. T. (Ed.). (1940). The correspondence between Benjamin Harrison and James G. Blaine, 1882–1893. American Philosophical Society.
- Wright, M. (1961). The Benjamin Harrison papers. Quarterly Journal of Current Acquisitions, 18(3), 121–125.

== See also ==
- 1888 United States presidential election
- 1892 United States presidential election
- Lodge Bill – bill to protect Black voting rights
- McKinley Tariff – the 1890 protective tariff act
- Sherman Antitrust Act – the 1890 federal antitrust statute
- Sherman Silver Purchase Act – the 1890 silver coinage compromise
- Wounded Knee Massacre – the December 1890 killings on Pine Ridge
