= Bibliography of James Madison =

This bibliography of James Madison is a list of published works about James Madison, the 4th president of the United States.

== Biographies ==
- Banning, Lance (1995). The Sacred Fire of Liberty: James Madison and the Founding of the Federal Republic. Cornell University Press. ISBN 978-0801485244.
- —— (1952). "James Madison and His Times". American Historical Review. 57 (4): 853–870. doi:10.2307/1844238. JSTOR 1844238.
- —— (1941–1961). James Madison. 6 volumes. Indianapolis, Bobbs-Merrill., the standard scholarly biography
- —— (1970). The Fourth President; a Life of James Madison. Easton Press. single volume condensation of 6-vol biography
- Broadwater, Jeff. (2012). James Madison: A Son of Virginia and a Founder of a Nation. University of North Carolina Press. ISBN 9780807835302.
- Brookhiser, Richard. (2011). James Madison. Basic Books.
- Burstein, Andrew; Isenberg, Nancy (2010). Madison and Jefferson. Random House.
- Chadwick, Bruce. (2014). James and Dolley Madison: America's First Power Couple. Prometheus Books. detailed popular history
- Cheney, Lynne (2014). James Madison: A Life Reconsidered. Viking. ISBN 978-0-143-12703-1.
- Feldman, Noah (2017). The Three Lives of James Madison: Genius, Partisan, President. Random House. ISBN 978-0-812-99275-5.
- Gay, Sydney Howard (1894). James Madison. Houghton, Mifflin and Company. Ebook
- Gutzman, Kevin (2012). James Madison and the Making of America. St. Martin's Press. ISBN 978-1-429-94100-6.
- Ketcham, Ralph (1990). James Madison: A Biography. Univ. of Virginia Press. ISBN 978-0813912653., scholarly biography; paperback ed.
- Labunski, Richard (2006). James Madison and the Struggle for the Bill of Rights. Oxford Univ. Press.
- McCoy, Drew R. (1989). The Last of the Fathers: James Madison and the Republican Legacy. Cambridge University Press.
- Matthews, Richard K. (1995). If Men Were Angels : James Madison and the Heartless Empire of Reason. University Press of Kansas. ISBN 9780700606436.
- Rosen, Gary (1999). American Compact: James Madison and the Problem of Founding. University Press of Kansas.
- Rutland, Robert A. (1987). James Madison: The Founding Father. Macmillan Publishing Co. ISBN 978-0029276013.
- —— (1990). The Presidency of James Madison. Univ. Press of Kansas. ISBN 978-0700604654. scholarly overview of his two terms.
- ——, ed. (1994). James Madison and the American Nation, 1751–1836: An Encyclopedia. Simon & Schuster. ISBN 0-135-08425-3.
- Stewart, David (2007). The Summer of 1787: The Men Who Invented the Constitution. Simon and Schuster.
- —— (2016). Madison's Gift: Five Partnerships That Built America. Simon & Schuster. ISBN 978-0-74328-6930.
- Rakove, Jack (2002). James Madison and the Creation of the American Republic (2nd ed.). Longman. ISBN 978-0-32108-7973.
- Riemer, Neal (1968). James Madison. Washington Square Press.
- Wills, Garry (2015). James Madison: The American Presidents Series: The 4th President, 1809–1817. Times Books.
- Zuckert, Michael (2008). "Madison, James (1750–1836)". In Hamowy, Ronald (ed.). The Encyclopedia of Libertarianism. Thousand Oaks, CA: Sage; Cato Institute. pp. 311–312. doi:10.4135/9781412965811.n187. ISBN 978-1412965804. LCCN 2008009151. OCLC 750831024.

== Analytic studies ==
- Banning, Lance (1995). Jefferson & Madison: Three Conversations from the Founding. Madison House.
- Bilder, Mary Sarah (2015). Madison's Hand: Revising the Constitutional Convention. Harvard University Press. ISBN 978-0-6744-9550-0.
- Bogus, Carl T. (2023). Madison's Militia: The Hidden History of the Second Amendment. Oxford University Press. ISBN 978-0197632222.
- Bordewich, Fergus M. (2016). The First Congress: How James Madison, George Washington, and a Group of Extraordinary Men Invented the Government. Simon and Schuster.
- Brant, Irving (1968). James Madison and American Nationalism. Van Nostrand Co. short survey with primary sources
- Dragu, Tiberiu; Fan, Xiaochen; Kuklinski, James (March 2014). "Designing checks and balances". Quarterly Journal of Political Science. 9 (1). Now Publishing Inc.: 45–86. doi:10.1561/100.00013022. S2CID 155645300.
- Elkins, Stanley M.; McKitrick, Eric. (1995). The Age of Federalism. Oxford University Press.
- Everdell, William (2000). The End of Kings: A History of Republics and Republicans. Univ. of Chicago Press. ISBN 9780226224824.
- Gabrielson, Teena (September 2009). "James Madison's Psychology of Public Opinion". Political Research Quarterly. 62 (3): 431–444. doi:10.1177/1065912908319607. S2CID 144437111.
- Harbert, Earl, ed. (1986). Henry Adams: History of the United States during the Administrations of James Madison. Library of America.
- Kasper, Eric T. (2010). To Secure the Liberty of the People: James Madison's Bill of Rights and the Supreme Court's Interpretation. Northern Illinois University Press.
- Kernell, Samuel, ed. (2003). James Madison: the Theory and Practice of Republican Government. Stanford Univ. Press.
- Kester, Scott J. (2008). The Haunted Philosophe: James Madison, Republicanism, and Slavery. Lexington Books.
- McCoy, Drew R. (1980). The Elusive Republic: Political Economy in Jeffersonian America. W.W. Norton.
- Muñoz, Vincent Phillip. (February 2003). "James Madison's Principle of Religious Liberty". American Political Science Review. 97 (1): 17–32. doi:10.1017/S0003055403000492. S2CID 73579783. SSRN 512922.
- Read, James H. (2000). Power Versus Liberty: Madison, Hamilton, Wilson and Jefferson. Univ. Press of Virginia.
- Riemer, Neal (March 1954). "The Republicanism of James Madison". Political Science Quarterly. 69 (1): 45–64. doi:10.2307/2145057. JSTOR 2145057.
- Riemer, Neal (1986). James Madison: Creating the American Constitution. Congressional Quarterly. ISBN 9780871874054.
- Scarberry, Mark S. (April 2009). "John Leland and James Madison: Religious Influence on the Ratification of the Constitution and on the Proposal of the Bill of Rights". Penn State Law Review. 113 (3): 733–800.
- Sheehan, Colleen A. (October 1992). "The Politics of Public Opinion: James Madison's 'Notes on Government". William and Mary Quarterly. 49 (3): 609–627. doi:10.2307/2947174. JSTOR 2947174.
- Sheehan, Colleen (October 2002). "Madison and the French Enlightenment". William and Mary Quarterly. 59 (4): 925–956. doi:10.2307/3491576. JSTOR 3491576.
- Sheehan, Colleen (August 2004). "Madison v. Hamilton: The Battle Over Republicanism and the Role of Public Opinion". American Political Science Review. 98 (3): 405–424. doi:10.1017/S0003055404001248. S2CID 145693742.
- Sheehan, Colleen (2015). The Mind of James Madison: The Legacy of Classical Republicanism. Cambridge Univ. Press.
- Sheehan, Colleen (Winter 2005). "Public Opinion and the Formation of Civic Character in Madison's Republican Theory". Review of Politics. 67 (1): 37–48. doi:10.1017/S0034670500043308. S2CID 149775502.
- Sorenson, Leonard R. (1995). Madison on the General Welfare of America: His Consistent Constitutional Vision. Rowman & Littlefield Publishers.
- Stagg, John C. A. (October 1976). "James Madison and the Malcontents: The Political Origins of the War of 1812". William and Mary Quarterly. 33 (4): 557–585. doi:10.2307/1921716. JSTOR 1921716.
- Stagg, John C. A. (January 1981). "James Madison and the Coercion of Great Britain: Canada, the West Indies, and the War of 1812". William and Mary Quarterly. 38 (1): 3–34. doi:10.2307/1916855. JSTOR 1916855.
- Vile, John R.; Pederson, William D.; Williams, Frank J., eds. (2008). James Madison: Philosopher, Founder, and Statesman. Ohio Univ. Press.
- Weiner, Greg. (2012). Madison's Metronome: The Constitution, Majority Rule, and the Tempo of American Politics. Univ. Press of Kansas. ISBN 978-0-70062-8957.
- White, Leonard D. (1967). The Jeffersonians: A Study in Administrative History, 1801–1829. Macmillan.
- Will, George F. (January 23, 2008). "Alumni who changed America, and the world: #1 – James Madison 1771". Princeton Alumni Weekly.
- Wills, Garry (2005). Henry Adams and the Making of America. Houghton Mifflin. ISBN 9780618134304.
- Woodward, C. Vann, ed. (1974). Responses of the Presidents to Charges of Misconduct. Dell Publishing.

== Historiography ==
- Leibiger, Stuart, ed. (2013). A Companion to James Madison and James Monroe. John Wiley and Sons.
- Wood, Gordon S. (2006). Is There a 'James Madison Problem'?. Penguin Press.

== Primary sources ==
- Madison, James (1962). Hutchinson, William T. (ed.). The Papers of James Madison (30 volumes published and more planned ed.). Univ. of Chicago Press. Archived from the original on October 13, 2011.; The main scholarly edition
  - "Founders Online," searchable edition
- Madison, James (1865). Letters & Other Writings Of James Madison Fourth President Of The United States (called the Congress edition ed.). J.B. Lippincott & Co.
- Madison, James (1900–1910). Hunt, Gaillard (ed.). The Writings of James Madison. G. P. Putnam's Sons.
- Madison, James (1982). Cooke, Jacob E. (ed.). The Federalist. Wesleyan Univ. Press.
- Madison, James (1987). Notes of Debates in the Federal Convention of 1787 Reported by James Madison. W.W. Norton.
- Madison, James (1995). Myers, Marvin (ed.). Mind of the Founder: Sources of the Political Thought of James Madison. Univ. Press of New England.
- Madison, James (1995). Smith, James M. (ed.). The Republic of Letters: The Correspondence Between Thomas Jefferson and James Madison, 1776–1826. W.W. Norton.
- Madison, James (1999). Rakove, Jack N. (ed.). James Madison, Writings. Library of America.
- Richardson, James D., ed. (1897). A Compilation of the Messages and Papers of the Presidents, vol. xix. reprints his major messages and reports.

== See also ==
- Bibliography of the United States Constitution
