= Carl Bogus =

American researcher

Carl T. Bogus (born May 14, 1948, in Fall River, Massachusetts) is an author and Distinguished Research Professor of Law at Roger Williams University School of Law in Rhode Island.

== Education and career ==
Bogus received both his J.D. and A.B. degrees from Syracuse University. He joined the faculty of Roger Williams University School of Law in 1996 as an associate professor, and became a full professor there in 2002.

== Work ==
Bogus is known for his work on antitrust law and the Second Amendment to the United States Constitution. He has written three books: Why Lawsuits Are Good for America: Big Business, Disciplined Democracy and the Common Law (NYU Press 2001), Buckley: William F. Buckley Jr. and the Rise of American Conservatism (Bloomsbury Press 2011), and Madison's Militia: The Hidden History of the Second Amendment (Oxford University Press 2023).

Despite Bogus being politically liberal, he admires Buckley's wit and personality.

== Honors and awards ==
Bogus has received the Ross Essay Award from the American Bar Association and the Public Service Achievement Award from Common Cause of Rhode Island.

== Personal life ==
Bogus is married to Cynthia J. Giles, with whom he has three children. He enjoys playing chess in his spare time.
