= Bibliography of William Howard Taft =

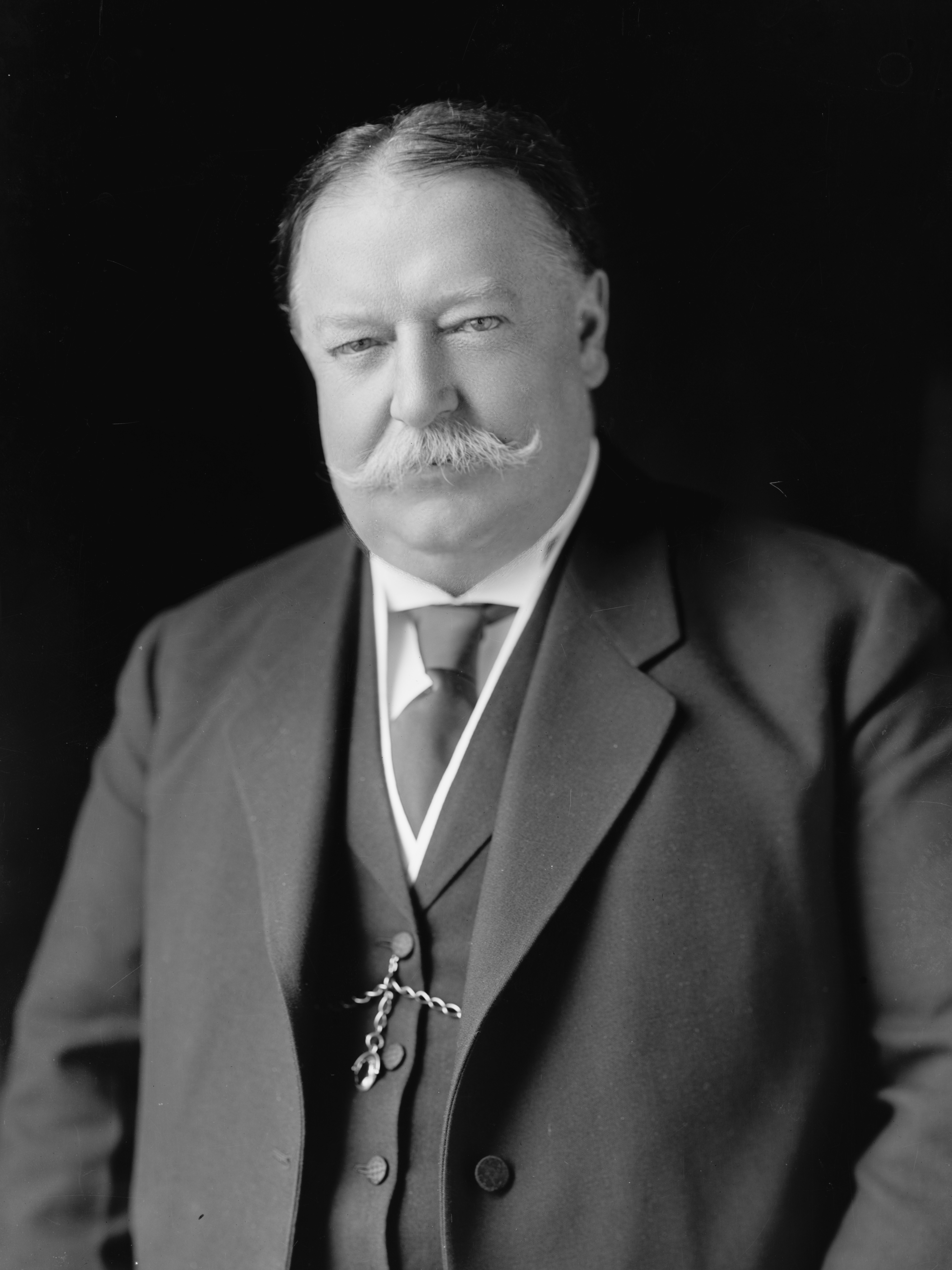
Portrait by Harris & Ewing

The following are some of the books and papers which have been written concerning William Howard Taft, the 27th president of the United States:

== General sources ==
- Abraham, Henry J. (1992). Justices and Presidents: A Political History of Appointments to the Supreme Court (3rd ed.). New York: Oxford University Press. ISBN 0-19-506557-3.
- Anderson, Judith Icke (1981). William Howard Taft: An Intimate History. New York: W. W. Norton & Company. ISBN 9780393014624.
- Anthony, Carl Sferrazza (2005). Nellie Taft: The Unconventional First Lady of the Ragtime Era. New York: William Morrow. ISBN 9780060513825.
- Bromley, Michael L. (2003). William Howard Taft and the First Motoring Presidency. Jefferson, North Carolina: McFarland and Company. ISBN 9780786414758.
- Burns, Adam D. "Adapting to Empire: William H. Taft, Theodore Roosevelt, and the Philippines, 1900-08," Comparative American Studies 11 (Dec. 2013), 418-33.
- Burns, Adam D. "Retentionist in Chief: William Howard Taft and the Question of Philippine Independence, 1912-1916." Philippine Studies: Historical and Ethnographic Viewpoints 61#2 (2013): 163-192. online
- Burton, David Henry. William Howard Taft: Confident Peacemaker (St. Joseph's University Press, 2004).
- Burton, David H. "The Learned Presidency: Roosevelt, Taft, Wilson." Presidential Studies Quarterly 15#3 (1985): 486-497.
- Burton, David H. (1998). Taft, Holmes, and the 1920s Court: An Appraisal. Madison, New Jersey: Fairleigh Dickinson University Press. ISBN 9780838637685.
- Burton, David H. (2005). Taft, Roosevelt, and the Limits of Friendship. Madison, New Jersey: Fairleigh Dickinson University Press. ISBN 9780838640425.
- Chace, James (2004). 1912: Wilson, Roosevelt, Taft and Debs – The Election that Changed the Country. New York: Simon and Schuster. ISBN 9780743203944.
- Crowe, Justin. "The forging of judicial autonomy: Political entrepreneurship and the reforms of William Howard Taft." Journal of Politics 69.1 (2007): 73-87. online
- Conner, Valerie (1983). The National War Labor Board.
- Cushman, Clare (2001). The Supreme Court Justices: Illustrated Biographies, 1789–1995 (2nd ed.). (Supreme Court Historical Society, Congressional Quarterly Books). ISBN 978-1-56802-126-3.
- Escalante, Rene R. The Bearer of Pax Americana: The Philippine Career of William H. Taft, 1900-1903 (New Day Publishers, 2007).
- Frank, John P.; Leon Friedman; Fred L. Israel, editors (1995). The Justices of the United States Supreme Court: Their Lives and Major Opinions. Chelsea House Publishers. ISBN 978-0-7910-1377-9.
- Gould, Lewis L. (2010). The William Howard Taft Presidency.
- Hall, Kermit L., ed. (1992). The Oxford Companion to the Supreme Court of the United States. New York: Oxford University Press. ISBN 978-0-19-505835-2.
- Hammond, John Hays (1935). The Autobiography of John Hays Hammond. New York: Farrar & Rinehart. ISBN 978-0-405-05913-1.
- Harris, Charles H. III; Sadler, Louis R. (2009). The Secret War in El Paso: Mexican Revolutionary Intrigue, 1906-1920. Albuquerque, New Mexico: University of New Mexico Press. ISBN 978-0-8263-4652-0.
- Hechler, Kenneth S. (1940). Insurgency: Personalities and Politics of the Taft Era.
- Hicks, Frederick (1945). William Howard Taft, Yale Professor of Law & New Haven Citizen. New Haven: Yale University Press.
- Korzi, Michael J. (2003). Our chief magistrate and his powers: a reconsideration of William Howard Taft's "Whig" theory of presidential leadership.
- Lurie, Jonathan. William Howard Taft: The travails of a progressive conservative (Cambridge University Press, 2011).
- Manners, William (1969). TR and Will: A Friendship that Split the Republican Party. New York, Harcourt, Brace & World.
- Martin, Fenton S.; Goehlert, Robert U. (1990). The U.S. Supreme Court: A Bibliography. Washington, D.C.: Congressional Quarterly Books. ISBN 0-87187-554-3.
- Milkis, Sidney M. "William Howard Taft and the Struggle for the Soul of the Constitution." Toward an American Conservatism (Palgrave Macmillan, 2013) pp. 63–93.
- Minger, Ralph E. (1975). William Howard Taft and United States Diplomacy: The Apprenticeship Years. 1900–1908.
- Mossman, Billy C.; Stark, M. W. (1971). "Chapter II, Former President William Howard Taft State Funeral 8–11 March 1930". The last salute : civil and military funerals, 1921-1969. Washington, DC. Archived from the original on June 8, 2010.
- Morrisey, Will. The Dilemma of Progressivism: How Roosevelt, Taft, and Wilson Reshaped the American Regime of Self-government (Rowman & Littlefield Publishers, 2009).
- Noyes, John E. "William Howard Taft and the Taft Arbitration Treaties." Villanova Law Review 56 (2011): 535+. online
- Rooney, William H., and Timothy G. Fleming. "William Howard Taft, the Origin of the Rule of Reason, and the Actavis Challenge." Columbia Business Law review (2018): 1+. online
- Solvick, Stanley D. (December 1, 1963). "William Howard Taft and the Payne-Aldrich Tariff". Mississippi Valley Historical Review. 50 (3): 424–442. doi:10.2307/1902605. ISSN 0161-391X. JSTOR 1902605.
- Sternberg, Jonathan (2008). "Deciding Not to Decide: The Judiciary Act of 1925 and the Discretionary Court". Journal of Supreme Court History. 33 (1): 1–16. doi:10.1111/j.1540-5818.2008.00176.x. S2CID 13826487.
- Urofsky, Melvin I. (1994). The Supreme Court Justices: A Biographical Dictionary. New York: Garland Publishing. p. 590. ISBN 978-0-8153-1176-8.
- Warren, Charles (1928). The Supreme Court in United States History. Vol. 1. Boston: Little, Brown, and Company.
- Wilensky, Norman N. (1965). Conservatives in the Progressive Era: The Taft Republicans of 1912.

== Primary sources ==
- Butt, Archie (1930). Taft and Roosevelt: The Intimate Letters of Archie Butt. Garden City, New York: Doubleday, Doran and Company., military aide to Taft
- Republican campaign text-book 1912 (1912) online
- Taft, William Howard
  - Liberty Under Law. New Haven: Yale University Press. 1922.
  - Our Chief Magistrate and his Powers. New York City: Columbia University Press. 1916.
  - Popular Government. New Haven: Yale University Press. 1913.
  - Present Day Problems. New York City: Dodd, Mead and Company. 1908.
  - The Anti-Trust Act and the Supreme Court. New York City: Harper & Brothers. 1914.
  - Burton, David H., ed. (2001–2004). The Collected Works of William Howard Taft. Ohio University Press (8 volumes).
- Taft, Mrs. William Howard (1914). Recollections of Full Years.
- William Howard Taft at the Biographical Directory of Federal Judges, a publication of the Federal Judicial Center.
