= Bibliography of James Monroe =

The following is a list of important scholarly resources related to James Monroe, the fifth president of the United States. for a comprehensive older guide see Harry Ammon, James Monroe: A Bibliography (Greenwood, 1990).

== Secondary sources ==
- Ammon, Harry (1971). James Monroe: The Quest for National Identity. McGraw-Hill. ISBN 9780070015821. 706 pp. standard scholarly biography
- Ammon, Harry. "James Monroe" in Henry F. Graff ed., The Presidents: A Reference History (3rd ed. 2002) online
- Bemis, Samuel Flagg (1949). John Quincy Adams and the Foundations of American Foreign Policy. A. A. Knopf.
- Cresson, William P. James Monroe (1946). 577 pp. good scholarly biography
- Cunningham, Noble E., Jr. The Presidency of James Monroe. 1996. 246 pp. standard scholarly survey
- Dangerfield, George. Era of Good Feelings (1953) excerpt and text search
- Dangerfield, George (1965). The Awakening of American Nationalism: 1815–1828. Harper and Rowe. ISBN 0881338230.
- Elkins, Stanley M.; McKitrick, Eric (1995). The Age of Federalism. Archived from the original on April 20, 2010 – via Questia.
- Heidler, David S. "The Politics of National Aggression: Congress and the First Seminole War," Journal of the Early Republic 1993 13(4): 501–530. in JSTOR
- Finkelman, Paul, ed. Encyclopedia of the New American Nation, 1754–1829 (2005), 1600 pp.
- Hart, Gary (2005). James Monroe. Henry Holy and Co. ISBN 978-0805069600. superficial, short, popular biography
- Haworth, Peter Daniel. "James Madison and James Monroe Historiography: A Tale of Two Divergent Bodies of Scholarship." in A Companion to James Madison and James Monroe (2013): 521-539.
- Howe, Daniel Walker (2007). What Hath God Wrought: The Transformation of America, 1815–1848. Oxford Univ. Press. ISBN 978-0-19-507894-7. Pulitzer Prize; a sweeping interpretation of the era
- Holmes, David L. The Faiths of the Founding Fathers, May 2006, online version Archived 2013-10-24 at the Wayback Machine
- Johnson, Allen (1915). Union and Democracy. Boston: Houghton Mifflin Company.
- Kranish, Michael. "At Capitol, slavery's story turns full circle", The Boston Globe, Boston, December 28, 2008.
- Leibiger, Stuart, ed. A Companion to James Madison and James Monroe (2012) excerpt; emphasis on historiography
- McGrath, Tim. James Monroe: A Life (Dutton, 2020) 736pp0
- McManus, Michael J. “President James Monroe’s Domestic Policies, 1817–1825: ‘To Advance the Best Interests of Our Union,’” in A Companion to James Madison and James Monroe, ed. Stuart Leibiger (2013), 438–55.
- May, Ernest R. The Making of the Monroe Doctrine (1975), argues it was issued to influence the outcome of the presidential election of 1824.
- Perkins, Bradford. Castlereagh and Adams: England and the United States, 1812–1823 (1964)
- Perkins, Dexter. The Monroe Doctrine, 1823–1826 (1927), the standard monograph about the origins of the doctrine.
- Poston, Brook. "'Bolder Attitude': James Monroe, the French Revolution, and the Making of the Monroe Doctrine." Virginia Magazine of History and Biography 124.4 (2016): 282.
- Poston, Brook. James Monroe: A Republican Champion (University Press of Florida; 2019) excerpt
- Powell, Walter & Steinberg, Richard. The nonprofit sector: a research handbook, Yale, 2006, p. 40.
- Pulliam, David Loyd (1901). The Constitutional Conventions of Virginia from the foundation of the Commonwealth to the present time. John T. West, Richmond. ISBN 978-1-2879-2059-5.
- Renehan Edward J., Jr. The Monroe Doctrine: The Cornerstone of American Foreign Policy (2007)
- Scherr, Arthur. "James Monroe and John Adams: An Unlikely 'Friendship'". The Historian 67#3 (2005) pp 405+. online edition Archived 2011-06-23 at the Wayback Machine
- Skeen, Carl Edward. 1816: America Rising (1993) popular history
- Scherr, Arthur. "James Monroe on the Presidency and 'Foreign Influence: from the Virginia Ratifying Convention (1788) to Jefferson's Election (1801)." Mid-America 2002 84(1–3): 145–206. ISSN 0026-2927.
- Scherr, Arthur. "Governor James Monroe and the Southampton Slave Resistance of 1799." Historian 1999 61(3): 557–578. ISSN 0018-2370 Fulltext online in SwetsWise and Ebsco.
- Styron, Arthur. The Last of the Cocked Hats: James Monroe and the Virginia Dynasty (1945). 480 pp. thorough, scholarly treatment of the man and his times.
- Unger, Harlow G. (2009). The Last Founding Father: James Monroe and a Nation's Call to Greatness. Da Capo Press. Archived from the original on March 6, 2016. a new biography.
- Weeks, William Earl (1992). John Quincy Adams and American Global Empire. Lexington, KY: University of Kentucky Press. ISBN 9780813117799.
- White, Leonard D. The Jeffersonians: A Study in Administrative History, 1801–1829 (1951), explains the operation and organization of federal administration
- Whitaker, Arthur P. The United States and the Independence of Latin America (1941)
- Wilmerding, Jr., Lucius, James Monroe: Public Claimant (1960) A study regarding Monroe's attempts to get reimbursement for personal expenses and losses from his years in public service after his presidency ended.
- Wilentz, Sean (Fall 2004). "Jeffersonian Democracy and the Origins of Political Antislavery in the United States: The Missouri Crisis Revisited". The Journal of the Historical Society. IV (3).
- Wood, Gordon S. Empire of Liberty: A History of the Early Republic, 1789–1815 (2009)

== Primary sources ==
- Brown, Stuart Gerry, ed. The Autobiography of James Monroe (Syracuse Up, 2017); fragments of Monroe's unfinished autobiography,
- Preston, Daniel, ed. The Papers of James Monroe: Selected Correspondence and Papers (6 vol, 2006 to 2017), the major scholarly edition; in progress, with coverage to 1814.
- Monroe, James. The Political Writings of James Monroe. ed. by James P. Lucier, (2002). 863 pp.
- Writings of James Monroe, edited by Stanislaus Murray Hamilton, ed., 7 vols. (1898–1903) online edition at Google Books
- Richardson, James D. ed. A Compilation of the Messages and Papers of the Presidents (1897), reprints his major messages and reports.

== For children ==
- Venezia, Mike. James Monroe: Fifth President, 1817-1825 (Getting to Know the US Presidents) (2005)
