= Bibliography of Woodrow Wilson =

This bibliography of Woodrow Wilson is a list of published works about Woodrow Wilson, the 28th president of the United States. For a more comprehensive listing see Peter H. Buckingham, Woodrow Wilson: A bibliography of his times and presidency (Scholarly Resources Inc, 1990).

== Biographical ==
- Auchincloss, Louis. Woodrow Wilson (Viking, 2000)
- Berg, A. Scott. Wilson (2013), full-scale scholarly biography
- Blum, John. Woodrow Wilson and the Politics of Morality (1956); short scholarly biography
- Brands, H. W. Woodrow Wilson 1913–1921 (2003); short scholarly biography
- Cooper, John Milton. Woodrow Wilson: A Biography (2009), full-scale scholarly biography
- Hankins, Barry. Woodrow Wilson: Ruling Elder, Spiritual President (Oxford University Press, 2016).
- Heckscher, August (1991). Woodrow Wilson. Easton Press.
- Kennedy, Ross A., ed. A Companion to Woodrow Wilson (2013), comprehensive coverage
- Levin, Phyllis Lee (2001). Edith and Woodrow: The Wilson White House. Scribner. ISBN 0-7432-1158-8. - Wikipedia article on the book: Edith and Woodrow
- Link, Arthur S. "Woodrow Wilson" in Henry F. Graff ed., The presidents: A Reference History (2002) pp. 365–388; short scholarly biography
- Link, Arthur Stanley. Wilson: The Road to the White House (1947), first volume of standard biography (to 1917); Wilson: The New Freedom (1956); Wilson: The Struggle for Neutrality: 1914–1915 (1960); Wilson: Confusions and Crises: 1915–1916 (1964); Wilson: Campaigns for Progressivism and Peace: 1916–1917 (1965), the last volume of 5-volume standard scholarly biography
- Maynard, W. Barksdale. Woodrow Wilson: Princeton to the Presidency (2008)
- Miller, Kristie. Ellen and Edith: Woodrow Wilson's First Ladies (University Press of Kansas, 2010)
- O'Toole, Patricia (2018). The Moralist: Woodrow Wilson and the World He Made. Simon & Schuster. ISBN 978-0743298094.
- Post, Jerrold M. "Woodrow Wilson Re-Examined: The Mind-Body Controversy Redux and Other Disputations," Political Psychology (1983) 4#2 pp. 289–306 in JSTOR, on Wilson's self-defeating behavior
- Walworth, Arthur (1958). Woodrow Wilson, Volume I, II. Longmans, Green. Archived from the original on 2012-10-23 – via Questia.; full scale scholarly biography

== Scholarly topical studies ==
- Allerfeldt, Kristofer. "Wilsonian Pragmatism? Woodrow Wilson, Japanese Immigration, and the Paris Peace Conference." Diplomacy and Statecraft 15.3 (2004): 545–572.
- Ambrosius, Lloyd E. "Woodrow Wilson and George W. Bush: Historical Comparisons of Ends and Means in Their Foreign Policies", Diplomatic History, 30 (June 2006), 509–43.
- Ambrosius, Lloyd E. Woodrow Wilson and American Internationalism (Cambridge University Press, 2017) 270 pp.
- Ambrosius, Lloyd E. Wilsonian Statecraft: Theory and Practice of Liberal Internationalism During World War I (1991)
- Ambrosius, Lloyd E. "Woodrow Wilson and World War I." in A Companion to American Foreign Relations (2003): 149+.
- Bailey; Thomas A. Wilson and the Peacemakers: Combining Woodrow Wilson and the Lost Peace and Woodrow Wilson and the Great Betrayal (1947); detailed coverage of 1919; Lost Peace online -- deals with negotiations in Paris; Great Betrayal online; deals with battle in Washington
- Burnidge, Cara Lea. 2016. A Peaceful Conquest: Woodrow Wilson, Religion and the New World Order. University of Chicago Press.
- Clements, Kendrick, A. Woodrow Wilson: World Statesman (1999)
- Clements, Kendrick A. The Presidency of Woodrow Wilson (1992), a standard scholarly survey
- Clements, Kendrick A. "Woodrow Wilson and World War I", Presidential Studies Quarterly 34:1 (2004). pp. 62+
- Davis, Donald E. and Eugene P. Trani. The First Cold War: The Legacy of Woodrow Wilson in U.S.-Soviet Relations (2002) online
- Ferrell, Robert H. (1985). Woodrow Wilson and World War I, 1917-1921. Harper & Row. LCCN 84048160.
- Flanagan, Jason C. "Woodrow Wilson's" Rhetorical Restructuring": The Transformation of the American Self and the Construction of the German Enemy." Rhetoric & Public Affairs 7.2 (2004): 115-148. online
- Greene, Theodore P., ed. Wilson at Versailles (1957) essays by scholars and primary sources
- Hofstadter, Richard. "Woodrow Wilson: The Conservative as Liberal" in The American Political Tradition (1948), ch. 10.
- Janis, Mark Weston. "The John Sloan Dickey Essay on International Law: How Wilsonian Was Woodrow Wilson." Dartmouth Law Journal (2007): 1+. online
- Kazianis, Harry. "Woodrow Wilson: Civil War, Morality and Foreign Policy", E-International Relations (2011), E-ir.info
- Kennedy, Ross A., ed. A Companion to Woodrow Wilson (2013), historiographical essays by scholars
- Knock, Thomas J. To End All Wars: Woodrow Wilson and the Quest for a New World Order (1995)
- Levin, Jr., N. Gordon. Woodrow Wilson and World Politics: America's Response to War and Revolution (1968)
- Link, Arthur S. Woodrow Wilson and the Progressive Era, 1910–1917 (1972) standard political history of the era online
- Link, Arthur S. Wilson the Diplomatist: A Look at His Major Foreign Policies (1957) online
- Link, Arthur S. Woodrow Wilson and a Revolutionary World, 1913–1921 (1982)
- Livermore, Seward W. Woodrow Wilson and the War Congress, 1916–1918 (1966)
- Malin, James C. The United States after the World War (1930) online
- Manela, Erez. The Wilsonian moment: self-determination and the international origins of anticolonial nationalism (Oxford UP, 2007).
- Pestritto, Ronald J. Woodrow Wilson and the Roots of Modern Liberalism (2005)
- Ruiz, George W. "The Ideological Convergence of Theodore Roosevelt and Woodrow Wilson". Presidential Studies Quarterly (1989). 19#1: 159–177. online
- Schwabe, Klaus, and Rita Kimber. Woodrow Wilson, Revolutionary Germany, and peacemaking, 1918-1919: missionary diplomacy and the realities of power (University of North Carolina Press, 1985).
- Startt, James. Woodrow Wilson and the Press: Prelude to the presidency (Springer, 2004).
- Trani, Eugene P. "Woodrow Wilson and the Decision to Intervene in Russia: A Reconsideration". Journal of Modern History (1976). 48:440–61. in JSTOR
- Tucker, Robert W. Woodrow Wilson and the Great War: Reconsidering America's Neutrality, 1914–1917 (2007)
- Vought, Hans. "Woodrow Wilson, Ethnicity, and the Myth of American Unity". In Myth America: A Historical Anthology, Volume II. 1997. Gerster, Patrick, and Cords, Nicholas. (editors.) Brandywine Press, St. James, NY. ISBN 1-881-089-97-5
- Walworth, Arthur; Wilson and His Peacemakers: American Diplomacy at the Paris Peace Conference, 1919 (1986)
- Wolgemuth, Kathleen L. "Woodrow Wilson and federal segregation." Journal of Negro History 44.2 (1959): 158–173. online
- Wright, Esmond. "The Foreign Policy of Woodrow Wilson: A Re-Assessment. Part 1: Woodrow Wilson and the First World War" History Today. (Mar 1960) 10#3 pp 149–157
  - Wright, Esmond. "The Foreign Policy of Woodrow Wilson: A Re-Assessment. Part 2: Wilson and the Dream of Reason" History Today (Apr 1960) 19#4 pp 223–231
- Yellin, Eric S. Racism in the Nation's Service: Government Workers and the Color Line in Woodrow Wilson's America (2013)

=== The Princeton experience ===
- Axtell, James. The Making of Princeton University: From Woodrow Wilson to the Present (2006), passim.
- Axtell, James. "The Dilettante Dean and the Origins of the Princeton Graduate School," Princeton University Library Chronicle (2001) 62#2 pp. 238–261.
- Axtell, James, ed. The Educational Legacy of Woodrow Wilson: From College to Nation (U of Virginia Press, 2012) online.
- Axtell, James. "The Bad Dream." Princeton University Library Chronicle (2008) 69#3 pp. 400–436. Argues that Wilson never forgot or forgave the enemies who decisively defeated him on two major issues: replacing the elitist residential system and reducing the independence of the graduate school.
- Bradley, Stefan M. "The Southern-Most Ivy: Princeton University from Jim Crow Admissions to Anti-Apartheid Protests, 1794-1969." American Studies 51.3/4 (2010): 109-130 online.
- Bragdon, Henry. Woodrow Wilson: The Academic Years (1967)
- Clarke, Linda Lois. "Woodrow Wilson at Princeton: A study in leadership ideals" (PhD dissertation, The University of Iowa; ProQuest Dissertations Publishing, 1991. 9212860).
- Cooper, John Milton. Woodrow Wilson: A Biography (2009) pp 62–119.
- Cooper, John Milton. Woodrow Wilson: The Academic Man, Virginia Quarterly Review (1982) 58#1 pp. 38–53.
- Garraty, John A. "The Training of Woodrow Wilson" American Heritage ( Aug1956,) Vol. 7 Issue 5, p24+ short essay on Wilson at Princeton.
- Grafton, Anthony. "The Precept System: Myth and Reality of a Princeton Institution," Princeton University Library Chronicle (2002) 64#3 pp. 466–503.
- Link, Arthur S. Wilson: The Road to the White House (1947) 1:37-92.
- Maynard, W. Barksdale. Woodrow Wilson: Princeton to the Presidency (2008) online; popular history.
- Mulder, J.M. Woodrow Wilson: The Years of Preparation (Princeton UP, 1978) online
- O'Reilly, Kenneth. "The Jim Crow Policies of Woodrow Wilson". Journal of Blacks in Higher Education (1997). (17): 117–121. doi:10.2307/2963252.
- Potter, Edmund D. "Path to Power: Wilson as President of Princeton and Governor of New Jersey." in A Companion to Woodrow Wilson (2013): 55-70. online
- Rogal, Samuel J. "From Pedagogue to President: Thomas Woodrow Wilson as Teacher-Scholar." Presidential Studies Quarterly 24.1 (1994): 49-56. online
- Taggart, Robert J. "Woodrow Wilson and Curriculum Reform," New Jersey History (1975), Vol. 93 Issue 1/2, pp. 99–114.
- Veysey, Laurence R. "The academic mind of Woodrow Wilson." Mississippi Valley Historical Review 49#4 (1963): 613-634. online

==== Primary sources on Princeton ====
- Myers, William Starr. Woodrow Wilson: Some Princeton Memories (Princeton University Press, 2015) online
- Wilson, Woodrow. The Papers of Woodrow Wilson Volumes 1, 14–21, ed, by Arthur S. Link et al. (1972–76);
- Baker, Ray Stannard. Woodrow Wilson Life and Letters: Volume 2: Princeton 1890 – 1910 (Doubleday, 1927) biograohy and documents; online

=== Racial issues ===
- Allerfeldt, Kristofer. "Wilsonian Pragmatism? Woodrow Wilson, Japanese Immigration, and the Paris Peace Conference." Diplomacy and Statecraft 15.3 (2004): 545-572.
- Aneja, Abhay, and Guo Xu. "The costs of employment segregation: Evidence from the federal government under Woodrow Wilson." Quarterly Journal of Economics 137.2 (2022): 911-958. online
- Blumenthal, Henry. "Woodrow Wilson and the Race Question." Journal of Negro History 48.1 (1963): 1-21. online
- Bradley, Stefan M. "The Southern-Most Ivy: Princeton University from Jim Crow Admissions to Anti-Apartheid Protests, 1794-1969." American Studies 51.3/4 (2010): 109-130 online.
- Breen, William J. “Black Women and the Great War: Mobilization and Reform in the South.” Journal of Southern History 44#3 (1978), pp. 421–440. online
- Curry, George. “Woodrow Wilson, Jan Smuts, and the Versailles Settlement.” American Historical Review, 66#4, 1961, pp. 968–86. online
- Dennis, Michael. "Looking Backward: Woodrow Wilson, the New South, and the Question of Race." American Nineteenth Century History 3.1 (2002): 77-104.
- Dennis, Michael. "Race and the Southern Imagination: Woodrow Wilson Reconsidered." Canadian Review of American Studies 29.3 (1999): 109-132.
- Dickinson, Frederick R. "More than a ‘moment’: Woodrow Wilson and the foundations of twentieth century Japan." Japanese Journal of Political Science 19.4 (2018): 587-599.
- Ellis, Mark. “‘Closing Ranks’ and ‘Seeking Honors’: W. E. B. Du Bois in World War I.” Journal of American History 79#1 (1992), pp. 96–124. online
- Filozof, Michael Francis. "Woodrow Wilson and international human rights" (PhD dissertation, State University of New York at Buffalo; ProQuest Dissertations Publishing, 2000. 9958260).
- Finley, Randy. "Black Arkansans and World War One." Arkansas Historical Quarterly 49#3 (1990): 249-77. doi:10.2307/40030800.
- Glazier, Kenneth M. "W.E.B. Du Bois' Impressions of Woodrow Wilson." Journal of Negro History 58.4 (1973): 452-453 online.
- Green, Cleveland M. "Prejudices and Empty Promises: Woodrow Wilson’s Betrayal of the Negro, 1910–1919." The Crisis (1980) 87#9, pp 380–387.
- Hamel, William Christopher. "Race and responsible government: Woodrow Wilson and the Philippines" (PhD dissertation, Michigan State University; ProQuest Dissertations Publishing, 2002. 3075014).
- Hankins, Barry, Woodrow Wilson: Ruling Elder, Spiritual President (Oxford University Press, 2018)
- Hellwig, David J. "The Afro-American Press and Woodrow Wilson's Mexican Policy, 1913-1917." Phylon 48.4 (1987): 261-270. online
- Hemmingway, Theodore. “Prelude to Change: Black Carolinians in the War Years, 1914-1920.” Journal of Negro History 65#3 (1980), pp. 212–227. online
- Jablonski, Joseph John, Jr. "The Dark Side of President Woodrow Wilson's Progressive Political Thought: Its Race-Historicism and Other Anti-Democratic Aspects" (PhD dissertation, The Claremont Graduate University; ProQuest Dissertations Publishing, 2018. 13424622).
- Jordan, William. “‘The Damnable Dilemma’: African-American Accommodation and Protest during World War I.” Journal of American History 82#4 (1995), pp. 1562–1583. online
- King, Desmond. "The Segregated State? Black Americans and the Federal Government." Democratization (Spring 1996) 3#1 pp 65–92. Shows that the Republicans in the 1920s did not reverse Wilsonian race policies.
- Lumley, James Houston. "Woodrow Wilson: Racism, Religion and the Rise of White Supremacy in the Early Twentieth Century" (PhD dissertation, Southern New Hampshire University ProQuest Dissertations & Theses, 2024. 31334576).
- Lunardini, Christine A. "Standing Firm: William Monroe Trotter's Meetings With Woodrow Wilson, 1913-1914." Journal of Negro History 64.3 (1979): 244-264. online
- Oks, David. "The election of 1916,“Negrowumpism,” and the Black defection from the republican party." Journal of the Gilded Age and Progressive Era 20.4 (2021): 523-547. https://doi.org/10.1017/S1537781421000360
- O'Reilly, Kenneth (1997). "The Jim Crow Policies of Woodrow Wilson". Journal of Blacks in Higher Education (17): 117–121. doi:10.2307/2963252. ISSN 1077-3711. JSTOR 2963252
- Osborn, George C. "Woodrow Wilson Appoints a Negro Judge." Journal of Southern History 24.4 (1958): 481-493. online
- Patler, Nicholas. Jim Crow and the Wilson administration: protesting federal segregation in the early twentieth century (2007).
- Scheiber, Jane Lang, and Harry N. Scheiber. "The Wilson administration and the wartime mobilization of black Americans, 1917–18." Labor History 10.3 (1969): 433-458.
- Schaffer, Samuel Lonsdale. "New South Nation: Woodrow Wilson's Generation and the Rise of the South, 1884–1920" (PhD dissertation, Yale University; ProQuest Dissertations Publishing, 2010. 3440588)
- Shimazu, Naoko. Japan, race and equality: the racial equality proposal of 1919 (1998). excerpt
- Smith. Shane A. "The Crisis in the Great War: W.E.B. Du Bois and His Perception of African-American Participation in World War I," Historian 70#2 (Summer 2008): 239–62.
- Walker, Samuel, Presidents and Civil Liberties from Wilson to Obama: A Story of Poor Custodians (Cambridge University Press, 2014)
- Wolgemuth, Kathleen L. "Woodrow Wilson and Federal Segregation". Journal of Negro History. 44 (2): 158–173. doi:10.2307/2716036. ISSN 0022-2992. JSTOR 2716036
- Wolgemuth, Kathleen Long. "Woodrow Wilson's Appointment Policy and the Negro." Journal of Southern History 24.4 (1958): 457-471. online
- Yellin, Eric S. "'It Was Still No South to Us'" Washington History (2009), Vol. 21, p23-48; the Black community in Washington 1861 to 1927.
- Yellin, Eric S. (2013). Racism in the Nation's Service. doi:10.5149/9781469607214_Yellin. ISBN 978-1-4696-0720-7. S2CID 153118305.

=== PhD dissertations ===
A partial list of dissertations finished since 1966; all are available at no cost to download from online copies using ProQuest website at academic libraries.

- Behn, Beth A. "Woodrow Wilson's conversion experience: The president and the federal woman suffrage amendment" (University of Massachusetts Amherst ProQuest Dissertations Publishing, 2012. 3498330).
- Benbow, Mark Elliott. "Leading them to the promised land: Woodrow Wilson, covenant theology and the Mexican Revolution, 1913--1915" (Ohio University; ProQuest Dissertations Publishing, 1999. 9956767).
- Brown John Eugene. " Woodrow Wilson's Vice President: Thomas R. Marshall and the Wilson Administration 1913–1921" (Ball State University; ProQuest Dissertations & Theses, 1970. 7107961.
- Duff, John Bernard. " The politics of revenge: The ethnic opposition to the peace policies of Woodrow Wilson" (Columbia University; ProQuest Dissertations & Theses, 1964. 6710341).
- Esposito, David M. "Force without stint or limit: Woodrow Wilson and the origins of the American expeditionary force" (Pennsylvania State University; ProQuest Dissertations & Theses, 1988. 8909985).
- Fernandez, Luke O. "Preparing students for citizenship: The pedagogical vision of Yale's Noah Porter, Harvard's Charles Eliot and Princeton's Woodrow Wilson" (Cornell University; ProQuest Dissertations Publishing, 1997. 9728389).
- Filozof, Michael Francis. "Woodrow Wilson and international human rights" (State University of New York at Buffalo; ProQuest Dissertations Publishing, 2000. 9958260).
- Garcia, Ecatarina M. "The Intersection of Leadership Style and Behavior, Risk Propensity and the Decision to Enter or Avoid Armed Conflict: A Comparative Case Study of George W. Bush, Leonid I. Brezhnev, T. Woodrow Wilson, and Mikhail Gorbachev" (Doctoral dissertation, American Public University System; ProQuest Dissertations & Theses, 2023. 29998899).
- Hamel, William Christopher. "Race and responsible government: Woodrow Wilson and the Philippines" (Michigan State University; ProQuest Dissertations Publishing, 2002. 3075014).
- Jablonski, Joseph John, Jr. "The Dark Side of President Woodrow Wilson's Progressive Political Thought: Its Race-Historicism and Other Anti-Democratic Aspects" (The Claremont Graduate University; ProQuest Dissertations Publishing, 2018. 13424622).
- Johnson, Theodore Richard. " the Memorialization of Woodrow Wilson" (George Washington University; ProQuest Dissertations & Theses, 1979. 7923409.
- Kendall, Eric M. "Diverging Wilsonianisms: Liberal internationalism, the peace movement, and the ambiguous legacy of Woodrow Wilson" (Case Western Reserve University; ProQuest Dissertations Publishing, 2012. 3497646).
- Kirwan, Kent A. " Politics. and Administration: An analysis of Woodrow Wilson's 'The Study of Administration' " University of Chicago; ProQuest Dissertations & Theses, 1970. T-22209).
- Kraig, Robert Alexander. "Woodrow Wilson and the lost world of the oratorical statesman" (University of Wisconsin - Madison; ProQuest Dissertations Publishing, 1999. 9927251).
- Kramer, Jacob. "The new freedom and the radicals: Woodrow Wilson, progressive views of radicalism, and the origins of repressive tolerance, 1900–1924" (City University of New York;' ProQuest Dissertations Publishing, 2006. 3232024).
- Long, Scott G. "Wilson and Carranza: A reappraisal of Woodrow Wilson's Mexican policy" ( University of Montana; ProQuest Dissertations & Theses, 1981. EP40646).
- Lumley, James Houston. "Woodrow Wilson: Racism, Religion and the Rise of White Supremacy in the Early Twentieth Century" (Southern New Hampshire University; ProQuest Dissertations & Theses, 2024. 31334576).
- Manijak, William. "Polish American pressure groups, Woodrow Wilson and the 13th point; The significance of Polish food relief; the Polish vote in the 1916 presidential election; and European events in the eventual self-determination for Poland" Ball State University;ProQuest Dissertations & Theses, 1975. 7616969.
- Matsuda, Takeshi. " Woodrow Wilson's Dollar Diplomacy in the Far East: The New Chinese Consortium. 1917–1921" (University of Wisconsin - Madison; ProQuest Dissertations & Theses, 1979. 7922822).
- Moyer, Jason Ray. "Not just civil religion: Theology in the cases of Woodrow Wilson, John Kennedy, and Barack Obama" (The University of Iowa; ProQuest Dissertations Publishing, 2011. 3461205).
- Nabulsi, Kassem. "Presidential leadership in foreign policy: Woodrow Wilson, Harry Truman and George Bush in an international system undergoing transformation" (University of Southern California; ProQuest Dissertations Publishing, 1999. 3110957).
- Owen-Cruise, Sian Elizabeth. "'Out into pastures of quietness and peace such as the world never dreamed of before': An examination of Woodrow Wilson 's peace rhetoric as covenant creation. (Volumes I and II)" (University of Minnesota; ProQuest Dissertations Publishing, 1993. 9405346).
- Pyne, John Michael." Woodrow Wilson's abdication of domestic and party leadership: Autumn. 1918 to Autumn. 1919." ((University of Notre Dame; ProQuest Dissertations & Theses, 1979. 7919956).
- Rinehart, John M. "The making of a Christian statesman: Woodrow Wilson's religious thought and practice, 1856–1910" (University of Illinois at Chicago; ProQuest Dissertations Publishing, 2006. 3248871).
- Rothra, John L. "Progressivism's impact on evangelism: The confluence of ideas between Woodrow Wilson and John R. Mott, and Barack Obama and Jim Wallis" (Southwestern Baptist Theological Seminary ProQuest Dissertations Publishing, 2014. 3580304).
- Schaffer, Samuel Lonsdale. "New South Nation: Woodrow Wilson's Generation and the Rise of the South, 1884–1920" (Yale University; ProQuest Dissertations Publishing, 2010. 3440588)
- Stid, Daniel Diehl. "Woodrow Wilson, responsible government, and the Founders' regime" (Harvard University; ProQuest Dissertations Publishing, 1994. 9421980).
- Theakston, Colin. "Woodrow Wilson and the American Labour Movement" (Open University (United Kingdom); ProQuest Dissertations & Theses, 1992. 27758382).
- Thorsen, Niels Aage. " The political and economic thought of Woodrow Wilson. 1875–1902" (Princeton University; ProQuest Dissertations & Theses, 1981. 8111286).
- Torodash, Martin. " Woodrow. Wilson and the Tariff Question: The Importance of the Underwood Act in his Reform Program." (New York University; ProQuest Dissertations & Theses, 1966. 6700641).
- Wolper, Gregg Ira. "The origins of public diplomacy: Woodrow Wilson, George Creel, and the Committee on Public Information" (University of Chicago; ProQuest Dissertations & Theses, 1991. T-31437).
- Yang, David William. "An agonized state of peace: The Lockean social contract theory of Woodrow Wilson" (The Johns Hopkins University; ProQuest Dissertations Publishing, 1996. 9617627).
- Zentner, Scot James. "Leadership and partisanship in the thought of Woodrow Wilson and the American founders" (Michigan State University; ProQuest Dissertations Publishing, 1994. 9512165).

=== Historiography ===
- Ambrosius, Lloyd. Wilsonianism: Woodrow Wilson and his legacy in American foreign relations (Springer, 2002).
- Bimes, Terry; Skowronek, Stephen. "Woodrow Wilson's Critique of Popular Leadership: Reassessing the Modern-Traditional Divide in Presidential History". Polity (1996). 29#1: 27–63. doi:10.2307/3235274.
- Cooper, John Milton, ed. Reconsidering Woodrow Wilson: Progressivism, Internationalism, War, and Peace (Johns Hopkins University Press, 2008)
- Cooper, John Milton. "Making A Case for Wilson," in Reconsidering Woodrow Wilson (2008) ch 1.
- Janis, Mark Weston. "How Wilsonian Was Woodrow Wilson?," Dartmouth Law Journal (2007) 5:1 pp. 1–15 online
- Kennedy, Ross A. "Woodrow Wilson, World War I, and an American Conception of National Security." Diplomatic History 25.1 (2001): 1-31.
- Johnston, Robert D. "Re-Democratizing the Progressive Era: The Politics of Progressive Era Political Historiography." Journal of the Gilded Age and Progressive Era 1.1 (2002): 68–92.
- Saunders, Robert M. “History, Health and Herons: The Historiography of Woodrow Wilson's Personality and Decision-Making.” Presidential Studies Quarterly 24#1 pp. 57–77. online
- Saunders, Robert M. In Search of Woodrow Wilson: Beliefs and Behavior (1998)
- Seltzer, Alan L. "Woodrow Wilson as" Corporate-Liberal": Toward a Reconsideration of Left Revisionist Historiography." Western Political Quarterly 30.2 (1977): 183-212.
- Smith, Daniel M. "National interest and American intervention, 1917: an historiographical appraisal." Journal of American History 52.1 (1965): 5-24. online
- Wertheim, Stephen. "The Wilsonian Chimera: Why Debating Wilson’s Vision Hasn’t Saved American Foreign Relations’." White House Studies 10.4 (2011): 343–359. online
- Princeton University (1956). "Woodrow Wilson – Catalogue of an Exhibition in the Princeton University Library February 18 through April 15, 1956 Commemorating the Centennial of His Birth". XVII (3, Spring issue). The Princeton University Library Chronicle.

== Primary sources ==
=== Books written by Wilson ===
Selected items only. Older items are not included.

- Congressional Government, A Study in American Politics. Boston: Houghton, Mifflin and Company. 1885 – via Internet Archive.
- George Washington. New York and London: Harper & Brothers Publishers. 1896 – via Internet Archive.
- On Being Human, 1897.
- The State: Elements of Historical and Practical Politics, 1898.
- A History of the American People. New York and London: Harper & Brothers Publishers. 1902 – via Internet Archive. volume I; volume II; volume III; volume IV; volume V.
- Constitutional Government in the United States, 1908.
- The New Freedom, 1913.
- When A Man Comes To Himself, 1915.
- The Road Away from Revolution, 1923.

=== Other primary sources ===
- August Heckscher, ed., The Politics of Woodrow Wilson: Selections from his Speeches and Writings (1956)
- Link, Arthur S. (ed.). The Papers of Woodrow Wilson. Archived from the original on November 1, 2014. 69 volumes. Annotated edition of all of Wilson's correspondence, speeches and writings.
- Tumulty, Joseph P. (1921). Woodrow Wilson as I Know Him.. Memoir by Wilson's chief of staff.
- Wilson, Edith Bolling (1939). My memoir. Bobbs-Merrill. ASIN B0008BKX5I. Arno Press reprint: 1981.
- Wilson, Woodrow (1917). Why We Are at War.
- Wilson, Woodrow (1925). Selected Literary & Political Papers & Addresses of Woodrow Wilson. New York, Grosset & Dunlap. 3 volumes, 1918 and later editions.
- Woodrow Wilson, compiled with his approval by Hamilton Foley; Woodrow Wilson's Case for the League of Nations, Princeton University Press, Princeton 1923; contemporary book review
- Wilson, Woodrow. Messages & Papers of Woodrow Wilson 2 vol (ISBN 1-135-19812-8)
- Wilson, Woodrow. The New Democracy. Presidential Messages, Addresses, and Other Papers (1913–1917) 2 vol 1926, ISBN 0-89875-775-4
- Wilson, Woodrow. President Woodrow Wilson's Fourteen Points (1918)
- Wilson, Woodrow. Presidential papers and personal library, Woodrow Wilson Library of the Library of Congress.
- The Study of Administration, 1887.
- Leaders of Men, 1890.
