= Cumberland station (Western Maryland Railway) =

Railway station in Cumberland, Maryland, US

Cumberland
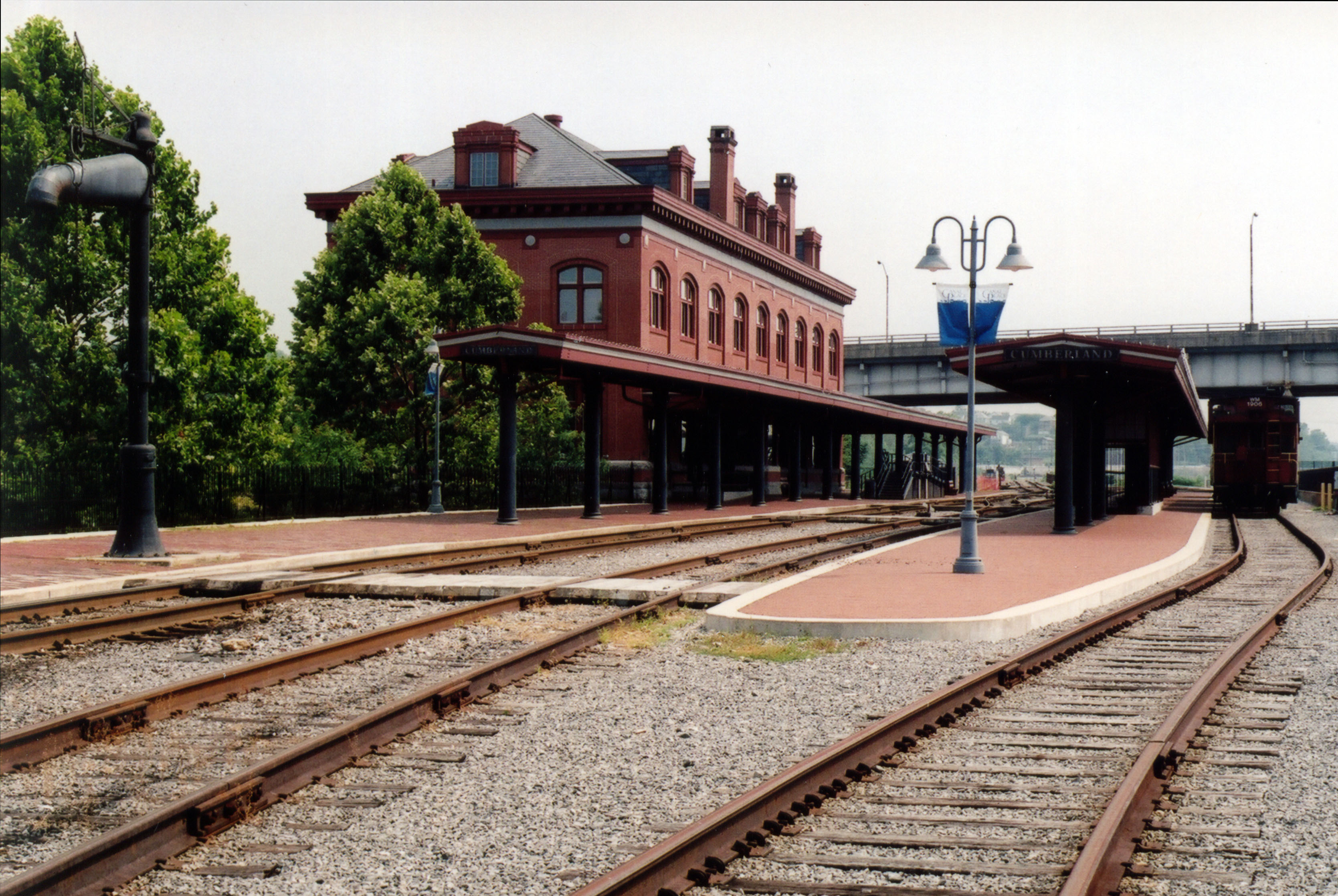
- Western Maryland Railway station in 2003

General information
- Location: 13 Canal Street; Cumberland, MD 21502
- Coordinates: 39°38′58″N 78°45′50″W
- Line: Western Maryland Scenic Railroad
- Platforms: 1 side platform
- Tracks: 3

Construction
- Parking: Yes
- Accessible: Yes

History
- Opened: 1913
- Rebuilt: 1988

Services
Preceding station	Western Maryland Scenic Railroad	Following station
Frostburg Terminus	Main Line	Terminus
Former services
Preceding station	Western Maryland Railway	Following station
Terminus	Main Line	Old Town toward Baltimore Hillen
Seymour toward Elkins	Cumberland – Elkins	Terminus
Lap toward Connellsville	Cumberland – Connellsville	Terminus
Terminus	State Line Branch	State Line Terminus
Preceding station	Pennsylvania Railroad	Following station
Terminus	Bedford Branch	State Line toward Altoona
- Western Maryland Railway Station
- U.S. National Register of Historic Places
- Location within Maryland Location within the United States
- Area: 1 acre (0.40 ha)
- NRHP reference No.: 73000885
- Added to NRHP: June 19, 1973
Location

Cumberland station is a historic railway station in Cumberland, Allegany County, Maryland. It was built in 1913 as a stop for the Western Maryland Railway (WM). The building was operated as a passenger station until the WM ended service in 1959, and it continued to be used by the railway until 1976. It was subsequently restored and currently serves as a museum and offices, as well as the operating base for a heritage railway.

== Description ==
The station was designed by Baltimore architect C. M. Anderson, and sited on a filled-in basin at the terminus of the Chesapeake and Ohio Canal. The building is a large commercial-style building that expresses the architectural functionalism of the turn of the 20th century. The brick structure is nine bays long and three bays wide, with two monumental stories on the west facade and three stories on the east. A one-story platform shelter runs along the west facade and extends out toward the tracks.

== History ==
The WM began daily through-train passenger service between Baltimore and Chicago, by way of Cumberland, on June 15, 1913. For several years the premier trains on the route, the Chicago Limited and Baltimore Limited, featured Pullman sleeping car service. Other WM trains ran between Cumberland and Elkins, West Virginia. The number and variety of passenger trains decreased through the years of the Great Depression and afterward. The WM ended its passenger train service between Cumberland and Baltimore in 1953, and the Cumberland-Elkins trains ended in 1959.

The WM used the upper floors of the station for its Western Division offices, and a control tower, even after the railroad's absorption into the Chessie System, until the dispatchers were reassigned in 1976. The building slowly fell into disrepair, and Chessie leased it, and later sold it to the Kelly Tire Company to store tires. The City of Cumberland subsequently bought the building for one dollar.

== Restoration ==
With the advent of the initiative in Cumberland to create a scenic railroad using the former WM trackage north out of the city, the station was partially restored in 1990. Full restoration did not begin, however, until the creation of the Canal Place Preservation and Development Authority in 1996. This restoration created a museum area for the National Park Service on the first floor; a waiting area, gift shop, and cafe on the second floor; and office spaces on the third and fourth floors. Exterior work included the construction of an elevator tower; third, display track; a second platform; handicapped passenger accessibility ramp; and the restoration of the platform shelters, WM employee memorial, and the pedestrian railroad underpass.

Today the building is part of a preservation district called Canal Place, a facility operated by the Canal Place Preservation and Development Authority. The station houses offices of the Authority, the Western Maryland Scenic Railroad, a visitors center for the C&O Canal National Historic Park, and leased offices to local officials and businesses.

It was listed on the National Register of Historic Places in 1973 as the Western Maryland Railway Station.

== See also ==
- Queen City Hotel (B&O Railroad station, Cumberland)
