= Virginia Jaramillo (artist) =

Artist in paint, paper and pulp

- Born: March 21, 1939 (age 87); El Paso, Texas
- Education: Otis Art Institute
- Known for: painting, sculpture, mixed media
- Spouse: Daniel LaRue Johnson (m. 1960; died 2017)

Virginia Jaramillo is an American artist of Mexican heritage. Born in 1939 in El Paso, Texas, she was raised and educated in Los Angeles before moving to New York City. She has exhibited in exhibitions internationally since 1959.

== Early life and education ==
Virginia Jaramillo was born on March 21, 1939, in El Paso, Texas. Her family moved to California when she was 2 years old, settling on East Washington Boulevard in East Los Angeles. Jaramillo spent her childhood in Los Angeles and often traveled during the summers to her grandparents' turkey ranch in California's Imperial Valley.

Jaramillo's interest in art was supported by her family and she enrolled at the public Manual Arts High School in 1954 at their encouragement; Manual Arts was well-known in the city for its association with artists like Philip Guston, Jackson Pollock, and David Alfaro Siqueiros. While in high school, she met and eventually began dating fellow art student Daniel LaRue Johnson. When she was 18, Jaramillo gave herself the goal of exhibiting her work at the Los Angeles County Museum of Art (LACMA).

In 1958, Jaramillo enrolled in the Otis Art Institute, along with Johnson. Many of the artworks she produced during this time were painted on student-grade canvases stretched over wood that her father had procured, a result of there being no art stores in her neighborhood to purchase higher quality materials. In 1959, her painting Satire, which she had completed in her childhood bedroom, was included in LACMA's annual exhibition of contemporary art. She signed the painting with the gender neutral name "V. Jaramillo" to avoid having her work prejudged or dismissed because she was a woman. Jaramillo and Johnson married in 1960.

== Life and career ==
=== Early and mid-career ===
In 1965, Jaramillo moved with her family to Paris after Johnson was awarded a Guggenheim Fellowship to study sculpture in France. They left Los Angeles amidst the Watts riots and related unrest in the city. The move to Paris was Jaramillo's first experience leaving the country. Although Jaramillo and Johnson only lived in Paris for a year, her time in the city had a significant impact on her: "It changed the way I looked at things and it kind of zipped open my brain." After returning from Paris in 1966, Jaramillo and Johnson retrieved their belongings from California and moved to New York.

Jaramillo's art has been primarily concerned with materials, and she states that "partly fuelled by her Mexican-American heritage," her "personal and artistic life has been a political statement." Her experiences led to her involvement in various feminist projects, such as the Third World Women issue of Heresies journal, and working on the board of the Feminist Art Institute.

Jaramillo was selected for participation in The De Luxe Show (1971) in Houston, Texas curated by Peter Bradley. The De Luxe Show was one of the first racially integrated exhibitions in the United States" and included artists such as Sam Gilliam, Kenneth Noland and Jules Olitski. During the 1970s she continued to exhibit. Group shows included participation in the Whitney Annual at the Whitney Museum of American Art in 1972. Solo exhibitions were held at the Douglas Drake Gallery in Kansas City, and the Soho Center for Visual Artists in 1976.

=== Later recognition ===
In 2011, Jaramillo's work was included in Now Dig This! Art & Black Los Angeles at the Hammer Museum in Los Angeles. In 2017 she was included in We Wanted a Revolution: Black Radical Women 1965-85 at the Brooklyn Museum in New York, and in the Tate Modern's Soul of a Nation: Art in the Age of Black Power.

The Brooklyn Museum purchased Jaramillo's 1971 painting Untitled in 2017 through the Frieze Brooklyn Museum Fund. Initially produced for The De Luxe Show, at the time of auction this painting - along with three others by Jaramillo - had not been seen in 40 years.

In 2020, Jaramillo staged her first-ever solo museum exhibition at the Menil Collection in Houston. The show featured a variety of her Curvilinear Paintings from 1969 to 1974, many on display together for the first time.

Jaramillo's work was included in the 2021 exhibition Women in Abstraction at the Centre Pompidou.

In 2023, the Kemper Museum of Contemporary Art in Kansas City, Missouri, staged Jaramillo's first full-career museum retrospective, Principle of Equivalence. Her work was included in the 2024 exhibition Making Their Mark: Works from the Shah Garg Collection at the Berkeley Art Museum and Pacific Film Archive (BAMPFA).

== Exhibitions ==
- 1971 The DeLuxe Show, The Deluxe Theater, Houston
- 1972 Whitney Annual, Whitney Museum of American Art, New York
- 1975 Douglas Drake Gallery, Kansas City (solo show)
- 1976 Soho Center for Visual Arts, New York (solo show)
- 2023 Principle of Equivalence, Kemper Museum of Contemporary Art, Kansas City (solo show)

== Notes, citations, and references ==
=== Cited references ===
- Calderón, Barbara (2023). "Freedom to Interrogate Earth". In Dziedzic, Erin (ed.). Virginia Jaramillo: Principles of Equivalence. Kansas City, Missouri / New Haven, Connecticut: Kemper Museum of Contemporary Art / Yale University Press. pp. 15–21. ISBN 9780300270303. OCLC 1374570856.
- Dziedzic, Erin, ed. (2023). Virginia Jaramillo: Principles of Equivalence. Kansas City, Missouri / New Haven, Connecticut: Kemper Museum of Contemporary Art / Yale University Press. ISBN 9780300270303. OCLC 1374570856.
- Jaramillo, Virginia (1 October 2020). "No. 465: Virginia Jaramillo". The Modern Art Notes Podcast (Interview). Interviewed by Green, Tyler.
