= The De Luxe Show =

1971 art exhibition in Houston, Texas

- Original exhibition poster
- Date: August 22 - September 29, 1971
- Venue: The DeLuxe Theater
- Location: Fifth Ward, Houston, Texas
- Theme: Contemporary art, abstract art
- Patron: Menil Foundation
- Organised by: Peter Bradley, John de Menil

The De Luxe Show was an art exhibition held from August to September 1971 at the DeLuxe Theater in Houston's Fifth Ward. Organized by African American artist Peter Bradley and arts patron John de Menil with the mission of bringing contemporary art into a low-income, predominantly Black community, The De Luxe Show was one of the first racially integrated art exhibitions in the United States and featured some of the most acclaimed artists of the era as well as several emerging artists who would go on to become widely recognized.

== History ==
In late spring 1971, businessman and philanthropist John de Menil approached New York-based artist and curator Peter Bradley to organize an exhibition in Houston of art by Black artists after a series of high-profile controversies surrounding shows of Black art in both Houston and New York. Earlier in the year, the Menil Foundation, de Menil's arts foundation that would eventually form the Menil Collection, had sponsored a show at Rice University's Institute for the Arts organized by Jewish artist Larry Rivers that was poorly received by critics, activists, and community members. The show, Some American History, ran from February through April 1971 and featured works by Rivers and six Black artists that largely focused on slavery and violence against African Americans. The Black artists whose work was featured - Ellsworth Ausby, Frank Bowling, Daniel LaRue Johnson, William T. Williams, and Joe Overstreet, along with Bradley - were unhappy with their role in the exhibition, and the show was criticized for being overly focused on Rivers' work and perspective as a white man making art about the African-American experience.

Prior to the Houston controversy, Black artists in New York held several protests focused on representation in museum exhibitions. The Black Emergency Cultural Coalition (BECC) organized the Harlem on My Mind protest in 1969 over a Metropolitan Museum of Art exhibition focused on Harlem that featured no art by Black artists. BECC then called for a boycott in early 1971 of the Whitney Museum of American Art's exhibition Contemporary Black Artists in America after disputes over the museum's decision not to include a Black curator or significantly market the show. 24 of the 78 artists in the exhibition pulled out before it opened or had their work removed during its run. Bradley himself refused to participate in the Whitney exhibition.

De Menil told Bradley following Some American History that he wanted to host an exhibition that allowed Black artists to represent themselves on their own terms. Bradley responded by emphasizing the importance of integrating art exhibitions and did not agree to organize an exhibition until the decision was made to include both white and Black artists.

While de Menil stated that he wanted to support Black artists, he is also documented as having disregarded Black artists who actually lived and worked in Houston. Literary agent Ronald Hobbs wrote to de Menil following Some American History encouraging him to organize a show with local Black artists, arguing it would create a point of pride for community members. De Menil responded by saying, "A show by local black artists would have been a pacifier because they are from mediocre to bad."

Bradley sent out invitations to artists in July. His typewritten message to invitees began with a brief introduction about the aim of the show, "We’re planning an exhibition in the poor section of Houston. The object is to bring first-rate art to people who don’t usually attend shows. Hence our intention to rent a large space, a church, a ballroom, an empty warehouse. It will be of easy access to housewives, children, laborers; the people." De Menil also invited Texas Southern University professors Jefferee James and Mickey Leland to assist with the show. James helped publicize the show in the community and Leland, who would go on to represent Houston in the United States House of Representatives, helped organize the event and selected the DeLuxe Theater in the Fifth Ward as the site for the show.

The DeLuxe had served as a movie theater for the Black community in the Fifth Ward since 1941 but was closed in 1969 after falling into disrepair following the integration of movie theaters in the area. Bradley enlisted employees from the Institute for the Arts along with a construction company to repair and renovate the theater for the exhibition, leaving several historical features unchanged and much of the disrepair on the outside still visible. Artists Sam Gilliam and Kenneth Noland, along with art critic Clement Greenberg, assisted Bradley with the organizing and installation of the show.

Bradley selected 40 works of abstract art to include in the show, focusing on what he called "good, hard abstraction." He said he chose the works and designed the layout of the show with children in mind, believing that "The young kids are really the ones that get something out of it."

== Participating artists ==
Peter Bradley originally invited 18 artists to participate and 16 accepted; Barbara Chase-Riboud and David Diao both declined. The 18 artists included in the final show were Darby Bannard, Anthony Caro, Dan Christensen, Ed Clark, painter Frank Davis, Sam Gilliam, painter Robert Gordon, Richard Hunt, Virginia Jaramillo, Daniel LaRue Johnson, Al Loving, Kenneth Noland, Jules Olitski, Larry Poons, sculptor Michael Steiner, William T. Williams, and painter/sculptor James Wolfe, along with Bradley himself. Jaramillo was the only woman included in the final show.

== Reception ==
Contemporaneous coverage of the exhibition claimed reception was generally positive but slightly mixed. The Houston Post reviewed the show and said it "demonstrated that there is a vast untapped reservoir of curiosity and human potential new experiences that is rarely piqued or reached by the conventional museum format." Clement Greenberg, who helped organize the show, praised the art and claimed "People were really looking. They were taking the art seriously." Conversely, local resident Vivian Ayers was interviewed by the Houston Chronicle and claimed the abstract art shown was not relevant to or legible by the community: "Nobody I knew who went to the show was even able to describe what was there. To me it showed a curious absence of a sense of cultural relevance ... The people know now why they wouldn’t necessarily have a feel for all the white man’s art they’ve been seeing." Various sources have said upwards of 4,000 or 5,000 people attended the exhibition during its run.

== Legacy ==
The De Luxe Show has been extensively cited by historians and critics as a landmark moment in contemporary art because of the decision to show an integrated group of artists.

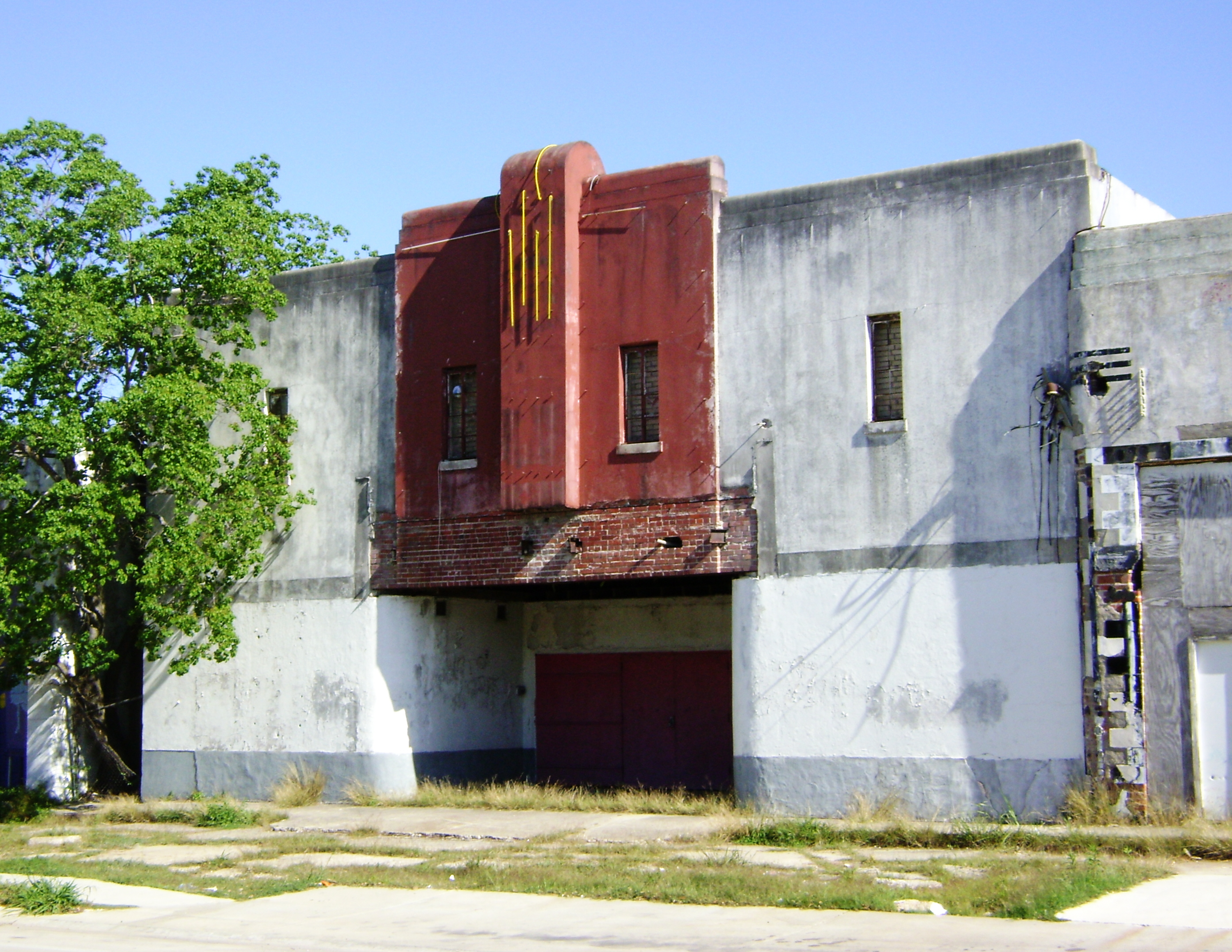
The DeLuxe Theater in 2009 prior to renovation

The DeLuxe Theater itself was used for two years following the exhibition to display African art from the de Menil's collection, but it fell back into disrepair after several years. In 1998, the Fifth Ward Redevelopment Corporation bought the property and several adjacent buildings. Renovation began in 2014 and the Redevelopment Corporation partnered with the city of Houston and Texas Southern University to add a professional theater and several arts facilities, and the redesigned theater opened to the public again in 2015.

The theater, along with several art galleries in New York and Los Angeles, hosted 50th anniversary retrospective exhibitions about The De Luxe Show in 2021. In Houston, the retrospective was titled Art for the People: Celebrating 50 Years of the DeLuxe Show and the 5th Ward Community and consisted of art from the show and works by local artists along with ephemera from local archives. While the show highlighted the historic nature of the original exhibition, curators and organizers also questioned the validity of Bradley and de Menil's assertion that the Fifth Ward did not already have cutting-edge contemporary artists. In interviews and archival materials included in the retrospective in Houston, local artists and community members critiqued the original exhibition's supposition that there weren't talented artists already living and working in the Fifth Ward, and went on to argue that the conceit of the show - outside artists "experimenting" with bringing art to a poor community - was regressive and ignored local talent working under impoverished conditions. Fifth Ward resident Jesse Lott participated in the retrospective and told Texas Monthly that the organizers of the original exhibition "did not recognize the creativity that existed within Fifth Ward," and said they saw themselves as bringing "the real deal down to the ghetto so [they] can show people what it’s about." Karma Gallery in New York and Parker Gallery in Los Angeles also hosted anniversary exhibitions, focusing mainly on work made by artists included in the original exhibition along with examinations of Peter Bradley's exhibition design.
