= Somerset Trust Company =

American community bank

- Industry: Banking and finance
- Founded: 1889
- Founder: Edward Scull
- Headquarters: Somerset, Pennsylvania, United States
- Key people: Sean M. Cook (CEO)
- Services: Financial services, Retail banking, Trust services, Investment management
- Net income: $24.5 million (2024)
- Total assets: $2.49 billion (Sept 2025)
- Parent: Somerset Trust Holding Company (OTCQX: SOME)
- Website: www.somersettrust.com

Somerset Trust Company is an American community bank and financial services company headquartered in Somerset, Pennsylvania. As of September 30, 2025, the bank reported total assets of approximately $2.49 billion and total deposits of $2.1 billion. It operates a network of over 40 branches and 80 ATMs throughout Somerset, Bedford, Fayette, Westmoreland, and Cambria counties, as well as parts of Maryland.

== History ==
On July 30, 1889, Congressman Edward Scull and his son, George R. Scull, organized the First National Bank of Somerset with a capital of $50,000. Edward Scull was the bank's first president. Following his death, George R. Scull assumed leadership and led a group to incorporate the Somerset Trust Company as a state-chartered bank on December 20, 1900, under a charter issued by Governor William A. Stone.

The two institutions operated as separate entities until March 1953, when they merged under the Somerset Trust Company name following approval by state regulators. At the time of the merger, the bank's resources were approximately $8 million. George Scull Cook, the great-grandson of the founder, became CEO in 1954. During his 34-year tenure, the bank's assets grew from $8 million to $145 million.

In the 1970s, the company moved its headquarters to the site of Frederick Goeb’s print shop, where the first Bible printed west of the Allegheny Mountains was produced in 1813.

In 2014, the company purchased and restored the former P&LE Train Station in Connellsville. The building reopened on October 25, 2014, as a bank branch and office space. As of 2026, the bank remains independent and is led by the sixth generation of the Scull family, with Sean M. Cook as CEO.
