= Garrett Bradley (filmmaker) =

American director and filmmaker (born 1986)

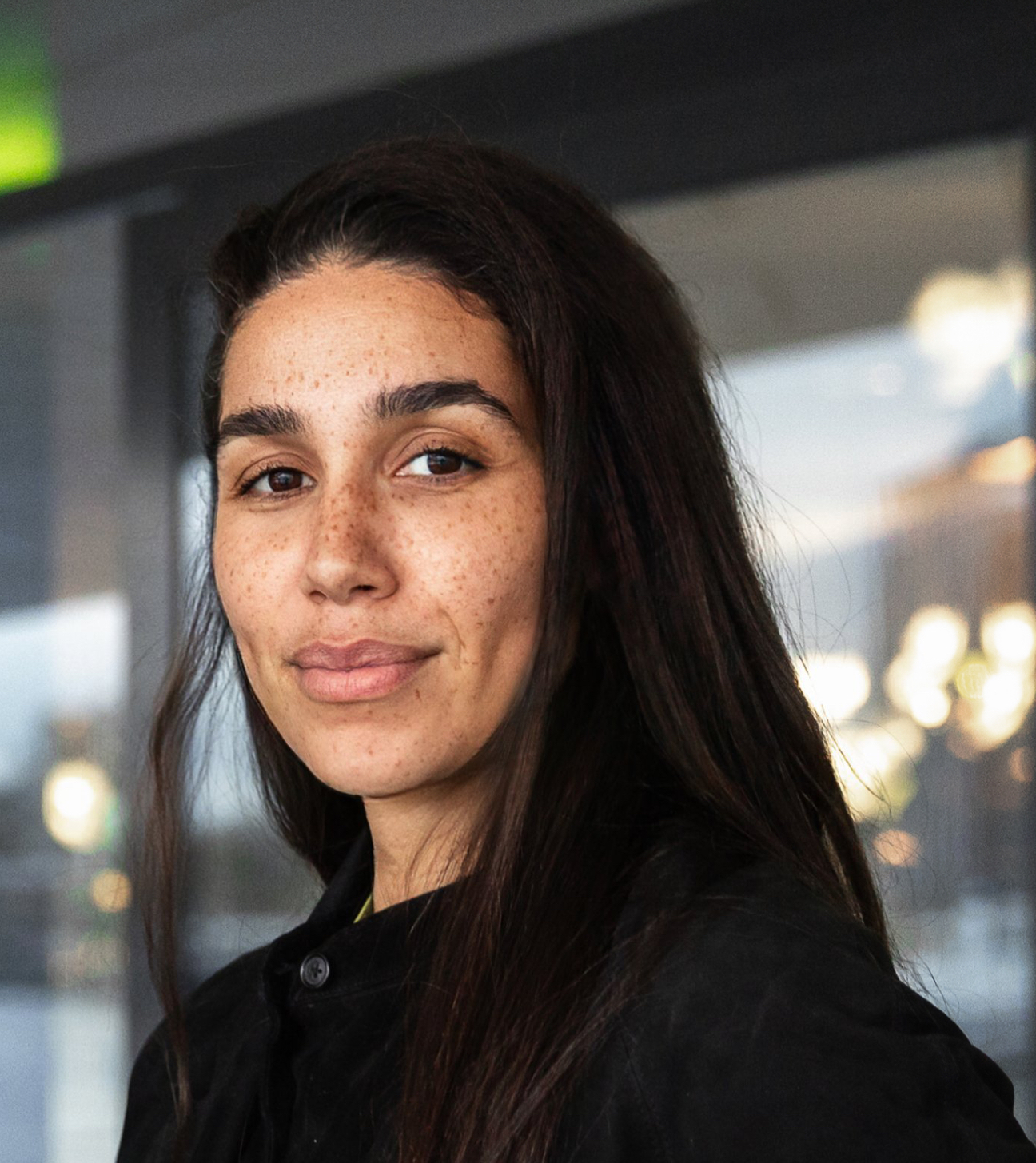
- Born: 1986 (age 39–40); New York City, U.S.
- Education: Smith College (BA); UCLA (MFA)
- Occupation: Filmmaker
- Years active: 2014–present
- Notable work: Alone; America; Time
- Parent(s): Peter Bradley; Suzanne McClelland
- Awards: MacArthur Fellowship (2025); Guggenheim Fellowship (2024); United States Artists Fellowship (2024); American Academy of Arts and Letters: Award in Art (2022); Sundance Film Festival; Best Director, US Documentary Competition (2020); Rome Prize (2020); Creative Capital Grantee (2019)

Garrett Bradley (born 1986) is an American filmmaker and director of short films, feature films, documentaries, and television. She is known for blending cinematic genres to explore the larger sociopolitical significance of the everyday moments of her subjects' lived experience.

== Early life and education ==
Bradley was born in New York City in 1986 to abstract painters Suzanne McClelland and Peter Bradley. Her parents divorced when she was two years old. At sixteen, Bradley made her first film, which involved her interviewing each of her parents about art, the other parent, and why they got a divorce. For Bradley, this first film project was an opportunity to ask her parents questions that she "didn't feel safe asking without a camera." She titled the film Be-Bop Fidelity and submitted it to the Bridge Film Festival run by her high school, the Brooklyn Friends School; there she won her first film award.

Bradley studied religion at Smith College, graduating in 2007, then earned her MFA in Directing at UCLA in 2012. She was a resident of the Skowhegan School of Painting and Sculpture in 2015.

== Career ==
Her debut feature-length film, Below Dreams, premiered at the 2014 Tribeca Festival and followed the lives of three people in reverse migration from north to south, in pursuit of a fresh start. Bradley was noted for her lyrical, hybridized filmmaking style described by New York Magazine's Bilge Ebiri as “a slow-burn beauty...improvisatory, glancing, gorgeous and as much about the textured quality and imagery as it is about character development or class conflict.” Below Dreams was cast almost entirely from Craigslist; an approach Bradley took after having no luck working with traditional casting directors in New Orleans.

In 2017, Bradley co-founded Creative Council, an artist-led after-school program which was aimed at developing strong college portfolios and applications for students attending public high schools in New Orleans. Creative Council was supported by The New Orleans Video Access Center (NOVAC).

In April 2024, Bradley received the 2024 Guggenheim Fellowship in Film-Video. In October 2025, Bradley was awarded a MacArthur Foundation Fellowship, popularly known as the MacArthur Foundation's "Genius Award."

=== Notable works ===
==== Alone ====
Bradley’s 13-minute documentary film Alone (2017), like her feature documentary film, Time, focuses on incarceration in the United States from what Bradley has described as a "distinctly Black southern, feminist perspective." The short features Aloné Watts, a young woman whose boyfriend (a subject of Bradley's 2014 Below Dreams) is incarcerated. The film depicts Watts' everyday life as she considers her future with her boyfriend; Fox Rich, protagonist of Time, appears in the short. Alone premiered at the 2017 Sundance Film Festival where it was awarded the Short Form Jury Award in nonfiction and was released by the New York Times OpDocs. In 2021, Alone was included in Grief and Grievance: Art and Mourning in America, an exhibition originally conceived by Okwui Enwezor for the New Museum.

==== America ====
Bradley's 2019 project, America, is both a single channel film and multi-channel installation - composed of two distinct edits. America was first installed at the New Orleans Museum of Art and went on to be included in Bradley's first touring solo exhibition, Garrett Bradley: American Rhapsody, at the Contemporary Arts Museum Houston, curated by Rebecca Matalon. American Rhapsody also traveled to The Momentary, August Wilson African American Cultural Center, and the Museum of Contemporary Art, Los Angeles. Projects: Garrett Bradley opened November 21, 2020 at the Museum of Modern Art, and was organized by Thelma Golden and Legacy Russell. The exhibition was part of a multiyear partnership between The Studio Museum in Harlem, The Museum of Modern Art and MoMA PS1. Roberta Smith of The New York Times wrote of the show “Bradley’s ambitious effort adds new energy to both Post-Minimalism and Pictures Generation appropriation art….Punctuated by the high-spirits and faster speed of “Field Day,” Bradley’s “America sets us in motion, circling the screens, exploring the possible identities, stories and symbols of its shifting stories and their regular moments of aural and filmic lyricism. Not to mention some perceptual overload: Does the piece use two, three or four channels? You think the images proceed in matched pairs — especially since only two projectors are visible — but then suddenly, they don’t. In every way, this work is a constant discovery.”

The short film of the same title was called by Observer film critic Simran Hans the "most original film" she saw at the 2019 Sundance Film Festival, was nominated for an Independent Documentary Award by the International Documentary Association and released in 2020 by Field of Vision and The Criterion Channel. America set a new precedent as a short film in 2019 when it was given a week run at the Brooklyn Academy of Music, under the title Garrett Bradley's America: A Journey Through Time. It was programmed alongside influenced and inspired works as well as a retrospective of Bradley's past films. Invited speakers included Saidiya Hartman, Julie Dash, and RaMell Ross. The event was in partnership with New York University's "Black Portraiture: V Memory and the Archive Past. Present. Future.” In The New York Review of Books, the author Maya Binyam wrote "Since the release of America, Bradley has joined the ranks of archivist-artist, figures whose mission is often said by critics and curators to be a corrective to the archive’s irredeemable deficiencies. The narratives that make up history have obvious limitations: they leave people out. Art, on the other hand, is believed by practically everyone, except for those who actually make it, to be boundless. And so creative people are tasked with doing what the entrenched institutions that narrate and preserve history supposedly cannot: facilitate redress. Bradley’s work undercuts that expectation".

==== Time ====
In 2020, Bradley presented her debut feature-length documentary, Time, which was nominated for over 57 awards and twenty wins including an Academy Award nomination, 2020 Peabody Award, and Best Director Award in the U.S. Documentary Competition category at the 2020 Sundance Film Festival. Her debut feature was also included in Time Magazine’s “25 Defining Works of the Black Renaissance,” Barack Obama’s 2020 favorite film list, and The Hollywood Reporter’s “Hollywood Reporter Critics Pick the 50 Best Films of the 21st Century (So Far)” list.

==== Other Works ====
In 2021, Netflix released Naomi Osaka, a three-part miniseries directed by Bradley. The series follows professional tennis player Naomi Osaka over a two-year period during the 2020 COVID-19 pandemic. Filming took place throughout the U.S., Japan, Haiti, and Australia. During filming Bradley gave Osaka a camcorder to film her own footage also used throughout the series. It is a look inside the life of a professional athlete trying to navigate the pressures of being a global superstar.

In 2022, Bradley had her inaugural exhibition with Lisson Gallery. Safe, is the second in a trilogy which includes AKA. These short films explore the nuanced overlap between women’s interior and exterior lives. Also, in 2022, Bradley and artist Arthur Jafa, collaborated on a split screen film installation a Negro, a Lim-o, which was commissioned for MoMA's exhibition Just Above Midtown: Changing Spaces. The piece is derived from both artist's personal relationship to "JAM" and uses "JAM" archival material, conversations, and original footage.

== Solo exhibitions ==
2023

- AKA, COMA, Sydney, Australia

2022

- Garrett Bradley: Safe, Lisson Gallery, London, UK
- Garrett Bradley: American Rhapsody, The Museum of Contemporary Art, Los Angeles, CA
- Garrett Bradley: American Rhapsody, August Wilson African American Cultural Center, Pittsburgh, PA
- Projects 111: Garrett Bradley, Museum of Modern Art, New York, NY

2021

- Garrett Bradley: American Rhapsody, The Momentary, Bentonville, AR

2019

- Garrett Bradley: American Rhapsody, Contemporary Arts Museum Houston, Houston, TX
- Garrett Bradley's America: A Journey Through Race and Time, BAM Rose Cinemas, New York, NY

== Group exhibitions ==
2022

- Just Above Midtown: 1974 to the Present, The Museum of Modern Art, New York, NY
- 2022 Invitational Exhibition of Visual Arts, American Academy of Arts and Letters, New York, NY
- Toni Morrison's Back Book, David Zwirner, New York, NY

2021

- Grief and Grievance: Art and Mourning in America, New Museum, New York, NY
- Family: Visions of a Shared Humanity, Art Gallery of New South Wales, Sydney, Australia

2020

- Cinque Monstre 2020: Convergence, American Academy of Rome, Rome, Italy

2019

- Shirin Neshat + Garrett Bradley, The Broad @ Array, Los Angeles, CA
- Bodies of Knowledge, New Orleans Museum of Art. New Orleans, LA
- Whitney Biennial, Whitney Museum of American Art, New York, NY

== Filmography ==
Film and television

Year	Title	Notes
2014	Below Dreams	Bradley's feature film debut at the 2014 Tribeca Film Festival
2015	Cover Me	Prospect 3 Arts Biennial
2016	Like	Short
2017	Alone	Short Form Jury Award in nonfiction at the 2017 Sundance Film Festival; 2017 Oscar Contender (Shortlist)
2017	Queen Sugar	Director of one episode, "Live in the All Along"
2018	The Earth is Humming	Documentary short
2019	America	Documentary short
2019	When They See Us	Second unit director, 4 episodes
2019	A.K.A.	Video Installation at the 2019 Whitney Biennial
2020	Time	Best Director for US Documentary in Competition at the 2020 Sundance Film Festival; Nominated for Academy Award for Best Documentary Feature
2021	Naomi Osaka	Purchased by Netflix
