= Naomi Osaka (TV series) =

American documentary

- Genre: Documentary
- Directed by: Garrett Bradley
- Music by: Devonté Hynes; Theodosia Roussos
- Country of origin: United States
- Original language: English
- No. of episodes: 3

Production
- Executive producers: LeBron James; Maverick Carter; Devin Johnson; Jamal Henderson; Philip Bryon; Matthew Goldberg; Brandon Carroll; Ryan Schiavo; Garrett Bradley
- Producers: Lauren Cioffi; Katy Murakami; Sally Rosen
- Cinematography: Jon Nelson
- Editors: Keith Fraase; Abhay Sofsky; Daniel Garber
- Running time: 37-42 minutes
- Production companies: Film 45; Uninterrupted

Original release
- Network: Netflix
- Release: July 16, 2021

Naomi Osaka is an American documentary television miniseries directed by Garrett Bradley. It follows the life of professional tennis player Naomi Osaka over the course of two years. It consists of three episodes, and premiered on July 16, 2021, on Netflix.

== Plot ==
The series follows Naomi Osaka over the course of two years.

== Episodes ==
No.	Title	Directed by	Written by	Original release date
1	"Rise"	Garrett Bradley	Leonard François	July 16, 2021
Raised to be a winner, Naomi chases a childhood dream of becoming a champion at the 2019 US Open. But as her star rises, success and fame take a toll.
2	"Champion Mentality"	Garrett Bradley	Leonard François	July 16, 2021
As she explores other talents, Naomi struggles with her mental well-being and sense of purpose while dealing with the unexpected loss of a close mentor.
3	"New Blueprint"	Garrett Bradley	Leonard François	July 16, 2021
After George Floyd's murder, Naomi joins a protest for the first time in Minnesota. Later, she uses her platform on the court and finds her voice.

== Production ==
Netflix approached Garrett Bradley about making a docuseries revolving around Naomi Osaka. Bradley wanted the series to feel as if the viewer was journeying alongside Osaka, and with the intent of it not being a recap of her Wikipedia page or what had been said about her in the press. Bradley also felt the series should not be a definitive portrait of Osaka but a snapshot of a period of time in her life. Principal photography on the series ran from 2019 to early 2021. The docuseries was announced in February 2020, with Netflix distributing, and Film45 and Uninterrupted producing.

== Release ==
The series had its world premiere at AFI Docs on June 22, 2021. It was released on Netflix on July 16, 2021.

== Reception ==
On the review aggregator website Rotten Tomatoes, the series holds an approval rating of 92% based on 26 critics and an average rating of 7.30/10. The website's consensus reads: "Under director Garrett Bradley's thoughtful eye, Naomi Osaka is a nuanced, moving portrait of a young athlete learning how to navigate life on and off the court." Metacritic, which uses a weighted average, assigned the film a score of 76 out of 100, based on 13 critics, indicating "generally favorable reviews".
