= United States Post Office (Connellsville, Pennsylvania) =

- United States Post Office-Connellsville
- U.S. National Register of Historic Places
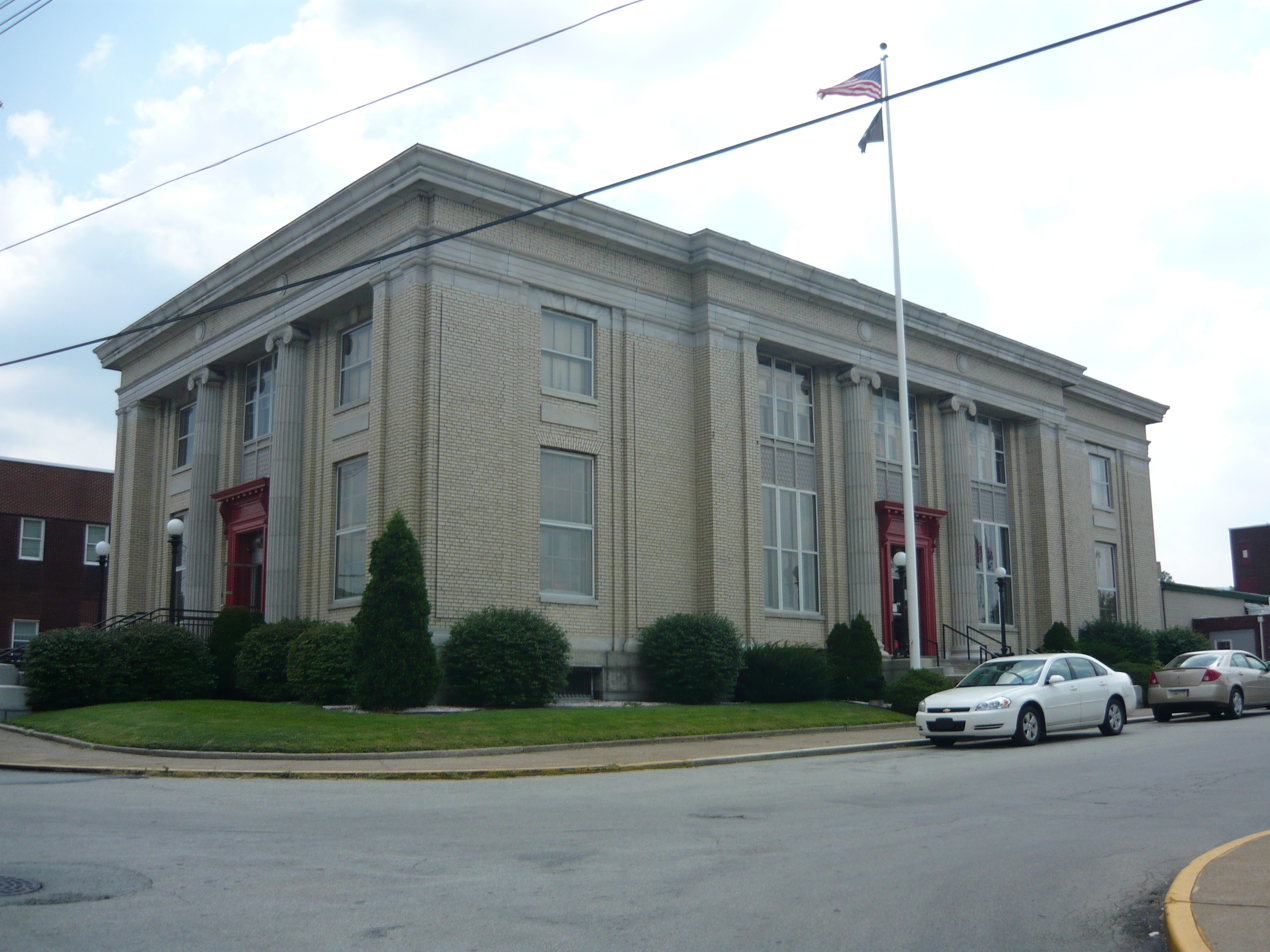
- US Post Office-Connellsville, April 2008

- Location within Pennsylvania Location within the United States
- Interactive map showing the location for U.S. Post Office-Connellsville
- Location: 115 N. Arch St., Connellsville, Pennsylvania
- Coordinates: 40°0′58″N 79°35′23″W
- Area: less than one acre
- Built: 1913
- Built by: Fissell, W.R., Co.
- Architect: Taylor, James Knox
- Architectural style: Classical Revival
- NRHP reference No.: 92001495
- Added to NRHP: June 24, 1993

The United States Post Office-Connellsville is an historic post office building in Connellsville, Fayette County, Pennsylvania, United States.

It was added to the National Register of Historic Places in 1993.

== History and architectural features ==
Built between 1911 and 1913, this historic structure is a two-story, five-bay, brick building that was designed in the Classical Revival style. It measures ninety-nine feet by fifty-four feet, with a ten-foot rear extension. It was designed by the Office of the Supervising Architect under the direction of James Knox Taylor.
