= Edgar Snyder =

American lawyer (born 1941)

- Born: September 6, 1941 (age 84); Connellsville, Pennsylvania, U.S.
- Education: Pennsylvania State University; University of Pittsburgh School of Law
- Occupation: Lawyer
- Website: edgarsnyder.com

Edgar Snyder (born September 6, 1941) is a Pittsburgh-area personal injury lawyer. One of the first attorneys in the area to advertise extensively on television, he became recognizable from his marketing campaign, which began in the mid 1980s. In 2009, the Pittsburgh Post-Gazette called him "Pittsburgh's best-known personal injury attorney".

== Early life and education ==
Snyder was born in Connellsville, Pennsylvania to Jewish Polish and Russian immigrants. He graduated from Taylor Allderdice High School in 1959. He attended Penn State University, where he was the captain of the school's debate team, and is a 1966 graduate of the University of Pittsburgh School of Law.

== Career ==
After graduation from law school, Snyder served as a public defender in Pittsburgh for Allegheny County, Pennsylvania. He then opened his first law office in nearby Duquesne, where he initially worked in criminal defense and represented high-profile clients in highly publicized cases. In the 1980s, he expanded his practice to include personal injury cases, driving a van around Western Pennsylvania to meet with clients.

Snyder's wife, Sandy, worked as his firm's former marketing director and helped expand his firm's reach through advertising. Snyder credits her with being the driving force behind his image. The advertisements helped propel Snyder's profile to the "near-saturation point," with an estimated 98% name recognition. According to Snyder, Sandy's "mantra" has been "we're going to make you a brand." One of the signatures in his television commercials is pointing his finger at the camera and saying, "There's never a fee unless we get money for you." This slogan emphasized the firm's use of contingency fees, where the firm only collects fees in the event of a legal victory.

Snyder was selected for inclusion in the list of Pennsylvania's "Super Lawyers" from 2004 through 2010.

By 2006 Snyder had stopped personally taking on cases, letting his partners argue the courtroom cases instead. Although he continued to oversee and direct the operations of his practice outside of the courtroom, it was reported in 2009 that he was beginning the process of retirement, but that he would continue to run the company for a few years.

Outside of his practice, Snyder hosted a weekly live call-in show The Law and You on regional cable news television channel PCNC. He reported spending "30 to 40 percent" of his time volunteering and traveling for various organizations, especially those focused on the Jewish communities in Pittsburgh, Israel, and the former Soviet Union.

In 2014, he transitioned from partner of Edgar Snyder & Associates to founder, of counsel, and retired shareholder.
