= Connellsville train wreck =

1903 rail accident in Pennsylvania, US

Coordinates: 40.052322°N 79.695511°W

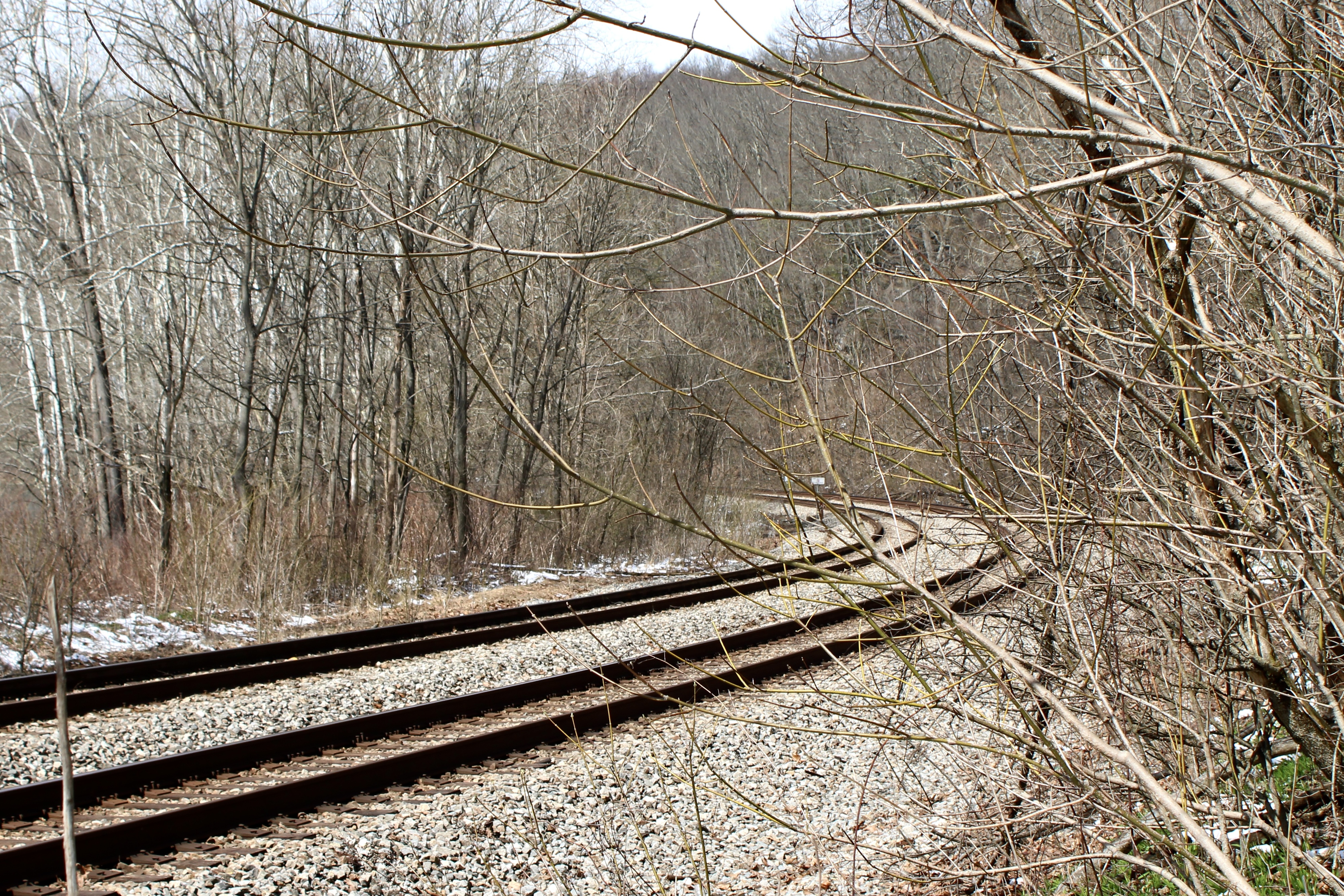
- Site of the wreck in 2026

Details
- Date: December 23, 1903; 122 years ago 7.45pm
- Location: Lower Tyrone Township, Fayette County, near Connellsville, Pennsylvania
- Country: United States
- Operator: Baltimore and Ohio Railroad
- Incident type: Derailment
- Cause: Debris on track

Statistics
- Trains: 1
- Passengers: 150
- Deaths: 64
- Injured: 68

The Connellsville train wreck was a rail accident that occurred on December 23, 1903, on the Baltimore and Ohio Railroad near Connellsville, Pennsylvania. (Note: The New York Times stated it happened at Laurel Run, eight miles west of Connellsville as did The Philadelphia Inquirer, whereas the Connellsville Courier whilst still citing Laurel Run as the location, places it two miles west of Dawson. To add to the confusion, Laurel Run, Pennsylvania is in a different county entirely.) The Duquesne Limited, a passenger train, derailed when it struck a load of timber lying on the tracks. The timber had fallen from a freight train minutes before the collision. The crash resulted in 64 deaths and 68 injuries.

== Trains ==
The eastbound Limited was travelling from Pittsburgh to New York at a speed of 60 miles per hour (97 km/h) with 150 passengers on board, many travelling to catch a passenger liner to Great Britain. The train was composed of Atlantic locomotive No. 1465, a combination baggage/smoker, two passenger coaches, two Pullmans, and a dining car. Less than 15 minutes earlier a load of timber had dropped from a westbound freight train of the Nickel Plate Road heading for New Castle. The timber had been loaded three days earlier in Friendship, Maryland, and it is thought the stakes on the side of the freight wagon gave way as it rounded a curve, sending the timber spilling onto the eastbound track, without knowledge of the train crew.

== Crash ==
The engineer of the Duquesne Limited barely had time to apply the brakes when at about 7.45 pm the Atlantic struck the 60-foot (18 m) timbers and fell onto its side between the tracks, which were torn apart a distance of 500 feet (150 m); the tender was 'thrown high into the air over the top of the engine'. The crowded smoking car ripped along the side of the engine, the broken steam dome catching it at window height. Escaping steam shot through the interior of the car, scalding everyone in it to death; according to the local paper they were 'literally cooked alive', 'Steam blistered the tongues and lips of the victims to an awful size and they protruded in a sickening manner', 'Death came quickly, but its agony evidently was intense'. Another car was thrown over an embankment into the nearby Youghiogheny River. On the other side of the river an operator in a tower (signal box) on the Pittsburgh and Lake Erie Railroad witnessed the disaster. Baggagemaster Thomas Baum managed to avert a worse disaster; despite being seriously injured he set fire to his coat using matches to flag down the next westbound passenger train, which managed to stop just short of the wreck. A relief train was organised which arrived on the scene at 9 pm amid reports that many of the bodies had been robbed.

== Afterwards ==
Connellsville's local newspaper described the scene in the town the next day, Christmas Eve: "Today the town is in a state of intense excitement. The morgues are crowded with visitors, viewing the unidentified dead. Rumors of identifications are rampant on the streets, each new name added to the list bringing with it a new aftermath of heart-rending sorrow. Early this morning people from all over the country flocked into town, uncertain regarding the safety of their friends known to be in Pittsburg yesterday. In spite of a drizzling rain great crowds are about the morgues, some morbidly inclined, others searching for news of missing friends."

At the coroner's court, officials of the Baltimore and Ohio Railroad stated that the blame for the accident should be with those who loaded the timbers onto the Nickel Plate Railroad wagon.
