= Suzanne McClelland =

American artist

- Born: 1959 (age 66–67); Jacksonville, Florida, U.S.
- Education: BFA, University of Michigan; MFA, School of Visual Arts
- Known for: Painting, Drawing, Printmaking, Collaborative Artist's Books
- Spouse(s): Peter Bradley (m. 1982; div. 1989), Andrew Vogelman (m. 1994)
- Children: Garrett Bradley, Lucas Vogelman (musician)
- Awards: Affiliated Fellowship at The American Academy in Rome 2026 Awarded by NAAF, Skowhegan Resident Faculty 2022, Guggenheim Fellowship 2019, American Academy of Arts and Letters Art Purchase Award, Anonymous Was a Woman Award, Skowgehan Resident Faculty 1999, Nancy Graves Grant for Visual Art, AXA Artist Award, Pollock Krasner Grant, Clocktower Studio Program
- Website: suzannemcclelland.net

Suzanne McClelland is a New York-based artist best known for abstract work based in language, speech, and sound.

== Early life and education ==
McClelland studied with photographer Joanne Leonard and painter Gerome Kamrowski at the University of Michigan, receiving a BFA in 1981. In 1989, she received a MFA from School of Visual Arts, citing Judy Pfaff and Ursula von Rydingsvard and Jackie Winsor as influential teachers.

== Work ==
McClelland's work has been exhibited at The Whitney Museum, both 2014 and 1993 Biennials; The New Museum, The Museum at University at Albany SUNY, and The Fralin Museum of Art at University of Virginia. Her work can be found in MOMA, The Walker, The Metropolitan Museum of Art, The Whitney Museum and Saatchi. She is currently on faculty with School of Visual Arts Fine Arts, MFA Program.

== Collections ==
- Albright Knox Art Gallery, Buffalo, New York
- Art Foundation Mallorca Collection, Mallorca, Spain
- Brooklyn Museum, Brooklyn, New York
- Detroit Institute of Art, Detroit, Michigan
- Fisher Landau Center For Art, Long Island City, New York
- Fralin Museum of Art, Charlottesville, Virginia
- Grunwald Center Collection, UCLA Hammer Museum, Los Angeles, California
- Agnes Gund, New York, New York
- Henry Art Gallery, University of Washington, Seattle, Washington
- The Margulies Collection, Miami, Florida
- Mead Art Museum, Amherst College, Amherst, Massachusetts
- Metropolitan Museum of Art, New York, New York
- Miami Art Museum, Miami, Florida
- Museum of Contemporary Art San Diego, San Diego, California
- Museum of Modern Art, New York, New York
- Neuberger Museum of Art, Purchase College, Purchase, New York
- New York Public Library Print Collection, New York, New York
- Nice Public Library, Nice, France
- Norton Museum of Art, West Palm Beach, Florida
- Orlando Museum of Art, Orlando, Florida
- Rhode Island School of Design Museum, Providence, Rhode Island
- The Rubell Family Collection
- St Louis Art Museum, St. Louis, Missouri
- Saatchi Gallery, London, UK
- University of Michigan Museum of Art, Ann Arbor, Michigan
- Walker Art Center, Minneapolis, Minnesota
- Whitney Museum of American Art, New York, New York
- Williams College Museum of Art, Williamstown, Massachusetts
- Yale University Art Gallery, Yale University, New Haven, Connecticut
- Zimmerli Art Museum at Rutgers University, New Brunswick, New Jersey
