= Dr. J.C. McClenathan House and Office =

Historic house in Pennsylvania, United States

- U.S. National Register of Historic Places
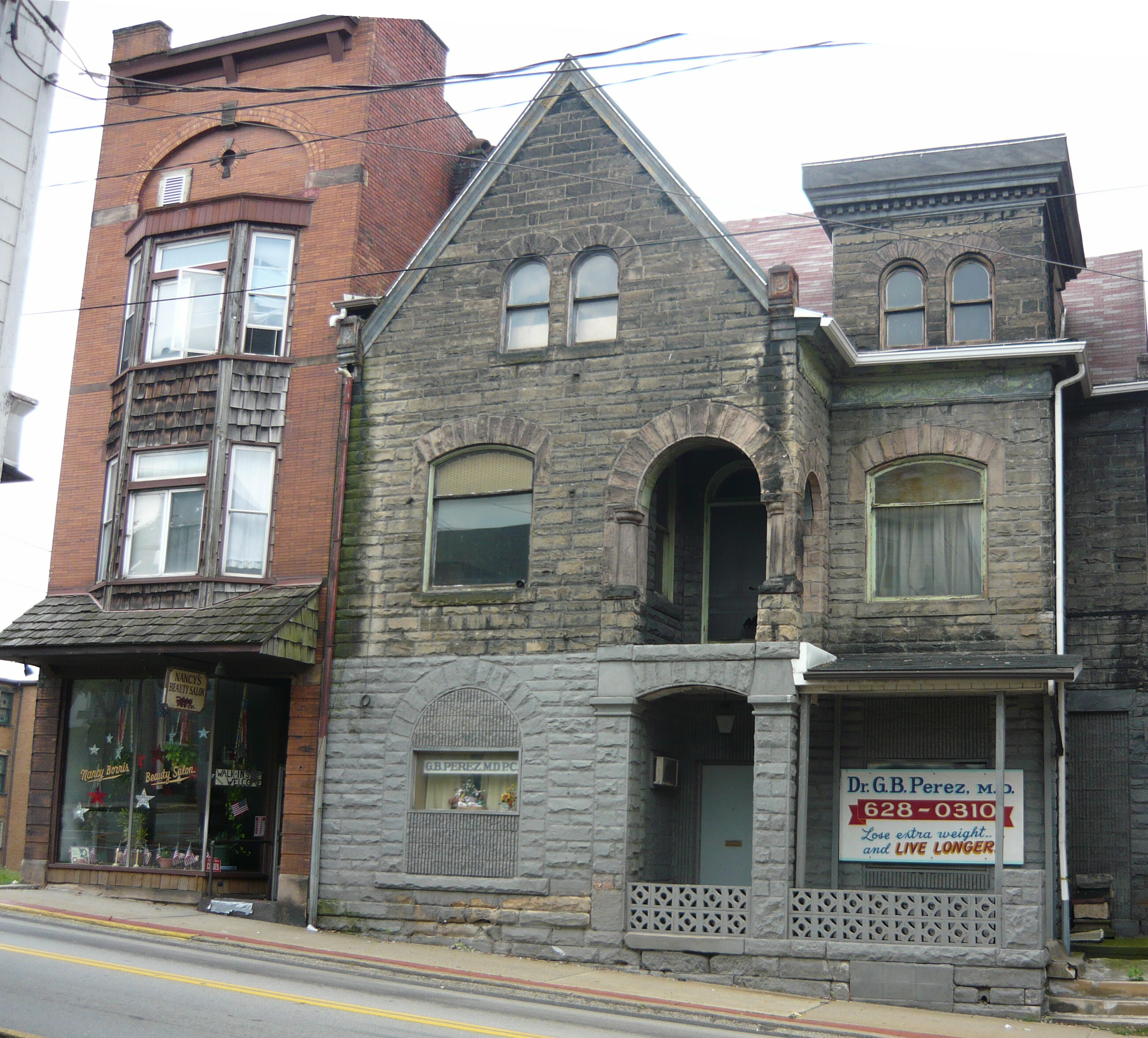
- McClenathan House, August 2009

- Location within Pennsylvania Location within the United States
- Location: 134 S. Pittsburgh St., Connellsville, Pennsylvania
- Coordinates: 40°1′1″N 79°35′23″W
- Area: less than one acre
- Built: c. 1895
- Architectural style: Romanesque, Queen Anne
- NRHP reference No.: 02001335
- Added to NRHP: November 15, 2002

Dr. J.C. McClenathan House and Office, also known as the Medical Center Building, is a historic home and doctor's office located at Connellsville, Fayette County, Pennsylvania. It was built about 1895, and is a 2 1/2-story building with Richardsonian Romanesque and Queen Anne style design details. The stone-clad building features a two-story inset porch, a sloped stone parapet, and three-story tower with decorative frieze.

It was added to the National Register of Historic Places in 2002.
