= Canal Place =

State park in Cumberland, Maryland

Coordinates: 39.649393°N 78.763411°W

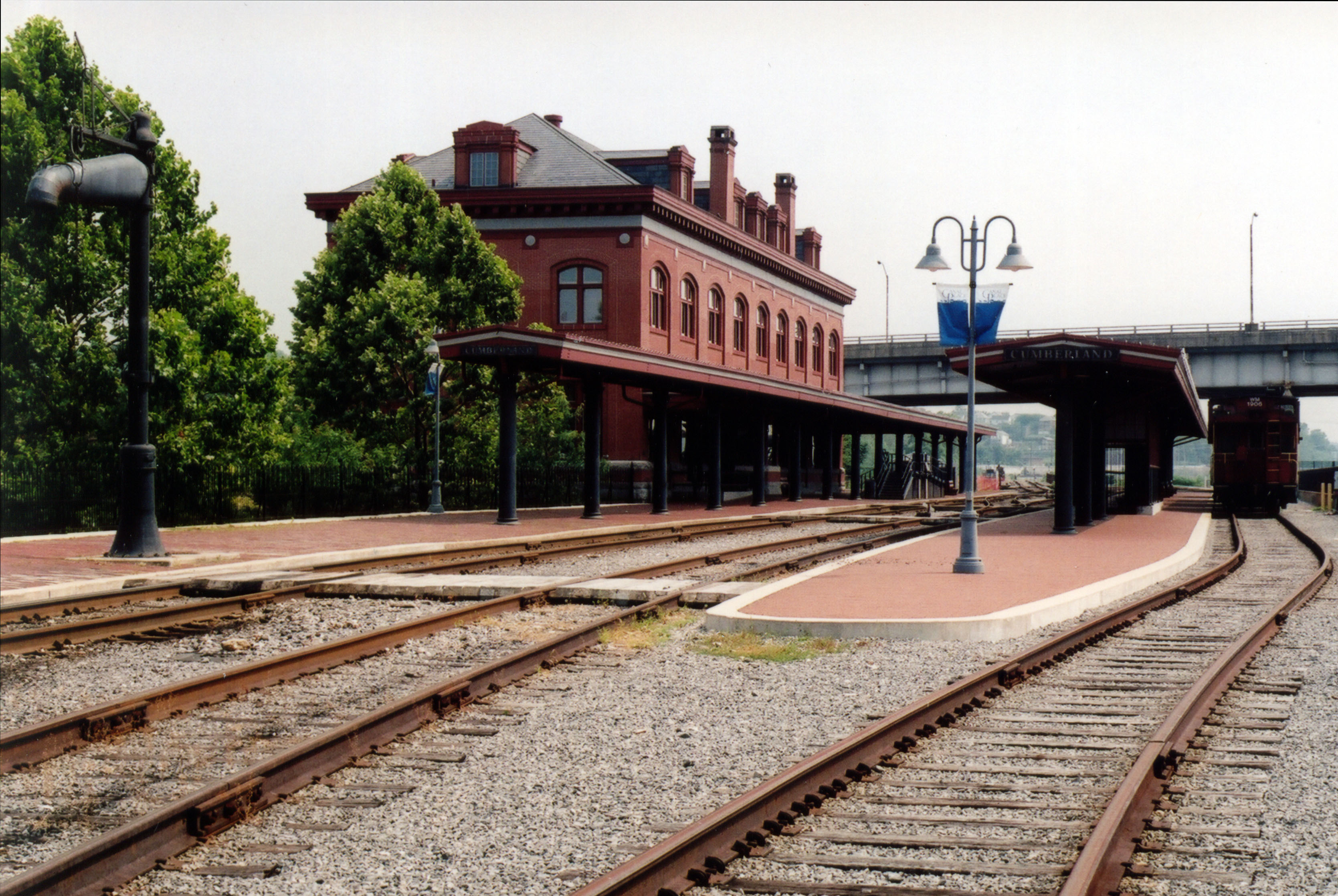
Western Maryland Railway station, built in 1913, now part of Canal Place

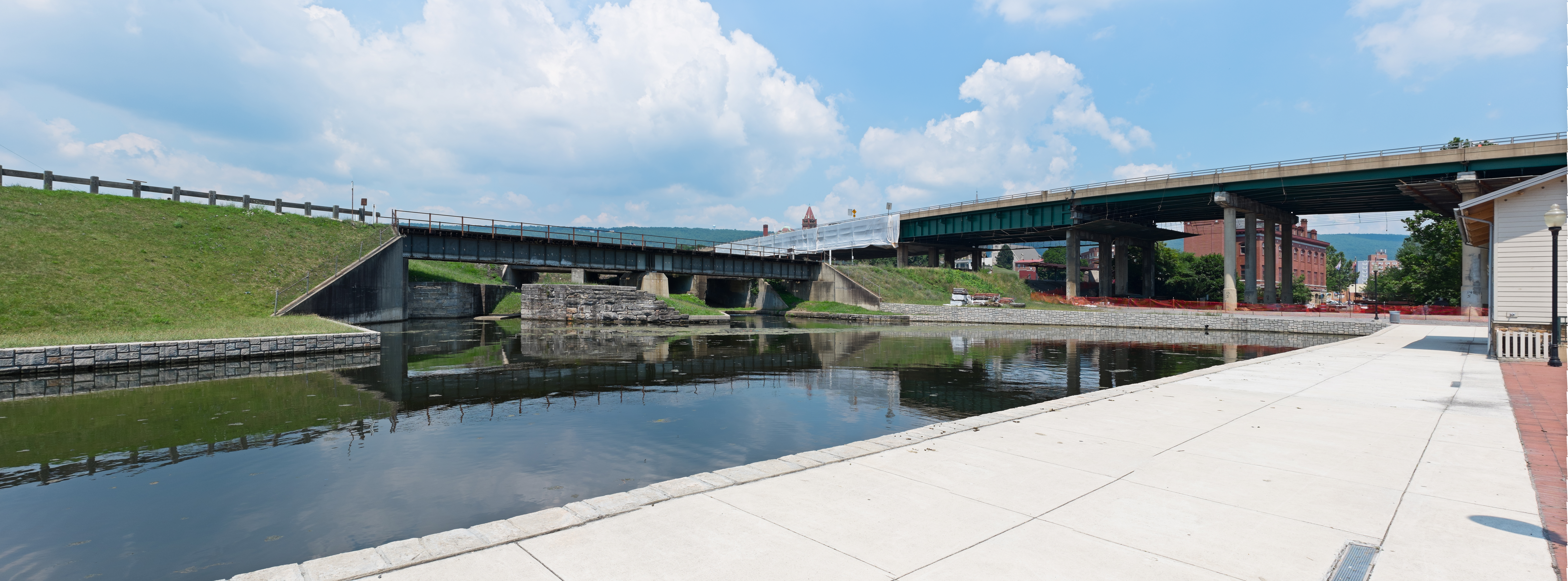
Cumberland basin (looking at Guard lock #8) at the end of the C & O Canal.

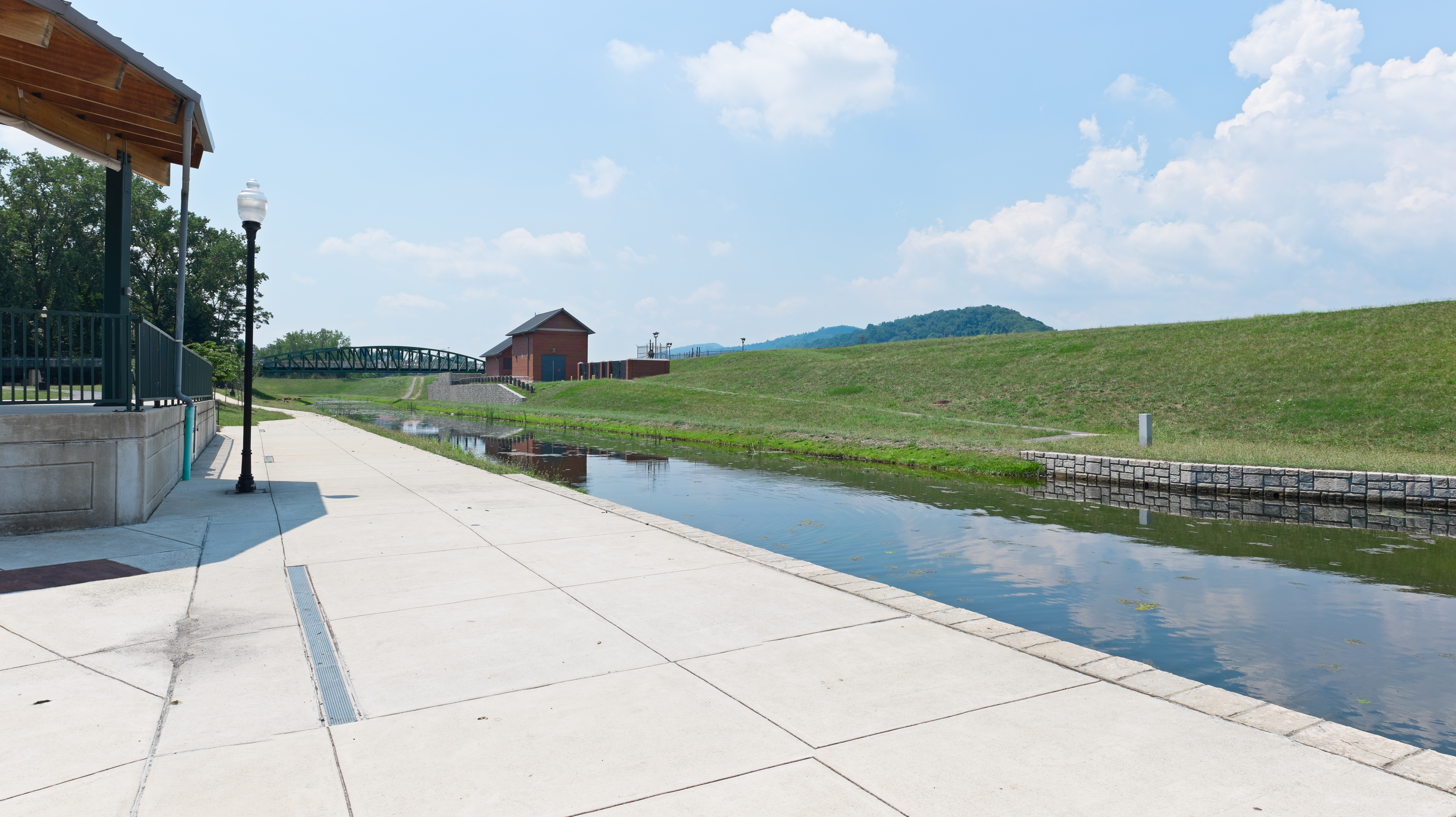
Cumberland basin at Canal Place, looking towards Georgetown (184.5 miles down the canal).

Canal Place is a 58.1-acre (235,000 m^{2}) heritage area located in Cumberland, Maryland at the western terminus of the Chesapeake and Ohio Canal.

== Overview ==
The park includes the station plaza, a picnic area, a canal boat replica, a pedestrian bridge to George Washington’s Headquarters (part of Fort Cumberland), picnic area, Shops at Canal Place, the Crescent Lawn Festival Grounds, and the Western Maryland Railway Station, which is on the National Register of Historic Places.

The Cumberland Visitor Center for the C&O Canal National Historical Park is located at Canal Place, and features interactive and educational displays about the history of the canal and the city of Cumberland. Exhibits tell the story of the canal's construction, cargo, mules, locks, and crew. The exhibit is operated by National Park Service and is located on the first floor of the railway station.

The Western Maryland Scenic Railroad offers rides on historic trains, and departs from the railway station.

"The Cumberland" is a full-size replica of a canal boat located in the Trestle Walk at Canal Place. During special events, costumed guides talk about the history of the canal and daily life aboard a canal boat. Visitors can tour the mule shed, hay house, and furnished Captain's cabin.

The Canal Place facilities are owned and managed by the Canal Place Preservation and Development Authority, an agency created by the State of Maryland in 1993.

== Gallery ==
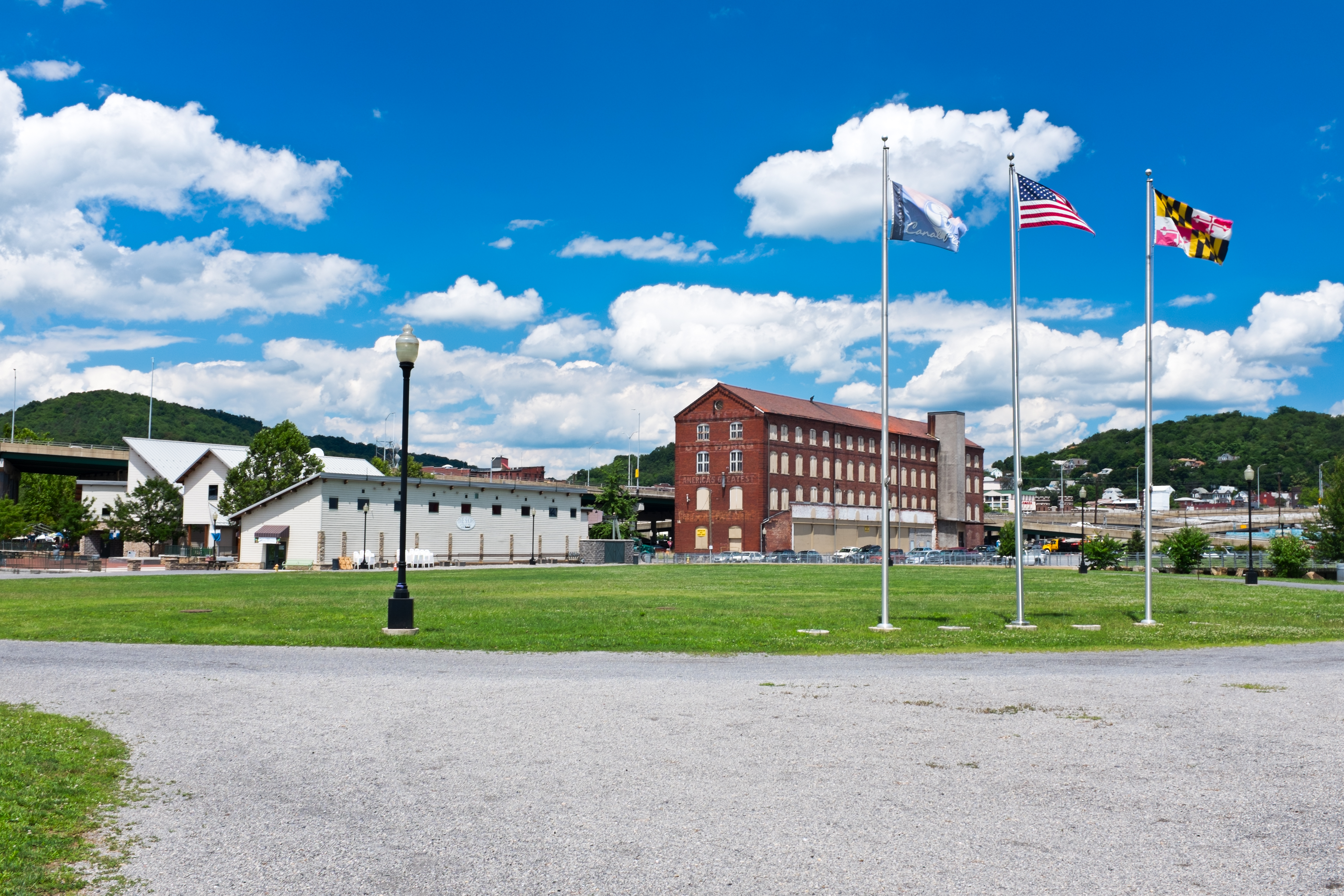
Large field at Canal place for gatherings.

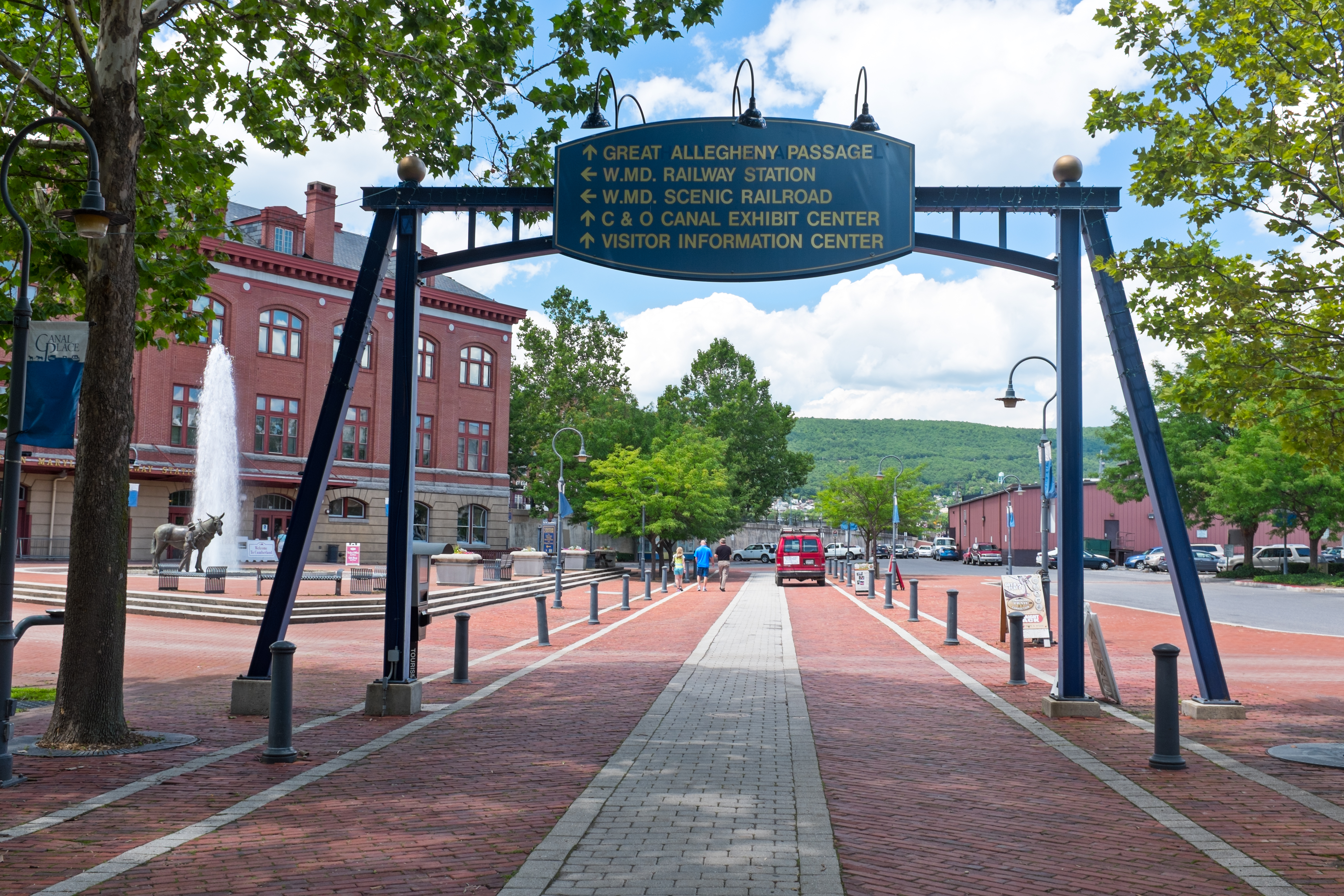
Looking towards Western MD RR Station museum

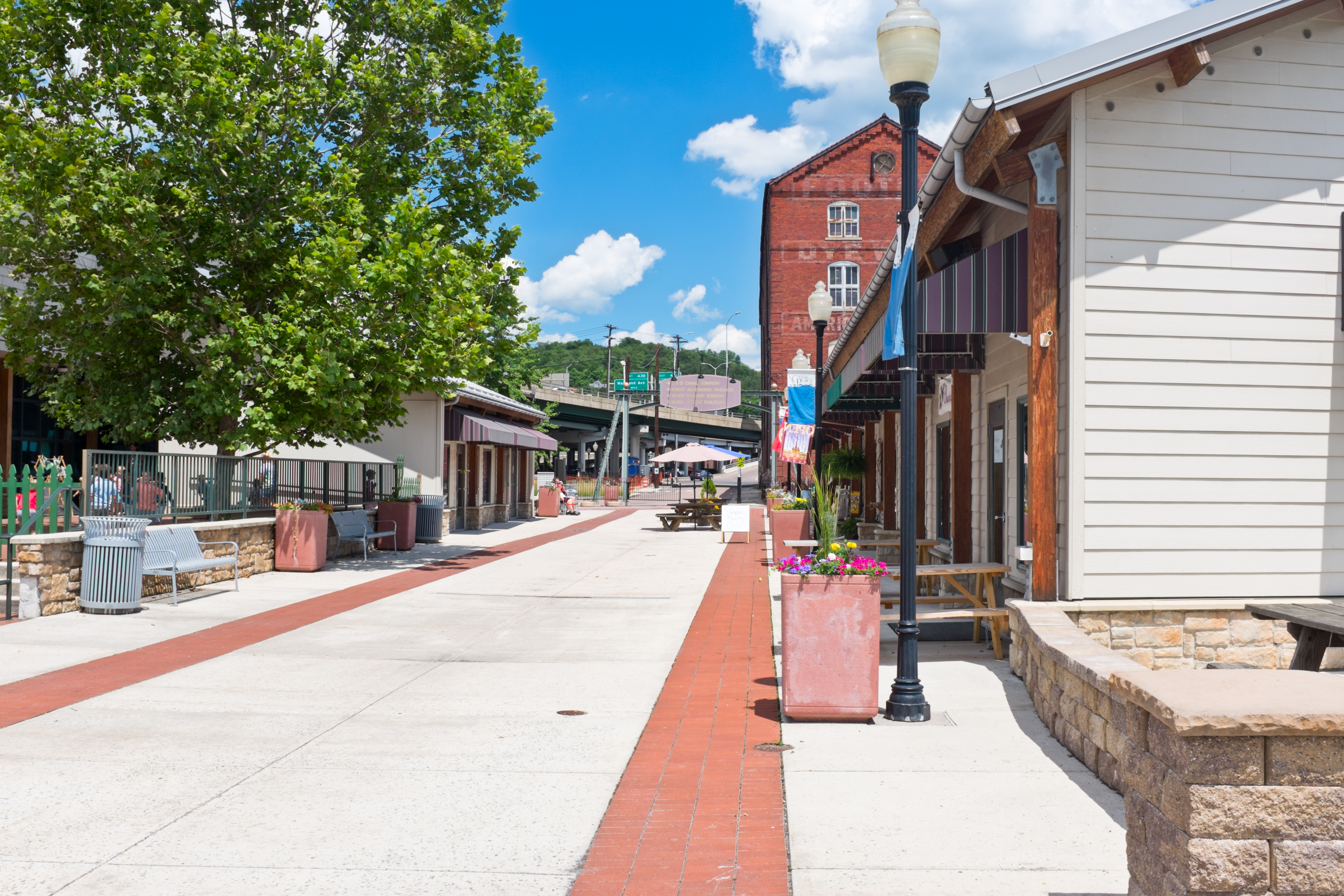
Row of shops at Canal Place.

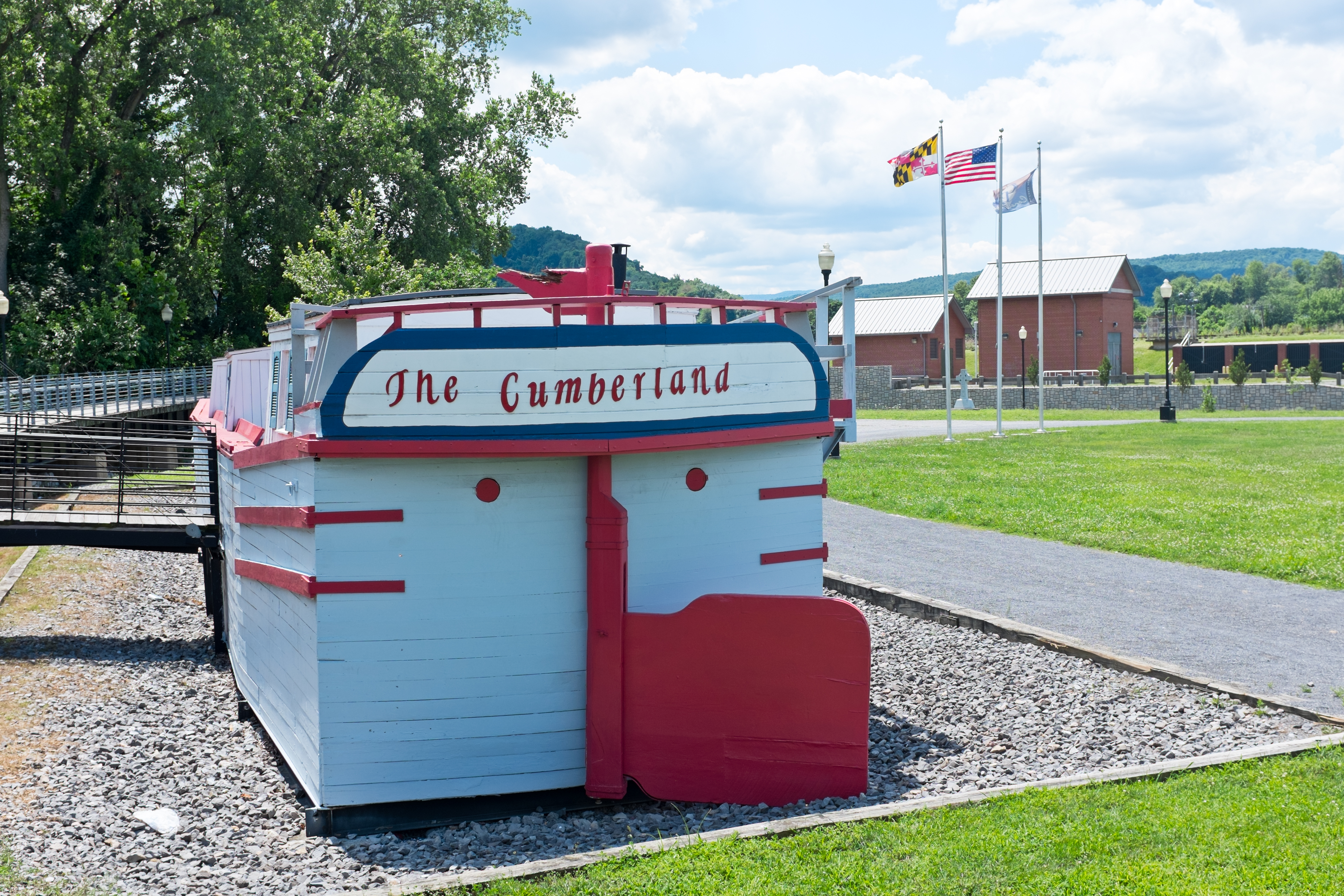
Replica, "The Cumberland", of a Canal boat at Canal place.

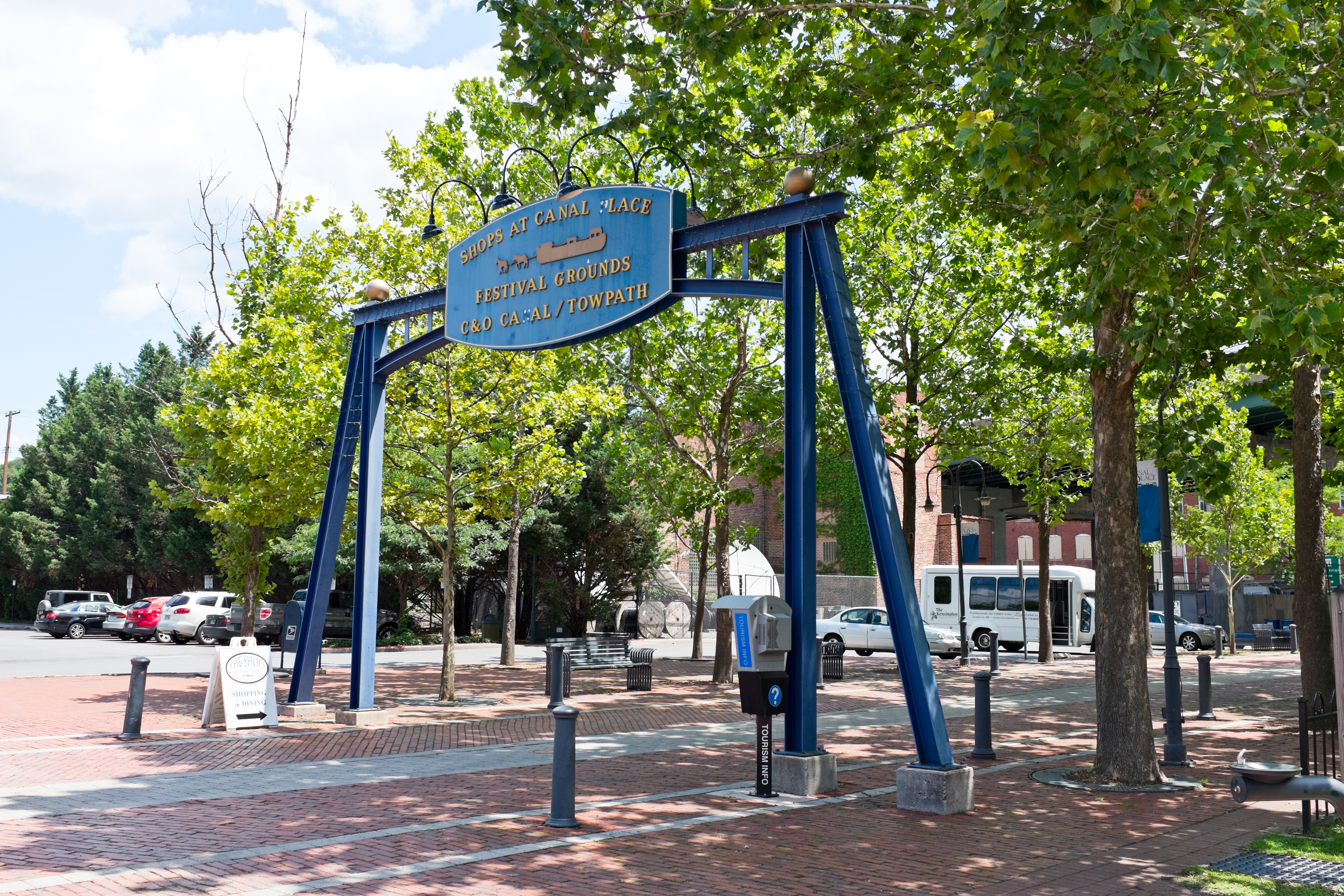
Entrance to the shops at Canal Place

== See also ==
- Downtown Cumberland Historic District
