= Peter Bradley (artist) =

American painter

- Bradley in 1971
- Born: September 15, 1940 (age 86); Connellsville, Pennsylvania, U.S.
- Spouses: Grace Burney (m. 1961–unknown); Suzanne McClelland (m. 1984; div. 1986) Deborah Roskowski (m. 1994)
- Children: 3, including Garrett
- Parent(s): Edith and William Bradley

Peter Bradley (born September 15, 1940) is an American painter and sculptor and former art dealer. He attended the Society of Arts and Crafts in Detroit and Yale University. His work was included in the 1973 Whitney Biennial. As an art dealer he was the associate director of the Perls Galleries from 1968 until 1975. He later donated his papers from this period to the Archives of American Art of the Smithsonian Institution. In 1971 while associate director of the Perls Galleries, Bradley curated The De Luxe Show under the auspices of the famed de Menil family in Houston, Texas, considered to be one of the early racially integrated art exhibitions in the United States.

Bradley is known to have had a direct effect on the New New Painters, a group with a core of nine abstract artists that developed in 1978 coincident with the invention and development of acrylic gel paint by the paint chemist Sam Golden.

Bradley's work is held in the permanent collections of the Museum of Modern Art; Metropolitan Museum of Art; Museum of Fine Arts, Houston; Minneapolis Institute of Art; African American Museum (Lose Angeles); André Emmerich Gallery; The Industrial Bank of Japan, Hong Kong; Aldrich Museum; Hayward Museum; University of Sydney; Princeton University; University of California, Berkeley; Dayton Art Institute, Dayton, Ohio; Chairman Bank, Boston, MA; Johannesburg Art Foundation, South Africa; Weatherspoon Art Museum, University of North Carolina at Greensboro; Art Museum of West Virginia University; the Stamford Museum and Nature Center, Stamford Connecticut.

Melvin Edwards seminal sculpture Curtain for William and Peter (1969/70) was created as an homage to Bradley and fellow artist William T. Williams.

Bradley is currently represented by the Karma Gallery in New York City.
