= Harold Betters =

American jazz trombone player (1928–2020)

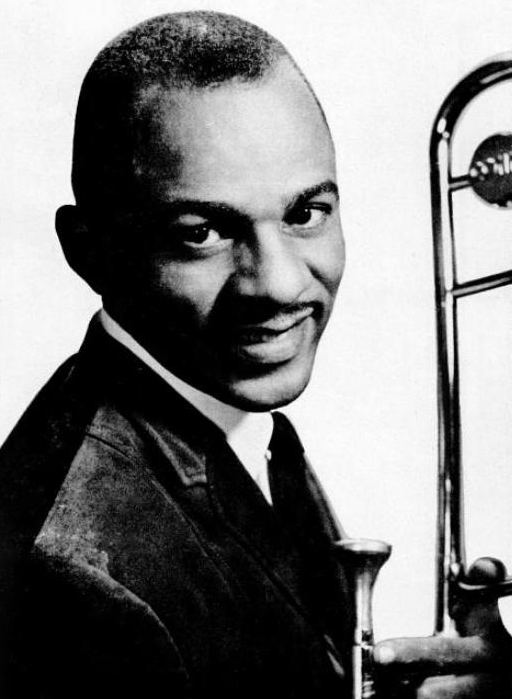
- Betters in 1964

Background information
- Born: March 21, 1928; Connellsville, Pennsylvania, U.S.
- Died: October 11, 2020 (aged 92)
- Genres: Jazz, funk, easy listening
- Occupation: Musician
- Instrument: Trombone

Harold Betters (March 21, 1928 – October 11, 2020) was an American jazz trombone player.

== Early life and education ==
Born in Connellsville, Pennsylvania, Betters was raised in Pittsburgh. While growing up, Betters' parents owned the Betters’ Grill and Hotel. Betters studied music education at Ithaca College for two years before being drafted into the United States Army during World War II. After the war ended, Betters studied at the Brooklyn Conservatory of Music for a year.

== Career ==
In 1952, Betters moved to Boston, where he met his wife, Marjorie. He toured with Dick Gregory and with the Ray Charles big band, playing at the Apollo Theatre. Thereafter, he led his own quartet which included pianist John Thomas and Jerry Betters on drums.

In the early 1960s, Betters returned to Pittsburgh with his family, where he worked as a session musician and performed at the Crawford Grill with Max Roach, Dizzy Gillespie, Stanley Turrentine, Roy Eldridge, and Sonny Rollins. Betters also performed in a group with his two brothers, one of whom was Jimmy (trumpet). Jimmy also played with the Molinaro marching band of Connellsville (est 1913) under direction of Amedeo Molinaro and Harold would occasionally join in on a parade.

Betters was known as "Mr. Trombone" and played in the style of Trummy Young and Bennie Green.

In late 1964, Betters had his only chart appearance on the US Hot 100 when the track, "Do Anything You Wanna, (Pt. 1)", peaked at #74.

== Personal life ==
Betters died on October 11, 2020, at the age of 92.

== Discography ==
- At the Encore (Gateway, 1962)
- Takes Off (Gateway, 1963)
- Even Better (Gateway, 1964)
- Meets Slide Hampton (Gateway, 1964)
- The Big Horn (H.B. Records)
- Swingin' on the Railroad (Gateway, 1965)
- Ram-bunk-shush (Reprise, 1965)
- Do Anything You Wanna (Gateway, 1966)
- Out of Sight and Sound (Reprise, 1966)
- Funk City Express (Reprise, 1966)
- ‘’On Your Account: Harold Betters In Concert With Dollar Savings Bank’’ (Bettersound Productions, 1969)
- Jazz Showcase (Gateway, 1977)
- With Friends, Live in New York (2001)
