= Carnegie Free Library (Connellsville, Pennsylvania) =

- U.S. National Register of Historic Places
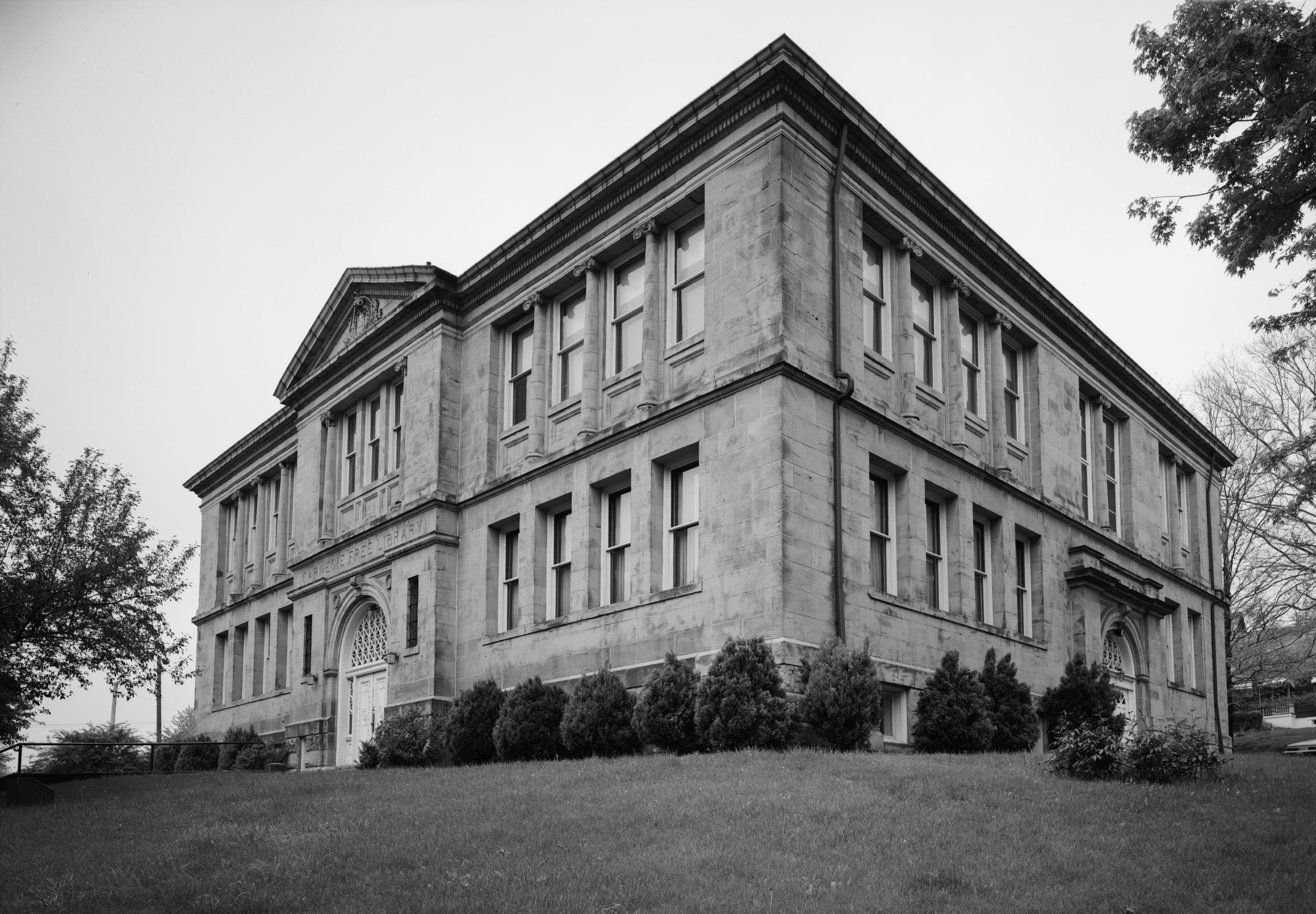
- Carnegie Free Library, May 1989

- Location within Pennsylvania Location within the United States
- Location: S. Pittsburgh St., Connellsville, Pennsylvania
- Coordinates: 40°0′56″N 79°35′19″W
- Area: 1.5 acres (0.61 ha)
- Built: 1901
- Built by: Nixon, J.A.
- Architect: McCollum, J.M.
- NRHP reference No.: 81000542
- Added to NRHP: October 8, 1981

Carnegie Free Library is a historic Carnegie library building located at Connellsville, Fayette County, Pennsylvania. It was designed and built in 1901, with funds partly provided by the philanthropist Andrew Carnegie. Carnegie provided $50,000 toward the construction of the Connellsville library. The grant was commissioned by Carnegie on April 22, 1899; it was the 13th library that he commissioned in America. It is a two-story Ohio buff stone structure with basement in the Italian Renaissance Revival style. The exterior features a terra cotta cornice and red Spanish tile roof. It measures 92.2 feet (28.1 m) by 74.6 feet (22.7 m).

It was added to the National Register of Historic Places in 1981.
