= Colonial National Bank Building =

- U.S. National Register of Historic Places
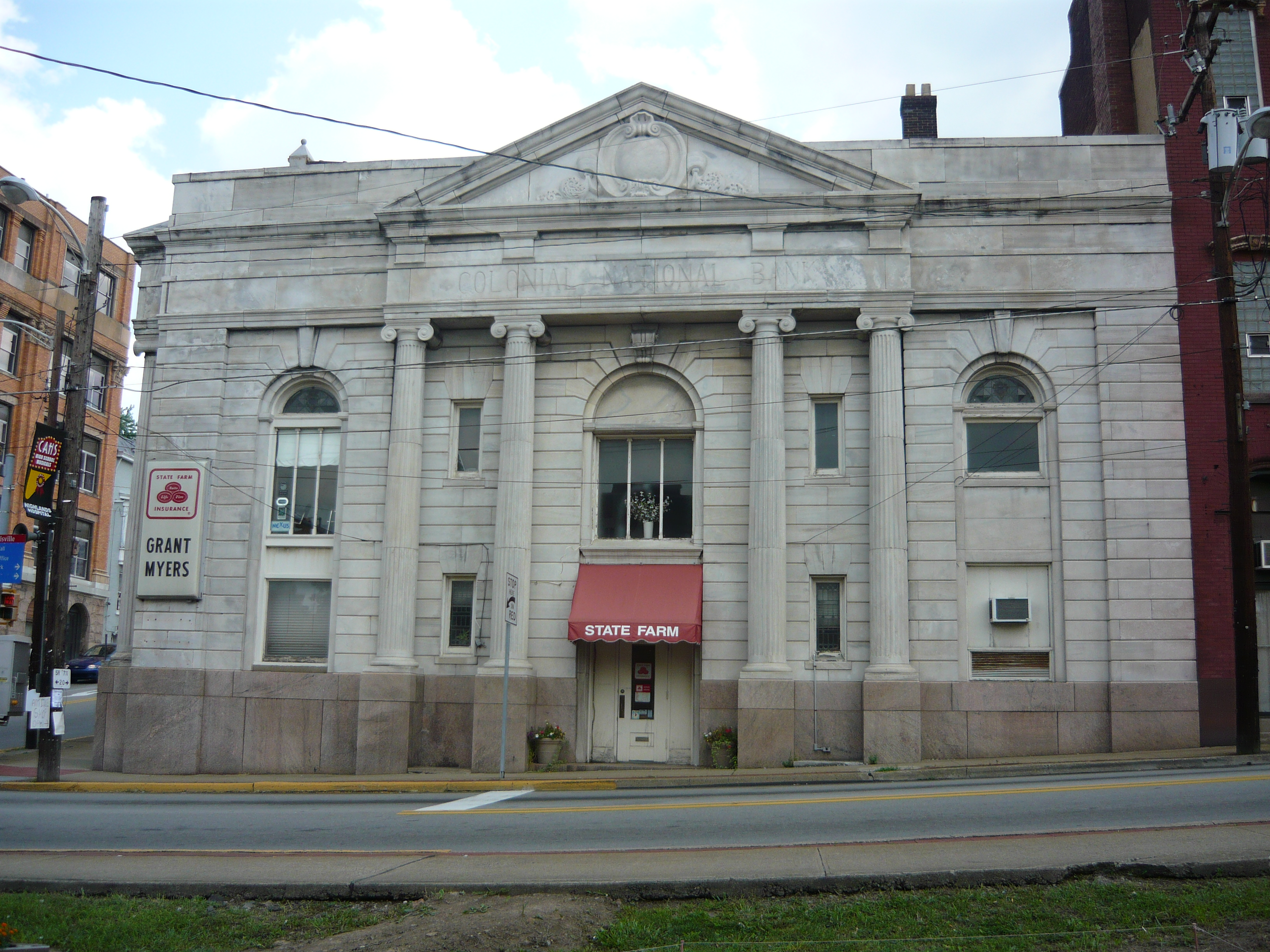
- Colonial National Bank Building, April 2008

- Location within Pennsylvania Location within the United States
- Location: 101 E. Crawford St., Connellsville, Pennsylvania
- Coordinates: 40°01′03″N 79°35′21″W
- Area: 0 acres (0 ha)
- Architectural style: Classical Revival
- NRHP reference No.: 02001337
- Added to NRHP: November 15, 2002

Colonial National Bank Building, also known as the Grant Myers Building, is a historic bank building located at Connellsville, Fayette County, Pennsylvania. It was built in 1906, as a one-story, open bank building. It was remodeled during the 1930s, to be two-stories. It has two Classical Revival facades, featuring four, two-story Ionic order columns supporting a pediment on each side.

It was added to the National Register of Historic Places in 2002.
