= Daniel LaRue Johnson =

American painter (1938–2017)

- Born: Daniel LaRue Johnson; 1938; Los Angeles, California, United States
- Died: 2017 (aged 78–79)
- Education: Chouinard Art Institute
- Known for: Painting, sculpture
- Spouse: Virginia Jaramillo (m. 1960)

Daniel LaRue Johnson (1938–2017) was an American abstract sculptor, painter, and printmaker.

== Early life and education ==
Daniel LaRue Johnson was born in 1938 in Los Angeles. While in high school, he met painter Virginia Jaramillo. Johnson staged his first solo art exhibition in 1953 at a community center in Pasadena. He took classes with Jaramillo at the Otis Art Institute, and the couple married in 1960. Johnson then attended the Chouinard Art Institute in the early 1960s.

== Life and career ==
Johnson attended the March on Washington for Jobs and Freedom in 1963 and traveled throughout the American South for several months afterwards. During his travels he scavenged materials to use in his artwork, including protest buttons, a mousetrap, and broken dolls. Many of his works from this period comprise assemblages of found objects that Johnson painted black, which reference the Civil Rights Movement and racial violence in the United States.

In 1965, Johnson was awarded a Guggenheim Fellowship. He used the funds to travel to Paris with his wife Jaramillo, and studied there for a year under sculptor Alberto Giacometti. They returned to New York following the year of study. After moving back to the United States, Johnson began to work primarily in abstract painting and minimalist sculpture.

In 1969, Johnson and Jaramillo moved into a 5000 square foot loft in New York's SoHo neighborhood. The same year, Johnson participated in Frank Bowling's exhibition 5+1 at SUNY Stony Brook featuring work by black abstract artists. Johnson showed a thin, elongated pyramidal sculpture painted with vertical stripes of various colors.

Johnson was a longtime friend of political scientist and diplomat Ralph Bunche, who had attended high school with Johnson's father and received the Nobel Peace Prize in 1970. After Bunch's death in 1971, Johnson was commissioned to create a sculpture in his memory, permanently installed in New York's Ralph Bunche Park in 1980. The abstract steel sculpture is a 50-foot tall, thin pyramid form with several rectangular cut-outs at its base; the work faces the headquarters of the United Nations, which Bunche had helped form and lead for several decades.

In the early 2010s, Johnson and Jaramillo left their longtime SoHo loft and relocated to Long Island, moving to a house in Hampton Bays.

== Personal life ==
Johnson married painter Virginia Jaramillo in 1960 after the two met in high school. Johnson died in 2017.

== Notable works in public collections ==
- Untitled (1961), San Francisco Museum of Modern Art
- Freedom Now, Number 1 (1963–1964), Museum of Modern Art, New York
- Untitled (1964), Museum of Contemporary Art, Los Angeles
- Nations (1976), Studio Museum in Harlem, New York
- Lines and Colors (date unknown), Cleveland Museum of Art
