= Connellsville Union Passenger Depot =

- U.S. National Register of Historic Places
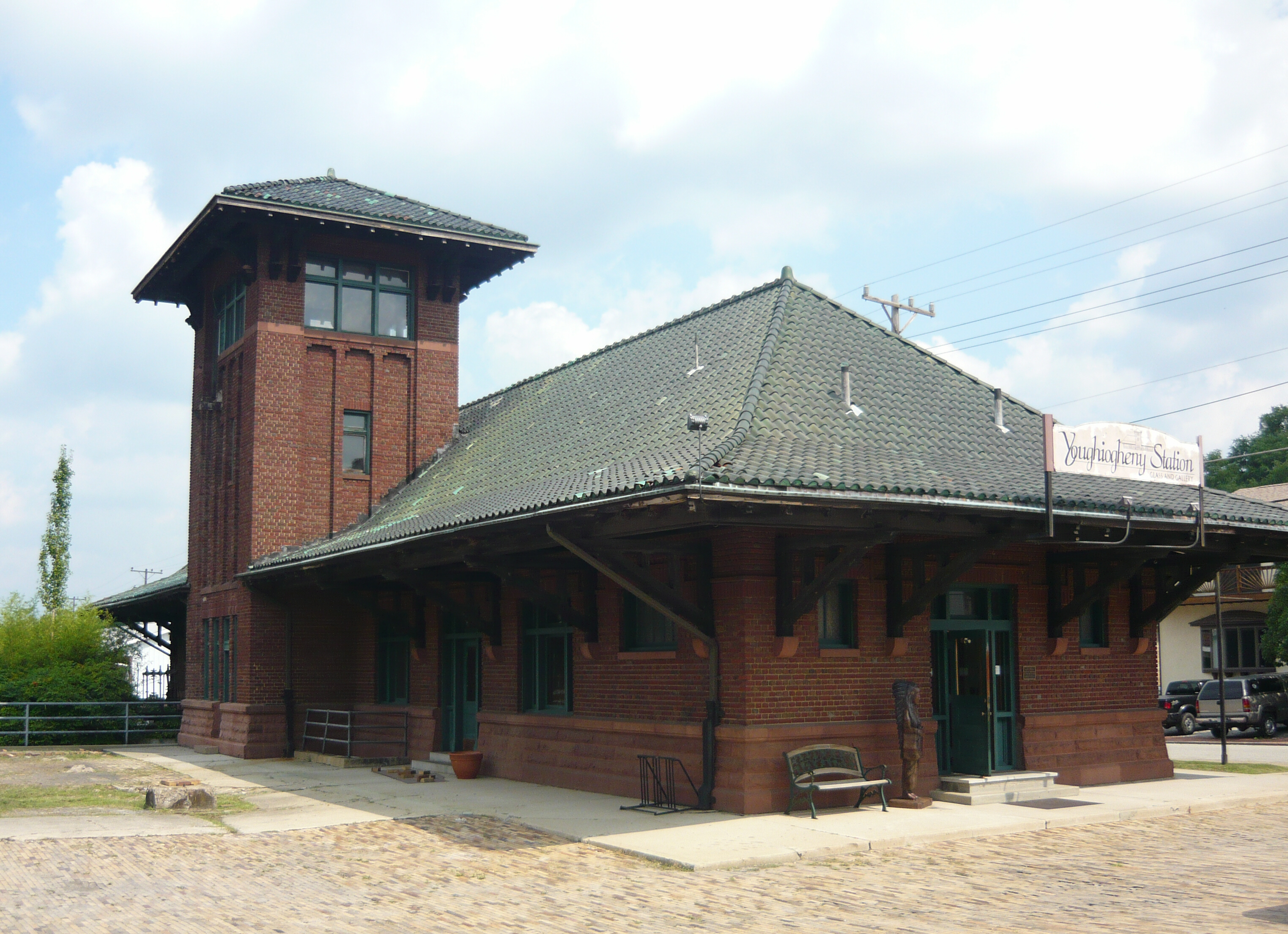
- Connellsville Union Passenger Depot, July 2009

- Location within Pennsylvania Location within the United States
- Location: 900 W. Crawford Ave., Connellsville, Pennsylvania
- Coordinates: 40°0′59″N 79°35′58″W
- Area: less than one acre
- Built: 1911-1912
- Built by: Pittsburgh and Lake Erie Railroad; Western Maryland Railroad
- Architectural style: Bungalow/craftsman
- NRHP reference No.: 96000319
- Added to NRHP: March 29, 1996

Connellsville Union Passenger Depot, also known as the Connellsville Pittsburgh & Lake Erie Station, is a historic railway station located at Connellsville, Fayette County, Pennsylvania. It was built between 1911 and 1912 by the Pittsburgh and Lake Erie Railroad and Western Maryland Railway. It is a 1 1/2-story, rectangular brick building measuring 109 feet by 28 feet. It features a three-story tower, wide overhanging eaves, and hipped roofs on the building and tower covered in blue-green Spanish terra cotta tiles. It is in an American Craftsman style of architecture. It ceased use as a passenger station in 1939, after which it housed a car dealership and auto parts store. It was purchased by the Youghiogheny Opalescent Glass Company in the spring of 1995.

It was added to the National Register of Historic Places in 1996.

== See also ==
- Connellsville station

Preceding station	New York Central Railroad	Following station
Crossland toward Pittsburgh	Youghiogheny Branch	Terminus
Preceding station	Western Maryland Railway	Following station
Terminus	Cumberland – Connellsville	Indian Creek toward Cumberland
