= Connellsville, Pennsylvania =

City in the United States

- City
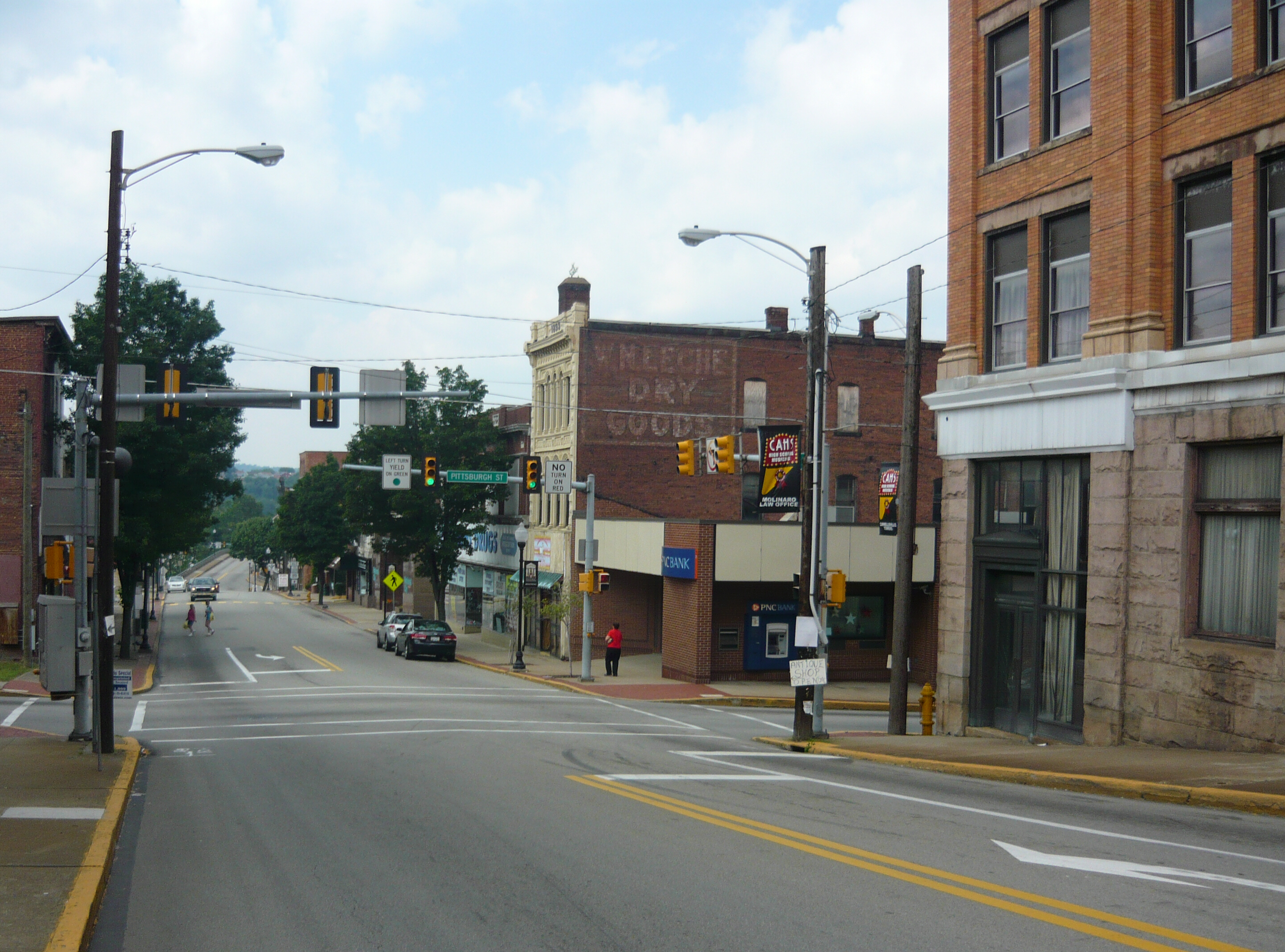
- East Crawford Avenue

- Seal Logo

- Location of Connellsville in Fayette County, Pennsylvania.

- Location of Connellsville within Pennsylvania Connellsville, Pennsylvania (the United States)
- Coordinates: 40°0′58″N 79°35′24″W
- Country: United States
- State: Pennsylvania
- County: Fayette
- Established: March 1, 1806
- Incorporated: May 12, 1911
- Founder: Zachariah Connell
- Named for: Zachariah Connell

Area
  - Total: 2.27 sq mi (5.87 km^{2})
  - Land: 2.18 sq mi (5.65 km^{2})
  - Water: 0.085 sq mi (0.22 km^{2})
- Elevation: 919 ft (280 m)

Population (2020)
  - Total: 7,031
  - Density: 3,222.4/sq mi (1,244.16/km^{2})
- Time zone: UTC−4 (EST)
  - Summer (DST): UTC−5 (EDT)
- ZIP Code: 15425
- Area code: 724
- FIPS code: 42-15776
- Website: connellsville.us

Connellsville is a city in Fayette County, Pennsylvania, United States, 36 miles (58 km) southeast of Pittsburgh and 50 miles (80 km) away via the Youghiogheny River, a tributary of the Monongahela River. It is part of the Pittsburgh metropolitan area. The population was 7,031 at the 2020 census.

== History ==
During the French and Indian War, a British army commanded by General Edward Braddock approached Fort Duquesne and crossed the Youghiogheny River at Stewart's Crossing, which is situated in the middle of what is now the city of Connellsville.

Connellsville was officially founded as a township in 1793 then as a borough on March 1, 1806, by Zachariah Connell, a militia captain during the American Revolution. In February 1909, balloting in New Haven and Connellsville resulted in these two boroughs joining and becoming the first city in Fayette County on May 12, 1911.

Due to the city's location in the center of the Connellsville Coalfield, coal mining, coke production, and other accompanying industries became the major sources of employment and revenue during the late 19th and early 20th centuries. Connellsville became known as the "Coke Capital of the World" due to the amount and quality of coke produced in the area's many beehive ovens.

In August of 2016, the city was hit with a major rainstorm that flooded the local community known as Dutch Bottom, along with several other areas. The city received help from neighboring communities and FEMA. The city recovered after nearly 2 years, and most of the affected area in Dutch Bottom is no longer habitable due to terms of agreements with FEMA and others to buy out the affected area.

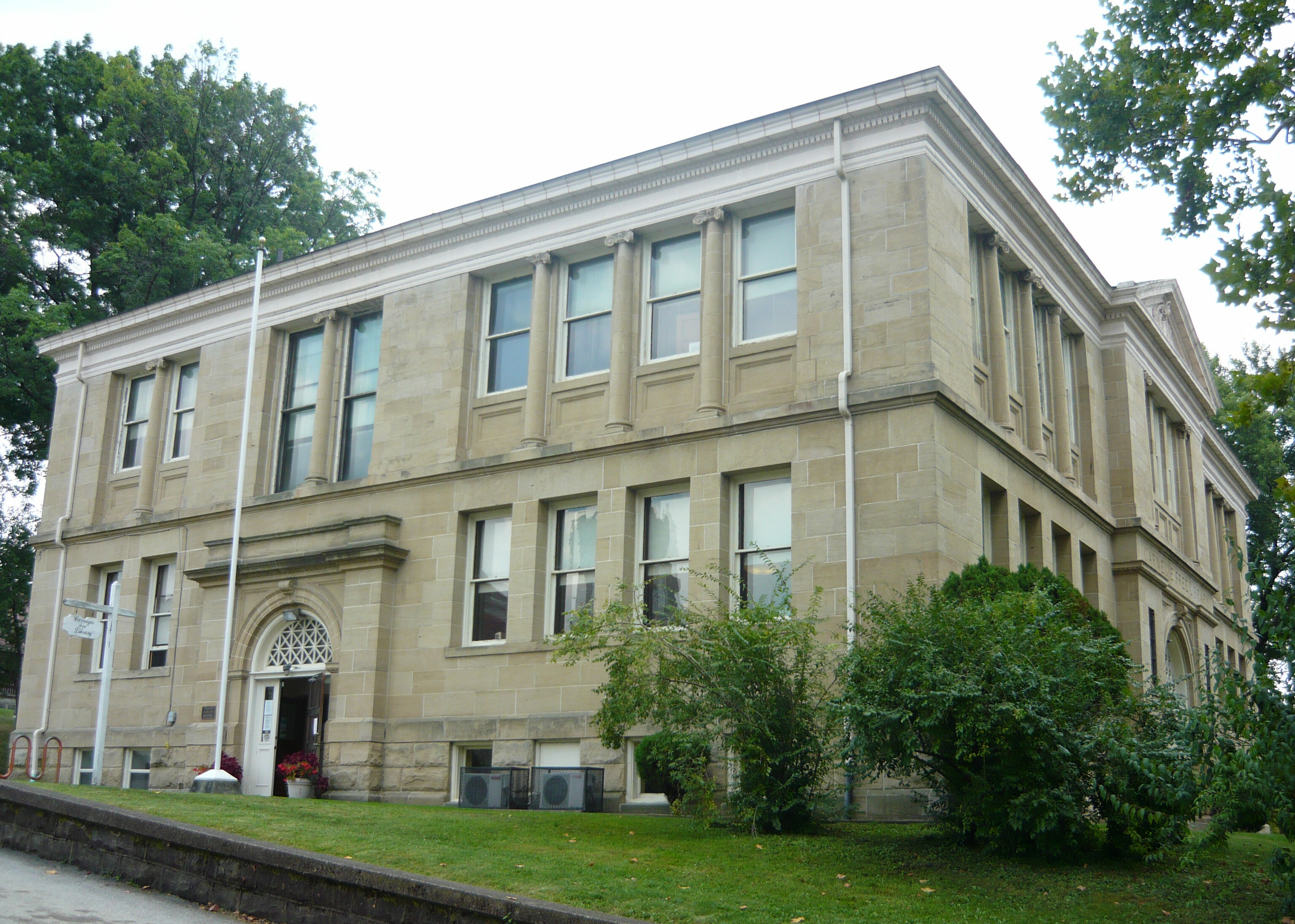
Carnegie Free Library (1903)
National Register of Historic Places

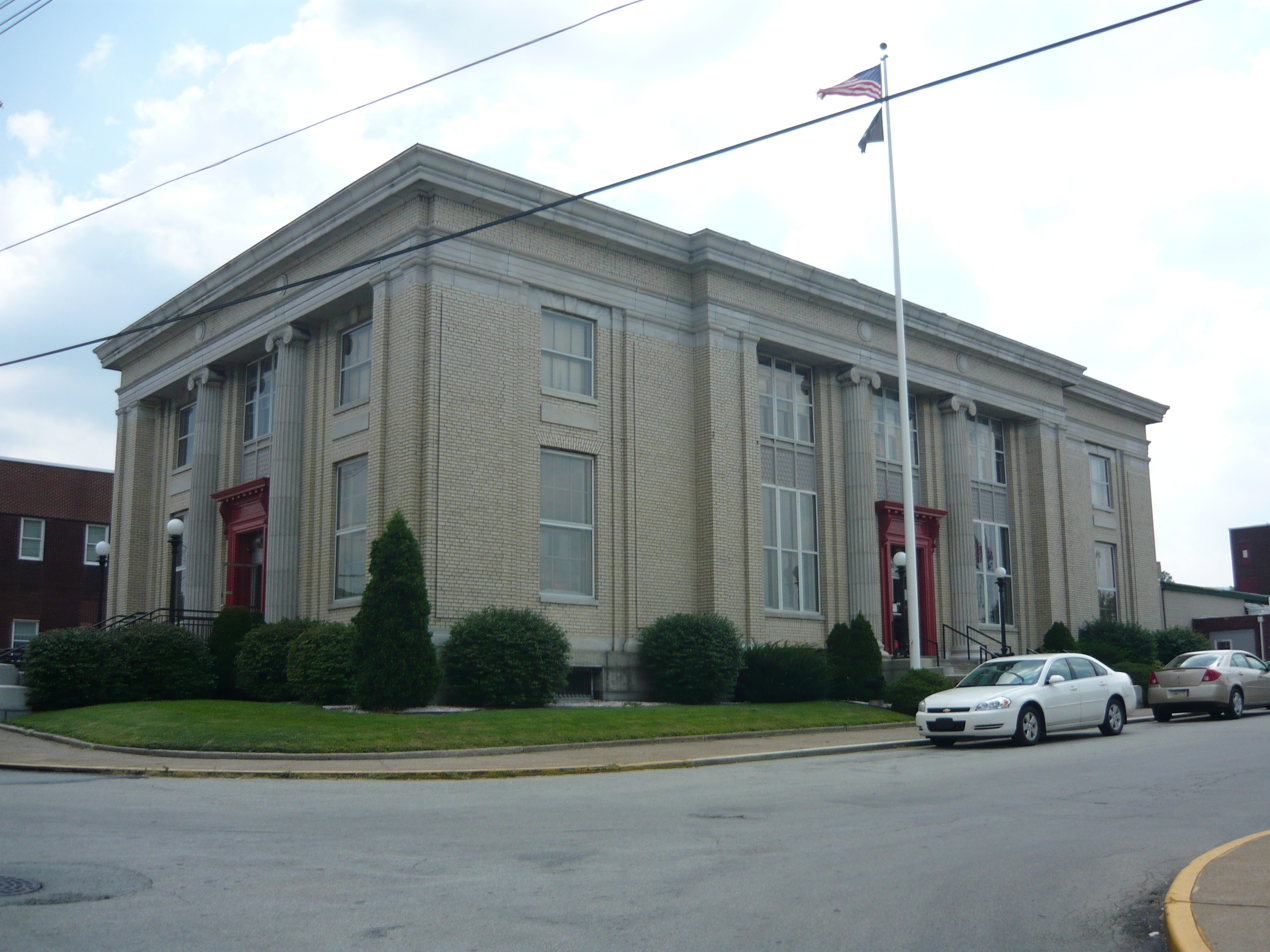
US Post Office (1913)
National Register of Historic Places

== Geography ==
Connellsville is located in northeastern Fayette County along the Youghiogheny River, a northward-flowing tributary of the Monongahela River. The city lies on both sides of the river, with the downtown on the eastern side. It is bordered to the south by the borough of South Connellsville. U.S. Route 119 passes through the northern and western sides of the city, leading north 22 miles (35 km) to Greensburg and southwest 11 miles (18 km) to Uniontown, the Fayette County seat. Pittsburgh is 50 miles (80 km) to the northwest via US 119 and Interstate 76.

According to the U.S. Census Bureau, Connellsville has a total area of 2.29 square miles (5.92 km^{2}), of which 2.18 square miles (5.65 km^{2}) is land and 0.10 square miles (0.27 km^{2}), or 4.63%, is water.

== Demographics ==
Historical population
Census	Pop.	Note	%±
1860	996		—
1870	1,292		29.7%
1880	3,609		179.3%
1890	5,629		56.0%
1900	7,160		27.2%
1910	12,845		79.4%
1920	13,804		7.5%
1930	13,290		−3.7%
1940	13,608		2.4%
1950	13,293		−2.3%
1960	12,814		−3.6%
1970	11,643		−9.1%
1980	10,319		−11.4%
1990	9,229		−10.6%
2000	9,146		−0.9%
2010	7,637		−16.5%
2020	7,031		−7.9%

=== 2020 census ===
As of the 2020 census, Connellsville had a population of 7,031. The median age was 42.8 years. 21.1% of residents were under the age of 18 and 20.8% of residents were 65 years of age or older. For every 100 females there were 95.6 males, and for every 100 females age 18 and over there were 91.6 males age 18 and over.

100.0% of residents lived in urban areas, while 0.0% lived in rural areas.

There were 3,174 households in Connellsville, of which 24.4% had children under the age of 18 living in them. Of all households, 34.2% were married-couple households, 22.2% were households with a male householder and no spouse or partner present, and 34.9% were households with a female householder and no spouse or partner present. About 38.4% of all households were made up of individuals and 18.0% had someone living alone who was 65 years of age or older.

There were 3,702 housing units, of which 14.3% were vacant. The homeowner vacancy rate was 1.8% and the rental vacancy rate was 16.0%.

Racial composition as of the 2020 census
Race	Number	Percent
White	6,301	89.6%
Black or African American	345	4.9%
American Indian and Alaska Native	12	0.2%
Asian	28	0.4%
Native Hawaiian and Other Pacific Islander	2	0.0%
Some other race	25	0.4%
Two or more races	318	4.5%
Hispanic or Latino (of any race)	108	1.5%

=== 2000 census ===
As of the 2000 census, there were 9,146 people, 3,963 households, and 2,377 families residing in the city. The population density was 4,053.5 inhabitants per square mile (1,565.1/km^{2}). There were 4,434 housing units at an average density of 1,965.2 per square mile (758.8/km^{2}). The racial makeup of the city was 94.54% White, 3.93% Black, 0.13% American Indian, 0.33% Asian, 0.17% from other races, and 0.90% from two or more races. Hispanic or Latino of any race were 0.54% of the population.

There were 3,963 households, out of which 28.2% had children under the age of 18 living with them, 40.3% were married couples living together, 15.5% had a female householder with no husband present, and 40.0% were non-families. Of all households, 35.9% were made up of individuals, and 19.0% had someone living alone who was 65 years of age or older. The average household size was 2.28 and the average family size was 2.97.

In the city, the population was spread out, with 24.5% under the age of 18, 7.9% from 18 to 24, 27.6% from 25 to 44, 20.7% from 45 to 64, and 19.3% who were 65 years of age or older. The median age was 38 years. For every 100 females, there were 86.9 males. For every 100 females age 18 and over, there were 80.7 males.

The median income for a household in the city was $21,070, and the median income for a family was $28,105. Males had a median income of $28,942 versus $23,016 for females. The per capita income for the city was $14,165. About 22.4% of families and 28.2% of the population were below the poverty line, including 45.5% of those under age 18 and 16.4% of those age 65 or over.

== Media ==
The Daily Courier, a newspaper based in the city, has been in publication for over a century. Since 1997, it has been owned and operated by the Tribune-Review Publishing Company.

== Parks and trails ==
The Youghiogheny River Trail, a part of the Great Allegheny Passage, runs through Connellsville. The trail provides a significant portion of the town's income and has provided a recent resurgence to the town, the likes of which have not been seen since Connellsville was known as the "Coke Capital of the World". In 2023, Pennsylvania Governor Josh Shapiro chose to use Connellsville as the backdrop for his launch of the state's new "Office of Outdoor Recreation".

East Park was created by the Works Progress Administration. Laborers transformed what had been a city garbage dump along Connell Run, near Wills Road, into East Park. The park was dedicated on October 12, 1940. Its location in a hollow contributes to many unique features, which include an underground entrance tunnel along Connell Run, a castle lookout up above, a large outside stage bandshell, many stone walls and pillars, and a waterfall at one end.

== Transportation ==
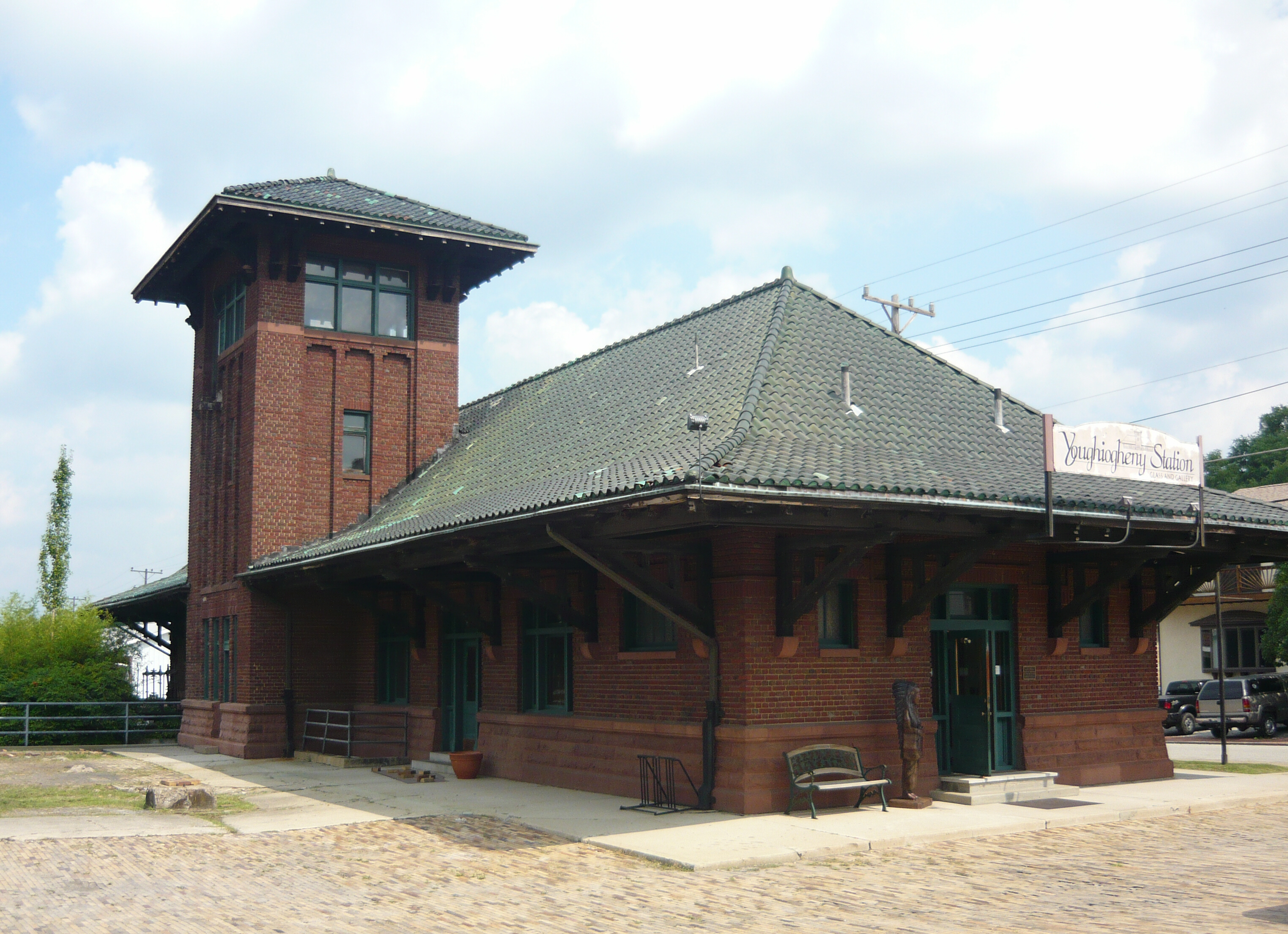
Union Passenger Depot / P&LE (1913) National Register of Historic Places

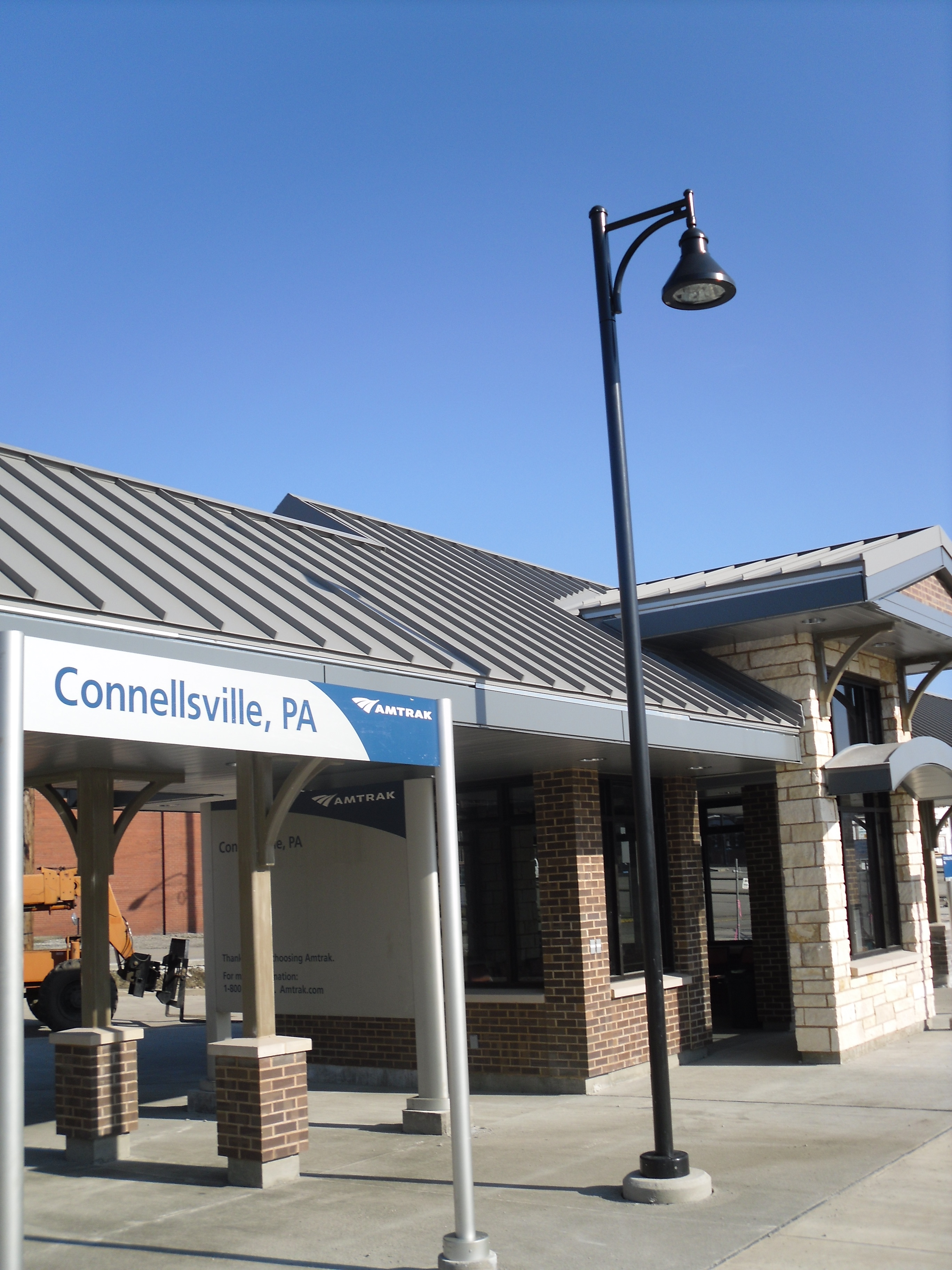
Connellsville Amtrak Station (Capitol Limited line)

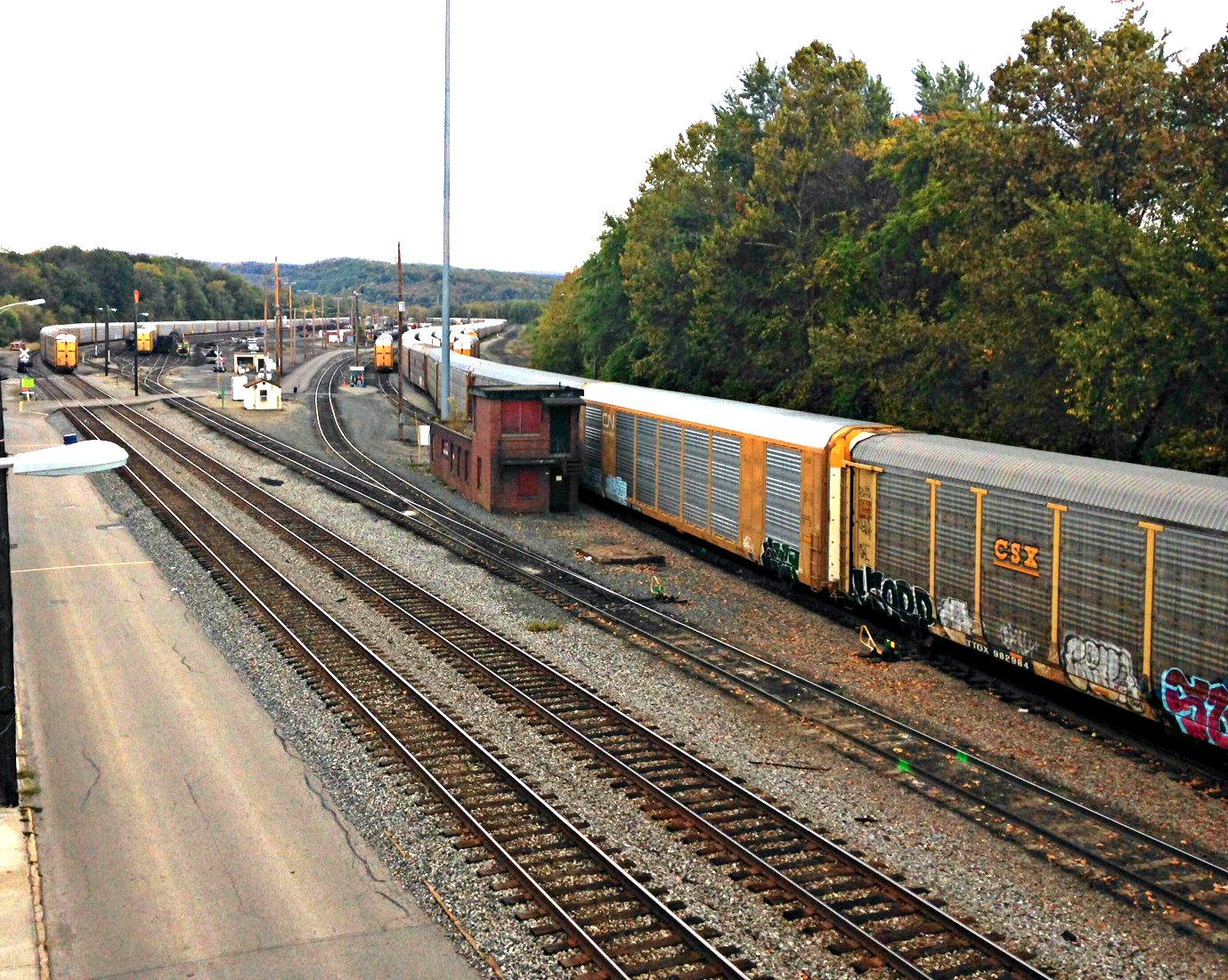
Looking south at the Connellsville rail yard from West Crawford Avenue

=== Railroads ===
Connellsville has the distinction of having been served at one time by five railroads: the Baltimore and Ohio Railroad, the Pennsylvania Railroad, the Western Maryland Railway, the Pittsburgh and Lake Erie Railroad, and the Norfolk and Western Railroad.

The Baltimore and Ohio Railroad (now CSX Transportation) entered Connellsville on the right (east) side of the Youghiogheny River. This main line originated in Baltimore, passed through Cumberland, Maryland heading west followed the river to Pittsburgh, then continuing on to Chicago.

The Pennsylvania Railroad's Southwest branch from Greensburg entered Connellsville from Connellsville Township, crossing Route 119 and the North End, then crossing the Youghiogheny on a trestle in the middle of the town; this line terminated in Uniontown, Pennsylvania. The line has been abandoned, and the trestle was demolished in the late 1980s. It remains as a coal loading facility behind the location of the former Back Creek Lumber Co where the line was severed. This line is now operated by the Southwest Pennsylvania Railroad.

The Western Maryland Railroad's line crossed the Alleghenies from Cumberland and entered Connellsville on the right side of the Youghiogheny River, connecting with two separate railroad companies. The first connection was with the Pittsburgh and Lake Erie Railroad's line from Pittsburgh which continued down the right side of the river to Pittsburgh. This was in direct competition with the B & O directly across the river. The second connection of the Western Maryland was to the Norfolk and Western Railroad which crossed the river to the left side on the former Pittsburgh & West Virginia railroad bridge.

The Norfolk & Western branch was acquired by the Wheeling and Lake Erie Railroad, which built a new connection on the left side of the river to CSX, which severed the old line across the bridge. This historic bridge is now threatened with demolition. Several of these former railway lines have been abandoned and the right of way acquired for other uses. The former Western Maryland Railroad and Pittsburgh & Lake Erie lines are now the part of the Youghiogheny River Trail.

Amtrak's Floridian provides passenger rail service to Connellsville, with service to Chicago, Pittsburgh, Washington, D.C., Miami, and other points in between.

=== West Penn Railways ===
Historically, the mining and steel working Connellsville–Greensburg–Scottdale–Jeannette–Mt Pleasant–Irwin–Latrobe area was served by a 339-mile interurban trolley system, the wide track gauge West Penn Railways. It operated until 1952. Before the better economy of the area plus improved roads allowed more ownership and use of automobiles, the run every hour 5 cents a ride bright orange West Penn trolleys provided reliable local transportation.

=== Transit center ===
The Fayette Area Coordinated Transportation transit center hub is located at the Connellsville Airport in Lemont Furnace, about halfway between Fayette's two largest urban centers, Connellsville and Uniontown.

=== Roads ===
The main route through Connellsville is U.S. Route 119, which links Connellsville with nearby cities Uniontown and Greensburg, and provides access to many of the business on the outskirts of the city. Pennsylvania Route 201 ends in Connellsville, and PA 711 serves as the main street through downtown before heading into the local mountains.

== Education ==
It is in the Connellsville Area School District.

== Notable people ==
- Bob Bailor, professional baseball player, minor league manager and major league coach
- Harold Betters, jazz trombonist
- Scott Blasey, lead vocalist for rock band the Clarks
- Jim Braxton, professional football player
- William A. Clark, copper baron, U.S. Senator of Montana
- James J. Davidson, politician and businessman
- Justin Deas, actor
- Gene Hasson, professional baseball player
- Denny Hickey, racing driver
- David R. Jones, journalist, winner of two Gerald Loeb Awards
- Johnny Lujack, Heisman-winning quarterback for Notre Dame and Chicago Bears
- Jerry McKenna, sculptor and author
- Herbert Morrison, radio reporter
- Edwin S. Porter, movie director
- Jim Rugg, comics creator
- Bo Scott, professional football player
- Bob Shrum, journalist
- Edgar Snyder, area attorney
- Adam W. Snyder, american politician
- John Woodruff, 1936 Olympic gold medalist in Men's 880-yard run; held in Berlin, Germany

== See also ==
- Carnegie Free Library (Connellsville, Pennsylvania)
- Colonial National Bank Building
- Connellsville Armory
- Connellsville train wreck
- Connellsville Union Passenger Depot
- Dr. J.C. McClenathan House and Office
- United States Post Office (Connellsville, Pennsylvania)
- Connellsville Area School District
