= Bibliography of Chester A. Arthur =

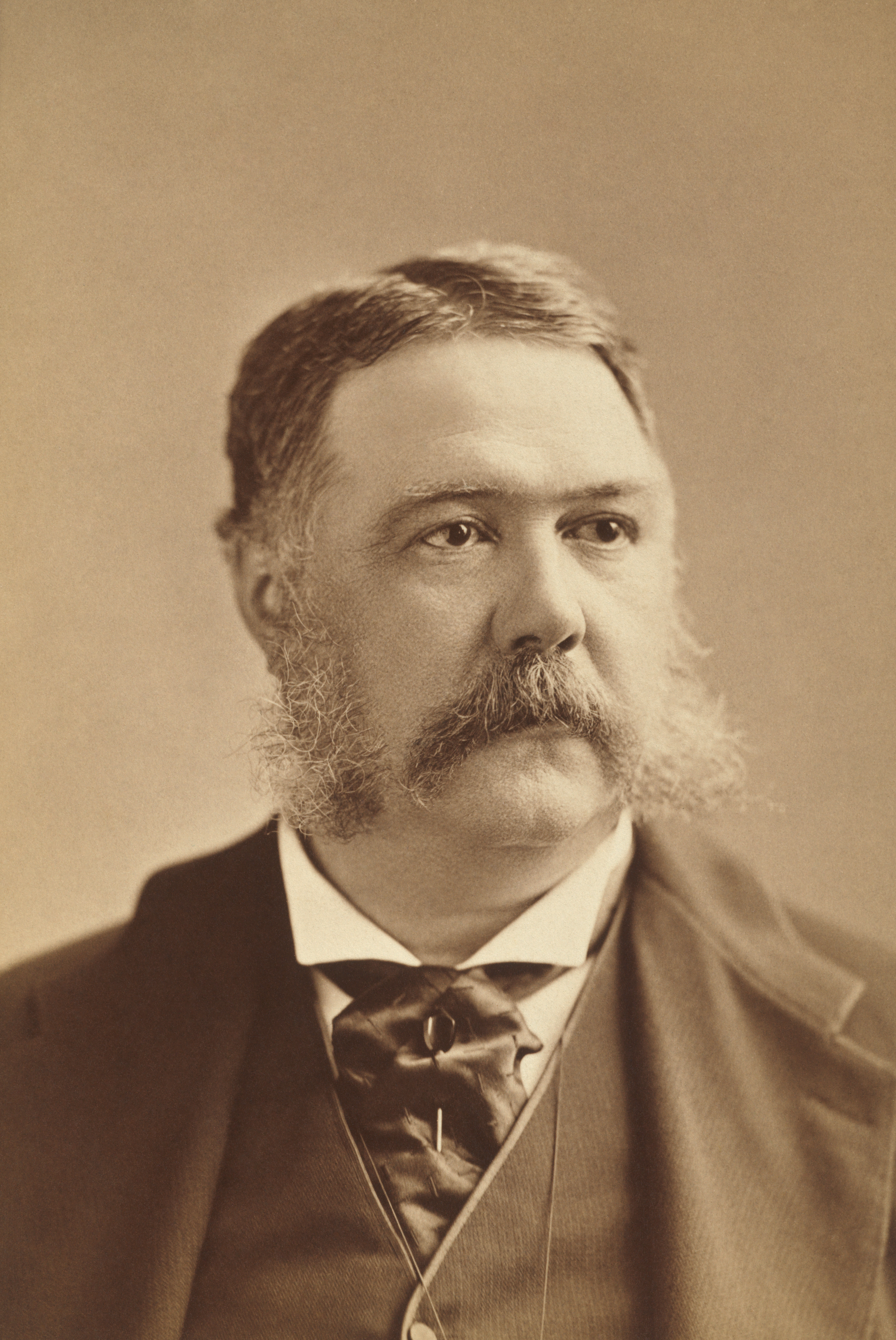
- Chester A. Arthur (1829–1886)
- Subject: Chester A. Arthur
- Scope: Books, journal articles, book chapters
- Period covered: October 5, 1829 – November 18, 1886
- Languages: English
- Part of bibliography series about: President of the United States
- Related bibliographies: Bibliography of the Reconstruction era; Bibliography of William McKinley; Bibliography of works on Ulysses S. Grant
- Related timelines: Timeline of the Chester A. Arthur presidency; Timeline of the James A. Garfield presidency
- Related outlines and indexes: List of bibliographies of presidents of the United States; List of presidents of the United States; Outline of the history of the United States

This is a select bibliography of academic level books and journal articles, published mainly after World War II about the life of Chester A. Arthur and the historical context of his life.

Chester Alan Arthur (October 5, 1829 – November 18, 1886) was the 21st president of the United States, serving from 1881 to 1885. A Republican from New York, he served as the 20th vice president under President James A. Garfield in 1881, assuming the presidency after Garfield's assassination. Arthur's administration saw Congress authorize the first steel-hulled warships of the modern U.S. Navy, the end of the so-called "spoils system", and the implementation of harsher restrictions for migrants entering from abroad.

Arthur's tenure as the 21st president of the United States began on September 20, 1881, when he succeeded to the presidency upon the assassination of President James A. Garfield, and ended on March 4, 1885. Arthur, a Republican, had been vice president for 200 days when he succeeded to the presidency. In ill health and lacking the full support of his party by the end of his term, Arthur made only a token effort for the Republican presidential nomination in the 1884 presidential election. He was succeeded by Democrat Grover Cleveland.

Bibliography contains academic level English language books (including translations) and journal articles, published mainly post World War II. (Note: Works published before World War II should be limited to areas where there are no significant post-World War II books on the subject or when the work in question has significant historical merit.) Book entries may have references to reviews published in academic journals or major newspapers when these could be considered helpful. These reference reviews also function as a resource to find other works on this subject.

Works listed here are cited in the notes or bibliographies of scholarly sources. Each is published by an academic or major trade press, written by a recognized expert, or substantially reviewed in scholarly journals; borderline cases are omitted. A selection of primary sources is included. Many of the books below carry their own bibliographies; see Further reading section for longer ones, and External links section for historical sites and museums.

Citations follow APA style. (Note: Entries are in plain text APA 7 format without templates; templates are used only for reviews and notes.) Books have citations to academic journal or mainstream published reviews when available. For books only partly about the subject, give relevant chapter or section titles where useful and available. Translators of the original-language edition are included when possible. In cases where a title or name has appeared with more than one English spelling, the most recent published form is used and a footnote documents any earlier title under which the work appeared.

== General biographies ==
- Greenberger, S. S. (2017). The unexpected president: The life and times of Chester A. Arthur. Da Capo Press.
- Howe, G. F. (1934). Chester A. Arthur: A quarter-century of machine politics. Dodd, Mead.
- Karabell, Z. (2004). Chester Alan Arthur. Times Books.
- Reeves, T. C. (1975). Gentleman Boss: The life of Chester Alan Arthur. Knopf.

== Life before the presidency and family ==
- Hewitt, J. H. (1990). The search for Elizabeth Jennings, heroine of a Sunday afternoon in New York City. New York History, 71(4), 386–415.
- Howe, G. F. (1931). The New York custom-house controversy, 1877–1879. The Mississippi Valley Historical Review, 18(3), 350–363. JSTOR 1891404
- Mikorenda, J. (2019). America's first freedom rider: Elizabeth Jennings, Chester A. Arthur, and the early fight for civil rights. Lyons Press.
- Reeves, T. C. (1970). The diaries of Malvina Arthur: Windows into the past of our 21st president. Vermont History, 38(3), 177–188.
- Reeves, T. C. (1970). The mystery of Chester Alan Arthur's birthplace. Vermont History, 38(4), 291–304.
- Rosenblatt, A. M. (2023). The eight: The Lemmon slave case and the fight for freedom. Excelsior Editions.

== Presidency ==
- Ackerman, K. D. (2003). Dark horse: The surprise election and political murder of President James A. Garfield. Carroll & Graf.
- Brandwein, P. (2007). A judicial abandonment of blacks? Rethinking the "state action" cases of the Waite Court. Law & Society Review, 41(2), 343–386.
- Brandwein, P. (2011). Rethinking the judicial settlement of Reconstruction. Cambridge University Press.
- Doenecke, J. D. (1981). The presidencies of James A. Garfield and Chester A. Arthur. Regents Press of Kansas.
- Fisher, P., & Fisher, S. (2001). Congressional passage of the Chinese exclusion act of 1882. Immigrants & Minorities, 20(2), 58–74. doi:10.1080/02619288.2001.9975015
- Gyory, A. (1998). Closing the gate: Race, politics, and the Chinese Exclusion Act. University of North Carolina Press.
- Herrick, W. R. (1966). The American naval revolution. Louisiana State University Press.
- Hoogenboom, A. (1959). The Pendleton Act and the civil service. The American Historical Review, 64(2), 301–318. doi:10.1086/ahr/64.2.301
- Hoogenboom, A. (1961). Outlawing the spoils: A history of the civil service reform movement, 1865–1883. University of Illinois Press.
- Horan, M. J. (1972). Political economy and sociological theory as influences upon judicial policy-making: The Civil Rights Cases of 1883. The American Journal of Legal History, 16(1), 71–86.
- Irwin, D. A. (1998). Higher tariffs, lower revenues? Analyzing the fiscal aspects of "The great tariff debate of 1888". The Journal of Economic History, 58(1), 59–72.
- Kocher, D. J. (1982). Temporary vilification: The Chicago press and Chester Arthur, 1881. Journalism History, 9(2), 53–60. doi:10.1080/00947679.1982.12067000
- Lee, E. (2002). The Chinese exclusion example: Race, immigration, and American gatekeeping, 1882–1924. Journal of American Ethnic History, 21(3), 36–62.
- Lee, E. (2003). At America's gates: Chinese immigration during the exclusion era, 1882–1943. University of North Carolina Press.
- McClain, C. J. (1994). In search of equality: The Chinese struggle against discrimination in nineteenth-century America. University of California Press.
- McConarty, C. (2022). Reconciling the New Navy: Hilary Abner Herbert and the end of Reconstruction in America. Journal of Southern History, 88(4), 649–680. doi:10.1353/soh.2022.0216
- Moreira, D., & Pérez, S. (2024). Civil service exams and organizational performance: Evidence from the Pendleton Act. American Economic Journal: Applied Economics, 16(3), 250–291. doi:10.1257/app.20220284
- Pegler-Gordon, A. (2006). Chinese exclusion, photography, and the development of U.S. immigration policy. American Quarterly, 58(1), 51–77.
- Peterson, W. S. (1988). Congressional politics: Building the New Navy, 1876–86. Armed Forces & Society, 14(4), 489–509.
- Phipps, K. E. (2009). Marriage and redemption: Mormon polygamy in the congressional imagination, 1862–1887. Virginia Law Review, 95(2), 435–487.
- Poll, R. D. (1986). The legislative antipolygamy campaign. Brigham Young University Studies, 26(4), 107–121.
- Ranney, J. A. (2024). "This law, though dead, did speak": The Civil Rights Cases and their unforeseen aftermath. Journal of Supreme Court History, 49(1), 8–25. doi:10.1353/sch.2024.a920391
- Reeves, T. C. (1969). Chester A. Arthur and campaign assessments in the election of 1880. The Historian, 31(4), 573–582. doi:10.1111/j.1540-6563.1969.tb00363.x
- Reeves, T. C. (1969). Chester A. Arthur and the campaign of 1880. Political Science Quarterly, 84(4), 628–637. JSTOR 2147128
- Reitano, J. (1994). The tariff question in the Gilded Age: The great debate of 1888. Pennsylvania State University Press.
- Rutherglen, G. (2009). Textual corruption in the Civil Rights Cases. Journal of Supreme Court History, 34(2), 164–169. doi:10.1353/sch.2009.0010
- Sageser, A. B. (1935). The first two decades of the Pendleton Act: A study of civil service reform. University of Nebraska.
- Salyer, L. E. (1995). Laws harsh as tigers: Chinese immigrants and the shaping of modern immigration law. University of North Carolina Press.
- Saxton, A. (1971). The indispensable enemy: Labor and the anti-Chinese movement in California. University of California Press.
- Shulman, M. R. (1995). Navalism and the emergence of American sea power, 1882–1893. Naval Institute Press.
- Summers, M. W. (2000). Rum, Romanism, and rebellion: The making of a president, 1884. University of North Carolina Press.
- Sutton, T. C. (2020). Chester A. Arthur. In K. Gormley (Ed.), The presidents and the Constitution, volume one: From the Founding Fathers to the Progressive Era (pp. 276–287). New York University Press.
- Theriault, S. M. (2003). Patronage, the Pendleton Act, and the power of the people. The Journal of Politics, 65(1), 50–68. doi:10.1111/1468-2508.t01-1-00003
- Van Riper, P. P. (1958). History of the United States civil service. Row, Peterson.
- White, L. D. (1958). The Republican era, 1869–1901: A study in administrative history. Macmillan.
- Wolters, T. S. (2011). Recapitalizing the fleet: A material analysis of late-nineteenth-century U.S. naval power. Technology and Culture, 52(1), 103–126.
- Zhu, L. (2013). The road to Chinese exclusion: The Denver riot, 1880 election, and rise of the West. University Press of Kansas.

== Life after the presidency ==
- Canter, D., Kutikov, A., & Uzzo, R. G. (2011). How Chester Alan Arthur 'brightened' from a political spoilsman to a civil service reformer. BJU International, 108(8), 1235–1237. doi:10.1111/j.1464-410x.2011.10620.x
- Pappas, T. (2017). Bright's disease, malaria, and machine politics: The story of the illness of President Chester A. Arthur. The Surgery Journal, 3(4), e181–e187. doi:10.1055/s-0037-1612632

== Background ==
- Abrams, H. L. (1999). Can the Twenty-Fifth Amendment deal with a disabled president? Preventing future White House cover-ups. Presidential Studies Quarterly, 29(1), 115–133.
- Broxmeyer, J. D. (2015). Roscoe Conkling's wartime cotton speculation. New York History, 96(2), 167–181. doi:10.1353/nyh.2015.0001
- Calhoun, C. W. (2010). From bloody shirt to full dinner pail: The transformation of politics and governance in the Gilded Age. Hill and Wang.
- Chidsey, D. B. (1935). The gentleman from New York: A life of Roscoe Conkling. Yale University Press.
- Crispell, K. R., & Gomez, C. F. (1988). Hidden illness in the White House. Duke University Press.
- Hoogenboom, A. (1995). Rutherford B. Hayes: Warrior and president. University Press of Kansas.
- Jordan, D. M. (1971). Roscoe Conkling of New York: Voice in the Senate. Cornell University Press.
- Marcus, R. D. (1971). Grand Old Party: Political structure in the Gilded Age, 1880–1896. Oxford University Press.
- Maslin-Wicks, K. (2007). Forsaking transformational leadership: Roscoe Conkling, the great Senator from New York. The Leadership Quarterly, 18(5), 463–476. doi:10.1016/j.leaqua.2007.07.003
- Millard, C. (2011). Destiny of the republic: A tale of madness, medicine and the murder of a president. Doubleday.
- Morgan, H. W. (1969). From Hayes to McKinley: National party politics, 1877–1896. Syracuse University Press.
- Peskin, A. (1978). Garfield: A biography. Kent State University Press.
- Peskin, A. (1984). Who were the Stalwarts? Who were their rivals? Republican factions in the Gilded Age. Political Science Quarterly, 99(4), 703–716.
- Prucha, F. P. (1986). The great father: The United States government and the American Indians (Abridged ed.). University of Nebraska Press.
- Skowronek, S. (1982). Building a new American state: The expansion of national administrative capacities, 1877–1920. Cambridge University Press.

== Historiography ==
- Calhoun, C. W. (2002). Reimagining the "lost men" of the Gilded Age: Perspectives on the late nineteenth century presidents. The Journal of the Gilded Age and Progressive Era, 1(3), 225–257. doi:10.1017/s1537781400000244

== Primary sources ==
- Conkling, A. R. (1889). The life and letters of Roscoe Conkling. C. L. Webster.
- Hayes, R. B. (1922). Diary and letters of Rutherford Birchard Hayes, nineteenth president of the United States. Ohio State Archaeological and Historical Society.

== See also ==
- 1880 United States presidential election
- Assassination of James A. Garfield – the event that elevated Arthur to the presidency
- Chester A. Arthur
- Chester Alan Arthur State Historic Site – Fairfield, Vermont
- Chinese Exclusion Act
- Civil Rights Cases – the 1883 decisions striking down the Civil Rights Act of 1875
- Nell Arthur – Arthur's wife, who died months before he became president
- Pendleton Civil Service Reform Act
- Presidency of Chester A. Arthur
- Roscoe Conkling – New York senator and Stalwart patron of Arthur's early career
- Star Route scandal – postal fraud prosecutions pursued during Arthur's term
- United States Custom House (New York City) – the collectorship Arthur held from 1871 to 1878
