= John Wesley Phillips =

American politician (1803–1867)

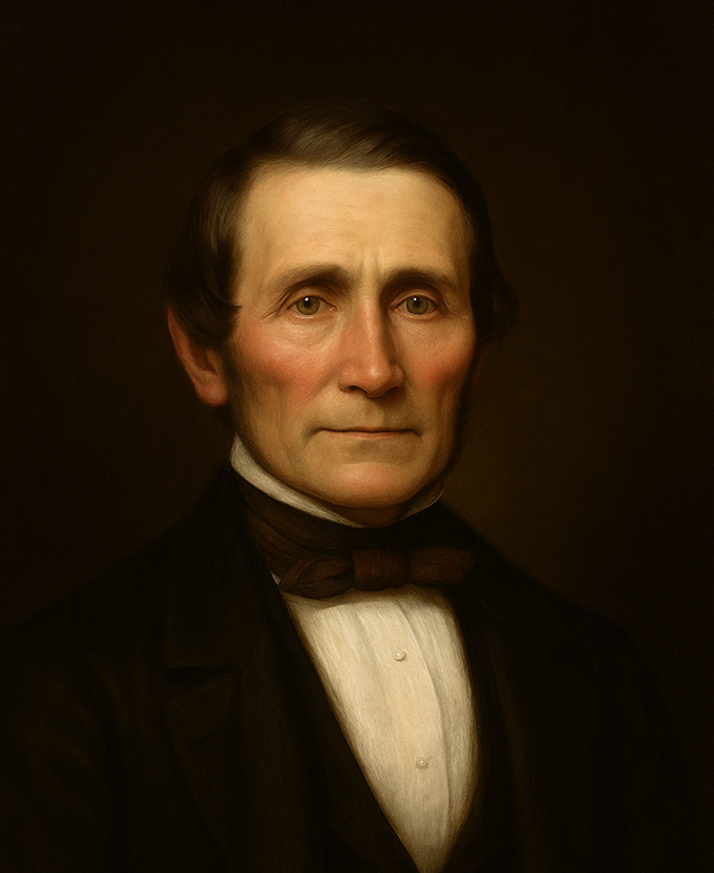
- Portrait c. 1840–1850

Councilman, Connellsville, Pennsylvania
- In office 1829–1837

Member of the Pennsylvania House of Representatives
- In office 1847–1851
- Preceded by: R. T. Galloway (Dem.) & Alexander M. Hill (Dem.)
- Succeeded by: William Redick (Dem.) and William Y. Roberts (Dem.)

Personal details
- Born: September 28, 1803 Titusvile, Mercer County, New Jersey, U.S.
- Died: April 30, 1867 (aged 63) Greenville Township, Illinois, U.S.
- Party: Whig
- Spouse: Margaret Rice Connell (1808–1895)
- Children: 11

John Wesley Phillips (1803–1867) was an American politician and Whig who represented Fayette County in the Pennsylvania House of Representatives in 1847 and previously served on the Connellsville, Pennsylvania borough council in 1829 and 1832.

== Early life ==
John Wesley Phillips was born at Titusvile, Mercer County, New Jersey on September 28, 1803 to Rev. John Phillips (b. April 19, 1775, d. May 11, 1849) and Mary "Polly" Addis (1778–1860) who married at Bucks County, Pennsylvania on May 5, 1797. His father, Rev. John Phillips, was a captain in the War of 1812 and a descendant of Edward Howell, Gent. and Thomas Halsey, early Puritan settlers of Lynn, Massachusetts (1633–1635) and co-founders of Southampton, New York (1640). John Wesley Phillips died in Greenville Township, Bond County, Illinois, on April 30, 1867, at the age of 64.

== Family ==
John Wesley Phillips married Margaret Rice Connell (1808–1895) on July 14, 1825. She was the daughter of Zachariah Connell, who was the founder of Connellsville, Pennsylvania. Together, they had eight sons and three daughters:

1. Charles William Phillips (1826–1910) m. Eliza Davidson Marshall
2. Zachariah Connell Phillips (1829–1906) m. Eliza Jones
3. Capt. John Howell Phillips (1831–1876) Captain Commanding Co. D, 22nd Illinois Infantry m. (1) Mary Virginia Buie (1833-1859) (2) Emilie Koester
4. Joseph Wesley Phillips (1834–1834)
5. Eliza Jane Phillips (1836–1922) m. Carey Allen Darlington, band musician in the 20th Illinois Infantry
6. Thomas Robison Phillips (1838–1866) band musician in the 20th Illinois Infantry, died from typhoid fever
7. Joseph Henry Phillips (1840–1862) killed in battle of Fort Donelson February 15, 1862
8. Capt. Fielding Davis Phillips (1843–1865) Captain Commanding Co. E, 130th Illinois Infantry; died from wounds as prisoner during the Red River Expedition
9. Margaret Alice Phillips (1846–1929) m. American attorney and Andersonville Prison (American Civil War) escapee Stephen French, Esq.
10. Wesley Hollingsworth Phillips (1848–1926) m. Minnie Laura Hover
11. Mary Ellen Phillips (1851–1928) m. Samuel Whitmore
