= Zachariah Connell =

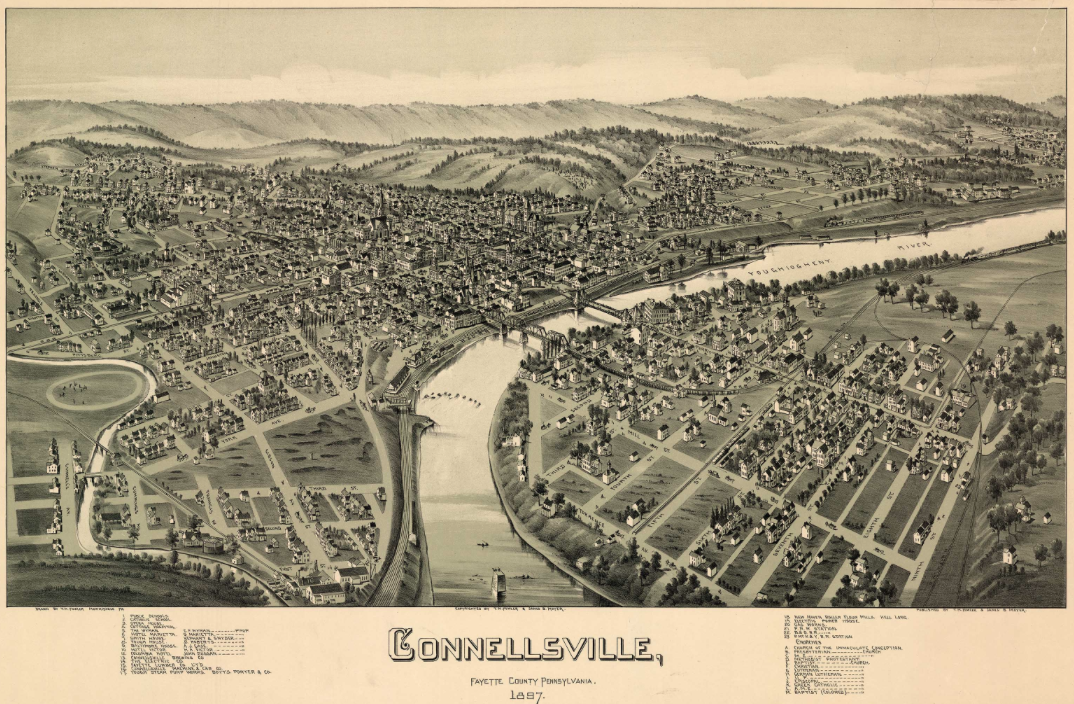
- Born: 1741; Winchester, Frederick County, Virginia
- Died: August 26, 1813 (aged 71–72); Connellsville, Pennsylvania
- Burial place: Connellsville, Pennsylvania
- Occupations: Surveyor, land speculator, businessman, philanthropist
- Known for: Founding of Connellsville, Pennsylvania
- Spouse(s): (1) Rebecca Rice (2) Margaret Wallace
- Children: Children with Rebecca Rice: Hiram; John Rice; Rebecca; Nancy; Mariah; Children with Margaret Wallace: Charles William; Zachariah Connell; John Howell; Joseph Wesley; Eliza Jane; Thomas Robison; Joseph Henry; Fielding Davis; Margaret Alice; Wesley Hollingsworth; Mary Ellen
- Parents: James Connell (father); Anne Williams (mother)

Signature
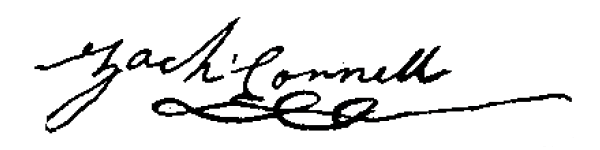

Zachariah Connell (1741–1813) was a Revolutionary War soldier and the founder of Connellsville, Pennsylvania, United States.

== Birth and early life ==
Born near Winchester, Frederick County, Virginia in 1741, the son of James Connell (son of Thomas Connell of St. Mary's County, Maryland and Mary Ogden) and Anne Williams. Zachariah's earliest "Connell" ancestor to settle in America was James O'Connell (d. 1700) who emigrated from Ireland in 1678 and settled in St. Mary's County, Maryland.

Growing-up in Frederick County, Zachariah's family was acquainted with the Washington's. In 1771, George Washington' brother, Samuel Washington, purchased 212 acres, near the "North Mountain" from Zachariah. Margaret Wallace, a Virginian and Zachariah's second wife, was also acquainted with the Washington family. During the American Revolution, Zachariah was appointed captain of the Yohogania County militia in 1776 and a member of the Virginia Court of Gentlemen Justices Yohogana, Co. (1776-1777). During the Revolution, he also served as associator, frontier ranger and soldier.

== Zachariah Connell: The Individual ==
No picture or silhouette of Zachariah exists. He was described as a typical Scotch Sandy with red hair, brown eyes and a florid complexion. He stood about five feet, nine inches tall, straight "as a popular, wrong and muscular and possess of a constitution that could endure the severest hardship." He was a man of considerable intellectual ability, "gifted with splendid business judgement, and enjoyed the confidence and esteem of all his fellow citizens." He was considered eccentric, primarily because he never registered to vote in the Borough. His refusal to vote, however, was not due to any lack of interest in politics or town affairs, but to his desire that the citizens of the town might feel free to govern themselves without interference or influence from himself. Zachariah refused to consume alcohol, even though it was freely imbibed by all classes of people (especially whiskey).

== Founding of Connellsville, Pennsylvania ==
It has been said that Zachariah first came to Fayette County in the fall of 1770, in company with George Washington and Dr. James Craik. In October 1770, during a stop-over at Captain William Crawford's cabin across the river from the present town cite, George Washington wrote: "We went to see a coal mine... on the bank of the Youghiogeny River. The coal seemed to be of the very best kind, burning freely, and an abundance of it." This area was known as the District of West Augusta and was claimed by both Virginia and Pennsylvania. It is probable that Zachariah's former acquaintance with the Crawfords of Virginia and George Washington directed him toward the area that would become his eponymous township. Zachariah was a surveyor and a man of wide influence amount the early settlers of this region. Under his superintendence, many of the original surveys for the surrounding country were made.

The Connell family was credited with 2,569.5 acres: three farms containing 964.25 acres are credited to Zachariah Connell and two farms consisting of 819 acres were credited to his two sons. These lands didn't include several other valuable tract that were purchased by Zachariah at a later date. A town of 180 quarter-acre lots was surveyed, and a charter for a township secured for the same bearing date of March 21, 1793. This charter, recorded in Deed Book C of the Fayette County records, can be found here (p. 51). Connellsville was then incorporated as a "borough" on 1 March 1806. Due to the city’s location in the center of the Connellsville coalfield, which was during the early coal mining years, Connellsville had more millionaires per capita than any other place in the country, and possibly the world.

Zachariah was not only interested in the care of his own land, but also in looking after the estates of others. He served as the local land agent for Governor Dinwiddie of Virginia, Howards of Maryland, and the Chew family of Germantown, Pennsylvania.

The later years of Zachariah Connell's life were devoted to the care of his real estate. He became an ardent Methodist, and donated the lot on which the church of that denomination was built. He also donated land for the site of the old Market House, the spacious grounds of the City Hall, the High School and the Carnegie Library.

== Family ==
Zachariah Connell married (1st) Rebecca Rice, b. Virginia in 1741, d. Connellsville, October, 1805, with whom he had two sons and three daughters:

1. Hiram
2. John Rice
3. Rebeca m. Greeberry R. Jones
4. Hettie m. Samuel Black
5. Nancy m. Joseph Hollingsworth
6. Mariah m. William Page

Zachariah married (2nd) Margaret Wallace (the Wallace family were Virginians and well-acquainted with the Washington family) m. 10 May 1807, d. Connellsville, 20 Jun 1845, with whom he had two daughters:

1. Eliza m. Daniel Howell Phillips
2. Margaret Rice, b. Connellsville, PA 18 Aug 1808, m. 14 July 1825 Rep. John Wesley Phillips, a member of the Pennsylvania House of Representatives from 1847 to 1851 who also served on the Connellsville, Pennsylvania borough council in 1829 and 1832. John Wesley Phillips was the son of Capt. John Phillips of Uniontown, Pennsylvania, captain in the War of 1812 and descendant of Edward Howell, Lord of Westbury and Thomas Halsey, two of the earliest settlers of Lynn, Massachusetts (1633-1635) and a founders of Southampton, New York (1640). John Wesley Phillips and Margaret Rice (Connell) Phillips had eight sons and three daughters:
  1. Charles William Phillips (1826–1910) m. Eliza Davidson Marshall
  2. Zachariah Connell Phillips (1829–1906) m. Eliza Jones
  3. John Howell Phillips (1831–1876) m. (1) Mary Virginia Buie (2) Emilie Koester
  4. Joseph Wesley Phillips (1834–1834)
  5. Eliza Jane Phillips (1836–1922) m. Carey Allen Darlington
  6. Thomas Robison Phillips (1838–1866); died from typhoid fever as soldier in Civil War
  7. Joseph Henry Phillips (1840–1862); killed in battle of Fort Donelson February 15, 1862
  8. Fielding Davis Phillips (1843–1865); died from wounds as prisoner during the Red River Expedition
  9. Margaret Alice Phillips (1846–1929) m. American attorney and Andersonville Prison (American Civil War) escapee Stephen French, Esq.
  10. Wesley Hollingsworth Phillips (1848–1926) m. Minnie Laura Hover
  11. Mary Ellen Phillips (1851–1928) m. Samuel Whitmore

== Death and burial ==
Zachariah Connell died in his Water Street home 26 Aug 1813 and is buried on a hill overlooking Connellsville. His last Will and Testament, made a few weeks before his death, is given herewith:

In the name of Almighty God, Amen. I, Zachariah Connell, of the town of Connellsville, being deeply impressed with the uncertainty of life, have made this my last Will and Testament. I give to my wife, Peggy, the new house that I am now building (which is to be finished out of my money) to live in during her widowhood, and one third part of my estate during her natural life; after her disease to be divided equally between my two youngest daughters, Peggy and Eliza. I give to my daughter, Hetty Black, five hundred dollars, to be deposited in the hands of my executors, to be appropriated to her personal benefit that way which they in their judgement shall think most proper. I give to my four grandsons, Zachariah, Samuel, William and John Black all that tract of land lying situate in Ohio State, whereon my daughter Hetty Black now lives, to be equally divided among them. I give to my son John Connell the debt with he now owes me on a book account. I wish all my debts to be punctually paid. After my debts and the above legacies are paid, my desire is that the balance of my estate, whatever it may be, should be equally divided between my other six children (leaving out John and Hetty) one sixth part to each. And I appoint my son, Hiram Connell, William Page and Greenbury R. Jones, executors of this, my last Will and Testament. And I do hereby revoke and cancel all Wills by me heretofore made, and do by these presents acknowledge this my last Will and Testament. Signed this 2nd day of August in the year of our Lord eighteen hundred and thirteen. (Seal.) ZACHARIAH CONNELL

Many of his descendants moved west, but there are still Connells in Connellsville.
