= Chester A. Arthur Home =

Historic house in Manhattan, New York

- Chester A. Arthur House
- U.S. National Register of Historic Places
- U.S. National Historic Landmark
- New York State Register of Historic Places
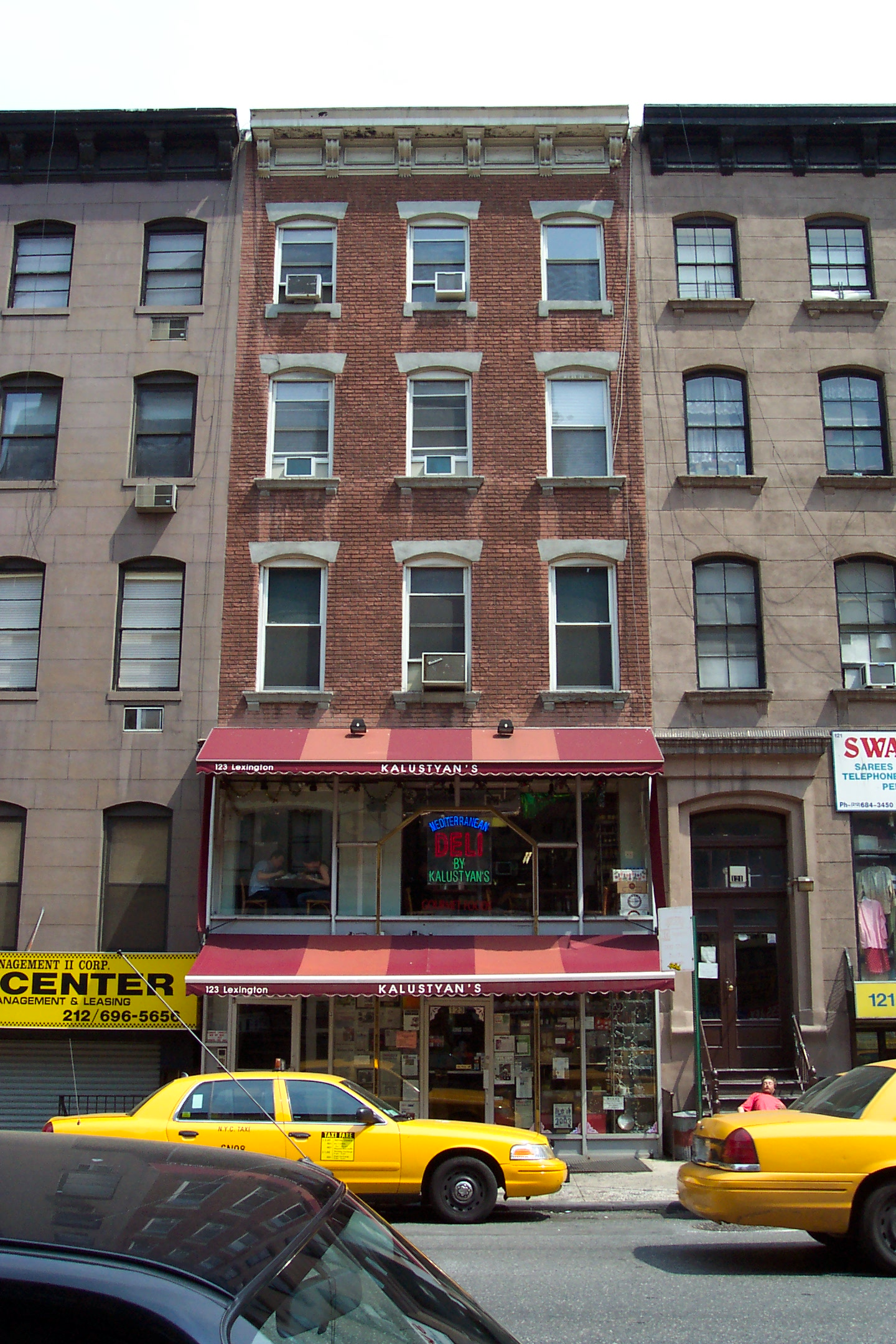
- The Residence of Chester A. Arthur, 2007

- Location within Manhattan Location within New York Location within the United States
- Location: 123 Lexington Avenue, Manhattan, New York City, New York
- Coordinates: 40°44′34″N 73°58′55″W
- Area: less than one acre
- Architectural style: Renaissance
- NRHP reference No.: 66000534
- NYSRHP No.: 06101.001671

Significant dates
- Added to NRHP: October 15, 1966
- Designated NHL: December 12, 1965
- Designated NYSRHP: June 23, 1980

The Chester A. Arthur Home was the residence of the 21st president of the United States, Chester A. Arthur (1829–1886), both before and after his four years in Washington, D.C., while serving as vice president and then as president. It is located at 123 Lexington Avenue, between 28th and 29th Streets in Rose Hill, Manhattan, New York City. Arthur spent most of his adult life living in the residence. While Vice President, Arthur retreated to the house after the July 2, 1881 shooting of President James Garfield. Arthur was in residence here when Garfield died on September 19, and took the presidential oath of office in the building. A commemorative bronze plaque was placed inside the building in 1964 by the Native New Yorkers Historical Society and New York Life Insurance, and the house was designated a National Historic Landmark on January 12, 1965.

== Site ==
The Chester A. Arthur Home is located at 123 Lexington Avenue, in the Murray Hill or Rose Hill neighborhood of Midtown Manhattan in New York City. It sits between 29th Street to the north and 28th Street to the south, facing Lexington Avenue to the west from a frontage of 21.83 feet (6.65 m). The building site covers a lot area of 1,747 square feet (162.3 m^{2}), with a depth of 80 feet (24 m) between Lexington Avenue and Third Avenue. Nearby landmarks include the Madison Avenue Baptist Church and New York School of Applied Design for Women to the north, the Church of Our Lady of the Scapular–St. Stephen to the east, the William and Anita Newman Library and 69th Regiment Armory to the south, and the Emmet Building to the west.

== Description and history ==
The Chester A. Arthur Home is a five-story masonry structure with Romanesque Revival styling. It is three bays wide, and has an elaborate cornice, which obscures its low-pitch or flat roof. Windows on the upper three floors are set in segmented arch openings, with splayed stone lintels and bracketed sills. The lower two floors have been converted into a retail space, with a modernized storefront, and the upper floors have been converted to apartments. The interior of the house has relatively little historic integrity.

Chester Alan Arthur moved to New York City in 1848, where he engaged in the practice of law, and in Republican Party politics. He rose in the city's Republican machine to become Collector of the Port of New York, a major patronage post. He was chosen to be James Garfield's running mate in the 1880 election, and became president after Garfield died on September 19, 1881, from wounds incurred in an assassination attempt eleven weeks earlier. Arthur took the oath of office in this house, and retired to it after his term ended in 1885. He died here the following year.

The house was later purchased by William Randolph Hearst. It has since undergone many changes. Today, the building houses Kalustyan's, an Indian and Middle Eastern grocery store, on the first two floors, and apartments on the top three.

== Gallery ==
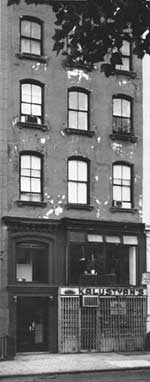
The Residence of Chester A. Arthur, 1976

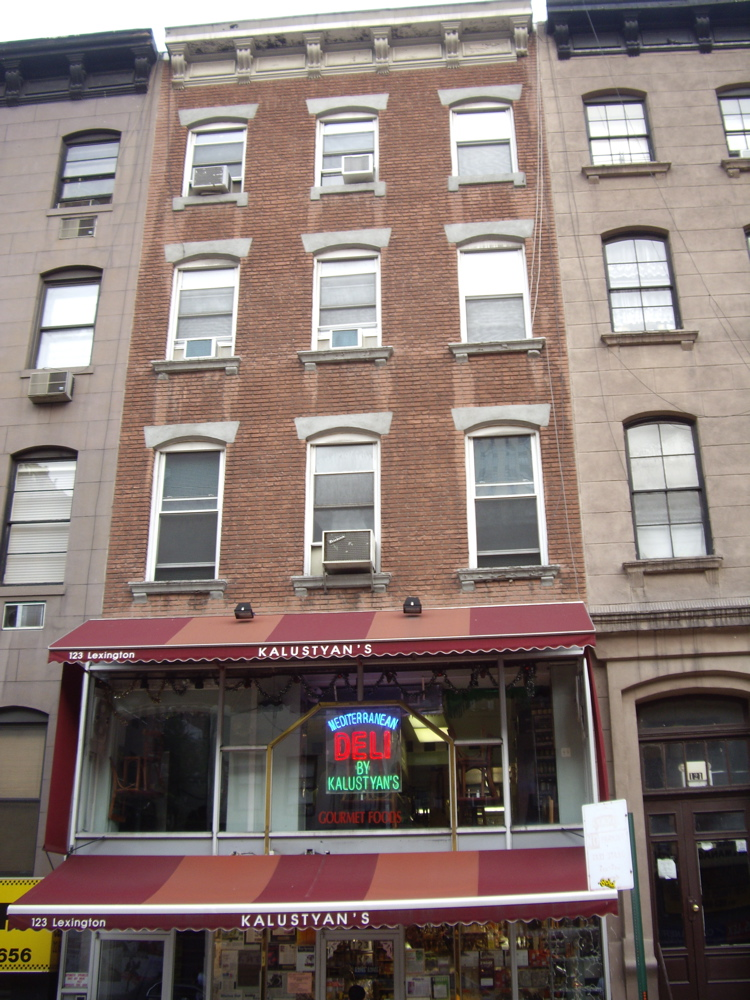
A closer view of Chester A. Arthur House, 2007

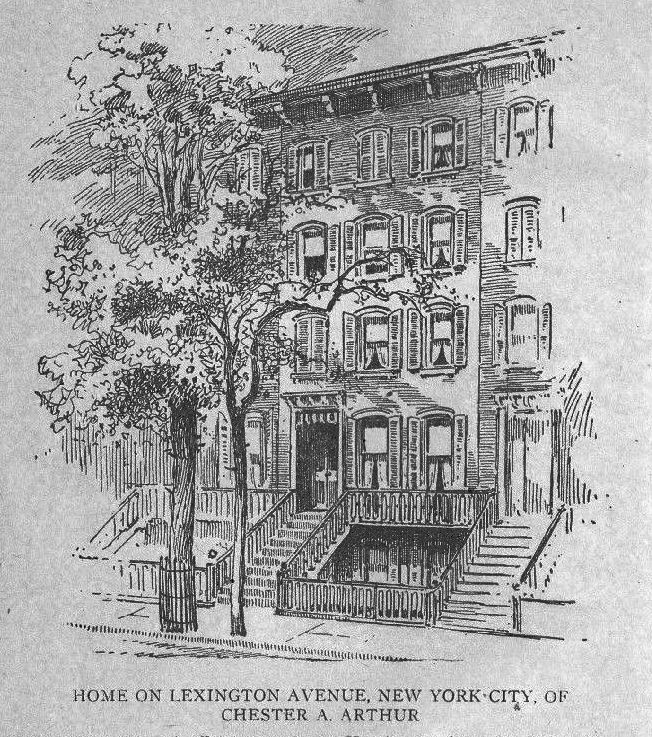
123 Lexington Avenue during Chester Arthur's days

== See also ==
- Chester Alan Arthur State Historic Site, replica of Arthur's birth site in Vermont
- List of residences of presidents of the United States
- List of National Historic Landmarks in New York City
- National Register of Historic Places listings in Manhattan from 14th to 59th Streets
- Federal Hall, site of George Washington's inauguration in New York City.
