= Timeline of the James A. Garfield presidency =

James A. Garfield

The presidency of James A. Garfield began on March 4, 1881, when James A. Garfield was inaugurated as the twentieth president of the United States and ended with his death on September 19, 1881.

== 1881 ==
=== March 1881 ===
- March 4 – James A. Garfield is inaugurated as the twentieth president of the United States. During his inaugural speech, he expresses support for universal education, the gold and silver standards, and equal rights for black Americans. Chester A. Arthur becomes vice president of the United States.
- March 5 – James G. Blaine becomes secretary of state, William Windom becomes secretary of the treasury, Robert Todd Lincoln becomes secretary of war, Wayne MacVeagh becomes attorney general, Thomas Lemuel James becomes postmaster general, William H. Hunt becomes secretary of the navy, and Samuel J. Kirkwood becomes secretary of the interior. Senator Roscoe Conkling is upset because he was not consulted on nominations despite a previous agreement between him and Garfield.
- March 9 – Garfield nominates LeBaron B. Colt to the District Court for the District of Rhode Island.
- March 14 – Garfield nominates Stanley Matthews to the Supreme Court. He nominates Don Albert Pardee to the U.S. Circuit Court for the Fifth Circuit.
- March 18 – Vice President Chester A. Arthur casts two tie-breaking votes in the Senate during the selection process for committees and chairs.
- March 21 – LeBaron Bradford Colt is confirmed to the District Court for the District of Rhode Island.
- March 23
  - Garfield dismisses Edwin Atkins Merritt as Collector of the Port of New York and nominates William H. Robertson as a replacement. Senator Roscoe Conkling was against changes to the New York Customhouse, and this causes further animosity between Garfield and Conkling. Senator William Mahone, who broke with his Democratic Party when voting on Senate committees, also supports some of Garfield's nominations which are opposed by Democrats. Democratic senators begin a filibuster that will last until May to limit Garfield's powers of appointment.
  - Garfield nominates Samuel F. Phillips to the U.S. Court of Claims.

=== April 1881 ===
- April 13 – Garfield fires the second assistant postmaster general for involvement in the Star Route scandal and asks Postmaster General Thomas James to investigate further.
- April 24 – Garfield tells The Philadelphia Press that his nomination of William H. Robertson as Collector of the Port of New York is not politically motivated.

=== May 1881 ===
- May 4 – The Democratic filibuster in the Senate ends.
- May 5 – Garfield retracts all of his nominations except for William H. Robertson as Collector of the Port of New York, ensuring that Conkling cannot delay a vote on Robertson. Garfield sees Robertson's confirmation as an assertion of executive authority.
- May 12 – Stanley Matthews is confirmed to the Supreme Court.
- May 13
  - Don Albert Pardee is confirmed to the U.S. Circuit Court for the Fifth Circuit.
  - The United States signs a treaty of peace, friendship, and commerce with Madagascar.
- May 16 – Both of the United States Senators from New York, Roscoe Conkling and Thomas C. Platt, resign in protest of Garfield's push for William H. Robertson to become Collector of the Port of New York. Both will unsuccessfully try to regain their seats in the special election to fill the vacancies.
- May 18
  - William H. Robertson becomes the Collector of the Port of New York.
  - Garfield nominates Alexander Boarman to the District Court for the Western District of Louisiana. Boarman is confirmed the same day.
- May 19 – Garfield withdraws his nomination of Samuel F. Philips to the U.S. Court of Claims. He then nominates Glenni W. Scofield.
- May 20 – Glenni W. Scofield is confirmed to the United States Court of Claims.
- May 21 – The American Red Cross is founded by Clara Barton in Washington, D.C. Garfield endorses the group.

=== June 1881 ===
- June 2 – Garfield appoints Addison Brown to the District Court for the Southern District of New York as a recess appointment.
- June 17 – The United States signs a treaty of rights, privileges, and immunities of consular officers with Romania.

=== July 1881 ===
- July 2 – Garfield is shot by attorney Charles J. Guiteau. Guiteau was upset because he was denied a consular position in the administration, and he wished to replace Garfield with Vice President Chester A. Arthur of the Republican Party's Stalwarts.
- July 4 – The Normal School for Colored Teachers, later Tuskegee University, is founded in Tuskegee, Alabama, with Booker T. Washington as its first president.

=== September 1881 ===
- September 19 – Garfield dies of blood poisoning as a result of his gunshot wound and the subsequent medical procedures. Chester A. Arthur becomes the twenty-first president of the United States.

== Works cited ==
- Bevans, Charles I. (1968). Treaties and Other International Agreements of the United States of America, 1776-1949. United States Department of State.
