= Timeline of the Chester A. Arthur presidency =

The presidency of Chester A. Arthur began on September 19, 1881, when Chester A. Arthur became the twenty-first president of the United States upon the assassination of James A. Garfield, and ended on March 4, 1885, at the end of Garfield's term.

== 1881 ==
=== September 1881 ===
- September 19 – Chester A. Arthur becomes the twenty-first president of the United States when James A. Garfield dies. Garfield had been shot and died from complications resulting from the treatment.
- September 20 – James A. Garfield's death is announced and Arthur assumes the powers of the presidency.
- September 22
  - Arthur is inaugurated as president of the United States. He speaks in praise of peaceful presidential succession.
  - Arthur issues a proclamation for a day of mourning following James A. Garfield's death.

=== October 1881 ===
- October 14 – The United States signs a treaty of commercial relations and a treaty of rights, privileges, and immunities of consular officers with the Principality of Serbia.
- October 19 – Arthur speaks at the Yorktown Centennial Celebration. He issues an executive order that the hundredth anniversary of the British surrender at Yorktown will be commemorated by having the United States military salute the British flag.
- October 27 – Charles J. Folger succeeds William Windom as secretary of the treasury.

=== November 1881 ===
- November 14
  - Charles J. Guiteau goes to trial for the assassination of James A. Garfield.
  - Wayne MacVeagh ends his tenure as attorney general.
- November 29 – The United States invites nations of South America to a Pan-American Conference. The conference is Secretary of State James G. Blaine's idea, and Arthur does not strongly support it.

=== December 1881 ===
- December 5 – The 47th United States Congress convenes for its first session.
- December 6 – Arthur delivers the 1881 State of the Union Address. He expresses support for funding education and Indian Schools.
- December 8 – Arthur moves into the White House.
- December 12 – Frederick T. Frelinghuysen succeeds James G. Blaine as secretary of state. Blaine resigned after his political beliefs came into conflict with Arthur's.
- December 19
  - Arthur nominates Horace Gray to the Supreme Court.
  - Benjamin H. Brewster becomes attorney general, filling the vacancy left by Wayne McVeagh.
- December 20
  - Horace Gray is confirmed to the Supreme Court.
  - Timothy O. Howe succeeds Thomas Lemuel James as postmaster general.

== 1882 ==
=== January 1882 ===
- January 25 – Charles J. Guiteau is convicted of the assassination of James A. Garfield.

=== February 1882 ===
- February 24 – Arthur nominates Roscoe Conkling to the Supreme Court.
- February 25 – The Apportionment Act of 1882 expands the House of Representatives to 325 seats.

=== March 1882 ===
- March 1 – The United States signs the Geneva Convention of 1864 of 1864.
- March 2 – Roscoe Conkling is confirmed to the Supreme Court, but he declines.
- March 4 – Nine people are indicted in the Star Route scandal.
- March 13 – Arthur nominates Samuel Blatchford to the Supreme Court.
- March 16 – The Senate ratifies the Geneva Convention of 1864. It also prohibits anyone practicing polygamy from voting or holding office, and it creates a commission to oversee voting in Utah Territory.
- March 22
  - Samuel Blatchford is confirmed to the Supreme Court.
  - The Edmunds Act makes it a felony to practice polygamy.

=== April 1882 ===
- April 4 – Arthur vetoes the Chinese Exclusion Act. It would have banned Chinese workers from immigrating to the United States for 20 years and prohibits Chinese residents from becoming citizens. He opposes such a long duration for the ban.
- April 6
  - Henry M. Teller succeeds Samuel J. Kirkwood as secretary of the interior.
  - William James Wallace is confirmed to the U.S. Circuit Court for the Second Circuit.
- April 12 – William E. Chandler succeeds William H. Hunt as secretary of the navy.
- April 18 – Arthur asks Congress to give its opinion on holding a Pan-American Conference.

=== May 1882 ===
- May 3 – Arthur issues a proclamation regarding the use of soldiers to combat raids from gangs and Chiricahua people.
- May 6 – A new Chinese Exclusion Act bans Chinese workers from immigrating to the United States for 10 years and prohibits Chinese residents from becoming citizens.
- May 15 – A tariff commission is established to advise tariff policy.
- May 22 – The United States recognizes Joseon Korea as a sovereign nation. They sign a treaty of peace, amity, commerce, and navigation.

=== June 1882 ===
- June 1
  - The trial for the Star Route scandal begins.
  - The United States signs a trademarks treaty with the Kingdom of Italy.
- June 13
  - The United States signs an extradition treaty with Belgium.
  - The United States signs a trademarks treaty with Spain.
- June 30 – Charles J. Guiteau is hanged for the assassination of James A. Garfield.

=== July 1882 ===
- July 1 – Arthur vetoes the Passenger Act of 1882, which would establish regulations for steamboats. He says it contains technical errors.
- July 2 – Congress overrides Arthur's veto of the Passenger Act of 1882.
- July 29 – The United States–Mexico Convention of 1882 authorizes a survey to define the Mexico–United States border.

=== August 1882 ===
- August 1 – Arthur vetoes the Rivers and Harbors Act of 1882. He accuses it of providing pork barrel benefits to individual areas.
- August 2 – Congress overrides Arthur's veto of the Rivers and Harbors Act of 1882.
- August 7 – The United States signs an extradition treaty with Spain.
- August 8 – The 47th United States Congress adjourns from its first session.

=== September 1882 ===
- September 11 – The trial of the Star Route scandal ends with two people found guilty and seven found not guilty. The jury foreman alleges that a government agent offered him a bribe, so the judge calls for a retrial on December 7.
- September 21 – The United States signs a treaty with Mexico on the right to pursue Indians across boundary line.

=== November 1882 ===
- November 7 – The 1882 United States elections take place. The Republican Party takes control of the Senate and the Democratic Party takes control of the House of Representatives.

=== December 1882 ===
- December 4
  - The 47th United States Congress convenes for its second session.
  - Arthur delivers the 1882 State of the Union Address. He expresses support for civil service reform because of its popularity, although he personally opposes it.
  - The tariff commission submits its report to Congress.
- December 7 – A retrial for the Star Route scandal begins.
- December 20 – Bancroft Davis is confirmed to the U.S. Court of Claims.

== 1883 ==
=== January 1883 ===
- January 16 – The Pendleton Civil Service Reform Act creates regulations for appointing civil service officials based on merit. It also establishes a committee of three people to head the United States Civil Service Commission.
- January 20 – The United States signs a commerce treaty with Mexico.
- January 22 – The Supreme Court issues its decision in United States v. Harris. It rules that the Fourteenth Amendment cannot restrict the acts of individuals and that the Tenth Amendment grants the states jurisdiction over penalizing violent crimes.

=== February 1883 ===
- February 10 – The United States signs a trademarks treaty with the Netherlands.

=== March 1883 ===
- March 3
  - The Tariff of 1883, known as the Mongrel Tariff, implements reductions of up to 2 percent on duties on imported goods. Arthur had called for reductions between 20 and 25 percent.
  - Pension benefits are increased for the physically disabled.
  - Funding is allocated for the navy to begin producing steel ships.
  - The 47th United States Congress adjourns from its second session.
- March 20 – The United States signs the Paris Convention for the Protection of Industrial Property with European and Central American countries.
- March 25 – Postmaster General Timothy O. Howe dies.

=== April 1883 ===
- April 3 – Walter Q. Gresham becomes postmaster general, filling the vacancy left by Timothy O. Howe.
- April 27 – The United States signs a trademarks treaty with Switzerland.

=== May 1883 ===
- May 24 – The Brooklyn Bridge opens with Arthur in attendance.

=== June 1883 ===
- June 14 – The retrial for the Star Route scandal ends. All twelve defendants are found not guilty.
- June 25 – Arthur issues an executive order reducing the number of internal revenue collection districts.

=== September 1883 ===
- September 18 – Ambassadors from Korea are received by Arthur in New York.
- September 25 – Walter Q. Gresham ends his tenure as postmaster general.

=== October 1883 ===
- October 14 – Frank Hatton becomes postmaster general, filling the vacancy left by Walter Q. Gresham.
- October 15 – The Supreme Court issues its decision in the Civil Rights Cases. It rules that legislation cannot regulate private discrimination.
- October 29 – The United States signs an extradition treaty with Luxembourg.

=== November 1883 ===
- November 24 – Arthur appoints Lawrence Weldon to the U.S. Court of Claims as a recess appointment.

=== December 1883 ===
- December 3 – The 48th United States Congress convenes for its first session.
- December 4 – Arthur delivers the 1883 State of the Union Address.
- December 5 – Arthur issues an executive order setting regulations for civil service applicants.
- December 18 – Arthur's recess appointment Lawrence Weldon is confirmed to his seat on the U.S. Court of Claims.
- December 21 – Arthur issues a proclamation to honor the hundredth anniversary of George Washington resigning his commission as commander-in-chief of the Continental Army.

== 1884 ==
=== January 1884 ===
- January 2 – The United States and Spain reach trade agreements with respect to Cuba and Puerto Rico.
- January 8 – Arthur asks Congress to fund improvement on the Mississippi River.

=== February 1884 ===
- February 13 – The United States and Spain reach trade agreements with respect to Cuba and Puerto Rico.

=== March 1884 ===
- March 13 – Standard time is established in Washington, D.C.
- March 14 – The United States signs an international convention on the protection of submarine cables.
- March 26 – Arthur requests funds for naval reconstruction.
- March 31 – David J. Brewer is confirmed to the U.S. Circuit Court for the Eighth Circuit.

=== April 1884 ===
- April 7 – The United States signs a trademarks treaty with Belgium.
- April 11 – Arthur asks Congress to allocate $1.5 for the armament of fortifications.
- April 22 – The United States recognizes the flag of the Congo Free State.

=== May 1884 ===
- May 13 – The Ironclad Oath, a requirement of officeholders to declare that they never rebelled against the United States, is abolished.
- May 14 – The United States signs a treaty of traffic in spiritous liquors with Siam.
- May 17 – The District of Alaska is established with a civil government from territory acquired in the Alaska Purchase.

=== June 1884 ===
- June 6
  - The 1884 Republican National Convention selects former secretary of state James G. Blaine as the Republican Party's nominee for president, with Senator John A. Logan as his running mate. This is the last time an incumbent president seeks his party's nomination at a convention and is rejected.
  - The United States joins the Moorsom System of measuring ships.
- June 11 – The United States signs an extradition treaty with Italy.
- June 27 – The Bureau of Labor, a predecessor of the Department of Labor, is established within the Department of the Interior.

=== July 1884 ===
- July 1 – Arthur issues a proclamation condemning the settlement of Oklahoma.
- July 2 – Arthur vetoes the Relief of Fitz John Porter Bill. He says it is overreach of the legislative branch.
- July 4 – The Statue of Liberty debuts in Paris before it is transported to the United States as a gift from France.
- July 5 – LeBaron B. Colt is confirmed to the U.S. Circuit Court for the First Circuit.
- July 7
  - The Central and South American Commission is established.
  - The 48th United States Congress adjourns from its first session.
- July 11 – The 1884 Democratic National Convention selects Governor Grover Cleveland as the Democratic Party's nominee for president, with former governor Thomas A. Hendricks as his running mate.

=== September 1884 ===
- September 4 – Secretary of the Treasury Charles J. Folger dies.
- September 24 – Walter Q. Gresham becomes secretary of the treasury, filling the vacancy left by Charles J. Folger.

=== October 1884 ===
- October 28
  - Hugh McCulloch succeeds Walter Q. Gresham as secretary of the treasury.
  - Arthur appoints Walter Q. Gresham to the U.S. Circuit Court for the Seventh Circuit as a recess appointment.

=== November 1884 ===
- November 4 – The 1884 United States elections take place. Grover Cleveland wins the 1884 presidential election.
- November 12 – Mexico and the United States agree to boundaries along the Rio Grande and Rio Colorado.
- November 16 – The United States signs a treaty of commercial and customs relations with Egypt.

=== December 1884 ===
- December 1
  - The 48th United States Congress convenes for its second session.
  - Arthur delivers the 1884 State of the Union Address.
- December 6 – The United States signs a treaty of commercial reciprocity with Hawaii.
- December 9 – Arthur's recess appointment Walter Q. Gresham is confirmed to his seat on the U.S. Circuit Court for the Seventh Circuit.

== 1885 ==
=== January 1885 ===
- January 20 – John Davis and William Adams Richardson are confirmed to the U.S. Court of Claims.
- January 31 – Arthur announces that the 1871 Treaty of Washington with the United Kingdom is nearing its expiration. He asks Congress to create a commission responsible for national fishing rights.

=== February 1885 ===
- February 21 – The Washington Monument is dedicated with Arthur in attendance.
- February 25
  - Occupying public lands is prohibited.
  - The United States signs a treaty of commerce with Mexico.
- February 26 – The Alien Contract Labor Law bans non-citizens from engaging in contract labor.

=== March 1885 ===
- March 3
  - Arthur is authorized to select one person to be general on the retired-list of the Army with the corresponding pay. He names former president and retired general Ulysses S. Grant.
  - The 48th United States Congress adjourns from its second session.
- March 4 – Arthur's presidency ends and Grover Cleveland is inaugurated as the twenty-second president of the United States.

== Works cited ==
- Bevans, Charles I. (1968). Treaties and Other International Agreements of the United States of America, 1776-1949. United States Department of State.
