= Westbury Manor Museum =

Coordinates: 50.852°N 1.180°W

General information
- Type: Museum
- Location: Fareham, Hampshire, England, West Street, Fareham, England
- Owner: Fareham Borough Council

Westbury Manor Museum was the main town centre museum located at 84 West Street, Fareham, Hampshire, England. It featured a variety of exhibits on local history, such as the use of Fareham red bricks in the construction of the Royal Albert Hall. It also had a small café and gift shop.

The museum was housed in an 18th-century Grade II* listed building with formal Victorian style gardens to the rear, formerly used as the offices of Fareham Urban District from 1934 to 1976. Westbury Manor Museum opened in 1990.

In 2014 management of the museum was transferred to Hampshire Cultural Trust as part of a larger transfer of museums from Hampshire County Council and Winchester City Council. The museum closed to the public on 31 December 2024.

The permanent closure of the museum on December 31, 2024, prompted local community reflections, including a commemorative poem by former volunteer Matt Earwaker published in the Gosport and Fareham Globe, which highlighted local grief over the building's transition away from a dedicated museum space.

From January 2025, a cafe opened up in the former museum space, providing a space for the local community to meet once again.
