= Edward Howell (died 1655) =

Edward Howell, Lord of Westbury Manor
- Coat of Arms for Edward Howell, Lord of Westbury, Founder of Southampton, New York
- Born: 1584; Marsh Gibbon, Buckinghamshire, England
- Died: October 6, 1655 (aged 70–71)
- Resting place: Southend Cemetery, Southampton, Long Island, New York
- Known for: Founding Southampton, New York
- Spouse(s): (1) Frances Paxton (2) Eleanor
- Children: Children with Frances Paxton: Henry; John; Edward; Richard (m. Elizabeth Halsey); Dorothy; Margaret; Margery; Children with Eleanor: Henry; Arthur (m. Elizabeth Gardiner); Edmund
- Parents: Henry Howell, Lord of Westbury (father); Margaret Hawten (Hawtayne) (mother)

Signature
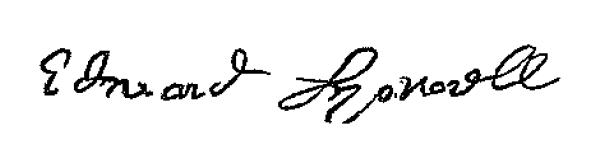

Edward Howell, Gent. (1584–1655), born in Marsh Gibbon, Buckinghamshire, was an English Puritan who settled at Lynn, Massachusetts in 1635. He was known for the founding of Southampton, New York with Edward Howell, Edmond Farrington, Edmund Needham, Abraham Pierson the Elder, Thomas Sayre, Josiah Stanborough, George Welbe, Henry Walton, Job Sayre, and Thomas Halsey in 1639/40.

== Early life and immigration to New England ==
Edward Howell was baptized on 26 July 1584 at Marsh Gibbon, Buckinghamshire, England. He was son of Henry Howell, Gent. and Margaret Hawten (Hawtayne) and heir to Westbury Manor. Howell and his family (see below) immigrated to Boston c. 1635, where they first settled at Lynn, Massachusetts, where they were one of the four largest landowners. In 1638, he sold Westbury Manor to Richard Francis. On 14 Mar 1638/39, he took the oath as Freeman in Boston, Massachusetts where he received 500 acres at Lynn.

== Founding of Southampton, Long Island, New York ==
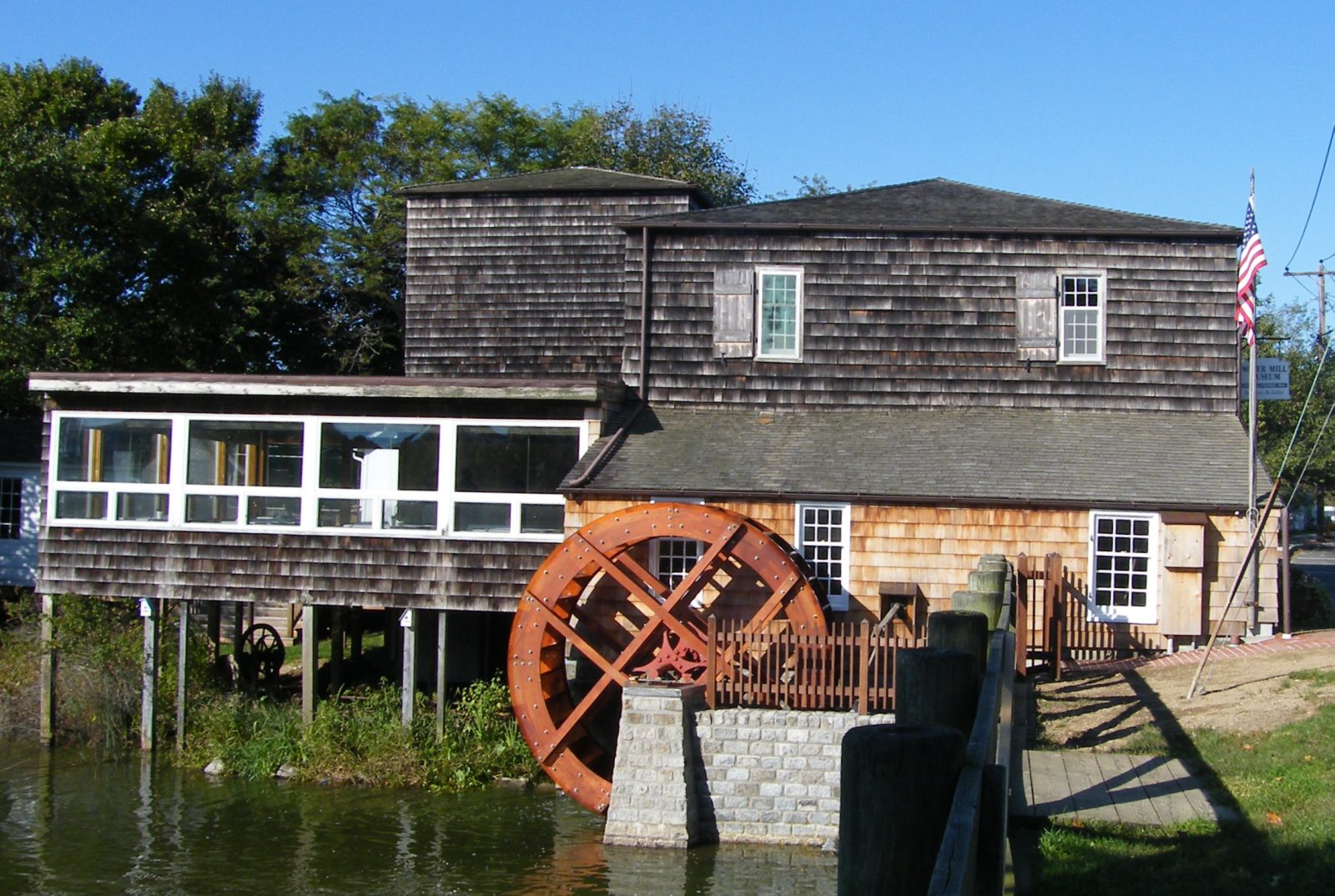
Howell's Water Mill (Water Mill, Southampton, New York)

During the winter of 1638/40, a new settlement was projected on Long Island, New York, of which Edward was the leader. The agreement, or term, of this new settlement, which is still in existence in the Southampton Town Clerk's Office, is believed to be in Edward's own handwriting. In 1640 the Howell family removed permanently to Southampton, Long Island, New York, first settling at "Old Town", and then in 1648, at what is now the current village of Southampton (New York).

The original founders, or "undertakers" as they were then called, of Southampton were: Edward Howell; Edmund Farrington; Josias Stanborouh; George Welbe; Job Sayre; Edmund Needham; Henry Walton; Daniel How; John Cooper; Allen Bread; William Harker; Thomas Halsey; Thomas Newell; John Farrington; Richard Odell; Phiip Kyrtland; Thomas Farrington; and Thomas Terry. He took a leading role in the affairs of Southampton, serving in many capacities there an in Connecticut, of which Southampton became a part following a request made by himself and two others 25 October 1644. He served as magistrate in Southampton until 1653 and Assistant of the Connecticut Colony from 1647 to 1653. The original settlement, called "Mecox", was a name taken from the Shinnecock Indians for "flat or plain country." Howell announced that he would build a mill for the grinding of grain, rye and wheat into flour. The colonists expected him to build a wind mill but Howell instead chose an area of land that allowed for a stream to power the mill (one which empties into the present Mecox Bay). Nearly four hundred years later, Howell's Water Mill still stands in present-day Water Mill where it was listed on National Register of Historic Places in 1983. For one hundred and fifty years, the Howells were the most extensive landowners, the largest taxpayers and held the highest offices.

== Family ==
Edward Howell married (1st) at Odell, Bedfordshire, England Frances Paxton on 7 April 1616 (d. 1630). They had four sons and three daughters:

1. Henry Howell (bapt. 2 Dec 1618, bur. 29 Aug 1619)
2. John Howell (bapt. 24 Nov 1622)
3. Edward Howell (bapt. Sep 1626)
4. Richard Howell (bapt. 1629, d. aft. 1698) m. Elizabeth Halsey (dau. of Thomas Halsey of Hertfordshire, England & founder of Southampton, New York)
5. Dorothy Howell
6. Margaret Howell (bapt. 24 Nov 1622) m. the Rev. John Moore of Southold, Long Island
7. Margery Howell (bapt. 1 Jun 1628)

He married (2nd) Eleanor (before 1632).

1. Henry Howell
2. Arthur Howell (bapt. 1632) m. Elizabeth Gardiner (dau. of Lion Gardiner, English colonist who founded Gardiner's Island, Long Island)
3. Edmund Howell

== Death and legacy ==
Edward Howell died shortly before 6 October 1655 and was buried in the Southend Cemetery, Southampton, Long Island, New York. In 1657, his widow. Eleanor, was granted 20 shillings in compensation for her house being burned by a Native tribe. She next married before 14 March 1663 Thomas Sayre.

The Edward Howell Family Association (EHFA) is a lineage society for descendants of Howell.
