= Inauguration of James A. Garfield =

24th United States presidential inauguration

Presidential inauguration of James A. Garfield
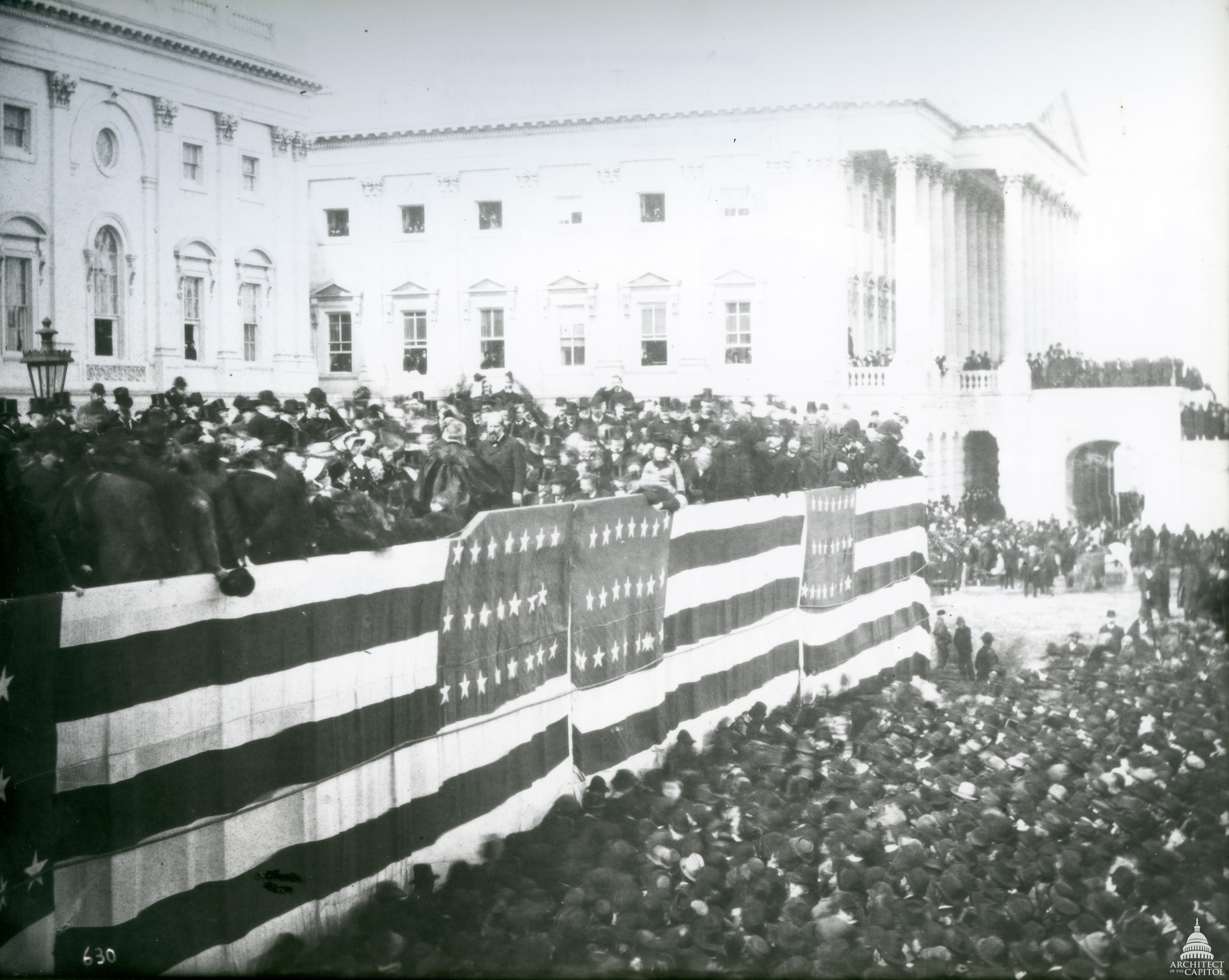
- Date: March 4, 1881; 145 years ago
- Location: United States Capitol, Washington, D.C.
- Participants: James A. Garfield; 20th president of the United States — Assuming office Morrison Waite; Chief Justice of the United States — Administering oath Chester A. Arthur; 20th vice president of the United States — Assuming office William A. Wheeler; 19th vice president of the United States — Administering oath

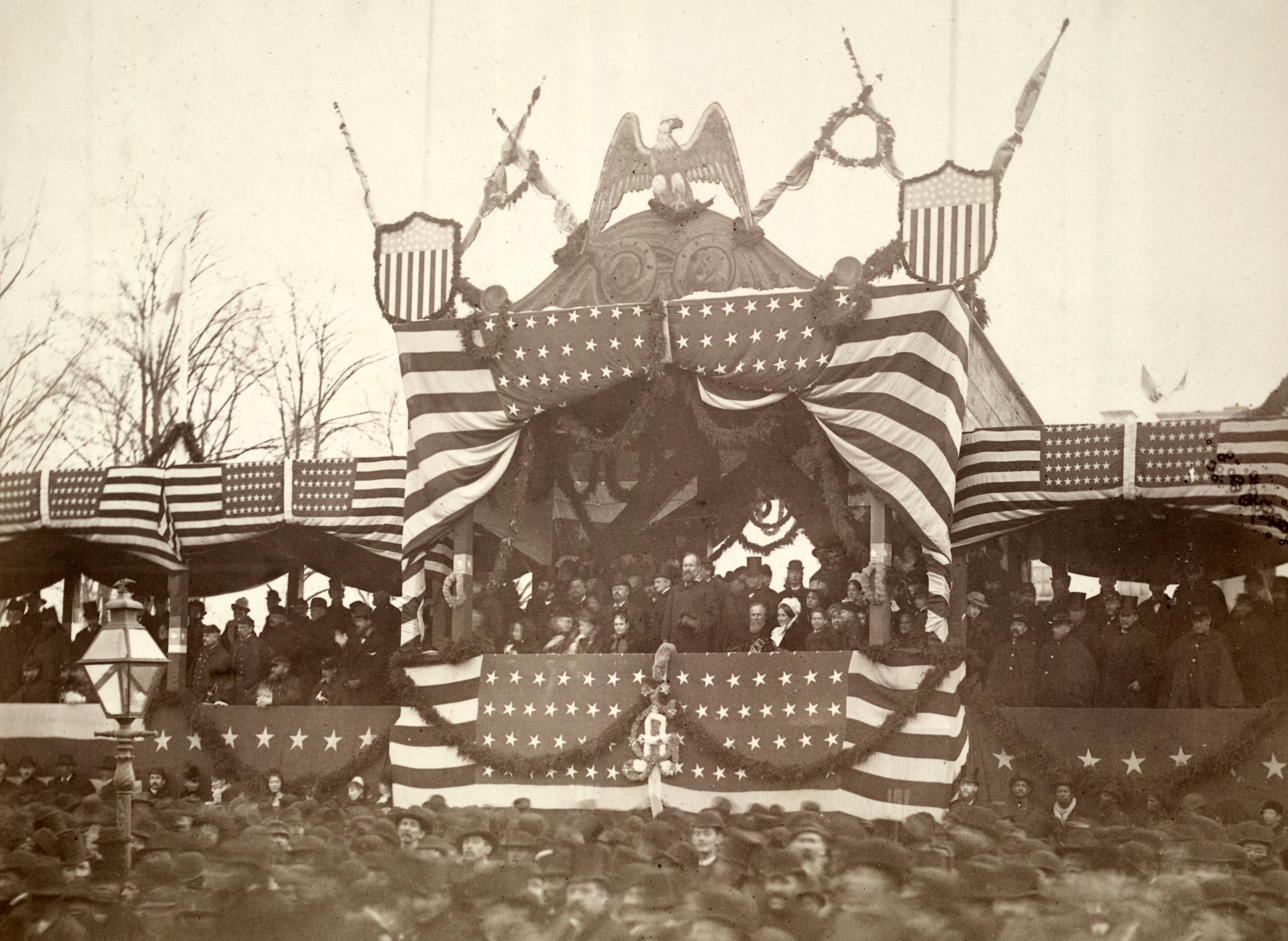
Garfield (center, standing) on the reviewing stand in front of the White House for his inaugural parade; Garfield's wife Lucretia is seated at his right, outgoing president Rutherford B. Hayes and his wife Lucy at his left

The inauguration of James A. Garfield as the 20th president of the United States was held on Friday, March 4, 1881, at the East Portico of the United States Capitol in Washington, D.C. It was the 24th inauguration and marked the commencement of the only four-year term of James A. Garfield as president and Chester A. Arthur as vice president. Garfield was assassinated 199 days into this term, and Arthur ascended to the presidency. Chief Justice Morrison Waite administered the presidential oath of office.

== Inauguration ==
Garfield left his home in Mentor, Ohio, for Washington, D.C., on Monday, February 28, 1881.

In his address, Garfield denounced attempts to impede African-American suffrage, expressed his confidence in the gold standard, warned against the dangers of high rates of illiteracy, and admonished the practice of polygamy by members of the Church of Jesus Christ of Latter-day Saints. Garfield was recognized as an extremely competent public speaker, but faced difficulty when composing his inaugural address. Three days before his inauguration, he scrapped his speech and feverishly began work on a new one. Exhausted by several sleepless nights of writing, he delivered his rushed oration on March 4, but it failed to live up to the high expectations of many of those present.

== Inaugural ball ==
Garfield's inaugural ball was hosted the night of the inauguration in the Smithsonian Institution's Arts and Industries Building, completed earlier that year. The centerpiece of the celebration was a large "Statue of America" in the museum's rotunda, who held an electric light in her raised right hand. The music at the event was directed by conductor John Philip Sousa, and performed by the Germania Orchestra of Philadelphia and the United States Marine Band.

== See also ==
- Presidency of James A. Garfield
- 1880 United States presidential election
