= Bibliography of William McKinley =

This bibliography of William McKinley is a comprehensive list of written and published works about or by William McKinley, the 25th president of the United States.

== Domestic issues and politics ==
- Armstrong, William H. Major McKinley: William McKinley and the Civil War (2000)
- Faulkner, Harold U. Politics, Reform, and Expansion, 1890–1900 (1959)
- Glad, Paul W. McKinley, Bryan, and the People (1964)
- Jensen, Richard. The Winning of the Midwest: Social and Political Conflict, 1888–1896 (1971)
- Jones, Stanley L. The Presidential Election of 1896 (1964)
- Josephson, Matthew. The Politicos: 1865–1896 (1938)
- Morgan, H. Wayne. From Hayes to McKinley: National Party Politics, 1877–1896 (1969)
- Rhodes, James Ford. The McKinley and Roosevelt Administrations, 1897–1909 (1922)
- Saldin, Robert P. "William McKinley and the Rhetorical Presidency," Presidential Studies Quarterly (March 2011) 41#1 pp. 119–34, doi:10.1111/j.1741-5705.2010.03833.x
- Skrabec, Quentin R. William McKinley, apostle of protectionism (Algora, 2008).
- Williams, R. Hal. Years of Decision: American Politics in the 1890s (1993).

== Foreign policy ==
- Bradley, James (2009). Imperial Cruise. Back Bay Books / Little, Brown and Company. ISBN 978-0-316-00895-2.
- Crompton, Samuel Willard (2009). The Sinking of the USS Maine: Declaring War Against Spain. New York: Infobase Publishing. ISBN 978-1-60413-049-2.
- Dobson, John M. Reticient Expansionism: The Foreign Policy of William McKinley. (1988).
- Fry Joseph A. "William McKinley and the Coming of the Spanish–American War: A Study of the Besmirching and Redemption of an Historical Image," Diplomatic History 3 (Winter 1979): 77–97
- Gould, Lewis L. The Spanish–American War and President McKinley (1982)
- Hamilton, Richard. President McKinley, War, and Empire (2006).
- Harrington, Fred H. "The Anti-Imperialist Movement in the United States, 1898–1900," Mississippi Valley Historical Review, Vol. 22, No. 2 (Sept. 1935), pp. 211–30 JSTOR 1898467
- Holbo, Paul S. "Presidential Leadership in Foreign Affairs: William McKinley and the Turpie-Foraker Amendment," The American Historical Review 1967 72 (4): 1321–35. JSTOR 1847795
- Kapur, Nick (2011). "William McKinley's Values and the Origins of the Spanish-American War: A Reinterpretation". Presidential Studies Quarterly. 41 (1): 18–38. doi:10.1111/j.1741-5705.2010.03829.x. JSTOR 23884754
- May, Ernest. Imperial Democracy: The Emergence of America as a Great Power (1961)
- Offner, John L. "McKinley and the Spanish–American War," Presidential Studies Quarterly Vol. 34#1 (2004) pp 50+.
- Offner, John L. An Unwanted War: The Diplomacy of the United States and Spain over Cuba, 1895–1898 (1992)
- Paterson. Thomas G. "United States Intervention in Cuba, 1898: Interpretations of the Spanish-American-Cuban-Filipino War," The History Teacher, Vol. 29, No. 3 (May 1996), pp. 341–61 JSTOR 494551
- Trask, David. The War with Spain in 1898. (1981).

== Speeches and manuscripts ==
- McKinley, William. Speeches and Addresses of William McKinley: from his election to Congress to the present time (1893)
- McKinley, William. Abraham Lincoln. An Address by William McKinley of Ohio. Before the Marquette Club. Chicago. February 12, 1896 (1896)
- McKinley, William. Speeches and Addresses of William McKinley: from March 1, 1897, to May 30, 1900 (1900)
- McKinley, William. The Tariff; a Review of the Tariff Legislation of the United States from 1812 to 1896 (1904)
