= Stephen French =

American educator, lawyer, and soldier

Stephen French, Esq.
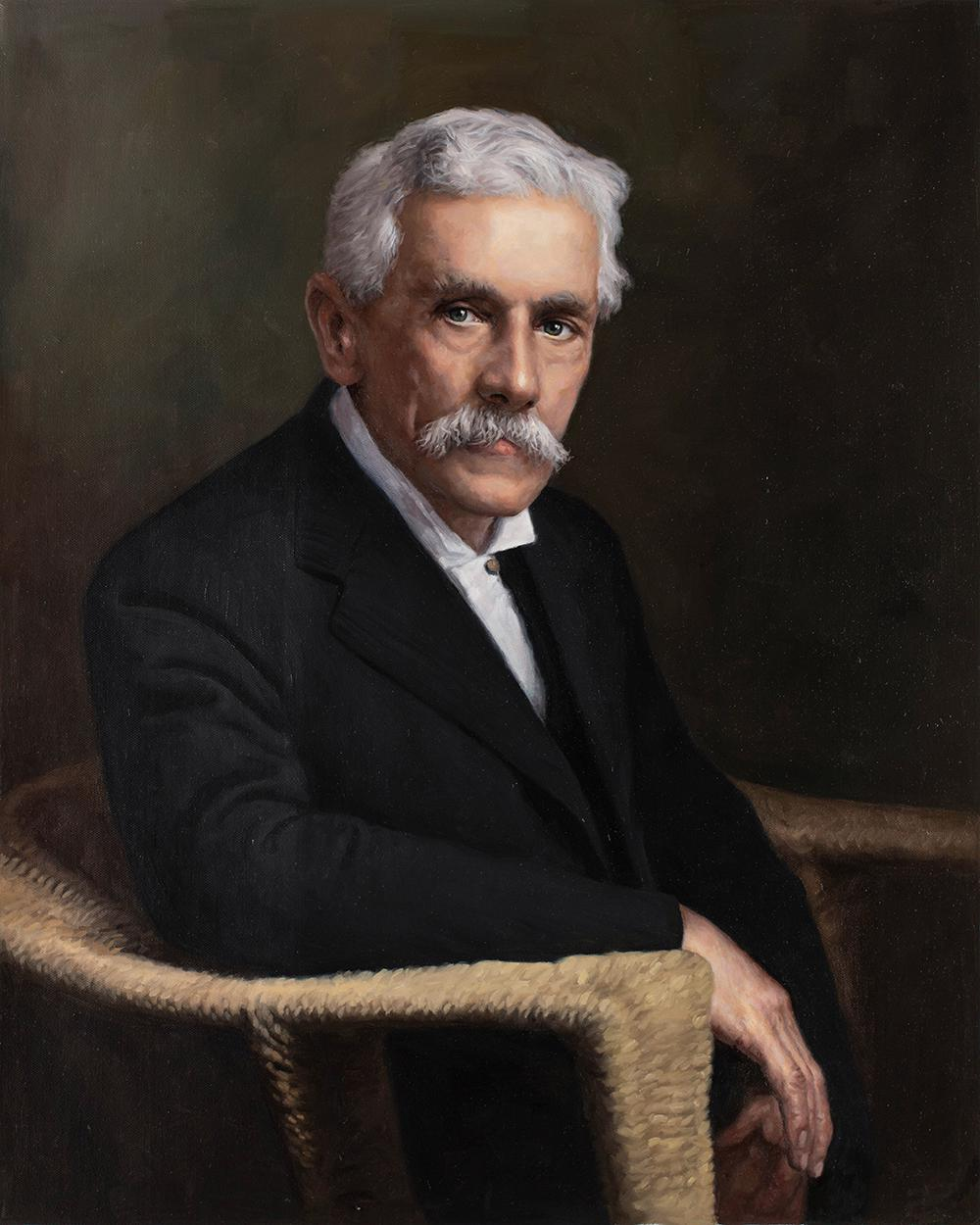
- Stephen French in 1920
- Born: May 23, 1844; Marion County, Illinois, U.S.
- Died: January 2, 1929 (aged 84); San Diego, California, U.S.
- Resting place: Mt. Hope Cemetery, San Diego, California
- Occupations: Lawyer, Educator
- Organization(s): Odd Fellows, Good Templars
- Known for: Escaping captivity at Andersonville Prison during the Civil War
- Notable work: "Recollections of Five Days in the Forest of Georgia 1864. Escape from Andersonville Prison. Recapture and Final Release" (1910); A Prisoner in Dixieland: The Civil War Memoir of Stephen French (2026)
- Title: Esquire
- Spouse: Margaret Alice Phillips
- Children: 3

Stephen French, Esq. (23 May 1844 – 1929) was an American educator, lawyer and Civil War veteran. He was known for being captured by the Confederate army during the American Civil War, imprisoned at Andersonville prisoner-of-war camp, having escaped captivity for five days in the forests of Georgia, and being re-captured and re-imprisoned at Andersonville. His personal account, titled "Recollections of Five Days in the Forest of Georgia 1864. Escape from Andersonville Prison. Recapture and Final Release" was published in The National Tribune as a serial in 1926 under the title "Experiences of a Prisoner in Dixieland." His entire Civil War experience, from 1862 to 1865, is the subject of a forthcoming book – A Prisoner in Dixieland: The Civil War Memoir of Stephen French – by Potomac Books (University of Nebraska Press).

== Early life ==
Stephen French was born on 23 May 1844 in Marion County, Illinois, the son of Joseph Hartman French and Susannah Lemon Purcell. Stephen had four brothers and six sisters.

== Civil War service & captivity-escape-recapture at Andersonville Prison Camp ==
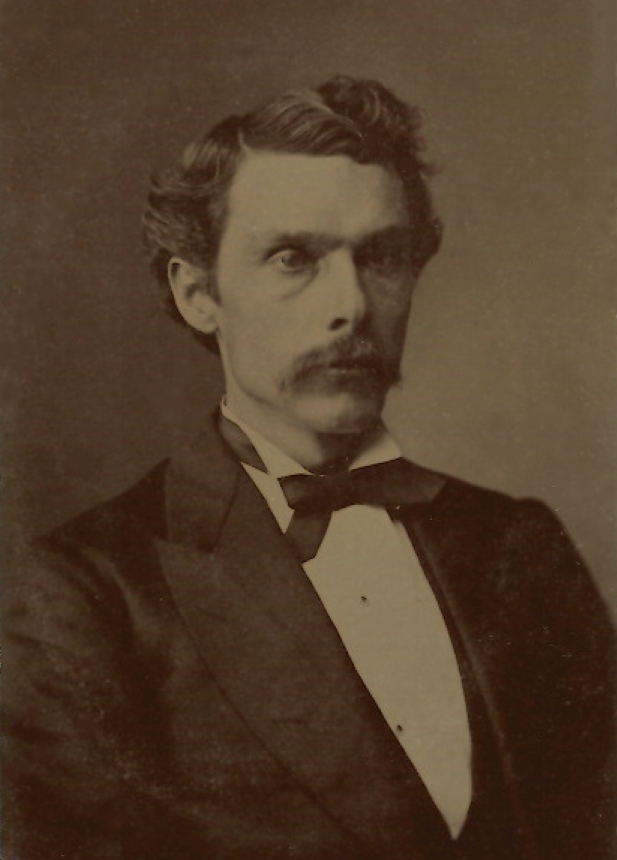
Stephen French (c. 1862), before enlisting as a Union volunteer in the Civil War.

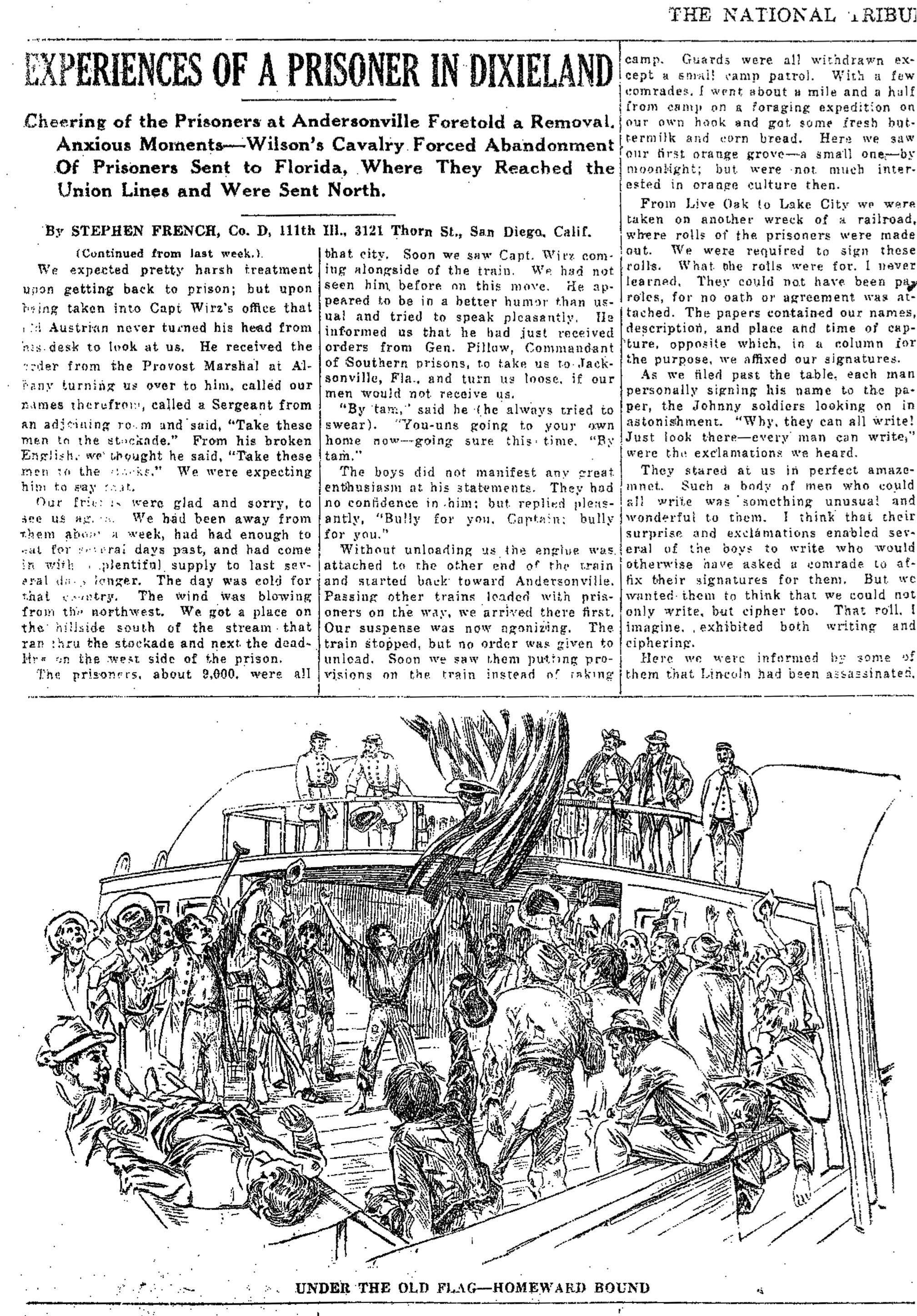
"Experiences of a Prisoner in Dixieland" from The National Tribune (1926)

Stephen passed his boyhood at home until the second year of the Civil War when he enlisted in the 111th Illinois Volunteer Infantry. He served in the army until the close of the war, spending the last nine months of the time as a prisoner in Andersonville. In company with three other soldiers, he attempted an escape but was captured and returned. He wrote his narrative in 1887 under the title "Recollections of Five Days in the Forest of Georgia 1864. Escape from Andersonville Prison. Recapture and Final Release" and his account was published serially in The National Tribune of Washington, D.C., in 1926 under the title "Experiences of a Prisoner in Dixieland." His Civil War experiences from 1862 to 1865 are the subject of a forthcoming book – A Prisoner in Dixieland: The Civil War Memoir of Stephen French – by Potomac Books (University of Nebraska Press).

== Post-war, marriage & family ==
Following the end of the Civil War, Stephen French took up residence in Greenville, Illinois. There, he was an active member of the Odd Fellows, Good Templars and of a debating club composed of the youngest business and professional men. Upon leaving Greenville in the 1870s, he began teaching, for several years serving the principal of the Converse School in Springfield, Illinois. Later, he took up the practice of law. He returned to Greenville to marry Margaret Alice Phillips (1846-1929) on 4 December 1873, a graduate of Almira College (now Greenville University) and a granddaughter of Zachariah Connell, founder of Connellsville, Pennsylvania. Margaret was the daughter of John Wesley Phillips (and granddaughter of War of 1812 Capt. John Phillips), and Margaret Rice Connell (1808-1895) (a daughter of Margaret Wallace and Zachariah Connell (1741-1815), Revolutionary War soldier and founder of Connellsville, Pennsylvania).

Stephen and Margaret had three daughters:

1. Margaret Elizabeth "Eva Grace" (French) Lawrance (29 Jul 1879 - 1 Jan 1945), who graduated from the University of California, Berkeley in 1903; m. on 25 Dec 1913 Harry Augustus Lawrance (b. 7 May 1887, d. 16 Apr 1917)
2. Lillian Ruth French (1877-1967, died unmarried), who attended the University of California
3. Eleanor Alice French (1874-1971, died unmarried), who attended the University of California and Pomona College (Claremont, CA)

In 1887, Stephen and Margaret moved to San Diego, California. During their long residence in San Diego, French was keenly interested in church work. He taught in the Sunday school, and for almost forty years was a member of the official board of the First Methodist Episcopal Church. He was a loyal supporter of the temperance cause, in full sympathy with his wife's notable work in the W.C.T.U.

== Death ==
Stephen French was struck by a car outside his home in San Diego, California, and succumbed to his injuries on 2 January 1929 (age 84). His wife, Margaret, died on 16 October 1929 in San Diego from pneumonia. Stephen and Margaret French are interred at Mt. Hope Cemetery, San Diego, California.
