= Thomas Halsey (1591–1679) =

- Coat of arms for Thomas Halsey of Hertfordshire, England & Southampton, New York
- Born: 1591; Hertfordshire, England
- Died: 27 August 1678; Southampton, New York
- Known for: Co-founding the town of Southampton, New York
- Spouse(s): (1) Phebe/Phoebe (2) Ann Johnes
- Children: Thomas Halsey; Isaac Halsey; Daniel Halsey; Elizabeth Halsey (m. Richard Howell)
- Parents: Robert Halsey (father); Dorothy Downes (mother)
- Relatives: Sir John Halsey, Knt.
- Family: Halsey of the Parsonage, Great Gaddesden

Signature
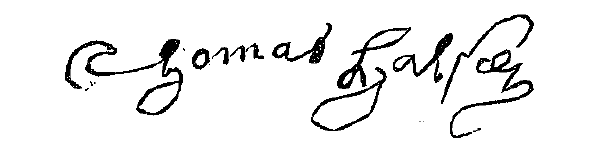

Thomas Halsey (1591/2 – 1678) was born 2 January 1591/2 in Hertfordshire, England and died 27 August 1678 in Southampton, New York. He emigrated from England in 1633 to New England, and eventually co-founded, with Edmond Farrington, Edmund Needham, Abraham Pierson the Elder, Thomas Sayre, Josiah Stanborough, George Welbe, Henry Walton, Job Sayre, and Edward Howell, the town of Southampton, New York in 1640.

== Ancestry ==
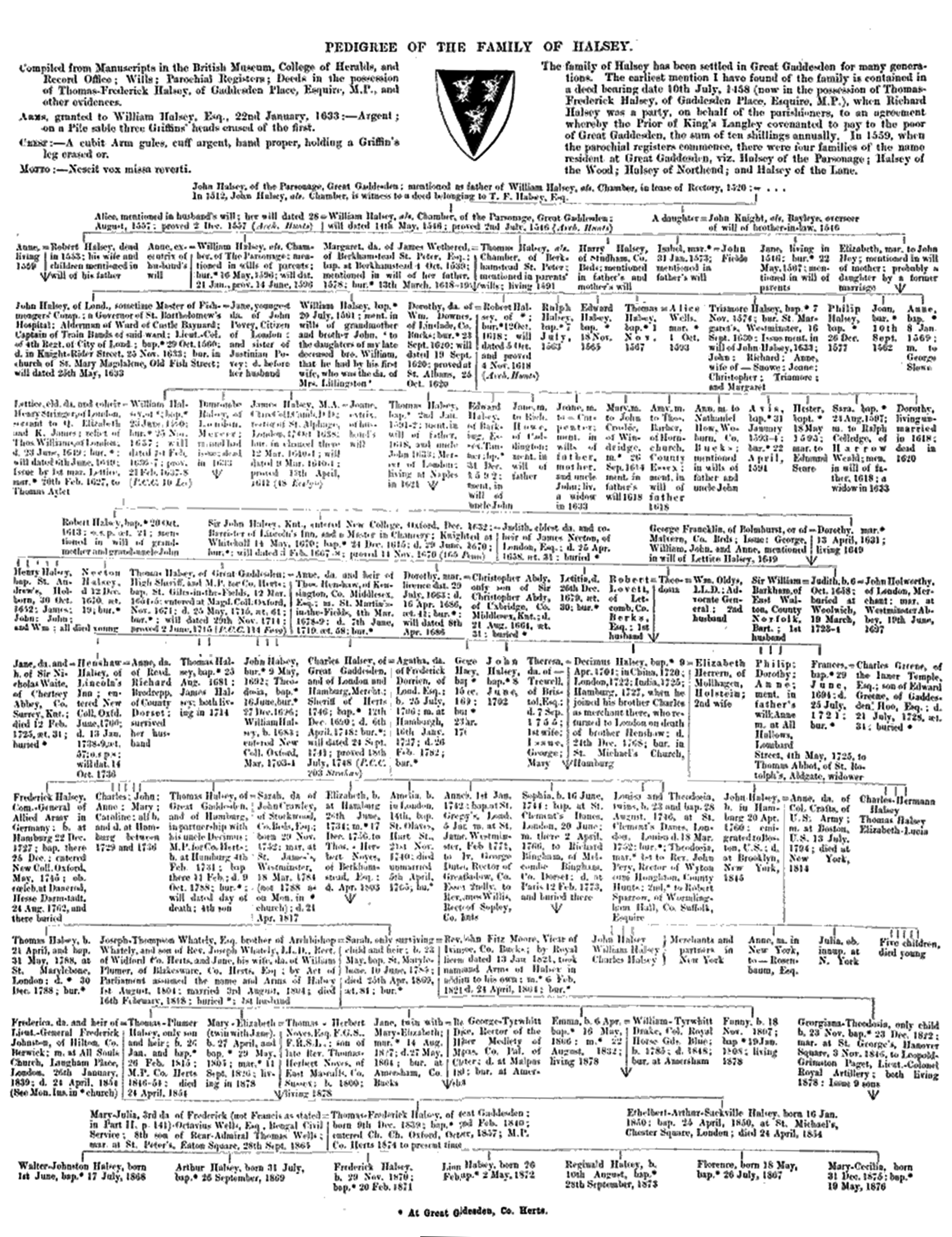
Pedigree of the Family of Halsey of Hertfordshire, showing ancestry of Thomas Halsey, immigrant & founder of Southampton, L.I., New York.

The earliest Englishman bearing the name "Halsey" lived in the western end of Cornwall. The home of the Cornish Halseys was a manor of Lanesley. According to Halsey's Thomas Halsey of Hertfordshire..., that in the time of Richard I (crowned 1189), this estate comprised "the lands of the family surnamed de Als, now Hals, so called from the barton, and dismantled manor of Als, now Alse and Alesa, in Buryan, as tradition saith, or Bar Alston, Alston, in Devon in possession of Trevanin, and others, whereof they were Lords, and in particular William de Als in the beginning of the reign of King Henry III of England, that marred Mary, the daughter of Francis de Bray, was possessed thereof, father of Simon de Als who lived in Halsham in Yorkshire from him denominated." The Halseys of Cornwall and Devon were related to those of the name living at the Great Gaddesden Parsonage in Hertfordshire, England. In Cussan's History of Hertfordshire, he mentions a Thomas Halsey who was baptized 2 Jan 1592, who was a mercer in London, living in Naples in 1621, and afterward, it is believed, an emigrant to America. The first mention of this family found by Cussan was of a Richard Halsey of Great Gadesden in 1458. In 1559, when the parish registers commence, there were four families of this name in that place: Halsey of the Parsonage; Halsey of the Wood; Halsey of the Northend; and Halsey of the Lane. The descent to Thomas Halsey, the Southampton settler, is as follows:

1. John Halsey of the Parsonage (of the Parsonage, Great Gaddesden), living 1512, had son,
2. William (of the Parsonage, Great Gaddesden), who d. in 1546, and who had w. Alice, who d. 1557, and ch. Robert, William, Thomas, Harry, Isabel, Jane and Elizabeth.
3. William (of the Parsonage), the second son of William, d. May, 1596, had w. Anne and ch. John, William, Robert, Ralph, Edward, Thomas, Triamore, Philip, Joan and Anne.
4. Robert, the third son of the second Wiliam Halsey, died October 1618, and m. Dorothy, d. of Wm. Downes of Linslade, Co. of Bucks. She d. Sept. 1620. They had ch. William, bap. June 23, 1690, Thomas bap. Jan. 2, 1590/91, Duncombe, James, Edward, Jane, Joane, Mary, Amy, Ann, Avis, Hester, Sara and Dorothy.
5. Thomas, the second son of Robert, is the one identified as the Southampton emigrant.

The complete pedigree of this Halsey family, beginning with John Halsey of the Parsonage (1512), can be viewed here.

It is noted in Howell's History of Southampton that "this family, like many others of Southampton, was of high social position in the mother country. One of its representatives in England, Rt. Hon. Thomas Frederick Halsey, 1st Baronet, was a member of Parliament (1874–1906). Burke's shows the direct descent of Thomas Halsey (c. 1731–1788), a British merchant and politician who sat in the House of Commons between 1768 and 1784, from John Halsey of the Parsonage (living 1512) above.

== Halsey in America ==
Thomas Halsey's arrival in America was connected with the colonization efforts led by John Winthrop. Those who founded the Massachusetts Bay Colony were Puritans: like their Plymouth counterparts. Thomas Halsey was one of the earliest settlers of Lynn, Massachusetts (as early as 1637), but it is believed Thomas reached Boston as early as 1633, the year in which he was granted his coat of arms. In a record that survived a fire at Lynn, it is recorded that in 1638 he was allotted one hundred acres of land. When the migration to Long Island in 1640 began, Winthrop remarks that the Long Island company, in "finding themselves straightened, looked about for a new plantation." Having obtained their content from Winthrop, on March 10, 1639, articles of agreement had been signed at Lynn, and Thomas Halsey, being one of the signers, described the conditions and terms under which the new settlement was to be founded. It is recorded and written in Jacob Lafayette Halsey's Thomas Halsey of Hertfordshire, England, and Southampton, Long Island, 1581–1679 that Thomas "remained many years in Southampton and was the richest man in the place;" and that he had "much influence in town affairs" and "was active in establishing the Connecticut jurisdiction, and in 1669 was a representative." From the town records of Southampton, it was recorded that Thomas Halsey was not only an active citizen but one "possessed of independence of spirit and a strong will, and not always respectful to his fellow townsmen," although he had been well-educated and styled a "gentleman" in the records.

== Halsey House ==
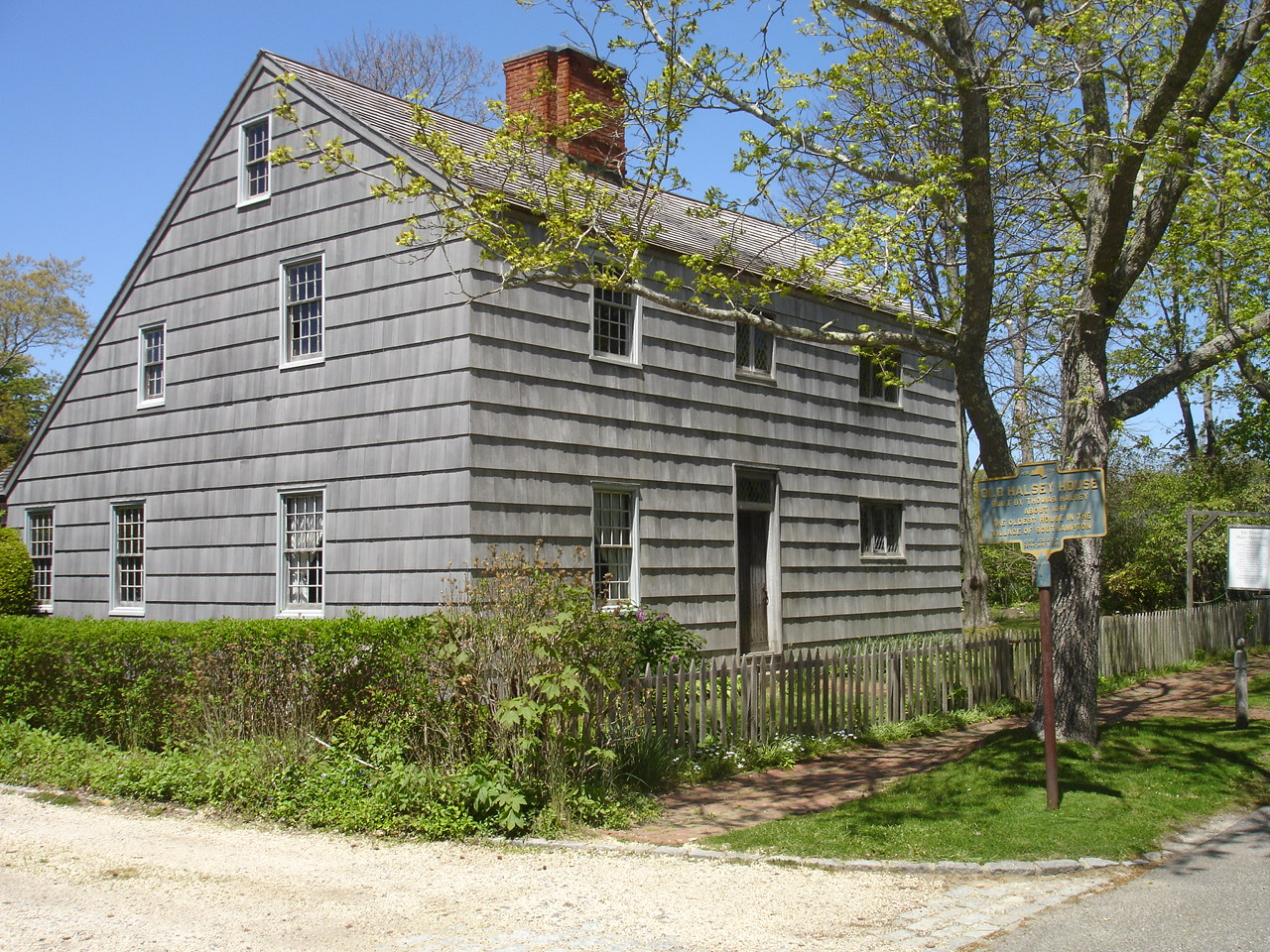
Thomas Halsey Homestead (built 1648, Southampton, New York)

According to the museum, the collection includes "17th- and 18th-century furnishings, a Dominy clock, and a rare 16th-century Breeches Bible, this version speaks of Adam and Eve wearing 'breeches made of fig leaves.'" The grounds include herb and flower gardens and an orchard that are overseen by the Southampton Colonial Society. The Halsey House is also a common gathering place for social events, and a variety of programs open to the public.

Coat of arms for Thomas Halsey of Hertfordshire, England & Southampton, New York

== Family ==
Thomas married (1st) Phoebe before 1637. She was murdered by two Pequot Native Americans in 1649. He married (2nd) Ann Johnes on 25 July 1660, widow of Edward Johnes.

Children of Thomas Halsey and Phoebe (d. 1649):

1. Thomas Halsey (b. abt. 1627) m. Mary (d. 20 Dec 1699)
2. Isaac Halsey (b. abt. 1628/29) m. Mary
3. Daniel Halsey (b. abt. 1630–1633, d. abt. 1682), buried at Wickapogue, New York, m. Jemima
4. Elizabeth Halsey m. Richard Howell (son of Edward Howell, founder of Southampton, New York)

== Coat of arms ==
The arms of this family are said by Cussan to have been granted to William Halsey, the elder brother of Thomas of Southampton, in 1633, and are as follows:

Argent, on a pile sable, three griffin's heads erased of the first.

Crest: A cubit arm gules, cuff argent, hand proper, holding a griffin's leg erased or.

Motto: Nescit vox missa reverti (a word once uttered cannot be recalled)
