= Timeline of the Benjamin Harrison presidency =

The presidency of Benjamin Harrison began on March 4, 1889, when Benjamin Harrison was inaugurated as the twenty-third president of the United States and ended on March 4, 1893, after one term.

== 1889 ==
=== March 1889 ===
- March 4 – Benjamin Harrison is inaugurated as the twenty-third president of the United States. Levi P. Morton becomes vice president of the United States.
- March 5 – James G. Blaine, William Windom, Redfield Proctor, William H. H. Miller, John Wanamaker, Benjamin F. Tracy, John Willock Noble, and Jeremiah M. Rusk become secretary of state, secretary of the treasury, secretary of war, attorney general, postmaster general, secretary of the navy, secretary of the interior, and secretary of agriculture, respectively.
- March 7 – Harrison holds his first cabinet meeting. They decide against using informal advisors or favorable treatment.
- March 21 – Harrison issues a proclamation to ban the hunting of animals with fur in Alaska.
- March 23 – Harrison issues a proclamation declaring that lands owned by the Muscogee and Seminole can be settled.

=== April 1889 ===
- April 4 – Harrison issues a proclamation honoring the one-hundredth anniversary of the first inauguration of George Washington.
- April 14 – Harrison begins a tour of the western United States.
- April 29 – The Berlin Conference begins. Germany, the United Kingdom, and the United States negotiate their control over the Samoan Islands.

=== May 1889 ===
- May 7 – Harrison appoints New York politician Theodore Roosevelt as Civil Service Commissioner.
- May 31 – The South Fork Dam fails in Pennsylvania. Fourteen miles downstream, Johnstown, Pennsylvania, is flooded and destroyed. Over 2,200 people are killed.

=== June 1889 ===
- June 1 – Harrison ends his tour of the western United States.
- June 4 – Harrison speaks at a charity event in the Willard Hotel for the Johnstown flood.
- June 14 – Germany, the United Kingdom, and the United States sign the Treaty of Berlin to create a neutral protectorate for the Samoan Islands.

=== July 1889 ===
- July 12 – The United States signs an extradition treaty with the United Kingdom.

=== August 1889 ===
- August 3 – Harrison meets with Bureau of Pensions director James R. Tanner. He tells Tanner that the current pension policy risks eliminating the federal surplus.
- August 6 – Harrison begins a tour of New England.
- August 12 – Harrison speaks to the Grand Army of the Republic in Boston.
- August 16 – Harrison ends his tour of new England.
- August 21 – Harrison begins a tour of Indiana and Ohio.
- August 23 – Harrison ends his tour of Indiana and Ohio.

=== September 1889 ===
- September 12 – Bureau of Pensions director James R. Tanner resigns on Harrison's request. Harrison believes that Tanner approves pension requests too frequently.

=== October 1889 ===
- October 2 – The first Pan-American Conference begins in Washington, D.C.

=== November 1889 ===
- November 2 – North Dakota and South Dakota become the thirty-ninth and fortieth states, respectively.
- November 8 – Montana becomes the forty-first state.
- November 11 – Washington becomes the forty-second state.

=== December 1889 ===
- December 2 – The 51st United States Congress convenes for its first session.
- December 4 – Harrison nominates David J. Brewer to the Supreme Court.
- December 3 – Harrison delivers the 1889 State of the Union Address. He supports Indian schools and criticizes anti-competitive trusts.
- December 18 – David J. Brewer is confirmed to the Supreme Court.

== 1890 ==
=== February 1890 ===
- February 10 – The United States signs a treaty of commerce and navigation with the Kingdom of Greece.

=== March 1890 ===
- March 4 – Henry Clay Caldwell to the U.S. Circuit Court for the Eighth Circuit.
- March 15 – Harrison issues a proclamation expanding a ban on hunting in Alaska.

=== April 1890 ===
- April 24
  - Harrison issues an executive order to authorize the arrest of people causing unrest in Florida.
  - The Pan American Union issues its report.
- April 25 – The World's Columbian Exposition is authorized and funded to celebrate the four-hundredth anniversary of the Voyages of Christopher Columbus.

=== May 1890 ===
- May 19 – Harrison delivers a report to Congress from the Pan-American Conference about planning a railroad to connect North America and South America.

=== June 1890 ===
- June 6 – Harrison issues a statement to Congress that it is preferable for laws to be enforced locally, but that he will involve the federal government if this fails. This is a response to his executive order authorizing arrests during civil unrest in Florida.
- June 25 – The United States signs a treaty with Mexico on the right to pursue Indians over national borders.
- June 27 – The Dependent and Disability Pension Act grants pensions to Union Civil War veterans and their families. This is an early example of welfare state policies in the United States.

=== July 1890 ===
- July 2
  - Sherman Antitrust Act bans anti-competitive trusts that restrict interstate commerce.
  - Following the Brussels Anti-Slavery Conference 1889–1890, the United States signs the Brussels Conference Act of 1890 to regulate trade that harms the people of Africa.
- July 3 – Idaho becomes the forty-third state.
- July 5 – The United States becomes a founding member of the International Union for the Publication of Customs Tariffs.
- July 10 – Wyoming becomes the forty-fourth state.
- July 14 – The Sherman Silver Purchase Act increases the authorized purchase of silver to 4.5 million ounces per month.
- July 29 – Harrison asks Congress to ban the sale of lottery tickets by mail. He describes it as exploitative of the poor and morally corrupt.

=== September 1890 ===
- September 19 – The Anti-Lottery Act bans the sale of lottery tickets by mail.

=== October 1890 ===
- October 1
  - The McKinley Tariff raises duties on manufactured goods and grants the president greater power over trade.
  - The 51st United States Congress adjourns from its first session.
- October 13 – Harrison begins a tour of Ohio, Illinois, Indiana, and Missouri.
- October 16 – Harrison ends his tour of Ohio, Illinois, Indiana, and Missouri.

=== November 1890 ===
- November 4 – The 1890 United States elections take place. The Republican Party loses 93 of its 179 seats in the House of Representatives. It retains control of the Senate.

=== December 1890 ===
- December 1
  - The 51st United States Congress convenes for its second session.
  - Harrison delivers the 1890 State of the Union Address. He expresses support for the Pan-American Conference and the McKinley Tariff.
- December 4 – The Farmers' Alliance meets in Ocala, Florida, to form the Populist Party.
- December 8 – Harrison asks Congress to let him provide aid to settlers in Oklahoma affected by the flooding of the Mississippi River.
- December 23 – Harrison nominates Henry Billings Brown to the Supreme Court.
- December 24 – Harrison issues a proclamation announcing that the World's Columbian Exposition will be held in 1893 from May to October.
- December 29
  - The Wounded Knee Massacre occurs when American soldiers kill about 150 to 300 Lakota people during the Ghost Dance War.
  - Henry Billings Brown is confirmed to the Supreme Court.

== 1891 ==
=== January 1891 ===
- January 3 – The United States signs a treaty with Spain regarding commercial relations with respect to Cuba and Puerto Rico.
- January 16 – The Chilean Civil War of 1891 between the army and the navy of Chile.
- January 20 – King Kalākaua of the Hawaiian Kingdom dies in San Francisco. He is succeeded by Queen Liliʻuokalani.
- January 24 – The United States signs a treaty of amity, commerce, and navigation with Congo.
- January 29 – Secretary of the Treasury Willian Windom dies.

=== February 1891 ===
- February 3 – Marcus W. Acheson is confirmed to the U.S. Circuit Court for the Third Circuit.
- February 5 – Harrison issues a proclamation establishing a trade agreement with Brazil.
- February 7 – The Apportionment Act of 1891 increases the House of Representatives to 356 seats, effective in 1893.
- February 24 – Charles Foster becomes secretary of the treasury, filling the vacancy left by William Windom.

=== March 1891 ===
- March 3
  - The Judiciary Act of 1891 establishes nine United States courts of appeals as an intermediary to hear cases instead of going directly to the Supreme Court.
  - The Immigration Act of 1891 bans admission to the United States for "idiots, insane persons, paupers or persons likely to become a public charge, persons suffering from a loathsome or a dangerous contagious disease".
  - The Postal Subsidy Act authorizes the postmaster general to hire steamship companies to transport mail.
  - The 51st United States Congress adjourns from its second session.
- March 14 – Eleven immigrants from Sicily are lynched in New Orleans after being found not guilty in the murder of police chief David Hennessy. Italy will respond by severing ties with the United States.
- March 30 – Harrison issues a proclamation creating a forest reserve next to Yellowstone National Park.

=== April 1891 ===
- April 4 – Harrison begins a nationwide speaking tour.

=== May 1891 ===
- May 6 – The United States takes control of the rebel ship Itata during the Chilean Civil War.
- May 15 – Harrison finishes his nationwide speaking tour.

=== June 1891 ===
- June 4 – The United States signs establishes commercial relations with the Dominican Republic.
- June 15 – The United States signs a treaty with the United Kingdom on fur seal fisheries on the Bering Sea.

=== July 1891 ===
- July 4 – The United States joins an agreement regulating international mail through the Universal Postal Union.

=== August 1891 ===
- August – Electricity is installed in the White House.
- August 18 – Harrison begins a speaking tour of New York and Vermont.
- August 28 – Harrison finishes his speaking tour of New York and Vermont.

=== September 1891 ===
- September 18 – Harrison issues a proclamation authorizing the settlement of Native American land in Iowa.

=== October 1891 ===
- October 7 – Harrison speaks to the Ecumenical Methodist Conference in Washington, D.C.
- October 16 – Conflict breaks out between Chileans and American sailors in Valparaíso, Chile. Two Americans are killed.

=== December 1891 ===
- December 6 – Redfield Proctor ends his tenure as secretary of war.
- December 7 – The 52nd United States Congress convenes for its first session.
- December 9 – Harrison delivers the 1891 State of the Union Address. He asks Congress to authorize the use of force by the federal government to protect voting rights.
- December 16 – Harrison submits his nominations for the nine U.S. Circuit Courts. In numerical order, his nominees are William LeBaron Putnam, Nathaniel Shipman, George M. Dallas, Nathan Goff, Andrew Phelps McCormick, William Howard Taft, William Allen Woods, Walter Henry Sanborn, and Joseph McKenna.
- December 18 – The United States signs a treaty with the United Kingdom to resolve disputes on the Bering Sea.
- December 22 – Stephen B. Elkins becomes secretary of war, filling the vacancy left by Redfield Proctor.
- December 23 – The United States Board on Geographic Names is established.

== 1892 ==
=== January 1892 ===
- January 5 – Harrison asks Congress to fund food relief for Russia during a famine. Congress will deny his request.
- January 15 – The United States signs a copyright treaty with Germany.
- January 21 – The United States sends an ultimatum to Chile as tensions escalate between the nations.
- January 25 – Harrison states that his cabinet unanimously agrees on going to war with Chile. He asks Congress to take "appropriate action". He asks the Chilean government to apologize for the deaths of two American sailors.
- January 26 – Chile agrees to improve relations with the United States. It will pay $75,000 in restitution.

=== February 1892 ===
- February 16 – Harrison asks Congress to fund public inspectors for mines in federal territories.
- February 29 – The United States and the United Kingdom agree to send their Bering Sea border dispute to an arbitration tribunal.

=== March 1892 ===
- March 17 – Harrison's December 16 nominees are confirmed to their respective U.S. Circuit Courts.
- March 18 – William Ball Gilbert is confirmed to the U.S. Circuit Court for the Ninth Circuit.
- March 28 – Stanton J. Peelle is confirmed to the U.S. Court of Claims.

=== April 1892 ===
- April 18 – The United States signs a treaty with the United Kingdom on fur seal fisheries in the Bering Sea.
- April 26 – Harrison asks Congress to establish a free silver policy.

=== May 1892 ===
- May 5 – The Chinese Exclusion Act of 1882, which banned immigration from China, is renewed for ten more years.
- May 21 – Harrison strongly criticizes lynchings in the South in a letter to the Virginia Baptist Convention but says he does not have the Constitutional power to prevent them.

=== June 1892 ===
- June 3 – The United States signs a treaty with the United Kingdom on the recovery of deserters from merchant vessels.
- June 4 – Secretary of State James G. Blaine resigns over political disagreements with Harrison. He challenges Harrison for the Republican Party presidential nomination.
- June 10 – The 1892 Republican National Convention selects Harrison as the Republican Party's presidential nominee, with diplomat Whitelaw Reid as his running mate.
- June 15 – The United States signs a trademarks and trade labels treaty with Denmark.
- June 20 – Harrison asks Congress to issue retaliatory economic policies in response to Canadian tolls.
- June 23 – The 1892 Democratic National Convention selects former president Grover Cleveland as the Democratic Party's nominee for president, with former postmaster general Adlai Stevenson I as his running mate.
- June 29 – John W. Foster becomes secretary of state, filling the vacancy left by James G. Blaine.

=== July 1892 ===
- July 6 – Violent conflict breaks out between strikers and Pinkerton detectives in the Homestead strike, where workers had taken control of a Carnegie Steel Company factory in Pennsylvania and Pinkerton was hired to break the strike.
- July 10 – The Pennsylvania National Guard is deployed to suppress the Homestead strikers.
- July 11 – A labor strike at a silver mine in Coeur d'Alene, Idaho, turns violent when striking workers and non-striking workers fight. Thirty people are killed
- July 12
  - Pinkerton detectives return to the Homestead plant in Pennsylvania with 8,000 militiamen to break the strike.
  - Martial law is declared in Idaho after striking miners kill 12 non-striking miners.
- July 15 – Harrison issues a proclamation ordering Idaho strikers to disperse.
- July 19 – Harrison nominates George Shiras Jr. to the Supreme Court.
- July 22 – The United States signs an agreement to resolve boundary disputes with the United Kingdom.
- July 26 – George Shiras Jr. is confirmed to the Supreme Court.
- July 30
  - Harrison sends diplomat Whitelaw Reid to negotiate with Homestead manager Henry Clay Frick and end the strike. Negotiations are unsuccessful.
  - Harrison issues a proclamation ordering the end of civil unrest in Wyoming.

=== August 1892 ===
- August 1 – The Eight Hour Act guarantees federal employees and federal contractors workdays of no longer than eight hours.
- August 3 – Harrison vetoes a bill that would sue the federal government over land patents. He says the effects on public lands would be unpredictable.
- August 5 – The 52nd United States Congress adjourns from its first session.
- August 31 – Fears spread of a potential cholera pandemic.

=== September 1892 ===
- September 1 – Under the Marine Hospital Act, foreign ships arriving in the United States are required to quarantine for twenty days to prevent the spread of cholera.
- September 12 – Harrison stops campaigning for the presidential election as his wife Caroline Harrison suffers from an increasingly severe illness.
- September 21 – Harrison and his wife return to the White House.

=== October 1892 ===
- October 25 – Caroline Harrison dies of tuberculosis.
- October 28 – The United States signs a copyright treaty with Italy.

=== November 1892 ===
- November 8 – The 1892 United States elections take place. Grover Cleveland defeats Harrison in the presidential election with 277 electoral votes to Harrison's 145.
- November 25 – The United States signs a treaty with Mexico on the right to pursue Indians across national borders.
- November 30 – The Homestead strike ends. Carnegie Steel Company remains unharmed, and the union is effectively destroyed.

=== December 1892 ===
- December 5 – The 52nd United States Congress convenes for its second session.
- December 6 – Harrison delivers the 1892 State of the Union Address. He asks for an undersea cable to Hawaii, the expansion of quarantines in American ports, and reform of confirming election results.
- December 24 – Harrison issues a proclamation creating the a nature reserve in Afognak Island.

== 1893 ==
=== January 1893 ===
- January 4 – Harrison pardons Mormons who illegally practice polygamy.
- January 14
  - Queen Liliʻuokalani of the Hawaiian Kingdom dissolves the national legislature after her proposed constitution is rejected.
  - The United States signs an extradition treaty with Sweden.
- January 15 – Sanford B. Dole forms the Provisional Government of Hawaii in opposition to Queen Liliʻuokalani.
- January 16 – The United States sends 180 marines to protect American citizens in Hawaii on the order of American minister to Hawaii John L. Stevens.
- January 17 – Queen Liliʻuokalani is overthrown and the provisional government takes control of Hawaii.
- January 18 – Harrison issues a proclamation acknowledging the death of former president Rutherford B. Hayes.

=== February 1893 ===
- February 2 – Harrison nominates Howell E. Jackson to the Supreme Court.
- February 8 – Congress certifies Grover Cleveland's election as president.
- February 15 – Harrison asks the Senate to ratify the annexation of Hawaii.
- February 18 – Howell E. Jackson is confirmed to the Supreme Court.
- February 21 – Harrison delivers a report on the International Monetary and Economic Conferences to Congress.
- February 23
  - John W. Foster ends his tenure as secretary of state.
  - February 23 – Harrison nominates Benton Hanchett to the U.S. Circuit Court for the Sixth Circuit, but the nomination is unsuccessful.
- February 27 – Harrison vetoes a bill that would organize district attorneys and marshals in Alabama.

=== March 1893 ===
- March 3
  - Congress overrides Harrison's veto of a bill that would organize district attorneys and marshals in Alabama in the only instance of a veto by Harrison being overridden.
  - The 52nd United States Congress adjourns from its second session.
- March 4 – Harrison's presidency ends and Grover Cleveland is inaugurated as the twenty-fourth president of the United States.

== Works cited ==
- Bevans, Charles I. (1968). Treaties and Other International Agreements of the United States of America, 1776-1949. United States Department of State.
