= Presidency of Benjamin Harrison =

U.S. presidential administration from 1889 to 1893

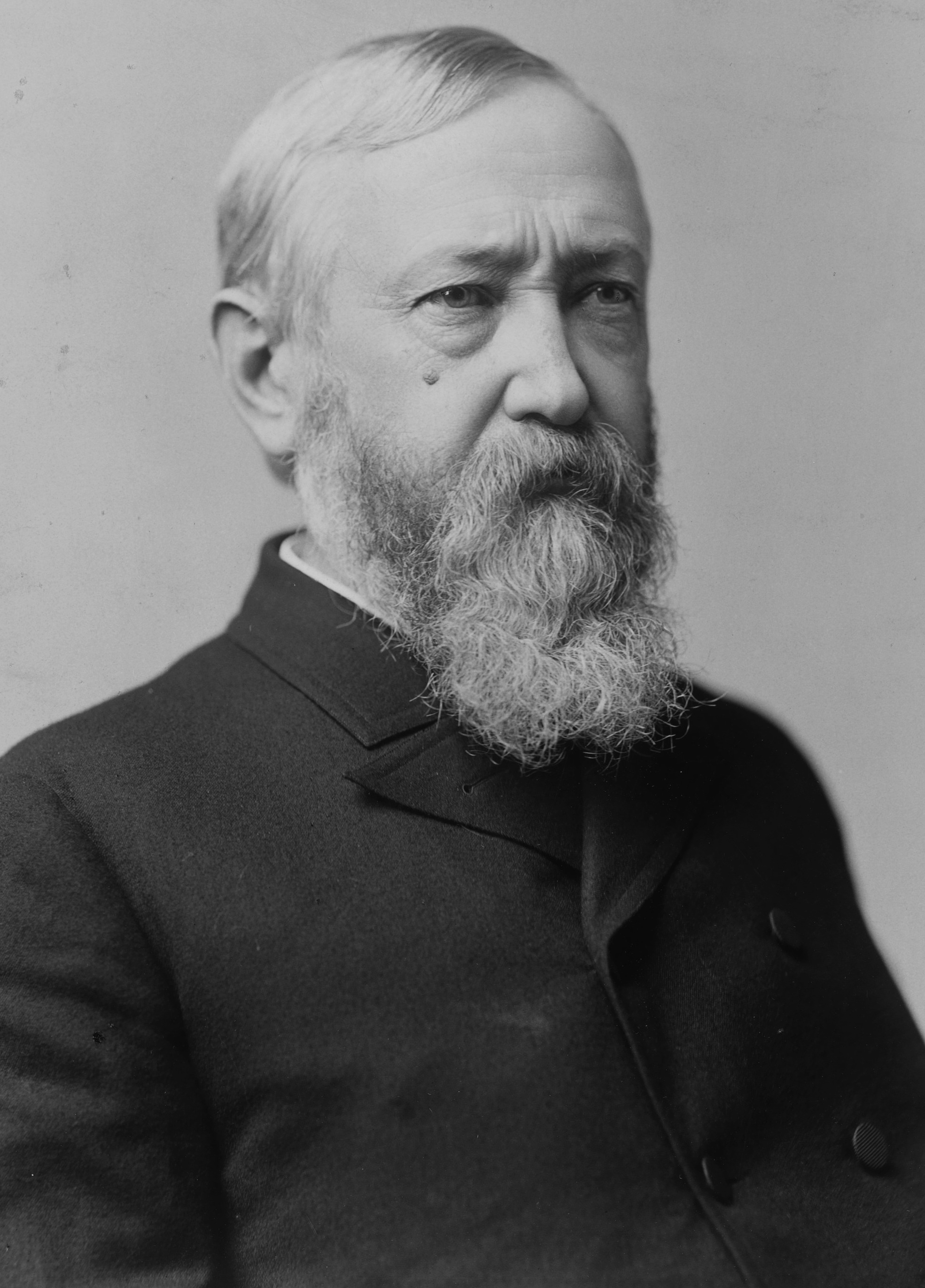
- Presidency of Benjamin Harrison; March 4, 1889 – March 4, 1893
- Vice President: Levi P. Morton
- Cabinet: See list
- Party: Republican
- Election: 1888
- Seat: White House
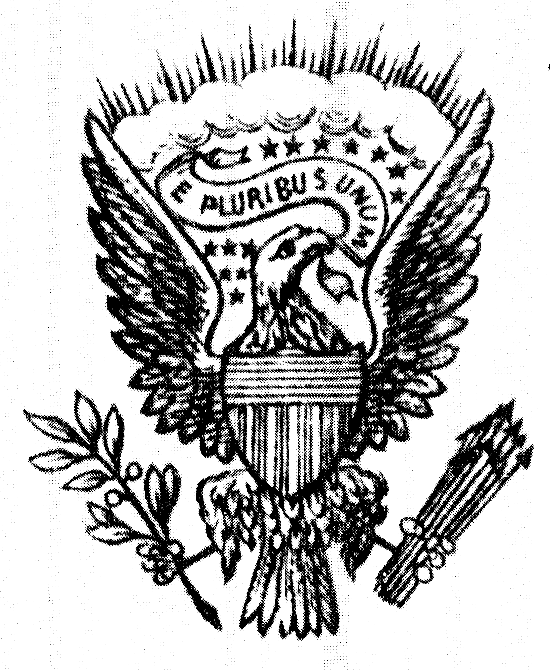
- Presidential coat of arms (1877–1913)

Benjamin Harrison's tenure as the president of the United States began on March 4, 1889, when he was inaugurated as the nation's 23rd president, and ended on March 4, 1893. Harrison, a Republican from Indiana, took office following his victory over Democratic incumbent President Grover Cleveland in the 1888 presidential election. His presidency ended following his re-election defeat in the 1892 presidential election to Cleveland, and became the first U.S. president to be succeeded in office by his predecessor.

Harrison and the Republican-controlled 51st United States Congress (derided by Democrats as the "Billion Dollar Congress") enacted the most ambitious domestic agenda of the late-nineteenth century. Hallmarks of his administration include the McKinley Tariff, which imposed historic protective trade rates, and the Sherman Antitrust Act, which empowered the federal government to investigate and prosecute trusts. Due in large part to surplus revenues from the tariffs, federal spending reached one billion dollars for the first time during his term. Harrison facilitated the creation of the National Forests through an amendment to the General Revision Act (1891), and substantially strengthened and modernized the United States Navy. He proposed, in vain, federal education funding as well as voting rights enforcement for African Americans in the South. Harrison's presidency saw the addition of six new states, more than any other president. In foreign affairs, Harrison vigorously promoted American exports, sought tariff reciprocity in Latin America, and worked to increase U.S. influence across the Pacific.

== Election of 1888 ==
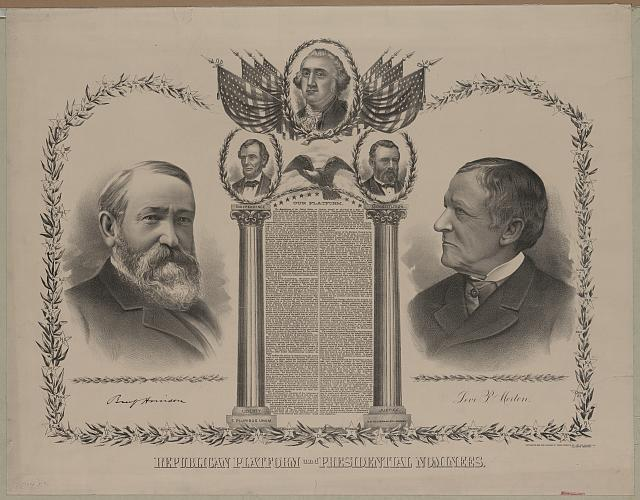
Harrison–Morton campaign poster

The initial favorite for the Republican nomination in the 1888 presidential election was James G. Blaine, the party's nominee in the 1884 presidential election. After Blaine wrote several letters denying any interest in the nomination, his supporters divided among other candidates, with John Sherman of Ohio as the leader among them. Others, including Chauncey Depew of New York, Russell Alger of Michigan, and Walter Q. Gresham, a federal appellate judge, also sought the delegates' support at the 1888 Republican National Convention. Blaine did not publicly endorse any of the candidates as a successor; however, on March 1, 1888, he privately wrote that "the one man remaining who in my judgment can make the best one is Benjamin Harrison."

Harrison represented Indiana in the United States Senate from 1881 to 1887, but lost his 1886 bid for re-election. In February 1888, Harrison announced his candidacy for the Republican presidential nomination, declaring himself a "living and rejuvenated Republican." He placed fifth on the first ballot at the 1888 Republican convention, with Sherman in the lead; the next few ballots showed little change. The Blaine supporters shifted their support among different candidates, and when they shifted to Harrison, they found a candidate who could attract the votes of many other delegations. Harrison was nominated as the party's presidential candidate on the eighth ballot, by a count of 544 to 108 votes. Levi P. Morton of New York was chosen as his running mate.

1888 electoral vote results

Harrison's opponent in the general election was incumbent President Grover Cleveland. Harrison reprised the traditional front-porch campaign, which had been abandoned by Blaine in 1884. He received visiting delegations to Indianapolis and made more than ninety pronouncements from his home town; Cleveland made only one public campaign appearance. The Republicans campaigned in favor of protective tariffs, turning out protectionist voters in the important industrial states of the North. The election focused on the swing states of New York, New Jersey, Connecticut, and Harrison's home state of Indiana. Harrison and Cleveland split these four states, with Harrison winning in New York and Indiana. Voter turnout was 79.3%, reflecting a large interest in the campaign; nearly eleven million votes were cast. Although he received approximately 90,000 fewer popular votes than Cleveland, Harrison won the electoral vote 233 to 168. This was the third U.S. presidential election in which the winner lost the popular vote.

Although Harrison had made no political bargains, his supporters had given many pledges upon his behalf. When Boss Matthew Quay of Pennsylvania heard that Harrison ascribed his narrow victory to Providence, Quay exclaimed that Harrison would never know "how close a number of men were compelled to approach...the penitentiary to make him president." In the concurrent congressional elections, the Republicans increased their membership in the House of Representatives by nineteen seats, winning control of the chamber. The party also retained control of the Senate, giving one party unified control of Congress and the presidency for the first time since the 1874 elections. The Republican sweep allowed Harrison to pursue an ambitious legislative agenda in the resulting 51st Congress.

== Inauguration ==
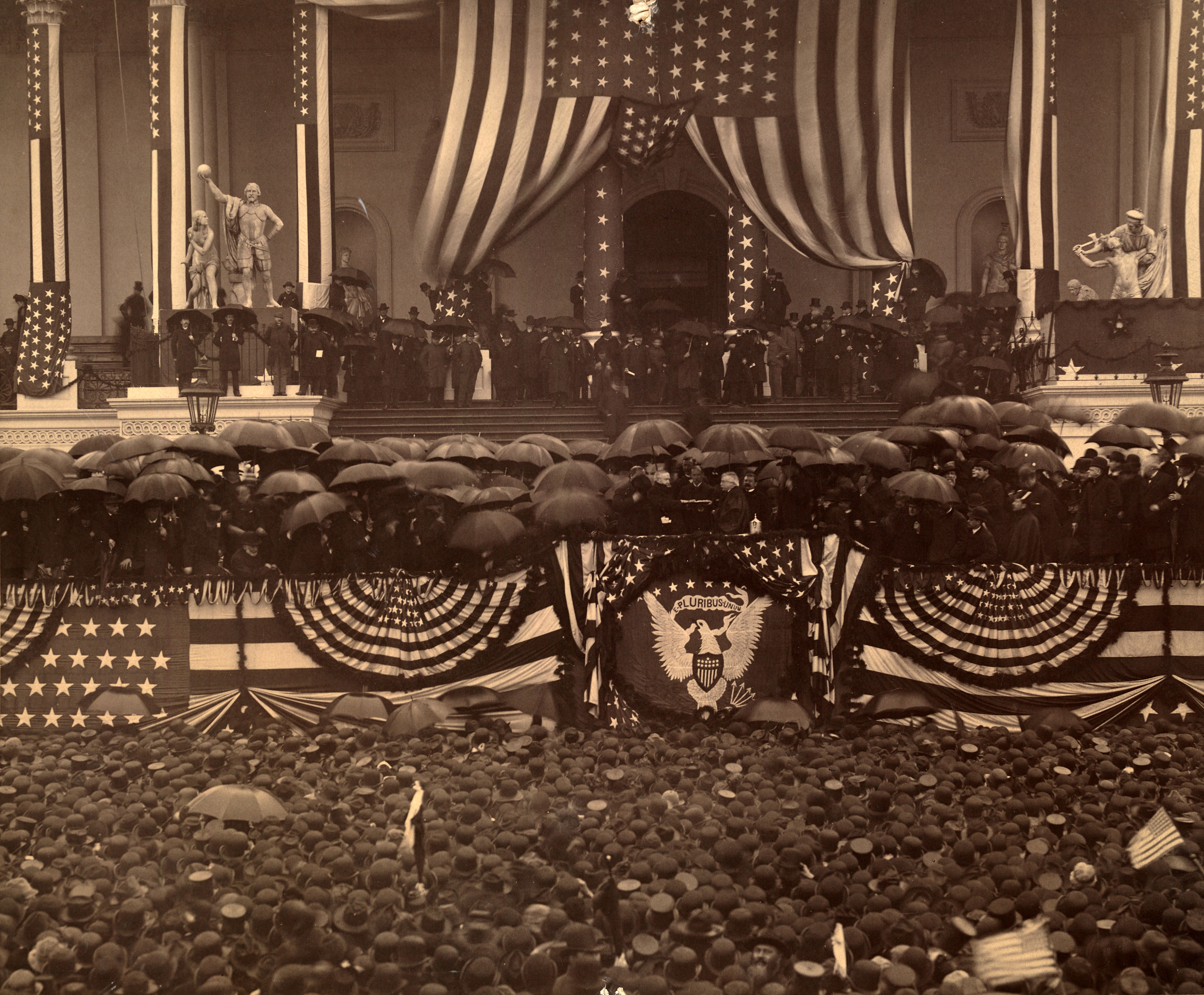
Inauguration of Benjamin Harrison, March 4, 1889. Cleveland held Harrison's umbrella

Harrison was sworn into office on March 4, 1889, by Chief Justice Melville Fuller. At 5' 6" tall, he was only slightly taller than James Madison, the shortest president, but much heavier; he was also the fourth (and last) president to sport a full beard. Harrison's inauguration ceremony took place during a rainstorm in Washington D.C. Outgoing President Grover Cleveland attended the ceremony and held an umbrella over Harrison's head as he took the oath of office. Harrison's speech was brief – half as long as that of his grandfather, William Henry Harrison, whose speech holds the record for the longest inaugural address of a U.S. president.

In his speech, Benjamin Harrison credited the nation's growth to the influences of education and religion, urged the cotton states and mining territories to attain the industrial proportions of the eastern states, and promised a protective tariff. Concerning commerce, he said, "If our great corporations would more scrupulously observe their legal obligations and duties, they would have less call to complain of the limitations of their rights or of interference with their operations." He called for the regulation of trusts, safety laws for railroad employees, aid to education, and funding for internal improvements. Harrison also urged early statehood for the territories and advocated pensions for veterans, a statement that was met with enthusiastic applause. In foreign affairs, Harrison reaffirmed the Monroe Doctrine as a mainstay of foreign policy, while urging modernization of the Navy. He also gave his commitment to international peace through noninterference in the affairs of foreign governments.

== Administration ==
=== Cabinet ===
==== Appointments ====
Harrison cabinet
Office	Name	Term
President	Benjamin Harrison	1889–1893
Vice President	Levi P. Morton	1889–1893
Secretary of State	James G. Blaine	1889–1892
John W. Foster	1892–1893
Secretary of the Treasury	William Windom	1889–1891
Charles Foster	1891–1893
Secretary of War	Redfield Proctor	1889–1891
Stephen B. Elkins	1891–1893
Attorney General	William H. H. Miller	1889–1893
Postmaster General	John Wanamaker	1889–1893
Secretary of the Navy	Benjamin F. Tracy	1889–1893
Secretary of the Interior	John Willock Noble	1889–1893
Secretary of Agriculture	Jeremiah M. Rusk	1889–1893

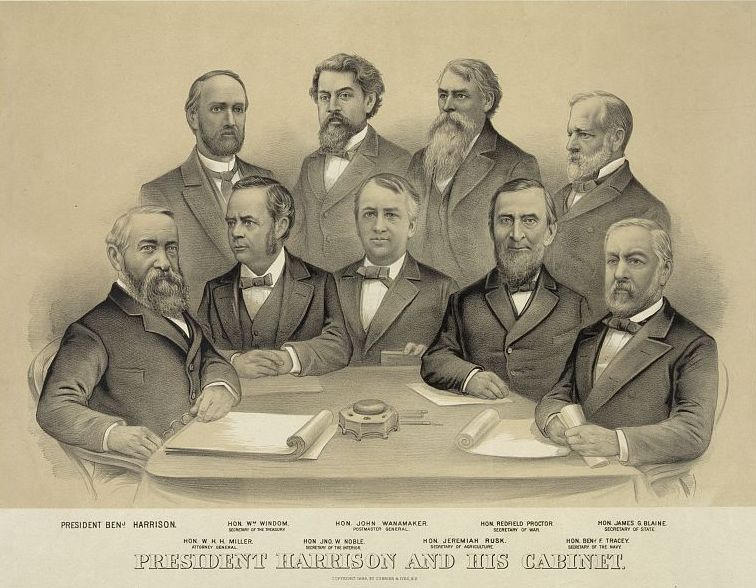
Harrison's cabinet in 1889. Front row (left to right): Harrison, William Windom, John Wanamaker, Redfield Proctor, James G. Blaine. Back row (left to right): William H. H. Miller, John W. Noble, Jeremiah M. Rusk, Benjamin F. Tracy.

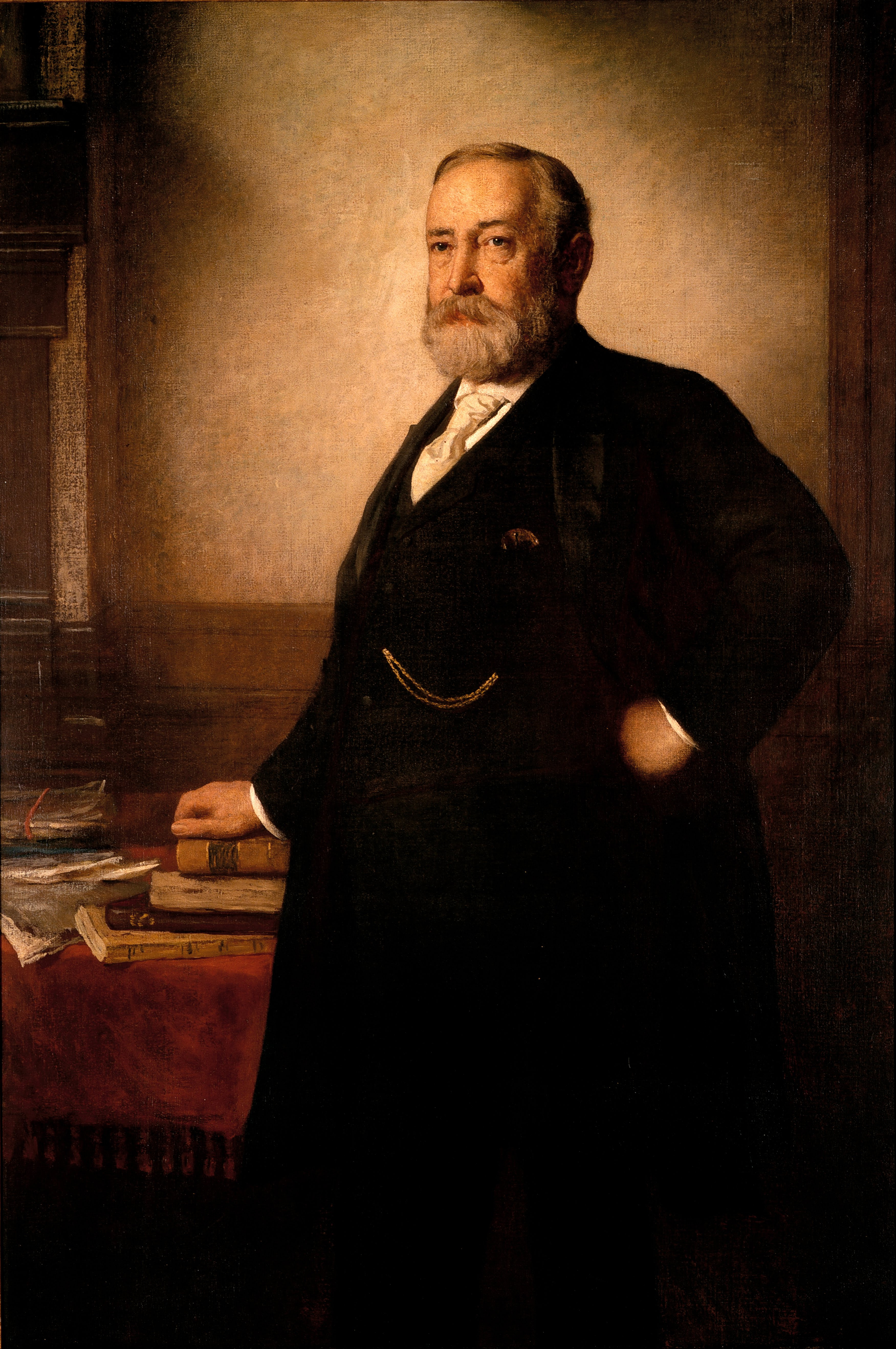
Oil painting of Benjamin Harrison, painted in 1895 by Eastman Johnson

Harrison's cabinet choices alienated pivotal Republican operatives from New York to Pennsylvania to Iowa and prematurely compromised his political power and future. Senator Shelby Cullom's described Harrison's steadfast aversion to the use of federal positions for patronage, stating, "I suppose Harrison treated me as well as he did any other Senator; but whenever he did anything for me, it was done so ungraciously that the concession tended to anger rather than please." Harrison began the process of forming a cabinet by choosing to delay the nomination of James G. Blaine as Secretary of State. Harrison felt that Blaine had, as President James Garfield's Secretary of State-designate, held too much power in choosing the personnel of the Garfield administration, and he sought to avoid a similar scenario. Despite this early snub, Blaine and Harrison found common ground on most major policy issues. Blaine played a major role in Harrison's administration, though Harrison made most of the major policy decisions in foreign affairs. Blaine served in the cabinet until 1892, when he resigned due to poor health. He was replaced by John W. Foster, an experienced diplomat.

For the important position of Secretary of the Treasury, Harrison rejected Thomas C. Platt and Warner Miller, two powerful New York Republicans who fought for control of their state party. He instead selected William Windom, a native Midwesterner who lived in New York and who had served in the same position under Garfield. New York Republicans were also represented in the cabinet by Benjamin F. Tracy, who was appointed Secretary of the Navy. Former Governor Charles Foster of Ohio succeeded Windom upon the latter's death in 1891. Postmaster General John Wanamaker represented Pennsylvania Republicans, many of whom were disappointed that their state party did not receive a more prominent cabinet seat. For the position of Secretary of the Agriculture, which had been established in the waning days of Cleveland's term, Harrison appointed Wisconsin Governor Jeremiah M. Rusk. John Noble, a railroad attorney with a reputation for incorruptibility, became the head of the scandal-plagued Department of the Interior. Redfield Proctor, a native of Vermont who had played a key role in Harrison's nomination, was rewarded with the position of Secretary of War. Proctor resigned in 1891 to take a Senate seat, at which point he was replaced by Stephen B. Elkins. Harrison's close friend and former law partner, William H. H. Miller, became Attorney General. Harrison's normal schedule provided for two full cabinet meetings per week, as well as separate weekly one-on-one meetings with each cabinet member.

== Judicial appointments ==
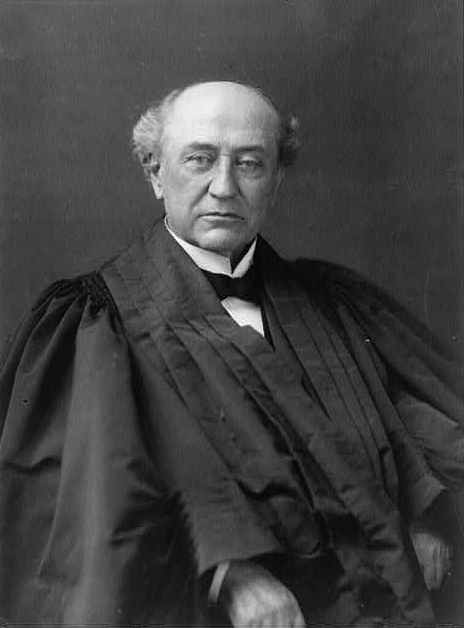
Harrison appointed four Supreme Court justices, including David Josiah Brewer.

Harrison appointed four justices to the Supreme Court of the United States. The first was David Josiah Brewer, a judge on the Court of Appeals for the Eighth Circuit. Brewer, the nephew of Associate Justice Field, had previously been considered for a cabinet position. Shortly after Brewer's nomination, Justice Matthews died, creating another vacancy. Harrison had considered Henry Billings Brown, a Michigan judge and admiralty law expert, for the first vacancy and now nominated him for the second. For the third vacancy, which arose in 1892, Harrison nominated George Shiras. Shiras's appointment was somewhat controversial because his age—sixty—was older than usual for a newly appointed Justice, but he won Senate approval. Finally, at the end of his term, Harrison nominated Howell Edmunds Jackson to replace Justice Lamar, who died in January 1893. Harrison knew the incoming Senate would be controlled by Democrats, so he selected Jackson, a respected Tennessee Democrat with whom he was friendly, to ensure his nominee would not be rejected. Jackson's nomination was indeed successful, but he died after only two years on the Court. The other Justices appointed by Harrison served past 1900, with Brewer the last to leave the Court, doing so upon his death in 1910.

Harrison signed the Judiciary Act of 1891, which abolished the United States circuit courts and created the United States courts of appeal. The act ended the practice of Supreme Court Justices "riding circuit." The end of that custom combined with the creation of permanent intermediate appellate courts significantly reduced the workload faced by the Supreme Court. Harrison appointed ten judges to the courts of appeal, two judges to the circuit courts, and 26 judges to the district courts. Because Harrison was in office when Congress eliminated the circuit courts in favor of the courts of appeals, he and Grover Cleveland were the only two presidents to have appointed judges to both bodies.

== States admitted to the Union ==
More states were admitted during Harrison's presidency than any other. When Harrison took office, no new states had been admitted to the Union in more than a decade, owing to Congressional Democrats' reluctance to admit states that they believed would send Republican members. Seeking to bolster the party's majorities in the Senate, Republicans pushed bills admitting new states through the lame duck session of the 50th Congress. North Dakota, South Dakota, Montana, and Washington all became states in November 1889. The following July, Idaho and Wyoming were also admitted. These states collectively sent twelve Republican senators to the 51st Congress.

== Economic policy ==
=== Antitrust law ===
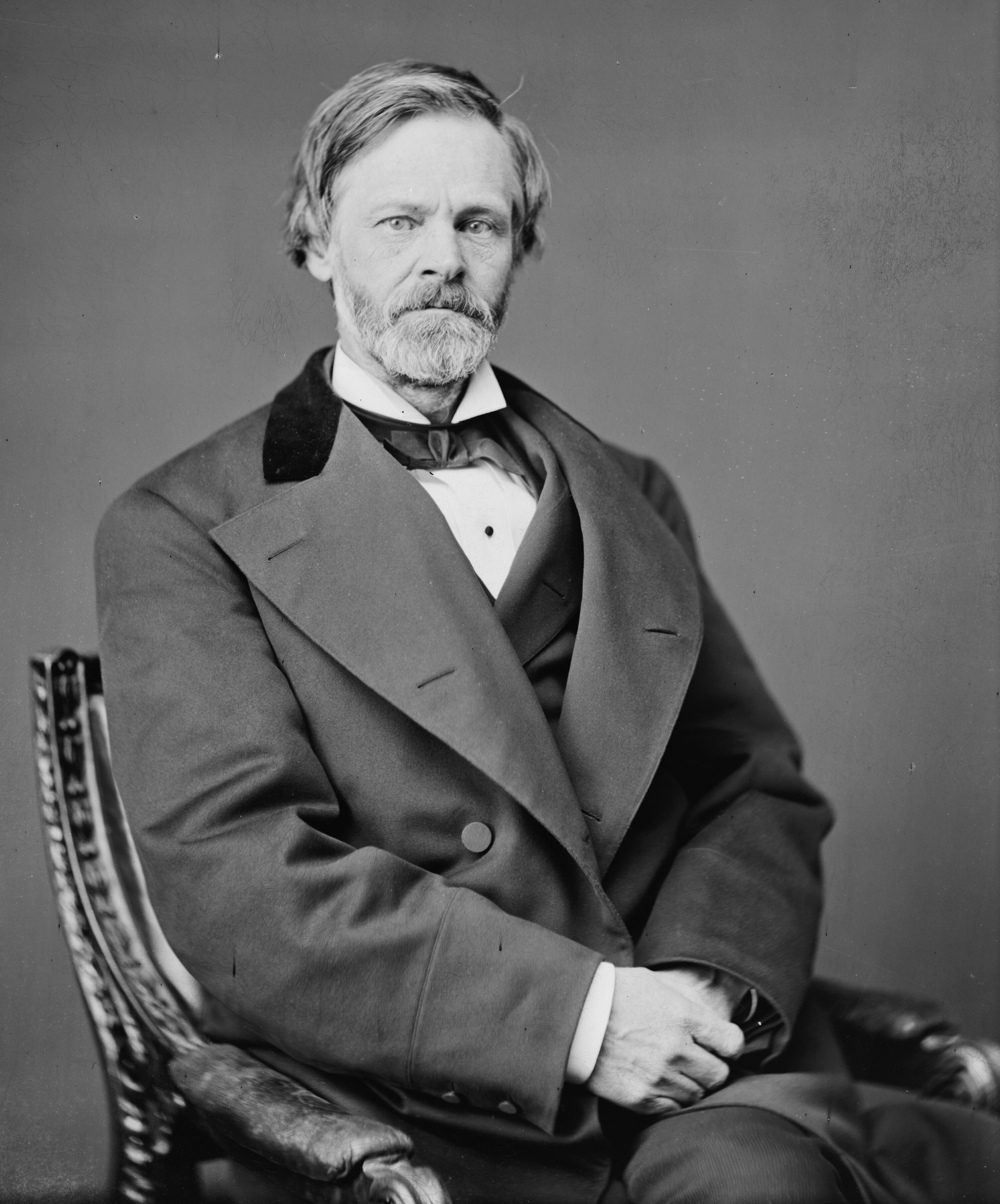
Senator John Sherman worked closely with Harrison, writing bills regulating monopolies and monetary policy.

Members of both parties were concerned with the growth and power of trusts, which were business arrangements in which several competing companies combined to form one jointly-managed operation. Since the founding of Standard Oil in 1879, trusts created monopolies in several areas of production, including steel, sugar, whiskey, and tobacco. The Harrison administration worked with congressional leaders to propose and pass the Sherman Antitrust Act, one of the first major acts of the 51st United States Congress. The act specified that every "combination in the form of trust...in restraint of trade or commerce...is hereby declared to be illegal."

Along with the Interstate Commerce Act of 1887, the Sherman Act represented one of the first major federal steps taken by the federal government to regulate the economy. Harrison approved of the law and its intent, but his administration was not particularly vigorous in enforcing it. The Department of Justice was generally too understaffed to pursue complex antitrust cases, and enforcement was further hampered by the vague language of the act and narrow interpretation of judges. Despite these hindrances, the government successfully concluded one case during Harrison's time in office (against a Tennessee coal company), and initiated several other cases against trusts. The relatively limited enforcement powers and the Supreme Court's narrow interpretation of the law would eventually inspire passage of the Clayton Antitrust Act of 1914.

=== Tariff ===
Tariffs accounted for 60 percent of federal revenue in 1889, and were a major source of political debate in the Gilded Age. Along with a stable currency, high tariffs were the central aspect of Harrison's economic policy, since he believed that they protected domestic manufacturing jobs against cheap, imported goods. The high tariff rates had created a surplus of money in the Treasury, which led many Democrats, as well as the growing Populist movement, to call for lowering them. Most Republicans, however, preferred to spend the budget surplus on internal improvements and eliminate some internal taxes. They saw their victory in the 1888 election as a mandate to raise tariff rates.

Harrison took an active role in the tariff debate, hosting dinner parties in which he would cajole members of Congress for their support of a new tariff bill. Representative William McKinley and Senator Nelson W. Aldrich introduced the McKinley Tariff, which would raise the tariff and make some rates intentionally prohibitive so as to discourage imports. At Secretary of State James Blaine's urging, Harrison attempted to make the tariff by adding reciprocity provisions, which would allow the president to reduce rates when other countries reduced their own tariffs on American exports. The reciprocity features of the bill delegated an unusually high amount of power to the president for the time, as the president was granted the power to unilaterally modify tariff rates. The tariff was removed from imported raw sugar, and sugar growers in the United States were given a two cent per pound subsidy on their production. Congress passed the bill after Republican leaders won the votes of Western senators through passage of the Sherman Antitrust Act and other concessions, and Harrison signed the McKinley Tariff into law in October 1890.

The Harrison administration negotiated more than a dozen reciprocity agreements with European and Latin American nations in an attempt to expand U.S. trade. Even with the reductions and reciprocity, the McKinley Tariff enacted the highest average rate in American history, and the spending associated with it contributed to the reputation of the "Billion-Dollar Congress".

=== Currency ===
One of the most volatile questions of the 1880s was whether the currency should be backed by gold and silver, or by gold alone. Owing to worldwide deflation in the late 19th century, a strict gold standard had resulted in reduction of incomes without the equivalent reduction in debts, pushing debtors and the poor to call for silver coinage as an inflationary measure. Because silver was worth less than its legal equivalent in gold, taxpayers paid their government bills in silver, while international creditors demanded payment in gold, resulting in a depletion of the nation's gold supply. The issue cut across party lines, with western Republicans and southern Democrats joining in the call for the free coinage of silver, and both parties' representatives in the northeast holding firm for the gold standard.

The silver coinage issue had not been much discussed in the 1888 campaign. Harrison attempted to steer a middle course between the two positions, advocating a free coinage of silver, but at its own value, not at a fixed ratio to gold. Congress did not adopt Harrison's proposal, but in July 1890, Senator Sherman won passage of the Sherman Silver Purchase Act. The Sherman Silver Purchase Act increased the amount of silver the government was required to purchase on a recurrent monthly basis to 4.5 million ounces. Believing that the bill would end the controversy over silver, Harrison signed the bill into law. The effect of the bill, however, was the increased depletion of the nation's gold supply, a problem that would persist until after Harrison left office. The bill and the silver debate also split the Republican Party, leading to the rise of the Silver Republicans, an influential bloc of Western Congressmen who backed the free coinage of silver. Many of these Silver Republicans would later join the Democratic Party.

== Domestic policy ==
=== Civil service reform and pensions ===
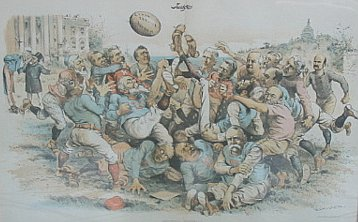
Political football

Civil service reform was a prominent issue following Harrison's election. Harrison had campaigned as a supporter of the merit system, as opposed to the spoils system. Although the passage of the 1883 Pendleton Act had decreased the role of patronage in assigning government positions, Harrison spent much of his first months in office deciding on political appointments. Congress was severely divided on civil service reform and Harrison was reluctant to address the issue for fear of alienating either side. The issue became a political football of the time and was immortalized in a cartoon captioned "What can I do when both parties insist on kicking?" Harrison appointed Theodore Roosevelt and Hugh Smith Thompson, both reformers, to the Civil Service Commission, but otherwise did little to further the reform cause. Harrison largely ignored Roosevelt, who frequently called for an expansion of the merit system and complained about the administration of Postmaster General Wanamaker.

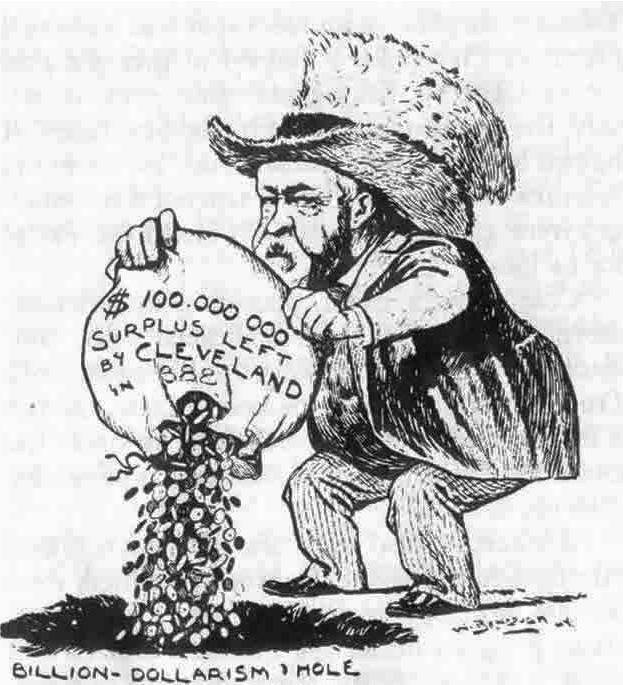
Benjamin Harrison and the Congress are portrayed as a "Billion-Dollar Congress," wasting the surplus in this cartoon from Puck.

Harrison's solution to the growing surplus in the federal treasury was to increase pensions for Civil War veterans, the great majority of whom were Republicans. He presided over the enactment of the Dependent and Disability Pension Act, a cause he had championed while in Congress. In addition to providing pensions to disabled Civil War veterans (regardless of the cause of their disability), the act depleted some of the troublesome federal budget surplus. Pension expenditures reached $135 million under Harrison, the largest expenditure of its kind to that point in American history, partly contributed to by Pension Bureau commissioner James R. Tanner's expansive interpretation of the pension laws. An investigation into the Pension Bureau by Secretary of the Interior Noble found evidence of lavish and illegal handouts under Tanner. Harrison, who privately believed that appointing Tanner had been a mistake due to his apparent loose management style and tongue, asked Tanner to resign and replaced him with Green B. Raum. Raum was also accused of accepting loan payments in return for expediting pension cases, but Harrison, having accepted a dissenting Congressional Republican investigation report that exonerated Raum, kept him in office for the rest of his administration.

=== Civil rights ===
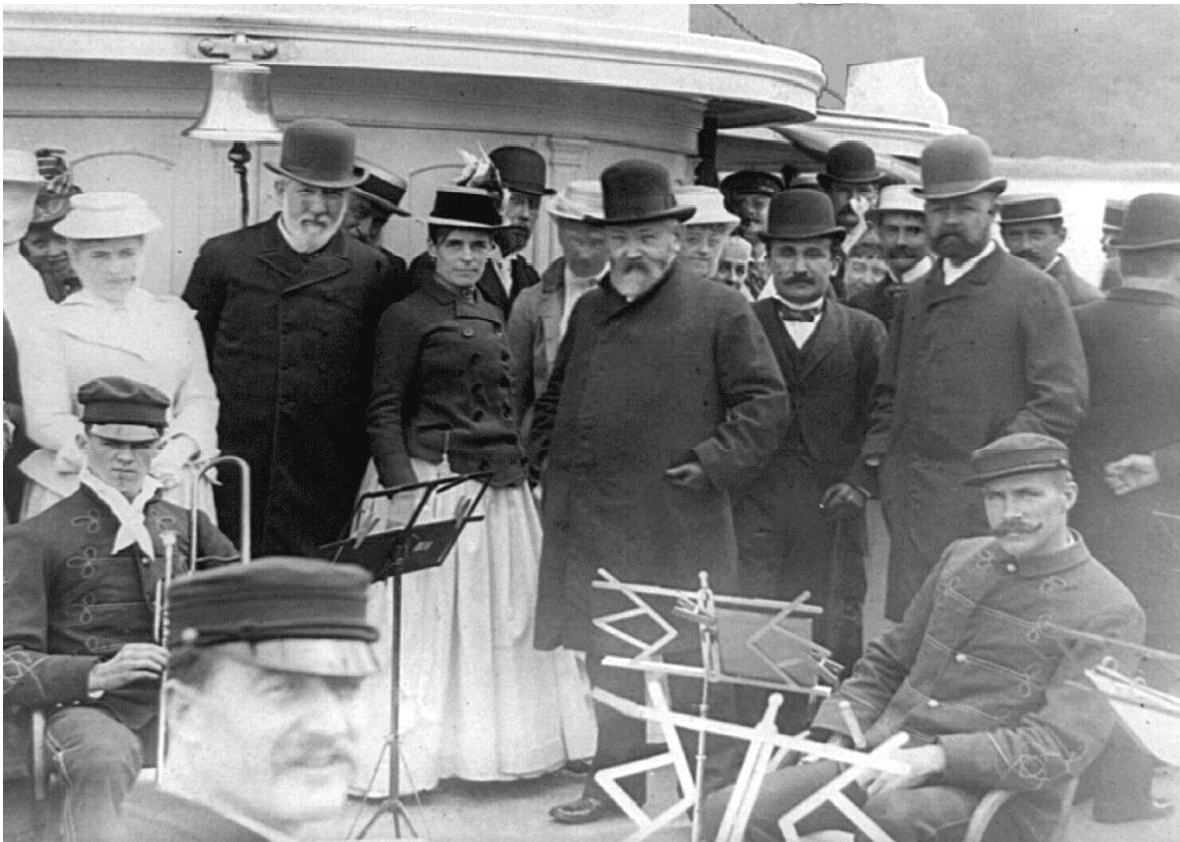
Harrison with Secretary Blaine and Representative Henry Cabot Lodge off the coast of Maine, 1889

In violation of the Fifteenth Amendment, many Southern states denied African-Americans the right to vote. Convinced that the "lily-white policy" of attempting to attract white Southerners to the Republican Party had failed, and believing that the disenfranchisement of African-American voters was immoral, Harrison endorsed the Federal Elections Bill. The bill, written by Representative Henry Cabot Lodge and Senator George Frisbie Hoar, would have provided federal oversight over elections for the U.S. House of Representatives. Southern opponents of the bill labeled it the "Force Bill," claiming that it would allow the U.S. Army to enforce voting rights, although the law did not contain such a provision. The bill passed the House in July 1890 on a largely party-line vote, but a vote on the bill was delayed in the Senate after Republican leaders chose to focus on the tariff and other priorities. In January 1891, the Senate voted 35–34 to table consideration of the Federal Elections Bill in favor of an unrelated bill backed by the Silver Republicans, and the bill never passed. While many Republicans had supported the Federal Elections Bill, it faced opposition from city-machine party bosses who feared oversight in their own wards; other Republicans were willing to sacrifice the bill to focus on other priorities. The bill represented the last significant federal attempt to protect African-American civil rights until the 1930s, and its failure allowed Southern states to pass Jim Crow laws, resulting in the near-complete disenfranchisement of Southern blacks.

Following the failure to pass the bill, Harrison continued to speak in favor of African American civil rights in addresses to Congress. Attorney General Miller conducted prosecutions for violation of voting rights in the South, but white juries often refused to convict or indict violators. He argued that if the states have authority over civil rights, then "we have a right to ask whether they are at work upon it." Harrison also supported a bill proposed by Senator Henry W. Blair, which would have granted federal funding to schools regardless of the students' races. Though similar bills had garnered strong Republican support during the 1880s, Blair's bill was defeated in the Senate in 1890 after several Republicans voted against it. Harrison also endorsed an unsuccessful constitutional amendment to overturn the Supreme Court's holding in the Civil Rights Cases, which had declared much of the Civil Rights Act of 1875 unconstitutional, but no action was taken on such an amendment.

=== National forests ===
In March 1891 Congress enacted and Harrison signed the Land Revision Act of 1891. This legislation resulted from a bipartisan desire to initiate reclamation of surplus lands that had been, up to that point, granted from the public domain, for potential settlement or use by railroad syndicates. As the law's drafting was finalized, Section 24 was added at the behest of Harrison by his Secretary of the Interior John Noble, which read as follows:

That the President of the United States may, from time to time, set apart and reserve, in any State or Territory having public land bearing forests, in any part of the public lands wholly or in part covered with timber or undergrowth, whether of commercial value or not, as public reservations, and the President shall, by public proclamation, declare the establishment of such reservations and the limits thereof.

Within a month of the enactment of this law Harrison authorized the first forest reserve, to be located on public domain adjacent to Yellowstone Park, in Wyoming. Other areas were so designated by Harrison, bringing the first forest reservations total to 22 million acres in his term. Harrison was also the first to give a prehistoric Indian Ruin, Casa Grande in Arizona, federal protection.

=== Native American policy ===
During Harrison's administration, the Lakota Sioux, previously confined to reservations in South Dakota, grew restive under the influence of Wovoka, a medicine man, who encouraged them to participate in a spiritual movement called the Ghost Dance. Many in Washington did not understand the predominantly religious nature of the Ghost Dance, and thought it was a militant movement being used to rally Native Americans against the government. In reality, however, there were only about 4,200 ghost dancers, most of whom were women, children, and the elderly. In November 1890, Harrison himself ordered troops to Pine Ridge in order to prevent "any outbreak that may put in peril the lives and homes of the settlers of the adjacent states". The arrival of troops increased tensions on both sides, and the natives felt threatened. On December 29, 1890, troops from the Seventh Cavalry clashed with the Sioux at Wounded Knee. The result was a massacre of at least 146 Sioux, including many women and children; the dead Sioux were buried in a mass grave. In reaction Harrison directed Major General Nelson A. Miles to investigate and ordered 3,500 federal troops to South Dakota; the uprising was brought to an end. Afterwards, Harrison would honor the 7th Cavalry, and 20 soldiers received medals for their role in the massacre. Wounded Knee is considered the last major American Indian battle in the 19th century. Harrison's general policy on American Indians was to encourage assimilation into white society and, despite the massacre, he believed the policy to have been generally successful. This policy, known as the allotment system and embodied in the Dawes Act, was favored by liberal reformers at the time, but eventually proved detrimental to American Indians as they sold most of their land at low prices to white speculators.

Soon after taking office, Harrison signed an appropriations bill that opened parts of Indian Territory to white settlement. The territory had been established earlier in the 19th century for the resettlement of the "Five Civilized Tribes," and portions of the territory known as the Unassigned Lands had not yet been granted to any tribe. In the Land Rush of 1889, 50,000 settlers moved into the Unassigned Lands to establish land claims. In the 1890 Oklahoma Organic Act, Oklahoma Territory was created out of the western half of Indian Territory.

=== Federal immigration control and Ellis Island ===
In one of his earliest letters Harrison said on immigration:

In the earlier years of our history public agencies to promote immigration were common. The pioneer wanted a neighbor with more friendly instincts than the Indian. Labor was scarce and fully employed. But the day of the immigration bureau has gone by. While our doors will continue open to proper immigration, we do not need to issue special invitations to the inhabitants of other countries to come to our shores or to share our citizenship. Indeed, the necessity of some inspection and limitation is obvious. We should resolutely refuse to permit foreign governments to send their paupers and criminals to our ports. We are also clearly under a duty to defend our civilization by excluding alien races whose ultimate assimilation with our people is neither possible nor desirable. The family has been the nucleus of our best immigration, and the home the most potent assimilating force in our civilization.

In 1890, President Harrison approved the assumption of federal control over immigration, ending the previous policy of leaving it to the states to regulate. Further, in 1891, he signed into law the Immigration Act of March 3, creating a federal immigration agency in the Treasury Department, establishing regulations on the type of aliens to be admitted and those for whom admission was to be barred, and funding the construction of the first federal immigration station on Ellis Island, in New York harbor, the nation's busiest port for arriving immigrants. Funding also provided for smaller immigration facilities at other port cities, including Boston, Philadelphia and Baltimore.

=== Technology and military modernization ===
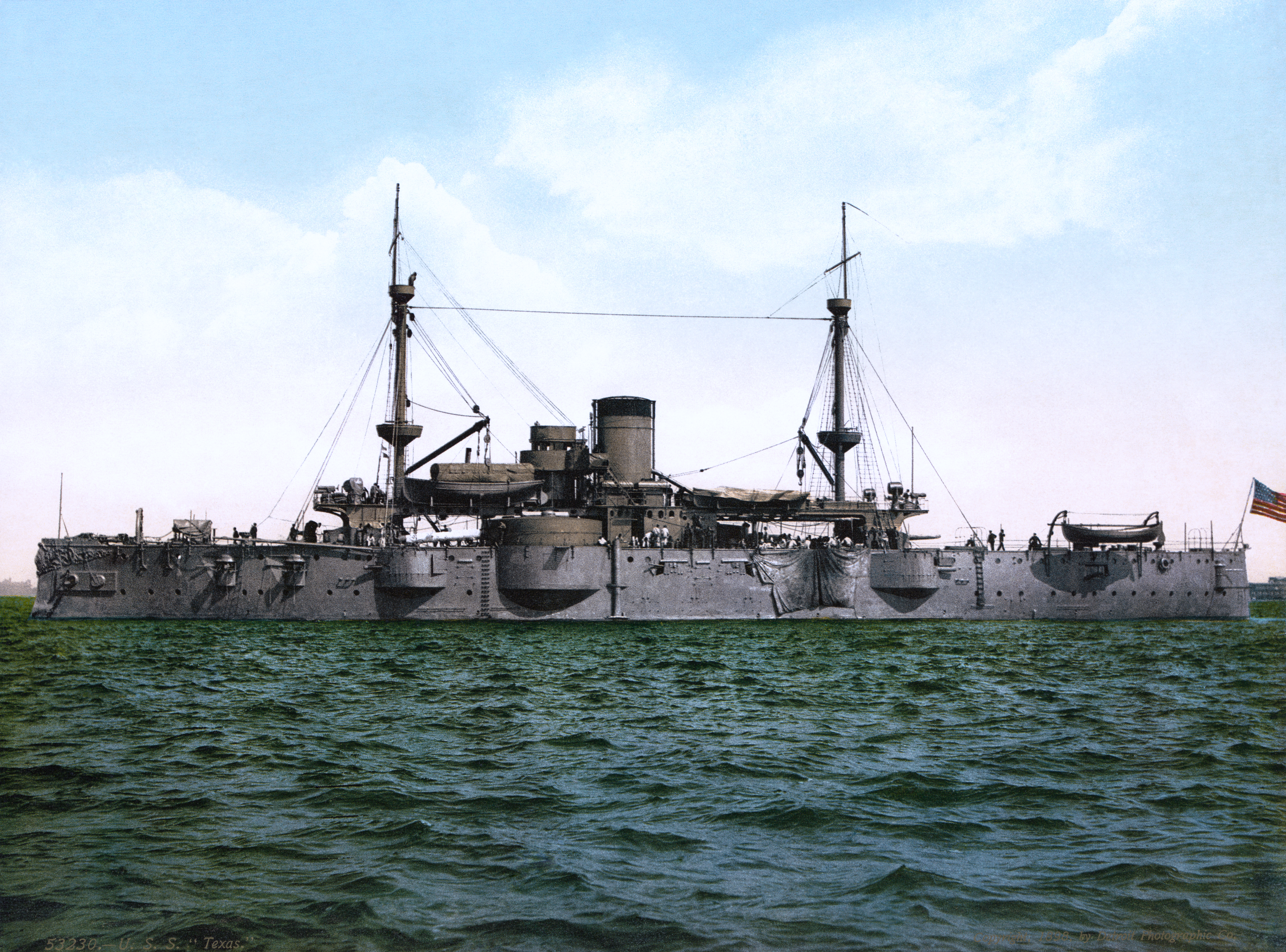
The USS Texas, America's first battleship, built in 1892

During Harrison's time in office, the United States was continuing to experience advances in science and technology, and Harrison was the earliest president whose voice is known to be preserved. That thirty-six-second recording was originally made on a wax phonograph cylinder in 1889 by Gianni Bettini. Harrison also had electricity installed in the White House for the first time by Edison General Electric Company, but he and his wife would not touch the light switches for fear of electrocution and would often go to sleep with the lights on.

The United States Navy fell into obsolescence following the Civil War, though reform and expansion had begun under President Chester A. Arthur. When Harrison took office there were only two commissioned warships in the Navy. In his inaugural address he said, "construction of a sufficient number of warships and their necessary armaments should progress as rapidly as is consistent with care and perfection." Harrison's support for naval expansion was aided and encouraged by several naval officers, who argued that the navy would be useful for protecting American trade projecting American power. In 1890, Captain Alfred Thayer Mahan published The Influence of Sea Power upon History, an influential work of naval strategy that called for naval expansion; Harrison strongly endorsed it, and Mahan was restored to his position of President of the Naval War College. Secretary of the Navy Tracy spearheaded the rapid construction of vessels, and within a year congressional approval was obtained for building of the warships Indiana, Texas, Oregon and Columbia. By 1898, with the help of the Carnegie Corporation, no less than ten modern warships, including steel hulls and greater displacements and armaments, had transformed the United States into a legitimate naval power. Seven of these had begun during the Harrison term.

The United States Army had also been largely neglected since the Civil War, despite the continuing American Indian Wars. When Harrison took office, there were roughly 28,000 officers and enlisted men, and much of the equipment was inferior to that of European armies. Secretary of War Proctor sought to institute several reforms, including an improved diet and the granting of furloughs, resulting in a decline of the desertion rate. Promotions for officers began to be granted based on the branch of service rather than on a regimental basis, and those subject to promotion were required to pass examinations. The Harrison administration also re-established the position of United States Assistant Secretary of War to serve as the second-ranking member of the War Department. Harrison's reform efforts halved the desertion rate, but otherwise the army remained in largely the same state at the end of his tenure.

=== Standardization of place names ===
By executive order, Harrison established the Board on Geographical Names in 1890. The board was tasked with standardizing the spelling of the names of communities and municipalities within the United States; most towns with apostrophes or plurals as part of their names were rewritten as singular (e.g. Weston's Mills became Weston Mills) and places that ended in "burgh" were truncated to end in "burg." In one particularly controversial case, Pittsburgh in Pennsylvania was shortened to Pittsburg, only for the decision to be reversed 20 years later after local residents continued to use the "Pittsburgh" spelling.

== Foreign policy ==
Harrison appreciated the forces of nationalism and imperialism which were inevitably pulling the United States onward into playing a more important part in world affairs as it grew rapidly in financial and economic prowess. While the ineffective diplomatic corps was still mired in patronage, the rapidly growing consular service vigorously promoted commerce abroad. In a speech in 1891, Harrison proclaimed that the United States was in a "new epoch" of trade and that the expanding navy would protect oceanic shipping and increase American influence and prestige abroad. The increasing importance of the United States in world affairs was reflected in the act of Congress in 1893 which raised the rank of the most important diplomatic representatives abroad from minister plenipotentiary to ambassador.

=== Latin America ===
Harrison and Blaine agreed on an ambitious foreign policy that emphasized commercial reciprocity with other nations. Their goal was to replace Britain as the dominant commercial power in Latin America. The First International Conference of American States met in Washington in 1889; Harrison set an aggressive agenda including customs and currency integration and named a bipartisan conference delegation led by John B. Henderson and Andrew Carnegie. Though the conference failed to achieve any diplomatic breakthrough, it did succeed in establishing an information center that became the Pan American Union. In response to the diplomatic bust, Harrison and Blaine pivoted diplomatically and initiated a crusade for tariff reciprocity with Latin American nations; the Harrison administration concluded eight reciprocity treaties among these countries. The Harrison administration did not pursue reciprocity with Canada, as Harrison and Blaine believed that Canada was an integral part of the British economic bloc and could never be integrated into a trade system dominated by the U.S. On another front, Harrison sent Frederick Douglass as ambassador to Haiti, but failed in his attempts to establish a naval base there.

=== Samoa ===
By 1889, the United States, Great Britain and Germany were locked in an escalating dispute over control of the Samoan Islands in the Pacific. The dispute had started in 1887 when the Germans tried to establish control over the island chain and President Cleveland responded by sending three naval vessels to defend the Samoan government. American and German warships faced off but all were badly damaged by the 1889 Apia cyclone of March 15–17, 1889. Seeking to improve relations with Britain and the United States, German Chancellor Otto Von Bismarck convened a conference in Berlin. Delegates from the three countries agreed to the Treaty of Berlin, which established a three-power protectorate in Samoa. Historian George H. Ryden argues that Harrison played a key role in determining the status of this Pacific outpost by taking a firm stand on every aspect of Samoa conference negotiations; this included selection of the local ruler, refusal to allow an indemnity for Germany, as well as the establishment of the three-power protectorate, a first for the U.S. A serious long-term result was an American distrust of Germany's foreign policy after Bismarck was forced out in 1890.

=== European embargo of U.S. pork ===
In response to vague reports of trichinosis that supposedly originated with American hogs, Germany and nine other European countries imposed a ban on importation of United States pork in the 1880s. At issue was over 1.3 billion pounds of pork products in 1880 with a value of $100 million annually. Harrison persuaded Congress to enact the Meat Inspection Act of 1890 to guarantee the quality of the export product, and ordered Agriculture Secretary Jeremiah McLain Rusk to threaten Germany with retaliation by initiating an embargo against Germany's popular beet sugar. That proved decisive, and in September 1891 Germany relented; other nations soon followed.

=== Crises in Aleutian Islands and Chile ===
The first international crisis Harrison faced arose from disputed fishing rights on the Alaskan coast. After Canada claimed fishing and sealing rights around many of the Aleutian Islands, the U.S. Navy seized several Canadian ships. In 1891, the administration began negotiations with the British that would eventually lead to a compromise over fishing rights after international arbitration, with the British government paying compensation in 1898.

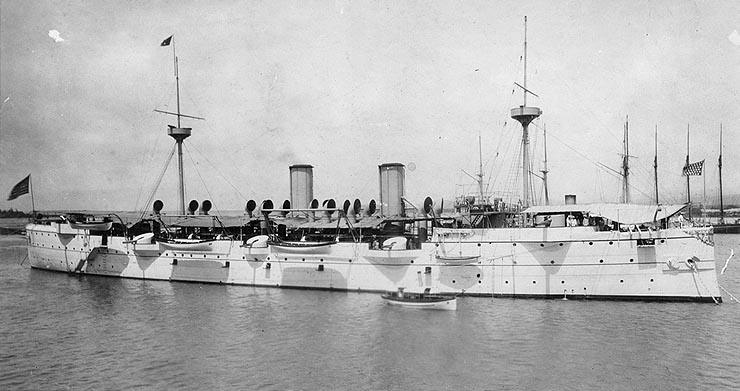
Attack on sailors from the USS Baltimore spawned the 1891 Chilean crisis.

In 1891, a new diplomatic crisis, known as the Baltimore Crisis, emerged in Chile. The American minister to Chile, Patrick Egan, granted asylum to Chileans who were seeking refuge during the 1891 Chilean Civil War. Egan, previously a militant Irish immigrant to the U.S., was motivated by a personal desire to thwart Great Britain's influence in Chile. The crisis began in earnest when sailors from the USS Baltimore took shore leave in Valparaíso and a fight ensued, resulting in the deaths of two American sailors and the arrest of three dozen others. The Baltimore's captain, Winfield Schley, based on the nature of the sailors' wounds, insisted the sailors had been bayonet-attacked by Chilean police without provocation. With Blaine incapacitated, Harrison drafted a demand for reparations. The Chilean Minister of Foreign Affairs replied that Harrison's message was "erroneous or deliberately incorrect," and said that the Chilean government was treating the affair the same as any other criminal matter.

Tensions increased to the brink of war – Harrison threatened to break off diplomatic relations unless the United States received a suitable apology, and said the situation required "grave and patriotic consideration". The president also remarked, "If the dignity as well as the prestige and influence of the United States are not to be wholly sacrificed, we must protect those who in foreign ports display the flag or wear the colors." A recuperated Blaine made brief conciliatory overtures to the Chilean government which had no support in the administration; he then reversed course and joined the chorus for unconditional concessions and apology by the Chileans. The Chileans ultimately obliged, and war was averted. Theodore Roosevelt later applauded Harrison for his use of the "big stick" in the matter.

=== Annexation of Hawaii ===
The United States had reached a reciprocity treaty with Hawaii in 1875, and had since then had blocked Japanese and British efforts to take control of the islands. Harrison sought to annex the country, which held a strategic position in the Pacific Ocean, and hosted a growing sugar business controlled by American settlers. Following a coup d'état against Queen Liliuokalani, the new government of Hawaii led by Sanford Dole petitioned for annexation by the United States. Harrison was interested in expanding American influence in Hawaii and in establishing a naval base at Pearl Harbor, but had not previously expressed an opinion on annexing the islands. The United States consul in Hawaii recognized the new Hawaiian government on February 1, 1893, and forwarded their proposal of annexation to Washington. With just one month left before leaving office, the administration signed the annexation treaty on February 14 and submitted it to the Senate the next day. The Senate failed to act, and President Cleveland withdrew the treaty shortly after taking office later that year.

== States admitted to the Union ==
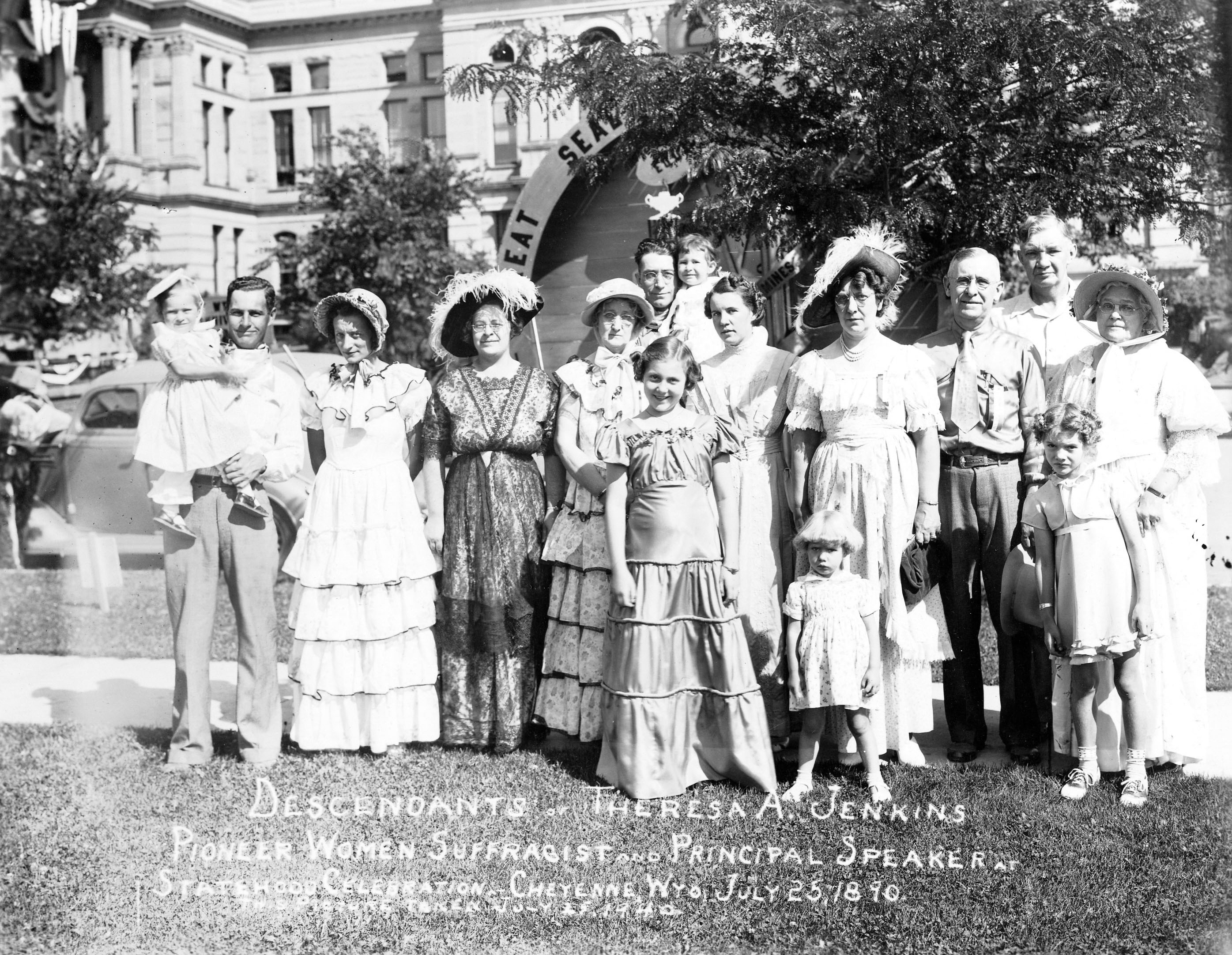
Therese A. Jenkins, Wyoming Statehood Day Celebration, 1890

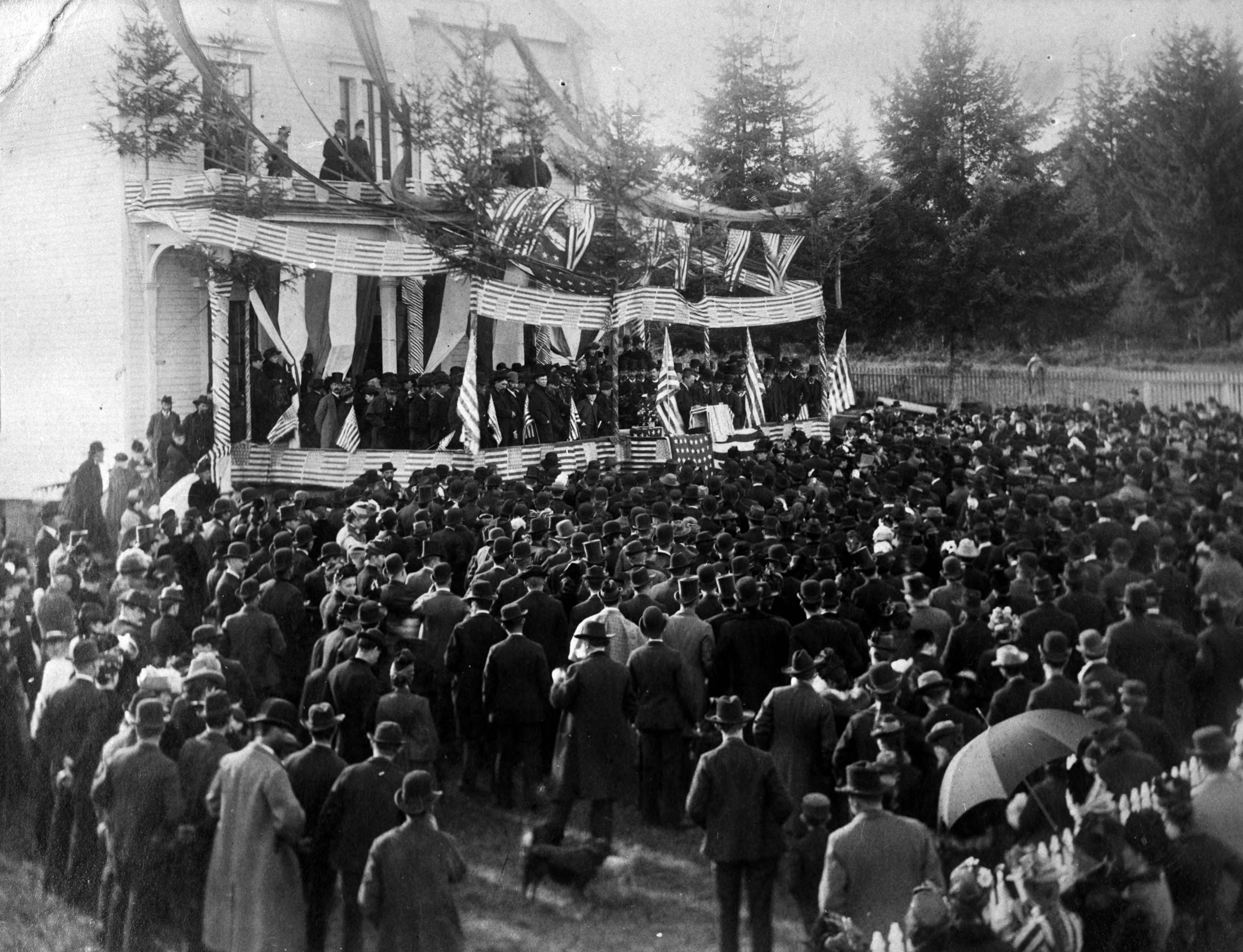
Statehood ceremony, Olympia, Washington, November 1889

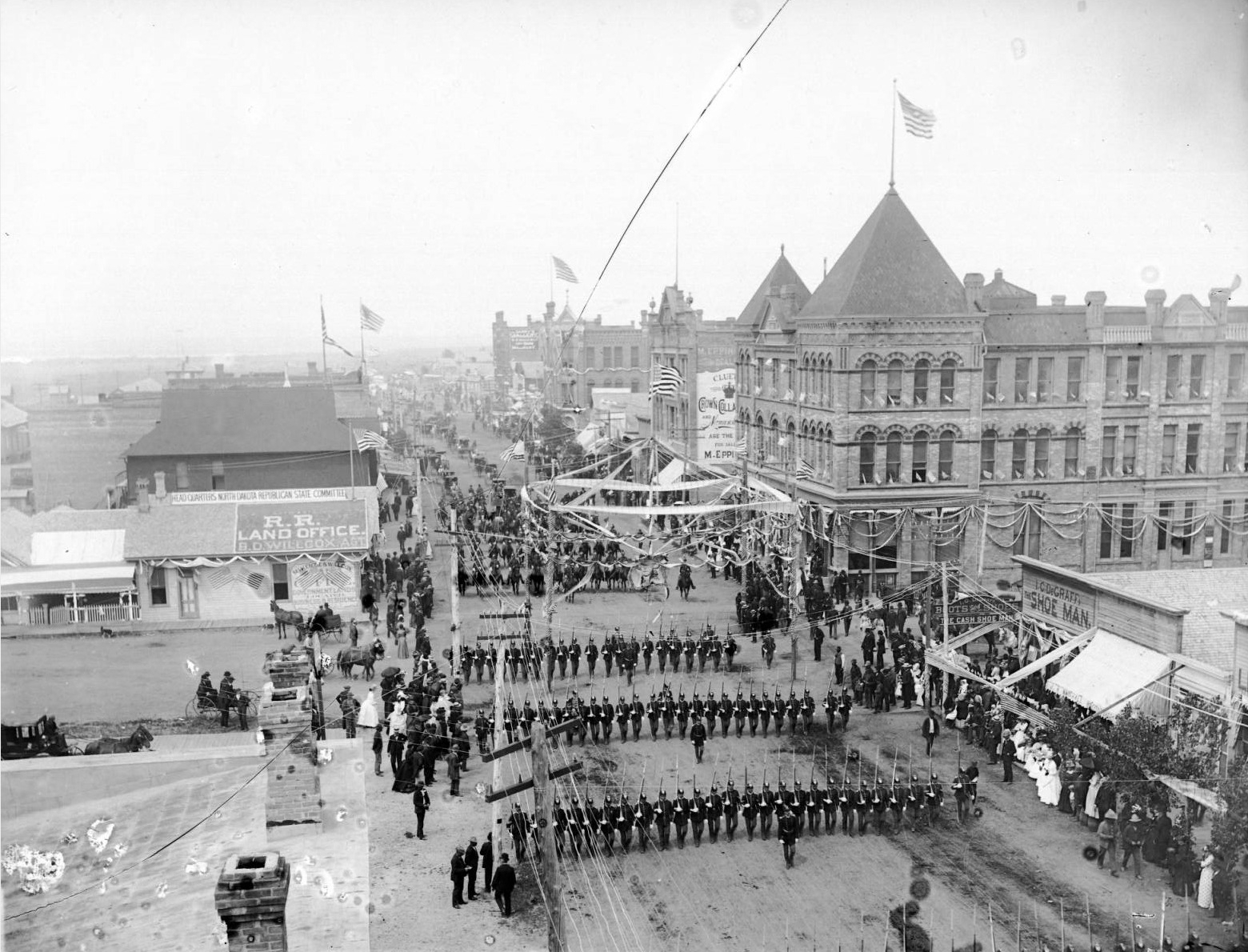
1889 Constitutional Convention Parade Bismark ND

Six new states were admitted to the Union while Harrison was in office, Harrison holds the record which before him was held by James Monroe:

- North Dakota: November 2, 1889 (39th state)
- South Dakota: November 2, 1889 (40th state)
- Montana: November 8, 1889 (41st state)
- Washington: November 11, 1889 (42nd state)
- Idaho: July 3, 1890 (43rd state)
- Wyoming: July 10, 1890 (44th state)

== Vacations and travel ==
The Harrisons made many trips out of the capital, which included speeches at most stops – including Philadelphia, New England, Indianapolis and Chicago. The president typically made his best impression speaking before large audiences, as opposed to more intimate settings. The most notable of his presidential trips was a five-week tour of the west in the spring of 1891, aboard a lavishly outfitted train. Harrison enjoyed a number of short trips out of the capital—usually for hunting—to nearby Virginia or Maryland.

During the hot Washington summers, the Harrisons took refuge in Deer Park, Maryland and Cape May Point, New Jersey. In 1890, Postmaster General Wanamaker joined with other Philadelphia devotees of the Harrisons and made a gift to them of a summer cottage at Cape May. Harrison, though appreciative, was uncomfortable with the appearance of impropriety; a month later, he paid Wanamaker $10,000 as reimbursement to the donors. Nevertheless, Harrison's opponents made the gift the subject of national ridicule, and Mrs. Harrison and the president were vigorously criticized.

== Midterm elections of 1890 ==
By the end of the 51st Congress, Harrison and the Republican-controlled allies had passed one of the most ambitious peacetime domestic legislative programs in U.S. history, but the results of the 1890 elections brought the pace of legislation to a sudden halt. Republicans lost almost 100 seats in the House of Representatives, and Democrat Charles Frederick Crisp replaced Thomas Brackett Reed as Speaker of the House. However, Republicans defended their Senate majority. The 1890 elections also saw the rise of the Populist Party, a third party consisting of farmers in the South and Midwest. The Populists emerged from the Farmers' Alliance, the Knights of Labor, and other agrarian reform movements. The party favored bimetallism, the restoration of the Greenback, the nationalization of telegraphs and railroads, tax reform, the abolition of national banks, and other policies. The party's newfound popularity was driven in part by opposition to the McKinley Tariff, which many regarded as benefiting industrialists at the expense of other groups. Many Populists in the Midwest left the Republican Party, while in the South, Populist-aligned candidates generally remained part of the Democratic Party. The split of the Republican vote allowed for the rise of Democrats in the Midwest, including future presidential candidate William Jennings Bryan of Nebraska.

== Presidential election of 1892 ==
By 1892, the treasury surplus had evaporated and the nation's economic health was worsening – precursors to the eventual Panic of 1893. Although Harrison had cooperated with Congressional Republicans on legislation, several party leaders withdrew their support due to discontent over Harrison's appointments. Matthew Quay, Thomas Platt, and Thomas Reed quietly organized the Grievance Committee, the ambition of which was to initiate a dump-Harrison offensive. Many of Harrison's detractors persisted in pushing for an incapacitated Blaine, though he announced that he was not a candidate in February 1892. Some party leaders still hoped to draft Blaine into running, and speculation increased when he resigned at the 11th hour as Secretary of State in June. At the convention in Minneapolis, Harrison prevailed on the first ballot, but encountered significant opposition, with Blaine and William McKinley both receiving votes on the lone ballot. At the convention, Vice President Morton was dropped from the ticket, and was replaced by Ambassador Whitelaw Reid.

The Democrats renominated former President Cleveland, making the 1892 election a rematch of the one four years earlier. The tariff revisions of the past four years had made imported goods so expensive that many voters had begun to favor lowering the tariff. The Populist Party held its first national convention in July, nominating a presidential ticket led by former Congressman James Weaver of Iowa. The convention adopted the Omaha Platform, which called for free silver, the reintroduction of Greenbacks, a graduated income tax, an eight-hour work day, the direct election of senators, and the nationalization of railroads. Many traditionally Republican Westerners defected to Weaver, but the party failed to galvanize its supporters in the South, with the exception of North Carolina. The effects of the suppression of the Homestead Strike and other strikes split the Republicans, as many Northern laborers defected to the Democratic Party. Cleveland's opposition to high tariffs throughout his career benefited his 1892 campaign, and Democrats attacked Republicans as the party of big business.

1892 electoral vote results

Harrison's wife Caroline began a critical struggle with tuberculosis earlier in 1892 and two weeks before the election, on October 25, she died. Her role as First Lady was filled by their daughter, Mary Harrison McKee for the balance of Harrison's presidency. Mrs. Harrison's terminal illness and the fact that both major candidates had served in the White House called for a low key campaign, and resulted in neither of them actively campaigning personally.

Cleveland ultimately won the election by 277 electoral votes to Harrison's 145, the most decisive margin in 20 years. Cleveland won 46 percent of the popular vote, beating Harrison by a margin of approximately 375,000 votes. Cleveland swept the four swing states of New York, New Jersey, Connecticut, and Indiana, and also became the first Democrat since the Civil War to carry Wisconsin and Indiana. Weaver garnered just over one million voters and twenty-two electoral votes, with most of his support coming from Western voters. In the 1892 congressional elections, Democrats retained control of the House and won a majority in the Senate. The resulting 53rd United States Congress marked the first time since the Civil War that Democrats held unified control of the presidency and both houses of Congress.

== Historical reputation ==
President Harrison and wife

As a one-term president, and one of several Republicans to serve during a short span in the late 19th century, Harrison is one of the least well-known presidents, and is perhaps best known as the only president to be the grandson of another president. A 2012 article in New York selected Harrison as the "most forgotten president." Closely scrutinized by Democrats, Harrison's reputation was largely intact when he left the White House. Following the Panic of 1893, Harrison became more popular in retirement. Historian Heather Cox Richardson writes that Harrison has largely escaped blame for the Panic of 1893, with both the contemporary general public and many later historians primarily faulting Grover Cleveland for the economic crisis, which was one of the worst recessions in U.S. history. Biographer Ray E. Boomhower writes that, in the decades after Harrison left office, historians generally ranked Harrison "in the middle of the pack and even lower" among all U.S. presidents; Boomhower argues that a contributing factor to this low standing was the fact that no biography on Harrison was published until the release of a three-volume biography by Harry J. Sievers in the 1950s and 1960s.

Harrison's legacy among historians is scant, and "general accounts of his period inaccurately treat Harrison as a cipher". Some historians have portrayed Harrison as a "lightweight puppet of party bosses", and Lillian Cunningham of the Washington Post notes that "[f]ew U.S. history books even mention Benjamin Harrison—but when they do, the write-ups are usually not too flattering." In a 2019 ranking of the worst U.S. presidents based on a compilation of rankings by scholars, U.S. News & World Report ranked Harrison as the 11th-worst president out of 45. A 2018 poll of the American Political Science Association's Presidents and Executive Politics section ranked Harrison as the 32nd best president. A 2017 C-SPAN poll of historians ranked Harrison as the 30th best president. A 2022 Siena College Research Institute poll ranked Harrison as the 34th best president out of the 45 to serve up to that time. Historian Allan B. Spetter writes,

Because of his lack of personal passion and the failure of anything truly eventful, such as a major war, during his administration, Harrison, along with every other President from the post-Reconstruction era to 1900, has been assigned to the rankings of mediocrity. He has been remembered as an average President, not among the best but certainly not among the worst.

Many recent historians have recognized the importance of the Harrison administration in influencing the foreign policy of the late nineteenth century. Historians have often given Secretary of State Blaine credit for foreign-policy initiatives but historian Charles Calhoun argues that Harrison was more responsible for the success of trade negotiations, the buildup of the steel Navy, overseas expansion, and emphasis on the American role in dominating the hemisphere through the Monroe Doctrine. The major weakness which Calhoun sees was that the public and indeed the grassroots Republican Party was not fully prepared for this onslaught of major activity. Nonetheless, the Sherman Anti-Trust Act, signed into law by Harrison, remains in effect over 120 years later, and Harrison's conservationist efforts would be continued under presidents such as Theodore Roosevelt.

Harrison's support for African American voting rights and education would be the last significant attempts to protect civil rights until the 1930s. Though he writes that Harrison had a "far better than average civil rights record," Clay S. Jenkinson of Governing criticizes Harrison's policies towards Native Americans, in particular his role in the Wounded Knee Massacre. Richardson similarly argues that the root cause of the Wounded Knee Massacre was the Harrison administration's efforts to curry favor in South Dakota through the opening of Native American lands to settlers, thereby gaining support for Republicans ahead of the 1890 Senate elections. Richardson also argues that the Harrison administration and their allies in the Republican Party deserve much of the blame for the Panic of 1893, as their demonization of Democratic policies during the 1892 election and the presidential transition period led to panic among investors, and Harrison's subsequent inaction during the early days of the economic crisis allowed it to spiral into one of the worst recessions in U.S. history.

== Works cited ==
=== Books ===
- Boomhower, Ray E. (2019). Mr. President: A Life of Benjamin Harrison. Indiana Historical Society. ISBN 9780871954282.
- Calhoun, Charles William (2005). Benjamin Harrison. Macmillan. ISBN 978-0-8050-6952-5.
- Gerhardt, Michael J. (2013). The Forgotten Presidents: Their Untold Constitutional Legacy. OUP USA. ISBN 9780199967797.
- Moore, Chieko; Hale, Hester Anne (2006). Benjamin Harrison: Centennial President. Nova Publishers. ISBN 978-1-60021-066-2.
- Smith, Robert C., ed. (2003). Encyclopedia of African-American politics. Infobase Publishing. ISBN 978-0-8160-4475-7.
- Socolofsky, Homer E.; Spetter, Allan B. (1987). The Presidency of Benjamin Harrison. University Press of Kansas. ISBN 978-0-7006-0320-6.
- Spetter, Allan B. (2016). "Benjamin Harrison". In Gormley, Ken (ed.). The Presidents and the Constitution: A Living History. New York: New York University Press Press. ISBN 9781479839902.
- Wallace, Lew (1888). Life and Public Services of Benjamin Harrison. Edgewood Publishing Co.
- White, Richard (2017). The Republic for Which It Stands: The United States During Reconstruction and the Gilded Age: 1865–1896. New York: Oxford University Press. ISBN 9780190619060.
- Williams, R. Hal (1974). "Benjamin Harrison 1889–1893". In Woodward, C. Vann (ed.). Responses of the Presidents to the Charges of Misconduct. Dell Publishing Co., Inc. pp. 191–195. ISBN 0-440-05923-2.
- Wilson, Kirt H. (2005). "The Politics of Place and Presidential Rhetoric in the United States, 1875–1901". In Rigsby, Enrique D.; Aune, James Arnt (eds.). Civil Rights Rhetoric and the American Presidency. TAMU Press. pp. 16–40. ISBN 978-1-58544-440-3.

=== Articles ===
- Batten, Donna, ed. (2010). "Gale Encyclopedia of American Law". 5 (3 ed.). Detroit: 208–209.
- Calhoun, Charles W. (Fall 1993). "Civil Religion and the Gilded Age Presidency: The Case of Benjamin Harrison". Presidential Studies Quarterly. 23 (4): 651–667. JSTOR 27551144.
- Calhoun, Charles W. (July 2002). "Reimagining the "Lost Men" of the Gilded Age: Perspectives on the Late Nineteenth Century Presidents". The Journal of the Gilded Age and Progressive Era. 1 (3): 225–257. doi:10.1017/S1537781400000244. JSTOR 25144300. S2CID 162509769.
- Gallagher, Douglas Steven. "The 'smallest mistake': explaining the failures of the Hayes and Harrison presidencies." White House Studies 2.4 (2002): 395–414.
- Graff, Henry F., ed. The Presidents: A Reference History (3rd ed. 2002) online
- Spetter, Allan. "Harrison and Blaine: Foreign Policy, 1889–1893" Indiana Magazine of History 65#3 (1969), pp. 214–227 online
- Stuart, Paul (September 1977). "United States Indian Policy: From the Dawes Act to the American Indian Policy Review Commission". Social Service Review. 51 (3): 451–463. doi:10.1086/643524. JSTOR 30015511. S2CID 143506388.
- Volwiler, A. T. "Harrison, Blaine, and American Foreign Policy, 1889-1893" Proceedings of the American Philosophical Society 79#4 1938) pp. 637–648 online
