= Political football =

Expression in politics

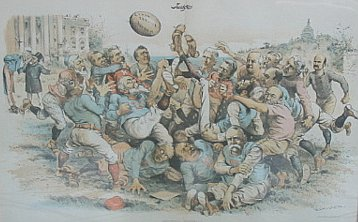
President Harrison political cartoon: What can I do when both parties insist on kicking?, Judge magazine, 1889

A political football is a topic or issue that is seized on by opposing political parties or factions and made a more political issue than it might initially seem to be. "To make a political football" [out of something] is defined in William Safire's Safire's Political Dictionary as "To thrust a social, national security, or otherwise ostensibly non-political matter into partisan politics". In 1953 the gangster Lucky Luciano complained in an interview to Safire that "I been a political football".

A less-used meaning, is a political issue that is continually debated but left unresolved. The term is often used during a political election campaign to highlight issues that candidates have not completely addressed, such as the natural environment and abortion.

== History ==
The Oxford English Dictionary has English examples of the use of "football" (the ball, not the game) in a figurative sense for something helplessly tossed around by others as early as the 16th century, for example, from about 1600: "I am the verye foote-ball of the starres". The phrase is used by the Bangor, Maine Whig and Courier in 1857. An American cartoon from the time of President Harrison in 1889 shows a clear visual illustration of the metaphor, without using the actual phrase. It is now equally popular in other English-speaking countries, where the association is naturally with association football ("soccer") or the predominant local form of football.

=== Other football metaphors in U.S. politics ===
Many other American football terms are in common use in the United States. Once a topic or issue has presented itself, the opposition will take the issue and "run with it" and "try to score points". There may be many parties in opposition to take up the topic, and sometimes run it into the ground, which at times can "backfire" and end up hurting the opposing faction. This can happen to the point of that party being seen as "fumbling" the issue. When a party or candidate ends up ignoring or putting off the issue, they are said to be "punting" it. In addition to the opponents of the politician or party using the subject as political fuel, the media may also "run with it". "Moving the goalposts" is the practice of changing the criteria of something while it is in progress (such as an investigation or a hearing) in order to offer one side an inherent advantage or disadvantage. Sometimes these matters become larger, like during an election, than anyone would have thought possible during the event itself.

Other countries also use metaphors drawn from their local sport in discussing politics, such as soccer, Australian rules football, baseball, rugby union/rugby league or cricket.

== See also ==
- Wedge issue
