= Inauguration of Benjamin Harrison =

26th United States presidential inauguration

Presidential inauguration of Benjamin Harrison
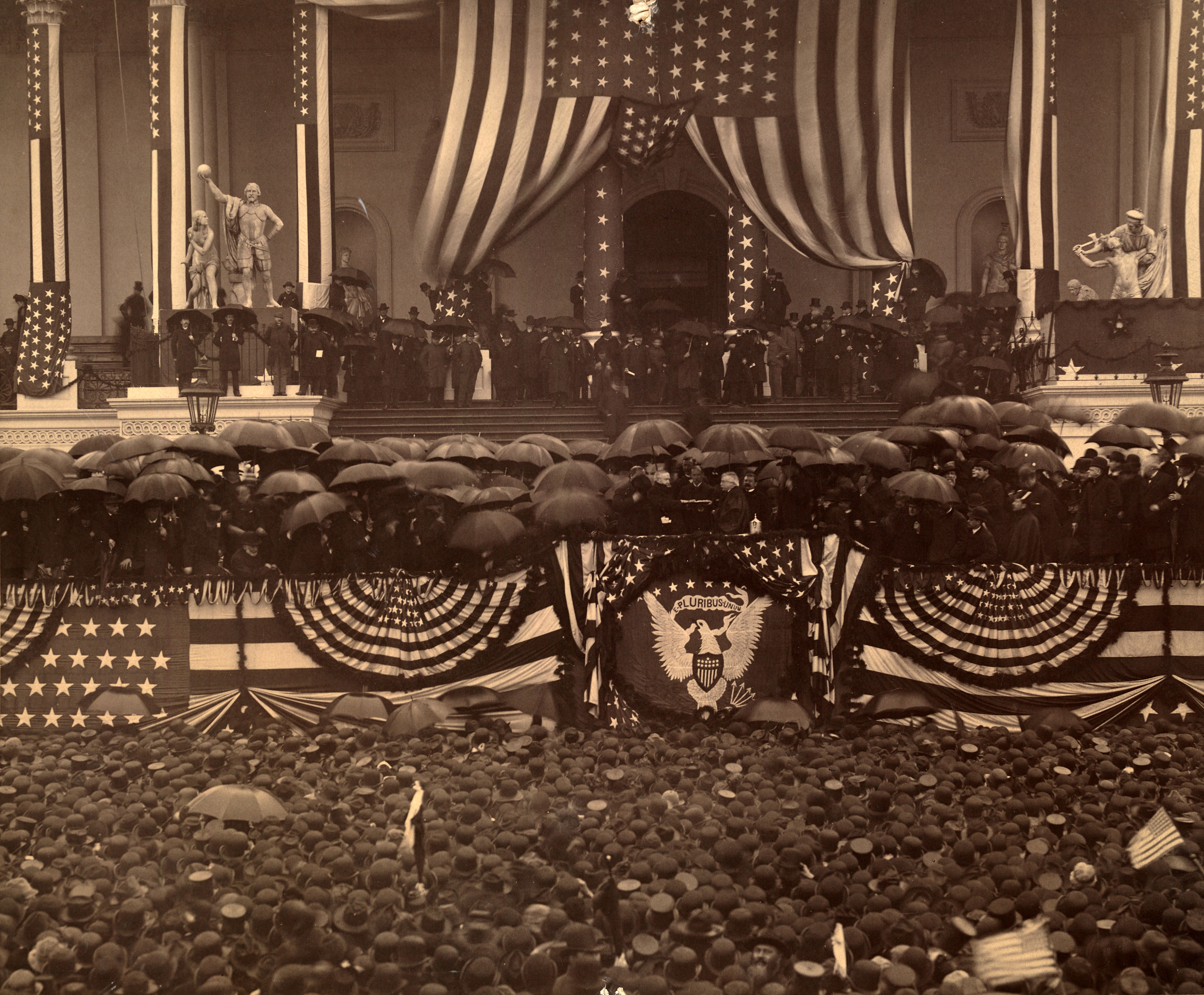
- Harrison takes the oath of office
- Date: March 4, 1889; 137 years ago
- Location: United States Capitol, Washington, D.C.
- Participants: Benjamin Harrison; 23rd president of the United States — Assuming office Melville Fuller; Chief Justice of the United States — Administering oath Levi P. Morton; 22nd vice president of the United States — Assuming office John James Ingalls; President pro tempore of the United States Senate — Administering oath

The inauguration of Benjamin Harrison as the 23rd president of the United States took place on Monday, March 4, 1889, at the East Portico of the United States Capitol in Washington, D.C. This was the 26th inauguration and marked the commencement of the only four-year term of Benjamin Harrison as president and Levi P. Morton as vice president. Chief Justice Melville Fuller administered the presidential oath of office as rain poured down.

Harrison was 5 ft 6 in (1.68 m) tall, he was only slightly taller than James Madison, the shortest president, but much heavier; he was the fourth (and last) president to sport a full beard. Harrison's inauguration ceremony took place during a rainstorm in Washington D.C. Outgoing president Grover Cleveland attended the ceremony and held an umbrella over Harrison's head as he took the oath of office.

His speech was brief – half as long as that of his grandfather, William Henry Harrison, whose speech holds the record for the longest inaugural address of a U.S. president. In his speech, Benjamin Harrison credited the nation's growth to the influences of education and religion, urged the cotton states and mining territories to attain the industrial proportions of the Eastern United States and promised a protective tariff. Concerning commerce, he said, "If our great corporations would more scrupulously observe their legal obligations and duties, they would have less call to complain of the limitations of their rights or of interference with their operations." Harrison also urged early statehood for the territories and advocated pensions for veterans, a statement that was met with enthusiastic applause. In foreign affairs, Harrison reaffirmed the Monroe Doctrine as a mainstay of foreign policy, while urging modernization of the Navy and a merchant marine force. He gave his commitment to international peace through noninterference in the affairs of foreign governments.

John Philip Sousa's Marine Band played at the Inaugural Ball inside the Pension Building with a large crowd attending. After moving into the White House, Harrison noted, quite prophetically, "There is only a door – one that is never locked – between the president's office and what are not very accurately called his private apartments. There should be an executive office building, not too far away, but wholly distinct from the dwelling house. For everyone else in the public service there is an unroofed space between the bedroom and the desk."

== Gallery ==
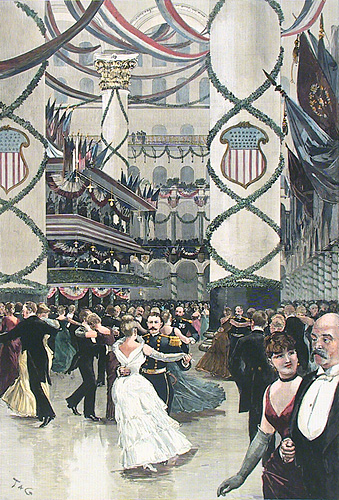
President Benjamin Harrison's inaugural ball, Washington DC 1889

President Harrison's Inauguration, 1889

== See also ==
- Presidency of Benjamin Harrison
- 1888 United States presidential election

== Sources ==
- Socolofsky, Homer E.; Spetter, Allan B. (1987). The Presidency of Benjamin Harrison. University Press of Kansas. ISBN 978-0-7006-0320-6.
