= Dependent and Disability Pension Act =

1890 act that provided pensions for all discharged and disabled veterans

- Other short titles: Dependent Pension Act of 1890 · Act of June 27, 1890
- Long title: An act granting pensions to soldiers and sailors who are incapacitated for the performance of manual labor, and providing for pensions to widows, minor children, and dependent parents.
- Enacted by: the 51st United States Congress
- Effective: June 27, 1890

Citations
- Statutes at Large: 26 Stat. 182

Legislative history
- Introduced in the Senate as S. 389 by R‑MS James Z. Georgeth on December 4, 1889; Committee consideration by Senate Committee on Pensions; Passed the Senate on March 31, 1890 (Voice vote); Passed the House on April 30, 1890 (145–56); Reported by the joint conference committee on June 1890; agreed to by the House on June 11, 1930 (145–110 (agreed to conference report)) and by the Senate on June 18, 1890 (34–18 (agreed to conference report)); Signed into law by President Benjamin Harrison on June 27, 1890

The Dependent and Disability Pension Act was passed by the United States Congress (26 Stat. 182) and signed into law by President Benjamin Harrison on June 27, 1890. The act provided pensions for all veterans who had served at least ninety days in the Union military or naval forces, were honorably discharged from service and were unable to perform manual labor, regardless of their financial situation or when the disability occurred. The bill was a source of contentious debate and only passed after Grover Cleveland had vetoed a previous version in 1887.

== Background ==
The issue of pensions for Civil War veterans had been discussed since the 1860s. In 1862, a basic system was established which granted pensions to soldiers who could provide proof of time spent in the military and a disability incurred while in service. Under this system, pension money could be collected from the date of discharge if claims were filed within one year of that date. However, if claims were filed past this date, receipt of pension payment began on the date of application.

This last issue was addressed in the Arrears of Pension Act of 1879, which allowed all Union veterans to reapply for pension and receive back payments to the date of their discharge, regardless of when they may have previously applied. This legislation did not change the requirement that disabilities be service-related but was nevertheless a very expensive bill that set the stage for the larger fight to come. Veterans could now receive large sums of money for several years of "missed" pension payments. This resulted in a flood of applications and a large increase in pension expenditures for the federal government.

== The Grand Army of the Republic ==
Grand Army of the Republic Medal

It was in part the Arrears Act that politically reinvigorated the Grand Army of the Republic (GAR), an organization consisting mostly of Union veterans. With the political assistance of the Republican Party, which opposed the Democratic Party on the issue of pensions, the GAR became much more active in the call for liberal pension legislation following passage of the Arrears Act.

Proposals favored by the GAR were generally either service pension plans or disability pension plans. Service plans included pensions for any Union veteran, given that he served some minimal term in the armed forces. Disability plans more closely represented the final bill passed in 1890 and included pensions for any veteran incapacitated by a disability, regardless of how it was sustained.

== First Attempt ==
The first comprehensive pension disability bill was put together in 1887. This bill was almost identical to the bill to be passed in 1890 in that it granted pensions to all Union veterans with a disability, regardless of its origin. However, it was distinct from the 1890 bill in two ways. First, it awarded all eligible veterans a $12 monthly pension. This differed from the Dependent and Disability Act, which gave pensions worth between $6 and $12 depending on the severity of the disability in question. Second, it required applicants to prove that they were financially dependent on another source, a feature that was absent from the final version of the bill passed in 1890.

Although many lawmakers expected Cleveland to sign the bill, he instead vetoed it on February 11, infuriating the GAR and ensuring that pensions would be a central issue in the 1888 election. Cleveland's primary objections to the bill were that it would be extremely costly, that determining the extent to which applicants were dependent on others would be too difficult, that the pension was ungraded and that the system would be abused by fraud. The bill returned to the House but did not garner enough votes to override the President's veto.

== 1888 Election and Act's Passage ==
When the 1888 election rolled around, the GAR was at the peak of its political influence and, refusing to back down, carried the fight into the 1888 election. The Republican Party nominated Civil War veteran Benjamin Harrison to run against the incumbent Cleveland, promising to push for more extensive pensions and winning the support of the GAR in the process. Cleveland won the popular vote but Harrison won the crucial swing states of Indiana and New York, which contained 38,000 and 45,000 veterans receiving pensions respectively. The Republican Party's pension rhetoric may have proved indispensable in these two states; Harrison captured them by just 2,300 and 13,000 votes respectively.

Following his inauguration, Harrison reorganized the Pension Bureau and appointed James Tanner as the new commissioner of pensions. Although there was widespread corruption under Tanner and his successor Green Raum, Congress continued moving toward legislation aimed at expanding the federal pension program. Harrison pushed for a disability bill, which ultimately passed without a single vote from a Southern congressman. Under the final form of the law, any disabled Union veteran who had served at least ninety days was eligible to receive a pension, regardless of whether or not his disability was incurred in service. The final version of the act also allowed for the collection of pensions by widows of veterans and for children under the age of 16.

== Impact ==
The Disability and Dependent Pension Act was, according to the GAR national pension committee, "the most liberal pension measure ever passed by any legislative body in the world." It resulted in an enormous spike in federal expenditures on pensions. In 1890, just 537,944 veterans were receiving pensions. By 1893, that number had already almost doubled to 966,012. In 1889, the federal government spent $89,000,000 on these pensions, a figure that jumped to $159,000,000 by 1893. By 1894, 37% of the government budget was set aside for pension payments.

As the "largest single appropriation ever made for a government expenditure" the act paved the way for future government pension spending. It would take another step in 1904 when an Executive Order was issued by Theodore Roosevelt declaring all veterans over the age of 62 to be eligible for a pension, effectively making old age a disability.
