= List of autobiographies by presidents of the United States =

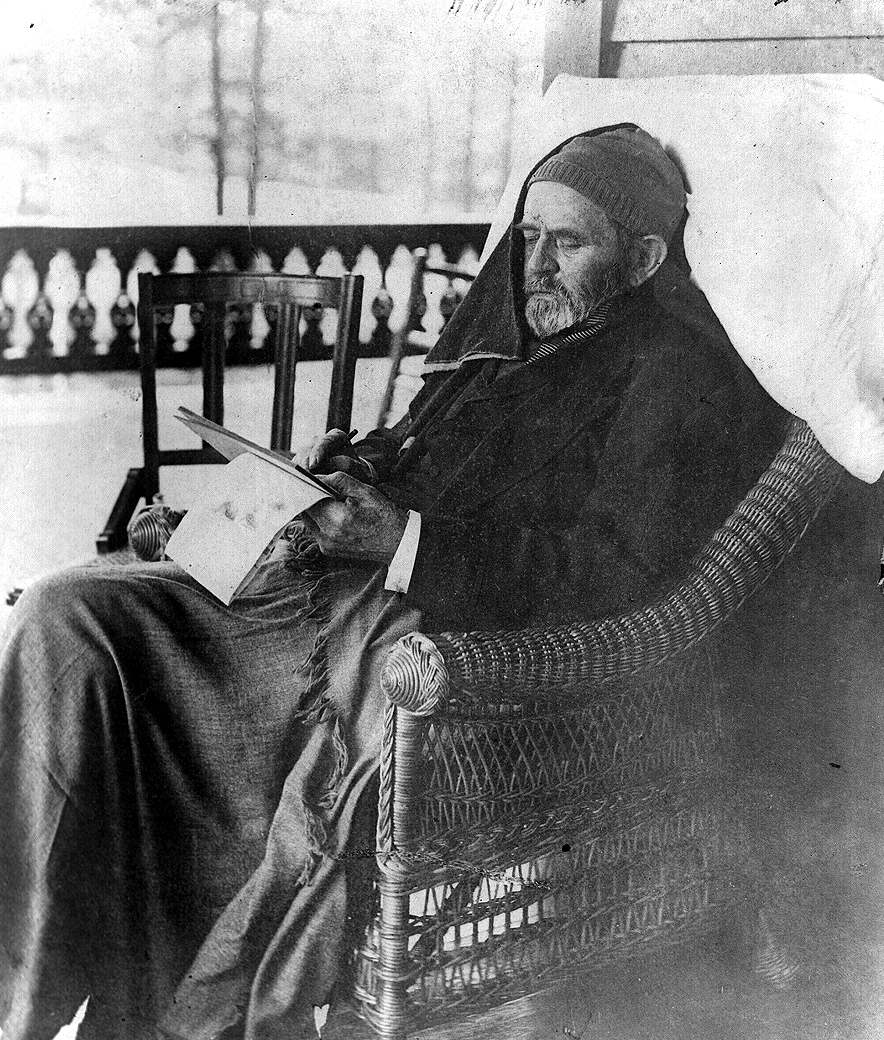
Ulysses S. Grant working on his memoirs in 1885. His Personal Memoirs is considered by historians to be among the best by a U.S. president.

Many presidents of the United States have written autobiographies about their presidencies and/or (some periods of) their life before their time in office. Some 19th-century U.S. presidents who wrote autobiographies are James Buchanan and Ulysses S. Grant, though Grant's autobiography is about his time as general during the American Civil War and not about his presidency. Presidential memoir has proved to be a lasting and popular genre — every president who survived to the end of their term from Calvin Coolidge to Barack Obama has published one after leaving office, and more recent entries have earned their authors tens of millions of dollars in royalties. In addition to ensuring financial security, presidential autobiographies are also written to defend or rehabilitate presidential legacies.

== List of autobiographies ==
=== Covering the period of their presidency ===
Note: Only publication information for the first edition is given.

Title	President	Publisher	Date	ISBN	Notes
The Autobiography of Martin Van Buren	Martin Van Buren	U.S. Government Printing Office	1920		Posthumously compiled and edited from Van Buren's manuscript materials by John C. Fitzpatrick. Volume II
Mr. Buchanan's Administration on the Eve of the Rebellion	James Buchanan	D. Appleton & Company	1866		Link
Theodore Roosevelt: An Autobiography	Theodore Roosevelt	Macmillan	1913		Link
The Autobiography of Calvin Coolidge	Calvin Coolidge	Cosmopolitan Book Corporation. Previously published serially in the periodical Cosmopolitan	1929		Link
The Memoirs of Herbert Hoover	Herbert Hoover	Macmillan	1951		Published in three volumes: Volume 1: Years of Adventure 1874-1920; Volume 2: The Cabinet and the Presidency 1920-1933; Volume 3: The Great Depression 1929-1941
Memoirs: Year of Decisions	Harry S. Truman	Doubleday	1955		
Memoirs: Years of Trial and Hope	Harry S. Truman	Doubleday	1956		
The Autobiography of Harry S Truman	Harry S. Truman	Colorado Associated University Press	1980	ISBN 978-0-870-81090-9	Posthumously compiled and edited from Truman's manuscript materials by historian Robert Ferrell
White House Years: Mandate for Change	Dwight D. Eisenhower	Doubleday	1963		
White House Years: Waging Peace	Dwight D. Eisenhower	Doubleday	1965		
At Ease: Stories I Tell to Friends	Dwight D. Eisenhower	Doubleday	1969	ISBN 978-0-915-99204-1	
The Vantage Point: Perspectives of the Presidency 1963-1969	Lyndon B. Johnson	Holt, Rinehart and Winston	1971	ISBN 978-0-030-84492-8	
RN - The Memoirs of Richard Nixon	Richard Nixon	Grosset & Dunlap	1978	ISBN 978-0-448-14374-3	
In the Arena: A Memoir of Victory, Defeat, and Renewal	Richard Nixon	Simon & Schuster	1990	ISBN 978-0-671-70096-6	
A Time to Heal	Gerald Ford	Harper & Row	1979	ISBN 978-0-060-11297-4	
Keeping Faith: Memoirs of a President	Jimmy Carter	Bantam Books	1982	ISBN 978-0-553-05023-3	
A Full Life: Reflections at 90	Jimmy Carter	Simon & Schuster	2015	ISBN 978-1-501-11563-9	
An American Life	Ronald Reagan	Simon & Schuster	1990	ISBN 978-1-451-62839-5	
A World Transformed	George H. W. Bush	Knopf Publishing Group	1998	ISBN 978-0-679-43248-7	
My Life	Bill Clinton	Knopf Publishing Group	2004	ISBN 978-0-375-41457-2	
Decision Points	George W. Bush	Crown Publishers	2010	ISBN 978-0-307-59061-9	
A Promised Land	Barack Obama	Crown Publishers	2020	ISBN 978-1-524-76316-9	
Promise Me, America	Joe Biden	Little, Brown and Company	2026	ISBN 978-0-316-59848-4	Scheduled release for November 17, 2026.

=== Not covering the period of their presidency ===
Title	President	Publisher	Date	ISBN
The Autobiography of Thomas Jefferson	Thomas Jefferson		1821	
Personal Memoirs of U. S. Grant	Ulysses S. Grant	Charles L. Webster & Company	1885–86	
The Rough Riders	Theodore Roosevelt	Charles Scribner's Sons	1899	
Mr. Citizen	Harry S. Truman	Independence Press	1960	ISBN 978-0830900954
Crusade in Europe	Dwight D. Eisenhower	Doubleday	1948	ISBN 978-0-8018-5668-6
Six Crises	Richard Nixon	Doubleday	1962	ISBN 978-0-385-00125-0
Where's the Rest of Me?	Ronald Reagan	Duell, Sloan and Pearce	1965	ISBN 978-0-918294-16-6
Why Not the Best?: The First Fifty Years	Jimmy Carter	Broadman Press	1975	ISBN 978-0-8054-5582-3
Turning Point: A Candidate, a State, and a Nation Come of Age	Jimmy Carter	Three Rivers Press	1993	ISBN 978-0-8129-2299-8
An Hour Before Daylight: Memories of a Rural Boyhood	Jimmy Carter	Simon & Schuster	2001	ISBN 978-0-7432-1199-4
Looking Forward	George H. W. Bush	Doubleday	1987	ISBN 978-0-385-14181-9
Citizen	Bill Clinton	Alfred A. Knopf	2024	ISBN 978-0525521440
A Charge to Keep	George W. Bush	William Morrow and Company	1999	ISBN 978-0-688-17441-5
Dreams from My Father	Barack Obama	Times Books	1995	ISBN 978-1-4000-8277-3
The Audacity of Hope	Barack Obama	Crown/Three Rivers Press	2006	ISBN 978-0-307-23769-9
The Art of the Deal	Donald Trump	Random House	1987	ISBN 978-0-446-35325-0
Trump: Surviving at the Top	Donald Trump	Random House	1990	ISBN 978-0-394-57597-1
Trump: The Art of the Comeback	Donald Trump	Times Books	1997	ISBN 978-0812929645
Promises to Keep	Joe Biden	Random House	2007	ISBN 978-1-4000-6536-3
Promise Me, Dad	Joe Biden	Flatiron Books	2017	ISBN 978-1250171672

== Published diaries and papers ==
Title	President	Editor	Publisher	Date	ISBN
The Writings of James Madison, comprising his public papers and his private correspondence	James Madison	Gaillard Hunt	G.P. Putnam	1900-1910	
The Diary of John Quincy Adams 1794-1845	John Quincy Adams	Allan Nevins		1928	
The Diary of James K. Polk during His Presidency, 1845 to 1849	James K. Polk	Milo Milton Quaife		1910	
Polk: The Diary of a President	James K. Polk	Allan Nevins		1929	
The Diary of James A. Garfield	James A. Garfield		Michigan State University Press	1967	
The Eisenhower Diaries	Dwight D. Eisenhower	Robert Ferrell	W W Norton & Co Inc	1976	ISBN 978-0-393-33180-6
Prelude to Leadership: The European Diary of John F. Kennedy: Summer 1945	John F. Kennedy		Regnery Publishing	1995	ISBN 978-0-89526-459-6
The Letters of John F. Kennedy	John F. Kennedy	Martin W. Sandler	Bloomsbury Press	2013	ISBN 978-1-60819-271-7
Richard Nixon: Speeches, Writings, Documents	Richard Nixon	Rick Perlstein	Princeton University Press	2010	ISBN 978-1-4008-3568-3
White House Diary	Jimmy Carter		Farrar, Straus and Giroux	2010	ISBN 978-0-374-28099-4
The Reagan Diaries	Ronald Reagan	Douglas Brinkley	HarperCollins	2007	ISBN 978-0-06-087600-5
All the Best	George H. W. Bush		Scribner	1999	ISBN 978-0-684-83958-5

== See also ==
- List of American political memoirs
- List of memoirs by first ladies of the United States
