= Early life and career of Joe Biden =

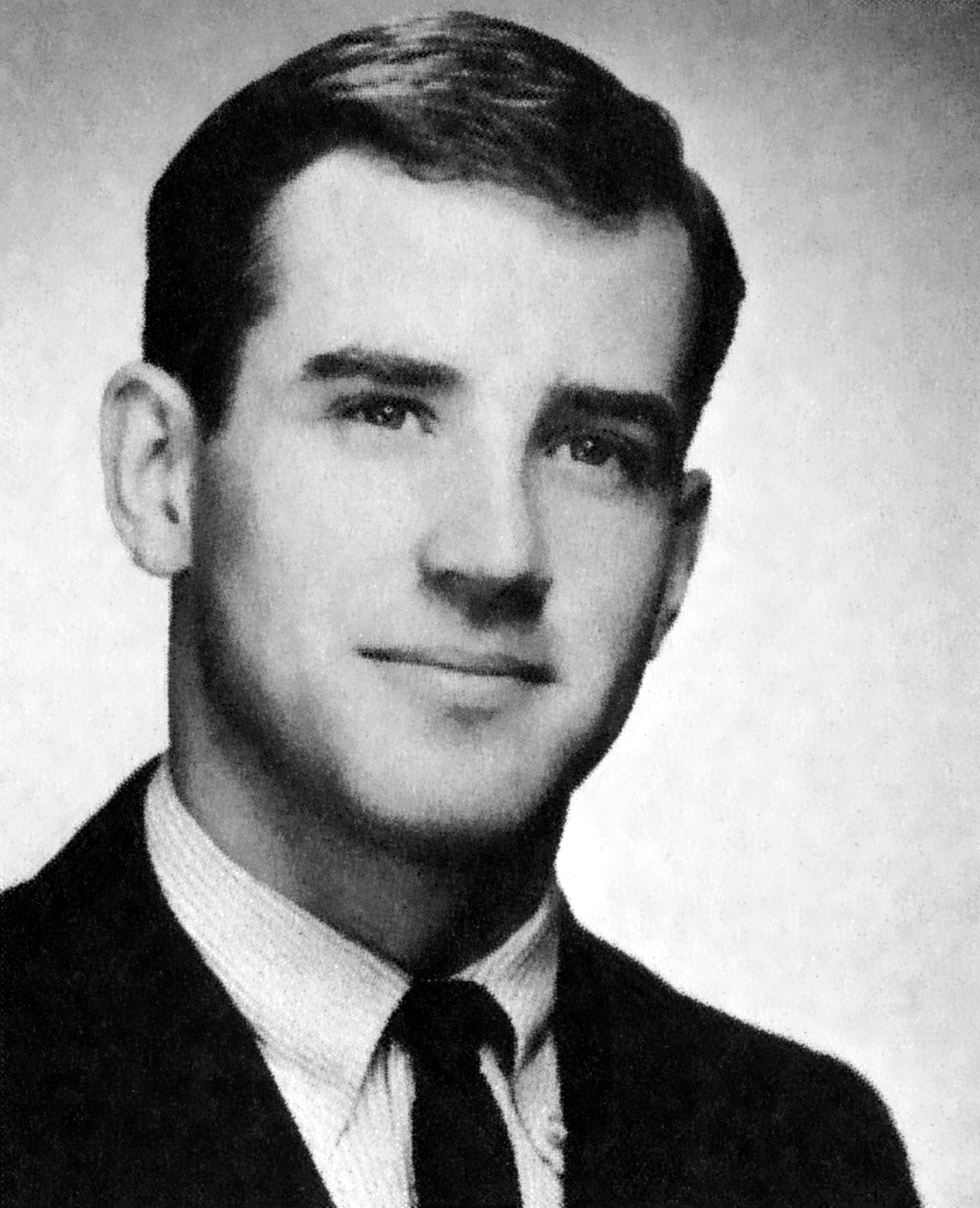
Biden in 1965, while a student at the University of Delaware

Joseph Robinette Biden Jr., the 46th president of the United States, was born on November 20, 1942, at St. Mary's Hospital in Scranton, Pennsylvania, to Catherine Eugenia "Jean" Biden (née Finnegan) and Joseph Robinette Biden Sr. The oldest child in a Catholic family, Biden has a sister, Valerie, and two brothers, Francis and James.

Biden's father had once led an affluent life, but suffered financial setbacks soon after Biden was born, and for several years the family lived with Biden's maternal grandparents. Beginning in 1953, the family lived in an apartment in Claymont, Delaware, before moving to a house in Mayfield, Delaware. Biden's father later became a successful used-car salesman, maintaining the family in a middle-class lifestyle. At Archmere Academy, the later 46th president Joe Biden himself was class president of his junior and senior high school classes, and graduated from Archmere in 1961. At the University of Delaware, Biden earned a Bachelor of Arts degree in 1965 with a double major in history and political science.

In 1966, Biden married Neilia Hunter, a student at Syracuse University. They had three children: Beau, Robert Hunter, and Naomi Christina "Amy". In 1968, Biden earned a Juris Doctor degree from the university's College of Law, ranked 76th in his class of 85 students. He was admitted to the Delaware bar in 1969 and practiced as a lawyer before running for political office. On December 18, 1972, Biden's wife and daughter died in a car crash. He came close to resigning from the U.S. Senate, to which he had recently been elected for the first time that year. Nearly five years later, Biden married Jill Jacobs—they have one daughter together, Ashley.

== Early life and education ==
=== Heritage and childhood ===
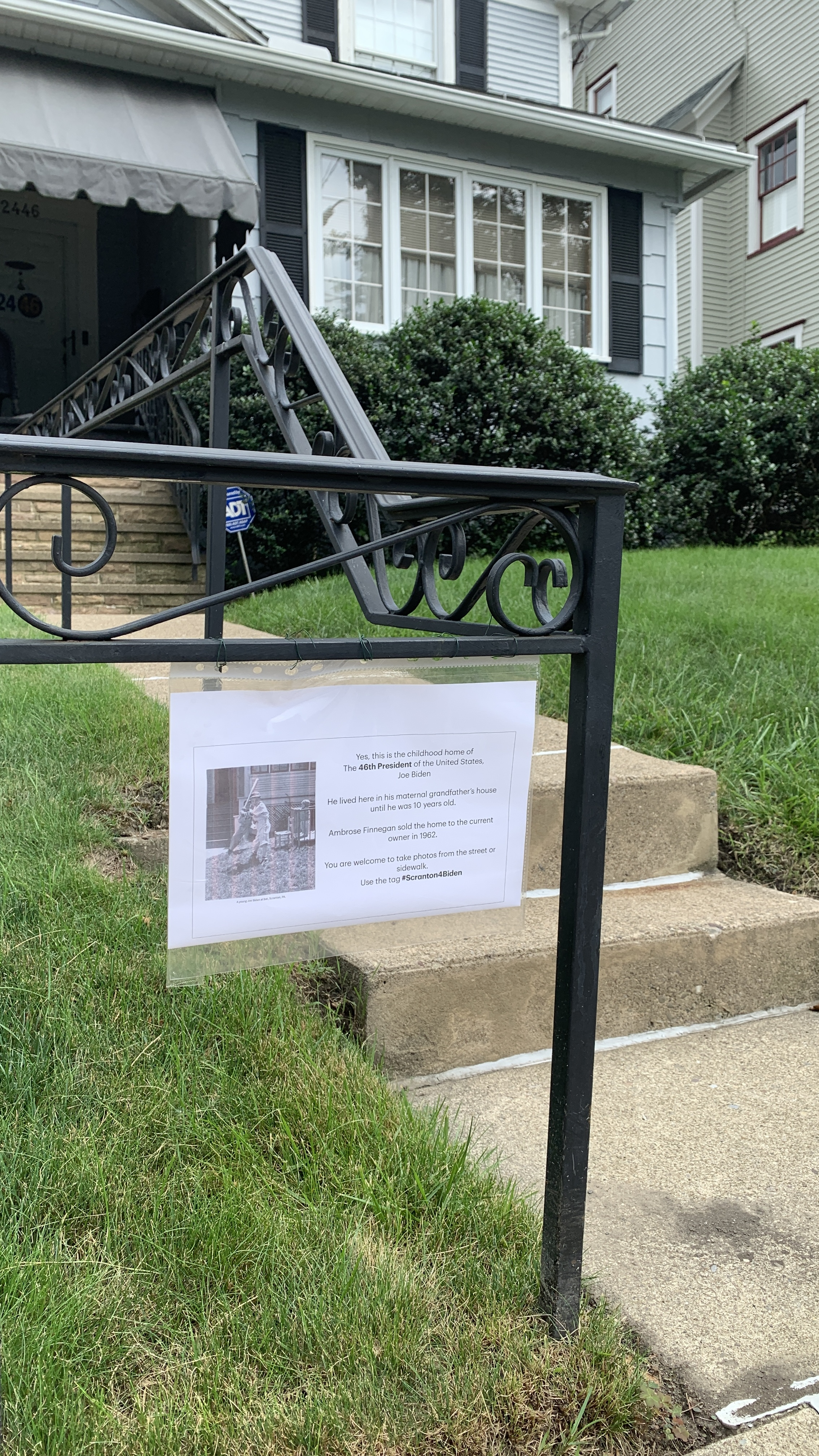
Sign at the childhood home of Joe Biden in Scranton

Biden was born on November 20, 1942, at St. Mary's Hospital in Scranton, Pennsylvania, to Catherine Eugenia "Jean" Biden née Finnegan (1917–2010) and Joseph Robinette Biden Sr (1915–2002). He was the first of four siblings in a Catholic family, with a sister, Valerie (1945), and two brothers, James (1949) and Francis (1953), following. Biden's mother was of Irish descent, with roots variously attributed to County Louth or County Londonderry, while his father had English, French, and Irish ancestry. His maternal great-grandfather, Edward Francis Blewitt, was a Pennsylvania state senator. His maternal grandfather was a graduate of Santa Clara University in California, where he was "an acclaimed quarterback" before returning to Scranton to work for local oil and gas companies, then as a newspaper librarian for the remainder of his career.

Biden's father led an affluent lifestyle as a young adult, "sailing yachts off the New England coast, riding to the hounds, driving fast cars, flying airplanes" while working as an executive for, and experiencing the largess of, the Sheen Company. The Sheen Company was founded and owned by Bill Sheen, Biden's paternal great-uncle. Bill Sheen had invented a material that he then manufactured as lining for cemetery vaults. He subsequently secured a number of US government contracts to make water-tight sealant for merchant marine ships during World War II and renamed the family business to Sheen Armor Company. Early in Biden's life, the family relocated to a "four-bedroom Dutch colonial in a Boston suburb, with plenty of money and perks to fly back to Scranton to visit the Finnegans whenever they wanted" so that Joe Sr. could run Sheen Company's branch office in Boston; Biden's sister, Valerie was born there in 1945. Joe Sr. and his cousin, Bill Sheen Jr., were close friends.

After the war was over, the business failed, and several attempts by Biden Sr. and Sheen Jr. to start a business together faltered. Jean Biden took their children back to Scranton in 1948, and Biden Sr. soon followed. For several years, the family had to live with Biden's maternal grandparents, the Finnegans. Biden Jr. attended St. Paul's School, a Catholic primary school in Scranton. He made several lifelong friends in Scranton, who describe "file drawers full of memories" of childhood antics and escapades. When the Scranton area fell into economic decline during the 1950s, Biden's father could not find steady work.

In 1953, the Biden family moved into an apartment in Claymont, Delaware. The next year, the Bidens relocated to the Village of Arden, an art colony. The year after that, they moved to Mayfield, a neighborhood in Wilmington, Delaware. Joe Biden Sr. became a successful used car salesman, and the family's circumstances were middle class. Biden Jr. attended two more Catholic primary schools: Holy Rosary School in Claymont and then St. Helena's Elementary School in Wilmington. At several times during his youth, Biden considered becoming a priest.

=== High school ===
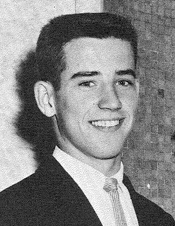
Biden while a student at Archmere Academy in the 1950s

Biden attended the Archmere Academy in Claymont where he was a standout halfback/wide receiver on the high school football team. Scoring ten touchdowns, he helped lead a perennially losing team to an undefeated season in his senior year. His coach, who would be inducted into the Delaware Sports Hall of Fame, subsequently said of Biden, "He was a skinny kid, but he was one of the best pass receivers I had in 16 years as a coach." Biden played as an outfielder on the school's baseball team as well, becoming a starter in his senior year albeit batting in the bottom half of the order.

From an early age, Biden had been afflicted by a severe stutter, which often brought teasing from other children and embarrassment with teachers. Excelling in sports was especially important to Biden as it gave him a way of gaining social acceptance despite his speech issue. While not a major participant in the ongoing civil rights movement, he did walk out of a restaurant that refused to serve a football teammate of his who was black. Academically, Biden was a 'B' (above-average) student at Archmere, was considered a natural leader among his classmates, and was elected class president during his junior and senior years. He graduated in 1961.

=== College ===
Biden attended the University of Delaware in Newark, where he was more interested in sports and socializing than in studying, although his classmates were impressed by his cramming abilities. He played halfback with the "Blue Chicks" freshman football team (at the time, freshmen were not eligible to play varsity sports). However, when he got a poor 1.9 grade point average for the semester, his parents told him that he had to give up football to concentrate on his classes. He continued to get mostly "C" and "D" grades for his next two semesters. His grades then began to improve, but never became especially good. He wanted to return to the football field, and by the spring practices of his junior year he thought he was about to earn a starting spot as a defensive back on the varsity for that fall.

In 1964, while on spring break in the Bahamas, he met and began dating Neilia Hunter, who was from an affluent background in Skaneateles, New York, and attended Syracuse University. He told her that he aimed to become a senator by the age of 30 and then president. He dropped his plan to play for the varsity football team, enabling him to spend more time visiting out of state with her. He earned his bachelor's in 1965 from the University of Delaware, with a double major in history and political science and a minor in English. He had a "C" average overall for his four years, graduating with a class rank of 506 out of 688.

=== Law school ===
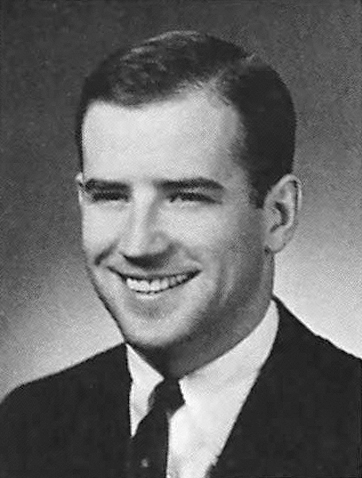
Biden in the Syracuse 1968 yearbook

Biden then entered the Syracuse University College of Law, chosen in part because it would put him near Neilia Hunter. He received a half scholarship based on financial need with some additional assistance based on academics. By his own description, he found law school to be "the biggest bore in the world" and he said he pulled many all-nighters to get by. He relied on the notes of other students for classes that he skipped as well as help from Neilia Hunter in studying. He participated in football and rugby at the collegiate club level and ran for class president, losing by one vote to future financial marketplace executive William J. Brodsky. To date, Brodsky is the only person to ever beat Biden in a head-to-head election. (Note: Biden has been defeated in some presidential primary and caucus contests.)

During his first year there, Biden submitted a fifteen-page paper for a legal methods course that was found to have contained academic plagiarism of five pages of a recently published article in the Fordham Law Review. A report from the law school faculty said that Biden should be failed in the course as a result; in response, Biden said the copying was inadvertent due to his not knowing the proper rules of citation. Such mistakes were not uncommon among first-year students still learning the requirements of attribution. Biden was permitted to retake the course after receiving a failing "F" grade, which was subsequently dropped from his record. (Note: This incident would attract attention in 1987 when further plagiarism accusations emerged during his 1988 presidential campaign; some exaggerations and inaccurate statements that Biden had made regarding his college and law school accomplishments also became an issue, causing Biden to release transcripts and other documents from both schools.)

Overall, evaluations from Biden's professors were mixed, but Biden's grades were such that he was consistently near the bottom of his class the entire time he was in the school. One professor later said that Biden had done very well in a legislation course and that "I had the impression this was a young man who was going to do well and go a long way," while another professor later said of Biden, "He was one of the great successes after law school, but not in law school. It happens all the time." Biden received his Juris Doctor in 1968, graduating 76th of 85 in his class. He was admitted to the Delaware bar in 1969.

=== Other experiences ===
Negative impressions of drinking alcohol in the Biden and Finnegan families and in the neighborhood led to Biden becoming a teetotaler. Having suffered from stuttering through much of his childhood and into his twenties, he has said that he finally overcame it by spending many hours reciting poetry in front of a mirror.

During the early 1960s, Biden participated in a demonstration against the last remaining segregated theater in Wilmington. Some sources have also described Biden participating in a protest while he was still in high school, against the Towne Theatre.

During the summer of 1962, while in college, Biden worked as the only white lifeguard at a swimming pool in a black neighborhood of Wilmington, an experience which he later credited with expanding his thinking regarding racial issues. Later in life, Biden repeatedly told a story that, while working at the pool, he confronted a man nicknamed "Corn Pop", the leader of a gang called the Romans, persuading the man to walk away from a potential fight by apologizing to him. While considered outlandish or bizarre by some commentators, various lifelong Delawareans and contemporary newspaper articles confirmed the broad outlines of Biden's story, identifying his antagonist as a man named William "Corn Pop" Morris.

==== Draft ====
Regarding the U.S. military draft, Biden received five "2-S" student deferments during this period, with the first coming in late 1963 and the last in early 1968 at the peak of the Vietnam War. Student deferments such as the ones Biden received were given out routinely during this period. In April 1968, he received a draft notice as he was about to graduate from law school; but after a medical examination he was reclassified by the Selective Service System as "1-Y", not available for service except in national emergency, due to having had asthma as a teenager. The notion that Biden suffered from asthma has been questioned by some observers, given his past participation in football and other sports and his having appeared healthy in the time leading up to his examination. Some sources report that Biden's 2007 memoir, Promises to Keep, never mentions asthma; but he does briefly mention having had "childhood asthma" in a passage in the book describing his health during and after his 1988 presidential campaign. Young men looking to avoid active-duty military service was common during the Vietnam War. Other figures from the era who would go on to become national leaders also received similar numbers of student deferments or non-obvious medical exemptions. Biden was generally supportive of the war during much of this time, and never took part in anti-war demonstrations, later saying that at the time he was preoccupied with marriage and law school, and "wore sports coats ... not tie-dyed".

== Early political career and family life ==
On August 27, 1966, while Biden was still a law student, he married Neilia Hunter. They overcame her Presbyterian parents' initial reluctance for her to wed a Roman Catholic, and the ceremony was held in a Catholic church in Skaneateles. The couple had three children, Joseph R. "Beau" Biden III in 1969, Robert Hunter in 1970, and Naomi Christina in 1971.

During 1968, Biden clerked for six months at a law firm headed by prominent local Republican William Prickett and, as he later said, "thought of myself as a Republican". He disliked the conservative racial politics of incumbent Democratic Governor of Delaware Charles L. Terry and supported a more liberal Republican, Russell W. Peterson, who defeated Terry in 1968. The local Republicans tried to recruit him, but he resisted due to his distaste for Republican presidential candidate Richard Nixon, and registered as an Independent instead.

In 1969, Biden resumed practicing law, first as a public defender in Wilmington, Delaware. Most of his clients were African Americans from Wilmington's east side. Biden's time as a public defender was short, but several of his cases attracted newspaper coverage, including his defenses of a fisherman accused of stealing a cow (sentenced to no jail time), and a 15-year-old charged with drug possession (acquitted). Biden later described the job in his memoir as "God's work", but also wrote that "God's work wasn't full time work in 1969".

Biden then joined a firm headed by Sid Balick, a locally active Democrat. Balick named him to the Democratic Forum, a group trying to reform and revitalize the state party, and Biden switched his registration to Democratic. He also started his own firm, Biden and Walsh. Corporate law, however, did not appeal to him and criminal law did not pay well. He supplemented his income by managing properties.

Later in 1969, Biden ran as a Democrat for the New Castle County Council on a liberal platform that included support for public housing in the suburban area. He won by a solid, two-thousand vote margin in the usually Republican district and in a bad year for Democrats in the state. Even before taking his seat, he was already talking about running for the U.S. Senate in a couple of years. He served on the County Council from 1970 to 1972 while continuing his private law practice. Biden represented the 4th district on the county council. Among issues he addressed on the council was his opposition to large highway projects that might disrupt Wilmington neighborhoods, including those related to Interstate 95.

=== 1972 U.S. Senate campaign ===
Biden's entry into the 1972 U.S. Senate election in Delaware presented a unique circumstance. Longtime Delaware political figure and Republican incumbent Senator J. Caleb Boggs was considering retirement, which would likely have left U.S. Representative Pete du Pont and Wilmington Mayor Harry G. Haskell Jr. in a divisive primary fight. To avoid that, U.S. president Richard Nixon helped convince Boggs to run again with full party support. No other Democrat wanted to run against Boggs. Biden's campaign had virtually no money and was given no chance of winning. It was managed by his sister Valerie Biden Owens (who would go on to manage his future campaigns) and staffed by other family members, and relied upon handed-out newsprint position papers and meeting voters face-to-face; the small size of the state and lack of a major media market made the approach feasible. He did receive some assistance from the AFL–CIO and Democratic pollster Patrick Caddell. His campaign issues focused on withdrawal from Vietnam, the environment, civil rights, mass transit, more equitable taxation, health care, the public's dissatisfaction with politics-as-usual, and "change". During the summer, he trailed by almost 30 percentage points, but his energy level, his attractive young family, and his ability to connect with voters' emotions gave the surging Biden an advantage over the ready-to-retire Boggs. He won the November 7, 1972 election in an upset by a margin of 3,162 votes.

=== Death of wife and daughter ===
On December 18, 1972, a few weeks after the election, Biden's wife and one-year-old daughter Naomi were killed in an automobile accident while Christmas shopping in Hockessin, Delaware. Neilia Biden's station wagon was hit by a tractor-trailer truck as she pulled out from an intersection, possibly because her head was turned and she did not see the other vehicle; the truck swerved and overturned in an attempt to avoid the collision. Within a couple of days of the accident, a Delaware chief deputy attorney general, Jerome O. Herlihy, announced that the truck driver had been cleared of any wrongdoing in it.

Biden's sons Beau and Hunter survived the accident and were taken to the hospital in fair condition, Beau with a broken leg and other wounds, and Hunter with a minor skull fracture and other head injuries. Doctors soon said both would make full recoveries. Biden considered resigning to care for them, saying that the people of Delaware "can always get another senator" but that his children "can't get another father," but was persuaded not to by Senate Majority Leader Mike Mansfield.

In later years, Biden said on several occasions that the truck driver had been drinking alcohol before the collision, and several media outlets reported this as fact. The driver died in 1999, but his daughter sought to have his name again cleared and to get an apology from Biden. By this time, the police records regarding the accident had been lost, but the accident investigator Herlihy, who had become a Delaware Superior Court judge, reiterated that "The rumor about alcohol being involved by either party, especially the truck driver, is incorrect." Subsequently, a Biden spokesperson said that Biden "fully accepts the [driver's] family's word that these rumors were false." Biden called the driver's daughter to apologize personally, which she accepted.

== Senate and recovery ==
=== Entering the Senate ===
Biden was sworn into office on January 5, 1973, by Francis R. Valeo, the secretary of the Senate, in a small chapel at the Delaware Division of the Wilmington Medical Center. Beau was wheeled in with his leg still in traction; Hunter, who had already been released, was also there, as were other members of the extended family. Witnesses and television cameras were also present and the event received national attention.

At age 30 (the minimum age required to hold the office), Biden became the sixth-youngest senator in U.S. history, and one of only 18 senators who took office before reaching the age of 31. But the accident had left him filled with both anger and religious doubt: "I liked to [walk around seedy neighborhoods] at night when I thought there was a better chance of finding a fight ... I had not known I was capable of such rage ... I felt God had played a horrible trick on me." To be at home every day for his young sons, Biden began the practice of commuting every day by Amtrak train for 90 minutes each way from his home in the Wilmington suburbs to Washington, D.C., which he continued to do throughout his Senate career. In the aftermath of the accident, he had trouble focusing on work and appeared to just go through the motions of being a senator. In his memoirs, Biden notes that staffers were taking bets on how long he would last. A single father for five years, he left standing orders that he be interrupted in the Senate at any time if his sons called. In remembrance of his wife and daughter, Biden does not work on December 18, the anniversary of the accident.

Nonetheless, during these first years in the Senate, Biden focused on consumer protection and environmental issues and called for greater government accountability. He supported legislation dedicated to campaign finance reform, reflecting that during his senate election, offers of campaign funds in implicit return for future favors had been tempting in light of his lack of personal wealth. In mid-1974, Time magazine named Biden as one of the 200 Faces for the Future in a profile that mentioned what had happened to his family, calling him "self-confident" and "compulsively ambitious".

=== Recovery and second marriage ===
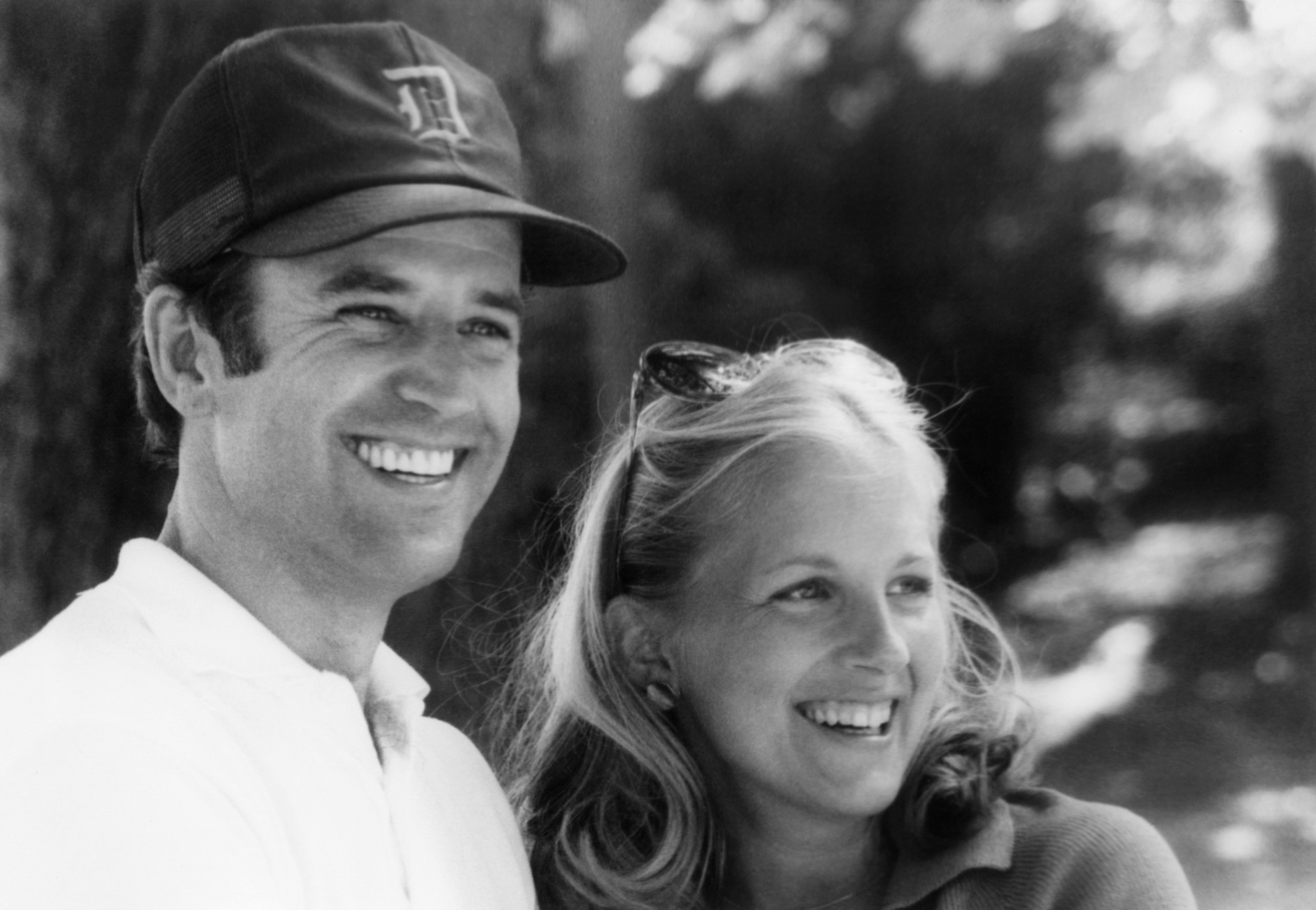
Biden and his second wife, Jill, met in 1975 and married in 1977.

By 1974, Biden had begun dating again, while avoiding marriage in the belief it would be unfair to his partner—he described himself to a reporter as "still in love with his wife". However, in 1975, Biden met Jill Tracy Jacobs, who had grown up in Willow Grove, Pennsylvania, and become a teacher in Delaware. They met on a blind date arranged by Biden's brother, although it turned out that Biden had already noticed a photograph of her in an advertisement for a local park in Wilmington, Delaware. Biden would credit her with renewing his interest in both politics and life. He proposed marriage to her several times before she accepted; she was wary of entering the public spotlight, anxious to remain focused on her own career, and initially hesitant to take on the commitment of raising his two young sons who had survived the accident.

On June 17, 1977, Biden and Jacobs were married by a Catholic priest at the Chapel at the United Nations in New York City. They spent their honeymoon at Lake Balaton in the Hungarian People's Republic, behind the Iron Curtain; the destination was chosen upon the recommendation of Hungarian-born Biden staffer Tom Lantos. Joe and Jill Biden have one daughter together, Ashley Blazer (born 1981), and regularly attend Mass at St. Joseph's on the Brandywine in Greenville, Delaware.
