= Bibliography of Joe Biden =

Books by and about the US president

This bibliography of Joe Biden is a chronological list of written and published works, by and about Joe Biden. In addition to works authored by Biden, the titles listed here are limited to notable non-fiction books about Biden or his presidency, published by well-known authors, journalists, and scholars. Tertiary sources (including textbooks and juvenile literature), satire, and self-published books are excluded.

== By Biden ==
=== Books ===
- Biden, Joseph R. Jr.; Helms, Jesse (April 1, 2000). Hague Convention on International Child Abduction: Applicable Law and Institutional Framework Within Certain Convention Countries Report to the Senate. Diane Publishing. ISBN 978-0-7567-2250-0.
- Biden, Joseph R. Jr. (July 8, 2001). Putin Administration's Policies toward Non-Russian Regions of the Russian Federation: Hearing before the Committee on Foreign Relations, U.S. Senate (PDF). U.S. Government Printing Office. ISBN 978-0-7567-2624-9.
- Biden, Joseph R. Jr. (July 24, 2001). Administration's Missile Defense Program and the ABM Treaty: Hearing Before the Committee on Foreign Relations, U.S. Senate (PDF). U.S. Government Printing Office. ISBN 978-0-7567-1959-3. Archived from the original (PDF) on March 5, 2016.
- Biden, Joseph R. Jr. (September 5, 2001). Threat of Bioterrorism and the Spread of Infectious Diseases: Hearing before the Committee on Foreign Relations, U.S. Senate (PDF). U.S. Government Printing Office. ISBN 978-0-7567-2625-6.
- Biden, Joseph R. Jr. (February 12, 2002). Examining The Theft Of American Intellectual Property At Home And Abroad: Hearing before the Committee on Foreign Relations, U.S. Senate (PDF). U.S. Government Printing Office. ISBN 978-0-7567-4177-8.
- Biden, Joseph R. Jr. (February 14, 2002). Halting the Spread of HIV/AIDS: Future Efforts in the U.S. Bilateral & Multilateral Response: Hearings before the Comm. on Foreign Relations, U.S. Senate. Diane Publishing. ISBN 978-0-7567-3454-1.
- Biden, Joseph R. Jr. (February 27, 2002). How Do We Promote Democratization, Poverty Alleviation, and Human Rights to Build a More Secure Future: Hearing before the Committee on Foreign Relations, U.S. Senate (PDF). U.S. Government Printing Office. ISBN 978-0-7567-2478-8.
- Biden, Joseph R. Jr. (August 1, 2002). Hearings to Examine Threats, Responses, and Regional Considerations Surrounding Iraq: Hearing before the Committee on Foreign Relations, U.S. Senate (PDF). U.S. Government Printing Office. ISBN 978-0-7567-2823-6.
- Biden, Joseph R. Jr. (January 1, 2003). International Campaign Against Terrorism: Hearing before the Committee on Foreign Relations, U.S. Senate. Diane Publishing. ISBN 978-0-7567-3041-3.
- Biden, Joseph R. Jr. (January 1, 2003). Political Future of Afghanistan: Hearing before the Committee on Foreign Relations, U.S. Senate. Diane Publishing. ISBN 978-0-7567-3039-0.
- Biden, Joseph R. Jr. (September 1, 2003). Strategies for Homeland Defense: A Compilation by the Committee on Foreign Relations, U.S. Senate. Diane Publishing. ISBN 978-0-7567-2623-2.
- Biden, Joseph R. Jr. (July 31, 2007). Promises to Keep. Random House. ISBN 978-1-4000-6536-3. Also paperback edition, Random House 2008, ISBN 978-0-8129-7621-2.
- Biden, Joseph R. Jr. (November 14, 2017). Promise Me, Dad: A Year of Hope, Hardship, and Purpose. Flatiron Books. ISBN 978-1-250-17167-2.
- Biden, Joseph R. Jr. (November 17, 2026). Promise Me, America (1st ed.). Little, Brown and Company. p. 448. ISBN 9781399844284.

=== Book contributions ===
- Biden, Joseph R. Jr. (2005). "Foreword". In Nicholson, William C. (ed.). Homeland Security Law and Policy. C. C Thomas. ISBN 978-0-398-07583-5.
- Biden, Joseph R. Jr. (2009). "Foreword". In Hayman, Robert L. Jr.; Leland, Ware (eds.). Choosing Equality: Essays and Narratives on the Desegregation Experience. University Park: Pennsylvania State University Press. ISBN 978-0-271-03433-1.
- Biden, Joseph R. Jr.; McBride, Sarah (March 6, 2018). "Foreword". Tomorrow Will Be Different: Love, Loss, and the Fight for Trans Equality. University Park: Crown Archetype. ISBN 978-1524761479.

=== Pamphlets ===
- Biden, Joseph R. Jr., and Les Aspin, William Louis Dickinson, Brent Scowcroft (1982). Arms Sales: A Useful Foreign Policy Tool? American Enterprise Institute. AEI Forum 56. Moderated by John Charles Daly.

=== Articles ===
- Biden, Joseph R. Jr. (1984). "Who Needs the Legislative Veto?". Syracuse Law Review. 35: 685–701 – via HeinOnline.
- Biden, Joseph R. Jr.; Purev-Ochir, Miga (Spring 2015). "U.S.-Russian Relations in a Post–Cold War World: A Strategic Vision: Mapping a Future for U.S.-Russian Relations". Harvard International Review. 36 (3): 72–76. JSTOR 43649299.
- Biden, Joe (August 27, 2023). "We must keep marching toward Dr. King's dream". The Washington Post. ISSN 0190-8286.
- Biden, Joe (November 18, 2023). "The U.S. won't back down from the challenge of Putin and Hamas". The Washington Post. ISSN 0190-8286.
- Biden, Joe (December 16, 2024). "From the Middle Out and Bottom Up". The American Prospect. ISSN 1049-7285.

== About Biden ==
Books about Biden during his presidential campaign and presidency have been significantly fewer in number than those related to his predecessor, Donald Trump. Journalists have noted that sales for books about Biden have been low, attributing this to disinterest from the public, Biden's desire to reduce the drama of the White House and his staff's lack of propensity to leak.

=== Focused on Biden ===
- Witcover, Jules (2010). Joe Biden: A Life of Trial and Redemption. New York City: William Morrow. ISBN 978-0-06-179198-7.
- Osnos, Evan (2020). Joe Biden: The Life, the Run, and What Matters Now. Simon & Schuster. ISBN 9781982174026.
- Allen, Jonathan; Parnes, Amie (2021). Lucky: How Joe Biden Barely Won the Presidency. Crown Publishing Group. ISBN 978-0525574224.
- Schreckinger, Ben (September 21, 2021). The Bidens: Inside the First Family's Fifty-Year Rise to Power. New York: Hachette. ISBN 9781538738009.
- Spicer, Sean (October 26, 2021). Radical Nation: Joe Biden and Kamala Harris's Dangerous Plan for America. Humanix Books. ISBN 978-1630061715.
- Debenedetti, Gabriel (September 13, 2022). The Long Alliance: The Imperfect Union of Joe Biden and Barack Obama. Henry Holt and Co. ISBN 978-1250829979.
- Beck, Glenn; Haskins, Justin Trask (January 11, 2022). The Great Reset: Joe Biden and the Rise of Twenty-First-Century Fascism. Forefront Books. ISBN 978-1637630594.
- Whipple, Chris (2023). The Fight of His Life: Inside Joe Biden's White House. Scribner. ISBN 978-1982106430.
- Foer, Franklin (2023). The Last Politician: Inside Joe Biden's White House and the Struggle for America's Future. Penguin Press. ISBN 978-1101981146.
- Marlow, Alex (2023). Breaking Biden: Exposing the Hidden Forces and Secret Money Machine Behind Joe Biden, His Family, and His Administration. Threshold Editions. ISBN 978-1668023006.
- Tapper, Jake; Thompson, Alex (2025). Original Sin: President Biden's Decline, Its Cover-up, and His Disastrous Choice to Run Again. Penguin Press. ISBN 979-8-217-06067-2.

=== Related to Biden ===
- Bronner, Ethan (1989). Battle for Justice: How the Bork Nomination Shook America. W. W. Norton & Company. ISBN 0-393-02690-6.
- Germond, Jack; Witcover, Jules (1989). Whose Broad Stripes and Bright Stars? The Trivial Pursuit of the Presidency 1988. Warner Books. ISBN 0-446-51424-1.
- Taylor, Paul (1990). See How They Run: Electing the President in an Age of Mediaocracy. Alfred A. Knopf. ISBN 0-394-57059-6.
- Cramer, Richard Ben (1992). What It Takes: The Way to the White House. New York: Random House. ISBN 0-394-56260-7. OCLC 24794262.
- Heilemann, John; Halperin, Mark (2010). Game Change: Obama and the Clintons, McCain and Palin, and the Race of a Lifetime. New York: HarperCollins. ISBN 978-0-06-173363-5.
- Heilemann, John; Halperin, Mark (2013). Double Down: Game Change 2012. New York: Penguin Press. ISBN 978-1594204401.
- Biden, Hunter (2021). Beautiful Things. Gallery Books. ISBN 9781982151119. OCLC 1237604218.
- Biden Owens, Valerie (April 12, 2022). Growing Up Biden: A Memoir. Celadon Books. ISBN 978-1250821768.
- Woodward, Bob (October 15, 2024). War. Simon & Schuster. ISBN 978-1-6680-5227-3.
- Allen, Jonathan; Parnes, Amie (April 1, 2025). Fight: Inside the Wildest Battle for the White House. HarperCollins. ISBN 978-0063438644.
