= War of 1812 (disambiguation) =

The War of 1812 was a military conflict between the United States of America and the British Empire.

- Additional articles about the war
  - War of 1812 campaigns, a synopsis of the land campaigns of the North American War of 1812
  - Origins of the War of 1812
- Articles about responses to or commemorations of the war
  - War of 1812 (board game), a 1973 board wargame by Gamma Two Games (now Columbia Games)
  - War of 1812 Monument, a memorial located in Ottawa, Canada
  - Bibliography of the War of 1812
  - List of War of 1812 Bicentennial
  - The Naval War of 1812, a book by Theodore Roosevelt
  - War of 1812 museum (disambiguation)

War of 1812 may also refer to:

- The French invasion of Russia
- Anglo-Swedish war of 1810–1812
- Anglo-Russian War (1807–1812)
- Peninsular War (1808–1814)
- Russo-Persian War (1804–1813)
- Russo-Turkish War (1806–1812)

== See also ==
- American War (disambiguation)
- "1812 Overture", a musical work by Tchaikovsky about the French invasion of Russia
- Category:Conflicts in 1812
