= A Promised Land =

2020 memoir by Barack Obama

- Author: Barack Obama
- Language: English
- Series: The Presidential Memoirs, Volume 1
- Subject: Autobiography; Political memoir
- Publisher: Crown
- Publication date: November 17, 2020
- Publication place: United States
- Media type: Print
- Pages: 768
- ISBN: 978-1-5247-6316-9 hardcover
- OCLC: 1196086067
- Dewey Decimal: 973.932092
- LC Class: E908

A Promised Land is a memoir by Barack Obama, the 44th president of the United States from 2009 to 2017. Published on November 17, 2020, it is the first of a planned two-volume series. Remaining focused on his political career, the presidential memoir documents Obama's life from his early years through to the events surrounding the killing of Osama bin Laden in May 2011. The book is 768 pages long and available in digital, paperback, and hardcover formats and has been translated into two dozen languages. There is also a 29-hour audiobook edition that is read by Obama himself.

The book was met with critical praise, and was placed on several end-of-year best-of lists by The New York Times, The Washington Post, and The Guardian. Commercially, it has been highly successful and, as of the February 7, 2021 issue, the book has been the New York Times best-seller in non-fiction for ten consecutive weeks. The book was highly anticipated and, two months before its release, The New York Times remarked that it was "virtually guaranteed" to be the year's top seller, despite its mid-November release date.

== Background ==
Barack Obama had previously published two books. The memoir Dreams from My Father: A Story of Race and Inheritance was published in 1995 by Times Books and the political book The Audacity of Hope: Thoughts on Reclaiming the American Dream was published worldwide in 2006 by Crown Publishing Group.

A Promised Land follows two years behind First Lady Michelle Obama's bestselling memoir Becoming, which was also published by Crown and was released on November 13, 2018. It is the first of a planned two-volume series. Each President since Harry S. Truman (save John F. Kennedy, due to his untimely death, and George H. W. Bush) has released a full-length memoir; at over 3 years, Obama's took longer to write than any of them. The previous president with the longest time between leaving office and publishing their memoir was Richard Nixon. Obama admitted that he originally intended to "write a 500-page memoir and be done in a year" compared to the 700-page memoir after three years that A Promised Land became.

== Content ==
Obama said in a tweet following the announcement of the publication of the book that he aimed to "provide an honest accounting of my presidency, the forces we grapple with as a nation, and how we can heal our divisions and make democracy work for everybody".

=== Summary ===
The memoir, remaining focused on Obama's political life, begins with his early life, details his first campaigns, and stretches through most of his first term as president. The book concludes with the events surrounding the killing of Osama bin Laden in May 2011, ending with a meeting between Obama and the Navy SEALs who conducted the raid. While the book remains focused on politics, the first 200 pages of the book, approximately, are devoted to Obama's life and career up through his time in Chicago.

=== Highlights ===
==== College ====
Obama, when describing his days attending college in the 1980s, admitted that he would read Karl Marx, Michel Foucault, and Herbert Marcuse in order to impress potential love interests. Obama reminisced that "it's embarrassing to recognize the degree to which my intellectual curiosity those first two years of college paralleled the interests of various women I was attempting to get to know." Obama stated that "as a strategy for picking up girls, my pseudo-intellectualism proved mostly worthless."

==== Descriptions of other politicians ====
Obama gives favorable descriptions to many of the staffers and other politicians that he encounters throughout his early life and presidency. In her review for The New York Times, Chimamanda Ngozi Adichie noted that Obama's "affection for his first-term inner circle" was "moving" and that in his descriptions of others, he "makes heroes of people". The memoir praises Claire McCaskill, who served as a U.S. Senator from Missouri from 2007 to 2019, for "voting her conscience" on The Dream Act, Tim Geithner for his handling of the 2008 financial crisis, and many others.

Obama is also critical in his description of some other world leaders, such as by writing that Vladimir Putin's "satirical image of masculine vigor" has the quality of "the fastidiousness of a teenager on Instagram." Obama also describes Prime Minister of the United Kingdom David Cameron as someone with "the easy confidence of someone who’d never been pressed too hard by life".

==== Nobel Prize ====
Some reviewers commented on Obama's reaction to winning the 2009 Nobel Peace Prize, writing in the book that his simple response was "for what?". Obama elaborated when arriving in Oslo for the Nobel ceremony: "The idea that I, or any one person, could bring order to such chaos seemed laughable... On some level, the crowds below were cheering an illusion." Chimamanda Ngozi Adichie and Eli Stokols, in their respective reviews, described the reaction as "incredulous". Obama also recalled telling the First Lady the news after an early morning phone call and receiving the reply "that's wonderful honey", before she went back to sleep. In analyzing the response, Adichie noted that Obama "considers his public image overinflated; he pushes pins into his own hype balloons."

==== United Nations ====
Obama notes in the book, "In the middle of the Cold War, the chances of reaching any real consensus had been slim, which is why the U.N. had stood idle as Soviet tanks rolled into Hungary or U.S. planes dropped napalm on the Vietnamese countryside. Even after the Cold War, divisions within the Security Council continued to hamstring the U.N.'s ability to tackle problems. Its member states lacked either the means or the collective will to reconstruct failing states like Somalia, or prevent ethnic slaughter in places like Sri Lanka."

== Reception ==
=== Praise ===
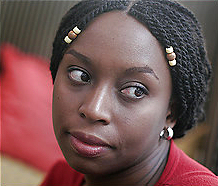
Nigerian writer Chimamanda Ngozi Adichie praised Obama's prose and detail in the book for justifying its length.

In the opening of one review, published as the front page of The New York Times Book Review on November 29, 2020, Chimamanda Ngozi Adichie wrote that Obama "is as fine a writer as they come" and argued that it is "not merely that this book avoids being ponderous, as might be expected, even forgiven, of a hefty memoir, but that it is nearly always pleasurable to read, sentence by sentence, the prose gorgeous in places, the detail granular and vivid." Publishers Weekly posted a review stating that Obama "delivers a remarkably introspective chronicle of his rise to the White House and his first two-and-a-half years in office", before closing with: "This sterling account rises above the crowded field of presidential postmortems." The book's entry in Kirkus Reviews includes the tag line: "A top-notch political memoir and serious exercise in practical politics for every reader." Walter Clemens wrote a review of the book in the New York Journal of Books that opened with "[e]very sentence in this book deserves to be treasured and relished" and closed by stating "anyone who wishes to understand America in the early 21st century should read this book—or listen to it in an audio version narrated by the former president". The book was also reviewed by Eric Foner in The Times Literary Supplement, who wrote that the book is "elegantly written" and is "certainly among the most impressive contributions to this minor genre", noting: "A gifted writer, he maintains the reader's interest for over 700 pages".

Among magazine reviews, Laura Miller, in Slate Magazine, wrote that the book "is a pleasure to read for the intelligence, equanimity, and warmth of its author—from his unfeigned delight in his fabulously wholesome family to his manifest fondness for the people who worked for and with him, especially early on". Time published a review that stated "Obama knows how to tell a good story" and that "[h]is insight into his mindset during his biggest presidential moments is a reminder of his thoughtfulness". The review continued by stating that "from cover to cover, A Promised Land is a reminder of the narrative that Obama has spent his career enunciating". Other reviews were published in The Wall Street Journal, The Financial Times, Entertainment Weekly, Esquire, and Oprah Magazine.

Among newspaper reviews, Eli Stokols wrote a review of the book that was published in both the Los Angeles Times, and The Pittsburgh Post-Gazette. Stokols wrote that the book is "deeply introspective and at times elegiac" and has "elegant prose". Stokols went on to write that the book "often reads like a conversation Obama is having with himself", as he would express self-doubt over his various actions and inactions while in office. Editor-in-chief of The Atlantic, Jeffrey Goldberg, wrote that the book is "an unusual presidential memoir in many ways: unusually interior, unusually self-critical, unusually modern..., and unusually well written." Peter Bergen of CNN wrote a review, stating that the book is "moving" and "beautifully written" and finishes the review by stating the second volume "will surely be another very compelling book".

In a review in The Guardian, Gary Younge wrote: "As a work of political literature A Promised Land is impressive" and that "Obama is a gifted writer". In a second review published by The Guardian, Julian Borger describes the book as "701 pages of elegantly written narrative, contemplation and introspection, in which he frequently burrows down into his own motivations" and that it "delivers amply on the basic expectations of political autobiographies, providing a granular view from the driving seat of power." In a third review in The Guardian, Peter Conrad wrote: "Like the best autobiographers, Barack Obama writes about himself in the hope of discovering who or even what he is."

The book was also reviewed by Carlos Lozada in The Washington Post, and Nate Marshall in the Chicago Tribune. The book also received a second review in The New York Times that described it as "700 pages that are as deliberative, measured and methodical as the author himself". The review states that, while the book comes during "a time of grandiose mythologizing", Obama "marshals his considerable storytelling skills to demythologize himself". The review then argues that, while it is addressed to "young people who seek to 'remake the world'", the book "is less about unbridled possibility and more about the forces that inhibit it". Several British newspapers, including The Times, Observer, and The Independent, have published reviews of the book as well. Among other news agencies, it was also reviewed by The Boston Globe and NPR.

=== Critique ===
In her review, Chimamanda Ngozi Adichie criticized Obama for his incessant "reluctance to glory", writing: "It brings an urge to say, in response, 'Look, take some credit already!'" Adichie also noted that Obama had a tendency to be overly self-critical, in a manner she described as "darker than self-awareness but not as dark as self-loathing". She also notes that the extreme self-awareness may have contributed to his "wholesome humanity" and "deep generosity", including his praises of those around him. Adichie continued by writing: "And yet for all his ruthless self-assessment, there is very little of what the best memoirs bring: true self-revelation." Adichie blamed this on Obama's detached style, saying that "[i]t is as if, because he is leery of exaggerated emotion, emotion itself is tamped down." She later stated that the best parts of the memoir are the surprising "gossipy" bits.

In an article for Slate published on November 20, 2020, Laura Miller summarized the book's initial reviews by stating it is "admirable but, depending on their viewpoints, insufficiently intimate, lacking racial indignation, or just a bit glum." She also noted that many of the book's critics complained about the book's length, and that despite its length, it is the first of multiple volumes. Miller notes that the book has a tendency to provide "what some consider an excess of background information" when describing situations and protocols. The review goes on to note that many of the explanations can seem "remedial" for "a practiced observer of the executive branch", that Miller acknowledges is "often the sort of person who gets asked to weigh in on such a book".

Philip Terzian wrote in The Wall Street Journal that "[a]s a matter of substance", the book "tells us little that a newspaper reader wouldn't already know" and that it "can get monotonous at times", going on to write that the "chapters unfold in a formulaic, curiously uniform, fashion". In another review, Edward Luce wrote in the Financial Times that the book's main "deficiency" is that Obama is "too reasonable, almost to the point of detachment".

Tshilidzi Marwala in Cape Argus, The Star and Voices 360 wrote that Obama, like light, has a dual nature - the "phenomenon" and the politician. Obama the politician achieved many things in a hostile environment, while Obama the phenomenon was inspirational and won the Nobel Prize for no other reason than the fact that he was a phenomenon. He concluded that Obama the politician triumphed over Obama the phenomenon.

Dov Lipman wrote in JNS that "In his new memoir, the former US president misleads readers in a way that will forever shape their negative perspective of the Jewish state".

=== Awards ===
Among other acclamations, the book won the 2020 Goodreads Choice Awards for Best Memoir and Autobiography. It was named one of "The 10 Best Books of 2020" by The New York Times Book Review, one of "50 notable works of nonfiction in 2020" by The Washington Post, one of the "Best politics books of 2020" by The Guardian, and one of the "Best Political Books of 2020" by Marie Claire.

The unabridged audiobook version, produced by Random House Audio and narrated by the author, won the 2022 Audie Award for Narration by the Author, and was a finalist for the 2022 Audie Award for Audiobook of the Year. The audiobook was also nominated for the Grammy Award for Best Spoken Word Album at the 64th Annual Grammy Awards in 2022.

== Publication ==
The book was released on November 17, 2020, soon after the national elections, in hardcover, digital and audiobook formats. The bestselling memoir was published by Crown Publishing Group in the United States and Canada while Viking Press served as publisher in other English-speaking countries. Penguin, the parent company of both Viking and Crown, has also translated the book into over twenty languages.

=== Sales ===
The book was the New York Times best-seller for the weeks of December 6, 2020, December 13, 2020, and December 20, 2020, and was the Publishers Weekly Number One Best Seller Overall for nine consecutive weeks. The book's first printing was set for a run of 3.4 million copies in the U.S. and Canada. There will be 2.5 million copies printed for international readers. The New York Times described the book as being "virtually guaranteed" to be the year's top seller. On November 18, Penguin Books reported that the book sold 887,000 copies in the United States and Canada its first day, surpassing the previous record held by his wife Michelle's 2018 book Becoming, which sold 725,000 in its first day. By November 24, 2020, the book had sold over 1.7 million copies in North America, breaking the record for first week sales of a presidential memoir. The initial 3.4 million copy run was increased to 4.3 million due to high demand. The first 3.3 million units of the book were sold within its first month and ABC News commented that it "is well on its way to becoming the best-selling presidential memoir in modern times" on December 16, 2020.

=== Release details (English) ===
In English, the book has been released in paperback, hardcover, eBook, and audio versions. The book was published by Crown Publishing Group in the United States and Canada and by Viking Press in the United Kingdom, Ireland, Australia, New Zealand, India, and South Africa. The unabridged audiobook version of the book, which runs for 28 hours and 10 minutes and is read by Obama himself, is also available on Audible. It is the third presidential memoir read by its author, following White House Diary by Jimmy Carter and Decision Points by George W. Bush.

- Paperback:
  - Obama, Barack (December 8, 2020). A Promised Land. Vol. 1. New York: Crown. ISBN 978-0-525-63376-1. OCLC 1223521681.
- Hardcover:
  - Obama, Barack (November 17, 2020). A Promised Land. Vol. 1. New York: Crown. ISBN 978-1-5247-6316-9. OCLC 1196086067.
  - Obama, Barack (November 17, 2020). A Promised Land. Vol. 1. London: Viking. ISBN 978-0-241-49151-5. OCLC 1196244052.
- eBook:
  - Obama, Barack (November 17, 2020). A Promised Land. Vol. 1. New York: Crown. ISBN 978-1-5247-6318-3. OCLC 1196086067.
  - Obama, Barack (November 17, 2020). A Promised Land. Vol. 1. London: Viking. ISBN 978-0-2419-9141-1. OCLC 1196244052.
- Audiobook:
  - Obama, Barack (November 17, 2020). A Promised Land. Vol. 1. New York: Random House Audio. ISBN 978-0-525-63372-3. OCLC 1222783751.
  - Obama, Barack (November 17, 2020). A Promised Land. Vol. 1. London: Penguin Random House. ISBN 978-0-241-99142-8. OCLC 1222783751.
- CD:
  - Obama, Barack (November 24, 2020). A Promised Land. Vol. 1. New York: Penguin Random House. ISBN 978-0-525-63371-6. OCLC 1201544122.
  - Obama, Barack (November 24, 2020). A Promised Land. Vol. 1. London: Penguin Random House. ISBN 978-0-241-99143-5. OCLC 1201544122.

=== Translations ===
Alongside the English original, Penguin Random House announced in September 2020 that 24 translations will be published: Albanian, Arabic, Bulgarian, Chinese, Czech, Danish, Dutch, Finnish, French, German, Greek, Hebrew, Hungarian, Italian, Japanese, Korean, Lithuanian, Norwegian, Persian, Polish, Portuguese, Romanian, Spanish, Swedish, and Vietnamese.

Language	Title	Translator(s)	Publisher	Publication date	Print	eBook	Audiobook
Spanish	Una tierra prometida	Francisco José Ramos Mena; Efrén Del Valle Peñamil; Marcos Pérez Sánchez; Carmen Mercedes Cáceres; Andrés Barba Muñiz	Debate/Penguin Random House Grupo Editorial	November 17, 2020	ISBN 978-8-499-92974-3 (hardcover); ISBN 978-1-644-73257-1 (paperback)	ISBN 978-8-499-92975-0	ISBN 978-8-417-63694-4 (Narrated by Víctor Sabi)
Finnish	Luvattu maa	Kyösti Karvonen; Seppo Raudaskoski; Ilkka Rekiaro	Otava Publishing Company	November 17, 2020	ISBN 978-9-511-32084-5 (hardcover); ISBN 978-9-511-30707-5 (paperback)	ISBN 978-9-511-39276-7	ISBN 978-9-511-39371-9 (Narrated by Jani Toivola)
German	Ein verheißenes Land	Sylvia Bieker; Harriet Fricke; Stephan Gebauer; Stephan Kleiner; Elke Link; Thorsten Schmidt; Henriette Zeltner-Shane	Penguin Verlag/Penguin Random House Verlagsgruppe	November 17, 2020	ISBN 978-3-3286-0062-6 (hardcover)	ISBN 978-3-6412-3036-4	ISBN 978-3-8445-2965-4 (Narrated by Andreas Fröhlich)
Dutch	Een beloofd land	Rebekka W.R. Bremmer; Bep Fontijn; Frans Reusink; Edzard Krol	Hollands Diep	November 17, 2020	ISBN 978-9-048-84074-8 (hardcover)	ISBN 978-9-048-84075-5	
Romanian	Pământul făgăduinței	Diana Popescu Marin	Editura Litera	November 17, 2020	ISBN 978-6-063-36679-6 (hardcover)		
Italian	Una terra promessa	Giuseppe Maugeri; Maria Grazia Galli; Paolo Lucca	Garzanti	November 17, 2020	ISBN 978-8-811-14987-3 (hardcover)	ISBN 978-8-811-81842-7	
Swedish	Ett förlovat land	Manne Svensson	Albert Bonniers Förlag	November 17, 2020	ISBN 978-9-100-17760-7 (hardcover)	ISBN 978-9-100-18838-2	
Danish	Et forjættet land	Anders Juel Michelsen; Karsten Nielsen	Lindhardt og Ringhof	November 17, 2020	ISBN 978-8-711-69434-3 (hardcover)		
Norwegian	Et lovet land	Eivind Lilleskjæret; Gunnar Nyquist	Cappelen Damm	November 17, 2020	ISBN 978-8-202-66272-1 (hardcover)	ISBN 978-8-202-70177-2	
Modern Greek	Γη της επαγγελίας	Μάνος Τζιρίτας	Athens Bookstore Publications	November 17, 2020	ISBN 978-6-188-40326-0 (hardcover)		
Lithuanian	Pažadėtoji žemė	Asta Tobulevičienė; Daumantas Gadeikis; Jovita Liutkutė	Alma Littera	November 17, 2020	ISBN 978-6-090-14337-7 (hardcover)		
Hungarian	Egy ígéret földje	Judit Darnyik; Bread Anna; Tamás Pétersz	HVG Könyvek Kiadó [HVG Publishing Co.]	November 17, 2020	ISBN 978-9-635-65005-7 (hardcover)		
Portuguese (Brazil)	Uma Terra Prometida	Berilo Vargas; Cássio de Arantes Leite; Denise Bottmann; Jorio Dauster	Companhia das Letras	November 17, 2020	ISBN 978-8-535-93396-3 (paperback)	ISBN 978-6-557-82032-2	
Portuguese (Portugal)	Uma Terra Prometida		Objectiva/Penguin Random House Grupo Editorial	November 17, 2020	ISBN 978-9-897-84135-4 (paperback)	ISBN 978-9-897-84152-1	
Bulgarian	Обетована земя	Marin Zagorchev	СофтПрес [SofPress]	November 17, 2020	ISBN 978-6-191-51635-3 (hardcover)		
Hebrew	ארץ מובטחת	Edith Schorer; Inbal Sagiv-Nakdimon; Ofer Kober	ידיעות ספרים [Yedioth Books]	November 17, 2020	ISBN 978-965-564-690-0 (paperback)		
Polish	Ziemia obiecana	Dariusz Żukowski	Agora Publishing House	November 17, 2020	ISBN 978-83-268-4583-3 (paperback)	ISBN 978-83-268-3413-4	
Traditional Chinese	應許之地：歐巴馬回憶錄	陳琇玲; 鍾玉玨; 楊明暐; 陳文和; 林步昇	商業周刊 [Business Weekly Group]	November 17, 2020	ISBN 978-98-655-1925-4 (paperback)		
French	Une terre promise	Pierre Demarty; Charles Recoursé; Nicolas Richard	Editions Fayard	November 17, 2020	ISBN 978-22-137-0612-2 (hardcover)	ISBN 978-22-137-0788-4	
Persian	سرزمین موعود	Mohammad Memarian	Mehrandish Publications	November 17, 2020	ISBN 978-964-0021-59-0		
Korean	약속의 땅	Rho Seung-young	Woongjin Jisik House	July 28th, 2021	ISBN 978-89-01-25186-8 (hardcover)	ISBN 978-89-01-25215-5	
Vietnamese	Miền Đất Hứa	Đỗ Hùng	Dân Trí Publisher		ISBN 978-604-344-540-4		

== See also ==
- List of American political memoirs
- List of autobiographies by presidents of the United States
- List of memoirs by first ladies of the United States
