= Mark Zwonitzer =

American author and documentary filmmaker

Mark Lewis Zwonitzer (born August 28, 1962) is an American author and documentary filmmaker.

== Writing ==
Zwonitzer briefly worked as a fact checker for Esquire before becoming a researcher for Richard Ben Cramer's book What It Takes: The Way to the White House.

Zwonitzer has written two non-fiction biographies. Will You Miss Me When I'm Gone?, written with Charles Hirshberg, is a biography of the traditional American folk music group, the Carter Family. The book was a finalist for the National Book Critics Circle Award in the biography/autobiography category in 2002. One reviewer wrote, "The Carter Family finally get their due in documentary filmmaker Mark Zwonitzer's comprehensive biography... offering background on the social, economic and technological developments that spawned American folk, country and rock music."

Zwonitzer also worked with Joe Biden on his two memoirs, the 2007 Promises to Keep and the 2017 Promise Me, Dad.

The Statesman and The Storyteller: John Hay, Mark Twain and The Rise of American Imperialism was published April 26, 2016, from Algonquin Books, an imprint of Workman Publishing.

== Films and Television ==
Zwonitzer has worked in film and television primarily as a writer for non-fiction shows and films. He worked for the American Experience television series on PBS from 1994-2016 as a writer, director, and producer. For his work for PBS, he received Emmy nominations for Outstanding Achievement in Non-Fiction Filmmaking and Outstanding Achievement in Writing.
