= Theodore Roosevelt (disambiguation) =

Theodore Roosevelt (1858–1919) was the president of the United States from 1901 to 1909.

Theodore Roosevelt may also refer to:

- Theodore Roosevelt Sr. (1831–1878), the president's father
- Theodore Roosevelt Jr. (1887–1944), the president's eldest son
- Theodore Roosevelt IV (1914–2001), the president's grandson
- Theodore Roosevelt V (born 1942), the president's great-grandson

== See also ==
- USS Theodore Roosevelt, several ships
- Theodore Roosevelt: An Autobiography, an autobiographical book by the President of the United States
