= Mayfield, Delaware =

Unincorporated community in Delaware, United States

- Unincorporated community
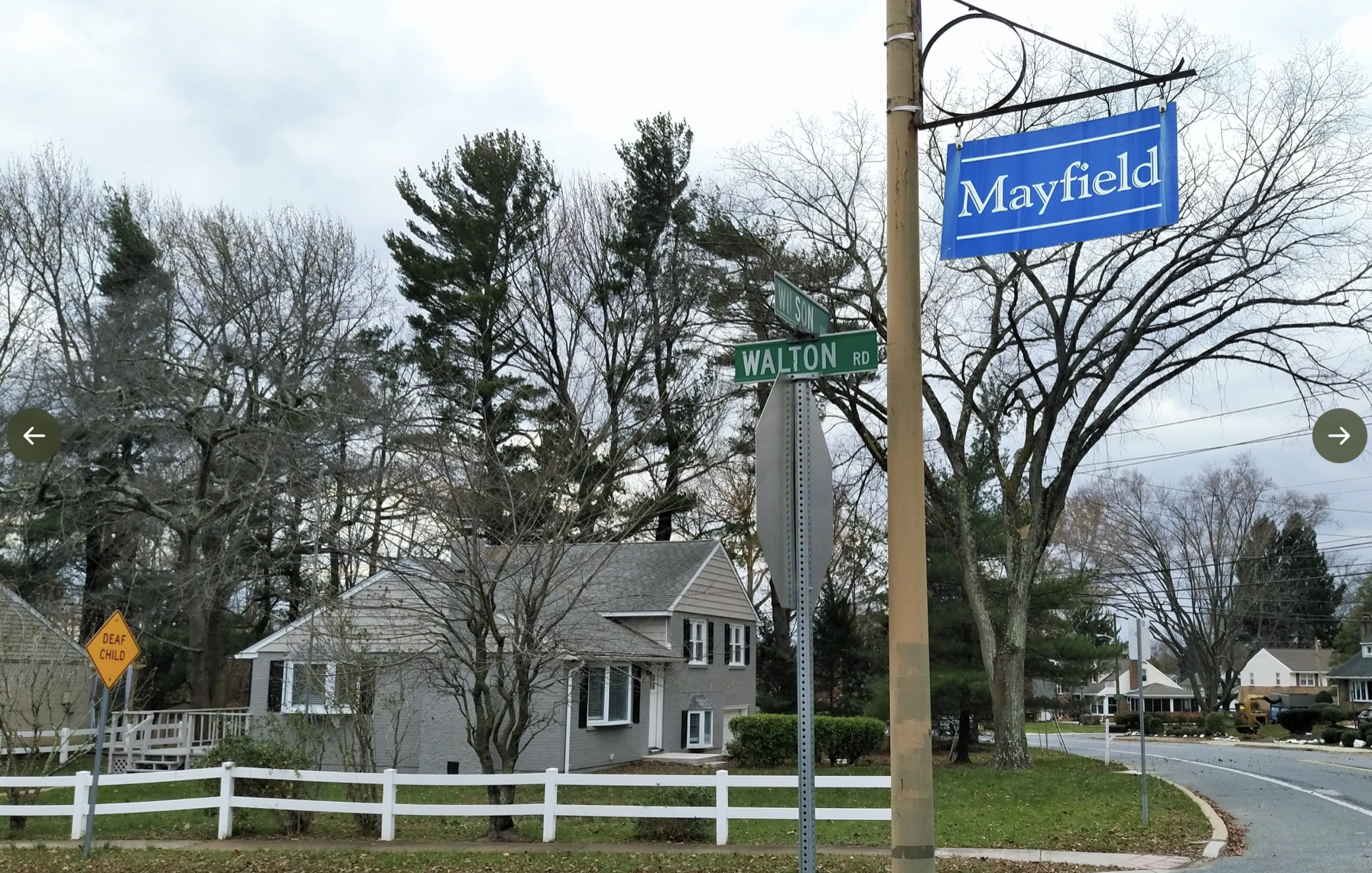
- Intersection of Wilson Road and Walton Road in Mayfield

- Location within Delaware Location within the United States
- Coordinates: 39°47′50″N 75°30′29″W
- Country: United States
- State: Delaware
- County: New Castle
- Elevation: 302 ft (92 m)
- Time zone: UTC-5 (Eastern (EST))
  - Summer (DST): UTC-4 (EDT)
- Postal code: 19803
- Area code: 302
- GNIS feature ID: 217124

Mayfield is a suburban community in New Castle County, Delaware, United States. It was the teenage home of former President Joe Biden.

== Geography ==
Mayfield is located southwest of the intersection of Delaware Route 3 and Wilson Road, 4.5 miles (7.2 km) northeast of Wilmington in the Brandywine Hundred.

== History ==
Mayfield was developed in the 1950s and is described as being at the time a "rapidly growing middle-class community", where "many fathers were accountants, lawyers, and chemists..."

Mayfield is the site of the teenage home of U.S. politician Joe Biden, who moved to Mayfield in 1955 with his family when he was 13 and lived in a typical split-level house on Wilson Road. In his book Promises to Keep he says of Mayfield: "The houses in my neighborhood, Mayfield, had sprouted just a few years earlier from what had been a flat and treeless farm field. There wasn't a spot of shade in the neighborhood. The streets were smooth, fast, and narrow—built for speed. They were great for bike races and whiffle ball. But everything there felt squared off, as if in perfect obeisance to the suburban God of Right Angles. Uniformity ruled. Every roof had the same pitch."
