= American war in Afghanistan =

American war in Afghanistan may refer to:

- War in Afghanistan (2001–2021)
- The American War in Afghanistan: A History an article about this book written by Carter Malkasian.

== See also ==
- American War (disambiguation)
