= American War =

American War may refer to:

- American War (novel) a 2017 novel by Omar El Akkad
- Vietnam War, known in Vietnam as the American War (1955–1975)
- American Revolutionary War or American War of Independence (1775–1783), known in Great Britain at the time as the American War

== See also ==
- List of conflicts in the United States
- List of wars involving the United States
- American Civil War (1861–1865)
- American war in Afghanistan (disambiguation)
- War of 1812 (disambiguation)
