= Kings Row =

1942 film directed by Sam Wood

- Movie poster
- Directed by: Sam Wood
- Screenplay by: Casey Robinson
- Based on: Kings Row; 1940 novel by Henry Bellamann
- Produced by: Hal B. Wallis (executive producer)
- Starring: Ann Sheridan; Robert Cummings; Ronald Reagan; Betty Field; Charles Coburn; Claude Rains; Judith Anderson; Maria Ouspenskaya
- Cinematography: James Wong Howe
- Edited by: Ralph Dawson
- Music by: Erich Wolfgang Korngold
- Color process: Black and white
- Production company: Warner Bros. Pictures
- Distributed by: Warner Bros. Pictures
- Release date: February 2, 1942 (New York City)
- Running time: 127 minutes
- Language: English
- Budget: $1,081,698
- Box office: $5,093,000

Kings Row is a 1942 American psychological romantic period drama film starring Ann Sheridan, Robert Cummings, Ronald Reagan and Betty Field that tells a story of young people growing up in a small American town at the turn of the twentieth century.

It was directed by Sam Wood and was adapted by Casey Robinson from a best-selling 1940 novel of the same name by Henry Bellamann. The musical score was composed by Erich Wolfgang Korngold, and the cinematographer was James Wong Howe. The supporting cast features Charles Coburn, Claude Rains, Judith Anderson and Maria Ouspenskaya.

== Plot ==
In the small midwestern town of Kings Row, five children grow up together in the 1890s: Parris Mitchell, a polite, clever little boy who lives with his grandmother; pretty blonde Cassandra Tower, daughter of the secretive Dr. Alexander Tower and a mother that is seen only through the upstairs window; the orphaned but wealthy and fun-loving Drake McHugh who is best friends with Parris; Louise Gordon, daughter of the town physician Dr. Henry Gordon; and the tomboy Randy Monaghan, from the wrong side of the tracks, whose father, Tom, is a railroad worker.

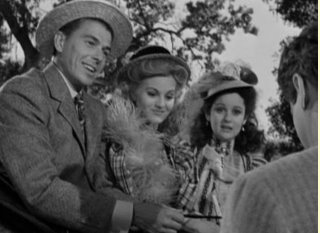
Drake McHugh (Ronald Reagan) with two lady friends in Kings Row

Parris is both friends with and is drawn to Cassandra whom the other children avoid because her family is "strange". They play together regularly. The boys are best friends and Randy plays with them sometimes. When Dr. Tower takes Cassie out of school and she is confined at home, Parris does not see her for many years.

He finally meets her again when she opens the door for him to begin his medical studies under Dr. Tower's tutelage. However, she is very hesitant and says almost nothing. The next morning, Parris' best friend, Drake, says that he intends to marry Louise who is in love with him as well despite the disapproval of her father, Dr. Gordon. Louise, however, refuses to defy her parents and will not marry him. As Parris continues his studies with Dr. Tower, he and Cassie begin a secret romance, seeing each other at Drake's house. But he and Dr. Tower have a good relationship as well. Dr. Tower has interested Parris in psychiatry which he intends to study in Vienna. Parris' grandmother becomes ill from cancer and dies as he is about to go overseas for medical school. Parris wants to marry Cassie after he returns from his training. One night Cassie comes desperately to him, begging him to take her with him. When Parris hesitates, she runs back home.

The next morning, Drake learns that Dr. Tower has poisoned Cassie and shot himself and has left his entire estate to Parris. Parris finds Dr. Tower's notebook which showed that he killed Cassie because he believed he saw early signs that she might go insane like her mother and he wanted to prevent Parris from ruining his life by marrying her, just as Tower's life had been ruined by marrying Cassie's mother.

While Parris is in Vienna, Drake begins to court Randy. Drake's trust fund is stolen by a dishonest bank president and he is forced into a menial position with the railroad. His legs are injured in an accident and amputated by Dr. Gordon. Drake and Randy marry but he is embittered by the loss of his legs and refuses to leave his bed. Parris exchanges letters with Randy and tells her how she might best support Drake emotionally. Parris allows them to move into the Towers' estate. They decide to borrow money and start a business building houses for working families. Parris returns from Vienna to Kings Row to see Drake. But when Parris suggests they build a home in their own development away from the railroad tracks and the sounds of the trains that plague Drake, Drake becomes hysterical and makes Randy swear to never make him leave the room.

When Parris learns that Dr. Gordon has died, leaving the town with no doctor, he decides to stay in Kings Row. Louise reveals that her father amputated Drake's legs because he hated Drake and thought it was his duty to "punish wickedness" which would prevent him from ever marrying his daughter. Parris at first wishes to withhold the truth from Drake, fearing it will destroy his fragile recovery. He considers confining Louise to a mental institution (even though she's not insane) to prevent her and the community learning the truth.

When out walking, he sees what appears to be an apparition of Cassie by the pond the two of them used to go to. It is Elise who has moved into his childhood home with her father. Parris grows close to them both and discusses the problem regarding Louise with Elise. She persuades him to treat Drake like any other patient rather than his best friend. Parris frees Louise to reveal all she knows and tells Drake what happened and why. Drake reacts with laughter and defiance, summoning a renewed will to live. Clear of conscience and reinvigorated as a fledgling psychiatrist, Parris rushes to his former home and into Elise's arms.

== Cast ==
- Ann Sheridan as Randy Monaghan
- Robert Cummings as Parris Mitchell
- Ronald Reagan as Drake McHugh
- Betty Field as Cassandra Tower
- Charles Coburn as Dr. Henry Gordon
- Claude Rains as Dr. Alexander Tower
- Judith Anderson as Mrs. Harriet Gordon
- Ann Todd as Randy Monaghan as a girl
- Scotty Beckett as Parris Mitchell as a boy
- Douglas Croft as Drake McHugh as a boy
- Mary Thomas as Cassandra Tower as a girl
- Nancy Coleman as Louise Gordon
- Kaaren Verne as Elise Sandor
- Maria Ouspenskaya as Madame von Eln
- Harry Davenport as Colonel Skeffington
- Ernest Cossart as Pa Monaghan
- Ilka Grüning as Anna
- Minor Watson as Sam Winters
- Emory Parnell as Harley Davis
- Henry Blair as Willie MacIntosh
- Julie Warren as Poppy Ross
- Mary Scott as Jinny Ross
- Pat Moriarity as Tod Monaghan

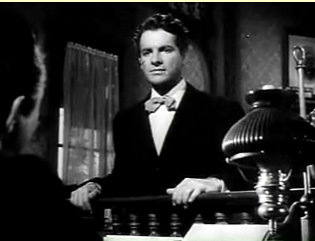
Dedicated young doctor Parris Mitchell (Robert Cummings) is secretly in love with his mentor's daughter

== Production ==
Wolfgang Reinhardt refused an assignment to produce the film, saying, "As far as plot is concerned, the material in Kings Row is for the most part either censurable or too gruesome and depressing to be used. The hero finding out that his girl has been carrying on incestuous relations with her father... a host of moronic or otherwise mentally diseased characters... people dying from cancer, suicides–these are the principal elements of the story."

=== The Hays Code ===
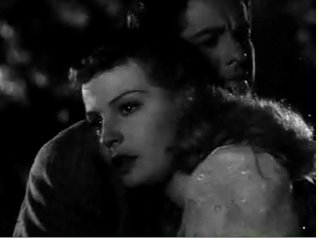
Parris (Robert Cummings) and Cassandra (Betty Field); their illicit romance disturbed the Hays Office

A film adaptation of Bellamann's controversial novel, modeled on his home town of Fulton, Missouri, presented significant problems for movie industry censors who sought to bring the film into conformity with the Hays Code. Screenwriter Casey Robinson believed the project was hopeless because of the Code. Producer Hal B. Wallis said that Robinson felt "I was crazy to have bought so downbeat a property." Wallis urged him to reconsider and Robinson realized that he could turn this into the story of "an idealistic young doctor challenged by the realities of a cruel and horrifying world."

Joseph Breen, director of the Production Code Authority which administered the Hays Code wrote the producers that "To attempt to translate such a story to the screen even though it be re-written to conform to the provisions of the Production Code is, in our judgment, a very questionable undertaking from the standpoint of the good and welfare of this industry."

Breen objected to "illicit sexual relationships" between characters in the movie "without sufficient compensating moral values". He also objected to "the general suggestion of loose sex...which carries throughout the entire script." Breen was further concerned about the characterization of Cassandra as a victim of incest with her father, the mercy killing of the grandmother by Parris and "the sadistic characterization of Dr. Gordon."

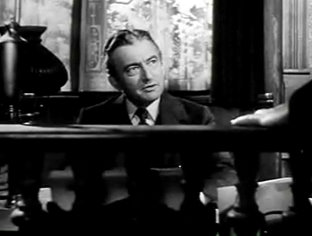
Dr. Alexander Tower (Claude Rains) commits incest with his daughter Cassandra (Betty Field) in the novel. Censors forbade that in the film.

Breen said that any screenplay, no matter how well done, would likely bring condemnation of the film industry "from decent people everywhere" because of "the fact that it stems from so thoroughly questionable a novel. He said that the script was being referred to his superior, Will Hays, "for a decision as to the acceptability of any production based upon the novel, Kings Row."

Robinson, Wallis and associate producer David Lewis met with Breen to resolve these issues with Wallis saying that the film would "illustrate how a doctor could relieve the internal destruction of a stricken community." Breen said that his office would approve the film if all references to incest, nymphomania, euthanasia and homosexuality which the novel suggested, be removed. All references to nude bathing were to be eliminated and "the suggestion of a sex affair between Randy and Drake will be eliminated entirely." It was agreed that Dr. Tower would know about the affair between Cassandra and Parris and "that this had something to do with his killing of the girl."

After several drafts were rejected, Robinson was able to satisfy Breen.

=== Casting ===
Twentieth-Century Fox originally sought to buy Bellamann's novel as a vehicle for Henry Fonda. Philip Reed, Rex Downing, and Tyrone Power were considered for the role of Parris. But then, Warner Bros. Pictures purchased the film rights to the novel, and in April 1941, Robert Cummings was mentioned as the leading favorite if Power could not be borrowed.

According to producer David Lewis, the first choice was Tyrone Power but he was under contract to Fox, and Daryl Zanuck wanted two commitments from Warner Bros. contract star Errol Flynn in exchange for Power, and Warners were not willing to do that. Sam Wood liked working with Cummings on The Devil and Miss Jones and Lewis felt "He was a little old for the part of Parris Mitchell but, in spite of being known as a comedian, he was a pretty good actor. Eventually we agreed on him." Cummings did a screen test and by May had the role. Cummings was busy working on a film with Deanna Durbin, but Wallis and Wood were willing to postpone shooting for him. In September, filming was shut down for a week as Cummings was recalled to do reshoots on the Durbin film. Lewis later wrote that he liked Cummings' performance if not his make up, adding "Tyrone Power would have brought a great personality to the role of Parris; he would have been a much stronger character than Cummings and the film would have been better as a result."

Lewis said Wood wanted Ginger Rogers to play Randy "but I knew this was our big chance to make a star of Ann Sheridan, for whom I had the greatest admiration, and I held out for her."

Ida Lupino, Olivia de Havilland and Ginger Rogers were initially considered for the role of Cassandra. Director Sam Wood pushed hard to cast Lupino, saying that she "has a natural something that Cassie should have." Wood believed that de Havilland, who refused the role, was too mature for the part. Lupino also refused it because of Wallis' emphatic arguments that it was "beneath her as an artist." Bette Davis wanted the part but the studio was against it because they believed that she would dominate the movie. Davis later suggested Betty Field. Among the other actresses considered for Cassandra were Katharine Hepburn, Claudette Colbert, Paulette Goddard, Rosalind Russell, Marlene Dietrich, Susan Hayward, Adele Longmire, Marsha Hunt, Laraine Day, Susan Peters, Joan Leslie, Gene Tierney and Priscilla Lane.

James Stephenson was originally cast as Dr. Tower but died, and was replaced by Claude Rains.

Before Ronald Reagan was cast, the studio considered John Garfield for the role of Drake McHugh. So were Dennis Morgan, Eddie Albert, Ralph Bellamy, Robert Preston, and Franchot Tone. Although Reagan became a star as a result of his performance, he was unable to capitalize on his success because he was drafted into the U.S. Army to serve in World War II. He never regained the star status that he had achieved from his performance in the film.

=== Filming ===
Filming started in July 1941 at the Warner Bros. Studios Burbank and continued until October.

The pivotal scene in which Drake McHugh wakes up to find his legs amputated posed an acting challenge for Reagan who was supposed to say "Where's the rest of me?" in a convincing manner. In City of Nets, Otto Friedrich noted that the movie had a formidable array of acting talent and the scene in which Reagan saw that his legs were gone was his "one great opportunity." Reagan recalled in his memoir that he had "neither the experience nor talent to fake it," so he undertook exhaustive research, talking to doctors and to people with disabilities and practicing the line every chance he got.

On the night before the scene was shot, he had little sleep so he looked suitably worn out. Sam Wood shot the scene without rehearsal. He called out for Randy, which was not in the script, but Ann Sheridan was there and responded. The scene was extremely effective and there was no need for another take.

David Lewis called William Cameron Menzies:

Probably the most brilliant man I have ever known in his field. He sketched the entire production shot-by-shot, creating the most imaginative sets and lighting, and did every camera setup for Sam, who turned out to be an unusual director. He knew nothing about the camera, nothing about script, and little about casting. Not only was Menzies on the set for everything, Sam rarely let me out of his sight, either. Before shooting he would say to me, “What is this scene about?” I would tell him and he would whisper in an actor’s ear the magic words that brought forth a fine performance. In spite of his unorthodox method of working, I thought him worth his money.

According to Lewis, Wood and Menzies "got along like a dream. Basically, Sam knew how much he needed Bill, though he never admitted it openly. It was Bill who directed the camera crew, the set constructionists and designers—in fact, the whole technical end of the picture was his. Sam, in contrast, would sit on his ass and wait for Bill to finish. Yet he was brilliant in the way he could grasp the meaning of a scene and whisper it in an actor’s ear."

== Themes ==
Bellaman, a professor at Vassar College, was a disciple of Honoré de Balzac. His novel was in the tradition of Winesburg, Ohio and was a forerunner of the popular 1950s novel Peyton Place.

The film begins with a billboard promoting Kings Row as "A Good Town. A Good, Clean Town. A Good Town to Live In and a Good Place to Raise Your Children." In his book City of Nets, author Otto Friedrich says that beneath the tranquil, small-town exterior was a "roiling inferno of fraud, corruption, treachery, hypocrisy, class warfare and ill-suppressed sex of all varieties: adultery, sadism, homosexuality, incest."

The film is a eulogy for American small town life in the Victorian era. At one point a character laments at seeing Parris' grandmother getting older: "A whole way of life. A way of gentleness and honor and dignity. These things are going... and they may never come back to this world."

== Musical score ==
The film's musical score by Erich Wolfgang Korngold (best known for Errol Flynn's swashbuckler films) was so popular with the public that the Warner Brothers Music Department drafted a form letter response to questions about recordings and sheet music. At the time, film scores for movie dramas were not published or recorded for commercial distribution.

A soundtrack was not commercially available until 1979 when Chalfont Records, with the composer's son George Korngold as producer and an orchestra conducted by Charles Gerhardt, made an early digital recording. Subsequently, the original soundtrack with the composer conducting was released from an optical recording.

Kings Row is considered one of Korngold's more popular compositions. The White House requested the original orchestral score for Ronald Reagan's presidential inauguration. Academy Award winning film composer John Williams drew inspiration from the film's soundtrack for his famous Star Wars opening theme.

Before releasing the film, the Los Angeles Daily News reported that Henry Bellamann "heads west to help Erich Wolfgang Korngold on the scoring" of the film, and that Bellamann used to be on the faculty of the Curtis Institute of Music in Philadelphia. This led Korngold to send a sarcastic letter to the head of studio publicity at Warner Brothers writing "Seriously, should I really stop working and wait for the arrival of Mr. Bellamann? ... however, if he shouldn't arrive in time to help me, I shall certainly be ready to 'head east" Perhaps, I could help him in writing his new book!"

== Reception ==
=== Box office ===
According to Variety, the film earned $2,350,000 in rentals in the US in 1942. According to Warner Bros figures it made $3,143,000 domestically and $1,950,000 foreign.

=== Critical response ===
Dr. Henry Gordon (Charles Coburn) confronts McHugh (Ronald Reagan), whose legs he later needlessly amputates. The film's "gloom" dismayed the New York Times film critic Bosley Crowther.

The New York Times film critic Bosley Crowther panned Kings Row which he described as being as "gloomy and ponderous" as the novel upon which it was based. "Just why the Warners attempted a picture of this sort in these times and just why the corps of high priced artists which they employed for it did such a bungling job", Crowther wrote, "are questions which they are probably mulling more anxiously than any one else." Crowther wrote that the film "turgidly unfolds on the screen", and is "one of the bulkiest blunders to come out of Hollywood in some time". The performances, particularly Cummings', were, he wrote, "totally lacking in conviction". The film, he wrote, "just shows a lot of people feeling bad".

The Chicago Tribune saw Sheridan and Reagan as "real and believable" in their roles and that Cummings did "the best that could be done". Otherwise, the film was described as "a long and dreary melodrama in two parts.., years of misery and maladjustment to young womanhood and young manhood....Kings Row is the story of a town with a 'right' and 'wrong' side of the tracks and the story of the town's inhabitants is a coat of many colors and is outstanding as being a gangrenous yellow."

The Brooklyn Eagle was likewise negative: "Kings Row is packed with the best talent at the Warners command…. David Lewis has given it all an unstinted production and James Wong Howe, one of Hollywood's best shooters, has turned the cameras on it. So full of great promise, Kings Row came last night to the Astor Theater…. It should have been great but it isn't….Kings Row never comes to life. Its characters are made of clay…. It is hard to feel sorry for them for they are unreal. It is even harder to be happy for them for there's precious little to be happy about. Kings Row, to say the best for it, is a frightening town with a disturbing citizenry…. There might have been a point to all this grimness. It stood up well in the book even amid the grimness of war. But at the Astor, the mood takes precedence over the characters and their drama. Kings Row is more horrifying than poignant. It seems to be played more for the chills of fright than for the warmth of drama.

On the movie review aggregation website Rotten Tomatoes, 100% of 17 critics gave the film a positive review with an average rating of 7.90/10, earning it a "Fresh" score.

Time Out Film Guide described the film as "one of the great melodramas" and "as compulsive and perverse as any election, a veritable Mount Rushmore of emotional and physical cripples, including a surgeon with a penchant for unnecessary amputations, a girl who 'made friends on one side of the tracks and made love on the other'."

TV Guide wrote that Kings Row was "one of the most memorable melodramas of its day", in that it portrayed "a small town not with the poignancy and little joys of Thornton Wilder's Our Town but rather in grim, often tragic tones". The magazine described the film as "one of director Wood's finest films" and praised Robinson's screenplay "even if he cut out a death from cancer, deleted a mercy killing, and toned down the narrative's homosexual angle". It described Korngold's score as "haunting" and the sets "quite stunning". James Wong Howe's "gorgeous cinematography, meanwhile, maintains many layers of drama in deep focus, as befits this brooding tapestry".

Lewis wrote "The cast of the film was brilliant, with the possible exception of Robert Cummings... Wood had done his job superbly, and Menzies’ work was fabulous. All in all, I thought the film had something extraordinary about it and still do. It was honest, a story of deep and lasting relationships, and very lifelike in its development. On the main | think it contains some of my best work."

=== Accolades ===
Kings Row was nominated for Academy Awards for Best Cinematography, Black-and-White (James Wong Howe), Best Director and Best Picture (Outstanding Motion Picture).

The film is recognized by American Film Institute in these lists:

- 2005: AFI's 100 Years...100 Movie Quotes:
  - Drake McHugh: "Where's the rest of me?" – Nominated
- 2005: AFI's 100 Years of Film Scores – Nominated

== Legacy ==
In the film, Reagan's character, Drake McHugh, has both legs amputated by a sadistic surgeon, played by Coburn. When he comes to, following the operation, he gasps in shock, disbelief, and horror, "Where's the rest of me?" Reagan used that line as the title of his 1965 autobiography. Reagan and most film critics considered Kings Row his best film. Reagan called the film a "slightly sordid but moving yarn" that "made me a star."

== Television series ==
The film was adapted into a 1955 television series, with Jack Kelly in Cummings' role and Robert Horton performing Reagan's part. The show appeared as one of three rotating series on the earliest William T. Orr production, Warner Bros. Presents. Kings Row ran for seven episodes.

== Notes ==
- Lewis, David (1993). Curtis, James (ed.). The Creative Producer. Metuchen: Scarecrow Press. ISBN 0-8108-2720-4.
