= Mr. Buchanan's Administration on the Eve of the Rebellion =

1866 book by James Buchanan

- Title page for Mr. Buchanan's Administration
- Author: James Buchanan
- Language: English
- Publisher: D. Appleton & Company
- Publication date: January 1866
- Publication place: New York

Mr. Buchanan's Administration on the Eve of the Rebellion (1866) is an autobiography written by former United States President James Buchanan. The book focuses specifically on the work of his administration in the immediate lead-up to the American Civil War. Though it is an accounting of his presidency, Buchanan rarely writes with first-person pronouns and disavowed the use of any private correspondence. The book instead proceeds as a polemic in which Buchanan argues that his tenure did little to cause the war.

Buchanan left the presidency in the midst of the crisis over Fort Sumter and sought opportunities to defend his record. He began work on the book in 1861, expending extensive effort and money to gather sources on which to base his arguments. Against the urging of friends—who argued that the Republican Congress would not appreciate Buchanan's self-defense—he continued to argue for his record in public, including in public correspondence with General Winfield Scott published in the National Intelligencer in 1862. Buchanan waited until the end of the war to submit his manuscript. Though he expected its release in October 1865, publisher D. Appleton & Company delayed release until the following January.

== Contents ==
The book proceeds in 13 chapters, each discussing a separate series of events that helped lead to the Civil War.

1. "The Rise and Progress of Anti-Slavery Agitation"
2. The Compromise of 1850
3. William H. Seward's 1858 "Irrepressible Conflict" speech, The Impending Crisis of the South, the 1859 raid on Harper's Ferry, and the Douglas-Breckenridge split in 1860
4. "The heresy of Secession—originated in New England"
5. Argument that General Winfield Scott and others had encourage South into secession
6. The election of Abraham Lincoln and "President Buchanan's solemn appeal in favor of the Union"
7. Crittenden Compromise and "refusal of Congress to act either with a view to conciliation or defense"
8. Continued critique of Congress
9. Winfield Scott's argument to fortify federal position in Charleston and Buchanan's argument in opposition
10. South Carolina's secession and "insolent" approach to negotiation with Buchanan, resignation of secessionist John B. Floyd from cabinet to join South
11. Status of Fort Pickens and Buchanan's refutation of arguments about poor combat readiness and that John B. Floyd had transferred arsenals from North to South before his resignation
12. Other events from the Buchanan administration, including the Utah War, the Covode Committee, and "the reduction of the expenses of the Government under Mr. Buchanan's Administration"
13. Foreign policy successes of the Buchanan presidency

Throughout the book, Buchanan refers to himself in the third-person as "Buchanan," the President," or "Mr. B." He also strongly criticizes the abolitionist movement and Republicans, arguing that they bore the ultimate responsibility for the South's decision to leave. Buchanan consistently challenges "the official record" that framed himself as slow to react, supplying his own evidence and rebuttals to figures such as Winfield Scott. His historical narrative also does not reflect the magnitude of the violence during the subsequent Civil War, or the pre-war patches of violence during the Bleeding Kansas period and the Harper's Ferry raid.

== Development ==
With his departure from the presidency during the onset of the Civil War, Buchanan sought to defend his response to the crisis. Jeremiah Black, a good friend who had served as Attorney General and Secretary of State under Buchanan, originally agreed to write a biography intended to correct the record in Buchanan's favor for $7,000 ($197,000 in 2025). The two reached an area of disagreement by September 1861, after Buchanan had publicly praised the Union war effort. Black argued that, if Buchanan did support the war, he could not properly defend his earlier inaction:

If this war is right and politic and wise and constitutional, I cannot but think you ought to have made it. I am willing to vindicate the last administration . . . but I can't do it on the ground which you now occupy.

The two ended the book collaboration, with Buchanan writing that he would "now depend on myself, with God's assistance." Assuming the task to defend himself, Buchanan sought contemporaneous letters and documents from friends, believing they would demonstrate his sound course of action responding to secession. His friends argued that Buchanan had already been the subject of a witch hunt for his record, and that publishing an assertive defense of his unpopular administration would upset the Republican Congress. Black, though less supportive of the Union war effort than Buchanan, cautioned him that the Republican "tribunal" would "drown [Buchanan's] defense with the sound of its drums."

By early 1862, Buchanan said that he would only use the documents he gathered to support a future biographer, though he completed the first draft of the book later that August. He sent that version to multiple friends, including Augustus Schell, Ellis Lewis, and William Bradford Reed, for their feedback.

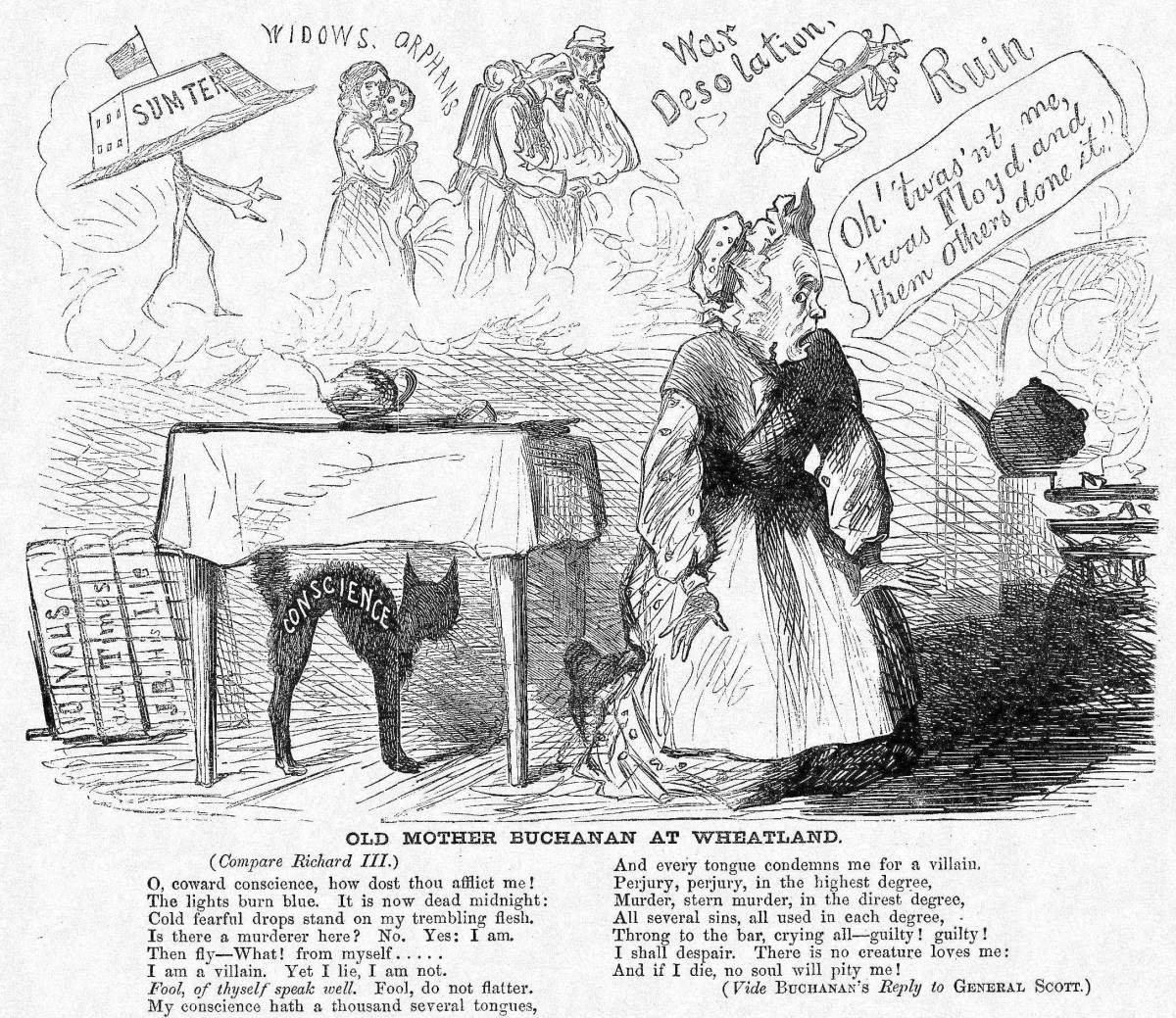
Cartoon of "Old Mother Buchanan at Wheatland" published in November 1862 by Harper's Weekly in response to Scott-Buchanan exchange. In the bottom left is a visualization of Buchanan's memoirs, then nearly finished.

In October 1862, Winfield Scott published a letter from March 1861 that he had sent to Abraham Lincoln assessing the conflict shortly after the new president's inauguration. Buchanan saw the publication, in the National Intelligencer, as a boon to the project, even with the critical outlook of the letter. He had sought a copy of the letter for months and it featured multiple mistakes that he sought to publicly address. Buchanan wrote in response to the newspaper the following week in a long rebuttal, correcting the mistakes in an effort to substantiate his presidential decisions. Buchanan biographer Philip Shriver Klein labelled the debate "the first chapter" of his vindication effort.

In November 1862, Harper's Weekly mocked Buchanan's position in the debate with Scott, publishing a cartoon of him as "Old Mother Buchanan" refusing blame for the war. A version of his memoirs appears in the bottom left corner, with Buchanan claiming in a speech bubble that the war was the fault of John Floyd and other subordinates.

== Release ==
Buchanan submitted his final draft to publisher D. Appleton & Company in 1865. Buchanan expected its release in the fall, growing frustrated when the publisher delayed release until the following January. He wrote in October that he expected its release that month, but that it had "been delayed much longer than I desired or expected." He declined a proposed preface from William Bradford Reed in September, disagreeing with its premise that the Confederate attack on Fort Sumter was not a casus belli. He instead wrote the preface himself. In that essay, which was excerpted in the New-York Tribune in November 1865, Buchanan wrote:

The publication was delayed to avoid the possible imputation, unjust as this would have been, that any portion of it was intended to embarrass Mr. Lincoln's administration in the vigorous prosecution of pending hostility.

The book was priced at $2.50, which was considered high. In the two years after publication, the book sold 5,000 copies.

== Reception ==
The book received generally negative reviews upon release. The New Englander reviewed the book negatively, commenting that "we have no room for pity to the man whose connivance with evil precipitated the rebellion, and whose very argument for our charity so disingenuously suppresses the truth." The Nation wrote that it would be Buchanan's "last intrusion upon public notice, he has written for himself an epitaph under which few men would care to lie." The Field and Fireside in Raleigh, North Carolina concluded that Buchanan was likely to fall into obscurity, with the book's argument contrary to the prevailing understanding of the war. The New-York Tribune lambasted Buchanan and the book, especially faulting his rendering of the Bleeding Kansas crisis and his dismissal of the moral outrage around slavery:

The higher order of men, whom we in our bewilderment call phenomena, our children will revere as apostles; and, when all these ages are dead, our language only remembered by poring monks, and nothing left of us but strange and fanciful fables, become ideas like Hercules, and Jupiter, and Vishnu. Such a phenomenon was John Brown [. . .] He came from nothing; and yet he had in him the thought of this age, and he spoke it, and acted it, and sealed it with his blood. Before him the greatest of us are mere opera-goers, readers of newspapers, loungers on Broadway. Mr. Buchanan calls him "lawless, violent and fanatical." It is poetic and moral justice that a James Buchanan should abuse a John Brown. When God sends us a David, he generally adds a Saul.

Alternatively, The Baltimore Sun praised Buchanan's equanimity overall, but concluded that the book was poorly timed so close to the war. Buchanan's hometown newspaper, the Lancaster Daily Intelligencer, regarded the book in universally positive terms.

We think Mr. Buchanan's book has come out none too soon after all. Singularly calm and dispassionate in its tone, unimpeachable in its fortification of facts, it could not fail to exercise, and we are sure it has exercised, an influence tending to restore the public mind to a more rational and healthy condition.

=== Legacy ===
Mr. Buchanan's Administration on the Eve of Rebellion, has been categorized as the first presidential memoir by a U.S. President. Washington University academic Wayne Fields categorized it as the worst of the group in 2004, but also said it was more authentic than subsequent entries in the genre. In 2020, Craig Fehrman, who wrote a history of presidential memoirs, labelled the book "definitely the worst presidential memoir". The Dictionary of American Biography called the book an "unusually careful document."
