= Julian Borger =

English journalist and writer

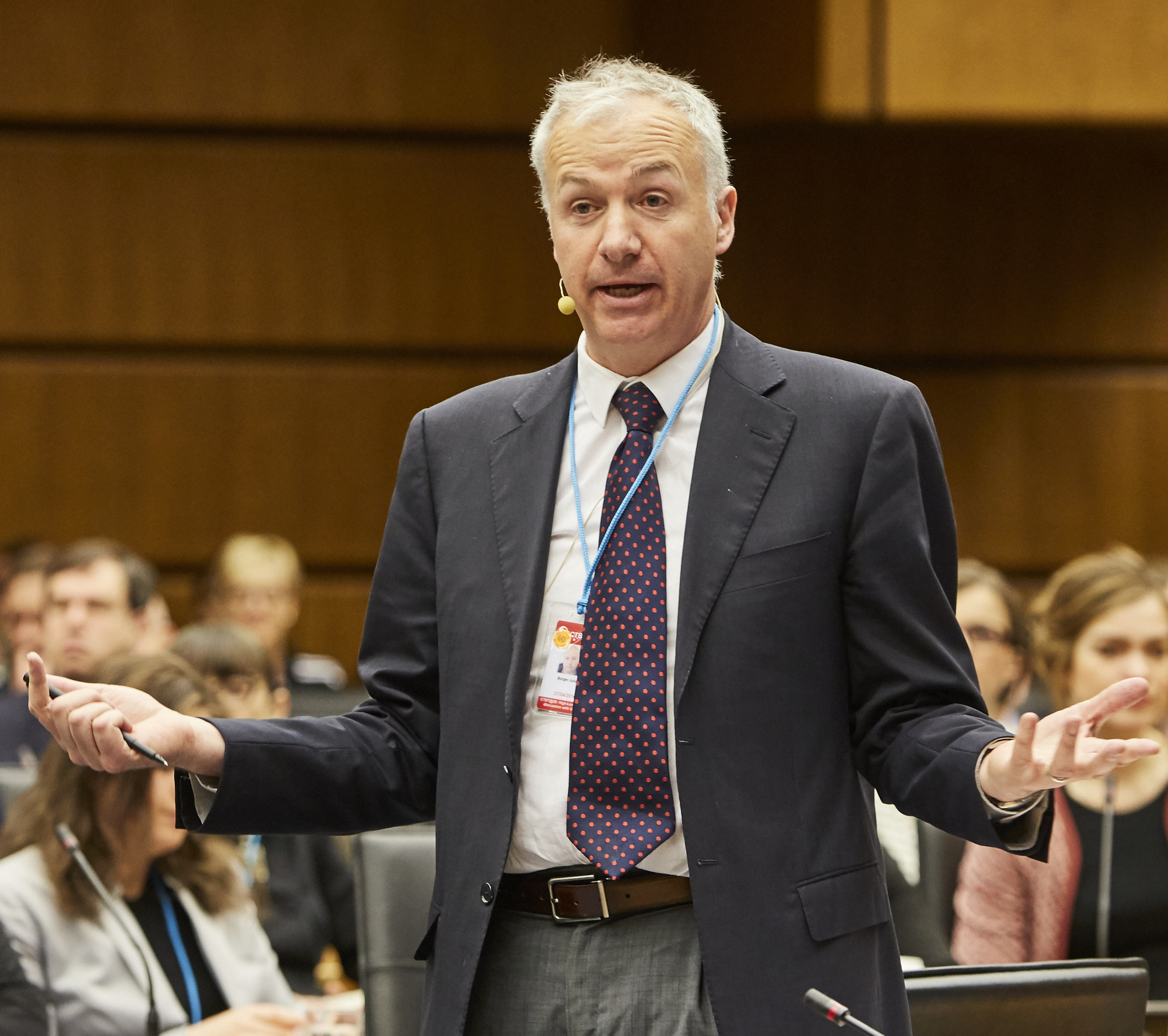
Borger in 2016

Julian Borger is an English journalist and non-fiction writer. He is the world affairs editor at The Guardian. He was part of the Guardian team which won the Pulitzer Prize for public service in 2014.

== Career ==
Borger was a correspondent in the United States, Eastern Europe, the Middle East and the Balkans and covered the Bosnian War for the BBC. In his reporting, Borger covered the Bush administration military spending and Iraq policy. In the 2010s, he wrote about Iran.

Borger is a contributor to the Center on International Cooperation.

In 2016 Borger published a book titled, The Butcher's Trail about the world's most successful manhunt, the pursuit and capture of Balkan war criminals. His 2024 book, I Seek A Kind Person, traces the fate of some 80 Viennese Jewish children, including his own father, who were advertised in the Manchester Guardian by their parents, looking for British foster parents to save them from the Nazis.

== Works ==
- Borger, Julian (2016). The Butcher's Trail: How the Search for Balkan War Criminals Became the World's Most Successful Manhunt. New York: Other Press. ISBN 978-1-59051-605-8. OCLC 921420941.
- Borger, Julian (2024). I Seek a Kind Person: My Father, Seven Children and the Adverts that Helped Them Escape the Holocaust. London: John Murray. ISBN 978-1-39980-330-4. OCLC 1419567163.
