= Delaware State Bar Association =

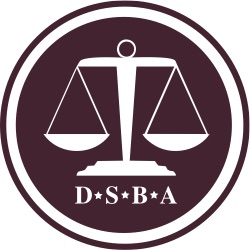
- Logo of the Delaware State Bar Association
- Formation: 1923
- Type: Legal Society
- Headquarters: Wilmington, Delaware
- Location: United States
- Members: Delaware-licensed lawyers
- President: Kate Harmon, Esq.
- President-elect: Mary F. Dugan, Esq.
- Vice President at Large: David A. White, Esq.
- Executive Director: Mark S. Vavala, Esq.
- Website: http://www.dsba.org/

The Delaware State Bar Association (DSBA) is a voluntary bar association for the state of Delaware. Around 90% of attorneys in private practice in Delaware are members. The DSBA was founded in 1923.

== Membership ==
The DSBA has regular membership, new admittee membership, associate membership, and student membership. New admittees to the Bar are provided free membership to the DSBA from the January after Bar admittance to the end of the fiscal year. In addition, members may elect to join any of 27 sections of the Bar, which concentrate on different areas of practice or common interests.

Members receive a discount on continuing legal education and other legal products and services. In July 2017, the DSBA began offering free legal research to all active members. The Delaware State Bar Insurance Services, Inc. (DSBIS), a subsidiary of the DSBA, is an insurance agency which provides insurance to members.

== Publications ==
The bar association publishes the semi-annual Delaware Law Review, with scholarly articles on legal subjects and issues, particularly focused on Delaware law, and the monthly Journal of the Delaware State Bar Association.
