= Theodore Roosevelt bibliography =

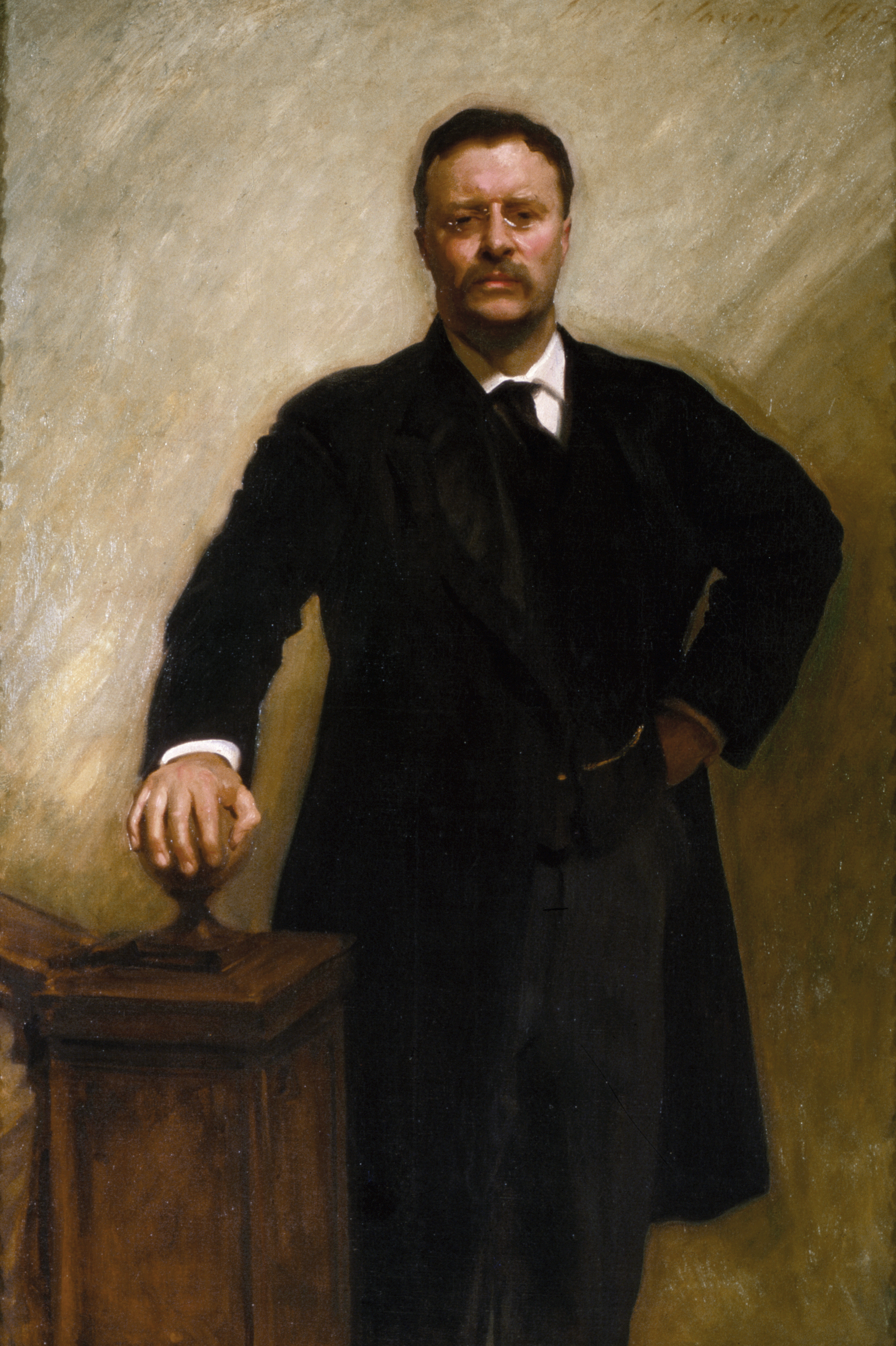
- Theodore Roosevelt by John Singer Sargent
- Books↙: 47
- Articles↙: 32
- Collections↙: 4
- Selected biographies↙: 11

This Theodore Roosevelt bibliography lists the works written by Theodore Roosevelt. Roosevelt was a diligent and skilled writer. When he lost his fortune in the Dakota Territory in 1886 and needed to make a living to support his family, he did so for the rest of his life by writing. Roosevelt wrote on a wide range of topics and genres, including history (The Naval War of 1812), autobiography, biography (Oliver Cromwell), commentary and editorials (whole series for the Kansas City Star and The Outlook), memoirs (of his experiences in Cuba leading the Rough Riders), nature (Summer Birds of the Adirondacks), and guide books (New York: Historic Towns). In addition, by one estimate Roosevelt wrote more than 150,000 letters. In his style, Roosevelt could be strong, introspective, exuberant, or angry—the subject dictated the style.

== Compendia ==
- Auchincloss, Louis, ed. Theodore Roosevelt: Letters and Speeches (2004)
- Brands, H. W. The Selected Letters of Theodore Roosevelt (2001) online
- Hart, Albert Bushnell, and Herbert Ronald Ferleger, Theodore Roosevelt Cyclopedia (1941) online
- Morison, Elting E. ed. The letters of Theodore Roosevelt (8 vol., Harvard UP, 1951–1954); vol. 7 online cover 1909–1912
- O'Toole, Patricia ed. In the Words of Theodore Roosevelt: Quotations from the Man in the Arena (Cornell University Press, 2012)
- The Complete Works of Theodore Roosevelt (2017) 4500 pages in Kindle format online for $1 at Amazon, primary sources

== Books ==
Most are online and can be downloaded at this site

- The Naval War of 1812, Part I. New York: G. P. Putnam's Sons. 1882.
- The Naval War of 1812, Part II. New York: G. P. Putnam's Sons. 1882.
- Hunting Trips of a Ranchman. New York: G. P. Putnam's Sons. 1885.
- Thomas H. Benton. American Statesmen. Boston: Houghton, Mifflin and Company. 1886.
- Essays on Practical Politics. New York: G. P. Putnam's Sons. 1888.
- Gouverneur Morris: The Study of His Life and Work. Boston: Houghton, Mifflin and Company. 1888.
- Ranch Life and the Hunting Trail. New York: The Century Company. 1888.
- The Winning of the West, Volume I: From the Alleghanies to the Mississippi. New York: G. P. Putnam's Sons. 1889.
- The Winning of the West, Volume II: In the Current of the Revolution. New York: G. P. Putnam's Sons. 1889.
- New York. Historic Towns. London: Longman's, Green, and Co. 1891.
- The Wilderness Hunter. New York: G. P. Putnam's Sons. 1893.
- American Big Game Hunting. New York: Forest and Stream Publishing Co. 1893. (with George Bird Grinnell)
- The Winning of the West, Volume III: The War in the Northwest. New York: G. P. Putnam's Sons. 1894.
- Hero Tales from American History. New York: The Century Company. 1895. (with Henry Cabot Lodge)
- Hunting in Many Lands. New York: Forest and Stream Publishing Co. 1895. (with George Bird Grinnell)
- The Winning of the West, Volume IV. New York: G. P. Putnam's Sons. 1896.
- American Ideals. New York: G. P. Putnam's Sons. 1897.
- Trail and Campfire. New York: Forest and Stream Publishing Co. 1897. (with George Bird Grinnell)
- Some American Game. New York: G. P. Putnam's Sons. 1897.
- American Naval Policy: As Outlined in the Messages of the Presidents of the United States. Washington, D.C.: Government Printing Office. 1897.
- The Rough Riders. New York: Charles Scribner's Sons. 1899.
- The Strenuous Life. New York: The Century Company. 1899.
- Oliver Cromwell. New York: Charles Scribner's Sons. 1900.
- The Naval Operations of the War between Great Britain and the United States, 1812–1815. Boston: Little, Brown, and Company. 1901.
- The Deer Family. New York: The MacMillan Company. 1902. (with T. S. Van Dyke, D. G. Elliot, and A. J. Stone)
- Outdoor Pastimes of an American Hunter. New York: Charles Scribner's Sons. 1905.
- Good Hunting: In Pursuit of Big Game in the West. New York: Harper & Brothers Publishers. 1907.
- Outlook Editorials. New York: The Outlook Company. 1909.
- African and European Addresses. New York: Charles Scribner's Sons. 1910.
- African Game Trails. London: John Murray, Albemar Street. 1910.
- American Problems. New York: The Outlook Company. 1910.
- The New Nationalism. New York: The Outlook Company. 1910.
- The Conservation of Womanhood and Childhood. New York: Funk & Wagnalls Company. 1912.
- Realizable Ideals: Earl Lectures of Pacific Theological Seminary. San Francisco: Whitaker & Ray-iggin Co. 1912.
- Theodore Roosevelt: An Autobiography. New York: The MacMillan Company. 1913.
- History as Literature and Other Essays. New York: Charles Scribner's Sons. 1913.
- Progressive Principles. New York: Progressive National Service. 1913.
- Through the Brazilian Wilderness. New York: Charles Scribner's Sons. 1914.
- Life-Histories of African Game Animals, Volume I. New York: Charles Scribner's Sons. 1914. (with Edmund Heller)
- Life-Histories of African Game Animals, Volume II. New York: Charles Scribner's Sons. 1914. (with Edmund Heller)
- America and the World War. New York: Charles Scribner's Sons. 1915.
- Fear God and Take Your Own Part. New York: George H. Dornan Company. 1916.
- A Book Lover's Holidays in the Open. New York: Charles Scribner's Sons. 1916.
- The Foes of Our Own Household. New York: George H. Doran Company. 1917.
- National Strength and International Duty. Princeton: Princeton University Press. 1917.
- The Great Adventure: Present-Day Studies in American Nationalism. New York: Charles Scribner's Sons. 1918.
- Theodore Roosevelt's Letters to His Children. New York: Charles Scribner's Sons. 1919.

== Articles ==
- "Meeting of the Athletic Association". Harvard Advocate (Fall). October 17, 1879.
- "Letter to the Editor about Chimney Butte Ranch". Forest & Stream. December 11, 1884.
- "Phases of State Legislation". Century. April 1, 1885.
- "The President's Policy". North American Review. October 1, 1885.
- "Red and White on the Border". Lend a Hand. February 1, 1886.
- "Ranch Life and Game Shooting in the West, I". Outing. March 1, 1886.
- "Ranch Life and Game Shooting in the West, II". Outing. April 1, 1886.
- "Ranch Life and Game Shooting in the West, III". Outing. May 1, 1886.
- "Ranch Life and Game Shooting in the West, IV". Outing. June 1, 1886.
- "Ranch Life and Game Shooting in the West, V". Outing. July 1, 1886.
- "Cross Country Riding in America". Century. July 1, 1886.
- "Ranch Life and Game Shooting in the West, VI". Outing. August 1, 1886.
- "Machine Politics in New York City". Century. November 1, 1886.
- "Letter to the Editor about Big Game in Dakota". Forest & Stream. December 15, 1887.
- "Remarks on Balloting and Copyright in 'Notes'". North American Review. February 1, 1888.
- "The Ranch Life in the Far West". Century. February 1, 1888.
- "The Home Ranch". Century. March 1, 1888.
- "The Round Up". Century. April 1, 1888.
- "Sheriff's Work on a Ranch". Century. May 1, 1888.
- "Some Recent Criticism of America". Eclectic. November 1, 1888.
- "The Merit System". Independent. November 22, 1888.
- "Review of Book: American Commonwealth". Political Science Quarterly. March 1, 1889.
- "Letter to the Editor about Hunting in Yellowstone by Indians". Forest & Stream. April 11, 1889.
- "Buffalo Hunting". St. Nicholas. December 1, 1889.
- "The Merit System vs The Patronage System". Century. February 1, 1890.
- "'Professionalism' in Sports". North American Review. August 1, 1890.
- "Review of Book Following the Guidon". Harper's Bazaar. August 16, 1890.
- "On Walter Howe". Critic. September 6, 1890.
- "Review of Mahan's The Influence of Sea Power upon History". Atlantic Monthly. October 1, 1890.
- "Andrew Jackson". The Chautauquan. January 1, 1891.
- "Object Lesson in Civil Service Reform". Atlantic Monthly. February 1, 1891.
- "Gettysburg and Waterloo". Century. June 1, 1891.
- "Men", a column in Ladies' Home Journal in 1916 and 1917

== Collections ==
- The Roosevelt Policy, Volume One. New York: The Current Literature Publishing Company. 1908.
- The Roosevelt Policy, Volume Two. New York: The Current Literature Publishing Company. 1919.
- The Roosevelt Policy, Volume Three. New York: The Current Literature Publishing Company. 1919.
- Roosevelt in the Kansas City Star: War-Time Editorials. Boston: Houghton, Mifflin and Company. 1921.
