= War of 1812 museum =

There are several museums named War of 1812 museum:

- 1812 Museum in Washington, D.C.
- Flag House & Star-Spangled Banner Museum in Baltimore, Maryland.
- War of 1812 Museum (Plattsburgh) in Plattsburgh, New York.
