= Promise Me, America =

2026 memoir by Joe Biden

- Author: Joe Biden
- Language: English
- Subject: Presidency of Joe Biden
- Genre: Memoir; autobiography
- Publisher: Little, Brown and Company
- Publication date: November 17, 2026
- Media type: Print
- Pages: 448
- ISBN: 978-0-316-59848-4 (hardcover)
- Preceded by: Promise Me, Dad
- Website: https://promisemeamerica.com/

Promise Me, America is a 2026 memoir by Joe Biden, the 46th president of the United States. It was released on November 17, 2026, three days before Biden's 84th birthday, by Little, Brown and Company. The book covers his presidency and decision to drop out of the 2024 presidential election. The book, which follows in the tradition of post-presidential memoirs, has been in production since 2025.

== Background ==
Joe Biden, the 46th president of the United States took office on January 20, 2021, at the age of 78, and left office on January 20, 2025, at the age of 82. Originally planning to run for a second term, Biden withdrew from re-election on July 21, 2024 following his poor debate performance against Donald Trump and concerns about his age. His vice president, Kamala Harris, became the Democratic Party nominee in the 2024 United States presidential election. Harris lost the election to Trump who was elected to a non-consecutive second term.

In July 2025, Biden said that he was "working my tail off" on his post-presidential memoir. The same month, Biden sold the rights to his memoir for a roughly $10 million advance to Little, Brown and Company, an imprint of Hachette. The $10 million advance was reportedly lower than the $15 million and $60 million sales from Bill Clinton and Barack Obama for their memoirs respectively.

Promise Me, America was announced on July 15, 2026, with a November 17, 2026, release following the midterm elections.

== Contents ==
The book contains the letter left to Biden by President Trump in January 20, 2021, when Biden claimed the presidency. Biden found the letter beguiling because the warmth and effusiveness of the writing contrasted with Trump's personal remarks about Biden.
