= Where's the Rest of Me? =

Political autobiography

Where's the Rest of Me?: The Ronald Reagan Story
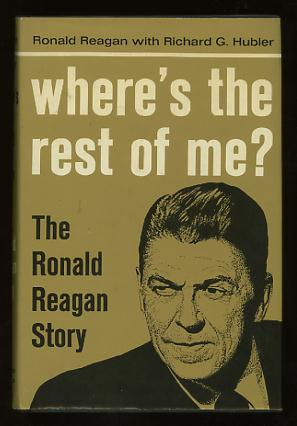
- First edition cover
- Author: Ronald Reagan, Richard Hubler
- Language: English
- Subject: Motion picture actors and actresses--Biography
- Genre: Autobiography
- Publisher: Duell, Sloan and Pearce
- Publication date: 1965
- Publication place: United States
- Media type: book
- Pages: 316
- ISBN: 9781429093897
- OCLC: 1338703
- Dewey Decimal: 927.92
- LC Class: PN2287.R25 A3
- Followed by: An American Life

Where's the Rest of Me? was the first autobiography of Ronald Reagan. Published in 1965, the book covers Reagan's youth, his career in radio, Hollywood and television and his evolving political views.

== Background ==
The impetus for the book came in 1962 when a New York publisher approached Reagan about writing about his conflicts with the communists inside the labor movement. Possibly influenced by the success of John F. Kennedy's Profiles in Courage and Barry Goldwater's The Conscience of a Conservative, Reagan began turning the books into a larger political autobiography once he began writing in early 1963.

The book was ghostwritten by screenwriter Richard G. Hubler. He would meet with Reagan at his Pacific Palisades home and listen to the actor speak about subjects as diverse as his union battles and his father's alcoholism.

The book ended up selling 200,000 copies. His book signing were viewed as a test run for a possible run for governor by backers such as Stuart Spencer.

== Synopsis ==
The book begins with Reagan's youth in Illinois up to his years in college at Eureka College. Then the narrative turns to his career in radio as a sports announcer in Iowa. In the late 1930s he is recruited to star in the Hollywood film Love Is on the Air, playing a radio announcer. He gets roles in B movies through the late 1930s, making his breakthrough in A-level films such as Knute Rockne, All American, Santa Fe Trail and Kings Row, from which the memoir derives its name.

In the late 1940s, Reagan becomes more political, becoming the president of the Screen Actors Guild. He becomes more anti-communist as he clashes with factions aligned with Harry Bridges and the Conference of Studio Unions. Professionally he becomes more involved with television, hosting shows such as General Electric Theater and Death Valley Days, while also becoming a traveling spokesmen for General Electric. The book ends with Reagan on the set of The Killers, stating that he would be unlikely to seek electoral office.
