= White House Diary =

2010 nonfiction book by Jimmy Carter

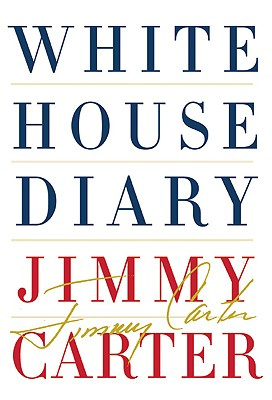
- Author: Jimmy Carter
- Language: English
- Subject: Politics
- Genre: Autobiography
- Publisher: Farrar, Straus and Giroux
- Publication date: September 20, 2010
- Publication place: United States
- Pages: 592
- ISBN: 978-0-374-28099-4
- OCLC: 1043435226

White House Diary is a 2010 book by President Jimmy Carter. It is the personally annotated diary of Carter's presidency, and contains feedback on his relationships with allies and enemies, as well as commentary on his observed impact on issues that still preoccupy America and the world.
