= The Naval War of 1812 =

Book by Theodore Roosevelt

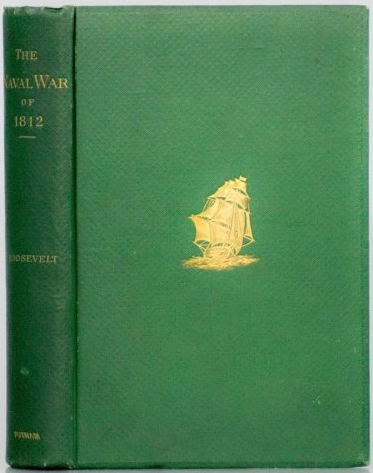
- Cover of the first edition
- Author: Theodore Roosevelt
- Language: English
- Subject: Naval battles and technology of the War of 1812
- Publisher: G.P. Putnam's Sons
- Publication date: 1882
- Publication place: United States
- Media type: Print

The Naval War of 1812 is Theodore Roosevelt's first book, published in 1882. It covers the naval battles and technology used during the War of 1812. It is considered a seminal work in its field, and had a massive impact on the formation of the modern United States Navy.

== Background ==
Theodore Roosevelt graduated from Harvard University in 1880, and was soon after married to Alice Hathaway Lee Roosevelt. While attending Columbia Law School and living in Manhattan, Roosevelt began completing research on a book he had started while still at Harvard. He had already completed two chapters of the book, and had finished it by December 1881. Roosevelt set out to write about a subject that both technically and historically challenged him. He decided on chronicling the naval battles between the British and American navies during the War of 1812. He tried (yet arguably failed, as he admitted he may in the text) to analyze the facts as unbiasedly as possible, looking at both American and British documents from the period, as well as some others from Continental Europe.

== Content ==
Roosevelt introduces the war by discussing the political and social climates of both Great Britain and America before the war. He makes several scathing comments on American unpreparedness for the war, putting the blame especially on President Thomas Jefferson. Roosevelt then discusses, year by year, the naval wars on both the Atlantic Ocean and on the lakes of the Americas. He follows mainly the American crews, but discusses both sides' strengths and weaknesses. Roosevelt's analysis of each crew and commanders role in particular battles leaves the reader with no doubts as to who should receive glory and who should be shamed. He is not absolutely pro-American either. His criticism of Oliver Hazard Perry at the Battle of Lake Erie shows this well. Throughout the book, he praises both sides of the conflict.

== Conclusion ==
Roosevelt concludes that the Americans left the war with a deserved naval victory. However, he does note that this victory was largely moral; the small, singular battles did not have a major effect on Britain's naval arsenal. His conclusion has been criticised for not taking tonnage and materiel wealth into account, nor how the Royal Navy was overstretched and undermanned at the time. The naval war, he notes, gave the American people confidence; since on land their army was consistently beaten, with some exceptions, such as the Battle of New Orleans.

== Impact ==
The book is considered one of the best in its field. It was a considerable achievement for the 23-year-old Roosevelt, who had to learn the technical side of naval terminology and technology. While it was criticized by some for being scholarly and boring, it did well, going through four editions in six years. In 1886, just four years after being published, the U.S. Navy ordered a copy of the book to be placed on every ship. It also affected Roosevelt's later career, bringing his attention to the importance of a strong navy on national power. He would go on to be Assistant Secretary of the Navy, where he helped modernize and build the American navy; as president, he took a keen interest in the navy, including dispatching the Great White Fleet, which circumnavigated the world between 1907 and 1909. This contributed significantly to America's rise as a world power. The book also influenced Alfred Thayer Mahan when he wrote The Influence of Sea Power Upon History, considered the greatest work on naval war in history.
