= Promise Me, Dad =

2017 memoir by Joe Biden

Promise Me, Dad: A Year of Hope, Hardship, and Purpose
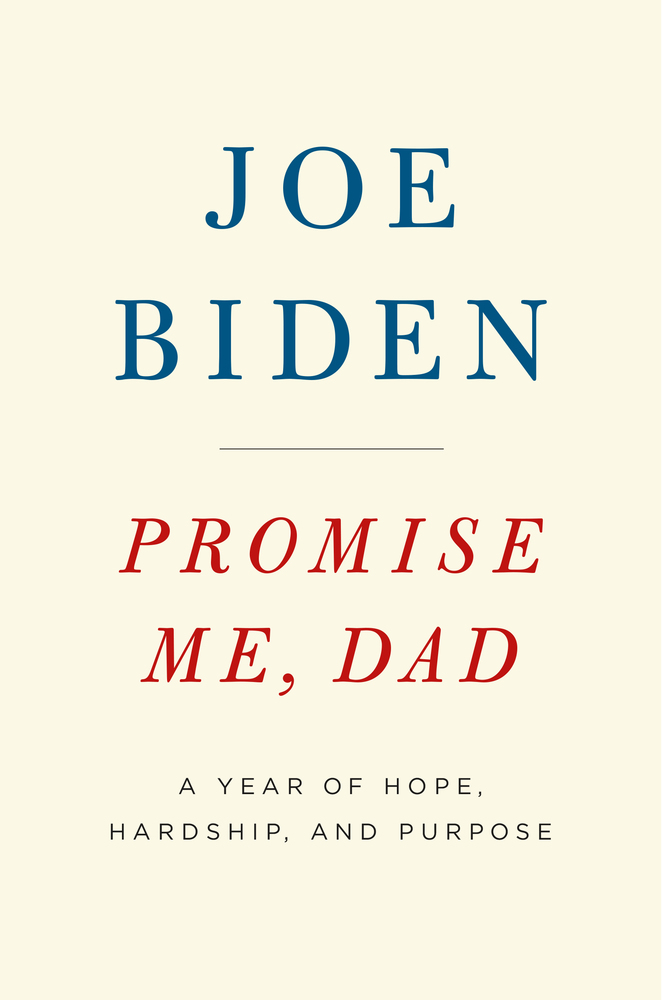
- First edition cover
- Author: Joe Biden
- Language: English
- Genre: Memoir
- Publisher: Flatiron Books
- Publication date: November 14, 2017
- Publication place: United States
- Pages: 272
- ISBN: 978-1250171672
- OCLC: 1159856691
- Preceded by: Promises to Keep
- Followed by: Promise Me, America

Promise Me, Dad: A Year of Hope, Hardship, and Purpose is a 2017 memoir by Joe Biden, the 47th vice president of the United States (and later 46th president). It was first published by Flatiron Books.

== Contents ==
Biden reflects on losing his eldest son Beau to brain cancer and the toll it took on him and his family. He describes his late son as having "all the best of me, but with the bugs and flaws engineered out." Biden also talks about the political implications his son's death had: his decision not to run for president in 2016 was in large part due to the grief he was still processing. He was further discouraged from running by Hillary Clinton's entry into the race and President Obama's implied preference that Biden not dilute her support in the primary elections.

The title of the book was inspired by a conversation Biden had with Beau after his cancer had progressed significantly. Coming to terms with his own mortality, Beau assured his father that no matter what happened, he would be okay. He then asked his father to promise the same in return.

== Reception ==
Vanity Fair called the book "a brisk, often uplifting read, a consequence of its author's congenital jollity and irrepressible candor."
