= Promises to Keep (memoir) =

2007 book by Joe Biden

Promises to Keep: On Life and Politics
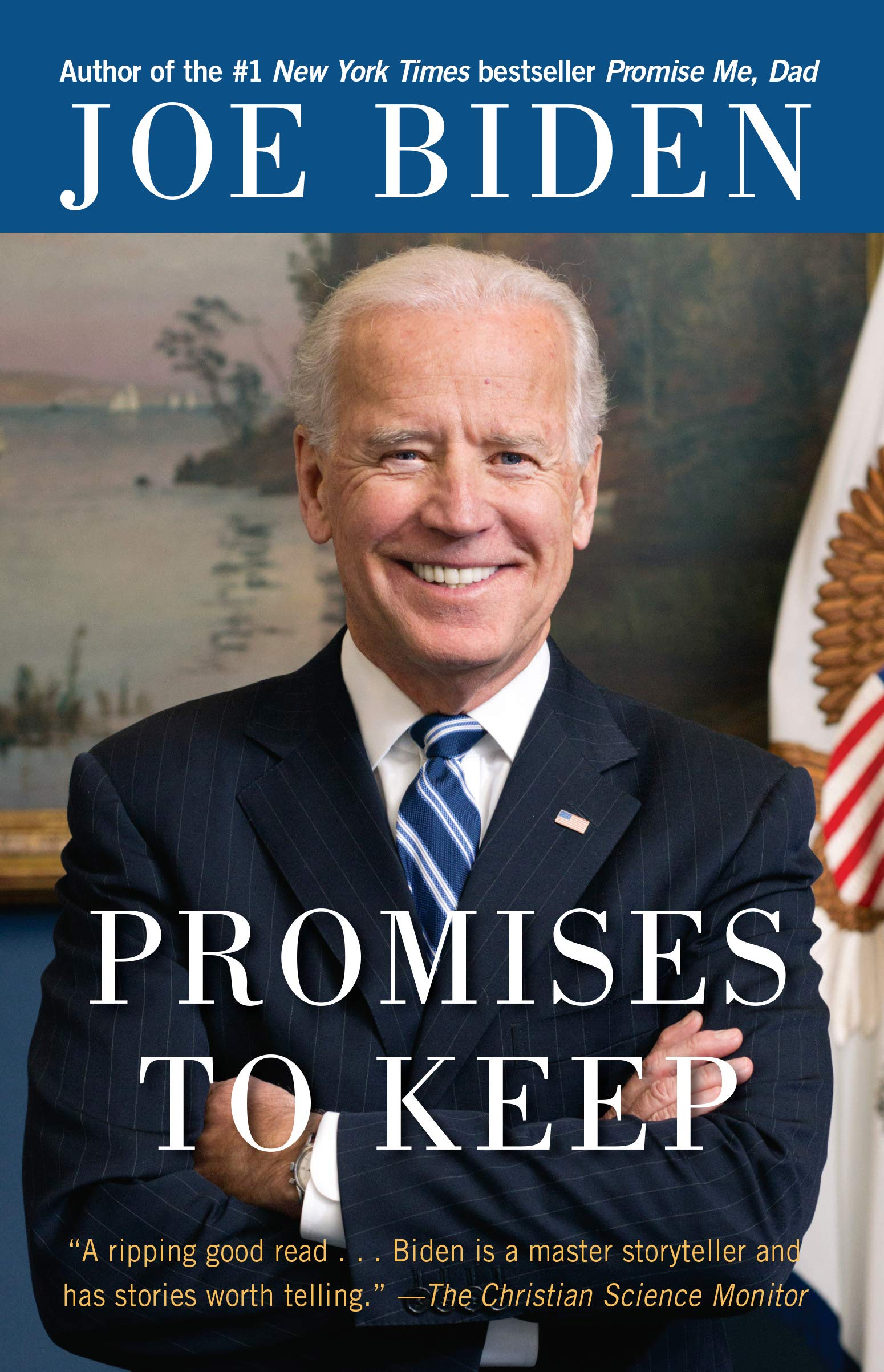
- Cover of a c. 2019 reprint
- Author: Joe Biden
- Language: English
- Genre: Memoir
- Publisher: Random House
- Publication date: July 31, 2007 (hardcover); August 28, 2008 (paperback)
- Publication place: United States
- Pages: 400
- ISBN: 978-1-4000-6536-3
- OCLC: 1132901206
- Followed by: Promise Me, Dad

Promises to Keep: On Life and Politics is a memoir by then-Senator from Delaware Joe Biden. It was ghost written by Mark Zwonitzer. The book was first published by Random House on July 31, 2007. A paperback version was later published in August 2008. It was released in the run-up to Biden's 2008 presidential campaign.

== Contents ==
Biden begins by recounting his life growing up in a Roman Catholic family in Scranton, Pennsylvania and later Wilmington, Delaware. He details the 1972 car accident that killed his wife Neilia and their one-year-old daughter Naomi, and the struggles he faced in its aftermath. He then writes about the second chance he was given upon meeting Jill Jacobs in 1975, as he began his career representing Delaware in the United States Senate. The book also explores his beleaguered 1988 presidential campaign, during which he suffered from two brain aneurysms, and the physical and political recovery he later made.

Parts of the text describing Biden's early childhood are drawn verbatim from the 1992 book What It Takes: The Way to the White House by Richard Ben Cramer.

== Production ==
Promises to Keep was ghost written by Mark Zwonitzer. While being interviewed on The Early Show, Biden explained that the title of the book was inspired by the poem "Stopping by Woods on a Snowy Evening" by Robert Frost. He also considered titling the book "Get Up."

== Release ==
Promises to Keep was first published by Random House on July 31, 2007. A paperback version was published on August 28, 2008. It was released in the run-up to Biden's 2008 presidential campaign.

=== Reception ===
The Christian Science Monitor praised the book writing, "Biden is a master storyteller and has stories worth telling." Likewise, The New York Times called it "a compelling personal story", while Salon.com commended Biden's response to tragedy as "both admirable and likable".
