= George W. Bush =

President of the United States from 2001 to 2009

- Official portrait, 2003

43rd President of the United States
- In office January 20, 2001 – January 20, 2009
- Vice President: Dick Cheney
- Preceded by: Bill Clinton
- Succeeded by: Barack Obama

46th Governor of Texas
- In office January 17, 1995 – December 21, 2000
- Lieutenant: Bob Bullock Rick Perry
- Preceded by: Ann Richards
- Succeeded by: Rick Perry

Personal details
- Born: George Walker Bush; July 6, 1946 (age 80) New Haven, Connecticut, U.S.
- Party: Republican
- Spouse: Laura Welch (m. 1977)
- Children: Barbara; Jenna
- Parents: George H. W. Bush; Barbara Pierce
- Relatives: Bush family
- Education: Yale University (BA); Harvard University (MBA)
- Civilian awards: Full list
- Website: Official website; Presidential Library; Presidential Center; White House Archives

Military service
- Branch/service: United States Air Force; Texas Air National Guard; Alabama Air National Guard
- Years of service: 1968–1974
- Rank: First Lieutenant
- Unit: 147th Reconnaissance Wing; 187th Fighter Wing
- Military awards: Air Force Pilot's Badge; Outstanding Unit Award; National Defense Service Medal
- Bush's voice Bush addressing the nation following the September 11 attacks Recorded September 11, 2001

George Walker Bush (born July 6, 1946) is an American retired politician and businessman who served as the 43rd president of the United States from 2001 to 2009. A member of the Republican Party, he previously served as the 46th governor of Texas from 1995 to 2000. He is the eldest son of George H. W. Bush, the 41st president.

Born in New Haven, Connecticut, Bush graduated from Yale University in 1968 with a bachelor's degree in history. After service in the Texas Air National Guard, he graduated from Harvard Business School in 1975, before going back to Texas and founding his own oil company. Bush married Laura Welch, an elementary school librarian, in 1977. They had two children: Barbara and Jenna. In 1989, Bush bought out the Major League Baseball team Texas Rangers, becoming its co-owner. He ran for governor of Texas in 1994, winning by a clear margin. As governor, Bush sponsored tort reform legislation, increased funding for education, set higher standards for schools, and reformed the criminal justice system. He also helped make Texas the leading producer of wind-generated electricity in the United States. In the 2000 presidential election, he defeated Democratic incumbent vice president Al Gore while losing the popular vote, following a narrow and contested Electoral College win that involved the Supreme Court decision Bush v. Gore.

In his first term, Bush signed a major tax-cut program and an education-reform bill, the No Child Left Behind Act. He pushed for socially conservative efforts such as the Partial-Birth Abortion Ban Act, restrictions on same-sex marriage, and faith-based initiatives. He also initiated the President's Emergency Plan for AIDS Relief, in 2003, to address the global AIDS epidemic. The September 11 attacks during 2001 decisively reshaped his administration, resulting in the start of the war on terror and the creation of the Department of Homeland Security. Bush ordered the invasion of Afghanistan in an effort to overthrow the Taliban, destroy al-Qaeda, and capture Osama bin Laden. He signed the Patriot Act, expanding surveillance powers for suspected terrorists. He also ordered the 2003 invasion of Iraq to overthrow Saddam Hussein's regime, citing claims that it possessed weapons of mass destruction and had ties with al-Qaeda. Bush later signed the Medicare Modernization Act, which created Medicare Part D. Bush was re-elected in 2004, winning the popular vote against Democratic nominee John Kerry.

During his second term, Bush negotiated various free trade agreements, appointed John Roberts and Samuel Alito to the Supreme Court, and sought major changes to Social Security and immigration laws, both of which ultimately failed in Congress. He was widely criticized for his administration's handling of Hurricane Katrina and revelations of torture against detainees at Abu Ghraib prison in Iraq. Amid his unpopularity, the Democrats regained control of Congress in the 2006 elections. In January 2007, Bush launched a surge of troops in Iraq. As his presidency came to a close, the country experienced a financial crisis, resulting in the Great Recession, prompting his administration and Congress to push through emergency economic measures aimed at stabilizing the financial system, including the Troubled Asset Relief Program.

After his second term, Bush returned to Texas, where he has maintained a low public profile. At various points in his presidency, he was both among the most popular and among the least popular presidents in U.S. history. He received the highest recorded approval ratings in the wake of the September 11 attacks, and one of the lowest ratings during the 2008 financial crisis. Bush left office as one of the most unpopular U.S. presidents; however, public opinion of him has improved in his post-presidency. Scholars and historians generally rank Bush as a below-average president.

== Early life and education ==
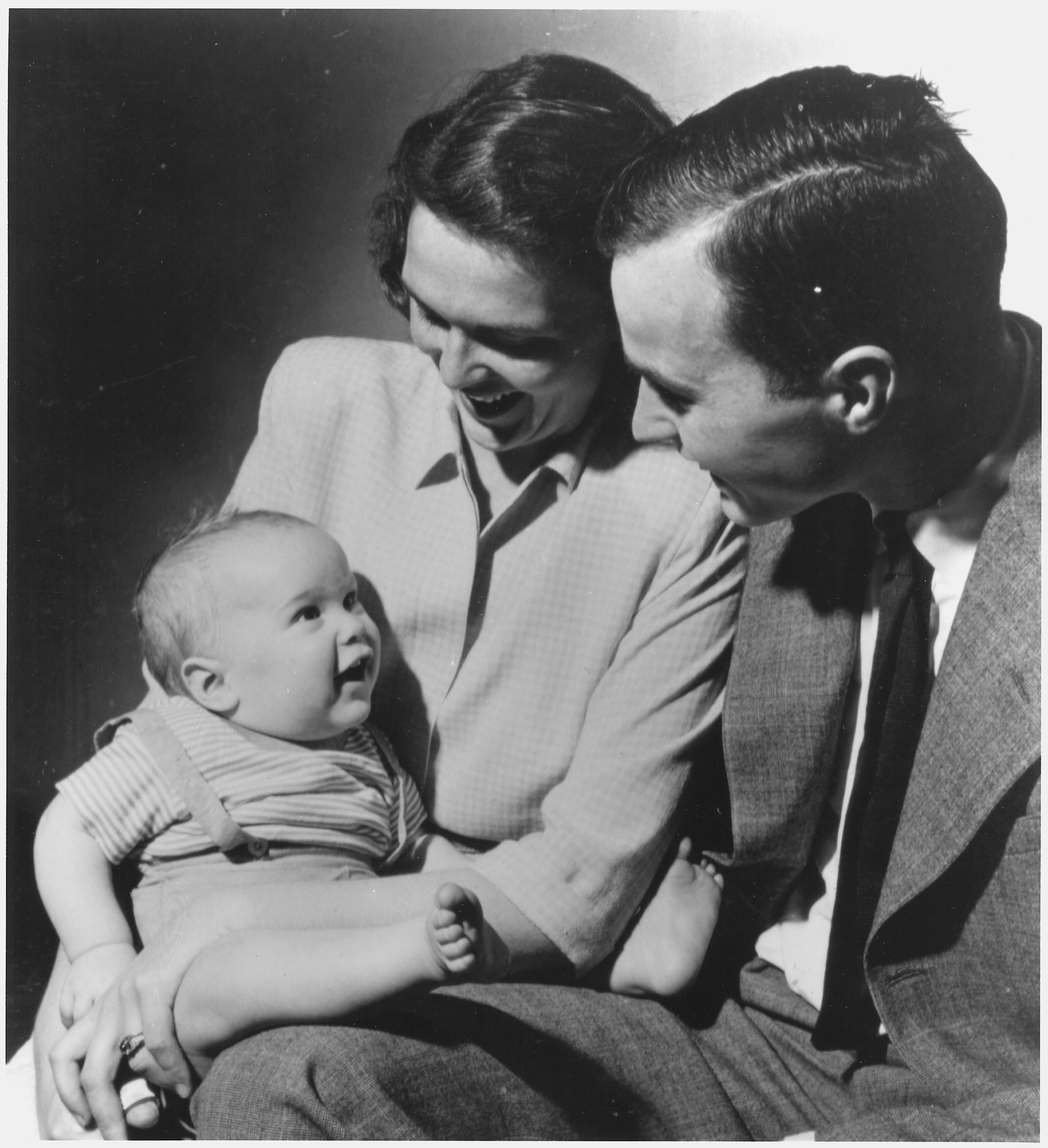
Bush with his parents, Barbara and George H. W. Bush in 1947

George Walker Bush was born on July 6, 1946, at Grace-New Haven Hospital in New Haven, Connecticut. He is the first child of George Herbert Walker Bush and Barbara Pierce, and was raised in Midland and Houston, Texas. His five siblings are Robin, Jeb, Neil, Marvin and Dorothy. Robin died from leukemia at the age of three in 1953. His paternal grandfather, Prescott Bush, was a U.S. senator from Connecticut. His father was Ronald Reagan's vice president from 1981 to 1989 and the 41st president of the United States from 1989 to 1993. Bush has distant English and German ancestry, along with more distant (over seven generations removed) Dutch, Welsh, Irish, French, and Scottish roots.

Bush attended public schools in Midland, Texas, until the family moved to Houston after he had completed seventh grade. He then spent two years at The Kinkaid School, a college-preparatory school in Piney Point Village, Texas.

Bush later attended Phillips Academy, a boarding school in Andover, Massachusetts, where he played baseball and was the head cheerleader during his senior year. He attended Yale University from 1964 to 1968, graduating with a Bachelor of Arts degree in history. During this time, he was a cheerleader and a member of the Delta Kappa Epsilon, serving as the president of the fraternity during his senior year. Bush became a member of the Skull and Bones society as a senior. Bush was a rugby union player and was on Yale's 1st XV. He characterized himself as an average student. His grade point average during his first three years at Yale was 77, and he had a similar average under a nonnumerical rating system in his final year.

In the fall of 1973, Bush entered Harvard Business School. He graduated in 1975 with a Master of Business Administration. He is the only U.S. president to have earned that degree.

== Career ==
=== Military career ===
In May 1968, Bush joined the United States Air Force and was commissioned into the Texas Air National Guard. After two years of training in active-duty service, he was assigned to Houston, flying Convair F-102s with the 147th Reconnaissance Wing out of Ellington Field Joint Reserve Base. Critics, including former Democratic National Committee Chairman Terry McAuliffe, have alleged that Bush was favorably treated due to his father's political standing as a member of the House of Representatives, citing his selection as a pilot despite his low pilot aptitude test scores and his irregular attendance. In June 2005, the Department of Defense released all the records of Bush's Texas Air National Guard service, which remain in its official archives.

In late 1972 and early 1973, he drilled with the 187th Fighter Wing of the Alabama Air National Guard. He had moved to Montgomery, Alabama, to work on the unsuccessful U.S. Senate campaign of Republican Winton M. Blount. In 1972, Bush was suspended from flying for failure to take a scheduled physical exam. He was honorably discharged from the Air Force Reserve on November 21, 1974.

Bush remains the most recent president to have served in the military.

=== Business career ===
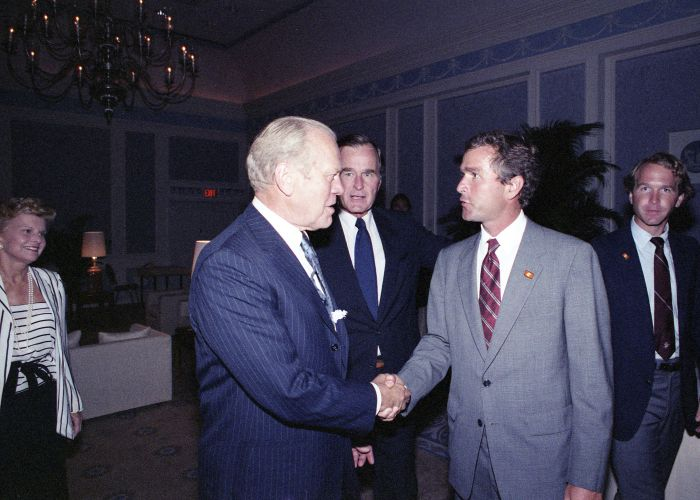
Bush with former president Gerald Ford in August 1984

In 1977, Bush established Arbusto Energy, a small oil exploration company, which began operations in 1978. He later changed the name to Bush Exploration. In 1984, his company merged with the larger Spectrum 7, and Bush became chairman. The company was hurt by decreased oil prices, and it folded into Harken Energy Corporation, with Bush becoming a member of Harken's board of directors. Questions of possible insider trading involving Harken arose, but a Securities and Exchange Commission investigation concluded that the information Bush had at the time of his stock sale was not sufficient to constitute insider trading.

In April 1989, Bush arranged for a group of investors to purchase a controlling interest in Major League Baseball's Texas Rangers for $89 million and invested $500,000 himself to start. He was then the managing general partner for five years. He actively led the team's projects and regularly attended its games, often choosing to sit in the open stands with fans. Bush's sale of his shares in the Rangers in 1998 brought him over $15 million from his initial $800,000 investment.

In the early or mid 1990s, before his gubernatorial campaign, Bush briefly considered running for Commissioner of Baseball.

=== Early political involvement ===
In 1978, Bush ran for the U.S. House of Representatives from Texas's 19th congressional district. The retiring member, George H. Mahon, had held the district for the Democratic Party since 1935. Bush's opponent, Kent Hance, portrayed him as out of touch with rural Texans, and Bush lost the election, receiving 46.8 percent of the vote to Hance's 53.2 percent.

Bush and his family moved to Washington, D.C., in 1988 to work on his father's campaign for the U.S. presidency. He was a campaign advisor and liaison to the media, and assisted his father by campaigning across the country. In December 1991, Bush was one of seven people named by his father to run his father's 1992 presidential re-election campaign as a campaign advisor. The previous month, his father had asked him to tell White House chief of staff John H. Sununu to resign.

== Governor of Texas (1995–2000) ==
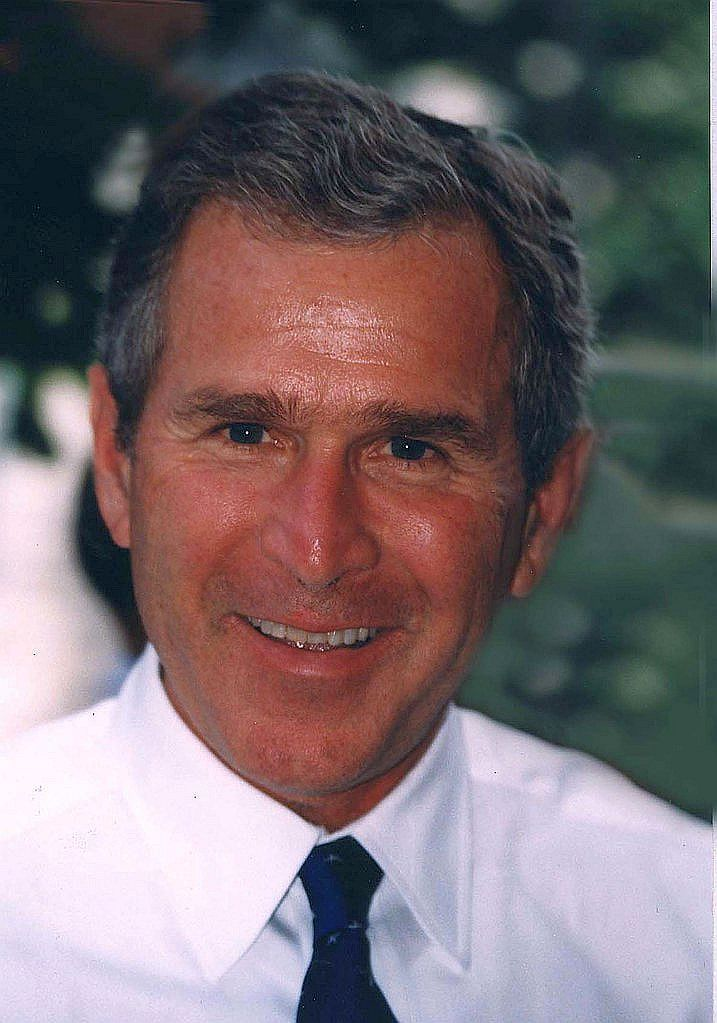
Bush during his governorship, 1999

Bush declared his candidacy for the 1994 Texas gubernatorial election at the same time his brother Jeb sought the governorship in Florida. His campaign focused on four themes: welfare reform, tort reform, crime reduction, and education improvement. Bush's campaign advisers were Karen Hughes, Joe Allbaugh, and Karl Rove.

After easily winning the Republican primary, Bush faced popular Democratic incumbent governor Ann Richards. In the course of the campaign, Bush pledged to sign a bill allowing Texans to obtain permits to carry concealed weapons. Richards had vetoed the bill, but Bush signed it into law after he became governor. According to The Atlantic, the race "featured a rumor that she was a lesbian, along with a rare instance of such a tactic's making it into the public record – when a regional chairman of the Bush campaign allowed himself, perhaps inadvertently, to be quoted criticizing Richards for 'appointing avowed homosexual activists' to state jobs". The Atlantic, and others, connected the lesbian rumor to Karl Rove, but Rove denied being involved. Bush won the general election with 53.5 percent of the vote against Richards' 45.9 percent.

Bush used a budget surplus to push through Texas's largest tax cut, $2 billion. He extended government funding for organizations providing education on the dangers of alcohol and drug use and abuse, and helping to reduce domestic violence. His administration lowered the age at which juveniles can be sent to adult court for serious crimes to 14. Bush presided over 152 executions, more than any previous governor in modern American history; critics such as Helen Prejean argue that he failed to give serious consideration to clemency requests. Critics also contended that during his tenure, Texas ranked near the bottom in environmental evaluations. Supporters pointed to his efforts to raise the salaries of teachers and improve educational test scores.

In 1999, Bush signed a law that required electric retailers to buy a certain amount of energy from renewable sources (RPS), which helped Texas eventually become the leading producer of wind-powered electricity in the U.S.

In 1998, Bush won re-election with a record 68 percent of the vote. He became the first governor in Texas history to be elected to two consecutive four-year terms. During his second term, Bush promoted faith-based organizations and enjoyed high approval ratings, which ranged between 62 and 81 percent. He proclaimed June 10, 2000, to be Jesus Day in Texas, a day on which he urged all Texans to "answer the call to serve those in need".

Throughout Bush's first term, he was the focus of national attention as a potential future presidential candidate. Following his re-election, speculation soared, and within a year he decided to seek the 2000 Republican presidential nomination.

== Presidential campaigns ==
=== 2000 presidential campaign ===
==== Primary ====
Bush announced his candidacy on June 12, 1999. Bush portrayed himself as a compassionate conservative, implying he was more centrist than other Republicans. He campaigned on a platform which included bringing integrity and honor back to the White House, increasing the size of the military, cutting taxes, improving education, and aiding minorities. By early 2000, the race had centered on Bush and Arizona senator John McCain.

Bush won the Iowa caucuses and, although heavily favored to win the New Hampshire primary, trailed McCain by 19% and lost. Despite this, he regained momentum and effectively became the front runner after the South Carolina primary, which according to The Boston Globe made history for his campaign's negativity. The New York Times described it as a smear campaign.

==== General election ====
On July 25, 2000, Bush surprised some observers when he selected Dick Cheney – a former White House chief of staff, U.S. representative, and secretary of defense – to be his running mate. At the time, Cheney was serving as head of Bush's vice presidential search committee. Soon after at the 2000 Republican National Convention, Bush and Cheney were officially nominated by the Republican Party.

Bush continued to campaign across the country and touted his record as Governor of Texas. During his campaign, Bush criticized his Democratic opponent, incumbent vice president Al Gore, over gun control and taxation.

When the election returns were tallied on November 7, Bush had won 29 states, including Florida. The closeness of the Florida outcome led to a recount. The initial recount also went to Bush, but the outcome was tied up in lower courts for a month until eventually reaching the U.S. Supreme Court. On December 9, in the controversial Bush v. Gore ruling, the Court reversed a Florida Supreme Court decision that had ordered a third count, and stopped an ordered statewide hand recount based on the argument that the use of different standards among Florida's counties violated the Equal Protection Clause of the Fourteenth Amendment. The machine recount showed that Bush had won the Florida vote by a margin of 537 votes out of six million casts. Although he had received 543,895 fewer individual nationwide votes than Gore, Bush won the election, receiving 271 electoral votes to Gore's 266 (Gore had actually been awarded 267 votes by the states pledged to him plus the District of Columbia, but one D.C. elector abstained). Bush was the first person to win a U.S. presidential election with fewer popular votes than another candidate since Benjamin Harrison in 1888.

=== 2004 presidential campaign ===
In his 2004 bid for re-election, Bush commanded broad support in the Republican Party and did not encounter a primary challenge. He appointed Ken Mehlman as campaign manager, and Karl Rove devised a political strategy. Bush and the Republican platform emphasized a strong commitment to the wars in Iraq and Afghanistan, support for the USA PATRIOT Act, a renewed shift in policy for constitutional amendments banning abortion and same-sex marriage, reforming Social Security to create private investment accounts, creation of an ownership society, and opposing mandatory carbon emissions controls. Bush also called for the implementation of a guest worker program for immigrants, which was criticized by conservatives.

The Bush campaign advertised across the U.S. against Democratic candidates, including Bush's emerging opponent, Massachusetts senator John Kerry. Kerry and other Democrats attacked Bush on the Iraq War, and accused him of failing to stimulate the economy and job growth. The Bush campaign portrayed Kerry as a staunch liberal who would raise taxes and increase the size of government. The Bush campaign continuously criticized Kerry's seemingly contradictory statements on the war in Iraq, and argued that Kerry lacked the decisiveness and vision necessary for success in the war on terror.

Following the resignation of CIA director George Tenet in 2004, Bush nominated Porter Goss to head the agency. The White House ordered Goss to purge agency officers who were disloyal to the administration. After Goss' appointment, many of the CIA's senior agents were fired or quit. The CIA has been accused of deliberately leaking classified information to undermine the 2004 election.

In the election, Bush carried 31 of 50 states, receiving 286 electoral votes. He won an absolute majority of the popular vote (50.7% to Kerry's 48.3%).

== Presidency (2001–2009) ==
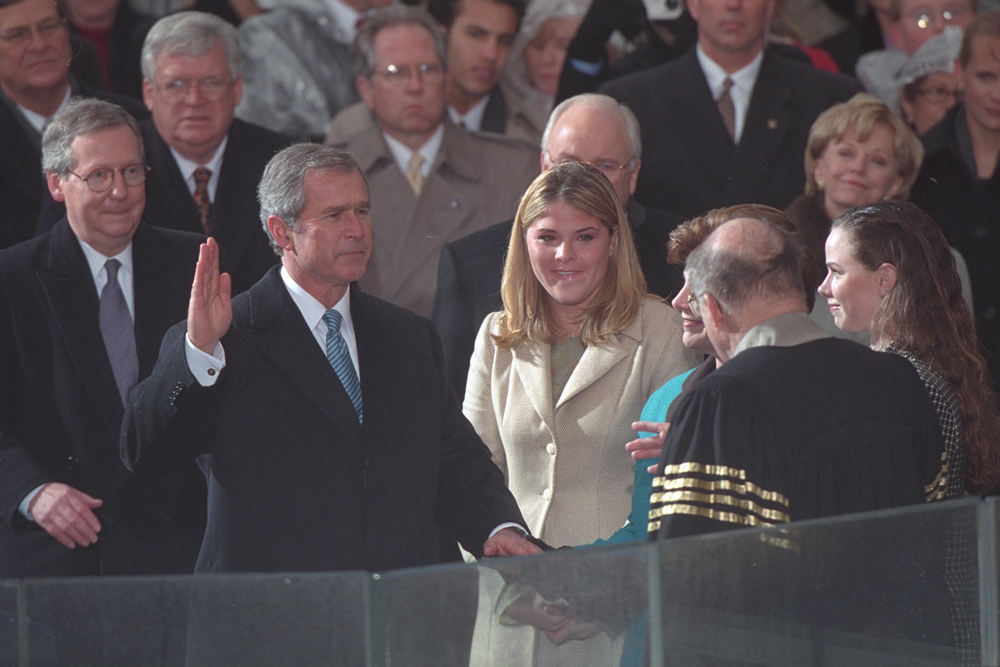
Bush takes the oath of office administered by Chief Justice William Rehnquist at the Capitol on January 20, 2001.

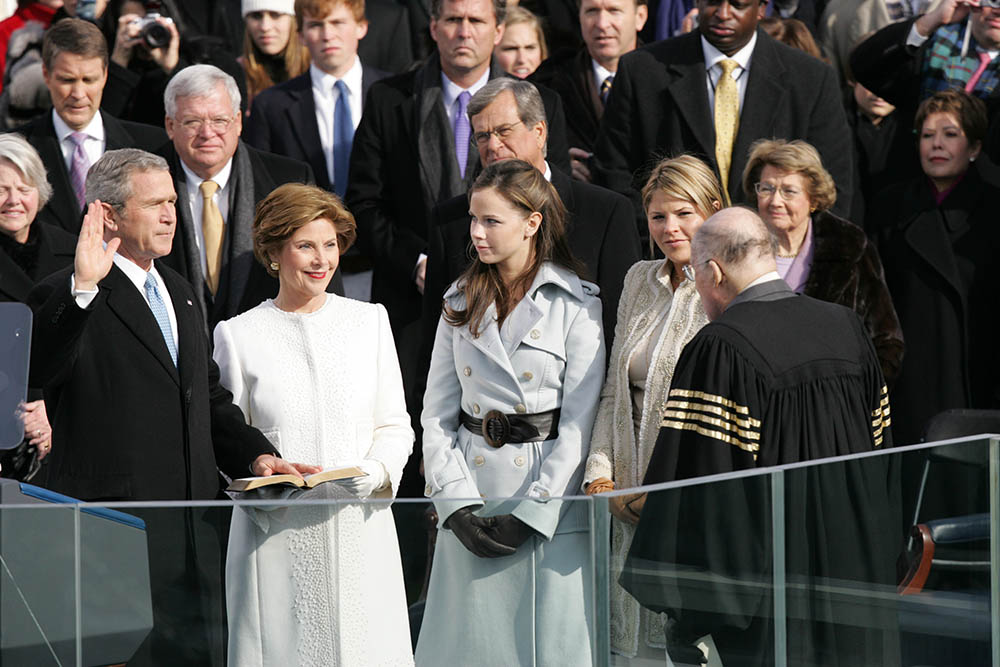
Bush takes the oath of office to a second term.

Bush had originally outlined an ambitious domestic agenda, but his priorities were significantly altered following the September 11 attacks. Wars were begun in Afghanistan and Iraq, and there were significant domestic debates regarding immigration, healthcare, Social Security, economic policy, and treatment of terrorist detainees. Over an eight-year period, Bush's once-high approval ratings steadily declined, while his disapproval numbers increased significantly. In 2007, the United States entered the longest post-World War II recession.

=== Domestic policy ===
==== Economic policy ====
Bush took office during an economic recession in the wake of the bursting of the dot-com bubble. The September 11 terrorist attacks also impacted the economy.

His administration increased federal government spending from $1.8 trillion to $3 trillion (66%), while revenues increased from $2 trillion to $2.5 trillion (from 2000 to 2008). Individual income tax revenues increased by 14%, corporate tax revenues by 50%, and customs and duties by 40%. Discretionary defense spending was increased by 107%, discretionary domestic spending by 62%, Medicare spending by 131%, social security by 51%, and income security spending by 130%. Cyclically adjusted, revenues rose by 35% and spending by 65%. The increase in spending was more than under any predecessor since Lyndon B. Johnson. The number of economic regulation governmental workers increased by 91,196.

The surplus in 2000 was $237 billion – the third consecutive surplus and the largest surplus ever. In 2001, Bush's budget estimated that there would be a $5.6 trillion surplus over the next ten years. Facing congressional opposition, Bush held town hall-style meetings across the U.S. to increase public support for his plan for a $1.35 trillion tax cut program, one of the largest tax cuts in history. Bush argued that unspent government funds should be returned to taxpayers, saying "the surplus is not the government's money. The surplus is the people's money." Federal Reserve chairman Alan Greenspan warned of a recession and Bush stated that a tax cut would stimulate the economy and create jobs. Treasury Secretary Paul H. O'Neill opposed some of the tax cuts on the basis they would contribute to budget deficits and undermine Social Security. O'Neill disputes the claim, made in Bush's book Decision Points, that he never openly disagreed with him on planned tax cuts. By 2003, the economy showed signs of improvement, though job growth remained stagnant. Another tax cut was passed that year.

Between 2001 and 2008, GDP grew at an average annual rate of 2.125%, less than for past business cycles. Bush entered office with the Dow Jones Industrial Average at 10,587, and the average peaked in October 2007 at over 14,000. When Bush left office, the average was at 7,949, one of the lowest levels of his presidency. Only four other U.S. presidents have left office with the stock market lower than when they began.

Unemployment originally rose from 4.2% in January 2001 to 6.3% in June 2003, but subsequently dropped to 4.5% in July 2007. Adjusted for inflation, median household income dropped by $1,175 between 2000 and 2007, while Professor Ken Homa of Georgetown University noted that "Median real after-tax household income went up two percent". The poverty rate increased from 11.3% in 2000 to 12.3% in 2006 after peaking at 12.7% in 2004. By October 2008, due to increases in spending, the U.S. national debt had risen to $11.3 trillion, more than doubling it since 2000. Most debt was accumulated as a result of what became known as the "Bush tax cuts" and increased national security spending. In March 2006, then-senator Barack Obama said when he voted against raising the debt ceiling: "The fact that we are here today to debate raising America's debt limit is a sign of leadership failure." By the end of Bush's presidency, unemployment climbed to 7.2%.

==== 2008 financial crisis ====
In December 2007, the United States entered the longest post–World War II recession, caused by a housing market correction, a subprime mortgage crisis, soaring oil prices, and other factors. In February 2008, 63,000 jobs were lost, a five-year record, and in November, over 500,000 jobs were lost, which marked the largest loss of jobs in the United States in 34 years. The Bureau of Labor Statistics reported that in the last four months of 2008, 1.9 million jobs were lost. By the end of 2008, the U.S. had lost 2.6 million jobs.

To aid with the situation, Bush signed a $170 billion economic stimulus package which was intended to improve the economic situation by sending tax rebate checks to many Americans and providing tax breaks for struggling businesses. The Bush administration pushed for significantly increased regulation of Fannie Mae and Freddie Mac in 2003, and after two years, the regulations passed the House but died in the Senate. Many Republican senators, as well as influential members of the Bush Administration, feared that the agency created by these regulations would merely be mimicking the private sector's risky practices. In September 2008, the 2008 financial crisis intensified, beginning with the Federal takeover of Fannie Mae and Freddie Mac followed by the bankruptcy of Lehman Brothers and a federal bailout of American International Group for $85 billion.

Many economists and world governments determined that the situation had become the worst financial crisis since the Great Depression. Additional regulation over the housing market would have been beneficial, according to former Federal Reserve chairman Alan Greenspan. Bush, meanwhile, proposed a financial rescue plan to buy back a large portion of the U.S. mortgage market. Vince Reinhardt, a former Federal Reserve economist now at the American Enterprise Institute, said "it would have helped for the Bush administration to empower the folks at Treasury and the Federal Reserve and the comptroller of the currency and the FDIC to look at these issues more closely", and additionally, that it would have helped "for Congress to have held hearings".

==== Education and public health ====
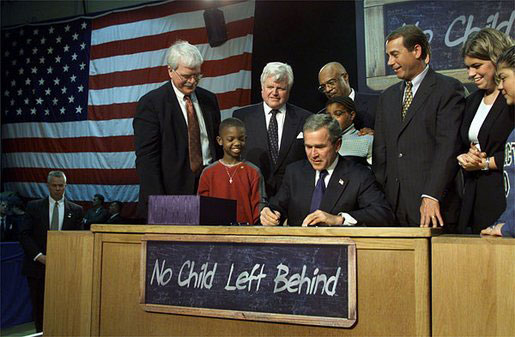
President Bush signing the No Child Left Behind Act into law on January 8, 2002

Bush pursued many educational initiatives, such as increasing the funding for the National Science Foundation and National Institutes of Health in his first years of office and creating education programs to strengthen the grounding in science and mathematics for American high school students. Funding for the NIH was cut in 2006, the first such cut in 36 years, due to rising inflation.

One of the administration's early major initiatives was the No Child Left Behind Act, which aimed to measure and close the gap between rich and poor student performance, provide options to parents with students in low-performing schools, and target more federal funding to low-income schools. This landmark education initiative passed with broad bipartisan support, including the support of Senator Ted Kennedy of Massachusetts. It was signed into law by Bush in early 2002. Many contend that the initiative has been successful, as cited by the fact that students in the U.S. have performed significantly better on state reading and math tests since Bush signed "No Child Left Behind" into law. Critics argue that it is underfunded and that NCLBA's focus on "high-stakes testing" and quantitative outcomes is counterproductive.

On November 1, 2005, Bush launched a National Strategy for Pandemic Influenza, which culminated in an implementation plan published by the Homeland Security Council in May 2006.

After being re-elected, Bush signed into law a Medicare drug benefit program which, according to Jan Crawford, resulted in "the greatest expansion in America's welfare state in forty years" – the bill's costs approached $7 trillion. In 2007, Bush opposed and vetoed State Children's Health Insurance Program (SCHIP) legislation, which was added by the Democrats onto a war funding bill and passed by Congress. The SCHIP legislation would have significantly expanded federally funded healthcare benefits and plans to children of some low-income families. It was to be funded by an increase in the cigarette tax. Bush viewed the legislation as a move toward socialized health care, and asserted that the program could benefit families making as much as $83,000 per year who did not need the help.

On May 21, 2008, Bush signed into law the Genetic Information Nondiscrimination Act, aimed to protect Americans against health insurance and employment discrimination based on a person's genetic information. The issue had been debated for 13 years before it finally became law. The measure is designed to protect citizens without hindering genetic research.

==== Social services and Social Security ====
Following Republican efforts to pass the Medicare Act of 2003, Bush signed the bill, which included major changes to the Medicare program by providing beneficiaries with some assistance in paying for prescription drugs, while relying on private insurance for the delivery of benefits. The retired persons lobby group AARP worked with the Bush Administration on the program and gave its endorsement. Bush said the law, estimated to cost $400 billion over the first ten years, would give the elderly "better choices and more control over their health care".

Bush began his second term by outlining a major initiative to reform Social Security, which was facing record deficit projections beginning in 2005. Bush made it the centerpiece of his domestic agenda despite opposition from some in the U.S. Congress. In his 2005 State of the Union Address, Bush discussed the potential impending bankruptcy of the program and outlined his new program, which included partial privatization of the system, personal Social Security accounts, and options to permit Americans to divert a portion of their Social Security tax (FICA) into secured investments. Democrats opposed the proposal to partially privatize the system.

Bush embarked on a 60-day national tour, campaigning for his initiative in media events known as "Conversations on Social Security" in an attempt to gain public support. Nevertheless, public support for the proposal declined, and the House Republican leadership decided not to put Social Security reform on the priority list for the remainder of their 2005 legislative agenda. The proposal's legislative prospects were further diminished by autumn 2005 due to political fallout from the response to Hurricane Katrina.

==== Environmental policies ====
Upon taking office in 2001, Bush stated his opposition to the Kyoto Protocol, an amendment to the United Nations Framework Convention on Climate Change which seeks to impose mandatory targets for reducing greenhouse gas emissions, citing that the treaty exempted 80% of the world's population and would have cost tens of billions of dollars per year. He also cited that the Senate had voted 95–0 in 1997 on a resolution expressing its disapproval of the protocol.

In May 2001, Bush signed an executive order to create an interagency task force to streamline energy projects, and later signed two other executive orders to tackle environmental issues.

In 2002, Bush proposed the Clear Skies Act of 2003, which aimed at amending the Clean Air Act to reduce air pollution through the use of emissions trading programs. Many experts argued that this legislation would have weakened the original legislation by allowing higher emission rates of pollutants than were previously legal. The initiative was introduced to Congress, but failed to make it out of committee.

Later in 2006, Bush declared the Northwestern Hawaiian Islands a national monument, creating the largest marine reserve to date. The Papahānaumokuākea Marine National Monument comprises 84 million acres (340,000 km^{2}) and is home to 7,000 species of fish, birds, and other marine animals, many of which are specific to only those islands. The move was hailed by conservationists for "its foresight and leadership in protecting this incredible area".

Bush has said he believes that global warming is real and has noted that it is a serious problem, but he asserted there is a "debate over whether it's man-made or naturally caused". The Bush Administration's stance on global warming remained controversial in the scientific and environmental communities. Critics have alleged that the administration misinformed the public and did not do enough to reduce carbon emissions and deter global warming.

==== Energy policies ====
In his 2006 State of the Union Address, Bush declared, "America is addicted to oil" and launched his Advanced Energy Initiative to increase energy development research.

In his 2007 State of the Union Address, Bush renewed his pledge to work toward diminished reliance on foreign oil by reducing fossil fuel consumption and increasing alternative fuel production. Amid high gasoline prices in 2008, Bush lifted a ban on offshore drilling. However, the move was largely symbolic because there was still a federal law banning offshore drilling. Bush said: "This means that the only thing standing between the American people and these vast oil reserves is action from the U.S. Congress." Bush had said in June 2008, "In the long run, the solution is to reduce demand for oil by promoting alternative energy technologies. My administration has worked with Congress to invest in gas-saving technologies like advanced batteries and hydrogen fuel cells ... In the short run, the American economy will continue to rely largely on oil. And that means we need to increase supply, especially here at home. So my administration has repeatedly called on Congress to expand domestic oil production."

In his 2008 State of the Union Address, Bush committed $2 billion over the next three years to a new international fund to promote clean energy technologies and fight climate change, saying, "Along with contributions from other countries, this fund will increase and accelerate the deployment of all forms of cleaner, more efficient technologies in developing nations like India and China, and help leverage substantial private-sector capital by making clean energy projects more financially attractive." He also presented plans to reaffirm the United States' commitment to work with major economies, and, through the UN, to complete an international agreement which will slow, stop, and eventually reverse the growth of greenhouse gases; he stated, "This agreement will be effective only if it includes commitments by every major economy and gives none a free ride."

==== Stem cell research and first veto ====
Federal funding for medical research involving the creation or destruction of human embryos through the Department of Health and Human Services and the National Institutes of Health has been forbidden by law since the passage of the Dickey–Wicker Amendment in 1995. Bush has said he supports adult stem cell research and has supported federal legislation that finances adult stem cell research. However, Bush did not support embryonic stem cell research. On August 9, 2001, Bush signed an executive order lifting the ban on federal funding for the 71 existing "lines" of stem cells, but the ability of these existing lines to provide an adequate medium for testing has been questioned. Testing can be done on only 12 of the original lines, and all approved lines have been cultured in contact with mouse cells, creating safety issues that complicate development and approval of therapies from these lines. On July 19, 2006, Bush used his veto power for the first time in his presidency to veto the Stem Cell Research Enhancement Act. The bill would have repealed the Dickey–Wicker Amendment, thereby permitting federal money to be used for research where stem cells are derived from the destruction of an embryo.

==== Immigration ====
Nearly eight million immigrants came to the U.S. from 2000 to 2005, more than in any other five-year period in the nation's history. Almost half entered illegally. In 2006, Bush urged Congress to allow more than twelve million illegal immigrants to work in the United States with the creation of a "temporary guest-worker program". Bush also urged Congress to provide additional funds for border security and committed to deploying 6,000 National Guard troops to the Mexico–United States border. From May to June 2007, Bush strongly supported the Comprehensive Immigration Reform Act of 2007, which was written by a bipartisan group of senators with the active participation of the Bush administration. The bill envisioned a legalization program for illegal immigrants, with an eventual path to citizenship; the establishment of a guest worker program; a series of border and worksite enforcement measures; a reform of the green card application process and the introduction of a point-based "merit" system for green cards; elimination of "chain migration" and of the Diversity Immigrant Visa; and other measures. Bush argued that the lack of legal status denies the protections of U.S. laws to millions of people who face dangers of poverty and exploitation, and penalizes employers despite a demand for immigrant labor. Bush contended that the proposed bill did not amount to amnesty.

A heated public debate followed, which resulted in a substantial rift within the Republican Party; most conservatives opposed it because of its legalization or amnesty provisions. The bill was eventually defeated in the Senate on June 28, 2007, when a cloture motion failed on a 46–53 vote. Bush expressed disappointment upon the defeat of one of his signature domestic initiatives. The Bush administration later proposed a series of immigration enforcement measures that do not require a change in law.

On September 19, 2010, former Israeli Prime Minister Ehud Olmert said that Bush offered to accept 100,000 Palestinian refugees as American citizens if a permanent settlement had been reached between Israel and the Palestinian Authority.

==== Hurricane Katrina ====
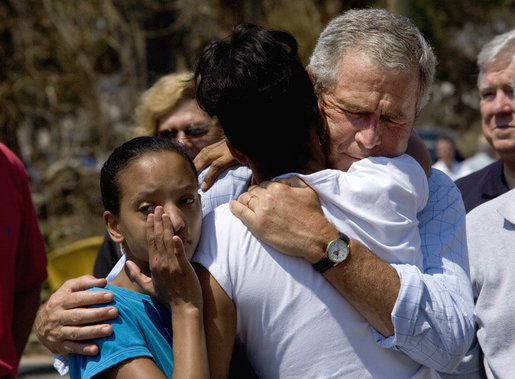
President Bush with hurricane victims in Biloxi on September 2, 2005

Hurricane Katrina struck early in Bush's second term and was one of the most damaging natural disasters in U.S. history. Katrina formed in late August during the 2005 Atlantic hurricane season and devastated much of the north-central Gulf Coast of the United States, particularly New Orleans.

Bush declared a state of emergency in Louisiana on August 27 and in Mississippi and Alabama the following day. The eye of the hurricane made landfall on August 29, and New Orleans began to flood due to levee breaches; later that day, Bush declared a major disaster in Louisiana, officially authorizing FEMA to start using federal funds to assist in the recovery effort.

On August 30, DHS Secretary Michael Chertoff declared it "an incident of national significance", triggering the first use of the newly created National Response Plan. Three days later, on September 2, National Guard troops first entered the city of New Orleans. The same day, Bush toured parts of Louisiana, Mississippi, and Alabama and declared that the success of the recovery effort up to that point was "not enough".

As the disaster in New Orleans intensified, Bush received widespread criticism for downplaying his administration's role in the inadequate response. Leaders attacked Bush for having appointed incompetent leaders to positions of power at FEMA, notably Michael D. Brown; federal resources to respond were also limited as a result of being allocated to the Iraq War, and Bush himself did not act upon warnings of floods. Bush responded to mounting criticism by accepting responsibility for the federal government's failures in its handling of the emergency. It has been argued that with Katrina, Bush passed a political tipping point from which he would not recover.

==== Midterm dismissal of U.S. attorneys ====
During Bush's second term, a controversy arose over the Justice Department's midterm dismissal of seven United States Attorneys. The White House maintained that they were fired for poor performance. Attorney General Alberto Gonzales later resigned over the issue, along with other senior members of the Justice Department. The House Judiciary Committee issued subpoenas for advisers Harriet Miers and Josh Bolten to testify regarding this matter, but Bush directed Miers and Bolten not to comply with those subpoenas, invoking his right of executive privilege. Bush maintained that all his advisers were covered under a broad executive privilege protection to receive candid advice. The Justice Department determined that the President's order was legal.

Although congressional investigations focused on whether the Justice Department and the White House were using the U.S. Attorney positions for political advantage, no official findings have been released. On March 10, 2008, the Congress filed a federal lawsuit to enforce their issued subpoenas. On July 31, 2008, a United States district court judge ruled that Bush's top advisers were not immune from congressional subpoenas.

In all, twelve Justice Department officials resigned rather than testify under oath before Congress. They included Attorney General Alberto Gonzales and his chief of staff Kyle Sampson, Gonzales' liaison to the White House Monica Goodling, aide to the president Karl Rove and his senior aide Sara Taylor. In addition, legal counsel to the president Harriet Miers and deputy chief of staff to the president Joshua Bolten were both found in contempt of Congress.

In 2010, the Justice Department investigator concluded that though political considerations did play a part in as many as four of the attorney firings, the firings were "inappropriately political" but not criminal. According to the prosecutors, there was insufficient evidence to pursue prosecution for any criminal offense.

=== Foreign policy ===
During his presidential campaign, Bush's foreign policy platform included support for stronger economic and political relationships with Latin America, especially Mexico, and a reduction of involvement in "nation-building" and other small-scale military engagements. The administration pursued a national missile defense. Bush was an advocate of China's entry into the World Trade Organization.

Bush began his second term with an emphasis on improving strained relations with European nations. He appointed long-time adviser Karen Hughes to oversee a global public relations campaign. Bush lauded the pro-democracy struggles in Georgia and Ukraine.

In March 2006, Bush visited India on a trip focused particularly on areas of nuclear energy, counter-terrorism co-operation, and discussions that would eventually lead to the India–United States Civil Nuclear Agreement. This was in stark contrast to decades of U.S. policy, such as the stance taken by his predecessor, Bill Clinton, whose approach and response to India after the 1998 nuclear tests has been characterized as "sanctions and hectoring".

Midway through Bush's second term, questions arose whether Bush was retreating from his freedom and democracy agenda, which was highlighted in policy changes toward some oil-rich former Soviet republics in central Asia.

Bush signed the Strategic Offensive Reductions Treaty with Russia. He withdrew U.S. support for several international agreements, including, in 2002, the Anti-Ballistic Missile Treaty (ABM) with Russia. This marked the first time in post-World War II history that the United States had withdrawn from a major international arms treaty. Russian president Vladimir Putin stated that American withdrawal from the ABM Treaty was a mistake.

Bush emphasized a careful approach to the conflict between Israel and the Palestinians; he denounced Palestine Liberation Organization leader Yasser Arafat for his support of violence, but sponsored dialogues between Prime Minister Ariel Sharon and Palestinian National Authority president Mahmoud Abbas. Bush supported Sharon's unilateral disengagement plan, and lauded the democratic elections held in Palestine after Arafat's death.

Bush also expressed U.S. support for the defense of Taiwan following the stand-off in April 2001 with China over the Hainan Island incident, when an EP-3E Aries II surveillance aircraft collided with a People's Liberation Army Air Force jet, leading to the detention of U.S. personnel. From 2003 to 2004, Bush authorized U.S. military intervention in Haiti and Liberia to protect U.S. interests. Bush condemned the militia attacks in Darfur and denounced the killings in Sudan as genocide. Bush said an international peacekeeping presence was critical in Darfur, but he opposed referring the situation to the International Criminal Court.

On June 10, 2007, Bush met with Albanian Prime Minister Sali Berisha and became the first president to visit Albania. He later voiced his support for the independence of Kosovo.

In early 2008, Bush vowed full support for admitting Ukraine and Georgia into NATO despite Russia's opposition to the further enlargement of NATO. During the 2008 Russo-Georgian diplomatic crisis, Bush condemned Russia for recognizing the separatist government of South Ossetia. When Russian troops invaded Georgia later that summer, Bush said: "Bullying and intimidation are not acceptable ways to conduct foreign policy in the 21st century."

==== September 11 attacks ====
President Bush addressing the nation from the White House at 8:30 pm ET

The September 11 terrorist attacks were a major turning point in Bush's presidency. That evening, he addressed the nation from the Oval Office, promising a strong response to the attacks. He also emphasized the need for the nation to come together and comfort the families of the victims. Three days after the attacks, Bush visited Ground Zero and met with then-New York City Mayor Rudy Giuliani, firefighters, police officers, and volunteers. Bush addressed the gathering via a megaphone while standing on rubble: "I can hear you. The rest of the world hears you. And the people who knocked these buildings down will hear all of us soon."

In a September 20 speech, Bush condemned Osama bin Laden and his organization al-Qaeda, and issued an ultimatum to the Taliban regime in Afghanistan, where bin Laden was operating, to "hand over the terrorists, or ... share in their fate". The Taliban's leader, Mullah Omar, refused to hand over bin Laden.

The continued presence of U.S. troops in Saudi Arabia after the 1991 Gulf War was one of the stated motivations behind the September 11 attacks. In 2003, the U.S. withdrew most of its troops from Saudi Arabia.

==== War on terror ====
In Bush's September 20 speech, he declared that "our war on terror begins with Al Qaeda, but it does not end there." In his January 29, 2002 State of the Union Address, he asserted that an "axis of evil" consisting of North Korea, Iran, and Ba'athist Iraq was "arming to threaten the peace of the world" and "pose[d] a grave and growing danger". The Bush Administration asserted both a right and the intention to wage preemptive war, or preventive war. This became the basis for the Bush Doctrine, which weakened the unprecedented levels of international and domestic support for the United States that had followed the September 11 attacks.

Dissent and criticism of Bush's leadership in the war on terror increased as the war in Iraq continued. The Iraq war sparked many protests and riots in different parts of the world. In 2006, a National Intelligence Estimate concluded that the Iraq War had become the "cause célèbre for jihadists".

==== Afghanistan invasion ====
On October 7, 2001, U.S. and British forces initiated bombing campaigns that led to the arrival of Northern Alliance troops in Kabul on November 13. The main goals of the war were to defeat the Taliban, drive al-Qaeda out of Afghanistan, and capture key al-Qaeda leaders. In December 2001, the Pentagon reported that the Taliban had been defeated, but cautioned that the war would go on to continue weakening Taliban and al-Qaeda leaders. Later that month the UN had installed the Afghan Transitional Administration chaired by Hamid Karzai.

Efforts to kill or capture al-Qaeda leader Osama bin Laden failed as he escaped a battle in December 2001 in the mountainous region of Tora Bora, which the Bush Administration later acknowledged to have resulted from a failure to commit enough U.S. ground troops. It was not until May 2011, two years after Bush left office, that Bin Laden was killed by U.S. forces under the Obama administration.

Despite the initial success in driving the Taliban from power in Kabul, by early 2003 the Taliban was regrouping, amassing new funds and recruits. The 2005 failure of Operation Red Wings showed that the Taliban had returned. In 2006, the Taliban insurgency appeared larger, fiercer and better organized than expected, with large-scale allied offensives such as Operation Mountain Thrust attaining limited success. As a result, Bush deployed 3,500 additional troops to the country in March 2007.

==== Iraq invasion ====
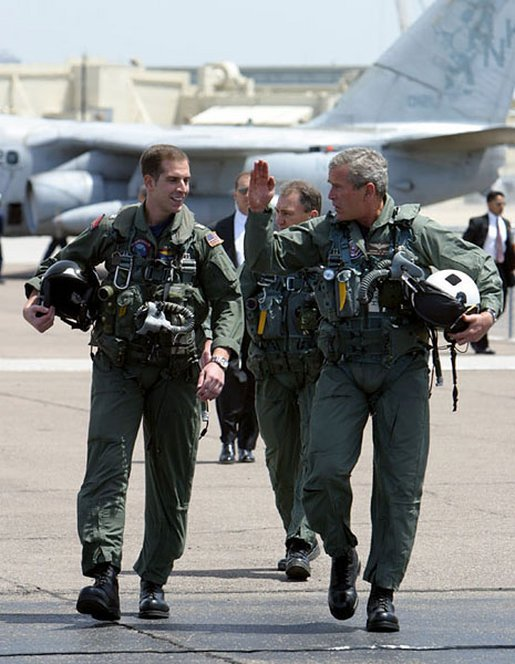
President Bush, with Naval Flight Officer Lieutenant Ryan Philips, after landing on the USS Abraham Lincoln prior to his Mission Accomplished speech, May 1, 2003

Beginning with his January 29, 2002 State of the Union address, Bush began publicly focusing attention on Iraq, which he labeled as part of an "axis of evil" allied with terrorists and posing "a grave and growing danger" to U.S. interests through possession of weapons of mass destruction.

In the latter half of 2002, CIA reports contained assertions of Saddam Hussein's intent of reconstituting nuclear weapons programs, not properly accounting for Iraqi biological and chemical weapons, and that some Iraqi missiles had a range greater than allowed by the UN sanctions. Contentions that the Bush Administration manipulated or exaggerated the threat and evidence of Iraq's weapons of mass destruction capabilities would eventually become a major point of criticism for the president.

In late 2002 and early 2003, Bush urged the United Nations to enforce Iraqi disarmament mandates, precipitating a diplomatic crisis. In November 2002, Hans Blix and Mohamed ElBaradei led UN weapons inspectors in Iraq, but were advised by the U.S. to depart the country four days prior to the U.S. invasion, despite their requests for more time to complete their tasks. The U.S. initially sought a UN Security Council resolution authorizing the use of military force but dropped the bid for UN approval due to vigorous opposition from several countries. The Bush administration's claim that the Iraq War was part of the war on terror had been questioned and contested by political analysts.

More than 20 nations, most notably the United Kingdom, joined the United States in invading Iraq as part of the "coalition of the willing". They launched the invasion on March 20, 2003. The Iraqi military was quickly defeated. The capital, Baghdad, fell on April 9, 2003. On May 1, Bush declared the end of major combat operations in Iraq. The initial success of U.S. operations increased his popularity, but the U.S. and allied forces faced a growing insurgency led by sectarian groups; Bush's "Mission Accomplished" speech was later criticized as premature. From 2004 until 2007, the situation in Iraq deteriorated further, with some observers arguing that there was a full-scale civil war in Iraq. Bush's policies met with criticism, including demands domestically to set a timetable to withdraw troops from Iraq. The 2006 report of the bipartisan Iraq Study Group, led by James Baker, concluded that the situation in Iraq was "grave and deteriorating". While Bush admitted there were strategic mistakes made in regard to the stability of Iraq, he maintained he would not change the overall Iraq strategy. According to Iraq Body Count, some 251,000 Iraqis have been killed in the civil war following the U.S.-led invasion, including at least 163,841 civilians.

In January 2005, elections recognized by the West as free and fair were held in Iraq for the first time in 50 years. This led to the election of Jalal Talabani as president and Nouri al-Maliki as Prime Minister of Iraq. A referendum to approve a constitution in Iraq was held in October 2005, supported by most Shiites and many Kurds.

On January 10, 2007, Bush launched a surge of 21,500 more troops for Iraq, as well as a job program for Iraqis, more reconstruction proposals, and $1.2 billion (equivalent to $1.9 billion in 2025) for these programs. On May 1, 2007, Bush used his second-ever veto to reject a bill setting a deadline for the withdrawal of U.S. troops, saying the debate over the conflict was "understandable" but insisting that a continued U.S. presence there was crucial.

In March 2008, Bush praised the Iraqi government's "bold decision" to launch the Battle of Basra against the Mahdi Army, calling it "a defining moment in the history of a free Iraq". He said he would carefully weigh recommendations from his commanding General David Petraeus and Ambassador Ryan Crocker about how to proceed after the end of the military buildup in the summer of 2008. He also praised the Iraqis' legislative achievements, including a pension law, a revised de-Baathification law, a new budget, an amnesty law, and a provincial powers measure that, he said, set the stage for the Iraqi elections. By July 2008, American troop deaths had reached their lowest number since the war began, and due to increased stability in Iraq, Bush withdrew additional American forces. During Bush's last visit to Iraq in December 2008, Iraqi journalist Muntadhar al-Zaidi threw both of his shoes at him during an official press conference with Iraqi Prime Minister Nouri al-Maliki. Al-Zaidi yelled that the shoes were a "farewell kiss" and "for the widows and orphans and all those killed in Iraq".

In March 2010, the Center for Public Integrity released a report that Bush's administration had made more than 900 false pretenses in a two-year period about the alleged threat of Iraq against the United States, as his rationale to engage in war in Iraq.

==== Surveillance ====
Following the terrorist attacks of September 11, Bush issued an executive order that authorized the President's Surveillance Program. The new directive allowed the National Security Agency to monitor communications between suspected terrorists outside the U.S. and parties within the U.S. without obtaining a warrant, which previously had been required by the Foreign Intelligence Surveillance Act. As of 2009, the other provisions of the program remained highly classified. Once the Department of Justice Office of Legal Counsel questioned its original legal opinion that FISA did not apply in a time of war, the program was subsequently re-authorized by the President on the basis that the warrant requirements of FISA were implicitly superseded by the subsequent passage of the Authorization for Use of Military Force Against Terrorists. The program proved to be controversial; critics of the administration and organizations such as the American Bar Association argued that it was illegal. In August 2006, a U.S. district court judge ruled that the NSA electronic surveillance program was unconstitutional, but on July 6, 2007, the ruling was vacated by the United States Court of Appeals for the Sixth Circuit on the grounds that the plaintiffs lacked standing. On January 17, 2007, Attorney General Alberto Gonzales informed U.S. Senate leaders that the program would not be reauthorized by the President, but would be subjected to judicial oversight. Later in 2007, the NSA launched a replacement for the program, referred to as PRISM, which was subject to the oversight of the United States Foreign Intelligence Surveillance Court. This program was not publicly revealed until reports by The Washington Post and The Guardian emerged in June 2013.

==== Interrogation policies ====
Bush authorized the CIA to use waterboarding and several other "enhanced interrogation techniques" that several critics, including Barack Obama, would label as torture. Between 2002 and 2003, the CIA considered certain enhanced interrogation techniques, such as waterboarding, to be legal based on secret Justice Department legal opinions arguing that terror detainees were not protected by the Geneva Conventions' ban on torture, which was described as "an unconstitutional infringement of the President's authority to conduct war". The CIA had exercised the technique on certain key terrorist suspects under authority given to it in the Bybee Memo from the Attorney General, though the memo was later withdrawn. While not permitted by the U.S. Army Field Manuals which assert "that harsh interrogation tactics elicit unreliable information", the Bush administration believed these enhanced interrogations "provided critical information" to preserve American lives. Critics, such as former CIA officer Bob Baer, have stated that information was suspect, "you can get anyone to confess to anything if the torture's bad enough."

On October 17, 2006, Bush signed the Military Commissions Act of 2006 into law. The new rule was enacted in the wake of the Supreme Court's decision in Hamdan v. Rumsfeld, 548 U.S. 557 (2006), which allowed the U.S. government to prosecute unlawful enemy combatants by military commission rather than a standard trial. The law also denied the detainees access to habeas corpus and barred the torture of prisoners. The provision of the law allowed the president to determine what constitutes "torture".

On March 8, 2008, Bush vetoed H.R. 2082, a bill that would have expanded congressional oversight over the intelligence community and banned the use of waterboarding as well as other forms of interrogation not permitted under the United States Army Field Manual on Human Intelligence Collector Operations, saying that "the bill Congress sent me would take away one of the most valuable tools in the War on Terror". In April 2009, the ACLU sued and won release of the secret memos that had authorized the Bush administration's interrogation tactics. One memo detailed specific interrogation tactics including a footnote that described waterboarding as torture and stated that the form of waterboarding used by the CIA was far more intense than authorized by the Justice Department.

==== North Korea condemnation ====
Bush publicly condemned Kim Jong-il of North Korea and identified North Korea as one of three states in an "axis of evil". He said that "the United States of America will not permit the world's most dangerous regimes to threaten us with the world's most destructive weapons." Within months, "both countries had walked away from their respective commitments under the U.S.–DPRK Agreed Framework of October 1994." North Korea's October 9, 2006, detonation of a nuclear device further complicated Bush's foreign policy, which centered for both terms of his presidency on "[preventing] the terrorists and regimes who seek chemical, biological, or nuclear weapons from threatening the United States and the world". Bush condemned North Korea's position, reaffirmed his commitment to "a nuclear-free Korean Peninsula", and said that "transfer of nuclear weapons or material by North Korea to states or non-state entities would be considered a grave threat to the United States", for which North Korea would be held accountable. On May 7, 2007, North Korea agreed to shut down its nuclear reactors immediately pending the release of frozen funds held in a foreign bank account. This was a result of a series of three-way talks initiated by the United States and including China. On September 2, 2007, North Korea agreed to disclose and dismantle all its nuclear programs by the end of 2007. By May 2009, North Korea had restarted its nuclear program and threatened to attack South Korea.

On June 22, 2010, Bush said: "While South Korea prospers, the people of North Korea have suffered profoundly," adding that communism had resulted in dire poverty, mass starvation, and brutal suppression. "In recent years," he went on to say, "the suffering has been compounded by the leader who wasted North Korea's precious few resources on personal luxuries and nuclear weapons programs."

==== Syria sanctions ====
Bush expanded economic sanctions on Syria. In 2003, Bush signed the Syria Accountability Act, which expanded sanctions on Syria. In early 2007, the Treasury Department, acting on a June 2005 executive order, froze American bank accounts of Syria's Higher Institute of Applied Science and Technology, Electronics Institute, and National Standards and Calibration Laboratory. Bush's order prohibits Americans from doing business with these institutions suspected of helping spread weapons of mass destruction and being supportive of terrorism. Under separate executive orders signed by Bush in 2004 and later 2007, the Treasury Department froze the assets of two Lebanese and two Syrians, accusing them of activities to "undermine the legitimate political process in Lebanon" in November 2007. Those designated included: Assaad Halim Hardan, a member of Lebanon's parliament and former leader of the Syrian Socialist National Party; Wi'am Wahhab, a former member of Lebanon's government (Minister of the Environment) under Prime Minister Omar Karami (2004–2005); Hafiz Makhluf, a colonel and senior official in the Syrian General Intelligence Directorate and a cousin of Syrian president Bashar al-Assad; and Muhammad Nasif Khayrbik, identified as a close adviser to Assad.

==== AIDS Relief ====
In the State of the Union address in January 2003, Bush outlined a five-year strategy for global emergency AIDS relief, the President's Emergency Plan for AIDS Relief (PEPFAR). Bush announced $15 billion for this effort, which directly supported life-saving antiretroviral treatment for more than 3.2 million men, women and children worldwide. The U.S. government had spent some $44 billion on the project since 2003 (a figure which includes $7 billion contributed to the Global Fund to Fight AIDS, Tuberculosis, and Malaria, a multilateral organization), which saved an estimated five million lives by 2013. The New York Times correspondent Peter Baker wrote in 2013 that "Bush did more to stop AIDS and more to help Africa than any president before or since." By 2023, PEPFAR was estimated to have saved over 25 million lives, alleviating the severity of the HIV/AIDS epidemic especially in Sub-Saharan Africa, and was called "George W. Bush's greatest accomplishment" by Vox.

=== Security incidents ===
==== 2001 White House shooting ====
On February 7, 2001, while Bush was in the residence area of the White House, Robert W. Pickett discharged a number of shots from a Taurus .38 Special revolver "in the general direction" of the White House. Pickett was shot in the knee by a U.S. Secret Service agent and arrested. Furthermore, he was initially charged with discharging a firearm during a crime, carrying a 10-year mandatory sentence, but following a plea agreement, Pickett instead entered a guilty plea to a firearms violation and an Alford plea to assaulting a federal officer. He was sentenced to three years at the Federal Medical Center, Rochester followed by three years of probation.

==== 2005 Tbilisi grenade attack ====
On May 10, 2005, while President Bush was giving a speech in Freedom Square, Vladimir Arutyunian threw a live Soviet-made RGD-5 hand grenade toward the podium. It landed in the crowd about 61 feet (19 m) from the podium after hitting a girl, but it did not detonate because a red tartan handkerchief was wrapped tightly around it, preventing the safety lever from detaching. Georgian president Mikheil Saakashvili was seated nearby. After escaping that day, Arutyunian was arrested in July 2005, and given a life sentence in January 2006.

==== 2008 Baghdad shoe-throwing incident ====
On December 14, 2008, Muntadhar al-Zaidi, an Iraqi journalist, threw both of his shoes at Bush during a press conference in Baghdad. Bush was not injured, having ducked the pair of shoes. However, White House press secretary Dana Perino received a bruise on her face after being hit by a microphone boom knocked over by security. Al-Zaidi received a three-year prison sentence which was reduced to one year. On September 15, 2009, he was released early for good behavior.

=== Judicial appointments ===
==== Supreme Court ====
On July 19, 2005, following the retirement of Associate Justice Sandra Day O'Connor on July 1, Bush nominated federal appellate judge John Roberts as her replacement; however, following the death of Chief Justice William Rehnquist on September 3, the still-pending nomination was withdrawn on September 5, with Bush instead nominating Roberts to be the next Chief Justice of the United States. He was confirmed by the Senate on September 29, 2005.

On October 3, 2005, Bush nominated White House Counsel Harriet Miers to succeed O'Connor; however, Miers withdrew her nomination on October 27 after encountering significant opposition from both parties, who found her to be ill-prepared and uninformed on the law. Finally, on October 31, Bush nominated federal appellate judge Samuel Alito, who was confirmed by the Senate to replace O'Connor on January 31, 2006.

==== Other courts ====
In addition to his two Supreme Court appointments, Bush appointed 62 judges to the United States courts of appeals and 261 judges to the United States district courts.

== Post-presidency (2009–present) ==
=== Residence ===
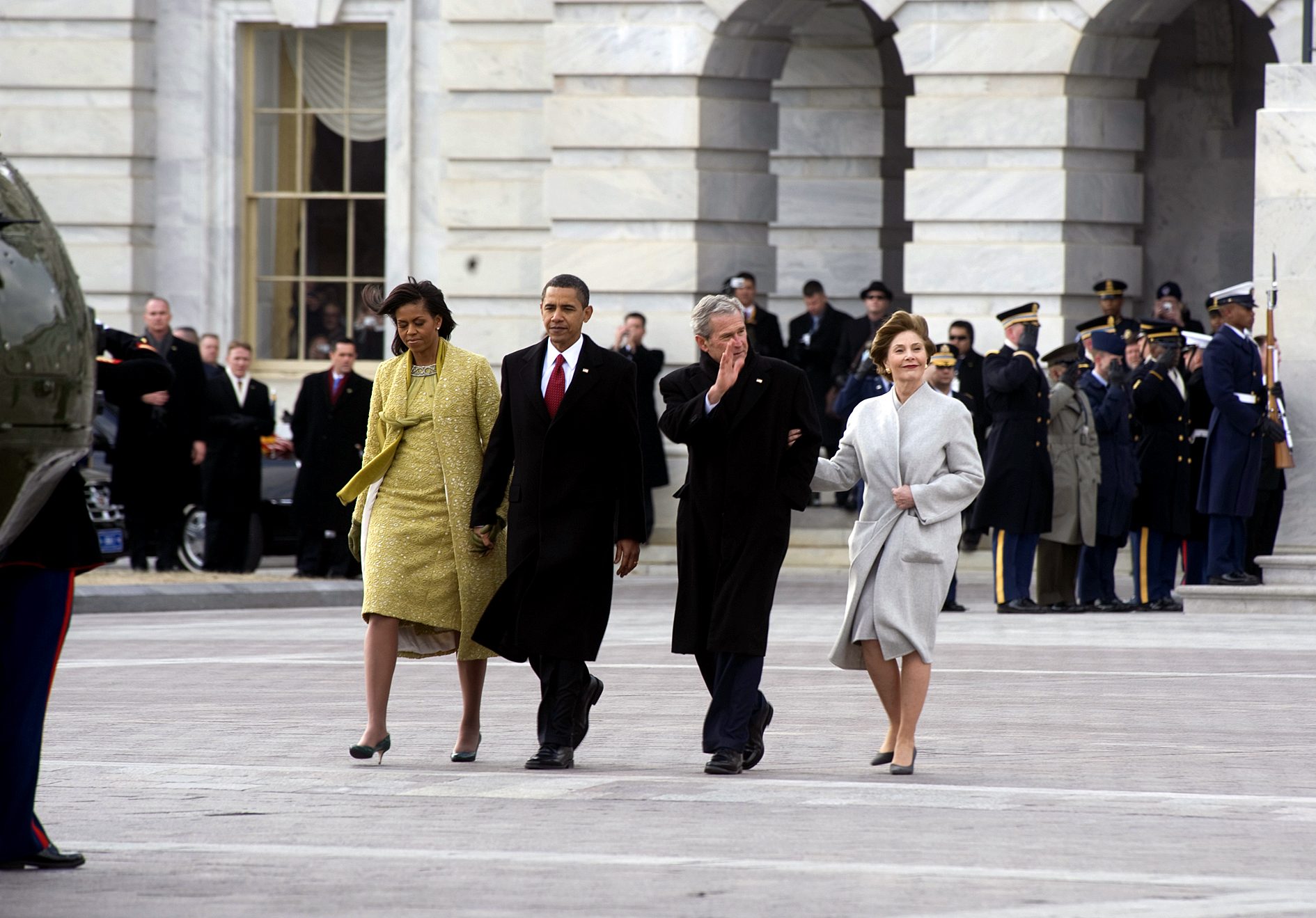
Former president George W. Bush and his wife being escorted to a waiting helicopter by President Barack Obama and First Lady Michelle Obama on January 20, 2009

After the inauguration of Barack Obama, Bush and his family flew from Andrews Air Force Base to a homecoming celebration in Midland, Texas, and then returned to their ranch in Crawford, Texas. They bought a home in the Preston Hollow neighborhood of Dallas where they live.

Bush made regular appearances at various events throughout the Dallas–Fort Worth area, including the opening coin toss at the Dallas Cowboys' first game in the new Cowboys Stadium in Arlington and an April 2009 Texas Rangers game, where he thanked the people of Dallas for helping him settle in, which was met with a standing ovation. He also attended every home playoff game during the Rangers' 2010 season and, accompanied by his father, threw out the ceremonial first pitch at the Rangers Ballpark in Arlington for Game 4 of the 2010 World Series on October 31. He also threw the first pitch in Game 1 of the 2023 World Series.

On August 6, 2013, Bush was successfully treated for a coronary artery blockage with a stent. The blockage had been found during an annual medical examination.

In reaction to the 2016 shooting of Dallas police officers, Bush said: "Laura and I are heartbroken by the heinous acts of violence in our city last night. Murdering the innocent is always evil, never more so than when the lives taken belong to those who protect our families and communities."

=== Publications and appearances ===
Since leaving office, Bush has kept a relatively low profile. Bush has spoken in favor of increased global participation of women in politics and societal matters.

In March 2009, he delivered his first post-presidency speech in Calgary, Alberta, appeared via video on The Colbert Report during which he praised U.S. troops for earning a "special place in American history", and attended the funeral of Senator Ted Kennedy. Bush was a motivational speaker in October at the "Get Motivated" seminar in Dallas. In the aftermath of the Fort Hood shooting the Bushes paid a visit to the survivors and the victims' families the day following the shooting, having contacted the base commander requesting the visit be private and not involve press coverage.

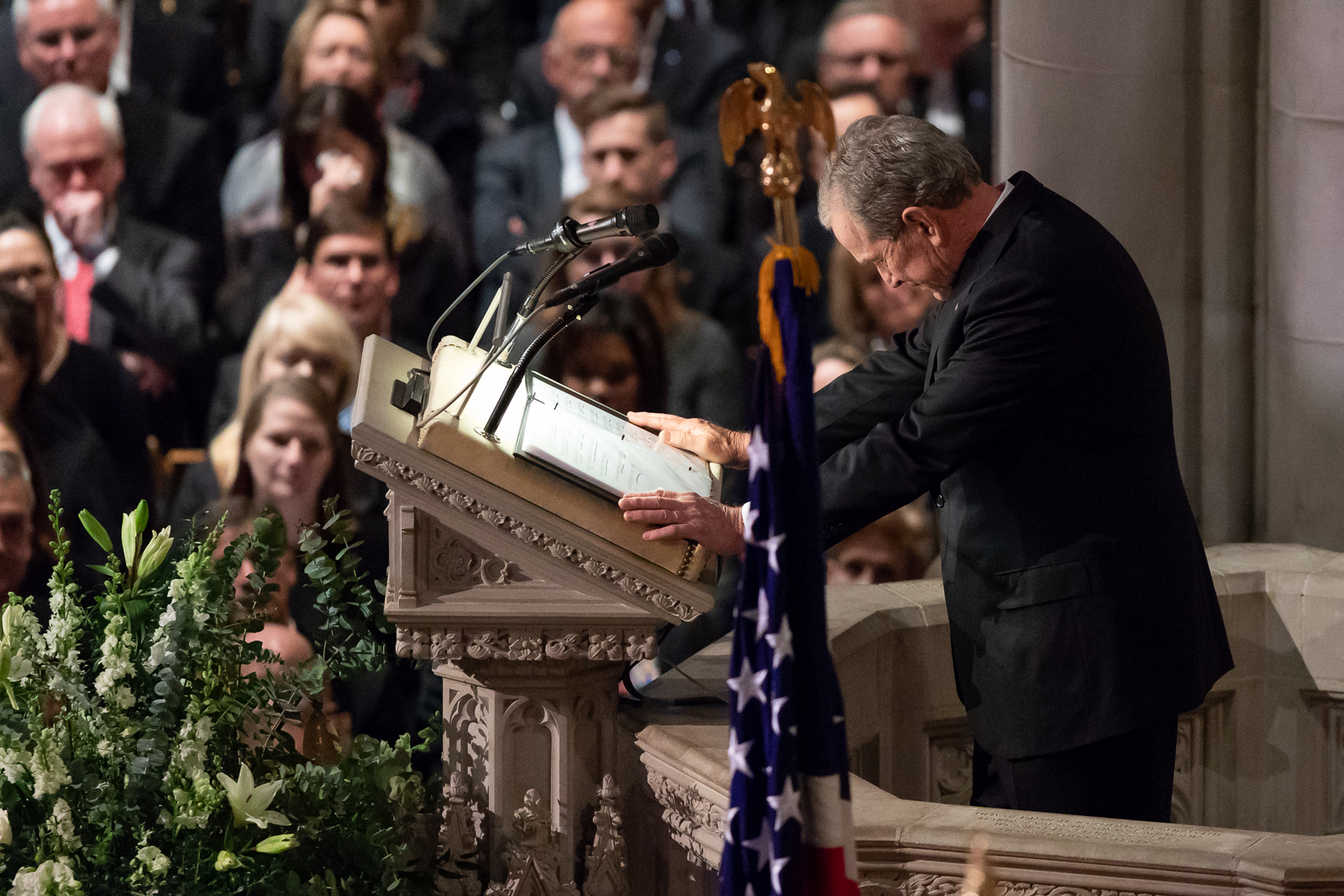
Bush eulogizing his father at the National Cathedral on December 5, 2018

Bush released his memoirs, Decision Points in November 2010. Promoting the book, Bush said he considered his biggest accomplishment to be keeping "the country safe amid a real danger", and his greatest failure his inability to secure the passage of Social Security reform. He made news defending his administration's enhanced interrogation techniques, specifically the waterboarding of Khalid Sheikh Mohammed, saying, "I'd do it again to save lives."

In 2012, he wrote the foreword to The 4% Solution: Unleashing the Economic Growth America Needs, a book published by the George W. Bush Presidential Center. He presented the book at the Parkland Memorial Hospital in Dallas. Bush did not physically appear in that year's Republican National Convention (where Mitt Romney obtained the party's nomination), instead appearing in a videotape, in which he –alongside his father– explained his reasons for supporting Romney.

Bush appeared on NBC's The Tonight Show with Jay Leno in November 2013, along with his wife Laura. When asked by Leno why he does not comment publicly about the Obama administration, Bush said: "I don't think it's good for the country to have a former president criticize his successor." Despite this, Bush vocally disagreed with Obama's withdrawal of U.S. troops from Iraq in 2011, calling it a "strategic blunder". In December, Bush traveled with Obama to the memorial service of South African president and civil rights leader Nelson Mandela. They joined former presidents Bill Clinton and Jimmy Carter.

Alongside the 2014 United States–Africa Leaders Summit, Bush, Michelle Obama, the State Department, and the George W. Bush Institute hosted a forum on education and health with the spouses of the African leaders attending the summit. Bush urged African leaders to avoid discriminatory laws that make the treatment of HIV/AIDS more difficult. On November 2, Bush spoke at an event to business and civic leaders at the George W. Bush Presidential Library and Museum to raise awareness of the upcoming Museum of the Bible in Washington, D.C. On November 11, Bush published a biography of his father titled 41: A Portrait of My Father.

In an interview published by Israel Hayom magazine in June 2015, Bush said "boots on the ground" would be needed to defeat the Islamic State of Iraq and the Levant (ISIS). He added that people had said during his presidency he should withdraw American troops from Iraq, but he chose the opposite, sending 30,000 more troops to defeat Al Qaeda in Iraq, and that they indeed were defeated. Bush was asked about Iran but declined to answer, stating that any answer he gives would be interpreted as undermining Obama.

During the early stages of the 2016 Republican presidential primaries, Bush spoke and campaigned for his brother Jeb Bush at a South Carolina rally. However, the party's nomination went to Donald Trump, whom Bush refused to endorse. He did not attend the party's convention. On the eve of Trump's nomination, it was reported that Bush had privately expressed concern about the direction of the Republican Party, telling a group of former advisors that "I'm worried that I will be the last Republican president." According to a spokesperson for the Bushes, he did not vote for Trump or Hillary Clinton in the general election, instead leaving his ballot blank.

After the 2016 elections, Bush, his father, and his brother Jeb called Trump to congratulate him on his victory. On January 20, 2017, Bush and his wife attended Trump's first inauguration. Images of Bush struggling to put on a rain poncho became an internet meme. While leaving the event, Bush allegedly described it, and Trump's inaugural address in particular, as "some weird shit".

In February 2017, Bush released a book of his own portraits of veterans called Portraits of Courage. In August, following the white nationalist Unite the Right rally, Bush and his father released a statement condemning the violence and ideologies present. Bush gave a speech in New York where he noted of the political climate, "Bigotry seems emboldened. Our politics seems more vulnerable to conspiracy theories and outright fabrication...Bigotry in any form is blasphemy against the American creed and it means the very identity of our nation depends on the passing of civic ideals to the next generation", while urging citizens to oppose threats to democracy and be positive role models for young people. The speech was widely interpreted as a denouncement of Trump and his ideologies, despite Bush not mentioning Trump by name.

In September 2018, Bush and his wife attended the funeral of John McCain at the Washington National Cathedral where Bush delivered remarks. On November 30, his father died at his home. Shortly before his death, Bush was able to talk with his father on the phone; his father responded with what would be his last words, "I love you too". Bush attended his father's funeral on December 5, delivering a eulogy. In May 2019, on the tenth anniversary of former South Korean president Roh Moo-hyun's death, Bush visited South Korea to pay his respects to Roh, delivering a eulogy.

On June 1, 2020, Bush released a statement addressing the murder of George Floyd and the nationwide protests. Bush wrote that he and former first lady Laura Bush "are anguished by the brutal suffocation of George Floyd and disturbed by the injustice and fear that suffocate our country". He elaborated on the racial injustices perpetrated by the police, saying that "it is time for America to examine our tragic failures" and adding "Many doubt the justice of our country, and with good reason. Black people see the repeated violation of their rights without an urgent and adequate response from American institutions". On July 30, Bush and his wife, along with former presidents Clinton and Obama, spoke at the funeral for civil rights leader and congressman John Lewis at Ebenezer Baptist Church in Atlanta.

Bush did not give any endorsements during the 2020 presidential election, but held a virtual fundraiser for U.S. senators Susan Collins (R-ME), Cory Gardner (R-CO), Martha McSally (R-AZ), and Thom Tillis (R-NC). All four were up for reelection and were struggling in the polls. He did not attend the 2020 Republican National Convention where Trump was re-nominated. In 2021, Bush told People magazine that he did not vote for either Trump or Joe Biden. Instead, he wrote in Condoleezza Rice, who served as his national security advisor from 2001 to 2005 and as his secretary of state from 2005 to 2009. When the election was called for Biden, Bush congratulated him and running mate Kamala Harris. He congratulated Trump and his supporters "on a hard-fought campaign". Bush's outreach to Biden was notable since Republican candidate Trump had not conceded. Bush issued a statement saying that while Trump was within his rights to call for recounts, he believed the election was "fundamentally fair" and that "its outcome is clear", and said he would offer Biden "my prayers for his success, and my pledge to help in any way I can", as he had for Trump and Obama.

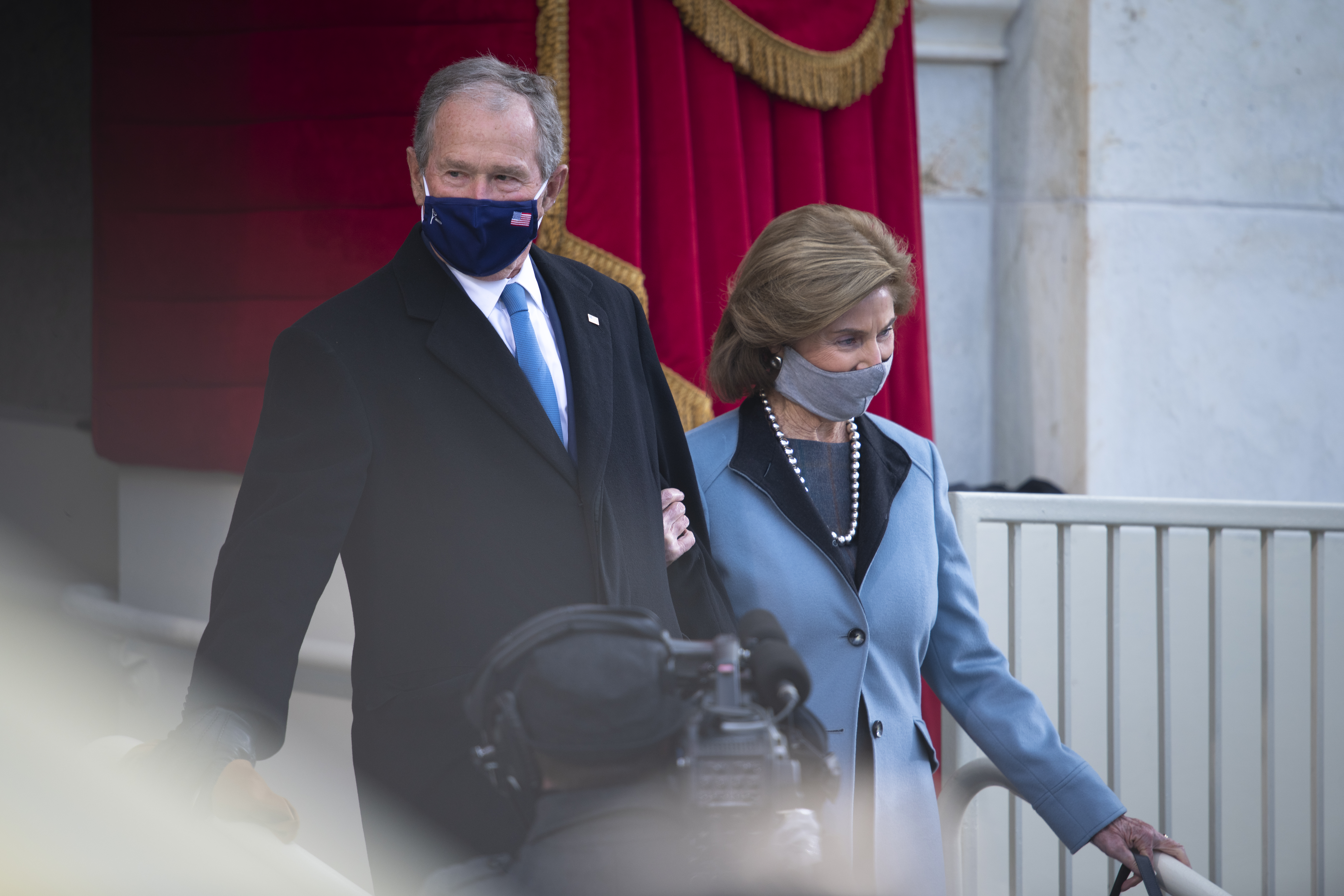
George W. Bush and Laura at the inauguration of Joe Biden on January 20, 2021

On January 6, 2021, following the U.S. Capitol attack, Bush denounced the violence and attack alongside the three other living former presidents, releasing a statement saying that "this is how election results are disputed in a banana republic, not our democratic republic", and that "it is a sickening and heartbreaking sight". He echoed president-elect Biden's message saying that what occurred at the Capitol was an "insurrection". On January 20, Bush and his wife attended Biden's inauguration.

Bush opposed Biden's withdrawal of American troops from Afghanistan, saying it made him "concerned" and that it had the potential to "create a vacuum, and into that vacuum is likely to come people who treat women as second-class citizens". On July 14, 2021, Bush reaffirmed his opposition to the troop withdrawal, calling the plan "a mistake".

On September 11, 2021, the 20th anniversary of the September 11 attacks, Bush gave a speech at the Flight 93 National Memorial, praising the heroism of the people on Flight 93 and the spirit of America. He said that he "saw millions of people instinctively grab for a neighbor's hand and rally to the cause of one another. That is the America I know."

Bush condemned the assassination attempt on Trump, who was the presumptive Republican nominee, in July 2024, calling it "cowardly" and applauding the Secret Service's response. However, Bush did not participate in the 2024 Republican National Convention, which took place two days after the attempt. Bush chose not to endorse any candidate in the 2024 presidential election. After the election was called for Trump, Bush offered his congratulations to him and his running mate JD Vance. He stated that the large turnout was a "sign of the health of our republic and the strength of our democratic institutions". He congratulated Biden and Harris on their years of public office. On January 20, 2025, Bush and his wife attended Trump's second inauguration. On September 10, 2025, Bush released a statement condemning the assassination of Charlie Kirk: "Today, a young man was murdered in cold blood while expressing his political views. It happened on a college campus, where the open exchange of opposing ideas should be sacrosanct...Violence and vitriol must be purged from the public square. Members of other political parties are not our enemies; they are our fellow citizens. May God bless Charlie Kirk and his family, and may God guide America toward civility."

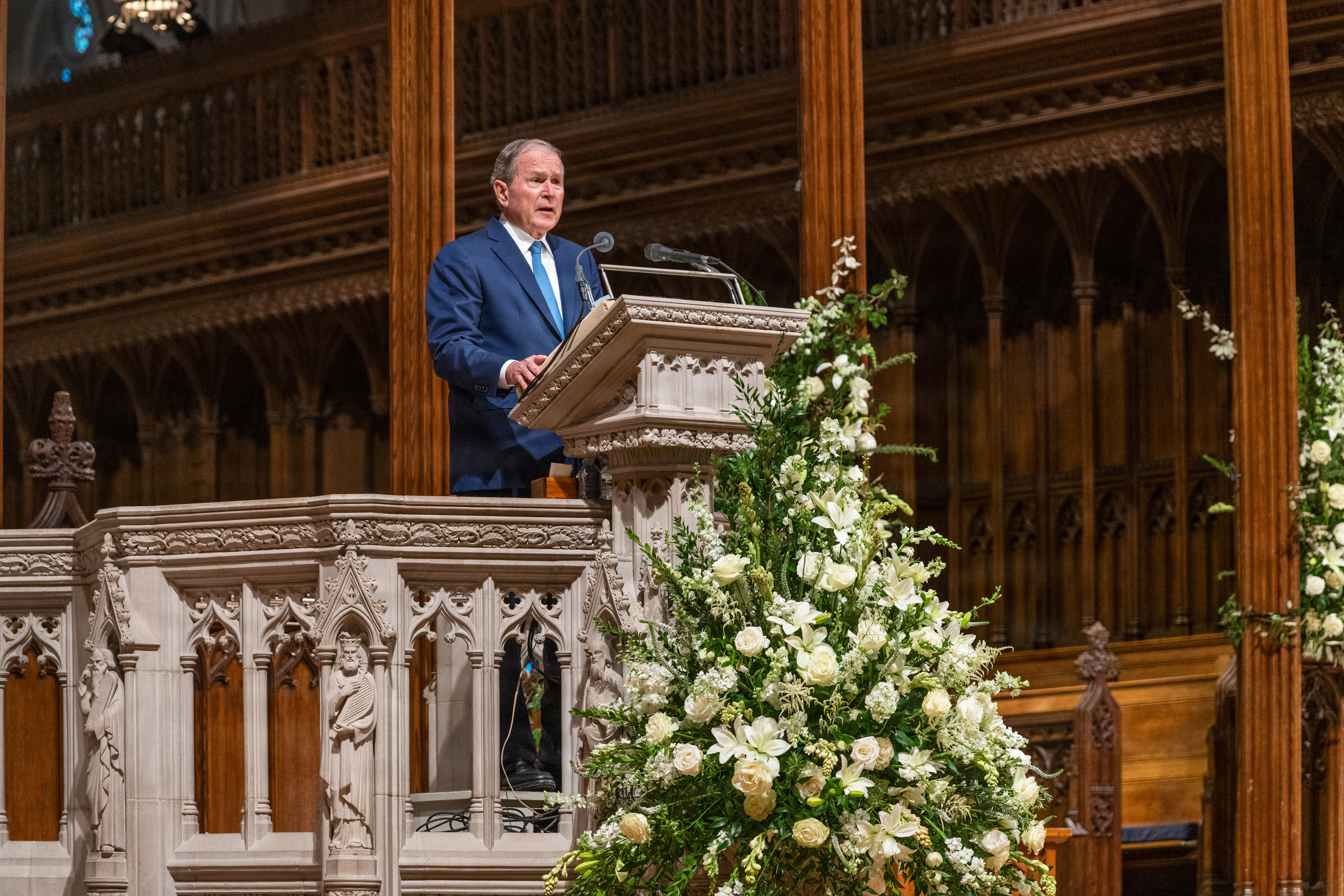
Bush attending Cheney's funeral on November 20, 2025

After Peyton Manning tried to get Bush to appear on Monday Night Football with Peyton and Eli for five years, Bush relented. On the show on November 17, 2025, Bush said that he grew up a Houston Astros and a Houston Oilers fan watching Earl Campbell and Dan Pastorini (he called him Dante Pastorini) play for the Oilers. Bush also mentioned Billy "White Shoes" Johnson. Bush said that he and his group bought the Texas Rangers and he moved to Dallas the same year that Jerry Jones bought the Dallas Cowboys. Bush got to know Jones well and switched his allegiance to the Cowboys. Bush mentioned that his father liked the Houston Texans and the Astros, calling him a loyal Houston guy. He said his father was a friend of the Texans' owner. When Manning asked George W. Bush if he thought that he would have a job in public service, Bush answered no, adding that he would have behaved a lot better in college if he had known. "I admired my dad a lot... he never said, this is what you have to do with your life, he just said, here's this kind of way I'd like you to live, honesty and decency and compassion, but you be what you want to be... it took me a while to figure out what I wanted to be, by the way."

Bush talked about growing up in Midland, Texas. He said, "You either pick art or football. I chose football." He has run marathons. Willie Mays has been a hero of his. On November 20, 2025, Bush and his wife attended the funeral of his former vice president Cheney at the Washington National Cathedral, where Bush spoke. Bush and his wife attended the dedication ceremony of the Barack Obama Presidential Center on June 18, 2026.

=== Collaborations ===
President Obama with former presidents Clinton and Bush present the Clinton Bush Haiti Fund after the 2010 earthquake.

In January 2010, at President Obama's request, Bush and Bill Clinton established the Clinton Bush Haiti Fund to raise contributions for relief and recovery efforts after the 2010 Haiti earthquake earlier that month. On May 2, 2011, President Obama called Bush, who was at a restaurant with his wife, to inform him that Osama bin Laden had been killed. The Bushes joined the Obamas in New York City to mark the tenth anniversary of the September 11, 2001, terrorist attacks. At the Ground Zero memorial, Bush read a letter that President Abraham Lincoln wrote to a widow who had lost five sons during the Civil War.

On September 7, 2017, Bush partnered with former presidents Jimmy Carter, George H. W. Bush, Bill Clinton, and Barack Obama to work with One America Appeal to help the victims of Hurricane Harvey and Hurricane Irma in the Gulf Coast and Texas communities. Over the years, President Bush has had a good-natured friendship with Michelle Obama. "President Bush and I, we are forever seatmates because of protocol, and that's how we sit at all the official functions," Obama told the Today Show. "He's my partner in crime at every major thing where all the 'formers' gather. So we're together all the time." Bush famously passed mints to Obama during the McCain funeral in September 2018 and gave them to her again during the funeral of his father in December 2018.

=== Art ===
After serving as president, Bush began painting as a hobby after reading Winston Churchill's essay "Painting as a Pastime". Subjects have included people, dogs, and still life. He has also painted self-portraits and portraits of world leaders, including Vladimir Putin and Tony Blair. In February 2017, Bush released a book of portraits of veterans, Portraits of Courage. The net proceeds from his book are donated to the George W. Bush Presidential Center. In May 2019, on the tenth anniversary of former South Korean president Roh Moo-hyun's death, George Bush drew a portrait of Roh to give to his family.

== Cultural and political image ==
=== Image ===
Bush's upbringing in West Texas, his accent, his vacations to his Texas ranch, and his penchant for country metaphors contribute to his folksy, American cowboy image. "I think people look at him and think John Wayne", said Piers Morgan, editor of the British Daily Mirror.

Bush has been parodied by the media, comedians, and other politicians. Detractors tended to cite linguistic errors made by Bush during his public speeches, which are colloquially referred to as Bushisms.

In contrast to his father, who was perceived as having trouble with an overarching unifying theme, Bush embraced larger visions and was seen as a man of larger ideas who took significant risks.

Tony Blair wrote in 2010 that the caricature of Bush as being dumb is "ludicrous" and that Bush is "very smart". In an interview with Playboy, The New York Times columnist David Brooks said Bush "was 60 IQ points smarter in private than he was in public. He doesn't want anybody to think he's smarter than they are, so he puts on a Texas act."

=== Job approval ===
Gallup/USA Today Bush public opinion polling from February 2001 to January 2009: Approve Disapprove Unsure

Bush began his presidency with approval ratings near 60 percent. After the September 11 attacks, Bush gained an approval rating of 90 percent, maintaining 80–90 percent approval for four months after the attacks. It remained over 50 percent during most of his first term and then fell to as low as 19 percent in his second term.

In 2000 and again in 2004, Time magazine named George W. Bush as its Person of the Year, a title awarded to someone who the editors believe "has done the most to influence the events of the year". In May 2004, Gallup reported that 89 percent of the Republican electorate approved of Bush. However, the support waned due mostly to a minority of Republicans' frustration with him on issues of spending, illegal immigration, and Middle Eastern affairs.

Within the United States armed forces, according to an unscientific survey, the president was strongly supported in the 2004 presidential elections. While 73 percent of military personnel said they would vote for Bush, 18 percent preferred his Democratic rival, John Kerry. According to Peter Feaver, a Duke University political scientist who has studied the political leanings of the U.S. military, members of the armed services supported Bush because they found him more likely than Kerry to complete the War in Iraq.

Bush's approval rating surged to 74 percent at the beginning of the Iraq War, up 19 points from his pre-war rating of 55 percent. Bush's approval rating went below the 50 percent mark in AP-Ipsos polling in December 2004. Thereafter, his approval ratings and approval of his handling of domestic and foreign policy issues steadily dropped. After his re-election in 2004, Bush received increasingly heated criticism from across the political spectrum for his handling of the Iraq War, his response to Hurricane Katrina, and to the Abu Ghraib prisoner abuse, NSA warrantless surveillance, the Plame affair, and Guantanamo Bay detention camp controversies.

Amid this criticism, the Democratic Party regained control of Congress in the 2006 midterm elections. Polls conducted in 2006 showed an average approval rating of 37 percent for Bush, the lowest for any second-term president at that point in his term since Harry S. Truman in March 1951 (when Truman's approval rating was 28 percent), which contributed to what Bush called the "thumping" of the Republican Party in the 2006 elections. Throughout most of 2007, Bush's approval rating hovered in the mid-thirties; the average for his entire second term was 37 percent, according to Gallup.

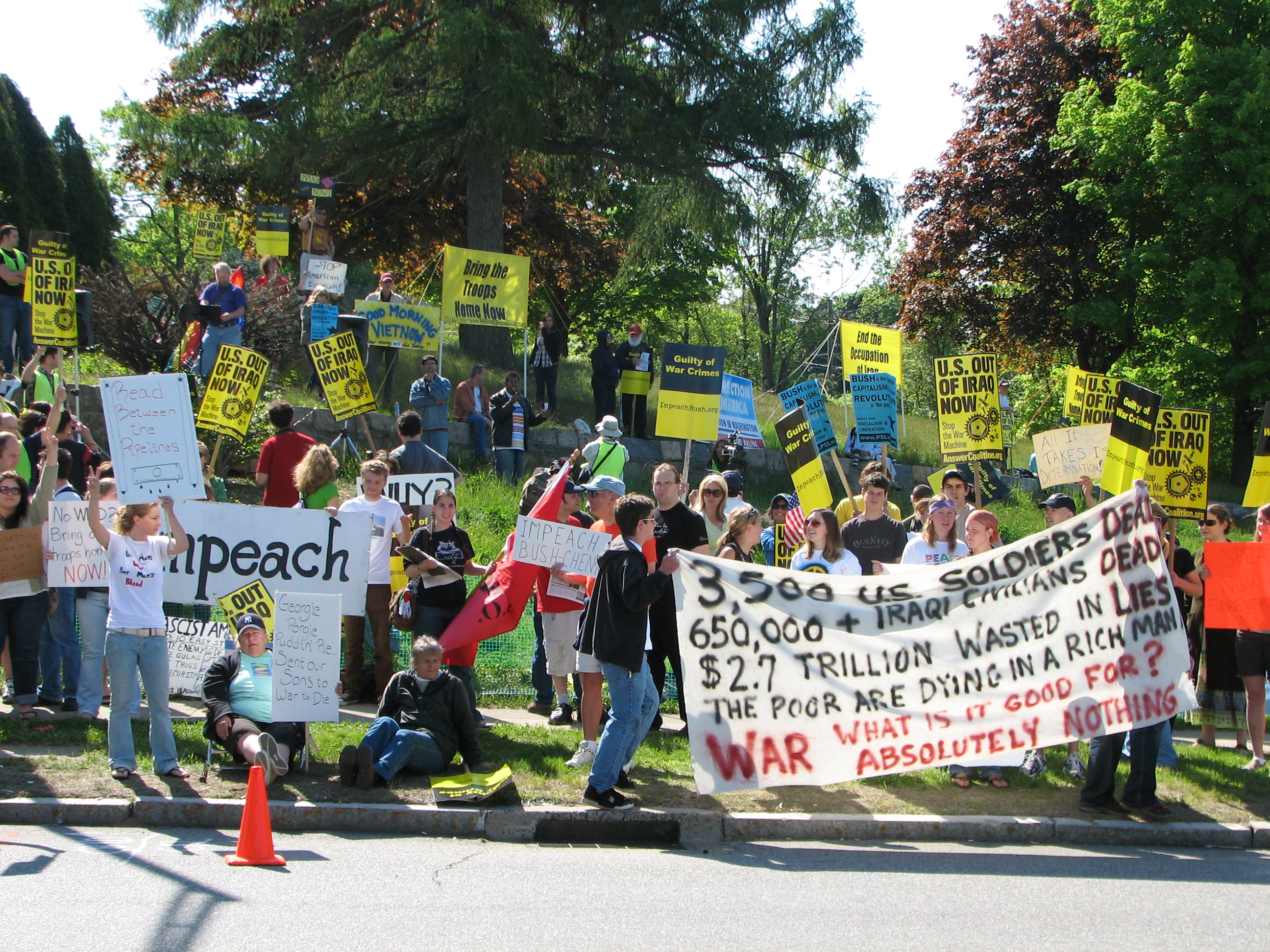
Protest against the Iraq War in New London, Connecticut on May 23, 2007

By the beginning of 2008, his final year in office, Bush's approval rating had dropped to a low of just 19 percent, largely from the loss of support among Republicans. Commenting on his low poll numbers and accusations of being "the worst president", Bush would say, "I make decisions on what I think is right for the United States based upon principles. I frankly don't give a damn about the polls."

There were calls for Bush's impeachment, though most polls showed a plurality of Americans would not support such an action. The arguments offered for impeachment usually centered on the NSA warrantless surveillance controversy, the Bush administration's justification for the war in Iraq, and alleged violations of the Geneva Conventions. Representative Dennis Kucinich (D-OH), who had run against Bush during the 2004 presidential campaign, introduced 35 articles of impeachment on the floor of the House of Representatives against Bush on June 9, 2008, but Speaker Nancy Pelosi (D-CA) declared that impeachment was "off the table".

In April 2008, Bush's disapproval ratings reached the highest ever recorded for any president in the 70-year history of the Gallup poll, with 69 percent of those polled disapproving of the job Bush was doing as president and 28 percent approving – although the majority (66 percent) of Republicans still approved of his job performance.

In polls conducted in the fall, just before the 2008 election, his approval ratings remained at record lows of 19 to 20 percent, while his disapproval ratings ranged from 67 percent to as high as 75 percent. In polling conducted January 9–11, 2009, his final job approval rating by Gallup was 34 percent, which placed him on par with Jimmy Carter and Harry S. Truman, the other presidents whose final Gallup ratings measured in the low 30s (Richard Nixon's final Gallup approval rating was even lower, at 24 percent). According to a CBS News/New York Times poll conducted January 11–15, 2009, Bush's final approval rating in office was 22 percent, the lowest in American history.

=== Foreign perceptions ===
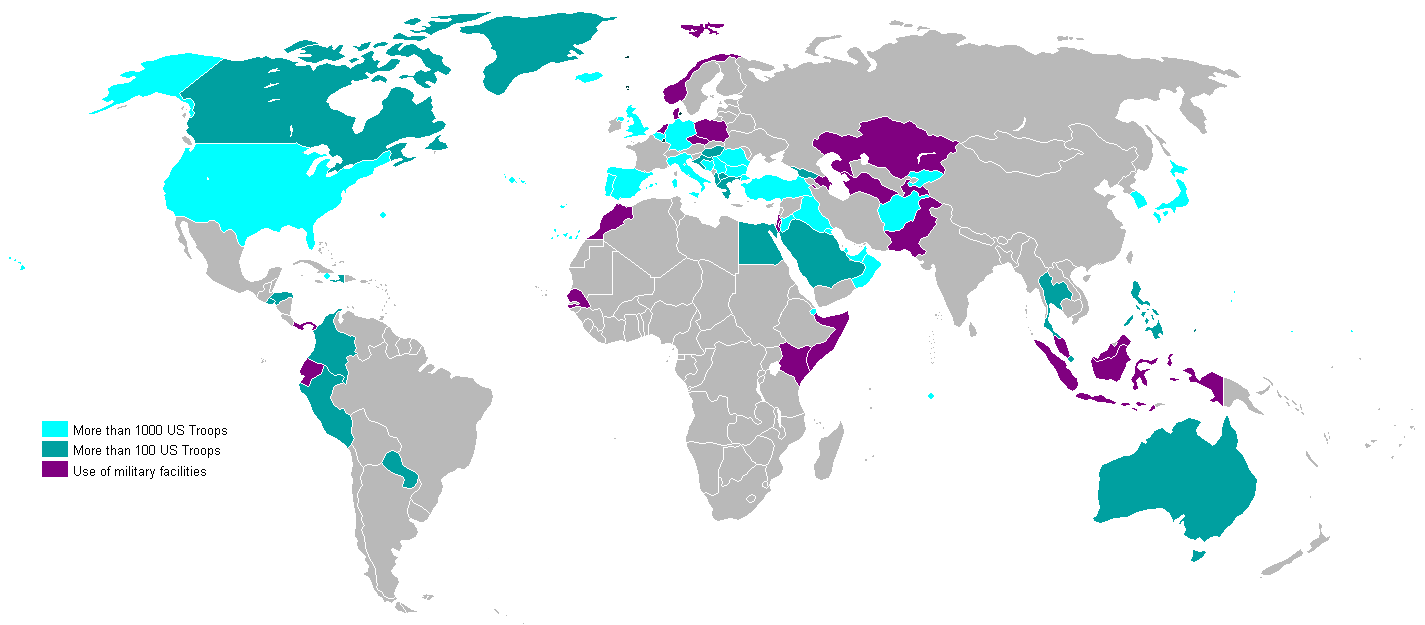
Countries with a U.S. military presence in 2007

Bush was criticized internationally and targeted by the global anti-war and anti-globalization movements for his administration's foreign policy. Views of him within the international community – even in France, a close ally of the United States – were more negative than those of most previous American presidents.

Bush was described as having especially close personal relationships with Tony Blair of the United Kingdom and Vicente Fox of Mexico, although formal relations were sometimes strained. Other leaders, such as Hamid Karzai of Afghanistan, Yoweri Museveni of Uganda, José Luis Rodríguez Zapatero of Spain, and Hugo Chávez of Venezuela, openly criticized the president. Later in Bush's presidency, tensions arose between him and Vladimir Putin, which led to a cooling of their relationship.

In 2006, most respondents in 18 of 21 countries surveyed around the world were found to hold an unfavorable opinion of Bush. Respondents indicated that they judged his administration as negative for world security. In 2007, the Pew Global Attitudes Project reported that during the Bush presidency, attitudes towards the United States, and towards Americans, became less favorable around the world. The Pew Research Center's 2007 Global Attitudes poll found that in only nine countries of 47 did most respondents express "a lot of confidence" or "some confidence" in Bush: Ethiopia, Ghana, India, Israel, Ivory Coast, Kenya, Mali, Nigeria, and Uganda. A March 2007 survey of public opinion in six Arab nations conducted by Zogby International and the University of Maryland found that Bush was the most disliked world leader.

During a June 2007 visit to the predominantly Muslim Albania, Bush was greeted enthusiastically. Albania has a population of 2.8 million, has troops in both Iraq and Afghanistan, and the country's government is highly supportive of American foreign policy. A huge image of the President was hung in the middle of the capital city of Tirana flanked by Albanian and American flags while a local street was named after him. A shirt-sleeved statue of Bush was unveiled in Fushë-Krujë, a few kilometers northwest of Tirana. The Bush administration's support for the unilateral declaration of independence of Albanian-majority Kosovo, while endearing him to the Albanians, troubled U.S. relations with Serbia, leading to the February 2008 torching of the U.S. embassy in Belgrade.

== Legacy ==
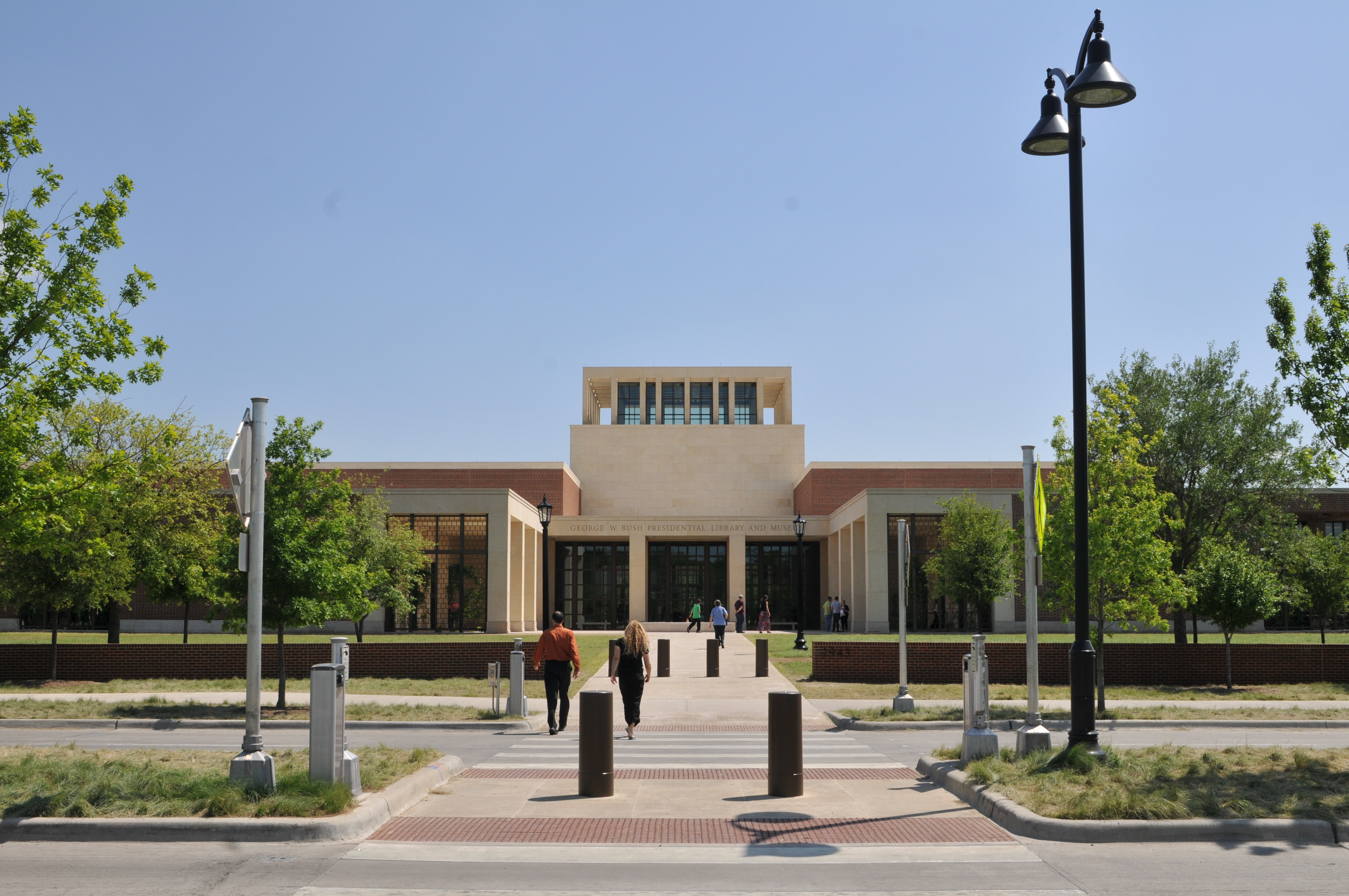
George W. Bush Presidential Center, on the campus of Southern Methodist University

Bush's legacy continues to develop, as time allows the development of a more nuanced historical perspective. Supporters credit his counterterrorism policies with preventing another major terrorist attack in the U.S. after September 11 and praise policies such as the Medicare prescription drug benefit and the AIDS relief program known as PEPFAR. Critics point to his handling of the Iraq War, specifically the failure to find weapons of mass destruction after claiming they were in Iraq, as well as Bush's handling of tax policy, Hurricane Katrina, climate change and the 2008 financial crisis, as proof he was unfit to be president. Ben Ferencz, chief prosecutor for the US Army at the Nuremberg Trials, stated that Bush likely committed war crimes in relation to the Iraq War.

Several historians and commentators hold that Bush was one of the most consequential presidents in American history. Julian Zelizer described Bush's presidency as a "transformative" one, and said that "some people hate him, some people love him, but I do think he'll have a much more substantive perception as time goes on". Bryon Williams of The Huffington Post referred to Bush as "the most noteworthy president since FDR" and said the Patriot Act "increased authority of the executive branch at the expense of judicial opinions about when searches and seizures are reasonable" as evidence. Bush's administration presided over the largest tax cuts since the presidency of Ronald Reagan, and his homeland security reforms proved to be the most significant expansion of the federal government since the Great Society.

Some scholars have situated Bush's presidency as the extension of the Reagan era into the 21st century and the consolidation of American neoconservatism. Likewise, scholars have argued that his decisions not only reflected neoconservative thinking but institutionalized it, transforming those ideas into official strategic doctrine and giving neoconservatism unprecedented influence by turning ideas which had previously circulated mainly in think tanks and intellectual circles into official state policy.

Bush has been widely portrayed in film and television, during and after his presidency. He has had various nicknames including "Dubya", "GWB" and "Shrub".

=== Reception ===
The Bush presidency has been ranked as below-average in surveys of presidential scholars published in the late 2000s and 2010s.

A 2010 Siena Research Institute survey of the opinions of historians, political scientists, and presidential scholars ranked him 39th out of 43 presidents. The survey respondents gave Bush low ratings on his handling of the economy, communication, ability to compromise, foreign policy, and intelligence. Bush said in 2013, "Ultimately history will judge the decisions I made, and I won't be around because it will take time for the objective historians to show up. So I am pretty comfortable with it. I did what I did." C-SPAN's 2021 survey of historians ranked Bush as the 29th-best president; Bush had initially been ranked 36th in 2009.

Among the public, his reputation has improved in the U.S. since his presidency ended in 2009. In 2012, Gallup reported that "Americans still rate George W. Bush among the worst presidents, though their views have become more positive in the three years since he left office." A poll conducted in 2013 marked the first time recorded by Gallup that his ratings were more positive than negative, with 49 percent viewing him favorably compared to 46 percent unfavorably. Other pollsters have noted similar trends of slight improvement in Bush's personal favorability since the end of his presidency. In April 2013, Bush's approval rating stood at 47 percent approval and 50 percent disapproval in a poll jointly conducted for The Washington Post and ABC, his highest approval rating since December 2005. Bush had achieved notable gains among seniors, non-college whites, and moderate and conservative Democrats since leaving office, although majorities disapproved of his handling of the economy (53 percent) and the Iraq War (57 percent). His 47 percent approval rating was equal to President Obama's in the same polling period. A CNN poll conducted that same month found that 55 percent of Americans said Bush's presidency had been a failure, with opinions divided along party lines, and 43 percent of independents calling it a success. Bush's public image saw greater improvement in 2017, with a YouGov survey showing a 51 percent of favorability among Democrats. A 2018 CNN poll subsequently found that 61 percent of respondents held a favorable view of Bush, an increase of nine points from 2015. The improvement has been interpreted as Democrats viewing him more favorably in response to Donald Trump's first presidency, an assessment that has also been expressed by Bush himself.

=== Honors and awards ===
A street in Tirana, Albania, located directly outside the Albanian Parliament and formerly known as Rruga Punëtorët e Rilindjes, was renamed after Bush a few days before he made the first-ever visit by an American president to Albania in June 2007. In 2012, Estonian president Toomas Hendrik Ilves awarded Bush the Order of the Cross of Terra Mariana for his work in expanding NATO. Two elementary schools are named after him: one in Stockton Unified School District in Stockton, California, and one in Wylie Independent School District in St. Paul, Texas, in the Dallas-Fort Worth area.

== Personal life ==
=== Family ===
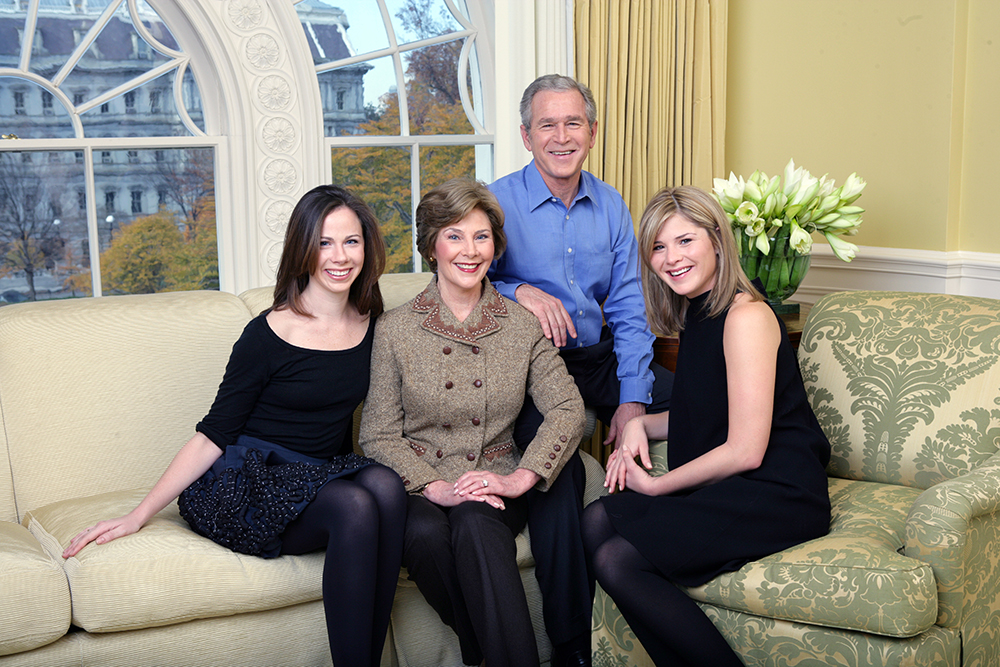
Bush with his family in the White House in 2007

Bush was engaged to Cathryn Lee Wolfman in 1967, but the engagement did not last. Bush and Wolfman remained on good terms after the end of the relationship. While Bush was at a backyard barbecue in 1977, friends introduced him to Laura Welch, a schoolteacher and librarian. After a three-month courtship, she accepted his marriage proposal and they wed on November 5 of that year. The couple settled in Midland, Texas. Bush left his family's Episcopal Church to join his wife's United Methodist Church. On November 25, 1981, Laura Bush gave birth to fraternal twin daughters, Barbara and Jenna. Bush describes being challenged by Billy Graham to consider faith in Jesus "Christ as the risen Lord", how he began reading the Bible daily, "surrendering" to "the Almighty", that "faith is a walk" and that he was "moved by God's love".

=== Alcohol abuse ===
Before his marriage, Bush repeatedly abused alcohol. On September 4, 1976, he was pulled over near his family's summer home in Kennebunkport, Maine, for driving under the influence of alcohol. He was arrested for DUI, was fined $150, and received a brief suspension of his Maine driver's license. Bush said that his wife has had a stabilizing effect on his life, and he attributes his decision to give up alcohol in 1986 to her influence. While governor of Texas, Bush said of his wife, "I saw an elegant, beautiful woman who turned out not only to be elegant and beautiful, but very smart and willing to put up with my rough edges, and I must confess has smoothed them off over time." Bush also says that his faith in God was critical in abstaining: "I believe that God helped open my eyes, which were closing because of booze".

=== Hobbies ===
Bush has been an avid reader throughout his adult life, preferring biographies and histories. During his presidency, Bush read the Bible daily, though at the end of his second term he said on television that he is "not a literalist" about Bible interpretation. Walt Harrington, a journalist, recalled seeing "books by John Fowles, F. Scott Fitzgerald, James Joyce, and Gore Vidal lying about, as well as biographies of Willa Cather and Queen Victoria" in his home when Bush was a Texas oilman. Other activities include cigar smoking and golf. Bush has also painted many paintings. One of his best-known projects is a collection of 43 paintings of immigrants, titled Out of Many, One. Another painting project was Portraits of Courage: A Commander in Chief's Tribute to America's Warrior.

== See also ==
- Electoral history of George W. Bush

Party political offices
Preceded by Clayton Williams	Republican nominee for Governor of Texas; 1994, 1998	Succeeded by Rick Perry
Preceded by Bob Dole	Republican nominee for President of the United States; 2000, 2004	Succeeded by John McCain
Political offices
Preceded by Ann Richards	Governor of Texas; 1995–2000	Succeeded by Rick Perry
Preceded by Bill Clinton	President of the United States; 2001–2009	Succeeded by Barack Obama
U.S. order of precedence (ceremonial)
Preceded by Bill Clinton as Former President	Order of precedence of the United States as Former President	Succeeded by Barack Obama as Former President
Diplomatic posts
New title	Chair of the Group of 20; 2008	Succeeded by Gordon Brown
