= Mike Sager =

American author and journalist (born 1956)

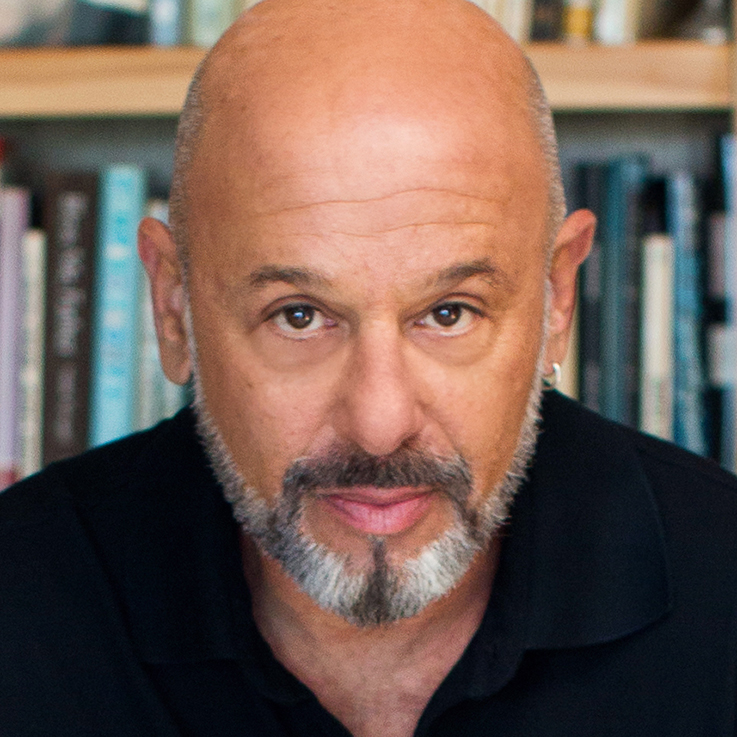
- Born: August 17, 1956 (age 70); Charlottesville, Virginia, U.S.
- Occupations: Journalist; author; publisher; film producer; educator
- Writing career
- Language: English
- Genres: Long-form journalism, fiction, biography
- Website: mikesager.com

Mike Sager (born August 17, 1956) is an American author, journalist, publisher, and educator.

A former Washington Post staff writer, Rolling Stone contributing editor, and writer at large for GQ, Sager has been a contributing writer for Esquire for more than four decades. In 2010 he received the American Society of Magazine Editors' National Magazine award for profile writing for his story "The Man Who Never Was," which appeared in Esquire. He is the author of more than a dozen books, and has served as an editor on several journalism text books. Sager has read and lectured at American schools of journalism. In 2012 he founded The Sager Group LLC, a content brand with a variety of functions ranging from publishing to film making, to general marketing.

== Early life and education ==
Sager was born in Charlottesville, Virginia, to Beverly Rosenberg and Marvin Miles Sager—from, respectively, Culpeper and Fredericksburg, Virginia. The family, along with younger sister Wendy, eventually settled in Baltimore, Maryland. Sager graduated from Pikesville High School in 1974. At Emory University he played varsity soccer; served as president of his fraternity, Tau Epsilon Phi, was selected to Phi Beta Kappa, and was an editor of several school publications, including the college's literary magazine and weekly newspaper The Emory Wheel. where he worked for Henry Schuster, who went on to become a producer at CNN and CBS 60 Minutes

During his senior year at Emory, Sager studied creative writing with the author and jazz historian Albert Murray, who introduced him to rhythm and music in the context of prose. That year he also interned at the alternative weekly Creative Loafing. He received his BA in history in June 1978.

That same year, Sager moved to Washington, D.C. to attend the Georgetown University Law Center. He dropped out after three weeks to pursue a career in writing.

== Newspapers ==
Sager applied to join The Washington Post shortly after graduating. Sager worked as a copy boy on the graveyard shift. Eleven months later, working in his off-hours as a freelancer, Sager broke an investigative story about abuses at the U.S. Department of Agriculture leading to his first front-page story for the paper. This led to Sager being promoted to staff writer by then-Metro Section editor Bob Woodward.

Over the next five years, under publisher Donald E. Graham, Sager moved from night police beat, to cops and courts, to night rewrite, to general assignment, most of that time under city editor Herb Denton. Sager was later assigned to work with editor Walt Harrington. In time, Sager became a roving feature writer, charged with covering rural Virginia.

== International journalism ==
In the fall of 1983, Sager took a leave of absence from the Washington Post to travel the Asian Continent doing freelance journalism. For one story, Sager spent six weeks in Nepal with a group of doctors and medical students; they trekked to a region that had been settled by Tibetan Buddhist refugees and set up a medical clinic. While in Kathmandu, Sager interviewed Birendra Bir Bikram Shah Dev, the King of Nepal, who would later die in a massacre with most of his family. Also on that trip, Sager would research his first piece for Rolling Stone, in Thailand, about expat Vietnam veterans. Upon his return, in early 1984, Sager left the Washington Post to pursue a career in magazines.

== Magazines and film ==
Sager next wrote for Washingtonian and Regardie's magazines in Washington. While at Regardie's he wrote a monthly reported column called "Washington Beat." In 1987 Sager became a contributing editor of Rolling Stone magazine. In 1993 Sager began authoring a regular column for Rolling Stone called "Living in the USA." In late 1993 Sager became a writer-at-large for GQ. He published his first piece in Esquire in 1991 and became a writer-at-large in 1997. He has also written for Vibe, Spy, Interview, The California Sunday Magazine, Smithsonian, and Playboy.

Many of Sager's articles have been optioned for or have inspired films, including Boogie Nights, Wonderland, and Betrayed by Love. In 2012, The Marinovich Project, a documentary based on Sager's Esquire article and featuring Sager as a narrator, aired on ESPN.

== Journalism style ==
Over the years, Sager has practiced a style of journalism that takes cues from anthropological study of subcultures. For his stories, he has embedded with a crack gang in Los Angeles; a 625-pound man in El Monte, California; teenage pit bull fighters in the Philadelphia barrio; Palestinians in the Gaza Strip; heroin addicts on the Lower East Side; Aryan Nations troopers in Idaho; U.S. Marines at Camp Pendleton; Tupperware saleswomen in suburban Maryland; high school boys in Orange County.

After moving to California in the late 1990s, Sager started writing celebrity profiles. Sager has written profiles on celebrities including Jack Nicholson, Robert De Niro, Brad Pitt, Angelina Jolie, Kirk Douglas, Julia Child, Ray Charles, Faye Dunaway, Evel Knievel, Roseanne Barr, Alan Arkin, and Rod Steiger. He has been credited with being the pioneer of Esquire's well known feature, "What I've Learned."

== Academia and The Sager Group ==
Sager has read and lectured at many American schools of journalism, including Columbia University, New York University, Northwestern University, the University of Missouri, Marquette University, and in other forums, ranging from the Monarch School for Homeless Children to Yale Law School. For four years Sager led a writing workshop at the University of California, Irvine, where he was a Pereira Visiting Writer. Currently he is a faculty mentor with Goucher College's MFA/Creative Nonfiction program. He lives in San Diego, California.

In 2011 Sager founded The Sager Group to publish independent books. The Sager Group has since has published many works including Next Wave: America's New Generation of Literary Journalists and The Stories We Tell: Classic Tales by America's Greatest Woman Journalists which was recognized by Constance Hale as one of the best books on narrative journalism. In 2018, The Sager Group expanded into multimedia content including documentary, feature and web-based films.

== Awards and honors ==
Year	Award	Work	Result	Ref.
1996	ASCAP Deems-Taylor Award	Requiem for a Gangsta	Won	
2004	LA Times Bestseller (Nonfiction)	Scary Monsters and Super Freaks	7th	
2007	LA Times Bestseller (Nonfiction)	Revenge of the Donut Boys	6th	
2008	Military Writers Society of Americas: Founder's Award	Wounded Warriors	Won	
2008	American Author's Association: Golden Quill Award	Wounded Warriors	Won	
2010	New York Times Best Seller	Tattoos & Tequila: To Hell and Back with One of Rock's Most Notorious Frontmen	29th	
2010	ASME National Magazine Award	The Man Who Never Was	Won	

== Bibliography ==
- Scary Monsters and Super Freaks: Stories of Sex, Drugs, Rock ’n’ Roll, and Murder, (New York: Thunder's Mouth Press, 2004, ISBN 1-56025-563-3)
- Revenge of the Donut Boys: True Stories of Lust, Fame, Survival and Multiple Personality, (New York: Thunder's Mouth Press, 2007, ISBN 1-56858-350-8)
- Revenge of the Donut Boys, Second Edition: True Stories of Lust, Fame, Survival and Multiple Personality, (San Diego, CA: The Sager Group LLC, 2018, ISBN 978-0-9980793-8-7)
- Deviant Behavior: A Novel, (New York: Grove/Atlantic/Black Cat, 2008, ISBN 0-8021-7048-X)
- Wounded Warriors: Those for Whom the War Never Ends, (Cambridge, MA: Da Capo Press, 2008, ISBN 978-0-306-81735-9)
- Tattoos & Tequila: To Hell and Back with One of Rock's Most Notorious Frontmen, with Vince Neil (New York: Grand Central Publishing, 2010, ISBN 978-0-446-54804-5)
- The Someone You're Not: True Stories of Sports, Celebrity, Politics & Pornography, (San Diego, CA: The Sager Group,2012, ISBN 978-0-9881785-0-2)
- Next Wave: America's New Generation of Great Literary Journalists, edited by Walt Harrington and Mike Sager, (San Diego, CA: The Sager Group,2012, ISBN 978-0-9881785-1-9)
- High Tolerance: A Novel of Sex, Race, Celebrity, Murder . . . and Marijuana, (San Diego, CA: The Sager Group, 2013, ISBN 978-0-9881785-6-4)
- "The United States Marines". What I've Learned. Warriors. Esquire. 159 (1): 80. January 2013.
- The Devil and John Holmes-25th Anniversary Author's Edition: And Other True Stories of Drugs, Porn and Murder, (San Diego, CA: The Sager Group, 2014, ISBN 978-0-9862679-0-1)
- Stoned Again: The High Times and Strange Life of a Drugs Correspondent, (New York: Byliner Selects, 2015, ISBN 978-1-5080128-1-8)
- The Lonely Hedonist: True Stories of Sex, Drugs, Dinosaurs and Peter Dinklage, (San Diego, CA: The Sager Group, 2017,ISBN 978-0-9980793-5-6)
- VetVille: True Stories of the US Marines, (San Diego, CA: The Sager Group, 2019,ISBN 978-1-950154-07-4)
- Janet’s World: The Inside Story of Washington Post Pulitzer Fabulist Janet Cooke
- Shaman: The Mysterious Life and Impeccable Death of Carlos Castaneda,(San Diego, CA: The Sager Group, 2020,ISBN 978-1-950154-19-7)
- A Boy and His Dog in Hell: And Other True Stories ,(San Diego, CA: The Sager Group, 2021,ISBN 978-1-9501542-7-2)
- Hunting Marlon Brando: A True Story,(San Diego, CA: The Sager Group, 2021,ISBN 978-1-950154-11-1)
- The Rise and Fall of a Super Freak: And Other True Stories of Black Men Who Made History,(San Diego, CA: The Sager Group, 2021,ISBN 978-1-9501544-0-1)
- The Pope of Pot: And Other True Stories of Marijuana and Related High Jinks,(San Diego, CA: The Sager Group, 2022,ISBN 978-1-9501547-9-1)
