= United States presidential vacations =

U.S. presidential vacations, or vacations taken by the presidents of the United States, have often been politically contentious.

== History ==
Since the time of Ulysses S. Grant in 1874, Martha's Vineyard has been a popular vacation site for presidents. Presidents who have taken a vacation there include John F. Kennedy, Bill Clinton, and Barack Obama.

The presidential vacations can be risky in terms of popularity and practical safety:

- John Adams was criticized for spending time caring for his ailing wife.
- The longest vacation by any United States president was James Madison. Madison was at the end of his presidency, when he took a four-month vacation from sometime during June 1816 until sometime during October 1816.
- James Garfield was shot while leaving Washington for his vacation.
- Theodore Roosevelt was criticized for leaving Washington for months at a time.
- Franklin Roosevelt was criticized for spending time on his yacht.
- George W. Bush was often criticized by Democrats for taking long vacations to his ranch in Crawford, Texas, during the Iraq war.
- Barack Obama's vacations have been scrutinized by the media. During the 2007–2012 recession he was criticized for vacationing at Martha's Vineyard.
- President Donald Trump: In May 2019 Trump was criticized for various expenses; such as, golf trips having cost taxpayers at least $102 million in extra travel and security expenses, trips to Florida having cost $81 million, his trips to New Jersey costing $17 million, his 2018 two days in Scotland costing at least $3 million, and $1 million for a trip to his resort in Los Angeles. During most of his presidency, he used the concept of "working-vacations" to justify most of his trips, especially after making remarks such as "I would not be a president who took vacations. I would not be a president that takes time off."

== Known totals ==
President	Term	Days	Total costs	Average days/yr
Donald Trump (second term)	2025–present	-	-	-
Joe Biden	2021–2025	183–184 (532) (Note: The Republican National Committee claims 532 days, as of September 2024, but the primary source in media coverage is an RNC post on X. The Washington Post's assessment varies by RNC estimates by 126 days fewer as of May 22, 2023. A detailed analysis published by Snopes calculated a total of 183–184 Biden vacation days.)	-	46 (131)
Donald Trump (first term)	2017–2021	378 (0) (Note: Donald Trump claims he will not take vacation days, as any days he took would be "working vacation" days.)	$144m	95 (0)
Barack Obama	2009–2017	328	$105m	41
George W. Bush	2001–2009	1,020	$140m	128
Bill Clinton	1993–2001	174 – 345	$128m	22–43
George H. W. Bush	1989–1993	543	-	136
Ronald Reagan	1981–1989	335 – 866	-	42–108
Jimmy Carter	1977–1981	79	-	20
Gerald Ford	1974–1977	-	-	-
Richard Nixon	1969–1974	-	-	-
Lyndon B. Johnson	1963–1969	484	-	81
John F. Kennedy	1961–1963	-	-	-
Dwight D. Eisenhower	1953–1961	456	-	57
Harry S. Truman	1945–1953	175	-	22
Franklin D. Roosevelt	1933–1945	958	-	80
Herbert Hoover	1929–1933	49	-	12
