= List of awards and honors received by George W. Bush =

George W. Bush, the 43rd president of the United States, has received numerous honors in recognition of his career in politics. These include:

== National honors ==
Country	Date	Decoration
United States of America	6 January 2009	Department of Defense Medal for Distinguished Public Service

== Foreign honors ==
Country	Date	Decoration
Estonia	1 February 2002	Order of the Cross of Terra Mariana (1st Class)
Lithuania	23 November 2002	Order of Vytautas the Great (Grand Cross)
Romania	23 November 2002	Order of the Star of Romania
Philippines	18 October 2003	Order of Sikatuna (Grand Collar)
Latvia	7 May 2005	Order of the Three Stars (Commander Grand Cross with Chain)
Georgia	10 May 2005	St. George's Order of Victory
Albania	10 June 2007	National Flag Decoration
United Arab Emirates	13 January 2008	Order of Zayed (Collar)
Saudi Arabia	14 January 2008	Order of King Abdulaziz (Collar)
Benin	16 February 2008	National Order of Benin (Grand Cross)
Liberia	21 February 2008	Order of the Pioneers of Liberia (Grand Cordon)
Afghanistan	15 December 2008	Amir Amanullah Khan Award
Macedonia	26 September 2015	Order of the Republic of Macedonia
Croatia	31 July 2017	Grand Order of King Tomislav
Kosovo	30 November 2018	Order of Independence

== Scholastic ==
Honorary degrees

Location	Date	School	Degree	Gave Commencement Address
Texas	16 May 1998	Baylor University	Doctor of Laws (LL.D)	Yes
Connecticut	2001	Central Connecticut State University	Doctor of Laws (LL.D)	
Indiana	20 May 2001	University of Notre Dame	Doctor of Laws (LL.D)	Yes
Connecticut	2001	Yale University	Doctor of Laws (LL.D)	
Ohio	14 June 2002	Ohio State University	Doctor of Public Administration (DPS)	
South Carolina	2003	University of South Carolina	Doctor of Laws (LL.D)	
Wisconsin	2004	Concordia University Wisconsin	Doctor of Laws (LL.D)	
Louisiana	22 May 2004	Louisiana State University	Doctor of Science (D.Sc)	Yes
Oklahoma	7 May 2006	Oklahoma State University	Doctor of Laws (LL.D)	Yes
New York	15 December 2014	Yeshiva University	Doctor of Humane Letters (DHL)	Yes
Texas	11 February 2015	University of Mary Hardin–Baylor	Doctor of Humane Letters (DHL)	Yes

== Awards ==
Location	Date	Institution	Award
New York	2000	TIME magazine	Time Person of the Year
New York	2004	TIME magazine	Time Person of the Year
Pennsylvania	11 November 2018	National Constitution Center	Liberty Medal: Awarded with Laura Bush
Illinois	2019	Abraham Lincoln Presidential Library Foundation	Lincoln Leadership Prize

== Freedom of the City ==
- (Lithuania) 30 August 2018: Vilnius.

== Namesakes ==
- George W. Bush Elementary School, Stockton, California
- George W. Bush Elementary School, St. Paul, Texas
- George W. Bush Street, Tbilisi, Georgia
