= Jesus Day =

Holiday in the United States

Jesus Day is the day of the March for Jesus held annually since the 1980s by some Christians in the United States on the Saturday before Pentecost Sunday. The main purpose is to demonstrate public respect for Jesus Christ, the central figure of the Christian faith, by uniting with local communities in worship.

Then-Texas Governor George W. Bush signed a bill into law proclaiming June 10, 2000 to be Jesus Day. The event was observed in Austin that year. The Texas proclamation urged people to "follow the example of Jesus" to "answer the call to serve those in need". The proclamation received national attention when the New York Times ran an article on it. The New York Times said that Jesus Day was unconstitutional because it violated the religious freedom clause of the First Amendment to the United States Constitution.

Furthermore, on the necessity of observing a Jesus Day, Matthew Dennis from History News Network stated that such event would be redundant, since "for Christians, Jesus already has his day, celebrated not only Sunday, but on Christmas and Easter as well, in feasts marking the Christian savior’s birth, death, and resurrection", remarking that "it’s odd that Governor Bush would invent a new red-letter day when similar ones already existed".
