= Walt Harrington =

American author and journalist

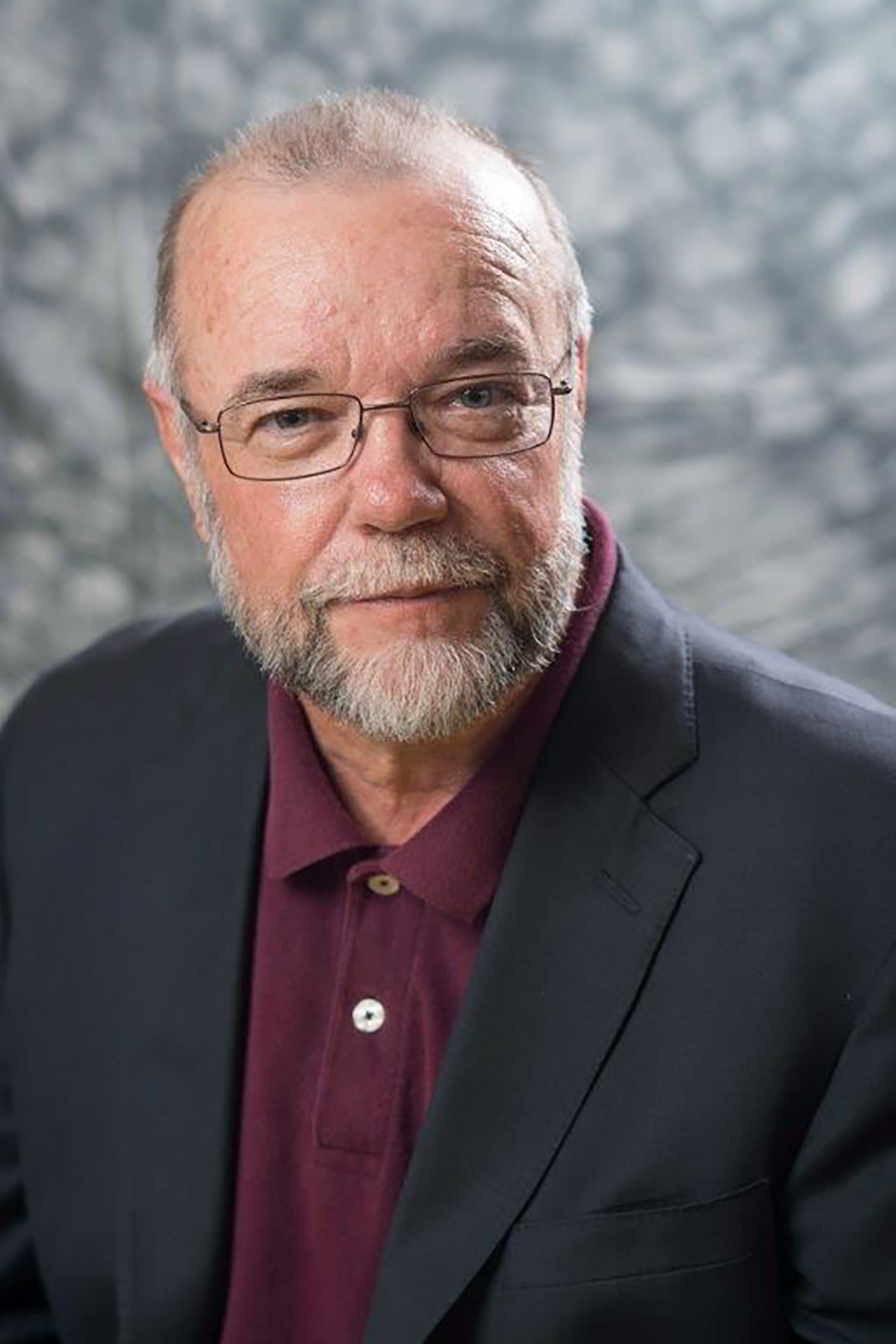
- Born: September 2, 1950 (age 75) Will County, Illinois, United States
- Occupation: Journalist; author; educator
- Language: English
- Genre: Long-form journalism, Biography

Walt Harrington (born September 2, 1950) is an American Journalist, author, and educator. Harrington is a former staff writer for the Washington Post Magazine, where he wrote benchmark profiles for Jesse Jackson, Jerry Falwell, Bryan Stevenson, Rosa Parks and George H. W. Bush, as well as numerous in-depth stories on the lives of ordinary people. He graduated from Blackburn College with a B.A., and the University of Missouri with Masters degrees in Journalism and Sociology. Harrington has been the author or editor of eleven books. His book The Everlasting Stream: A True Story of Rabbits, Guns, Friendship, and Family was adapted into an Emmy-winning PBS Documentary. In 2016 Harrington became a professor emeritus at the University of Illinois, where for 20 years he taught literary journalism and served as head of the Department of Journalism and as an associate chancellor. He is the father of two and lives with his wife of many years Keran Elliott Harrington in Illinois.

== Bibliography ==
- American Profiles: Somebodies and Nobodies Who Matter, (Missouri: University of Missouri, 1992, ISBN 978-0-8262083-9-2)
- Crossings: A White Man's Journey into Black America, (New York: HarperCollins, 1993, ISBN 978-0-0601655-8-1)
- Intimate Journalism: The Art and Craft of Reporting Everyday Life, (New York: SAGE Publications, Inc, 1994, ISBN 978-0-7619058-7-5)
- At the Heart of It: Ordinary People, Extraordinary Lives, (Missouri: University of Missouri, 1996, ISBN 978-0-8262107-8-4)
- The Everlasting Stream: A True Story of Rabbits, Guns, Friendship, and Family, (New York: Grove Press, 2004, ISBN 978-0-8021405-0-0)
- The Beholder's Eye: A Collection of America's Finest Personal Journalism, Edited by Walt Harrington (New York: Grove Press, 2005, ISBN 978-0-8021422-4-5)
- Next Wave: America's New Generation of Great Literary Journalists, as Editor (San Diego, CA: CreateSpace,2012, ISBN 978-14811608-9-6)
- Slices of Life, edited by Walt Harrington, (Champaign, Illinois: The News-Gazette, 2013, ISBN 978-09846063-8-2)
- Acts of Creation: America's Finest Hand Craftsmen at Work(San Diego, CA: The Sager Group, 2014, ISBN 978-0-9895241-6-2)
- Artful Journalism: Essays in the Craft and Magic of True Storytelling, (San Diego, CA: The Sager Group, 2015, ISBN 978-0996490115)
- The Detective: And Other True Stories, (San Diego, CA: The Sager Group, NeoText, 2021, ISBN 978-1950154654)
