= Bibliography of George W. Bush =

This bibliography of George W. Bush is a list of published works about George W. Bush, the 43rd president of the United States.

== Books written by Bush ==
- George W. Bush, A Charge to Keep (1999), ISBN 0-688-17441-8
- George W. Bush, We will prevail: President George W. Bush on war, terrorism, and freedom (2003), ISBN 0-8264-1552-0
- George W. Bush, George W. Bush on God and on Country: The President Speaks Out About Faith, Principle, and Patriotism (2004), ISBN 1-59160-918-6
- George W. Bush, Decision Points (2010), ISBN 978-0-307-59061-9
- George W. Bush, 41: A Portrait of My Father (2014), ISBN 9780553447781
- Dietrich, John W. ed. The George W. Bush Foreign Policy Reader: Presidential Speeches with Commentary (Routledge, 2015).
- George W. Bush, Portraits of Courage: A Commander in Chief's Tribute to America's Warriors (2017)
- George W. Bush, Out of Many, One: Portraits of America's Immigrants (2021)

== Books written about Bush ==
- David Aikman, A Man of Faith: The Spiritual Journey of George W. Bush (2004), ISBN 0-8499-1811-1
- Eric Alterman and Mark J. Green, The Book on Bush: How George W. (Mis)leads America (2004), ISBN 0-670-03273-5
- Ken Auletta (January 19, 2004). "Fortress Bush: How the White House Keeps the Press Under Control", The New Yorker, 79#53
- Balmer, Randall. God in the White House: A History – How Faith Shaped the Presidency from John F. Kennedy to George W. Bush (Harper One, 2008).
- Bruce Bartlett, Imposter: How George W. Bush Bankrupted America and Betrayed the Reagan Legacy (2006), ISBN 0-385-51827-7
- Paul Begala, Is Our Children Learning?: The Case Against George W. Bush (2000), ISBN 0-7432-1478-1
- Paul Begala, It's Still the Economy, Stupid: George W. Bush, the GOP's CEO (2002), ISBN 0-7432-4647-0
- Berry, Michael J. "Controversially executing the law: George W. Bush and the constitutional signing statement." Congress & the Presidency 36#3 (2009).
- John Bonifaz, Warrior King: The Case for Impeaching George Bush (2003), ISBN 1-56025-606-0
- Bostdorff, Denise M. "Epideictic rhetoric in the service of war: George W. Bush on Iraq and the 60th anniversary of the victory over Japan." Communication Monographs 78.3 (2011): 296-323. online
- James Bovard, The Bush Betrayal (2004), ISBN 1-4039-6727-X
- Russell S. Bowen, The Immaculate Deception: The Bush Crime Family Exposed (1991), ISBN 0-922356-80-7
- Brands, Hal. What good is grand strategy?: Power and purpose in American statecraft from Harry S. Truman to George W. Bush (Cornell UP, 2014).
- Brands, Hal, and Peter Feaver. "The case for Bush revisionism: Reevaluating the legacy of America’s 43rd president." Journal of Strategic Studies 41.1-2 (2018): 234-274. online
- Bruni, Frank (2002). Ambling Into History: The Unlikely Odyssey of George W. Bush (1st ed.). New York: HarperCollins. ISBN 9780066213712.
- Robert Bryce, Cronies: Oil, The Bushes, and the Rise of Texas, America's Superstate (2004), ISBN 1-58648-188-6
- Vincent Bugliosi, The Prosecution of George W. Bush for Murder (2008), ISBN 978-1-59315-481-3
- Burns, Richard Dean. The Missile Defense Systems of George W. Bush: A Critical Assessment (ABC-CLIO, 2010).
- Butterworth, Michael L. "George W. Bush as the 'Man in the Arena': Baseball, Public Memory, and the Rhetorical Redemption of a President." Rhetoric and Public Affairs 22.1 (2019): 1-32 online.
- Robert C. Byrd, Losing America: Confronting a Reckless and Arrogant Presidency (2004), ISBN 0-393-05942-1
- Richard Clarke, Against All Enemies: Inside America's War on Terror (2004), ISBN 0-7432-6045-7
- Coe, Kevin. "George W. Bush, television news, and rationales for the Iraq War." Journal of Broadcasting & Electronic Media 55.3 (2011): 307-324 online.
- David Corn, The Lies of George W. Bush: Mastering the Politics of Deception (2003), ISBN 1-4000-5066-9
- Daalder, Ivo H., and Irving M. Destler. In the Shadow of the Oval Office: Profiles of the National Security Advisers and the Presidents They Served--From JFK to George W. Bush (Simon and Schuster, 2009).
- Ivo H. Daalder and James M. Lindsay, America Unbound: The Bush Revolution in Foreign Policy (2003), ISBN 0-8157-1688-5
- Daynes, Byron W., and Glen Sussman, eds. White house politics and the environment: Franklin D. Roosevelt to George W. Bush (Texas A&M University Press, 2010).
- John W. Dean, Worse Than Watergate: The Secret Presidency of George W. Bush (2004), ISBN 0-316-00023-X
- Robert S. Devine, Bush Versus the Environment (2004), ISBN 1-4000-7521-1
- Maureen Dowd, Bushworld: Enter at Your Own Risk (2004), ISBN 0-399-15258-X
- Robert Draper, Dead Certain: The Presidency of George W. Bush (2007), ISBN 0-7432-7728-7
- Edwards, Jason A., and Richard Herder. "Melding a new immigration narrative? President George W. Bush and the immigration debate." Howard Journal of Communications 23.1 (2012): 40-65.
- Espinosa, Gastón, ed. Religion and the American Presidency: George Washington to George W. Bush with Commentary and Primary Sources (Columbia UP, 2009).
- Justin A. Frank, Bush on the Couch: Inside the Mind of the President (2004), Regan Books. ISBN 0-06-073670-4
- Ben Fritz, Bryan Keefer & Brendan Nyhan, All the President's Spin: George W. Bush, the Media, and the Truth (2004), ISBN 0-7432-6251-4
- David Frum, The Right Man: An Inside Account of the Bush White House (2003), ISBN 0-375-50903-8 ISBN 0-8129-6695-3
- Galvin, Daniel J. Presidential Party Building: Dwight D. Eisenhower to George W. Bush (Princeton UP, 2009).
- Gordon, Michael R., and Bernard E. Trainor. The endgame: The inside story of the struggle for Iraq, from George W. Bush to Barack Obama (Pantheon, 2012).
- Green, Michael J. By more than providence: Grand strategy and American power in the Asia Pacific since 1783 (Columbia UP, 2017) pp 482–517. online
- John Robert Greene. Presidential Profiles: The George W. Bush Years (New York: Facts on File, 2011), ISBN 978-0-8160-7765-6
- John Robert Greene. The Presidency of George W. Bush (Lawrence: University Press of Kansas, 2021), ISBN 978-0-7006-3268-8
- James Hatfield, Fortunate Son: George W. Bush and the Making of an American President (1999), ISBN 1-887128-84-0
- Jack Huberman, The Bush-Haters Handbook: A Guide to the Most Appalling Presidency of the Past 100 Years (2003), ISBN 1-56025-569-2
- Molly Ivins, Bushwhacked : Life in George W. Bush's America (2003), ISBN 0-375-50752-3
- Molly Ivins and Lou Dubose, Shrub: The Short but Happy Political Life of George W. Bush (2000), ISBN 0-375-50399-4
- Patrick S. Johnston, Mission Accomplished (2006), ISBN 1-59858-244-5
- William Karel, The World According to Bush (2004) documentary
- Kitty Kelley, The Family: The Real Story of the Bush Dynasty (2004), ISBN 0-385-50324-5
- Kellough, J. Edward, Lloyd G. Nigro, and Gene A. Brewer. "Civil service reform under George W. Bush: Ideology, politics, and public personnel administration." Review of Public Personnel Administration 30.4 (2010): 404-422.
- Kengor, Paul. God and George W. Bush: A Spiritual Life (Regan Books, 2004).
- Robert F. Kennedy Jr., Crimes Against Nature: How George W. Bush and His Corporate Pals Are Plundering the Country and Hijacking Our Democracy (2004), ISBN 0-06-074687-4
- Ronald Kessler, A Matter Of Character: Inside The White House Of George W. Bush (2004), ISBN 1-59523-000-9
- Brad Koplowitz, Our Brave New World (2010), ISBN 978-0-557-33697-5
- Kraybill, Jeanine E., And R. A. U. L. Madrid Jr. "The Rhetoric of Crisis: George W. Bush during the Afghanistan and Iraq Wars." American Communication Journal 21.1 (2019) online
- Kuehl, Rebecca A. "The rhetorical presidency and “accountability” in education reform: Comparing the presidential rhetoric of Ronald Reagan and George W. Bush." Southern Communication Journal 77.4 (2012): 329-348.
- Laurent, Éric (2004). Bush's secret world : religion, big business, and hidden networks. Cambridge, UK: Polity. ISBN 9780745633480. "translated by Andrew Brown"
- Leffler, Melvyn P. "The foreign policies of the George W. Bush administration: Memoirs, history, legacy." Diplomatic History 37.2 (2013): 190-216.
- Michael Lind, Made In Texas: George W. Bush and the Southern Takeover of American Politics (2002), ISBN 0-465-04121-3
- Lindsay, James M. "George W. Bush, Barack Obama and the future of US global leadership." International Affairs 87.4 (2011): 765-779 online.
- McAdams, Dan P. (2011). George W. Bush and the Redemptive Dream: A Psychological Portrait. Oxford: Oxford University Press. ISBN 9780199752089.
- McClellan, Scott, What Happened: Inside the Bush White House and Washington's Culture of Deception (2009), ISBN 1-58648-556-3
- Stephen Mansfield, The Faith of George W. Bush (2003), ISBN 1-58542-309-2
- Anthony Marchionda, Jr., George W. Bush UNBOUND (2012), ASIN B0072YTXC8
- Mark Crispin Miller, The Bush Dyslexicon: Observations on a National Disorder (2002), ISBN 0-393-32296-3
- Mark Crispin Miller, Cruel and Unusual: Bush/Cheney's New World Order (2004), ISBN 0-393-05917-0
- Richard Miniter, Shadow War: The Untold Story of How Bush Is Winning the War on Terror (2004), ISBN 0-89526-052-2
- Bill Minutaglio, First Son: George W. Bush and the Bush Family Dynasty (1999), ISBN 0-609-80867-2—this work is the first major biography of Bush
- Elizabeth Mitchell, W: Revenge of the Bush Dynasty (2000), ISBN 0-7868-6630-6
- Alexander Moens, The Foreign Policy of George W. Bush: Values, Strategy And Loyalty (2004), ISBN 0-7546-4274-7
- James C. Moore and Wayne Slater, Bush's Brain: How Karl Rove Made George W. Bush Presidential (2003), ISBN 0-471-47140-2
- Michael Moore, Dude, Where's My Country? (2004), ISBN 0-446-69379-0
- Michael Moore, Stupid White Men (2004), ISBN 0-06-098726-X
- Michael Moore, Fahrenheit 9/11 (2004) motion picture
- Jack Nargundkar, The Bush Diaries: A Citizen's Review of the First Term (2005), ISBN 0-595-35898-5
- Obschonka, Martin, and Christian Fisch. "Entrepreneurial personalities in political leadership." Small Business Economics 50.4 (2018): 851-869.
- Peggy Noonan, We Will Prevail: President George W. Bush on War, Terrorism and Freedom (2004), ISBN 0-8499-1811-1
- Kevin Phillips, American Dynasty: Aristocracy, Fortune, and the Politics of Deceit in the House of Bush (2004), ISBN 0-670-03264-6
- John Podhoretz, Bush Country: How Dubya Became a Great President While Driving Liberals Insane (2004), ISBN 0-312-32472-3
- Carl Pope, Strategic Ignorance : Why the Bush Administration Is Recklessly Destroying a Century of Environmental Progress (2004), ISBN 1-57805-109-6
- B. Wayne Quist and Dr. David F. Drake, Winning the War on Terror: A Triumph of American Values (2005), ISBN 0-595-35776-8
- Gabriel Range, Death of a President (2006) motion picture
- Renshon, Jonathan. “Stability and Change in Belief Systems: The Operational Code of George W. Bush.” Journal of Conflict Resolution 52#6 (2008): 820-849.
- Renshon, Jonathan. “When Public Statements Reveal Private Beliefs: Assessing Operational Codes at a Distance.” Political Psychology 30#4 (2009): 649-661.
- Renshon, Stanley A. In His Father’s Shadow: The Transformations of George W. Bush (Palgrave Macmillan, 2004).
- Renshon, Stanley A. and Jonathan Renshon. “The Theory and Practice of Foreign Policy Decision Making.” Political Psychology 29#4 (2008): 509-532.
- Resh, William G. Rethinking the administrative presidency: Trust, intellectual capital, and appointee-careerist relations in the George W. Bush administration (JHU Press, 2015).
- Rodman, Peter W. Presidential Command: Power, Leadership, and the Making of Foreign Policy from Richard Nixon to George W. Bush (Vintage, 2010).
- Roof, Wade Clark. "American presidential rhetoric from Ronald Reagan to George W. Bush: Another look at civil religion." Social Compass 56.2 (2009): 286-301.
- Saghaye-Biria, Hakime. "Appraising the Foreign Policy Legacy of George W. Bush on Iran: The Roots of the Current Crisis." Journal of Contemporary Research on Islamic Revolution 2.3 (2020): 39-60 online
- Bill Sammon, Fighting Back: The War on Terrorism from Inside the Bush White House (2002), ISBN 0-89526-149-9
- Bill Sammon, Misunderestimated: The President Battles Terrorism, John Kerry, and the Bush Haters (2004), ISBN 0-06-072383-1
- Savage, Charlie (2007). Takeover: The Return of the Imperial Presidency and the Subversion of American Democracy. New York: Little, Brown and Company. ISBN 9780316118040. OCLC 123029209.
- Michael Scheuer (orig. pub. under "Anonymous"), Imperial Hubris: Why the West is Losing the War on Terror (2004), ISBN 1-57488-849-8
- Schier, Steven E. (2009). Panorama of a Presidency: How George W. Bush Acquired and Spent His Political Capital. Armonk, N.Y.: M.E. Sharpe. ISBN 9780765616920.
- Peter Singer, The President of Good and Evil: The Ethics of George W. Bush (2004), ISBN 0-525-94813-9
- Singh, Robert S. "The Trump, Bush, and Obama Doctrines: A Comparative Analysis". In The Trump Doctrine and the Emerging International System (Palgrave Macmillan, Cham, 2021) pp. 319–353.
- Siracusa, Joseph M., and Laurens J. Visser. "George W. Bush, Diplomacy, and Going to War with Iraq, 2001-2003." The Journal of Diplomatic Research/Diplomasi Araştırmaları Dergisi (2019) 1#1: 1-29 online
- Glenn W Smith, Unfit Commander: Texans for Truth Take on George W. Bush (2004), ISBN 0-06-079245-0
- Jean Edward Smith, Bush (2016), the major scholarly biography ISBN 978-1-4767-4121-5
- W. (2008), a biographical film about George W. Bush. It was produced and directed by Oliver Stone.
- Ron Suskind, The Way of the World (2008).
- Jackson Thoreau, Born to Cheat: How Bush, Cheney, Rove & Co. Broke the Rules - From the Sandlot to the White House (2007) ISBN 978-1-881365-53-2
- Craig Unger, House of Bush, House of Saud: The Secret Relationship Between the World's Two Most Powerful Dynasties (2004), ISBN 0-7432-5337-X
- Von Bothmer, Bernard. Framing the Sixties: The Use and Abuse of a Decade from Ronald Reagan to George W. Bush (U of Massachusetts Press, 2010).
- Paul Waldman, Fraud: The Strategy Behind the Bush Lies and Why the Media Didn't Tell You (2004), ISBN 1-4022-0252-0
- Warshaw, Shirley Anne (2010). The Co-Presidency of Bush and Cheney. Stanford Politics and Policy. ISBN 978-0804758185.
- Weisberg, Jacob (2001). George W. Bushisms : the Slate book of the accidental wit and wisdom of our forty-third president. New York: Fireside. ISBN 978-0743222228.
- Weisberg, Jacob (2002). More George W. Bushisms : more of Slate's accidental wit and wisdom of our forty-third president. New York: Fireside. ISBN 978-0743225199.
- Weisberg, Jacob (2003). Still more George W. Bushisms : neither in French, nor in English, nor in Mexican. New York: Simon & Schuster. ISBN 0-7432-5100-8.
- Weisberg, Jacob (2004). The Deluxe Election Edition Bushisms: The First Term, in His Own Special Words. New York: Fireside. ISBN 0-7432-6252-2.
- Weisberg, Jacob (2007). The ultimate George W. Bushisms : Bush at war (with the English language) (1st Fireside trade pbk. ed.). New York: Simon & Schuster. ISBN 9781416550587.
- Weisberg, Jacob (2008). The Bush Tragedy (1st ed.). New York: Random House. ISBN 978-0-8129-7835-3.
- Ian Williams, Deserter: George Bush's War on Military Families, Veterans, and His Past (2004), ISBN 1-56025-627-3
- Clint Willis, The I Hate George W. Bush Reader: Why Dubya Is Wrong About Absolutely Everything (2004), ISBN 1-56025-589-7
- Bob Woodward, State of Denial (2006)
- Bob Woodward, Bush At War (2002), ISBN 0-7432-4461-3
- Bob Woodward, Plan of Attack (2004), ISBN 0-7432-5547-X
- Daniel K. M. Yamashiro, Religious Influences on Crisis Presidential Decision-Making: A New Belief in the Operational Code Analysis of George W. Bush. (Harvard U thesis, 2017) online.
- Zelizer, Julian E., ed. (2010). The presidency of George W. Bush : a first historical assessment. Princeton: Princeton University Press. ISBN 9780691149011.

== Historiography ==
- Brands, Hal, and Peter Feaver. "The case for Bush revisionism: Reevaluating the legacy of America’s 43rd president." Journal of Strategic Studies 41.1-2 (2018): 234–274. online

== Books about the 2000 election ==
- Vincent Bugliosi, The Betrayal of America: How the Supreme Court Undermined the Constitution and Chose Our President (2001), ISBN 1-56025-355-X
- Alan M. Dershowitz, Supreme Injustice: How the High Court Hijacked Election 2000 (2001), ISBN 0-19-514827-4
- H. Gillman, The Votes That Counted: How the Court Decided the 2000 Presidential Election (2001), ISBN 0-226-29408-0
- Ellen Nakashima, The Washington Post, et al., Deadlock: The Inside Story of America's Closest Election (2001), ISBN 1-58648-080-4
- The New York Times, 36 Days: The Complete Chronicle of the 2000 Presidential Election Crisis (2001), ISBN 0-8050-6850-3
- David North, The Crisis of American Democracy: The Presidential Elections of 2000 and 2004 (2004), ISBN 1-875639-36-5
- Richard A. Posner, Breaking the Deadlock: The 2000 Election, the Constitution, and the Courts (2001), ISBN 0-691-09073-4
- Jack N. Rakove (ed.), The Unfinished Election of 2000 (2002), ISBN 0-465-06838-3
- Larry J. Sabato, Overtime! The Election 2000 Thriller (2001), ISBN 0-321-10028-X
- Jake Tapper, Down and Dirty: The Plot to Steal the Presidency (2001), ISBN 0-316-83264-2
- Jeffrey Toobin, Too Close to Call: The Thirty-Six-Day Battle to Decide the 2000 Election (2002), ISBN 0-375-76107-1

== Books about the 2004 election ==
- Bob Fitrakis, Did George W. Bush Steal America's 2004 Election? (2005), ISBN 0-9710438-9-2
- Steve Freeman and Joel Bleifuss, Was the 2004 Presidential Election Stolen?: Exit Polls, Election Fraud, and the Official Count (2005), ISBN 1-58322-687-7
- Anita Miller, What Went Wrong In Ohio: The Conyers Report On The 2004 Presidential Election (2005), ISBN 0-89733-535-X
- Mark Crispin Miller, Fooled Again (2005), ISBN 0-465-04579-0
