= Post-presidency of George W. Bush =

Actions of U.S. President George W. Bush after leaving office

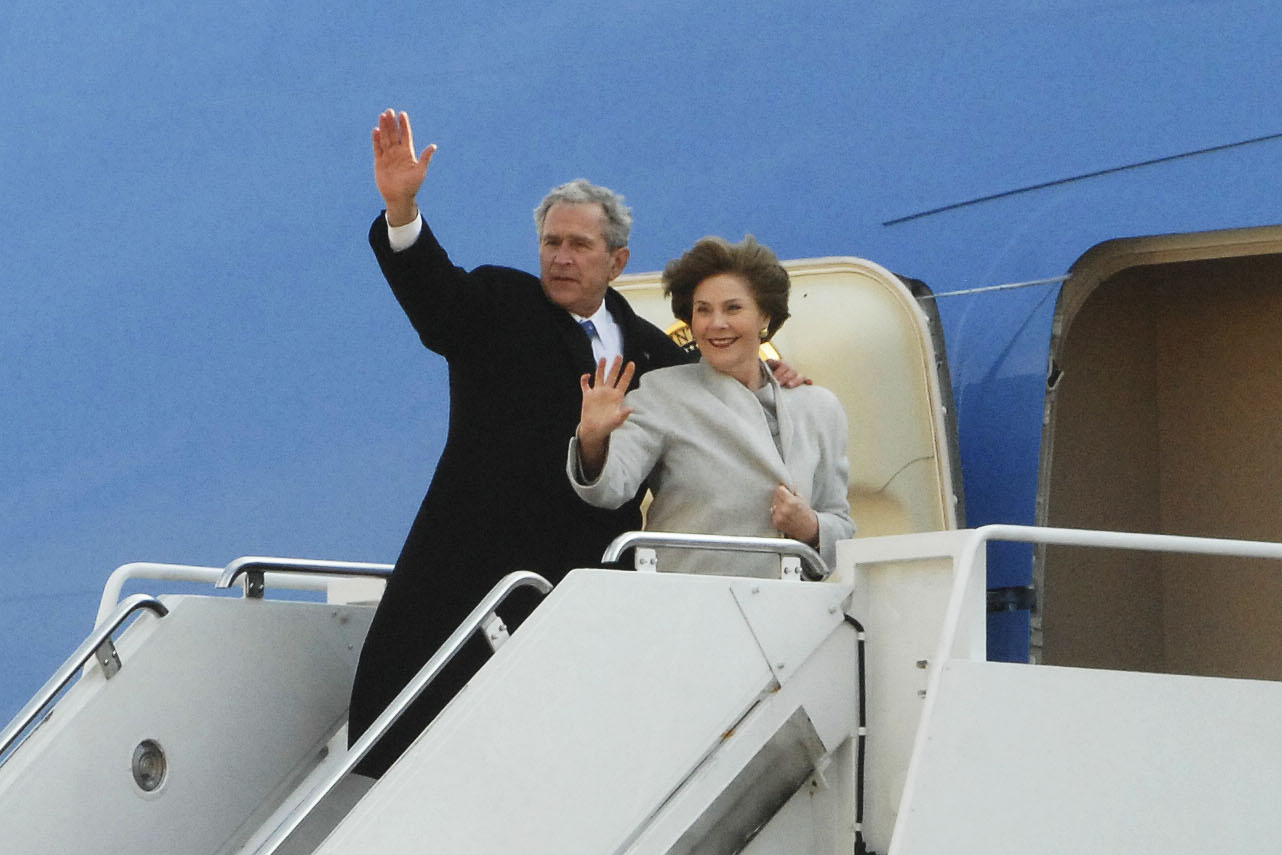
Former President George W. Bush and former First Lady Laura Bush wave from the departing aircraft after the inauguration of Barack Obama on January 20, 2009.

On January 20, 2009, following the first inauguration of his successor Barack Obama, George W. Bush and his wife Laura Bush retire to their ranch in Crawford, Texas. During his post-presidency, he ended up forming a close friendship with Bill Clinton, and later, with Barack Obama. They appeared together at the inauguration of Joe Biden, the state funeral of Jimmy Carter, and the second inauguration of Donald Trump.

== Residence ==
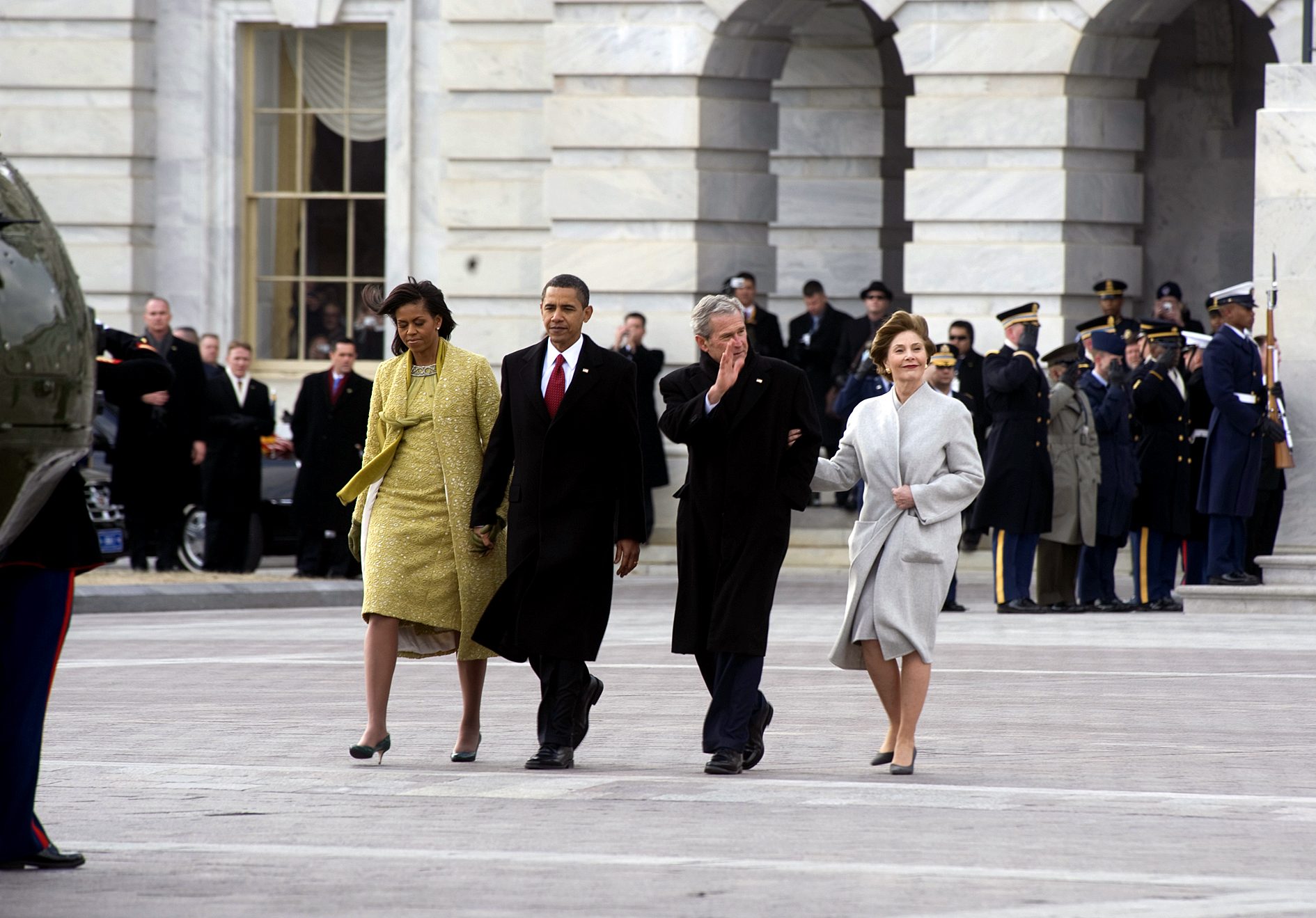
Former president George W. Bush and his wife being escorted to a waiting helicopter by President Barack Obama and First Lady Michelle Obama on January 20, 2009

After the inauguration of Barack Obama, Bush and his family flew from Andrews Air Force Base to a homecoming celebration in Midland, Texas, and then returned to their ranch in Crawford, Texas. They bought a home in the Preston Hollow neighborhood of Dallas where they live.

Bush made regular appearances at various events throughout the Dallas–Fort Worth area, including the opening coin toss at the Dallas Cowboys' first game in the new Cowboys Stadium in Arlington and an April 2009 Texas Rangers game, where he thanked the people of Dallas for helping him settle in, which was met with a standing ovation. He also attended every home playoff game during the Rangers' 2010 season and, accompanied by his father, threw out the ceremonial first pitch at the Rangers Ballpark in Arlington for Game 4 of the 2010 World Series on October 31. He also threw the first pitch in Game 1 of the 2023 World Series.

On August 6, 2013, Bush was successfully treated for a coronary artery blockage with a stent. The blockage had been found during an annual medical examination.

In reaction to the 2016 shooting of Dallas police officers, Bush said: "Laura and I are heartbroken by the heinous acts of violence in our city last night. Murdering the innocent is always evil, never more so than when the lives taken belong to those who protect our families and communities."

== Publications and appearances ==
=== First Obama term (2009–2013) ===
Since leaving office, Bush has kept a relatively low profile. Bush has spoken in favor of increased global participation of women in politics and societal matters in foreign countries.

In March 2009, he delivered his first post-presidency speech in Calgary, Alberta, appeared via video on The Colbert Report during which he praised U.S. troops for earning a "special place in American history", and attended the funeral of Senator Ted Kennedy. Bush made his debut as a motivational speaker on October 26 at the "Get Motivated" seminar in Dallas. In the aftermath of the Fort Hood shooting on November 5, 2009, the Bushes paid an undisclosed visit to the survivors and the victims' families the day following the shooting, having contacted the base commander requesting that the visit be private and not involve press coverage.

Bush released his memoirs, Decision Points, on November 9, 2010. During a pre-release appearance promoting the book, Bush said he considered his biggest accomplishment to be keeping "the country safe amid a real danger", and his greatest failure to be his inability to secure the passage of Social Security reform. He also made news defending his administration's enhanced interrogation techniques, specifically the waterboarding of Khalid Sheikh Mohammed, saying, "I'd do it again to save lives."

In 2012, he wrote the foreword of The 4% Solution: Unleashing the Economic Growth America Needs, an economics book published by the George W. Bush Presidential Center. He also presented the book at the Parkland Memorial Hospital in Dallas, Texas. Bush did not physically appear in that year's Republican National Convention (where Mitt Romney obtained the party's nomination for president), instead appearing in a videotape, in which he –alongside his father and immediate family– explains his motives to support Romney.

=== Second Obama term (2013–2017) ===
Bush appeared on NBC's The Tonight Show with Jay Leno on November 19, 2013, along with his wife Laura. When asked by Leno why he does not comment publicly about the Obama administration, Bush said: "I don't think it's good for the country to have a former president criticize his successor." Despite this statement, Bush vocally disagreed with Obama's withdrawal of U.S. troops from Iraq in 2011, calling it a "strategic blunder". In December, Bush travelled with President Obama to the memorial service of South African president and civil rights leader Nelson Mandela. There, they joined former presidents Bill Clinton and Jimmy Carter.

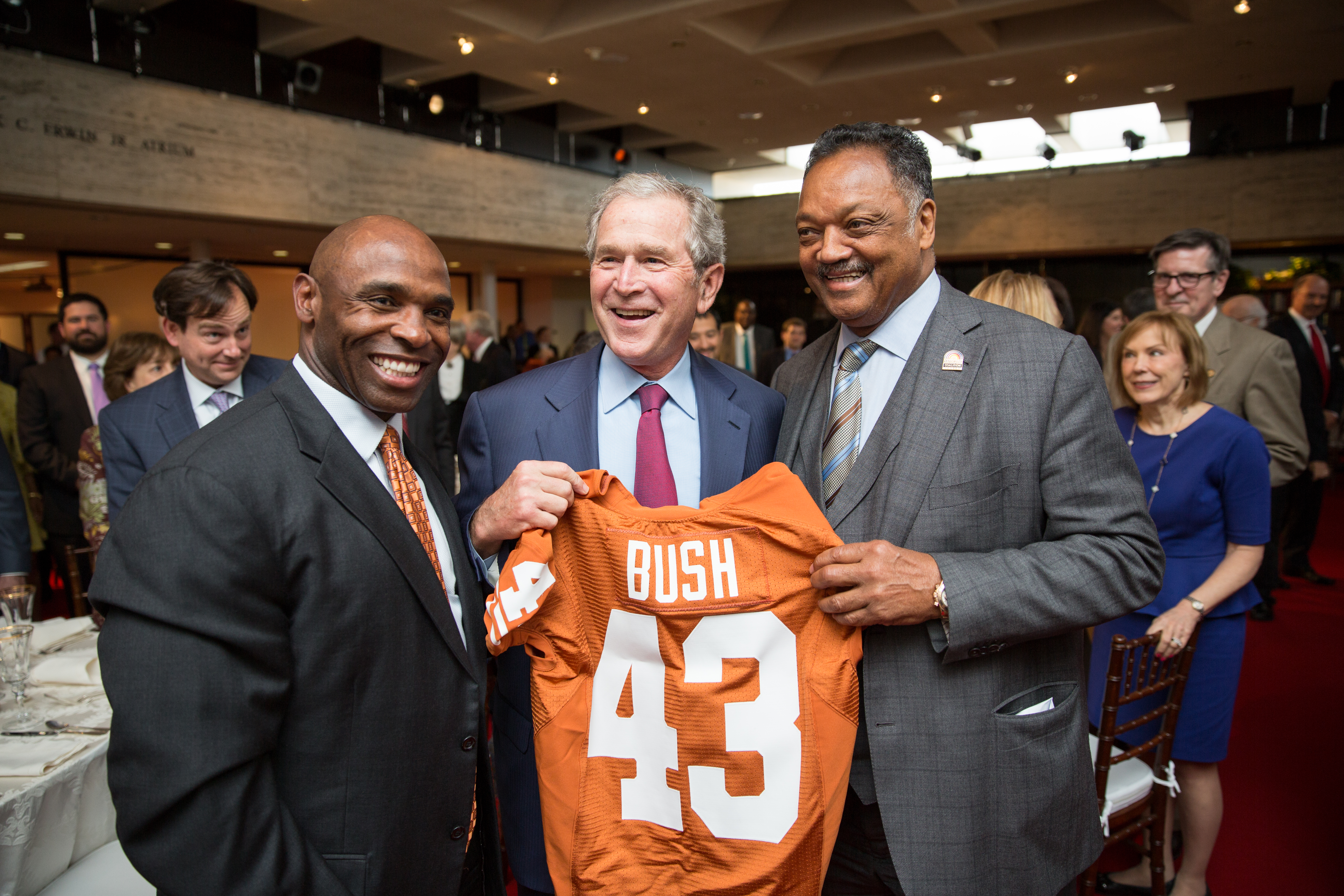
Charlie Strong (left), Texas Longhorns head football coach, George W. Bush and Reverend Jesse Jackson hold up a Texas Longhorns football jersey at the LBJ Presidential Library in 2014.

Alongside the 2014 United States–Africa Leaders Summit, Bush, Michelle Obama, the State Department, and the George W. Bush Institute hosted a daylong forum on education and health with the spouses of the African leaders attending the summit. Bush urged African leaders to avoid discriminatory laws that make the treatment of HIV/AIDS more difficult. On November 2, Bush spoke at an event to 200 business and civic leaders at the George W. Bush Presidential Library and Museum to raise awareness for the upcoming Museum of the Bible in Washington D.C. On November 11, Bush published a biography of his father titled 41: A Portrait of My Father.

In an interview published by Israel Hayom magazine on June 12, 2015, Bush said that "boots on the ground" would be needed to defeat the Islamic State of Iraq and the Levant (ISIS). He added that people had said during his presidency that he should withdraw American troops from Iraq, but he chose the opposite, sending 30,000 more troops to defeat Al Qaeda in Iraq, and that they indeed were defeated. Bush was also asked about Iran but declined to answer, stating that any answer he gives would be interpreted as undermining Obama.

During the early stages of the 2016 Republican presidential primaries, Bush spoke and campaigned for his brother Jeb Bush at a South Carolina rally. However, the party's nomination eventually went to Donald Trump, whom Bush refused to endorse. Furthermore, he did not attend the party's convention. On the eve of Trump's nomination, it was reported that Bush had privately expressed concern about the current direction of the Republican Party, telling a group of his former aides and advisors that "I'm worried that I will be the last Republican president." According to a spokesperson for the Bush family, he did not vote for either Trump or Hillary Clinton in the general election, instead choosing to leave his presidential ballot blank.

After the 2016 elections, Bush, his father, and his brother Jeb called Trump on the phone to congratulate him on his victory.

=== First Trump term (2017–2021) ===
On January 20, 2017, Bush and his wife attended Trump's first inauguration. Images of Bush struggling to put on a rain poncho during the ceremony became an internet meme. While leaving the event, Bush allegedly described the ceremony, and Trump's inaugural address in particular, as "some weird shit".

In February 2017, Bush released a book of his own portraits of veterans called Portraits of Courage. In August, following the white nationalist Unite the Right rally, Bush and his father released a joint statement condemning the violence and ideologies present there. Subsequently, Bush gave a speech in New York where he noted of the current political climate, "Bigotry seems emboldened. Our politics seems more vulnerable to conspiracy theories and outright fabrication." He continued, "Bigotry in any form is blasphemy against the American creed and it means the very identity of our nation depends on the passing of civic ideals to the next generation", while urging citizens to oppose threats to American democracy and be positive role models for young people. The speech was widely interpreted as a denouncement of Donald Trump and his ideologies, despite Bush not mentioning Trump by name.

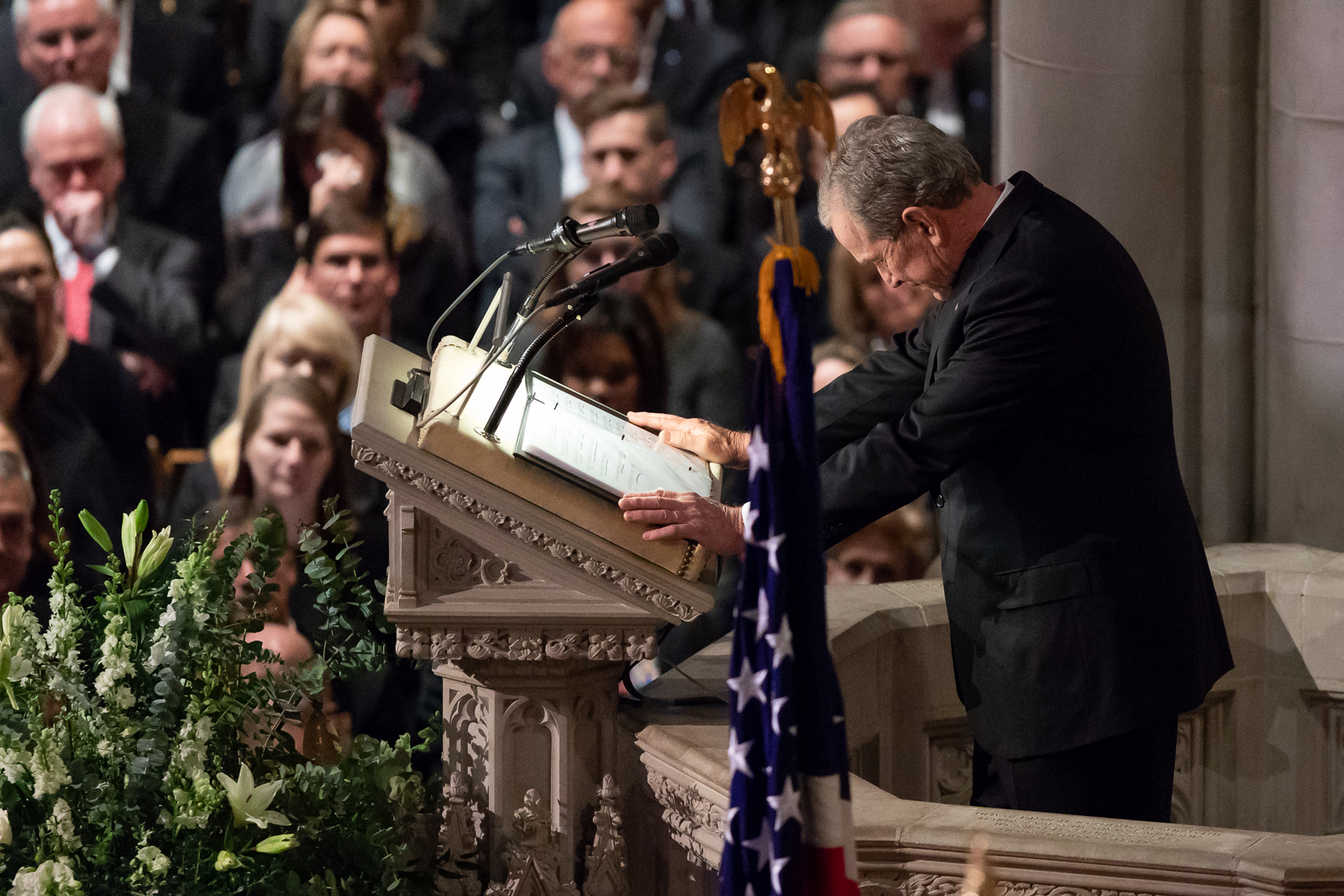
Bush eulogizing his father at the National Cathedral, December 5, 2018

On September 1, 2018, Bush and his wife attended the funeral of John McCain at the Washington National Cathedral in Washington, D.C. where Bush delivered remarks at the service. On November 30, his father died at his home. Shortly before his death, Bush was able to talk with his father on the phone; his father responded with what would be his last words, "I love you too". Bush attended his father's funeral on December 5, delivering a eulogy. In May 2019 on the tenth anniversary of former South Korean president Roh Moo-hyun's death, Bush visited South Korea to pay respects to Roh, delivering a short eulogy.

On June 1, 2020, Bush released a statement addressing the murder of George Floyd and the subsequent nationwide reaction and protests. In the statement, Bush wrote that he and former first lady Laura Bush "are anguished by the brutal suffocation of George Floyd and disturbed by the injustice and fear that suffocate our country". He also elaborated on the racial injustices perpetrated by the police, saying that "it is time for America to examine our tragic failures" and adding "Many doubt the justice of our country, and with good reason. Black people see the repeated violation of their rights without an urgent and adequate response from American institutions". On July 30, Bush and his wife, along with former presidents Bill Clinton and Barack Obama, attended and spoke at the funeral for civil rights leader and congressman John Lewis at Ebenezer Baptist Church in Atlanta.

Bush did not give any endorsements during the 2020 presidential election, but held a virtual fundraiser for U.S. senators Susan Collins (R-ME), Cory Gardner (R-CO), Martha McSally (R-AZ), and Thom Tillis (R-NC). All four were up for reelection and were struggling in the polls. He also did not attend the 2020 Republican National Convention where President Trump was re-nominated. In April 2021, Bush told People magazine that he did not vote for either Trump or Joe Biden in the general election. Instead, he wrote in Condoleezza Rice, who served as his national security advisor from 2001 to 2005 and as his secretary of state from 2005 to 2009. When the election was called for Biden, Bush congratulated him and his running mate Kamala Harris. He also congratulated Trump and his supporters "on a hard-fought campaign". Bush's outreach to Biden was notable since Republican candidate Donald Trump had not yet conceded. Bush then issued a statement saying that while Trump was within his rights to call for recounts, he believed the election was "fundamentally fair" and that "its outcome is clear", and said he would offer Biden "my prayers for his success, and my pledge to help in any way I can", as he had for Trump and Obama.

On January 6, 2021, following the U.S. Capitol attack, Bush denounced the violence and attack alongside the three other living former presidents, Obama, Clinton, and Carter, releasing a statement saying that "this is how election results are disputed in a banana republic, not our democratic republic", and that "it is a sickening and heartbreaking sight". He also echoed president-elect Biden's message saying that what occurred at the capitol was an "insurrection".

=== Biden term (2021–2025) ===
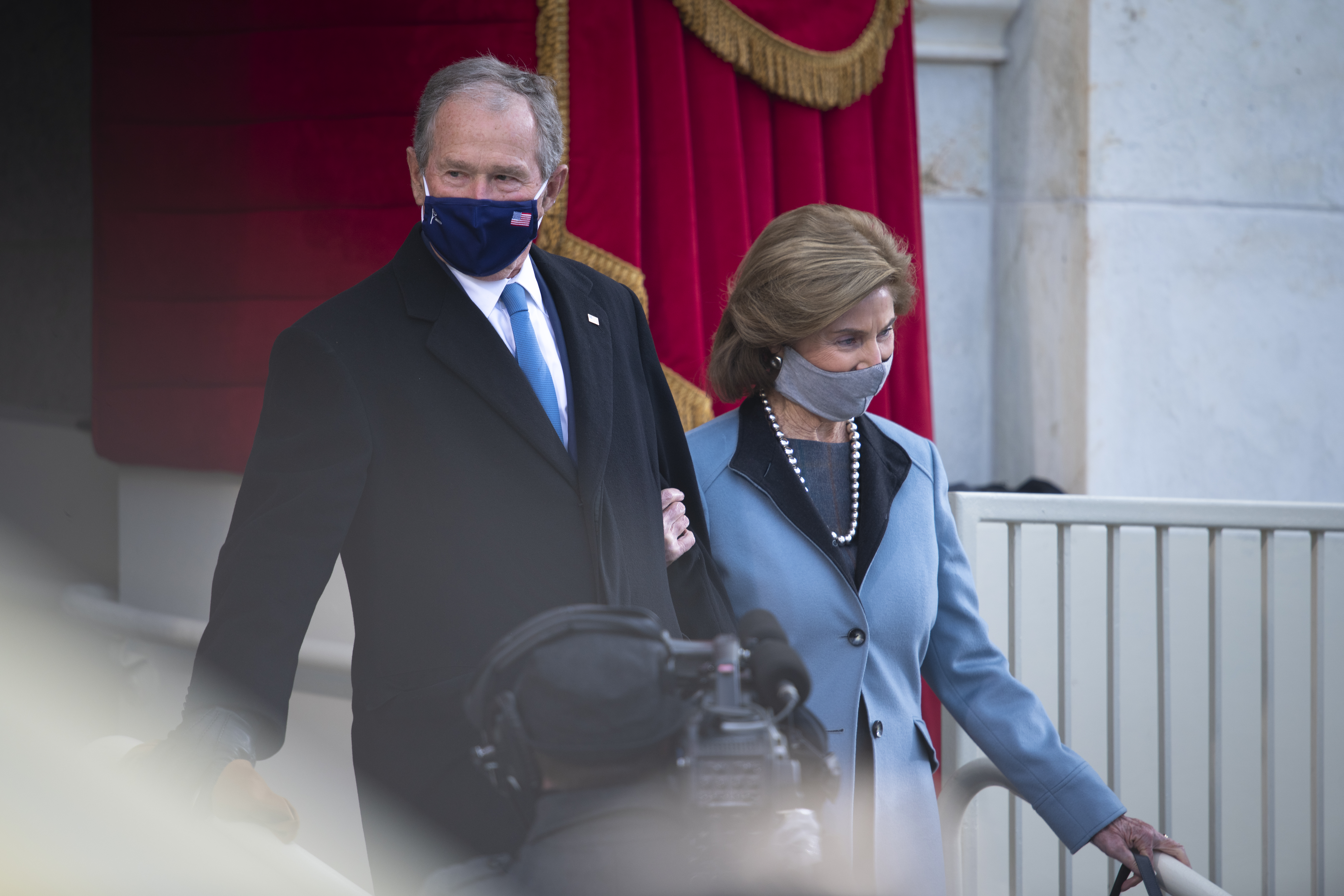
George W. Bush and Laura at the inauguration of Joe Biden on January 20, 2021

On January 20, 2021, Bush and his wife attended Biden's inauguration. Bush opposed President Biden's withdrawal of American troops from Afghanistan, saying that the withdrawal made him "concerned" and that it had the potential to "create a vacuum, and into that vacuum is likely to come people who treat women as second class citizens". During an interview with Deutsche Welle on July 14, 2021, Bush reaffirmed his opposition to the troop withdrawal, calling the plan "a mistake".

On September 11, 2021, the 20th anniversary of the September 11 attacks, Bush gave a speech at the Flight 93 National Memorial, praising the heroism of the people on Flight 93 and the spirit of America. He also said that he "saw millions of people instinctively grab for a neighbor's hand and rally to the cause of one another. That is the America I know."

Bush condemned the assassination attempt on then-former president Trump, who was the presumptive Republican nominee, on July 13, 2024, calling it "cowardly" and applauded the Secret Service's response. However, Bush did not participate in that year's Republican National Convention, which took place two days after the attempt, and where Trump was nominated for a third time. He also chose not to endorse any candidate in the presidential election. After the election was called for Trump, Bush offered his congratulations to him and his running mate JD Vance. He stated that the large turnout for the election was a "sign of the health of our republic and the strength of our democratic institutions". He also congratulated Biden and Harris on their years of public office.

=== Second Trump term (2025–present) ===
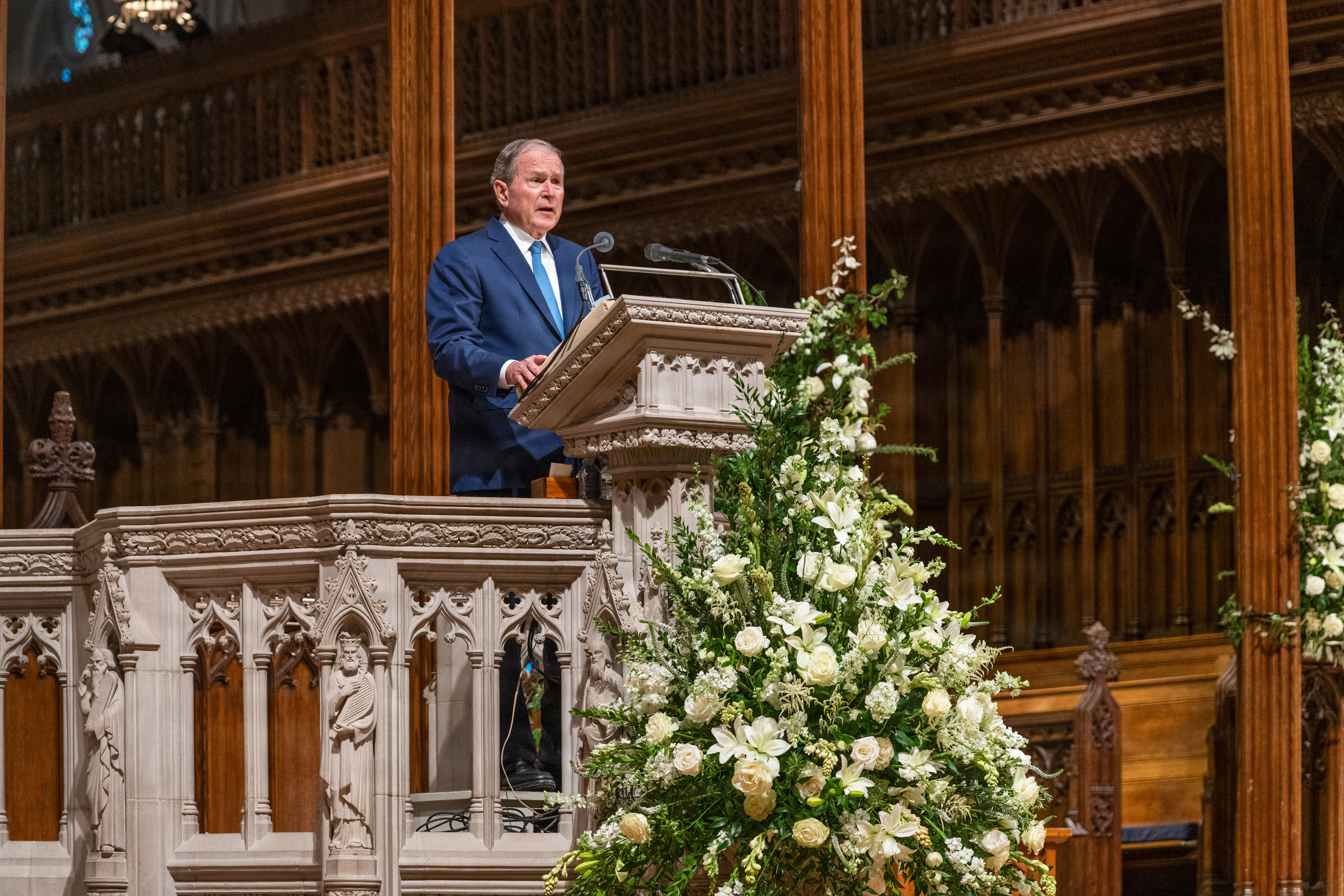
Bush attending Dick Cheney's funeral on November 20, 2025

On January 20, 2025, Bush and his wife attended Trump's second inauguration. On September 10, 2025, Bush released a statement condemning the assassination of Charlie Kirk. He wrote "Today, a young man was murdered in cold blood while expressing his political views. It happened on a college campus, where the open exchange of opposing ideas should be sacrosanct." He also elaborated on political violence in the United States: "Violence and vitriol must be purged from the public square. Members of other political parties are not our enemies; they are our fellow citizens. May God bless Charlie Kirk and his family, and may God guide America toward civility."

After Peyton Manning tried to get Bush to appear on Monday Night Football with Peyton and Eli for five years, Bush relented. On the show on November 17, 2025, Bush said that he grew up a Houston Astros and a Houston Oilers fan watching Earl Campbell and Dan Pastorini (he called Pastorini, Dante Pastorini) play for the Oilers. Bush also mentioned Billy "White Shoes" Johnson. Bush said that he and his group bought the Texas Rangers and he moved to Dallas the same year that Jerry Jones bought the Dallas Cowboys. At that time, Bush got to know Jones well and switched his allegiance to the Cowboys. Bush mentioned that his father liked the Houston Texans and the Astros, calling him a loyal Houston guy. He said George H. W. Bush was a friend of the Texans' owner. When Peyton Manning asked George W. Bush if he thought that he would have a job in public service, Bush answered no and that he would have behaved a lot better in college if he had known. "I admired my dad a lot... he never said, this is what you have to do with your life, he just said, here's this kind of way I'd like you to live, honesty and decency and compassion, but you be what you want to be... it took me a while to figure out what I wanted to be, by the way."

Bush talked about growing up in Midland, Texas. He said you either picked art or football. "I chose football." He has run marathons. Willie Mays has been a hero of his. On November 20, 2025, Bush and his wife attended the funeral of his former vice president Cheney at the Washington National Cathedral in Washington, D.C., where Bush spoke. Bush and his wife attended the dedication ceremony of the Barack Obama Presidential Center on June 18, 2026.

== Collaborations ==
President Obama with former presidents Clinton and Bush present the Clinton Bush Haiti Fund after the 2010 earthquake

In January 2010, at President Obama's request, Bush and Bill Clinton established the Clinton Bush Haiti Fund to raise contributions for relief and recovery efforts after the 2010 Haiti earthquake earlier that month. On May 2, 2011, President Obama called Bush, who was at a restaurant with his wife, to inform him that Osama bin Laden had been killed. The Bushes joined the Obamas in New York City to mark the tenth anniversary of the September 11, 2001, terrorist attacks. At the Ground Zero memorial, Bush read a letter that President Abraham Lincoln wrote to a widow who had lost five sons during the Civil War.

On September 7, 2017, Bush partnered with former presidents Jimmy Carter, George H. W. Bush, Bill Clinton, and Barack Obama to work with One America Appeal to help the victims of Hurricane Harvey and Hurricane Irma in the Gulf Coast and Texas communities. Over the years, President Bush has had a good-natured friendship with Michelle Obama. "President Bush and I, we are forever seatmates because of protocol, and that's how we sit at all the official functions," Obama told the Today Show. "He's my partner in crime at every major thing where all the 'formers' gather. So we're together all the time." Bush famously passed mints to Obama during the McCain funeral in September 2018 and gave them to her again during the funeral of his father in December 2018.

== Art career ==
Bush working on a canvas in his studio in 2017.

In 2012, three years after leaving office, Bush began painting as a hobby after reading Winston Churchill's essay "Painting as a Pastime" because he was looking for a way to combat post-presidential boredom. In 2013, Bush said in an interview that he paints daily, and works with an instructor once a week at his Dallas home, "I love to paint. Painting has changed my life in an unbelievably positive way." Subjects have included people, dogs, and still life.

He has also painted self-portraits and portraits of world leaders, including Vladimir Putin and Tony Blair. In February 2017, Bush released a book of portraits of veterans, Portraits of Courage. The net proceeds from his book are donated to the George W. Bush Presidential Center. In May 2019, on the tenth anniversary of former South Korean president Roh Moo-hyun's death, George Bush drew a portrait of Roh to give to his family.
