= Mickey Herskowitz =

American journalist and biographer (born 1933)

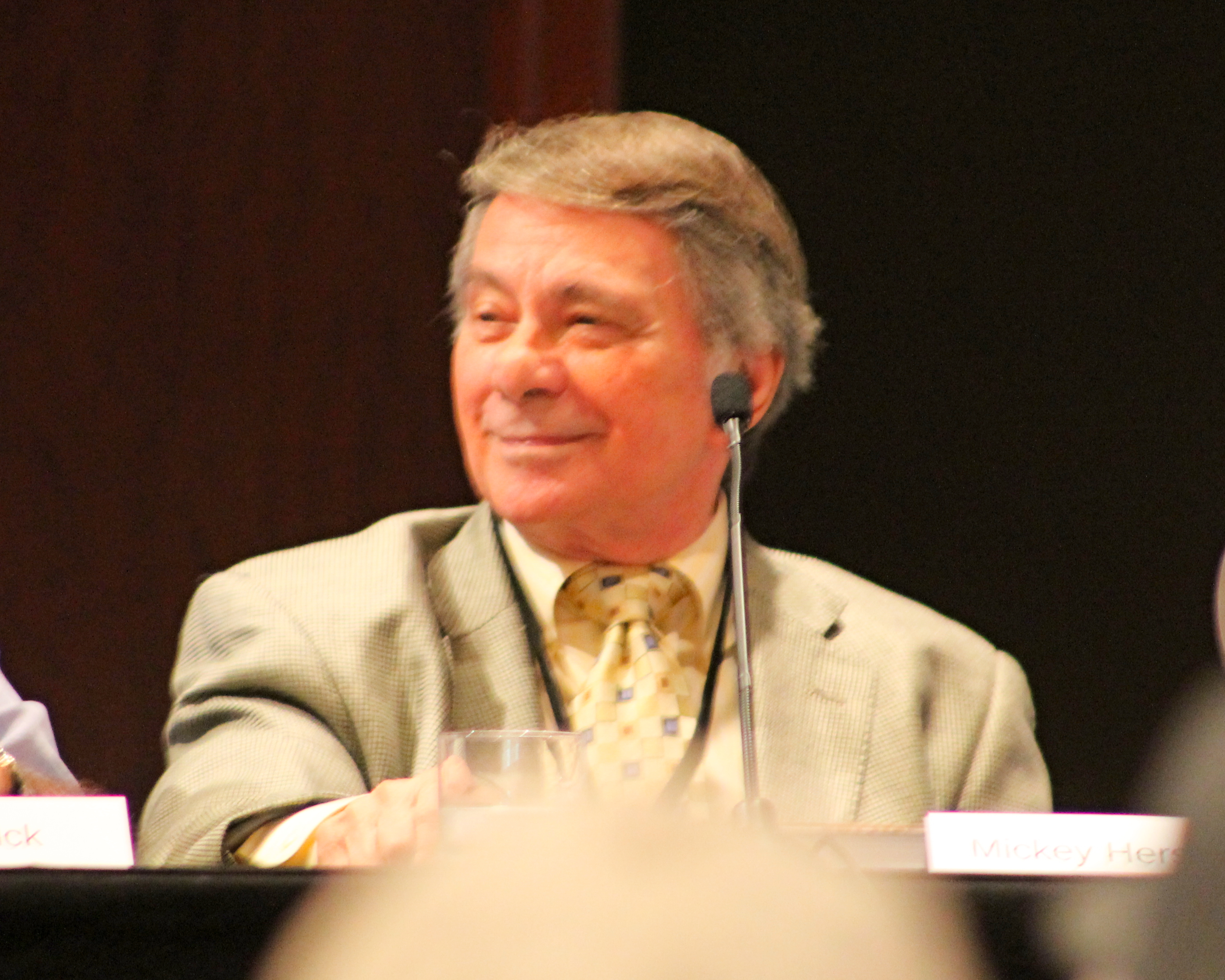
- Herskowitz in Houston in 2014
- Born: April 4, 1933 (age 93); Houston, Texas, U.S.
- Occupation: Author

Milton Leon "Mickey" Herskowitz (born April 4, 1933) is an American journalist and biographer. He has written more than 50 books and has published autobiographies with several athletes. He was a sportswriter and columnist for the Houston Post and the Houston Chronicle, and a former ghost writer for George W. Bush.

== Early life ==
He was born to Herbert S. and Sarah Rheva Herskowitz. Herskowitz's father was born in Illinois, the son of immigrants from Czechoslovakia who relocated to El Paso, Texas in 1910. His mother was born in Saint John, New Brunswick in 1904, but who later lived in Matamoras, Mexico before relocating to Texas. She met and married Herbert there in 1930. He had an older sister named Phyllis Florence Herskowitz. Herskowitz is of Jewish descent.

== Writing ==
After writing sports articles and a column for years, he attended the 1972 Summer Olympics in Munich, Germany, where he met television sportscaster Howard Cosell, who had just signed a contract for his biography. He asked Herskowitz to ghostwrite it for him. After agreeing to write The Camera Never Blinks with Dan Rather, other projects were delayed because of the "pressure" to finish the Rather book.

He has authored over 50 books, many of them jointly written autobiographies of famous Americans in politics, sports and media (including Gene Autry, Nolan Ryan, Paul “Bear” Bryant, George Allen, Tom Kite, John Connally and Prescott Bush), and others ghostwritten autobiographies of celebrities in similar fields (including Dan Rather, Mickey Mantle, Howard Cosell, Bette Davis, Shirley Jones, Marty Ingels and Gene Tierney).

=== A Charge to Keep ===
Herskowitz held many meetings with the then-Texas Governor George W. Bush in preparation for an upcoming project, and soon struck a deal with Bush in 1999 about a ghost-written autobiography, a book which was eventually titled A Charge to Keep. The contract that both parties signed ensured the proceeds would be split between the two. The publisher of the book was William Morrow and Company. Herskowitz was given unprecedented access to Bush and met him around 20 times to discuss the project. Work on the autobiography began in May 1999, and within two months Herskowitz had completed all chapters, and submitted ten. Herskowitz was replaced after Bush's handlers decided that the candidate's views and life experiences were not being cast in a sufficiently positive light.

Herskowitz once said of his former employer: "He thought of himself as a superior, more modern politician than his father and [the elder Bush’s close adviser and friend] Jim Baker. He told me, ‘[My father] could have done anything [during the Gulf War]. He could have invaded Switzerland. If I had that political capital, I would have taken Iraq."

== Other ==
In response to Astroturf replacing the natural grass inside the Astrodome, Herskowitz commented, "Now Houston has the only ballpark in the major leagues with its own built-in, infield fly."

In 1972, Herskowitz covered the tragedy at the Munich Olympics. He was inducted into the Texas Baseball Hall of Fame in 1997, and was the 3rd annual recipient of the Jimmy Wynn "Toy Cannon Award" in 2006, for community service.

He was known for his occasional series "Letters from Lefty" about a mythical southpaw pitcher for the lowly Houston Colt .45s. He was hapless, only getting through an inning by the miraculous fielding plays of his team or simply pure luck. Lefty's style of writing was self-effacing and his ability backed it up. The best of these columns were compiled into a book that was popular locally in Houston. Herskowitz covered the first game in 1962 played by the Colt .45s, who later became the Houston Astros.
