= Ezinne Uzo-Okoro =

Ezinne Uzo-Okoro is a Nigerian-American aerospace engineer, policy adviser, and expert in space systems and in-space capabilities. She is best known for pioneering the concept of In-Space Servicing, Assembly, and Manufacturing (ISAM), a suite of capabilities for sustaining, building, and transforming space infrastructure, and for leading the development of U.S. government strategy and policy to implement ISAM across civil, national security, and commercial sectors. Uzo-Okoro coined the term ISAM, chaired the interagency working group that produced the National ISAM Strategy and National ISAM Implementation Plan, and helped establish COSMIC (Consortium for Space Mobility and ISAM Capabilities) to coordinate government and private sector efforts in this field.

== Early life and education ==
Uzo-Okoro was born in Nigeria and grew up in the city of Owerri. She earned a bachelor’s degree from Rensselaer Polytechnic Institute. She holds three master’s degrees: one in Aerospace Systems from Johns Hopkins University, one in Space Robotics from MIT's Media Lab, and one in Public Policy from Harvard University. Uzo-Okoro completed her PhD in Aeronautics and Astronautics at MIT, where her dissertation focused on advancing on-orbit robotic assembly, a foundational technical implementation of ISAM concepts. She is the first black woman to earn such a degree from MIT.

== Career ==
=== NASA ===
Uzo-Okoro began her career at the National Aeronautics and Space Administration in 2004. Over 17 years, she contributed to engineering, mission design, and technical leadership across more than 60 space missions covering Earth science, planetary science, heliophysics (contributing to the TRACERS, MAGIC, and PUNCH missions), astrophysics, human exploration, and space communications. She held roles at NASA Headquarters, Ames Research Center, and Goddard Space Flight Center, including leadership of the Small Spacecraft Mission Design Division. Her research contributed to NASA-owned patents.

=== White House Office of Science and Technology Policy ===
Uzo-Okoro joined the White House Office of Science Technology and Policy (OSTP) as Assistant Director for Space Policy as a career civil servant. She worked on national space strategy and infrastructure policies, including orbital debris, space weather preparedness, climate and Earth observation infrastructure, aeronautics, and manufacturing policy. In this role, she led the interagency effort defining national policy for ISAM capabilities, which encompass servicing, assembly, and manufacturing of space assets to extend life, improve performance, and enable sustained operations beyond Earth orbit. She chaired the National Science and Technology Council’s ISAM Interagency Working Group, which produced a National ISAM Strategy and National ISAM Implementation Plan to guide U.S. government, academic, and commercial activity in this domain. She also chaired the Aeronautics Interagency Working Group and co-chaired the Committee On Environment's Subcommittee On United States Group On Earth Observations, the Committee on Space Weather Operations, Research, and Mitigation, and Low Earth Orbit Science and Technology. She left the White House in 2024.

=== ISAM and COSMIC ===
ISAM refers to capabilities and operations in space that enable inspection, life extension, repair, upgrading, relocation, refueling, assembly, and on-orbit manufacturing of space systems, with applications in Earth orbit, cislunar space, deep space, and on celestial bodies. It is positioned as a national imperative for sustainable space infrastructure and the growth of the space economy. Under Uzo-Okoro’s leadership in government and through the Consortium for Space Mobility and ISAM Capabilities (COSMIC), these capabilities have been coordinated among industry, civil space agencies, defense, and academic partners.

=== Other Roles and Recognition ===
After leaving OSTP, Uzo-Okoro became a senior fellow at the Harvard Kennedy School Belfer Center for Science and International Affairs, working with the Defense, Emerging Technology, and Strategy Program. Uzo-Okoro is a member of the Council on Foreign Relations and a member of the Space Task Force, which produced a space report in February 2025. She is also a partner at the venture capital firm, SineWave Ventures. She was a Presidential Leadership Scholar in 2018, where she formed terraformers.com, a permaculture platform focused on food security. Her immigration story is included in President George W. Bush’s book, Out of Many, One.
