= A Charge to Keep I Have =

Christian hymn text by Charles Wesley

- Hymn
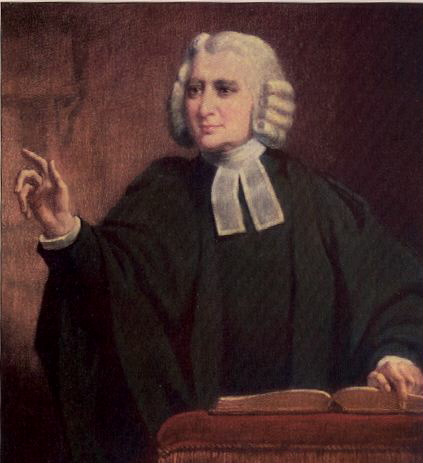
- Wesley preaching
- Text: Charles Wesley
- Language: English
- Based on: Leviticus 8:35
- Meter: double short meter
- Melody: Boylston by Lowell Mason
- Composed: 1832
- Published: 1762

"A Charge to Keep I Have" is a hymn written by Charles Wesley. It was first published in 1762 in Wesley's Short Hymns on Select Passages of the Holy Scriptures. The words are based on Leviticus 8:35. It is most commonly sung to the hymn tune Boylston by Lowell Mason.

== History ==
"A Charge to Keep I Have" was first published as hymn number 188 in Charles Wesley's 1762 anthology, Short Hymns on Select Passages of the Holy Scriptures. This collection included various hymns on each book of the Bible. The hymn is one of 21 inspired by verses from the Book of Leviticus. "A Charge to Keep I Have" was later included in A Collection of Hymns, for the Use of the People Called Methodists, published in 1780 by Charles's brother John Wesley. It was, though, removed from the second edition of Short Hymns in 1794.

The words were inspired by Leviticus 8:35, in which God, through Moses, gives instructions to Aaron and his sons, for their service as priests. He commands them to "keep the charge of the LORD, that ye die not." Other Bible verses reflected in the words include Hosea 6:2, Matthew 25:30, 1 Corinthians 4:2 and 2 Peter 1:10.

Wesley's words draw closely on Matthew Henry's commentary on Leviticus 8:31–36, first published in 1706:

We have every one of us a charge to keep, an eternal God to glorify, an immortal soul to provide for, needful duty to be done, our generation to serve; and it must be our daily care to keep this charge, for it is the charge of the Lord our Master, who will shortly call us to an account about it, and it is at our peril if we neglect it. Keep it ‘that ye die not’; it is death, eternal death, to betray the trust we are charged with.

Hymnologist Erik Routley described Wesley's use of Henry's commentary as "a very unusual manner of treating Scripture," asserting: "I cannot recall any other example of a hymn writer taking down a commentary and putting its contents into verse."

== Text ==
=== Original words ===
In its original form, the hymn has two stanzas, each containing eight lines, written in double short meter (66.86 D).

A charge to keep I have,
A God to glorify,
A never-dying soul to save,
And fit it for the sky;
To serve the present age,
My calling to fulfil:
O may it all my powers engage
To do my Master’s will!

Arm me with jealous care,
As in thy sight to live,
And O! thy servant, Lord, prepare
A strict account to give:
Help me to watch and pray,
And on thyself rely,
Assur’d, if I my trust betray,
I shall for ever die.

In most hymnals, the stanzas are divided into two, to create two verses with four lines each.

=== Final lines ===
The final two lines are changed in several hymnbooks, to remove the reference to eternal death for apostasy ("I shall for ever die"). In the 1904 edition of Hymns Ancient and Modern, the lines were changed to:

And let me ne’er my trust betray
But press to realms on high.

In the 1983 Methodist hymn book Hymns and Psalms, they were changed to:

So shall I not my trust betray,
Nor love within me die.

The verse has also been changed to read:

So shall I not my trust betray
nor shall I ever die.

== Tune ==
The hymn is most commonly sung to the tune Boylston, composed in 1832 by Lowell Mason. This tune was originally published in The Choir or Union Collection of Church Music, as music for a hymn entitled "Our Days are as Grass". In Methodist hymnals, "A Charge to Keep I Have" has sometimes been paired with St Thomas, written by Aaron Williams, or Cambridge, by Ralph Harrison, both composed in the 18th century.

== Modern usage ==
The hymn remains popular, and is included in several hymnals across different denominations, including The Song Book of the Salvation Army (1986), The United Methodist Hymnal (1989), The Baptist Hymnal (1991) and Singing the Faith (2011). It has often been used at the end of conferences, to inspire attendees for service.

"A Charge to Keep I Have" became popular in Black churches in America in the 19th and 20th centuries. As with other traditional hymns, the music was significantly altered; Eddie Glaude has described such hymns as being "radically transformed by haunting and beautiful arrangements."

The hymn has been influential for George W. Bush, who based the title of his 1999 autobiography A Charge to Keep on this hymn. It was also played at the service marking his inauguration as Governor of Texas in 1995. Bush said he was "particularly impressed" by the lines: "To serve the present age, my calling to fulfill / O may it all my powers engage to do my Master's will." He saw these words as summarising his mission. A painting with the same name, by W.H.D. Koerner, was loaned to Bush when he became Governor. In a memo to staff, Bush wrote:

When you come into my office, please take a look at the beautiful painting of a horseman determinedly charging up what appears to be a steep and rough trail. This is us. What adds complete life to the painting for me is the message of Charles Wesley that we serve One greater than ourselves.

An a capella arrangement of the hymn, sung by gospel singer Marion Williams, appears on the soundtrack for the 1991 film Fried Green Tomatoes.
