= George Carpozi Jr. =

George Carpozi Jr. (November 25, 1920 – May 14, 2000) was an American journalist, biographer and non-fiction author.

== Early years ==
He was educated at James Monroe High School, New York University and Dartmouth College. He served in the US Marine Corps from 1943 until 1946. In 1943 while at NYU he was the lead-off in the 2-mile relay team that won National AAU event and team championship at Madison Square Garden.

== Personal life ==
He married Chrysanthe Haranis in 1949 at a Greek Orthodox church in Brooklyn, and the couple had six children. He was a close friend of Steve Dunleavy.

== Journalism ==
Carpozi worked as a journalist for more than fifty years. He began his career as a sportswriter on the Port Chester Daily Item in 1943. He spent five years working as a reporter-writer-editor with Standard News Association. In 1953 he joined the New York Journal-American as a reporter, night city editor and chief assistant city editor. In 1965 he left to join the New York Post. Upon his retirement from the latter, he became News Department Editor on Rupert Murdoch's Star.

Carpozi received 30 awards for journalistic excellence including the New York Press Club's Gold Typewriter Award for his part in bringing to justice George Metesky, New York's Mad Bomber. He won the Uniformed Firefighters Association Plaque for coverage of New York City fires and the National Police Officers Association citation for coverage of police and crime in America. He also received 12 Hearst Newspapers writing awards.

== Books ==
He wrote more than 80 books covering politics, crime, current events and showbusiness biographies. Carpozi was known as the "Biographer to the Stars," having written biographies on Brigitte Bardot, Marilyn Monroe – he conducted an extensive interview with Monroe, was one of the few biographers who knew her and was preparing a new edition of his biography at the time of his death, Clark Gable, Bobby Sherman, Vince Edwards, Jackie Kennedy, Gary Cooper, John Wayne, Frank Sinatra, John Lennon, Bing Crosby, Johnny Cash, Carol Burnett and Cher. He was also the biographer of Kitty Kelley, Anwar Sadat, Andrew Young, Bugsy Siegel and Bill Clinton.

The Los Angeles Times said of him, "Carpozi is the archetypal police reporter, tough with a core of sentiment, knowledgeable about police procedure and courtroom strategy, intensely curious and always active ferreting out tips, watching the deadline for scoops, and not above eavesdropping if the opportunity presents itself ... Carpozi ... is closer to Damon Runyon than Tom Wolfe in his style".

== Death ==
Carpozi died at his home in Belle Terre, Long Island, New York of emphysema and heart failure. He was 79 years old.
