= Wilhelm Heinrich Detlev Körner =

American illustrator (1878–1938)

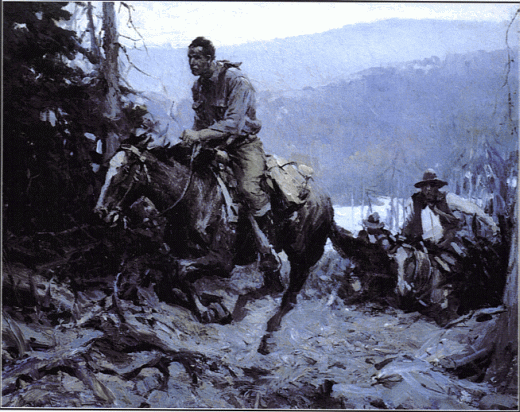
A Charge to Keep. 1916. W.H.D. Koerner

Wilhelm Heinrich Detlev "Big Bill" Körner (November 1878 – August 11, 1938), also known as Wilhelm Heinrich Dethlef Koerner, William HD Koerner, WHDK, or W.H.D. Koerner, was a noted illustrator of the American West whose works became known to new audiences when his painting, nicknamed A Charge to Keep, was used as the cover image for the ghostwritten biography by the same name by George W. Bush. This painting, which hung in the Oval Office during the Bush presidency was of special interest to journalists due to the interpretation given by Bush of the painting's meaning in light of the meaning and title attached to the painting by the artist.

== Life and career ==
Koerner was born in Lunden, Schleswig-Holstein, Prussia. His parents immigrated to Clinton, Iowa when he was three years old. Although he had little art training as a youth, his raw talent was always obvious to his parents and to everyone who viewed his sketches. At the age of twenty, Koerner was hired by the Chicago Tribune as a staff artist at $5 per day. Shortly thereafter, he married and accepted a job as art editor for a brand new newspaper, the United States Daily. When the paper folded, he and his wife moved to New York City, where he was hired by Pilgrim Magazine to cover the 1904 St. Louis Exposition. He enrolled at the Art Students League for a two-year program during 1905–07 under George Bridgman, Norman Rockwell's teacher. A student colleague later persuaded Koerner to apply to Howard Pyle's illustration school in Wilmington. Koerner's exposure to Howard Pyle was significant, but his student colleagues also had much to offer and he shared techniques and styles with the likes of N. C. Wyeth, Harvey Dunn, Frank Schoonover and Stanley Arthurs. While still a Pyle student, he rented a studio adjacent to Anton Otto Fischer and William Foster and the interaction between these talented students proved mutually invaluable.

Howard Pyle died in 1911, and Koerner published a tribute in the New Amstel Magazine. A year later, the first exhibition by Pyle's students was presented to the public, and Koerner's works figured prominently. In 1919, the Saturday Evening Post art editor invited Koerner to illustrate two articles with Western themes, which proved to be a major turning point in his life. The articles "The Covered Wagon" and "Traveling the Old Trails" entailed many Western frontier scenes, which up to that point he had not experienced. Koerner began researching, and the West captured his imagination. Koerner soon became one of the best-known artists of the old West, travelling to the area for further research.

From 1922 onwards, Koerner illustrated more than two hundred and fifty stories with Western themes and painted over six hundred pictures for periodicals. He illustrated a number of books that later were made into films based on his illustrations, including those by author Zane Grey (The Drift Fence [film: Drift Fence] and Sunset Pass [three films, all titled Sunset Pass]) and Eugene Manlove Rhodes' classic, Paso Por Aqui (film: Four Faces West). It is estimated he completed nearly two thousand illustrations of which about eighteen hundred were done for magazines, as well as advertisements for C. W. Post's Grape-Nuts and Postum cereals.

Maxfield Parrish influenced Koerner's bold use of color. Parrish illustrated "The Great Southwest" articles by Raymond Stannard Baker which appeared in Century Magazine. A prolific and versatile artist-illustrator, "Big Bill" Koerner's work gained considerable visibility through his cover and story illustrations for the Saturday Evening Post, The Ladies' Home Journal, Harper's Magazine, McClure's Magazine, American Magazine, Cosmopolitan and Redbook. At the time of his death in 1938 at fifty-eight, the artist had received commissions for over 500 paintings and completed drawings for more than 200 western-themed stories. Each week he produced at least one full oil, a head, and a vignette. During the last three years of his life, Koerner was seriously ill and unable to paint. Koerner's illustrations are compared with those of Frederic Remington, Charles M. Russell, Philip R. Goodwin, and Harvey Dunn. They are known for his bold brushwork with a vibrant color palette which enabled his vigorous depictions of the "Great American West", emblematic images of those untamed territories.

== Comic strip ==
Körner also made the short-lived comic strip Hugo Hercules, which was drawn in 1902, but it was terminated after only five months. Despite its short length, it is widely considered to be the first superhero fiction comic.
