= Sunset Pass =

Sunset Pass may refer to:

- Sunset Pass, a Western novel by Zane Grey, initially serialized in 1928, and its film adaptations:
  - Sunset Pass (1929 film), a lost film
  - Sunset Pass (1933 film), starring Randolph Scott
  - Sunset Pass (1946 film)
- Sunset Pass (Arizona), Coconino County, Arizona, United States
  - Battle of Sunset Pass, fought in November 1874 during the Yavapai War
- Sunset Pass (Alberta), Canada - see List of passes of the Rocky Mountains
