= Out of Many, One: Portraits of America's Immigrants =

Book by George W. Bush

- First edition
- Author: George W. Bush
- Illustrator: George W. Bush
- Language: English
- Published: April 20, 2021
- Publisher: Crown Publishing Group
- Publication place: United States
- Pages: 208
- ISBN: 978-0593136966
- Preceded by: Portraits of Courage

Out of Many, One: Portraits of America's Immigrants is a book by former United States president George W. Bush published in April 2021. The book includes forty-three oil portraits by Bush of immigrant Americans. It was a New York Times bestseller. The title of the book is a direct reference to the USA motto, Latin phrase E pluribus unum.

== History ==
Bush's interest in the project arose in 2018 in response to a conversation with his former campaign manager Ken Mehlman, who encouraged him to contribute to the national debate surrounding immigration. Bush was hesitant, however, to involve himself in politics. He waited until August 2020 to announce the project, and did not begin showing the work until after the 2020 Presidential Election.

Prior to the working on the book, Bush met all of the immigrants whose stories are covered in the book. In creating the book, Bush stated "My hope is that Out of Many, One will help focus our collective attention on the positive effects that immigrants have on our country."

Out of Many, One quickly became a New York Times bestseller. The book was also a Newsmax conservative bestseller during the week of May 1, 2021. The paintings and stories were put on display at the George W. Bush Presidential Center in Texas.

== See also ==
- Portraits of Courage: A Commander in Chief's Tribute to America's Warriors, (Bush, 2017)
