= Portraits of Courage =

Book by George W. Bush

Portraits of Courage: A Commander in Chief's Tribute to America's Warriors
- Cover of Portraits of Courage
- Author: George W. Bush
- Illustrator: George W. Bush
- Language: English
- Published: February 28, 2017
- Publisher: Crown
- Publication place: United States
- Media type: Print (hardback)
- Pages: 191
- ISBN: 978-0-8041-8976-7
- OCLC: 965543768
- Preceded by: 41: A Portrait of My Father
- Followed by: Out of Many, One: Portraits of America's Immigrants

Portraits of Courage: A Commander in Chief's Tribute to America's Warriors is a book published in 2017 that includes a collection of oil paintings and stories about military veterans by former U.S. President George W. Bush.

== History ==
Bush's painting started as a post-presidency pastime. He created a set of paintings in the evenings as a way to commemorate some of the veterans he has met since leaving office in 2009. This book is his first art book.

The foreword was written by former First Lady Laura Bush and by General Peter Pace, 16th Chairman of the U.S. Joint Chiefs of Staff. It contains sixty-six full-color portraits and a four-panel mural based on photographs of ninety-eight physically and/or mentally wounded U.S. Armed Forces veterans (Army, Marine Corps, Navy, Air Force) of the Afghanistan and Iraq wars as painted by President Bush. Bush wrote the descriptive prose that accompanies each painting. Bush donated his share of the proceeds from the book to the non-profit George W. Bush Presidential Center.

The book is available as a hardcover and in a limited edition signed by Bush, a deluxe oversized cloth-bound book with a specially designed slipcover. An audio CD read by President Bush was also released. The oil paintings portraying Sergeant First Class Ramon Padilla, Sergeant Daniel Casara, Lance Corporal Timothy John Lang, Sergeant First Class Michael R. Rodriguez, Sergeant Leslie Zimmerman, Sergeant Michael Joseph Leonard Politowicz and Lieutenant Colonel Kent Graham Solheim appear on the cover of the book (left to right, top to bottom).

An exhibition of the portraits ran from March 2 to October 17, 2017 at the George W. Bush Presidential Library and Museum.

On June 9, 2024, an exhibition displaying the portraits began at The American Adventure at Walt Disney World’s Epcot.

== Reception ==
A review by Jonathan Alter in The New York Times called Bush as "an evocative and surprisingly adept artist who has dramatically improved his technique while also doing penance for one of the greatest disasters in American history." In The New Yorker, Jacob Weisberg described Bush's painting of veterans as an artistic turning point for the former president. Whereas Bush has previously painted world leaders, his work on veterans was more personal, according to Weisberg: "these new portraits had genuine emotional content, conveying suffering and dignity."

M. Neelika Jayawardane, a Professor at the State University of New York-Oswego, described it as "troubling that the man who sent millions of US troops to a battlefront is now attempting to re-introduce himself as a person who cares deeply for their wellbeing". Jayawardane noted that "there is no mention of these millions of people whose lives have been laid to waste by America’s imperial wars" and that "Bush puts himself to the foreground and damningly instrumentalises American soldiers as image-rehabilitation tools". Jayawardane concludes, "we should be taking off our shoes, and lobbing them at Bush for his naked attempts to elide his responsibility for the enormity of suffering he created".

== See also ==
- Out of Many, One: Portraits of America's Immigrants, 2021 book by Bush
