= Kitty Kelley =

Author of unauthorized biographies

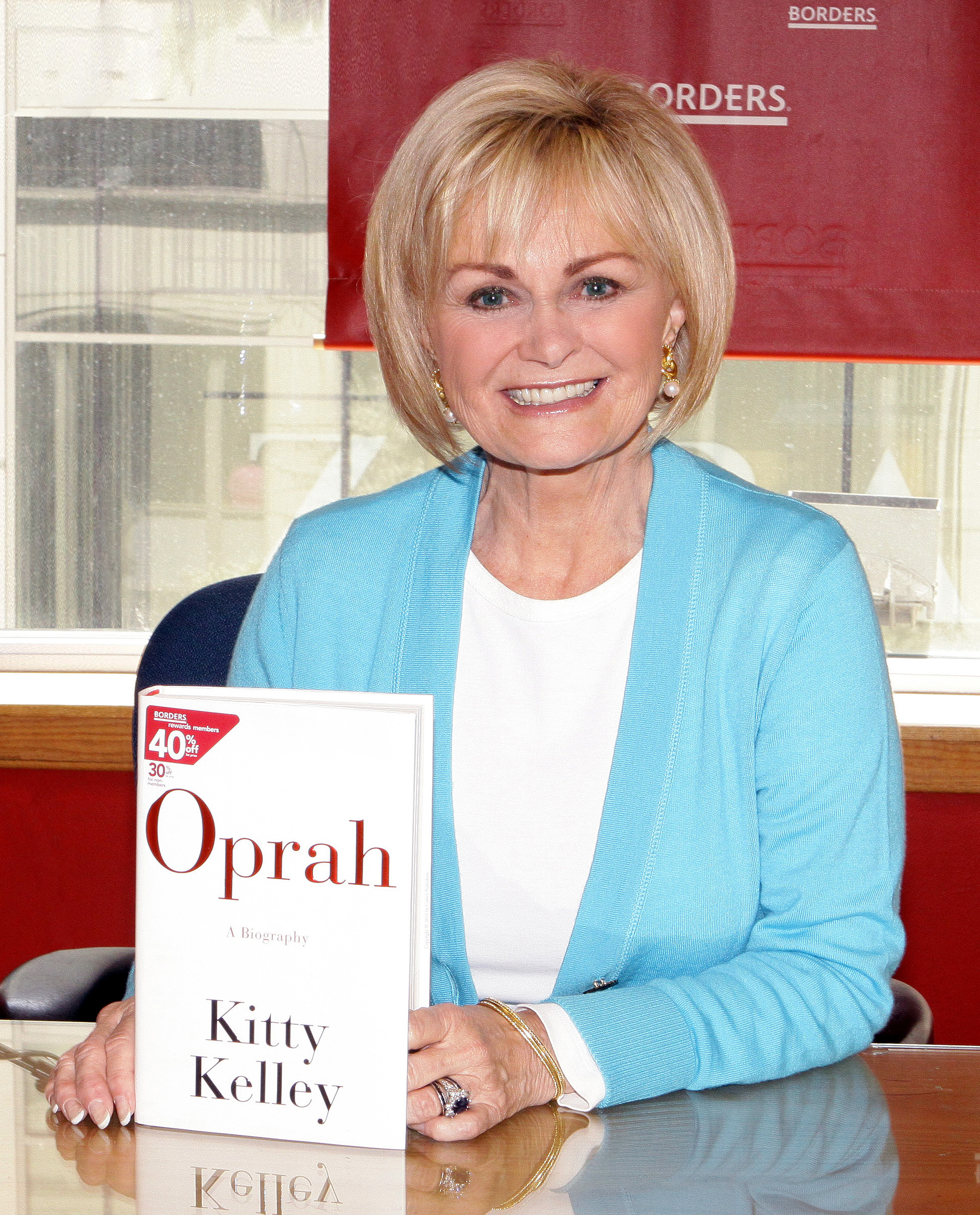
- Kelley in 2010
- Born: Catherine Kelley; April 4, 1942 (age 84); Spokane, Washington, U.S.
- Occupations: Journalist, writer
- Spouse(s): Michael Edgley (m. 1976; div. 1989) John Zucker (m. 1992; died 2011)
- Writing career
- Notable awards: PEN Oakland Censorship Award
- Website: kittykelleywriter.com

Katherine Kelley (born April 4, 1942) is an American journalist and author of best-selling unauthorized biographies of Jacqueline Kennedy Onassis, Elizabeth Taylor, Frank Sinatra, Nancy Reagan, the British royal family, the Bush family, and Oprah Winfrey.

For the Sinatra biography, Kelley won praise for the quality of her research and willingness to risk a lawsuit, but critics have not rated her other works as highly. She has been described as a "professional sensationalist" and the "consummate gossip monger".

== Early life ==
Catherine Kelley was raised in Spokane, Washington, the eldest of seven children of Adele (née Martin) and William Vincent Kelley, a lawyer who served as president of the city's bar association. She had "an unhappy home life with an alcoholic mother" who "wasn’t just a closet drunk. She was often a nasty public drunk." She helped take care of her five sisters, Mary Cary, Ellen, Margaret, Adele Monica and Madeleine Sophie, as well as her brother, John. The family vacationed in Europe and spent summers at their two lakeside cottages in western Idaho. Kelley graduated from St. Augustine's Elementary School and then attended the private prep school Holy Names Academy.

According to the biography Poison Pen by George Carpozi Jr., in 1962, Kelley was expelled from the University of Arizona in lieu of police filing criminal charges for grand larceny against her; the stolen items were expensive pieces of jewelry that Kelley's fellow students had kept in their dorm rooms; one sorority sister reported Kelley had also stolen her corselet and "lots more."

During the aftermath of her leaving the University of Arizona, her parents refused to let her live with them and sent her to live in Seattle with her maternal grandparents, the Martins. It was there that Kelley suffered a breakdown and used a wheelchair during some of that time. After this eight-month hiatus, she surfaced at the University of Washington, where she received a B.A. in English. She worked at the 1964 New York World's Fair and went on to become a receptionist-press secretary for Senator Eugene McCarthy.

Following four years as a press assistant to McCarthy, Kelley worked for two years as the editorial page researcher for The Washington Post. She went on to have a full-time career as a freelance writer. Her articles have appeared in The New York Times, The Wall Street Journal, Newsweek, The Washington Post, People, Ladies Home Journal, McCall's, Los Angeles Times, and the Chicago Tribune.

In 1976, Kelley married Michael Edgley. Edgley was media director for the National Council on Aging. He later quit his job to help Kelley with her early books, even looking in the garbage of Elizabeth Taylor and her then husband, U.S. Senator John Warner. Kelley and Edgley divorced in 1989. In 1992 Kelley married John Zucker, an allergist. Zucker died in 2011.

== Books ==
=== Jacqueline Onassis and Elizabeth Taylor biographies ===
Kelley's first celebrity biography was Jackie Oh! (1978), a life of Jacqueline Kennedy Onassis, which was written at the request of Lyle Stuart, who launched the book into the New York Times Best Seller list. In the book, Kelley describes John F. Kennedy's womanizing and includes "revelations" about Onassis's love life, her depression and electric shock treatment. Kelley's publisher Lyle Stuart was later quoted saying "at the time I believed her shock-treatment story. Looking back, I feel I was had and the whole thing was a fable. I doubt that it ever happened. And knowing how she makes things up, I believe she was sure she could get away with it because no one would sue." Journalist Michael Crowley stated Jackie Oh! contained "core truths—including an unflinching look at JFK that showed him to have been 'more of a Romeo than has been previously revealed.'"

This book was followed by Elizabeth Taylor: The Last Star (1981).

=== His Way ===
Kelley's next book, His Way: The Unauthorized Biography of Frank Sinatra (1986), was declared "an act of bravery." Kelley discussed Sinatra's marriages, affairs and links to the Mob. Sinatra filed a $2 million lawsuit to prevent it from being published but subsequently dropped it.

The book was number one on the New York Times Best Seller list and hit best-seller lists in England, Canada, Australia and France. William Safire of The New York Times said "His Way... turns out to be the most eye-opening celebrity biography of our time." In The Washington Post, Jonathan Yardley wrote that "His Way is such an improvement over her two previous books... that comparisons border on the pointless."

Aside from praise, the book also immediately received backlash, mainly from eyewitnesses to the events described. Actress Elizabeth Taylor, for example, called Kelley "not a biographer, but a fantasist". Dutch historians Ter Braake (PhD) and Ter Braake-Gunsing in 2025 qualified the book as "a hodgepodge of decades-old gossip and lies from tabloid papers and anti-Italian conservative journalists who equated any push for social justice with communism. These ancient stories were mixed with fabricated, distorted and exaggerated testimonies—often from anonymous sources, deceased individuals, former enemies, or people with no close ties to Sinatra whatsoever."

=== People magazine story ===
In 1990, Kelley wrote a piece for People magazine based on interviews she had conducted with Judith Campbell Exner, a former girlfriend of Frank Sinatra's who claimed to have had an affair with John F. Kennedy. Exner told Kelley that she had arranged ten meetings between Kennedy and Mafia gangster Sam Giancana, and they discussed having the mafia kill Fidel Castro. It was subsequently revealed that Exner, who was terminally ill, had been paid $50,000 to talk with Kelley and had not mentioned these "revelations" in her own autobiography, published years earlier. A former FBI agent said that Giancana had been under a federal wiretap, so these multiple meetings with Kennedy would have been impossible to cover up.

=== Nancy Reagan biography ===
In 1991, Kelley published Nancy Reagan: The Unauthorized Biography. She was paid $3.5 million to write the book. The book claimed that Nancy Reagan had had affairs with Frank Sinatra, that she frequently relied on astrology, that she had lied about her age, and that she had a very poor relationship with her children, even alleging that she hit her daughter, Patti.

The book alleges that the future first lady "was renowned in Hollywood for performing oral sex... not only in the evening but in offices. That was one of the reasons that she was very popular on the MGM lot" became a minor internet meme.

According to Newsweek, "Despite her wretched excesses, Kelley has the core of the story right. Even her staunchest defenders concede that Nancy Reagan is more Marie Antoinette than Mother Teresa." However Newsweek also criticized the book's basic factual accuracy, noting that Kelley had reported that Ronald Reagan had allegedly date raped a 19-year-old, when the accuser would have actually been 25 at the time. The book included an interview with actress Jacquelyn Park, who detailed an alleged affair with Ronald Reagan in the 1950s.

Former President Ronald Reagan issued a statement saying the book "has no basis in fact and serves no decent purpose."

Michael Korda, who had been the editor for Kelley's previous book on Elizabeth Taylor, asked to excuse himself from this work as he was slated to edit Ronald Reagan's autobiography. The Nancy Reagan book was edited instead by Alice Mayhew. Korda stated that Nancy Reagan was purported to have said about Kelley, "I hope she gets hit by a truck."

=== British royal family and the Bush family ===
In September 1997, Kelley wrote The Royals (Warner Books, New York, ISBN 0-446-51712-7) about the British royal family. Kelley stated that the Windsors obscured their German ancestry and described scandals surrounding the members of the royal family.

The Family: The Real Story of the Bush Dynasty was published in September 2004. Kelley announced plans for the book shortly after George W. Bush's election in 2000 and worked on it for four years.

=== Oprah Winfrey biography ===
In December 2006, Crown announced it would publish Kelley's unauthorized biography of Oprah Winfrey. The book, Oprah: A Biography, was released on April 13, 2010. The New Yorker declared the biography "one of those King Kong vs. Godzilla events in celebrity culture." Oprah dismissed the book as a "so-called biography."

=== Capturing Camelot ===
Kelley's most recent book, Capturing Camelot: Stanley Tretick's Iconic Images of the Kennedys, was published by Thomas Dunne Books in November 2012.

== Criticism ==
Barbara Walters said books like Kelley's are more focused on salacious rather than factual content. The New York Times claimed that Kelley "just aims for the jugular." Time magazine reported that most journalists believe Kelley "too frequently fails to bring perspective or analysis to the fruits of her reporting and at times lards her work with dollops of questionable inferences and innuendos." Joe Klein described Kelley as a "professional sensationalist."

Michael Crowley of Slate magazine once called Kelley "the consummate gossip monger, a vehicle for all the rumor and innuendo surrounding her illustrious subjects." Kelley maintains, "I am an unabashed admirer of transparency and believe in the freedom guaranteed by the First Amendment" and, to that end, her writing is about "moving an icon out of the moonlight and into the sunlight." Crowley, while conceding that Kelley's books, in particular her Sinatra biography, have revealed core truths not addressed by more sympathetic biographers, has also stated that her investigative methods are questionable, and many of the claims in her books have been falsified, as with her 1990 People magazine story about John F. Kennedy and organized crime boss Sam Giancana, and her Nancy Reagan biography. Similar criticism has been leveled at her by Janet Maslin of The New York Times and Joe Klein of Time magazine.

== Other work ==
Kelley is on the board of Washington Independent Review of Books. In 2008 she was on the board of Healthy Women.

== Awards and honors ==
Kelley won the 2005 PEN Oakland Censorship Award and the Outstanding Author Award from the American Society of Journalists and Authors for her "courageous writing on popular culture." She received the Medal of Merit from the Lotos Club of New York City.

== Bibliography ==
=== Books ===
- Jackie Oh!: An Intimate Biography (1978)
- Elizabeth Taylor: The Last Star (1981)
- His Way: Unauthorised Biography of Frank Sinatra (1986)
- Nancy Reagan: The Unauthorised Biography (1991)
- The Royals (1997)
- The Family: The Real Story of the Bush Dynasty (2004)
- Oprah: A Biography (2010)
- Capturing Camelot: Stanley Tretick's Iconic Images of the Kennedys (2012)

=== Essays and reporting ===
- "Reconciliation". The Talk of the Town. On Campus. The New Yorker. 95 (13): 24–25. May 20, 2019.
