= The Family: The Real Story of the Bush Dynasty =

2004 book by Kitty Kelley

- First edition
- Author: Kitty Kelley
- Language: English
- Genre: Biography
- Published: 2004 (Doubleday)
- Publication place: United States
- Pages: 736
- ISBN: 978-0385503242
- OCLC: 56471745
- LC Class: E747 .K45 2004b

The Family: The Real Story of the Bush Dynasty is an unauthorized biography of the Bush family by the American investigative journalist Kitty Kelley. It was published on September 14, 2004, less than two months before the 2004 US Presidential election. Reviews of the book were mixed, with some of the "accusations," according to The New York Times, "[standing] up better than others."

Glynn Wilson, who failed to graduate yet falsely claimed to be professor of journalism at the University of Tennessee and who, in the aftermath of Hurricane Katrina, falsely claimed to have been the New Orleans Bureau Chief of The Dallas Morning News (no such bureau existed), was a free-lance journalist from Alabama, who sued Kelley for plagiarism claiming passages from the book contained the exact wording as an online article he had written. Wilson subsequently withdrew the infringement suit, first filed in Federal District Court in Birmingham. In an interview with The New York Times, Wilson indicated he withdrew because he was likely to lose the suit. Wilson also agreed not to refile his claim. According to The New York Times, Wilson received no monetary settlement from Kelley or the publisher.
