= Decision Points =

2010 memoir by George W. Bush

- Author: George W. Bush
- Language: English
- Genre: Memoir
- Publisher: Crown Publishing Group
- Publication date: November 9, 2010
- Publication place: United States
- Pages: 497
- ISBN: 978-0-307-59061-9
- Dewey Decimal: 973.931092
- LC Class: E903 .A3 2010
- Preceded by: A Charge to Keep
- Followed by: 41: A Portrait of My Father

Decision Points is a memoir by George W. Bush, the 43rd president of the United States. It was released on November 9, 2010, and the release was accompanied by national television appearances and a national tour. The book surpassed sales of two million copies less than two months after its release, breaking the record previously held by former President Bill Clinton's memoir My Life. Decision Points also opened at #1 on the New York Times bestseller list.

== Content ==
Bush's 481-page memoir is broken up into 14 chapters. The first two chapters are about his life before the presidency. The first chapter is about notable events in his earlier life such as his decision to quit drinking in 1986. The second chapter is about his decision to run for Governor of Texas, and then President of the United States. The remaining twelve chapters are about events during his presidency: the September 11, 2001 terrorist attacks, the wars in Iraq and Afghanistan, aid to developing countries, the Iraq troop surge of 2007, domestic issues (including Medicare Part D, Social Security reform, No Child Left Behind, and Immigration reform), the federal response to Hurricane Katrina, embryonic stem cell research, and the 2008 financial crisis. He wrote with the research assistance of former White House Deputy Director of Speechwriting Christopher Michel. Bush gives extensive detail about the specific issues covered in the book, explaining the process behind arriving at a decision and why he made it. Immigration reform was a notable policy failure of Bush's that he laments has not been adequately dealt with in subsequent years.

In the book, Bush described his moral dilemma over stem-cell research. He extensively consulted members of his administration about the pros and cons of the issue, learning about the benefits of stem-cell research while trying to find ways to avoid encouraging abortions. He likened his concern of the wrong application of the policy to the Aldous Huxley novel Brave New World. Bush writes that his decision to only use existing lines has been vindicated by recent successful research undertaken with non-embryonic stem cells.

Bush also talked about the 2000 election in detail and mentioned that he thought he had lost until Karl Rove called to say that Florida was too close to call. The closeness of the election led to the 36-day legal battle over Florida and its 25 electoral votes. Bush was eventually declared the winner when the Supreme Court stopped a court ordered recount in a controversial 5–4 decision on December 8, 2000. Bush notably did not mention losing the popular vote but did make note of the controversy surrounding the election, including the presence of protesters at his 2001 inauguration.

Bush also discusses his decision to send troops to Iraq, initially and again in 2007, arguing that Saddam Hussein's refusal to comply with the United Nations needed to end, as well as arguing that failure to send more troops to Iraq in 2007 could have resulted in a situation similar to the Vietnam War. In Afghanistan, he noted the difficulties of capturing former Al-Qaeda leader Osama bin Laden. He states that a few months before the end of his term his administration planned a strategy of sending more troops to Afghanistan and increasing drone strikes on Pakistan. He felt it was best to wait until his successor took office for the U.S. military to employ this strategy.

Bush explains how he had to have long conversations with some Republican members of Congress, during the 2008 financial crisis, who were reluctant to support the bailout. Bush expressed to them his anger that the government had to take such a drastic measure but reminded them that he is supporting the bailout because he felt a risk of an economic depression was not worth taking.

Bush expressed his views of the 2008 election. He stated that he was disappointed that 2008 U.S. Republican presidential candidate John McCain was reluctant to campaign with him and he believed that he could have helped McCain. He referenced Barack Obama several times, but positively and without criticism.

He wrote about his backward-looking last days in office,

I reflected on everything we were facing. Over the past few weeks we had seen the failure of America's two largest mortgage entities, the bankruptcy of a major investment bank, the sale of another, the nationalization of the world's largest insurance company, and now the most drastic intervention in the free market since the presidency of Franklin Roosevelt. At the same time, Russia had invaded and occupied Georgia, Hurricane Ike had hit Texas, and America was fighting a two-front war in Iraq and Afghanistan. This was one ugly way to end the presidency.

== Advance and publicity campaign ==
Bush has stated that he began writing the book the day after he left office. He was paid $7 million for the first 1.5 million copies.

In tandem with book-publication appearances, Bush hosted a November 16 groundbreaking ceremony for the George W. Bush Presidential Center at Southern Methodist University in Dallas. The event gathered some 2,500 guests, including hundreds of former administration officials. Former Vice President Dick Cheney said at the event, "When times have been tough or the critics have been loud, you've always said you had faith in history's judgment, and history is beginning to come around." In turn, Bush said of the recently hospitalized Cheney, "He was a great vice president of the United States, and I'm proud to call him friend."

== Reactions ==
Reaction to the book began far in advance of its earliest release, even a sneak peek at a draft, as reported by Tim Dowling of The Guardian in April 2010, six months before its publication. Quotations from the draft were published without comment, except for proposed cover pictures for the book.

The New York Times' Peter Baker, who was given an advance copy of the book, assessed Bush's political standing as the book release rolled out in appearances with Oprah Winfrey, Matt Lauer, and Candy Crowley.

At the same time as Baker, on the Times opinion pages columnist Maureen Dowd focused unfavorably on repeated instances in the book of Bush feeling "blindsided" but concluded that while his "decision-making leaves something to be desired, his story-telling is good." To illustrate the last point, Dowd recounted the story in which Vladimir Putin had bragged that his black Labrador, Koni, was "[b]igger, stronger, and faster than Barney." Stephen Harper later "drolly noted [to Bush], 'You're lucky he only showed you his dog.'"

Journalist Tim Rutten wrote for the Los Angeles Times recommending the book, which he found "unexpectedly engrossing" and better "than many of his detractors expected." Rutten particularly highlighted Bush's expressed concerns about faulty intelligence on Saddam Hussein's pursuit of weapons of mass destruction as well as Bush's regrets about the Hurricane Katrina. Seeing a "disarming candor" combined with an "almost alarming off-handedness about the implications of what's being said", Rutten compared Bush's attitudes to the characters in Shakespeare's Macbeth.

The former Chancellor of Germany, Gerhard Schröder, stated, "The former American president is not telling the truth." He was referring to Bush's allegation that Schröder had promised to support the 2003 invasion of Iraq. Schröder responded that he had promised only that he would support action against Iraq if Iraq were found to have been involved in the September 11 attacks. "This connection, however, as it became clear during 2002, was false and constructed."

The Daily Telegraph ran a negative review by journalist Mick Brown. Brown remarked that "Bush is no great literary stylist" and that the "writing seldom rises above the workmanlike" while some "language is distinctly odd." Brown stated that Bush comes across as "likeable", but Brown concluded that "conspicuously absent from this book is any acknowledgement, or even honest appraisal, of the larger failings of his presidency".

Journalist Michael Barone wrote for National Review praising Bush for admitting to "serious errors up front". Barone cited Bush's statement that he should have stayed in Baton Rouge, Louisiana and deployed active-duty troops quickly in order to assist Hurricane Katrina victims as well as Bush's admission that he failed to see the "house of cards" in America's financial sector.

== See also ==
- List of autobiographies by presidents of the United States
- A Journey by Tony Blair
- Spoken from the Heart by Laura Bush
- Known and Unknown: A Memoir by Donald Rumsfeld
- At the Center of the Storm: My Years at the CIA by George Tenet
- In My Time: A Personal and Political Memoir by Dick Cheney
