= 41: A Portrait of My Father =

Book by George W. Bush

- Author: George W. Bush
- Language: English
- Publisher: Crown Publishers (2014)
- Publication date: November 11, 2014
- Publication place: United States
- Media type: Print
- Pages: 304
- ISBN: 978-0553447781
- Preceded by: Decision Points
- Followed by: Portraits of Courage

41: A Portrait of My Father is a 2014 book written by George W. Bush for his father George H. W. Bush. The book was released on November 11, 2014. The book was reviewed in The New York Times, the Financial Times, The Wall Street Journal, The Times, The Washington Post, among others.

== Overview ==
George W. Bush reflects on his relationship with his father, detailing George H. W. Bush's early life and role as a parent as it intersected with his presidency. Insight into the death of Pauline Robinson Bush is also provided, as is the Bush family's reaction.
