= A Charge to Keep =

Book by George W. Bush

- Author: George W. Bush
- Language: English
- Genre: Memoir
- Published: 1999 (Morrow)
- Publication place: United States
- Media type: Print
- Pages: 253
- ISBN: 0-688-17441-8
- OCLC: 42719865
- Dewey Decimal: 976.4063092
- LC Class: F391.4.B87 A3
- Followed by: Decision Points

A Charge to Keep is a 1999 book written by then-Governor of Texas George W. Bush, with a foreword by Karen Hughes. Later editions have the sub-title My Journey To The White House.

== Overview ==
The book contains a brief overview of Bush's life and political philosophy. It is not an autobiography in the strict sense, but rather a collection of non-chronological sketches and anecdotes about his years at Yale and Harvard, business career, and time as governor of Texas. He intersperses these with brief explanations of his political philosophy, including his belief in small government, capitalism, and a strong national defense.

More specific parts of his program, which he enumerates in the last pages, include creating a free market alliance with Canada and Latin America, privatizing Social Security, and firmness with non-aligned regimes, particularly Iraq and North Korea (pp. 238–9). Frank Bruni, writing in the New York Times, described the book as containing only few revelations, among them Bush's account of his decision not to grant a stay of execution for Karla Faye Tucker, which he described as affecting him emotionally, contrary to media criticism at the time.

Ghostwriter Michael Herskowitz was hired in 1999 to draft the book, but he was dismissed and Hughes took over after "the early chapters Herskowitz submitted were judged to overemphasize W.'s early difficulties, describing him, for instance, as having been unsuccessful in the oil business."

The proceeds of the book were donated to charity.

== Origin of the title ==
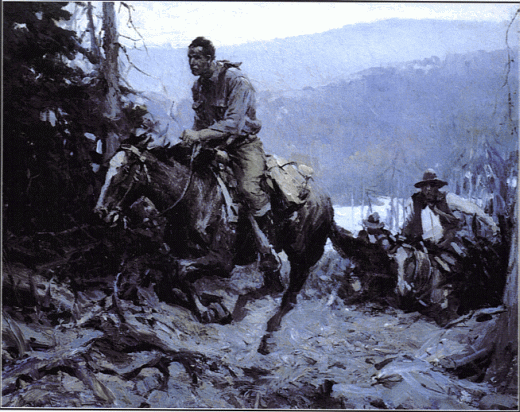
A Charge to Keep (W.H.D. Koerner)

The title of the book comes from the hymn, "A Charge to Keep I Have" (1762) by Charles Wesley. Wesley's title is a paraphrase of Leviticus 8:35: "keep the charge of the LORD, so that you may not die."

A painting by W.H.D. Koerner, lent to Bush, shows a horseman charging up a rugged mountain trail, followed by others. In the book, Bush says this scene "epitomizes our mission":

When you come into my office, please take a look at the beautiful painting of a horseman determinedly charging up what appears to be a steep and rough trail. This is us. What adds complete life to the painting for me is the message of Charles Wesley that we serve One greater than ourselves.

The painting hung on the west wall of the Oval Office during Bush's presidency. He has explained to journalists that its title is "based upon a religious hymn. The hymn talks about serving God." The phrase "A Charge to Keep" was attached to the painting because it was used to illustrate a short story of this title by Ben Ames Williams published in 1918 by Country Gentleman magazine. According to Jacob Weisberg, Bush "came to believe that the picture depicted the circuit-riders who spread Methodism across the Alleghenies in the nineteenth century. In other words, the cowboy who looked like Bush was a missionary of his own denomination."

== Contents ==
- Foreword
- Reflections by Karen Hughes
1. A Charge to Keep
2. Midland Values
3. "What Texans Can Dream, Texans Can Do"
4. Yale and the National Guard
5. Harvard and Moving Home
6. Reading: The New Civil Right
7. The Best Decision I Ever Made
8. Naming the Team
9. Working Together
10. The Big 4-0
11. Karla Faye Tucker and Henry Lee Lucas
12. Tides
13. The Veto
14. Baseball
15. A Time to Build
16. A Compassionate Conservative

== See also ==
- Decision Points
