= George W. Bush Presidential Center =

Presidential library and museum in University Park, Texas

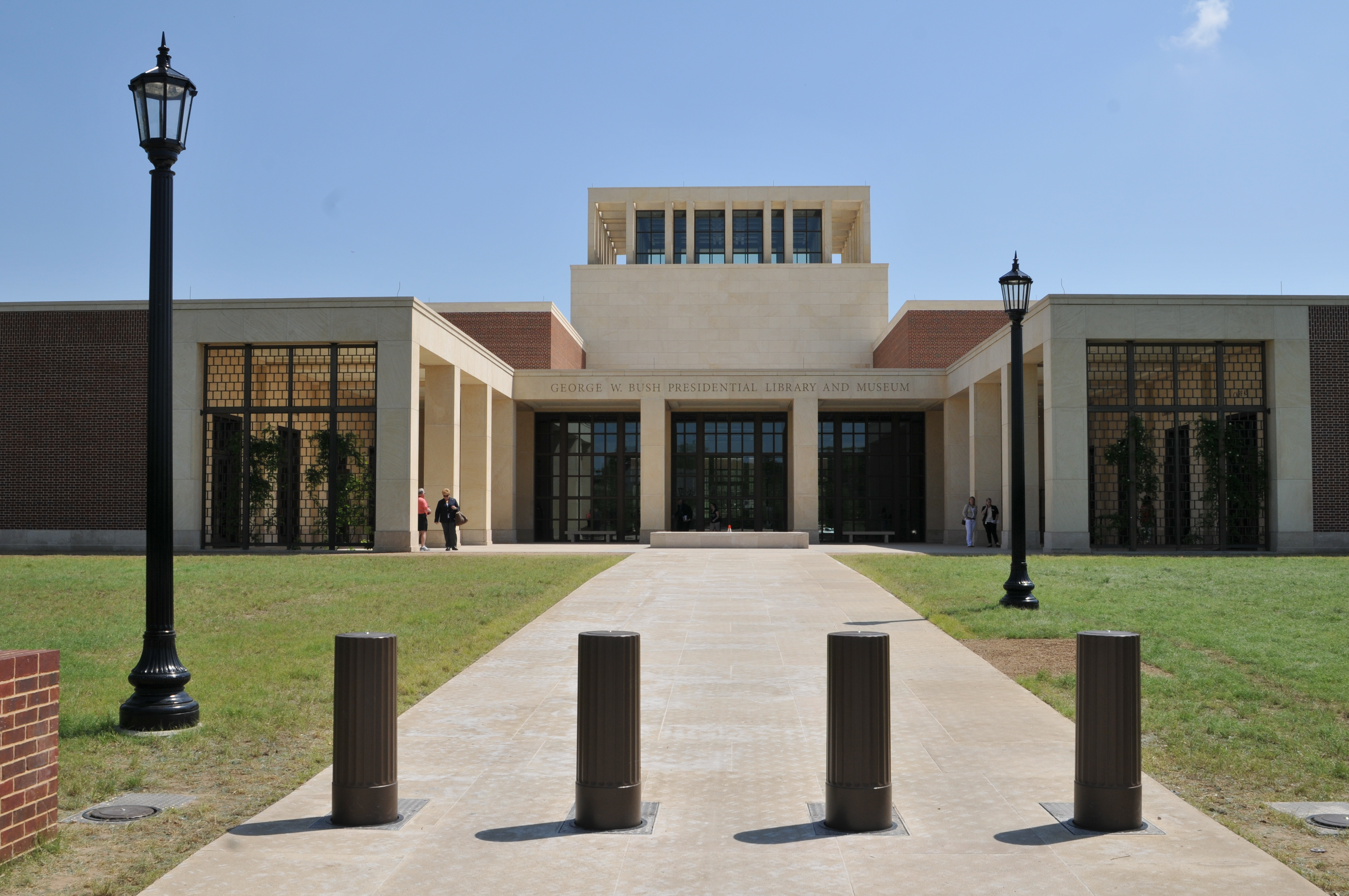
- The George W. Bush Presidential Center in 2013

- Location within Texas Location within the United States

General information
- Architectural style: New Classical
- Location: 2943 SMU Boulevard, Dallas, TX 75205, United States - Southern Methodist University
- Coordinates: 32°50′27″N 96°46′41″W
- Named for: George W. Bush
- Construction started: November 16, 2010; 15 years ago
- Completed: April 25, 2013; 13 years ago

Technical details
- Size: 207,000 square feet (19,200 m^{2})

Design and construction
- Architect: Robert A.M. Stern Architects

Website
- www.bushcenter.org

The George W. Bush Presidential Center, which opened on April 25, 2013, is a complex that includes the presidential library and museum of George W. Bush, 43rd United States president (2001-2009), the George W. Bush Policy Institute, and the offices of the George W. Bush Foundation. It is located on the campus of Southern Methodist University (SMU) in University Park, Texas, near Dallas. The library holds over 1,200 cubic feet of audiovisual materials, including approximately 4 million photographs related to Bush's presidency. It was selected to be the eventual burial location of Bush and his wife, Laura Bush.

== History ==
=== Site selection process ===
==== Early bidders ====
Before Bush became president, officials at Baylor University in Waco, Texas, started to work on a bid for the library. They believed that their proximity to his ranch in Crawford and their location within 100 miles (160 km) of Austin, Dallas, and the Bryan-College Station metropolitan area gave them a good shot at winning such a project. Not long after Bush became president, officials at Southern Methodist University (SMU) began working on their bid for the library.

The White House refused to discuss the issue until after Bush had won a second term. In the latter part of 2005, the White House asked a total of six colleges and one city to submit bids for the library. The six were Baylor, SMU, the University of Texas System, Texas Tech University, the University of Dallas, and Midland College. The city of Arlington, Texas, also submitted a bid. A few weeks later, Midland College announced it was merging its bid with Texas Tech to form a "West Texas Coalition" to win the library and museum. Part of the proposal was to create a Laura Bush reading center at Midland College while the main presidential library and museum would be housed on the Lubbock campus of Texas Tech.

==== Details of potential sites ====
Each of the groups had benefits and drawbacks to their bids. Arlington had land to offer near the stadiums for the Dallas Cowboys and Texas Rangers. It was in the middle of an area that already draws a large number of tourists every year. The lack of school involvement was a large drawback to the proposal, even though the University of Texas at Arlington assisted the city in making the bid.

Baylor University had substantial land to offer on the banks of the Brazos River in Waco. The downside was that Baylor is not in a major metropolitan area and would probably not attract nearly as many visitors annually as the library would if it were built somewhere in the Dallas area.

Many on the campus of the UT System opposed the school's bid for the library; for example, The Daily Texan, the student newspaper of the UT system's university, the University of Texas at Austin, printed an editorial against the project. On the plus side, UT Austin was already home to the Lyndon Baines Johnson Library and Museum and had experience in managing such a project. The drawback was the proposal to split the library up over several UT campuses around the state. This decentralized approach was sold as a way to create a "virtual" library that would benefit far more people.

The UT system also submitted with its bid a downtown property under its ownership as well as offering the UT Dallas campus. The Downtown Dallas property was located close to the Sixth Floor Museum at Dealey Plaza, which attracts a large number of tourists already and was located far away from residential areas, which would prevent complaints about congestion. It would also help rejuvenate the central downtown area, which had been facing a flight of businesses and development towards the uptown areas. However, the idea of the UT system running the museum itself was found unfavorable. UT Dallas in Richardson, traditionally considered an engineering school and one of the youngest universities in the UT System, was in the middle of large developments to its campus. It had a growing governmental studies and business program whose faculty was supportive of the bid. It was also located north of Dallas near the fast developing communities of Frisco and Plano. However, the UT Dallas administration was uninterested in being in the business of running a museum. Additionally conflicts as to where the museum would be located (the UT System wanted to use land that the UT Dallas administration had set aside for the future construction of residential halls and a research building) led to the UT System withdrawing its proposal.

Texas Tech also had a substantial amount of land to offer and a supportive faculty and student body. The drawback to Texas Tech's bid was that the school is located in Lubbock, again outside a major metro area.

The University of Dallas (UD), a private Catholic school in the Dallas suburb of Irving, is not well known outside of the Dallas-Fort Worth metropolitan area. An advantage for UD was that the school owned hundreds of acres of undeveloped land next to its campus that lies between several major highways and a future light rail station. Its plans were apparently big enough to include a proposal to use some land from the City of Dallas, a fact that led then Dallas Mayor Laura Miller to endorse this plan over SMU's bid.

SMU's bid was mired in mystery from the start, especially with regard to where SMU would find the land to build the facility. Over the course of planning, SMU bought dozens of homes and businesses adjacent to or near the school. SMU also acquired the University Gardens condos, only to be sued by one of the condo owners over the way the school made the acquisition. SMU insisted the land for the condos would not be needed for the library, yet space was still an issue. Many in University Park, an upscale enclave next to the campus, were also displeased with the prospect of thousands of people and tour buses going through their neighborhood to visit the library. Despite that, the University Park town council agreed to put up for a vote a plan to sell parkland to SMU for the library.

==== Final stages of selection ====
In late 2005, the White House announced that SMU, Baylor, UD, and Texas Tech had been selected as finalists to make their pitch to the library committee in Washington headed by the president's long time friend and former Commerce Secretary, Donald Evans. A few weeks after the presentations had been made, the committee announced that Texas Tech had been dropped from consideration, leaving only SMU, Baylor, and UD in contention.

On December 20, 2006, a judge ruled in favor of SMU on the land dispute over the University Gardens condos. The next day, officials at SMU and library selection committee members announced that the university had entered "the next phase of deliberations" towards final site selection for the library.

On January 22, 2007, UD withdrew its bid for the library due to the negotiations with SMU. UD revealed the ambitious plans it had for the library and museum that included a large park, jogging trails, waterfalls, and easy access to a light-rail station.

Baylor published sections of its proposal on the university website, but no new information was revealed, and Baylor announced that it would not publish the complete proposal until after the final site selection was announced.

==== Selection of SMU ====
On February 22, 2008, officials at Southern Methodist University reported that the final details of the agreement between the university and the Bush Foundation would be finalized, clearing the way for an official announcement that the George W. Bush Library would be built at SMU. The university soon officially confirmed the signed agreement.

Some segments of the SMU community had voiced opposition to the project during the selection phase. In December 2006, a letter from several members of the Perkins School of Theology to R. Gerald Turner, president of the Board of Trustees, criticized Bush's policies as "ethically egregious" and expressed concern that the library would serve as a "conservative think tank and policy institute that engages in legacy polishing and grooms young conservatives for public office". Another group of faculty complained about the lack of consultation in the decision to house the library on campus. According to SMU officials, opposition among faculty members has not been widespread.

A group of Methodists launched a petition opposing plans to build the library and museum at SMU, calling it inappropriate to link Bush's presidency to a university bearing the Methodist name.

An article in The Guardian noted that a petition opposing the construction of the library gathered 12,500 signatures.

=== Fundraising ===
The nonprofit George W. Bush Foundation in early 2009 had a goal to raise $300 million for construction and endowment of the library, according to its president Mark Langdale.

=== Construction and sustainability ===
The firm of architect and Driehaus Prize winner Robert A.M. Stern, dean of the architecture school at Yale University, was picked to design the library.

Groundbreaking took place on November 16, 2010. In tandem with the publication of his memoir Decision Points, Bush hosted a November 16, 2010, groundbreaking ceremony for the center. At the event, Dick Cheney commented that "this may be the only shovel ready project in America", using a term prominently and ultimately ruefully associated with President Barack Obama's 2009 fiscal stimulus package. The library foundation chose the Manhattan Construction Company as contractor, which had also built the George H.W. Bush Presidential Library.

The construction of the center was projected to cost $250 million. In April 2013, the building earned a Leadership in Energy and Environmental Design (LEED) Platinum green building certification, the highest possible.

Some of the sustainable features of The George W. Bush Presidential Center include that the site was built using the same fill from the excavation and there is a dynamic vegetative bioswale for storm water management. Over 90 native Texan plant species were used, 900 native trees and over 350,000 plant plugs were planted.

Environmentally, the lawn achieves a biomass density index 62% higher than a classic lawn. It also reduces potable water consumption for irrigation 75% more than the average baseline.

=== Completion and dedication ceremony ===
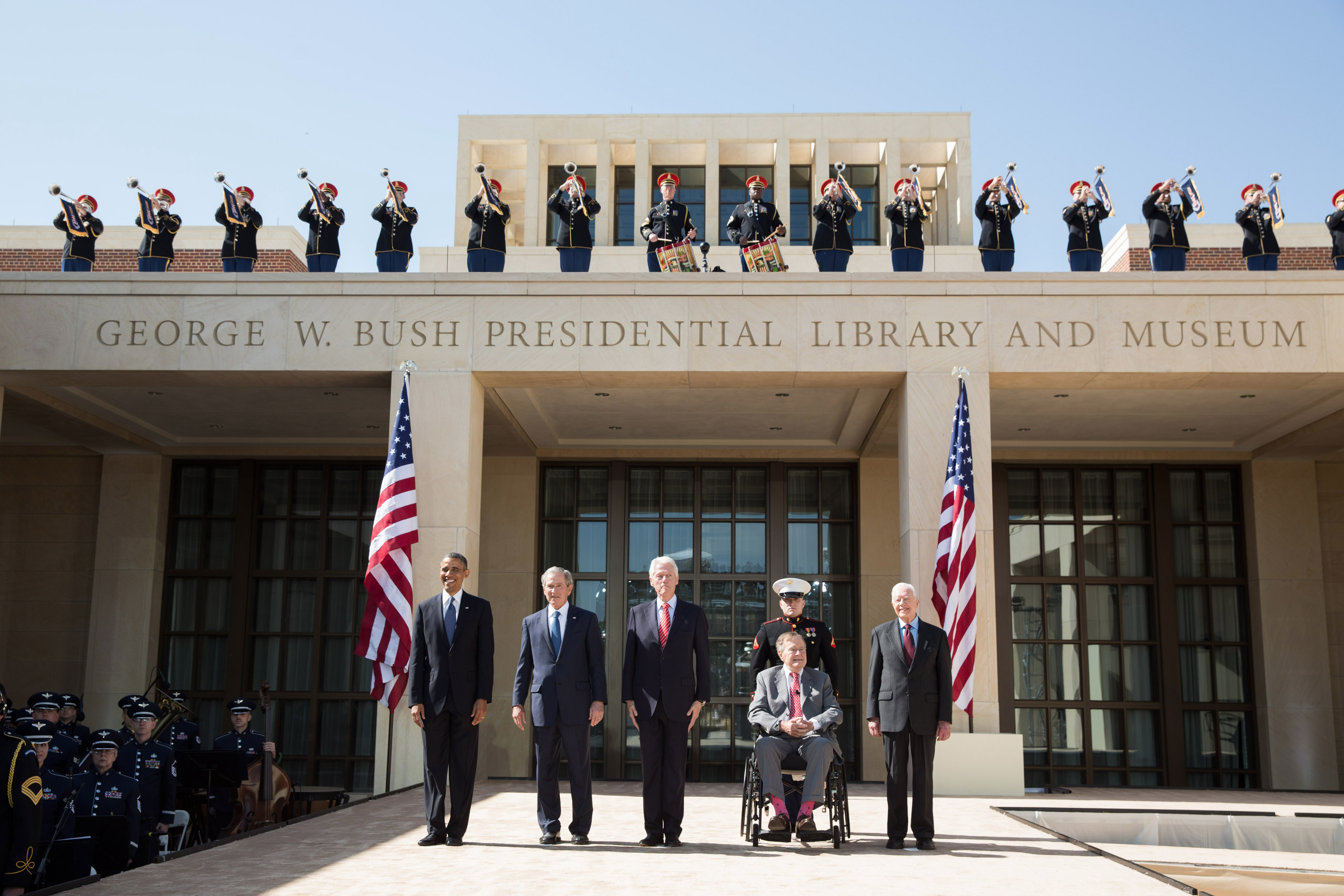
At the dedication of the center in April 2013, the five then-living former or current U.S. presidents (from left): Obama, George W. Bush, Clinton, George H. W. Bush, and Carter

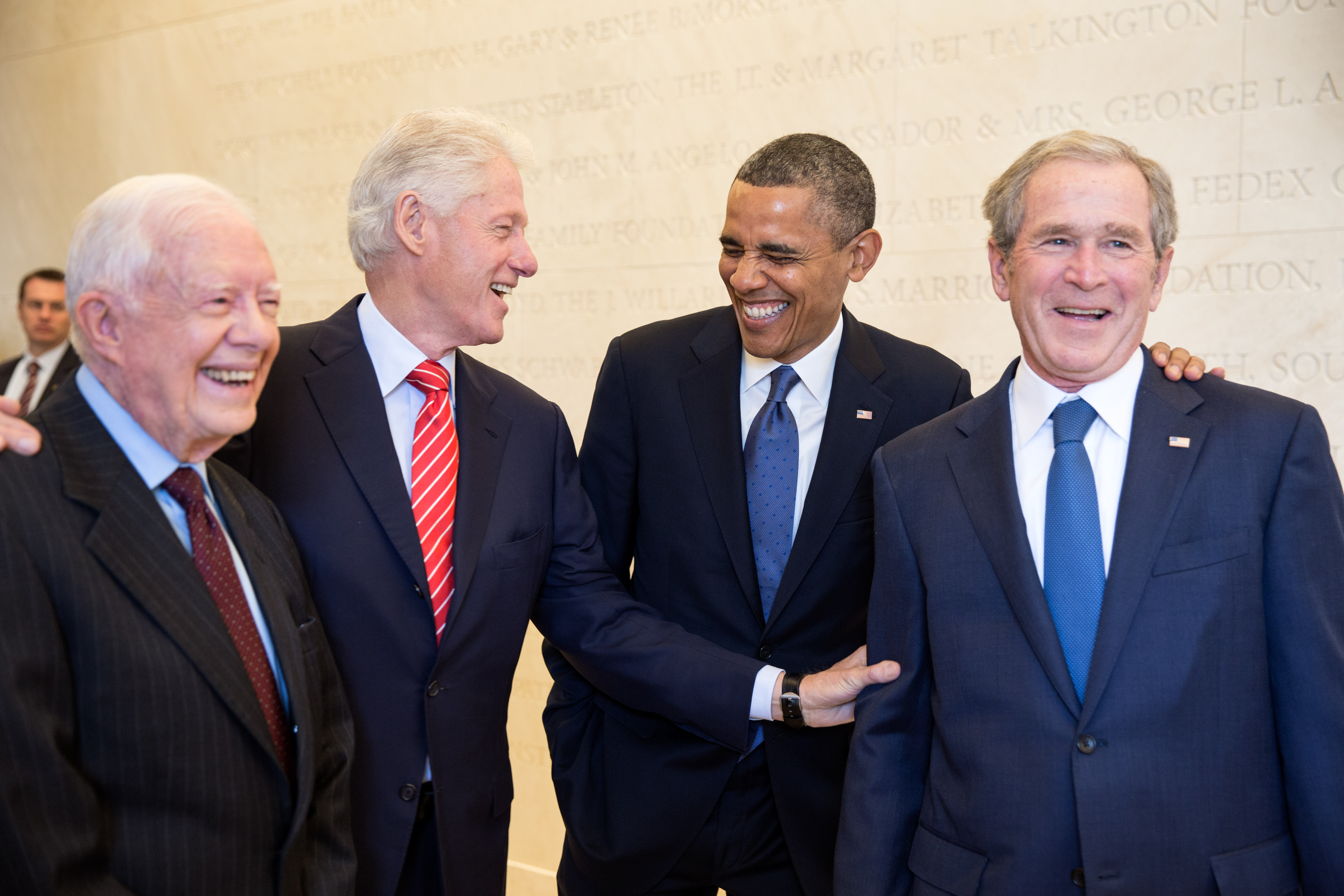
Presidents Carter, Clinton, Obama, and George W. Bush

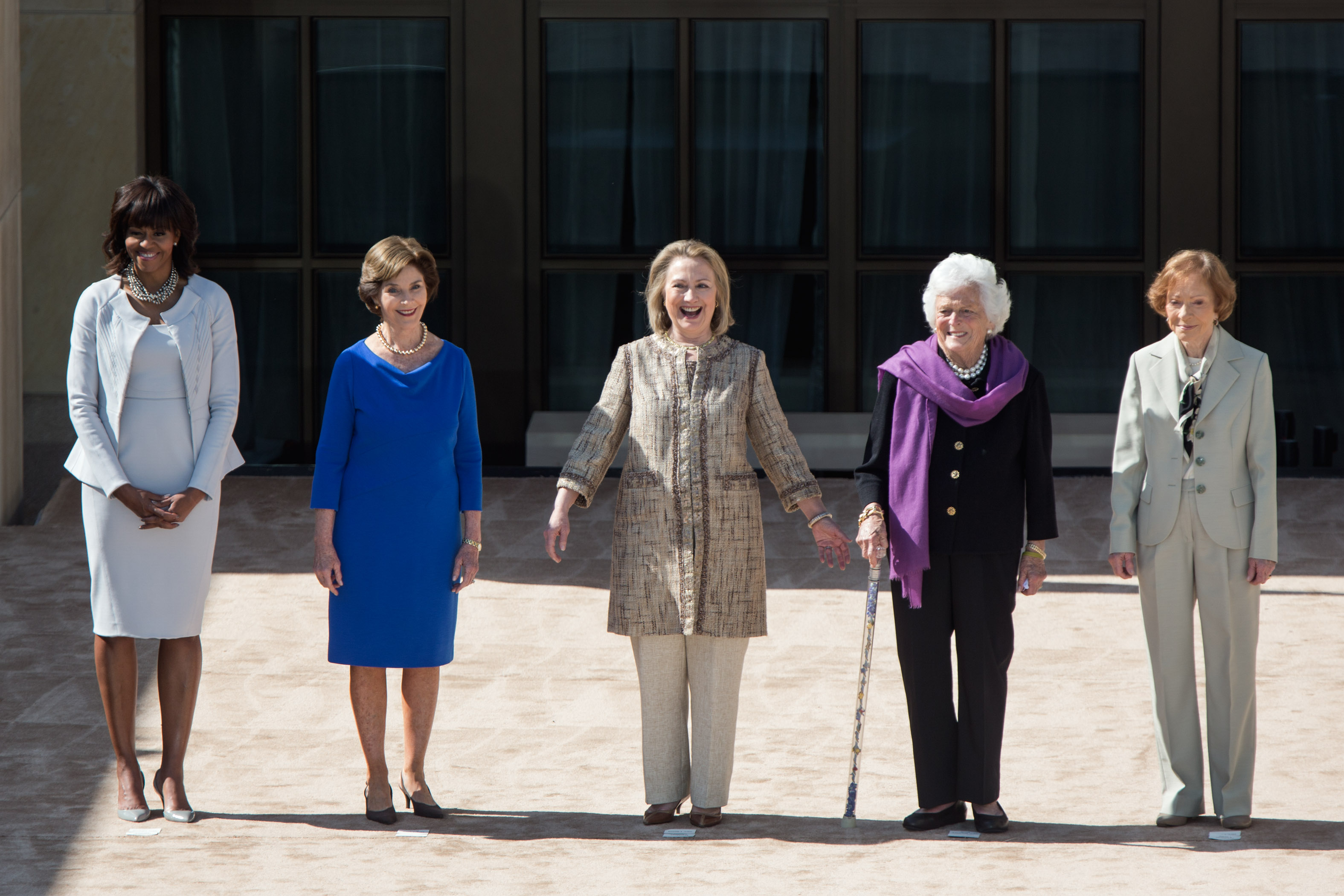
The First Ladies in reverse chronological order Michelle Obama, Laura Bush, Hillary Clinton, Barbara Bush, and Rosalynn Carter at the dedication of the center, April 2013

The center which includes a presidential library, museum, institute and the offices of the George W. Bush Foundation was dedicated on April 25, 2013, in a ceremony which featured all living former U.S. presidents: Jimmy Carter, George H. W. Bush, Bill Clinton and George W. Bush, and then-current president Barack Obama. The library and museum are privately administered by the National Archives and Records Administration, while the university holds representation on the institute board. The project raised over $500 million for the construction and endowment of the George W. Bush Presidential Center.

The previous time that George W. Bush (then the outgoing president), Obama (then the president-elect), Clinton, George H. W. Bush, and Carter all met took place in the White House in January 2009, just days ahead of Obama's first inauguration.

Also in attendance were current and former US politicians and over 10,000 other invited guests, including dignitaries and ambassadors from about fifty countries. They included:

- Secretary General Anders Fogh Rasmussen from NATO
- Crown Prince Mohammad bin Salman of Saudi Arabia
- Prince Salman Al Khalifa of Bahrain
- President Mikheil Saakashvili and Mrs. Sandra Roelofs from Georgia
- Former prime minister José María Aznar from Spain
- Former prime minister and Mrs. Ehud Olmert from Israel
- Former prime minister and Mrs. John Howard from Australia
- Former president Lee Myung-bak and Mrs. Kim Yoon-ok from South Korea
- Former prime minister Tony Blair and Mrs. Cherie Blair from the United Kingdom
- Former prime minister Silvio Berlusconi from Italy
- Former president John Kufuor from Ghana
- Former president Francisco Guillermo Flores Pérez and Mrs. Lourdes Rodríguez de Flores from El Salvador

=== Ownership transfer ===
On November 16, 2022, the National Archives and Records Administration (NARA) transferred operations of the museum to the George W. Bush Foundation effective January 1, 2023. The transfer was originally agreed to in April 2022 but was paused due to concerns about whitewashing exhibits about controversial topics, an issue which has plagued non-NARA museums like the Richard Nixon Presidential Library and Museum. To alleviate this, the foundation is required to obtain NARA and historian input, clearly designate foundation and NARA spaces, and NARA will retain all ownership of presidential artifacts which are considered loaned to the foundation for display.

=== Operations ===
It was announced in August 2019 that the Center would be the eventual burial site of George W. and Laura Bush.

== Presidential library ==
At 207,000 square feet (19,200 m^{2}), it is the second-largest presidential library, behind only the Ronald Reagan Presidential Library in Simi Valley, California. Like most presidential libraries it includes a full-size replica of the Oval Office and the Resolute Desk where visitors may have their pictures taken with. Particular focus is made on Bush's decisions after the September 11, 2001 terrorist attacks, and includes artifacts from the event. Another section include "Decision Points" interactive exhibits about key events in his presidency, the title taken from Bush's memoir. Other exhibits include Hurricane Katrina and the 2008 financial crisis, and a collection of items from first ladies of the United States. A temporary exhibit hall has rotating exhibits from American history. Bush's paintings are also exhibited in the museum. There is a 14 acre native garden adjacent to the site dedicated to Laura Bush, and a farm-to-table restaurant, Café 43.

== Policy institute ==
Ambassador James K. Glassman, a former State Department official, was appointed founding executive director of the center's George W. Bush Institute in September 2009, and held that position until 2013. It will be an "action-oriented think tank" independent of SMU.

The institute is planned "to advance four causes he adopted as his own while in office: human freedom, global health, economic growth and education reform". He has also started a women's initiative led by his wife, Laura, as well as a military service initiative to help US veterans. At the November 2010, groundbreaking, the former president said to attendees, "The decisions of governing are on another president's desk, and he deserves to make them without criticism from me. But staying out of current affairs and politics does not mean staying out of policy." Laura Bush addressed the crowd "to promote the importance of fighting for women's rights around the world."

In 2012, it published The 4% Solution: Unleashing the Economic Growth America Needs (Crown Business, 2012), a collection of essays. Five Nobel Prize winners contributed. The presentation was broadcast five times on Book TV between August and December 2012. The book contains a foreword by George W. Bush, and covers immigration, Social Security, tax policy, and energy policy. It suggests policies for the U.S. gross domestic product annual growth to reach 4%. When President Donald Trump proposed repeal of NAFTA in 2017, Matthew Rooney, the director of the economic growth initiative at the Bush Institute defended NAFTA on multiple fronts but suggested an update is needed.

In early 2018, the Bush Institute received two $10 million endowments, one each from Boeing and Highland Capital Management, in support of the institute's programs.

== See also ==
- Presidential Records Act
- George H.W. Bush Presidential Library and Museum
- Presidential memorials in the United States
