= Bibliography of George H. W. Bush =

This is a list of books by or about George H. W. Bush.

== By Bush ==
- Looking Forward: An Autobiography, (1988), ISBN 978-0553277913
- A World Transformed, (1998), cowritten with Brent Scowcroft, ISBN 978-0679432487
- All the Best: My Life in Letters and Other Writings, (1999), ISBN 978-1501106675

== About Bush ==
- Tarpley, Webster Griffin; Chaitkin, Anton (1992). George Bush : the unauthorized biography. Washington, D.C.: Executive Intelligence Review. ISBN 9780943235059.
- George Bush: The Life of a Lone Star Yankee (1997)
- Kelley, Kitty, The Family: The Real Story of the Bush Dynasty (2004), ISBN 978-1400096411
- Bush, George Walker, 41: A Portrait of My Father, (2014), ISBN 978-0553447781
- Meacham Jon, Destiny and Power: The American Odyssey of George Herbert Walker Bush, (2015), ISBN 978-1400067657
- White House Usher: Stories from the Inside, by Christopher Emery (2017), ISBN 978-1634926560
