= Bibliography of George Bush =

Bibliography of George Bush may refer to:

- Bibliography of George H. W. Bush
- Bibliography of George W. Bush
- George Bush (biblical scholar)#Published works
