= Timeline of the George H. W. Bush presidency (1992–1993) =

The following is a timeline of the presidency of George H. W. Bush, from January 1, 1992 to January 20, 1993.

== January 1992 ==
- January 1 – President Bush answers questions on relations between the United States and Australia, trade issues, New Year's resolutions, and his schedule during the morning. President Bush attends the dedication ceremony for the American gallery at the Australian National Maritime Museum in Sydney during the evening.
- January 2 – President Bush delivers an address to the Australian Parliament in Canberra in the Parliament House during the afternoon. President Bush attends a dinner hosted by Prime Minister of Australia Paul Keating in the House of Representatives Chamber at Parliament House during the evening.
- January 4 – President Bush holds his one hundredth and sixteenth news conference with Prime Minister of Singapore Goh Chok Tong in the courtyard at Istana Palace during the morning. The two answer questions on relations between the US and Japan, the Command Task Force being relocated, American military spending, American military presence in the Pacific, trade between the United States and Asia, and Myanmar and Vietnam. President Bush delivers an address and answers questions on free and fair trade, America's role in the Pacific, and Europe at the Westin Stamford Hotel in Singapore during the afternoon.
- January 6 – President Bush delivers an address to American and Korean business groups at the Hotel Shilla in Seoul during the morning. President Bush gives a speech at the Korean National Assembly in Seoul at the National Assembly Hall during the afternoon.
- January 8 – President Bush falls ill during a state dinner with Prime Minister Kiichi Miyazawa of Japan, vomiting on Miyazawa.
- January 9 – United States Secretary of the Treasury Nicholas F. Brady delivers remarks to the Japanese Welcoming Committee Luncheon at the Akasaka Prince Hotel during the afternoon. President Bush holds his one hundred and eighteenth news conference at the Akasaka Palace with Prime Minister of Japan Kiichi Miyazawa during the afternoon. President Bush delivers an address at the start of the conference and the two answer questions on reporters on multilateral trade negotiations, relations between the United States and Japan, economic growth package, and his health.
- January 10 – President Bush gives a speech on the administration's drug policies to the President's Drug Advisory Council at the J.W. Marriott Hotel during the morning.
- January 13 – President Bush delivers an address to the American Farm Bureau Federation in the Municipal Auditorium in Kansas City, Missouri during the morning. The White House releases a statement confirming a meeting took place between President Bush and President of Portugal Mario Soares for discussions on relations between their two countries.
- January 14 – President Bush releases a statement on the death of Glenn Brenner. President Bush announces the appointment of Nicholas E. Calio for Assistant to the President for Legislative Affairs.
- January 15 – President Bush delivers an address to community leaders in Portsmouth, New Hampshire while at the Pease Air National Guard Base during the morning. President Bush delivers a speech to employees of Liberty Mutual Insurance in the cafeteria of the company building during the afternoon. President Bush gives an address to employees of Cabletron Systems in Rochester, New Hampshire during the afternoon. President Bush announces his appointment of D. Cameron Findlay for Deputy Assistant to the President and Counselor to the Chief of Staff.
- January 16 – President Bush issues a statement on the anniversary of Operation Desert Storm.
- January 17 – President Bush signs the proclamation of the Martin Luther King Jr. federal holiday while in Freedom Hall at the Dr. Martin Luther King Jr. Center during the morning. President Bush announces his nomination of William O. Studeman for Deputy Director of Central Intelligence.
- January 21 – President Bush delivers an address at the Emily Harris Head Start Center in Catonsville, Maryland during the morning. President Bush issues a memorandum on the subject of transportation of humanitarian assistance to the dissolved Soviet Union. Press Secretary Fitzwater releases a statement of President Bush's sympathy in response to the passing of Rose Bowen, the wife of former United States Secretary of Health and Human Services Otis Bowen.
- January 22 – President Bush holds his one hundred and nineteenth news conference in the Briefing Room during the morning. President Bush announces his nomination of Andrew H. Card for United States Secretary of Transportation at the start of the conference and answers questions from reporters on the commonwealth of independent states, economic growth initiatives, trade agreements between Japan and the United States, and the message of his upcoming State of the Union address.
- January 23 – President Bush gives an address to the National Association of Wholesaler-Distributors in Room 450 of the Old Executive Office Building during the morning. President Bush attends the presentation of the Senior Executive Service Awards during a morning appearance in Room 450 of the Old Executive Office Building. President Bush delivers a speech on environmental policies of the administration and answers questions from reporters on domestic initiatives and unemployment benefits during a morning appearance in the Oval Office.
- January 24 – President Bush delivers an address and answers questions via satellite from Room 459 of the Old Executive Office Building to the annual convention of the National Association of Home Builders during the afternoon. President Bush addresses the Young Astronaut Council in Room 450 of the Old Executive Office Building during the afternoon. President Bush announces the appointment of Sherrie S. Rollins for Assistant to the President for Public Liaison and Intergovernmental Affairs. President Bush announces the nomination of Fred T. Goldberg Jr. for Assistant Secretary of the Treasury for Tax Policy.
- January 27 – President Bush delivers an address at a strategy meeting for controlling drugs in Room 450 of the Old Executive Office Building during the afternoon. President Bush announces the appointment of Les T. Csorba for Special Assistant to the President and Associate Director of Presidential Personnel for National Security Affairs.
- January 28 – President Bush delivers his annual State of the Union Address before a joint session of Congress. President Bush issues a memorandum for department heads and agency leadership on the decline of government regulation burden.
- January 29 – President Bush transmits the 1992 National Drug Control Strategy in a message to Congress. President Bush announces the appointment of Daniel B. McGroarty for Special Assistant to the President and Deputy Director of Speechwriting.
- January 30 – President Bush delivers an address while attending the National Prayer Breakfast at the Washington Hilton Hotel during the morning. President Bush gives a speech to the Greater Philadelphia Chamber of Commerce at the Wyndham Franklin Plaza Hotel in Philadelphia, Pennsylvania during the afternoon.
- January 31 – President Bush gives a speech to the United Nations Security Council in the Security Council Chamber at the United Nations shortly after noon.

== February ==
- February 1 – President Bush holds his one hundred and twentieth news conference with President of Russia Boris Yeltsin at Camp David during the afternoon. The two answer questions from reporters on nuclear weapons, Russian reform, nuclear technology, the negotiation timetable, the commonwealth of independent states, and their relationship.
- February 3 – President Bush transmits "a report of the activities of the United States Government in the United Nations and its affiliated agencies during the calendar year 1990, the second year of my Administration" within a message to Congress. President Bush delivers an address and answers questions at the National Governors' Association in the East Room during the morning.
- February 4 – President Bush delivers an address to the National Grocers Association at the Orange County Convention/Civic Center during the morning. President Bush announces the appointments of Linda Eischeid Tarplin for Special Assistant to the President for Legislative Affairs for the Senate, and Leigh Ann Metzger for Deputy Assistant to the President for Public Liaison. President Bush transmits the Access to Justice Act of 1992 in a message to Congress for consideration and enactment.
- February 5 – President Bush delivers an address to the Small Business Legislative Council at the J.W. Marriott Hotel during the morning.
- February 6 – President Bush delivers an address to the Greater Cleveland Growth Association at the Stouffer Tower City Plaza Hotel in Cleveland, Ohio during the evening. President Bush gives a speech to staff members of the University Medical Center of Southern Nevada at the University Medical Center during the afternoon.
- February 7 – President Bush delivers remarks to the San Diego Rotary Club at the Sheraton Harbor Island Hotel in San Diego, California during the morning. President Bush signs H.R. 4095, which he states will "extend and increase the benefits available under the Emergency Unemployment Compensation program."
- February 10 – President Bush receives the Boy Scouts of America report to the Nation in the Roosevelt Room during the morning. President Bush delivers an address to the Conference on Healthy Children Ready To Learn at the Ramada Renaissance Hotel during the afternoon. President Bush announces the nomination of Robert C. Frasure for Ambassador Extraordinary and Plenipotentiary of the United States of America to Estonia. President Bush issues a statement on the death of Alex Haley reflecting on Haley's work and praising him as "an inspiration for generations to come."
- February 11 – President Bush answers questions from reporters on relations between Turkey and the United States, trade negotiations, and the presidential primaries in the Oval Office during the morning. President Bush attends a departure ceremony for Prime Minister of Turkey Suleyman Demirel in the South Lawn during the afternoon. President Bush attends the Roosevelt Room signing ceremony for the Multilateral Investment Fund Agreement during the afternoon. President Bush answers questions from reporters on the economic plan and health care reform while in the Cabinet Room during the afternoon.
- February 12 – President Bush announces his re-election campaign in a speech reflecting on his tenures as Vice President and President at the J.W. Marriott Hotel during the morning. President Bush delivers an address to the State Legislature in Concord, New Hampshire at the statehouse during the afternoon. President Bush delivers an address to U.S. FIRST at the Technology Center in Manchester, New Hampshire during the afternoon. President Bush issues a statement on the resignation of Richard H. Truly as Administrator of the National Aeronautics and Space Administration, who he states will remain in the position until April 1.
- February 13 – President Bush issues a memorandum on the "Delegation of Authority with Respect to the Conventional Forces in Europe Treaty Implementation Act".
- February 14 – President Bush holds his one hundredth and twenty-first news conference at the Arborview at Riverside construction site in Belcamp, Maryland during the afternoon. Bush answers questions from reporters on the economic plan, Robert Goodwin, and the New Hampshire primary. President Bush submits a report of the National Science Board in a message to Congress. President Bush announces the nomination of George J. Terwilliger III for Deputy Attorney General at the Department of Justice.
- February 15 – President Bush delivers an address at a campaign rally in the Davidson Flight Service hangar at Nashua Airport in Nashua, New Hampshire during the morning. President Bush delivers an economic address at New Boston Central Elementary School in New Boston, New Hampshire during the morning. President Bush delivers an address on his re-election campaign at Pinkerton Academy in Derry, New Hampshire during the evening.
- February 16 – President Bush delivers an address on the economy at Pennichuck Junior High School in Nashua, New Hampshire during the morning. President Bush answers questions on the War on Drugs, education funding, health care, abortion, the economy, capital gains tax, discrimination, and defense budget cuts during a morning appearance at Hollis/Brookline High School in Hollis, New Hampshire.
- February 18 – President Bush meets with President of Moldova Mircea Snegur for the first time, the two agreeing that the US and Moldova "will establish diplomatic relations and exchange Ambassadors in the near future." President Bush wins the New Hampshire Republican primary. Bush releases a statement thanking members of his campaign and statewide officials.
- February 19 – President Bush attends the signing ceremony for a Cooperative Research and Development Agreement in the Oak Ridge National Laboratory in Oak Ridge, Tennessee during the morning. President Bush delivers a speech to community and business leaders in the Knoxville Auditorium-Coliseum in Knoxville, Tennessee during the afternoon. President Bush attends an observance of African-American History Month in the East Room, where he delivers an address lauding African-American historical figures, during the afternoon.
- February 21 – President Bush delivers an address to the American Legislative Exchange Council in Room 450 of the Old Executive Office Building during the morning.
- February 22 – A recording of President Bush, made the previous day, is broadcast on radio. President Bush criticizes a Democratic Party economic plan proposal and the party's refusal to pass the administration's plan.
- February 24 – President Bush signs the Omnibus Insular Areas Act of 1992 into law, which he says will lead to the creation of "a new unit of the National Park System known as the Salt River Bay National Historical Park and Ecological Preserve." President Bush announces the appointment of John A. Gaughan for Deputy Assistant to the President and Director of the White House Military Office. President Bush announces the nomination of Thomas R. Pickering for Ambassador Extraordinary and Plenipotentiary of the United States of America to India.
- February 25 – President Bush answers questions from reporters on former President Ronald Reagan, the economy, loan guarantees in Israel, General Motors Plant closings, Iraq, and his re-election campaign during a morning boarding of Air Force One. President Bush delivers a speech at a fundraising luncheon at the Westin St. Francis Hotel in San Francisco, California during the afternoon.
- February 27 – President Bush announces the nomination of Wayne A. Budd for Associate Attorney General.
- February 28 – President Bush attends the Houston Livestock Show and Rodeo Dinner at the Sheraton Astrodome Hotel in Houston, Texas during the afternoon. President Bush answers questions from reporters on his re-election campaign, agriculture, and a Midland, Texas school named after him during an afternoon appearance in the Houston Astrodome.
- February 29 – President Bush delivers an address to the Associated General Contractors of America at the Dallas Convention Center in Dallas, Texas during the morning.

== March ==
- March 1 – President Bush delivers an address condemning the Democratic Party's tax rate proposal and touts the record of the administration at the Savannah Riverfront in Savannah, Georgia during the afternoon.
- March 2 – President Bush submits an annual report on Hazardous Materials Transportation for 1990 in a message to Congress.
- March 3 – President Bush wins the Georgia Republican presidential primary. President Bush releases a statement saying the victory had pushed his campaign "another step closer to our goal of winning every primary and caucus." President Bush delivers an address to the National Association of Evangelicals at the Hyatt Regency O'Hare Hotel in Chicago, Illinois during the morning.
- March 4 – President Bush answers questions from reporters on the ongoing presidential primary while in the South Lawn during the morning. President Bush delivers a speech on Operation Desert Storm, health care reform, welfare, and the economy at the Omni Westshore Hotel in Tampa, Florida during the afternoon. President Bush delivers an address focusing on Cuba and his re-election campaign while at Milander Park Stadium in Hialeah, Florida during the evening. President Bush delivers an address for his re-election campaign touting the policies of the administration in the East Hall of the Radisson Mart Plaza Hotel in Miami, Florida during the evening.
- March 5 – President Bush delivers an address to the Home Builders Association of Greater Columbia at the South Carolina State Fair Grounds in Columbia, South Carolina during the morning. President Bush delivers an address to employees of Federal Express at the Memphis International Airport in Memphis, Tennessee during the afternoon. President Bush announces the nomination of I. Lewis Libby Jr. for the newly created position of Deputy Under Secretary of Defense for Policy. President Bush signs the Reclamation States Emergency Drought Relief Act of 1991 into law, a bill that he says "provides, for a period of 10 years, general authority for the Secretary of the Interior to take action in the Western States to protect and preserve fish and wildlife habitat and assist farmers and urban dwellers in overcoming drought conditions."
- March 6 – President Bush delivers an address on welfare reform, the economy, and national security at Oklahoma Christian University in Oklahoma City, Oklahoma during the morning. President Bush delivers an address on welfare reform and Congress in the Pete Maravich Arena of Louisiana State University in Baton Rouge, Louisiana during the afternoon. President Bush announces the nomination of James B. Huff Sr. for Administrator of the Rural Electrification Administration, Department of Agriculture. President Bush transmits the summary report from the previous year of the White House Conference on Library and Information Services to a message to Congress.
- March 10 – President Bush announces the nomination of Gregori Lebedev for Inspector General at the U.S. Department of Defense. President Bush delivers an address to the United Negro College Fund Dinner on the State Floor during the evening.
- March 11 – Andrew Card is sworn in as the 11th United States Secretary of Transportation at the National Air and Space Museum during the morning. President Bush delivers an address to the Richard Nixon Library Dinner at the Four Seasons Hotel during the evening, his remarks praising the former president.
- March 12 – President Bush signs the Torture Victim Protection Act of 1991 into law, which he says is in conjunction with his interest in advancing human rights and bringing an end to torture worldwide. President Bush delivers an address to recipients of the Presidential Awards for Excellence in Science and Mathematics Teaching in the Rose Garden during the afternoon. President Bush gives a speech to the National Conference of State Legislatures in Room 450 of the Old Executive Office Building during the afternoon.
- March 13 – President Bush delivers an address to employees of Stryker Corporation in the medical division of the company building in Kalamazoo, Michigan during the morning. President Bush delivers remarks to the Economic Club of Detroit in the Grand Manor Ballroom at Fairlane Manor in Detroit, Michigan during the afternoon.
- March 16 – President Bush gives a speech to employees of Steeltech Manufacturing, Inc. in Milwaukee, Wisconsin during the morning. President Bush attends a fundraising luncheon for his re-election campaign at the Pfister Hotel in Milwaukee during the afternoon. President Bush announces the nomination of Betty Jo Nelsen for Assistant Secretary of Agriculture for Food and Consumer Services and membership of the Board of Directors of the Commodity Credit Corporation.
- March 17 – President Bush awards the Presidential Medal of Freedom to Samuel Walton in at the Walmart headquarters in Bentonville, Arkansas during the morning. President Bush wins the Illinois and Michigan Republican presidential primaries. Bush releases a statement saying his policies have been endorsed by the voters and thanking Governor of Illinois Jim Edgar and Governor of Michigan John Engler.
- March 18 – President Bush announces the appointment of Joshua B. Bolten for Deputy Assistant to the President and Director of the Office of Legislative Affairs.
- March 19 – President Bush signs the Morris K. Udall Scholarship and Excellence in National Environmental and Native American Public Policy Act of 1992 into law. President Bush announces the appointment of Robert Anthony Snow for Deputy Assistant to the President for Media Affairs.
- March 20 – President Bush delivers an address to the undefeated National Collegiate Athletic Association Division I Football Teams in the East Room during the afternoon. President Bush signs H.J. Res. 446, which Bush says "waives the printing requirements of sections 106 and 107 of Title 1 of the United States Code with respect to H.R. 4210."
- March 22 – President Bush holds his one hundred and twenty-fourth news conference with Chancellor of Germany Kohl in the East Room during the afternoon. The two answer questions on multilateral trade negotiations, his re-election campaign, the United Nations Environmental Conference, South Africa, nuclear weapons, legislation for taxes, and the economy.
- March 23 – President Bush issues a statement on the ninth anniversary of the launch of the Strategic Defense Initiative, lauding its success. President Bush issues a statement on the death of Friedrich August von Hayek, expressing sadness over his death and praising his career. President Bush announces the nomination of Thomas P. Kerester for Chief Counsel for Advocacy at the Small Business Administration. Barbara Franklin is sworn in as the 29th United States Secretary of Commerce at the Department of Commerce during the morning.
- March 24 – President Bush delivers an address to the National American Wholesale Grocers Association at the Hyatt Regency Hotel during the morning. President Bush sends a message to Congress outlining the administration's wishes toward the development of the environment and economy. President Bush wins the Connecticut Republican presidential primary. President Bush releases a statement thanking the voters of the state and reflecting on the large margin of victory his campaign had in the state.
- March 25 – President Bush signs the proclamation establishing Greek Independence Day in the Rose Garden during the morning. President Bush releases a statement in response to the 215 – 211 vote of the House in favor of sustaining his veto against the Democratic Party-backed tax increase. President Bush expresses satisfaction with the vote and calls on Democratic lawmakers to assist with the creation of an "economic growth package that will spur savings and investments in this country and create new jobs."
- March 26 – President Bush delivers an address to the Coalition for the Restoration of the Black Family and Society in Room 450 of the Old Executive Office Building during the afternoon. President Bush announces the nomination of Karl A. Erb for Associate Director of the Office of Science and Technology Policy.
- March 27 – President Bush delivers an address to members of the National Science Olympiad that have been awarded medals in Room 450 of the Old Executive Office Building during the afternoon.
- March 31 – President Bush announces the nomination of Wade F. Horn for Deputy Director for Demand Reduction for the Office of National Drug Control Policy. President Bush submits a message to Congress on the subject of the national emergency regarding export controls. President Bush meets with representatives on the subject of health care in the Roosevelt Room during the morning.

== April ==
- April 1 – President Bush holds his one hundred and twenty-fifth news conference in the Briefing Room during the morning. President Bush begins the conference with an address on his request for "bipartisan backing for a new, comprehensive, and integrated program to support the struggle of freedom underway in Russia, Ukraine, and the other new States that have replaced the Soviet Union." Press Secretary Fitzwater says President Bush has approved adjustments to the intelligence community after a review of requirements and a critical assessment. President Bush approves H.J. Res. 456, which he says will implement "funding for economic and democratic development assistance to the republics of the former Soviet Union, funding for the remainder of fiscal year 1992 for certain international agencies, and emergency funding for loans to U.S. small businesses that have been adversely affected by natural disasters."
- April 2 – President Bush announces the nominations of Lauralee M. Peters for Ambassador to the Republic of Sierra Leone, Joan M. McEntee for Under Secretary of Commerce for Export Administration, and Marvin H. Kosters for Commissioner of Labor Statistics at the U.S. Department of Labor. President Bush announces the establishing of "a unified antitrust enforcement policy for mergers and acquisitions, by the Department of Justice and the Federal Trade Commission."
- April 3 – President Bush delivers an address to the Federalist Society of Philadelphia in Congress Hall at Independence National Historical Park in Philadelphia, Pennsylvania during the morning. President Bush submits a message to Congress in which he determines "a waiver of the application of subsections (a) and (b) of section 402 with respect to Armenia, Belarus, Kyrgyzstan, and Russia will substantially promote the objectives of section 402."
- April 4 – A recording of President Bush from the previous day, in which he discusses governmental reform, is broadcast on the radio.
- April 6 – President Bush issues statements on the deaths of Samuel Walton, and Stan Scott. President Bush announces the appointment of Cecile B. Kremer for the position of Deputy Assistant to the President and Director of the Office of Public Liaison.
- April 7 – President Bush announces the nomination of William Dean Hansen for Chief Financial Officer at the Department of Education. President Bush attends the presentation ceremony for the National Teacher of the Year Award in the Rose Garden during the morning. President Bush delivers an address to the American Business Conference at the Willard Hotel during the afternoon.
- April 8 – President Bush delivers an address congratulating American Olympic athletes while on the South Lawn during the afternoon. President Bush announces the nominations of Kenton Wesley Keith for Ambassador to the State of Qatar, and Donald K. Petterson for Ambassador to the Republic of the Sudan.
- April 9 – President Bush delivers an address to the American Society of Newspaper Editors and answers questions on abortion, his re-election campaign, multilateral trade negotiations, foreign aid and trade, and the federal budget at the J.W. Marriott Hotel during the afternoon. President Bush answers questions from reporters on the Manuel Noriega verdict, and British elections during an afternoon appearance in the Oval Office. President Bush announces in a statement that the Food and Drug Administration have commenced "important reforms" within the drug approval process. President Bush submits the annual report on the Federal Advisory Committees for the previous fiscal year in a message to Congress. President Bush announces the nomination of Jerome H. Powell for an Under Secretary of the Treasury.
- April 10 – President Bush answers questions from reporters on welfare reform and elections in Britain during a morning Oval Office appearance. President Bush holds his one hundred and twenty-sixth news conference in the Rose Garden during the afternoon, beginning the conference with an address on international relations and answering questions from reporters on the subjects of national security, the federal budget, education, the environment, interest rates, the economy, abuse of privileges, the budget deficit, media coverage, welfare reform, healthcare, and his re-election campaign. President Bush announces the nomination of Stephen Greene for Deputy Administrator of Drug Enforcement, and Edward Ernest Kubasiewicz for Assistant Commissioner of Patents and Trademarks. President Bush announces in a statement that the Parental and Family Responsibility Project in the state of Wisconsin has been approved.
- April 13 – President Bush meets with Prime Minister of Poland Jan Olszewski for discussions on the shifting climate within Poland as it relates to "democracy and a free market economy" during the afternoon.
- April 14 – President Bush gives a speech to employees of Giddings & Lewis, Inc. at the company's plant in Fraser, Michigan during the afternoon. President Bush delivers an address on education and healthcare during a fundraising dinner for his re-election campaign at the Ritz-Carlton Hotel in Dearborn, Michigan during the evening.
- April 15 – President Bush delivers an address congratulating the National Collegiate Athletic Association Men's and Women's Basketball Champions in the Rose Garden during the morning. Press Secretary Fitzwater releases a statement on President Bush's signing of an executive order to "implement U.N. Security Council Resolution 748 by imposing additional sanctions on Libya." President Bush announces the nominations of G. Kim Wincup for Assistant Secretary of the Air Force for Acquisition, Research, and Development, and James P. Covey for Assistant Secretary of State for South Asian Affairs.
- April 16 – President Bush delivers an address on education to the Lehigh Valley 2000 Community at Dieruff High School in Allentown, Pennsylvania during the afternoon. President Bush announces the nomination of Roger A. McGuire for Ambassador Extraordinary and Plenipotentiary of the United States of America to the Republic of Guinea-Bissau.
- April 18 – President Bush's radio address on Job Training 2000 is broadcast during the morning. The speech was recorded two days prior. President Bush in a statement iterates his support for Cuba and policies from the administration that will be geared toward the country.
- April 20 – President Bush attends the opening ceremony for AmeriFlora '92 Exposition in Columbus, Ohio during the morning. President Bush announces the nominations of Dennis P. Barrett for Ambassador to the Democratic Republic of Madagascar, and William Lacy Swing for Ambassador Extraordinary and Plenipotentiary of the United States of America to the Federal Republic of Nigeria.
- April 21 – President Bush meets with sixteen business leaders for talks on "how the American private sector can help to meet the most important foreign policy challenge that faces us, the transformation of the new States in the former U.S.S.R. from command to market economies and from authoritarian to democratic governments" during the morning. President Bush delivers an address to the Young Presidents' Organization in Room 450 of the Old Executive Office Building during the afternoon.
- April 22 – President Bush attends the departure ceremony for Anibal Cavaco Silva and Jacques Delors in the South Lawn during the afternoon. President Bush delivers an address congratulating the 1992 Super Bowl Champion Washington Redskins in the Rose Garden during the evening. President Bush announces the nomination of James D. Jameson for an Assistant Secretary of Commerce for Trade Development. President Bush announces the appointment of Walter H. Kansteiner III for Special Assistant to the President and Deputy Press Secretary for Foreign Affairs.
- April 23 – President Bush delivers an address to the United States Academic Decathlon Winners in the Rose Garden during the morning. President Bush attends the signing ceremony for the Paper Market Access Agreement With Japan in the Roosevelt Room during the morning. President Bush attends the unveiling ceremony for the White House Commemorative Stamp in the Rose Garden during the afternoon. President Bush announces the nominations of Richard Goodwin Capen Jr. for United States Ambassador to Spain, and Clarence H. Albright Jr. for General Counsel of the Department of Housing and Urban Development.
- April 24 – President Bush attends the presentation ceremony for the National Crime Victims' Rights Awards in the Rose Garden during the morning. President Bush announces the administration will be undertaking a "package of banking initiatives designed to streamline financial regulation" in the Briefing Room during the morning. President Bush participates in a teleconference with the National Association of Hispanic Journalists while in Room 459 of the Old Executive Office Building, during which he answers questions on Puerto Rico statehood, federal court appointments, and freedom of the press.
- April 25 – President Bush's recorded remarks on trade reform attempts on the part of his administration is broadcast on the radio.
- April 27 – President Bush announces the nomination of William Clark Jr. for an Assistant Secretary of State for East Asian and Pacific Affairs. President Bush attends the commencement ceremony for Florida International University at the Miami Beach Convention Center in Miami Beach, Florida during the afternoon.
- April 28 – President Bush delivers an address on education and healthcare at his re-election campaign headquarters during the afternoon. President Bush attends the Annual Republican Congressional Fundraising Dinner at the Washington Convention Center during the evening.
- April 29 – President Bush delivers a speech on the subject of regulatory reform in the Rose Garden during the afternoon. President Bush attends a state dinner for President of Germany Richard von Weizsacker in the State Dining Room during the evening.

== May ==
- May 1 – President Bush delivers an address during the Great American Workout in the South Lawn during the morning. The event is meant to commence National Fitness Month. President Bush attends the award ceremony for the Points of Light in the East Room during the afternoon. President Bush announces the nomination of Adrian A. Basora for Ambassador to the Czech and Slovak Federal Republic. President Bush announces the appointment of Clayton S. Fong for Deputy Assistant to the President for Public Liaison.
- May 4 – President Bush answers questions from reporters on federal aid to cities in the Cabinet Room during the morning. President Bush announces the nomination of Arthur J. Rothkopf for Deputy Secretary of Transportation, and Michael James Toohey for Assistant Secretary of Transportation for Governmental Affairs. President Bush announces the appointment of John C. Harper for Chairman of the Advisory Council on Historic Preservation.
- May 5 – President Bush announces the nominations of Peter Barry Teeley for Ambassador Extraordinary and Plenipotentiary of the United States of America to Canada, and Reginald Bartholomew for the United States Permanent Representative on the Council of the North Atlantic Treaty Organization, with the rank of Ambassador.
- May 6 – President Bush and President of Ukraine Leonid Kravchuk issue a joint statement on the establishment of American relations with Ukraine as a result of the latter country's developing of "democracy and independence." President Bush holds his one hundredth and twenty-seventh news conference with President Kravchuk in the East Room during the afternoon, answering questions from reporters on START I, legislation relating to social programs, nuclear power plants, urban policy assessment, Crimea, Ukrainian security and nuclear weapons, and President Bush's visit to Los Angeles. President Bush announces the nominations of Robert E. Gribbin III for Ambassador of the United States to the Central African Republic, and Peter Jon de Vos for Ambassador of the United States to the United Republic of Tanzania. President Bush arrives in Los Angeles during the evening. In his remarks at Los Angeles International Airport, Bush states that he will meet with community leaders in an effort to assure members of the city that the federal government is dedicated to helping Los Angeles rebuild.
- May 7 – President Bush delivers an address at Mount Zion Missionary Baptist Church in Los Angeles during the morning. President Bush announces the nomination of William T. Pryce for Ambassador to the Republic of Honduras.
- May 8 – President Bush delivers an address to firefighters and personnel of law enforcement in Los Angeles during the morning. President Bush gives a speech to military and law enforcement personnel at the Los Angeles Coliseum during the morning. President Bush announces the nominations of Alexander Fletcher Watson for Ambassador to the Federative Republic of Brazil, and William Graham Walker for United States Ambassador to Argentina.
- May 11 – President Bush delivers an address on maternal and infant health care in the Rose Garden during the morning. President Bush interacts with the Weed and Seed Revitalization Committee as well as community leaders in the gymnasium at St. Boniface Church in Philadelphia during the afternoon. President Bush attends a fundraising dinner for his re-election campaign in the Grand Ballroom at the Hotel Atop the Bellevue in Philadelphia during the evening.
- May 12 – President Bush issues a statement on urban aid initiatives, outlining the six core components behind his proposals. In a morning appearance in the Oval Office, President Bush addresses his initiatives geared toward urban aid and answers questions from reporters on race relations, the U.N.'s conference on the environment, and cooperation with Congress. President Bush attends a ceremony honoring the Small Business Administration Award Winners in the Rose Garden during the afternoon.
- May 13 – President Bush attends the state dinner for President of Chile Patricio Aylwin in the State Dining Room during the evening. President Bush announces the nomination of John F. Daffron Jr. for membership on the Board of Directors of the State Justice Institute for a term expiring in two years.
- May 14 – President Bush delivers an address to volunteers of Take Pride in America in Anacostia Park during the afternoon. President Bush submits a report on the national emergency pertaining to Iran in a message to Congress. President Bush announces the nomination of Donald Herman Alexander for United States Ambassador to the Kingdom of The Netherlands.
- May 16 – President Bush attends the commencement ceremony for Southern Methodist University at Moody Coliseum in Dallas, Texas during the morning.
- May 17 – President Bush attends the commencement ceremony for the University of Notre Dame in the Joyce Athletic and Convocation Center in South Bend, Indiana during the afternoon.
- May 18 – President Bush delivers an address to the National Association of Home Builders in the South Lawn during the morning. President Bush announces the nomination of John A. Cline for Special Assistant to the President for Intergovernmental Affairs.
- May 19 – President Bush delivers an address to the National Retail Federation in Room 450 of the Old Executive Office Building during the afternoon. President Bush submits the Convention for the Conservation of Anadromous Stocks in the North Pacific Ocean in a message to the Senate. President Bush announces the nomination of William Arthur Rugh for United States Ambassador to the United Arab Emirates.
- May 20 – President Bush holds his one hundredth and twenty-eighth news conference with Prime Minister Mulroney on the South Lawn during the afternoon, answering questions initiatives for urban aid, abortion, family values, comments by Vice President Quayle, trade between Canada and the United States, habitat protection for the spotted owl, and the North American Free Trade Agreement.
- May 21 – President Bush attends a fundraising dinner for his re-election campaign in the Grand Ballroom of the Stouffer Tower City Plaza Hotel in Cleveland, Ohio at noon. President Bush attends the Ohio Freedom Day Celebration in the auditorium at St. Josephat's Cathedral in Parma, Ohio during the afternoon. President Bush attends a fundraising picnic for his re-election campaign in Hangar 26 at the Westchester County Regional Airport in Westchester, New York during the evening. President Bush announces the nomination of James E. Gilleran for Comptroller of the Currency at the Department of Treasury for a five-year term.
- May 28 – President Bush delivers an address to the American Legion at the American Legion Luke Greenway Post in Phoenix, Arizona during the afternoon. President Bush attends a fundraising dinner for John McCain at the Phoenix Civic Plaza during the evening. President Bush announces the nominations of Edward Hurwitz for Ambassador of the United States of America to the Republic of Kyrgyzstan, Henry Lee Clarke for Ambassador of the United States of America to the Republic of Uzbekistan. and Anthony Cecil Eden Quainton for Assistant Secretary of State for Diplomatic Security.
- May 29 – President Bush delivers an address at Harvard Recreation Center in Los Angeles, California during the morning. President Bush answers questions during a town hall in the Biltmore Bowl at the Biltmore Hotel in Los Angeles during the afternoon. President Bush announces the nominations of Robert L. Gallucci for Assistant Secretary of State for Politico-Military Affairs, and Joseph Monroe Segars for Ambassador of the United States of America to the Republic of Cape Verde.

== June ==
- June 1 – President Bush delivers a speech to employees of Goddard Space Flight Center in the auditorium in Building 8 in Greenbelt, Maryland during the afternoon. President Bush announces the nominations of Alison Podell Rosenberg for an assistant administrator of the Agency for International Development, and Walter B. McCormick Jr. for General Counsel of the Department of Transportation.
- June 2 – President Bush attends a briefing of Health Care Equity Action League in Room 450 of the Old Executive Office Building during the afternoon. President Bush releases a statement on the conclusion of the presidential primaries, thanking his supporters and stating what can be accomplished in the event of his re-election. President Bush announces the appointments of the 1992–93 White House fellows, their tenure beginning in four months.
- June 3 – President Bush holds a bipartisan meeting with members of Congress on the subject of prompting the balanced budget amendment proposal to "get something done for the taxpayer" during the morning. President Bush announces the nomination of John Frank Bookout Jr. for Ambassador of the United States of America to the Kingdom of Saudi Arabia. President Bush submits a message to Congress on trade with portions of both Eastern Europe and the Soviet Union.
- June 4 – President Bush signs a proclamation commemorating the fiftieth anniversary of World War II in the Roosevelt Room during the morning. President Bush announces the nomination of Kenneth L. Brown for Ambassador of the United States of America to the Republic of Ghana.
- June 7 – President Bush holds his one hundredth and thirtieth news conference with Prime Minister of the United Kingdom John Major at Camp David during the afternoon, the two answering questions on the economy, Czechoslovakia, the disclosure of confidential information, the Trident Missile System, the U.N. Conference on Environment, a joint session of Congress, and President Bush's re-election campaign.
- June 8 – President Bush meets with state legislators at the White House for discussions on the balanced budget amendment. President Bush makes remarks about the contents of the meeting in the Roosevelt Room during the morning. President Bush announces the nomination of Mary Jo Jacobi for Assistant Secretary of Commerce for Congressional and Intergovernmental Affairs.
- June 9 – President Bush answers questions from reporters over meetings between Russian Minister of Foreign Affairs Andrei Kozyrev and members of Congress in the Cabinet Room during the morning. President Bush attends a fundraising dinner for Senator Arlen Specter at Mumma Farm in Bowmansdale, Pennsylvania during the evening. President Bush announces the nomination of Frank G. Wisner for Under Secretary of State for Coordinating Security Assistance Programs.
- June 10 – President Bush delivers a radio address in favor of the balanced budget amendment proposal and calling for Americans to request their representatives support the measure. The address was recorded and broadcast during the afternoon.
- June 11 – President Bush attends a luncheon hosted by President of Panama Guillermo Endara at the Presidential Palace in Panama City, Panama during the afternoon. President Bush delivers an address to American people in Albrook Air Force Base during the afternoon. President Bush releases a statement on the House vote for the balanced budget amendment proposal, expressing satisfaction with it passing.
- June 12 – President Bush addresses the United Nations Conference on Environment and Development in the Assembly Hall at the Riocentro Conference Center located in Rio de Janeiro, Brazil during the afternoon. President Bush signs the Framework Convention on Climate Change, which he says "provides the flexibility for national programs to be reviewed and updated as new scientific information becomes available." President Bush announces the nomination of Jose Antonio Villamil for Under Secretary of Commerce for Economic Affairs. President Bush announces the appointment of Shiree Sanchez for Special Assistant to the President for Public Liaison.
- June 14 – President Bush attends the groundbreaking ceremony for the Korean War Veterans Memorial during the afternoon.
- June 15 – President Bush announces the appointment of Shirley M. Green for Deputy Assistant to the President for Presidential Messages and Correspondence. President Bush announces the nomination of Robert S. Silberman for Assistant Secretary of the Army for Manpower and Reserve Affairs.
- June 16 – President Bush and Russian President Yeltsin answers questions from reporters on American prisoners of war and nuclear arms agreement in the Oval Office during the morning. President Bush announces his agreement with President Yeltsin on "far-reaching new strategic arms reductions" and the two answer questions from reporters in the Rose Garden during a joint appearance in the afternoon. President Bush submits a message to the Senate with S. 2342 without his approval and explains his rationale for not backing the bill. President Bush announces the nominations of Charles B. Salmon Jr. for Ambassador of the United States to the Lao People's Democratic Republic, and Nicolas Miklos Salgo for Ambassador of the United States to Sweden.
- June 17 – President Bush delivers an address to the United States-Russia Business Summit at the J.W. Marriott Hotel during the morning. President Bush holds his one hundred and thirty-second news conference in the East Room during the afternoon with President Yeltsin, answering questions from reporters on arms agreements, the federal budget, agreements between Russia and the United States, and the Global Defense System. The United States and Russia release a joint statement on the discussions of their presidents relating to the establishment of a Global Protection System and coming to a consensus that a high level group should be formed to explore the development of components relating to protection. President Bush announces the nominations of Richard Monroe Miles for Ambassador of the United States of America to the Republic of Azerbaijan, and Ruth A. Davis for Ambassador of the United States of America to the Republic of Benin.
- June 18 – President Bush attends a morning South Lawn ceremony honoring Presidential Scholars and delivers a speech. President Bush announces the nomination of Richard H. Solomon for Ambassador of the United States of America to the Republic of the Philippines. President Bush announces the appointment of Potter Stewart for Representative of the United States of America on the Executive Board of the United Nations Children's Fund.
- June 19 – President Bush announces the nominations of William Harrison Courtney for Ambassador of the United States of America to Kazakhstan, and Patricia Diaz Dennis for Assistant Secretary of State for Human Rights and Humanitarian Affairs.
- June 20 – President Bush delivers an address to the Howard Jarvis Taxpayers Association at the Universal City Hilton in Universal City, California during the morning. President Bush attends the Texas State Republican Convention at the Dallas Convention Center in Dallas during the afternoon.
- June 22 – President Bush signs H.R. 5132, a supplemental appropriations bill providing "emergency funding for the nationwide disaster programs of the Federal Emergency Management Agency, FEMA, and for the Small Business Administration, SBA" in the Rose Garden during the afternoon.
- June 23 – President Bush answers questions from reporters on a possible railroad strike in the Oval Office during the morning. President Bush attends the presentation ceremony for the National Medal of Science and the National Medal of Technology in the Rose Garden during the afternoon. President Bush announces the nominations of Christopher H. Phillips for membership on the Board of Directors of the United States Institute of Peace, and Nancy M. Dowdy for Special Representative for Arms Control Negotiations and Disarmament (Chief Science Adviser).
- June 24 – President Bush has a morning meeting with members of the House of Representatives from both parties to thank them "for the courage, vision, and responsibility they displayed supporting the balanced budget constitutional amendment." President Bush sends Congress the Credit Availability and Regulatory Relief Act of 1992 for consideration and possible enactment in a message. President Bush issues a statement on the Supreme Court ruling in Lee v. Weisman expressing his disappointment. President Bush announces the nominations of H. Douglas Barclay for membership on the Board of Directors of the Overseas Private Investment Corporation, and David Heywood Swartz for Ambassador of the United States of America to the Republic of Byelarus.
- June 25 – President Bush attends a discussion on the subject of education in the Roosevelt Room during the morning. President Bush gives a speech on education in the South Lawn during the morning. During the address, Bush announces his intent to send Congress "legislation that would authorize an ambitious demonstration program". President Bush delivers an address to the College Republican Convention at the Omni Shoreham Hotel during the afternoon. President Bush announces the nominations of Kathryn D. Sullivan for Chief Scientist of the National Oceanic and Atmospheric Administration, and C.C. Hope Jr. for membership on the Board of Directors of the Federal Deposit Insurance Corporation.
- June 26 – President Bush attends a ceremony marking the remains of Ignacy Paderewski returning to Poland in the Rose Garden during the morning. President Bush announces the nomination of Hugo Pomrehn for Under Secretary of Energy. President Bush directs Marshall Jordan Breger to perform the duties of the Assistant Secretary of Labor for Labor-Management Standard starting in three days on June 29.
- June 27 – President Bush's recorded radio address from the previous day is broadcast. His remarks are geared toward his legislative proposal on education reform.
- June 29 – President Bush attends a dedication ceremony for the Drug Enforcement Administration's New York Field Division Office in New York City in the DEA New York Field Division Office conference room during the morning. President Bush attends a fundraising luncheon for Senator Alfonse M. D'Amato while in the Grand Ballroom of New York Hilton Hotel during the afternoon. President Bush delivers an address at a dinner for his re-election campaign in the Mackinac Ballroom at the Westin Hotel during the evening.
- June 30 – President Bush issues a statement criticizing health care fraud as "a type of crime which victimizes all American" and praises the federal government for taking action with the first phase of Operation Goldpill.

== July ==
- July 1 – President Bush meets with Japanese Prime Minister Miyazawa for discussions on relations between their two countries. The two leaders make a joint appearance in the Rose Garden during the afternoon. President Bush announces the nomination of Robert E. Martinez for Associate Deputy Secretary of Transportation. President Bush announces the appointment of Carroll E. Multz for United States Commissioner on the Upper Colorado River Commission.
- July 2 – In a morning appearance at the House Chamber, President Bush announces the sending to Congress of "the fourth piece of our comprehensive health care reform package, medical malpractice reform." President Bush then answers questions on the economy, his re-election campaign, and the unemployment benefits. President Bush confirms in a statement that the planned withdrawal of America from nuclear weapons he announced on September 27 had been completed. President Bush transmits the Health Care Liability Reform and Quality of Care Improvement Act of 1992 to Congress for consideration and possible enacting in a message. President Bush announces the nominations of Mack F. Mattingly for Ambassador of the United States of America to the Republic of Seychelles, and Mary C. Pendleton for Ambassador of the United States of America to the Republic of Moldova.
- July 3 – President Bush signs the Unemployment Compensation Amendments of 1992. The legislation extends the Emergency Unemployment Compensation (EUC) program to March of the following year, it having initially been set to expire on July 4, 1992. President Bush proclaims Bolivia and Colombia "to be beneficiary countries under the Andean Trade Preference Act of 1991 (ATPA)." The proclamation makes the two countries the first designated under the Andean Trade Preference Act. A recording of President Bush discussing health care reform is broadcast, the recording being made the previous day.
- July 4 – President Bush attends the Richard Petty Tribute at Daytona International Speedway in Daytona Beach during the morning.
- July 5 – President Bush delivers an address to Polish citizens in Castle Square during the afternoon.
- July 7 – The Economic Summit releases a declaration on the world economy, developing countries, Europe, and the independent states of the former Soviet Union.
- July 8 – President Bush holds his one hundred and thirty-fourth news conference in Munich, Germany shortly before and after noon. President Bush answers questions from reporters on the Economic Summit and domestic politics, multilateral trade negotiations, Russia, Yugoslavia, urban policy, future American troop development, President Yeltsin, the global economy, nuclear energy, and the federal budget deficit.
- July 9 – President Bush delivers an address to the Conference on Security and Cooperation at the Helsinki Fair Center in Helsinki, Finland during the afternoon. President Bush releases a statement on the New American Schools Development Corporation, saying it is in line with the administration's education policy.
- July 10 – President Bush and Prime Minister of Hungary József Antall answer questions from reporters on refugees, eastern Europe, Yugoslavia, Czechoslovakia, European security, bilateral discussions, and U.S. Naval development while at the Helsinki Fair Center during the morning. President Bush delivers remarks on continued negotiations at the Helsinki Fair Center during the afternoon. President Bush signs the ADAMHA Reorganization Act. The bill serves as an amendment to "certain alcohol, drug abuse, and mental health research and services programs."
- July 13 – President Bush announces, in a statement, his creation of "a set of principles to guide our nonproliferation efforts in the years ahead and directed a number of steps to supplement our existing efforts." President Bush announces his nominations of Linton F. Brooks for Assistant Director of the United States Arms Control and Disarmament Agency at the Bureau of Strategic and Nuclear Affairs, and Walter Scott Light for Ambassador of the United States of America to the Republic of Ecuador.
- July 14 – President Bush answers questions from reporters on the Baker rumors and the issue he finds most important while in Sequoia National Forest during the morning. President Bush holds his one hundredth and thirty-fifth news conference in the California Room of the San Diego Mission during the afternoon with President of Mexico Carlos Salinas. The two answer questions on the Alvarez-Machain case, unauthorized campaign organization, and trade negotiations. President Bush announces the nominations of Walter Scott Blackburn for membership on the Board of Directors of the National Institute of Building Sciences, and John Cameron Monjo for Ambassador of the United States of America to the Islamic Republic of Pakistan.
- July 16 – Independent candidate Ross Perot announces his withdrawal from the presidential election. President Bush delivers an address in response to his exit to reporters by telephone in Boulder, Colorado during the morning. President Bush holds his one hundredth and thirty-sixth news conference at the U.S. Air Force Pinedale Seismic Research Facility during the afternoon. The conference is centered around his re-election campaign.
- July 17 – President Bush delivers a speech at Jackson Hole Airport in Jackson Hole, Wyoming shortly after noon. President Bush announces the nomination of Harriet Winsar Isom for Ambassador of the United States of America to the Republic of Cameroon.
- July 18 – President Bush delivers an address at Brigham Young University at the Marriott Center during the morning. President Bush answers questions on the environment from outdoor groups at Red Butte Gardens in Salt Lake City, Utah during the morning.
- July 20 – President Bush takes part in a question and answer session with the American Legion Boys Nation in the Rose Garden during the morning. President Bush answers questions on vetoing a voter registration bill, urban aid, economics, NAFTA, education, foreign aid, his re-election campaign, the economy, and AIDS. Václav Havel resigns as President of Czechoslovakia. President Bush releases a statement praising Haval and stating the interest of the United States in preserving peaceful relations with Czechoslovakia.
- July 21 – President Bush attends a forum on education at Archbishop Ryan High School in Philadelphia, Pennsylvania shortly after noon. President Bush delivers an address to ethnic and religious groups at Three Saints Russian Orthodox Church in Garfield, New Jersey during the afternoon. President Bush announces federal waivers allowing New Jersey to put in place state-level welfare reforms in a statement. President Bush transmits the United States-Luxembourg agreement in a message to Congress endorsing the measure. President Bush announces the appointment of Lou E. Dantzler for membership on the National Commission on America's Urban Families.
- July 22 – President Bush delivers an address to the President's Drug Advisory Council in the Rose Garden during the morning. President Bush attends the presentation ceremony for the National Medal of the Arts in the East Room shortly after noon. President Bush gives a speech at an anti-drug rally at Drew Elementary School in Arlington, Virginia during the afternoon. President Bush announces the nomination of Alan Greenspan for United States Alternate Governor of the International Monetary Fund.
- July 23 – President Bush signs the Higher Education Amendments of 1992 at Northern Virginia Community College during the afternoon. The legislation serves as a resuming in authorization of parts of the Higher Education Act of 1965.
- July 24 – President Bush delivers an address to the National League of Families of American Prisoners and Missing in Southeast Asia at the Stouffer Concourse Hotel in Arlington during the morning. President Bush delivers an address on his re-election campaign at Golden Gate Park in Brookville, Ohio during the afternoon. President Bush participates in a discussion at Shelter Gardens Park in Columbia, Missouri during the afternoon.
- July 31 – President Bush gives a speech in a meeting with community service clubs at the Riverside Convention Center during the morning. President Bush announces the appointment of Constance Horner for membership on the Council of the Administrative Conference of the United States.

== August ==
- August 2 – President Bush attends a fundraising brunch for Richard S. Williamson at the Hyatt Regency O'Hare Hotel in Rosemont, Illinois during the afternoon. President Bush advocates for his re-election and touts the record of the administration as having changed the world during an afternoon appearance at a Republican family picnic at Ned Brown Preserve.
- August 3 – President Bush delivers an address to employees of Multitex Corp in Dalton, Georgia during the morning.
- August 4 – President Bush announces the nominations of Edward S. Walker for Deputy Representative of the United States to the United Nations, and Roland Karl Kuchel for Ambassador of the United States of America to the Republic of Haiti. In a statement, President Bush announces the publishing of rules permitting parental authority in the determining of child care.
- August 5 – President Bush attends the Knights of Columbus Supreme Council Convention at the Marriott Marquis Hotel in New York City during the morning. President Bush attends the Disabled American Veterans National Convention in the Goldwyn Ballroom at the Reno Hilton Hotel during the afternoon.
- August 6 – President Bush delivers an address to the American Legislative Exchange Council at the Broadmoor Hotel International Center in Colorado Springs, Colorado during the morning. President Bush delivers an address on Bosnia and answers questions from reporters about American military mobilization, a message to Saddam Hussein, and the death camps existing abroad at the Peterson Air Force Base shortly after noon. President Bush announces the appointment of Charles A. Gillespie Jr. for Special Assistant to the President for National Security Affairs.
- August 7 – President Bush holds his one hundredth and thirty-seventh news conference in the Briefing Room during the morning. President Bush answers questions from reporters on American aid to Russia, his re-election campaign, Iraq, the economy, and Bosnia. President Bush signs the Pacific Yew Act into law, which he said ensures "Federal lands will be managed to provide for the sustainable harvest and long-term conservation of the Pacific yew."
- August 8 – President Bush holds his one hundredth and thirty-eighth news conference at his Walker's Point home during the afternoon. President Bush answers questions from reporters on Bosnia, intelligence briefings, and his re-election campaign.
- August 10 – President Bush announces his nomination of Harry J. Gilmore for Ambassador of the United States to Armenia.
- August 11 – President Bush holds his one hundredth and thirty-ninth news conference at his Walker's Point home with Prime Minister of Israel Yitzhak Rabin during the morning. The two answer questions on relations between the United States and Israel, loan guarantees to Israel, Middle East talks on preserving the region's peace, New York Post allegations, Jerusalem, and the Palestinians.
- August 12 – President Bush announces the completion of negotiations for the North American Free Trade Agreement in the Rose Garden during the morning. President Bush sends the Treaty on Open Skies to the Senate in a message in which he favorably details the treaty. President Bush announces the nomination of Lois L. Evans for Representative of the United States of America on the Economic and Social Council of the United Nation.
- August 13 – President Bush states that he has asked United States Secretary of State James Baker to resign his position in order to become White House Chief of Staff while in the Briefing Room during the morning.
- August 17 – President Bush attends the Veterans of Foreign Wars National Convention at the Indiana Convention Center in Indianapolis, Indiana during the morning. President Bush attends a welcoming rally for his re-election campaign at the Houston Astrodome in Houston, Texas during the afternoon. President Bush announces the appointment of C. Dean McGrath Jr. as Deputy Assistant to the President and Deputy Staff Secretary. President Bush signs the Thomas Jefferson Commemoration Commission Act into law. The legislation establishes the Thomas Jefferson Commemorative Commission with the intention of creating and composing ways to mark the two hundred and fiftieth anniversary of the birth of Thomas Jefferson.
- August 18 – President Bush attends an anti-drug rally at Hamilton Middle School in Houston, where he delivers an address on education.
- August 19 – President Bush delivers an address to the gala for the Republican National Committee at the George R. Brown Center during the afternoon.
- August 20 – President Bush delivers a speech at the Republican National Convention in the Houston Astrodome in Houston, Texas during the evening.
- August 21 – President Bush delivers an address to the Republican National Committee at the Hyatt Regency Hotel during the morning.
- August 22 – President Bush attends a campaign rally in Hoover, Alabama at the Riverchase Galleria shopping mall during the afternoon. President Bush attends the National Affairs Briefing in the Dallas Convention Center in Dallas during the evening.
- August 23 – President Bush delivers an address to Springfield, Illinois residents at the Illinois State Fairgrounds during the afternoon.
- August 24 – President Bush announces the appointments of Margaret DeBardeleben Tutwiler for Assistant to the President for Communications, Robert B. Zoellick for Deputy Chief of Staff to the President. President Bush announces the nomination of Randall Harvey Erben for Assistant Secretary of Housing and Urban Development for Community Planning and Development.
- August 25 – President Bush delivers remarks at the American Legion National Convention at the Sheraton Chicago Hotel in Chicago during the morning. President Bush attends a rally for his re-election campaign at Canton Township Heritage Park in Canton, Michigan during the afternoon. In a statement, President Bush confirms welfare waivers have been approved for the state of Michigan.
- August 27 – President Bush delivers an address at a re-election rally in Fountain Square in Cincinnati, Ohio during the afternoon. In an afternoon appearance at the Toledo Express Airport in Toledo, Ohio, President Bush announces his directing of federal troops to provide assistance to the victims of Hurricane Andrew. President Bush delivers an address to employees of Findlay Machine and Tool at the company headquarters in Tall Timbers Industrial Park in Findlay, Ohio during the afternoon.
- August 28 – President Bush announces the nomination of Alvin P. Adams Jr. for Ambassador of the United States of America to the Republic of Peru.
- August 29 – President Bush says he is ordering "an additional 5,000 military troops be sent in order to increase existing services such as the provision of food, kitchens, tents, and delivery of shelter-related items" toward hurricane relief and answers questions from reporters on Hurricane Andrew in the Cabinet Room during the afternoon.
- August 30 – President Bush addresses ongoing efforts toward providing hurricane relief amid a morning appearance in the Cabinet Room.
- August 31 – President Bush meets with home builders, volunteer organizations, multiple federal officials, and representatives of insurance companies and small businesses. President Bush specifies the content of the meeting later that day in the Roosevelt Room during the afternoon. President Bush announces "the Russian Federation and the United States have now also initialed an agreement to ensure that highly enriched uranium from dismantled nuclear weapons will be used only for peaceful purposes" in a statement.

== September ==
- September 1 – President Bush makes a satellite appearance at the America 2000 Satellite Town Meeting from the Oval Office during the morning. President Bush delivers an address and answers questions from reporters on hurricane relief at Homestead Middle School in Homestead, Florida during the morning. The White House announces that President Bush has waived his August 24 declaration of the state and local cost sharing requirements in Florida. President Bush announces the nomination of Nancy A. Nord for Commissioner of the Consumer Product Safety Commission.
- September 2 – President Bush delivers an address on trade and agriculture to citizens at the Kapperman farm in Humboldt, South Dakota during the morning. President Bush delivers an address to employees of Shallowater Co-op Gin at the company headquarters in Shallowater, Texas during the afternoon. President Bush appoints Frederick H. Grubbe to the position of Deputy Director of the Office of Consumer Affairs at the Department of Health and Human Services.
- September 3 – President Bush meets with Administrator of the Small Business Administration Pat Saiki and during the meeting is informed of the Small Business Administration responding to his request of expediting loan process to Hurricane Andrew victims. President Bush afterward releases a statement saying in part, "SBA loans that typically require 30 to 60 days will now be processed in just 7 days."
- September 4 – President Bush delivers an address at Goolrick's Pharmacy in Fredericksburg, Virginia during the morning. President Bush signs the Small Business Credit and Business Opportunity Enhancement Act of 1992 into law. The legislation is stated by President Bush to provide "a major stimulus to the growth and development of small businesses." President Bush announces the appointment of Daniel Casse for Special Assistant to the President for Cabinet Affairs.
- September 5 – President Bush delivers an address at the Lake County fairgrounds in Painesville, Ohio during the morning. President Bush arrives in Greenville, South Carolina at the Greenville-Spartanburg Airport during the afternoon. President Bush delivers an address detailing his intentions in the state and critiquing Democratic nominee Clinton. President Bush attends the North Carolina Apple Festival at the Henderson County Courthouse in Hendersonville during the afternoon. The White House announces that President Bush has amended his August 26 declaration of a major disaster in Louisiana to include a waiver of state and local cost sharing requirements.
- September 6 – President Bush delivers a speech to citizens at the Copernicus Center in Chicago, Illinois during the afternoon.
- September 8 – President Bush transmits the United Nations Framework Convention on Climate Change in a message to the Senate calling for the legislative body to approve the measure. In a statement, President Bush confirms the administration has agreed to accept welfare waivers per the request of the state of Virginia. The White House says President Bush earlier in the day sent Congress "emergency supplemental requests to cover the incremental costs arising from the consequences of Hurricane Andrew and Typhoon Omar."
- September 9 – President Bush says his upcoming meeting with Republicans can benefit attempts on the part of the administration in reforming health care during a morning appearance in the Cabinet Room. President Bush gives a speech at a rally for his re-election campaign at the Veterans of Foreign Wars Hall in Middletown, New Jersey during the afternoon. President Bush transmits the Ireland-United States Social Security Agreement to Congress in a message for approval by both chambers.
- September 10 – President Bush addresses the Economic Club of Detroit at the Cobo Hall during the afternoon.
- September 11 – President Bush delivers an address at Missouri Southern State College in Joplin, Missouri during the morning.
- September 14 – President Bush delivers an address to the Natural Communities Conservation Planning Organizations in an appearance at Rancho Penasquitos in San Diego, California during the morning. President Bush gives a speech to employees of Vaagen Brothers Lumber at the company headquarters in Colville, Washington during the afternoon.
- September 15 – President Bush gives a speech to the National Guard Association at the Salt Palace Convention Center in Salt Lake City, Utah during the morning. President Bush delivers a speech to employees of Sandia National Laboratories at a company laboratory in Albuquerque, New Mexico during the afternoon.
- September 16 – The White House announces that President Bush will amend an earlier declaration of a major disaster in Hawaii to include waivers for "State and local cost sharing requirements and allow reimbursement of 100 percent of eligible public assistance costs exceeding per capita."
- September 17 – President Bush delivers an address in the Enid Convention Hall in Enid, Oklahoma during the morning. President Bush gives a speech at a home site in the Avery of Walnut Creek development in Jonesboro, Georgia during the afternoon. President Bush attends the Olympic Flag Jam '92 at the Georgia Dome in Atlanta during the evening.
- September 18 – President Bush delivers a speech to AT&T employees at the company's corporate headquarters in Basking Ridge, New Jersey during the afternoon.
- September 20 – President Bush delivers an address to the G – 7 Finance Ministers and Bank Governors in the East Room during the evening.
- September 21 – President Bush gives a speech to the United Nations General Assembly in the General Assembly Hall during the morning. President Bush announces the nominations of Marshall Fletcher McCallie for Ambassador of the United States of America to the Republic of Namibia, and Robert Gregory Joseph for Assistant Director of the U.S. Arms Control and Disarmament Agency (Bureau of Verification and Intelligence).
- September 22 – President Bush gives a speech at the University Plaza Convention Center in Springfield, Missouri during the morning. President Bush delivers an address at Tulsa International Airport in Tulsa, Oklahoma criticizing Governor Clinton and promoting current policies during the morning.
- September 23 – President Bush addresses the Independent Business Coalition of his re-election campaign in the Biltmore Room of the Joseph S. Koury Convention Center located in Greensboro, North Carolina during the morning. President Bush delivers a speech at the Joseph S. Koury Convention Center that morning. President Bush delivers an address at Pennsylvania State University on the Old Main Lawn during the afternoon. President Bush signs H.R. 5620 into law, providing immediate "supplemental appropriations for disaster assistance to meet urgent needs resulting from Hurricane Andrew, Hurricane Iniki, and Typhoon Omar."
- September 25 – President Bush delivers an address to employees of Motorola at the company plant in Schaumburg, Illinois during the afternoon. President Bush delivers an address to the National Technology Initiative Conference in Mandel Hall at the University of Chicago during the afternoon. President Bush delivers an address for his re-election campaign at the Hilton Hotel in Chicago during the afternoon. President Bush announces the nominations of William Lucas for Director of Community Relations Service at the U.S. Department of Justice, and Eric J. Boswell for Director of the Office of Foreign Missions at the State Department.
- September 26 – President Bush gives a speech at the Reed and Frazee Streets railroad tracks in Bowling Green, Ohio during the afternoon. President Bush delivers remarks at the Plymouth train station in Plymouth, Michigan during the evening.
- September 27 – President Bush delivers an address on the observation deck of the Spirit of America train in Wixom, Michigan during the morning.
- September 28 – President Bush gives an address to the East Dallas Renaissance Neighborhood Project at Swiss Avenue in Dallas, Texas during the afternoon.
- September 29 – President Bush delivers a speech at the Roy Acuff Theater in Nashville, Tennessee during the evening.
- September 30 – President Bush gives a speech criticizing the record of Governor Clinton at the Heavy and General Construction Laborers Local 472 union headquarters during the evening. President Bush signs the Tourism Policy and Export Promotion Act of 1992 into law. The Act serves as an authorization for the United States Travel and Tourism Administration.

== October ==
- October 1 – President Bush signs legislation intended to "provide for the continuing operation of the Government for the brief period between now and October 5, 1992" that will be concurrent with annual appropriations.
- October 2 – President Bush releases a statement calling for Congress to pass the national energy strategy prior to it adjourning and details the background of the strategy as well as congressional support for it. President Bush announces the nomination of Sean O'Keefe for United States Secretary of the Navy.
- October 3 – President Bush delivers an address criticizing Clinton at Hollywood International Airport in Fort Lauderdale, Florida during the afternoon. President Bush gives a speech noting what he sees as inconsistencies in Clinton's stated positions on issues at the Church Street Market in Orlando, Florida during the evening. President Bush returns the Cable Television Consumer Protection and Competition Act of 1992 to the Senate and explains his reasons for doing so in a message to the chamber.
- October 5 – President Bush gives an address that includes child care reform and critiquing Clinton on the Green in front of the old statehouse in Dover, Delaware during the afternoon. President Bush signs the Civil War Battlefield Commemorative Coin Act of 1992, enabling the "Secretary of the Treasury to mint coins in commemoration of the 100th anniversary of the beginning of the protection of Civil War battlefields." President Bush announces the nomination of Gerald R. Riso for Chief Financial Officer of the Department of Housing and Urban Development.
- October 6 – President Bush signs the Department of Transportation and Related Agencies Appropriations Act, 1993, which he says contains "funding necessary to maintain and improve our transportation system and to support transportation safety." President Bush announces the nomination of Douglas Alan Brook for Director of the Office of Personnel Management. President Bush announces the appointment of Clifford T. Alderman for Special Assistant to the President for Intergovernmental Affairs.
- October 7 – President Bush attends the initializing ceremony for the North American Free Trade Agreement at the Plaza San Antonio Hotel in San Antonio, Texas during the afternoon. Press Secretary Fitzwater releases a statement expressing President Bush's satisfaction with free parliamentary elections in Kuwait.
- October 8 – President Bush delivers an address critiquing Clinton at the Nashville Avenue Wharf in New Orleans, Louisiana during the afternoon.
- October 9 – President Bush issues a designation of Arlene Holen for the position of Chairman of the Federal Mine Safety and Health Review Commission. President Bush signs the Rocky Mountain Arsenal National Wildlife Refuge Act of 1992, an act that President Bush states will provide "for the future establishment of a national wildlife refuge at the Rocky Mountain Arsenal immediately outside of Denver, Colorado." President Bush delivers an address to the National Fraternal Order of Police at the Holiday Inn Eastgate during the afternoon.
- October 11 – President Bush arrives at Lambert-St. Louis International Airport in St. Louis, Missouri during the afternoon.
- October 13 – President Bush signs the instrument of ratification for the United Nations Framework Convention on Climate Change. Bush states that the Climate Convention is the first step in an international addressing of the issue of climate change and calls on other regions to participate.
- October 14 – President Bush signs the Advisory Council on California Indian Policy Act of 1992. The council has the objective of reviewing the status and federal policies toward California Indian tribes.
- October 15 – President Bush, Ross Perot, and Governor Clinton participate in the Richmond, Virginia presidential debate.
- October 16 – President Bush signs the Dayton Aviation Heritage Preservation Act of 1992, establishing the Ohio-based Dayton Aviation National Historic Park along with the National Park System.
- October 19 – President Bush arrives at the Capital City Airport in Lansing, Michigan during the afternoon. President Bush delivers remarks criticizing the Clinton-Gore ticket at the Lansing Civic Center during the evening.
- October 20 – President Bush delivers an address on the observation deck of the Spirit of America train in Gainesville, Georgia during the afternoon.
- October 21 – President Bush gives a speech criticizing Governor Clinton at the State Fair Grounds in Raleigh, North Carolina during the evening.
- October 22 – President Bush delivers a speech at Seventh Street and Landis Avenue in Vineland, New Jersey during the afternoon. President Bush gives an address at Veterans Memorial Park during the afternoon. President Bush's remarks criticize Clinton's record as Governor of Arkansas and predicts his re-election campaign will be successful.
- October 23 – President Bush delivers an address at South Laurel High School in London, Kentucky during the afternoon. President Bush signs the Wild Bird Conservation Act of 1992, which he says "promotes the conservation of wild exotic birds and provides for other measures related to fish and wildlife conservation."

== November ==
- November 1 – President Bush delivers an address at the Palace of Auburn Hills. The speech critiques the statements made by Democratic nominee Clinton and refers to him being inconsistent on his portrayal of his candidacy.
- November 1 – President Bush delivers an evening address at Sikorsky Memorial Airport in Stratford, Connecticut criticizing the record of Democratic nominee Clinton during his governorship.
- November 2 – President Bush delivers a morning address at the Hartley Dodge Memorial Building in Madison, New Jersey comparing Democratic nominee Clinton to former President Jimmy Carter and touting the record of the administration.
- November 2 – President Bush addresses the Briarcliff Father and Son Athletic Association on his re-election bid.
- November 2 – President Bush signs the High Seas Driftnet Fisheries Enforcement Act into law. The legislation supports United Nations General Assembly Resolutions concerning large-scale dry net fishing and the impact of the activity as it pertains to marine resources.
- November 3 – The 1992 United States presidential election takes place. The Democratic Party presidential nominee Bill Clinton becomes president-elect after defeating President Bush.
- November 18 – President Bush meets with President-elect Bill Clinton in the Oval Office to discuss the transition of power between the presidents.
- November 20 – President Bush announces the Agreement on Agricultural Trade With the European Community during remarks in the Briefing Room.
- November 23 – In a statement responding to the death of Roy Acuff, President Bush praises his musical talents.
- November 24 – President Bush attends the presentation ceremony for the Thanksgiving Turkey in the Rose Garden.
- November 30 – Press Secretary Fitzwater releases a statement on President Bush's telephone conversation with President of Russia Boris Yeltsin and contents of their discussion.
- November 30 – President Bush issues a memorandum on the Commonwealth of Puerto Rico explaining its history and the actions being undertaken by the administration toward it to heads of executive departments and agencies.

== December ==
- December 7 – First Lady Barbara Bush unveils the Christmas decorations at the White House for the fourth and final time.
- December 23 – President Bush delivers brief remarks thanking those who have helped his administration as well as wishing a happy holiday season to those in attendance in the South Lawn during the morning.
- December 24 – President Bush issues pardons to six people, including former Defense Secretary Caspar Weinberger, for their role in the Iran–Contra affair.
- December 29 – President Bush is announced to have recess appointed Brian C. Griffin for Chairman of the Administrative Conference of the United States.
- December 30 – President Bush announces the completion of discussions of agreements on START II and that formal work on the text of the treaty was being completed by American and Russian experts in Geneva in the Rose Garden during the morning. Bush also answers questions from reporters on Somalia, Serbia, and the START II treaty. President Bush issues a memorandum on delegations of authority as it pertains to Soviet Republics. President Bush is announced to have recess-appointed Stephen T. Hart for an Assistant Secretary of Transportation for Public Affairs.

== January 1993 ==
- January 3 – The 103rd United States Congress begins.
- January 3 – President Bush signs the START II Treaty.

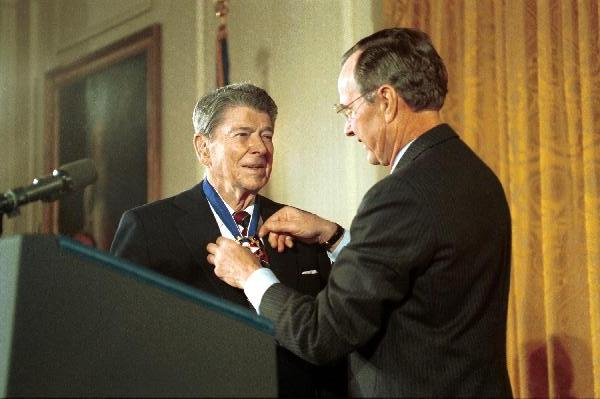
Former President Ronald Reagan receives Presidential Medal of Freedom

- January 6 – In a joint session of the United States Congress, the results for the electoral college are counted. In his role as President of the Senate, Vice President Dan Quayle reads the results and declares President-elect Bill Clinton as the winner of the 1992 presidential election.
- January 13 – President Bush presents former President Ronald Reagan with the Presidential Medal of Freedom.
- January 20 – President Bush receives and greets President-elect Bill Clinton, who arrived at the White House, for the formal transition of power in the United States. He is accompanied by First Lady Barbara Bush.
- January 20 – Vice President Dan Quayle receives and greets Vice President-elect Al Gore, who arrived at the White House. During the ceremony, he is accompanied by the second lady Marilyn Quayle.
- January 20 – President Bush completes his full term in office and leaves the White House for the final time as Commander-in-chief.
- January 20 – Bill Clinton is inaugurated as the 42nd president of the United States, at noon EST.
- January 20 – After the inauguration, Bush, now the former president, returns to Houston to begin his post-presidency.

== See also ==
- Timeline of the George H. W. Bush presidency, for an index of the Bush presidency timeline articles

U.S. presidential administration timelines
Preceded by Bush presidency (1991)	Bush presidency (1992–1993)	Succeeded by Clinton presidency (1993)
