= Post-presidency of George Bush =

Post-presidency of George Bush may refer to:

- Post-presidency of George H. W. Bush (1993-2018)
- Post-presidency of George W. Bush (2009-present)
