= Post-presidency of George H. W. Bush =

Actions of U.S. President George H. W. Bush after leaving office

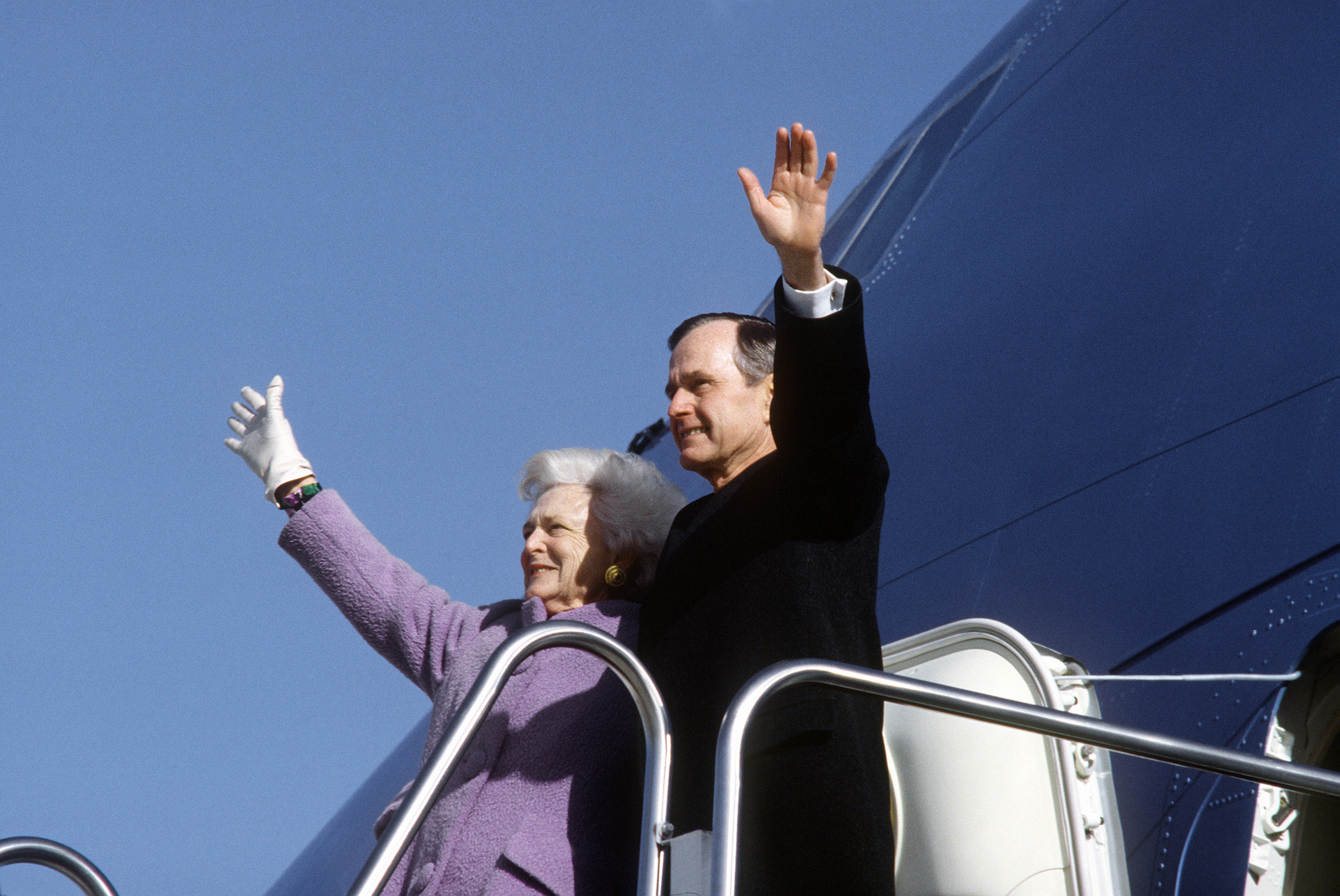
Former President George H. W. Bush and former First Lady Barbara Bush wave from the departing aircraft after the inauguration of Bill Clinton on January 20, 1993

On January 20, 1993, following the first inauguration of his successor Bill Clinton, George H. W. Bush and his wife Barbara Bush built a retirement house in the community of West Oaks, Houston. He established a presidential office within the Park Laureate Building on Memorial Drive in Houston. He also frequently spent time at his vacation home in Kennebunkport, took annual cruises in Greece, went on fishing trips in Florida, and visited the Bohemian Club in Northern California. He declined to serve on corporate boards, but delivered numerous paid speeches and served as an adviser to The Carlyle Group, a private equity firm. He never published his memoirs, but he and Brent Scowcroft co-wrote A World Transformed, a 1998 work on foreign policy. Portions of his letters and his diary were later published as The China Diary of George H. W. Bush and All the Best, George Bush.

During his post-presidency, his sons George and Jeb became governors of Texas and Florida, respectively. With the victory of George in the 2000 presidential election, the two became the second father–son pair to serve as the nation's president, following John Adams and John Quincy Adams. In his retirement, Bush used the public spotlight to support various charities. Despite earlier political differences with Bill Clinton, the two former presidents eventually became friends. They appeared together in television ads, encouraging aid for victims of the 2004 Indian Ocean earthquake and tsunami and Hurricane Katrina. However, when interviewed by Jon Meacham, Bush criticized Donald Rumsfeld, Dick Cheney, and even his own son George W. Bush for their handling of foreign policy after the September 11 attacks. George H. W. Bush remained active in charity works and as a speaker on political issues, and represented the United States in delegations to inaugurations and funerals around the world. Barbara Bush died on April 17, 2018, after 73 years of marriage. Bush's post-presidency ended when he died on November 30, 2018.

== 1990s ==
=== First Clinton term (1993–1997) ===
Upon leaving office, Bush retired with his wife, Barbara, and temporarily moved into a friend's house near the Tanglewood community of Houston as they prepared to build a permanent retirement house nearby. Ultimately they built their retirement house in the community of West Oaks, near Tanglewood. They had a presidential office within the Park Laureate Building on Memorial Drive. Mimi Swartz of National Geographic wrote that "The Bushes are too studiously sedate to live in River Oaks". They spent their summers at Walker's Point in Kennebunkport, Maine.

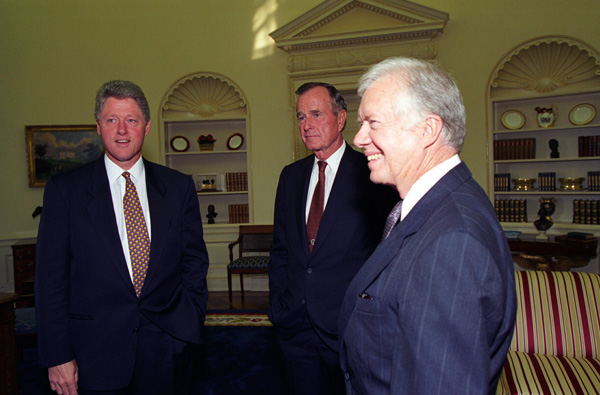
President Bill Clinton meeting with former presidents George H.W. Bush and Jimmy Carter at the White House in September 1993

In 1993, Bush was targeted in an assassination plot when he visited Kuwait to commemorate the coalition's victory over Iraq in the Gulf War. Kuwaiti authorities arrested 17 people who were allegedly involved in using a car bomb in an attempt to kill Bush. Through interviews with the suspects and examinations of the bomb's circuitry and wiring, the FBI established that the plot had been directed by the Iraqi Intelligence Service. A Kuwaiti court later convicted all but one of the defendants. Two months later, Clinton retaliated when he ordered the firing of 23 cruise missiles at Iraqi Intelligence Service headquarters in Baghdad. The day before the strike, U.S. ambassador to the United Nations Madeleine Albright went before the Security Council to present evidence of the Iraqi plot. After the missiles were fired, Vice President Al Gore said the attack "was intended to be a proportionate response at the place where this plot" to assassinate Bush "was hatched and implemented".

In September 1993, Bush and other living former presidents were invited back to the White House for the signing of the Oslo I Accord. They also made the case to Clinton for a repeal of NAFTA.

On April 22, 1994, Bush attended the funeral of former president Richard Nixon.

In the 1994 gubernatorial elections, his sons George W. and Jeb concurrently ran for Governor of Texas and Governor of Florida. The elder Bush frequently telephoned their respective campaign headquarters for updates on the races. George W. won his race against Ann Richards while Jeb lost to Lawton Chiles. After the results came in, the elder Bush told ABC, "I have very mixed emotions. Proud father, is the way I would sum it all up." Jeb would again run for governor of Florida in 1998 and win at the same time that his brother George W. won re-election in Texas. It marked the second time in United States history that a pair of brothers served simultaneously as governors.

From 1993 to 1999, he served as the chairman of the board of trustees for Eisenhower Fellowships, and from 2007 to 2009 was chairman of the National Constitution Center.

On September 28, 1994, Bush said he was opposed to sending American troops to Haiti, citing his loss of confidence in President of Haiti Jean-Bertrand Aristide while speaking to business and civic leaders in Houston.

In an October 22, 1994, speech in Cancún, Mexico, Bush said history would vindicate him for not attempting to force Saddam Hussein out of power while in office: "The Mideast peace talks that offer hope to the world would never have started if we had done that. The Arabs would never have talked to us."

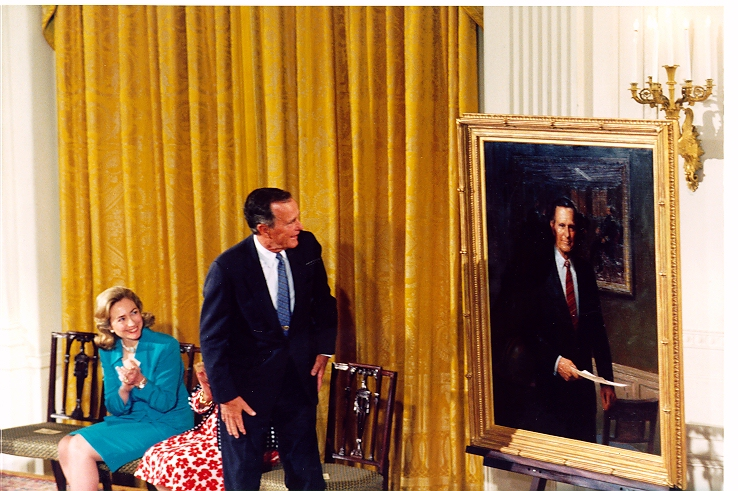
The unveiling of an official portrait of George H. W. Bush at the East Room of the White House, 1995

On July 17, 1995, Bush returned to the White House for the unveiling of his official portrait in an East Room ceremony attended by former members of his administration.

On September 21, 1995, Bush met with President of Vietnam Lê Đức Anh and party secretary Đỗ Mười in Vietnam. On September 2, Bush and his son George W. participated in a parade commemorating World War II in Fredericksburg, Texas, where the elder Bush reasoned the United States had become united in the aftermath of the attack on Pearl Harbor and stressed America would have to stay involved in world affairs to continue its unity.

On July 26, 1996, Bush met with Republican presidential candidate Bob Dole and pledged he would do everything in his power to aid in securing a victory for Dole in the upcoming presidential election. The two met again in October while Dole was preparing for upcoming debates with President Clinton. Bush's experience with debating Clinton prompted Dole to seek out his advice.

=== Second Clinton term (1997–2001) ===
On February 8, 1997, Bush endorsed the chemical weapon banning treaty supported by United States Secretary of State Madeleine Albright, saying the United States would need to approve the treaty ahead of the April deadline.

On April 4, 1997, Bush gave a speech at a convocation of a weekend conference analyzing his presidency and joined President Bill Clinton, former president Ford, and Nancy Reagan in signing the "Summit Declaration of Commitment" in advocating for participation by private citizens in solving domestic issues within the United States. Also on April 4, the Houston Intercontinental Airport was renamed George Bush Intercontinental Airport after a proposal received the unanimous approval of the Houston City Council. The renaming took effect on May 2, with Bush presiding over the ceremonies as he took a 50-minute flight during the official changeover.

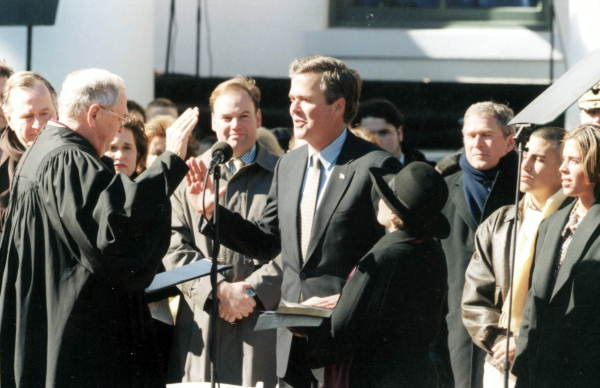
Inauguration ceremony of Jeb Bush in January 1999

On August 10, 1997, Bush agreed to be interviewed by The New York Times, as long as he would not be portrayed as giving credit to himself over the balanced budget deal that was composed by President Clinton and House Speaker Newt Gingrich. During a telephone interview, he stated his belief that history would show that his administration laid the groundwork for the agreement.

President Bush was Honorary Chairman of Points of Light, an international nonprofit dedicated to engaging more people and resources in solving serious social problems through voluntary service.

On September 14, 1998, A World Transformed, a book Bush and Brent Scowcroft co-wrote about foreign policy was released, and on October 5, 1999, Bush released All the Best, George Bush, a book made up of a collection of letters, diary entries, and memos.

On January 18, 1999, Bush spoke in the Old Senate chamber as part of a lecture series for Senators in an address warning against the collapse of political decorum and invasions into the privacy of individuals.

On February 26, 1999, Bush was part of the American delegation to the funeral of King Hussein of Jordan in Amman.

On April 6, 1999, Bush called for the release of former Chilean dictator Augusto Pinochet when Spain had him arrested and sought to try him for human rights violations.

On May 23, 1999, Bush and his wife Barbara honored six senior citizens during the annual Ageless Heroes honors in Chicago, Illinois.

== 2000s ==
=== First George W. Bush term (2001–2005) ===
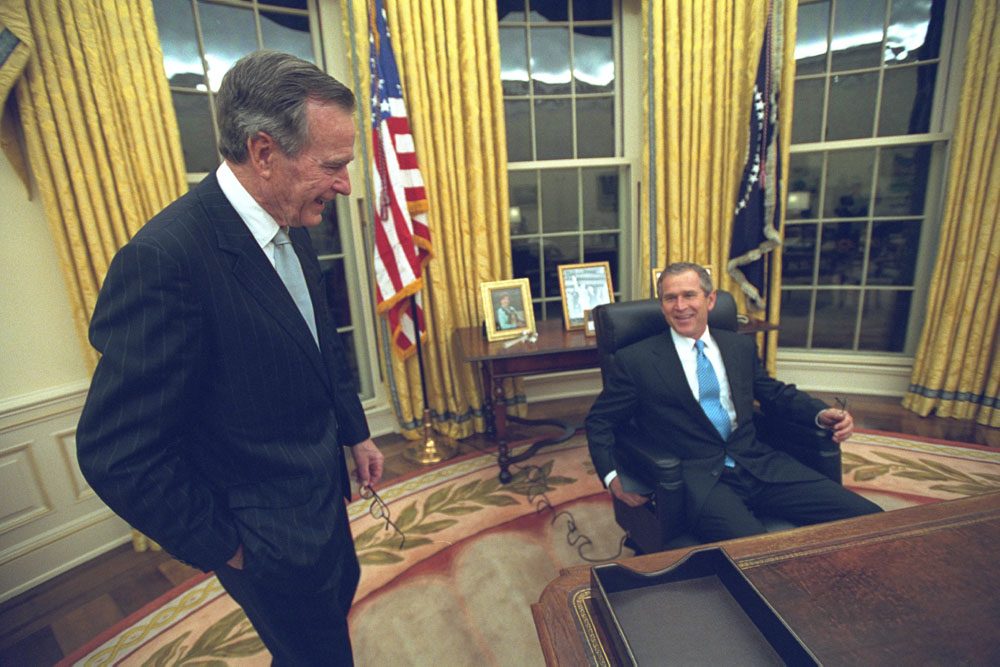
George H. W. Bush (left) and his son George W. Bush in the Oval Office, January 2001

His eldest son, George W. Bush, was inaugurated as the 43rd president of the United States on January 20, 2001, and re-elected in 2004. Through previous administrations, the elder Bush had ubiquitously been known as "George Bush" or "President Bush", but following his son's election the need to distinguish between them has made retronymic forms such as "George H. W. Bush" and "George Bush Sr." and colloquialisms such as "Bush 41" and "Bush the Elder" became much more common. H.W. Bush was traveling to Minnesota for a speaking engagement on the day of the September 11 attacks. George W. made multiple calls to get in contact with his father before the two men reconnected after the elder Bush had gone to a Brookfield, Wisconsin, motel. Bush told biographer Jon Meacham that his son's vice president, Dick Cheney, underwent a change following the September 11 attacks: "His seeming knuckling under to the real hard-charging guys who want to fight about everything, use force to get our way in the Middle East."

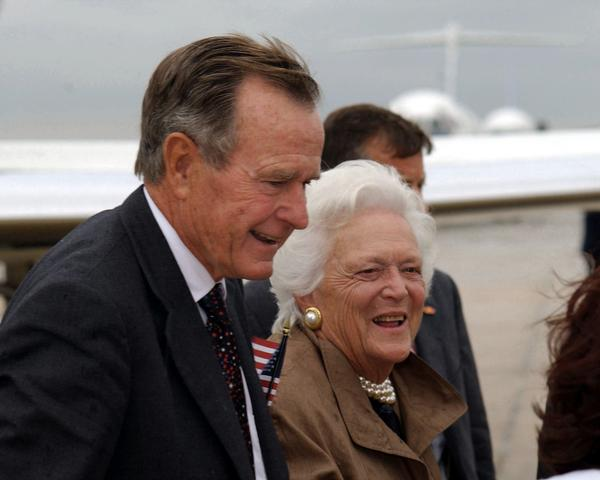
George and Barbara Bush, 2001

On December 6, 2002, George W. sought counsel from the elder Bush regarding Iraq and informed him of "my efforts to rally the Saudis, Jordanians, Turks, and others in the Middle East".

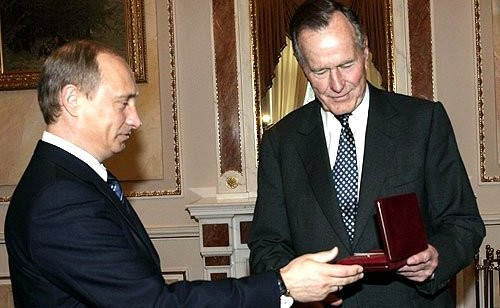
Bush (right) with Russian president Vladimir Putin as he receives the Jubilee Medal "60 Years of Victory in the Great Patriotic War 1941–1945" from Putin in 2005.

Following the fall of Baghdad, Bush praised George W. in an April 2003 email to the incumbent president. In a September 14, 2003, interview with BBC, Bush stated his support for a continuation of his son's war against terrorism and that the U.S. was in a better state in terms of protecting itself from terrorism than two years prior. While visiting Houston VA Medical Center on December 17, Bush told reporters of his satisfaction with the capture of Saddam Hussein.

President and Mrs. Bush attended the state funeral of Ronald Reagan on June 5, 2004, and of Gerald Ford on December 26, 2006. One month later, he was awarded the Ronald Reagan Freedom Award in Beverly Hills, California, by former First Lady Nancy Reagan. In April 2007, Bush and former president Bill Clinton spoke together at the funeral of Russian president Boris Yeltsin.

Despite Bush's political differences with Bill Clinton, reports acknowledged that the two former presidents had become friends. In the aftermath of the 2004 Indian Ocean earthquake and tsunami and Hurricane Katrina, Bush established, with fellow former president Clinton, the Bush-Clinton Tsunami Fund and the Bush-Clinton Katrina Fund, respectively, for which they were awarded the 2006 Philadelphia Liberty Medal on October 5, 2006. He and Clinton appeared together in television ads in 2005, encouraging aid for victims of the tsunami and Hurricane Katrina.

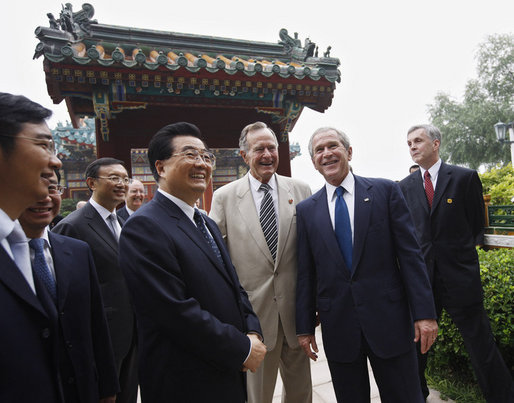
George H. W. Bush with son George W. Bush and China's president Hu Jintao in Beijing, People's Republic of China, August 10, 2008

On October 5, 2004, Bush endorsed Pete Sessions and Ted Poe in Texas congressional races.

=== Second George W. Bush term (2005–2009) ===
On February 20, 2006, Bush delivered a eulogy at the funeral of Coretta Scott King.

On March 2, 2006, President Bush announced that his father would lead the American delegation to the inauguration of the president-elect of the Republic of Portugal Aníbal Cavaco Silva.

On September 29, 2006, Bush campaigned for New Jersey Senate candidate Thomas Kean Jr., praising him as well as stating his respect for Kean for calling on the resignation of U.S. defense secretary Donald Rumsfeld. Kean went on to lose the election. The following month, he was honored by the National Italian American Foundation (NIAF) with the NIAF One America Award for fundraising, with Bill Clinton, for the victims of the 2004 Indian Ocean earthquake and tsunami and Hurricane Katrina.

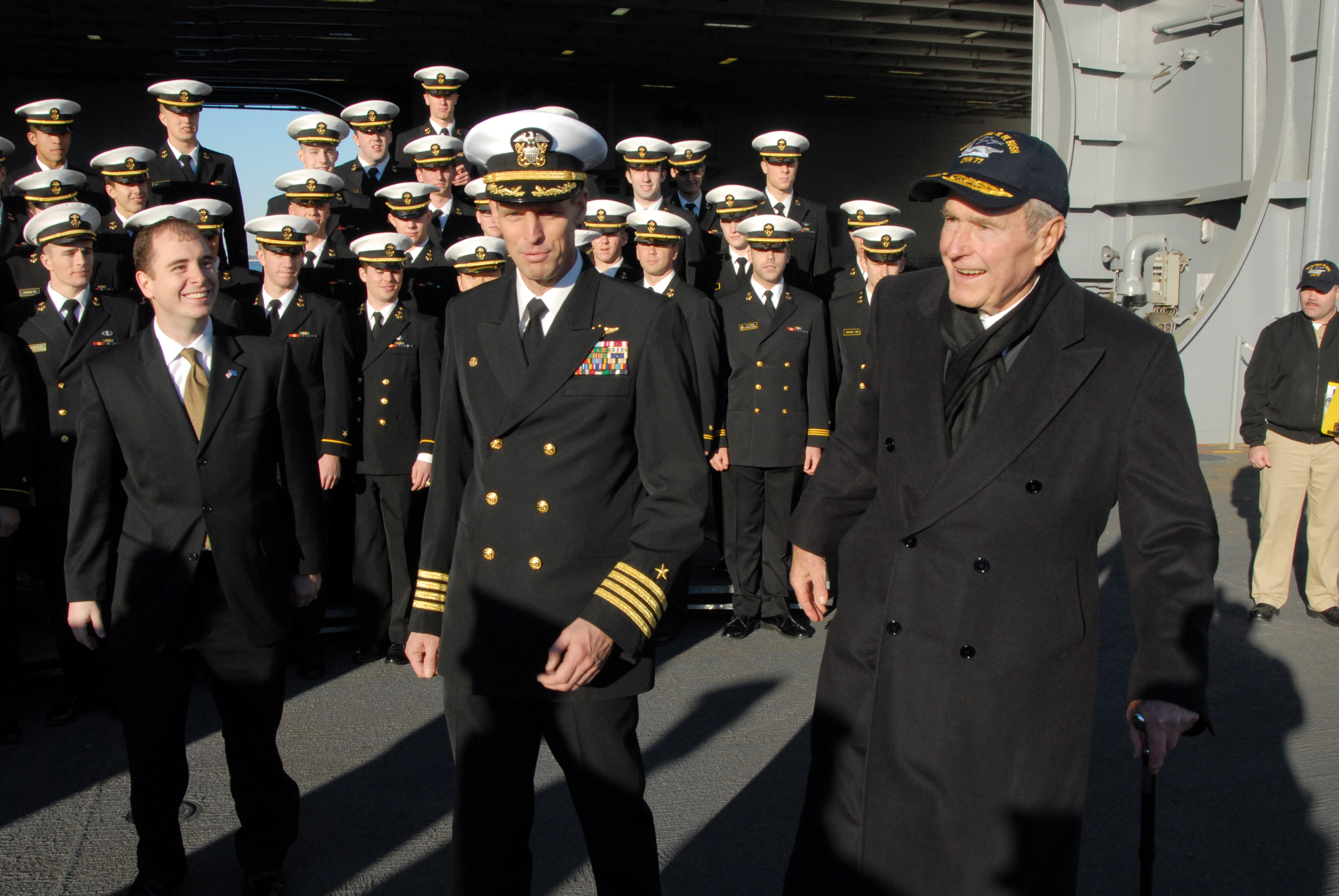
Capt. Kevin E. O'Flaherty, commanding officer of the aircraft carrier USS George H.W. Bush, escorts former president George H. W. Bush, 2009

On February 18, 2008, Bush formally endorsed Senator John McCain for President of the United States. The endorsement offered a boost to McCain's campaign, because the Arizona Senator had been facing criticism among many conservatives. During a trip to Tokyo, Japan, Bush said that he would campaign vigorously against Senator Hillary Clinton if she were to initiate a presidential bid.

On March 26, 2008, Bush met with President of China Hu Jintao, who praised Bush for his attempts at harmonizing relations between the U.S. and China.

During an address at the University of Kansas on November 16, 2008, Bush said that President-elect Obama would encounter diverse issues upon taking office and experience a wave of enthusiasm.

On January 10, 2009, George H. W. and George W. Bush were both present at the commissioning of USS George H.W. Bush (CVN-77), the tenth and last Nimitz-class supercarrier of the United States Navy. Bush paid a visit to the carrier again on May 26, 2009.

== 2010s ==
=== First Obama term (2009–2013) ===
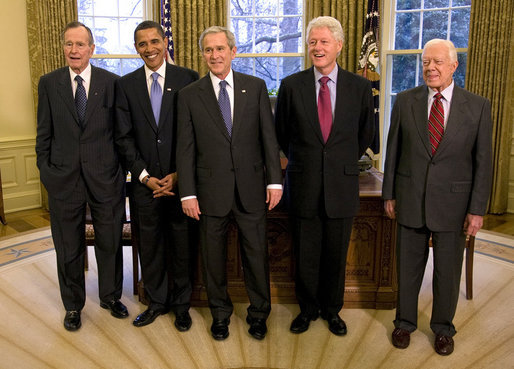
Former presidents Bush, Clinton, and Carter meets with President-elect Barack Obama and President George W. Bush in the Oval Office on January 7, 2009; Obama formally took office thirteen days later.

On October 8, 2009, Bush joined President Barack Obama onstage at Texas A&M University for a promotion of volunteering.

On February 15, 2011, he was awarded the Presidential Medal of Freedom—the highest civilian honor in the United States—by President Barack Obama. Later that year, Bush, an avid golfer, was inducted in the World Golf Hall of Fame.

On March 29, 2012, Bush endorsed Mitt Romney for the Republican presidential nomination in the 2012 presidential election. NBC News reported that Bush had chosen to support Romney three months prior.

Bush suffered from vascular parkinsonism, a form of Parkinson's disease which had forced him to use a motorized scooter or wheelchair since at least 2012. Then, in July 2015, he suffered a severe neck injury from a fall at his home in Maine. Even so, in October that year, he had recovered enough that he was able to throw out the ceremonial first pitch for the Houston Astros at Minute Maid Park.

=== Second Obama term (2013–2017) ===
On July 11, 2013, Bush had his head shaved in a show of support for the two-year-old son of a member of his security detail, who had leukemia. On July 7, Bush met with Gabrielle Giffords for part of her week-long Rights and Responsibilities Tour advocating expanded background checks in relation to firearm purchases.

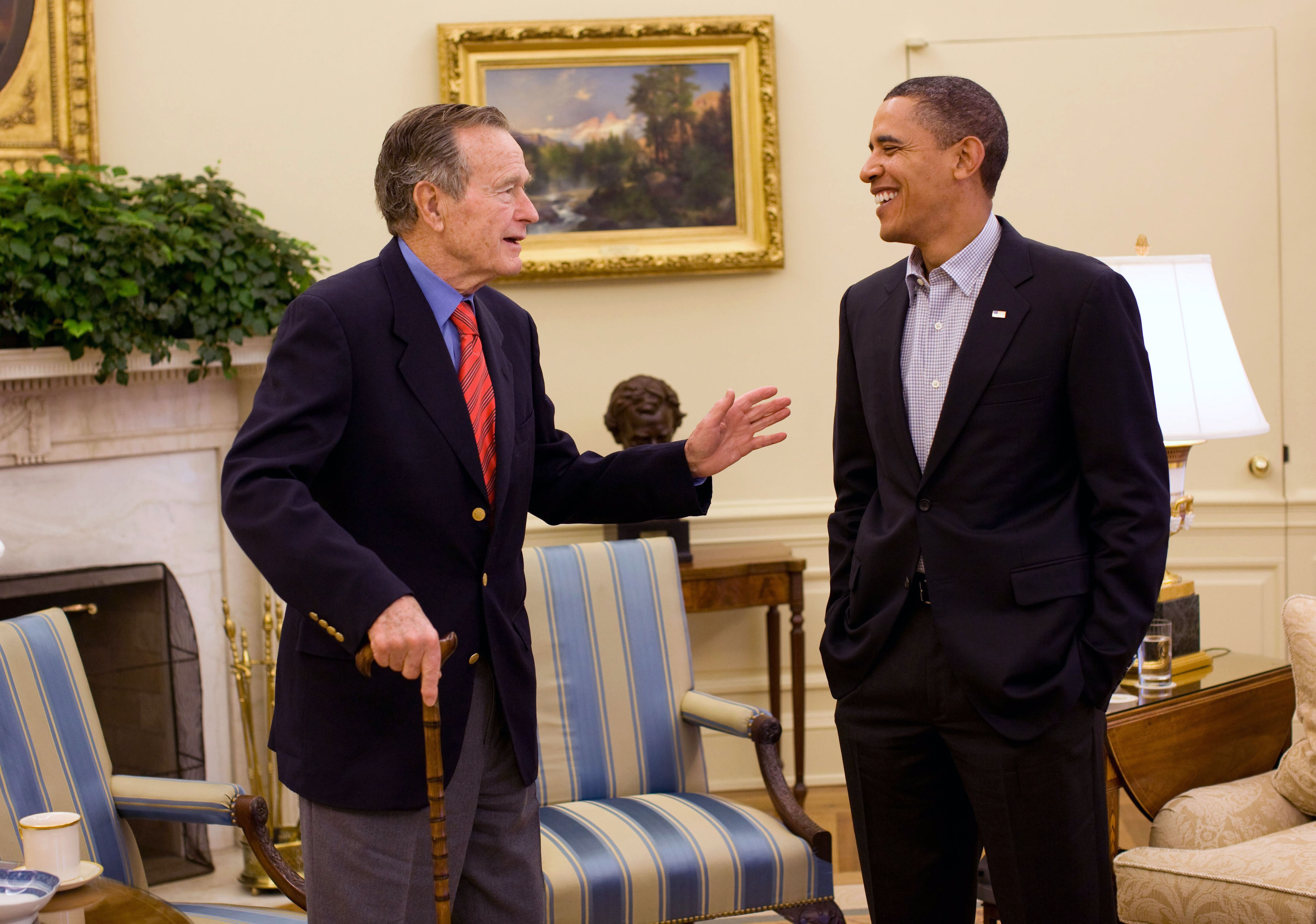
Bush meets President Barack Obama in the Oval Office, January 30, 2010

On April 25, 2014, Frederick D. McClure, chief executive of the Bush library foundation, organized a three-day gathering in College Park, Texas, to mark the 25th anniversary of the Bush administration. Also in early 2014, the John F. Kennedy Library Foundation presented the Profile in Courage Award to Bush and Mount Vernon awarded him its first Cyrus A. Ansary Prize. The Kennedy foundation award was presented by Jack Schlossberg, the late president's grandson, to Lauren Bush Lauren, who accepted on her grandfather's behalf. The Ansary prize was presented in Houston with Ansary, Barbara Lucas, Ryan C. Crocker, dean of the Bush school since January 2010, Barbara Bush, and Curt Viebranz in attendance with the former president. Bush directed $50,000 of the prize to the Bush School of Government and Public Service at Texas A&M University, and $25,000 to fund an animation about the Siege of Yorktown for Mount Vernon. Viebranz and Lucas represented Mount Vernon at the presentation.

On June 12, 2014, Bush fulfilled a long-standing promise by skydiving on his 90th birthday. He made the parachute jump from a helicopter near his home at 11:15 a.m. in Kennebunkport, Maine. The jump marked the eighth time the past president skydived, including jumps on his 80th and 85th birthday as well. He tweeted about the incident prior to the jump, saying "It's a wonderful day in Maine — in fact, nice enough for a parachute jump."

On December 7, 2016, Bush and former senator Bob Dole commemorated the 75th anniversary of the attack on Pearl Harbor by appearing at the Bush School of Government and Public Service at Texas A&M University.

=== Trump term and final years (2017–2018) ===
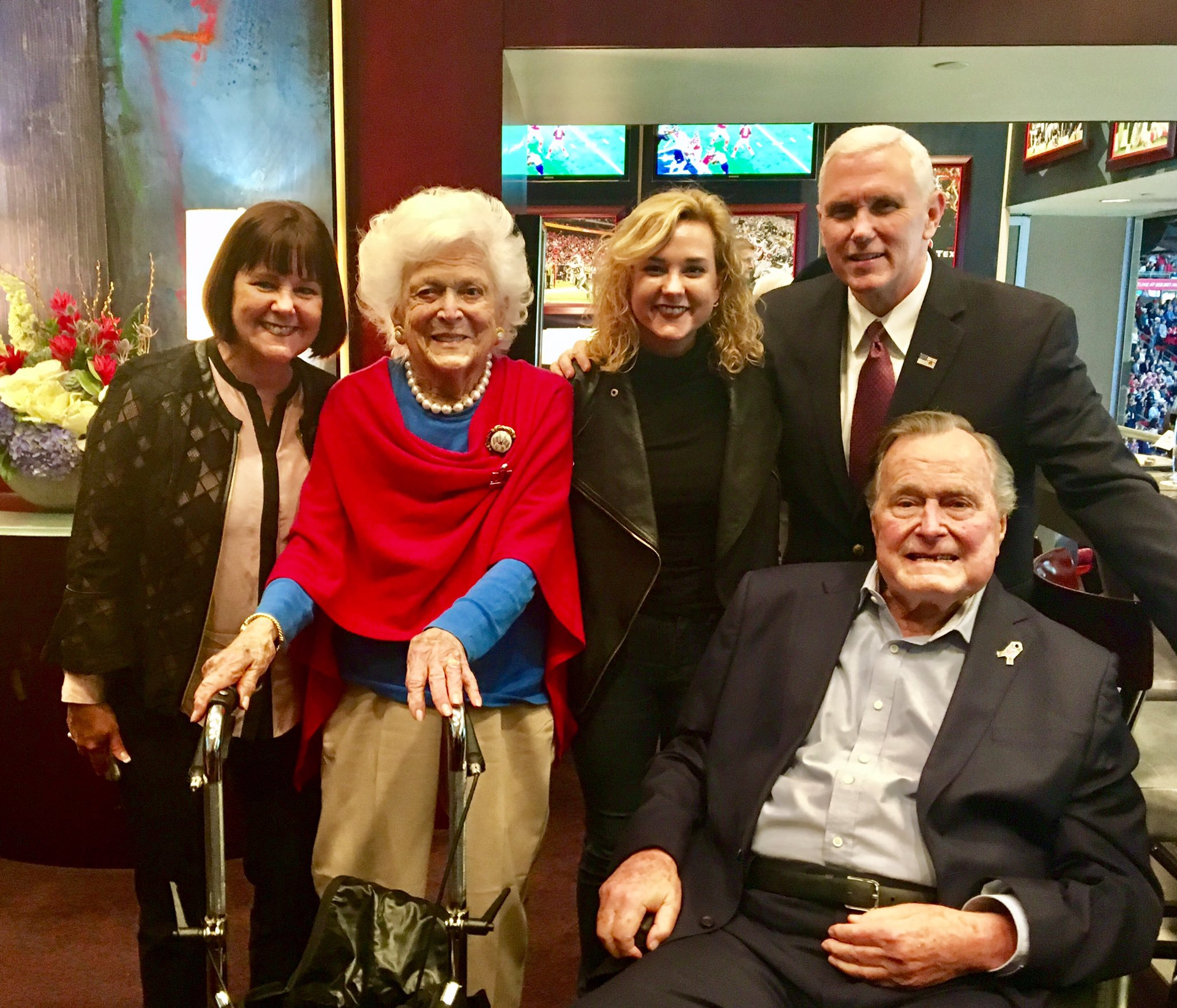
The Bushes with Vice President Mike Pence and family, wife Karen and daughter Charlotte, at Super Bowl LI in 2017

Bush supported his younger son Jeb's 2016 presidential campaign. Jeb Bush's campaign struggled however, and he withdrew from the race during the primaries. Neither George H.W. nor George W. Bush endorsed the eventual Republican nominee, Donald Trump; all three Bushes emerged as frequent critics of Trump's policies and speaking style, while Trump frequently criticized George W. Bush's presidency. George H. W. Bush later said that he voted for the Democratic nominee, Hillary Clinton, in the general election. After Trump won the election, Bush sent him a congratulatory message.

Due to his hospitalization, both George and Barbara Bush were unable to attend the inauguration of Donald Trump. Bush wrote a letter to Trump wishing him well, writing “I want you to know that I wish you the very best as you begin this incredible journey of leading our great country,” he continued. “If I can ever be of help, please let me know.”

On February 5, 2017, George and Barbara Bush participated in the coin toss for Super Bowl LI.

On August 16, 2017, Bush and his son George W. released a joint statement in which they condemned the violence at the Unite the Right rally.

On September 7, 2017, Bush partnered with former presidents Carter, Clinton, George W. Bush, and Obama to work with One America Appeal to help the victims of Hurricane Harvey and Hurricane Irma in the Gulf Coast and Texas communities.

On April 22, 2018, the day after his wife's funeral, Bush was hospitalized with a blood infection. The infection led to sepsis. One month later, he was briefly hospitalized again, after experiencing fatigue and low blood pressure.

After his wife's death in April 2018, Bush released a statement through his spokesman, saying in part, "We have faith she is in heaven, and we know life will go on — as she would have it. So, cross the Bushes off your worry list." On the day of his death, his friend James Baker told Bush that he was going to heaven. Bush replied "Good. That's where I want to go."

On October 27, 2017, during the Me Too movement, actress Heather Lind accused Bush of groping her and telling an inappropriate joke. Several other women subsequently made similar allegations. Bush apologized for these incidents through his spokesman, Jim McGrath. At the time, an editorial writer for the Washington Post noted that some would relate his behavior to his vascular parkinsonism or other senility related conditions due to his advanced age.

On December 5, 2018, the nonprofit Compassion International, revealed that Bush secretly sponsored a boy in the Philippines for ten years using a pseudonym. He sponsored the boy from 2002 until 2012, personally writing to Timothy using the name George Walker. Timothy only found out who his sponsor had been after he graduated from the program at 17.

== Death and funeral ==
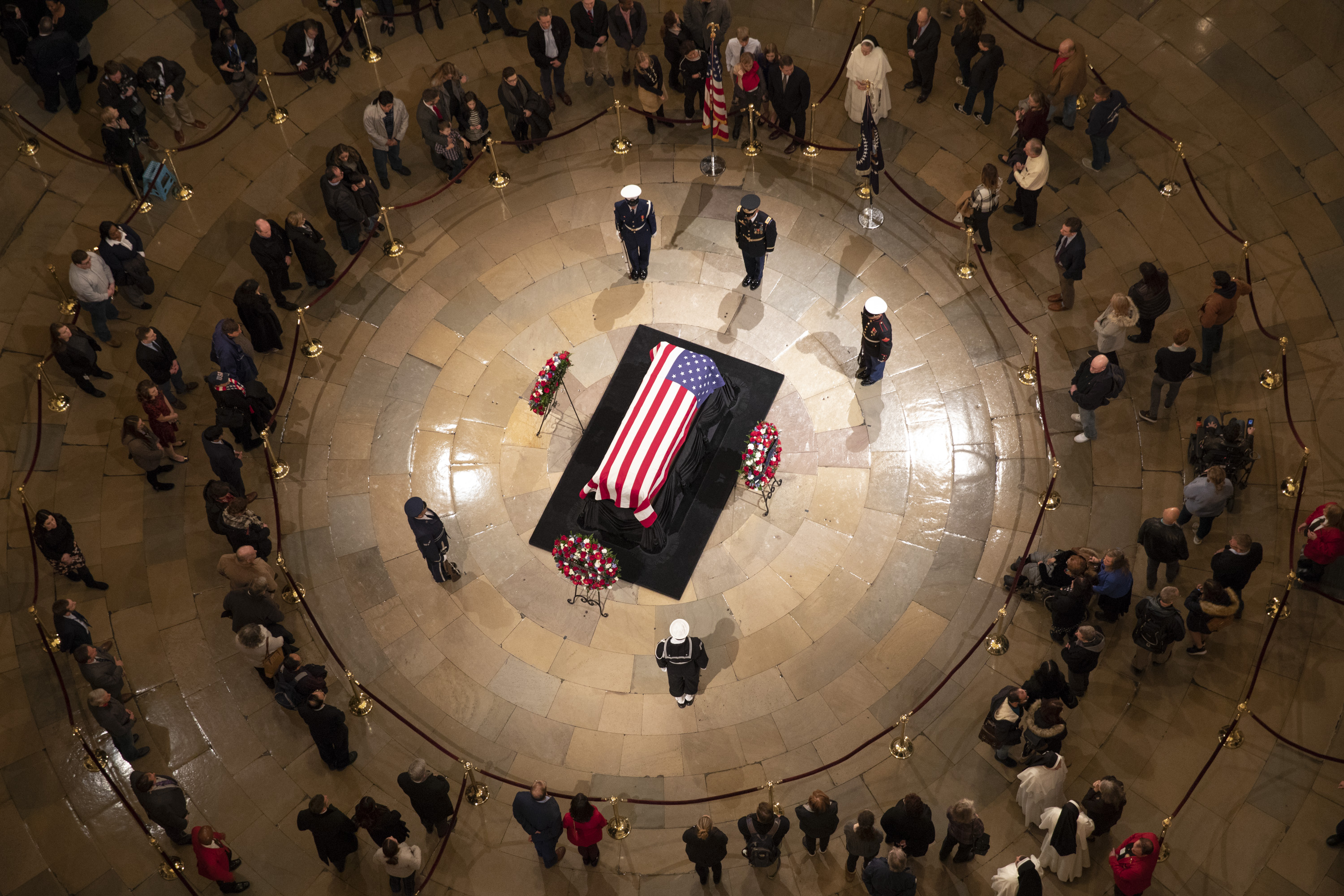
Members of the public pay their respects at the casket of George H. W. Bush lying in state in the Rotunda of the U.S. Capitol in Washington, D.C.

George H. W. Bush died on November 30, 2018, aged 94 years, 171 days, at his home in Houston. At the time of his death he was the longest-lived U.S. president, a distinction now held (since March 22, 2019) by Jimmy Carter. He was also the third-oldest vice president (The longest-lived U.S. vice president is John Nance Garner, who died on November 7, 1967, 15 days short of his 99th birthday).

Bush lay in state in the Rotunda of the U.S. Capitol from December 3 through December 5; he was the 12th U.S. president to be accorded this honor. Then, on December 5, Bush's casket was transferred from the Capitol rotunda to Washington National Cathedral where a state funeral was held. Former president George W. Bush eulogized his father saying,

"He looked for the good in each person, and he usually found it."

Former Canadian prime minister Brian Mulroney (1984–1993) said,

"I believe it will be said that no occupant of the Oval Office was more courageous, more principled and more honorable than George Herbert Walker Bush".

Presidential historian Jon Meacham also gave a eulogy for the former president in which he stated, "George Herbert Walker Bush, who survived that fiery fall into the waters of the Pacific three quarters of a century ago, so that he could make our lives and the lives of nations freer, better, warmer, and nobler."

Afterward, Bush's casket was flown back to Houston and then transported to St. Martin's Episcopal Church where a second service was held on December 6. Following this his casket was brought by train to the George H.W. Bush Presidential Library in College Station, Texas where he was buried next to his wife Barbara and daughter Robin.

=== Tributes ===
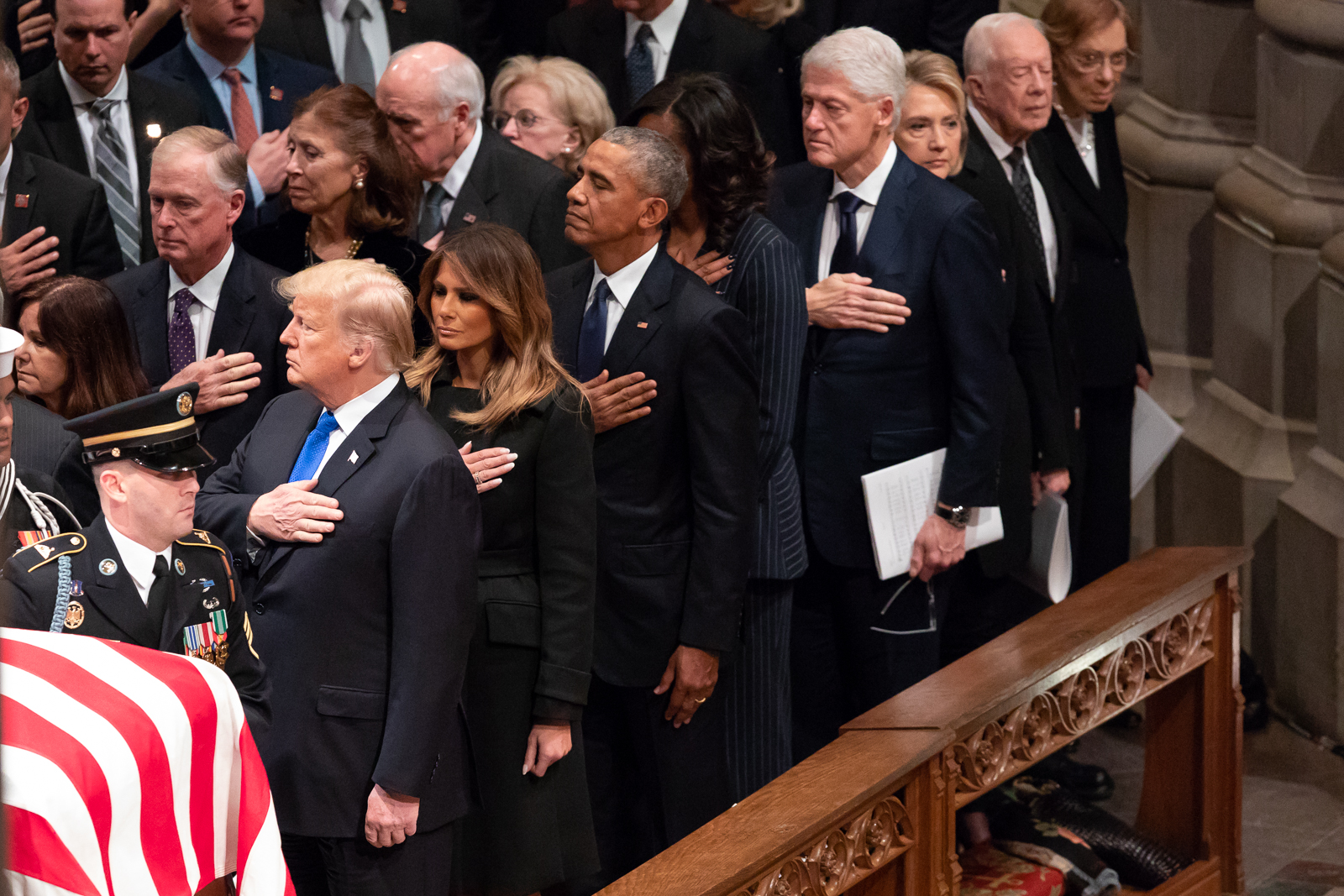
Then-President Trump, former presidents Obama, Clinton, and Carter at the state funeral of Bush on December 5, 2018

Former president Obama released a lengthy statement, reading in part: "America has lost a patriot and humble servant in George Herbert Walker Bush. While our hearts are heavy today, they are also filled with gratitude. Our thoughts are with the entire Bush family tonight – and all who were inspired by George and Barbara's example." Former First Lady Michelle Obama cancelled her book tour out of respect to Bush.

Former president Clinton, in a statement, described Bush's long record of service in the military, Congress, the CIA and as president, where he served from 1989 to 1993. "He never stopped serving," Clinton said. "I am profoundly grateful for every minute I spent with President Bush and will always hold our friendship as one of my life's greatest gifts." Former secretary of state Hillary Clinton tweeted; "George H.W. Bush was a beloved father & grandfather, a war hero, a public servant, & a class act. In my experiences w/ him, I always valued his desire to listen, look at evidence & ask for ideas, even from people w/ different beliefs. My heart goes out to the entire Bush family".

Former president Carter said Bush's administration "was marked by grace, civility and social conscience." The Democrat added that through the Points of Light initiative that Bush founded, which promotes volunteerism, he embraced "a uniquely American volunteer spirit and bipartisan support." Colin Powell in an interview with NPR, who served as chairman of the Joint Chiefs of Staff under Bush, called the former president "the most qualified president to take over that office in our history."

Queen Elizabeth II released a lengthy statement saying in part, "It was with sadness that I learned of the death of President George H W Bush last night. Prince Philip and I remember our days in Texas in 1991 with great fondness. My thoughts and prayers are with President Bush's family and the American people." German chancellor Angela Merkel called Bush – who was U.S. president during the 1989 fall of the Berlin Wall – "one of the fathers of German reunification, and we will never forget that."

Ellen DeGeneres tweeted, "I will never forget George H.W. Bush and President Clinton meeting me in my old hometown of New Orleans to show support and raise money after Hurricane Katrina. I send my love to his family tonight." At the 2018 Kennedy Center Honors, host Gloria Estefan paused the show to acknowledge the recent death of Bush. She also shared a personal story in which he shared his kindness to her and her son. She noted that Bush was a "wonderful man who dedicated his life to service and who graciously attended this event many times during his administration". The entire theatre applauded and in tribute to Bush gave him a standing ovation.

On Saturday Night Live, during the Weekend Update segment, Colin Jost and Michael Che paid tribute to Bush by saying, "President Bush was famously a warm and gracious man who always understood the power of being able to laugh at yourself", before cutting to a clip package of Dana Carvey's impersonation of the president. Carvey said "It was an honor and a privilege to know and spend time with George H.W. Bush for over 25 years. When I think of those times what I remember most is how hard we would laugh. I will miss my friend."

On The Late Show with Stephen Colbert, Colbert honored "the last president from the greatest generation" saying, "The 41st President was known for the kindness and respect he showed to even his political rivals...we may never see the likes of that again" Later Colbert asked Sen. Bernie Sanders, who was on the show about the death of Bush, to which Sanders replied "Of course I disagreed with him [H.W. Bush], but he was an honest man, he was a decent man, he loved his country very much...we wish that we could have a president who was honest back in the White House again."
