= A World Transformed =

1998 book by George H. W. Bush and Brent Scowcroft

- Author: George H. W. Bush; Brent Scowcroft
- Language: English
- Publisher: Knopf
- Publication date: September 14, 1998
- Publication place: United States
- Pages: 587
- ISBN: 978-0679432487

A World Transformed is a 1998 book (ISBN 0-679-43248-5) by George H. W. Bush, the 41st president of the United States, and Brent Scowcroft, Bush's national security advisor. The book documents foreign relations during the Bush administration.

They explained in 1998 why they failed to go to Baghdad and remove Saddam Hussein's government from power in 1991 during the Gulf War:

While we hoped that popular revolt or coup would topple Saddam, neither the U.S. nor the countries of the region wished to see the breakup of the Iraqi state. We were concerned about the long-term balance of power at the head of the Persian Gulf. Trying to eliminate Saddam, extending the ground war into an occupation of Iraq, would have violated our guideline about not changing objectives in midstream, engaging in "mission creep," and would have incurred incalculable human and political costs. Apprehending him was probably impossible. We had been unable to find Noriega in Panama, which we knew intimately. We would have been forced to occupy Baghdad and, in effect, rule Iraq. The coalition would instantly have collapsed, the Arabs deserting it in anger and other allies pulling out as well. Under those circumstances, furthermore, we had been self-consciously trying to set a pattern for handling aggression in the post-cold war world. Going in and occupying Iraq, thus unilaterally exceeding the U.N.'s mandate, would have destroyed the precedent of international response to aggression we hoped to establish. Had we gone the invasion route, the U.S. could conceivably still be an occupying power in a bitterly hostile land. It would have been a dramatically different--and perhaps barren--outcome.
