= All the Best (book) =

1999 compilation of writings by George H. W. Bush

All the Best: My Life in Letters and Other Writings
- Author: George H. W. Bush
- Language: English
- Genre: Memoir
- Publication date: October 5, 1999
- Publication place: United States
- ISBN: 978-1501106675

All the Best: My Life in Letters and Other Writings is a 1999 compilation of writings by former U.S. President George H. W. Bush. The book is a collection of letters, diary entries, and memos, in the structure of an autobiography. The letters begin during Bush's service as a pilot in the United States Navy during World War II, and end shortly after Bush's son Jeb's election as Governor of Florida in 1998.

== See also ==
- List of autobiographies by presidents of the United States
