= Bibliography of works on James Bond =

A bibliography of reference material associated with the James Bond films, novels and genre.

== General reference books ==
- Adam, Ken; Frayling, Christopher (2008). Ken Adam Designs the Movies: James Bond and Beyond. London: Thames & Hudson. ISBN 978-0-500-51414-6.
- Amis, Kingsley (1965). The James Bond Dossier. London: Jonathan Cape.
- Barber, Hoyt L.; Barber, Harry L. (1999). Book of Bond, James Bond. London: Atlantic Books. ISBN 978-1-890723-20-0.
- Barnes, Alan; Hearn, Marcus (2003). Kiss Kiss Bang! Bang!: The Unofficial James Bond 007 Film Companion. Batsford. ISBN 978-0-7134-8645-2.
- Bouzereau, Laurent (2006). The Art of Bond: From storyboard to screen: the creative process behind the James Bond phenomenon. London: Boxtree. ISBN 978-0-7522-1551-8.
- Brosnan, John (1981). James Bond In The Cinema. Tantivy Press. ISBN 978-0-498-02546-4.
- Benson, Raymond (1988). The James Bond Bedside Companion. London: Boxtree Ltd. ISBN 978-1-85283-233-9.
- Black, Jeremy (2005). The Politics of James Bond: From Fleming's Novels to the Big Screen. U of Nebraska Press. ISBN 978-0-8032-6240-9.
- Bond, Mary Wickham (1980). To James Bond with Love. Sutter House. ISBN 978-0-915010-28-8.
- Burlingame, Jon (2012). The Music of James Bond. Oxford: Oxford University Press. ISBN 978-0-19-986330-3.
- Chancellor, Henry (2005). James Bond: The Man and His World. London: John Murray. ISBN 978-0-7195-6815-2.
- Chapman, James (2024) [1999]. Licence to Thrill: A Cultural History of the James Bond Films (3rd ed.). London: Bloomsbury Academic. ISBN 978-1-350-21109-4.
- Comentale, Edward P.; Watt, Stephen; Willman, Skip (2005). Ian Fleming & James Bond: The Cultural Politics of 007. Indiana University Press. ISBN 978-0-253-34523-3.
- Contosta, David R. (1993). The private life of James Bond. Sutter House. ISBN 978-0-915010-38-7.
- Cork, John; D'Abo, Maryam (2006). Bond Girls are Forever: The Woman of James Bond. Harry N. Abrams. ISBN 978-0-8109-8251-2.
- Cork, John; Scivally, Bruce (2002). James Bond: The Legacy. London: Boxtree. ISBN 978-0-7522-6498-1.
- Cork, John; Stutz, Collin (2007). James Bond Encyclopedia. London: Dorling Kindersley. ISBN 978-1-4053-3427-3.
- Desowitz, Bill (2012). James Bond Unmasked. Frederick: Spies Publishing. ISBN 978-0-9844126-1-7.
- Dougall, Alastair (2011). James Bond: The Secret World of 007. Dorling Kindersley. ISBN 978-1-4053-7086-8.
- Gardiner, Philip (2008). The Bond Code: The Dark World of Ian Fleming and James Bond. London: ReadHowYouWant.com. ISBN 978-1-4429-5538-7.
- Gassner, Dennis (2009). James Bond 50 Years of Movie Posters. London: Dorling Kindersley. ISBN 978-1-4053-5680-0.
- Gilbert, Jon (2012). Ian Fleming: The Bibliography. London: Queen Anne Press. ISBN 978-0-9558189-6-7.
- Gilbert, Jon (2020). The Schoyen Collection: Ian Fleming & James Bond. London: Adrian Harrington Limited. ISBN 978-0-9576041-1-7.
- Helfenstein, Charles (2009). The Making of On Her Majesty's Secret Service. Frederick: Spies Publishing. ISBN 978-0-9844126-0-0.
- Hibbin, Sally (1987). The official James Bond 007 movie book. Crown Publishers. ISBN 978-0-517-56643-5.
- Jütting, Kerstin (2007). "Grow up, 007!" – James Bond over the Decades: Formula vs. Innovation. GRIN Verlag. ISBN 978-3-638-85313-2.
- Lane, Andy; Simpson, Paul (2000). The Bond Files: The Unofficial Guide to the World's Greatest Secret Agent. London: Virgin Books. ISBN 978-0-7535-0490-1.
- Life Books (2012). Life: 50 Years of James Bond. Des Moines: Time Inc. ISBN 978-1-61893-031-6.
- Lindner, Christoph (2003). The James Bond Phenomenon: A Critical Reader. Manchester University Press. ISBN 978-0-7190-6541-5.
- Lipp, Deborah (2006). The Ultimate James Bond Fan Book. New York: Sterling & Ross Publishers. ISBN 978-0-9766372-8-8.
- Macintyre, Ben (2008). For Your Eyes Only. London: Bloomsbury Publishing. ISBN 978-0-7475-9527-4.
- McKay, Sinclair (2008). The Man With the Golden Touch: How the Bond Films Conquered the World. London: Aurum Press. ISBN 978-1-84513-355-9.
- Moore, Roger (2012). Bond on Bond. London: Michael O'Mara Books. ISBN 978-1-84317-861-3.
- Morrison, Grant (2011). Supergods. London: Random House. ISBN 978-0-224-08996-8.
- Nourmand, Tony (2004). James Bond Movie Posters: The Official 007 Collection. Chronicle Books. ISBN 978-0-8118-4465-9.
- O'Neill, Terry; Morgan, Robin (2012). All About Bond. London: Evans Mitchell Books. ISBN 978-1-901268-57-7.
- Packer, Jeremy (2009). Secret agents: popular icons beyond James Bond. Peter Lang. ISBN 978-0-8204-8669-7.
- Paterson, Michael (2012). Amazing & Extraordinary Facts James Bond. Newton Abbot: David & Charles. ISBN 978-1-4463-5613-5.
- Pfeiffer, Lee; Worrall, Dave (1998). The Essential Bond. London: Boxtree Ltd. ISBN 978-0-7522-2477-0.
- Rubin, Steven Jay (2003). The Complete James Bond Movie Encyclopedia. Contemporary Books. ISBN 978-0-07-141246-9.
- Rubin, Steven Jay (1981). The James Bond films: a behind the scenes history. Arlington House. ISBN 978-0-87000-523-7.
- Sellers, Robert (1997). The Battle for Bond. London: Tomahawk Press. ISBN 978-0-9557670-0-5.
- Simpson, Paul (2002). The Rough Guide to James Bond. Rough Guides. ISBN 978-1-84353-142-5.
- Smith, Jim; Lavington, Stephen (2002). Bond Films. London: Virgin Books. ISBN 978-0-7535-0709-4.
- South, James B.; Held, Jacob M. (2006). James Bond and Philosophy. Open Court Publishing. ISBN 978-0-8126-9607-3.
- Stevens, Dakota (2010). The Movie Franchises: James Bond Series Featuring Timothy Dalton in the Living Daylights. BiblioBazaar. ISBN 978-1-171-16029-8.
- West, Nigel (2010). Historical dictionary of Ian Fleming's world of intelligence: fact and fiction. Lanham, Maryland: Scarecrow Press. ISBN 978-0-7524-2896-3.

== Related biographies ==
=== Ian Fleming ===
- Cabell, Craig (2008). Ian Fleming's Secret War. Barnsley: Pen and Sword Books. ISBN 978-1-84415-773-0.
- Deighton, Len (2012). James Bond: My Long and Eventful Search for His Father (e-book). ASIN B00AQKE5S2.
- Gant, Richard (1966). Ian Fleming: Man with the Golden Pen. London: Mayflower-Dell. OCLC 487676374.
- Hart-Davis, Duff (1974). Peter Fleming: A Biography. London: Jonathan Cape. ISBN 0-224-01028-X.
- Longden, Sean (2010). T-Force: The Race for Nazi War Secrets, 1945. London: Constable & Robinson. ISBN 978-1-84901-297-3.
- Lycett, Andrew (2009). Ian Fleming. Orion Publishing. ISBN 978-1-85799-783-5.
- Macintyre, Ben (2010). Operation Mincemeat: The True Spy Story That Changed the Course of World War II. London: Bloomsbury Publishing. ISBN 978-1-4088-0921-1.
- Pearson, John (1967). The Life of Ian Fleming: Creator of James Bond. London: Pan Books.
- Rankin, Nicholas (2011). Ian Fleming's Commandos: The Story of 30 Assault Unit in WWII. London: Faber and Faber. ISBN 978-0-571-25062-2.
- Shakespeare, Nicholas (2023). Ian Fleming: The Complete Man. London: Harvill Secker. ISBN 978-1787302419.

=== James Bond ===
- Pearson, John (2008). James Bond: The Authorized Biography. Random House UK. ISBN 978-0-09-950292-0.

=== Albert R. Broccoli ===
- Broccoli, Albert R (1998). When the Snow Melts. London: Boxtree. ISBN 978-0-7522-1162-6.

=== Sean Connery ===
- Andrews, Emma (1982). The Films of Sean Connery. Confucian Press. ISBN 978-0-8253-0111-7.
- Bray, Christopher (2010). Sean Connery: The Measure of a Man. Faber & Faber, Limited. ISBN 978-0-571-26128-4.
- Callan, Michael Feeney (2011). Sean Connery. Virgin Books Limited. ISBN 978-0-7535-3910-1.
- Callan, Michael Feeney (2002). Sean Connery. London: Virgin Books. ISBN 978-1-85227-992-9.
- McCabe, Bob (2000). Sean Connery. Pavilion.
- Parker, John (1993). Sean Connery. Contemporary Books. ISBN 978-0-8092-3668-8.
- Parker, John (2009). Arise Sir Sean Connery: The Biography of Britain's Greatest Living Actor. John Blake. ISBN 978-1-84454-619-0.
- Passingham, Kenneth (1983). Sean Connery, a biography. Sidgwick & Jackson. ISBN 978-0-283-98921-6.
- Pfeiffer, Lee (2001). Films of Sean Connery - Update. Citadel Press. ISBN 978-0-8065-2223-4.
- Sellers, Robert (1999). Sean Connery: A Celebration. Robert Hale. ISBN 978-0-7090-6125-0.
- Silver, Alain (2009). Sean Connery. Taschen America LLC. ISBN 978-3-8365-0857-5.
- Yule, Andrew (August 1993). Sean Connery: From 007 to Hollywood Icon. Kensington Publishing Corporation. ISBN 978-1-55817-742-0.

=== David Niven ===
- Lord, Graham (2004). Niv: The Authorised Biography of David Niven. London: Orion Publishing Group. ISBN 978-0-7528-5928-6.
- Morley, Sheridan (1986). The Other Side of the Moon: The Life of David Niven. London: Hodder & Stoughton. ISBN 978-0-340-39643-8.
- Munn, Michael (2010). David Niven: The Man Behind the Balloon. London: JR Books. ISBN 978-1-906779-67-2.

=== George Lazenby ===
- Lazenby, George (2013). George Lazenby. Century. ISBN 978-1-84605-902-5.

=== Roger Moore ===
- Moore, Roger (1973). Roger Moore as James Bond: Roger Moore's Own Account of Filming Live and Let Die. Pan Books. ISBN 978-0-330-23653-9.
- Moore, Sir Roger (2008). My Word Is My Bond: A Memoir. London: Michael O'Mara Books. ISBN 978-0-06-167389-4.
- Owen, Gareth; Bayan, Oliver (2005). Roger Moore: His Films and Career. Robert Hale. ISBN 978-0-7090-7884-5.

=== Pierce Brosnan ===
- Carrick, Peter (2003). Pierce Brosnan. London: Robert Hale Books. ISBN 978-0-8065-2402-3.
- Membery, York (1997). Pierce Brosnan: The New Unauthorised Biography. London: Virgin Books. ISBN 978-0-7535-0158-0.

=== Daniel Craig ===
- Hurst, Brandon (2011). Daniel Craig, a James Bond of Our Times. London: Top Spot Publishing. ISBN 978-1-905382-85-9.
- Marshall, Sarah (2007). Daniel Craig: The Biography. London: John Blake Publishing. ISBN 978-1-84454-454-7.
- O'Brien, Daniel (2007). Daniel Craig – Ultimate Professional. London: Reynolds & Hearn Ltd. ISBN 978-1-905287-44-4.
- Ogle, Tina (2009). Daniel Craig: The Illustrated Biography. London: Carlton Publishing Group. ISBN 978-1-84732-266-1.

=== Cast ===
- Lee, Christopher (1997). Tall, dark and gruesome. Weidenfeld & Nicolson. ISBN 978-0-575-06497-3.
- Marshall, Sarah (2004). Diana Rigg: The Biography. Dallas: BenBella Books. ISBN 978-1-932100-27-3.
- Rigby, Jonathan (2007). Christopher Lee: The Authorised Screen History. London: Reynolds & Hearn. ISBN 978-1-905287-48-2.

=== Crew ===
- Adam, Ken; Frayling, Christopher (2008). Ken Adam Designs the Movies: James Bond and Beyond. London: Thames & Hudson. ISBN 978-0-500-51414-6.
- Armstrong, Vic; Sellers, Robert (2011). The True Adventures of the World's Greatest Stuntman. London: Titan Books. ISBN 978-1-84856-874-7.
- Frayling, Christopher (2005). Ken Adam: The Art of Production Design. London: Macmillan Publishers. ISBN 978-0-571-22057-1.
- Glen, John (2001). For My Eyes Only: My Life with James Bond. London: Batsford Books. ISBN 978-0-7134-8671-1.
- King, Emily; Fletcher, Alan (2005). Robert Brownjohn: Sex and Typography: 1925–1970 Life and Work. London: Laurence King. ISBN 978-1-85669-464-3.
- Wood, Christopher (2006). James Bond, The Spy I Loved. Twenty First Century Publishers Ltd. ISBN 978-1-904433-53-8.

== See also ==
- Bibliography of film by genre
- The Poor Man's James Bond
