= Antiquarian Booksellers' Association =

Senior trade body in Ireland and Great Britain

- Abbreviation: ABA
- Formation: 1906
- Type: Trade association
- Legal status: Non-profit company
- Purpose: Antiquarian booksellers in the UK
- Headquarters: London, WC2; United Kingdom
- Region served: Great Britain; Ireland
- Members: UK antiquarian booksellers
- Affiliations: International League of Antiquarian Booksellers
- Website: ABA

The Antiquarian Booksellers' Association (ABA) is the senior trade body in the Ireland and Great Britain for dealers in antiquarian and rare books, manuscripts and allied materials. The ABA organises a number of book fairs every year including its flagship fair held at Olympia, London in May, which features exhibitors from all around the world, and the Chelsea Antiquarian Book Fair in November. Fairs are held in Edinburgh in March and Bristol in July in conjunction with the Provincial Book Fairs Association. The ABA sponsors the London Rare Books School, the York Antiquarian Book Seminar, and a series of seminars at the University of London. The ABA Office is located on Bell Yard, off Fleet Street and next to the Royal Courts of Justice.

== History ==
It was founded in 1906 and is the oldest organisation of its kind in the world. Its membership also extends to many leading booksellers overseas. The ABA is run by a professional secretariat under the overall control of an elected President and Council.

Presidents originally served for one year, although the term increased to two years from the 1940s. The first President of the association was Henry N Stevens in 1907, who was followed by B. D. Maggs of London Booksellers Maggs Bros. Other notable past presidents include Robert Bowes of Bowes & Bowes (1914), Sir Basil Blackwell (1925-6), Frederic Sutherland Ferguson (1934), Percy Muir of Elkin Mathews (1946-7), Anthony Rota (1971-2), Hylton Bayntun-Coward (1980-2 and 1992-3) and Adrian Harrington (2001-3).

== ABA standards ==
Members are elected solely on the basis of proven experience, expertise and integrity. They are expected to observe the highest professional and ethical standards and to foster mutual trust between the trade and the public. Applicants for membership must have been full-time professional antiquarian booksellers for five consecutive years before becoming eligible. Applicants for Associate membership must have been full-time professional antiquarian booksellers for a minimum of two consecutive years before becoming eligible. Members are bound by the Articles of Association and Rules, as well as the most stringent Code of Good Practice yet adopted anywhere in the world of books.

The display of the ABA badge, which is a Registered Trade Mark, pledges members to:

- the authenticity of all material offered for sale
- the expert and proper description of all such material
- the disclosure of all significant defects or restorations
- the clear, accurate and professional pricing of all material
- the fairness and honesty of offers to purchase.

== Definition ==
Antiquarian booksellers are defined as individuals, sole traders, partnerships, companies, and corporations having antiquarian book departments, routinely and professionally engaged in purchasing, valuing, pricing and selling antiquarian books.

== Members with entries on Wikipedia ==
- George Bayntun
- Simon Beattie
- Robert Bowes
- Clive Farahar
- Rick Gekoski
- Sir David Attenborough (Honorary Member)
- Colin Franklin (writer and bibliographer)
- Jon Gilbert (bibliographer)
- Adrian Harrington
- Maggs Bros Ltd
- Neil Pearson
- Bernard Quaritch
- Robert Temple Booksellers
- Hyraxia Books

== See also ==
- List of booksellers associations
- Book trade in the United Kingdom
- Books in the United Kingdom
