= Robert Temple Booksellers =

Coordinates: 51.632°N 0.083°W

Robert Temple Booksellers is a British business that specialises in the sale of old and rare books by mail-order. Historically, they have been innovative in respect both of their business-model and in their use of emergent technologies. The bibliographical information given in all but their earliest catalogues appears to have been a major influence in determining the standard practices of many other bookselling firms in later times—in particular the provision of collations and the description of bindings.

== History of the business ==
Robert Temple Booksellers was founded in 1976 by Andrew Carpenter and Peter Allen, two friends who had met at York university. Initially it was purely a mail-order business, but early in 1977 they took over an existing bookshop in Kings Cross in central London, chiefly to have somewhere to store the stock apart from their own homes. Andrew Carpenter left the partnership in 1980, and in 1982 Peter Allen closed down the shop, and moved the business entirely to a house he rented in Islington, where it was to remain for the next thirty-two years.

The first Robert Temple Catalogue was issued in November 1976 and contained almost 1,200 items, mostly with the short entries common in those days. They adopted from the start a policy then unusual in the trade of billing all customers by pro-forma, and a note in their first Catalogue, reprinted in The Private Library made out the case for this with some cogency. With the advent of the web, it has now, of course, become standard practice. Because of the then oddity of the method, however, they gave from the start fuller descriptions of condition that most other catalogue booksellers did at that time, and more information about points and issues as well: the purchaser buying from them would not have seen the book before he paid.

== Technical developments ==
From the start Robert Temple Catalogues were set on a computer: originally on magnetic tape, but then, as this was difficult to edit when re-cataloguing unsold stock, they very soon went over instead to setting catalogues on the handier magnetic cards that were enjoying a brief vogue in about 1980–81. In 1982 they acquired their first PC from Premier Business Systems, a firm but recently founded by Charles Ross. This used a rudimentary program written in machine-code and designed for booksellers. The program incorporated a 'user-level' language, which was fairly basic, and in this Allen wrote a program capable of outputting catalogues in a style and format similar to those they had previously published. Up to this point all the catalogues had been produced as hard copy on a daisywheel printer, but Premier Business Systems morphed, first into Owl Microsystems, then, in December 1983, into 'The Clue Computing Company' (later to be bought by Bristol Office Machines), and they produced a system written in a higher-level language called CLUE, which was the brainchild of another bookseller, Mark Westwood. Allen produced his own system in this language (which is still in use by the firm to-day), and went over to producing hard-copy on a laser-printer. The original floppy discs were replaced in 1984 by Tandon Datapacs, and then, in 1990, after the advent of the cheap Winchester, by the conventional hard-discs we know to-day.

As space became less precious on recording media, it became possible to expand entries further, with the addition of full titles, collations, and more frequent extended notes, the value of which is reflected in the fact that the Robert Temple series of Catalogues are among the few that the British Library has selected for separate notice and added to their general catalogue as a resource. The catalogues, of which one hundred and eighteen were published in total, including six that were designated "New Series", are concerned almost wholly with literary first editions, antiquarian and modern, published in English, with the addition of a few continental books. As far as pre-1901 entries are concerned, the bibliographical information contained in them, supplemented with material that did not reach the catalogues or was only published later on the web, is now accessible on-line in the archive files on the Robert Temple website.

== Development of an Internet based business ==
In 1994, Gill Holman, who was based in Norwich, realising the potential of the newly available web, created a vortal site for booksellers, called ARCbooks, and in February 1996 Robert Temple began listing on it. At that point they did not have direct access to the web, and listings were made by sending floppy discs containing standard catalogue entries to ARCbooks, by post, which Gill herself converted into HTML format and displayed. Orders were placed with the firm, through her, by telephone. Very few booksellers were on the web then, and Robert Temple found their experiment so successful that they bought a computer capable of accessing the web, and began exchanging data files with Gill very much in the modern way. Gill had to give up her business in 1998, for personal reasons, just as it was taking off, but Bibliofind had started up by then, and Robert Temple began listing on that instead. Late in 1999 they issued their last printed catalogue, and since then have traded as a web-only bookseller. They are members of the Antiquarian Booksellers Association which they joined in 2006.

== Publications ==
Besides their bookselling activities, Robert Temple have followed the historical traditions of the trade by publishing books as well, albeit on a very small scale. Many of them are of the nature of press books. A select bibliography of their publications appears below.

1979 Allen (Osric). The Lady, the Curse, and the Statue: A fairy tale. With illustrations by Guy Carter. Printed on Barcham Green 'Langley' hand-made paper, 35 copies, numbered and signed by the author and the illustrator, 24pp.

1982 Hamilton (Robin). A Bardo of the Rock. Printed on Barcham Green 'Langley' hand-made paper, 50 copies, cloth, numbered and signed, 24pp. (There was also a trade edition on ordinary paper, in wrappers.)

1994 Allen (Osric). The Dark Tunnel: a Novel. Printed on large 'Caneletto Grossa' paper, 65 copies, quarter vellum, cloth sides, slip-case, signed by the author, 256pp. (There was also a 'Library Edition' printed on smaller archival cartridge paper and bound in cloth, and a trade hardcover edition, on ordinary paper, in boards.)

2010 Allen (Osric). Pornogram: a Novel (and a satire on the future of the Race). Printed on 'Muncken Premium Acid-free' paper, 33 copies, cloth, numbered and initialled by the author, 468pp. (There was also a hard-cover trade edition, 284 copies; and a paperback printing, published elsewhere.)

2010 Mackenzie (Henry). Poems written in Old Age. Printed on J. Whatman mould-made paper, 18 numbered copies, wrappers, 16pp.

2011 Reade (Charles). Letters to the Rev. John Gibson. Printed on J. Whatman mould-made paper, 18 numbered copies, wrappers, 40pp, facsimiles in text and one large folding.

2012 Ballantyne (R.M.). Notes for Speeches & a Letter. Printed on J. Whatman mould-made paper, 22 numbered copies, wrappers, 32pp., one facsimile in text.

2015 Allen (Osric). A Lost Novel by Jane Austen? Wrappers, 64pp.

== See also ==
- Book trade in the United Kingdom
- Books in the United Kingdom
