= First edition (disambiguation) =

A first edition is the first set of copies of a book printed from substantially the same setting of type.

(The) First Edition may also refer to:

== Music ==
- First Edition (Paper Lace album), 1972
- First Edition (George Shearing and Jim Hall album), 1981
- First Edition (Dei Hamo album), 2005
- The First Edition (band), a country music/rock band, later known as "Kenny Rogers and the First Edition"
  - The First Edition (album), 1967 debut album
- First Edition Records, a record label owned by the Louisville Orchestra

== Film and television ==
- First Edition (film), 1977 American short documentary film
- First Edition (Australian TV program), a long running Australian breakfast news program
- First Edition (Australian news TV program), 1993-96 Australian breakfast news program on the ABC
- First Edition (Irish TV programme), defunct news program on Irish television network TV3
- "The First Edition", an episode of The Waltons

== See also ==
- Second Edition (disambiguation)
