= Simon Beattie =

British antiquarian bookseller

Cover of Beattie’s Short List 2, published October 2010

Simon Beattie FSA (born 5 February 1975 in Aylesbury) is a British antiquarian bookseller, literary translator and music composer. He was the first British bookseller to be featured in the Fine Books Magazine series Bright Young Things; when he became a member of the Antiquarian Booksellers Association in 2011, the Association's newsletter described him as "a dealer to watch" (October 2011, Issue 364, p. 15).

Beattie was educated at Aylesbury Grammar School and the University of Exeter, where he took a double first in German and Russian (1997). He subsequently earned an MA in Lexicography (1998). Whilst at Exeter, Beattie also held a choral scholarship at Exeter Cathedral. After brief freelance dictionary work for Bloomsbury Publishing (Encarta® World English Dictionary, 1999) and Oxford University Press (The Oxford Russian Dictionary, third edition, 2000), Beattie joined the London antiquarian booksellers Bernard Quaritch Ltd in 1998.

In January 2010 he set up his own independent company in Chesham, Buckinghamshire, specialising in European cross-cultural history. His printed catalogues, entitled Short Lists, won the catalogue category in the 2010 McNaughton Review awards, a Gold Award at the 2011 Fresh Awards, two Gold Awards at the 2011 Roses Design Awards, Best Publication at the 2011 Cream Awards, and a Bronze Award at the Art Directors Club, New York, 2012. Short List 5 won In Book at the D&AD awards in 2013, and a Premier Award at the 2014 ISTD Awards.

On the publication of Beattie's first catalogue, The Book Collector wrote: 'If you have not got a copy of Beattie Short List 1, get it at once' (Autumn 2010, p. 462). Beattie was a 2012 winner in the Smarta 100 Awards for 'the most resourceful, original, exciting and disruptive small businesses in the UK'. He has taught at the York Antiquarian Book Seminar since its inception in 2014. It was Beattie who set in motion the worldwide strike by over 450 booksellers against AbeBooks' decision to withdraw from the Czech Republic, Hungary, Russia, and South Korea in November 2018.

Beattie's new translation of Gottfried Benn's shocking first poem Morgue was published in 2018. He has also translated Rainer Maria Rilke and Anna Akhmatova. His translation of the novel At the Edge of the Night by the German writer Friedo Lampe was published by Hesperus Press in 2019.

Beattie also composes choral music. His setting of Advent Calendar, a poem by Rowan Williams, was broadcast on BBC Radio 3 as part of the 2008 Advent carol service from St John's College, Cambridge. It has since been performed on both sides of the Atlantic. A more recent piece, The Angel and the Unicorn, setting a poem by Rilke (which Beattie himself translated) on the Annunciation, was premiered by the Choir of Selwyn College, Cambridge in 2020.

== See also ==
- Book trade in the United Kingdom
