= Hyraxia Books =

Hyraxia Books is a rare book firm specialising in modern literature. They are members of the PBFA and the (Antiquarian Bookseller Association) ABA. The firm was established in 2010 and had previously operated as a portal for book collectors.

Hyraxia Books were featured in Fine Book & Collections in 2013 as part of their Bright Young Things series. Hyraxia Books provided price guides for Haruki Murakami in the eighth edition of The Guide to First Edition Prices from the Tartarus Press, and consulted on the valuations for Salman Rushdie, Kazuo Ishiguro and Stephen King.

== See also ==
- Book trade in the United Kingdom
