= Bibliography of film by genre =

This is a bibliography of reference works on film by genre.

== Action / adventure ==
- Brode, Douglas (1 February 2003). Boys and Toys: Ultimate Action. Citadel Press. ISBN 978-0-8065-2381-1.
- Brown, Jeffrey A. (15 February 2011). Dangerous Curves: Action Heroines, Gender, Fetishism, and Popular Culture. Univ. Press of Mississippi. ISBN 978-1-60473-714-1.
- Donovan, Barna William (2008). The Asian influence on Hollywood action films. McFarland & Co. ISBN 978-0-7864-3403-9.
- —— (2010). Blood, guns, and testosterone: action films, audiences, and a thirst for violence. Scarecrow Press. ISBN 978-0-8108-7262-2.
- Gallagher, Mark (5 February 2006). Action Figures: Men, Action Films, and Contemporary Adventure Narratives. Macmillan. ISBN 978-1-4039-7012-1.
- Gimello-Mesplomb, Frédéric (2007). Le cinéma des années Reagan: Un modèle hollywoodien?. Nouveau Monde Editions. ISBN 978-2-84736-224-4.
- Hill, Katrina (8 November 2012). Action Movie Freak. Krause Publications Craft. ISBN 978-1-4402-3208-4.
- Holmlund, Chris (2002). Impossible Bodies: Femininity and Masculinity at the Movies. Routledge. ISBN 978-1-136-28443-4.
- Inness, Sherrie A. (1 February 2004). Action Chicks: New Images of Tough Women in Popular Culture. Palgrave Macmillan. ISBN 978-1-4039-6396-3.
- Julius, Marshall (1996). Action!: The Action Movie A-Z. Indiana University Press. ISBN 978-0-253-21091-3.
- Lichtenfeld, Eric (27 April 2007). Action Speaks Louder: Violence, Spectacle, and the American Action Movie. Wesleyan University Press. ISBN 978-0-8195-6801-4.
- Tasker, Yvonne (1993). Spectacular Bodies: Gender, Genre, and the Action Cinema. Psychology Press. ISBN 978-0-415-09223-4.
- —— (2004). Action and Adventure Cinema. Routledge. ISBN 978-0-415-23507-5.
- Taves, Brian (1993). The romance of adventure: the genre of historical adventure movies. University Press of Mississippi. ISBN 978-0-87805-597-5.

=== James Bond ===
Rubin, Steven Jay (2003). The Complete James Bond Movie Encyclopedia. Contemporary Books. ISBN 978-0-07-141246-9.

=== Martial arts ===
- Chen, Ya-chen (12 April 2012). Women in Chinese Martial Arts Films of the New Millennium: Narrative Analyses and Gender Politics. Lexington Books. ISBN 978-0-7391-3910-3.
- Hunt, Leon (2003). Kung Fu Cult Masters. Wallflower Press. ISBN 978-1-903364-63-5.
- Hunter, Jack, ed. (30 September 2005). Intercepting Fist: The Films of Bruce Lee and the Golden Age of Kung-Fu Cinema. Glitter Books. ISBN 978-1-902588-13-1.
- Lott, M. Ray (2004). The American Martial Arts Film. McFarland. ISBN 978-0-7864-1836-7.
- Meyers, Richard (1 April 2001). Great Martial Arts Movies. Citadel Press. ISBN 978-0-8065-2026-1.
- —— (1 April 2011). Films of Fury: The Kung Fu Movie Book. Eirini Press. ISBN 978-0-9799989-4-2.
- Palmer, Bill; Palmer, Karen; Meyers, Richard (1995). The encyclopedia of martial arts movies. Scarecrow Press. ISBN 978-0-8108-3027-1.
- Rance, Penelope (2005). Martial arts. Virgin Books. ISBN 978-0-7535-1078-0.
- Reid, Craig D. (1 November 2010). The Ultimate Guide to Martial Arts Movies of the 1970s: 500+ Films Loaded with Action, Weapons & Warriors. Black Belt Communications. ISBN 978-0-89750-192-7.
- Szeto, Kin-Yan (29 June 2011). The Martial Arts Cinema of the Chinese Diaspora: Ang Lee, John Woo, and Jackie Chan in Hollywood. SIU Press. ISBN 978-0-8093-3021-8.
- Teo, Stephen (2009). Chinese Martial Arts Cinema: The Wuxia Tradition. Edinburgh University Press. ISBN 978-0-7486-3286-2.
- West, David (26 December 2006). Chasing Dragons: An Introduction to the Martial Arts Film. I.B.Tauris. ISBN 978-1-85043-982-0.

=== War ===
- Davenport, Robert Ralsey (2004). The Encyclopedia of War Movies: The Authoritative Guide to Movies about Wars of the Twentieth Century. Facts On File/Checkmark Books. ISBN 978-0-8160-4479-5.
- Lentz, Robert J. (2003). Korean War Filmography: 91 English Language Features Through 2000. McFarland. ISBN 0786410469.
- Palmer, Bill; Palmer, Karen; Meyers, Richard (1995). The Encyclopedia of Martial Arts Movies. Scarecrow Press. ISBN 978-0-8108-3027-1.
- Picart, Caroline Joan (2004). The Holocaust Film Sourcebook. Praeger. ISBN 0275978508.
- Thomson, David (2023). The Fatal Alliance: A Century of War on Film. New York: Harper. ISBN 978-0-06-304141-7.

== Animated ==
- Beck, Jerry (28 October 2005). The Animated Movie Guide. Chicago Review Press. ISBN 978-1-55652-591-9.
- Bendazzi, Giannalberto (1994). Cartoons: One Hundred Years of Cinema Animation. Indiana University Press. ISBN 978-0-253-20937-5.
- Borowiec, Piotr (1998). Animated Short Films: A Critical Index to Theatrical Cartoons. Scarecrow Press. ISBN 978-0-8108-3503-0.
- Bukatman, Scott (26 March 2012). The Poetics of Slumberland: Animated Spirits and the Animating Spirit. University of California Press. ISBN 978-0-520-26571-4.
- Cohen, Karl F. (1 September 2004). Forbidden Animation: Censored Cartoons And Blacklisted Animators in America. McFarland. ISBN 978-0-7864-2032-2.
- Crafton, Donald (15 December 1993). Before Mickey: The Animated Film, 1898–1928. University of Chicago Press. ISBN 978-0-226-11667-9.
- Furniss, Maureen (1998). Art in Motion: Animation Aesthetics. Indiana University Press. ISBN 978-1-86462-039-9.
- King, C. Richard; Lugo-Lugo, Carmen R.; Bloodsworth-Lugo, Mary K. (16 February 2010). Animating Difference: Race, Gender, and Sexuality in Contemporary Films for Children. Rowman & Littlefield. ISBN 978-1-4422-0195-8.
- Lamarre, Thomas (30 October 2009). The Anime Machine: A Media Theory of Animation. University of Minnesota Press. ISBN 978-0-8166-5155-9.
- Murray, Robin L.; Heumann, Joseph K. (1 December 2011). That's All Folks?: Ecocritical Readings of American Animated Features. U of Nebraska Press. ISBN 978-0-8032-3512-0.
- Neupert, Richard (8 March 2011). History of Animated Cinema. John Wiley & Sons. ISBN 978-1-4443-9257-9.
- Pilling, Jayne (1997). A Reader In Animation Studies. Indiana University Press. ISBN 978-1-86462-000-9.
- Shull, Michael S.; Wilt, David E. (2004). Doing Their Bit: Wartime American Animated Short Films, 1939–1945. McFarland. ISBN 978-0-7864-1555-7.
- Telotte, J. P. (1 July 2010). Animating Space: From Mickey to WALL-E. University Press of Kentucky. ISBN 978-0-8131-3979-1.
- Webb, Graham (12 May 2011). The Animated Film Encyclopedia: A Complete Guide to American Shorts, Features and Sequences, 1900–1999. McFarland. ISBN 978-0-7864-4985-9.
- Wells, Paul (2002). Animation: Genre and Authorship. Wallflower Press. ISBN 978-1-903364-20-8.
- Wells, Paul; Hardstaff, Johnny; Clifton, Darryl (1 October 2008). Re-Imagining Animation: The Changing Face of the Moving Image. AVA Publishing. ISBN 978-2-940373-69-7.

== Art/Arthouse ==
- Arthur, Paul (15 January 2005). Line Of Sight: American Avant-Garde Film Since 1965. University of Minnesota Press. ISBN 978-0-8166-4265-6.
- Connolly, Maeve (7 January 2009). The Place of Artists' Cinema: Space, Site, and Screen. Intellect Books. ISBN 978-1-84150-246-5.
- Elder, R. Bruce (2008). Harmony and Dissent: Film and Avant-Garde Art Movements in the Early Twentieth Century. Wilfrid Laurier Univ. Press. ISBN 978-1-55458-028-6.
- Graf, Alexander; Scheunemann, Dietrich (2007). Avant-Garde Film. Rodopi. ISBN 978-90-420-2305-5.
- Hall, Phil (2004). The Encyclopedia of Underground Movies: Films from the Fringes of Cinema. M. Wiese Productions. ISBN 978-0-941188-95-1.
- Halle, Randall; Steingröver, Reinhild (2008). After the Avant-Garde: Contemporary German and Austrian Experimental Film. Camden House. ISBN 978-1-57113-365-6.
- Hamlyn, Nicky (1 November 2003). Film art phenomena. BFI Publishing. ISBN 978-0-85170-971-0.
- O'Pray, Michael (29 May 2012). Avant-Garde Film: Forms, Themes, and Passions. Columbia University Press. ISBN 978-0-231-85000-1.
- Rieser, Martin; Zapp, Andrea (17 April 2002). New screen media: cinema/art/narrative. BFI Publishing. ISBN 978-0-85170-865-2.
- Skoller, Jeffrey (14 August 2005). Shadows, Specters, Shards: Making History in Avant-Garde Film. U of Minnesota Press. ISBN 978-0-8166-4232-8.
- Wilinsky, Barbara (9 January 2001). Sure Seaters: The Emergence of Art House Cinema. U of Minnesota Press. ISBN 978-0-8166-3563-4.

== Biographical ==
- Bingham, Dennis (2 April 2010). Whose Lives Are They Anyway?: The Biopic as Contemporary Film Genre. Rutgers University Press. ISBN 978-0-8135-4658-2.
- Custen, George (1 May 1992). Bio/Pics: How Hollywood Constructed Public History. Rutgers University Press. ISBN 978-0-8135-1755-1.

== Blaxploitation ==
- Dunn, Stephane (4 August 2008). "Baad Bitches" and Sassy Supermamas: Black Power Action Films. University of Illinois Press. ISBN 978-0-252-07548-3.
- Howard, Josiah (30 June 2008). Blaxploitation Cinema: The Essential Reference Guide. Fab Press. ISBN 978-1-903254-44-8.
- Sims, Yvonne D. (24 August 2006). Women of Blaxploitation: How the Black Action Film Heroine Changed American Popular Culture. McFarland. ISBN 978-0-7864-2744-4.
- Walker, David; Rausch, Andrew J.; Watson, Chris (30 March 2009). Reflections on Blaxploitation: Actors and Directors Speak. Scarecrow Press. ISBN 978-0-8108-6706-2.

== Comedy ==
- Austerlitz, Saul (1 September 2010). Another Fine Mess: A History of American Film Comedy. Chicago Review Press. ISBN 978-1-55652-951-1.
- Horton, Andrew; Rapf, Joanna E., eds. (7 September 2012). A Companion to Film Comedy. John Wiley & Sons. ISBN 978-1-118-32784-5.
- Karnick, Kristine Brunovska (1995). Classical Hollywood Comedy. Psychology Press. ISBN 978-0-415-90640-1.
- King, Geoff (2002). Film Comedy. Wallflower Press. ISBN 978-1-903364-35-2.
- Laham, Nicholas (30 June 2009). Currents of Comedy on the American Screen: How Film and Television Deliver Different Laughs for Changing Times. McFarland. ISBN 978-0-7864-4264-5.
- Matthews, Nicole (2000). Comic Politics: Gender in Hollywood Comedy After the New Right. Manchester University Press. ISBN 978-0-7190-5503-4.
- Sutton, David (1 January 2000). A Chorus Of Raspberries: British Film Comedy 1929–1939. University of Exeter Press. ISBN 978-0-85989-603-0.
- Tueth, Michael V. (3 May 2012). Reeling with Laughter: American Film Comedies—From Anarchy to Mockumentary. Scarecrow Press. ISBN 978-0-8108-8367-3.

== Crime ==
- British Film Institute (1997). The BFI Companion to Crime. Continuum International Publishing Group. ISBN 978-0-304-33215-1.
- Brode, Douglas (1995). Money, women, and guns: Crime movies from Bonnie and Clyde to the present. Carol Pub. Group. ISBN 978-0-8065-1608-0.
- Chibnail, Steve (28 June 1999). British Crime Cinema. Psychology Press. ISBN 978-0-415-16870-0.
- Delamater, Jerome; Prigozy, Ruth, eds. (1998). The Detective in American Fiction, Film, and Television. Greenwood Publishing Group. ISBN 978-0-313-30463-7.
- Forshaw, Barry (30 October 2012). British Crime Film: Subverting the Social Order. Palgrave Macmillan. ISBN 978-0-230-30370-6.
- Gates, Philippa (2006). Detecting Men: Masculinity And the Hollywood Detective Film. SUNY Press. ISBN 978-0-7914-6813-5.
- Gillis, Stacy; Gates, Philippa, eds. (2002). The Devil himself: villainy in detective fiction and film. Greenwood Press. ISBN 978-0-313-31655-5.
- Glassman, Steve; O'Sullivan, Maurice, eds. (1997). Crime Fiction and Film in the Sunshine State: Florida Noir. Bowling Green State University Popular Press. ISBN 978-0-87972-749-9.
- ——; ——, eds. (2001). Crime Fiction and Film in the Southwest: Bad Boys and Bad Girls in the Badlands. Popular Press. ISBN 978-0-87972-846-5.
- Hughes, Howard (22 August 2006). Crime Wave: The Filmgoers' Guide to the Great Crime Movies. I. B. Tauris. ISBN 978-1-84511-219-6.
- Langman, Larry; Finn, Daniel (1994). A guide to American silent crime films. Greenwood Press. ISBN 978-0-313-28858-6.
- —— (1995). A guide to American crime films of the thirties. Greenwood Press. ISBN 978-0-313-29532-4.
- —— (1995). A guide to American crime films of the forties and fifties. Greenwood Press. ISBN 978-0-313-29265-1.
- Leitch, Thomas (15 August 2002). Crime Films. Cambridge University Press. ISBN 978-0-521-64671-0.
- Mayer, Geoff (16 September 2012). Historical Dictionary of Crime Films. Scarecrow Press. ISBN 978-0-8108-6769-7.
- Nestingen, Andrew K. (30 July 2008). Crime and Fantasy in Scandinavia: Fiction, Film, and Social Change. University of Washington Press. ISBN 978-0-295-98804-7.
- Parish, James Robert (1 October 1990). The great cop pictures. Scarecrow Press. ISBN 978-0-8108-2316-7.
- Rafter, Nicole (20 April 2006). Shots in the Mirror: Crime Films and Society. Oxford University Press. ISBN 978-0-19-517506-6.
- Scaglia, Beatriz (April 2011). The Thrill of the Kill: Celebrating the Crime Film Genre. Webster's Digital Services. ISBN 978-1-241-59183-0.
- Sorrento, Matthew (30 July 2012). The New American Crime Film. MCFARLAND & Company Incorporated. ISBN 978-0-7864-5920-9.

=== Film noir ===
- Mayer, Geoff; McDonnell, Brian (2007). Encyclopedia of Film Noir. ABC-CLIO. ISBN 978-0-313-33306-4.
- Spicer, Andrew (30 March 2010). Historical Dictionary of Film Noir. Scarecrow Press. ISBN 978-0-8108-5960-9.

=== Gangster film ===
- Grieveson, Lee; Sonnet, Esther; Stanfield, Peter, eds. (28 April 2005). Mob Culture: Hidden Histories of the American Gangster Film. Rutgers University Press. ISBN 978-0-8135-3557-9.
- Hardy, Phil (1998). The Aurum Film Encyclopedia, Volume 4: The Gangster Film. UK: Aurum Press.
- Larke-Walsh, George S. (6 March 2010). Screening the Mafia: Masculinity, Ethnicity and Mobsters from The Godfather to The Sopranos. McFarland. ISBN 978-0-7864-4311-6.
- Mason, Fran (8 February 2003). American Gangster Cinema: From 'Little Caesar' to 'Pulp Fiction'. Palgrave Macmillan. ISBN 978-0-333-68466-5.
- McCarty, John (1993). Hollywood Gangland: The Movies' Love Affair With the Mob. St. Martin's Press. ISBN 978-0-312-09306-8.
- —— (2005). Bullets Over Hollywood: The American Gangster Picture from the Silents to "The Sopranos". Da Capo Press. ISBN 978-0-306-81429-7.
- Munby, Jonathan (15 March 1999). Public Enemies, Public Heroes: Screening the Gangster from Little Caesar to Touch of Evil. University of Chicago Press. ISBN 978-0-226-55031-2.
- Nochimson, Martha P. (29 May 2007). Dying to Belong: Gangster Movies in Hollywood and Hong Kong. John Wiley & Sons. ISBN 978-1-4051-6370-5.
- Shadoian, Jack (16 January 2003). Dreams and Dead Ends: The American Gangster Film (2 ed.). Oxford University Press. ISBN 978-0-19-514292-1.
- Silver, Alain; Ursini, James, eds. (1 February 2007). The Gangster Film Reader. Hal Leonard Corporation. ISBN 978-0-87910-332-3.
- Smith, Jim (15 June 2011). Gangster Films. Virgin Books Limited. ISBN 978-0-7535-3929-3.
- Stephens, Michael L. (8 February 2008). Gangster Films: A Comprehensive, Illustrated Reference to People, Films and Terms. MCFARLAND & Company Incorporated. ISBN 978-0-7864-3770-2.
- Yaquinto, Marilyn (1998). Pump 'em full of lead: a look at gangsters on film. Twayne. ISBN 978-0-8057-3892-6.

== Horror / thriller ==
=== Horror ===
- Hanich, Julian (2010). Cinematic Emotion in Horror Films and Thrillers: The Aesthetic Paradox of Pleasurable Fear. Routledge Advances in Film Studies. Routledge. ISBN 978-0-415-87139-6.
- Hardy, Phil (1984). The Aurum Film Encyclopedia, Volume 3: Horror. UK: Aurum Press.
- Milne, Tom; Hardy, Phil (1986). The Encyclopedia of Horror Movies. Harper & Row. ISBN 978-0-06-055050-9.
- Myford, Eric (2010). The Encyclopedia of Horror & Suspense Movies Volume I. CreateSpace. ISBN 978-1-4538-2100-8.

=== Thriller ===
- Derry, Charles (2001). The Suspense Thriller: Films in the Shadow of Alfred Hitchcock. McFarland & Company. ISBN 978-0-7864-1208-2.
- Frank, Alan (1997). Frank's 500: The Thriller Film Guide. Batsford. ISBN 978-0-7134-2728-8.
- Hanich, Julian (2010). Cinematic Emotion in Horror Films and Thrillers: The Aesthetic Paradox of Pleasurable Fear. Routledge Advances in Film Studies. Routledge. ISBN 978-0-415-87139-6.
- Hicks, Neil D. (2002). Writing the Thriller Film: The Terror Within. Michael Wiese Productions. ISBN 978-0-941188-46-3.
- Indick, William (2006). Psycho Thrillers: Cinematic Explorations of the Mysteries of the Mind. McFarland & Company. ISBN 978-0-7864-2371-2.
- Mesce, Bill (2007). Overkill: The Rise And Fall of Thriller Cinema. McFarland & Company. ISBN 978-0-7864-2751-2.
- Rubin, Martin (1999). Thrillers. Genres in American Cinema. Cambridge University Press. ISBN 978-0-521-58839-3.

== Musical ==
- Altman, Rick (1989). The American Film Musical. Indiana University Press. ISBN 0-253-20514-X.
- Barrios, Richard (1995). A Song in the Dark: The Birth of the Musical Film. Oxford University Press. ISBN 978-0-19-508811-3.
- Creekmur, Corey; Mokdad, Linda (1 January 2012). The International Film Musical. Oxford University Press. ISBN 978-0-7486-5430-7.
- Dunne, Michael (25 August 2004). American Film Musical Themes and Forms. McFarland. ISBN 978-0-7864-8337-2.
- Grant, Barry Keith (23 April 2012). The Hollywood Film Musical. John Wiley & Sons. ISBN 978-1-4051-8253-9.
- Green, Stanley (1981). Encyclopedia of the Musical Film. Oxford University Press.
- Hirschhorn, Clive. (1981). Hollywood Musical. Crown.
- Hischak, Thomas S. (2008). The Oxford Companion to the American Musical: Theatre, Film, and Television. Oxford University Press. ISBN 978-0-19-533533-0.

== Road movie ==
- Cohan, Steven; Hark, Ina Rae, eds. (1997). The Road Movie Book. Routledge. ISBN 978-0-415-14937-2.
- Laderman, David (2002). Driving Visions: Exploring the Road Movie. University of Texas Press. ISBN 978-0-292-74732-6.
- Mazierska, Ewa; Rascaroli, Laura (2006). Crossing New Europe: Postmodern Travel and the European Road Movie. Wallflower Press. ISBN 978-1-904764-67-0.
- Mills, Katie (2006). The Road Story and the Rebel: Moving Through Film, Fiction, and Television. Southern Illinois University Press. ISBN 978-0-8093-2710-2.
- Orgeron, Devin (2007). Road Movies: From Muybridge and Méliès to Lynch and Kiarostami. Palgrave Macmillan. ISBN 978-0-230-60127-7.
- Wood, Jason (2008). 100 Road Movies. BFI Screen Guides. British Film Institute. ISBN 978-1-84457-160-4.

== Samurai ==
- Galloway, Patrick (2009). Warring Clans, Flashing Blades: A Samurai Film Companion. Stone Bridge Press. ISBN 978-1-933330-78-5.
- Silver, Alain (2005). The Samurai Film. Duckworth Publishers. ISBN 978-0-7156-3662-6.
- Thorne, Roland (20 August 2013). Samurai Films. Oldcastle Books, Limited. ISBN 978-1-84243-400-0.
- Thornton, S.A. (30 October 2007). The Japanese Period Film: A Critical Analysis. McFarland & Company. ISBN 978-0-7864-3136-6.

== Science fiction ==
- Cornea, Christine (2007). Science Fiction Cinema: Between Fantasy and Reality. Edinburgh University Press. ISBN 978-0-7486-1642-8.
- Hardy, Phil (1984). The Aurum Film Encyclopedia, Volume 2: Science Fiction. UK: Aurum Press. ISBN 978-0-7064-2557-4. Google Books.
- Henderson, C. J. (2001). The Encyclopedia of Science Fiction Movies. Facts On File. ISBN 978-0-8160-4567-9.
- Kuhn, Annette (1990). Alien Zone: Cultural Theory and Contemporary Science Fiction Cinema. Verso. ISBN 978-0-86091-993-3.
- —— (1999). Alien Zone II: The Spaces of Science-fiction Cinema. Verso. ISBN 978-1-85984-259-1.
- Sobchack, Vivian Carol (1987). Screening Space: The American Science Fiction Film. Rutgers University Press. ISBN 978-0-8135-2492-4.
- Telotte, J. P. (24 September 2001). Science Fiction Film. Cambridge University Press. ISBN 978-0-521-59647-3.

== Western ==
- Buscombe, Edward (1993). The BFI Companion to the Western. Andre Deutsch. ISBN 978-0-233-98857-3.
- Cameron, Ian Alexander (1996). The book of westerns. Continuum. ISBN 978-0-8264-0818-1.
- Carmichael, Deborah A. (2006). The Landscape of Hollywood Westerns: Ecocriticism in an American Film Genre. University of Utah Press. ISBN 978-0-87480-866-7.
- Cawelti, John G. (1 January 1999). The Six-gun Mystique Sequel. Popular Press. ISBN 978-0-87972-785-7.
- Hardy, Phil (1983). The Aurum Film Encyclopedia, Volume 1: The Western. UK: Aurum Press. ISBN 978-0-7064-2555-0. Google Books.
- Kitses, Jim (1 September 2007). Horizons West: The Western from John Ford to Clint Eastwood. British Film Institute. ISBN 978-1-84457-019-5.
- Kitses, Jim; Rickman, Gregg (1 September 1998). The western reader. Limelight Editions. ISBN 978-0-87910-268-5.
- McMahon, Jennifer L.; Csaki, B. Steve (2010). The Philosophy of the Western. University Press of Kentucky. ISBN 978-0-8131-2591-6.
- Saunders, John (2001). The Western Genre: From Lordsburg to Big Whiskey. Wallflower Press. ISBN 978-1-903364-12-3.
- Simmon, Scott (30 June 2003). The Invention of the Western Film: A Cultural History of the Genre's First Half Century. Cambridge University Press. ISBN 978-0-521-55581-4.
- Wright, Will (1977). Six Guns and Society: A Structural Study of the Western. University of California Press. ISBN 978-0-520-03491-4.

== Other genres ==
- Drama: Cody, Gabrielle H.; Sprinchorn, Evert, eds. (2007). The Columbia Encyclopedia of Modern Drama. Columbia University Press. ISBN 9780231140324.
- Pornography/erotic film: Williams, Linda (1989). Hard Core: Power, Pleasure, and the "frenzy of the Visible". University of California Press. ISBN 978-0-520-06652-6.
- Religion: Eaghill, Tenzan; King, Rebekka, eds. (2022). Representing Religion in Film. London: Bloomsbury Academic. ISBN 978-1-350-14080-6.
- Sport film: Edgington, K.; Erskine, Thomas L.; Welsh, James (2010). Encyclopedia of Sports Films. Scarecrow Press. ISBN 978-0-8108-7652-1.

== See also ==
- Bibliography of encyclopedias: film and television
- List of books on films
- Bibliography of film: film noir
- Bibliography of film: documentary
- Bibliography of film: horror
- Bibliography of works on James Bond
