= Bibliography of film: documentary =

This is a list of reference works on documentary films.

== Books ==
- Aitken, Ian (24 September 1992). Film and Reform: John Grierson and the Documentary Film Movement. Taylor & Francis. ISBN 978-0-415-08121-4.
- Aitken, Ian, ed. (1998). The Documentary Film Movement: An Anthology. Edinburgh University Press. ISBN 978-0-7486-0948-2.
- Aitken, Ian, ed. (16 November 2012). The Concise Routledge Encyclopedia of the Documentary Film. Taylor & Francis. ISBN 978-0-415-59642-8.
- Alexander, William (1981). Film on the Left: American Documentary Film from 1931 to 1942. Princeton University Press. ISBN 978-0-691-10111-8.
- Alter, Nora M. (14 August 2002). Projecting History: German Nonfiction Cinema, 1967-2000. University of Michigan Press. ISBN 978-0-472-06812-8.
- Aufderheide, Patricia (27 October 2007). Documentary Film: A Very Short Introduction. Oxford University Press. ISBN 978-0-19-983998-8.
- Baker, Maxine (2006). Documentary in the Digital Age. Taylor & Francis US. ISBN 978-0-240-51688-2.
- Barnouw, Erik (7 January 1993). Documentary: A History of the Non-Fiction Film (2 ed.). Oxford University Press. ISBN 978-0-19-507898-5.
- Barsam, Richard Meran (1992). Nonfiction Film: A Critical History. Indiana University Press. ISBN 978-0-253-20706-7.
- Barson, Tanya; Morris, Lynda; Nash, Mark (2006). Making history: art and documentary in Britain from 1929 to now. Tate Publishing. ISBN 978-1-85437-682-4.
- Beattie, Keith (4 September 2004). Documentary Screens: Non-Fiction Film and Television. Palgrave Macmillan. ISBN 978-0-333-74117-7.
- Benson, Thomas W.; Snee, Brian J., eds. (23 May 2008). The Rhetoric of the New Political Documentary. SIU Press. ISBN 978-0-8093-2836-9.
- Berry, Chris; Lu, Xinyu; Rofel, Lisa, eds. (1 December 2010). The New Chinese Documentary Film Movement: For the Public Record. Hong Kong University Press. ISBN 978-988-8028-51-1.
- Bloom, Peter J. (12 March 2008). French Colonial Documentary: Mythologies of Humanitarianism. U of Minnesota Press. ISBN 978-0-8166-4628-9.
- Boon, Timothy (2008). Films of Fact: A History of Science in Documentary Films and Television. Wallflower. ISBN 978-1-905674-37-4.
- Bruzzi, Stella (2000). New Documentary: A Critical Introduction. Psychology Press. ISBN 978-0-415-18296-6.
- Bryant, Marsha (1997). Auden and Documentary in the 1930s. University Press of Virginia. ISBN 978-0-8139-1756-6.
- Bullert, B.J. (1 December 1997). Public Television: Politics and the Battle over Documentary Film. Rutgers University Press. ISBN 978-0-8135-2470-2.
- Burton, Julianne (15 September 1990). The Social Documentary in Latin America. University of Pittsburgh Pre. ISBN 978-0-8229-5419-4.
- Chapman, Jane L. (15 September 2009). Issues in Contemporary Documentary. Polity. ISBN 978-0-7456-4009-9.
- Chris, Cynthia (14 March 2006). Watching Wildlife. U of Minnesota Press. ISBN 978-0-8166-4547-3.
- Chu, Yingchi (3 August 2007). Chinese Documentaries: From Dogma to Polyphony. Psychology Press. ISBN 978-0-415-37570-2.
- Cooper, Sarah (2006). Selfless Cinema?: Ethics And French Documentary. Legenda. ISBN 978-1-904713-12-8.
- Corner, John (15 November 1996). The Art of Record: A Critical Introduction to Documentary. Manchester University Press. ISBN 978-0-7190-4687-2.
- Cousins, Mark; MacDonald, Kevin, eds. (2006). Imagining Reality: The Faber Book of Documentary. Faber & Faber. ISBN 978-0-571-22514-9.
- Cowie, Elizabeth (2 March 2011). Recording Reality, Desiring the Real. University of Minnesota Press. ISBN 978-0-8166-4549-7.
- Culbert, David (1990). Film and Propaganda in America: A Documentary History. Greenwood Publishing Group.
- Cunningham, Megan (1 July 2005). The Art Of The Documentary: Ten Conversations With Leading Directors, Cinematographers, Editors, And Producers. New Riders. ISBN 978-0-321-31623-3.
- Dibbets, Karel; Hogenkamp, Bert, eds. (1995). Film and the First World War. Amsterdam University Press. ISBN 978-90-5356-064-8.
- Druick, Zoë (22 February 2007). Projecting Canada: Government Policy and Documentary Film at the National Film Board. McGill-Queen's Press - MQUP. ISBN 978-0-7735-3185-7.
- Ellis, Jack C. (1 January 1989). The documentary idea: a critical history of English-language documentary film and video. Prentice Hall. ISBN 978-0-13-217142-7.
- Gaines, Jane M.; Renov, Michael, eds. (1 July 1999). Collecting Visible Evidence. U of Minnesota Press. ISBN 978-0-8166-3136-0.
- Girgus, Sam B. (17 October 2002). America on Film: Modernism, Documentary, and a Changing America. Cambridge University Press. ISBN 978-0-521-00931-7.
- Goldsmith, David (3 August 2003). Documentary Makers: Interviews with 15 of the Best in the Business. Rotovision. ISBN 978-2-88046-730-2.
- Grant, Barry Keith; Sloniowski, Jeannette, eds. (1998). Documenting the Documentary: Close Readings of Documentary Film and Video. Wayne State University Press. ISBN 978-0-8143-2639-8.
- Grierson, John (1979). Hardy, Forsyth (ed.). Grierson on Documentary. Faber & Faber. ISBN 978-0-571-11367-5.
- Griffiths, Alison (2002). Wondrous Difference: Cinema, Anthropology & Turn-of-the-century Visual Culture. Columbia University Press. ISBN 978-0-231-11697-8.
- Guynn, William (1990). A Cinema of Nonfiction. Fairleigh Dickinson University Press. ISBN 978-0-8386-3340-3.
- Haddu, Miriam; Page, Joanna, eds. (15 May 2009). Visual Synergies in Fiction and Documentary Film from Latin America. Macmillan. ISBN 978-0-230-60638-8.
- Heider, Karl G. (1 November 2006). Ethnographic Film (2 ed.). University of Texas Press. ISBN 978-0-292-71458-8.
- Heider, Karl G.; Blakely, Pamela Ann Reese; Blakely, Thomas Dustin (2007). Seeing Anthropology: Cultural Anthropology Through Film (4 ed.). Pearson/Allyn and Bacon. ISBN 978-0-205-48355-6.
- Heyman, Neil M. (1996). Western civilization: a critical guide to documentary films. Greenwood Press. ISBN 978-0-313-28438-0.
- Hicks, Jeremy (15 March 2007). Dziga Vertov: Defining Documentary Film. I.B.Tauris. ISBN 978-1-84511-377-3.
- Hogarth, David (1 May 2006). Realer Than Reel: Global Directions in Documentary. University of Texas Press. ISBN 978-0-292-71260-7.
- Holmlund, Chris; Fuchs, Cynthia, eds. (1997). Between the Sheets, in the Streets: Queer, Lesbian, and Gay Documentary. U of Minnesota Press. ISBN 978-0-8166-2774-5.
- Isenberg, Michael T. (1 October 1981). War on film: the American cinema and World War I, 1914-1941. Fairleigh Dickinson University Press. ISBN 978-0-8386-2004-5.
- Ishizuka, Karen L.; Zimmermann, Patricia R., eds. (5 December 2007). Mining the Home Movie: Excavations in Histories and Memories. University of California Press. ISBN 978-0-520-23087-3.
- Izod, John; Kilborn, Richard; Hibberd, Matthew, eds. (1 January 2000). From Grierson to the Docu-soap: Breaking the Boundaries. Indiana University Press. ISBN 978-1-86020-577-4.
- Jacobs, Lewis, ed. (1 November 1979). The Documentary Tradition (2 ed.). W. W. Norton. ISBN 978-0-393-01298-9.
- Jerslev, Anne, ed. (2002). Realism and 'reality' in Film and Media. Museum Tusculanum Press. ISBN 978-87-7289-716-5.
- Kahana, Jonathan (15 June 2008). Intelligence Work: The Politics of American Documentary. Columbia University Press. ISBN 978-0-231-14207-6.
- Klotman, Phyllis R.; Cutler, Janet K., eds. (1999). Struggles for Representation: African American Documentary Film and Video. Indiana University Press. ISBN 978-0-253-21347-1.
- Lane, Jim (26 March 2002). The Autobiographical Documentary in America. Univ of Wisconsin Press. ISBN 978-0-299-17654-9.
- Lay, Samantha (2002). British Social Realism: From Documentary to Brit-Grit. Wallflower Press. ISBN 978-1-903364-41-3.
- Leach, Jim; Sloniowski, Jeannette, eds. (2003). Candid Eyes: Essays on Canadian Documentaries. University of Toronto Press. ISBN 978-0-8020-8299-2.
- Leuthold, Steven (1998). Indigenous Aesthetics: Native Art, Media, and Identity. University of Texas Press. ISBN 978-0-292-74703-6.
- Levine, Alison J. Murray (18 February 2010). Framing the Nation: Documentary Film in Interwar France. Continuum International Publishing Group. ISBN 978-0-8264-3187-5.
- Logan, Philip C. (1 May 2011). Humphrey Jennings and British Documentary Film Movement: A Re-Assessment. Ashgate Publishing, Ltd. ISBN 978-0-7546-6726-1.
- Loizos, Peter (1993). Innovation in Ethnographic Film: From Innocence to Self-Consciousness, 1955-85. Manchester University Press ND. ISBN 978-0-7190-3910-2.
- MacCann, Richard Dyer (1973). The people's films: a political history of U.S. Government motion pictures. Hastings House. ISBN 978-0-8038-5795-7.
- McEnteer, James (2006). Shooting the Truth: The Rise of American Political Documentaries. Greenwood Publishing Group. ISBN 978-0-275-98760-2.
- McLane, Betsy A. (26 April 2012). A New History of Documentary Film: Second Edition. Bloomsbury. ISBN 978-1-4411-2457-9.
- Mitman, Gregg (15 June 2009). Reel Nature: America's Romance With Wildlife on Film (2 ed.). University of Washington Press. ISBN 978-0-295-98886-3.
- Nichols, Bill (1991). Representing Reality: Issues and Concepts in Documentary. Indiana University Press. ISBN 978-0-253-20681-7.
- Nichols, Bill (1994). Blurred Boundaries: Questions of Meaning in Contemporary Culture. Indiana University Press. ISBN 978-0-253-20900-9.
- Nichols, Bill (7 December 2010). Introduction to Documentary (2 ed.). Indiana University Press. ISBN 978-0-253-35556-0.
- Nornes, Abé Mark (8 July 2003). Japanese Documentary Film: The Meiji Era Through Hiroshima. University of Minnesota Press. ISBN 978-0-8166-4046-1.
- Nornes, Abé Mark (15 February 2007). Forest of Pressure: Ogawa Shinsuke and Postwar Japanese Documentary. U of Minnesota Press. ISBN 978-0-8166-4908-2.
- Nornes, Abé Mark; Fukushima, Yukio, eds. (1 December 1994). Japan/America Film Wars: WWII Propaganda and Its Cultural Contexts. Taylor & Francis US. ISBN 978-3-7186-0562-0.
- O'Brien, Harvey (1 March 2005). The Real Ireland: The Evolution of Ireland in Documentary Film. Manchester University Press. ISBN 978-0-7190-6907-9.
- Pallister, Janis L.; Hottell, Ruth A. (2005). French-Speaking Women Documentarians: A Guide. Peter Lang. ISBN 978-0-8204-7614-8.
- Papazian, Elizabeth Astrid (12 September 2008). Manufacturing Truth: The Documentary Moment in Early Soviet Culture. Northern Illinois University Press. ISBN 978-0-87580-389-0.
- Pearce, Gail; McLaughlin, Cahal, eds. (15 February 2008). Truth or Dare: Art and Documentary. Intellect Books. ISBN 978-1-84150-175-8.
- Picart, Caroline Joan (2004). The Holocaust Film Sourcebook: Documentary and propaganda. Praeger. ISBN 978-0-275-98328-4.
- Platinga, Carl R. (January 2010). Rhetoric and Representation in Nonfiction Film. Chapbook Press. ISBN 978-1-936243-01-3.
- Ponech, Trevor (1999). What is non-fiction cinema?: on the very idea of motion picture communication. Westview Press. ISBN 978-0-8133-6703-3.
- Pullen, Christopher (January 2007). Documenting gay men: identity and performance in reality television and documentary film. McFarland. ISBN 978-0-7864-2807-6.
- Rabinowitz, Paula (1994). They Must Be Represented: The Politics of Documentary. Verso. ISBN 978-1-85984-025-2.
- Renov, Michael, ed. (10 May 1993). Theorizing Documentary. Psychology Press. ISBN 978-0-415-90382-0.
- Renov, Michael (16 June 2004). Subject Of Documentary. U of Minnesota Press. ISBN 978-0-8166-3441-5.
- Rhodes, Gary Don; Springer, John Parris, eds. (2006). Docufictions: essays on the intersection of documentary and fictional filmmaking. McFarland & Co. ISBN 978-0-7864-2184-8.
- Roberts, Graham (15 April 1999). Forward Soviet!: History and Non-Fiction Film in the USSR. I.B.Tauris. ISBN 978-1-86064-282-1.
- Rony, Fatimah Tobing (17 September 1996). The Third Eye: Race, Cinema, and Ethnographic Spectacle. Duke University Press. ISBN 978-0-8223-1840-8.
- Rosenthal, Alan; Corner, John, eds. (13 May 2005). New Challenges for Documentary: Second Edition (2 ed.). Manchester University Press. ISBN 978-0-7190-6899-7.
- Rothman, William (28 January 1997). Documentary Film Classics. Cambridge University Press. ISBN 978-0-521-45681-4.
- Ruoff, Jeffrey, ed. (3 January 2006). Virtual Voyages: Cinema and Travel. Duke University Press. ISBN 978-0-8223-3713-3.
- Russell, Catherine (21 April 1999). Experimental Ethnography: The Work of Film in the Age of Video. Duke University Press. ISBN 978-0-8223-2319-8.
- Sherman, Sharon R. (24 December 1997). Documenting Ourselves: Film, Video, and Culture. University Press of Kentucky. ISBN 978-0-8131-0934-3.
- Steven, Peter, ed. (October 1985). Jump cut: Hollywood, politics, and counter cinema. Praeger. ISBN 978-0-03-001964-7.
- Stubbs, Liz (1 August 2002). Documentary Filmmakers Speak. Allworth Press. ISBN 978-1-58115-236-4.
- Swann, Paul (28 July 1989). The British Documentary Film Movement, 1926-1946. Cambridge University Press. ISBN 978-0-521-33479-2.
- Wahlberg, Malin (29 February 2008). Documentary Time: Film and Phenomenology. University of Minnesota Press. ISBN 978-0-8166-4969-3.
- Waldman, Diane; Walker, Janet, eds. (1 March 1999). Feminism And Documentary. U of Minnesota Press. ISBN 978-0-8166-3007-3.
- Walker, Janet (18 April 2005). Trauma Cinema: Documenting Incest and the Holocaust. University of California Press. ISBN 978-0-520-24175-6.
- Ward, Paul (2005). Documentary: the margins of reality. Wallflower. ISBN 978-1-904764-59-5.
- Warren, Charles, ed. (31 May 1996). Beyond Document: Essays on Nonfiction Film. Wesleyan University Press. ISBN 978-0-8195-6290-6.
- Waugh, Thomas, ed. (January 1984). "Show us life": toward a history and aesthetics of the committed documentary. Scarecrow Press. ISBN 978-0-8108-1706-7.
- Winston, Brian (1 January 2000). Lies, Damn Lies and Documentaries. British Film Institute. ISBN 978-0-85170-797-6.
- Winston, Brian (15 January 2009). Claiming the Real: Documentary: Grierson and Beyond (2 ed.). British Film Institute. ISBN 978-1-84457-271-7.

== See also ==
- Bibliography of film by genre
