= Kathy Bowlen =

Australian journalist and television presenter

Kathy Bowlen is a former Australian journalist and television presenter for the Australian Broadcasting Corporation (ABC).

== Career ==
Bowlen was host of the Victorian edition of ABC's Stateline current affairs program and a presenter with ABC TV News for a decade. She also reported for ABC News Victoria, the nightly current affairs program The 7.30 Report, spent two years as the host of the national breakfast news First Edition and the international program Asia Focus.

In addition to her television work, she has been a director on various boards; including nine years as a member of the University Council of Swinburne University of Technology in Melbourne, from which she graduated with a degree in media communications. She started her media career at Melbourne's 3AW radio station and then spent several years as a political reporter in Canberra.

In December 2008, Bowlen presented her final program with the ABC, and joined the Australian Red Cross Blood Service as national media manager. After her years at the blood service, she was appointed Communications and Media Manager, then promoted to General Manager, Media and Communications at Melbourne's St Vincent's Hospital. Bowlen left St Vincent's in 2019 to become the inaugural Executive General Manager, Communications & Stakeholder Relations at the Australian Financial Complaints Authority (AFCA).
