= Bowes & Bowes =

Former publisher in Cambridge, England

Coordinates: 52.205°N 0.118°E

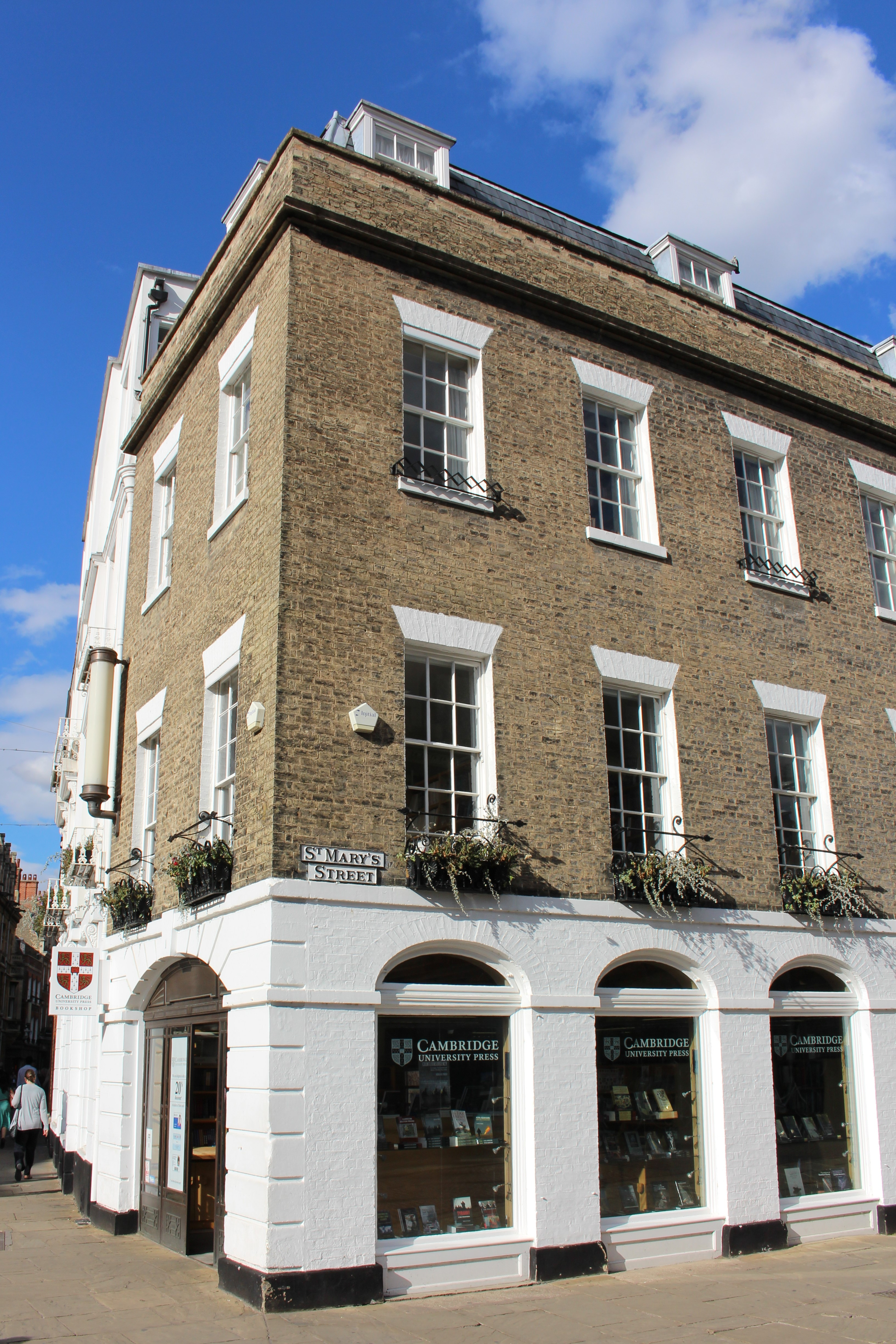
1 Trinity Street, site of Bowes & Bowes, now Cambridge University Press

Bowes & Bowes was a bookselling and publishing company based in Cambridge, England.

== History ==
The firm was established by Robert Bowes (1835–1919), a nephew of Daniel Macmillan (1813–1857) who, with his brother Alexander, founded a firm which by 1850 was a thriving bookshop with the official name ‘Macmillan & Co.’ The same bookshop was eventually owned by Alexander Macmillan in partnership with Robert Bowes. The company became known as ‘Bowes & Bowes’ in 1907, after George Brimley Bowes (1874-1946, Robert Bowes’ son) became a partner in the business in 1899. The firm continued as a family business until 1953 when it was acquired by W H Smith, who continued to operate it under the original name until 1986. In that year the business’s name was changed to Sherratt & Hughes.

The Bowes & Bowes site at 1, Trinity Street, Cambridge has a claim to be the oldest bookshop in the country, books having been sold there since 1581. Since the closure of Sherratt & Hughes in 1992, the site has been the home of the Cambridge University Press bookshop.

The firm’s backlist included titles by Erich Heller, who was also the general editor of a series of books published by Bowes & Bowes (Studies in Modern European Literature and Thought, some of which were printed in the Netherlands).

== Sherratt & Hughes ==
In 1898 John Sherratt and Joseph David Hughes opened a bookshop in Manchester. Sherratt was in charge of the printing and publishing, whilst Hughes was in charge of selling books. In 1905 Sherratt & Hughes owned a bookshop at 27 St. Ann Street in Manchester and another shop at 65 Long Acre in London. Before 1913 Sherratt & Hughes did printing and distribution for the University of Manchester and the Publications Committee of the University. Sherratt & Hughes was taken over by W H Smith in 1946; in April 1992 the subsidiary Sherratt & Hughes ceased to operate.

== See also ==
- Macmillan Publishers (on the Macmillan brothers)
- Our Price (on the subject of Sherratt & Hughes)
- W. H. Smith & Son
- Book trade in the United Kingdom
- Books in the United Kingdom
