= Robert Bowes (publisher) =

Scottish bookseller and publisher

Robert Bowes (born 22 August 1835, near Stewarton, Ayrshire, Scotland – died 9 February 1919, Park Terrace, Cambridge. England) was a Scottish bookseller and publisher. He is known for A Catalogue of Books Printed at or relating to the University, Town & County of Cambridge, from 1521 to 1893 : with Bibliographical and Biographical Notes 1891–1894 (praised by David McKitterick as "monumental and still unsuperseded").

== Biography ==
Robert Bowes's mother was born Margaret Macmillan, an older sister of Daniel and Alexander Macmillan, the founders of Macmillan Publishers. At an early age Robert Bowes was sent to Cambridge, England to work in his uncles' business, which consisted of "bookselling, publishing, printing, and the supply of stationery". In 1851 Bowes was an apprentice living in Cambridge with his uncle Alexander in the bookshop at 1 Trinity Street, where books had been sold since 1581. In its early years, the Macmillan business consisted mainly of academic books, with a few works of fiction — one major success was publication in 1855 of Charles Kingsley's Westward Ho! and another was publication in 1857 of Thomas Hughes's Tom Brown's School Days.

In 1858 Bowes, his uncle Daniel having died in 1857, was sent by his uncle Alexander to London to take charge of the company's newly founded branch at 23 Henrietta Street, Covent Garden.

It was at this period that Alexander Macmillan began coming to London every Thursday to host his celebrated “tobacco parliaments”. Leading writers across many diverse fields – Alfred Tennyson, Herbert Spencer, T. H. Huxley, Francis Turner Palgrave, Coventry Patmore, Charles Kingsley, Thomas Hughes ... and others would gather for evening feasts of “talk, tobacco and tipple”. These were the brains behind the enduring Victorian success of Macmillan’s Magazine which commenced in 1859.

By 1863 Alexander Macmillan moved to London, whilst Robert Bowes returned moved back to Cambridge to work at the Trinity Street bookshop. In April 1868 Bowes married Fanny Brimley (1831–1903), younger sister of Alexander Macmillan’s wife, Caroline. Fanny and Caroline were sisters of the essayist and literary critic George Brimley. Robert and Fanny Bowes had two daughters, Mabel Ethel (1869–1957) and Janet Mabel (1871–1944), and a son George Edmund (1874–1946).

Bowes's mother Margaret, sister of Daniel and Alexander Macmillan, emigrated to America with her husband Robert Bowes Senior, and lived at Waltham, Illinois. After Robert Senior's death, she returned to live with her son at Cambridge, where she died in 1890.

By 1881 Robert Bowes was a full partner in the Trinity Street bookshop. As a publisher, one of his noteworthy successes was James Kenneth Stephen's Lapsus Calami in 1891. After Bowes became a full partner, the bookshop was called "Macmillan & Bowes". His son George Edmund Brimley Bowes joined the Macmillan & Bowes firm in 1897 and became a partner in 1899. In 1907 the name of the business was changed from "Macmillan & Bowes" to "Bowes & Bowes". Upon Robert Bowes's death in 1919, George Edmund Brimley Bowes, a graduate of Emmanuel College, Cambridge, became the head of Bowes & Bowes. In 1953 the Bowes family sold the business to W H Smith.

Robert Bowes was the president of the Antiquarian Booksellers Association in 1914; his son was the Association's president in 1923.

The Bowes & Bowes archive, comprising early cash books, journals and letter-books, and a run of printed catalogues is preserved at the University of Reading.

Robert Bowes, his wife and several other members of the Bowes family are buried in Mill Road Cemetery, Cambridge.
