= Friedo Lampe =

German writer (1899–1945)

- Born: 4 December 1899; Bremen, German Empire
- Died: 2 May 1945 (aged 45); Berlin, Germany

Friedo Lampe (4 December 1899 – 2 May 1945) was a German writer, librarian, and editor. Lampe was a gay writer during the Third Reich; he was shot in Berlin a few days before the end of World War II by the Red Army on 2 May 1945. His works remained unknown throughout his life.

== Early life ==
Lampe was born in Bremen on 4 December 1899. He was diagnosed at the age of five with bone tuberculosis in his left ankle. He read literature, art history, and philosophy at Heidelberg (with Friedrich Gundolf and Karl Jaspers), Munich, and Fribourg (with Edmund Husserl). In 1928, he obtained his PhD, which focused on the "Songs of Two Lovers" by Goeckingk and he met the medievalist Margarete Kühn, with whom he formed an enduring Platonic relationship, spending one or two evenings a week with her when they were both living in Berlin in the 1940s. Despite his homosexuality, the pair planned to marry after the war.

== Career ==
He returned to Bremen to work as a writer and editor at the family magazine Schünemann Monatshefte. Due to the Great Depression, the magazine ceased publication and in 1932 Lampe found work in book acquisitions with Hamburg's public libraries. He becomes involved with a circle of writers and literature enthusiasts, among them the brothers Joachim Maass and Edgar Maass, Martin Beheim-Schwarzenback, and Wilhelm Emanuel Süskind.

Lampe's first novel, Am Rande der Nacht (At the Edge of the Night), was published by Rowohlt at the end of October 1933. In December 1933, the book was seized by the Nazis, withdrawn from sale, and included on their ‘list of damaging and undesirable writings’. This was due to the homoerotic content of the novel, and its depiction of an interracial relationship between a German woman and a black man.

In 1937 moved to Berlin, where he accepted a job as an editor with Rowohlt. In December 1937 published his second novel, Septembergewitter (September Storm). The book was not a success despite positive reviews, due to the bad timing of its release. Lampe continued to work with Rowohlt until it was seized and closed by the Nazis in September 1939.

He wrote very little during the War due to his fear of the Nazi regime. During the air raid on Berlin on 22/23 November 1943, Lampe's flat was destroyed, including his collection of books. In letters, he reports that losing his collection was "the worst thing".

== Death ==
On 2 May 1945, in Kleinmachnow just outside Berlin, two Red Army soldiers stopped him, demanding his papers, but he had lost so much weight he did not resemble the photograph on his papers. He was shot a few minutes later because he failed to explain himself to the soldiers.

== Publication of At the Edge of Night ==
Am Rande der Nacht (At the Edge of Night) was first published in October 1933, but in December 1933, the book was seized by the Nazis and pulled from sale. Lampe said his novel was “born into a regime where it could not breathe,” and hoped it would find a second life at a later date.

The book was republished in 1949, 1955, and 1986 in German with offending passages removed. The first unexpurgated reprint edition was released in 1999, the centenary of Lampe's birth.

The first English translation of At the Edge of Night, translated by Simon Beattie, was published by Hesperus Press in May 2019.
