= Bibliography of film: film noir =

A list of reference works on the film noir genre of film. See Bibliography of film by genre for other genres.

== Books ==
- Auerbach, Jonathan (4 March 2011). Dark Borders: Film Noir and American Citizenship. Duke University Press. ISBN 978-0-8223-5006-4.
- Auger, Emily E. (26 September 2011). Tech-Noir Film: A Theory of the Development of Popular Genres. Intellect Books. ISBN 978-1-84150-424-7.
- Biesen, Sheri Chinen (12 October 2005). Blackout: World War II and the Origins of Film Noir. JHU Press. ISBN 978-0-8018-8217-3.
- Borde, Raymond; Chaumeton, Etienne (1 November 2002). A Panorama of American Film Noir (1941-1953). City Lights Books. ISBN 978-0-87286-412-2.
- Bould, Mark (15 December 2005). Film Noir: From Berlin to Sin City. Wallflower Press. ISBN 978-1-904764-50-2.
- Brook, Vincent (18 September 2009). Driven to Darkness: Jewish Emigre Directors and the Rise of Film Noir. Rutgers University Press. ISBN 978-0-8135-4833-3.
- Buss, Robin (1 April 2001). French Film Noir. Marion Boyars Publishers Limited. ISBN 978-0-7145-3036-9.
- Conard, Mark T. (17 August 2007). The Philosophy of Film Noir. University Press of Kentucky. ISBN 978-0-8131-9181-2.
- Crowther, Bruce (31 December 2011). Film Noir. Random House. ISBN 978-0-7535-4607-9.
- Clute, Shannon Scott; Edwards, Richard L. (June 2012). The Maltese Touch of Evil: Film Noir and Potential Criticism. UPNE. ISBN 978-1-61168-185-7.
- Dickos, Andrew (7 June 2002). Street with No Name: A History of the Classic American Film Noir. University Press of Kentucky. ISBN 978-0-8131-2243-4.
- Dimendberg, Edward (2004). Film Noir and the Spaces of Modernity. Harvard University Press. ISBN 978-0-674-01346-9.
- Dixon, Wheeler W. (April 2009). Film noir and the cinema of paranoia. Rutgers University Press. ISBN 978-0-8135-4520-2.
- Duncan, Paul (1 July 2000). Film noir. Pocket Essentials. ISBN 978-1-903047-08-8.
- Faison, Stephen E. (30 November 2008). Existentialism, Film Noir, and Hard-Boiled Fiction. Cambria Press. ISBN 978-1-60497-573-4.
- Flory, Dan (15 June 2008). Philosophy, Black Film, Film Noir. Penn State Press. ISBN 978-0-271-03344-0.
- Gifford, Barry (2001). Out of the Past: Adventures in Film Noir. Univ. Press of Mississippi. ISBN 978-1-57806-290-4.
- Grant, John (15 October 2013). A Comprehensive Encyclopedia of Film Noir: The Definitive Reference Guide. Limelight. ISBN 978-1-55783-831-5.
- Hanson, Helen (15 December 2007). Hollywood Heroines: Women in Film Noir and the Female Gothic Film. I.B.Tauris. ISBN 978-1-84511-561-6.
- Hare, William (2003). Early Film Noir: Greed, Lust and Murder Hollywood Style. McFarland. ISBN 978-0-7864-1629-5.
- Kaplan, E. Ann (1998). Women in film noir. British Film Institute. ISBN 978-0-85170-666-5.
- Keating, Patrick (2010). Hollywood Lighting from the Silent Era to Film Noir. Columbia University Press. ISBN 978-0-231-52020-1.
- Krutnik, Frank (22 August 1991). In a Lonely Street: Film Noir, Genre, Masculinity. Taylor & Francis. ISBN 978-0-415-02630-7.
- Luhr, William (13 March 2012). Film Noir. John Wiley & Sons. ISBN 978-1-4051-4594-7.
- Mayer, Geoff; McDonnell, Brian (30 June 2007). Encyclopedia of Film Noir. ABC-CLIO. ISBN 978-0-313-33306-4.
- Naremore, James (14 January 2008). More than Night: Film Noir in Its Contexts. University of California Press. ISBN 978-0-520-25402-2.
- Nieland, Justus (29 September 2009). Film Noir. Taylor & Francis. ISBN 978-0-415-45812-2.
- Palmer, R. Barton (August 1996). Perspectives on film noir. G.K. Hall. ISBN 978-0-8161-1601-0.
- Park, William (16 September 2011). What is Film Noir?. Rowman & Littlefield. ISBN 978-1-61148-363-5.
- Phillips, Gene D. (3 November 2011). Out of the Shadows: Expanding the Canon of Classic Film Noir. Scarecrow Press. ISBN 978-0-8108-8189-1.
- Pippin, Robert B. (28 February 2012). Fatalism in American Film Noir: Some Cinematic Philosophy. University of Virginia Press. ISBN 978-0-8139-3189-0.
- Renzi, Thomas C. (24 January 2012). Screwball Comedy and Film Noir: Unexpected Connections. McFarland. ISBN 978-0-7864-6672-6.
- Renzi, Thomas C. (31 January 2006). Cornell Woolrich: From Pulp Noir to Film Noir. McFarland. ISBN 978-0-7864-2351-4.
- Robson, Eddie (1 September 2005). Film noir. Virgin. ISBN 978-0-7535-1086-5.
- Rode, Alan K. (2008). Charles McGraw: Biography of a Film Noir Tough Guy. McFarland. ISBN 978-0-7864-3167-0.
- Selby, Spencer (1984). Dark city: the film noir. McFarland. ISBN 978-0-7864-0478-0.
- Smith, Imogen Sara (3 August 2011). In Lonely Places: Film Noir Beyond the City. McFarland. ISBN 978-0-7864-6305-3.
- Spicer, Andrew (15 May 2007). European Film Noir. Manchester University Press. ISBN 978-0-7190-6791-4.
- Spicer, Andrew (2002). Film Noir. Longman. ISBN 978-0-582-43712-8.
- Spicer, Andrew (30 March 2010). Historical Dictionary of Film Noir. Scarecrow Press. ISBN 978-0-8108-5960-9.
- Stephens, Michael L. (30 January 2006). Film Noir: A Comprehensive, Illustrated Reference to Movies, Terms, and Persons. McFarland & Company. ISBN 978-0-7864-2628-7.
- Telotte, J P. (1 December 1988). Voices in the Dark: THE NARRATIVE PATTERNS OF *FILM NOIR*. University of Illinois Press. ISBN 978-0-252-06056-4.
- Wager, Jans B. (1 September 2005). Dames in the Driver's Seat: Rereading Film Noir. University of Texas Press. ISBN 978-0-292-70966-9.

Starman, Ray (2006)," TV Noir:the 20th Century", The Troy Bookmakers Press, Troy NY. 2nd edition, Amazon Books (2010), ISBN 978-1453696002
