= Clive Farahar =

British dealer and expert on books and manuscripts

- Born: 1953 (age 72–73)
- Occupations: Television presenter; antiques expert; former book merchant; writer/lecturer
- Known for: Specialising in books and manuscripts
- Television: Antiques Roadshow

Clive Farahar (born 1953) is a British dealer and expert on books and manuscripts. He is best known as an expert on the BBC's Antiques Roadshow, which he joined in 1986.

== Biography ==
=== Early life ===
Farahar is the son of Robert Farahar, a geologist and Joan (née Hutchins) Farahar, he attended Westminster Abbey Choir School.

=== Career ===
He joined Francis Edwards Ltd, a bookdealer in London's Marylebone High Street on leaving school in 1969. Joining the travel department he spent his first month in the bookshop dusting the shelves in order to become acquainted with the stock.

In 1972 Farahar joined the staff of a bookshop in Culham, between Abingdon and Oxford, before becoming a market trader at Bath Antiques Market where he sold books during the week and worked as a wine waiter at weekends in order to make ends meet. In the summer of 1976 he met his wife, Sophie Dupré, the manuscript specialist, and in 1979 he became a partner in Francis Edwards in London where he took responsibility for a new book investment scheme. However, the venture failed and the receivers were called in. The new owner of Francis Edwards invited Farahar back as manager but when the business moved to Hay-on-Wye in order to reduce costs Farahar decided to leave and set up his own antiquarian travel book business. He and his family had moved to their home in Calne in Wiltshire in 1980 where Sophie had already set up her autograph and manuscript business.

Clive Farahar writes and lectures and is a member of the Antiquarian Booksellers Association. He became an expert on the BBC's Antiques Roadshow programme in 1986. In 2003, when the Antiques Roadshow visited Dumfries in Scotland, Farahar identified a collection of 23 drawings and watercolours as the work of Beatrix Potter. He valued the collection at £250,000.
