= John Parker (author) =

British author and journalist (born 1938)

John Parker (born 5 August 1938) is a British author and journalist.

After leaving school, Parker found work at the Northampton Chronicle and Echo and worked in a number of local newspapers before getting a job in the Bahamas with the Nassau Daily Tribune. After working for Life, he returned to the UK to work for the Daily Mirror as a sub-editor.

== Books ==
Parker has had more than 40 books published in hardback, including several on military and investigative topics and a number of biographies.

- King of Fools 1988 (on the Duke of Windsor)
- Five for Hollywood 1989
- The Princess Royal 1989
- Prince Philip: A Critical Biography 1990
- The Trial of Rock Hudson 1990
- The Queen 1991
- The Joker's Wild: The Biography of Jack Nicholson 1991
- Warren Beatty: The Last Great Lover of Hollywood 1993
- Sean Connery 1993
- At the Heart of Darkness: Witchcraft, Black Magic and Satanism in Britain Today 1993
- Elvis: The Secret Files 1993
- Elvis: Murdered by the Mob 1993
- Polanski 1993
- Richard Gere: The Flesh and the Spirit 1995
- The Walking Dead: A Woman's Brave Stand Against the Mafia 1995
- De Niro 1996
- The Killing Factory: The Top Secret World of Germ and Chemical Warfare 1996
- Bruce Willis: The Unauthorised Biography 1997
- SBS: The Inside Story of the Special Boat Squadron 1997
- Inside the Foreign Legion: The Sensational Story of the World's Toughest Army 1998
- The Gurkhas: The Inside Story of the World's Most Feared Soldiers 1999
- Death of a Hero: Captain Robert Nairac, GC and the Undercover War in Northern Ireland 1999
- Commandos: The Inside Story of Britain's Most Elite Fighting Force 2000
- Total Surveillance: Investigating the Big Brother World of e-Spies, Eavesdroppers and CCTV 2000
- The Silent Service: The Inside Story of the Royal Navy's Submarine Heroes 2001
- Strike Command: The Inside Story of the RAF's Warfare Heroes 2002
- Task Force: Untold Stories of the Heroes of the Royal Navy 2003
- SBS: The Inside Story of the Special Boat Service 2003
- Secret Hero: The Life and Mysterious Death of Captain Robert Nairac 2004
- Desert Rats: From El Alamein to Basra 2005
- Black Watch: The Inside Story of the Oldest Highland Regiment in the British Army 2005
- Wild: The Biography of Jack Nicholson 2005
- Royal Marines Commandos: The Inside Story of a Force for the Future 2006
- The Submarine: An Illustrated History from 1900 to 1950 2008
- Robert De Niro: Portrait of a Legend 2009
- Arise, Sir Sean Connery 2009
- Modern Submarines: An Illustrated Reference Guide to Underwater Vessels of the World 2009
- Michael Douglas: Acting on Instinct 2011
- The Paras: The Inside Story of Britain's Toughest Regiment 2012
- The Gurkhas: An Updated In-Depth Investigation into the History and Mystique of the Gurkha Regiments 2013
- The Rocky Road: From Japanese Occupation to Rock & Roll Stardom 2013 (with Tony Rocco)
- The Illustrated Encyclopedia of Destroyers, Frigates & Submarines: A History of Destroyers, Frigates and Underwater Vessels from Around the World 2015 (with Bernard Ireland)
- Jack Nicholson: The Biography 2017
