= Bibliography of film: horror =

A list of reference works on the horror genre of film.

== Books ==
- Ancuta, Katarzyna (6 December 2005). Where angels fear to hover: between the gothic disease and the meataphysics of horror. P. Lang. ISBN 978-3-631-54448-8.
- Andriano, Joseph (1999). Immortal Monster: The Mythological Evolution of the Fantastic Beast in Modern Fiction and Film. Greenwood Publishing Group. ISBN 978-0-313-30667-9.
- Badley, Linda (1995). Film, Horror, and the Body Fantastic. Greenwood Publishing Group. ISBN 978-0-313-27523-4.
- Balmain, Colette (2008). Introduction to Japanese Horror Film. Edinburgh University Press. ISBN 978-0-7486-2475-1.
- Barron, Neil, ed. (1 August 1999). Fantasy and horror: a critical and historical guide to literature, illustration, film, TV, radio, and the Internet. Scarecrow Press. ISBN 978-0-8108-3596-2.
- Baumgartner, Holly Lynn; Davis, Roger, eds. (2008). Hosting the Monster. Rodopi. ISBN 978-90-420-2486-1.
- Becker, Susanne (1999). Gothic Forms of Feminine Fictions. Manchester University Press. ISBN 978-0-7190-5331-3.
- Bellin, Joshua David (10 March 2005). Framing Monsters: Fantasy Film and Social Alienation. SIU Press. ISBN 978-0-8093-2624-2.
- Benshoff, Harry M. (15 November 1997). Monsters in the Closet: Homosexuality and the Horror Film. Manchester University Press ND. ISBN 978-0-7190-4473-1.
- Berenstein, Rhona J. (1996). Attack of the Leading Ladies: Gender, Sexuality, and Spectatorship in Classic Horror Cinema. Columbia University Press. ISBN 978-0-231-08463-5.
- Botting, Fred; Townshend, Dale, eds. (2004). Gothic: Nineteenth-century Gothic: At home with the vampire. Taylor & Francis. ISBN 978-0-415-25115-0.
- Brabon, Benjamin A.; Genz, Stéphanie (15 March 2007). Postfeminist Gothic: Critical Interventions in Contemporary Culture. Palgrave Macmillan. ISBN 978-0-230-00542-6.
- Brottman, Mikita (3 October 2005). Offensive Films. Vanderbilt University Press. ISBN 978-0-8265-1491-2.
- Carroll, Noel (19 January 1990). The Philosophy of Horror: Or, Paradoxes of the Heart. Psychology Press. ISBN 978-0-415-90216-8.
- Clemens, Valdine (1999). The return of the repressed: gothic horror from the Castle of Otranto to Alien. State University of New York Press. ISBN 978-0-7914-4328-6.
- Clover, Carol J. (22 March 1993). Men, Women, and Chain Saws: Gender in Modern Horror Film. Princeton University Press. ISBN 978-0-691-00620-8.
- Colavito, Jason (2008). Knowing fear: science, knowledge and the development of the horror genre. McFarland & Co. ISBN 978-0-7864-3273-8.
- Conrich, Ian, ed. (15 December 2009). Horror zone: the cultural experience of contemporary horror cinema. I. B. Tauris. ISBN 978-1-84885-262-4.
- Cotter, Bobb (April 2005). The Mexican masked wrestler and monster filmography. McFarland & Co. ISBN 978-0-7864-2022-3.
- Crane, Jonathan Lake (19 September 1994). Terror and Everyday Life: Singular Moments in the History of the Horror Film. SAGE. ISBN 978-0-8039-5849-4.
- Creed, Barbara (15 November 1993). The Monstrous-Feminine: Film, Feminism, Psychoanalysis. Taylor & Francis. ISBN 978-0-415-05259-7.
- Deal, David (30 June 2007). Television fright films of the 1970s. McFarland. ISBN 978-0-7864-2929-5.
- Derry, Charles (29 October 2009). Dark Dreams 2.0: A Psychological History of the Modern Horror Film from the 1950s to the 21st Century. McFarland. ISBN 978-0-7864-3397-1.
- Dika, Vera (1990). Games of terror: Halloween, Friday the 13th, and the films of the stalker cycle. Fairleigh Dickinson University Press. ISBN 978-0-8386-3364-9.
- Donald, James, ed. (1 January 1989). Fantasy and the Cinema. British Film Institute. ISBN 978-0-85170-229-2.
- Dyson, Jeremy (1997). Bright darkness: the lost art of the supernatural horror film. Cassell. ISBN 978-0-304-70037-0.
- Edmundson, Mark (1999). Nightmare on Main Street: Angels, Sadomasochism, and the Culture of Gothic (2 ed.). Harvard University Press. ISBN 978-0-674-62463-4.
- Everson, William K. (1974). Classics of the horror film. Citadel Press. ISBN 978-0-8065-0437-7.
- Everson, William K. (December 1994). More Classics of the Horror Film. Virgin Books Limited. ISBN 978-0-86369-813-2.
- Fahy, Thomas, ed. (30 April 2010). The Philosophy of Horror. University Press of Kentucky. ISBN 978-0-8131-7370-2.
- Fischer, Dennis (15 May 2011). Horror Film Directors, 1931–1990. McFarland & Company Incorporated. ISBN 978-0-7864-6090-8.
- Fonseca, Anthony J.; Pulliam, June Michele (30 January 2003). Hooked on horror: a guide to reading interests in horror fiction (2 ed.). Libraries Unlimited. ISBN 978-1-56308-904-6.
- Frank, Alan (March 1982). The horror film handbook. Barnes & Noble Books. ISBN 978-0-389-20260-8.
- Frank, Alan (1983). Horror Films. Spring Books. ISBN 978-0-600-38541-7.
- Freeland, Cynthia (4 January 2002). The Naked And The Undead: Evil And The Appeal Of Horror. Westview Press. ISBN 978-0-8133-6563-3.
- Gelder, Ken (30 August 2000). The Horror Reader. Psychology Press. ISBN 978-0-415-21356-1.
- Glut, Donald F. (1 February 1978). Classic movie monsters. Scarecrow Press. ISBN 978-0-8108-1049-5.
- Grant, Barry Keith, ed. (1996). The dread of difference: gender and the horror film. University of Texas Press. ISBN 978-0-292-72793-9.
- Grant, Barry Keith; Sharrett, Christopher, eds. (2004). Planks of Reason: Essays on the Horror Film. Scarecrow Press. ISBN 978-0-8108-5013-2.
- Greene, Doyle (2 May 2007). The Mexican Cinema of Darkness: A critical study of six landmark horror and exploitation films, 1969–1988. McFarland & Co. ISBN 978-0-7864-2999-8.
- Halberstam, Judith (22 August 1995). Skin Shows: Gothic Horror and the Technology of Monsters (2 ed.). Duke University Press. ISBN 978-0-8223-1663-3.
- Hallenbeck, Bruce G. (7 June 2009). Comedy-Horror Films: A Chronological History, 1914–2008. McFarland. ISBN 978-0-7864-3332-2.
- Hand, Richard J.; McRoy, Jay, eds. (2007). Monstrous adaptations: generic and thematic mutations in horror film. Manchester University Press. ISBN 978-0-7190-7603-9.
- Handling, Piers, ed. (1983). The Shape of Rage: The Films of David Cronenberg. General Pub. Co. ISBN 978-0-7736-1137-5.
- Hanich, Julian (9 March 2010). Cinematic Emotion in Horror Films and Thrillers: The Aesthetic Paradox of Pleasurable Fear. Routledge. ISBN 978-0-415-87139-6.
- Hanke, Ken (1 October 1991). A Critical Guide to Horror Film Series. Taylor & Francis. ISBN 978-0-8240-5545-5.
- Hanson, Helen (15 December 2007). Hollywood Heroines: Women in Film Noir and the Female Gothic Film. I.B.Tauris. ISBN 978-1-84511-561-6.
- Hantke, Steffen, ed. (February 2007). Caligari's heirs: the German cinema of fear after 1945. Scarecrow Press. ISBN 978-0-8108-5878-7.
- Hantke, Steffen, ed. (9 September 2009). Horror Film: Creating and Marketing Fear. Univ. Press of Mississippi. ISBN 978-1-60473-376-1.
- Hantke, Steffen, ed. (1 June 2010). American Horror Film: The Genre at the Turn of the Millennium. Univ. Press of Mississippi. ISBN 978-1-60473-453-9.
- Hardy, Phil; Milne, Tom; Willemen, Paul, eds. (1 October 1995). The Overlook film encyclopedia: Horror. Overlook Press. ISBN 978-0-87951-624-6.
- Hawkins, Joan (8 May 2000). Cutting Edge: Art-Horror and the Horrific Avant-garde. University of Minnesota Press. ISBN 978-0-8166-3413-2.
- Hayward, Philip (29 July 2009). Terror tracks: music, sound and horror cinema. Equinox. ISBN 978-1-84553-202-4.
- Heffernan, Kevin (4 March 2004). Ghouls, Gimmicks, and Gold: Horror Films and the American Movie Business, 1953–1968. Duke University Press. ISBN 978-0-8223-3215-2.
- Hendershot, Cyndy (1998). The Animal Within: Masculinity and the Gothic. University of Michigan Press. ISBN 978-0-472-10940-1.
- Hills, Matthew (20 June 2005). The Pleasures of Horror. Continuum International Publishing Group. ISBN 978-0-8264-5888-9.
- Hogan, David J. (1997). Dark Romance: Sexuality in the Horror Film. McFarland. ISBN 978-0-7864-0474-2.
- Holston, Kim R.; Winchester, Tom (July 1997). Science fiction, fantasy, and horror film sequels, series, and remakes: an illustrated filmography, with plot synopses and critical commentary. McFarland. ISBN 978-0-7864-0155-0.
- Holte, James Craig (1997). Dracula in the Dark: The Dracula Film Adaptations. Greenwood Publishing Group. ISBN 978-0-313-29215-6.
- Holte, James Craig, ed. (2002). The Fantastic Vampire: Studies in the Children of the Night: Selected Essays from the Eighteenth International Conference on the Fantastic in the Arts. Greenwood Publishing Group. ISBN 978-0-313-30933-5.
- Hopkins, Lisa (1 May 2005). Screening the Gothic. University of Texas Press. ISBN 978-0-292-70646-0.
- Humphries, Reynold (2006). The Hollywood horror film, 1931–1941: madness in a social landscape. Scarecrow Press. ISBN 978-0-8108-5726-1.
- Hutchings, Peter (2004). The horror film. Pearson Longman. ISBN 978-0-582-43794-4.
- Hutchings, Peter (30 September 2009). The A to Z of Horror Cinema. Scarecrow Press. ISBN 978-0-8108-6887-8.
- Iaccino, James F. (30 June 1994). Psychological reflections on cinematic terror: Jungian archetypes in horror films (2 ed.). Praeger. ISBN 978-0-275-94491-9.
- Irons, Glenwood Henry, ed. (1992). Gender, language, and myth: essays on popular narrative. University of Toronto Press. ISBN 978-0-8020-5004-5.
- Jancovich, Mark (1 January 1994). American horror from 1951 to the present. Keele University Press. ISBN 978-1-85331-149-9.
- Jancovich, Mark (1996). Rational Fears: American Horror in the 1950s. Manchester University Press ND. ISBN 978-0-7190-3623-1.
- Jensen, Paul M. (1996). The men who made the monsters. Twayne. ISBN 978-0-8057-9338-3.
- Jones, E. Michael (May 2000). Monsters from the Id: the rise of horror in fiction and film. Spence Pub. Co. ISBN 978-1-890626-06-8.
- Joshi, S. T., ed. (2006). Icons of Horror and the Supernatural. Greenwood Publishing Group. ISBN 978-0-313-08100-2.
- Joslin, Lyndon W. (July 2006). Count Dracula goes to the movies: Stoker's novel adapted, 1922–2003 (2 ed.). McFarland & Co. ISBN 978-0-7864-2601-0.
- Kendrick, Walter (1 October 1992). The Thrill of Fear: 250 Years of Scary Entertainment. Grove Press. ISBN 978-0-8021-3246-8.
- Kinnard, Roy (1 November 1999). Horror in Silent Films: A Filmography, 1896–1929. McFarland. ISBN 978-0-7864-0751-4.
- Kovacs, Lee (30 November 2005). The Haunted Screen: Ghosts in Literature And Film. McFarland. ISBN 978-0-7864-2605-8.
- Leffler, Yvonne (1 December 2000). Horror As Pleasure: The Aesthetics of Horror Fiction. Almqvist & Wiksell. ISBN 978-91-22-01899-5.
- Lentz, Harris M. (2001). Science Fiction, Horror & Fantasy Film and Television Credits: Filmography (2 ed.). McFarland. ISBN 978-0-7864-0951-8.
- Lowenstein, Adam (15 November 2005). Shocking Representation: Historical Trauma, National Cinema, and the Modern Horror Film. Columbia University Press. ISBN 978-0-231-13247-3.
- Maddrey, Joseph (2004). Nightmares in Red, White and Blue: The Evolution of the American Horror Film. McFarland. ISBN 978-0-7864-1860-2.
- Magistrale, Tony (2005). Abject Terrors: Surveying the Modern And Postmodern Horror Film. Peter Lang. ISBN 978-0-8204-7056-6.
- Magistrale, Tony, ed. (15 January 2008). The Films of Stephen King: From Carrie to Secret Window. Macmillan. ISBN 978-0-230-60131-4.
- Manchel, Frank (1970). Terrors of the Screen. Prentice-Hall. ISBN 978-0-13-906792-1.
- Mank, Gregory William (2001). Hollywood Cauldron: Thirteen Horror Films from the Genre's Golden Age. McFarland. ISBN 978-0-7864-1112-2.
- Mank, Gregory William (30 May 2005). Women In Horror Films, 1930s. McFarland. ISBN 978-0-7864-2334-7.
- Mank, Gregory William (28 July 2009). Bela Lugosi and Boris Karloff: The Expanded Story of a Haunting Collaboration, With a Complete Filmography of Their Films Together. McFarland. ISBN 978-0-7864-3480-0.
- Marriott, James (31 March 2012). Horror Films. Random House. ISBN 978-1-4481-3210-2.
- McCarty, John (15 July 1993). Psychos and Madmen: The Definitive Book on Film Psychopaths, from Jekyll and Hyde to Hannibal Lecter. Virgin Books. ISBN 978-0-86369-693-0.
- Mitchell, Charles P. (30 June 2010). The Devil on Screen: Feature Films Worldwide, 1913 Through 2000. McFarland & Company Incorporated. ISBN 978-0-7864-4699-5.
- Morgan, Jack (29 October 2002). The Biology of Horror: Gothic Literature and Film. SIU Press. ISBN 978-0-8093-2471-2.
- Muir, John Kenneth (1 April 2004). Wes Craven: The Art of Horror. McFarland. ISBN 978-0-7864-1923-4.
- Muir, John Kenneth (2 February 2009). Eaten Alive at a Chainsaw Massacre: The Films of Tobe Hooper. MCFARLAND & Company Incorporated. ISBN 978-0-7864-4461-8.
- Muir, John Kenneth (15 September 2011). Horror Films of the 1990s. McFarland. ISBN 978-0-7864-4012-2.
- Newman, Kim, ed. (1996). The BFI Companion to Horror. Cassell. ISBN 978-0-304-33216-8.
- Newman, Kim, ed. (21 May 2002). Science fiction/horror. BFI Publishing. ISBN 978-0-85170-896-6.
- Newman, Kim (18 April 2011). Nightmare Movies: Horror on Screen Since the 1960s. Bloomsbury Publishing. ISBN 978-1-4088-1750-6.
- Nowell, Richard (23 December 2010). Blood Money: A History of the First Teen Slasher Film Cycle. Continuum International Publishing Group. ISBN 978-1-4411-2496-8.
- Ochoa, George (23 March 2011). Deformed and Destructive Beings: The Purpose of Horror Films. McFarland. ISBN 978-0-7864-6307-7.
- Palumbo, Donald, ed. (1 July 1986). Eros in the mind's eye: sexuality and the fantastic in art and film. Greenwood Press. ISBN 978-0-313-24102-4.
- Paul, William (1994). Laughing Screaming: Modern Hollywood Horror and Comedy. Columbia University Press. ISBN 978-0-231-08465-9.
- Paszylk, Bartłomiej (8 March 2009). The Pleasure and Pain of Cult Horror Films: An Historical Survey. McFarland. ISBN 978-0-7864-3695-8.
- Picart, Caroline Joan S.; Frank, David A. (9 October 2006). Frames of Evil: The Holocaust as Horror in American Film. SIU Press. ISBN 978-0-8093-2724-9.
- Pinedo, Isabel Cristina (1997). Recreational Terror: Women and the Pleasures of Horror Film Viewing. SUNY Press. ISBN 978-0-7914-3441-3.
- Pitts, Michael R. (January 2002). Horror Film Stars (3 ed.). McFarland. ISBN 978-0-7864-1052-1.
- Powell, Anna (1 September 2007). Deleuze and Horror Film. Edinburgh University Press. ISBN 978-0-7486-1748-7.
- Powell, Anna; Smith, Andrew, eds. (22 August 2006). Teaching the Gothic. Palgrave Macmillan. ISBN 978-1-4039-4930-1.
- Prawer, S. S. (22 March 1989). Caligari's Children: The Film As Tale Of Terror. Da Capo Press. ISBN 978-0-306-80347-5.
- Prince, Stephen (1 October 2003). Classical Film Violence: Designing and Regulating Brutality in Hollywood Cinema, 1930–1968. Rutgers University Press. ISBN 978-0-8135-3281-3.
- Prince, Stephen, ed. (26 January 2004). The Horror Film. Rutgers University Press. ISBN 978-0-8135-3363-6.
- Quarles, Mike (2001). Down and Dirty: Hollywood's Exploitation Filmmakers and Their Movies. McFarland. ISBN 978-0-7864-1142-9.
- Rankin, Walter (August 2007). Grimm pictures: fairy tale archetypes in eight horror and suspense films. McFarland & Co. ISBN 978-0-7864-3174-8.
- Raphael, Raphael; Siddique, Sophia, eds. (2017). Transnational Horror Cinema: Bodies of Excess and the Global Grotesque. Palgrave Macmillan. ISBN 978-1-137-58416-8.
- Rasmussen, Randy (1 March 2006). Children of the Night: The Six Archetypal Characters of Classic Horror Films. McFarland. ISBN 978-0-7864-2725-3.
- Rhodes, Gary Don (2003). Horror at the Drive-In: Essays in Popular Americana. McFarland. ISBN 978-0-7864-1342-3.
- Rockett, Will H. (17 November 1988). Devouring whirlwind: terror and transcendence in the cinema of cruelty. Greenwood Press. ISBN 978-0-313-25998-2.
- Royer, Carl; Royer, Diana (28 June 2005). The Spectacle of Isolation in Horror Films: Dark Parades. Taylor & Francis. ISBN 978-0-7890-2264-6.
- Schaefer, Eric (20 September 1999). "Bold! Daring! Shocking! True!": A History of Exploitation Films, 1919–1959. Duke University Press. ISBN 978-0-8223-2374-7.
- Schneider, Steven Jay, ed. (2003). Fear without frontiers: horror cinema across the globe. FAB. ISBN 978-1-903254-15-8.
- Schneider, Steven Jay, ed. (28 June 2004). Horror Film and Psychoanalysis: Freud's Worst Nightmare. Cambridge University Press. ISBN 978-0-521-82521-4.
- Schneider, Steven Jay; Shaw, Daniel, eds. (2003). Dark Thoughts: Philosophic Reflections on Cinematic Horror. Scarecrow Press. ISBN 978-0-8108-4792-7.
- Schneider, Steven Jay; Williams, Tony, eds. (30 September 2005). Horror International. Wayne State University Press. ISBN 978-0-8143-3101-9.
- Schoell, William (3 December 1985). Stay out of the shower: 25 years of shocker films, beginning with "Psycho". Dembner Books. ISBN 978-0-934878-61-6.
- Senn, Bryan; Johnson, John (November 1992). Fantastic cinema subject guide: a topical index to 2500 horror, science fiction, and fantasy films. McFarland & Co. ISBN 978-0-89950-681-4.
- Sevastakis, Michael (May 1993). Songs of love and death: the classical American horror film of the 1930s. Greenwood Press. ISBN 978-0-313-27949-2.
- Sherman, Fraser A. (2000). Cyborgs, Santa Claus, and Satan: science fiction, fantasy, and horror films made for television. McFarland. ISBN 978-0-7864-0793-4.
- Short, Sue (9 January 2007). Misfit Sisters: Screen Horror as Female Rites of Passage. Palgrave Macmillan. ISBN 978-0-230-00020-9.
- Silver, Alain; Ursini, James (1994). More Things Than are Dreamt of: Masterpieces of Supernatural Horror, from Mary Shelley to Stephen King, in Literature and Film. Hal Leonard Corporation. ISBN 978-0-87910-177-0.
- Silver, Alain; Ursini, James, eds. (1 October 2000). The Horror Film Reader. Hal Leonard Corporation. ISBN 978-0-87910-297-5.
- Sipos, Thomas M. (6 May 2010). Horror Film Aesthetics: Creating The Visual Language of Fear. McFarland. ISBN 978-0-7864-4972-9.
- Skal, David J. (1998). Screams of Reason: Mad Science and Modern Culture. W. W. Norton & Company. ISBN 978-0-393-04582-6.
- Skal, David J. (15 October 2001). The Monster Show: A Cultural History of Horror. Macmillan. ISBN 978-0-571-19996-9.
- Skal, David J.; Savada, Elias (1995). Dark carnival: the secret world of Tod Browning—Hollywood's master of the macabre. Anchor Books. ISBN 978-0-385-47406-1.
- Smith, Angela (18 November 2011). Hideous Progeny: Disability, Eugenics, and Classic Horror Cinema. Columbia University Press. ISBN 978-0-231-15717-9.
- Smith, Don G. (2006). H.P. Lovecraft in Popular Culture: The Works and Their Adaptations in Film, Television, Comics, Music, and Games. McFarland. ISBN 978-0-7864-2091-9.
- Soister, John T. (April 2005). Of Gods And Monsters: A Critical Guide To Universal Studios' Science Fiction, Horror And Mystery Films, 1929–1939. McFarland. ISBN 978-0-7864-2153-4.
- Spadoni, Robert (4 September 2007). Uncanny Bodies: The Coming of Sound Film and the Origins of the Horror Genre. University of California Press. ISBN 978-0-520-25122-9.
- Stell, John C. (1998). Psychos! Sickos! Sequels!: Horror Films of the 1980s. Midnight Marquee Press. ISBN 978-1-887664-16-5.
- Svehla, Gary; Svehla, Susan, eds. (1 August 1996). Bitches, Bimbos, and Virgins: Women in the Horror Film. Midnight Marquee Press. ISBN 978-1-887664-06-6.
- Thompson, Kirsten Moana (8 March 2007). Apocalyptic Dread: American Film at the Turn of the Millennium. SUNY Press. ISBN 978-0-7914-7044-2.
- Tohill, Cathal; Tombs, Pete (15 September 1995). Immoral Tales: European Sex & Horror Movies, 1956–1984. Macmillan. ISBN 978-0-312-13519-5.
- Tudor, Andrew (15 January 1991). Monsters and Mad Scientists: A Cultural History of the Horror Movie. John Wiley & Sons. ISBN 978-0-631-16992-5.
- Turner, George Eugene; Price, Michael H. (1979). Forgotten horrors: early talkie chillers from Poverty Row. A. S. Barnes. ISBN 978-0-498-02136-7.
- Vieira, Mark A. (1 November 2003). Hollywood Horror: From Gothic To Cosmic. Harry N. Abrams. ISBN 978-0-8109-4535-7.
- Waller, Gregory A., ed. (1 November 1987). American Horrors: Essays on the Modern American Horror Film. University of Illinois Press. ISBN 978-0-252-01448-2.
- Waltje, Jörg (2005). Blood Obsession: Vampires, Serial Murder, And The Popular Imagination. Peter Lang. ISBN 978-0-8204-7420-5.
- Weaver, James B.; Tamborini, Ron, eds. (1 January 1996). Horror Films: Current Research on Audience Preferences and Reactions. Taylor & Francis. ISBN 978-0-8058-1174-2.
- Weaver, Tom (1 May 1994). Attack of the monster movie makers: interviews with 20 genre giants. McFarland. ISBN 978-0-7864-0018-8.
- Weaver, Tom (July 1996). It came from Weaver five: interviews with 20 zany, glib, and earnest moviemakers in the SF and horror traditions of the thirties, forties, fifties, and sixties. McFarland & Company. ISBN 978-0-7864-0191-8.
- Weaver, Tom (1 November 1999). Poverty Row Horrors!: Monogram, PRC and Republic Horror Films of the Forties (2 ed.). Mc Farland & Company Incorporated. ISBN 978-0-7864-0798-9.
- Weaver, Tom (30 September 2006). Interviews With B Science Fiction And Horror Movie Makers: Writers, Producers, Directors, Actors, Moguls and Makeup. McFarland. ISBN 978-0-7864-2858-8.
- Weaver, Tom (30 October 2006). Science Fiction Stars and Horror Heroes: Interviews with Actors, Directors, Producers and Writers of the 1940s Through 1960s. McFarland. ISBN 978-0-7864-2857-1.
- Weaver, Tom (1 June 2007). Eye on Science Fiction: 20 Interviews with Classic SF and Horror Filmmakers. McFarland. ISBN 978-0-7864-3028-4.
- Weaver, Tom; Brunas, Michael; Brunas, John (30 June 2007). Universal Horrors: The Studio's Classic Films, 1931–1946 (2 ed.). McFarland. ISBN 978-0-7864-2974-5.
- Weiner, Robert G.; Cline, John, eds. (1 July 2010). Cinema Inferno: Celluloid Explosions from the Cultural Margins. Scarecrow Press. ISBN 978-0-8108-7656-9.
- Wells, Paul (2000). The Horror Genre: From Beelzebub to Blair Witch. Wallflower Press. ISBN 978-1-903364-00-0.
- Wilkinson, Simon A. (2008). Hollywood Horror from the Director's Chair: Six Filmmakers in the Franchise of Fear. McFarland & Company. ISBN 978-0-7864-3232-5.
- Williams, Tony (1996). Hearths of Darkness: The Family in the American Horror Film. Associated University Presse. ISBN 978-0-8386-3564-3.
- Williamson, Milly (2005). The Lure Of The Vampire: Gender, Fiction And Fandom From Bram Stoker To Buffy. Wallflower Press. ISBN 978-1-904764-40-3.
- Willis, Donald C. (1 April 1972). Horror and science fiction films: a checklist. Scarecrow Press. ISBN 978-0-8108-0508-8.
- Wolf, Leonard (1989). Horror: A Connoisseur's Guide to Literature and Film. Facts On File. ISBN 978-0-8160-2197-0.
