= Adrian Harrington =

British bookseller

Adrian Harrington (born 1948, Chelsea, England) is an antiquarian bookseller, a past president of the Antiquarian Booksellers Association (ABA), 2001–2003, and a recent past president of the International League of Antiquarian Booksellers (ILAB). He has exhibited at major international book fairs in America, Canada, Hong Kong, Britain and Ireland, and between 2000 and 2010 Harrington was the chairman of Britain's leading rare book event, the summer ABA Book Fair at Olympia, London. During his tenure, it was host to opening speakers including authors Jacqueline Wilson, Lynda La Plante, Joanna Lumley, Bob Geldof, Jeremy Paxman, Andrew Marr, Barry Humphries, Frederick Forsyth and former Poet Laureate Sir Andrew Motion. Harrington has been a regular consultant on rare books for Millers Price Guide, and has been interviewed on book-related matters by the BBC, and Australian Television

== History ==
Adrian Harrington was established in the King's Road, Chelsea in 1971, moving to a location in Kensington Church Street in 1997. In 2014, he acquired the historic Hall's Bookshop in Tunbridge Wells and relocated to their premises. He deals in English Literature, first editions and general antiquarian books, and specialises in authors Winston Churchill, Arthur Conan Doyle, Graham Greene, J.K.Rowling and, particularly, Ian Fleming. Harrington's shop is managed by the bibliographer and James Bond archivist Jon Gilbert, who is a member of the Ian Fleming Foundation (IFF) and the Crime Writers' Association (CWA). During the late 1990s and 2000s Adrian Harrington held several book signing events for James Bond novelist Raymond Benson, attended by Ian Fleming's literary agent Peter Janson-Smith, the former chair of Glidrose Publications. Also attending were Doug Redenius, president of the Ian Fleming Foundation, and IFF directors David A. Reinhart and Dave Worrall, and biographer of Ian Fleming Andrew Lycett. The Adrian Harrington bookshop has also been used to film the 2005 literary-based comedy drama Mrs. Palfrey at the Claremont, starring Joan Plowright and Rupert Friend.

Since 2010 Adrian Harrington has been a publisher, and stockist and distributor for Queen Anne Press publications. In 2022, in partnership with Peter Harrington, Adrian Harrington acquired the significant Ian Fleming archive of manuscript collector Martin Schøyen.
