= Second Edition =

Second Edition may refer to:

- Second Edition (quartet), a barbershop quartet
- Second Edition, an alternative title for the 1979 album Metal Box by Public Image Ltd.
- Windows 98 Second Edition, an updated version of the original Windows 98
