= Jon Gilbert =

Jon Gilbert (born 1972) is an English bibliophile, historian and the official bibliographer of Ian Fleming, creator of the fictional character James Bond. He is also an authority on J. K. Rowling first editions, and a member of the Crime Writers' Association (CWA).

He was educated at Caterham School and Roehampton Institute London. According to Fleming-family publisher Queen Anne Press, Gilbert is perhaps the foremost expert on the works of Ian Fleming and the literary history of James Bond. Through Adrian Harrington booksellers, he has become an internationally renowned dealer in rare Fleming material, and acts as a consultant to the US registered charity, The Ian Fleming Foundation. Ian Fleming: The Bibliography, which was published in October 2012, is the result of both a career immersed in the writings of Ian Fleming, and four years intensive research following Fleming’s centenary year in 2008. The book was the winner of the 16th ILAB Breslauer Prize for Bibliography, awarded in 2014.

Gilbert has appeared on radio and television discussing his subject, and in various Bond-related publications including 007 Magazine, Kiss Kiss Bang Bang and MI6 Confidential. In May 2017, Gilbert gave the lecture Ian Fleming: The Author as Collector at the University of London. In July 2021, Gilbert moderated the specialist webinar 007: The Transatlantic Appeal of James Bond.

In 2022, acting for Adrian Harrington together with bookseller Peter Harrington, Gilbert acquired the significant Ian Fleming archive of manuscript collector Martin Schøyen, for which he had written the catalogue (2020). While assessing the material with biographer Andrew Lycett he uncovered Ian Fleming's forgotten 1956 screenplay for Moonraker, imagining James Bond for the big screen, being the novelist's only attempt at a film script.

== Works ==
- Painted Decoration in Bookbinding (within The New Bookbinder Annual, 1997)
- Ian Fleming: The Bibliography (Queen Anne Press, 2012) ISBN 978-0-9558189-6-7 [Regular Edition]
- Ian Fleming: The Bibliography (Queen Anne Press, 2012) ISBN 978-0-9558189-7-4 [Special Edition]
- Ian Fleming. A Catalogue (Adrian Harrington Limited, 2013) [Limited hardcover]
- Ian Fleming. A Catalogue (Adrian Harrington Limited, 2013) ISBN 978-0-9576041-0-0 [paperback]
- Onverwachte Miniaturen [translated by Marlene Hoogeven] (in Handboekbinden, the journal of The Dutch Bookbinders Society, Spring 2014)
- Collecting Ian Fleming (within The Book Collector Special Number, Spring 2017)
- Collecting Ian Fleming (Queen Anne Press, June 2017) [Letterpress Printing, Separate Edition]
- Ian Fleming: The Book Collector edited by James Ferguson (Queen Anne Press, 2017, contains Collecting Ian Fleming) [Limited hardcover]
- Ian Fleming: The Bibliography (Queen Anne Press, 2017) ISBN 978-0-9558189-6-7 [New Edition]
- [book review] Ian Fleming: The Notes by John Pearson (author) (within The Book Collector vol.69, no.3, Autumn 2020)
- The Schoyen Collection: Ian Fleming & James Bond (Adrian Harrington Limited, 2020) ISBN 978-0-9576041-1-7
- A Bibliography of Biographies of Ian Fleming (within The Book Collector vol.72, no.4, Winter 2023)
- Journey of A Bibliography (monograph series, Privately Printed, 2024)
- Notes on The Notes (monograph series, Privately Printed, 2025)
- Genesis of GEN11. The Writing of Chitty-Chitty-Bang-Bang (monograph series, Privately Printed, 2026)
