= First Edition (Australian news TV program) =

Australian breakfast news television show (1993-96)

First Edition, sometimes written as 1st Edition, is an Australian breakfast television news program broadcast by the ABC from 1993 to 1996.

It was first launched in February 1993 and featured Doug Weller and Kate Dunstan as hosts. It was withdrawn in May "for refinement" with it being reported that it was suspended until further notice. It returned in September with host Tony Eastley and was changed from an hour long show to 30 minutes. Eastley left the show in May 1995. Kathy Bowlen became the host and was there until the show was axed in August 1996.
