= Moonraker =

Moonraker may refer to:

- Moonrakers, a colloquialism for people from Wiltshire, England

== James Bond media franchise ==
- Moonraker (novel), a 1955 James Bond novel by Ian Fleming
- Moonraker (film), a 1979 film based on the novel
- Moonraker (soundtrack), a soundtrack album from the film
- James Bond and Moonraker, a novelization of the 1979 film by Christopher Wood

== Other arts and media ==
- Moonraker (comics), a fictional character in the Marvel Comics universe
- Moonraker, a 1927 novel by F. Tennyson Jesse
- The Moonraker, a 1952 play by Arthur Watkyn
- The Moonraker, a 1958 British film based on the play
- The Moonraker Mutiny, a 1972 novel by Antony Trew
- The Curse of Moonraker, a 1977 novel by Eth Clifford
- Moonraker, a band featuring Mike Patton

== Transport ==
- Moonraker (sail), the uppermost course of sail on a fully rigged ship
- Moonraker, two superyachts with the same (original) owner Gautam Singhania, a Norship in 1992 and an Overmarine in 2014
- MOONRAKER, the callsign for charter airline Hi Fly Malta
- Moonraker (lunar orbiter), a space mission of the European Space Agency (ESA)
