= Book trade in the United Kingdom =

People and business in the trade of books in Britain

The book trade in the United Kingdom has its roots as far back as the 14th century; however the emergence of internet booksellers such as Amazon partnered with the introduction of the e-Book has drastically altered the scope of the industry. Book retailers such as Borders have failed to adjust to these changes, thus there has been a steep decline in the number of operating traditional and independent bookshops. However, still heavily influential on the trade globally, British publishers such as Penguin Books and Pearson remain dominant players within the industry and continue to publish titles globally. Numerous firms distributing books towards consumers, such as WHSmith, Oxford University Press and HarperCollins have also held considerable influence in the area.

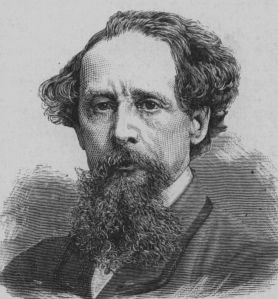
Charles Dickens: Project Gutenberg

== History ==
By the 14th century a commercial book trade had been established in the UK, and before printing was introduced to Europe by Johannes Gutenberg in 1439 production was by scribes who wrote manuscripts. By the early 15th century the majority of those engaged in these activities were situated in London and belonged to a trade guild called the Company of Stationers. By the 16th century publishers and printers controlled the book trade and introduced a commercial aspect, relying for much of their income on the sales of popular religious books, almanacs, prognostications and similar literature.

By the 20th century, as literacy became increasingly universal within society and disposable income increased, publishers were faced with new challenges. The introduction and demise of the Net Book Agreement heavily impacted the publishing industry. First established in 1900, the Act involved an agreement between booksellers and publishers to fix the price of books in order to "help maintain a chain of stock holding bookshops while giving the publishers sufficient confidence to publish new titles"

== 21st century ==
The structure of the industry within the UK has altered significantly over the last few decades, which now establishes itself as part of wider industry globally dominated by international giants such a Pearson (UK), Muse Corporation (United States), and Hachette (France). The gap between small independent booksellers and giant chain sellers has vastly increased, leading to the dissolution of many medium-sized companies; "Overall the number of significant companies has dropped by ten percent in the last decade". Technology has extensively affected developments within the publishing industry. Due to having one of the highest levels of internet connectivity in Europe, the industry in the UK experiences the prevalent threat and the vast opportunity of revolutionary technological advances such as the e-book and Amazon; almost all book publishers in the UK now utilise the standard book number.

Bookshops have begun to decline over the years, with 73 closures in 2012, the UK lost 7% of its remaining independent book stores. The number of independent book shops has now fallen below 1,000 (2014) whilst even bigger booksellers such as Borders went into liquidation.

In 2013 the publishing contributed to the UK creative economy with 231,000 jobs that had an almost equal split between men and women.

From 2014, brick and mortar shops have been performing better, seeing a light at the end of the Recession period and the boom of the Kindle. Looking at the data provided, Richard Mollet, chief executive of The Publishers Association, explains that "those who ever tried to maintain that this was a binary choice have been shown to have been posing the question in the wrong way. It is not a question of either physical or digital winning out, but rather of the sector coalescing around a balanced marketplace where all formats have place. While publishing has been efficient and effective in its adaptation, the underlying driver of the evolution is of course the reader. What the 21st-century consumer desires above all is choice. As long as publishers can give readers the option of paper or screen, the market will - and is - taking care of itself. The ebook is no more a challenge to the lifespan of paper than television is to the theatre".

UK publishers of online, publicly accessible open access books include Open Book Publishers, Ubiquity Press, and UCL Press.

== Fairs ==
- Edinburgh International Book Festival

== In popular culture ==
- 84 Charing Cross Road (film), 1987
- Notting Hill (film), 1999
- Black Books TV programme, 2000-2004

== See also ==
- Bookselling
- List of bookstore chains § United Kingdom
- Concentrations of booksellers:
  - Charing Cross Road, London
  - Broad Street, Oxford
  - Wigtown, Scotland
  - Hay-on-Wye, Wales
- List of largest book publishers of the United Kingdom
- Books in the United Kingdom

== Bibliography ==
- Howard W. Winger (1956). "Regulations Relating to the Book Trade in London from 1357 to 1586". Library Quarterly.
- Marjorie Plant. The English Booktrade: An Economic History of the Making and Sale of Books (London, 1965)
- Don-John Dugas (2001). "The London Book Trade in 1709". Papers of the Bibliographical Society of America. JSTOR 24304513.
- James Raven (2007). Business of Books: Booksellers and the English Book Trade 1450-1850. ISBN 978-0300181630.
- John Hinks (2013). "The Book Trade in Early Modern Britain: Centres, Peripheries and Networks". In Benito Rial Costas (ed.). Print Culture and Peripheries in Early Modern Europe: A Contribution to the History of Printing and the Book Trade in Small European and Spanish Cities. Brill. ISBN 9789004235748.
- William Noblett (2014). "Samuel Paterson and the London Auction Market for Second-Hand Books, 1755–1802". Papers of the Bibliographical Society of America. 108.

== Images ==
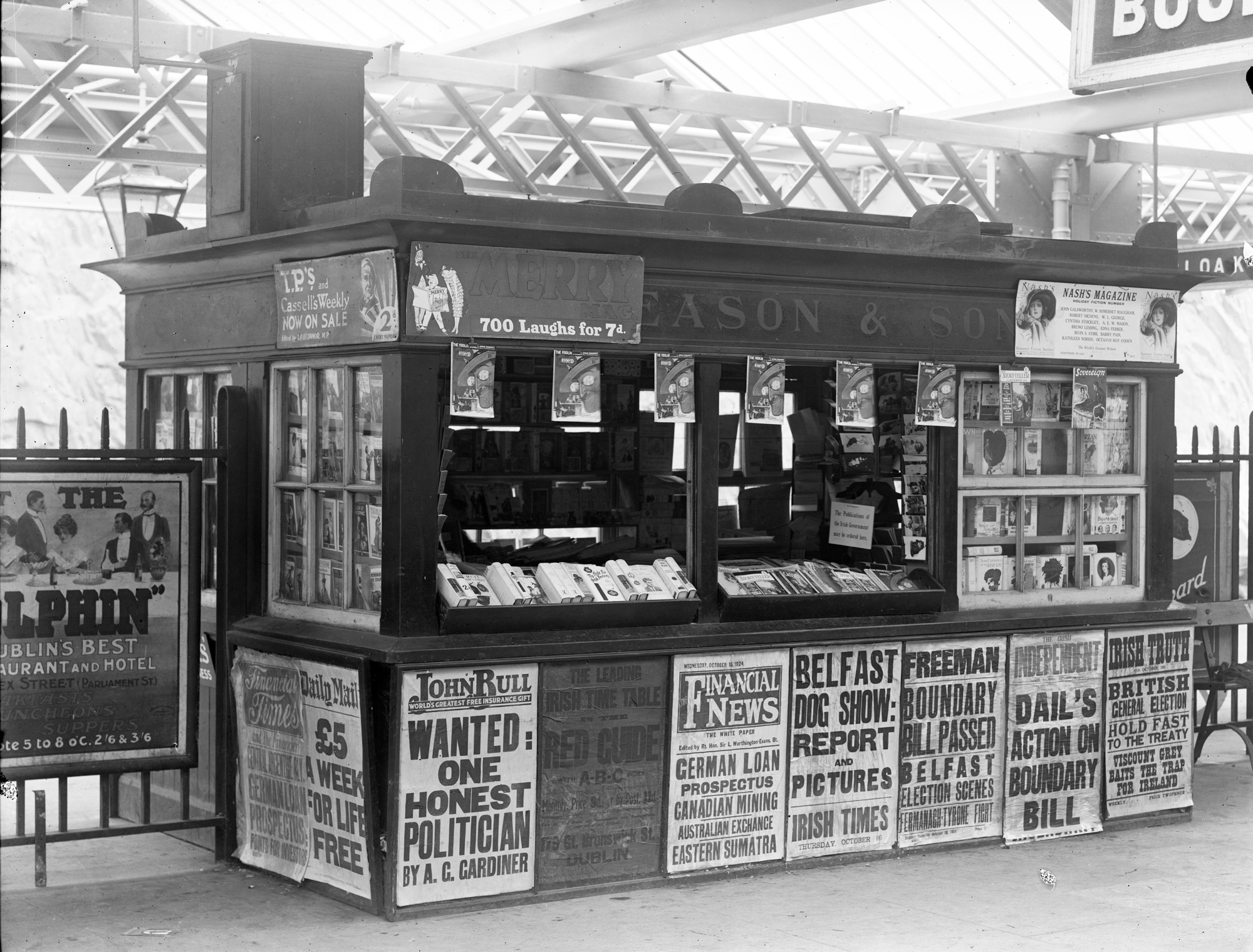
Eason's Book Stall at Waterford Train Station, 1924

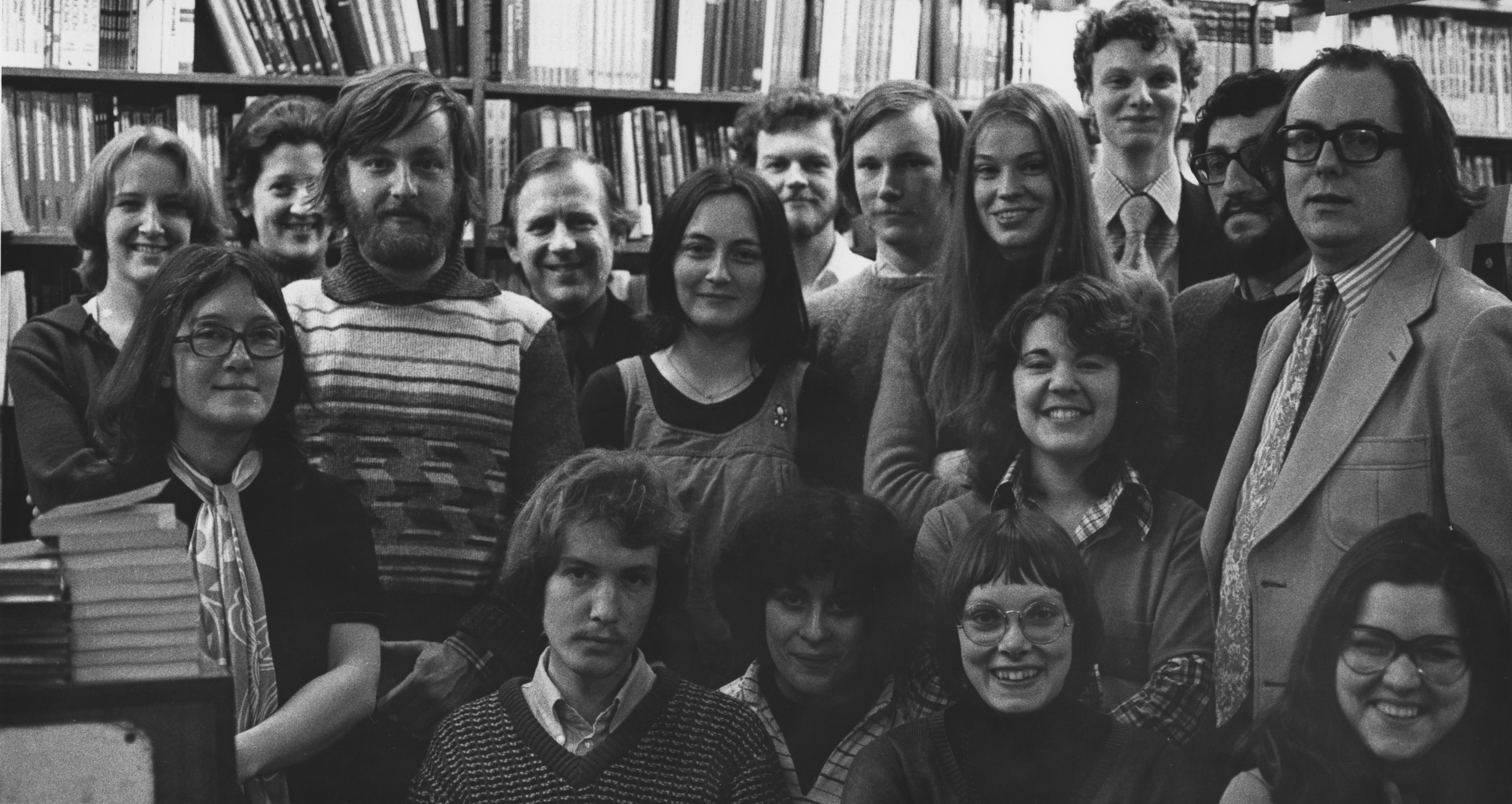
Staff of the Economists Bookshop, London, 1976

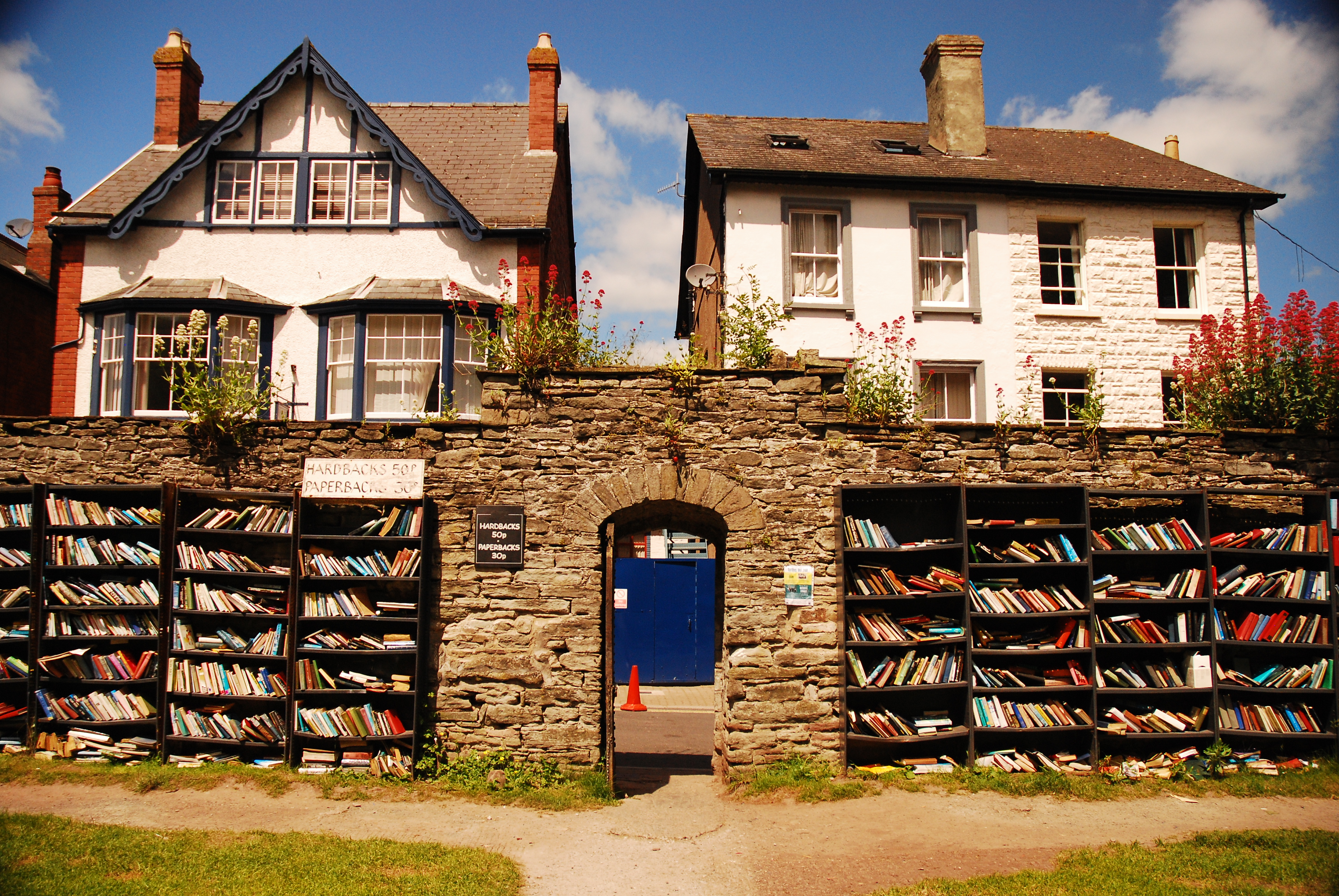
Honest Bookshop in Hay on Wye, Wales, 2008

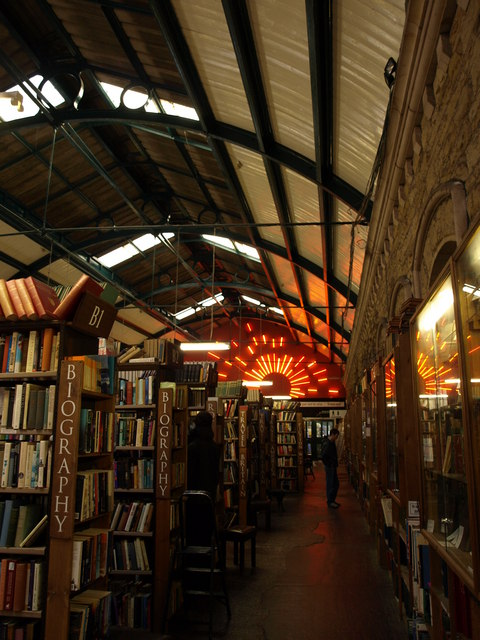
Barter Books, Alnwick, 2008
