= List of booksellers' associations =

This is a list of booksellers' associations, trade associations of independent (not chain stores) booksellers and bookstores. The list includes antiquarian booksellers associations.

== Booksellers' associations ==
=== International ===
- European and International Booksellers Federation
- Independent Online Booksellers Association
- New England Independent Booksellers Association

=== Africa ===
- Pan African Booksellers Association, focused on access to books throughout Africa by assisting national booksellers organizations in Africa

=== Australia ===
- Australian Booksellers Association

=== Europe ===
==== British Isles ====
- Booksellers Association of the UK and Ireland

==== Germany ====
- German Publishers and Booksellers Association

==== Finland ====
- Booksellers’ Association of Finland

==== Norway ====
- Norwegian Booksellers Association

Spain

- Confederación Española de Gremios y Asociaciones de Libreros

=== North America ===
==== Canada ====
- Canadian Booksellers Association

==== United States ====
- American Booksellers Association, founded in 1900, the trade association for independent booksellers
  - American Booksellers Foundation for Free Expression, subsidiary organization
- Association of Booksellers for Children
- Christian Booksellers Association
- Independent Mystery Booksellers Association

== Antiquarian booksellers' associations ==
=== International ===
- International League of Antiquarian Booksellers

=== Asia ===
==== Japan ====
- Antiquarian Booksellers Association of Japan

==== Korea ====
- Antiquarian Booksellers Association of Korea, founded in 1989 and joined the International League of Antiquarian Booksellers in 1990

=== Australia ===
- Australian and New Zealand Association of Antiquarian Booksellers

=== Europe ===
==== Austria ====
- Antiquarian Booksellers Association of Austria

==== Denmark ====
- Danish Antiquarian Booksellers Association

==== Belgium ====
- Belgian Antiquarian Booksellers Association

==== France ====
- Syndicat National de la Librairie Ancienne et Moderne

==== Italy ====
- Associazione Librai Antiquari d'Italia

==== Netherlands ====
- Nederlandsche Vereeniging van Antiquaren

==== Switzerland ====
- Vereinigung der Buchantiquare und Kupferstichhändler in der Schweiz

==== United Kingdom ====
- Antiquarian Booksellers Association

=== North America ===
==== United States ====
- Antiquarian Booksellers' Association of America
- Cascade Booksellers Association
- Florida Antiquarian Booksellers' Association
- Great Lakes Independent Booksellers Association
- Midwest Antiquarian Booksellers Association
- Rocky Mountain Antiquarian Booksellers Association
- Southern New England Antiquarian Booksellers
