= A Long Fatal Love Chase =

1995 novel by Louisa May Alcott

- Cover, Random House edition, 1995
- Author: Louisa May Alcott (Kent Bicknell, editor)
- Cover artist: J.K. Lambert
- Language: English
- Genre: Gothic novel; thriller novel
- Publisher: Random House
- Publication date: 1995
- Publication place: United States
- Media type: Print (Hardcover)
- Pages: 242 pp
- ISBN: 0-679-44510-2
- OCLC: 32166212
- Dewey Decimal: 813/.4 20
- LC Class: PS1017 .L66 1995

A Long Fatal Love Chase is an 1866 novel by Louisa May Alcott published posthumously in 1995. Two years before the publication of Little Women, Alcott uncharacteristically experimented with the style of the thriller and submitted the result, A Long Fatal Love Chase, to her publisher. The manuscript was rejected, and it remained unpublished before being bought, restored and published to acclaim in 1995.

== Publication history ==
In 1866, Louisa May Alcott toured Europe for the first time; being poor, she traveled as the paid companion of an invalid. Upon her return, she found her family in financial straits; subsequently, when publisher James R. Elliot asked her to write another novel suitable for serialisation in the magazine The Flag of Our Union (later mockingly referred to as "The Weekly Volcano" in Little Women), Alcott dashed off a 292-page Gothic romance entitled A Modern Mephistopheles, or The Fatal Love Chase as a potboiler. She gave the novel a European setting and incorporated many of her still-fresh travel experiences and observations, but Elliot rejected it for being "too long & too sensational!", whereupon she changed the title to Fair Rosamond and undertook extensive revisions to shorten the novel and tone down its more controversial elements. Despite these changes, the book was again rejected, and Alcott laid the manuscript aside.

Fair Rosamond ended up in Harvard's Houghton Library. The earlier draft was auctioned off by Alcott's heirs and eventually fell into the hands of a Manhattan rare book dealer. In 1994, Kent Bicknell, headmaster of the Sant Bani School in Sanbornton, New Hampshire, paid "more than his annual salary but less than $50,000" for the unexpurgated version of the manuscript. After restoring it, he sold the publication rights to Random House, receiving a $1.5 million advance. Bicknell donated 25% of the profits to Orchard House (the museum of the Alcott Family), 25% to the Alcott heirs, and 25% to the Sant Bani School.

In 1995, Random House released the novel in a hardbound edition under the title A Long Fatal Love Chase. It became a best-seller, and an audiobook version soon followed. The novel is still in print (September 2007) as a trade paperback from Dell Books.

== Plot summary ==
Rosamond Vivian, a discontented maiden who lives on an English island with only her bitter old grandfather for company, begins the novel by rashly declaring: "I often feel as if I'd gladly sell my soul to Satan for a year of freedom." Right on cue, a man named Phillip Tempest, a libertine who intentionally bears a more than trivial resemblance to Mephistopheles, makes contact with Rosamond. Within a month, Rosamond is in love with him, and although she realizes that this man is "no saint", she marries him, believing with the fatuousness of youth that her love will save him. She sails away from her lonely island in Tempest's yacht, the Circe, and begins her married life at a luxurious villa in Nice.

Much to his own surprise, Tempest, an otherwise cold and heartless man, finds that he is content with the relationship. He tries to make Rosamond happy, and succeeds for a while; however, after a year in his company, she realizes how conscienceless and cruel he is, and discovers that Tempest has a wife and son already, making their marriage a sham and Rosamond the unwitting mistress of a man who has grossly deceived her. On the same night, she packs up, stealthily climbs down from her second-floor balcony, and catches the next train to Paris. Tempest aggressively pursues and stalks her, beginning the obsessive "chase" of the title.

Tempest continues to hunt and torment Rosamond, repeatedly signalling to her that he enjoys the pursuit and pressuring her to return to him. To attempt to avoid him, she assumes a variety of disguises: in Paris, she is a seamstress named "Ruth"; next, she escapes to a convent, where she is known as "Sister Agatha"; after that, under the name "Rosalie Varian", she travels to Germany as a nameless companion to a wealthy little girl.

Each time, as she begins to settle comfortably into a new life, Tempest reappears and attempts to recommence the relationship, which has become far more perilous than before. Under this treatment, Rosamond learns to hate and fear her former lover. At the same time, a hopeless passion develops between Rosamond and Father Ignatius, a handsome, virtuous, high-born man who happens, unfortunately, to be a Roman Catholic priest. The chase finally, and tragically, ends on the night Ignatius attempts to help Rosamond return to her grandfather's island.

== Critical reception ==
Although Alcott wrote the novel hastily while under considerable economic pressure and submitted it under the name “A. M. Barnard” — a pseudonym she used for several other Gothic thrillers — Love Chase received good mainstream reviews in 1995, 129 years after its intended appearance as an ephemeral potboiler.

Most contemporary critics choose to emphasize the strong feminist elements, fast-moving story, curiously contemporary “stalker” theme, and — most of all — the conspicuous lack of domesticity (in contrast with Little Women). The Booklist reviewer declares “Alcott's melodramatic but intriguing tale dramatises the tragic plight of women in her oppressive times“, while Katherine Powers of Forbes, exclaiming over the novel's unexpectedly exuberant violation of norms, recommends the audiobook version as “a real Gothic potboiler by a slumming Louisa May Alcott”. Phoebe-Lou Adams of the Atlantic Monthly, wondering why such an exciting and adjective-rich narrative was originally rejected, speculates “Could the objection have been simply that the heroine, on discovering that she has been duped into a false marriage with a murderer, fails to collapse and die of shame? Instead she scoops up the available jewels, flees by night through a window, and repudiates any guilt in the affair. Perfectly sensible of her–but perhaps not what readers of Victorian light literature were prepared to approve.”

== Scholarly importance ==
Alcott's pseudonymous career as A. M. Barnard, successful writer of sensational fiction, was brought to light in the early 1940s by a rare book dealer, Madeleine B. Stern, and a librarian, Leona Rostenberg. Their discovery became widely known in 1975, when Stern dusted off some of the more interesting stories for Behind a Mask: The Unknown Thrillers of Louisa May Alcott. Since then, several more such collections have been published, providing intriguing new material for literary scholars and biographers eager to reevaluate Alcott's career. The strongly feminist Love Chase seems likely to become a valued resource in this field of inquiry, with the added cachet that it was once judged too sensational for publication. In the words of reviewer Andria Spencer, “What proves so fascinating about Saxton's biography [a 1977 Alcott biography, reissued in 1996], A Long Fatal Love Chase, and ... Behind a Mask is the reversal made in addressing Alcott's life and work — the solid, upright pedagogue melts away before the image of the ardent suffragette, sole support of family and home and rebel, despite herself.”

== See also ==
- Little Women
- Jane Eyre. Alcott often borrowed plot elements from Charlotte Brontë.
- Faust, Clarissa, and The Tempest are also important thematic sources.
