= Vereinigung der Buchantiquare und Kupferstichhändler in der Schweiz =

Vereinigung der Buchantiquare und Kupferstichhändler in der Schweiz (VEBUKU), the antiquarian booksellers association of Switzerland, was founded in 1939 and has been a member of the International League of Antiquarian Booksellers (ILAB) since 1947.

The VEBUKU unites people dealing in old and modern prints and drawings, old and rare books, periodicals, manuscripts and autographs. Its aim is to protect and encourage a fair trade based on the experience and cultural responsibility of its members.

The annual and sole antiquarian bookfair in Switzerland (Antiquariats-Messe Zürich) is loyally supported by the VEBUKU.

== See also ==
- International League of Antiquarian Booksellers
- Australian and New Zealand Association of Antiquarian Booksellers
- Antiquarian Booksellers Association of Austria
- Antiquarian Booksellers Association
- Syndicat National de la Librairie Ancienne et Moderne (SLAM)
- Antiquarian Booksellers' Association of America
- Antiquarian Booksellers Association of Canada
- Danish Antiquarian Booksellers Association
- Belgian Antiquarian Booksellers Association
- Antiquarian Booksellers Association of Japan
- Antiquarian Booksellers Association of Korea
- Nederlandsche Vereeniging van Antiquaren
