= Antiquarian Booksellers Association of Austria =

The Antiquarian Booksellers Association of Austria, formed in 1949, includes those Austrian antiquarian booksellers who exclusively or primarily buy and sell antiquarian books, magazines, prints, autograph letters or music.

The members of the association submit themselves to the Austrian version of the "Rules, Customs and Usages" of the International League of Antiquarian Booksellers to which the Austrian Association is affiliated. The ILAB code of ethics defines how commercial transactions are to be conducted between Austrian and foreign antiquarian booksellers and also between professionals and individuals.

The Antiquarian Booksellers' Association of Austria has hosted the biennial ILAB congress three times, the last in 1998. The association has also hosted the annual President's Meeting several times.

== Membership ==
There are currently 37 members of the Antiquarian Booksellers' Association of Austria. The committee consists of five people; elections for the committee are held every three years.

Since its foundation in 1949 the association has had the following presidents:

- 1949 - 1962 Prof. Christian M. NEBEHAY(†)
- 1962 - 1970 Ingo NEBEHAY (†)
- 1970 - 1976 Michael KRIEG (†)
- 1976 - 1985 Dkfm. Werner TAEUBER (†)
- 1985 - 2000 Dr. Hansjörg KRUG
- 2000 - 2003 Hans-Dieter PAULUSCH (†)
- since 2003 Norbert DONHOFER

== See also ==
- International League of Antiquarian Booksellers
- Antiquarian Booksellers' Association of America
- Australian and New Zealand Association of Antiquarian Booksellers
- Belgian Antiquarian Booksellers Association
- Antiquarian Booksellers Association (British Isles)
- Antiquarian Booksellers Association of Canada
- Danish Antiquarian Booksellers Association
- Syndicat National de la Librairie Ancienne et Moderne (SLAM) (France)
- Antiquarian Booksellers Association of Japan
- Antiquarian Booksellers Association of Korea
- Nederlandsche Vereeniging van Antiquaren
- Vereinigung der Buchantiquare und Kupferstichhändler in der Schweiz
