= Belgian Antiquarian Booksellers Association =

La Chambre Professionelle Belge de la Librairie Ancienne et Moderne (CLAM)/Belgische Beroepskamer van Antiquaren (BBA) (Belgian Antiquarian Booksellers Association), is the Belgian professional chamber of antiquarian booksellers.

Founded in 1946 and member of the International League of Antiquarian Booksellers, CLAM-BBA has 40 members from Antwerp, Bruges, Brussels, Ghent, Liège, Louvain, Mechelen and Namur and foreign associated members from France and the United States. Members are specialized in buying and selling precious books, prints, autographs, ancient and modern manuscripts. All members are bound by the ILAB code of ethics.

CLAM-BBA is also a member of UBEMA (Union Belgo-Luxembourgeoise du MarchÈ de l'Art) which unites most of the professional associations of art dealers and related businesses in Belgium and Luxembourg, offering a platform to defend their common interests.

== See also ==
- International League of Antiquarian Booksellers
- Australian and New Zealand Association of Antiquarian Booksellers
- Antiquarian Booksellers Association of Austria
- Antiquarian Booksellers Association
- Syndicat National de la Librairie Ancienne et Moderne (SLAM)
- Antiquarian Booksellers' Association of America
- Antiquarian Booksellers Association of Canada
- Danish Antiquarian Booksellers Association
- Antiquarian Booksellers Association of Japan
- Antiquarian Booksellers Association of Korea
- Nederlandsche Vereeniging van Antiquaren
- Vereinigung der Buchantiquare und Kupferstichhändler in der Schweiz
