= Antiquarian Booksellers Association of Korea =

The Antiquarian Booksellers Association of Korea (ABAK), the national antiquarian book association of Korea, was founded in 1989 and joined the International League of Antiquarian Booksellers in 1990 during the Tokyo Congress, thus becoming its 18th member.

ABAK members adhere to the ILAB rules and regulations as well as its code of ethics. They aim to promote interest and friendship among members.

The ABAK organises a yearly antiquarian bookfair in Seoul. The market consists mainly of Korean early books and manuscripts.

The ABAK has at present 31 members.

== See also ==
- International League of Antiquarian Booksellers
- Australian and New Zealand Association of Antiquarian Booksellers
- Antiquarian Booksellers Association of Austria
- Antiquarian Booksellers Association
- Syndicat National de la Librairie Ancienne et Moderne (SLAM)
- Antiquarian Booksellers' Association of America
- Antiquarian Booksellers Association of Canada
- Danish Antiquarian Booksellers Association
- Belgian Antiquarian Booksellers Association
- Antiquarian Booksellers Association of Japan
- Nederlandsche Vereeniging van Antiquaren
- Vereinigung der Buchantiquare und Kupferstichhändler in der Schweiz
