= Nederlandsche Vereeniging van Antiquaren =

Nederlandsche Vereeniging van Antiquaren (NVvA), the Dutch antiquarian booksellers' association, was founded in 1935 with the object of promoting reliability in the trade of old books and prints.

== History ==
Similar antiquarian book trade organisations existed in other countries. These formed themselves in 1947, with the Dutch Association as one of its promoters, into the International League of Antiquarian Booksellers (ILAB), composed of associations from 22 countries. Members of the NVvA are thus part of an international network of dealers who, thanks to their expertise and to the rules of behaviour imposed by their associations, form the best contacts for collectors of old books and prints.

== NVvA Today ==
NVvA member's guarantees of authenticity, completeness, and condition, with the right to return any goods for defects not mentioned and total repayment, are a security which no purchaser would want to do without, as each member voluntarily adheres to the ILAB code of ethics.

Members of the association are reliable and expert advisers concerning questions of insurance or inheritance, can represent would-be purchasers at auctions in their own country or abroad, and can also be of assistance in tracing books or prints considered difficult to find. Some members have a special search service, by means of which the would-be purchaser gains access to stocks spread all over the world.

== See also ==
- Books in the Netherlands
- International League of Antiquarian Booksellers
- Australian and New Zealand Association of Antiquarian Booksellers
- Antiquarian Booksellers Association of Austria
- Antiquarian Booksellers Association
- Syndicat National de la Librairie Ancienne et Moderne (SLAM)
- Antiquarian Booksellers' Association of America
- Antiquarian Booksellers Association of Canada
- Danish Antiquarian Booksellers Association
- Belgian Antiquarian Booksellers Association
- Antiquarian Booksellers Association of Japan
- Antiquarian Booksellers Association of Korea
- Vereinigung der Buchantiquare und Kupferstichhändler in der Schweiz
