= Hoepli =

Hoepli may refer to:

- Hoepli Editore, an Italian publishing company
- Ulrico Hoepli (1847–1935), Swiss-Italian publisher, founder of Hoepli Editore
- 8111 Hoepli, a main-belt asteroid named after Ulrico Hoepli
