= Hellinga =

Hellinga is a surname. Notable people with the surname include:

- Gerben Hellinga Jr (born 1938), Dutch author of science-fiction and historic novels
- Lotte Hellinga (born 1932), book historian and expert on printing
- Wytze Hellinga (1908–1985), Dutch linguist
- Wilco Hellinga (born 1970), Dutch footballer
