= International League of Antiquarian Booksellers =

Non-profit umbrella organization of bookseller associations

The International League of Antiquarian Booksellers is a non-profit international federation of bookseller associations, with its legal location in London, UK. It unites 22 national associations of Antiquarian Booksellers, representing over 1600 dealers in 39 countries. Antiquarian booksellers affiliated to the League adhere to the ILAB Code of Usages and Customs, and the League aims to serve as a global network for the rare book trade.

== History ==
The idea of forming an international organization of antiquarian booksellers that would beneficially link national associations of antiquarian booksellers was originally conceived by the former president of the Dutch Association, Menno Hertzberger. As a Jew, he had spent part of the Second World War hiding from the Nazis. To quote him:

"Five long years (of war) had put up … barriers between nations. There was no communication. This enforced extra chauvinism - worse, hatred. Was there a possibility to do something about inter-human relationships, to bring nations more together? This was my dream. But how could it be realized? Only on common ground, on mutual interests. Therefore, for an antiquarian bookseller, by THE BOOK!"

In 1947, representatives from five countries, Denmark, France, Great Britain, the Netherlands and Sweden, met in Amsterdam to discuss the formation of such an organization, with the aim of establishing open markets, to foster friendship and understanding, and to counteract the animosity and suspicion engendered by World War Two.

The president of the British Association, Percy H. Muir, chaired the first conference and became a major role player in the evolution of the League; Muir also assembled the important scientific library of Ian Fleming, later author of the James Bond novels - through Muir, Fleming himself became a director of the London booksellers Elkin Mathews.

ILAB was formally incorporated in Copenhagen in September 1948, with ten participating countries, among them Belgium, Finland, Switzerland, Norway, Italy, Great Britain, France, Sweden, the Netherlands and Denmark. William S. Kundig from Switzerland was elected the first ILAB President in the history of the League. In his opening speech the Danish bookseller Einar Grønholt Pedersen defined the universal aims and ethics of all ILAB antiquarian booksellers:

The commodity we handle - the book - is, I daresay, about the most international thing on the world market. It is the support of the research worker and the scientist, the indispensable tool of the intellectual worker thirsting for knowledge. It satisfies the desires of all thinking and sensitive individuals. It is the inspiration behind new ideas, new deeds - and last, but not least, it fulfils a great mission in enlightening the masses. Our mission is to find the right book, preserve and finally convey it to wherever it is needed and can bring benefit or pleasure. A mission which, by its very nature, imposes upon us a responsibility which we must not neglect.

=== Present status ===
22 national associations and over 1600 rare booksellers in 39 countries under one roof: Members of the International League of Antiquarian Booksellers are the national associations, their members are affiliated to the League, and known as ILAB booksellers or ILAB affiliates.

ILAB Congresses and ILAB Book Fairs are important marketplaces of the rare book world.

The ILAB Breslauer Prize for Bibliography is awarded every fourth year to outstanding academic works on bibliography and the history of the book. The ILAB Missing Books Register aims to prevent book thefts worldwide.

The ILAB website is regularly updated with information on booksellers, the rare book market, international rare book fairs and events and holds a comprehensive search function for material for sale by ILAB booksellers: www.ilab.org

== Code of Customs and Usages ==
The League publishes, and upholds, a Code of Customs and Usages based on the wide experience of all its member nations. ILAB affiliated booksellers are expected to follow this code.

The display of the ILAB logo, and those of national associations, pledges to maintain authenticity of all material offered for sale, correct description of all such material, disclosure of all significant defects or restorations, accurate and professional pricing of all material, clear marking of all prices and care in the conduct of appraisals or valuations.

== ILAB Breslauer Prize for Bibliography ==
The ILAB Breslauer Prize for Bibliography was first awarded in 1964. The Prize of $10,000 is awarded every fourth year to the author(s) of the most original and outstanding 'book about a book' in the broad field of bibliography worldwide. Any aspect of bibliography (e.g. enumerative, textual, history of the book, design, binding, book trade, etc.) is admitted. Certain categories are not eligible, notably manuscripts, catalogues of books intended for sale and translations of works appearing in another language. Apart from the Prize, the jurors may at their discretion award Honourable Mentions to other deserving entries.

The purpose of the Prize is to draw attention to what it regards as the best academic work being done in the field, to reward and honour it in appropriate terms, and to publicise the League's support for original scholarship.

The panel of judges (or jurors) consists of three professional scholars or librarians and three antiquarian booksellers. They are chosen with an aim to represent the widest possible range of nationalities so that the panel is qualified to adjudicate on books in various languages and on all aspects of bibliography and the history of the book.

Georges A. Deny (of Brussels) was appointed as the first Secretary of the ILAB Prize for Bibliography. He laid down the ground rules and supervised the first and second Awards. He was succeeded by Dr. Frieder Kocher-Benzing (of Stuttgart) who was the longest serving Secretary presiding over the third to eleventh Prize, then by Konrad Meuschel (Germany), Raymond Kilgarriff (Great Britain), and Mitsuo Nitta (Japan).

In 2008, the name of the Prize was changed into ILAB Breslauer Prize for Bibliography to honour a generous gift granted by the Breslauer Foundation which was set up by Dr. Bernard H. Breslauer (1918–2004), an ILAB dealer who had a lifelong passion for bibliography. The first ILAB Prize for Bibliography was awarded in 1967 to Jean Peeters-Fontainas, followed by famous scholars like Claus Nissen, Wytze Hellinga, I. C. Koeman, Francois Weil, Gerhard Dünnhaupt, Anthony Hobson, and Lucas Heinrich Wüthrich.

The 15th ILAB Breslauer Prize was awarded in 2010 to Lotte Hellinga and Jan Storm van Leeuwen for the Catalogue of Books printed in the XVth Century now in the British Library, BMC. Part XI – England (Hes & De Graaf Publishers BV, 2007) and Dutch Decorated Bookbinding in the Eighteenth Century (Hes & De Graaf Publishers BV, 2006). The 16th Prize was awarded in 2014 to Jon Gilbert for Ian Fleming: The Bibliography, being the first work on a twentieth century writer to be awarded the prize. Arnoud Gerits (The Netherlands) was the Prize Secretary. The 17th Prize was awarded to Ina Kok (The Netherlands) for her outstanding work Woodcuts in Incunabula Printed in the Low Countries. The 18th Prize was awarded to Jack Baldwin (UK) for A Catalogue of Fifteenth-Century Printed Books in Glasgow Libraries and Museums, 2 vols (Woodbridge: Boydell and Brewer, 2020).

== ILAB Congresses and International Book Fairs ==
ILAB Congresses and International Antiquarian Book Fairs are open to all antiquarian booksellers affiliated to the League through their national associations. They are cultural and social events held every two years in another country, where the delegates have the possibility to study the treasures of book printing and arts, and to deepen business contacts.

The first congresses were held in Amsterdam and Copenhagen, followed by London, Paris, Geneva, Milan, New York City, Ravenna, San Francisco, Tokyo, Los Angeles, Melbourne and many other cities. In 2022, the 44th ILAB Congress took place in Oxford, while in 2024 antiquarian booksellers and bibliophiles met in Amsterdam.

ILAB also sponsors international book fairs organised by the national associations, as for example in Paris, London, New York City, San Francisco, Melbourne, Stuttgart, Milan, Madrid, Amsterdam, Tokyo or in the Scandinavian capitals. These fairs provide members the opportunity to exhibit for sale books, prints and manuscripts.

== National associations ==
- The Australian & New Zealand Association of Antiquarian Booksellers (ANZAAB)
- Antiquarian Booksellers Association of Austria (Verband der Antiquare Österreichs), formed in 1949, includes those Austrian antiquarian booksellers who exclusively or primarily buy and sell antiquarian books, magazines, prints, autograph letters or music.
- La Chambre Professionelle Belge de la Librairie Ancienne et Moderne (CLAM)/Belgische Beroepskamer van Antiquaren (BBA)
- Associação Brasileira de Liveiros Antiquarios (ABLA), established in 1945 by Walter Geyerhahn, his brother Stefan Geyerhahn and Erich Eichner. They were proprietors of the "Livraria Editora KOSMOS", located in Rio de Janeiro since 1935. Among the dozens of important 19th century works re-edited by Livraria Kosmos and many of 20th century works edited, was the "Bibliografia Brasiliana", written by Rubem Borba de Moraes and published in association with "Editora Colibris", Amsterdam. The Brazilian Association joined the League in 1954.
- Antiquarian Booksellers' Association of Canada (ABAC)/Association de la Librairie Ancienne du Canada (ALAC)
- Antiquarian Booksellers' Association of the Czech Republic or Svaz Antikváru CR (SACR) was founded in 1992 and became affiliated to the League in 1994.
- Den Danske Antikvarboghandlerforening (ABF)
- Finnish Antiquarian Booksellers Association Suomen Antikvariaattiyhdistys (SAY), was founded in 1941. Its first and long-standing chairman was Erik Olsoni during whose presidency SAY became a member of ILAB in 1948.
- Syndicat National de la Librairie Ancienne et Moderne (SLAM)
- German Antiquarian Booksellers' Association (Verband Deutscher Antiquare, VDA) was founded in 1949. It provides customers with guarantees of adherence to the ILAB Code of Customs. The VDA organizes the Stuttgart Rare Book Fair which is held every year in January, and runs an online database for book auction records: Auktionspreise Online.
- Antiquarian Booksellers Association (ABA), United Kingdom
- Hungarian Antiquarian Booksellers' Association (Magyar Antikváriusok Egyesülete, MAE) was founded in 1992 and became an ILAB member in 2010.
- Associazione Librai Antiquari d'Italia is a founding member of the ILAB, having joined it in 1948, during the first Congress in Copenhagen.
- Antiquarian Booksellers Association of Japan (ABAJ)
- Antiquarian Booksellers Association of Korea (ABAK), founded in 1989 and joined ILAB in 1990 during the Tokyo Congress, thus becoming its 18th member.
- Nederlandsche Vereeniging van Antiquaren (NVvA), founded in 1935 with the object of promoting reliability in the trade of old books and prints
- Antiquarian Booksellers' Association of Norway or Norsk Antikvarbokhandlerforening (NABF) was established in April 1942 by Jørgen W. Cappelen of Cappelens Antikvariat. The NABF joined the League in 1948.
- Russian Antiquarian Booksellers' Association, Forum Antikvarov Bukinistov (Russia) (FAB) is a relatively young organization, and was admitted to the League as its 22nd member in 2009.
- Spanish Antiquqarian Booksellers' Association or Asociación Ibéria de Librerias Anticuarias (AILA) was founded in Barcelona in 1990 and became an ILAB member in 1993. The association organizes regular fairs in Madrid.
- Svenska Antikvariatföreningen (SVAF), the Swedish Association of Antiquarian Booksellers, was established in 1936, and belongs to the League since its beginnings.
- Vereinigung der Buchantiquare und Kupferstichhändler in der Schweiz (VEBUKU)/Syndicat de la librairie ancienne et du commerce de l'estampe en Suisse (SLACES), Switzerland
- The Antiquarian Booksellers' Association of America (ABAA) in the United States

== Bibliography ==
- Carter, John. ABC For Book Collectors.
- Kaye, Barbara (Mrs. Percy Muir). Second Impression, Rural Life with a Rare Bookman
- Mandelbrote, Giles (Editor). Out of Print And into Profit. A History of the Rare & Secondhand Book Trade in Britain in the 20th Century. New Castle, Delaware: Oak Knoll Press & The British Library, 2006
- Muir, Barbara. The Formation of the International League of Antiquarian Booksellers. Los Angeles: Antiquarian Booksellers' Association of America, 1996
- Hertzberger, Menno (editor). Dictionary for the Antiquarian Booktrade in French, English, German, Swedish, Danish, Italian, Spanish And Dutch. Paris: International League of Antiquarian Booksellers, 1956
- Franco, Edgar. Dictionary of Terms & Expressions Commonly Used in the Antiquarian Booktrade in French, English, German And Italian. N.P.: ILAB, 1994
- Maas, Nop and F. W. Kuyper (editors). Offeren Aan Mercurius En Minerva: Nederlandsche Vereeniging Van Antiquaren 1935-1995. Amsterdam: De Buitenkant, 1995
- Muir, Percy. Minding My Own Business. London: Chatto & Windus, 1956
- Gerits, Anton. Books, Friends, And Bibliophilia, Reminiscences of an Antiquarian Bookseller. New Castle: Oak Knoll Press, 2004
- Rota, Anthony. Books in the Blood. Memoirs of a Fourth Generation Bookseller. Ravelston and New Castle: Private Libraries Association and Oak Knoll Press, 2002
- Verband Deutscher Antiquare (Editor). Handbuch 2011/2012. Essays von Umberto Eco, Alberto Manguel und Jürgen Serke sowie eine Geschichte des Verbandes 1949 bis 2010. Elbingen: Verband Deutscher Antiquare, 2011.
- Marchiset, Nevine. The International League of Antiquarian Booksellers, an historical index (1947–2017). New Castle: Oak Knoll Press, 2018
