= ABAJ =

ABAJ may refer to:

- ABA Journal, monthly legal trade magazine
- Antiquarian Booksellers Association of Japan

== See also ==
- Takalik Abaj, a pre-Columbian archaeological site in Guatemala
