= Antiquarian book trade in the United States =

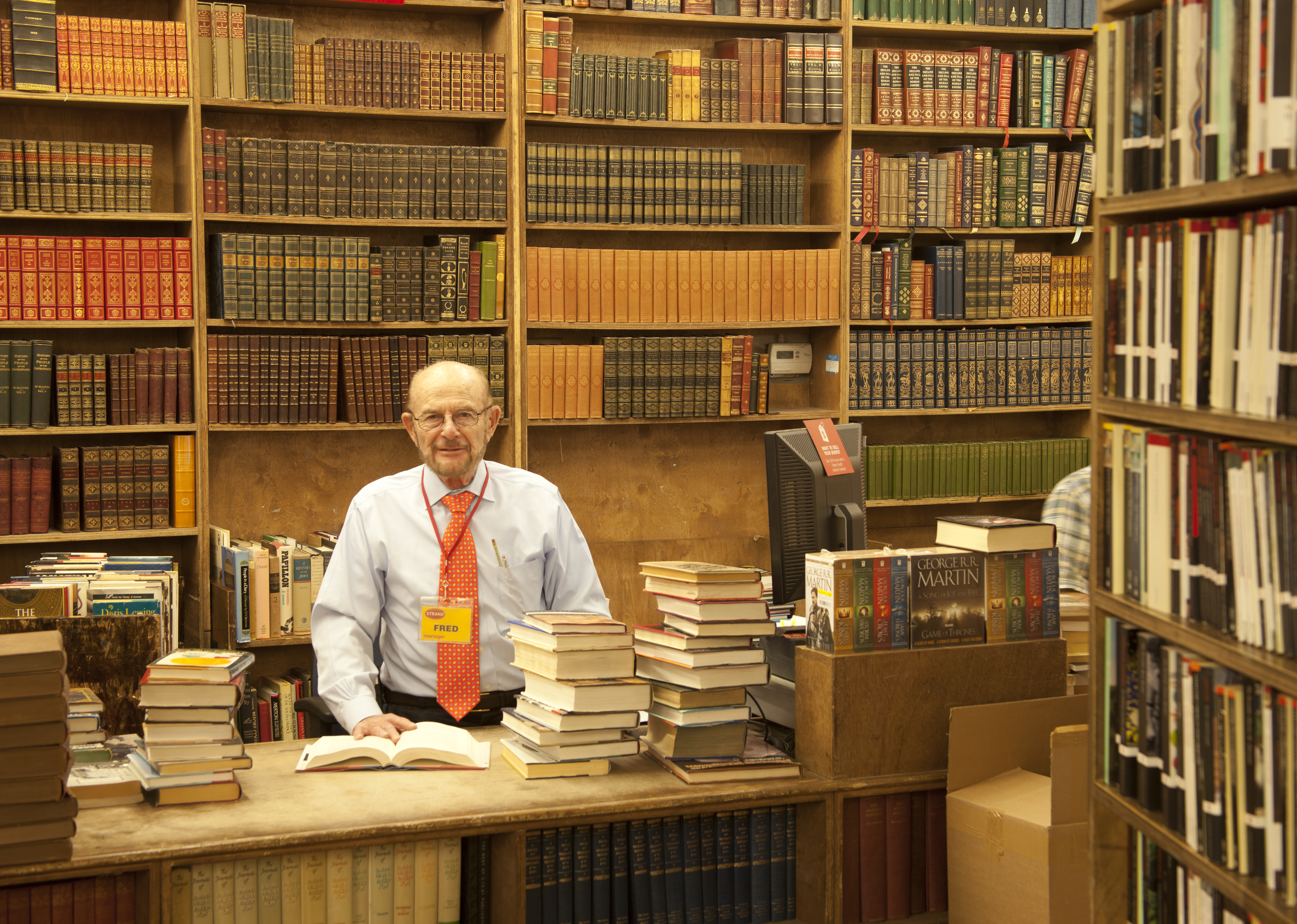
Strand Bookstore in New York.

The antiquarian book trade in the United States is an aspect of book collecting and publishing. The term antiquarian, in general, refers to antiquities and collectible items usually considered old and rare, usually in reference to books, but is not limited to books. The word antiquarian could also be used to describe a person who collects rare books or other antique items.

Two key figures who have written a great deal on the U.S. antiquarian book trade specifically are Leona Rostenberg (1908–2005) and Madeleine B. Stern (1912–2007), both of whom were also in the business of collecting and selling rare books. Other histories having covered the topic include Isaiah Thomas, writing in 1810 his History of printing in America; Henry Walcott Boynton’s Annals of American Bookselling, 1638-1850, first published in 1932; Hellmut Lehmann-Haupt’s The Book in America: A History of the Making, the Selling, and the Collecting of Books in the United States (1939).

The antiquarian book trade has roots in Colonial America, and may be considered in the study of American history and literature, print culture, and book history. Antiquarian book fairs have long been an important aspect of the trade. Today, the Antiquarian Booksellers' Association of America (ABAA) is the primary organization of the trade in the United States. Other organizations include the Society for the History of Authorship, Reading and Publishing (SHARP). The Rare Book School at the University of Virginia is the premier institution for those seeking an advanced education in the field.

== History ==
The beginnings of the antiquarian book trade can be traced to British North America, specifically Boston of the Massachusetts Bay Colony. There is no established date of when this business of book collecting actually begins, however Stern attributes the beginnings to John Dunton’s visit to Boston in 1686, in which he brought along numerous books from his native England. Printed materials and books however were already available in Boston, the first book shop having been opened in 1647 by Hezekiah Usher. The act of collecting and selling books as a form of business increases later in seventeenth century, with 1693 being the date of the earliest printed catalogue of books in the American colonies.

Events in Boston during the eighteenth century proved both difficult and advantageous for the antiquarian book trade. For example, a fire broke out in 1711 that consumed nearly every bookshop then in existence in Boston. In the next two decades antiquarian booksellers rebuilt and gradually began to thrive, with the presence of Harvard College, as well as a certain literary and educational milieu in Boston allowing the development of the antiquarian book trade.

In the later eighteenth century, the heart of the antiquarian trade shifted to Philadelphia and New York City, growing with an increasingly educated public and independence from Britain. With the movement of people westward bookselling spread, and soon, small cities like Cincinnati become known in the book trade. The trade spread to Richmond and New Orleans, then to Texas, St. Louis, Chicago, and eventually, following the gold rush, to California.

== See also ==
- Antiquarian Booksellers' Association of America
- Bibliophilia
- Incunabulum
- Bookselling in the US
- African-American bookstores
- Books in the United States
- Independent Online Booksellers Association
