= Antiquarian Booksellers' Association of America =

Booksellers trade association in the United States

- Abbreviation: ABAA
- Formation: 1949
- Type: Trade association
- Legal status: Nonprofit organization
- Purpose: Promote interest in rare books
- Headquarters: New York, NY
- Region served: United States
- Members: US antiquarian booksellers
- Affiliations: International League of Antiquarian Booksellers
- Website: abaa.org

The Antiquarian Booksellers' Association of America (ABAA) is an organization in the United States for dealers in rare and antiquarian books. The association is a member of the International League of Antiquarian Booksellers (ILAB).

== History ==
Founded in 1949, the ABAA is the benchmark for professionalism and ethics in the rare book trade in the US. The founding of the ABAA was the direct result of the founding of the International League of Antiquarian Booksellers (ILAB) a year earlier: "It was quickly recognized in the United States that national and international cooperation among booksellers was an idea whose time had come and that an American association was vital for the interests of professional booksellers." An organizational meeting was held in New York City in 1949 to discuss the advisability of forming a national organization, with about 50 dealers in attendance, with Marston Drake (James F. Drake, Inc.) acting as informal chairman. The Antiquarian Bookman (later AB Bookman's Weekly) reported in its issue of 5 March 1949 that "A great step forward towards the establishment of a genuine national association of antiquarian booksellers was taken" at this meeting, though "it was recognized that there were a great many differences, a long backlog of personal disputes and dissensions and an enormous field of individual views and prejudices" to deal with. "It was also recognized that all the above were some of the very reasons why a national association of antiquarian booksellers had to be formed: not merely to reconcile the differences but also to advance book-buying, to promote book-collecting, so that all would benefit from such increased activity in the book field." The first general meeting of the new association took place in March, with 81 dealers in attendance; annual dues were set at $10/year. The first president of the ABAA was Laurence Gomme (Brentano's).

"Book fairs are such a major element in the activities and functions of the present-day ABAA," writes Edwin Glaser (President of ABAA, 1986–88) "that it still comes as a surprise to be reminded that the first American antiquarian book fair did not take place until April of 1960." Encouraged by the success of the first British fair the previous year, the New York fair, held in the un-air-conditioned Steinway Hall on West 57th Street, featured 23 dealers occupying 20 booths. The fair opened with a 5pm preview on April 4, and ran for 12 hours/day for five more days, from 10am–10 pm; admission was free. Describing the event many years later, Madeleine B. Stern (Rostenberg & Stern) writes:

Before the fair opened, a few minutes before 5 p.m., Leona [Rostenberg] wondered out loud what we had all wondered silently: would our fair attract any visitors at all? Then, before I had realized it, she had ducked outside to see whether anyone had come. When she returned, her face reflected radiance and disbelief. ‘They're standing in line to get in! There are crowds outside!’ Despite rain and storm, the jams of people on opening night filled us with incredulity and exuberance.

ABAA-sponsored antiquarian book fairs have prospered since 1960, as has the ABAA itself; the organization currently has more than 450 members.

== Activities ==
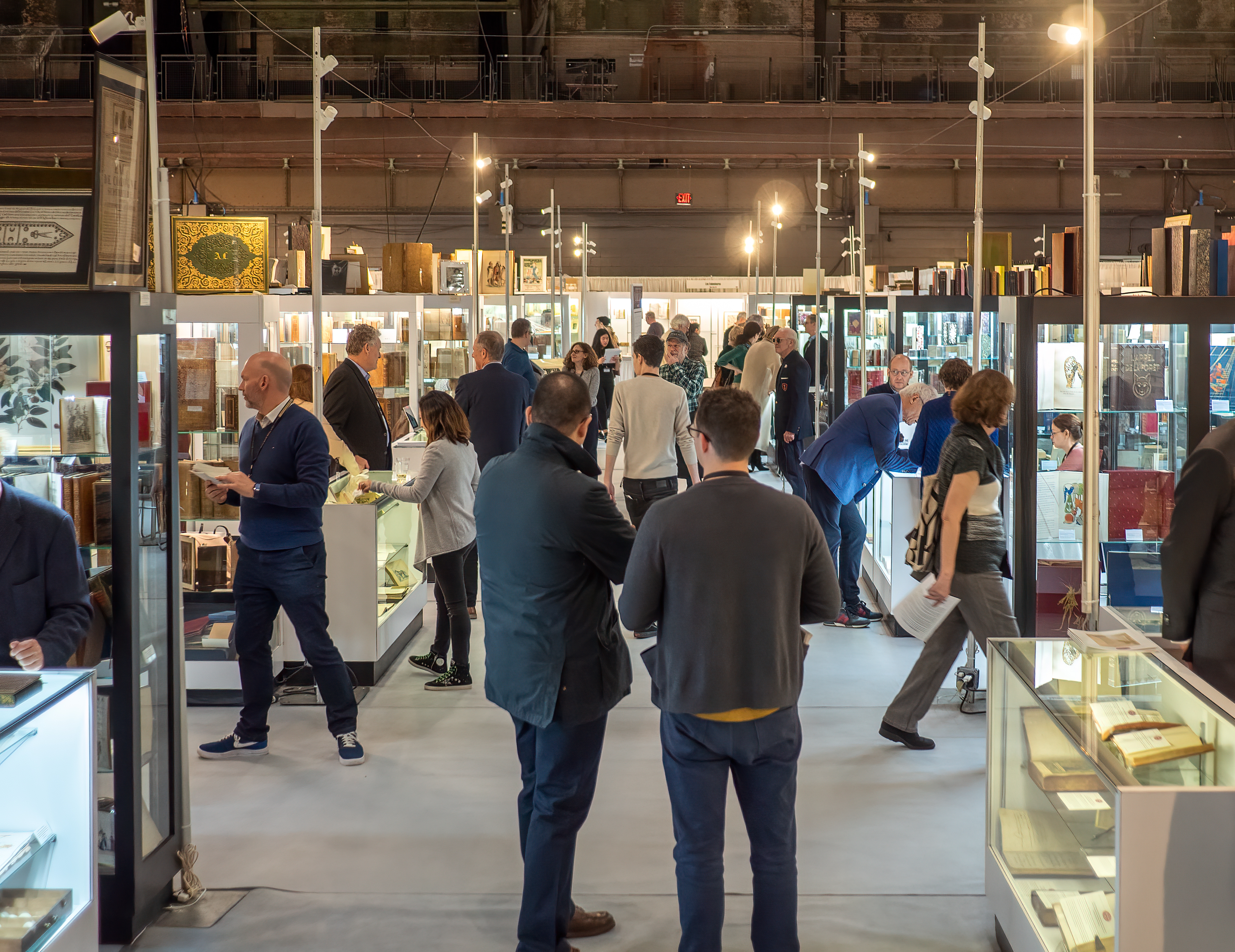
New York Antiquarian Book Fair in 2020

The non-profit organization's more than 450 members deal in rare books, autographs, historical documents, prints, and maps, and its members have provided guidance in building the world's foremost private and institutional collections. In addition to sales and guidance, many members offer appraisals. The association maintains a website featuring educational articles and resources about the rare book trade, as well as a searchable membership database. The website's database of books for sale lists approximately two million fine and rare books for sale by members. The ABAA also publishes an annual membership directory and a quarterly online newsletter. The association created the Elisabeth Woodburn Fund in honor of a past president of the association which periodically offers scholarships to members and non-members to further their education in the trade. The association's Benevolent Fund offers financial assistance to member and non-member booksellers in times of hardship. The ABAA is a sponsor, with FABS (Fellowship of American Bibliophilic Societies) and The Center for the Book and Rare Book and Manuscript Division in the Library of Congress, of the National Collegiate Book Collecting Contest.

=== Book fairs ===
The ABAA currently hosts three antiquarian book fairs per year: California in February (Los Angeles and San Francisco in alternating years), New York in April, and Boston in November. Exhibitors must be members of the ABAA or of an ILAB association.

=== Website ===
The ABAA has an e-commerce website hosted by Bibliopolis and Biblio.com which exhibits members' books for sale. The site, launched in 2009, features over 2 million rare books from 200 of its members and has full search, browse and e-commerce capabilities.

== Membership ==
Applicants must have been in the business of rare books or printed matter a minimum of four years, be sponsored by three current members, and provide three references as basic requirements for membership. The ABAA has a comprehensive code of ethics by which all of its members must abide, requiring authentication and accurate description of all items offered for sale.

== See also ==
- Antiquarian Booksellers Association (British Isles)
- Antiquarian Booksellers Association of Austria
- Antiquarian Booksellers Association of Japan
- Antiquarian Booksellers Association of Korea
- Australian and New Zealand Association of Antiquarian Booksellers
- Belgian Antiquarian Booksellers Association
- Books in the United States
- Danish Antiquarian Booksellers Association
- Syndicat National de la Librairie Ancienne et Moderne (SLAM)
- Nederlandsche Vereeniging van Antiquaren
- Vereinigung der Buchantiquare und Kupferstichhändler in der Schweiz
