= Libreria antiquaria Bourlot =

Book store in Turin, Italy

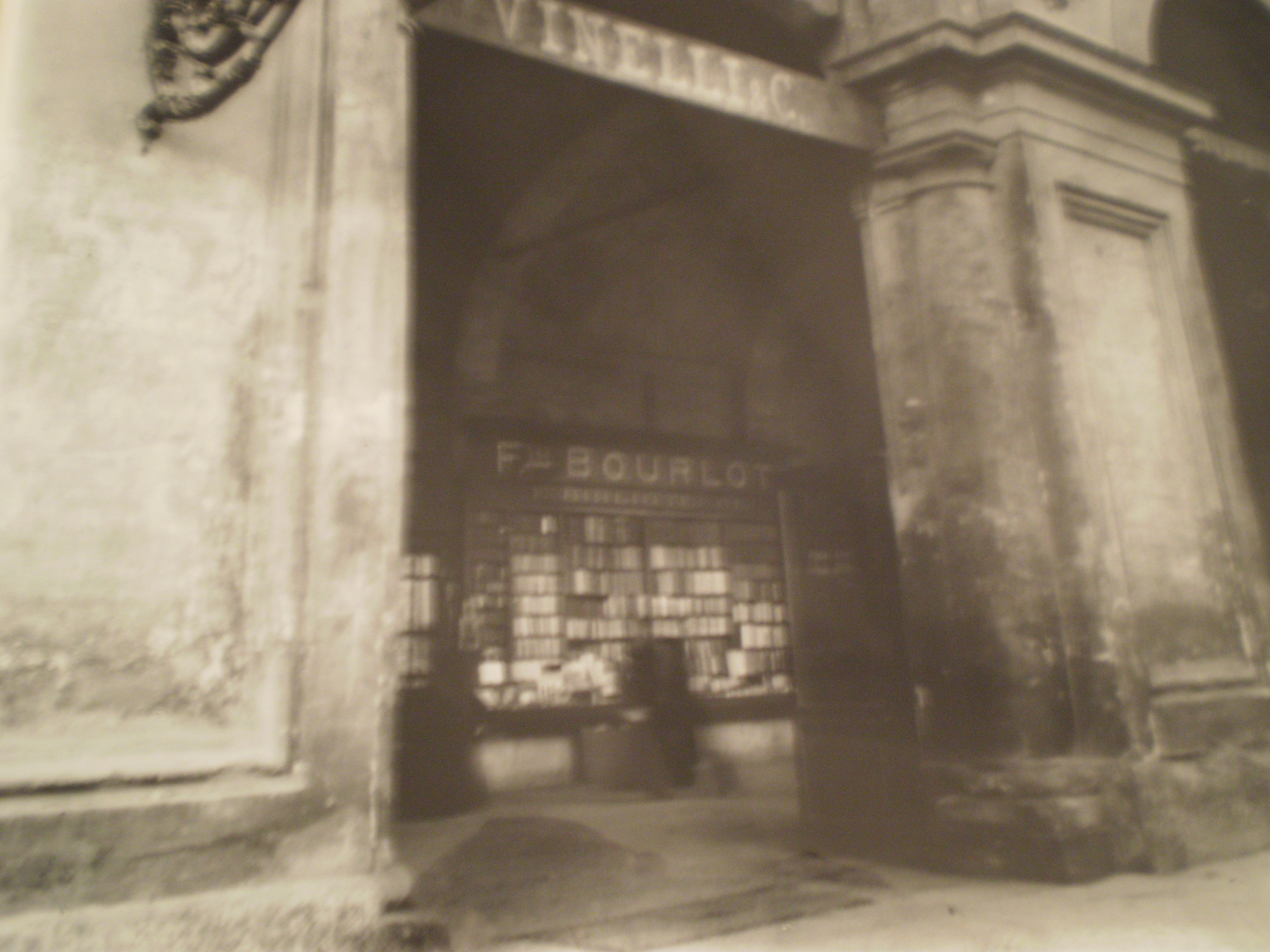
Libreria Antiquaria Bourlot

Libreria antiquaria Bourlot is an historic antiquarian bookshop in Turin, Italy. It was founded in 1848 by Vittorio and Pietro Bourlot in the courtyard of a seventeenth-century palace at the Piazza San Carlo. It was owned by the Bourlot family for five generations. In 1947, owner Gian Vittorio Bourlot founded, with 18 other members, what is now known as the A.L.A.I. (Associazione Librai Antiquari d'Italia). For most of the last fifty years the shop has belonged to the Birocco family. The present owner is Marco Birocco.

== See also ==
- International League of Antiquarian Booksellers
- Books in Italy
