= Sarum Master =

Painter active in England in the 13th century

Nativity scene from the Crawford Missal

The Sarum Master (or Sarum Illuminator) was a painter active in England in the 13th century. His real name is unknown. He is known for his illuminated manuscripts, although a wall painting in the chapel of the episcopal palace at Chichester has also been attributed to him. He was probably the master of a workshop who did not personally apply all the paint himself. The five manuscripts of his established oeuvre, in probable chronological order, are:

- Wilton Psalter
- Crawford Missal
- Amesbury Psalter
- Bible of William of Hales
- Paris Apocalypse

To the Master have also been attributed:

- Bodley Bestiary
- Harley Bestiary
- Sarum Master Bible

In addition, a medical manuscript owned by Robert von Hirsch as of 1933 is believed to have been looted by the Nazis and is now lost.

The artist of the Bodley Bestiary has also been called a "precursor" in style to the Sarum Master. The earlier Glazier Psalter is also similar in style.

== Gallery ==
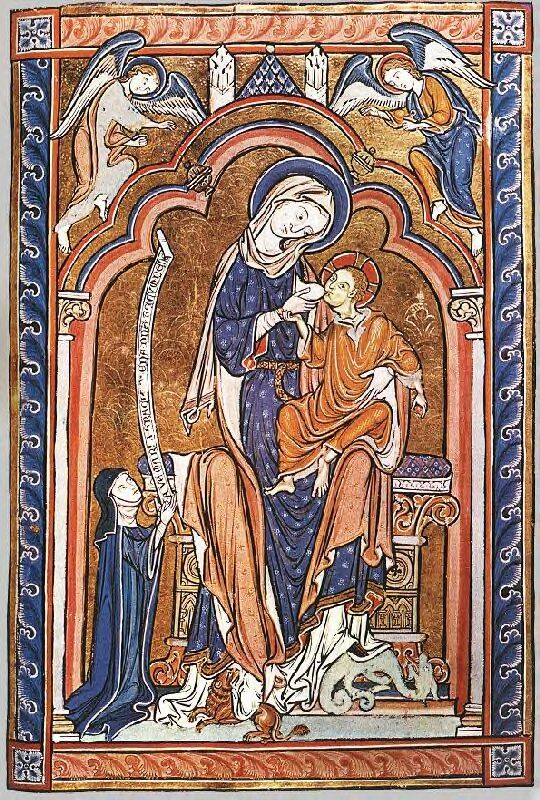
Madonna lactans in the donor portrait from the Amesbury Psalter

Bonnacon from the Bodley Bestiary

Elephant and dragon from the Harley Bestiary

Two pages from the Paris Apocalypse

== Works cited ==
- Baxter, Ronald (1987). "A Baronial Bestiary: Heraldic Evidence for the Patronage of MS Bodley 764". Journal of the Warburg and Courtauld Institutes. 50 (1): 196–200.
- Hollaender, Albert (1943). "The Sarum Illuminator and His School". Wiltshire Archaeological and Natural History Magazine. 50 (179): 230–262.
- Petzold, Andreas (2022). "Color and Meaning in Medieval Art: The Case of the Missal of Henry of Chichester". De Medio Aevo: 1–15.
- Reeve, Matthew M. (2008). Thirteenth-century Wall Painting of Salisbury Cathedral: Art, Liturgy, and Reform. Boydell Press.
