= Antiquarian Booksellers Association of Japan =

The Antiquarian Booksellers Association of Japan (ABAJ) was established in November 1964 by ten major antiquarian booksellers from Tokyo, Osaka and Kyoto. Japan was experiencing an unprecedented economic growth at the time and Japanese collectors, scholars, and curators were avidly selling and purchasing rare material domestically and internationally. The ABAJ was founded with the aim of developing the Japanese antiquarian book trade to meet an increasingly global age. In 1965, the ABAJ became a member of the International League of Antiquarian Booksellers. Since then, the ABAJ has grown to include thirty members.

The ABAJ has been involved in various activities including joint bookfairs by its members, the publication of bibliographical reference works, the sponsoring of lectures on antiquarian books, the organisation of field trips to private and institutional collections, and the donation of books to centers for senior citizens. In 1973 and 1990 the ABAJ hosted two ILAB Congresses and an International Bookfair held in Tokyo.

== See also ==
- International League of Antiquarian Booksellers
- Australian and New Zealand Association of Antiquarian Booksellers
- Antiquarian Booksellers Association of Austria
- Antiquarian Booksellers Association
- Syndicat National de la Librairie Ancienne et Moderne (SLAM)
- Antiquarian Booksellers' Association of America
- Danish Antiquarian Booksellers Association
- Belgian Antiquarian Booksellers Association
- Antiquarian Booksellers Association of Korea
- Nederlandsche Vereeniging van Antiquaren
- Vereinigung der Buchantiquare und Kupferstichhändler in der Schweiz
