= Books in Italy =

Italy is the home of two of the world's biggest publishers of books in terms of revenue: Messaggerie Italiane and Mondadori Libri. Other large publishers include De Agostini Editore, Feltrinelli and the RCS MediaGroup. (Note: Messaggerie and Mondadori also topped the list in 2016 and 2017.)

== History ==
Early printing press on Italian soil were established by a German colony in Subiaco in 1464, when Arnold Pannartz and Konrad Sweynheim produced a Latin grammar by Donatus. Printing technology later developed in the 1460s in Rome and Venice, and in the 1470s in Bergamo, Bologna, Brescia, Cremona, Ferrara, Florence, Genoa, Lucca, Mantua, Messina, Milan, Modena, Naples, Padua, Palermo, Parma, Pavia, Perugia, Piacenza, Reggio Calabria, Treviso, Turin, Verona and Vicenza. By the 1480s printing facilities were also present in L'Aquila, Pisa, Reggio Emilia, Siena, and Udine.

At the time of Italian unification and the creation of the Kingdom of Italy in 1861, the Biblioteca Magliabechiana in Florence merged with the Biblioteca Palatina Lorenese, and by 1885 became known as the Biblioteca Nazionale Centrale di Firenze (National Central Library). The Biblioteca Nazionale Centrale di Roma was founded in 1876. As official legal deposit libraries, both maintain copies of all works published in Italy.

Notable publishers in Italy include Valentino Bompiani, Giovanni De Agostini, Giulio Einaudi, Giangiacomo Feltrinelli, Aldo Garzanti, Ulrico Hoepli, Leo Longanesi, Arnoldo Mondadori, Angelo Rizzoli and Albert Skira.

The United Nations Educational, Scientific and Cultural Organization named Turin the 2006 World Book Capital.

== Bookselling ==
Notable bookstores in Italy include:

- Casella Studio Bibliografico (est. 1825), Naples
- Feltrinelli (est. 1954), chain retailer
- Libreria antiquaria Bourlot (est. 1848), Turin
- Libreria Antiquaria Pregliasco (est. 1912), Turin
- Libreria Internazionale Luxemburg (est. 1872), Turin
- Libreria Babele (est. 1987), Milan
- Libreria Bozzi (est. 1810), Genoa
- Libreria Internazionale Hoepli (est. 1879), Milan
- Mondadori Mediastore (est. 1907), Milan
- Rizzoli (est. 1927), Milan

== Fairs ==
- Bologna Children's Book Fair
- Turin International Book Fair

== In popular culture ==
- The Name of the Rose (film), 1986

== See also ==
- Category:Book publishing companies of Italy
- Collection (publishing)
- Publishing in Italy (in Italian)
- List of libraries in Italy
- Italian bibliophiles (fr)
- Italian literature
- Media of Italy
- Copyright law of Italy

== Bibliography ==
=== in English ===
- G.W. Porter; G.K. Fortescue, eds. (1889). "Bibliographies of Countries: Italy". List of Bibliographical Works in the Reading Room of the British Museum (2nd ed.). London. OCLC 3816244 – via Internet Archive.
- George Haven Putnam (1897). "Privileges and Censorship in Italy, 1498-1798". Books and Their Makers During the Middle Ages. US: G. P. Putnam's Sons.
- Robert Proctor (1898). "Books Printed From Types: Italy". Index to the Early Printed Books in the British Museum. London: Kegan Paul, Trench, Trübner and Company. pp. 221+. hdl:2027/uc1.c3450631. OCLC 6438080 – via HathiTrust.
- Felix Reichmann (1938). "Book Trade at the Time of the Roman Empire". Library Quarterly. 8 (1): 40–76. doi:10.1086/614173. JSTOR 4302429. S2CID 144265336.
- John F. Peckham (1940). Early printing in Italy, with special reference to the classics, 1469-1517. US: Princeton University Library.
- Allen Kent; et al., eds. (1978). "Printers and Printing". Encyclopedia of Library and Information Science. Vol. 23. Dekker. ISBN 978-0-8247-2023-0. (Includes info about Italy)
- M.D. Feld (1985). "A Theory of the Early Italian Printing Firm". Harvard Library Bulletin. 33. US. ISSN 0017-8136. + part 2, 1986
- Enzo Esposito; et al. (1990). "Bibliographical Studies in Italy since 1945". Libraries & Culture. 25 (3). US: 433–445. JSTOR 25542279.
- Deborah Parker (1996). "Women in the Book Trade in Italy, 1475-1620". Renaissance Quarterly. 49 (3): 509–541. doi:10.2307/2863365. JSTOR 2863365. S2CID 164039060.
- Paul F. Gehl (2000), Printing History and Book Arts: Recent Trends in the History of the Italian Book, archived from the original on 2017-12-01 – via Newberry Library
- "Italy: Directory: Publishers". Western Europe. Regional Surveys of the World (5th ed.). Europa Publications. 2003. p. 396+. ISBN 978-1-85743-152-0.
- Lisa Pon; Craig Kallendorf, eds. (2009). Books of Venice. Biblioteca Nazionale Marciana. ISBN 9781584562573.
- Paul F. Gehl (2013). "Advertising or Fama? Local Markets for Schoolbooks in Sixteenth-Century Italy". In Benito Rial Costas (ed.). Print Culture and Peripheries in Early Modern Europe: A Contribution to the History of Printing and the Book Trade in Small European and Spanish Cities. Brill. ISBN 9789004235748.
- Neil Harris (2013). "Italy". In Michael F. Suarez; H. R. Woudhuysen (eds.). The Book: A Global History. Oxford University Press. ISBN 978-0-19-967941-6.
- Angela Nuovo (2013). Book Trade in the Italian Renaissance. Brill. ISBN 9789004245471.
- Hannah Marcus (2016). "Bibliography and Book Bureaucracy: Reading Licenses and the Circulation of Prohibited Books in Counter-Reformation Italy". Papers of the Bibliographical Society of America. 110 (4): 433–457. doi:10.1086/689821. S2CID 159814116.

=== in Italian ===
- Bollettino delle pubblicazioni italiane [Bulletin of Italian publications] (in Italian), Biblioteca nazionale centrale di Firenze 1886-
- La Bibliofilia [The Book-Lover] (in Italian), Florence: Olschki 1899-
- "Biblioteca di bibliografia italiana", Biblioteca di Bibliografia Italiana Bbi (in Italian), Olschki, ISSN 0067-7418 1923-

== Images ==
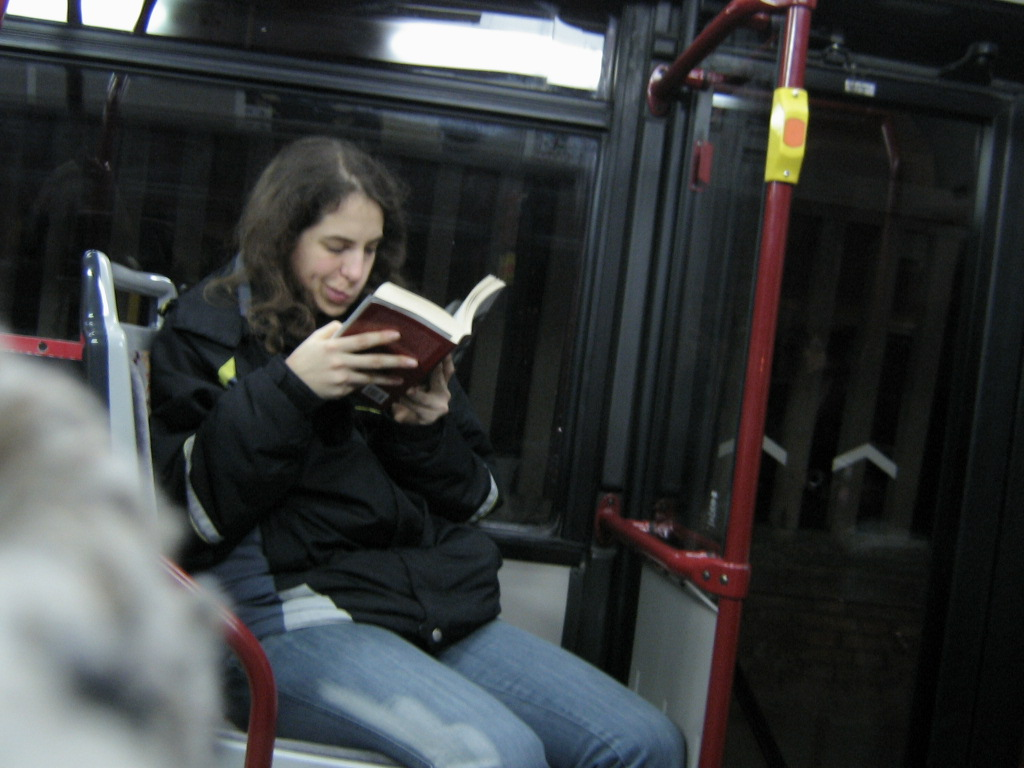
Reader on bus, Italy, 2006

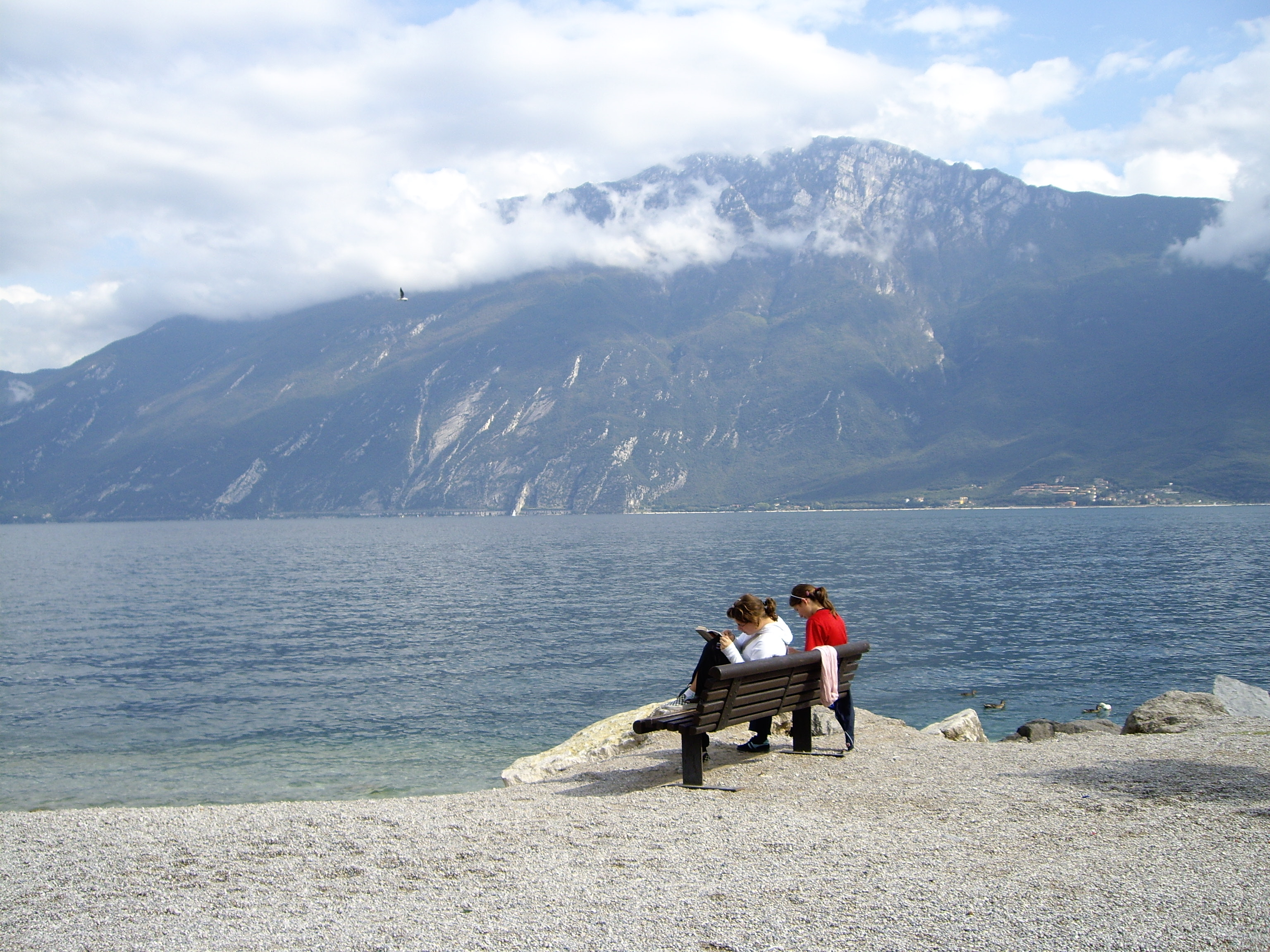
Readers in Limone sul Garda, Brescia, 2007
