= Beuf =

Beuf may refer to:

- 8127 Beuf, a main-belt asteroid, named after French astronomer Francisco Beuf (1834–1889)
- Antone Beuf (Antonio Beuf), founder of the Libreria Bozzi, the oldest bookshop in Italy
- Sylvain Beuf (born 1964), a French jazz saxophonist and composer
