= Madeleine B. Stern =

American independent scholar and rare book dealer

Madeleine Bettina Stern (July 1, 1912 – August 18, 2007), born in New York, New York, was an independent scholar and rare book dealer. She graduated from Barnard College in 1932 with a B.A. in English literature. She received her M.A. in English literature from Columbia University in 1934. Stern was particularly known for her work on the writer Louisa May Alcott. She received a Guggenheim Fellowship in 1943 to write a biography of Alcott, which was eventually published in 1950. In 1945, she and her partner Leona Rostenberg opened Rostenberg & Stern Books. Rostenberg and Stern were active members of the Antiquarian Booksellers' Association of America, at a time when few women were members. The pair lived and worked in Rostenberg's house in the Bronx. They were known for creating unique rare book catalogs. In 1960, Stern helped found the New York Antiquarian Book Fair.

Stern and Leona Rostenberg became widely known in the late 1990s while in their late eighties when their memoir on the rare book trade, Old Books, Rare Friends, became a best seller.

== Books by Madeleine B. Stern ==
- The Life of Margaret Fuller, 1942.
- Louisa May Alcott, 1950 (revised editions published in 1971 and 1996).
- Purple Passage: The Life of Mrs. Frank Leslie, 1955 (revised edition, 1970).
- Imprints on History: Book Publishers and American Frontiers, 1956.
- We the Women: Career Firsts of Nineteenth-Century America, 1963.
- So Much in a Lifetime: The Story of Dr. Isabel Barrows, 1964.
- Queen of Publishers' Row: Mrs. Frank Leslie, 1965.
- The Pantarch: A Biography of Stephen Pearl Andrews, 1968.
- Heads and Headlines: The Phrenological Fowlers, 1971.
- Books and Book People in Nineteenth-Century America, 1978.
- Sherlock Holmes: Rare-Book Collector, 1981.
- A Phrenological Dictionary of Nineteenth-Century Americans, 1982.
- The Game's a Head: A Phrenological Case-Study of Sherlock Holmes and Arthur Conan Doyle, 1983.
- Antiquarian Bookselling in the United States: A History from the Origins to the 1940s, 1985.
- Nicholas Gouin Dufief of Philadelphia, Franco-American Bookseller, 1776–1834, The Philobiblon Club, 1988, ISBN 0-9620-7730-5.
- Studies in the Franco-American Booktrade during the Late 18th and Early 19th Centuries, 1994.
- The Feminist Alcott: Stories of a Woman's Power, 1996.
- Louisa May Alcott: From Blood & Thunder to Hearth and Home, 1998.

== Books co-authored by Leona Rostenberg and Madeleine B. Stern ==
- Old and Rare: Thirty Years in the Book Business, 1974.
- Between Boards: New Thoughts on Old Books, 1978.
- Bookman's Quintet: Five Catalogues about Books: Bibliography, Printing History, Booksellers, Libraries, Presses, Collectors, 1979.
- Quest Book—Guest Book: A Biblio-Folly, 1993.
- Connections: Ourselves—Our Books, 1994.
- Old Books in the Old World: Reminiscences of Book-buying Abroad, 1996.
- Old Books, Rare Friends: Two Literary Sleuths and Their Shared Passion, 1997.
- New Worlds in Old Books, 1999.
- Books Have Their Fates, 2001.
- Bookends: Two Women, One Enduring Friendship, 2001.
- From Revolution to Revolution: Perspectives on Publishing and Bookselling 1501-2001, 2002.

== Books edited by Madeleine B. Stern ==
- Behind a Mask: The Unknown Thrillers of Louisa May Alcott, 1975.
- Plots and Counterplots: More Unknown Thrillers of Louisa May Alcott, 1976 (in paperback, A Marble Woman, 1976).
- Louisa's Wonder Book-An Unknown Alcott Juvenile; With an Introduction and Bibliography, 1975.
- A Double Life: Newly Discovered Thrillers of Louisa May Alcott, 1988.

and others.

== See also ==
- Antiquarian book trade in the United States
- Books in the United States
