= Crawford Missal =

13th-century illuminated manuscript from England

Donor portrait showing Henry kneeling before a Madonna and Child

The Crawford Missal, also called the Missal of Henry of Chichester or Chichester Missal, is a 13th-century illuminated manuscript from England, now kept in the John Rylands Library in Manchester, where it is Latin MS 24. It is the most well-known missal of the Sarum Use, since it was the basis for John Wickham Legg's 1916 edition. It is unique among English missals in having a series of full-page miniatures, including a donor portrait, a feature more typical of privately-held psalters.

The Crawford Missal consists of 256 leaves of parchment measuring 318 by 203 millimetres (12.5 in × 8.0 in). The original skin over board binding remains intact. The text is written in two columns, with 35 lines to the page. It contains historiated initials in several places and a sequence of full-page miniatures illustrating the life of Jesus in the middle, before the Canon of the Mass.

The missal was produced in Salisbury Cathedral around 1250. The paintings were executed by the artist known as the Sarum Master. Its original owner, Henry of Chichester (Latin: Henricus de Cicestria), had donated it to Exeter Cathedral by 1277. Henry is probably the canon of Exeter who was also treasurer of the collegiate church of Crediton in 1242. A canon of Exeter called de Cirencestre in a document of 1249 may be the same person. It is impossible to know if the place he was from is Chichester or Cirencester. He may also be identified with the precentor of Crediton who resigned in 1264. A note from around 1300 values the manuscript at the relatively high price of 60 shillings. It is mentioned in the Exeter inventories of 1327 and 1506.

Enriqueta Rylands, founder of the Rylands Library, purchased the manuscript from James Lindsay, 26th Earl of Crawford, in 1901.

== Works cited ==
- Edge, Joanne (n.d.). "Missal (Sarum) (Latin MS 24)". Manchester Digital Collections.
- Mellinkoff, Ruth (1993). Outcasts: Signs of Otherness in Northern and European Art of the Late Middle Ages. Vol. 1. University of California Press.
- Petzold, Andreas (2022). "Color and Meaning in Medieval Art: The Case of the Missal of Henry of Chichester". De Medio Aevo: 1–15.
- Pfaff, Richard W. (2010). The Liturgy in Medieval England: A History. Cambridge University Press.
- Rose-Troup, Frances (1921). "Henry de Cicestria's Missal". Bulletin of the John Rylands Library. 6 (3): 361–364.
