= Roger S. Wieck =

Roger S. Wieck (January 30, 1952 – March 13, 2026) was an American art historian, curator, author, and collector. He served as head of the Morgan Library and Museum's Department of Medieval and Renaissance Manuscripts from 2015 through 2025.

== Early life and education ==
Wieck was born January 30, 1952. He was educated at the University of Cincinnati, where he received a masters degree in art history and did further graduate work at the Institute of Fine Arts of New York University. As a graduate student, he did an internship at the Morgan Library and his initial stay there lasted two years.

== Career ==
After appointments at Baltimore's Walters Art Museum and the Houghton Library of Harvard University, he returned to the Morgan Library in 1989. In 2015, he was appointed Melvin R. Seiden Curator and Department Head of Medieval and Renaissance Manuscripts.

Wieck retired from the Morgan Library effective January 1, 2026 and died of cancer March 13, 2026.

== Books ==
Wieck was the author or editor of a number of books including

- ——— (1988). Time sanctified: the Book of hours in medieval art and life (1st ed.). New York: G. Braziller in association with the Walters Art Gallery, Baltimore. ISBN 0807611891.
- Kren, Thomas; ——— (1990). The Visions of Tondal from the library of Margaret of York. Malibu, Calif: J. Paul Getty Museum. ISBN 0-89236-169-7.
- with William M. Voelkle, The Bernard H. Breslauer Collection of Manuscript Illuminations (1992)
- Mathews, Thomas F.; ———, eds. (1994). Treasures in Heaven: Armenian illuminated manuscripts. New York : Princeton, N.J: Pierpont Morgan Library ; Distributed by Princeton University Press. ISBN 978-0691037516.
- Painted Prayers: The Book of Hours in Medieval and Renaissance Art (1997)
- The Prayer Book of Anne de Bretagne (1999)
- The Prayer Book of Claude de France (2010)

== Personal Life ==
Raised Catholic, Wieck stated that he "became a nonbeliever gradually when [he] was in [his] 20s" and did not believe in God.

Wieck was married to Jean-François Vilain (1942 – 2025) and they lived in New York City's Kips Bay neighborhood. Property from their personal art collection was sold at auction in 2026 by Stair Galleries to benefit the Morgan Library.
