= Associazione Librai Antiquari d'Italia =

ALAI logo

The Associazione dei Librai Antiquari d'Italia (ALAI), the national antiquarian book association of Italy, was founded in 1947 as Circolo dei Librai Antiquari.

In spite of a previous attempt, established in the 1880s by Italian jurist Carlo Lozzi and his review Il bibliofilo, the association was created only after the Second World War and it assumed its current name in 1971.

ALAI includes 116 members throughout Italy and its main scope is to promote the knowledge about ancient and rare books, as well as to represent the Italian antiquarian booksellers within the International League of Antiquarian Booksellers (ILAB), whose it is a founding member.

The association organizes annually international antiquarian book fairs in Milan, Bologna and at the Turin International Book Fair and promoted several other cultural events throughout the past years in Florence and Rome.

It also hosted five LILA-ILAB Congresses and Presidents' meeting, in Milan (1953), Ravenna (1964), Turin (1974), Venice (1986), Florence (1999) and will host the 39th International Congress in Bologna in 2010.

The current President of ALAI is Umberto Pregliasco, elected in 2004 and confirmed in 2006 and 2008.

== See also ==
- Libreria antiquaria Bourlot, whose owner, Gian Vittorio Bourlot, was one of the cofounders of ALAI
