= Leona Rostenberg =

American scholar, historian, book dealer (1908–2005)

- Born: December 28, 1908; The Bronx, New York City, New York, United States
- Died: March 17, 2005 (aged 96); New York City, New York, United States
- Occupations: Independent scholar, rare books dealer
- Known for: Scholarship on book history; memoir Old Books, Rare Friends

Leona Rostenberg (December 28, 1908 – March 17, 2005) was an independent scholar and rare books dealer born in New York, New York.

== Biography ==
Rostenberg was born in the Bronx on December 28, 1908. Her father, Adolf, was a dermatologist.

Rostenberg and her decades-long friend and business partner Madeleine B. Stern became widely known in the late 1990s while in their late eighties when their memoir on the rare book trade, Old Books, Rare Friends, became a best seller.

In addition to many books on book history and book collecting, Rostenberg wrote numerous articles over the years for many publications, including Journal of Modern History, American Historical Review, and Library Quarterly.

Rostenberg died on March 17, 2005, after suffering from heart problems for two years.

== Books ==
- English Publishers in the Graphic Arts, 1599–1700: A Study of the Print-Sellers and Publishers of Engravings, Art and Architectural Manuals, Maps, and Copy-Books, 1963.
- Literary, Political, Scientific, Religious, and Legal Publishing, Printing, and Bookselling in England, 1551–1700: Twelve Studies (two volume set), 1965.
- The Minority Press and the English Crown: A Study in Repression, 1558–1625, 1971.
- An Antiquarian's Credo, 1976.
- Bibliately, 1978.
- The Library of Robert Hooke: The Scientific Book Trade of Restoration England, 1989.

Co-authored with Madeleine B. Stern

- Old and Rare: Thirty Years in the Book Business, 1974.
- Between Boards: New Thoughts on Old Books, 1978.
- Bookman's Quintet: Five Catalogues about Books: Bibliography, Printing History, Booksellers, Libraries, Presses, Collectors, 1979.
- Quest Book—Guest Book: A Biblio-Folly, 1993.
- Connections: Ourselves—Our Books, 1994.
- Old Books in the Old World: Reminiscences of Book-buying Abroad, 1996.
- Old Books, Rare Friends: Two Literary Sleuths and Their Shared Passion, 1997.
- New Worlds in Old Books, 1999.
- Books Have Their Fates, 2001.
- Bookends: Two Women, One Enduring Friendship, 2001.
- From Revolution to Revolution: Perspectives on Publishing and Bookselling 1501-2001, 2002.

== See also ==
- Antiquarian book trade in the United States
