= Turin International Book Fair =

Annual Italian literary trade fair

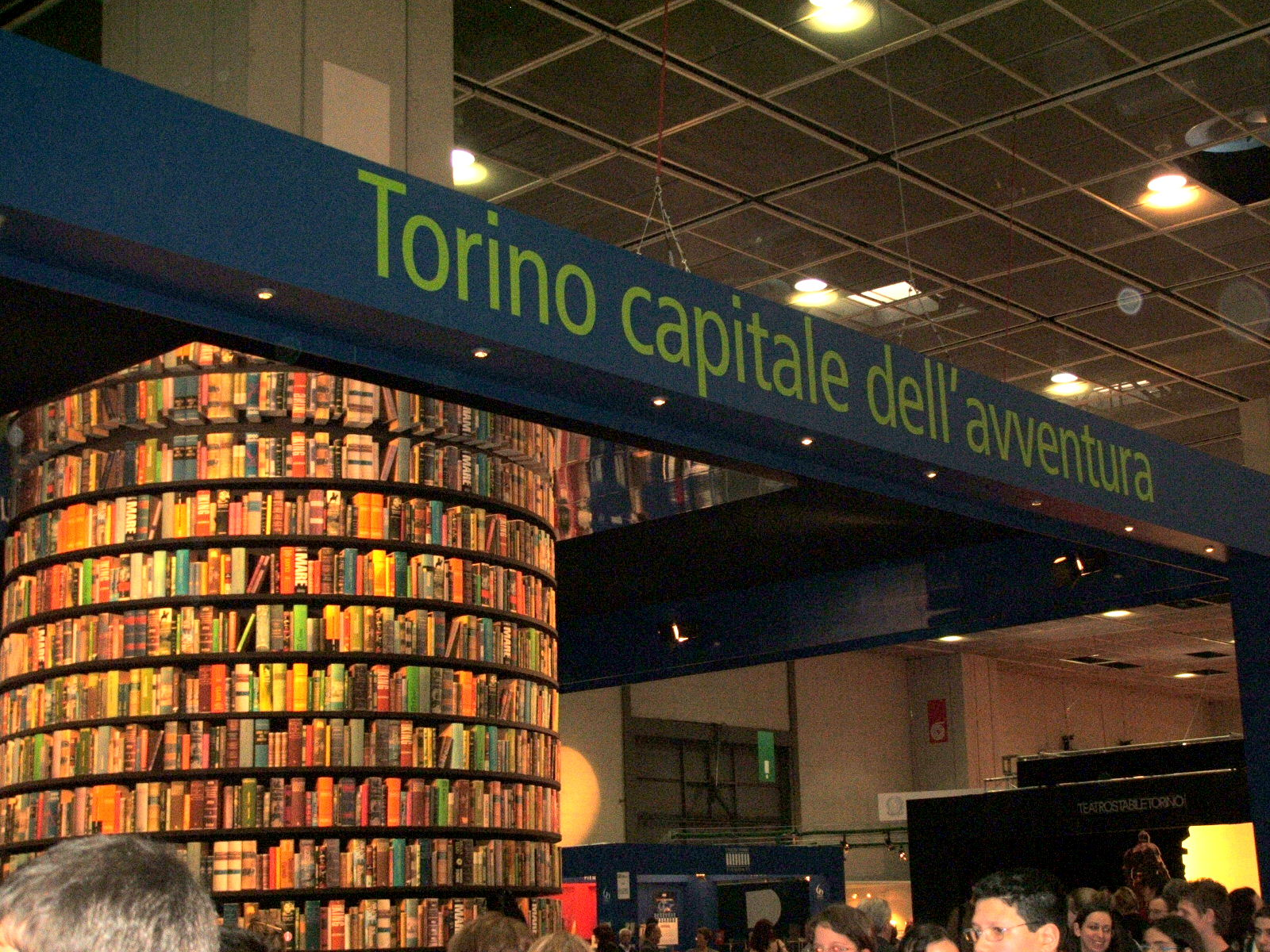
Fiera del libro - XIX edition

The Turin International Book Fair (Italian: Salone Internazionale del Libro di Torino) is Italy's largest trade fair for books, held annually in mid-May in Turin, Italy.

Founded in 1988 as Book Showroom (Italian: Salone del Libro), it is one of the largest book fairs in Europe, involving more than 1,400 exhibitors and 341,000 visitors in 2015.

== History ==
It was founded in 1988 with the name Salone del Libro by the entrepreneur Guido Accornero and the bookseller Angelo Pezzana. The opening ceremony was held on May 18, 1988, at the opera house Teatro Regio, with the Nobel laureate Joseph Brodsky.

It has been held first at Torino Esposizioni and then, since 1992, at Lingotto Fiere.

From 1999 to 2009, because of disagreements with owner of the trade name Salone del Libro, the organization changed its name to Fiera del Libro (from 2002, Fiera Internazionale del Libro). Since 2010 it is called again Salone Internazionale del Libro.

From 1999 to 2016 the director has been the Italian writer Ernesto Ferrero, winner of the Strega Prize in 2000 with the novel N.

From October, 2016, the director is the Italian writer Nicola Lagioia, also winner of the Strega Prize in 2015 with the novel La ferocia (a.k.a. "The ferocity").

== Guest of honour ==
Every year a guest of honor is named for the fair. A special exhibition hall is set up for the guest country, and the major publishing houses are present at the fair.

Year	Guest of honour/ Hosted countries		Main Theme
2014	Holy See	Christian literature	"Good in plain sight"
2015	Germany	German literature	"Italy's wonders"
2016	Arab states	Arabian literature	"Visions"
2016	Focus: Another Side of America	American literature	"Over the border"

== See also ==
- Books in Italy
