= Libreria Bozzi =

Bookshop in Italy

Libreria Bozzi is the oldest bookshop in Italy. The bookshop is situated in via Cairoli in Genoa.

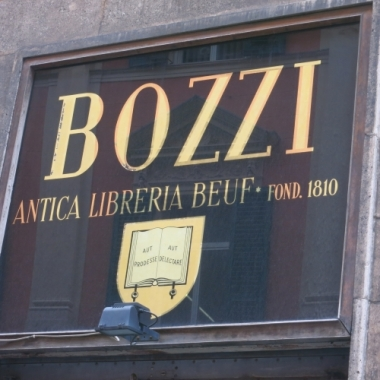
Ensign of Libreria Bozzi (ph. Andrea Carozzi).

== History ==
The bookshop was founded by a Jewish French refugee from Briançon, Antone Beuf (Antonio Beuf), in 1810. The bookshop was visited in the 19th century by the writers Stendhal, Alessandro Manzoni, Charles Dickens, Herman Melville and Henry James.

After Mario Bozzi's death, the bookshop passed to his son Tonino, who was president of the Italian Booksellers Association for 12 years. To this day, the bookshop incorporates a portion of the ancient cloister of the Church of San Siro, whose columns and even the remains of a Turkish bath are still visible.

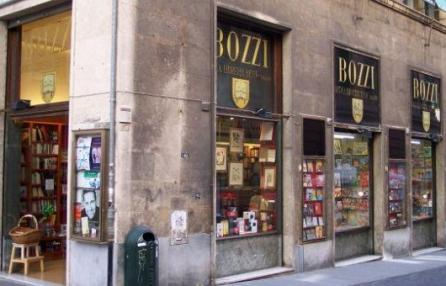
Libreria Bozzi (ph. Andrea Carozzi).

== See also ==
- Books in Italy
