= Hoepli Editore =

Italian publishing house and bookstore

- Founded: 1870; 156 years ago
- Founder: Ulrico Hoepli
- Country of origin: Italy
- Headquarters location: Milan, Italy
- Publication types: Books
- Official website: www.hoepli.it

Hoepli Editore (Italian pronunciation: [ˈ(h)øːpli ediˈtoːre, ˈ(h)ɛːpli -]) is an Italian publishing house and bookstore based in Milan founded in 1870 by Swiss-Italian bookseller Ulrico Hoepli. It was thriving in the XIX and XX centuries. In the 1990s, the catalogue of the publisher exceeded 175,000 titles.

In 2026, the bookstore and the publishing house were liquidated following a prolonged legal battle between shareholders, the fifths generation of the dynasty.

== History ==
=== Launch and first years ===
Born in 1847 in a small village in Canton Thurgau, at the age of 15 Johannes Ulrich Höpli (Italianised Ulrico Hoepli) became a page boy in a small bookshop in Zurich. Four years later, he moved to Triest, where he made up his mind to work in the publishing and bookselling industry. At 23, Hoepli moved to Milan and with the financial help of his brother bought a historic bookshop Laenger, located in Galleria De Cristoforis, a shopping mall built back in 1832 between Corso Vittorio Emanuele and Via Monte Napoleone in the centre of the city. Following an urban development plan, the gallery was demolished in 1931 and replaced by new buildings where the Hoepli bookshop was given a spot in the same area where it was originally located.

The first book to be published was a French grammar book by Memy Bevilacqua, released in 1871. It was followed in 1872 by Guida per arti e mestieri, a technical manual book that became the first in the series of engineer and technical manuals that will make Hoepli publishing famous on the Italian market.

Along with bookselling and publishing activity, in the 1880s and 1890s Hoepli was active as an antiquarian books collector. He acquired numerous private libraries from noble families, building up a collection of over 100,000 titles listed in 150 catalogues, thus cementing his shop’s status as a world leader in the trade of antiquarian books.

=== XX century ===
At the beginning of the XX century, Hoepli publishing house was releasing around 110 titles annually, mostly in the area of its expertise – technical and scientific publications, dictionaries, manuals and instructional books. In the field of the humanities and arts, Hoepli distinguished himself by publishing Codex Atlanticus, a reproduction of 1300 sketches and designs by Leonardo da Vinci, and a 25-tome encyclopedia of Art History by Adolfo Venturi. In 1930, he published Petrarch's Codice Virgiliano, for which he had received special praises by both the Pope and the King of Italy. Later, Heinrich Kiepert's Atlas antiquus became the first Hoepli's publication to exceed a print run of 100,000 copies.

By the time of Ulrico Hoepli's demise in 1935, his publishing house had released 7000 titles. Ulrico Hoepli didn’t have children, so he entrusted his enterprise to his nephews – Carlo Hoepli (1879-1972), son of his elder brother Johann Heinrich, and Erardo Aeschlimann, son of his sister Margarethe.

Around 1938, the bookshop moved to a new spacious and luxurious location in via Berchet. It became the largest and most beautiful in Italy. However, this period was short. In August 1943, the bookshop and its warehouse were destroyed by bombing, resulting in the loss of several million printed copies and most of the printing plates. Of the 4,000 titles listed in the catalogue, only 82 survived. The damage seemed irreparable; the shop had to move to smaller premises, and the entire editorial team was now housed in a single room.

After the war, Ulrico and Gianni Hoepli managed to restore the pre-war publishing and selling activity. In 1955, they published the first volume of the Encyclopaedia Hoepli, the final volume of which was published in 1968. Over 900 authors contributed to the work. In 1958, the new shop was opened in via Hoepli, marking a new era in its history. Spanning across 6 floors, the shop offered more than 175,000 titles and employed 50 staff.

In the 1970s, Hoepli started school publishing. In the 1980s and 1990s, the bookshop's catalog contained around 175,000 titles. The arrival at the presidency of Giovanni Hoepli, son of Ulrico Carlo, directed the catalog more and more towards technology, textbooks, school and university publishing.

=== XXI century ===
In the first quarter of the 20th century, the Hoepli bookshop was already being run by the fifth generation of the family. During this period, the Hoepli bookshop offered more than 500,000 titles spread across six floors, and had established itself as one of Europe’s largest bookshops.

Hoepli bookshop was the finalist for the inaugural "Bookstore of the Year" award at the 2016 London Book Fair International Excellence Awards.

Hoepli announced liquidation in Spring 2026, causing a major public outcry. This historic bookshop has been an important cultural centre in the city for many years. Local residents launched a petition asking the city council to intervene and prevent the shop from closing. Within a few days, the petition had gathered over 60,000 signatures. Residents also held a protest rally outside the shop to voice their opposition to its closure. Giovanni Nava attended the meeting and confirmed in a statement to the press that he disagreed with the decision by the other owners of the company to wind it up. The publishing house and the historic bookshop are currently owned by Barbara, Giovanni e Matteo Hoepli, grandsons of Ulrico Carlo Hoepli holding 49%, and their cousin Giovanni Nava, owner of a 33% stake. The legal battle initiated by his grandmother Bianca Hoepli in Switzerland lasted 10 years and concluded with her receiving her brother Gianni’s share. The case has been referred to the Italian Court of Cassation, and should he win, Giovanni Nava will become the owner of a 57% stake in the company. Earlier in 2024, Nava refused a payout of €10 mln offered to him by cousins for his stake. He also accuses his cousins of deliberately undermining the company, citing a number of management decisions that led to losses in 2024. Meanwhile, the mayor of Milan Giuseppe Sala responded that the city government cannot influence the decisions of the private business entity.

The lease on the building expires on 30 April 2026, and the bookshop will have to vacate the premises by the end of June. Meanwhile, the Mondadori Group made an offer to acquire Hoepli’s educational publishing division.

The bookstore was closed on the 27th of May, 2026.

== See also ==
- List of Italian companies
- Books in Italy

== Literature ==
- Giocondi, Michele (2018). Breve storia dell’editoria italiana (1861-2018) con 110 schede monografiche delle case editrici di ieri e di oggi. Dai fratelli Treves a Jeff Bezos. ISBN 9788833631196.
