= Sant Bani School =

Coordinates: 43°31′24″N 71°39′13″W

- Sanbornton, NH; USA

Information
- Type: PreK-8 coeducational independent day school
- Motto: Be Good; Do Good; Be One
- Established: 1973
- Head of School: Elizabeth Clayton
- Faculty: 28
- Enrollment: 144
- Campus: Rural
- Colors: Blue and white
- Athletics: Fall, winter, spring
- Mascot: Swan
- Website: www.santbani.org

The Sant Bani School is an independent kindergarten through 8th grade independent school located in Sanbornton, New Hampshire, United States. The school was founded in 1973. It can enroll approximately 150 students from kindergarten through eighth grade. The school is accredited by the New England Association of Schools and Colleges, is a member of the National Association of Independent Schools, and is recognized by the IRS as a tax-exempt 501(c)3 organization.

== History ==
Sant Bani School was founded in 1973 as an elementary school with six students, and rapidly grew to include a high school. Adapting to changing demographics, in June 2015 the school adjusted and has focused on succeeding to become a best-in-class elementary program. In 2018 Sant Bani School added a PreSchool Learning Program on campus for students ages 3–5, which has been an immediate success. Initially an outgrowth of Sant Bani Ashram, a spiritual retreat center, the school became an independent organization in 1983 and thrives as a pre-K day school serving students from surrounding towns in the Lakes Region of New Hampshire.

== The meaning of the name "Sant Bani" ==
There are several possible interpretations from the ancient Sanskrit language. In its simplest translation, it means the "Song of the Spirit."

== Academics ==
Classes are small, with 14-18 students as an ideal maximum in the lower grades, and 16-18 in the upper grades. Younger and older children interact frequently.

The curriculum at Sant Bani School emphasizes literacy, mathematics, science and social studies, presented within a developmental framework. Spanish, art, music, drama, technology, health, and physical education are also included in the schedule. Instruction in basic academic skills begins at the lower level and continues through the upper level.

== Arts ==
Art, music, and crafts are integral parts of the daily schedule. Students have the opportunity to participate in activities such as ceramics, weaving, photography, printmaking, dance, drama, choral singing, robotics, music, and ukulele. Private instruction is available in many instruments including flute, guitar, piano, drums, trumpet, and voice. Students present drama and music programs several times each year.

== Athletics ==
Sant Bani School competes inter-scholastically in soccer, cross-country, rock climbing, and spring track. Recreational sports available to the entire student body include cycling, hiking, horseback riding, skating, skiing, and swimming. Organized physical education is part of the curriculum for Grades K-8.
