= Independent Online Booksellers Association =

The Independent Online Booksellers Association (IOBA) is an international trade association of independent used and rare booksellers who sell online. IOBA is dedicated to ethical business practices that promote customer confidence. The organization offers members scholarships for continuing education, a mentorship program, resources for booksellers, and a virtual community for discussions on all aspects of the bookselling profession. With a diverse international membership of over 350 booksellers, IOBA members created and follow standards for ethical and safe bookselling online. Members must provide clear and accurate descriptions and prompt shipping with fair return policies.

== History ==
IOBA was founded in 1999 by a group of independent booksellers to address the opportunities and challenges of the emerging online book selling market. Its purpose is to promote internet bookselling and foster the interests of internet booksellers. On August 22, 2002, IOBA was incorporated in the state of Delaware as a non-profit organization.

== Membership ==
IOBA has over 300 members internationally. Its members sell books through venues including brick and mortar stores, their own websites, book fairs, and online bookselling services, but all members have some or all of their stock available online.

To join, an applicant must have online bookselling experience, a minimum number of books listed, a business license as required by their place of residence, and book descriptions and condition statements presented in terms recognized by the bookselling profession. In addition, the applicant must abide by IOBA's Code of Ethics, which spells out professional standards and return policies.

Applicants who do not meet membership requirements may be eligible for the IOBA Mentorship Program, which matches a professional member with the applicant for one-on-one assistance in developing the applicant's business to meet IOBA standards.

== Governance ==
IOBA operates under a set of bylaws and is governed by a board of directors elected by the membership. The Board of Directors consists of a four-person executive committee and six At-Large Representatives. The executive committee is composed of the officers, who are each elected for a one-year term: President, Vice-President, Secretary and Treasurer. The six At-Large Representatives each serve a three-year term with staggered election dates so that two are elected each year.

Standing committees further the work of IOBA: Membership, Bylaws, Finance, Internet Operations, and Public Relations. The Chairs of these committees are appointed by the President, and are ex-officio, non-voting board members.

== Mission ==
See which states:

The Independent Online Booksellers Association is dedicated to promoting independent online bookselling by:

- Maintaining and enforcing high professional standards among our international membership, backed up by a strong Code of Ethics.
- Furthering bookseller professional development through the establishment of a Mentorship Program, the granting of scholarships, the publication of our online journal the IOBA Standard, and other formal and informal support systems and educational initiatives.
- Promoting trust between customers and booksellers by providing a safe online environment for the sale and purchase of books.
- Fostering consumer awareness of online book buying.
- Interacting with businesses, organizations, and governmental entities that have an impact on online bookselling.
- Providing programs and services that will help member booksellers to strengthen their businesses.

=== Professional standards ===
The IOBA provides resources to booksellers and the general public that promote professionalism and transparency in book descriptions and the selling process. These include a Code of Ethics to which members are required to adhere, guidelines for book condition descriptions, definitions of book-related terms and abbreviations, and an annotated list of reference works useful to booksellers and book buyers.

=== Professional development ===
IOBA supports professional education for booksellers, and offers annual scholarships. The 2010 contest offered two full-tuition scholarships with a stipend for travel expenses. One of these scholarships was reserved for the Colorado Antiquarian Book Seminar (CABS). The other scholarship could be used at CABS, the Rare Book School (RBS), the California Rare Book School (CalRBS) or the London Rare Book School.

IOBA publishes an online magazine called The Standard, with articles pertinent to the bookselling trade and to collectors. It is primarily written by the membership to share their experiences and expertise, but it is available to the general public.

=== Customer Trust ===
IOBA reassures customers with a Book Buyer's Bill of Rights that guarantees accurate descriptions, reasonable shipping costs, and a satisfaction guaranteed return policy.

=== Related organizations ===
IOBA monitors organizations that affect online bookselling and sends alerts to its own members, or writes letters on behalf of the IOBA membership. For example, in December 2009, IOBA issued a warning advisory to members about changing description standards on Half.com that could jeopardize a sellers Half.com and eBay accounts. In early 2010, IOBA sent an official letter to authorities in the United Kingdom (including the UK's OFT), France, Germany and the European Union, protesting at Amazon "Price Parity Policy" labeling it "dangerously anti‐competitive".

== See also ==
- Independent bookstore
- List of booksellers associations
