= Lotte Hellinga =

Book historian of Dutch origin, active in the Netherlands and the UK

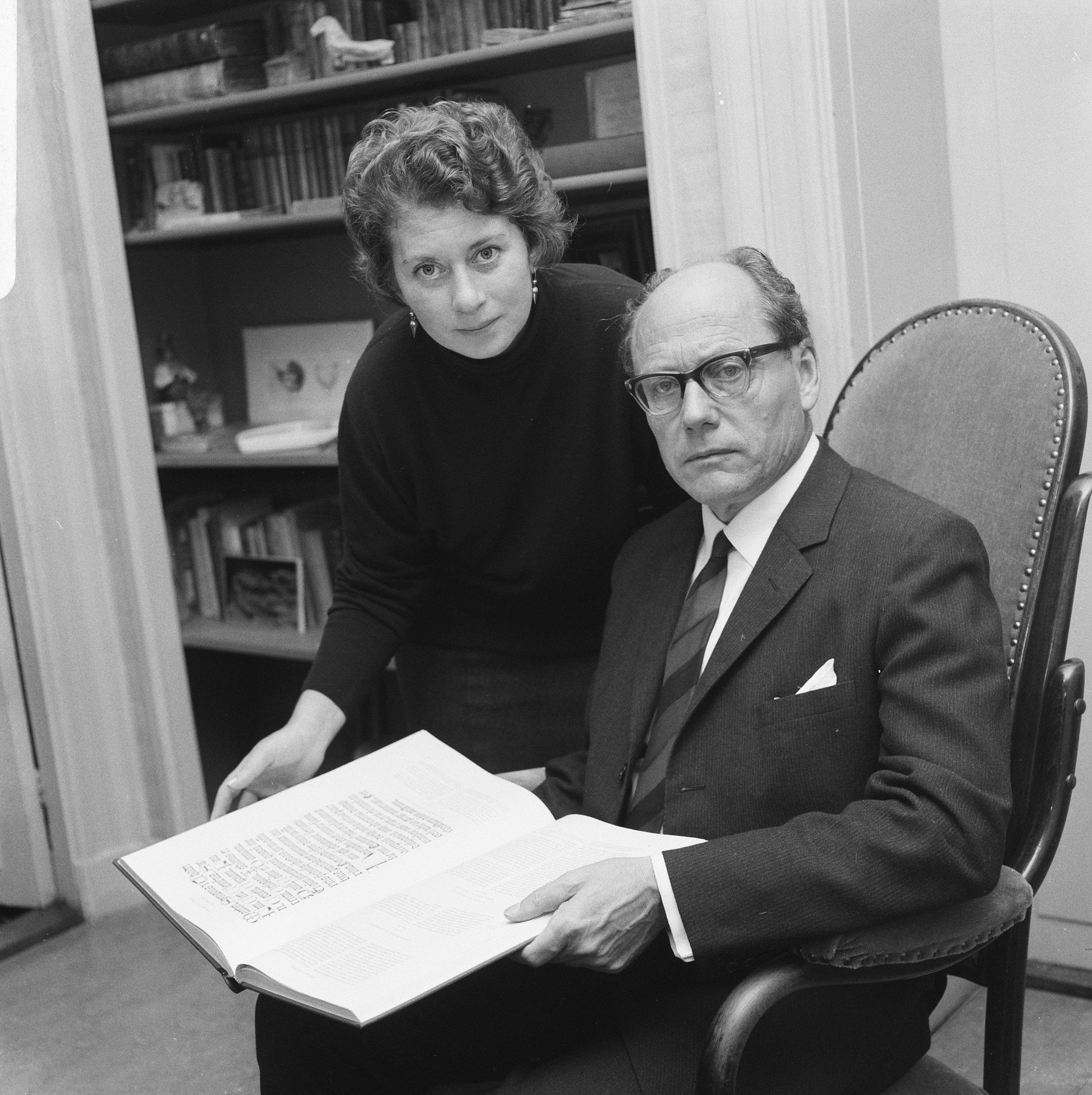
Wytze and Lotte Hellinga with their Printing Types, 1966.

Lotte Hellinga, FBA (née Querido, born 1932) is a book historian and expert in early printing. She is an authority on the work of William Caxton.

== Early life ==
Lotte Hellinga was born in 1932. She studied at the University of Amsterdam under Wytze Hellinga who became her husband in 1973.

== Career ==
Hellinga was a senior lecturer at the University of Amsterdam from 1967 to 1976, and General Secretary of the Consortium of European research libraries from 1992 to 2002. Formerly she was deputy keeper of the British Library.

In 1989 she was awarded the Gutenberg Prize of the International Gutenberg Society and the City of Mainz.

Hellinga was elected a corresponding member of the Royal Netherlands Academy of Arts and Sciences in 1986. In 1990, she was elected a fellow of the British Academy, and from 1991 to 1994, was a member of its Council.

She is an expert in the work of the fifteenth-century printer William Caxton.

== Selected publications ==
- The Fifteenth-Century Printing Types of the Low Countries, 1966. (With W. Hellinga)
- Caxton in Focus: The Beginning of Printing in England. British Library, 1982.
- Analytical Bibliography and the Study of Early Printed Books, Gutenberg-Jahrbuch 1989.
- The Cambridge History of the Book in Britain. Vol. III: 1400-1557. Cambridge University Press, Cambridge, 1999. (Editor, with J. B. Trapp)
- Catalogue of Books Printed in the XVth Century Now in the British Library, Vol 11 ("England") 2007.
- Printing in England in the Fifteenth Century: Duff's Bibliography with supplementary descriptions &c. The Bibliographical Society, London, 2009.
- William Caxton and Early Printing in England. British Library, London, 2010. ISBN 9780712350884
- Texts in Transit: From Manuscript to Proof and Print in the Fifteenth Century. Brill, Leiden, 2014. ISBN 9789004277168
- Incunabula in Transit: People and Trade. Brill, 2018.

== See also ==
- History of books
