= Wytze Hellinga =

Dutch poet, university professor and Dutch language specialist

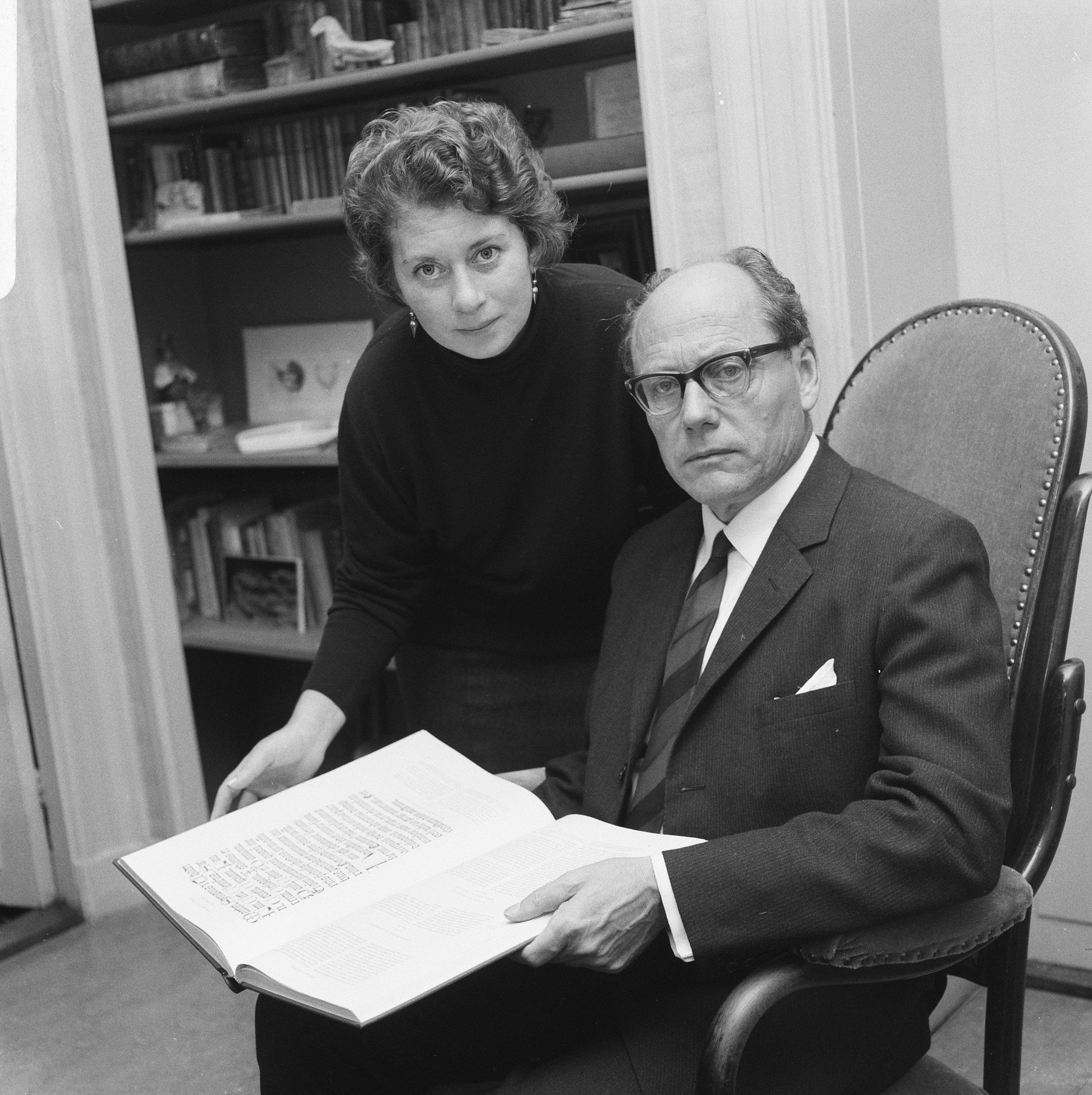
Wytze and Lotte Hellinga with their Printing Types, 1966

Wytze Gerbens Hellinga (20 December, 1908 Haarlem - 16 March, 1985 London) was a Dutch professor of linguistics at the University of Amsterdam.

Hellinga was the son of Gerben Hellinga, a school master and Taatske Zwart, a writer of children's books. Whilst his father adhered to the strict Dutch Reformed Church his mother was a militant socialist and friend of Nienke van Hichtum, who encouraged her in her career.

Hellinga completed his doctorate on the pronunciation of the Dutch language in 1938 at the University of Amsterdam. He had been supervised by Willem Jacob Verdenius. He was later appointed professor at the University in 1946. He remained at the university until his retirement in 1979.

He discovered the only known extant copy of Joos Lambrecht's sixteenth century first edition of the Naembouck (1547) in the library of the Groot Seminarie Warmond.

In 1973 he married Lotte Hellinga, a former student of his. They had co-authored the book The fifteenth-century printing types of the Low Countries published in 1966.
