= Ulrico Hoepli =

Swiss-Italian publisher (1847–1935)

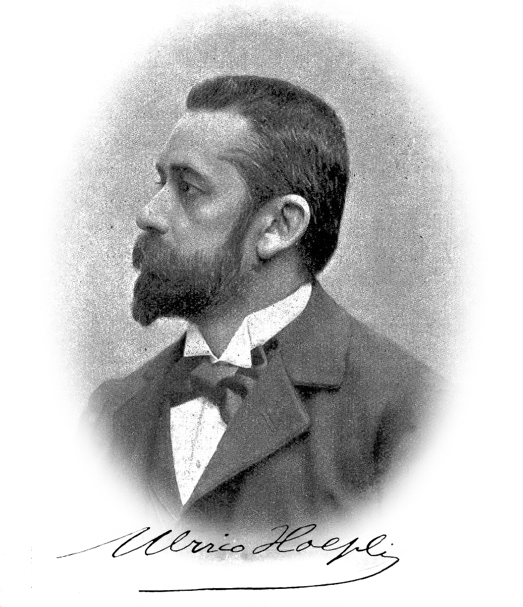
- Born: Johannes Ulrich Höpli; 18 February 1847; Tuttwil, Switzerland
- Died: 24 January 1935 (aged 87); Milan, Italy
- Resting place: Cimitero Monumentale, Milan
- Occupation: Publisher
- Years active: 1871–1935
- Known for: Hoepli Editore

Ulrico Hoepli (Italian: [ulˈriːko ˈ(h)øːpli, - ˈ(h)ɛːpli]; born Johannes Ulrich Höpli, Swiss Standard German: [joˈhanəs ˈʊlrɪç ˈhøːpli]; February 18, 1847 – January 24, 1935) was a Swiss-Italian publisher, the founder of Hoepli Editore.

== Biography ==
Born into a farming family in Tuttwil, a small village now part of Wängi, in the Swiss canton of Thurgau, Hoepli began his career at 14 as an apprentice at the Schabelitz bookstore in Zurich. He later moved to Germany, then to Poland, and eventually to Trieste.

In 1870, Hoepli purchased a small bookstore in Milan, near the Duomo, and moved to the city. His bookstore quickly became a cultural hub for Milan's educated bourgeoisie, offering rare antique books and scientific and technical texts in multiple European languages.

=== Publishing activity ===
In 1871, Ulrico Hoepli expanded into publishing, founding the Hoepli Publishing House, now Hoepli Editore. The first publication was a small French grammar book. He collaborated with institutions like the Milan Polytechnic and the Brera Astronomical Observatory to address the lack of scientific and technical literature in Italy. He created the Hoepli Manuals series in 1875, which eventually comprised over 2,000 titles, including the Manual of the Engineer by Giuseppe Colombo.

In 1934, Hoepli also published Writings and Speeches by Benito Mussolini. Additionally, the publishing house produced prestigious works, such as a reproduction of Leonardo da Vinci’s Codex Atlanticus and the monumental History of Italian Art.

=== Philanthropy ===
In 1911 in Switzerland, he established the Ulrico Hoepli Foundation, dedicated to supporting public initiatives that promote science and the arts.

Hoepli was also a philanthropist. In 1921 he founded the Ulrico Hoepli Popular Library, and in 1930 he commissioned the construction of the Milan Planetarium, which now bears his name.

=== Death and legacy ===
Hoepli died in Milan after sixty-four years of publishing activity. In 1958, the bookstore, then managed by his nephew Carlo, relocated to Via Hoepli, the street posthumously named in his honor.

An asteroid, 8111 Hoepli, was named after him.

== Literature ==
- Giocondi, Michele (2018). Breve storia dell’editoria italiana (1861-2018) con 110 schede monografiche delle case editrici di ieri e di oggi. Dai fratelli Treves a Jeff Bezos. ISBN 9788833631196.
