= Robert von Hirsch =

German industrialist and art collector (1883–1977)

- Born: Robert Max Hirsch; 13 July 1883
- Died: 1 November 1977 (aged 94); Basel, Switzerland
- Citizenship: German Empire (until 1940); Switzerland (since 1940)
- Occupations: Industrialist, art collector, patron
- Spouse: Martha Dreyfus Koch (m. 1945)

Robert Max Hirsch from 1913 von Hirsch (13 July 1883 – 1 November 1977) was a German-born Swiss industrialist and patron of the arts. He was devoted to the arts and built the v. Hirsch Collection since 1907 which entailed pieces from several periods and was among the most famous ones at the time.

== Early life ==
Hirsch was born 13 July 1883 in Frankfurt am Main, German Empire, one of three sons, to Ferdinand Hirsch (1843–1916), an iron wholesaler, and Anna Hirsch (née Mayer). His parents belonged to the assimilated Jewish bourgeoise. His brothers were Paul Hirsch and Karl Hirsch.

== Career ==
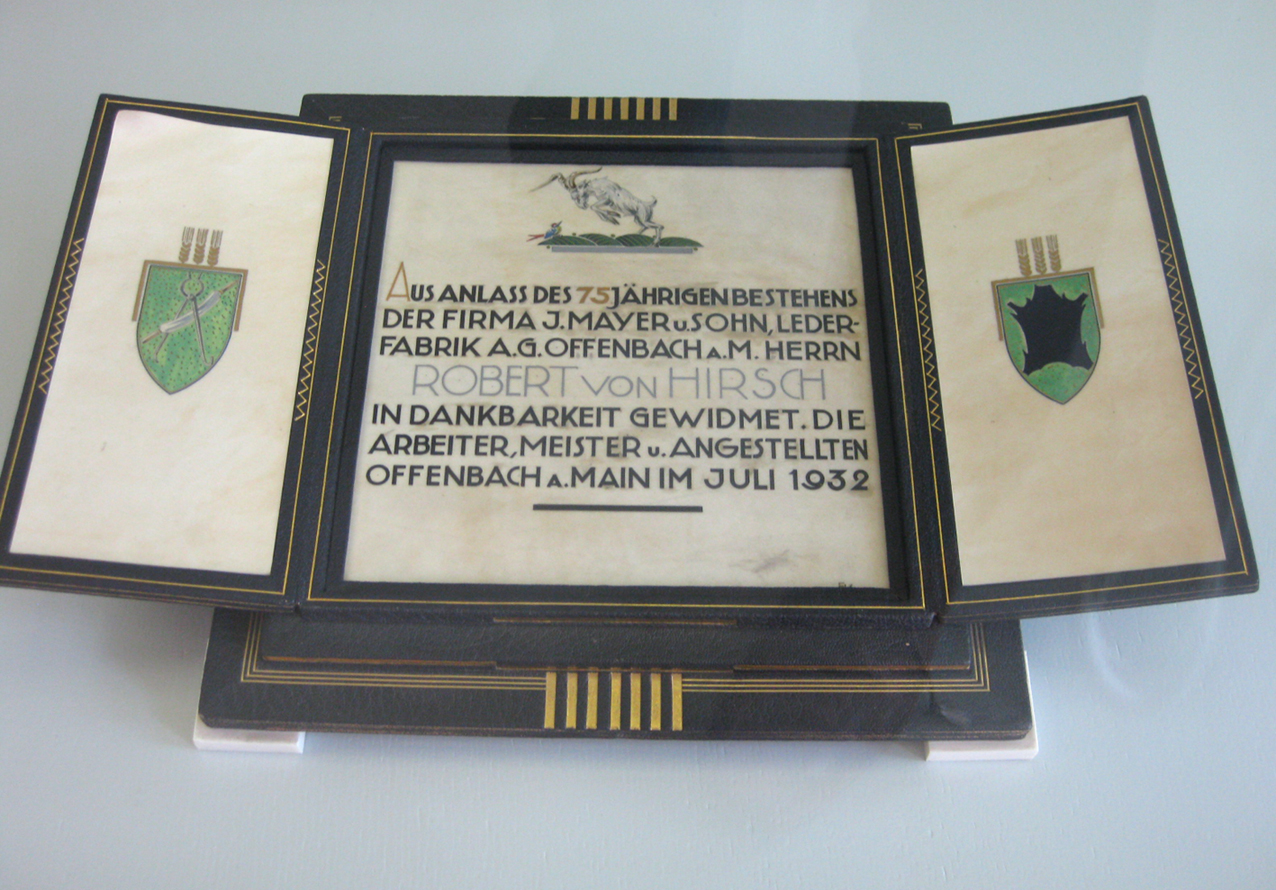
Gift der Angestellten der Lederwarenfirma an Robert von Hirsch

In 1898, Hirsch joined the leather factory Mayer & Feistmann (later J. Mayer & Sohn) in Luisenstraße, which was founded on 15 July 1857 in Offenbach am Main and belonged to his uncle, the Kommerzienrat Ludo Mayer, where he became a partner in 1906. A meeting with Grand Duke Ernst Ludwig of Hesse-Darmstadt at the inauguration of a company building in Offenbach led to Hirsch's elevation to the nobility of the Grand Duke of Hesse in 1913, an honor that was originally intended for Ludo Mayer. After his uncle's death in 1917, he continued to run the company alone.

As a Frankfurter, Hirsch served in the First World War as a royal Prussian lieutenant in the Landwehr cavalry.

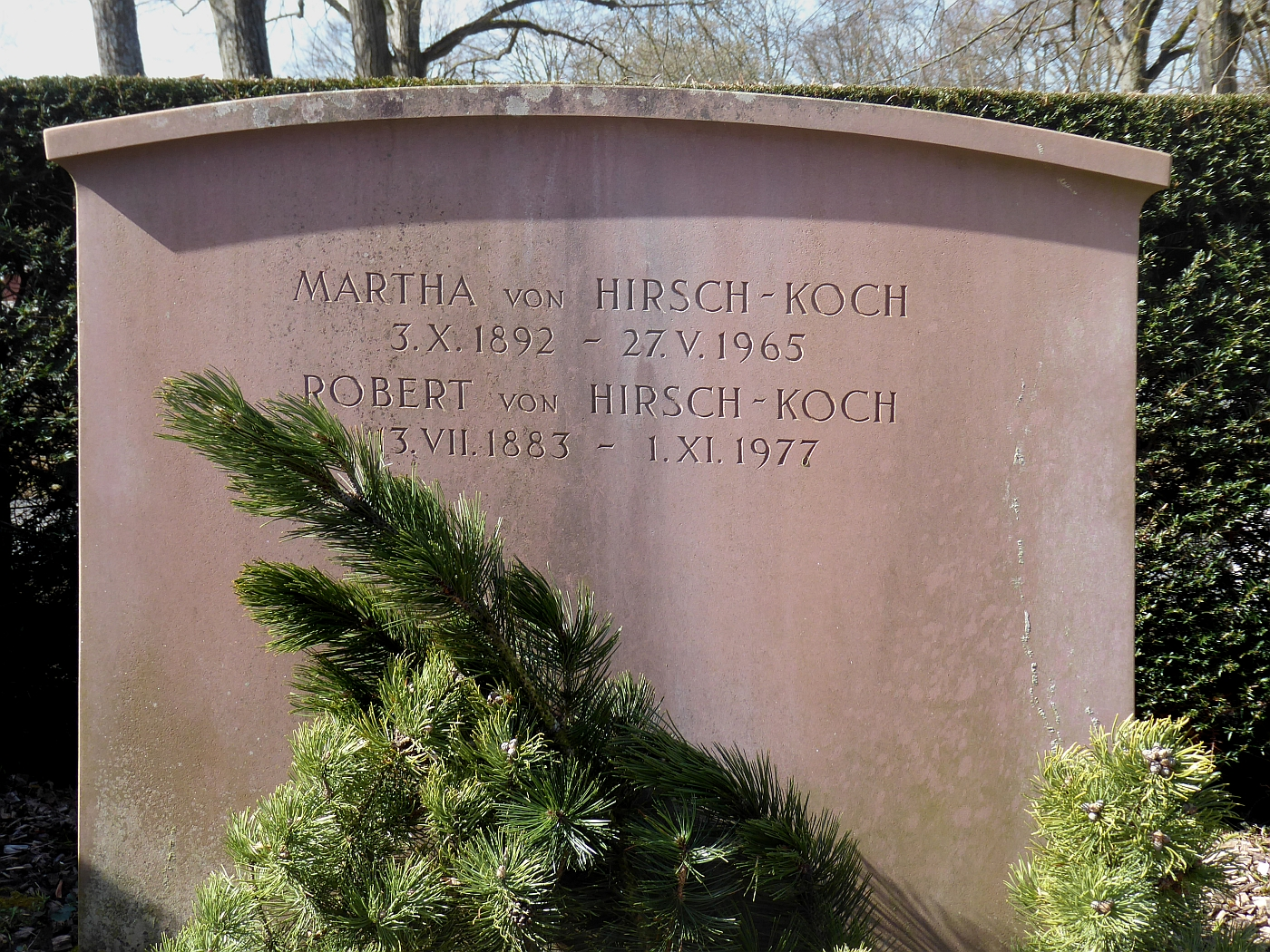
Grave at Friedhof am Hörnli, Riehen, Kanton Basel-Stadt, Schweiz

== Art collection and philanthropy ==
Hirsch trained as a self-taught art expert alongside his entrepreneurial activities and began to build up an art collection at the age of just 24 (1907),[1] which he expanded considerably between 1920 and 1933 with the help of Städel director Georg Swarzenski. The focus of his collection was on medieval and Renaissance art. However, he also purchased historical furniture, everyday objects, carpets and tapestries as well as works of art from the 20th century. He was appointed administrator of the Städel in Frankfurt at an early stage and thus belonged to a circle of young art collectors who donated important works of art to the museum. Hirsch's most famous donation was the painting Flowers and Ceramics (fleurs et ceramique, 1913) by Henri Matisse.

In 1927, Hirsch commissioned a villa in Frankfurt's Westend from the architect Anton Eyssen; the building at Friedrichstrasse 64 was demolished in June 2010 after 83 years.

== Nazi era ==
In 1933, Hirsch left Nazi Germany and emigrated to Basel in Switzerland, where his company already had a branch. He managed to take art with him and even expanded it further in exile. To obtain the right to export his collection he gifted Lucas Cranach's masterpiece Judgment of Paris to Hermann Göring. His brother, Karl, was arrested during the Nazi antisemitic pogrom known as Kristallnacht in 1938, and Hirsch tried to pay a ransom of 500,000 Swiss francs to obtain his brother's freedom, but he died of his injuries. He also helped the art historian Adolph Goldschmidt to flee to Basel in April 1939.

Hirsch became a Swiss citizen in 1940 and married the sculptor Martha Dreyfus-Koch (1892–1965), a childhood acquaintance and daughter of the Frankfurt jeweler Louis Koch, in 1945. The couple lived in a villa built in 1888 in the Louis XIII style in the middle of a large garden on Engelgasse, which also housed his collection of mainly medieval and Renaissance art in a Petersburg hanging.

== Postwar ==
He donated important works from his collection to Basel museums . In 1955, he was awarded an honorary doctorate from the University of Basel. Hirsch was of the opinion that public museums should only collect canonized art. The acquisition policy of the museums of the city of Basel under their directors Arnold Rüdlinger and Franz Meyer, who favored contemporary, not yet established, American art, led to dissent and caused the childless Hirsch to abandon his plan to donate the entire collection to the city of Basel after his death.In his will, he stipulated that his collection should be broken up, some works should go to museums, but the majority should be auctioned. This took place over eight auction days in June 1978 at Sotheby's in London. In the spring of 1978, the works were shown once again at the Städel and the Kunsthaus Zürich, ranging from gold-ground paintings, decorative arts and medieval furniture to Impressionist works. It brought in 18.4 million pounds (DM 78 million at the time). With the help of the Federal Republic of Germany and under the coordination of Josef Abs, twelve German museums acquired valuable works from the collection. “The most expensive piece in the auction, at 4.6 million marks, an enamel medallion of a personification “Operatio” from the Remaklus retable of the Stablo monastery from the middle of the 12th century ... went to the Kunstgewerbemuseum Berlin, an armilla from the circle of Friedrich Barbarossa to the Germanisches Nationalmuseum Nürnberg, and the important Dürer watercolor “Trintperg” to the Kunsthalle Bremen." Hirsch did not set foot on German soil again after 1933.

Auswahl der 1978 versteigerten Werke der Sammlung Robert von Hirsch
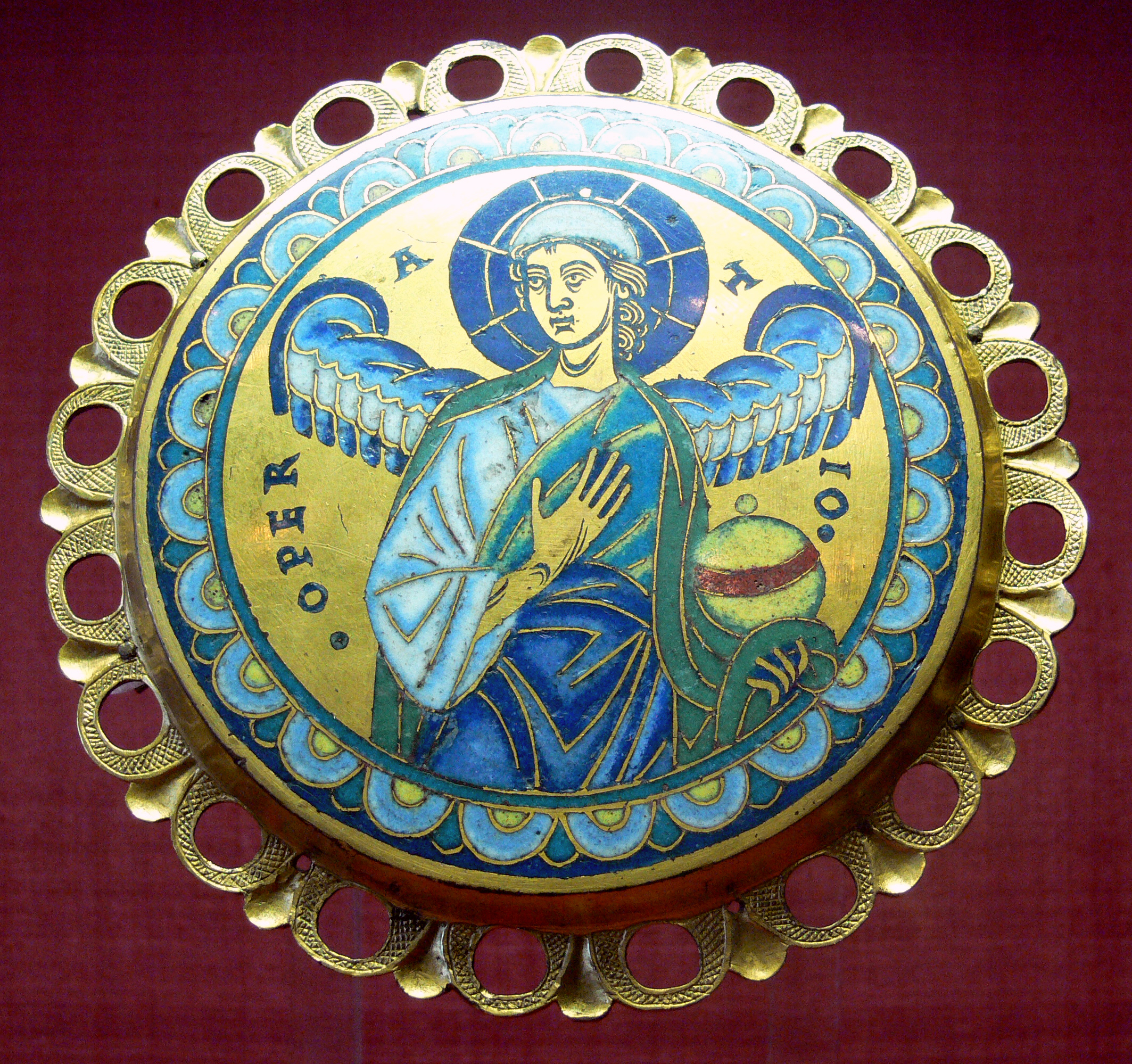
Emaille-Medaillon mit Personifikation „Operatio“

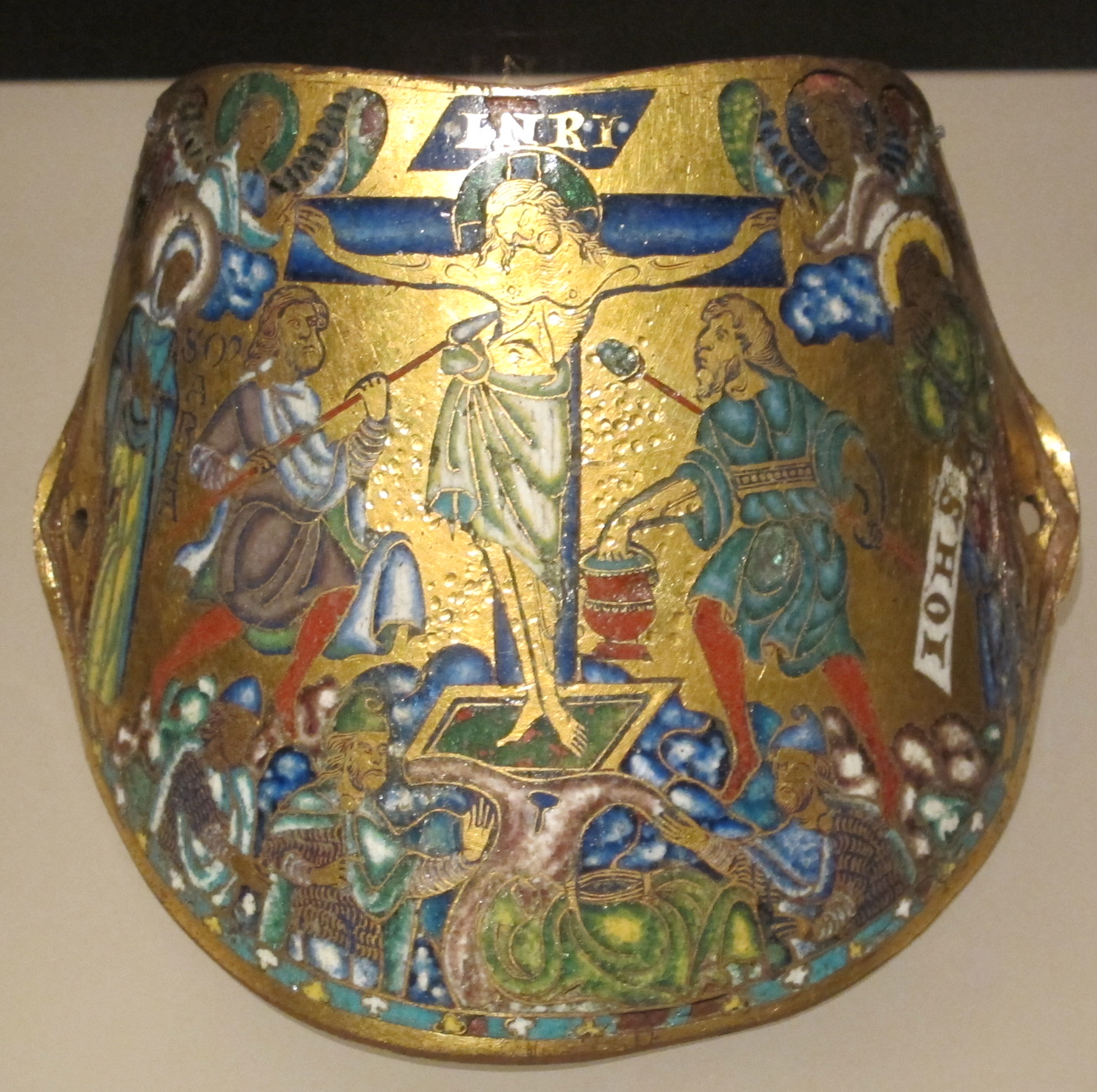
Prunkarmilla

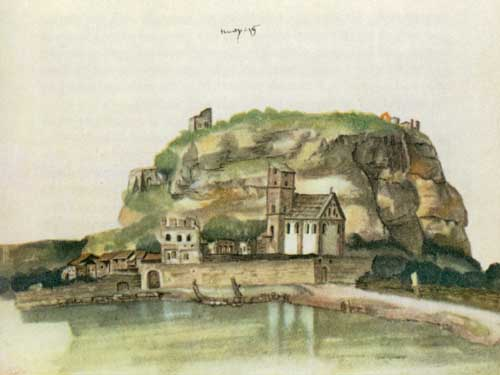
Aquarell „Trintperg“ von Albrecht Dürer

Hirsch supported charitable and cultural institutions, particularly the German Leather Museum in Offenbach, with foundations and donations.

His brother Paul Hirsch had taken over his father's ironmongery and was also an important collector. His grandniece, the writer Silvia Tennenbaum, portrayed Robert von Hirsch as the literary figure of the banker and art collector Eduard Wertheim in her novel “Streets of Yesterday” (1983)[1].

== Awards ==
- Erhebung in den großherzoglich hessischen Adelsstand (1913).
- Ehrensenator der TH Darmstadt.
- Ehrendoktorwürde der Universität Basel (1955).
