= Australian and New Zealand Association of Antiquarian Booksellers =

Organization of booksellers in Australia

The Australian and New Zealand Association of Antiquarian Booksellers (ANZAAB), formed in 1977, is the professional body which represents the members of the antiquarian book business in Australia and New Zealand.

It aims to promote the standing, welfare, and growth of the local antiquarian book business. It seeks to encourage the observance of courtesies and honorable practices traditionally associated with the trade between its members, and to discourage practices capable of bringing disrepute to antiquarian bookselling. In particular, the ANZAAB seeks to encourage its members to achieve high standards of accuracy in descriptions of materials offered for sale.

Booksellers who have, for a certain number of years, been engaged full-time in the buying and selling of old or secondhand books of some worth or consequence, and who are recognised for their expertise and good name, can become members.

Like many national associations, ANZAAB is affiliated with the International League of Antiquarian Booksellers. Like other national associations, it sets out standards of commercial behaviour to which its members voluntarily adhere.

== See also ==
- List of booksellers associations
