= Danish Antiquarian Booksellers Association =

The Danish Antiquarian Booksellers' Association (Danish: Den Danske Antikvarboghandlerforening ABF) is a Danish organization of professional antiquarian booksellers. It is the oldest league of antiquarian booksellers in Scandinavia as well as one of the oldest of its kind in the world, only preceded by the English ABA and the French SLAM. The purpose of the association is to standardize the descriptions of books, preserve and develop the trade, and represent the trade to the public. All ABF members are bound to adhere to the ILAB Code of Ethics.

== History ==
Since the middle of the 19th century, the Danish antiquarian book-trade had grown considerably, and became a fairly large trade with a great deal of buying and selling. 1920 marked a turning point for the trade, as it had been decided that the second-hand and pawnbroker law be renewed, expanding to comprise the used book trade. The intended law would mean that the antiquarian booksellers would have to register every single book that was bought, and many thought that this would mean the end of the trade; it would simply be impossible to register every single thing that was bought in a trade in which most of the buying was done in form of larger collections. Three antiquarian book dealers, Carl Frederiksen, Martin Jarler and A.L.E.V. Ørnø, agreed to meet on December 16, 1920; on this meeting the Danish Antiquarian Bookseller's Association was grounded.

During the meeting a committee was formed consisting of the three hosts as well as Grandsgaard-Christensen and V.J. Jensen from Johan Rasmussen's antiquarian bookshop. Carl Frederiksen was president of the committee; he negotiated with the Minister of Justice, Svenning Rytter, and the crucial paragraph was finally decided not to form part of the law. As a result of the meeting J.P. Madsen Lind suggested forming an association for antiquarian booksellers, which was unanimously agreed upon. Martin Jarler was elected the first president, and in 1924 he was succeeded by J.P. Madsen Lind. At the end of the year the association consisted of 27 members.

== See also ==
- List of booksellers associations
