= Syndicat National de la Librairie Ancienne et Moderne =

Syndicat National de la Librairie Ancienne et Moderne (SLAM), the national antiquarian book association of France, was created in 1914.

Its primary objective is to make the public aware of the world of antique books. It is the sole representative of the antique book trade in France, and as such plays an active part in maintaining relations with the public administration as well as with private organisations and bookdealers. Its activities are equally directed towards the promotion of the book trade and improving public knowledge of rare books.

SLAM includes about 225 book, autograph and print dealers, whose knowledge and professionalism are vouched for by strict admission rules. Consequently, they are experts in their fields, and are devoted to the transmission of knowledge and to the preservation of culture.

SLAM organises each year in Paris an elegant International Bookfair (the FILA) which attracts about 100 dealers from all over the world. Since 1998, the SLAM has been awarding a yearly Bibliography Prize.

== See also ==
- List of booksellers associations
- Books in France
