= A.S.W. Rosenbach Lectures in Bibliography =

Lectureship at the University of Pennsylvania

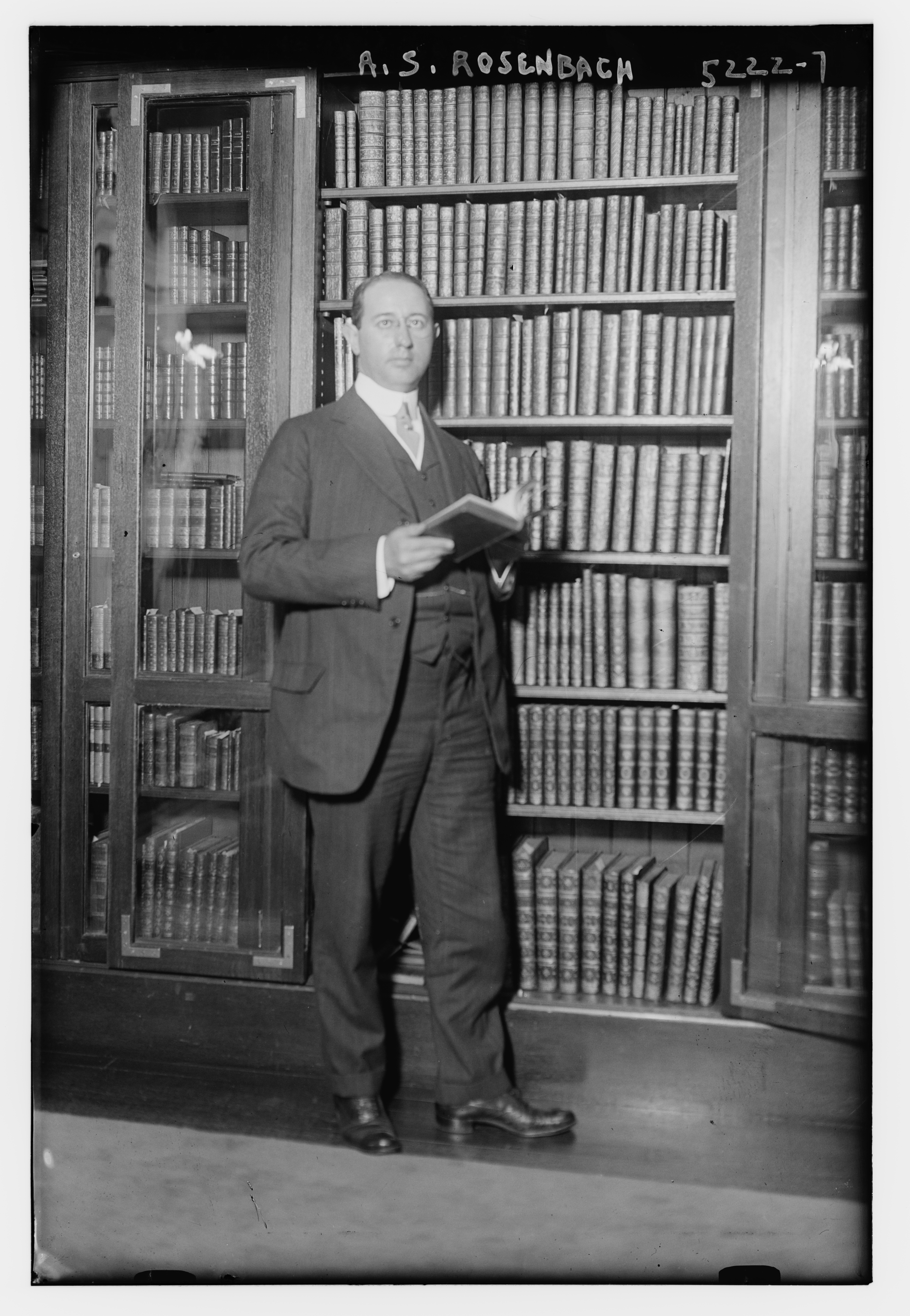
A.S.W. Rosenbach, a collector, scholar, and dealer in rare books

The A.S.W. Rosenbach Lectures are an endowed lectureship in bibliography established in 1928 by rare-book and manuscript dealer A. S. W. Rosenbach at the University of Pennsylvania.

The Rosenbach Lectures are the longest continuing series of bibliographical lectureships in the United States. Individuals appointed as Rosenbach Fellows present three lectures over several weeks.

The 1971 A.S.W. Rosenbach Fellowship in Bibliography marked the Theodore Dreiser Centenary.

The 1974 A.S.W. Rosenbach Fellowship in Bibliography was devoted to the fifth annual meeting of the American Society for Eighteenth-Century Studies."

The university's Van Pelt-Dietrich Library Center in collaboration with their Kislak Center for Special Collections, Rare Books and Manuscripts are the current location of the lectures.

== Lecturers ==
The first Rosenbach Fellow was Christopher Morley in 1931 whose lectures were published as Ex Libris Carissimis in 1932. Many of the lectures have been published by the University of Pennsylvania Press, including Morley's, which was also part of the anniversary collection of the Press. Other lecturers have included:

- Randolph Greenfield Adams, "Three Americanists"
- Claude C. Albritton, "Toward the Discovery of Time: Landmarks in Historical Geology"
- Nicolas Barker, "Things Not Reveal 'd: The Mutual Impact of Idea and Form in the Transmission of Poetry, 1500-2002"
- Malachi Beit-Arié, "Unveiled Faces of Medieval Hebrew Books: The Evolution of Manuscript Production"
- Terry Belanger, "The History of American Rare Book Libraries from 1876 to present"
- John Bidwell, "Papermaking in the Delaware Valley at the end of the 18th & beginning of the 19th century."
- Ann M. Blair, "Hidden Hands: Amanuenses and Authorship in Early Modern Europe."
- Fredson Bowers, "On Editing Shakespeare & the Elizabethan Dramatists"
- Clarence S. Brigham, "Journals & Journeymen: Studies in Early American Newspapers"
- Curt F. Bühler, "Incunabula" and "The 15th Century Book"
- Charles Burnett, "Arabic and Greek Science and Philosophy: Form and Style in the Transmission to the Latin West"
- Cass Canfield, "The Publishing Experience"
- Mary Carruthers, "Cognitive Geometries: Using Diagrams in the Middle Ages"
- William Charvat, "Literary Publishing in America 1790-1850"
- Roger Chartier, "Forms and Meanings: Texts, Performances, and Audiences from Codex to Computer"
- I. Bernard Cohen, "Words, Images & Ideas"
- Robert Darnton, "The Devil in the Holy Water"
- Elizabeth Eisenstein, "Divine Art / Infernal Machine: Western Views of Printing Surveyed"
- Robert H. Elias, "Dreiser: Bibliography and the Biographer"
- Bernhard Fabian, "Literacy & the Reading Public in the 18th century"
- John Farquhar Fulton, "Great Medical Bibliographies: A study in Humanism"
- Carlo Ginzberg, "Fossils, Apes, Humans: A Chapter in the History of Science, Revisited"
- Anthony Grafton, "Books and the Magus: Johannes Trithemius 1462-1516"
- James N. Green, "Book Publishing in Early America"
- David D. Hall, "Pen and Press: Practices of Writing and Publishing in Colonial America"
- Louis Hanke, "Bartolomi de Las Casas"
- Anthony Hobson, "The Bibliomania: English Book Collecting in the Early Nineteenth Century"
- Dard Hunter, "Oriental Papermaking, Early American Papermaking"
- Joan Judge,"Chinese Common Readers: Toward an Understanding of Vernacular Literacy."
- Matthew G. Kirschenbaum, "Bitstreams: The Future of Digital Literary Heritage"
- Ludolf Kuchenbuch and Ivan Illich, "The History of Text: Three Dialogues"
- John Lievsay, "The Englishman 's Italian Books"
- Alberto Manguel, "The Traveller, the Tower and the Worm"
- Peter D. McDonald, "The Secret Life of Books"
- James Gilmer McManaway, "Early English Literature"
- Elizabeth McHenry, "Toward a History of Black Print"
- A. Hyatt Mayor, "Prints & People"
- Wolfgang Milde, "The Gospel of Henry the Lion"
- C. William Miller, "From Holy Experiment to Revolution"
- Dorothy Miner, "The Medieval Illustrated Book"
- Ruth Mortimer, "L 'Art de Bien Batir: French 16th Century Architecture Books"
- Paul Needham, "The First Quarter Century of European Printing."
- A. Edward Newton, "Bibliography & Pseudo-Bibliography"
- Stanley Pargellis, "Americana Collectors in Europe and England, 1600-1800"
- Nicholas Pickwood, "The Uses of Bookbinding History"
- Donald Pizer, "Dreiser 's Fiction: The Editorial Problem"
- J. H. Powell, "The USA 1774-1816: A Bibliographical Study"
- Leah Price, "Reading from Home.Reader ≠ inessential worker"
- Janice Radway, "Books, Reading and the Struggle for Control of Literary Culture in the Age of Mass Production"
- Richard H. Rouse, "The Development of Aids to Study in the 13th Century"
- Paul Henry Saenger, "The Latin Bible as Codex"
- George Sarton, "The Appreciation of Ancient and Medieval Science "in the Renaissance
- Fred Schreiber, "The French-Scholar Printer of the Renaissance"
- Leslie Shane, "Swift, Irish Books"
- Peter Stallybrass, "Printing-for-Manuscript"
- Brain Stock, "Minds, Bodies, Readers"
- Michael F. Suarez, S.J. "Printing Abolition:How the Fight to Ban the British Slave Trade Was Won, 1783–1807"
- G. Thomas Tanselle, "Tortured Stem and Tranquil Blossom: A Rationale of Textual Criticism"
- Archer Taylor, "Subject Indexes"
- Eric Gardner Turner, "Towards a Typology of the Early Codex"
- Robert W. G. Vail, "Voice of the Old Frontier"
- Michael Warner, "The Evangelical Public Sphere"
- James L. W. West III, "The Profession of Authorship in America 1900-1950"
- Roy McKeen Wilies
- George Parker Winship, "John Gutenberg, 15th Century Printing, The Bay Psalm Book"
- Kelly Wisecup."Indigenous Ecologies of the Page: Bibliography, Birchbark, and Remediation."
- Edwin Wolf II, "Books and Bookmen of Colonial Philadelphia"
- Richard J. Wolfe, "The Art of Marbling Paper & its relationship to Bookbinding in the West"
- Louis Booker Wright, "Living Libraries"
- Lawrence C. Wroth, "An American Bookshelf in 1755"
- John Cook Wyllie, "Typefaces used in Books"
- William Zachs, "Authenticity and Duplicity: Investigations into Multiple Copies of Books"

== See also ==
- E. A. Lowe Lectures
- Lyell Lectures
- McKenzie Lectures
- Panizzi Lectures
- Sandars Lectures
