= Terry Belanger =

American librarian (born 1941)

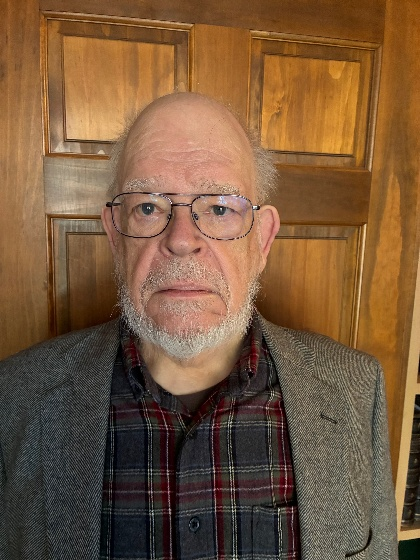
- Terry Belanger
- Born: 1941 (age 84–85)
- Education: Haverford College; Columbia University
- Occupation: University Professor Emeritus (University of Virginia)
- Known for: Founder of Rare Book School
- Awards: American Printing History Association Individual Award (1994); MacArthur Fellow (2005)

Terry Belanger is the founding director of Rare Book School (RBS), an institute concerned with education for the history of books and printing, and with rare books and special collections librarianship. He is University Professor Emeritus at the University of Virginia (UVa), where RBS has its home base. Between 1972 and 1992, he devised and ran a master's program for the training of rare book librarians and antiquarian booksellers at the Columbia University School of Library Service. He is a 2005 MacArthur Fellow.

== Education and early work ==
Born in 1941, Belanger attended public schools in Bristol, Connecticut. He has degrees from Haverford College (A.B., 1963) and from Columbia University (M.A., 1964; Ph.D., 1970), where he studied under James L. Clifford, Allen T. Hazen, and John H. Middendorf. Between 1966 and 1971, while working on his dissertation on aspects of the 18th-century London book trade, he taught advanced prose composition courses at the Columbia University School of General Studies, an activity leading to the 1972 publication of The Art of Persuasion, a writing manual co-authored with J. Steward LaCasce. While in England on a Columbia traveling fellowship in 1968–69, he revised the book production sections of the 18th-century volume of the New Cambridge Bibliography of English Literature (NCBEL), working with Graham Pollard, who had compiled the original sections for the first edition of CBEL, published in 1940. With Jane Marla Robbins, he co-authored and co-directed a one-character play starring Robbins called Dear Nobody, based on the life of the 18th-century diarist and novelist, Fanny Burney. The play ran Off-Off-Broadway in 1968; it later had a five-months' Off-Broadway run at the Cherry Lane Theatre in 1974.

== The rare book program at Columbia ==
In 1972, Richard L. Darling, the dean of Columbia's School of Library Service (SLS), invited Belanger to develop a master's program for the training of rare book and special collections librarians, a brief soon expanded to include the antiquarian book trade. The program's laboratory, the Book Arts Press, provided a space where students could set type and print the result on a hand press; make relief cuts, drypoints, and etchings; and otherwise get their hands dirty in the interest of their bibliographical educations. The program, the first of its kind, put a heavy emphasis on books as physical objects, and it stimulated the development of rare book librarianship as a profession; graduates of the Columbia rare book program currently occupy many of the senior positions in the field. In 1983, Belanger founded Rare Book School, a collection of five-day non-credit courses on subjects relating to the history of the book and rare book librarianship, expanding the educational opportunities he had developed within the Columbia master's program and making them available both to working professionals—teaching academics, rare book librarians, archivists, antiquarian booksellers, conservators and binders—and to those with an avocational interest in the subjects treated. In 1989, he began to compile an address book listing the names of the Friends of the Book Arts Press, RBS participants, and others with rare book connections or interests (the 10th, 352-page edition of the Book Arts Press Address Book was published in 2008).

== The move to UVa ==
Belanger moved both the Book Arts Press and RBS to the University of Virginia (UVa) in 1992, where he accepted an appointment as University Professor and Honorary Curator of Special Collections. At UVa, Belanger taught undergraduate courses on the history of the book in the history, English, and art departments and in the School of Engineering and Applied Science. In 1996, he established a program in which UVa undergraduates came up with the idea for a book exhibition, researched the subject, wrote captions, and mounted the result in the Dome Room of the Rotunda, the principal room of the university. Student had considerable independence in how they constructed their exhibitions, whose subjects ranged from Armed Services Editions to Thomas Jefferson and Monticello ephemera. Belanger continued to organize and host a series of public lectures begun at Columbia on bookish subjects, including an annual lecture honoring Sol. M. and Mary Ann O'Brian Malkin; the 500th lecture in the series was given at UVa in 2007.

Belanger retired in 2009; he was succeeded as director of RBS by Michael F. Suarez, S.J. He continues to teach courses in the identification of book illustration processes 1450–1900 at RBS, and he remains on the faculty of the Colorado Antiquarian Book Seminar, where he teaches descriptive bibliography and basic conservation/preservation techniques. In 2012, he worked with the New York City book collector Florence Fearrington on an exhibition on the history of the cabinet of curiosities opening at the Grolier Club in December entitled "Rooms of Wonder: From Wunderkammer to Museum, 1599-1899," writing much of the label copy and the accompanying exhibition catalog. The exhibition received extensive press coverage, including a review in The Wall Street Journal and a full-page review by Roberta Smith in The New York Times, who noted that "it is rare to see such a dense and illuminating treatment of the cabinets’ proliferation, popularity and evolution, and fascinating that it can be done so well through a display limited to their bibliographic byproducts."

== Lectures ==
- A.S.W. Rosenbach Lectures in Bibliography University of Pennsylvania (1986)
- Graham Pollard Lecture of the Bibliographical Society (1988)
- Hanes Lecture at the University of North Carolina (1991)
- Malkin Lecture at Columbia University (1991),
- Brownell Lecture at the University of Iowa (1994)
- Adler Lecture at Skidmore College (1996)
- Mayo Lecture at Texas A & M University (2003)
- inaugural lecture in the Fondren Library Distinguished Lecture Series at Rice University (2004),
- Swartzburg Lecture at Wells College (2007), *
- McCusker Lecture at Dominican University (2008)
- inaugural Joan Friedman Lecture in Book History at the University of Illinois at Urbana-Champaign (2010).

He has also given about two hundred other formal presentations on bibliographical and bibliophilic subjects over the past 40 years. In 2009, he gave the annual addresses of the Bibliographical Society of America in January, and of the Bibliographical Society of the University of Virginia in March.

== Awards ==
- 1994 – American Printing History Association Individual Award
- 2005 – MacArthur Fellow

== Works ==
- J. Steward LaCasce and Terry Belanger, The Art of Persuasion: How to Write Effectively about Almost Anything. New York: Charles Scribner's Sons, 1972.
- "Descriptive Bibliography", BookCollecting: A Modern Guide Jean Peters, ed. (New York and London: R. R. Bowker, 1977), 97-101.
- Richard L. Darling and Terry Belanger. Extended Library Education Programs: Proceedings of a Conference Held at the School of Library Service, Columbia University, 13–14 March 1980. New York: Columbia University School of Library Service, 1980.
- The ALA glossary of library and information science, Editors Heartsill Young, Terry Belanger, Ediciones Díaz de Santos, 1983, ISBN 978-0-8389-0371-1.
- Terry Belanger, ed. Proceedings of the Fine Printing Conference at Columbia University Held May 19–22, 1982. New York: Columbia University School of Library Service, 1983.
- Lunacy & the Arrangement of books, New Castle, Del.: Oak Knoll Books, 1983; 3rd ptg 2003, ISBN 978-1-58456-099-9.
- Editor/compiler of the Book Arts Press Address Book: published by the Book Arts Press at Columbia University (1989–91) and at the University of Virginia (1993–2008).
- Editor/compiler of the Rare Book School Yearbook (1989–99).
- The Anatomy of a Book: I: Format in the Hand-Press Period (30-minute videotape). Author and co-producer (with Peter Herdrich). New York: Viking Productions, Inc. 1991. Reformatted and released by RBS as a DVD, 2003.
- Dancing by the Book: a Catalogue of Books 1531-1804 in the Collection of Mary Ann O’Brian Malkin. With Mary Ann O’Brian Malkin, Moira Goff, Richard Noble, and Jennifer Thorp. New York City: Privately Printed, 2003.
