= American Printing History Association =

American organization for the study of printing history

- Abbreviation: APHA
- Formation: 1974; 52 years ago
- Founders: J. Ben Lieberman, Catherine T. Brody, Joseph R. Dunlap, Stuart C. Dobson, Paul Noble, Robert Leslie, Herbert H. Johnson, Elizabeth M. Harris, Philip Grushkin, Martin K. Speckter, Terry Belanger, Jean Peters, Stephen O. Saxe, and Susan O. Thompson
- Type: Nonprofit historical society
- Tax ID no.: 23-7441237 (EIN)
- Legal status: 501(c)(3) organization
- Location: New York, NY, U.S.
- Affiliations: American Historical Association
- Website: printinghistory.org

The American Printing History Association (APHA) is a "scholarly, educational, and charitable organization fostering the study of printing history (especially American) and the book arts. It was established in 1974.

== History ==
The American Printing History Association issued a printed newsletter for members six times per year beginning in 1974. National business meetings were held and the first annual program took place in October 1976 at Columbia University in the Harkness Theater. The theme was "Typographic America: A Bicentennial Perspective."

The Conference speakers in 1976 included Hellmut Lehmann-Haupt, John Tebbel, Leona Rostenberg, Madeleine Stern and Terry Belanger.

Annual conferences have been held each year since 1976. From 1976 to 1987 these were held in connection with Columbia University, but in later years at a variety of locations including the Library Company of Philadelphia (1988), Harvard University (1989), the Library of Congress (1991), Harry Ransom Center at the University of Texas at Austin (1997), Newberry Library (1998), UCLA Library and Getty Research Institute (2007), and the Huntington Library (2016).

The 50th annual conference is “Enduring Impressions: Private Presses & Their Legacies,” in San Francisco from October 23–25, 2025.

In 1987 the APHA became an affiliate of the American Historical Association.

== Publications ==
Printing History is the semi-annual peer-reviewed journal of the American Printing History Association. It began in 1979. The scope of the periodical is 'printing' taken to mean the book arts in general.

The APHA Newsletter was published from 1974 to 2013 featuring accounts of APHA activities, announcements, regional chapter reports and news items. of interest to members. In 2013 this content moved to the APHA website.

Fit to Print, a PDF newsletter, that is emailed to members was launched in January 2024.

== Lieberman Lecture ==
The annual Lieberman Lecture sponsored by the APHA commemorates J. Ben Lieberman, founder and first president of the American Printing History Association. It was established in 1986 and the first lecture was given by Claire Van Vliet.

== Mark Samuels Lasner Fellows ==
The Mark Samuels Lasner Fellowship in Printing History was established in 2002. It provides research support for study of the history of printing in all its forms, including all the arts and technologies relevant to printing, the book arts, and letterforms.

== Awards ==
In 1976 the APHA established an award "for a distinguished contribution to the study, recording, preservation or dissemination of printing history, in any specific area or in general terms."

In 1985 a second award was established for institutional achievement.

== Archives ==
The record and archives of the APHA are held at Columbia University.
