= Mary Ann O'Brian Malkin =

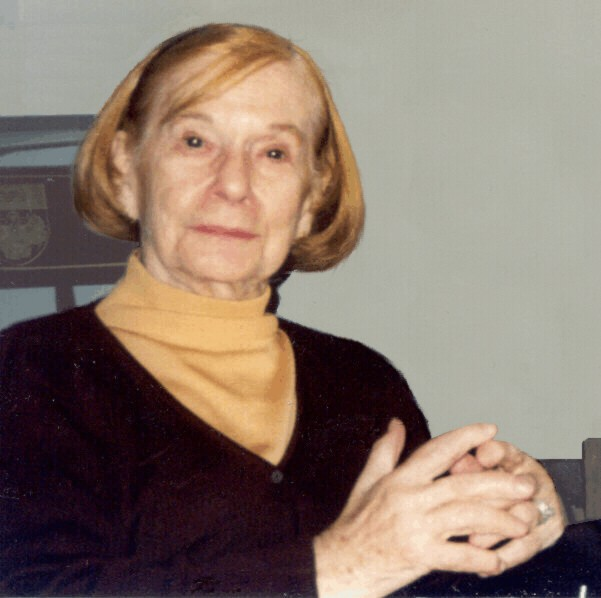
- Malkin in the 2000s
- Born: March 13, 1913; Altoona, Pennsylvania, U.S.
- Died: August 1, 2005 (aged 92); New York City, New York, U.S.
- Education: Pennsylvania State University
- Occupation: Editor
- Known for: Book collecting; philanthropy
- Spouse: Donald Woodward Lee

Mary Ann (née O'Brian) Malkin (March 13, 1913 – August 1, 2005) was an American editor and dance notator.

She collected books on dance notation, the shorthand used by choreographers to make detailed records of their work. Especially strong in 18th-century European material, her collection, given to Penn State in 2003, was the best in private hands.

== Career ==
Malkin was born March 13, 1913, in Altoona, Pennsylvania, the daughter of Agnes (née Lynch) and Lawrence O'Brian. Her father worked for the Pennsylvania Railroad.

A 1937 graduate of the Pennsylvania State University, she married Donald Woodward Lee, an instructor at Penn State, and the couple moved to New York City so that Lee could pursue a doctorate at Columbia University; this marriage ended in divorce.

While working at the R. R. Bowker Company in the mid-1940s, Malkin met Sol. M. Malkin, editor of the Antiquarian Bookman (AB). She purchased this weekly magazine from Bowker in 1953, by which time it had become a prime source for timely news, book reviews, and coverage of trade and library conventions.

It attracted a large subscription list of dealers, both those especially concerned with selling used books and those primarily engaged in the sale of new books but who ran an out-of-print search service for their customers. She worked for the magazine, which later renamed itself AB Bookman’s Weekly, as administrative assistant, copy editor and – as "Grandma Lynch" – a features writer, posing as a book collector who lived in the mountains of Frugality, Pennsylvania, and who kept her books in caves (good humidity) with bear traps in front of each cave (inexpensive security).

O'Brian married Sol. Malkin in 1953. She was a frequent book reviewer in AB especially of needlepoint and cook books (AB 's readers got quite accustomed to these reviews, madly irrelevant though they were to the concerns of most of the magazine's subscribers). She signed her reviews with her initials, MAM – and it was as MAM that she was known to her many friends in the book and dance worlds. Sol. Malkin sold the magazine in 1972; a year later, the Malkins were jointly awarded the Clarence Day Award of the American Library Association, an award annually made to a librarian or other individual for outstanding work in encouraging the love of books and reading. The Malkins were the first non-librarians to receive this honor.

== Philanthropy ==
In 1985, she established an annual lecture under the auspices of the Book Arts Press at Columbia University in honor of her husband Sol., who died in March 1986, a few months after Michael Winship gave the first lecture, "Hermann Ernst Ludewig: America’s Forgotten Bibliographer."

The Malkin lecture, later renamed the Sol. M. and Mary Ann O'Brian Malkin Lecture in Bibliography, moved with the Book Arts Press and Rare Book School (RBS) to the University of Virginia in 1992. MAM was a frequent attendee of RBS courses during the school's Columbia days, and a regular visitor to the school after its move to Charlottesville, Virginia.

From 1999 through 2004, MAM funded the New Scholars Program of the Bibliographical Society of America (BSA); each year the BSA invited three early-career scholars to present 20-minute papers at a panel preceding the annual meeting in New York City in late January. The program gave participants an opportunity to present unpublished research and to acquaint members of the Society with new work on bibliographical topics. After MAM's death, the BSA raised endowment funds to institutionalize her annual subsidy; one of the New Scholars grants is named in her honor.

Though never a professional dancer herself, she always had an interest in both contemporary ballroom dancing and the history of dance, and she was a supporter of many dance groups and societies, including the American Dance Guild (ADG).

In 2003, the ADG and Columbia University co-sponsored a Mary Ann Malkin Gala Concert of dance at the Peter Norton Symphony Space in New York City in honor of her generous support of dancing and dance history.

== Collecting Dance Books ==
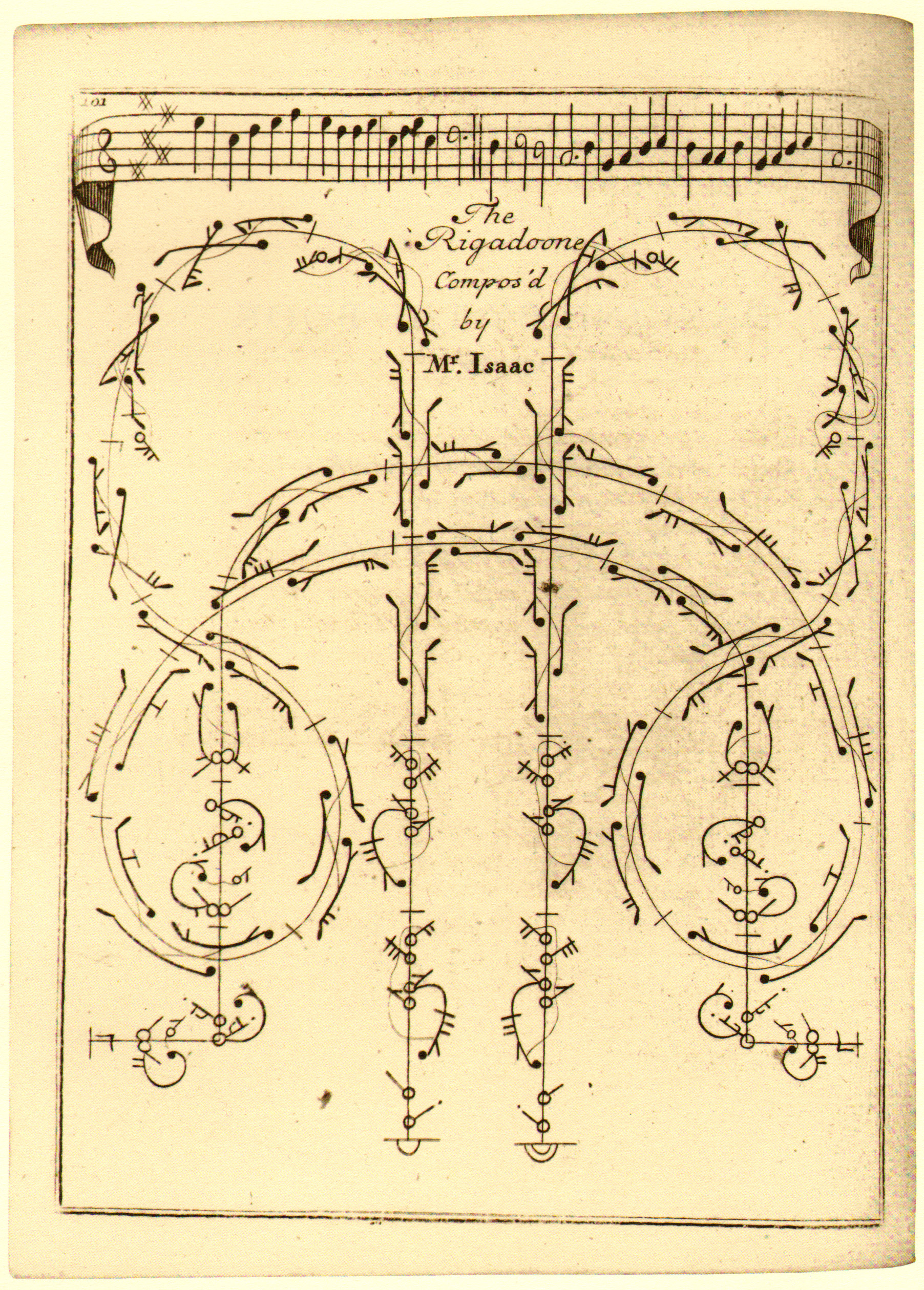
Chicken tracks: Feuillet system of dance notation (1721)

She began to collect dance books in the mid-1970s: "Neither Sol. nor I collected books seriously during our AB days", she wrote in recollections published in the newsletter of The Fellowship of American Bibliophilic Societies.

"Sol. felt deeply that it would have been unfair to our subscribers for us to do so." In the 1970s, MAM acquired an 18th-century book on the history of dance that used a visual shorthand system of dance step notation. "I had trouble reading this book: stenochoregraphic dance notation has an alarming resemblance to chicken tracks", she said, but she decided to collect books showing the history of dance notation as three-dimensional objects that could be loved for themselves, as well as for their contents.

She soon had a substantial collection of dance notation books, thanks in large part to English dealer Richard Macnutt, who represented her at the 1979 Jack Cole Sotheby's sale in London.

Other dealers who helped her form her collection include Bennett Gilbert, Gordon Hollis of Golden Legend, the Lubranos, Bruce McKittrick, the Sallochs, and Stephen Weissman. Some of MAM's dance books were exhibited at the Grolier Club in New York City in 1986 and at the Houghton Library at Harvard in 1987. She was the principal lender to Madison U. Sowell's 1993 exhibition at Brigham Young University, The Art of Terpsichore: From Renaissance Festivals to Romantic Ballets, mounted in conjunction with a meeting of the Society of Dance History Scholars.

In 2002, she mounted a solo show of her books at the Grolier Club and then gave her collection to her alma mater, Penn State, which mounted an exhibition of the books in October 2003. In 2003, she privately published the substantial Dancing by the Book, a catalog of her collection of dance notation books. She wrote in the preface: "We could have (and should have) done more — and worked longer and harder — before publishing this catalogue. But I am now 90 years old, and it seems an appropriate time to show the results of our work thus far."

Toward the end of her life, her eyesight began to fail, and she became unsure on her feet. She fell twice in 2004, breaking first one hip and then the other. Mentally she remained alert, however, and, with help from a home care worker, she graduated to a three-wheeled walker and then to a cane.

In July 2005, she took a train to Charlottesville to attend the 21st annual Sol. M. and Mary Ann O'Brian Malkin Lecture in Bibliography, given on July 27 by Richard Wendorf, then the Director of the Boston Athenæum, and to attend a dinner in her honor. She seemed tired but well when she returned to New York City on Friday, July 30, and in a telephone conversation on Sunday night she gave a lively account of her visit to RBS to a friend; but she died, aged 92, apparently in her sleep, later that evening.

There were no near surviving relatives. Her residual estate was divided between the Grolier Club and Rare Book School.
