= Christopher Lehmann-Haupt =

American journalist, editor, critic, and novelist (1934–2018)

- Born: June 14, 1934; Edinburgh, Scotland
- Died: November 7, 2018 (aged 84); New York City, U.S.
- Education: Swarthmore College; Yale School of Drama (MFA)
- Occupations: Journalist; editor; critic; novelist
- Spouse: Natalie Robins (m. 1969)
- Children: 2
- Parent(s): Hellmuth E. Lehmann-Haupt; Leticia Jane Hargrave Grierson

Christopher Lehmann-Haupt (June 14, 1934 – November 7, 2018) was an American journalist, editor of The New York Times Book Review, critic, and novelist, based in New York City. He served as senior Daily Book Reviewer from 1969 to 1995.

== Biography ==
Lehmann-Haupt was born on June 14, 1934, in Edinburgh, Scotland, while his parents were visiting his mother's family. He was the eldest of three sons of Leticia Jane Hargrave Grierson, a Scottish teacher and editor from Edinburgh, and Hellmut Otto Emil Lehmann-Haupt, a German-born graphic arts historian and bibliographer. His family lived in New York City. Christopher had two younger brothers, Carl and Alexander (a member of Ken Kesey's Merry Pranksters).

It was not until Lehmann-Haupt traveled to Berlin in 1947 to live with his father for a year that he learned about his father's Jewish ancestry. His parents had divorced, and his father had gone to Berlin in 1946 with the Allied Armies’ Monuments, Fine Arts and Archives section to help recover art works stolen by the Nazis and to revive German cultural life. In 1948 his father married again, to Rosemarie Mueller. They had two children, John and Roxana Lehmann-Haupt, half-siblings to Christopher and his brothers.

Lehmann-Haupt was educated at the Ethical Culture Fieldston School in New York, The Putney School in Vermont, and Swarthmore College. He did postgraduate work at the Yale School of Drama, from which he graduated in 1959 with a Master of Fine Arts degree in theater history and dramatic criticism.

In 1969, Lehmann-Haupt married writer Natalie Robins. They had two children together, Rachel and Noah, and lived in the Riverdale section of the Bronx.

Lehmann-Haupt died at Milstein Hospital in Manhattan on November 7, 2018, due to complications from a stroke.

== Career ==
Lehmann-Haupt first worked as a teacher in Middletown, New York, but moved to Manhattan to seek work in publishing. He worked as an editor for various New York City publishing houses, among them Holt, Rinehart and Winston and The Dial Press. In 1965, he moved to The New York Times Book Review, where he became an editor and critic. He became immersed in the books and issues of the day.

In May 1968, along with several dozen then-prominent writers and political activists (including James Baldwin, Jules Feiffer, Norman Mailer, Susan Sontag and Gloria Steinem), Lehmann-Haupt signed the "Violence in Oakland" essay published in the New York Review of Books. It condemned police harassment of and violence against Black Panther Party members in Oakland, California. A police attack on April 6, 1968, had resulted in their killing 17-year-old Bobby Hutton, and wounding leaders Eldridge Cleaver and another young African-American man. Each of the three was unarmed.

In 1969, Lehmann-Haupt was appointed senior Daily Book Reviewer for The New York Times. He held this position until 1995, when he became a regular daily book reviewer. From 1965 until 2000, he wrote more than 4,000 book reviews and articles, on fiction and on subjects from trout fishing to Persian archaeology.

Lehmann-Haupt taught and lectured widely. He wrote articles on a variety of subjects, including fly fishing and bluegrass banjo-picking, two of his occasional avocations.

He also published three books of his own, which were well-reviewed. The first, a memoir, Me and Joe DiMaggio: A Baseball Fan Goes in Search of His Gods, was published in 1986 by Simon & Schuster. His first novel, A Crooked Man, was published by Simon & Schuster in 1995. His second novel, The Mad Cook of Pymatuning was published by Simon & Schuster in 2005. At the time of his death, Lehmann-Haupt was working on a memoir of the year he spent living in Berlin with his father, from 1947 until 1948.

While editor of The New York Times Book Review, Lehmann-Haupt was known for being opposed to genre fiction. In 1980, when given a copy of Harlan Ellison's Shatterday for possible review, Lehmann-Haupt reportedly threw the book across the room and said, "Oh, it's that sci-fi crap."

In April 2000, he assumed the job of chief obituary writer for The Times. He wrote advance obituaries and occasional daily obituaries until his retirement on June 30, 2006. Obituaries bearing his byline continued to run in The New York Times as of January 2020. In retirement he continued to write advance obituaries as a freelancer for The New York Times.

During these years he also taught writing at the Marymount College Writing Center and College of Mount Saint Vincent in Riverdale, the Bronx, New York. He also taught at Columbia University's Graduate School of Journalism. He was appointed the editorial director of Delphinium Books, a literary small press that publishes works of fiction.
