= Brian Stock =

Brian Stock is the name of:

- Brian Stock (footballer), Welsh football player and manager
- Brian Stock (historian), American historian
