= Edwin Wolf II =

American librarian (1911–1991)

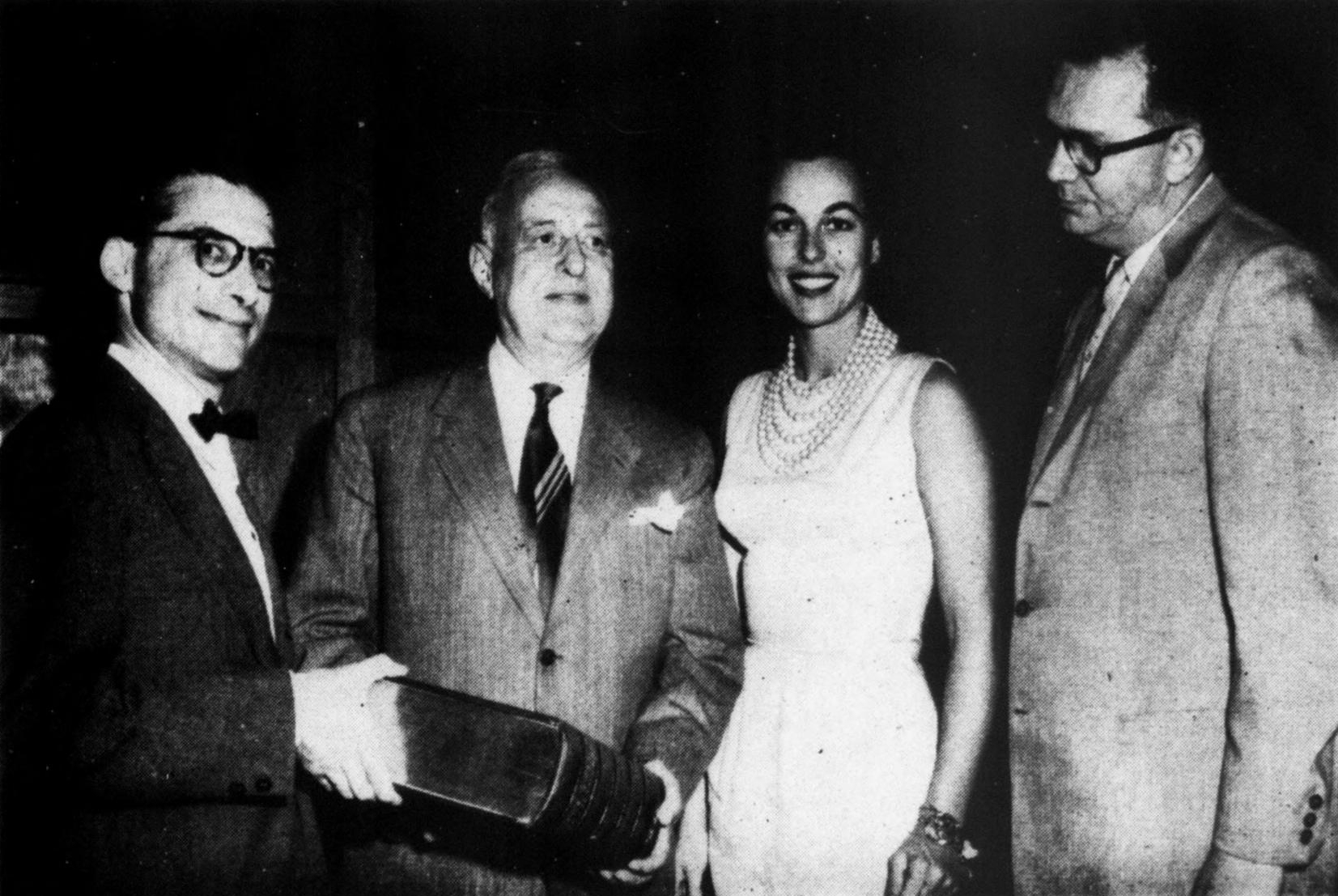
Wolf (far left), president of the Jewish Publication Society, presents a Family Bible to USNY Regent Roger Williams Straus Sr. (second from left) as TV actress Bess Myerson and JPS Executive Secretary Lesser Zussman look on c. 1957

Edwin Wolf II (December 6, 1911 – February 20, 1991) was an American librarian and collector who was one of Philadelphia’s most prominent bookmen during the 20th century.

== Biography ==
=== Education and career ===
Wolf attended the William Penn Charter School in Philadelphia then enrolled at the Bedales School in Hampshire, England.

He then returned to Philadelphia to work with A. S. W. Rosenbach, the bookseller and bibliophile who attained a worldwide reputation, at his rare book firm, the Rosenbach Company.

Wolf joined the United States Army during World War II (1943–1946), and was stationed in Europe where he participated in the recovery of ancient and rare books plundered and hidden by the Nazis. His training at Camp Ritchie's Military Intelligence Training Center places him among the ranks of nearly 20,000 other Ritchie Boys.

In 1952 Wolf joined the Library Company of Philadelphia as a consultant and advisor. Over the decades he was instrumental in morphing the Library Company into an active research library. He ultimately became Chief Executive Officer and was named Librarian of the Library Company.

He established a reputation as a scholar, published numerous articles and exhibition catalogues, and fostered collaborative projects with other Philadelphia historical institutions, including the Historical Society of Pennsylvania and the American Philosophical Society. He became President of the Friends of the University of Pennsylvania Library in 1947.

He gave the A.S.W. Rosenbach Lectures in Bibliography in 1963.

He was President of the Bibliographical Society of America from 1966-1967.

He was the Lyell Lecturer in Bibliography in 1985-1986 and the augmented lectures were published as The Book Culture of a Colonial American City: Philadelphia Books, Bookmen, and Booksellers.

=== Personal life ===
Edwin Wolf II married Margaret “Peggy” Gimbel Dannenbaum in 1934. Together they had three children, Ellen, Anthony and Mary. Margaret died in a car accident in 1964. In 1965 he married Mary Paxson Matthews.

== Awards and recognition ==
Wolf's contributions were recognized by the 1981 Philadelphia Award, established by Edward Bok and given each year to a citizen of the Philadelphia region who, during the preceding year, acted and served on behalf of the best interests of the community.

== Selected bibliography ==
- Wolf, Edwin. The Book Culture of a Colonial American City: Philadelphia Books, Bookmen, and Booksellers. Oxford, Oxfordshire, England: Clarendon Press, 1988.
- Wolf, Edwin. Philadelphia Area Consortium of Special Collections Libraries. 1988. Legacies of Genius : A Celebration of Philadelphia Libraries ; a Selection of Books, Manuscripts, and Works of Art. Philadelphia: Philadelphia Area Consortium of Special Collections Libraries.
- Wolf, Edwin. At the Instance of Benjamin Franklin: A Brief History of the Library Company of Philadelphia, 1731–1976. The Library Company of Phil, 1976.
- Wolf, Edwin, and John Francis Fleming. Rosenbach: a biography. Cleveland: World, 1960.
