= Peter D. McDonald =

South African-born professor

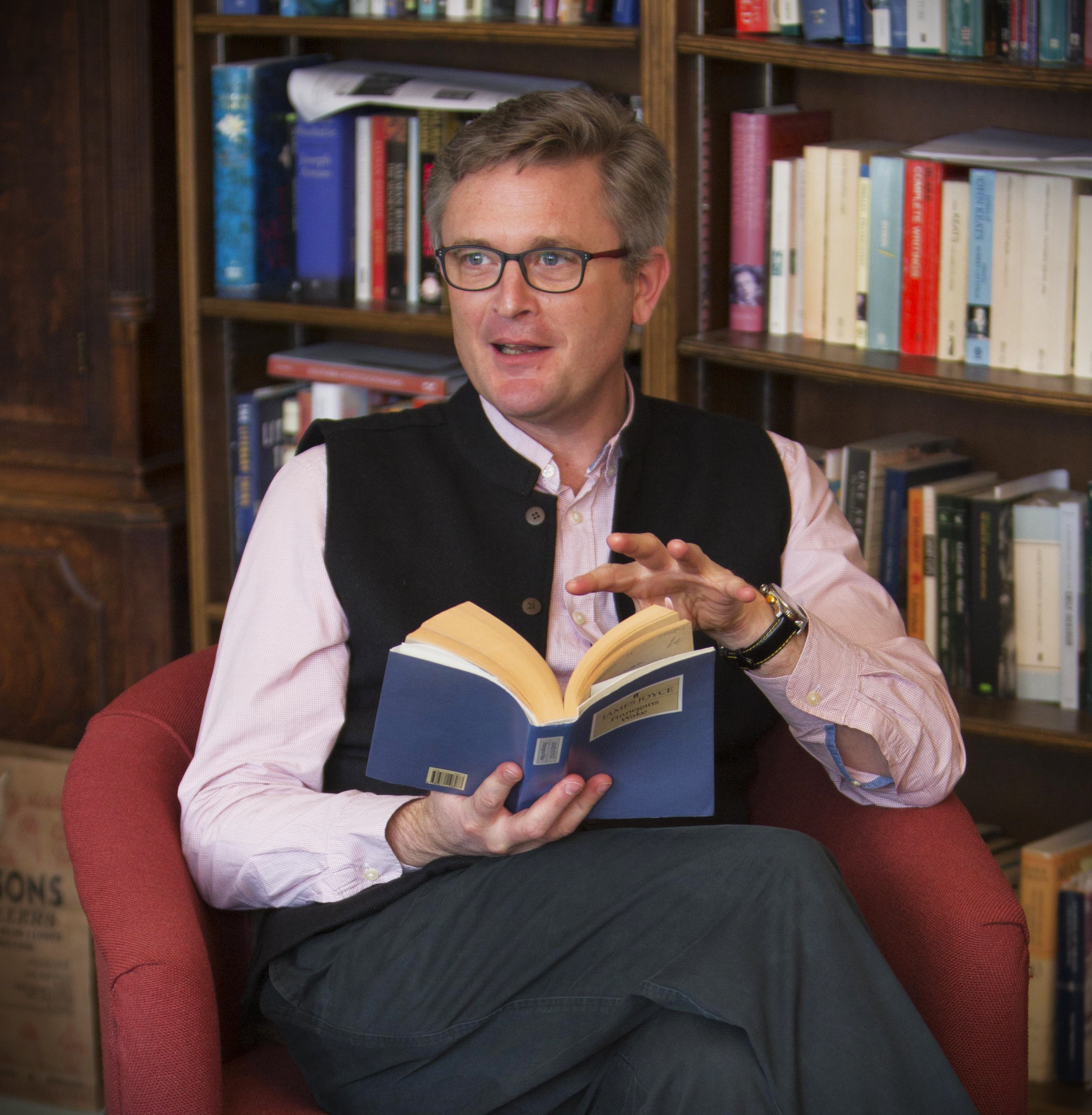
- Peter D.McDonald
- Born: 1964 (age 61–62); Cape Town, South Africa
- Occupation: University professor
- Employer: University of Oxford

Peter D. McDonald (born 1964) is a Fellow of St. Hugh's College and Professor of English and Related Literature at the University of Oxford. He was born in Cape Town in 1964 and educated in South Africa and England.

== The Double Life of Books ==
McDonald presented reflections from his own biography in 2022 at the A.S.W. Rosenbach Lectures in Bibliography at the University of Pennsylvania under the title, "The Secret Life of Books." The lectures have been recorded and are available and free to listen from a link at the site. The elusive process of what leading book historian, Robert Darnton, calls ‘inner appropriation’ that were the substance of McDonald's lectures were the basis of his 2024 volume, The Double Life of Books.

== Artefacts of Writing ==
In his 2017 book, Artefacts of Writing: Ideas of the State and Communities of Letters from Matthew Arnold to Xu Bing, McDonald charts the intersections between fiction, cultural institutions and politics. The Times Literary Supplement reviewer characterized the book as "dizzying, its depth oceanic."

To accompany the book McDonald maintains the website, "Artefacts of Writing: A site about language, writing, translation and thinking interculturally." The site is an online forum and an exercise in digital curation.

== Apartheid censorship ==
McDonald has explored apartheid censorship South Africa in his 2009 study, The Literature Police: Apartheid Censorship and Its Cultural Consequences.

McDonald is the first researcher to review the archives of the Publications Control Board. His study reviews the impact of government post-publication control. "He analyses the role of censors, writers, publishers and booksellers; and presents a number of case studies." Writing in the Mail & Guardian De Waal observed, "He also gives a full and enlightening account of the historical and political context and details matters from the perspectives of authors and publishers."

== Printers of the Mind ==
The 2002 book, Making Meaning: 'Printers of the Mind' and Other Essays by D. F. McKenzie, which McDonald edited with Michael F. Suarez was published in the series, Studies in Print Culture and the History of the Book, by the University of Massachusetts Press. The volume was characterized as effective, clear and even-handed.

== Literary production as a microcosm ==
In his 1997 monograph, British Literary Culture and Publishing Practice, 1880–1914, McDonald reframed theories of Pierre Bourdieu about the literary cycle as a microcosm in which writers, critics, publishers, printers, distributors and readers act according to certain laws, established structures and codified practices. He uses as case studies comparisons of Joseph Conrad, Arnold Bennett and Arthur Conan Doyle.

== Selected publications ==
McDonald, Peter D. The Double Life of Books: Making and Re-Making the Reader. 2024, Edinburgh University Press.

McDonald, Peter D. "Art as activism. Clearing a space for multiple, marginal voices: the writers' activism of PEN," and "Bugger universality:" an exchange with Antjie Krog / Antjie Krog and Peter D. McDonald," In Sandra Mayer, Ruth Scobie, eds. Authorship, Activism and Celebrity : Art and Action in Global Literature. 2023. New York: Bloomsbury Academic.

Pen International: An Illustrated History: Literature Knows No Frontiers, by Carles Torner, Jennifer Clement, Peter D. McDonald, Jan Martens, Ginevra Avalle, Rachel Potter, and Laetitia Zecchini, 2021. Northampton, Massachusetts: Interlink Books, an imprint of Interlink Publishing Group.

McDonald, Peter D. "On Method: African Materials," The Cambridge Quarterly,, 49 (September 2020): 303–312.

McDonald, Peter D. "Seeing through the Concept of World Literature," Journal of World Literature 4, 1 (2019): 13–34.

McDonald, Peter D. Artefacts of Writing: Ideas of the State and Communities of Letters from Matthew Arnold to Xu Bing. 2017, First ed. Oxford, United Kingdom: Oxford University Press.

McDonald, Peter D., "Coetzee's Critique of Language," pp. 160–179 in Beyond the Ancient Quarrel: Literature, Philosophy, and J.M. Coetzee, edited by Patrick Hayes and Jan Wilm. 2017 First ed. Oxford, United Kingdom: Oxford University Press.

McDonald, Peter D. “The Ethics of Reading and the Question of the Novel: The Challenge of J. M. Coetzee’s Diary of a Bad Year.” Novel: A Forum on Fiction 43, no. 3 (2010): 483–99.

McDonald, Peter D. “Ideas of the Book and Histories of Literature: After Theory?” PMLA : Publications of the Modern Language Association of America 121, no. 1 (2006): 214–28.

McDonald, Peter D. 2009. The Literature Police: Apartheid Censorship and Its Cultural Consequences. Oxford: Oxford University Press.

D. F. McKenzie (Author), Peter D. McDonald (Editor), Michael F. Suarez (Editor).Making Meaning: “Printers of the Mind” and Other Essays. 2002. Amherst Massachusetts: University of Massachusetts Press.

McDonald, Peter D. British Literary Culture and Publishing Practice, 1880-1914. Cambridge, U.K.; Cambridge University Press, 1997.
