= Michael F. Suarez =

American academic

Michael F. Suarez, S.J. is an American academic and Jesuit priest. He is the executive director of Rare Book School (RBS) at the University of Virginia (UVA), where he is also a professor of English, a university professor, and an honorary curator of special collections. In addition to serving as Rare Book School’s executive Director, Suarez teaches multiple courses on bibliography and book history at the school. He is also PI for $5.4 million in grants from the Andrew W. Mellon Foundation to support the study of bibliography and book history at Rare Book School and beyond.

== Education ==
Suarez has a B.A. from Bucknell University where he triple-majored in biology, English, and sociology and was a Phi Beta Kappa graduate. He graduated with departmental honors and received the 1982 Omicron Delta Kappa National Leader of the Year Award. His has a Doctor of Philosophy, a Master of Studies, and an M.A./B.A. from Oxford University; he also earned Master of theology and Master of divinity from the Weston Jesuit School of Theology. A Marshall Scholar at Oxford, he graduated first in his class and won the Sir Roger Newdigate Prize for Poetry and the Chancellor’s English Essay Prize.

== Career ==
A Jesuit priest, he previously taught at Fordham University, where he was the J.A. Kavanaugh Professor of English (1999–2009), and in the Faculty of English Language and Literature at Oxford University (1995–2009), where he was fellow and tutor in English at Campion Hall. He was a junior research fellow at St. John’s College, Oxford (1995–99). He has previously held research fellowships from the American Council of Learned Societies, the National Endowment for the Humanities, the Folger Shakespeare Library, and the Radcliffe Institute for Advanced Study at Harvard University.

Since 2010, he has served as the editor-in-chief of Oxford Scholarly Editions Online (OSEO), which contains the equivalent of over 870,000 print pages of digital content. He is also co-general editor of The Collected Works of Gerard Manley Hopkins. Also in 2010, The Oxford Companion to the Book, which he edited alongside H. R. Woudhuysen, was published. This million-word reference volume on books and manuscripts from the beginning of written history to the present day has since been commended as "a paradise for book lovers" and "a fount of knowledge where the Internet is but a slot machine."

He was chosen to deliver the 2014 to 2015 J. R. Lyell Readership in Bibliography lectures at the Bodleian Library, Oxford University for which he gave six talks titled "The Reach of Bibliography." In 2021, he gave the A. S. W. Rosenbach Lectures in Bibliography at the University of Pennsylvania. His series of three lectures was titled "Printing Abolition: How the Fight to Ban the British Slave Trade Was Won, 1783–1807" and highlighted the role of print publications of many kinds in creating public opinion against slavery in sugar plantations in the Caribbean.

In 2022, he was the inaugural guest professor of paleography at the University of Chicago. Suarez currently serves as the chair of the naming and memorials committee at the University of Virginia, which is dedicated to contextualizing and deliberating on statues and memorials on university grounds. Suarez delivered the UVA commencement address on May 17, 2025.

== Awards and honors ==
- Elected fellow, Society of Antiquaries of London, 2024
- Nominee, National Council on the Humanities, 2015
- Distinguished presidential fellow, Council on Library and Information Resources, 2015–16
- Fredson Bowers Award of the Bibliographical Society of America, 2014
- American Printing History Association Annual Award, 2012
- Elected member, American Antiquarian Society, 2011
- Elected member, Massachusetts Historical Society, 2014
- A Best Book of the Year, The Times Literary Supplement, 2009 for The Cambridge History of the Book in Britain Volume 5, 1695–1830. Cambridge: Cambridge University Press, 2009.
- A Best Book of the Year, The Times Literary Supplement 2010 for Oxford Companion to the Book. Oxford: Oxford University Press, 2010.
- A Best Book of the Year, The Times Literary Supplement 2012 for Oxford Companion to the Book. Oxford: Oxford Scholarly Editions Online, 2012.

== Selected publications ==
- Suarez, Michael F. "Dodsley's Collection of Poems and the Ghost of Pope: The Politics of Literary Reputation." Papers of the Bibliographical Society of America, vol. 88 (June 1994): 189–206.
- Suarez, Michael F. "Uncertain Proofs: Alexander Pope, Lewis Theobald, and Questions of Patronage." Papers of the Bibliographical Society of America vol. 96, no. 3 (2002): 404.
- McKenzie, D. F.; McDonald, Peter D. and Suarez, Michael Felix. Making Meaning: "Printers of the Mind" and Other Essays. Amherst: University of Massachusetts Press, 2002. ISBN 9781558493360.
- Suarez, Michael Felix. "Swift's Satire and Parody" in The Cambridge Companion to Jonathan Swift. Christopher Fox, ed. Cambridge: Cambridge University Press, 2003. pp. 112–27. ISBN 978-0521002837.
- Suarez, Michael F. "Historiographical Problems and Possibilities in Book History and National Histories of the Book." Studies in Bibliography, vol. 56 (2007): 141-170.
- Suarez, Michael Felix and H. R. Woudhuysen. The Oxford Companion to the Book. Oxford: Oxford University Press, 2010. ISBN 9780198606536.
- Suarez, Michael F. and Michael L. Turner, eds. The Cambridge History of the Book in Britain. vol. 5, 1695–1830. Cambridge: Cambridge University Press, 2010. ISBN 9781107626805.
- Suarez, Michael Felix, H. R Woudhuysen, and Oxford University Press. The Book : A Global History. Oxford: Oxford University Press, 2013.
- Suarez, Michael F. co-general editor. The Collected Works of Gerard Manley Hopkins: The Dublin Notebook. Oxford: Oxford University Press, 2015. ISBN 9780199534029
- Suarez, Michael F. "Hard Cases: Confronting Bibliographical Difficulty in Eighteenth-Century Texts." Papers of the Bibliographical Society of America vol. 111, no. 1 (2017): 1–30.
