= Curt F. Bühler =

American librarian (1905–1985)

- Born: July 11, 1905
- Died: August 2, 1985 (aged 80)
- Other names: Curt Ferdinand Bühler
- Education: Yale University (BA); Trinity College Dublin (PhD)
- Occupation: librarian

Curt Ferdinand Bühler (11 July 1905 – 2 August 1985) was an American librarian and expert of early books who published mainly on the art and history of books printed during the fifteenth century. He took degrees from Yale University (B.A., 1927) and Trinity College Dublin (Ph.D., 1930). After post-doctoral studies at the Ludwig-Maximilians-Universität München (LMU) from 1931 to 1933, he worked as a rare book curator at the Pierpont Morgan Library from 1934, was appointed Keeper of Printed Books in 1948, and remained with the Morgan Library until his formal retirement in 1973. His own collection of manuscripts and early printed books was bequeathed to the same library.

Bühler served as president of both the Bibliographical Society of America (1952-1954) and the Renaissance Society of America (1961-1963), and was a member of many other organizations including the Grolier Club, the Century Association, the Modern Language Association, the American Council of Learned Societies, the American Academy of Arts and Sciences, and the American Philosophical Society.

He was Rosenbach Fellow in Bibliography in 1946 at the University of Pennsylvania.

== Personal life ==
In July 1971, Bühler married Lucy Jane Ford Schoettle.

== Bibliography ==
- 1947: The Bible, Manuscripts and Printed Bibles from the Fourth to the Nineteenth Century, Pierpont Morgan Library, New York
- 1948: “The First Aldine.” The Papers of the Bibliographical Society of America 42, no. 4 : 269–80.
- 1949: Standards of Bibliographical Description, University of Pennsylvania Press, Philadelphia
- 1957. “Literary Research and Bibliographical Training.” The Papers of the Bibliographical Society of America 51, no. 4: 303–11.
- 1960: The Fifteenth-Century Book: the scribes, the printers, the decorators, University of Pennsylvania Press, Philadelphia
- 1960: William Caxton and His Critics: A Critical Reappraisal of Caxton's Contributions to the Enrichment of the English Language, Syracuse University Press, Syracuse, N.Y.
- 1973: Early Books and Manuscripts: forty years of research, The Grolier Club, New York
