= The Oxford Companion to the Book =

The Oxford Companion to the Book is a comprehensive reference work that covers the history and production of books from ancient to modern times. It is edited by Michael F. Suarez, SJ, and H. R. Woudhuysen, and published by Oxford University Press.

The Companion includes a series of introductory essays that provide an overview of the field of book history and production. These essays cover topics such as writing systems, the ancient and medieval book, book production, editorial theory and practice, and the economics of print. The Companion also includes 29 surveys of the history of the book in different regions of the world, including the Muslim world, Latin America, and Sub-Saharan Africa.

The main section of the Companion is an A–Z of over 5,000 entries, covering every aspect of the book, from brief definitions to more in-depth treatments. These entries cover traditional subjects such as bibliography, palaeography, and the history of printing, as well as newer disciplines such as the history of electronic books. The entries are linked by thorough cross-referencing and are organized using a classified index. The text is illustrated with reproductions, diagrams, and examples of various typographical features.

The Oxford Companion to the Book was written by 400 of the world's leading scholars in bibliography and book history. It is the only reference work of its kind in the field, and has been praised as a "monumental achievement" by Choice.

== Contents ==
The Companion covers a wide range of topics related to the materiality of written text and print, with a particular focus on the history of early, pre-Gutenberg print and text.

One of the standout features of the Companion is its coverage of the evolution of writing traditions across time and space. The first essay by Andrew Robinson provides an in-depth exploration of this topic, making it an excellent resource for those interested in the history of the book.

The Companion also sheds light on the oral traditions that have played a central role in the development of many religious texts, such as the Rig Veda. The book explains that the oral recitation of these sacred formulas is seen as a way to spiritually unite higher deities with mortals, and is an important part of Hindu rituals.

The main part of the first volume of the Companion is made up of extended pieces that provide valuable context for understanding the worldwide history of the book. Many of these pieces build on recent scholarly research on the spread of print and reading in the English-speaking world, such as the multivolume histories of the book in America, Britain, Canada, Australia, and Scotland.

The Companion also includes entries on the book in less well-known national histories, such as the Balkans, Korea, Japan, Southeast Asia, and the Nordic countries. This makes it an important resource for those interested in the global history of the book, and helps to give non-Western traditions their rightful place in this story.

The editors have indeed decided to retain a maximalist definition of the book and to embrace the whole of its history, under all its facets. On the one hand, no geographical limits are applied to the notion of book, which is extended to Aztec codices as well as to Chinese texts.

On the other hand, the will is to treat all the aspects of it, that they are cultural, social, economic or technical. This editorial choice is reflected in the encyclopedic part of the work, which occupies the last third of the first volume and the whole of the second. It contains a series of entries ranging from a few lines to a full page or more. They deal with publishers, libraries and librarians, collectors, researchers, technical terms in publishing or book history, important books and projects, concepts, and various associations related to the book.
