= Stanley Pargellis =

American historian (1898–1968)

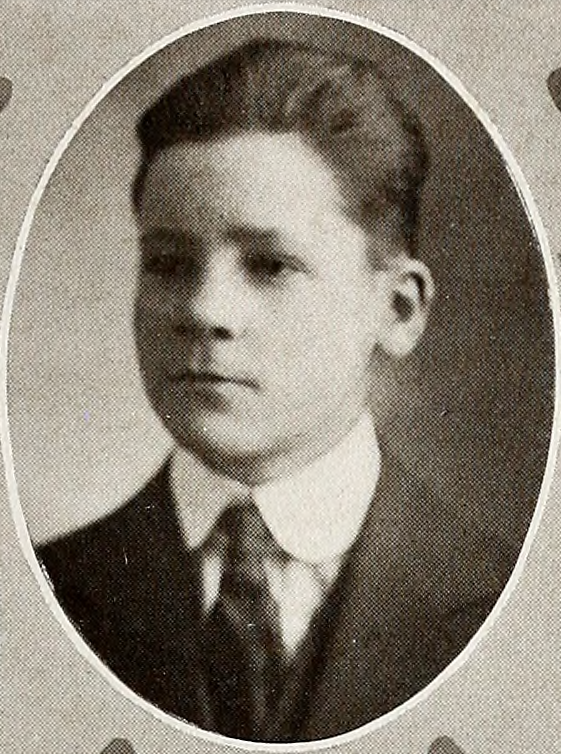
- Born: June 25, 1898; Toledo
- Died: January 6, 1968; Chicago
- Education: Harvard Law School, Exeter College
- Occupation: Librarian
- Awards: Rhodes Scholarship (1918); Distinguished Nevadan (1958)

Stanley McCrory Pargellis (June 25, 1898 – January 6, 1968) was an American historian and librarian. His work as a historian focused mainly on the military history of the American colonial era. From 1942 to 1962, he was director of the Newberry Library in Chicago.

== Biography ==
Pargellis was born in Toledo, Ohio, in 1898. He studied at the University of Nevada (B.A. 1918), at Harvard Law School, and as a Rhodes Scholar at Exeter College of the University of Oxford (B.A. 1922; M.A. 1929). He began his career as a lecturer in history and English at the California Institute of Technology from 1923 to 1925. From 1926 to 1942, he taught at Yale University, where he received a Ph.D. in 1929 with a thesis on Lord Loudoun. As a historian, he published mainly on the military history of the American colonial era. In 1936, he published a critical edition of military-historical documents from the archives of the Duke of Cumberland at Windsor Castle.

In 1942, Pargellis became Director of the Newberry Library in Chicago, one of the world's largest independent research libraries. He pursued a selective policy in the acquisition of new books, but contributed greatly to opening up and expanding the archival holdings. Pargellis "made the collection stronger by a quarter-million volumes and instituted a program of fellowships, publications, exhibitions, and public lectures—anything to make better known the treasures of the Newberry." He was especially credited with acquiring archival documents from American economic and corporate history, for example by securing the entire business archive of the Chicago, Burlington and Quincy Railroad. Pargellis also emphasized the importance of archiving American corporate history in two lectures to the Newcomen Society, "The Judgment of History on American Business" (1943) and "The Corporation and the Historian" (1944). While he was director, an in-house library periodical, the Newberry Library Bulletin, was launched in 1944. He retired from the Newberry in 1962.

He gave the A.S.W. Rosenbach Lectures in Bibliography in 1962.

Pargellis was interested in literary studies, supporting the journal Poetry with donations from the library during a period of financial difficulty in the 1940s. Pargellis was one of the founders of the Hounds of the Baskerville (sic), a Sherlock Holmes society in Chicago affiliated with The Baker Street Irregulars, and gave the group its name.

Pargellis was married to Elizabeth Allen, with whom he had three children.

After the death of his first wife, he married Mabel Spence Erler, who had worked at the library for 38 years and was head of the Technical Services Department. She traveled to Europe to buy books and other research materials for the library and corresponded regularly with many of the distinguished book dealers of the continent, England and the United States. She died in 1988.

He died of cancer in Chicago in 1968.

== Selected works ==
=== Monographs ===
- Lord Loudoun in North America. (Yale University Press, New Haven, 1933; reprinted, Archon Books, Hamden, Conn. 1968).
- "Father Gabriel Richard" (Wayne University Press, Detroit 1950).

=== Selected essays and lectures ===
- "The Four Independent Companies of New York," in Essays in Colonial History Presented to Charles McLean Andrews by His Students (Yale University Press, New Haven 1931).
- "Braddock's Defeat," in American Historical Review 41:2 (1936), pp, 253–69.
- "The Judgment of History on American Business" (a Newcomen Address) (Princeton University Press 1943).
- "The Corporation and the Historian" (a Newcomen Address) (Princeton University Press 1944).
- "Building a Research Library," in College and Research Libraries (March 5, 1944), pp. 110–14.
- "On Being a Librarian," in The American Oxonian 40 (Jan. 1953), pp. 3–8.

=== Works edited ===
- Military Affairs in North America, 1748-1765: Selected Documents from the Cumberland Papers in Windsor Castle. (D. Appleton-Century Co., New York and London 1936; reprint: Archon Books, Hamden, Conn. 1969).
- (with Ruth Lapham Butler) Nathaniel Fish Moore: Diary: A Trip from New York to the Falls of St. Anthony in 1845 (University of Chicago Press 1946).
- (with Lloyd Lewis) Granger Country: A Pictorial Social History of the Burlington Railroad (Little, Brown, Boston 1949).
- (with D. J. Medley) Bibliography of British History: The Eighteenth Century, 1714-1789 (Rowman & Littlefield, Totowa, N.J. 1977).

=== Secondary literature ===
- Billington, Ray Allen. "Stanley Pargellis: Newberry Librarian, 1942–1962," in Essays in History and Literature Presented by Fellows of the Newberry Library to Stanley Pargellis, ed. Heinz Bluhm (Chicago: Newberry Library, 1965): 3–18.
- Heinz Bluhm, ed., Essays in History and Literature Presented by Fellows of the Newberry Library to Stanley Pargellis (Newberry Library, Chicago 1965) (Festschrift). A full list of Pargellis's publications is found in this work at pages 221-31.
- D.W. Krummel, "Pargellis, Stanley," in Dictionary of American Library Biography (Libraries Unlimited, Littleton, Colo. 1978), pp. 389–91.
