= Lawrence William Towner =

American historian and librarian

Lawrence William Towner (September 10, 1921 – June 12, 1992) was an American historian, editor, and librarian who served as director of the Newberry Library in Chicago from 1962 to 1986.

Lawrence William Towner was born on September 10, 1921, in St. Paul, Minnesota. He graduated from Cornell College in Mount Vernon, Iowa, in 1942, with concentrations in history and literature.

From 1943 to 1946 he served as a pilot in the U.S. Army Air Corps in the China-Burma-India Theater of World War II.

After the war, Towner began graduate studies in American history at Northwestern University while teaching at the Latin School of Chicago. He earned an M.A. and a Ph.D. in 1955. His dissertation, A Good Master Well Served: A Social History of Servitude in Massachusetts, 1620–1750, examined the lives of servants, apprentices, and the enslaved in colonial New England, drawing primarily on public records.

Towner was then a faculty member at the Massachusetts Institute of Technology. In 1955 he moved to Williamsburg, Virginia, where he was editor of The William and Mary Quarterly until 1962. He was elected to the American Antiquarian Society in 1963.

In 1962 Towner became director and librarian (later titled president and librarian) at the Newberry Library in Chicago where he served until retirement in 1986.

Towner was chairman of the Illinois Humanities Council from 1976 to 1979 and honored with creation of the Lawrence W. Towner Award which encouraged “risk-taking in the development and execution of a public humanities project.”

He was an influential advocate for the National Endowment for the Humanities who defended federal support for humanities research libraries and institutions.

He died June 12, 1992.

== Selected publications ==
- Towner, Lawrence W. (April 1962). "'A Fondness for Freedom': Servant Protest in Puritan Society". William and Mary Quarterly. 3rd ser. 19 (2): 201–219.
- Towner, Lawrence W. (January 1964). "The Sewall-Saffin Dialogue on Slavery". William and Mary Quarterly. 3rd ser. 21 (1): 40–52.
- Towner, Lawrence W. (1966). "The Indentures of Boston's Poor Apprentices, 1734–1805". Publications of the Colonial Society of Massachusetts. 43: 417–468.
- Towner, Lawrence W. (1970). An Uncommon Collection of Uncommon Collections: The Newberry Library. Newberry Library Associates publication. Chicago: Newberry Library.
- Towner, Lawrence W. (1977). The Newberry Library: A Brief History. Chicago: Newberry Library.
- Towner, Lawrence W. (1993). Karrow, Robert W. Jr.; Young, Alfred F. (eds.). Past Imperfect: Essays on History, Libraries, and the Humanities. Chicago: University of Chicago Press.
