= Henry Woudhuysen =

British bibliographer and academic

Professor Henry Woudhuysen FSA FBA
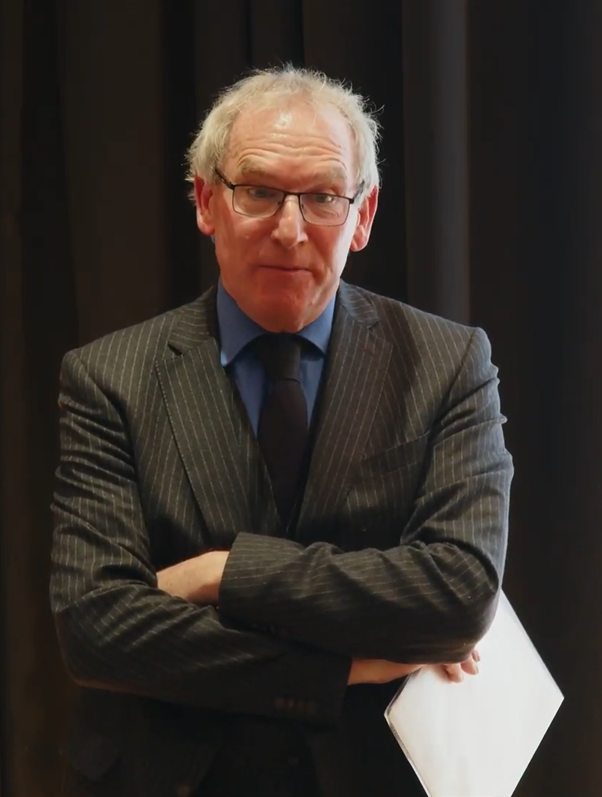
- Woudhuysen in 2023
- Born: Henry Ruxton Woudhuysen; 24 October 1954 (age 72)
- Occupations: Historian and academic
- Spouse: Deborah Loudon
- Children: 1

Academic background
- Education: St Paul's School, London
- Alma mater: Pembroke College, Oxford
- Thesis: Leicester's literary patronage: A study of the English court, 1578–1582 (1981)
- Doctoral advisor: Katherine Duncan-Jones

Academic work
- Discipline: English studies; History
- Sub-discipline: History of the book; English Renaissance theatre; Political history; Literary history; Palaeography
- Institutions: Lincoln College, Oxford; University College London
- Notable works: The Oxford Companion to the Book; The Arden Shakespeare

Henry Ruxton Woudhuysen, FSA, FBA (born 24 October 1954), is a British academic specialising in Renaissance English literature. He was the Rector of Lincoln College, Oxford from 2012 to 2024. He was previously Dean of the Faculty of Arts and Humanities at University College London.

== Biography ==
Woudhuysen was educated at St. Paul's School, London, and studied for MA and DPhil degrees at Pembroke College, Oxford. His doctoral thesis title was Leicester's literary patronage: A study of the English court, 1578–1582 and his supervisor was Katherine Duncan-Jones. His first academic role was at Lincoln College as a Junior Research Fellow in English Literature in 1978 before he joined University College London.

In 2010, Woudhuysen was elected a Fellow of the British Academy (FBA), the United Kingdom's national academy for the humanities and social sciences. Between 1995 and 2020 Woudhuysen served as a general editor for the third series of the Arden Shakespeare.

The Oxford Companion to the Book which he edited with Michael F. Suarez was published in 2010.

The Book: A Global History by Woudhuysen and Michael F. Suarez was published in 2013.

In 2023 he gave the Panizzi Lectures at the British Library.

== Personal life ==
Woudhuysen is married to Deborah Loudon, a former HR director in the Home Office. Their son George is a historian of the Roman Empire at the University of Nottingham.

== Bibliography ==
- The Penguin Book of Renaissance Verse: 1509–1659 (editor; London: Penguin Books, 1992) ISBN 0713990163
- Sir Philip Sidney and the Circulation of Manuscripts, 1558–1640 (Oxford: Clarendon Press, 1996) ISBN 0198129661
- The Oxford Companion to the Book (co-editor with Michael F. Suarez; Oxford: Oxford University Press, 2010) ISBN 9780198606536
- The Book: A Global History (co-editor with Michael F. Suarez; Oxford: Oxford University Press, 2013) ISBN 9780199679416
- Essays to Mark the Centenary of the Oxford Bibliographical Society, 1922–2022 (co-editor with David Rundle; Oxford: The Oxford Bibliographical Society, 2024) ISBN 9780901420657
