= Brian Stock (historian) =

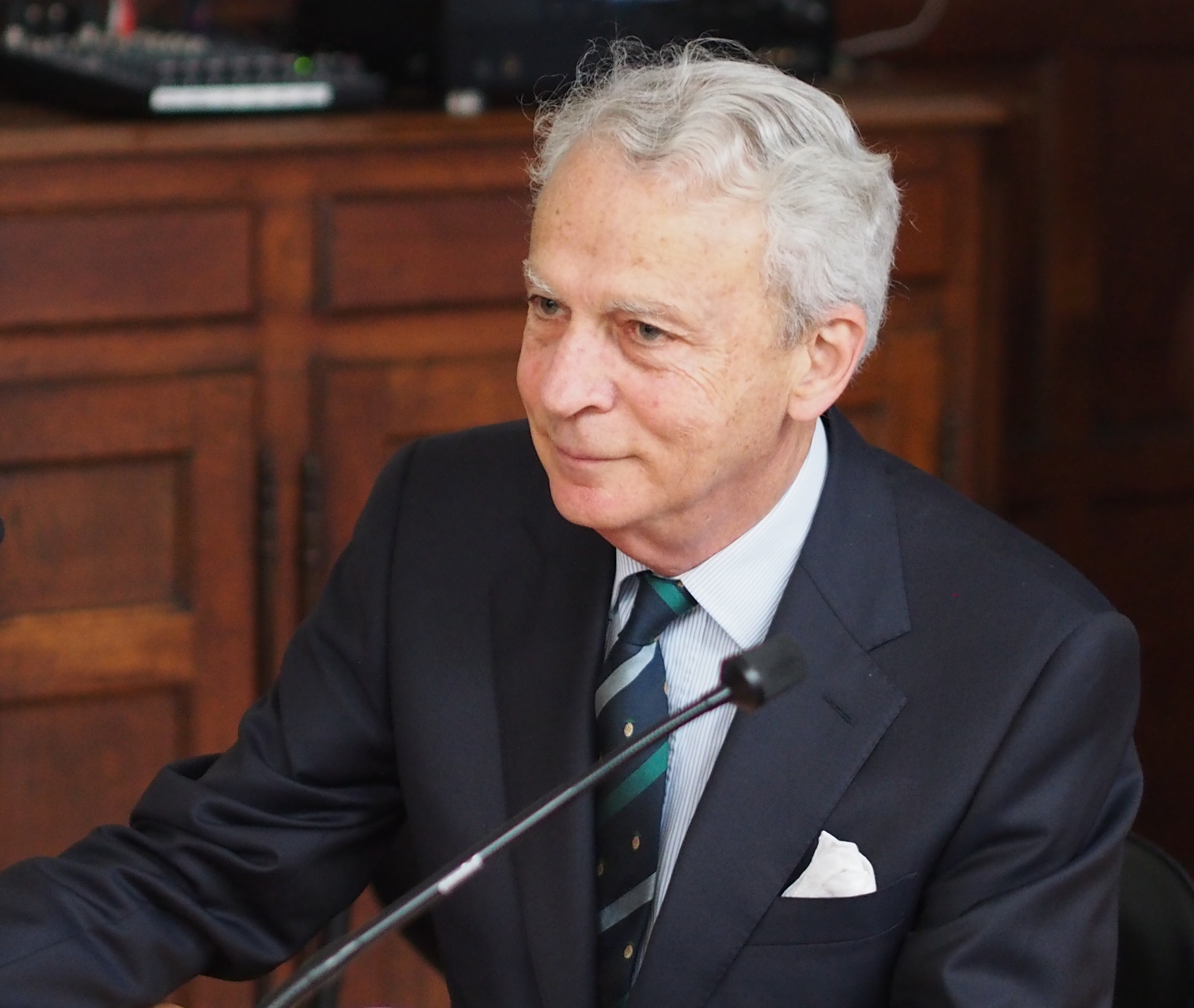
Brian Stock, Reid Hall, Paris, on June 6, 2013.

Brian Stock (born June 8, 1939) is an American born Canadian historian. He is a historian of modes of perception between the ancient world and the sixteenth century. He was Rouse Ball Student at Trinity College, Cambridge, and Senior Fellow at the Pontifical Institute of Mediaeval Studies, Toronto, before joining the graduate faculty of the University of Toronto, where he taught history and literature until 2007. He is a Canadian and French citizen.

== Biography ==
Educated in Canada, Stock completed his A.B., summa cum laude, at Harvard College in 1962 and his Ph.D. at Trinity College, Cambridge, in 1967. He carried out post-doctoral studies at the École Pratique des Hautes Études, Paris and the University of Rome, La Sapienza.

He was elected a Junior Fellow of the Pontifical Institute of Mediaeval Studies, Toronto, in 1966-67 and a Senior Fellow in 1972 (with a cross-appointment as full professor at the University of Toronto). He subsequently taught at the École des Hautes Études en Sciences Sociales, Paris. He was elected to a visiting professorship at the Collège de France in 1987 and to the Chaire Internationale in that institution in 1996.

He delivered the A.S.W. Rosenbach Lectures in Bibliography at the University of Pennsylvania in 1999. He was elected the Sather Professor of Classical Literature at the University of California, Berkeley, in 2001. He delivered the Jerusalem Lectures of the Historical Society of Israel in 2005.

He has been a visiting university professor at several institutions and presently holds that position at the Central European University (Budapest). He has been visiting Mellon Professor of Classics at Brown University, where a colloquium on The Implications of Literacy was held in 1986 under the auspices of the NEH. An international conference on his publications was held in Toronto in 2019. He is presently Senior Research Fellow at Victoria College, University of Toronto and holds the chair of criticism at the Accademia Nazionale dei Lincei in Rome, which awarded him the prestigious International Feltrinelli Prize in 2007.

He has one daughter, Maxime Pineau-Valencienne, and two grandchildren, Marie-Capucine and Thomas.

== Honors and awards ==
International Feltrinelli Prize, Accademia Nazionale dei Lincei, Rome, 2007

== Publications ==
Brian Stock’s scholarship engages the history of science, the history of literacy, and the history of reading.

His 1972 monograph, Myth and Science in the Twelfth Century, examined the work of the twelfth-century Latin poet, Bernard Silvester, in particular his poem, the Cosmographia, which represents a synthesis of literary and empirical approaches to the study of nature. Stock demonstrates that Silvester’s work holds aesthetic and rational approaches to nature in tension and thereby participates the twelfth-century’s renewed interest in theories of creation.

The Implications of Literacy (1983) studied the social effects of the growth of manuscript culture that took place in the Latin West during the late eleventh and twelfth centuries. In this work Stock coined the term “textual community” to refer to social groups that form around the interpretation of a text. The concept has since been widely applied in social history, anthropology, literary studies, and digital humanities.

His 1996 book, Augustine the Reader, developed a theory of reading from Augustine, connecting it to important aspects of Augustine’s philosophy and spirituality. The book establishes Augustine as the founder of the theory of reading in the West. This was the first of several studies addressing Augustine’s thought and influence. Stock’s After Augustine (2001) examined how Augustine’s theories of reading and narrative continued to shape literary culture in the medieval and early modern periods. His monograph Augustine’s Inner Dialogue (2010) analyzed the ways that Augustine transformed the philosophical dialogue into a literary form and a technique of self-analysis. Finally, The Integrated Self (2017) featured a sequence of essays exploring how the post-conversion Augustine harmonizes classical philosophy with Christian practices of sacred reading

In addition to these studies, Stock has published numerous essays and several volumes of literary criticism dealing with modes of thought and perception between the ancient and early modern worlds. Listening for the Text (1990) developed theoretical frameworks for discussing changes in forms of communication and knowledge transfer that occurred during the medieval period. The book has been translated into Italian (La voce del testo, Rome, 1995). More recently he has published on the therapeutic effects of meditation and reading in the journal New Literary History.

In English:

- Myth and Science in the Twelfth Century: A Study of Bernard Silvester, Princeton University Press, 1972
- The Implications of Literacy: Written Language and Models of Interpretation in the Eleventh and Twelfth Centuries, Princeton University Press, 1983
- Listening for the Text: On the Uses of the Past, Baltimore and London, Johns Hopkins University Press, 1990
- Augustine the Reader: Meditation, Self-Knowledge, and the Ethics of Interpretation, Cambridge and London, Harvard University Press, 1996
- After Augustine: The Meditative Reader and the Text, University of Pennsylvania Press, 1996
- Ethics through Literature: Aesthetic and Ascetic Reading in Western Culture, Hanover, University Press of New England, 2007
- Augustine's Inner Dialogue: The Philosophical Soliloquy in Late Antiquity, Cambridge University Press, 2010
- The Integrated Self: Augustine, the Bible, and Ancient Thought, university of Pennsylvania Press, 2016.
- Stock, Brian, and Pontifical Institute of Mediaeval Studies. 2023. Textual Communities, Textual Selves : Essays in Dialogue with Brian Stock. Edited by Sarah Powrie and Gur Zak. Toronto: Pontifical Institute of Mediaeval Studies.

In French:

- La connaissance de soi au Moyen Âge et la littérature autobiographique, leçon inaugurale faite le vendredi 9 janvier 1998, Paris, Conférences au Collège de France, 1998 (Self-knowledge in the Middle Ages and autobiographical literature inaugural lecture made Friday, January 9, 1998, Paris, Lectures at the Collège de France, 1998)
- Bibliothèques intérieures, trad. de Philippe Blanc et Christophe Carraud, préface de Christophe Carraud, Grenoble, Jérôme Millon, 2005 (Internal libraries, trans. Philippe Blanc and Christophe Carraud, preface by Christopher Carraud, Grenoble, Jérôme Millon, 2005)
- Lire, une ascèse ? Lecture ascétique et lecture esthétique dans la culture occidentale : Menahem Stern Jerusalem lectures, 2005, trad. de Christophe Carraud, Grenoble, Jérôme Millon, 2008 (Read asceticism? Ascetic aesthetic reading and reading in Western culture: Menahem Stern Jerusalem readings, 2005, trans. Christopher Carraud, Grenoble, Jérôme Millon, 2008)

== Administration ==
With Charles Halpern, Stock was one of the organizers of the Center for Contemplative Mind and for two years he chaired the committee for the Contemplative Practice Fellowships of the American Council of Learned Societies.

He was appointed to a six-year term as member of the Academic Advisory Board of the Berlin Institute for Advanced Study in 1991. He has served on executive committees of the Maison des Sciences de l’Homme, Paris and was a member of the planning committee that founded the Institut d’Études Avancées de Paris. He is member of the advisory board of New Literary History and serves on the Comité scientifique of the Revue des Études Augustiniennes, Paris. Stock is editor of the Rivista di Storia e Letteratura Religiosa.
