= Donald Woodward Lee =

American philologist

Donald Woodward Lee (April 17, 1910 − May 31, 1977) was an American philologist who served until 1975 as Professor of English at the University of Houston.

== Biography ==
Donald Woodward Lee was born in Wilkes-Barre, Pennsylvania on April 17, 1910. He earned his bachelor of arts degree from the Pennsylvania State University, his master's degree from Duke University and his doctor of philosophy from Columbia University. Throughout his career Lee taught at the University of Connecticut, the United States Naval Academy, Pennsylvania State University, the University of Vermont and Virginia State College, and was eventually appointed Professor of English at the University of Houston.

Lee was an editor of the Third Edition of the Merriam Webster Dictionary and the author of several English textbooks. He was a member of the Modern Language Association of America, the Linguistic Society of America, the National Council of Teachers of English and other related organizations.

Lee retired from the University of Houston in 1975. He died at the University of Texas Medical Branch on May 31, 1977 after a brief illness.
