= Newberry Library =

Research library in Chicago, Illinois

Coordinates: 41.9000°N 87.6306°W

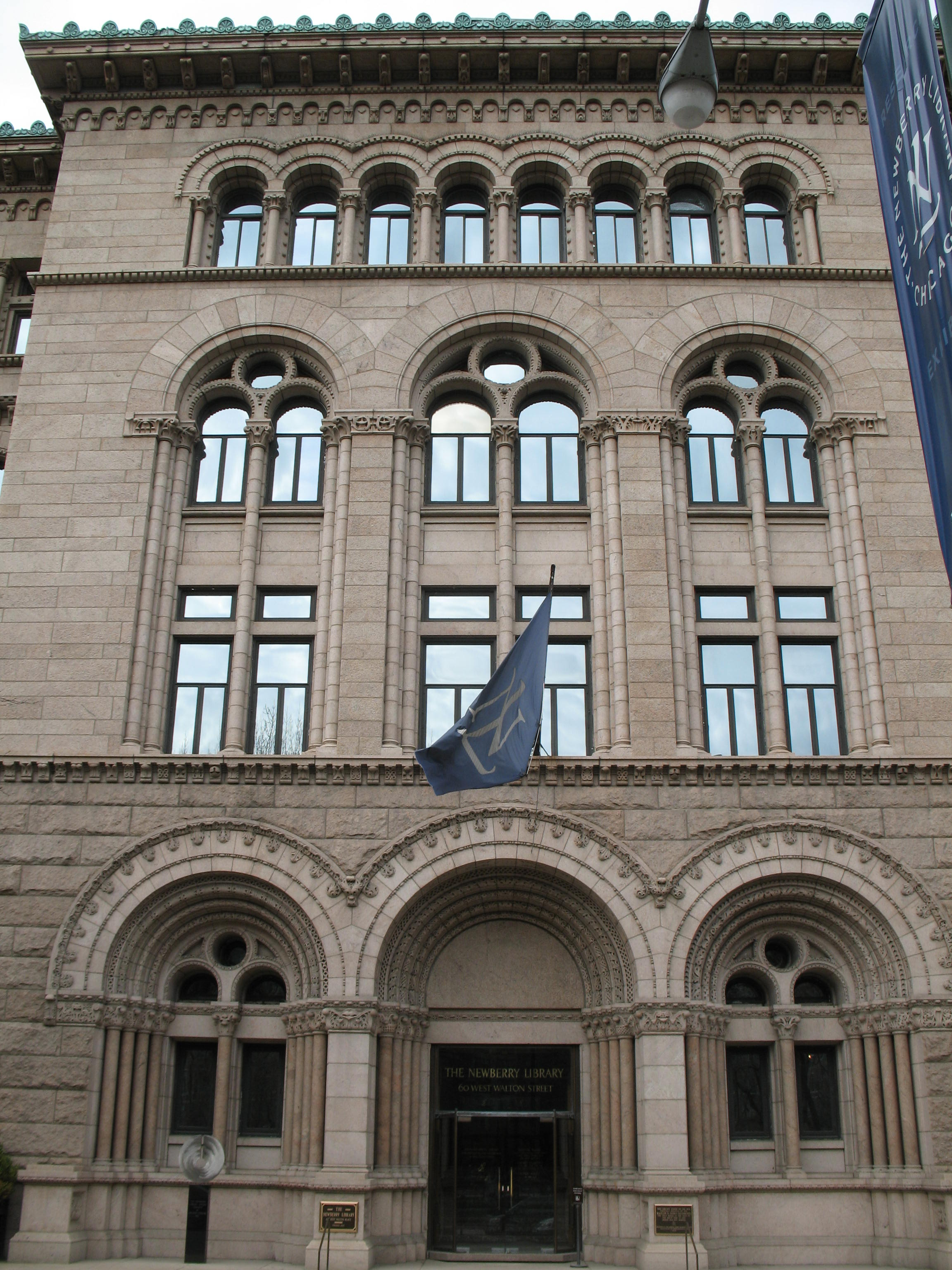
- Location: Chicago, Illinois, US
- Type: Independent research library Special library
- Established: 1887

Collection
- Criteria for collection: Humanities

Access and use
- Access requirements: Age 14, with research interest served by the collection; open access digital collections online
- Circulation: Non-circulating reference library

Other information
- Director: Astrida Orle Tantillo
- Website: www.newberry.org

The Newberry Library is an independent research library specializing in the humanities, located in the Near North Side community area of Chicago, Illinois, United States. It has been free and open to the public since 1887.

== Collections ==
The Newberry's collections contain primary and secondary sources spanning more than six centuries of history related primarily to the history, culture, and people of Western Europe and the Americas. Core collection strengths include:

- American History and Culture
- American Indian and Indigenous Studies
- Chicago and the Midwest
- Genealogy and Local History
- History of the Book
- Maps, Travel, and Exploration
- Medieval, Renaissance, and Early Modern Studies
- Modern Manuscripts and Archives
- Performing Arts
- Postcards
- Religion

The collection consists of about 1.6 million books; 600,000 maps; 1,300 distinct archival collections containing approximately 5 million manuscript pages; 500,000 different postcards; approximately 250,000 pieces of sheet music; and much more.

Notable items held at the Newberry include:

- Chicago's only copy of Mr. William Shakespeare's Comedies, Histories, & Tragedies, commonly referred to as the First Folio
- The archives of the Chicago, Burlington & Quincy Railroad
- Over 700 American Revolutionary pamphlets
- Thomas Jefferson's own annotated copy of The Federalist
- The first and second editions of the Eliot Bible
- The Popol Vuh, which is the earliest surviving copy of the Mayan creation story
- Ledger art created by Northern Cheyenne warrior-artists in the 1870s, as well as modern interpretations of the ledger art tradition by contemporary Native artists
- A 1692 fur trade contract that has one of the first references to "Chicago" in writing
- Maps, souvenirs, and ephemera from the World's Columbian Exposition
- The papers of journalist, playwright, and screenwriter Ben Hecht
- Resources for genealogists, including city directories, church and synagogue records, phonebooks, cemetery records, censuses, and newspapers like the Chicago Daily News, Chicago Tribune, and Chicago Defender
- More than 2,500 incunables (books printed before 1501)
- Artists' books by contemporary midwestern and Chicago printers such as Jennifer Farrell and Audrey Niffenegger
- Atlases of Ptolemy, Ortelius, and Mercator
- A wide array of 19th- and 20th-century guidebooks in various European languages
- Georgette de Montenay's 1571 emblem book, which was the first of its kind published by a woman
- Pre-1800 European and British literary, historical, and devotional manuscripts, printed books, and maps
- The archival records of prominent Chicago dance companies like Hubbard Street Dance Company, Chicago City Ballet, and Joel Hall Dancers
- Handwritten scores by Mozart, Chopin, Mahler, and Wagner
- The Curt Teich Postcard Archives Collection, which includes more than 500,000 unique postcard images
- 17th- and 18th-century Mexican choir books
- Martin Luther's pamphlets against the papacy

As a non-circulating library, all collection items are made available free of charge on site to anyone who is 14 years of age or older. Reference staff are available in the Newberry's two reading rooms and in the Welcome Center just off the lobby. Reference librarians work with all readers and offer orientation, in-depth bibliographical instruction, and specialized assistance as needed.

Many items from the Newberry's collections are digitized and can be accessed online.

== Offerings for the public ==
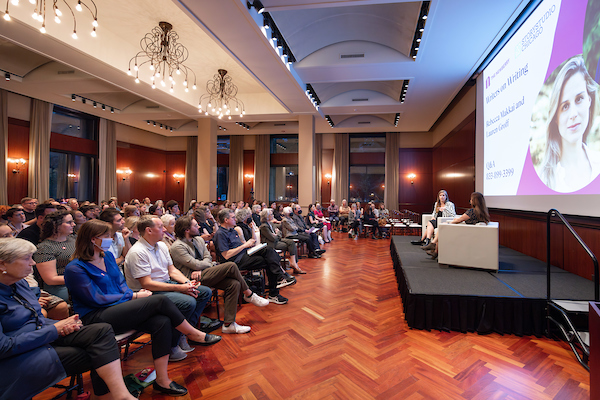
Newberry Library Writers on Writing with Rebecca Makkai and Lauren Groff on October 4, 2023.

The Newberry offers free public programs, which are often livestreamed and shared on the library's YouTube page. These programs explore a variety of topics related to the library's collection strengths. Recent speakers include: Rebecca Makkai, Chicago-based author of The Great Believers; Tiya Miles, Professor of History at Harvard University and author of All That She Carried: The Journey of Ashley's Sack, a Black Family Keepsake; Jill Wine-Banks, MSNBC Legal Analyst; maritime archaeologist Mensun Bound; Elizabeth Ellis (Peoria Nation of Oklahoma), Associate Professor of History at Princeton University; Mike Amezcua, Assistant Professor in the Department of History at Georgetown University and author of Making Mexican Chicago; and poet, essayist, and cultural critic Hanif Abdurraqib.

The Newberry mounts four free exhibitions a year in two gallery spaces. These exhibitions consist primarily of items from the library's collections.

Recent exhibitions include:

- Pictures from an Exposition: Visualizing the 1893 World's Fair (2018)
- The Legacy of Chicago Dance (2019)
- Renaissance Invention: Stradanus's "Nova Reperta" (2020)
- ¡Viva la Libertad! Latin America and the Age of Revolutions (2021)
- A Show of Hands: Handwriting in the Age of Print (2022)
- Handmaidens for Travelers: The Pullman Company Maids (2022)
- Pop-Up Books through the Ages (2023)
- A Night at Mister Kelly's (2024)

Adult education classes are offered throughout the year at the Newberry. Classes are either held at the library or virtually via Zoom. Led by experts in a variety of fields, these classes can help participants jumpstart or elevate their next learning endeavor.

The Newberry Bookshop, located in the lobby of the library, curates a selection of books reflecting the Newberry's collection strengths and upcoming public programming. It also sells goods such as cards, posters, puzzles, and literary action figures.

In 2018, the library opened a welcome center and expanded bookshop as part of a $12.7 million first-floor renovation designed by Ann Beha Architects.

== Resources for scholars, students, and teachers ==
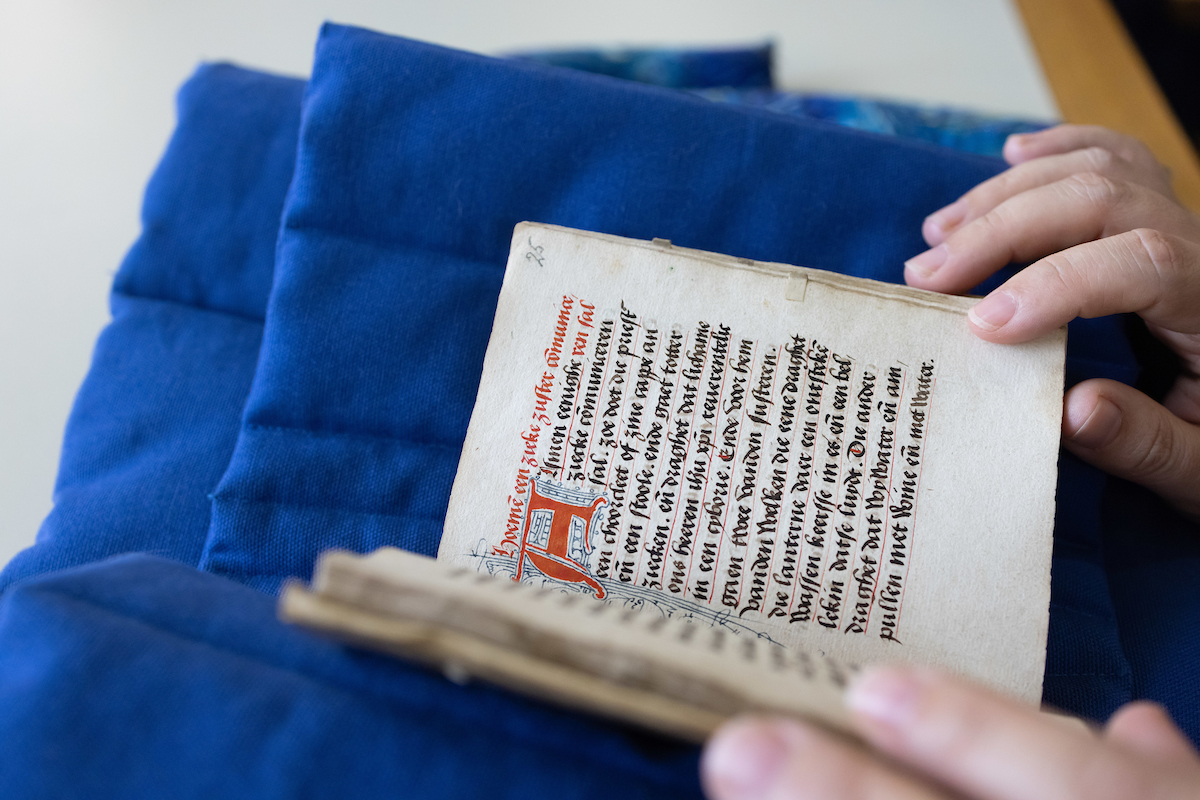
A Newberry Fellow examines an item from the library's collection

Beginning in 1944 with a grant from the Rockefeller Foundation, the Newberry began hosting researchers from different disciplines and backgrounds for both short- and long-term fellowships. These fellows form a close community during their time at the Newberry and continue to build their relationships with one another and with the library long after they leave. Researchers with long-term fellowships spend four to nine months at the Newberry. Researchers with short-term fellowships spend one to two months at the library. Newberry fellows often produce works that stems from their research at the library.

Examples of recent books by former Newberry fellows include:

- Only the Clothes on Her Back by Laura F. Edwards (Long-Term Fellow 2019–2020)
- Last Call at the Hotel Imperial by Deborah Cohen (Long-Term Fellow 2019–2020)
- Botanical Entanglements: Women, Natural Science, and the Arts in Eighteenth-Century England by Anna Katie Sagal (Long-Term Fellow 2017–2018)

The library offers a series of content-based professional development seminars for teachers. Led by scholars and educators, these humanities-focused seminars create space for teachers to connect with peers, explore the Newberry's collection as scholars, and learn to use primary sources in the classroom.

The Newberry Library Undergraduate Seminar (NLUS) offers select students from DePaul University, Loyola University Chicago, Roosevelt University, and the University of Illinois Chicago the chance to participate in an intensive research seminar inspired by the Newberry's collection. During their semester at the library, students attend seminar meetings and learn to conduct research. Students work closely with Newberry staff to form research questions before venturing into the archives on their own. The seminar culminates in a major research paper and presentation.

== Research centers ==
The Newberry is home to three research centers:

- Center for Renaissance Studies
- D'Arcy McNickle Center for American Indian and Indigenous Studies
- Hermon Dunlap Smith Center for the History of Cartography

In addition the Family and Community History Center, directed by Richard J. Jensen and Daniel Scott Smith operated in the 1970s. It trained over 600 historians in quantitative methods and demographic history.

== Early history ==
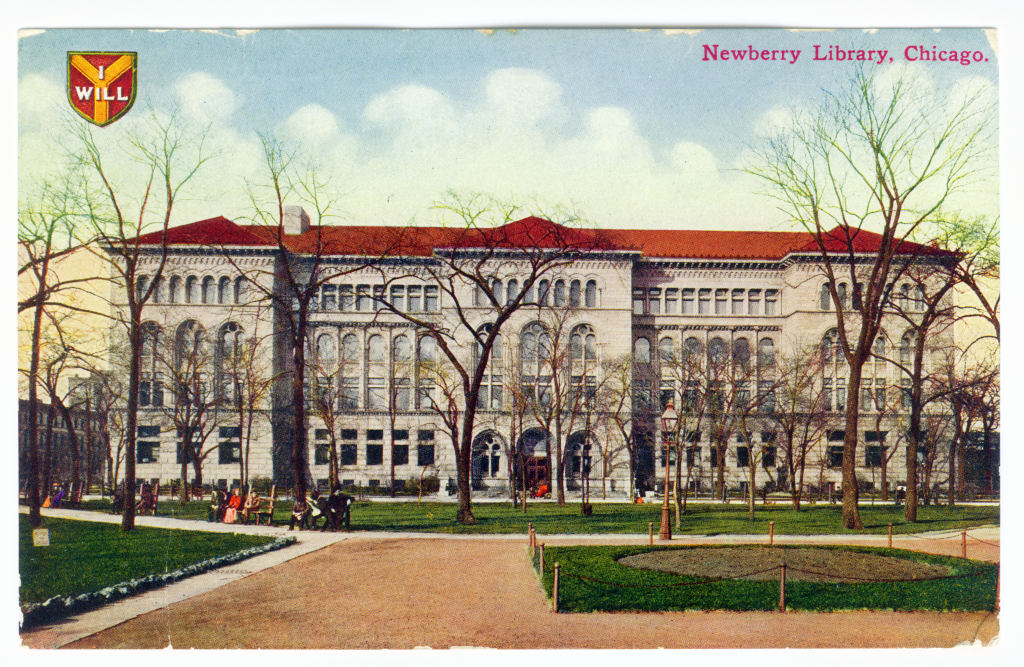
Library from Washington Square on a c. 1910 postcard

The Newberry was established in 1887 as the result of a bequest by Walter Loomis Newberry, an early Chicago resident and business leader involved in banking, shipping, real estate, and other commercial ventures. Newberry died at sea in 1868, while on a trip to France. He included in his will a provision of funds for the creation of a "free public library" should his daughters die without heirs. They did, and so, following the death of Newberry's widow, Julia Butler Newberry, in 1885, it was up to Newberry estate trustees William H. Bradley and Eliphalet W. Blatchford to bring the library to fruition.

Without much direction (Newberry did not leave behind many details regarding his vision for the library) and without its founder's personal collection as a foundation (Newberry's own collection of books perished in the Great Fire of 1871), the first officers and staff members were instrumental in forming the character of the Newberry.

The Newberry's first librarian, William Frederick Poole, was a major figure in the library world when he came to the Newberry. Poole saw the Newberry as a blank canvas on which he could project his ideas, which included and perhaps found their most impassioned articulation in the design and construction of libraries. In 1887–88 it was located at 90 La Salle Street, in 1889–90 at 338 Ontario Street, and in 1890–1893 at the northwest corner of State and Oak Streets. The present building, designed by Poole and architect Henry Ives Cobb (1859–1931), opened in 1893. It is located at 60 West Walton Street, across from Washington Square. It is a structure in the Spanish Romanesque architectural style, built of Connecticut granite.

Poole and Cobb feuded bitterly over their different visions for the library building. Poole favored a number of reading rooms with open shelving of materials that could be easily accessed by patrons; Cobb preferred the majestic grandiosity in vogue in Europe and the centralization of collection items. Poole's influence with the library's trustees coerced Cobb to temper the grand staircase he had envisioned and to accommodate open shelving. Over time, however, the open shelving put too much strain on the Newberry's staff and the security of its collections, and the library converted to a centralized storage system.

Poole served as Newberry librarian until his death in 1894. Under his leadership, the library built broad reference collections useful to many different Chicagoans, especially professionals and tradespeople. The Newberry's medical department, created in 1890, is an example of this emphasis. Poole also steered the Newberry toward the acquisition of rare materials for use by professional scholars. Two en bloc acquisitions made during his tenure, the private collections of Henry Probasco and Count Pio Resse, yielded notable rarities in music and early printed specimens (incunables), as well as Shakespeare folios and editions of Homer, Dante, and Horace.

To focus its own collecting and to avoid the duplication of resources in Chicago at large, the Newberry entered into a cooperative agreement in 1896 with the Chicago Public Library and the John Crerar Library, by which each institution would specialize in certain fields of knowledge and areas of service. As a consequence, the Newberry came to specialize in the humanities, and the natural sciences became the province of the Crerar. The Newberry immediately transferred to the Crerar its holdings in this area, including its copy of Audubon's Birds of America. The Newberry's medical department was transferred to the Crerar in 1906.

== President and Librarian ==
Since its founding in 1887, the Newberry Library has had ten president and librarians and one interim president and librarian.

- William F. Poole (1887–1894)
- John Vance Cheney (1894–1909)
- W. N. C. Carlton (1909–1920)
- George Burwell Utley (1920–1942)
- Stanley Pargellis (1942–1962)
- Lawrence William Towner (1962–1986)
- Charles T. Cullen (1986–2005)
- David Spadafora (2005–2019)
- Daniel Greene (2019–2023)
- Gail Kern Paster (interim president and librarian, April–October 2023)
- Astrida Orle Tantillo (December 2023–current, first female president)

== Newberry Library Award ==
In 1987, the Newberry established the Newberry Library Award in honor of its 100th anniversary. The award is an honor bestowed to individuals, and in the case of the Andrew W. Mellon Foundation, organizations, who have made "outstanding contributions to the humanities, particularly in fields of endeavor related to the Newberry's collection." The award itself is a scale-sized model of the full-sized Virginio Ferrari sculpture created in 1987 called Umanitá that greets visitors as they enter the Newberry Library.

- 1987: Paul Oskar Kristeller
- 1990: Jaroslav Pelikan
- Richard J. Franke
- Ann Ida Gannon
- Lawrence Stone
- 2006: Hanna Holborn Gray
- 2007: Richard M. Daley
- 2008: Anthony Grafton
- 2009: William Cronon
- 2010: Jonathan Spence
- 2011: Robert Darnton
- 2012: Francis Christopher Oakley
- 2013: David McCullough
- 2014: Roger Baskes
- 2015: Stacy Schiff
- 2016: Andrew W. Mellon Foundation
- 2017: Martin E. Marty
- 2018: Carla Hayden
- 2019: Marilynne Robinson
- 2021: Lonnie G. Bunch III
- 2022: Ira Glass and This American Life
- 2023: Ken Burns
- 2024: Drew Gilpin Faust
- 2025: Henry Louis Gates Jr.

== The Pattis Family Foundation Chicago Book Award at the Newberry Library ==
The Pattis Family Foundation Chicago Book Award at the Newberry Library is presented annually to a book that transforms public understanding of Chicago, its history, or its people. The prize, established in 2021 by The Pattis Family Foundation in partnership with the Newberry Library, brings attention to publications that advance greater insight into the city among a general readership while resonating with the Newberry's collections related to the history and people of Chicago. The award-winning author(s) will receive a prize of $25,000.

2022 awardee:

Dawn Turner, Three Girls from Bronzeville (Simon & Schuster)

2022 shortlist recipients:

- Elly Fishman, Refugee High: Coming of Age in America (The New Press)
- Tim Samuelson, Louis Sullivan's Idea (Alphawood Foundation; distributed by University of Minnesota Press). Edited and designed by Chris Ware
- William Sites, Sun Ra's Chicago: Afrofuturism and the City (University of Chicago Press)
- Carl Smith, Chicago's Great Fire: The Destruction and Resurrection of an Iconic American City (Atlantic Monthly Press)

2023 awardee:

Toya Wolfe, Last Summer on State Street (William Morrow)

2023 shortlist recipient:

Heather Hendershot, When the News Broke: Chicago 1968 and the Polarizing of America (University of Chicago Press)

2024 awardee:

Thomas Leslie, Chicago Skyscrapers, 1934–1986: How Technology, Politics, Finance, and Race Reshaped the City (University of Illinois Press)

2024 shortlist recipient:

John William Nelson, Muddy Ground: Native Peoples, Chicago's Portage, and the Transformation of a Continent (University of North Carolina Press)

== See also ==
- Atlas of Historical County Boundaries
- Bughouse Square Debates
- Newbery Medal, an unrelated award
