= Rare Book School =

- Founded: 1983
- Founder: Terry Belanger
- Type: Educational
- Location: University of Virginia
- Origins: Columbia University
- Key people: Michael F. Suarez; Barbara Heritage
- Website: www.rarebookschool.org

Rare Book School (RBS) is an institute dedicated to educating its students in bibliography, book history, printing, digital humanities, and more. Founded at the Columbia University School of Library Service in 1983 by Terry Belanger, RBS had humble beginnings as a small collection of courses offered through Belanger’s bibliographical laboratory called the Book Arts Press (BAP) which he founded in 1972. In 1992, it moved its headquarters to Alderman Library (now Shannon Library) at the University of Virginia (UVA) where it remains today. Belanger retired as director of RBS at the end of August 2009; his successor is Michael F. Suarez, S.J.

RBS's courses are mainly hosted at its headquarters in Charlottesville, VA, but it also offers courses remotely and in-person at partner institutes in New York City, Washington, D.C., and Baltimore, Maryland. In addition to its typical courses, RBS hosts public events such as lectures which are open to students and community members. RBS went from hosting eight courses during its first Summer Session at Columbia to now providing about forty summer courses every year. Each non-credit summer course lasts five days and usually contains twelve or fewer students; they are all taught by prestigious scholars and professionals in their respective disciplines. The courses are intensive with an expectation of full-time participation and attendance. The courses offered each year have varying requirements regarding levels of educational and professional achievement, and they cater to a wide range of disciplines including library sciences, education, antiquarian book collection, and more. New applications for each course are allowed until the enrollment limit has been reached by accepted students.

RBS is an independent, non-profit, and tax-exempt organization headed by its own board of directors. The school is committed to keeping its courses accessible and offers several scholarships and fellowships. As a continuing education institute, RBS expects a wide range of ages, backgrounds, and experience levels in its cohort.

== History and mission ==
In 1999, $50,000 was bequeathed to RBS in Robert Dougan's will. As a result, RBS could establish an endowment. Then, in 2000, RBS initiated its first scholarship program using donations made in memory of James Davis, a summer staff member who died that February.

In 2002, RBS's Board of Directors attained direct ownership over the school's assets after it attained 501(c)(3) designation from the IRS.

Institutions like the Book History Workshop in Lyon, France (2001), the Australasian Rare Book School (2005), California Rare Book School (2006), and London Rare Book School (2007) emerged following RBS's model. Meanwhile, RBS extended its own reach across the United States. RBS expanded into the Morgan Library & Museum and the Grolier Club in New York City; the Walters Art Museum in Baltimore; and the Smithsonian Institution in Washington, D.C.

In 2005, Terry Belanger was awarded a $500,000 grant from the MacArthur Fellows Program. When Belanger stepped down as director in August of 2009, RBS students, alumni, and staff donated over $110,000 towards initiating a Directors' Scholarship Fund in his honor. Belanger was succeeded by RBS current executive director, Michael F. Suarez, S.J.

In 2011, the UVA Alumni Association's Jefferson Trust awarded RBS a grant that enabled them to offer RBS-UVA Fellowships to UVA students that still exist today. In 2012, the Andrew W. Mellon Foundation began supporting RBS's Society of Fellows in Critical Bibliography, a program aimed towards the education and training of doctoral candidates, postdoctoral fellows, and junior faculty in the humanities.

In 2022, the RBS headquarters underwent a $160 million renovation on the second floor of UVA's Edgar Shannon Library where it remains today.

At UVA, RBS supports courses concerning the history of the book and related subjects. The majority of these courses are offered in Charlottesville, but courses are also currently offered in New York City (at the Grolier Club and at The Morgan Library & Museum), in Baltimore (at the Walters Art Museum and Johns Hopkins University, in Washington, DC (at the Freer Gallery of Art/Arthur M. Sackler Gallery), in Cambridge, MA (at Houghton Library), in New Haven, CT (at the Beinecke Rare Book & Manuscript Library), and in Bloomington, IN (at the Lilly Library). Many of its faculty are world-renowned in their field, and it has extensive teaching collections. Its students apply competitively for admission to the school's five-day courses. RBS students include curators and rare book librarians, established and young academics, antiquarian booksellers, book conservators and binders, and book collectors. The school employs a course evaluation system in which attendees write detailed prose accounts of their experience at the school. Their comments are then posted anonymously on the school's web site.

== Collections and exhibitions ==
RBS has a collection of printing presses and equipment that includes a replica eighteenth-century wooden rolling press (constructed according to plans in Diderot's Encyclopédie), a 19th-century Washington iron hand-press (such presses could be broken down and loaded into a Conestoga wagon), and a 20th-century flatbed cylinder proof press (a Vandercook SP-15, favorite of modern private-press letterpress printers). RBS staff also run printing demonstrations on a full-scale reproduction of a wooden common press (of the sort Benjamin Franklin might have used) owned by UVA. RBS's printing-house comprises 200 cases of printing type (including the 48-case Annenberg collection of wood type), a small Brand etching press, and various pieces of hand bookbinding equipment.

RBS owns about 80,000 books and 20,000 prints, as well as a smaller collection of manuscript materials dating from 300 BCE to the present. Many of the books are on display in the McGregor Room of UVA's Shannon Library. Other collections are kept in RBS's classrooms to facilitate the hands-on student use of materials ranging from a third-century BCE Egyptian papyrus fragment to 21st-century born-digital material.

In 2022, Rare Book School held an exhibition at the Grolier Club: Building the Book from the Ancient World to the Present Day: Five Decades of Rare Book School & the Book Arts Press. Curated by Barbara Heritage (RBS Miranker Family Director of Collections, Exhibitions & Scholarly Initiatives) and Ruth-Ellen St. Onge (formerly RBS Associate Curator and Special Collections Librarian), the show (held from September 28 through December 23) included more than 200 items drawn from RBS's teaching collections; an online version of the exhibition is freely available. Stories about the exhibition have appeared in Forbes and the New York Times. (UVA Today also ran a story about the exhibition). Forbes described the show and its accompanying book as “a comprehensive primer on how . . . objects can be read by careful observation of physical attributes, and how the reading experience can be enriched by taking into account more than the printed matter.”

The physical arrangement of the RBS book and print collection supports both classroom and independent study. The books are generally shelved by date (rather than by author or subject), to show the chronological development of parchment, leather, cloth, and paper bindings. Many of the prints are filed by technique (rather than by artist or engraver), to facilitate the identification of illustration processes. Other RBS collection arrangements assist the study of various formats, genres, materials, and physical features such as sewing structures, endpapers, and dust-jackets. An unusual feature of some of these collections is the presence of multiple copies (sometimes as many as a dozen or more) of the same (or almost the same) book—a duplication valuable not only for facilitating group viewing in the classroom but also for demonstrating the bibliographical principle that almost exactly the same can be another way of saying quite different.

RBS also maintains a library of about 2,000 recently published books on various aspects of the history of the book: paper making, typefounding, typography, printing, illustration, binding, publishing, bookselling, collecting, the antiquarian book trade, and related areas. This non-circulating reference collection ensures that the most useful books for RBS's purposes are always close at hand. Supplementing this library are much larger holdings on the same subjects in UVA's main stacks and in various UVA special collections.

== Scholarships and fellowships ==
Two main categories of Rare Book School scholarships are available: those awarded by RBS and those conducted through partner organizations. There are several types of scholarships awarded by RBS each fall, all of which students may use toward an RBS course. Several other bibliographical organizations generously offer scholarships toward RBS course tuition. Each partner organization has its own criteria and selection process; however, eligibility may be contingent on admission to an RBS course.

There are several competitive fellowships available at Rare Book School with various requirements for eligibility. These include the Andrew W. Mellon Society of Fellows in Critical Bibliography and the M. C. Lang Fellowship in Book History, Bibliography, and Humanities Teaching with Historical Sources.

== Public events ==
Rare Book School hosts various in-person and online events throughout the year, which are free and usually open to the public, including (but not limited to) a summer lecture series, fellowship symposia, book launch parties, and exhibitions that present materials drawn from RBS teaching collections.

== Website and social media ==
Rare Book School's website contains a variety of materials of potential interest to those who wish to pursue the study of the history of the book and related fields, whether independently or within a classroom setting. All RBS courses have advance reading lists, freely available to all who wish to consult them, whether admitted to a course or not. The school's faculty directory provides information about many prominent scholars of book history and related subjects.

The website serves as a gateway to RBS’s many YouTube video recordings and Soundcloud audio recordings. RBS is also active on Facebook, Instagram, LinkedIn, and Bluesky.

== Governance ==
During its Columbia University years, RBS had no independent existence; it was part of the university's School of Library Service. When the library school closed in 1992 and RBS moved to the University of Virginia, the school became a non-profit corporation in Virginia. RBS was granted tax-exempt (501(c)(3)) status by the Internal Revenue Service in 2002, and UVA's Alumni Fund, which had held RBS's assets in trust since 1992, turned them over to the RBS Board of Directors, and the school became fully independent. In 2007, RBS was granted Affiliated Foundation status by UVA's Board of Visitors.

== Succession ==
In 2007, RBS director Terry Belanger announced that he planned to step down as director of RBS in 2009. In the summer of 2008, UVA and RBS established a joint search committee chaired by Beverly P. Lynch to find a successor. On June 18, 2009, UVA President John T. Casteen III announced that Michael F. Suarez, S.J. had accepted appointments as University Professor and Professor of English at UVA and as director of RBS, effective September 1, 2009.

== Financial support ==
RBS is financially supported by the Friends of Rare Book School, a group of individuals, foundations, and organizations who contribute monetary and in-kind donations throughout RBS’s fiscal year, which runs from October to the following September.

At the beginning of 2006, RBS embarked on the public phase of a $2 million endowment campaign (the endowment then stood at about $150,000). The campaign was supported by a challenge grant from the National Endowment for the Humanities, awarded in June 2006, and by a bequest from the late Mary Ann O'Brian Malkin. The first phase of the campaign ended in December 2008, having raised $1 million in NEH matching funds.

RBS’s eight-year capital campaign, “Bound for the Future,” came to its conclusion in 2023. This largest-ever campaign in RBS's history raised $23,609,521 in philanthropic support from more than 1,300 donors, 615 of whom donated for the first time.

In October 2024, Rare Book School received a groundbreaking $3.1 million donation, from Cathy and Glen Miranker, to endow a full-time curatorial chair for the RBS teaching collection and exhibitions program. It was the largest single gift in RBS’s history.
