= Joan Judge =

Professor in the Department of History at York University

Professor Joan Judge

Academic background
- Education: B.A., University of Alberta; M.A., PhD, 1993, Columbia University
- Thesis: Print and politics: Shibao (The Eastern Times) and the formation of the public sphere in late Qing China, 1904-1911 (1993)

Academic work
- Discipline: History
- Sub-discipline: Chinese women's history
- Institutions: York University

Joan Judge FRSC is a Professor in the Department of History at York University. She was elected a Fellow of the Royal Society of Canada in 2018. Her academic focus is on Chinese history.

== Education ==
Judge earned her Bachelor of Arts from the University of Alberta before attending Columbia University for her Master's degree and PhD. Her dissertation was titled "Print and politics: Shibao (The Eastern Times) and the formation of the public sphere in late Qing China, 1904-1911." ProQuest listed her dissertation as one of the most accessed dissertations and theses of December 2013.

== Career ==
In 1998, Judge was hired by the University of California, Santa Barbara, as a professor in their history department. In February 2001, she was one of six women granted Academic tenure by the university. Judge stayed at the University of California, Santa Barbara until 2005 when she earned a position at York University as an Associate Professor in the Department of History and the Division of Humanities.

In 2008, while working as a faculty associate in the York Centre for Asian Research, Judge published her book "The Precious Raft of History: The Past, the West, and the Woman Question in China." Her book discussed how conflicting ideals of femininity, based on Chinese history, continues to shape ideas of femininity in contemporary society.

On March 22, 2011, Judge became a full professor at York University. The following year, Judge coordinated with Professor Hu Ying to publish a collection of essays regarding ancient women's biographical accounts under the title "Beyond Exemplar Tales: Women’s Biography in Chinese History."

Judge later published a book through the University of California Press titled "Republican Lens: Gender, Visuality, and Experience in the Early Chinese Periodical Press," which examined the early Republican China print culture. Her book was subsequently shortlisted for the 2016 Ferguson Prize. She was also honoured by York University with the 2016-2017 Faculty of Liberal Arts & Professional Studies Award for Distinction in Research.

On August 19, 2018, Judge was one of three professors from York University to earn a Massey College Visiting Scholarship. However, the following month she announced she was taking a sabbatical leave to focus on her project "In Search of the Chinese Common Reader: Usable Knowledge and Wondrous Ignorance in the Age of Global Science, 1890-1955." On September 13, Judge was elected a Fellow of the Royal Society of Canada.

== Publications ==
The following is a list of publications:

- Print and Politics: ‘Shibao’and the Culture of Reform in Late Qing China (1996)
- The Precious Raft of History: The Past, the West, and the Woman Question in China (2008)
- Beyond exemplar tales: women's biography in Chinese history (2011)
- Republican Lens: Gender, Visuality, and Experience in the Early Chinese Periodical Press (2015)
