= Hellmut Lehmann-Haupt =

German-American author and academic (1903–1992)

Hellmut Otto Emil Lehmann-Haupt (1903 – March 11, 1992) was a German-American author, academic, bibliography expert, and rare books expert. After World War II, he worked with the Monuments, Fine Arts, and Archives program, commonly known as the Monuments Men.

== Early life ==
Hellmut Emil Lehmann-Haupt was born in Berlin in 1903. His mother was a playwright and his father was a professor of ancient history at the University of Berlin. He was educated in a number of countries, including England and Turkey. He attended the University of Berlin and the University of Vienna, majoring in the fine arts. He received a Ph.D. from the University of Frankfurt in 1927. His dissertation was on early book illustration.

== Career ==
After his doctoral studies, Lehmann-Haupt spent time as a rare book dealer and assistant curator at the Gutenberg Museum in Mainz from 1927 to 1929. He immigrated to the United States in 1929 and started working for the Encyclopædia Britannica as an indexing editor. He was also a proofreader for the New York editorial house Marchbanks Press.

In 1930, he was named curator of the rare book department of the Columbia University Library, and in 1938 he was appointed assistant professor of book arts in the School of Library Services. In this capacity he taught, conducted research, and wrote books and articles. He also worked at the Morgan Library and was a visiting lecturer at the University of Illinois and Smith College.

During World War II, Lehmann-Haupt served in London from 1944 to 1945, first as deputy chief of the U.S. German Policy Desk of the U.S. Office of War Information and then as psychological warfare officer at Supreme Headquarters, Allied Expeditionary Force (SHAEF). After the defeat of Germany, Lehmann-Haupt was transferred to Berlin, where he served as a civil arts liaison officer and art intelligence officer for the MFAA. He became friends with German artists Karl Hofer, Max Kaus, and Karl Schmidt-Rotloff who were suppressed under Hitler's rule and helped reestablish their careers. He studied the impact of the Nazi's strict control of the arts on German society.

As part of his work in Berlin, Lehmann-Haupt was the first to analyze the records of the SS Ahnenerbe, revealing Heinrich Himmler’s archaeological activities in the USSR and Poland. Later, he wrote about this subject in Art Under a Dictatorship which was published in 1954.

From 1950 to 1968, he was a bibliographical consultant and, later, chief bibliography expert for rare books and a manuscript dealer H. P. Kraus. While with Kraus, he authenticated and wrote a catalogue of the Constance Missal. In 1954 and 1955, Lehmann-Haupt taught bibliography at the Pratt Institute. From 1965 to 1967, he was a research associate at Yale University, followed by teaching at the University of Missouri from 1969 to 1974. He became a professor emeritus when he retired from the University of Missouri in 1974.

== Select publications ==
By 1959, Lehmann-Haupt had more than 200 publications.

- Lehmann-Haupt, Hellmut, and Columbia University. Library. Rare Books in the university. [publisher not identified], 1936.
- Fifty Books About Bookmaking. New York: Columbia University Press, 1933.
- The Book in America. New York: R. R. Bowker Company, 1939
- Seventy Books About Bookmaking. New York: Columbia University Press, 1941
- One Hundred Books About Bookmaking. New York: Columbia University Press, 1949
- Art Under a Dictatorship. Oxford, 1954
- The Life of the Book: How the Book is Written, Published, Printed, Sold and Read. London: Abelard-Schuman, 1975. ISBN 9780837182933
- The Gottingen Model Book: A Facsimile Edition and Translations of a Fifteenth-Century Illuminators' Manual. University of Missouri Press, 1979. ISBN 9780826201027

== Awards and honors ==
- Gutenberg Prize of the International Gutenberg Society and the City of Mainz (Germany, 1980)
- Lehmann-Haupt's papers are housed in the archives of the Museum of Modern Art in New York.

== Personal life ==
Lehmann-Haupt married three times; his third wife was Ingeborg. He had a daughter, Roxanna, and four sons, Alexander, Carl, Christopher, and John.

In 1992, Lehmann-Haupt died in Columbia, Missouri of congestive heart failure at the age of 82.
