= Fellatio (disambiguation) =

Fellatio, an act of oral stimulation of a penis by a sexual partner. Also known as blow job, BJ, fellation, giving head, or sucking off.

Autofellatio, the act of oral stimulation of one's own penis as a form of masturbation

Fellatio may also refer to:

== Films and television ==
- "Vehicular Fellatio", title of episode 2 of season 7 of the television series Curb Your Enthusiasm (See List of episodes)

== Literature ==
- "Fellatio" one of four sections in Oragenitalism, a 1969 book authored by American folklorist Gershon Legman, the other three sections being "Cunnilinctus", "Irrumation", and "Sixty-Nine"
- Fellatio, Masochism, Politics and Love, a book by Leo Abse

== Music ==
- Txus di Fellatio, drummer of Spanish band Mägo de Oz
- Machine Gun Fellatio, a musical band
- Mother Fellatio, an EP by Japanese band The Gerogerigegege
- "Fellatio", a song by DJ Deviance
- "Fellatio", a song by Danish artist L.O.C.
