= Brussel =

Brussel is a surname. Notable people with the surname include:

- Betty Brussel (born 1924), Dutch-Canadian competitive swimmer
- James A. Brussel (fl. 1956), pioneer of offender profiling
- Jacob Brussel (1899–1979), antiquarian bookseller and publisher in New York City

== See also ==
- Van Brussel
