= Jacob Brussel =

American bookseller & publisher (1899–1979)

Jacob R. Brussel (June 21, 1899 – October 1979) was an antiquarian bookseller and publisher in New York City whose firm J.R. Brussel also dealt in erotica. For many years Jake Brussel operated a shop, under various names including Atlantis and Ortelius, on New York's famous Fourth Avenue "Book Row", initially in partnership with Samuel Weiser as "Weiser's Book Shop" until Weiser moved out to open his own shop across the street. He published large numbers of erotic and sexological reprints of works in the public domain in small editions, employing a job printer in a cellar around the corner, as well as the unauthorized bootleg "Medvsa" edition of Tropic of Cancer by Henry Miller and Oragenitalism by Gershon Legman, a young employee in the Brussel bookshop. Others who worked in the shop in this era included Sol M. Malkin, (later the founder of AB Bookman's Weekly), Keene Wallis, and Mahlon Blaine. In June 1928, Malkin, then a 19-year old clerk, was arrested in a police raid on the premises led by John Sumner, in which 1,500 books were seized. At that time the store was called the Ortelius Book Shop and was located at 134 E. 8th St., across the street from Wanamaker's. The shop's book scout was Jake's brother, I.R. "Ike" Brussel, a book hunter billed as "the last of the great scouts". In early 1940, the shop was raided by police and Brussel was sentenced to three years in jail on obscenity charges. After WWII, he carried on the storefront business while focusing largely on publishing under various imprints, including Brussel and Brussel, New York Medical Press, and United Book Guild.

== Sources ==
- Mikita Brottman, Funny peculiar: Gershon Legman and the psychopathology of humor, Routledge, 2004, ISBN 0-88163-404-2, pp. 5–7,31
- Alexander Cockburn, Jeffrey St. Clair, Serpents in the garden: liaisons with culture & sex, AK Press, 2004, ISBN 1-902593-94-4, pp. 255–256
- Lawrence J. Shifreen, Roger Jackson, Henry Miller: a bibliography of primary sources, Alyscamps Press, 1993, pp. 11–12
