= Rationale of the Dirty Joke =

1968 book by Gershon Legman

Rationale of the Dirty Joke: An Analysis of Sexual Humor
- Author: Gershon Legman
- Language: English
- Genre: Non-fiction
- Publisher: Grove Press, Simon & Schuster
- Publication date: 1968
- Publication place: United States

Rationale of the Dirty Joke: An Analysis of Sexual Humor is a book by American social critic and folklorist Gershon Legman. The book analyzes more than 2000 jokes and folk tales in terms of social, psychological, and historical significance. It was first published by Grove Press in 1968, was later reprinted in hard-cover by Indiana University, and was years out of print until reissued by Simon & Schuster in 2006. The second volume, No Laughing Matter: Rationale of the Dirty Joke: An Analysis of Sexual Humor, 2nd Series, had to be paid for by subscription to support publishing, as it was the "dirty dirties".

According to literary critic Mikita Brottman, "Contemporary humor theorists now ... give a warm, good-natured cast to the telling of jokes, without the nastiness and aggression that Legman -- and, indeed, Freud -- regard as an integral part of the joke-telling enterprise."

There were several reviews of the book published in 1969. Brottman suggests, however, "all its reviewers seem to have misunderstood ... that the point of the book ... is trying to understand what the dirty joke itself is trying to explain".

== See also ==
- Off-color humor
- Black comedy
- Ribaldry
- Toilet humour
