= Irrumatio =

Type of oral sex

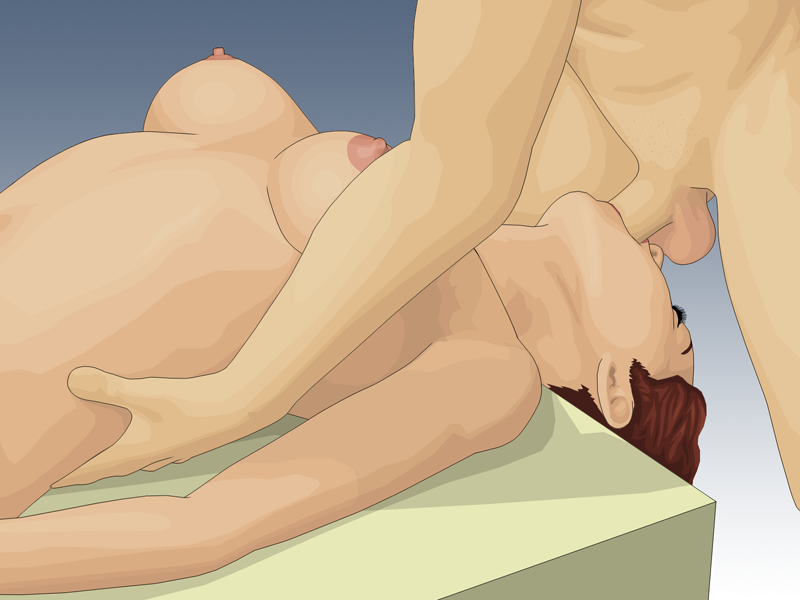
An illustration of a woman being irrumated by a man

Irrumatio (also known as irrumation or by the colloquialism face-fucking) is a form of oral sex in which a person thrusts their penis into another person's mouth, in contrast to fellatio where the penis is being actively orally excited by a fellator. The difference lies mainly in which party takes the active part. By extension, irrumatio can also refer to the sexual technique of thrusting the penis between the thighs of a partner (intercrural sex).

In the ancient Roman sexual vocabulary, irrumatio is often treated as a form of oral rape (os impurum), in which a man forces his penis into someone else's mouth.

== Etymology and history ==
The English nouns irrumatio and irrumation, and the verb irrumate, come from the Latin irrumāre, meaning to force receptive male oral sex. J. L. Butrica, in his review of R. W. Hooper's edition of The Priapus Poems, a corpus of poems known as Priapeia in Latin, states that "some Roman sexual practices, like irrumatio, lack simple English equivalents".

There is some conjecture among linguists, as yet unresolved, that irrŭmātio may be connected with the Latin word rūmen, rūminis, the throat and gullet, whence 'ruminate', to chew the cud, therefore meaning 'insertion into the throat'. Others connect it with rūma or rūmis, an obsolete word for a teat, hence it would mean "giving milk", "giving to suck". (Compare the word fellō, which literally meant "suck (milk)" before it acquired its sexual sense.)

As the quotation from Butrica suggests and an article by W. A. Krenkel shows, irrumatio was regarded as a distinct sexual practice in ancient Rome. J. N. Adams states that "it was a standard joke to speak of irrumatio as a means of silencing someone". Oral sex was considered to be an act of defilement: the mouth had a particularly defined role as the organ of oratory, as in Greece, to participate in the central public sphere, where discursive powers were of great importance. Thus, to penetrate the mouth could be taken to be a sign of massive power differential within a relationship. Erotic art from Pompeii depicts irrumatio along with fututio, fellatio and cunnilingus, and pedicatio or anal sex.

Wall paintings depicting explicit sex often appear in bathhouses and brothels, and oral sex was something usually practiced with prostitutes because of their low status. Craig A. Williams argues that irrumatio was regarded as a degrading act, even more so than anal rape. S. Tarkovsky states that, while popular, it was thought to be a hostile act, "taken directly from the Greek, whereby the Greek men would have to force the fellatio by violence". Furthermore, as Amy Richlin has shown in an article in the Journal of the History of Sexuality, it was also accepted as "oral rape", a punitive act among men. Catullus threatens two friends who have insulted him with both irrumatio and pedicatio in his Carmen 16, although the use could also mean "go to hell," rather than being a literal threat.

In modern English, the term "fellatio" has expanded to incorporate irrumatio, and the latter has fallen out of widespread use. Likewise, irrumatio might today be called "forced fellatio" or "oral rape". In modern English, especially in a non-rape context, the term "face fucking" is often used.

Another synonym for irrumatio is Egyptian rape or simply Egyptian; this goes back to the time of the Crusades when Mamluks were alleged to force their Christian captives to do this.

== Other regions ==
Peruvian erotic pottery of the Moche culture represent a form of fellatio, or more specifically irrumation, in some vases showing oragenital acts.

== See also ==
- Deep-throating
- Latin obscenity
- Pearl necklace (sexual act)

== Bibliography ==
- Legman, Gershon (1969). Oragenitalism: Oral Techniques in Genital Excitation. New York: Julian Press.
