= Hollywood Hex =

1999 book by Mikita Brottman

Hollywood Hex: Death And Destiny In The Dream Factory
- Author: Mikita Brottman
- Language: English
- Subject: film, film history, pop culture
- Publisher: Creation Books
- Publication date: 1999
- Publication place: UK
- English publication date: June 1999
- Media type: softcover
- Pages: 201
- ISBN: 1-871592-85-2
- OCLC: 978187592856
- Preceded by: Babylon Blue (Creation Cinema #12)

Hollywood Hex is a book by Mikita Brottman, an in-depth history of movies plagued with bad luck or perceived as cursed. The book deals with deaths on-set, copycat crimes, obsessed fans, bizarre coincidences, and other incidents which lead a film to be called "cursed".

== Description ==
The book's origins are in several essays by the author, Mikita Brottman. Brottman received her Ph.D. in English Language and Literature from Oxford University, taught Comparative Literature at Indiana University as a Visiting Assistant Professor, served as a professor at Shippensburg University of Pennsylvania, and is currently on the staff of the Pacifica Graduate Institute. Brottman's writings on film and film culture have appeared in Film Quarterly, Literature Film Quarterly and indieWire, where she regularly covers international film festivals. The book covers "cursed movies" in a period ranging from Roman Polanski's Rosemary's Baby (1968) to The Crow (1994) with Brandon Lee.

In a 2005 interview for the Sunday Herald, Brottman defined the elements that make a "cursed movie": "A film will appear to be hexed if one or more of the stars has died after filming or during filming or if it turns out that the stars have drug or health problems or suicidal tendencies - something that the audience wasn't aware of at the time. Or if there's been an unusual pattern of co-incidences associated with the film such as a series of deaths or a series of accidents during filming."

The central section of the book, and the two films which receive the most analysis, are Polanski's Macbeth (1971), and William Friedkin's The Exorcist (1973). Polanski's Macbeth, which receives the most complete coverage, is intercut with descriptions of and parallels with the Manson Family murder of Sharon Tate, Polanski's wife. The section on The Exorcist details extreme audience reactions to the film. Films which receive shorter coverage include Twilight Zone: The Movie (1983) and Oliver Stone's Natural Born Killers (1994).

== Reception ==
A review of the book in the film and popular culture journal Images judges that Hollywood Hex is most successful in the sections covering The Exorcist and Macbeth because of not, "exploiting the subject material but in maintaining distance." Brottman's objective approach to the material gives it an academic and neutral point of view which, in a subject which could easily be sensationalized, is remarked on approvingly in the review. The reviewer, David Ng, comments, "How easy it would have been to sensationalize this material, to cheapen it with tabloidish conjectures, to dilute it with pop psychology, or to kill it with over-analysis... It is a mature book that trusts its readers to extrapolate... freely." Images points out that other films covered by the book are not done in as complete a manner as are Macbeth and The Exorcist, giving the book a somewhat disjointed quality. Ng comments, "The shorter essays... while always fascinating, seldom reach the subtle genius of the two centerpieces." Nevertheless, Brottman's academic approach to the subject is consistent throughout the book, according to Ng, who writes that she, "never short changes a movie because it was a bomb or a turkey. Poltergeist III, for instance, is scrutinized with the same level of intelligence as The Exorcist.

The Headpress Guide to the Counter Culture (2004) calls the book, "a fascinating account of murder and misadventure in Tinseltown," and an "unashamedly esoteric film book with a very entertaining premise."
