= Van Brussel =

Van Brussel is a surname. Notable people with the surname include:

- Hendrik Van Brussel (born 1944), Belgian mechanical engineer
- Henk van Brussel (1936–2007), Dutch footballer and manager
- Hermanus van Brussel (1763–1815), Dutch painter and engraver
- Marianne Van Brussel, Belgian paralympic athlete
- Paul Theodor van Brussel (1754–1795), Dutch painter

== See also ==
- Brussel, a surname
