= Book Row =

Former area in New York City

Coordinates: 40.7332°N 73.9910°W

Book Row was a district in New York City from the 1890s to the 1960s composed of six city blocks which, at its peak, contained over three dozen bookstores. Many – if not most – of the places were used bookstores. In its heyday, Book Row spanned the stretch of Fourth Avenue between Union Square and Astor Place. Other names for it included "Booksellers' Row" and "Second-Hand Row."

By the 1960s, skyrocketing rents had forced most of the bookstores to move or close. Apartments replaced most of the former storefronts. Another factor contributing to Book Row's decline was the retirements and/or deaths of the stores' original owners. By 1984, just two stores remained on Fourth Avenue. The only bookstore from Book Row that survives today is the Strand Bookstore, which moved away in 1957 due to major rent increases.

== Bookstores ==
- Argosy Book Store
- Atlantis
- Biblo & Tannen
- Dauber & Pine
- J.R. Brussel Book Shop
- Louis Schucman Bookseller
- Ortelius
- Pelican Book Shop
- The Strand Bookstore
- Weiser Antiquarian Books
- University Place Book Shop
