= Off-color humor =

Americanism used to describe jokes of a vulgar nature

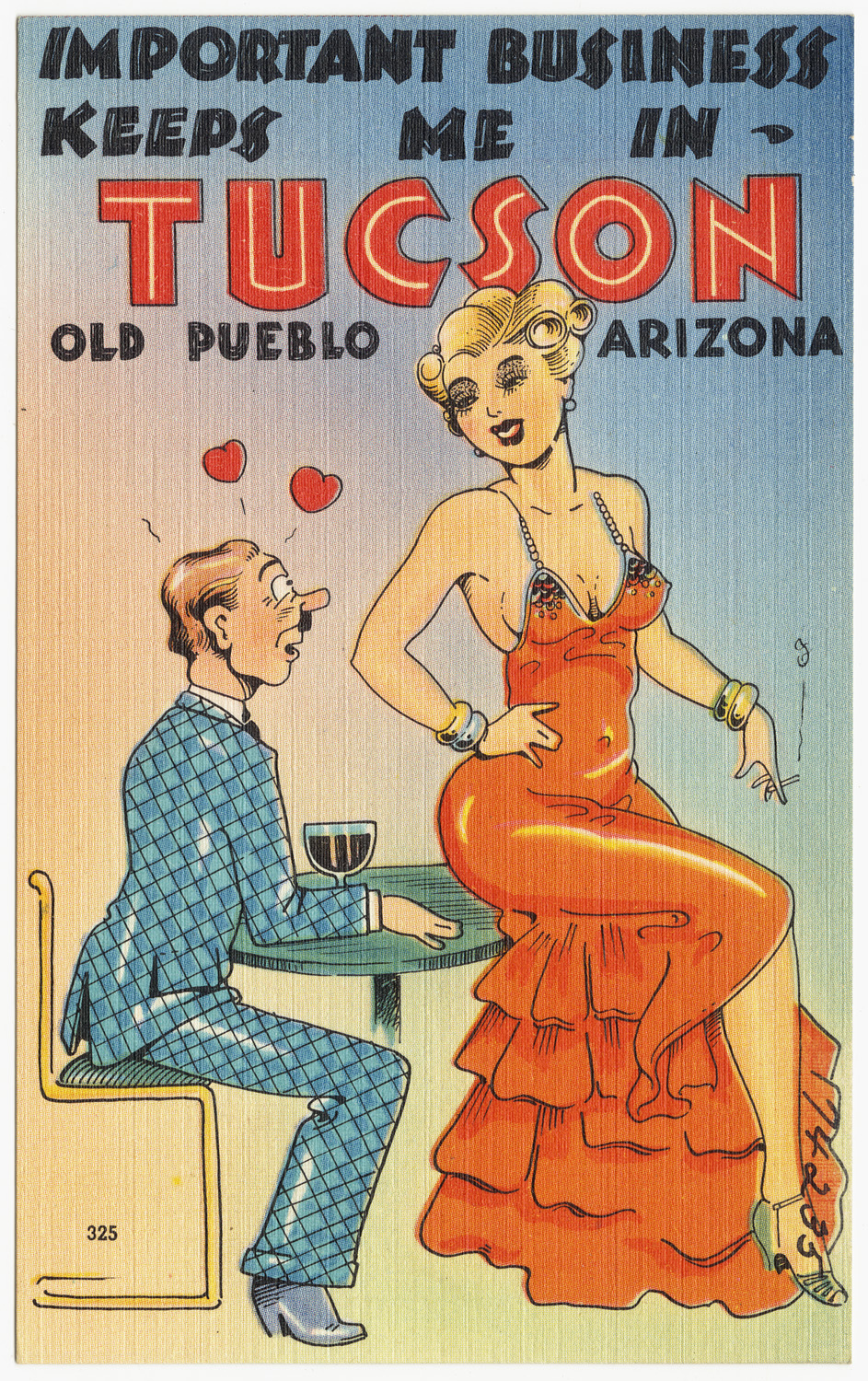
A postcard containing off-color humor

Off-color humor (also known as vulgar humor, crude humor, crass humor, coarse humor or shock humor) is humor that deals with topics that may be considered to be in poor taste or vulgar. Many comedic genres (including jokes, prose, poems, black comedy, blue comedy, insult comedy, cringe comedy and skits) may incorporate "off-color" elements.

Most commonly labeled as "off-color" are acts concerned with sex, a particular ethnic group, or gender. Other off-color topics include violence, particularly domestic abuse; excessive swearing or profanity; toilet humor; national superiority or inferiority, pedophilic content, and any topics generally considered impolite or indecent. Generally, the point of off-color humor is to induce laughter by evoking a feeling of shock and surprise in the comedian's audience. In this way, off-color humor is related to other forms of postmodern humor, such as the anti-joke.

== History ==
Off-color jokes were used in Ancient Greek comedy, including the humor of Aristophanes. His work parodied some of the great tragedians of his time, especially Euripides, using τὸ φορτικόν/ἡ κωμῳδία φορτική (variously translated as "low comedy", "vulgar farce", "disgusting, obscene farces") that received great popularity among his contemporaries.

William Shakespeare, the 16th-century playwright and poet, is well known for his ribald humor. Almost every one of his plays contains suggestive jokes and innuendo.

Jonathan Swift, an Irish satirist in the 17th century, used scatological humor in some of his pieces, including his famous essay A Modest Proposal and his rather crude poem "The Lady's Dressing Room", in which the speaker comments on the goings-on in a 17th-century woman's room, including her business in her chamber pot.

Dirty jokes were once considered subversive and underground, and rarely heard in public. Comedian Lenny Bruce was tried, convicted, and jailed for obscenity after a stand-up performance that included off-color humor in New York City in 1964. Comedian and actor Redd Foxx was well known in nightclubs in the 1960s and 1970s for his raunchy stand-up act, but toned it down for the television shows Sanford and Son and The Redd Foxx Comedy Hour, stating in the first monologue of the latter show that the only similarity between the show and his nightclub act was that "I'm smoking". American society has become increasingly tolerant of off-color humor since that time. Such forms of humor have become widely distributed and more socially acceptable, in part due to the mainstream success in the 1970s and 1980s of comedians like Peter Cook and Dudley Moore's alter-egos Derek and Clive, Dolemite, and Andrew Dice Clay. George Carlin and Richard Pryor have used it as an effective tool for social commentary.

In the 1990s and modern era, comedians such as Bill Hicks, Doug Stanhope, and Dave Chappelle have used shocking content to draw attention to their criticism of social issues, especially censorship and the socioeconomic divide. Dave Attell and Louis C.K. are noted for their absurdist off-color humor. The cartoon Beavis and Butt-head was especially off-color in its early episodes, which included numerous depictions of animal cruelty. The highly praised television show South Park also popularized the use of offensive humor, for which the show has become infamous. The Aristocrats is perhaps the most famous dirty joke in the US and is certainly one of the best-known and most oft-repeated among comedians themselves. Tom Green has used shock humor in The Tom Green Show and the film Freddy Got Fingered, using outrageous stunts and jokes to draw an audience in.

In British humor, the genre of "sick jokes" is often used to shock by poking fun at taboo or as a reaction against political correctness. Examples include the website B3ta and its accompanying book The Bumper B3ta Book of Sick Jokes, the humor wiki Sickipedia and the adult comic Viz.

== Veg and non-veg jokes ==
In some parts of the world, sexual humor in particular is known as "non-veg" humor, contrasted with the "veg" jokes that are more acceptable in polite company. The use of the term "non-veg" is probably a reference to the carnal nature of sexual humor, and can be viewed in the context of the prevalence of both vegetarian and non-vegetarian dietary preferences.

== See also ==
- Dick joke
- Ethnic jokes
- Flatulence humor
- Gross out
- Pick-up line
- Rationale of the Dirty Joke
- Ribaldry
- Rudeness
- Sex comedy
- Sophomoric humor
