= Walter Goldwater =

American bookseller (1907–1985)

- Born: July 29, 1907; Harlem, New York, USA
- Died: June 24, 1985 (aged 77); New York City, NY, USA
- Education: City College of New York; University of Michigan
- Occupation: Bookseller
- Years active: 1930–1985
- Employer: Self (owner)
- Organization: University Place Book Shop
- Known for: founding University Place Book Shop, co-founding Dissent
- Spouse: Eleanor Lowenstein
- Parent: Dr. Abraham Goldwater

Walter Goldwater (July 29, 1907 – June 24, 1985) was an American antiquarian bookseller, who worked briefly at International Publishers before founding University Place Book Shop in Manhattan, part of "Book Row". He was also a co-founder and publisher of Dissent magazine and a noted tournament chess player.

== Background ==
Walter Goldwater was born on July 29, 1907, in Harlem, New York. His father, Dr. Abraham Goldwater, was a radical and knew prominent black activists including W. E. B. DuBois. In 1927, after starting college at the City College of New York, Goldwater graduated from the University of Michigan.

== Career ==
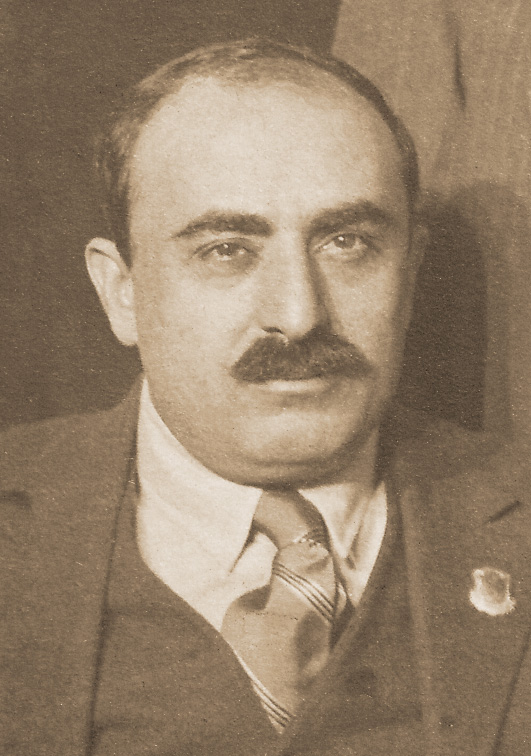
Early in his career, Goldwater worked for Alexander Trachtenberg (here, in Moscow, Fall 1922) of International Publishers.

Initially, Goldwater took clerical jobs to support himself.

In 1930, Goldwater joined International Publishers, "the most prominent communist publishing organization in the United States," run by Alexander Trachtenberg.

In 1931, Goldwater and his wife Ethel, who had joined him in studying Russian, traveled to Moscow, USSR. There, they helped set up the Cooperative Publishing Society of Foreign Workers. Both then worked there as translators and editors. Goldwater was a critic of Stalin, which landed him in trouble with authorities, after which the Goldwaters returned to New York in early 1932.

In 1932, Goldwater opened University Place Book Shop on "Book Row" at 821 Broadway at 12th Street (or at 69 University Place) with a loan from his uncle Jack Biblo (of Biblo & Tannen bookstore) of $600 (or his uncle Abe Sugarman). The bookstore specialized in African, African-American, and Caribbean (West Indies) literature as well as used, old, and rare books. Other specialties included chess, Russia, and radicalism.

In 1933, Arthur Spingarn, brother of NAACP founder Joel Spingarn, started a standing order for books by African-American authors.

Around 1932 or 1933, Whittaker Chambers tried to recruit Goldwater to open a bookstore near Columbia University to serve as a meeting place for Communist (Soviet) underground agents as well as a mail drop. Upon checking with the Communist Party USA at its headquarters on Union Square, he found the idea rejected by the Party because his knowledge of the Russian language looked suspicious. Others whom Chambers tried to recruit in the same period included: Herbert Solow, David Zabladowsky, Diana Trilling, and Robert Cantwell.

Goldwater purchased an estimated ten thousand "little magazines" (e.g., Bibelot, Black Cat, Yellow Book, and Philistine) from nearby Pratt bookshop. Over time, he sold these to universities, including Yale University and the University of Connecticut.

Goldwater helped found the Antiquarian Booksellers' Association of America and collected books printed in the 15th century.

By December 1945, he was part of the Friday Evening Discussion ran by Dwight Macdonald's politics journal in New York's Greenwich Village, along with the then fellow anti-Stalinist leftists Hannah Arendt, William Barrett, Nicola Chiaromonte, James T. Farrell, William Phillips, Philip Rahv, Harold Rosenberg and Niccolò Tucci. This was the audience to which Chiaromonte presented his denunciation of Marx's scientific path to socialism.

He had been a Socialist Workers Party and Workers Party member at some point before 1967.

Goldwater acted as the literary agent of C. L. R. James, with whom he corresponded between 1949 and 1969. In 1950, Goldwater published a new edition of W. E. B. DuBois's Black Reconstruction.

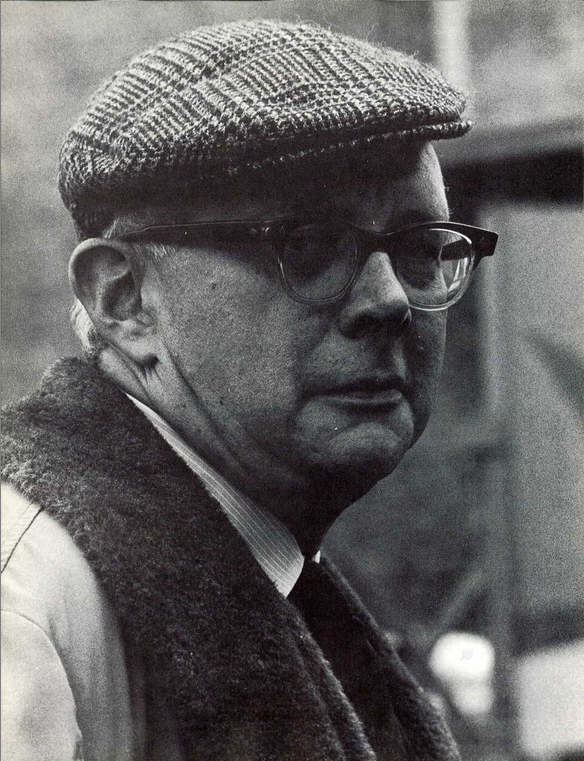
Goldwater helped found Dissent with Irving Howe (here, University of Michigan, 1967–1968)

In 1954, Goldwater joined Irving Howe and others in founding Dissent magazine, which he helped finance. He published the magazine for 15 years. In 1967, he wrote a letter criticising Howe's editorial line that justified the Vietnam War as "the decisions of the democratically elected government" and rejected the actions of the anti-war movement.

He collected and wrote about collecting Incunabula, which he later had auctioned by Swann Galleries before his death.

== Personal life and death ==
Goldwater married Eleanor Lowenstein (died 1980), who was also an antiquarian. She ran the Corner Book Shop (102 Fourth Avenue at 11th Street), which specialized in cookbooks. They had two children.

Goldwater and his friend Dwight Macdonald formed the bases for two characters in Mary McCarthy's 1949 novel The Oasis.

Goldwater was a "formidable" chess player who competed in New York tournaments and also served as president of the Marshall Chess Club in Greenwich Village. He lost to the chess champion Bobby Fischer.

In later life, Goldwater helped broker manuscripts and collections regarding labor and the left to universities, particularly the Tamiment Library at New York University.

In 1993, a long interview was published in the Dictionary of Literary Biography Yearbook, in which Goldwater recounted all the booksellers he had known in his life.

== Legacy ==
In his will, Goldwater left University Place Book Shop to long-time employee William French, who ran the shop from 1985 to 1988. French had started working at the bookstore in 1960. He left books to the New York Public Library and its Schomburg Center. University Place Book Shop closed in 1995, mostly due to rising costs and a debt of $64,000 in unpaid rent. French sold the remaining books to New York University.

== Works ==
- Radical Periodicals in America, 1890–1950: With a Genealogical Chart and a Concise Lexicon of the Parties and Groups which Issued Them: A Bibliography with Brief Notes (1964, 2nd edn. 1966, 3rd edn. 1977) (2nd edn. covers 321 journals)
- "New York City Bookshops in the 1930s and 1940s: The Recollections of Walter Goldwater", Dictionary of Literary Biography Yearbook (1993)

== See also ==
- Book Row
- Dissent magazine
