= Strand Bookstore =

Independent book store in New York City

Coordinates: 40.7333°N 73.9908°W

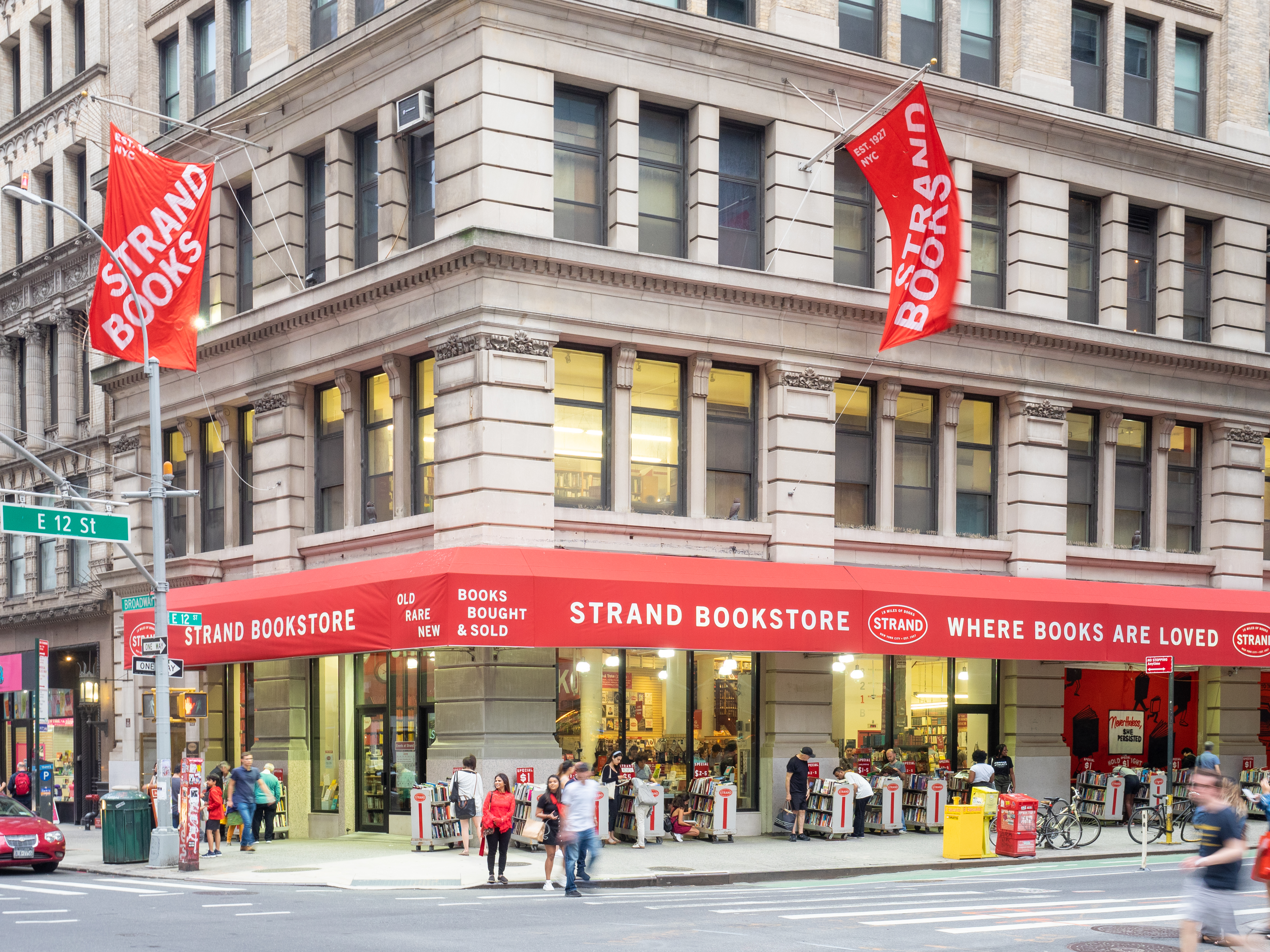
- Industry: Bookseller
- Founded: 1927
- Founder: Benjamin Bass
- Headquarters: New York City, United States
- Number of locations: 2 stores, 2 kiosks, 1 pop-up
- Area served: New York metropolitan area
- Products: New, used, and rare books
- Owner: Nancy Bass Wyden
- Number of employees: 238
- Website: strandbooks.com

The Strand Bookstore is an independent bookstore located at 828 Broadway, at the corner of East 12th Street in the East Village neighborhood of Manhattan, New York City, two blocks south of Union Square. There are additional locations at Lincoln Center and on the Upper West Side, as well as kiosks in Central Park and Times Square, and a curated shelf at Moynihan Train Hall. The company's slogan is "18 Miles Of Books", as featured on its stickers, t-shirts, and other merchandise. In 2016, The New York Times called The Strand "the undisputed king of the city’s independent bookstores".

== Description ==
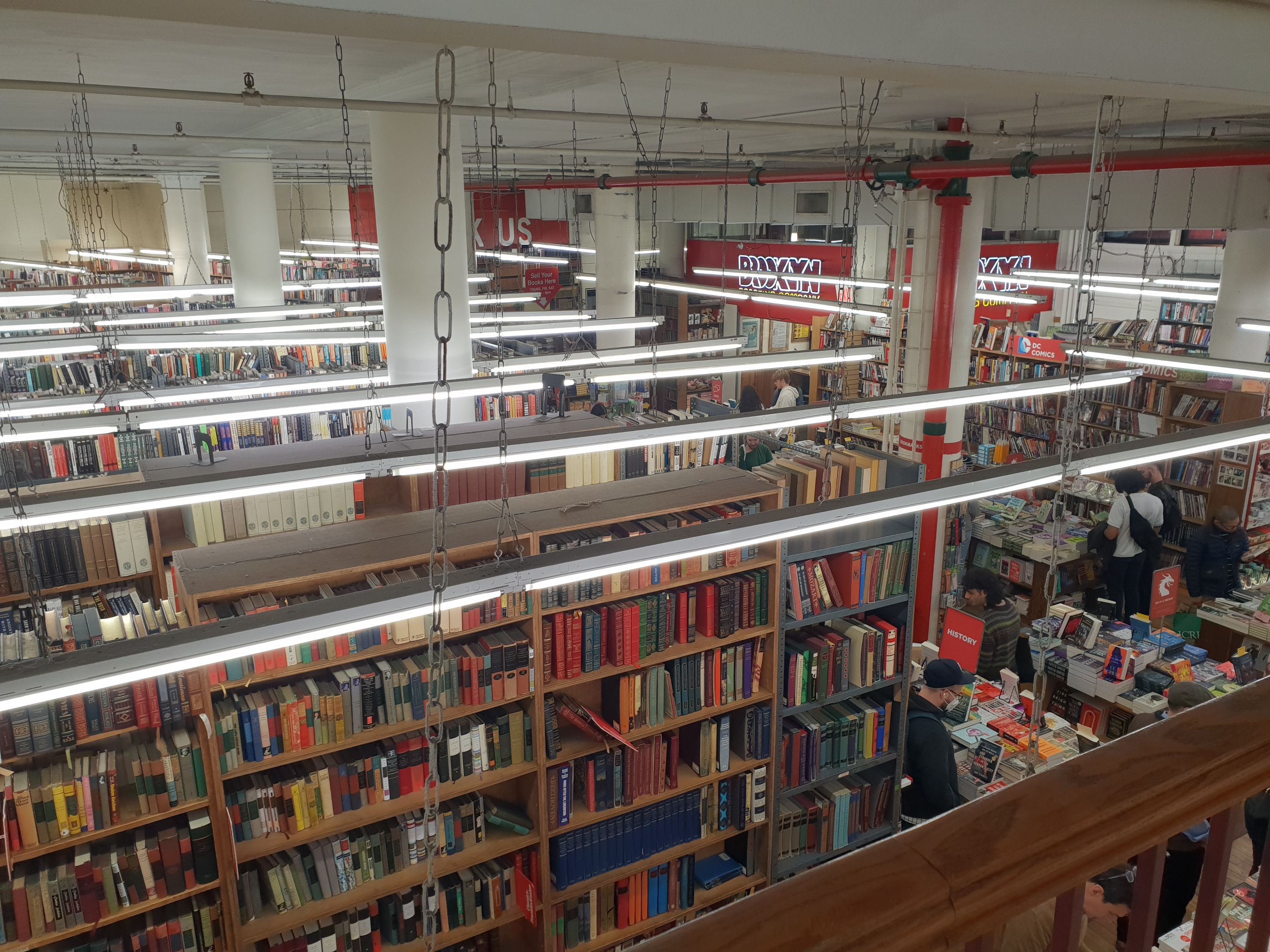
Shelves on 1st floor.

The Strand is a family-owned business with more than 230 employees. Many notable New York City artists have worked at the store, including rock musicians of the 1970s: Patti Smith – who claimed not to have liked the experience because it "wasn't very friendly" – and Tom Verlaine, who was fond of the discount book carts sitting outside the store. Other celebrity employees include Richard Hell, Neil Winokur, Adam Bellow, Sam Shepard, Mary Gaitskill, Burt Britton, Lucy Sante, Marvin Mondlin, Ken Schles, and Thomas Weatherly Jr.

The Strand has had a unionized workforce for over 35 years. On April 5, 2012, unionized workers at the store rejected a new contract; on June 15, 2012, workers ratified a new contract.

Besides the main store and Central Park kiosk, an additional location called the "Strand Book Annex" opened in the 1980s and was originally located on Front Street in the South Street Seaport complex. It moved in 1996 to Fulton and Gold Streets in the Financial District, but finally closed on September 22, 2008, due to rent increases. A branch in the Flatiron District opened in 2013, and a summer kiosk in Times Square opened in 2016. In 2020 The Strand's planned opening of its Upper West Side location was postponed due to the COVID-19 pandemic.

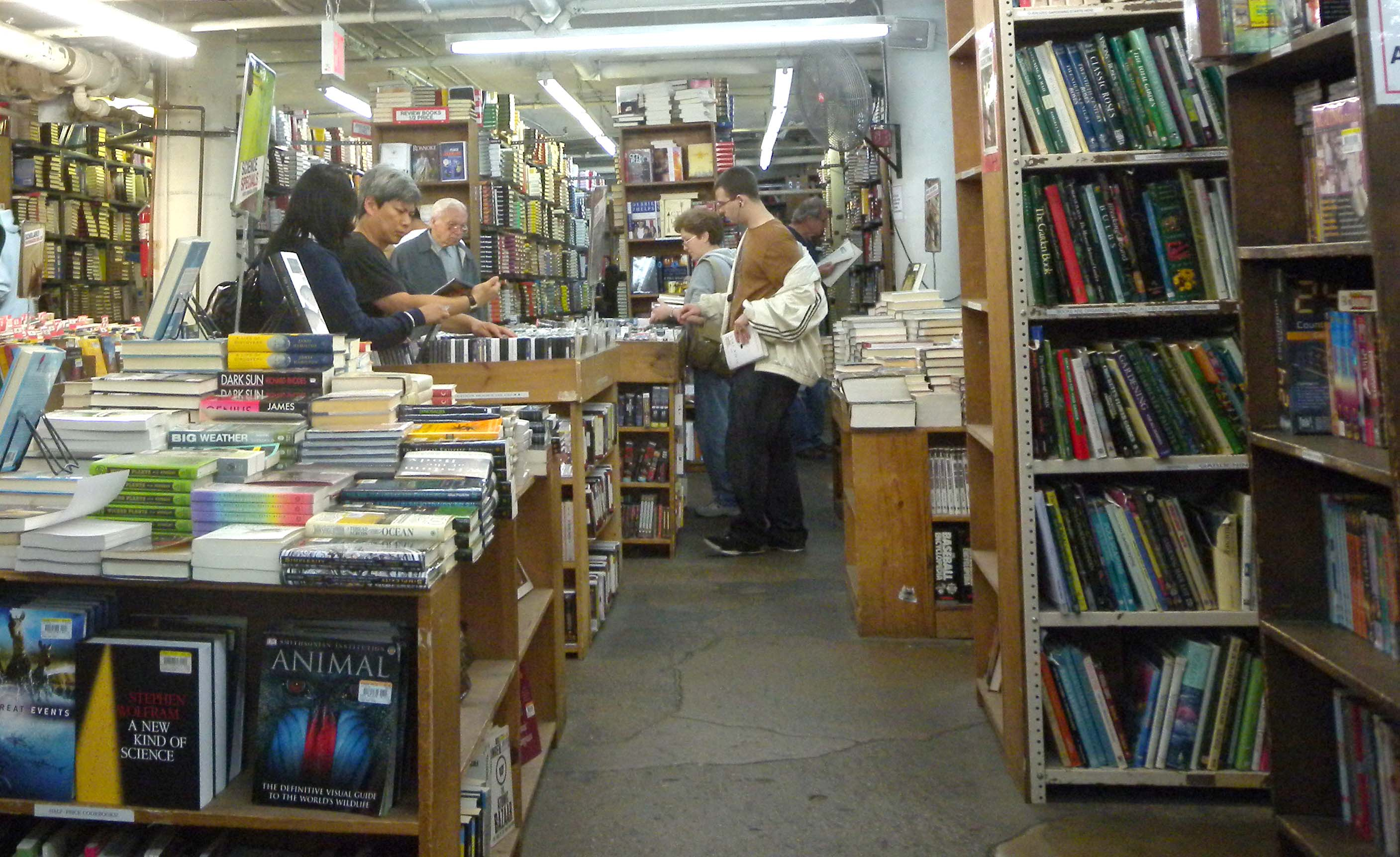
The Strand's basement holds its collection of review copies of recently published books

In 2005, the main store underwent a major renovation and expansion, with the addition of an elevator, air conditioning, and a re-organization of the floors to make browsing easier for shoppers. It also began to sell discounted new books and non-book merchandise.

The bookstore had 70,000 books in its early years, which increased by the mid-1960s to 500,000. By the 1990s it had 2.5 million books, which necessitated the renting of a warehouse in Sunset Park, Brooklyn. At that time, the oldest book for sale in the Strand was an edition of Magna Moralia, which was priced at $4,500. The most expensive book is a copy of James Joyce's Ulysses at $38,000. While the store continues to boast the slogan, "18 miles of books," it now houses over "23 miles" of books.

== History ==
Benjamin Bass was an emigrant from Lithuania who came to the United States when he was 17. He worked as a messenger, salesman and subway construction worker before he came across the used-book district on Fourth Avenue between Astor Place and Union Square. His first bookstore was the Pelican Book Shop on Eighth Street near Greene Street. However, the store was not a success, and Bass next opened the Strand – named after the street in London – in 1927 with $300 in his own savings and $300 he borrowed; early on, he slept on a cot in the store. The new store was able to survive the Depression by use of Bass's extensive network of contacts. Furthermore, his landlord was the last of the city's noted Stuyvesant family, which carried the store through its lean years when Bass could not pay his rent; Bass later paid back the debt, and agreed to a schedule of voluntary rent increases during rent controls which were instituted with World War II. After rent controls ended, the Stuyvesant interests doubled the rents on their other properties, but not on the Strand.

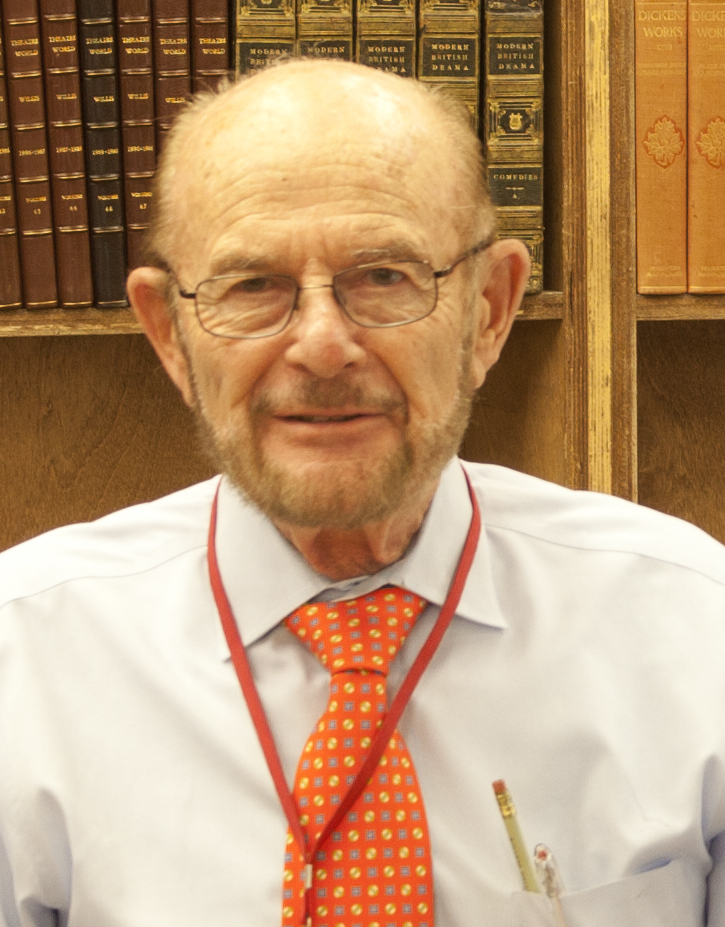
Fred Bass in 2013

The Strand was then located on Fourth Avenue, which had at the time 48 bookstores, in what was known as "Book Row", which was established as early as 1890. These started to disappear around the 1930s due to the Great Depression and again in the 1950s, due to rent increases.

Benjamin Bass died in 1978.

Bass's son Fred – who started working in the store on weekends when he was 13 years old – took over the business in 1956 and the next year moved the store to the present location at the corner of East 12th Street and Broadway. The store expanded to the entire first floor of the building, and then first three floors in the 1970s. In 1996 Bass bought the building at East 12th Street and Broadway for $8.2 million, by which time the Strand was the largest used bookstore in the world. The store now occupies three and a half floors, with another one and half floors for offices.

Strand also has two kiosks, one in Times Square and one in Central Park, and has a pop-up location in the Artists & Fleas market in Soho. They also participate in seasonal holiday markets in Union Square, Bryant Park, and Columbus Circle.

Bass's daughter Nancy Bass Wyden, the current owner of the Strand, began helping in the store at age 6, sharpening pencils for staff. At 16, she began taking phone requests, working the cash register, and managing the store's Central Park kiosks. After receiving her MBA from the University of Wisconsin and working briefly for Exxon, she returned to New York City to work for her father at The Strand. Wyden officially joined The Strand as a manager in 1986. She established the store's Books by the Foot department, curating custom book collections and private libraries. She spearheaded major renovations and expansions of the store in 2005, and supervised the rollout of The Strand's official bookish merchandise, including t-shirts and totes, which now account for over 15% of the business's revenue.

Wyden become the co-owner of the store on her father's retirement in November 2017. With her father's death in January 2018, she is now the sole owner.

Wyden is married to United States Senator for Oregon, Ron Wyden, whom she met while on a trip to Portland to see Powell's Books.

On December 22, 2021, Ben McFall, who had worked at the Strand since 1978, and was the longest-tenured bookseller there, died in his home as the result of a fall. McFall did not have an official position in the Strand's management, but was the only employee who had personal control over an entire section of the store, in his case the fiction section, and the only one with a desk designated for his own use. Wyden referred to McFall as "the heart of the Strand."

=== Landmarking ===
In December 2018, the New York City Landmarks Preservation Commission held a hearing on the topic of designating The Strand as a city landmark. Owner Nancy Bass Wyden objected and campaigned heavily against the designation, citing regulatory barriers to proposed renovations and increased costs of running the business as obstacles to running her independent business; she also contrasted the treatment of her store to the reception of Amazon HQ2 in New York, saying "I’m not asking for money or a tax rebate, just leave me alone." The commission voted to landmark the building on June 11, stating that it had "lost very few buildings" to mismanagement.

=== 2020 controversies ===
In March 2020, the Strand laid off most of its employees due to the COVID-19 pandemic, though in April it received a Paycheck Protection Program loan between $1 and $2 million intended to help maintain 212 jobs of which 188 had already been eliminated. Less than two dozen union jobs were restored. In July 2020, the Strand laid off 12 recently rehired employees.

On July 15, 2020, the Strand opened a new location on the Upper West Side, replacing Book Culture.

On October 23, 2020, Bass Wyden released a statement on Twitter saying the Strand was in danger of closing. This plea for help, issued on a Friday, drew enormous sales in the following days, with 25,000 online orders placed over the following weekend. Conversely, it also drew criticism from those who had followed the ongoing labor issues at the store.

Bass Wyden drew criticism as well for purchasing $115,000 in Amazon stock in April and May, and then $60,000 to $200,000 of the stock in June, after having previously characterized the company as a threat to the Strand's survival.

== In popular culture ==
- The Strand has been featured in films such as Six Degrees of Separation, Julie & Julia and Remember Me, starring Robert Pattinson, who played a Strand employee.
- The store and owner Nancy Bass Wyden were featured in the 2020 documentary The Booksellers, chronicling the antique book trade.

== See also ==
- Books in the United States
- Book Row
