= Meat Is Murder (book) =

1998 book by Mikita Brottman

Meat Is Murder: An Illustrated Guide to Cannibal Culture
- Author: Mikita Brottman
- Language: English
- Series: Creation Cinema series
- Subject: film history, pop culture, cannibalism
- Publisher: Creation Books
- Publication date: 1998
- Publication place: U.K.
- Pages: 247
- ISBN: 1-84068-040-7
- OCLC: 9781840680409
- Preceded by: Naked Lens: Beat Cinema (Creation Cinema #7)
- Followed by: Eros In Hell: Sex, Blood And Madness In Japanese Cinema (Creation Cinema #9)

Meat Is Murder: An Illustrated Guide to Cannibal Culture is a book originally published in 1998, which examines cannibalism in myth, true crime, and film.

== Description ==
The author of Meat Is Murder!, Mikita Brottman received her Ph.D. in English Language and Literature from Oxford University, taught Comparative Literature at Indiana University as a Visiting Assistant Professor, served as a professor at Shippensburg University of Pennsylvania, and is currently on the staff of the Pacifica Graduate Institute. Brottman's writings on film and film culture have appeared in Film Quarterly, Literature Film Quarterly and indieWire, where she regularly covers international film festivals. Meat is Murder! is the eighth volume in Creation Books' series on extreme cinema. The book deals not only with film portrayals of cannibalism, but also with societal and historical aspects of the phenomenon. One of Brottman's points in the study is that recounting stories of the horror of the cannibalism taboo—whether through myth, fairy tale, true crime or film—actually strengthens our communal ties.

Meat is Murder! is broken into three sections dealing with different aspects of cannibalism. The first part deals with cultural cannibalism. This aspect of the subject is further broken down into sections dealing with dietary, symbolic, and hunger. Criminal and psychotic cannibalism make up the second part of the book, featuring descriptions of notorious real-life cannibals. Cannibalism as it is portrayed in popular culture finishes this section of the book. The last third of the book discusses the portrayal of cannibalism in film. The first part of this section covers documentaries and art-house films such as Paul Bartel's Eating Raoul (1982) and Peter Greenaway's The Cook, the Thief, His Wife, and Her Lover (1989). The second chapter of this section of the book covers films on individuals who cannibalize, and the third chapter is on cannibal families or societies. Tobe Hooper's The Texas Chain Saw Massacre (1974) and Ruggero Deodato's Cannibal Holocaust (1980) are among the films given coverage in this chapter.

In the section on cannibal cinema, Mikita Brottman asserts that the subject is more widespread than is commonly assumed. She shows that cannibalism is a subject which has been portrayed in all time periods through film history, in films such as the 1908 silent comedy King of the Cannibal Islands, through David F. Friedman's exploitation "documentary" Cannibal Island (1956), through Soylent Green (1973), Alive (1993), and Ridley Scott's Hannibal (2001).

== Critical appraisal ==
Humanities and Social Sciences Online calls the Meat is Murder! a "gruesome but fascinating tour through the anthropological, criminological, literary, and cinematic history of cannibalism". Reviewer Philip Simpson judges that the book is "compelling" and takes a scholarly approach to its subject matter. The Headpress Guide to the Counter Culture (2004) points out that Brottman is not condescending to her subject matter, but criticizes the book for its lengthy film synopses. The review also deems the illustrations in the book to be of a poor quality. The Journal of Popular Culture writes that Brottman's theories as to the communal ties created through the horror of the subject of cannibalism are "argued persuasively".

Reviews reprinted at the book's publisher's site include Total Film, which calls Brottman's work, "worryingly exhaustive, [and] hungrily informed," and Terrorizer which writes that the book is "an informed study of both cultural and cinematic cannibalism... [which] combines meticulous research with a fascinating insight into the origins of cannibalism, infamous real-life perpetrators and the celluloid treatment of the subject." Film Review labeled the book, "An excellent study of cannibal culture."
