= David Sterritt =

American film critic (born 1944)

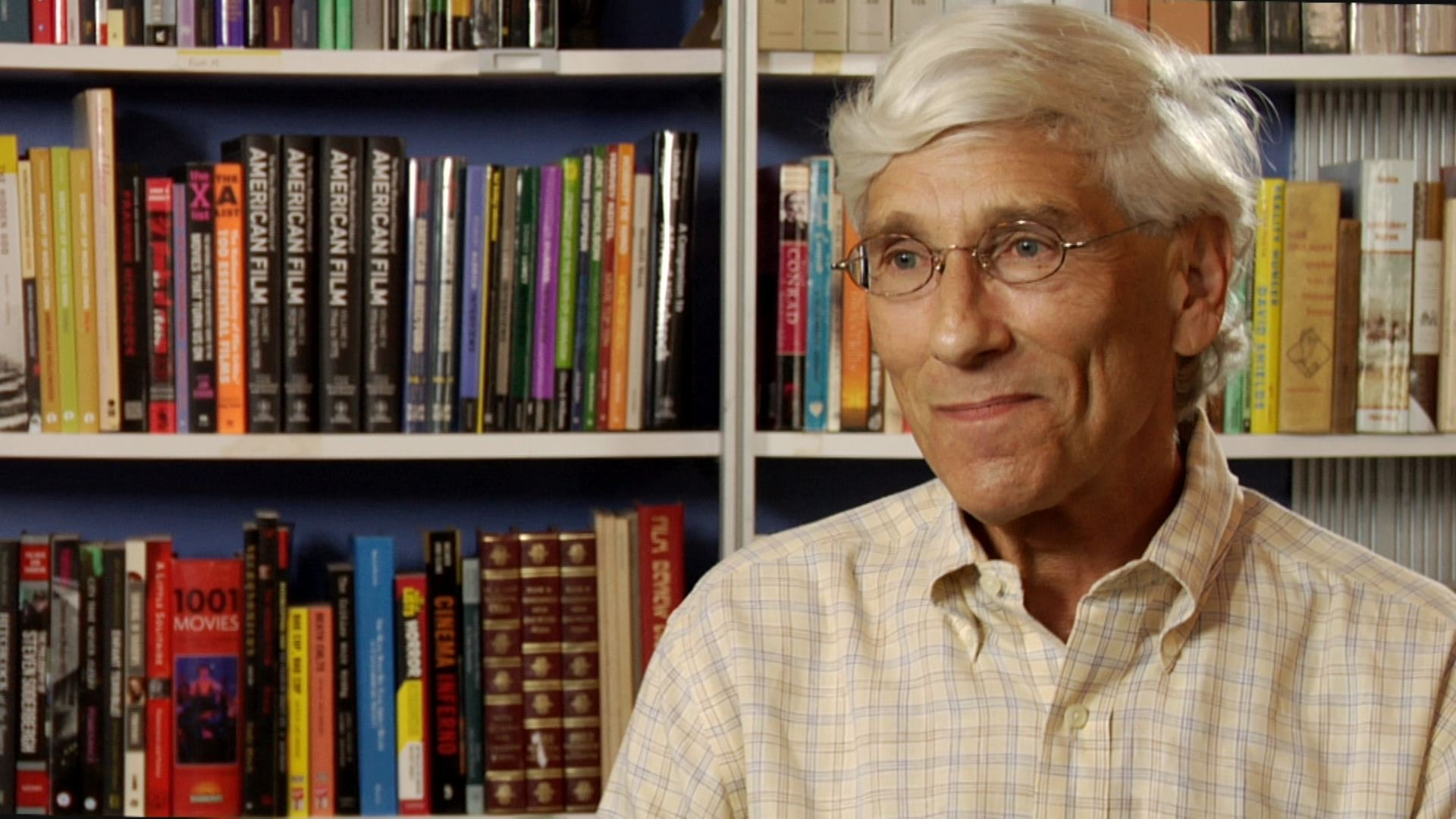
- David Sterritt
- Born: September 11, 1944 (age 82); United States
- Occupations: Film critic, author, scholar
- Partner: Mikita Brottman

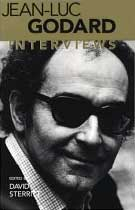
Jean-Luc Godard Interviews; one of Sterritt's most notable works

David Sterritt (born September 11, 1944) is a film critic, author and scholar. He is most notable for his work on Alfred Hitchcock and Jean-Luc Godard, and his many years as the Film Critic for The Christian Science Monitor, where, from 1968 until his retirement in 2005, he championed avant garde cinema, theater and music. He has a Ph.D. in Cinema Studies from New York University and for many years was the Chairman of the National Society of Film Critics.

His writings on film and film culture appear regularly in various publications, including The New York Times, MovieMaker, The Huffington Post, Senses of Cinema, Cineaste, Film Comment, Film Quarterly, Beliefnet, CounterPunch, and elsewhere. Sterritt has appeared as a guest on CBS Morning News, Nightline, Charlie Rose, Geraldo at Large, Catherine Crier Live, CNN Live Today, Countdown with Keith Olbermann, and The O'Reilly Factor, among many other television and radio shows.

Sterritt has also written influentially on the film and culture of the 1950s, the Beat Generation, French New Wave cinema, Robert Altman, Spike Lee and Terry Gilliam, and the TV series, The Honeymooners.

== Career ==
Sterritt began his career as a film critic at Boston After Dark (now the Boston Phoenix)where he was Chief Editor. He then moved to The Christian Science Monitor, where he worked as the newspaper's Film Critic and Special Correspondent. During his tenure at the Monitor, Sterritt held a number of additional appointments. From 1978-1980 he was the Film Critic for All Things Considered, on National Public Radio. From 1969 to 1973, he was the Boston Theater Critic for Variety, and he sat on the selection committee for the New York Film Festival from 1988 to 1992. Between 1994 and 2002 he was Senior Critic at the National Critics Institute of the Eugene O'Neill Theater Center, and he served as the video critic for Islands magazine from 2000-2003. From 2005-2007 he was Programming Associate at the Makor/Steinhardt Center of the 92nd Street Y. He writes regularly for Cineaste magazine.

Sterritt's writings on film and film culture have also appeared in MovieMaker in an article about independent film, Senses of Cinema in an article about Iranian filmmaker Abbas Kiarostami, Cinéaste in an article about French filmmaker Alain Renais, and Beliefnet in an article about Steven Spielberg's War of the Worlds.

In 1998 Sterritt edited a book of interviews and conversations with Godard by critics, scholars, and journalists, from the 1960s to the 1990s, illuminating the filmmaker's life, work, and ideas.

Sterritt is particularly well known for his careful considerations of films with a spiritual connection, such as Martin Scorsese's The Last Temptation of Christ (1988), and Mel Gibson's The Passion of the Christ (2004). According to Sterritt, "Scorsese has worshiped at two altars throughout his adult life: the altar of Christianity and the altar of cinema." In 2004 CNN quoted Sterritt about Gibson's controversial film, which some people protested due its troubling portrayal of Jews, as saying the film "certainly leaves the door open for anybody who comes in already contaminated with the germs of anti-Semitism. This will feed those germs."

From 1999-2015 Sterritt was the Co-Chair, with William Luhr, of the Columbia University Seminar on Cinema and Interdisciplinary Interpretation. He is currently on the Film Studies Faculty at Columbia University's Graduate Film Division, and Adjunct Faculty at the Maryland Institute College of Art in the Department of Language, Literature and Culture and the Department of Art History. He is also Distinguished Visiting Faculty in the Goldring Arts Journalism Program at the S.I. Newhouse School of Public Communications at Syracuse University, and Professor Emeritus of Theater and Film at Long Island University, where he taught from 1993 to 2005, obtaining tenure in 1998.

== Personal life ==
Sterritt is the partner of psychoanalyst, author and cultural critic Mikita Brottman.

== Books ==
- Guiltless Pleasures: A David Sterritt Film Reader
- Mad to Be Saved: The Beats, the 50s, and Film
- Screening the Beats: Media Culture and the Beat Sensibility
- The Honeymooners (TV Milestones)
- The Films of Alfred Hitchcock (Cambridge Film Classics)
- The Films of Jean-Luc Godard: Seeing the Invisible (Cambridge Film Classics)
- Jean-Luc Godard Interviews (University Press of Mississippi)
