= Thomas E. Weatherly Jr. =

American poet

Thomas Weatherly Jr. (November 3, 1942 – July 2014) was an American poet, associated with the Saint Mark's Church Poetry Project in New York City.

== Life ==
Born in Scottsboro, Alabama, on November 3, 1942, Thomas Weatherly Jr./eliyahu ben Avraham was an American poet connected with the Poetry Project at St. Mark’s Church in New York City. Weatherly’s parents, Thomas E. Weatherly Sr. and Lucy B. Golson Weatherly, were educators and civic leaders in the African-American community. His grandmother, Mary E. Hunter, was the first black school principal in the county.

Weatherly attended Morehouse College in Atlanta at the age of fifteen, and Alabama A & M University in Huntsville, Alabama, where he joined Omega Psi Phi. He later studied at Hofstra University, CUNY Manhattan, and Columbia University.

Weatherly served in the U.S. Marines before moving to New York in the winter of 1966–1967. Although sometimes classed among New York's Umbra poets, a circle of African-American poets and writers founded in the early 1960s, he did not include himself among them, having arrived late on the scene. He attended the inaugural poetry workshops at the Poetry Project, taught by poet Joel Oppenheimer, and soon began to teach there himself. Publishing in small journals such as Gandhabba, Minetta Review, Whetstone, The World, and Exquisite Corpse, Weatherly began describing himself as a poet; his first book, Maumau American Cantos, appeared in 1970.

He worked at the Strand Bookstore (rare and first edition bookstore) in New York City for decades, as well as at The Lion's Head, a local pub in Sheridan Square.

His work career also includes serving as a teacher of creative writing at St. Mark's Church in New York City, beginning in 1972. He served as poet-in-residence at Bishop College in Dallas, Texas, during 1970 and 1971. He was a writer-in-residence at State University of New York-Buffalo in the seventies. He taught Afro-Hispanic art at Rutgers University-Newark and conducted poetry workshops at grade schools, universities, prisons and poetry projects. He was an avid bicyclist, computer enthusiast and music lover. In later years, he split his time between New York City and Huntsville, Alabama. His blogs, Eclectic Git and saint satin stain, discuss topics ranging from prosody and politics; the last entry of saint satin stain is poem Weatherly wrote as a memorial for Walter Dean Myers, who had died just days before Weatherly himself. He also wrote for Left in Alabama, a political community blog.

In 1971, he published Thumbprint, and in 2006, Groundwater Press published his noted short history of the saxophone. Weatherly also edited and co-edited several anthologies, including Natural Process (1970), New Black Voices (1972), The Poetry of Black America (1973), Uplate (1989), Everybody Goodbye Ain't Gone (2006), and The Second Set (2008).

Weatherly was photographed by Andrei Kertesz on the streets of Greenwich Village, but according to his friend M. G. Stephens, "He preferred to stay out of the limelight." "I want my work famous, not my face," Weatherly quipped. He often called himself "the grandson of Wallace Stevens and H.D., Jimmy Rogers, Sippie Wallace, and first cousin to Paul Blackburn." His work "condenses the wisdom of a life and vast readings into brilliantly compact music," the writer Andrei Codrescu has said; Howard Kissel of the New York Daily News calls him "that rarest of birds, a mystic with a sense of humor . . . a red-blooded American Zen master." Among Weatherly's innovations was a counted-syllable, patterned-sonic form that he called the double glory, and which he explains in eclectic git, as follows:

a x x b  a x
x a x a x
x x a x c
x a x a c
a x b x a

tr lē ə lōn my lē

nōz trs děth my zĭk

něv ər my tĭd härt

nōz m dē brt hûrtz

hy mən blōz sound blz

The rhyme begins at both ends and moves toward the center and back out toward the beginning and end. The poem written in syllabic prosody, a pattern of the number of syllables, deploys lines of the same number of syllables, with one exception. That one exception does not break the rule. The rhymes in the main pattern identical rhyme, true rhyme and assonance plays against two consonant rhymes heart/hurts.

Weatherly was buried in a traditional Jewish ceremony in Huntsville, Alabama, upon his death in July 2014.

== Publications ==
- Maumau American Cantos, New York: Corinth Books, 1970 (facsimile at Eclipse Archive).
- Thumbprint. New York: Telegraph Books, 1971 (facsimile at Eclipse Archive).
- Climate/Stream (with Ken Bluford). Philadelphia: Middle Earth Books, 1972.
- Short history of the saxophone. New York: Groundwater Press, 2006.
