= Dauber & Pine =

American bookshop

Coordinates: 40.7352°N 73.9946°W

Dauber & Pine was a bookshop on Book Row in New York City, at 66 Fifth Avenue.

The shop opened in 1922, at 83 Fourth Avenue. Its founders were Samuel Dauber (1882–1965) and Nathan S. Pine (1892–1982). That year, Dauber left another shop called Stammer's Bookstore and briefly conducted business from 1351 Prospect Avenue in the Bronx. The shop moved to its longtime Fifth Avenue location in 1923. It became known as "Dauber & Pine" in 1925. At the shop, Pine was responsible for new books; Dauber was the antiquarian book dealer. Charles P. Everitt manned the Americana desk.

The shop issued many catalogs, 100 between 1923 and 1931 alone. Its 100th catalog included an early letter by Herman Melville to a Dr. William Sprague. In 1926, Dauber discovered an early edition of "The Murders in the Rue Morgue", the first printed outside Graham's Magazine, in a collection of pamphlets.

Murray, Samuel's son, took over on Murray's retirement. Pine retired in 1982. The shop closed in 1983, after The New School for Social Research delivered an eviction notice to further its expansion in the area. When it closed, the store's specialties were literature, history, and philosophy. It was a member of the Antiquarian Booksellers' Association of America.

== Works cited ==
- Wanders, Claire Myers (November 17, 1934). "Dauber & Pine Bookshops, Inc.: A Rendezvous of the Famous". Publishers Weekly. 126 (20): 1824–1827.
