= Gershon Legman =

American author, forklorist and cultural critic (1917–1999)

- Born: November 2, 1917; Scranton, Pennsylvania, U.S.
- Died: February 23, 1999 (aged 81); Opio, Bar-sur-Loup, Alpes-Maritimes, France
- Occupations: Writer, folklorist
- Writing career
- Pen name: Roger-Maxe de la Glannège

Gershon Legman (November 2, 1917 – February 23, 1999) was an American cultural critic, folklorist, and author of The Rationale of the Dirty Joke (1968) and The Horn Book: Studies in Erotic Folklore and Bibliography (1964).

== Early life and education ==
Legman was born in Scranton, Pennsylvania, to Emil and Julia Friedman Legman, both of Hungarian-Jewish descent; his father was a railroad clerk and butcher. After a failed stab at rabbinical school Legman attended and graduated from Scranton's Central High School, where Jane Jacobs and Cy Endfield were classmates. He enrolled in the University of Michigan for one semester in the fall of 1935, but left without sitting for his exams.

== Career ==
After departing the University of Michigan, Legman relocated to New York City, where he was a part-time freelance assistant to the physician and sexological researcher Robert Latou Dickinson at the New York Academy of Medicine while simultaneously working in the bookshop of Jacob Brussel, where a brisk business was done in publishing and selling contraband erotica; while spending long hours at the New York Public Library acquiring an autodidactic education. In the late 1940s, he became the editor of the little magazine Neurotica.

Throughout his career, Legman was an independent scholar without institutional affiliation, except for one year during 1964–1965 when he was a writer in residence at the University of California, San Diego, in the first year of the new campus' undergraduate programs. He pioneered the serious academic study of erotic and taboo materials in folklore. He also was a talented raconteur and could spin out tales non-stop for hours.

He acquired a number of interests including sexuality, erotic folklore, and origami, becoming a pivotal figure in founding the modern origami international movement. In 1940, at age 23, Legman wrote Oragenitalism, Part I: Cunnilinctus under the pen name Roger-Maxe de la Glannège. Nearly all copies were seized by the police and destroyed in a raid on Jacob Brussel's shop. For a period of time, Legman was a bibliographic researcher and book scout for the Kinsey Institute.

=== Author ===
In the late 1930s and early 1940s, Legman was involved with an informal, New York-based pornography writing group of authors. He was already intimately knowledgeable of the milieu of erotic literature, acquainted with a number of European and American publishers, booksellers, and collectors of erotica. Legman regularly wrote pornographic texts at $50 a page for "an oil millionaire from Oklahoma," which remained mostly unpublished. The customer soon terminated their arrangement, "alienated" by the excessive literary style. One of Legman's texts, titled "The Passionate Pedant" subsequently found its way into The Oxford Professor Returns, a collection published in 1971 by Grove Press. (Note: The novel contained some of its author's wit and humor. E.g. "'Well, gentlemen', said the professor, 'we are gathered once again to discuss cunt in its socio-psychological and psycho-physiological significance in modern civilization'.")

In 1949, Legman published Love and Death, an attack on sexual censorship, arguing that American culture was permissive of graphic violence in proportion to, and as a consequence of, its repression of the erotic. Legman published and shipped the treatise himself, although he ran afoul of the United States Post Office Department authorities, who stopped his deliveries due to the supposed "indecent, vulgar, and obscene" content. Legman's book included a chapter that attacked contemporary pre-Code comic books as harmful to children for their celebration of violence, foreshadowing the later crusade against the comic book industry dominated by Fredric Wertham.

Love and Death was an outgrowth of the little magazine Neurotica, edited by Jay Landesman and published in nine issues between 1948 and 1952. Legman was a regular contributor and eventually took over from Landesman as editor. Other contributors included John Clellon Holmes, Larry Rivers, Carl Solomon, Judith Malina, Allen Ginsberg, Marshall McLuhan, and Kenneth Patchen, which gave it influence disproportionate to its small circulation of a few thousand. The magazine had a few clashes with the authorities, and closed after the censors objected to an article on castration written by Legman.

The full set of Neurotica was reprinted in one volume by Hacker Art Books, New York, in 1963. The Horn Book : Studies in Erotic Folklore and Bibliography was a collection of assorted writings from the 1950s and 1960s. Legman was a prolific writer of essays, reviews, and scholarly introductions, including those for the anonymous Victorian erotic memoir My Secret Life (1966), Aleksandr Afanasyev's Russian Secret Tales (1966), and Mark Twain's The Mammoth Cod and Address to the Stomach Club (1976). He supplemented his income at times through the sale of rare erotica.

On account of his trial for violating United States Post Office regulations in his distributing his book Love and Death, Legman found it prudent to depart the United States. In 1953, Legman moved to La Clé des Champs, a farm in the South of France village of Valbonne, where he pursued his intellectual interests with greater freedom.

In 1955, he organized an exhibition of Akira Yoshizawa's origami at the Stedelijk Museum in Amsterdam.

Legman spent several decades compiling specimens of bawdy humor including limericks.

In 1970, his first volume of over 1,700 limericks (published in 1953 by Les Hautes Etudes, Paris) was released in the United States as The Limerick. In 1977, he followed with a second volume, The New Limerick, which was reprinted as More Limericks in 1980. His magnum opus is considered to be Rationale of the Dirty Joke: An Analysis of Sexual Humor, an overview of erotic folklore. It was followed by No Laughing Matter : Rationale of the Dirty Joke: An Analysis of Sexual Humor, 2nd Series, for which a subscription had to be paid to support publishing, as no publisher would touch it after Grove put out volume one in 1968. Near the end of his life, Legman edited Roll Me in Your Arms and Blow the Candle Out, two volumes of bawdy songs and lore collected by Vance Randolph (both 1992). Another of Legman's endeavors was his edition of Robert Burns' The Merry Muses of Caledonia (1965).

=== Autobiography ===
The title of Gershon Legman's autobiography, Peregrine Penis, was a sobriquet bestowed on him by his girlfriend Louise "Beka" Doherty, because he "used to travel to meet her in strange places." The writing of Peregrine Penis, over "six hundred pages" in length, was continually subsidized by Larry McMurtry.

On September 5, 2016, Book One of Gershon Legman's autobiography became available as a print-on-demand, two-volume set, carefully edited by Judith Evans Legman (G. Legman's widow), under the title I Love You, I Really Do. On March 8, 2017, Book Two appeared in a third volume, under the title Mooncalf, which continues the story of Legman's life up to the eve of World War II. Book Three, World I Never Made, was released in a fourth volume in August 2017. A fifth volume, Musick to My Sorrow, was published in March 2018, and a sixth volume, Windows of Winter & Flagrant Delectations, appeared in October 2018. The seventh and last volume, "The Book of Moones" was published on Amazon, as were the others, in 2022.

== Legacy ==
Legman was in many senses a radical, but never identified with the movements of his time, decrying the sexual revolution, for example, in The Fake Revolt (1967), and leaving countless irascible obiter dicta on such topics as women's liberation, rock and roll and the psychedelic movement's use of mind-altering substances. However, he said he was the inventor of the famous phrase "Make love, not war", in a lecture given at the Ohio University in 1963. He remained essentially an individualist and an idealist: "I consider sexual love the central mystery and central reality of life", he wrote. And "I believe in a personal and intense style, and in making value judgements. This is unfashionable now, but is the only responsible position". Mikita Brottman offers the consensus view of Legman as, in many ways, his own worst enemy, exacerbating his rejection by the academic community with vitriolic attacks upon it.

In Bruce Jackson's view "Legman is the person, more than any other, who made research into erotic folklore and erotic verbal behavior academically respectable" and who made accessible to other scholars material that scholarly journals had long been afraid to publish.

== Personal life ==
According to historian George Chauncey's book Gay New York: Gender, Urban Culture, and the Making of the Gay Male World, 1890–1940, Legman was gay and is credited with having invented the vibrating dildo when he was only twenty. However, Mikita Brottman holds that he was exclusively heterosexual, accounting for both the abandonment of his proposed volume on fellatio as well as, possibly and in some measure, for his contempt for Alfred Kinsey. He was married for many years to Beverley Keith (died of lung cancer, 1966), married briefly to Christine Conrad, ended by annulment, then to Judith Evans.

== Death ==
Legman died February 23, 1999, in Bar-sur-Loup, France, where he had been residing, a week after suffering a stroke.

== Books ==
- 1940. 'Roger-Maxe de la Glannège' (pseud.). Oragenitalism. An encyclopedic outline of oral excitation. Part I. Cunnilinctus. N.p., N.e., (New York, Jacob Brussel), 1940. 63pp. New revised and augmented edition : Oragenitalism. Oral techniques in genital excitation. New York, Julian Press, 1969. 319pp. Contains five sections. I – Cunnilinctus. II – Fellation. IIa – A practical treatise. III – Irrumation. IV – The Sixty-Nine.
- 1949. (With Burt Franklin). David Ricardo and Ricardian Theory. A bibliographical checklist. New York, Burt Franklin,1949. vi, 88pp.
- 1949. Love and Death. A study in censorship. New York, Breaking Point, 1949. 95pp. New Edition: New York, Hacker Art Books, 1963.
- 1950. (With G. V. Hamilton). On the Cause of Homosexuality. Two essays the second in reply to the first. New York, Breaking Point, 1950. 31pp.
- 1952. Bibliography of Paper-Folding. N.p., Journal of Occasional Bibliography, 1952. 8pp.
- 1953. (Jarry) Alfred Jarry. King Turd. Trans. G. Legman & Beverley Keith. Translator's Note by G. Legman. New York, Boar's Head Books, 1953. 189pp.
- 1953. The Limerick. 1700 examples with notes variants and index. Paris: Les Hautes Etudes, 1953. 517pp.
- 1964. The Horn Book. Studies in erotic folklore and bibliography. New York, University Books, 1964. 565pp. (U.K. edition : Jonathan Cape. 1970). Spanish translation: Mexico City, Ediciones Roca, 1974.
- 1965. (Burns) The Merry Muses of Caledonia. Collected and in part written by Robert Burns. Edited by G. Legman. New York: University Books, 1965. lxv, 326pp.
- 1966. (Farmer & Henley) John S. Farmer & W. E. Henley. Dictionary of Slang & Its Analogues. Volume I. Revised Edition. Introductions by Lee Revens & G. Legman. New York, University Books, 1966. xcvii, 461pp.
- 1966. (Afanasyev) Aleksander N. Afanasyev. Russian Secret Tales. Folklore annotations by Giuseppe Pitré. Illus. Leon Kotkofsky. Introduction by G. Legman. New York, Brussel & Brussel, 1966. xxix, xix, 306pp. New Edition: Baltimore, Clearfield, 1988. Contains new foreword by Alan Dundes.
- 1966. (With others). The Guilt of the Templars. By G. Legman, Henry Charles Lea, Thomas Wright, George Witt, Sir James Tennent, Sir William Dugdale. Prefatory note by Jacques Barzun. New York: Basic Books, 1966. xi, 308pp., illus.
- 1967. The Fake Revolt. The naked truth about the hippy revolt. New York: Breaking Point, 1967. New Edition. New York: Breaking Point, 1969.
- 1968. Rationale of the Dirty Joke. An analysis of sexual humor. First series. New York: Grove Press, 1968. 811pp.
- 1975. No Laughing Matter. Rationale of the Dirty Joke. Second Series. New York: Breaking Point, 1975. 992pp.
- 1976. (Twain). The Mammoth Cod and Address to The Stomach Club with an introduction by G. Legman. Milwaukee, Wisconsin: Maledicta, Inc., 1976. 25pp.
- The New Limerick: 2750 Unpublished Examples, American and British. New York, 1977, ISBN 0-517-53091-0)
- 1979. (McCosh) Sandra McCosh. Children's Humour. Introduction G. Legman. London: Panther, 1979. 335pp.
- 1982. The Art of Mahlon Blaine. A Reminiscence by G. Legman. With a Mahlon Blaine bibliography compiled by Roland Trenary. East Lansing, Peregrine Books, 1982. 26, 82pp. illus.
- 2009. A Word on Caxton's 'Dictes'. Introduction Karl Orend. Paris, Alyscamps Press (St.Yon Pamphleteers Series: Volume 1), 2009. xi, 31pp. New Edition: St.Yon & Paris, Alyscamps Press & Michael Neal, 2011.
- 2016. I Love You, I Really Do (Part I). CreateSpace Independent Publishing Platform. First volume of Legman's autobiography. 498pp. ISBN 978-1530187720
- 2016. I Love You, I Really Do (Part II). CreateSpace Independent Publishing Platform. Second volume of Legman's autobiography. 528pp. ISBN 978-1535486743
- 2017. Mooncalf. CreateSpace Independent Publishing Platform. Third volume of Legman's autobiography. 562pp. ISBN 978-1540457929
- 2017. World I Never Made. CreateSpace Independent Publishing Platform. Fourth volume of Legman's autobiography. 668pp. ISBN 978-1548442439
- 2018. Musick to My Sorrow. CreateSpace. Fifth volume of Legman's autobiography. 598pp. ISBN 978-1984077745
- 2018. Windows of Winter & Flagrant Delectations. CreateSpace. Sixth volume of Legman's autobiography. 747pp. ISBN 978-1724895424

== See also ==
- Lavender linguistics

== Additional reading ==
- 1977. Reinhold Aman (Ed.& Intro.). Maledicta, The International Journal of Verbal Aggression. Waukesha, Winter 1977. Vol.1 N°2 Special issue 'In Honorem G. Legman. Festschrift'.
- 2004. Mikita Brottman. Funny Peculiar. Gershon Legman and the Psychopathology of Humor. New Jersey: Analytic Press, 2004.
- Susan G. Davis, "Eros Meets Civilization: Gershon Legman Confronts the Post Office", in Alexander Cockburn & Jeffrey St. Clair: Serpents in the Garden: Liaisons with Culture and Sex. Counterpunch & AK Press, Edinburgh, 2004.
- 2019. Susan G Davis. Dirty jokes and bawdy songs: the uncensored life of Gershon Legman. Champaign, IL: University of Illinois Press, 2019 (Cloth, Paper, PDF, ePub). 332 pages.
- Larry McMurtry: Books: a Memoir. Simon & Schuster, New York, 2008.
