= Oragenitalism =

1969 book by Gershon Legman about oral sexual activity

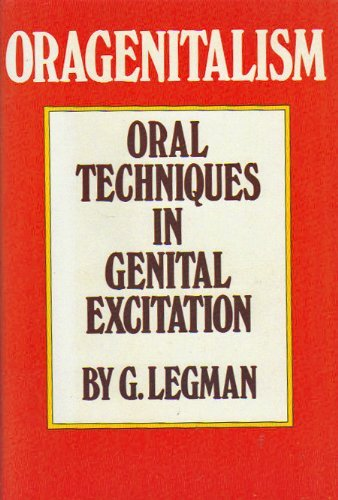
- Author: Gershon Legman
- Language: English
- Subject: Oral sex
- Publication date: 1969
- Publication place: United States
- Media type: Print

Oragenitalism is a book by the American folklorist Gershon Legman, published by the Julian Press in 1969. The book describes various types of oral sex. The book is intended as "instruction manual, conduct guide, and household advice book". The author claimed that it was the earliest book of its kind on the subject, and for a long time the only one. Its contents are divided into four sections: "Cunnilinctus" written under the pen-name Roger-Maxe de la Glannege (an anagram of his real name) and published by Jacob Brussel of New York in 1940; the three remaining sections "Fellatio", "Irrumation", and "Sixty-Nine" were not published until 1969.
