= Mikita Brottman =

British-American non-fiction author, scholar, and psychologist

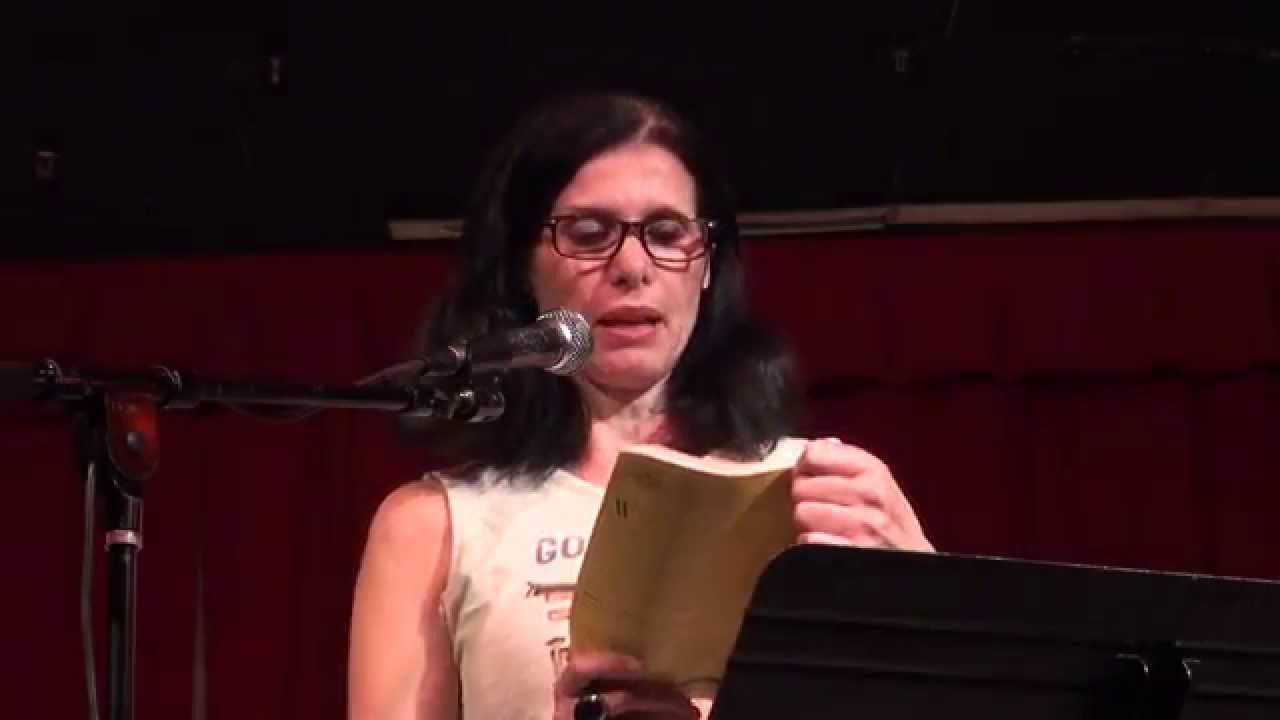
- Mikita Brottman, New Mercury Readings, Baltimore 2016
- Born: 1966 (age 59–60); Sheffield, England, United Kingdom
- Occupations: Author, scholar, psychoanalyst

Mikita Brottman (born 1966) is a British-American non-fiction author, scholar, and psychoanalyst known for her interest in true crime. Her writing blends a number of genres, often incorporating elements of autobiography, psychoanalysis, forensic psychology, and literary history.

== Life and career ==
Brottman was born in Sheffield, England, and educated at St. Hilda's College and St. Hugh's College, University of Oxford, from which she received a D.Phil in English Language and Literature (1994).

She was Visiting Professor of Comparative literature at Indiana University and was Chair of the Program in Humanities with an emphasis in Depth Psychology at the Pacifica Graduate Institute from 2008 to 2010. She is a certified psychoanalyst and a full faculty Professor in the Department of Humanistic Studies at the Maryland Institute College of Art, in Baltimore.

Brottman has also worked in the Maryland prison system and in forensic psychiatric facilities.

== Themes ==
Brottman's work has included writing on horror films, critical theory, reading, psychoanalysis, animals, and the work of the American folklorist, Gershon Legman. Her articles and case studies have appeared in The American Journal of Psychoanalysis, New Literary History, American Imago, and other journals. Her essays have also appeared in a number of books and anthologies. Her book The Solitary Vice: Against Reading (2009) was selected as one of the Best Books of 2009 by Publishers Weekly, who said: "Sharp, whimsical and impassioned, Brottman's look at the pleasures and perils of compulsive reading is itself compulsively readable and will connect with any book lover." In 2018, a Spanish edition was published by Blackie Books, under the title Contra La Lectura.

The most consistent focus of Brottman's work, however, is her reconsideration and transformation of the true crime genre. Thirteen Girls (Nine-Banded Books, 2012) is a story cycle of fictionalized narratives, each based on a real victim of a serial killer, each told from a different perspective. According to a review of the book in Rain Taxi, "Brottman’s grimly pragmatic literary stance recalls such earlier artists of the quotidian macabre as Shirley Jackson and Flannery O’Connor: Thirteen Girls is an impressive successor to their stories of American dread." The Maximum Security Book Club: Reading Literature in a Men's Prison (2016) describes Brottman's relationship with nine inmates in a reading group she started at Jessup Correctional Institution, a men's maximum security prison, and their reactions to the works of classic literature they read together.

An Unexplained Death - The True Story of a Body at the Belvedere (2018), is a discursive and philosophical meditation on suicide, voyeurism, missing people, deaths in hotels, and the author's obsessive investigation into the mysterious death of Rey Rivera in Baltimore's Belvedere Hotel in 2006. Described by James Ellroy as "a learned, lucid, and finally heartbreaking account of urban obsession," the book was short-listed for the 2019 Gold Dagger for nonfiction by the Crime Writers' Association of the United Kingdom.

Couple Found Slain: After a Family Murder (Henry Holt, 2021) is a biography of Brian Bechtold, who was found not guilty by reason of insanity for the 1992 murder of his parents. According to The New York Times, "Brottman offers a precise and rarely seen accounting of American hospitals for the criminally insane. She argues, via her subject Brian Bechtold, that the system we have to shelter and heal people like him not only does not work, but is in fact far more damaging than incarceration."

Guilty Creatures: Sex, God and Murder in Tallahassee, Florida (One Signal/Atria, 2024) examines and analyzes the 2000 murder of Mike Williams. The New York Times described it as "an unputdownable read."

== Personal life ==
Brottman is the partner of the American film critic David Sterritt.

== Books ==
- Meat Is Murder, Creation Books, 1998
- Hollywood Hex, Creation Books, 1999
- Car Crash Culture (ed.), New York: Palgrave, 2002.
- Funny Peculiar: Gershon Legman and the Psychopathology of Humor, Hillsdale, NJ: Analytic Press, Inc., 2004.
- Offensive Films, Nashville: Vanderbilt University Press, 2005.
- High Theory, Low Culture, New York: Palgrave, 2005.
- The Solitary Vice: Against Reading, Los Angeles: Counterpoint, 2009.
- Phantoms of the Clinic: From Thought-Transference to Projective Identification, Karnac Books, 2011.
- Hyena, Reaktion Books - Animal, 2012.
- Thirteen Girls, Nine Banded Books, 2012.
- House of Quiet Madness, Ravenous Shadows, 2012.
- The Great Grisby: Two Thousand Years of Literary, Royal, Philosophical, and Artistic Dog Lovers and Their Exceptional Animals, HarperCollins, 2014.
- The Maximum Security Book Club: Reading Literature in a Men's Prison, HarperCollins, 2016.
- An Unexplained Death: A True Story of a Body at the Belvedere, Henry Holt, 2018.
- Couple Found Slain: After a Family Murder. Henry Holt, 2021.
- Guilty Creatures: Sex, God, and Murder in Tallahassee, Florida. Atria/One Signal Publishers, 2024.
